= Haruki Murakami bibliography =

Works of the Japanese author

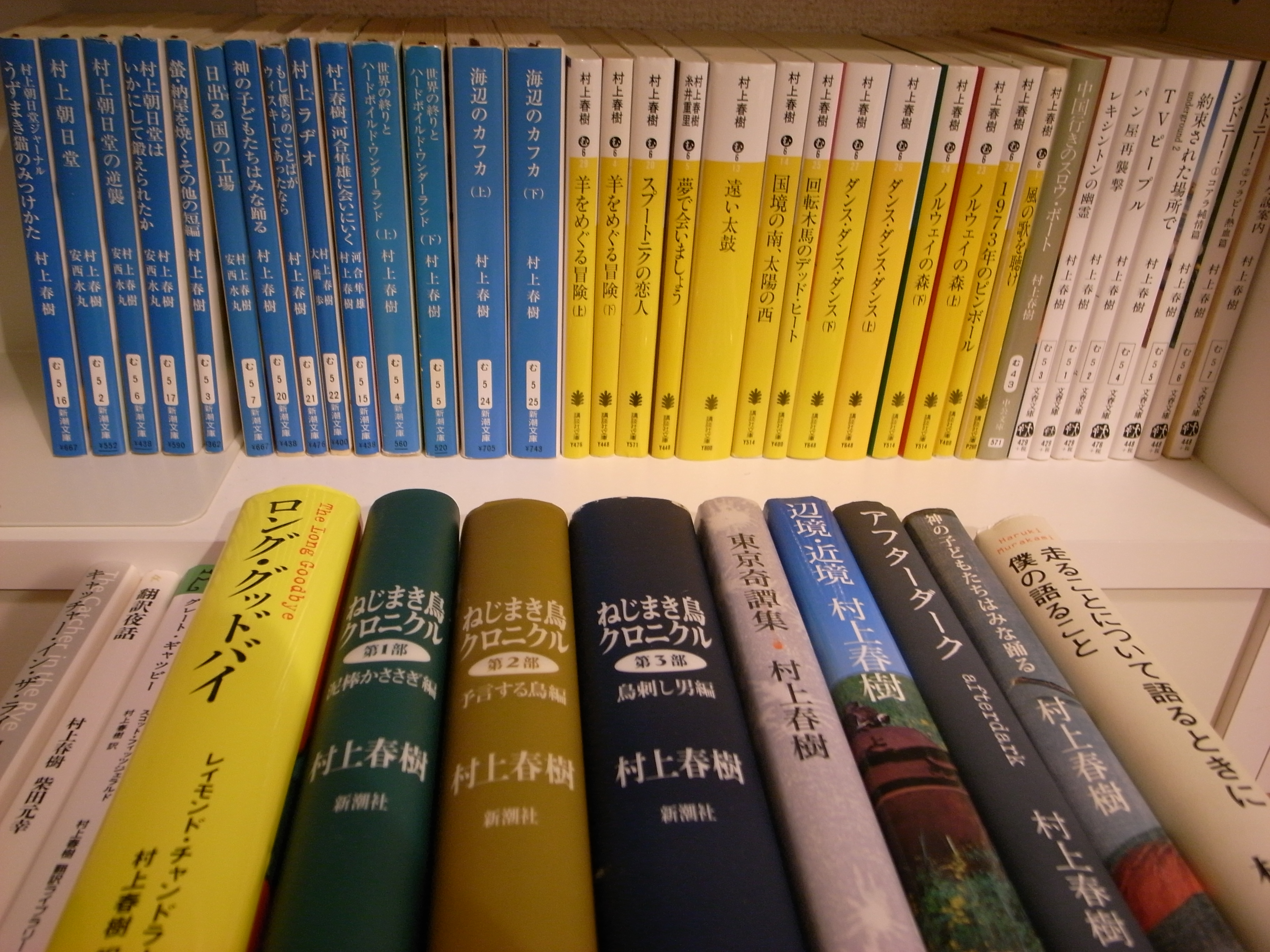
- Books by Haruki Murakami
- Novels↙: 16
- Collections↙: 6

This is an incomplete bibliography of Japanese author Haruki Murakami, as not all his works have been translated into English.

Kanji titles are given with Hepburn romanization. (Original titles entirely in transcribed English are given as "katakana / romaji = English".)

== Novels ==
Original publication		English publication		
Title	Year	Title	Year	Pages
風の歌を聴け; Kaze no uta o kike	1979	Hear the Wind Sing	1987/2015	130
1973年のピンボール; 1973-nen no pinbōru	1980	Pinball, 1973	1985/2015	215
羊をめぐる冒険; Hitsuji o meguru bōken	1982	A Wild Sheep Chase	1989	353
世界の終りとハードボイルド・ワンダーランド; Sekai no owari to Hādo-boirudo Wandārando	1985	Hard-Boiled Wonderland and the End of the World	1991	400
ノルウェイの森; Noruwei no mori	1987	Norwegian Wood	1989 (Birnbaum's translation); 2000 (Rubin's translation)	296 (1989) 400 (2000)
ダンス・ダンス・ダンス; Dansu dansu dansu	1988	Dance Dance Dance	1994	393
国境の南、太陽の西; Kokkyō no minami, taiyō no nishi	1992	South of the Border, West of the Sun	2000	190
ねじまき鳥クロニクル; Nejimaki-dori kuronikuru	1994–1995	The Wind-Up Bird Chronicle	1997	607
スプートニクの恋人; Supūtoniku no koibito	1999	Sputnik Sweetheart	2001	229
海辺のカフカ; Umibe no Kafuka	2002	Kafka on the Shore	2005	467
アフターダーク; Afutā dāku	2004	After Dark	2007	191
1Q84; Ichi-kyū-hachi-yon	2009–2010	1Q84	2011	925
色彩を持たない多崎つくると、彼の巡礼の年; Shikisai o motanai Tazaki Tsukuru to, kare no junrei no toshi	2013	Colorless Tsukuru Tazaki and His Years of Pilgrimage	2014	308
騎士団長殺し; Kishidanchō-goroshi	2017	Killing Commendatore	2018	704
街とその不確かな壁; Machi to sono futashika na kabe	2023	The City and Its Uncertain Walls	2024	464
夏帆; Kaho	2026	The Tale of Kaho	tba	352

== Short stories ==
=== Collections ===
Original publication		English publication		Notes
Title	Year	Title	Year	Notes
夢で逢いましょう Yume de Aimashou	1981	Let's Meet in a Dream (a collection of short-short stories, 1981) Co-authored with Shigesato Itoi	1981	
象の消滅; Zō no shōmetsu	(2005) (Note: The Elephant Vanishes was first a 1993 English-language compilation, whose Japanese counterpart was released in 2005. (See also the collection's article ja:象の消滅 短篇選集 1980–1991 in Japanese.))	The Elephant Vanishes (17 stories, 1980–1991)	1993	
神の子どもたちはみな踊る; Kami no kodomo-tachi wa mina odoru	2000	After the Quake (6 stories, 1999–2000)	2002	
めくらやなぎと眠る女; Mekurayanagi to nemuru onna	(2009) (Note: Blind Willow, Sleeping Woman was first a 2006 English-language compilation, whose Japanese counterpart was released in 2009. (See also the collection's article ja:めくらやなぎと眠る女 (短編小説集) in Japanese.))	Blind Willow, Sleeping Woman (24 stories, 1980–2005)	2006	
女のいない男たち; Onna no inai otokotachi (Note: "Murakami's new book hits shelves amid fan frenzy; more ordered", The Japan Times, April 18, 2014.)	2014	Men Without Women (7 stories, 2013–2014)	2017	
一人称単数; Ichininshō Tansū	2020	First Person Singular (8 stories, 2018–2020)	2021	

=== List of stories ===
Original publication		English publication	
Year	Title	Title	Collected/reprinted in
1980	中国行きのスロウ・ボート; Chūgoku-yuki no surō bōto	"A Slow Boat to China"	The Elephant Vanishes
1980	貧乏な叔母さんの話; Binbō na obasan no hanashi	"A 'Poor Aunt' Story" (The New Yorker, December 3, 2001)	Blind Willow, Sleeping Woman
1981	ニューヨーク炭鉱の悲劇; Nyū Yōku tankō no higeki	"New York Mining Disaster" [1990] (Note: A longer version of "New York Mining Disaster" (ニューヨーク炭鉱の悲劇, Nyū Yōku tankō no higeki) was first published in magazine in 1981, then a shorter revised version collected in 1990. (See also ja:ニューヨーク炭鉱の悲劇 (村上春樹) in Japanese.)) (The New Yorker, January 11, 1999)	Blind Willow, Sleeping Woman
1981	スパゲティーの年に; Supagetī no toshi ni	"The Year of Spaghetti" (The New Yorker, November 21, 2005)	Blind Willow, Sleeping Woman "The Year of Spaghetti". The New Yorker. 97 (27): 26–27. September 6, 2021.
1981	四月のある晴れた朝に100パーセントの女の子に出会うことについて; Shigatsu no aru hareta asa ni 100-paasento no onna no ko ni deau koto ni tsuite	"On Seeing the 100% Perfect Girl One Beautiful April Morning"	The Elephant Vanishes
1981	かいつぶり; Kaitsuburi	"Dabchick"	Blind Willow, Sleeping Woman
1981	カンガルー日和; Kangarū biyori	"A Perfect Day for Kangaroos"	Blind Willow, Sleeping Woman
1981	カンガルー通信; Kangarū tsūshin	"The Kangaroo Communiqué"	The Elephant Vanishes
1982	午後の最後の芝生; Gogo no saigo no shibafu	"The Last Lawn of the Afternoon"	The Elephant Vanishes
1983	鏡 Kagami	"The Mirror"	Blind Willow, Sleeping Woman
1983	とんがり焼の盛衰; Tongari-yaki no seisui	"The Rise and Fall of Sharpie Cakes"	Blind Willow, Sleeping Woman
1983	螢 Hotaru	"Firefly"	Blind Willow, Sleeping Woman
1983	納屋を焼く; Naya o yaku	"Barn Burning" (The New Yorker, November 2, 1992)	The Elephant Vanishes
1983	1963/1982年のイパネマ娘; 1963/1982-nen no Ipanema-musume	"The 1963/1982 Girl from Ipanema"	The Penguin Book of Japanese Short Stories (2018)
1984	蟹 (within 野球場); Kani (within Yakyūjō)	"Crabs" [2003] (Note: The short story "Crabs" (蟹, Kani) was first published nested within the untranslated story "Baseball Field" (野球場, Yakyūjō) in 1984, then cut out and revised for separate publication in 2003. See also: Daniel Morales (2008), "Murakami Haruki B-Sides", Néojaponisme, May 12, 2008: "Thus begins "Baseball Field" [1984], one of Haruki Murakami's lesser-known short stories. Part of the story was extracted, edited and expanded into "Crabs", published in Blind Willow, Sleeping Woman, but the entirety has never been published in English. The young man in the story is at a café with Murakami himself. He mailed Murakami one of his short stories (the content of which the real-life Murakami later turned into "Crabs"), and Murakami, charmed by the young man's interesting handwriting and somewhat impressed with the story itself, read all 70 pages and sent him a letter of suggestions. "Baseball Field" tells the story of their subsequent meeting over coffee.")	Blind Willow, Sleeping Woman
1984	嘔吐1979; Ōto 1979	"Nausea 1979"	Blind Willow, Sleeping Woman
1984	ハンティング・ナイフ; Hantingu naifu = Hunting knife	"Hunting Knife" (The New Yorker, November 17, 2003)	Blind Willow, Sleeping Woman
1984	踊る小人; Odoru kobito	"The Dancing Dwarf"	The Elephant Vanishes
1985	レーダーホーゼン; Rēdāhōzen = Lederhosen	"Lederhosen"	The Elephant Vanishes
1985	パン屋再襲撃; Pan'ya saishūgeki	"The Second Bakery Attack"	The Elephant Vanishes
1985	象の消滅; Zō no shōmetsu	"The Elephant Vanishes" (The New Yorker, November 18, 1991)	The Elephant Vanishes
1985	ファミリー・アフェア; Famirī afea = Family affair	"Family Affair"	The Elephant Vanishes
1986	ローマ帝国の崩壊・一八八一年のインディアン蜂起・ヒットラーのポーランド侵入・そして強風世界; Rōma-teikoku no hōkai・1881-nen no Indian hōki・Hittorā no Pōrando shinnyū・soshite kyōfū sekai	"The Fall of the Roman Empire, the 1881 Indian Uprising, Hitler's Invasion of Poland, and the Realm of Raging Winds"	The Elephant Vanishes
1986	ねじまき鳥と火曜日の女たち; Nejimaki-dori to kayōbi no onnatachi	"The Wind-up Bird And Tuesday's Women" (The New Yorker, November 26, 1990)	The Elephant Vanishes
1989	眠り; Nemuri	"Sleep" (The New Yorker, March 30, 1992)	The Elephant Vanishes
1989	TVピープル; TV pīpuru = TV people (Note: This story originally appeared in a magazine under the longer title TVピープルの逆襲 (TV pīpuru no gyakushū, literally "The TV People Strike Back") but received this shorter final title for all further appearances. (See also ja:TVピープル in Japanese.))	"TV People" (The New Yorker, September 10, 1990)	The Elephant Vanishes
1989	飛行機―あるいは彼はいかにして詩を読むようにひとりごとを言ったか; Hikōki: arui wa kare wa ika ni shite shi o yomu yō ni hitorigoto o itta ka	"Aeroplane: Or, How He Talked to Himself as if Reciting Poetry" [1987] (Note: An earlier version of "Aeroplane" was published in 1987, then this rewritten version published in 1989. (See also ja:飛行機―あるいは彼はいかにして詩を読むようにひとりごとを言ったか in Japanese.)) (The New Yorker, July 1, 2002)	Blind Willow, Sleeping Woman
1989	我らの時代のフォークロア―高度資本主義前史; Warera no jidai no fōkuroa: kōdo shihonshugi zenshi	"A Folklore for My Generation: A Prehistory of Late-Stage Capitalism"	Blind Willow, Sleeping Woman
1990	トニー滝谷; Tonii Takitani	"Tony Takitani" (The New Yorker, April 15, 2002)	Blind Willow, Sleeping Woman
1991	沈黙; Chinmoku	"The Silence"	The Elephant Vanishes
1991	窓 Mado	"A Window" [1982] (Note: An earlier version of "A Window" (窓, Mado) was first published in a magazine in 1982 under the title "Do You Like Burt Bacharach?" (バート・バカラックはお好き？, Bāto Bakarakku wa o suki?), then this rewritten version was published in 1991.)	The Elephant Vanishes
1991	緑色の獣; Midori-iro no kemono	"The Little Green Monster"	The Elephant Vanishes
1991	氷男; Kōri otoko	"The Ice Man"	Blind Willow, Sleeping Woman
1991	人喰い猫; Hito-kui neko	"Man-Eating Cats" (The New Yorker, December 4, 2000)	Blind Willow, Sleeping Woman
1995	めくらやなぎと、眠る女; Mekurayanagi to, nemuru onna	"Blind Willow, Sleeping Woman" [1983] (Note: "Blind Willow, Sleeping Woman" was first published in 1983 as a different version (whose title didn't bear a comma), then rewritten in 1995 (taking its final title). (See also the story's article ja:めくらやなぎと眠る女 in Japanese.))	Blind Willow, Sleeping Woman
1996	七番目の男; Nanabanme no otoko	"The Seventh Man"	Blind Willow, Sleeping Woman
1997	?	“Another Way To Die”	New Yorker, January 12, 1997. Translated by Jay Rubin
1999	UFOが釧路に降りる; UFO ga Kushiro ni oriru	"UFO in Kushiro" (The New Yorker, March 19, 2001)	after the quake
1999	アイロンのある風景; Airon no aru fūkei	"Landscape with Flatiron"	after the quake
1999	神の子どもたちはみな踊る; Kami no kodomotachi wa mina odoru	"All God's Children Can Dance"	after the quake
1999	タイランド; Tairando = Thailand	"Thailand"	after the quake
1999	かえるくん、東京を救う; Kaeru-kun, Tōkyō o sukuu	"Super-Frog Saves Tokyo"	after the quake
2000	蜂蜜パイ; Hachimitsu pai	"Honey Pie" (The New Yorker, August 20, 2001)	after the quake
2002	バースデイ・ガール; Bāsudei gāru = Birthday girl	"Birthday Girl"	Blind Willow, Sleeping Woman
2005	偶然の旅人; Gūzen no tabibito	"Chance Traveller"	Blind Willow, Sleeping Woman
2005	ハナレイ・ベイ; Hanarei Bei = Hanalei Bay	"Hanalei Bay"	Blind Willow, Sleeping Woman
2005	どこであれそれが見つかりそうな場所で; Doko de are sore ga mitsukarisō na basho de	"Where I'm Likely to Find It" (The New Yorker, May 2, 2005)	Blind Willow, Sleeping Woman
2005	日々移動する腎臓のかたちをした石; Hibi idō suru jinzō no katachi o shita ishi	"The Kidney-Shaped Stone That Moves Every Day"	Blind Willow, Sleeping Woman
2005	品川猿; Shinagawa saru	"A Shinagawa Monkey" (The New Yorker, February 13, 2006)	Blind Willow, Sleeping Woman
2011	—	"Town of Cats" (Excerpt from 1Q84) (The New Yorker, September 5, 2011) (Note: Murakami, Haruki, "Town of Cats", The New Yorker, September 5, 2011.)	—
2013	—	"A Walk to Kobe" (Granta, issue 124, Summer 2013) (Note: Murakami, Haruki, "A Walk to Kobe", Granta, issue 123, Summer 2013.)	—
2013	恋するザムザ; Koisuru zamuza	Murakami, Haruki (October 28, 2013). "Samsa in Love". The New Yorker. 89 (34). Translated by Ted Goossen: 60–69.	Men Without Women
2013	ドライブ・マイ・カー; Doraibu mai kā	"Drive My Car"	Men Without Women
2014	イエスタデイ; Iesutadei	"Yesterday" (The New Yorker, June 9, 2014) (Note: Murakami, Haruki, "Yesterday", The New Yorker, June 9, 2014.)	Men Without Women
2014	シェエラザード; Sheerazādo	"Scheherazade" (The New Yorker, October 13, 2014) (Note: Murakami, Haruki, "Scheherazade", The New Yorker, October 13, 2014.)	Men Without Women
2015	木野; Kino	"Kino" (The New Yorker, February 23, 2015) (Note: Murakami, Haruki, "Kino", The New Yorker, February 23, 2015.)	Men Without Women
2018	—	"Wind Cave" (The New Yorker, September 3, 2018) (Note: Murakami, Haruki,, The New Yorker, September 3, 2018.)	—
2018	クリーム; Kurīmu (Bungakukai. July 2018.)	"Cream" (The New Yorker, January 28, 2019) (Note: Murakami, Haruki,, The New Yorker, January 28, 2019.)	First Person Singular
2018	チャーリー・パーカー・プレイズ・ボサノヴァ; Chārī Pākā Pureizu Bosanova (Bungakukai. July 2018.)	"Charlie Parker Plays Bossa Nova" (Granta 148, Summer 2019)	First Person Singular
2018	石のまくらに; Ishi no Makura ni (Bungakukai. July 2018.)	"On a Stone Pillow"	First Person Singular
2019	ウィズ・ザ・ビートルズ; Wizu za Bītoruzu (Bungakukai. August 2019.)	"With the Beatles" (The New Yorker, February 17 and 24, 2020) (Note: Murakami, Haruki, "With the Beatles"., The New Yorker, February 17 & 24, 2020.)	First Person Singular
2019	ヤクルト・スワローズ詩集; Yakuruto Suwarōzu Shishū (Bungakukai. August 2019.)	The Yakult Swallows Poetry Collection	First Person Singular
2019	謝肉祭; Shanikusai (Bungakukai. December 2019.)	"Carnaval"	First Person Singular
2020	品川猿の告白; Shinagawa Saru no Kokuhaku (Bungakukai. February 2020.)	"Confessions of a Shinagawa Monkey" (The New Yorker, June 8 and 15, 2020) (Note: Murakami, Haruki, . "Confessions of a Shinagawa Monkey". The New Yorker. June 2, 2020. Archived from the original on June 4, 2020., The New Yorker, June 8 & 15, 2020.)	First Person Singular
2020	一人称単数; Ichininshō Tansū	"First Person Singular"	First Person Singular
2020	—	"The Kingdom That Failed" (The New Yorker, August 13, 2020) (Note: Murakami, Haruki, "The Kingdom That Failed", The New Yorker, August 13, 2020, The New Yorker, August 13, 2020.)	—
2023	—	"My Cheesecake-Shaped Poverty" (The New Yorker, September 7, 2023) (Note: Murakami, Haruki,, The New Yorker, September 7, 2023.)	—
2024	—	"Kaho" (The New Yorker, July 1, 2024) (Note: Murakami, Haruki, "Kaho", The New Yorker, July 1, 2024, The New Yorker, July 1, 2024.)	—

== Essays and nonfiction ==
English publication		Japanese publication	
Year	Title	Year	Title
N/A	Walk, Don't Run	1981	ウォーク・ドント・ラン : 村上龍 vs 村上春樹; Wōku donto ran = Walk, don't run: Murakami Ryū vs Murakami Haruki
N/A	Rain, Burning Sun (Come Rain or Come Shine)	1990	雨天炎天; Uten Enten
N/A	Portrait in Jazz	1997	ポ－トレイト・イン・ジャズ; Pōtoreito in jazu = Portrait in jazz
2000	Underground	1997	アンダーグラウンド; Andāguraundo = Underground
2000	Underground	1998	約束された場所で―underground 2 Yakusoku sareta basho de: Underground 2
N/A	Portrait in Jazz 2	2001	ポ－トレイト・イン・ジャズ 2 Pōtoreito in jazu 2 = Portrait in jazz 2
2008	What I Talk About When I Talk About Running	2007	走ることについて語るときに僕の語ること; Hashiru koto ni tsuite kataru toki ni boku no kataru koto
N/A	It Ain't Got that Swing (If It Don't Mean a Thing)	2008	意味がなければスイングはない; Imi ga nakereba suingu wa nai
2016	Absolutely on Music: Conversations	2011	小澤征爾さんと、音楽について話をする
2016	Haruki Murakami Goes to Meet Hayao Kawai	1996	村上春樹、河合隼雄に会いにいく
N/A	What Is There To Do In Laos?	2015	Raos ni ittai nani ga aru to iun desuka? (ラオスにいったい何があるというんですか?)
2019	Abandoning a Cat: Memories of my Father	2019	Neko o suteru chichioya ni tsuite kataru toki (猫を棄てるー父親について語るとき)
2021	Murakami T: The T-shirts I Love	2020	僕の愛したTシャツたち
2021	Murakami, Haruki (September 27, 2021). "Novelty T : an accidental collection". Showcase. The New Yorker. 97 (30). Translated by Philip Gabriel: 58–59. (Note: Online version is titled "An accidental collection".)		
2022	Novelist as a Vocation	2015	職業としての小説家; Shokugyō to shite no shōsetsuka

== Other books ==
Original publication		English publication	
Title	Year	Title	Year
バースデイ・ストーリーズ; Bāsudei sutōrīzu = Birthday stories	2002	Birthday Stories (anthology of stories by various authors selected and translated by Murakami, featuring one original story, "Birthday Girl," later collected in Blind Willow, Sleeping Woman)	2004
ふしぎな図書館; Fushigi na toshokan	2005	The Strange Library (illustrated children's novella, revised from his 1982 short story Toshokan kitan) (Note: Strange Library at The Complete Review.) (Note: Peschel, Joseph, "Book review: 'The Strange Library', by Haruki Murakami", The Washington Post, December 16, 2014.)	2014

== Murakami in popular culture and academia ==
- In 2021, Tokyo's new Haruki Murakami library at Waseda University was opened featuring Murakami's impressive global archive.
- In 2022, In Statu Nascendi published a special edition [edited by Joseph Thomas Milburn and Piotr Pietrzak] on Haruki Murakami to deliberate on the special relation between philosophy and an acclaimed Japanese literary writer. They argue that Murakami himself has been reluctant to expound on any deeper meaning to be found in his stories. The answer can be found in the great interest in and diverse engagement of readers with Murakami's work.
- In 2026, Murakami's "A Walk to Kobe" was used as one of seven stimulus sources for AP Seminar Performance Task 2.

By 2008, there were three non-fiction scholarly books in English about Murakami and his works. Timothy J. Van Compernolle of Amherst College wrote that the fact that many such books existed about "a living author in the relatively small field of Japanese literary studies in the English-speaking world is unprecedented."
