= Murakami T =

2020 book by Haruki Murakami

Murakami T: The T-Shirts I Love
- Author: Haruki Murakami
- Translator: Philip Gabriel
- Language: Japanese
- Publisher: Magazine House (Japanese); Knopf (English)
- Publication date: June 4, 2020 (Japanese); November 23, 2021 (English)
- ISBN: 978-4838731077

Murakami T: The T-Shirts I Love (村上T: 僕の愛したTシャツたち, Murakami T: boku no ai shita T-shatsutachi) is a book by Haruki Murakami that was originally serialized in Popeye from 2018 to 2020 before being published by Magazine House in 2020. It predominantly consists of pictures of T-shirts owned by Murakami with occasional personal essays. In 2021, an English translation by longtime collaborator Philip Gabriel was released by Knopf. The book's English release was accompanied by a collection of T-shirts and merchandise from Out of Print.

== Contents ==
The book showcases some of Murakami's T-shirts—most of them acquired while thrifting in Tokyo or while traveling—which he collects in cardboard boxes and frequently wears. Some of the T-shirts featured in the book are accompanied by essays.

In The New Yorker, a few months before the book's English release, Murakami shared some highlights of his T-shirt collection including T-shirts with phrases like "I put ketchup on my ketchup" and T-shirts branded after Heineken, Sigillum Universitatis Islandiae, and the Ramones. For The New York Times, Murakami stated that he never intended to amass such a large collection of T-shirts, though he found that wearing T-shirts represented "freedom" for him as a writer. In Vanity Fair, Murakami stated that the book came about during writing sessions when he was not "in the mood to write fiction" but nonetheless wanted to write something.

== Critical reception ==
Publishers Weekly called it a "collection of beguiling pieces" and a "charming ramble". Kirkus Reviews said the book "provides some surprising insights into the humble, real Murakami."

Vanity Fair noted that the book's writing possessed the "candid, unassuming tone that characterizes his nonfiction." The Atlantic wrote that the book was "part ode, part exhibit that reads with restrained affection for his accidental accumulations." The Japan Society said of the book: "As always, it's Murakami's mixture of casual friendliness paired with a kind of sagely wisdom that charms in the extreme."
