= First Person Singular (short story collection) =

2020 short story collection by Haruki Murakami

- First edition cover (Bungeishunjū, 2020)
- Author: Haruki Murakami
- Original title: Ichininshō Tansū (一人称単数)
- Translator: Philip Gabriel
- Cover artist: Tetsuya Toyoda
- Language: Japanese
- Genre: Short story collection
- Publisher: Bungeishunjū
- Publication date: 18 July 2020
- Publication place: Japan
- English publication date: 6 April 2021
- Media type: Print (hardcover), e-book
- Pages: 240
- ISBN: 978-4-16-391239-4 (hardcover)
- OCLC: 1176350511
- Dewey Decimal: 895.63/5
- LC Class: PL856.U673 A2 2021

First Person Singular (Japanese: 一人称単数, Hepburn: Ichininshō Tansū) is a collection of eight stories by Haruki Murakami. It was first published on 18 July 2020 by Bungeishunjū. As its title suggests, all eight stories in the book are told in a first-person singular narrative.

== Contents ==
Title	First publication in Japanese	First publication in English
"Cream" (クリーム, Kurīmu)	Bungakukai. July 2018.	The New Yorker. 28 January 2019.
"On a Stone Pillow" (石のまくらに, Ishi no Makura ni)	Bungakukai. July 2018.	—N/a
"Charlie Parker Plays Bossa Nova" (チャーリー・パーカー・プレイズ・ボサノヴァ, Chārī Pākā Pureizu Bosanova)	Bungakukai. July 2018.	Granta. No. 148. Summer 2019.
"With the Beatles" (ウィズ・ザ・ビートルズ, Wizu za Bītoruzu)	Bungakukai. August 2019.	The New Yorker. 17 & 24 February 2020.
"Confessions of a Shinagawa Monkey" (品川猿の告白, Shinagawa Saru no Kokuhaku)	Bungakukai. February 2020.	The New Yorker. 8 & 15 June 2020.
"Carnaval" (謝肉祭, Shanikusai)	Bungakukai. December 2019.	—N/a
The Yakult Swallows Poetry Collection (ヤクルト・スワローズ詩集, Yakuruto Suwarōzu Shishū)	Bungakukai. August 2019.	—N/a
"First Person Singular" (一人称単数, Ichininshō Tansū)	—N/a	—N/a

== Synopsis ==
=== "Cream" ===
The first-person narrator accepts a sudden invitation to a piano recital from an old acquaintance. On a Sunday afternoon in November, he travels to the recital hall, located at the top of a mountain in Kobe. When he arrives, the gate is locked and the parking lot empty. No one responds and there seems to be no signs of a recital set to take place. Retiring to a small park nearby, he later meets an old man who implores him to visualize a circle that has many centers but no circumference. The man tells him that when you finally achieve such difficult things as reaching an understanding of something you once couldn't, it becomes the cream of your life, the crème de la crème. The narrator closes his eyes once again and tries to visualize such a circle but is unable to. Upon opening his eyes, he discovers that the old man has vanished. The narrator recounts the event to a friend and attempts to make sense of the old man's musings.

=== "On a Stone Pillow" ===
A man reminisces about his time as a nineteen-year-old when he engaged in a sexual relationship with a tanka poet.

=== "Charlie Parker Plays Bossa Nova" ===
As a college student, the narrator writes a review for a fictional album by jazz saxophonist Charlie Parker entitled Charlie Parker Plays Bossa Nova. The album was recorded in 1963, contradicting the fact that Parker died in 1955. However, the editor of the university's literary journal publishes his piece as a serious review. Some years later, the narrator discovers his imagined album in a record store on East 14th Street.

=== "With the Beatles" ===
A man reminisces about his high school years in Kobe. He recalls a vivid memory from 1964 of a girl walking down a school hallway, clutching an LP copy of With the Beatles to her chest. The narrator then recalls his first girlfriend. Towards the end of autumn in 1965, he goes to her house to meet up for a date. He is met instead by her older brother of four years, who suffers from memory loss. Waiting for his girlfriend to arrive, the narrator reads aloud to her brother from the final part of Ryūnosuke Akutagawa's final short story, "Spinning Gears".

=== "Confessions of a Shinagawa Monkey" ===
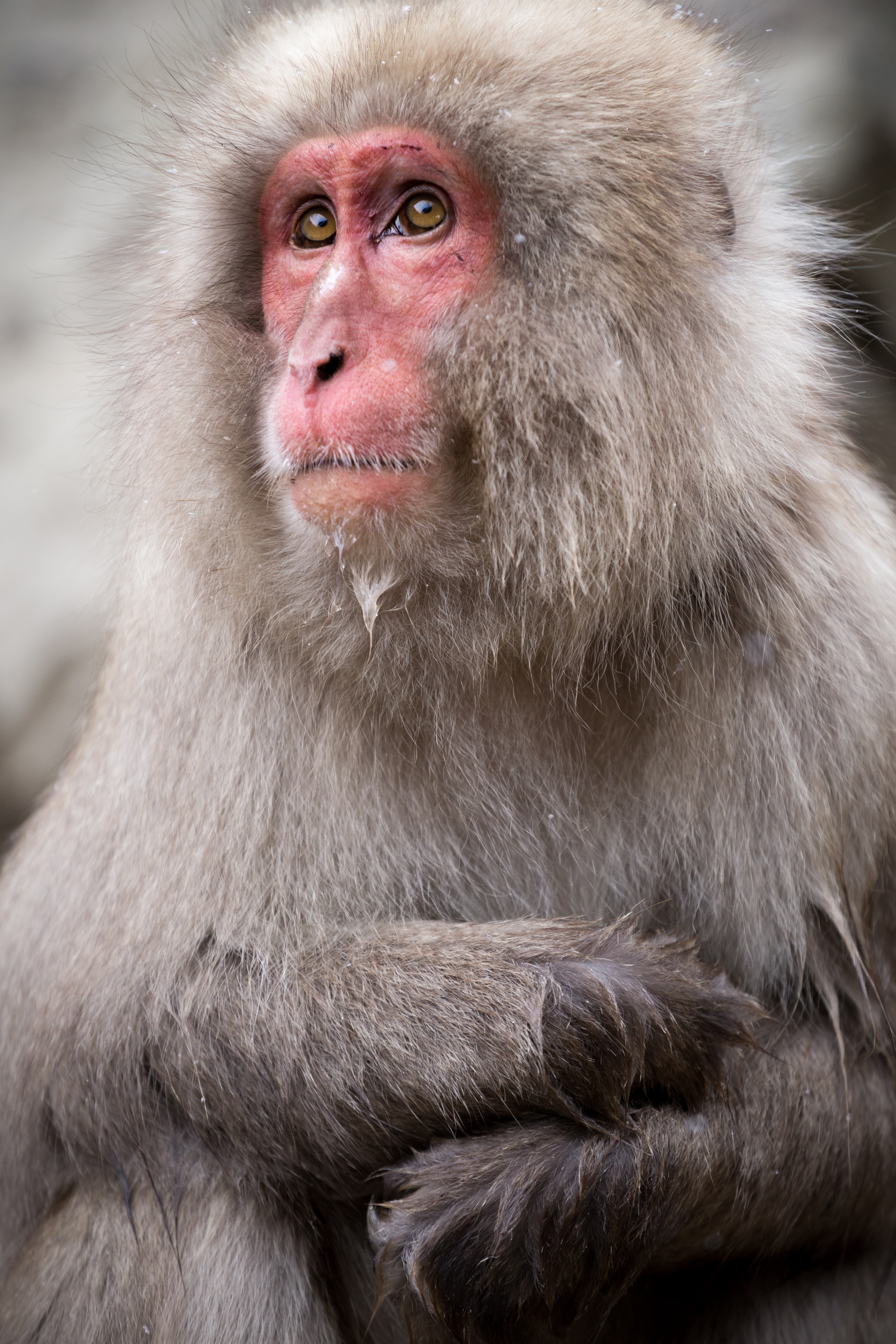
The Japanese macaque at a hot spring.

A sequel to "A Shinagawa Monkey". The narrator reminisces on five years earlier, when he met an elderly monkey living in a Japanese-style inn in a hot springs town in Gunma Prefecture. The talking monkey works in the ramshackle inn, scrubbing guests' backs. The monkey also drinks beer and enjoys Anton Bruckner's symphonies. The narrator invites the monkey to his room, where the monkey begins his confessions. The monkey tells the narrator how he came to love human females and how he would later steal the names of the women he fell for.

=== "Carnaval" ===
A fifty-year-old narrator reminisces on his relationship with the "ugliest" woman he has ever known. The woman, ten years the narrator's junior, is referred to as "F*". The two connect over their shared interest in music, including Robert Schumann's Carnaval.

=== The Yakult Swallows Poetry Collection ===
A man named Haruki Murakami details his affection for Tokyo Yakult Swallows baseball team. While at their Jingu Stadium in Tokyo, he begins to write poetry. Structured as a series of epigrams. The story blurs the lines between fiction and nonfiction, as the book entitled The Yakult Swallows Poetry Collection is a fabricated invention by Murakami for the story.

=== "First Person Singular" ===
A man sits at a bar and a "friend of a friend" begins to berate him about a "horrible, awful thing" he has no memory of.

== Style and themes ==
As its title suggests, all eight stories in the book are told in a first-person singular narrative. The book's eight stories are works of fiction. However, as in the case of The Yakult Swallows Poetry Collection, the lines between fiction and nonfiction are occasionally blurred. The stories in the collection are all told by middle-aged male narrators who are reflecting and reminiscing on a memory from their past. Except for "Haruki Murakami" in The Yakult Swallows Poetry Collection, all of the narrators in the stories are unnamed. The continuous usage of the first-person singular has led some to question whether the collection has a single narrator. The older male narrators, with their affinity for jazz music and baseball, have also been noted for having a striking similarity to Murakami himself. As such, critics have questioned whether the stories in the collection are fictional or a different form of autobiography or memoir.

The stories include philosophical meditations on love, solitude, loneliness, ageing, time, and memory. The eight stories are linked by a sustained sense of existential nostalgia and the recurring theme of music, including classical, jazz and The Beatles. The nostalgia within the stories is marked by its reminiscence of young love, occasionally of an erotic nature. The book also includes an essay/story about baseball, a recurring theme for Murakami since his debut novel Hear the Wind Sing (1979) which he was inspired to write after watching an afternoon baseball game between the Yakult Swallows and the Hiroshima Carp at Jingu Stadium in April 1978. Murakami also exercises his signature magic realism, such as in "Charlie Parker Plays Bossa Nova" and "Confessions of a Shinagawa Monkey". In "Confessions of a Shinagawa Monkey", Murakami's surrealism is displayed with the blurring of dreams and reality.

== Publication ==
The book's title story, "First Person Singular", is a new story that was previously unpublished. The other seven stories in the book were first published in the literary magazine Bungakukai between summer 2018 and winter 2020. Several stories in the book were also previously published in English in The New Yorker and Granta.

The book was announced on 4 June 2020. It was first published on 18 July 2020 by Bungeishunjū. The book's cover artwork was done by Tetsuya Toyoda. An English translation by Philip Gabriel was published on 6 April 2021 by Alfred A. Knopf (US) and Harvill Secker (UK). It is Murakami's first collection of short stories since Men Without Women (2014) and his first published book since the novel Killing Commendatore (2017).

== Reception ==
In its starred review, Publishers Weekly called the collection a "testament to Murakami's talent and enduring creativity" and wrote that "Murakami's gift for evocative, opaque magical realism" stood out in the stories "Charlie Parker Plays Bossa Nova" and "Confessions of a Shinagawa Monkey". Kirkus Reviews, in its starred review, called it an "essential addition to any Murakami fan's library".

The English translation debuted at number eleven on The New York Times fiction best-seller list for the week ending April 10, 2021.

First Person Singular was longlisted for the 2022 Andrew Carnegie Medal for Excellence in Fiction.
