= Drive My Car =

Drive My Car may refer to

- "Drive My Car" (song), 1965 song by The Beatles
- "Drive My Car" (short story), from the 2014 Men Without Women collection by Haruki Murakami
  - Drive My Car (film), 2021 Japanese drama-road film adaptation directed by Ryusuke Hamaguchi
