= After the Quake =

Book by Haruki Murakami

after the quake
- First US edition cover
- Author: Haruki Murakami
- Original title: 神の子どもたちはみな踊る; Kami no Kodomo-tachi wa Mina Odoru
- Translator: Jay Rubin
- Language: Japanese
- Genre: Short story collection
- Published: February 2000 (Shinchosha) (JP); August 13, 2002 (Knopf) (US)
- Publication place: Japan
- Media type: Print (Hardcover)
- Pages: 201 (JP); 192 (US)
- ISBN: 0-375-41390-1
- OCLC: 43797498
- LC Class: PL856.U673 K36 2000

after the quake (神の子どもたちはみな踊る, Kami no Kodomo-tachi wa Mina Odoru; lit. "All God's Children Dance") is a collection of six short stories by Japanese author Haruki Murakami, written between 1999 and 2000. First published in Japan in 2000, it was released in English as after the quake in 2002 (translator Jay Rubin notes that Murakami "insisted" the title "should be all lower-case").

== Background ==
The stories were written in response to Japan's 1995 Kobe earthquake, and each story is affected peripherally by the disaster. Along with Underground, a collection of interviews and essays about the 1995 Tokyo gas attacks, and The Wind-Up Bird Chronicle, a complex exploration of Japan's modern history, after the quake represents part of an effort on the part of Murakami to adopt a more purposeful exploration of the Japanese national conscience.

The stories in after the quake repeat motifs, themes, and elements common in much of Murakami's earlier short stories and novels, but also present some notable stylistic changes. All six stories are told in the third person, as opposed to Murakami's much more familiar first person narrative established in his previous work. Additionally, only one of the stories contains clear supernatural elements, which are present in the vast majority of Murakami's stories. All of the stories are set in February 1995, the month between the Kobe earthquake and the Tokyo gas attacks. Translator Jay Rubin says of the collection, "The central characters in after the quake live far from the physical devastation, which they witness only on TV or in the papers, but for each of them the massive destruction unleashed by the earth itself becomes a turning point in their lives. They are forced to confront an emptiness they have borne inside them for years."

== Contents ==
Story	Originally published in English in
"UFO in Kushiro"	The New Yorker
"Landscape with Flatiron"	Ploughshares
"All God's Children Can Dance"	Harper's
"Thailand"	Granta
"Super-Frog Saves Tokyo"	GQ
"Honey Pie"	The New Yorker

== Synopsis ==
=== "UFO in Kushiro" ===
Komura, an early-thirties salesman living in Tokyo, comes home from work five days after the quake to find that his wife of five years has left him. She leaves a note saying that living with him is like living with a "chunk of air" and that other women would be lucky to be with him down the road. About a week later, he takes a week-long leave of absence. Before he leaves work that day, his friend Sasaki asks him if he would like to take an all-expenses-paid trip to Kushiro to deliver a small package to Sasaki's sister Keiko; he says yes.

At the airport, he is greeted by Keiko and her friend Shimao. After a slight confusion regarding Keiko thinking that his wife has died rather than left him, they go to a noodle house for a meal. There, the two women tell him the story of how a woman left her husband after a UFO sighting. Afterwards, the three go to a love hotel; Keiko knows the owner and says he can stay there for the duration of his trip. After taking a bath, he finds that Keiko has left, leaving him and Shimao alone. He asks Shimao about a "bear story" he heard them mention earlier; she tells him the story: when Shimao was in high school, she and her boyfriend had sex in the woods and they perpetually rang a bell during intercourse to keep bears away. After finishing the story, she goes to take a bath.

When she returns to the room, the two try to have intercourse but Komura is unable to commit himself, mentioning earlier that he does not find interest in anyone other than his wife. They talk instead; he tells her that his wife left him because he was like a "chunk of air" and then asks her what was in the package. She insinuates that the package was just a "chunk of air," which upsets him. After Shimao apologizes for the joke, Komura lies down again and ruminates about his excursion to Kushiro.

=== "Landscape with Flatiron" ===
Junko, a runaway, and Keisuke- a surfer and rock music enthusiast- share a place in a small seaside town in the Ibaraki Prefecture. One day right before midnight, they receive a call from mid-forty-year-old Miyake asking if they want to come to the beach to light a bonfire together; they go to join him.

At the beach they talk about a number of things, including the recent quake, Miyake's Kansai dialect, and why Miyake likes lighting bonfires on the beach. Junko also thinks about Jack London's "To Build a Fire" and her contrarian interpretation of how the man fundamentally longs for death. They also drink Suntory together; Keisuke departs after a few drinks leaving Junko and Miyake alone. The two then talk about Miyake's family and a recent painting Miyake finished, Landscape with Flatiron, and its cryptic meaning. As the bonfires dies, they talk about dreams and death; Miyake says he often dreams that he horrifyingly dies trapped in a refrigerator and mentions that Jack London also thought he was going to drown to death so he killed himself with morphine instead. As they sit together thinking about death, Junko drifts to sleep.

=== "All God's Children Can Dance" ===
Yoshiya goes to work late after waking up with a hangover. That evening, while transferring between subway lines to get home, he sees a man in his mid-fifties who has a missing earlobe and decides to follow him surreptitiously.

Yoshiya lives with his mother, who has recently been away helping her religious group provide earthquake relief. When he was young he was told by his fatherlike "special guide" Mr. Tabata that his father is "Our Lord." When he is in high school he learns that his father, according to his mother, is an obstetrician who she "had knowledge" of during her high school days; she had been seeing this man because she needed advice regarding abortions and contraception. That man was adamant about Yoshiya not being his child and had an accident in his childhood in which a dog bit off one of his earlobes.

The man who Yoshiya follows gets off at a station in the Chiba Prefecture and hails down a cab; Yoshiya is able to get a cab to follow the man. The man gets out at a remote location full of walls and barbed wire and walks away; Yoshiya follows him. After traveling through a scrap yard and several walls, they end up at a baseball field and the man vanishes. After surveying the field, he proceeds to dance, feeling as if he is being tested by God. During this dance, he thinks of several things: his mother and her life; how he refused to marry his girlfriend in college because he said the son of God can't marry; how before Mr. Tabata died a few years ago, he confessed that he lusts for Yoshiya's mother despite being married and having children. In that moment, Yoshiya wanted to confess to Mr. Tabata that he has incestuous feelings for his mother, but decided to hold back out of respect for his guide. After he finishes dancing, he kneels on the pitcher's mound and feels the wind dance around him and says aloud, "Oh God."

=== "Thailand" ===
Satsuki, a thyroid doctor, travels to Bangkok for the World Thyroid Conference. On her flight, the PA asks if anyone is a doctor; she thinks about reasons not to volunteer but ultimately does. After the conference concludes, she takes a week long excursion to a hotel in the mountains. She is picked up by a Mercedes limo by driver Nimit. She talks with Nimit about jazz and the quake; they also talk about her former husband who left her because he said that she did not want to have children.

Nimit helps her find a pool away from the hotel and chauffeurs her there every day for five days; he also provides her with lunch. On the final trip to the pool, he asks her for an hour of her time and she accepts. He takes her to a poverty-stricken village to see an elderly soothsayer. She tells Satsuki that she had a white stone about the size of a child's fist inside of her; to rid of it she will have a dream in which she will have to hold a snake until it swallows the stone for her.

Before she returns home, she gives Nimit a gift of $100 and asks if he wants to have coffee; he agrees. While they drink at the cafe, she begins to tell the story of her father but Nimit interrupts her and tells her to have her dream first. He then tells the story of her former employer, a Norwegian gem dealer from Lapland; Satsuki wonders if they were lovers. He then tells the story of how polar bears mate once a year and how the males run away afterwards and both wonder about the existential meaning of the story. As the plane takes off, Satsuki thinks of a fond jazz piece as she falls asleep.

=== "Super-Frog Saves Tokyo" ===
A few days after the quake, a six-feet-tall frog waits for Katagiri to come home from work. Frog tells Katagiri that he is going to save Tokyo from an earthquake and needs his help. Katagiri learns that he can help by cheering for Frog as he battles with a Worm under the Tokyo Security Trust Bank, Katagiri's workplace. To prove his loyalty to Katagiri, Frog resolves a bank case for him; after this, Katagiri agrees to help Frog. They plan to meet on February 17 (the day before Worm will cause the earthquake) under the bank but on that day as Katagiri is returning to the bank from his rounds, he is "shot."

Katagiri wakes up in the hospital the next morning; he asks the nurse if he has been shot and if there has been an earthquake and she says neither has happened. That night, Frog visits to tell Katagiri that they were successful in the battle against Worm but the battle was fought to a draw. Afterwards, Frog’s skin bursts and bug like creatures begins to eat Katagiri alive; he wakes up to learn that the horrifying experience is a dream. He tells the nurse of Frog's success before falling asleep again.

=== "Honey Pie" ===
Junpei tells young Sala the story of Masakichi, an anthropomorphic bear who sells honey. She says that Masakichi should sell honey pies to increase his profit and Junpei agrees. After she falls asleep, he talks with Sala's mother Sayoko in the kitchen about taking the girl to the Ueno Zoo. She agrees and tells him to also invite Sala's father Takatsuki.

Junpei grew up in Nishinomiya and, after graduating from high school, went to study literature at Waseda University. During his first term there, he meets Takatsuki and Sayoko; the three become close friends. Not wanting to ruin their friendship, he suppresses his feelings for Sayoko. A few months later, he learns that Takatsuki asked Sayoko out. He is unsure how to feel, but does not harbor any enmity towards Takatsuki; however, he stops showing up for class. Worried, Sayoko shows up at his place to check up on him and convinces him to return to school. After graduation, Junpei finds solace in writing short stories and submitting them for publication. His parents also discover that he lied to them about studying business and they disown him; nonetheless his literary careers shows promise. Sayoko studies literature in graduate school and Takatsuki becomes a journalist. Sayoko becomes pregnant with Sala shortly after she turns thirty and shortly before Sala is born, Takatsuki reveals that he knows Sayoko liked Junpei more than she liked him when they were in school; nonetheless, he admits that she is the "greatest woman in the world."

After Sala's second birthday, Junpei learns that Takatsuki cheated on Sayoko with a co-worker, an affair that started before Sala was born; the two divorce months later. Junpei fills the void and is eventually told by Takatsuki that he should marry Sayoko; Junpei is unsure regarding whether it is the right thing to do. Two years later, the quake occurs while Junpei is in Barcelona but he returns to Tokyo as soon as possible; he does not, however, reach out to his parents who live near Kobe.

Takatsuki is unable to join the three on their trip to the zoo due to him securing an interview in Okinawa at the last minute. Nonetheless, the three go and when Sala sees a bear, Junpei tells her a story about how it is Tonkichi, Masakichi's friend who catches salmon. Tonkichi was caught in a trap and that is the reason he is in the zoo rather than living in the wild. During dinner that night, Sala asks her mother to do the bra trick in which she takes off her bra with one hand and puts it back on; Sayoko refuses, but when Sala says she will go to sleep if she does it, Sayoko does it and sets a new time record. After Sala is asleep, she admits to Junpei that she did not put it back on. They then proceed to have intercourse on the living room couch and Junpei continually holds back on ejaculation, not wanting the moment to end. However before they can finish they are interrupted by Sala who abruptly wakes up and says she has had a bad dream, as Sayoko proceeds to comfort her. That night, while Sayoko and Sala sleep together in the same bed, Junpei watches over them and decides that he will ask Sayoko to marry him when she wakes up.

== Adaptations ==
BBC Radio 3 broadcast a dramatized adaptation of after the quake on September 16, 2007. The single 88 minute episode covered four of the six stories from the book: UFO in Kushiro, Thailand, Super-Frog Saves Tokyo and Honey Pie.

Honey Pie and Superfrog Saves Tokyo have been adapted for the stage and directed by Frank Galati. Entitled after the quake, the play was first performed at the Steppenwolf Theatre Company in association with La Jolla Playhouse, and opened October 12, 2007 at Berkeley Repertory Theatre.

A film adaptation directed by Tsuyoshi Inoue was released in 2025.
