= Kafka on the Shore =

2002 novel by Haruki Murakami

- First edition (Japanese)
- Author: Haruki Murakami
- Original title: 海辺のカフカ; Umibe no Kafuka
- Translator: Philip Gabriel
- Language: Japanese
- Genre: Magical realism
- Published: 2002 (Shinchosha) (JP); January 2005 (EN)
- Publication place: Japan
- Media type: Print (Hardcover)
- Pages: 505
- ISBN: 1-84343-110-6
- OCLC: 56805021

Kafka on the Shore (海辺のカフカ, Umibe no Kafuka) is a 2002 novel by Japanese author Haruki Murakami. Its 2005 English translation was among "The 10 Best Books of 2005" selected by The New York Times and received the World Fantasy Award for 2006. The book tells the stories of the young Kafka Tamura, a bookish 15-year-old boy who runs away from his Oedipal curse, and Satoru Nakata, an old, mentally disabled man with the uncanny ability to talk to cats. The book incorporates themes of music as a communicative conduit, metaphysics, dreams, fate, and the subconscious.

After the release of the book, Murakami allowed for questions about the novel to be sent in, and responded to many of them. The novel was generally well-received, with positive reviews from John Updike and The New York Times.

== Title ==
The title of the book, according to Alan Cheuse of NPR, is suggestive and mysterious to Japanese readers in the way that a title such as Genji on the Hudson would be to Americans, because Franz Kafka is not well-known in Japan. Psychoanalyst Hayao Kawai saw special meaning in the name Kafka, as its Japanese version, Kafuka (Japanese: カフカ), could be a combination of 可 (ka, meaning 'possible' or 'good') and 不可 (fuka, meaning 'bad' or 'unacceptable', the opposite), thus giving the book liminality.

== Plot ==
The plot follows two distinct but interrelated narratives. Odd-numbered chapters tell the story of Kafka, while even-numbered chapters tell Nakata's story.

Kafka's story

Fifteen-year-old Kafka lives with his father. His mother left when he was young, taking his older sister with her. Kafka runs away from his home in Tokyo. He discusses his thoughts with his imaginary friend Crow. Kafka’s father prophesies that Kafka will kill his father and have sex with both his mother and sister.

On a bus to Shikoku, Kafka meets a girl named Sakura who appears to be around the same age as his sister. Before they part, Sakura gives Kafka her phone number.

Kafka visits the Komura Memorial Library in Takamatsu. He befriends Oshima, a transgender man who works at the front desk. He also meets Mrs. Saeki, Oshima's boss.

One night, Kafka awakens covered in blood with no memory of the previous hours. He calls Sakura for help. He confesses that he is a runaway who has lied about his age. She provides reassurance and performs manual sex on him. Later, Kafka also confides in Oshima. Kafka stays at Oshima's family cabin for a few days; Oshima secures the boy a job at the library.

Oshima tells Kafka about Mrs. Saeki's life. She once produced a popular song entitled "Kafka on the Shore", but after the death of her boyfriend she never sang again. Kafka begins living in the room once inhabited by Ms. Saeki's deceased boyfriend. This room has a painting of a young boy by the seaside, also entitled "Kafka on the Shore".

Kafka learns that his father has been found stabbed to death. He denies killing his father, but he realizes that his father died on the night when Kafka awoke covered in blood.

Kafka sees the ghost of a young girl in his room and falls in love with her; he eventually realizes that she is a young Mrs. Saeki. Kafka listens to her song, which contains surreal images of an "entrance stone" and fish raining from the sky. Kafka asks Ms. Saeki if she has children; she declines to answer. Later, she visits Kafka's room. While still asleep, she undresses and has sex with Kafka. The next morning, she does not appear to remember this incident. Kafka confesses his love; they have sex again.

The police search for Kafka. Oshima brings Kafka back to the cabin. That night, Kafka dreams of visiting Sakura's room. In the dream, he begins having sex with the sleeping Sakura. She awakens and accuses him of raping his own sister. Kafka awakens alone. He wanders into the woods. He discusses his missing mother with Crow. He passes through a metaphysical "entrance" and visits a small village deep in the forest.

Kafka meets the fifteen-year-old Mrs. Saeki, who does not recognize him. Crow meets the spirit of an adult man, who claims to be in limbo. The spirit has a flute made out of cat souls. Crow attacks the man, but cannot stop his progress towards the village. The ghost of the adult Mrs. Saeki meets Kafka, revealing that she has died. She asks him to leave the village before the entrance closes. He calls her "mother" and forgives her.

Kafka returns to the cabin, then to the library. He learns that Ms. Saeki has bequeathed him the painting of "Kafka on the Shore." He plans to return to Tokyo and says farewell to Oshima. He calls Sakura and asks to meet up again in Tokyo in the future. On the bus back to Tokyo, Kafka speaks to Crow.

Nakata's story

During World War II, a strange incident occurs in Yamanashi Prefecture. Multiple children collapse. Most recover completely, but a boy Nakata awakens with a cognitive disability.

Decades later, Nakata lives on government assistance. He has gained the ability to speak to cats. While searching for a lost pet, Nakata meets a man named Johnnie Walker. Walker tortures and kills cats, stating that he will use their souls to create a magical flute. Walker orders Nakata to kill him; Nakata stabs him to death. He awakens to find that his clothes have no blood on them. Nakata attempts to confess the murder to a police officer, who does not believe him. Nakata predicts that fish will rain from the sky; the next day, this prediction comes true.

Nakata begins hitchhiking. He meets a truck driver named Hoshino. Nakata states that he is looking for an “entrance stone”. In Shikoku, Hoshino and Nakata search for the stone. A pimp, claiming to be a metaphysical creature, leads Hoshino to the stone. Hoshino flips over the stone; Nakata feels than an entrance has been opened somewhere.

The two men visit the Komura Memorial Library. Nakata discusses the stone with Mrs. Saeki. She gives Nakata the manuscript of her autobiography and asks him to burn it. After Nakata leaves, Oshima finds Mrs. Saeki dead at her desk.

Nakata burns the manuscript. The next morning, Hoshino finds that Nakata has died in his sleep. Hoshino talks to the stone, reminiscing about the failures of his life. He sees a cat and finds that he can speak to it. The cat warns Hoshino of a dangerous spirit. Later, a worm-like monster emerges from Nakata’s mouth. Hoshino closes the entrance stone and destroys the creature.

== Major themes ==
The power and beauty of music as a communicative medium is one of the central ideas of the novel—the very title comes from a song Kafka is given on a record in the library. The music of Beethoven, specifically the Archduke Trio, is also used as a redemptive metaphor. Metaphysics is also a central concept of the novel as many of the character's dialogues and soliloquy are motivated by their inquiry about the nature of the world around them and their relation to it. Among other prominent ideas are the virtues of self-sufficiency, the relation of dreams and reality, the threat of fate, the uncertain grip of prophecy, and the influence of the subconscious.

== Style ==
Kafka on the Shore demonstrates Murakami's typical blend of popular culture, mundane detail, magical realism, suspense, humor, an involved plot, and potent sexuality. It also features an increased emphasis on Japanese religious traditions, particularly Shinto. The main characters are significant departures from the typical protagonist of a Murakami novel, such as Toru Watanabe of Norwegian Wood and Toru Okada of The Wind-Up Bird Chronicle, who are typically in their 20s or 30s and have rather humdrum personalities. However, many of the same concepts that were first developed in these and other previous novels reoccur in Kafka on the Shore.

G. W. F. Hegel's thought influenced the book and is referenced directly at one point.

== Characters ==
Kafka Tamura

The character's true given name is never revealed to the reader. After running away from home, he chooses the new name "Kafka", in honor of writer Franz Kafka. Kafka is described as being muscular for his age and a "cool, tall, fifteen-year-old boy lugging a backpack and a bunch of obsessions". He's also the son of the famous sculptor Koichi Tamura. His mother and sister left the family when he was four years old and he can't remember their faces. He occasionally interacts with his metaphysical alter ego "The boy named Crow" ("Kafka" sounds like "kavka", which means "jackdaw", a crow-like bird, in Czech). Crow tells Kafka throughout the novel that he must be "the toughest fifteen-year-old in the world" and thus motivates him to pursue the journey of running away from home. It is heavily suggested throughout the novel that he, Miss Saeki, and Nakata are somehow connected by an 'alternate reality' on which metaphysical objects from people's subconsciousness take form leading them to find an "essence" to their lives in exchange for taking away a "part" of their soul.

Satoru Nakata

Nakata lost many of his mental faculties when he was a child; as one of sixteen schoolchildren on a mushroom-gathering field-trip toward the end of World War II, they were rendered unconscious following a mysterious flash of light in the sky (although it is later revealed that the light wasn't the main cause). This event is referred to in the novel as the "Rice Bowl Hill incident". Unlike the other children, who recovered shortly after, Nakata remained unconscious for many weeks and, upon finally awakening, found that his memory and ability to read had disappeared, as well as his higher intellectual functions (i.e. abstract thinking), essentially making him a "blank slate". In their place, Nakata found he was able to communicate with cats, and from then on, he always referred to himself in the third person. It is hinted that Nakata and Miss Saeki have been through the "alternate reality" before and it's where they left a "part" of their "soul", leading to their shadows being irregular compared to normal people's.

Oshima
A 21-year-old, intellectual, haemophiliac, and gay transgender man. He is a librarian and an owner of a cabin in the mountains near Komura Memorial Library who becomes close to Kafka and guides him to the answers that he seeks on his journey.
Hoshino
A truck driver in his mid-twenties. He befriends Nakata, due to his resemblance to his own grandfather, and transports and assists him towards his uncertain goal.
Miss Saeki
The manager of a private library, where Oshima works and where Kafka lives through much of the novel. She was previously a singer, and performed the song "Kafka on the Shore", which unites many of the novel's themes. Although her outward appearance is normal, she has suffered from an existential crisis since the death of her boyfriend. She journeyed to the "alternate reality" when she was 15 years old due to her strong desire to keep her happiness forever, eventually discovering the "essence" used to compose "Kafka on the Shore". However it led to that version of herself "separating" from her.
Sakura
A young woman whom Kafka meets on the bus by chance. She allows him to stay at her apartment during his journey. Kafka has a dream in which he sexually assaults her, something he feels conflicted over, but a later phone conversation suggests she has no knowledge of it, indicating that unlike his other dreams it did not happen in the "alternate reality".
Johnnie Walker
A cat killer who plans to make a flute out of cats' souls. His name is taken from Johnnie Walker, a brand of Scotch whisky, and he dresses to appear like the man featured in the brand's logo.
Colonel Sanders
An "abstract concept" who takes the form of a pimp or hustler. He is named after, and takes the appearance of, Harland Sanders, the founder and face of Kentucky Fried Chicken. He helps Hoshino to find the "entrance stone" to the "alternate reality".

== Analysis ==
Scholar Michael Seats compared the liminality of the novel to Jacques Derrida's exegesis of the concept of pharmakon. According to Seats, the novel's interpretations can be contradictory, and many can be correct.

Through the lens of psychoanalytic theory, Kafka is a schizoid character suffering from a deep Oedipal curse. Kafka's heart is Kafka, his self-constructed personality, while his unconscious, the one who fulfilled the Oedipal prophecy of father-killing when he turned 15, is Crow. The character Sakura is interpreted as the embodiment of the "healed" personality, who is able to connect to the real world well. Kafka, stuck in the mirror stage, cannot cope with her care, as she has power over the symbolic order. The character Oshima represents the mind-body-spirit split within Kafka. The character Johnnie Walker is a symbol of Julia Kristeva's concept of the partially constituted subject.

== Understanding the novel ==
After the story's release, Murakami's Japanese publisher invited readers to submit questions to its website on the meaning of the book. Murakami responded personally to around 1,200 of the 8,000 questions received. A subset of the answers were later published in a book titled 少年カフカ ("Shōnen Kafka"; literally, The Boy Kafka, but the title is a play on shōnen manga as the design of the Q&A book is based on that of shōnen mangas).

In an interview posted on his English-language website, Murakami says that the secret to understanding the novel lies in reading it several times: "Kafka on the Shore contains several riddles, but there aren't any solutions provided. Instead, several of these riddles combine, and through their interaction the possibility of a solution takes shape. And the form this solution takes will be different for each reader. To put it another way, the riddles function as part of the solution. It's hard to explain, but that's the kind of novel I set out to write".

== Reception ==
John Updike described it as a "real page-turner, as well as an insistently metaphysical mind-bender". Kirkus Reviews called it "A masterpiece, entirely Nobel-worthy." Since its 2005 English-language release (2006 PEN/Book-of-the-Month Club Translation Prize-winning translation by Philip Gabriel), the novel has received mostly positive reviews and critical acclaim, including a spot on The New York Times 10 Best Books of 2005 and the World Fantasy Award.

David Mitchell, in The Guardian, said that although the novel was "not one of Murakami's masterpieces", he nonetheless considered it "an inventive, alluring, striving novel".
