= Novelist as a Vocation =

2022 essay collection by Haruki Murakami

- Author: Haruki Murakami
- Original title: 職業としての小説家; Shokugyō to shite no Shōsetsuka
- Translator: Philip Gabriel; Ted Goossen
- Language: Japanese
- Genre: Essay
- Published: 2015 (Switch Publishing) (JP); 2022 (Knopf) (US); 2022 (Harvill Secker) (UK); 2022 (Doubleday Canada) (CA)
- Publication place: Japan
- Media type: Print (Hardcover)
- Pages: 224 (US Hardcover)
- ISBN: 978-0-451-49464-1

Novelist as a Vocation (職業としての小説家, Shokugyō to shite no Shōsetsuka) is an essay collection written by Haruki Murakami published by Switch Publishing on 10 September 2015. An English translation by Philip Gabriel and Ted Goossen was released on 8 November 2022 by Alfred A. Knopf in the US, by Harvill Secker in the UK and by Doubleday Canada in Canada.

== Summary ==
Novelist as a Vocation is a collection of essays. The first chapter of the book is "Are Novelists Broad-minded?". In the book there is an essay about Haruki Murakami with the title “How I Became a Novelist”.

== Critical reception ==
The book received mixed reviews from critics, receiving praise for its insight into Murakami's life and career, as well as criticism for its loose structure and advice to novelists.

Charles Finch of The New York Times described the book as "assured, candid and often [...] deeply irritating."

Huda Awan of The Irish Times and Philip Hensher of The Daily Telegraph wrote that some of Murakami's writing advice seemed "bizarre," with Hensher commenting that it contains "startlingly banal observations on the writer's world."

Sean O'Hagan of The Guardian and Mini Kapoor of The Hindu both praised the book for its exploration of Murakami's mind and writing process.

The book was reviewed by Chris Rutledge of Washington Independent Review of Books, Karthik Keramalu of Firstpost, Brendan Daly of Business Post, Thu-Huong Ha of The Japan Times, Nick Duerden of The i and Paul Perry of Sunday Independent of Ireland.

Books Kinokuniya bought 90 percent of first print run of the book.
