= Kuroi Senji =

Japanese writer (1932–2026)

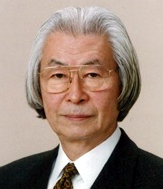
Senji in 2014

Osabe Shunjirō (長部 瞬二郎; 28 May 1932 – 12 October 2026), better known by the pen name of Kuroi Senji (黒井 千次), was a Japanese author of fiction and essays.

Senji was born in Tokyo on 28 May 1932. He earned a degree in economics from the University of Tokyo in 1955, and became a junior executive at Fuji Heavy Industries. He began publishing fiction under his pen name in the 1950s, and resigned from Fuji in 1970 to devote himself to writing full-time.

Senji was a member of the "Introspective Generation" of Japanese writers, whose work depicts the thoughts of ordinary Japanese. He lived in Tokyo's western suburbs, along the Chūō Main Line, in a neighborhood similar to that depicted in his novel of linked stories, Gunsei (Life in the Cul-de-Sac, 群棲), for which he won the 1984 Tanizaki Prize.

As of 2006 he was president of the Japan Writer's Association (Nihon Bungeika Kyokai).

Senji died from pneumonia on 12 October 2026, at the age of 94.

== Selected works ==
- Jikan (Time, 時間), 1969.
- Gunsei (Life in the Cul-de-Sac, 群棲), 1984. Translated to English as Life in the Cul-de-Sac, trans. Philip Gabriel, Stone Bridge Press, 2001. ISBN 1-880656-57-4.
- Hane to tsubasa (Feathers and Wings), Kodansha, 2000. ISBN 4-06-210257-9.
- Ichinichi yume no saku (A Day in the Life), Kodansha, 2006. Translated to English as A Day in the Life, trans. Giles Murray, Dalkey Archive Press, 2013. ISBN 978-1-56478-865-8.
