= After Dark (novel) =

2004 novel by Haruki Murakami

after dark
- First edition (Japanese)
- Author: Haruki Murakami
- Original title: アフターダーク; Afutā Dāku
- Translator: Jay Rubin
- Language: Japanese
- Publisher: Kodansha (Japan); Harvill Press (UK); Alfred A. Knopf (US)
- Publication date: 2004
- Publication place: Japan
- English publication date: May 2007
- Media type: Print (Hardcover)
- Pages: 208
- ISBN: 0-307-26583-8 (US); 1-84655-047-5 (UK)
- OCLC: 81861840

After Dark (アフターダーク, Afutā Dāku) is a 2004 novel by Japanese author Haruki Murakami. It is set in metropolitan Tokyo over the course of one night.

== Plot summary ==
In a Denny's restaurant, late at night, Mari Asai is reading alone. She is approached by Tetsuya Takahashi, a trombone player who claims to have once been on a double date with Mari and her sister, Eri Asai. When Takahashi leaves, a woman named Kaoru asks Mari (who speaks Chinese) to translate for an injured woman. Kaoru takes Mari to Alphaville, the love hotel which Kaoru manages, and Mari is able to translate the words of a beaten prostitute into Japanese.

At home, Eri remains in a strange deep sleep. An unplugged television in the bedroom with her shows strange images of a masked man sitting in a chair, who appears to be able to see through the screen into her room.

Kaoru takes Mari to a bar, then sends Mari to stay at a different hotel. Kaoru and her staff search for Shirakawa, the man who hurt the prostitute. At three a.m., Takahashi meets Mari again. They discuss law, which Takahashi is studying.

Eri briefly regains consciousness, but realises she has been absorbed into the room on the other side of the television screen, which resembles Shirakawa’s office.

Takahashi says he once had a meaningful conversation with Eri, and felt concerned for her, but does not know what he would say if he spoke to her now. Mari confesses that Eri has been in a deep sleep for months, and doesn't want to wake up. Takahashi wants to see Mari again, but Mari admits she is leaving for Beijing soon. However, Takahashi promises to write to her.

Mari returns home to find Eri still sleeping in her bedroom. She gets into bed with Eri, who shows a tiny sign of movement. By now, it is starting to get light outside and the city is waking up.

== Reception ==
Walter Kirn, for The New York Times, lauded Murakami's ability to take a birds-eye view of his nightly world: "Standing sentry above the common gloom, Murakami detects phosphorescence everywhere, but chiefly in the auras around people, which glow brightest at night and when combined but fade at dawn, when we go our separate ways."

Steven Poole, in The Guardian, appreciated the book's style: "After Dark is perhaps the closest Murakami has yet come to composing a pure tone-poem ... Exposition is set to the minimum, while the mood-colouring is virtuosic."
