= The City and Its Uncertain Walls =

2023 novel by Haruki Murakami

- Author: Haruki Murakami
- Original title: 街とその不確かな壁 (Machi to Sono Futashika na Kabe)
- Language: Japanese
- Publisher: Shinchosha
- Publication date: 13 April 2023
- English publication date: 19 November 2024
- Media type: Print and digital
- Pages: 672

The City and Its Uncertain Walls (Japanese: 街とその不確かな壁, Hepburn: Machi to Sono Futashika na Kabe) is a novel written by Japanese writer Haruki Murakami that was released on April 13, 2023. Philip Gabriel's English translation was published on November 19, 2024 in Britain and United States. The novel shares its title with an earlier short story of the same name, which was published in the September 1980 issue of Bungakukai.

== Background ==
Murakami started writing the book in January 2020 while spending all of his time at home during the COVID-19 pandemic, and completed it in December 2022. Initially his intention was to rewrite his 1980 short story with the same title to improve it, but the story got expanded to the 672 page novel, with the material from the short story forming its first part.

Before its publication, Shinchosha Publishing announced that the plot involves "a story that had long been sealed." The publisher also shared a teaser that includes the text: "Must go to the city. No matter what happens. A locked up 'story' starts to move quietly as if 'old dreams' are woken up and unraveled in a secluded archive."

== Publication ==
The City and Its Uncertain Walls was published in Japan on 13 April 2023. Murakami's first novel in six years, it was widely anticipated by Japanese readers who queued up at midnight on the day of its release to get a copy of the book. Selling more than half of its initial print run of 300 000 copies in the first week, Shinchosha immediately announced a second re-print.

== Plot summary ==
The protagonist is a 17-year-old boy who falls in love with a 16-year-old girl after they both win an essay writing contest. The girl keeps the boy at a distance, telling him that her real self exists in a city beyond a wall. Together they imagine the city in great detail and the boy writes everything down. One day the girl vanishes, and the boy never hears from her again. Even in his adulthood, the boy continues to long for the girl and is not able to move on.

In a parallel story, the boy is now an adult man who arrives in the city he imagined with the girl. In order to enter, he has to separate himself from his shadow. Every day the man has to go to a small library in the city and read dreams from strange orbs. As his assistant he has the 16-year-old girl who has not aged a day and does not remember ever knowing him before. As the man's shadow starts to die, he eventually decides to leave the city with his shadow. In the last moment, he changes his mind and allows the shadow to leave without him.

The man returns to his normal life, unmarried and working at a book publisher. Haunted by what he went through in the city beyond the walls and his lost love, he quits his job. He begins to dream of a library in the countryside with a beret on his desk. The man asks his friend from his earlier job to try to find him a job at a library. The protagonist ends up having a job interview at a private library in a secluded town deep in the mountains. His interviewer is Koyasu, an eccentric old man who wears a beret and is fond of wearing skirts. The main character takes over as the new boss of the library and continues to receive regular advice from Koyasu.

Eventually the man learns that Koyasu is a ghost and has died some time ago. After losing his wife and son, he turned the family's sake refinery into a library. He believes only someone like the protagonist, who has been in the city beyond the walls, can take care of the library for him. Later the protagonist befriends a teenager who always wears a Yellow Submarine hoodie. The teenager is not able to go to a normal school, but has photographic memory and comes to the library every day to memorize books.

The boy with the Yellow Submarine hoodie overhears the protagonist talking about the city beyond the walls and becomes extremely fascinated by it. The boy asks the protagonist for help to go there. One night the boy suddenly disappears. His family mounts huge searches and eventually come to suspect something supernatural has happened. Meanwhile the protagonist falls in love with an asexual divorced woman from the city running a coffee shop. He dreams that he is 17 years old again and with the girl from his youth.

Back in the city beyond the walls, the body of the protagonist (without the shadow which left) spots the boy with the Yellow Submarine hoodie arriving. The boy is not allowed to be there, but makes a deal with the protagonist to bite his ears to become one with him. As soon as the protagonist agrees, he becomes a much more successful dream reader, leaving the reading to the boy inside him. The man realizes he wants to leave the city and meet up with his shadow again. The boy happily stays behind to read dreams forever.

== Critical reception ==
The English translation of the novel received a mixed reception with critics variously describing it as "a late masterpiece", a "frustratingly literal book" and a "sorrow twilight" by an author "stuck on repeat".

Kirkus Reviews found the novel "Astonishing, puzzling, and hallucinatory as only Murakami can be, and one of his most satisfying tales", describing it as "an elegant fable that deftly weaves ordinary reality with a shadow world that is at once eerie and beautiful."

Reviewing it for the New York Times, Junot Diaz said: "In a novel obsessed with hauntings — whether it be the lost girl or the affable ghost that appears later in the novel — it is perhaps fitting that the book itself is haunted by its earlier iterations", and that he "was delighted by the novel’s uncanny shell games, by its Murakami voice, which (in contrast to the often anhedonic characters) is so ghostbustingly alive. I was moved by his portrait of impossible loss, how it can carve within us a Stygian underworld to which we are always being summoned."

In a negative review in The Guardian, Alex Preston felt that "The problem with Murakami’s dreamscapes are that they are so entirely unmoored from reality that nothing seems to matter; meaning is endlessly deferred. It feels as if his work, with its talking cats, mystical landscapes and drifting, nameless, middle-aged protagonists obsessed with their teenage years, has never moved on from a form of magical realism that was just about bearable in his short early novels. His books have not evolved – they have just got longer."
