= What I Talk About When I Talk About Running =

2007 memoir by Haruki Murakami

- First edition
- Author: Haruki Murakami
- Original title: 走ることについて語るときに僕の語ること; Hashiru Koto ni Tsuite Kataru Toki ni Boku no Kataru Koto
- Translator: Philip Gabriel
- Language: Japanese
- Genre: Memoir
- Published: 2007 (JP); 2008 (Knopf) (US)
- Publication place: Japan
- Media type: Print (Hardcover)
- Pages: 175 (US Hardcover)
- ISBN: 0-307-26919-1
- OCLC: 226314473

What I Talk About When I Talk About Running (走ることについて語るときに僕の語ること, Hashiru Koto ni Tsuite Kataru Toki ni Boku no Kataru Koto) is a memoir by Haruki Murakami in which he writes about his interest and participation in long-distance running. The book is translated into English by Philip Gabriel. Murakami started running in the early 1980s and since then has competed in over twenty marathons and an ultramarathon.

The book's title was inspired by Raymond Carver's collection of short stories What We Talk About When We Talk About Love.

== Content ==
Murakami writes "For me, running is both exercise and a metaphor." Throughout the book, he writes of how running informs his creative life.

He recalls his inspiration to become a novelist, which occurred while watching a baseball game: "The crack of bat meeting ball right on the sweet spot echoed through the stadium. Hilton easily rounded first and pulled up to second. And it was at that exact moment that a thought struck me: You know what? I could try writing a novel. I still can remember the wide open sky, the feel of the new grass, the satisfying crack of the bat. Something flew down from the sky at that instant, and, whatever it was, I accepted it." Before that, he had owned a jazz club, which he sold after his first two novels were published. "Most people I knew were flat out against my decision, or else had grave doubts about it. 'Your business is doing fine now' they said. 'Why not just let someone else run it for a time while you go and write your novels?' From the world's viewpoint this makes perfect sense. And most people probably didn't think I'd make it as a professional writer. But I couldn't follow their advice. I'm the kind of person who has to totally commit to whatever I do." After that, he started running long distances to stay healthy. He found success with the novels A Wild Sheep Chase and Norwegian Wood.

Much of the book describes his training for the New York City Marathon; he describes running from Athens to Marathon, Greece, an ultramarathon in Hokkaido and a triathlon in Murakami, Niigata Prefecture. He writes of translating F. Scott Fitzgerald's The Great Gatsby and the complete works of Raymond Carver into Japanese. He writes that "Most of what I know about writing I've learned through running every day."

== Reception ==
=== Reviews ===
- Review from The New York Times
- Review from The New York Sun
- Review from The Los Angeles Times
- Review from The Times
- Review from The Christian Science Monitor
- Review from The Daily Telegraph
- Review from The Daily Telegraph
- Review from the Stanford Social Innovation Review
