= Haruki Murakami =

Japanese writer (born 1949)

Haruki Murakami 村上 春樹
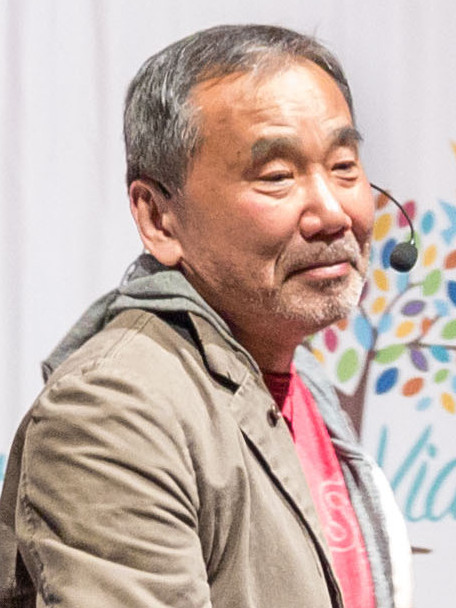
- Murakami in 2018
- Born: January 12, 1949 (age 77); Fushimi-ku, Kyoto, Japan
- Education: Waseda University (BA)
- Occupations: Novelist; short-story writer; essayist; translator
- Writing career
- Language: Japanese
- Period: Contemporary
- Genres: Fiction; Bildungsroman; picaresque
- Notable works: Norwegian Wood (1987); The Wind-Up Bird Chronicle (1994–95); Kafka on the Shore (2002); 1Q84 (2010)
- Movements: Surrealism; magical realism; postmodernism; realism
- Website: harukimurakami.com

Haruki Murakami (村上 春樹, Murakami Haruki; born January 12 1949) is a Japanese writer. His novels, essays, and short stories have been best-sellers in Japan and internationally, with his work translated into 50 languages and having sold millions of copies outside Japan. He received numerous awards for his work, including the Gunzo Prize for New Writers, the World Fantasy Award, the Tanizaki Prize, Yomiuri Prize for Literature, the Frank O'Connor International Short Story Award, the Noma Literary Prize, the Franz Kafka Prize, the Kiriyama Prize for Fiction, the Goodreads Choice Awards for Best Fiction, the Jerusalem Prize, and the Princess of Asturias Awards.

Growing up in Ashiya, near Kobe, before moving to Tokyo to attend Waseda University, he published his first novel Hear the Wind Sing (1979) after owning a small jazz bar for seven years. His notable works include the novels Norwegian Wood (1987), The Wind-Up Bird Chronicle (1994–95), Kafka on the Shore (2002) and 1Q84 (2009–10); the last was ranked as the best work of Japan's Heisei era (1989–2019) by the national newspaper Asahi Shimbun's survey of literary experts. His work spans genres including science fiction, fantasy, and crime fiction, and has become known for his use of magical realist elements.

His official website cites Raymond Chandler, Kurt Vonnegut, and Richard Brautigan as key inspirations to his work, while Murakami himself has named Kazuo Ishiguro, Cormac McCarthy, and Dag Solstad as his favorite contemporary writers. Murakami has also published five short story collections, including First Person Singular (2020), and non-fiction works including Underground (1997), an oral history of the Tokyo subway sarin attack, and What I Talk About When I Talk About Running (2007), a memoir about his experience as a long-distance runner.

His fiction has polarized literary critics and the reading public. He has sometimes been characterized by Japan's literary establishment as un-Japanese, leading to Murakami's recalling that he was a "black sheep in the Japanese literary world". Meanwhile, Murakami was described by Gary Fisketjon, the editor of Murakami's collection The Elephant Vanishes (1993), as a "truly extraordinary writer", while Steven Poole of The Guardian praised Murakami as "among the world's greatest living novelists" for his oeuvre.

== Biography ==
Murakami was born in Kyoto, Japan (then under the Allied occupation), during the post–World War II baby boom and was raised in Nishinomiya, Ashiya and Kobe. He is an only child. His father was the son of a Buddhist priest, and his mother is the daughter of an Osaka merchant. Both taught Japanese literature. His father was involved in the Second Sino-Japanese War, and was deeply traumatized by it, which would, in turn, affect Murakami.

Murakami was heavily influenced in childhood by Western culture, particularly Russian music and literature. He grew up reading a wide range of works by European and American writers, such as Franz Kafka, Gustave Flaubert, Charles Dickens, Kurt Vonnegut, Fyodor Dostoyevsky, Richard Brautigan and Jack Kerouac. These Western influences distinguish Murakami from the majority of other Japanese writers.

Murakami studied drama at Waseda University in Tokyo. His first job was at a record store. Shortly before finishing his studies, he opened a coffee house and jazz bar, Peter Cat, in Kokubunji, Tokyo, which he managed from 1974 to 1981.

Murakami met Yōko Takahashi in Tokyo and they married straight out of university. She ran the jazz bar with Murakami in Tokyo, having more business experience than he did when it first opened. The couple decided not to have children.

Murakami is an experienced marathon runner and triathlon enthusiast, though he did not start running until he was 33 years old, as a way to stay healthy. On June 23, 1996, he completed his first ultramarathon, a 100 km race around Lake Saroma in Hokkaido. He discussed running and its effect on his creative life in a 2007 memoir, What I Talk About When I Talk About Running.

== Writing career ==
=== Trilogy of the Rat ===
Murakami began to write fiction when he was 29. "Before that," he said, "I didn't write anything. I was just one of those ordinary people. I was running a jazz club, and I didn't create anything at all." He was inspired to write his first novel, Hear the Wind Sing (1979), while watching a baseball game. He described the moment he realized he could write as a "warm sensation" he could still feel in his heart. He went home and began writing that night. Murakami worked on Hear the Wind Sing for ten months in very brief stretches, during nights, after working days at the bar. He completed the novel and sent it to the only literary contest that would accept a work of that length, winning first prize.

Murakami's initial success with Hear the Wind Sing encouraged him to continue writing. A year later, he published a sequel, Pinball, 1973. In 1981, he co-wrote a short story collection, Yume de Aimashou with Shigesato Itoi. In 1982, he published A Wild Sheep Chase, a critical success. Hear the Wind Sing, Pinball, 1973, and A Wild Sheep Chase form the Trilogy of the Rat (a sequel, Dance, Dance, Dance, was written later but is not considered part of the series), centered on the same unnamed narrator and his friend, "the Rat".

The first two novels were not widely available in English translation outside Japan until 2015, although an English edition, translated by Alfred Birnbaum with extensive notes, had been published by Kodansha as part of a series intended for Japanese students of English. Murakami considers his first two novels to be "immature" and "flimsy", and has not been eager to have them translated into English. A Wild Sheep Chase, he says, was "the first book where I could feel a kind of sensation, the joy of telling a story. When you read a good story, you just keep reading. When I write a good story, I just keep writing."

=== Wider recognition ===
In 1985, Murakami wrote Hard-Boiled Wonderland and the End of the World, a dream-like fantasy that took the magical elements of his work to a new extreme. Murakami achieved a major breakthrough and national recognition in 1987 with the publication of Norwegian Wood, a nostalgic story of loss and sexuality. It sold millions of copies among young Japanese.

Norwegian Wood propelled the barely known Murakami into the spotlight. He was mobbed at airports and other public places, leading to his departure from Japan in 1986. Murakami traveled through Europe, lived in the United States and currently resides in Oiso, Kanagawa, with an office in Tokyo.

Murakami was a writing fellow at Princeton University in Princeton, New Jersey, Tufts University in Medford, Massachusetts, and Harvard University in Cambridge, Massachusetts. During this time he wrote South of the Border, West of the Sun and The Wind-Up Bird Chronicle.

=== From "detachment" to "commitment" ===
The Wind-Up Bird Chronicle (1995) fuses the realistic and fantastic and contains elements of physical violence. It is also more socially conscious than his previous work, dealing in part with the difficult topic of war crimes in Manchukuo (Northeast China). The novel won the Yomiuri Prize, awarded by a committee chaired by one of Murakami's harshest former critics, Kenzaburō Ōe, who himself won the Nobel Prize for Literature in 1994.

The processing of collective trauma soon became an important theme in Murakami's writing, which had previously been more personal in nature. Murakami returned to Japan in the aftermath of the Kobe earthquake and the Aum Shinrikyo gas attack. He came to terms with these events with his first work of non-fiction, Underground, and the short story collection after the quake. Underground consists largely of interviews of victims of the gas attacks in the Tokyo subway system.

In 1996, in a conversation with the psychologist Hayao Kawai, Murakami explained that he changed his position from one of "detachment" to one of "commitment" after staying in the United States in the 1990s. He called The Wind-up Bird Chronicle a turning point in his career, marking this change in focus.

English translations of many of his short stories written between 1983 and 1990 have been collected in The Elephant Vanishes. Murakami has also translated many works of F. Scott Fitzgerald, Raymond Carver, Truman Capote, John Irving, and Paul Theroux, among others, into Japanese.

Murakami took an active role in translation of his work into English, encouraging "adaptations" of his texts to American reality rather than direct translation. Some of his works that appeared in German turned out to be translations from English rather than Japanese (South of the Border, West of the Sun, 2000; The Wind-Up Bird Chronicle, 2000s), encouraged by Murakami himself. Both were later re-translated from Japanese.

=== Since 1999 ===
Sputnik Sweetheart was first published in 1999, followed by Kafka on the Shore in 2002, with the English translation following in 2005. Kafka on the Shore won the World Fantasy Award in 2006. The English version of his novel After Dark was released in May 2007. It was chosen by The New York Times as a "notable book of the year".

In late 2005, Murakami published a collection of short stories titled Tōkyō Kitanshū, or 東京奇譚集, which translates loosely as "Mysteries of Tokyo". A collection of the English versions of twenty-four short stories, titled Blind Willow, Sleeping Woman, was published in August 2006. This collection includes both older works from the 1980s as well as some of Murakami's more recent short stories, including all five that appear in Tōkyō Kitanshū.

In 2002, Murakami published the anthology Birthday Stories, which collects short stories on the theme of birthdays. It includes work by Russell Banks, Ethan Canin, Raymond Carver, David Foster Wallace, Denis Johnson, Claire Keegan, Andrea Lee, Daniel Lyons, Lynda Sexson, Paul Theroux, and William Trevor, as well as a story by Murakami himself. What I Talk About When I Talk About Running, a memoir about his experience as a marathon runner and a triathlete, was published in Japan in 2007, with English translations released in the UK and the US in 2008. The title is a play on that of Raymond Carver's short story collection What We Talk About When We Talk About Love.

In 2004, Murakami was interviewed by John Wray for the 182nd installment of The Paris Review's "The Art of Fiction" interview series. Recorded over the course of two afternoons, the interview addressed the change in tone and style of his more recent works at the time—such as after the quake—his myriad of Western influences ranging from Fyodor Dostoevsky to John Irving, and his collaborative process with the many translators he has worked with over the course of his career.

Shinchosha Publishing published Murakami's novel 1Q84 in Japan on May 29, 2009. 1Q84 is pronounced "ichi kyū hachi yon", the same as 1984, as 9 is also pronounced "kyū" in Japanese. The book was longlisted for the Man Asian Literary Prize in 2011. However, after the 2012 anti-Japanese demonstrations in China, Murakami's books were removed from sale there, along with those of other Japanese authors. Murakami criticized the China–Japan political territorial dispute, characterizing the overwrought nationalistic response as "cheap liquor" which politicians were giving to the public. In April 2013, he published his novel Colorless Tsukuru Tazaki and His Years of Pilgrimage. It became an international bestseller but received mixed reviews.

In 2015, Switch Publishing published Murakami's essay collection Novelist as a Vocation in Japan, featuring insights and commentaries on Murakami's life and career. The essay collection was later translated into English by Philip Gabriel and Ted Goossen and released by Alfred A. Knopf on November 8, 2022.

Killing Commendatore (Kishidanchō-goroshi) was published in Japan on February 24, 2017, and in the US in October 2018. The novel is about an unnamed portrait painter who stumbles upon an unknown painting, titled Killing Commendatore, after assuming residence in its creator's former abode. Since its publication, the novel has caused controversy in Hong Kong and was labeled under "Class II – indecent" in Hong Kong. This classification led to mass amounts of censorship. The publisher must not distribute the book to people under the age of 18, and must have a warning label printed on the cover.

Murakami's most recent novel The City and Its Uncertain Walls was published by Shinchosha in Japan on April 13, 2023. His first novel in six years, it is 1,200-pages long and is set in a "soul-stirring, 100% pure Murakami world" that involves "a story that had long been sealed". In promoting his latest book, Murakami stated that he believed that the pandemic and the ongoing Russian invasion of Ukraine have created walls that divide people, fueling fear and skepticism instead of mutual trust.

The novel is based on a 1980 novella written by Murakami, which he says he was never satisfied with. In an interview with The Guardian, Murakami states, "The situation of the town surrounded by walls was also a metaphor of the worldwide lockdown. How is it possible for both extreme isolation and warm feelings of empathy to coexist?"

In July 2024, The New Yorker published Murakami's short story "Kaho", in which a man goes on a blind date with a woman named Kaho and ends it with an insult, which is also the first line of the story.

In April 2026, it was announced that a novel featuring a female protagonist would be published in July. The novel is called The Tale of Kaho. This will be Murakami's first novel with a single female protagonist.

== Writing style ==
Most of Haruki Murakami's works use first-person narrative in the tradition of the Japanese I-novel. He states that because family plays a significant role in traditional Japanese literature, any main character who is independent becomes a man who values freedom and solitude over intimacy. Also notable is Murakami's unique humor, as seen in his 2000 short story collection After the Quake. In the story "Superfrog Saves Tokyo", the protagonist is confronted with a six-foot-tall frog that talks about the destruction of Tokyo over a cup of tea. In spite of the story's sober tone, Murakami feels the reader should be entertained once the seriousness of a subject has been broached.

Another notable feature of Murakami's stories are the comments that come from the main characters as to how strange the story presents itself. Murakami explains that his characters experience what he experiences as he writes, which could be compared to a movie set where the walls and props are all fake. He has further compared the process of writing to movies: "That is one of the joys of writing fiction—I'm making my own film made just for myself."

Murakami's writing is often described as magical realism with surreal elements. His novels are described as being acted experiences rather than linear stories, with characters doing things without reasoning or explanation. Murakami himself however does not consider his writing to be surrealistic or magical realism: "I simply write the stories that I want to write, and in a style that suits me. When I write fiction, the story sort of moves on ahead naturally, like flowing water following the lay of the land. All I'm doing is putting this flow into words, as faithfully as I can."

Many of his novels have themes and titles that evoke classical music, such as the three books making up The Wind-Up Bird Chronicle: The Thieving Magpie (after Rossini's opera), Bird as Prophet (after a piano piece by Robert Schumann usually known in English as The Prophet Bird), and The Bird-Catcher (Papageno, a character in Mozart's opera The Magic Flute). Some of his novels take their titles from songs: Dance, Dance, Dance (after The Dells' 1957 B-side song, although it is often thought it was titled after the Beach Boys' 1964 tune), Norwegian Wood (after The Beatles' song) and South of the Border, West of the Sun (after the song "South of the Border").

Some analyses see aspects of shamanism in his writing. In a 2000 article, Susan Fisher connected Shinto or Japanese shamanism with some elements of The Wind-Up Bird Chronicle, such as a descent into a dry well. At an October 2013 symposium held at the University of Hawaiʻi, associate professor of Japanese Nobuko Ochner opined "there were many descriptions of traveling in a parallel world as well as characters who have some connection to shamanism" in Murakami's works.

In an October 2022 article for The Atlantic, Murakami clarified that nearly none of the characters in his work has been created based on individuals in real life, as many people alleged. He wrote: "I almost never decide in advance that I'll present a particular type of character. As I write, a kind of axis forms that makes possible the appearance of certain characters, and I go ahead and fit one detail after another into place, like iron scraps attaching to a magnet. And in this way an overall picture of a person materializes. Afterward I often think that certain details resemble those of a real person, but most of the process happens automatically. I think I almost unconsciously pull information and various fragments from the cabinets in my brain and then weave them together." Murakami named this process "the Automatic Dwarfs." He continued: "One of the things I most enjoy about writing novels is the sense that I can become anybody I want to be," noting that "Characters who are—in a literary sense—alive will eventually break free of the writer's control and begin to act independently."

== Recognition ==
=== Prizes for books ===
- 1979: Gunzo Prize for New Writers for Hear the Wind Sing
- 1982: Noma Literary Prize (best newcomer) for A Wild Sheep Chase
- 1985: Tanizaki Prize for Hard-Boiled Wonderland and the End of the World
- 1995: Yomiuri Prize (best novel) for The Wind-Up Bird Chronicle
- 1999: Kuwabara Takeo Prize for Underground
- 2006: World Fantasy Award (best novel) for Kafka on the Shore
- 2006: Frank O'Connor International Short Story Award for Blind Willow, Sleeping Woman
- 2007: Xatafi-Cyberdark for Kafka on the Shore
- 2012: Premio Ignotus for 1Q84
- 2016: Hans Christian Andersen Literature Award
- 2018: America Award in Literature for a lifetime contribution to international writing
- 2022: Prix mondial Cinco Del Duca for a lifetime of work constituting, in a literary form, a message of modern humanism
- 2023: Premio Princesa de Asturias de las Letras.

Murakami was also awarded the 2007 Kiriyama Prize for Fiction for his collection of short stories Blind Willow, Sleeping Woman, but according to the prize's official website, Murakami "declined to accept the award for reasons of personal principle".

=== Personal prizes ===
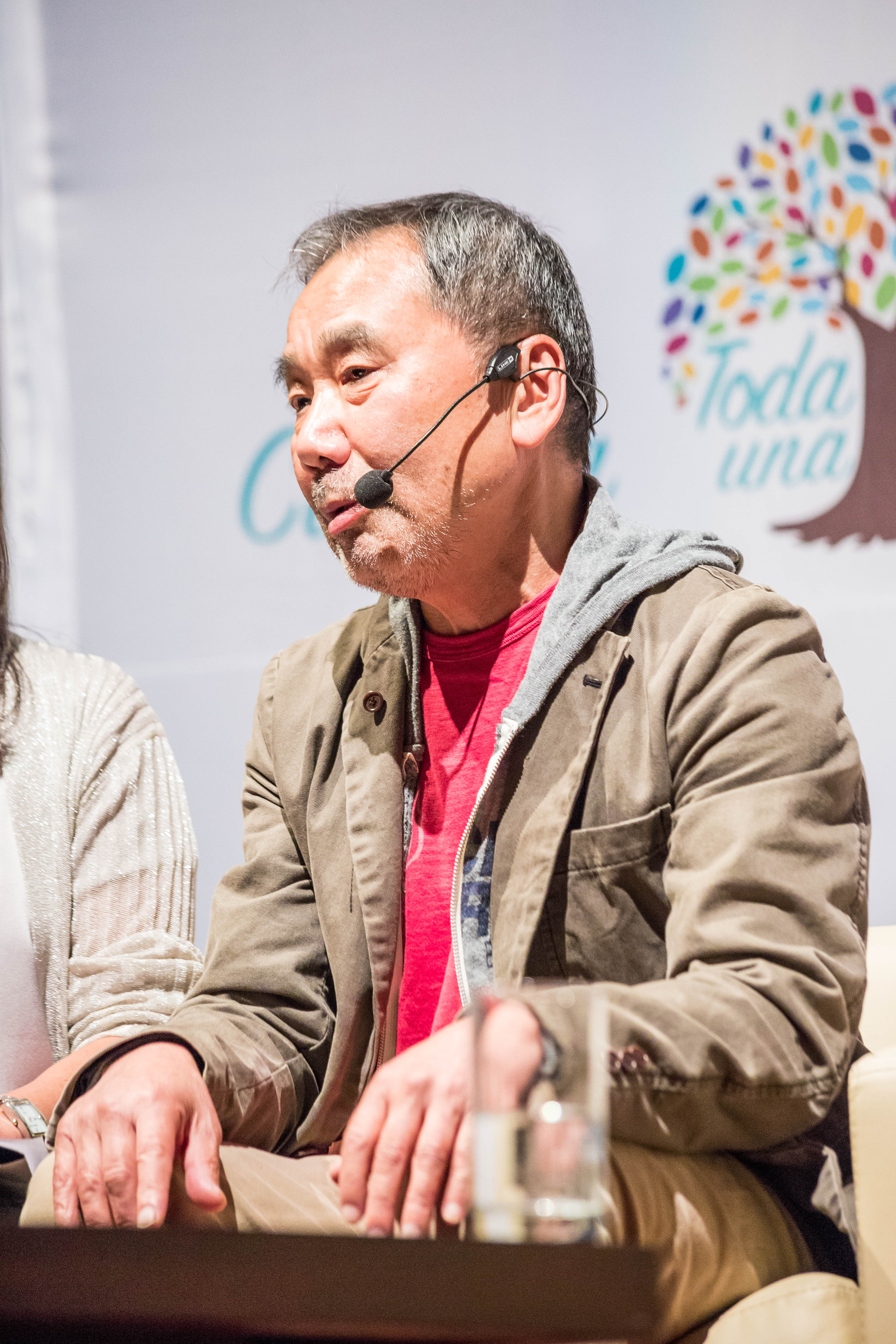
Murakami in 2018

In 2006, Murakami became the sixth recipient of the Franz Kafka Prize.

In January 2009, Murakami received the Jerusalem Prize, a biennial literary award given to writers whose work deals with themes of human freedom, society, politics, and government. There were protests in Japan and elsewhere against his attending the February award ceremony in Israel, including threats to boycott his work as a response against Israel's recent bombing of Gaza. Murakami chose to attend the ceremony, but gave a speech to the gathered Israeli dignitaries harshly criticizing Israeli policies. Murakami said, "Each of us possesses a tangible living soul. The system has no such thing. We must not allow the system to exploit us." The same year he was named Knight of the Order of Arts and Letters of Spain.

In 2011, Murakami donated his €80,000 winnings from the International Catalunya Prize (from the Generalitat de Catalunya) to the victims of the 2011 Tōhoku earthquake and tsunami and resulting Fukushima nuclear disaster. In his speech when he accepted the award, he criticized nuclear power.

In recent years, Haruki Murakami has often been mentioned as a possible recipient of the Nobel Prize in Literature. Nonetheless, since all nomination records are sealed for 50 years from the awarding of the prize, it is pure speculation. When asked about the possibility of being awarded the Nobel Prize, Murakami responded with a laugh saying "No, I don't want prizes. That means you're finished."

In October 2014, he was awarded the Welt-Literaturpreis.

In April 2015, Murakami was named one of the Time 100 most influential people. In November 2016, he was awarded the Danish Hans Christian Andersen Literature Award, an award previously won by British author J. K. Rowling.

In 2018, he was nominated for the New Academy Prize in Literature. He requested that his nomination be withdrawn, saying he wanted to "concentrate on writing, away from media attention."

In 2023, he was awarded the Princess of Asturias Award for Literature.

In 2024, Murakami received the Golden Plate Award of the American Academy of Achievement and was elected as a Royal Society of Literature International Writer. He received the Lifetime of Excellence in Fiction Award in 2025.

=== Honorary degrees ===
Murakami has received honorary degrees (Doctor of Letters) from the University of Liège (September 2007), Princeton University (June 2008), Tufts University (May 2014), Yale University (May 2016), and University of Nova Gorica (2021), and University of Iceland (May 2025).

== Archives ==
In 2018, Waseda University in Tokyo agreed to house the archives of Haruki Murakami, including his manuscripts, source documents, and music collection. Later in September 2021, architect Kengo Kuma announced the opening of the Waseda International House of Literature, a library dedicated entirely to Murakami's works at Waseda University, which would include more than 3,000 works by Murakami, including translations into more than 50 other languages.

The library, officially known as the Waseda International House of Literature or the Haruki Murakami Library, opened on October 1, 2021. In addition to its vast collection of written material, the library also hosts a coffee shop run by Waseda University students—called Orange Cat, after Murakami's Peter Cat jazz bar from his twenties—in addition to a listening lounge where visitors can listen to records collected by Murakami himself.

== Films and other adaptations ==
Murakami's first novel, Hear the Wind Sing (Kaze no uta o kike), was adapted by Japanese director Kazuki Ōmori. The film was released in 1981 and distributed by Art Theatre Guild. Naoto Yamakawa directed two short films, Attack on the Bakery (released in 1982) and A Girl, She is 100 Percent (released in 1983), based on Murakami's short stories "Bakery Attack" and "On Seeing the 100% Perfect Girl One Beautiful April Morning", respectively. Japanese director Jun Ichikawa adapted Murakami's short story "Tony Takitani" into a 75-minute feature. The film played at various film festivals and was released in New York and Los Angeles on July 29, 2005.

The original short story, translated into English by Jay Rubin, is available in the April 15, 2002, issue of The New Yorker, as a stand-alone book published by Cloverfield Press, and part of Blind Willow, Sleeping Woman by Knopf. In 1998, the German film The Polar Bear (German: Der Eisbär), written and directed by Granz Henman, used elements of Murakami's short story "The Second Bakery Attack" in three intersecting story lines. "The Second Bakery Attack" was also adapted as a short film in 2010, directed by Carlos Cuarón, starring Kirsten Dunst and as part of a segment in the South Korean omnibus film Acoustic.

Murakami's work was also adapted for the stage in a 2003 play entitled The Elephant Vanishes, co-produced by Britain's Complicité company and Japan's Setagaya Public Theatre. The production, directed by Simon McBurney, adapted three of Murakami's short stories and received acclaim for its unique blending of multimedia (video, music, and innovative sound design) with actor-driven physical theater (mime, dance, and even acrobatic wire work). On tour, the play was performed in Japanese, with supertitle translations for European and American audiences.

Two stories from Murakami's book after the quake – "Honey Pie" and "Superfrog Saves Tokyo" – have been adapted for the stage and directed by Frank Galati. Entitled after the quake, the play was first performed at the Steppenwolf Theatre Company in association with La Jolla Playhouse, and opened on October 12, 2007, at Berkeley Repertory Theatre. In 2008, Galati also adapted and directed a theatrical version of Kafka on the Shore, which first ran at Chicago's Steppenwolf Theatre Company from September to November.

On Max Richter's 2006 album Songs from Before, Robert Wyatt reads passages from Murakami's novels. In 2007, Robert Logevall adapted "All God's Children Can Dance" into a film, with a soundtrack composed by American jam band Sound Tribe Sector 9. In 2008, Tom Flint adapted "On Seeing the 100% Perfect Girl One Beautiful April Morning" into a short film. The film was screened at the 2008 CON-CAN Movie Festival. The film was viewed, voted, and commented upon as part of the audience award for the movie festival.

It was announced in July 2008 that French-Vietnamese director Tran Anh Hung would direct an adaptation of Murakami's novel Norwegian Wood. The film was released in Japan on December 11, 2010.

In 2010, Stephen Earnhart adapted The Wind-Up Bird Chronicle into a two-hour multimedia stage presentation. The show opened January 12, 2010, as part of the Public Theater's "Under the Radar" festival at the Ohio Theater in New York City, presented in association with The Asia Society and the Baryshnikov Arts Center. The show had its world premiere at the Edinburgh International Festival on August 21, 2011. The presentation incorporates live actors, video projection, traditional Japanese puppetry, and immersive soundscapes to render the surreal landscape of the original work.

In 2013, pianist Eunbi Kim debuted a performance piece, titled "Murakami Music: Stories of Loss and Nostalgia", drawn from excerpts of Murakami's work as part of her artist residency at The Cell Theatre in New York City. Excerpts included Reiko's monologue from Norwegian Wood (novel), as well as the self-titled song of Kafka on the Shore. The performance piece was acted by Laura Yumi Snell and directed by Kira Simring. From 2013 to 2014, Kim and Snell performed across the United States, notably with a premiere at Symphony Space and a showing at Georgetown University.

Memoranda, a 2017 adventure video game, is based on various short stories from After the Quake, Blind Willow, Sleeping Woman, and The Elephant Vanishes, and features several Murakami characters, with Mizuki Ando as the protagonist.

In 2018, "Barn Burning" from Murakami's short story collection The Elephant Vanishes was adapted into a film titled Burning by director Lee Chang-dong. The film was awarded the FIPRESCI International Critics’ Prize for best film, receiving the highest score to date. It was also South Korea's submission for the Academy Award for Best International Feature Film in 2019.

A film based on the short story "Drive My Car" premiered at the 2021 Cannes Film Festival, where it won Best Screenplay, the FIPRESCI Prize, and the Prize of the Ecumenical Jury. The film went on to win the Academy Award for Best International Feature and received three other nominations: Best Picture, Best Director, and Best Adapted Screenplay. Directed by Ryusuke Hamaguchi, it also takes inspiration from Chekhov's play Uncle Vanya as well as "Scheherazade" and "Kino," two other stories in the collection Men Without Women.

In 2022, director Pierre Földes adapted six short stories from Murakami's books After the Quake, Blind Willow, Sleeping Woman and The Elephant Vanishes into an animated feature film. The film, titled Blind Willow, Sleeping Woman, is an international co-production of Canada, France, Luxembourg and the Netherlands. The film premiered in the feature film competition at the 2022 Annecy International Animation Film Festival, where it was awarded a Jury Distinction.

In 2022, Confessions of a Shinagawa Monkey was translated into Yorùbá by Nigerian linguist Kola Tubosun, making it the first time a Murakami story would be translated into an African language.

From 2023 to 2025, Jean-Christophe Deveney adapted nine of Murakami's short stories into Haruki Murakami Manga Stories, a three-volume original English-language manga series illustrated by PGML and published by Tuttle Publishing. The nine stories adapted are Super-Frog Saves Tokyo, The Seventh Man, Birthday Girl, Where I'm Likely to Find It, The Second Bakery Attack, Samsa in Love, Thailand, Scheherezade, and Sleep.

== Personal life ==
After receiving the Gunzo Award for his 1979 literary work Hear the Wind Sing, Murakami did not aspire to meet other writers. Aside from Sarah Lawrence's Mary Morris, whom he briefly mentions in his memoir What I Talk About When I Talk About Running alongside Joyce Carol Oates and Toni Morrison, Murakami was never a part of a community of writers, his reason being that he was a loner and was never fond of groups, schools, and literary circles.

When working on a book, Murakami states that he relies on his wife, who is always his first reader. While he never acquainted himself with many writers, among contemporary writers he enjoys the work of Kazuo Ishiguro, Cormac McCarthy, Lee Child and Dag Solstad. While he does not read much contemporary Japanese literature, Murakami enjoys the works of Ryū Murakami and Banana Yoshimoto.

Murakami enjoys baseball and describes himself as a fan of the Tokyo Yakult Swallows. In his 2015 essay for Literary Hub "The Moment I Became a Novelist", Murakami describes how attending a Swallow's game in Jingu Stadium in 1978 led to a personal epiphany in which he decided to write his first novel.

Haruki Murakami is a fan of crime novels. During his high school days while living in Kōbe, he would buy paperbacks from second-hand bookstores and learned to read English. The first book that he read in English was The Name is Archer, written by Ross Macdonald in 1955. Other writers he was interested in included Leo Tolstoy and Fyodor Dostoyevsky.

Murakami also has a passion for listening to music, especially classical and jazz. "He credits his love of music ... for shaping his writing even more than the books he's read". When he was around 15, he began to develop an interest in jazz after attending an Art Blakey and the Jazz Messengers concert in Kobe. He later opened the Peter Cat, a coffeehouse and jazz bar. Murakami has said that music, like writing, is a mental journey. At one time he aspired to be a musician, but because he could not play instruments well he decided to become a writer instead.

In an interview with The Guardian, Murakami stated his belief that his surreal books appeal to people especially in times of turmoil and political chaos. He stated that "I was so popular in the 1990s in Russia, at the time they were changing from the Soviet Union – there was big confusion, and people in confusion like my books" and "In Germany, when the Berlin Wall fell down, there was confusion – and people liked my books."

== Political views ==
Murakami told The New York Times Magazine in 2011, "I think of myself as a political person, but I don't state my political messages to anybody." Comparing himself to George Orwell, he views himself as standing "against the system." In 2009, whilst accepting an award in Israel, he expressed his political views as:

If there is a hard, high wall and an egg that breaks against it, no matter how right the wall or how wrong the egg, I will stand on the side of the egg. Why? Because each of us is an egg, a unique soul enclosed in a fragile egg. Each of us is confronting a high wall. The high wall is the system which forces us to do the things we would not ordinarily see fit to do as individuals.

Murakami stated that it is natural for China and the Koreas to continue to feel resentment towards Japan for its wartime aggressions. "Fundamentally, Japanese people tend not to have an idea that they were also assailants, and the tendency is getting clearer," he said. In another interview, Murakami stated: "The issue of historical understanding carries great significance, and I believe it is important that Japan makes straightforward apologies. I think that is all Japan can do – apologise until the countries say: 'We don't necessarily get over it completely, but you have apologised enough. Alright, let's leave it now.'"

In January 2015, Murakami expressed support for same-sex marriage, which is not recognised in Japan, when responding to a reader's question about his stance on the issue.

In August 2021, during one of his radio shows, Murakami criticized prime minister Yoshihide Suga over the handling of the COVID-19 pandemic in Japan, suggesting Suga had ignored a surge in Covid cases and public concerns about the state of the pandemic. Murakami quoted Suga as saying "an exit is now in our sight after a long tunnel" and added, in criticism, that "If he really saw an exit, his eyes must be extremely good for his age. I'm of the same age as Mr. Suga, but I don't see any exit at all."

In 2022, during the Russian invasion of Ukraine, Murakami prepared a special radio program calling for peace which featured around ten musical pieces that encouraged an end to the war and a "focus on the preciousness of life".

== Bibliography ==
Novels

- 1979: Hear the Wind Sing
- 1980: Pinball, 1973
- 1982: A Wild Sheep Chase
- 1985: Hard-Boiled Wonderland and the End of the World
- 1987: Norwegian Wood
- 1988: Dance Dance Dance
- 1992: South of the Border, West of the Sun
- 1994–1995: The Wind-Up Bird Chronicle
- 1999: Sputnik Sweetheart
- 2002: Kafka on the Shore
- 2004: After Dark
- 2009–2010: 1Q84
- 2013: Colorless Tsukuru Tazaki and His Years of Pilgrimage
- 2017: Killing Commendatore
- 2023: The City and Its Uncertain Walls
- 2026: The Tale of Kaho

Short story collections

- 1981: Let's Meet in a Dream
- 1993: The Elephant Vanishes
- 2000: after the quake
- 2006: Blind Willow, Sleeping Woman
- 2014: Men Without Women
- 2020: First Person Singular

== In popular culture ==
By 2008, there were three non-fiction scholarly books in English about Murakami and his works. Timothy J. Van Compernolle of Amherst College wrote that the fact that many such books existed about "a living author in the relatively small field of Japanese literary studies in the English-speaking world is unprecedented."

== See also ==
- Japanese literature
- Surrealism
- Weird fiction
