= Killing Commendatore =

2017 novel by Haruki Murakami

- Cover of volume one; first edition (Japan)
- Author: Haruki Murakami
- Audio read by: Kirby Heyborne
- Original title: Vol. 1: 騎士団長殺し :第1部 顕れるイデア編 (Kishidanchō-goroshi: Dai-ichi-bu, Arawareru idea hen); Vol. 2: 騎士団長殺し :第2部 遷ろうメタファー編 (Kishidanchō-goroshi: Dai-ni-bu, Utsurou metafā hen)
- Translator: Philip Gabriel; Ted Goossen
- Cover artist: Chihiro Takahashi
- Language: Japanese
- Genre: Historical fiction
- Set in: Japan
- Publisher: Shinchosha
- Publication date: 24 February 2017
- Publication place: Japan
- English publication date: 9 October 2018
- Media type: Print (Hardcover)
- Pages: 512 (Vol. 1); 544 (Vol. 2)
- ISBN: 978-4-10-353432-7 (Vol. 1); 978-4-10-353433-4 (Vol. 2)
- Dewey Decimal: 895.63/5
- LC Class: PL856.U673 K5713 2018

Killing Commendatore (Japanese: 騎士団長殺し, Hepburn: Kishidanchō-goroshi) is a 2017 novel written by Japanese writer Haruki Murakami. It was first published in two volumes–The Idea Made Visible (顕れるイデア編, Arawareru idea hen) and The Shifting Metaphor (遷ろうメタファー編, Utsurou metafā hen), respectively–by Shinchosha in Japan on 24 February 2017. An English translation by Philip Gabriel and Ted Goossen was released as a single, 704-page volume on 9 October 2018 by Alfred A. Knopf in the US and by Harvill Secker in the UK.

The publisher of the book stated that 1.3 million copies were planned for the first-edition Japanese prints.

== Plot ==
The protagonist is an unnamed portrait painter whose wife leaves him at the start of the book. Devastated, he quits portrait painting and goes on a long road trip. In the middle of his road trip he meets a nervous woman in a diner who seems to be running away from someone. The protagonist suspects that she is running away from a man who sits nearby while they eat. The protagonist nicknames this man as the man with the white Subaru Forester. The woman and the protagonist end up going to a love hotel and having violent sex. The next day, he wakes up and she is already gone. He goes back to the diner and sees the man with the white Subaru again and he feels as though the man knows exactly what he did with the nervous woman at the love hotel.

The protagonist's road trip comes to an end when his car breaks down. He then moves into the remote house of his friend's father, Tomohiko Amada, a renowned painter who has been moved to a nursing home. There in the attic he discovers an owl living in it and an unknown painting by Tomohiko, Killing Commendatore, depicting a scene from the opera Don Giovanni, though he notices that certain discrepancies in the details. He starts working as an art teacher to make ends meet in the village. Meanwhile, a wealthy neighbour, Wataru Menshiki, offers him a very large sum of money to paint his portrait, which he eventually agrees to do. He ends up creating a portrait unlike anything he has done before and it inspires him to begin a portrait of the man with the white Subaru.

One night he hears a bell ringing and enlists Menshiki to help him locate the source of the sound. The sound of the bell is coming from a pile of heavy rocks behind a shrine in the woods. Menshiki hires a construction crew to remove the rocks and they uncover a man-made pit with well-constructed stone walls about nine-feet high. There is nothing in the pit except the bells which they remove. As their relationship grows, Menshiki reveals to the protagonist that he purchased his house in order to spy on a young teen, Mariye Akigawa, who he suspects is his daughter, through a former lover who died several years after Mariye's birth. Meanwhile, the source of the bell ringing - an "Idea" - reveals itself to the protagonist as a two-foot tall, apparently flesh and blood, copy of the character Commendatore from Tomohiko's painting. The Commendatore and the protagonist visit Menshiki's house to view his newly completed portrait (although Menshiki is unable to see the Commandatore). Menshiki then requests that the protagonist paint a portrait of Mariye, who is a student in the protagonist's art class, so that Menshiki will be able to “accidentally” meet her when he arranges to stop by. The protagonist begins to paint Mariye and also begins a painting of the pit. He stops work on the painting of the man with the white Subaru, feeling that the portrait is ominously demanding that he stop. He ends up placing the painting of the man with the white Subaru against the wall so that it is somewhat hidden from sight. Menshiki drops by during one of the painting sessions with Mariye, and he soon takes up a relationship with Mariye's aunt, Shoko, who has taken care of Mariye after her mother's sudden death and chaperones the painting sessions.

The protagonist researches more into Tomohiko's life and learns that Tomohiko was once a student in Austria during the Nazi takeover. Tomohiko was involved in a failed student-led assassination plot of a high-ranking Nazi officer, resulting in his lover's execution and his quiet expulsion back to Japan. The protagonist realizes that the painting imagines an alternative ending to the events in history where the plot succeeded. The protagonist also has a realistic dream in which he has sex with his sleeping wife. Meanwhile, Mariye suddenly goes missing.

Desperate to find Mariye and feeling that her disappearance is related to the pit and the painting, the protagonist asks the Commendatore to tell him Mariye's location. The Commendatore tells him that as an idea, he is restricted in what he can say. The Commendatore says that he needs to accept the next invitation he receives no matter what and that it may or may not lead to a clue regarding Mariye's whereabouts. The protagonist receives an invitation to meet Tomohiko Amada in the nursing home and accepts. The Commendatore helps him realize that the painting is an attempt by Tomohiko to address the traumatic events that occurred to him in Austria, of which he has never spoken again. The protagonist ends up re-enacting the scene from Tomohiko's painting, killing the miniature Commendatore with a fishing knife, at the Commendatore's bidding. This both mollifies Tomohiko, who slips into a coma, and causes another character from the painting—"Long Face"—to open a door to a metaphorical underworld, through which the protagonist must journey in order to rescue Mariye. Within, the protagonist is forced to confront traumas of his own past. After emerging from the underworld, he finds himself trapped in the pit for several days and Menshiki rescues him. Menshiki tells him that Mariye has reappeared during his days away.

The protagonist and Mariye meet in private and both recount what happened to them. Mariye reveals that, suspicious of Menshiki, she snuck into his home, but became trapped and unable to leave without being noticed for four days. While there, she felt a mysterious connection to women's clothes stored in one of Menshiki's closets, not realizing they belonged to her deceased mother. The protagonist and Mariye wrap Killing Commendatore and the unfinished The Man with the White Subaru Forester up and move them to the attic, out of sight. At the end of the book, he reconciles with his estranged wife, who is heavily pregnant and with whom he has not physically met in a year. Though he does not know if the child his or not, he resolves not to exist like Menshiki, with his life dictated by the uncertainty, and instead raises the child as his own. Keeping touch with Mariye as she grows up, he later learns that the house eventually burned down, along with the hidden paintings.

== Censorship ==
In Hong Kong, the book is classified by the Obscene Articles Tribunal of Hong Kong under "Class II - indecent". Under such classification, the publisher must not distribute the book to people under the age of 18, and it must be sealed with printed warnings on the front and back covers. Public libraries are not allowed to lend the book to anyone under 18. Following the classification, the book was also removed from the shelves of the Hong Kong Book Fair.

The public responded by a petition, created using Google Forms and posted on Facebook by the group "The HK House of Literature", written jointly by 24 groups. The petition declared that the decision would "bring shame to Hong Kong people" and warned that it could hurt international standing of the city's publishing and cultural sectors. On July 26, 2018, the petition received 2,100 signatures.

== Critical response ==
Kirkus Reviews called the novel "altogether bizarre—and pleasingly beguiling, if demanding" and included it in its "Best Fiction of 2018" list.

Bradley Babendir from The A.V. Club criticized the book for lacking the "particular energy" that is seen through Murakami's other impressive stories, and that his "attempt to explore the artistic process, unfortunately, lacks insight."

Xan Brooks from The Guardian noted the book's sense of meandering though respected Murakami's comfort in it: "His pace remains easy and unhurried. His prose is warm, conversational and studded with quiet profundities. He’s eminently good company; that most precious of qualities that we look for in an author. We trust him to get us entertainingly lost, just as we trust that he’ll eventually get us home."

Hari Kunzru from The New York Times felt like the story offered "promising mysteries", but there was a "sense of a writer throwing a lot of ideas against the wall in the hope that something will stick" and ultimately calling Killing Commendatore a "baggy monster" and a "disappointment from a writer who has made much better work."

Randy Rosenthal praised the book in his review for the Los Angeles Review of Books by writing, "By writing about metaphors and ideas, by ringing bells underground and animating two-foot-tall men, by having the desperate desires of others intrude on the simplest of plans and a whole lot else, Murakami is reminding us that the world is more enchanted than we might think."
