= Men Without Women (Murakami short story collection) =

2014 short story collection by Haruki Murakami

- First edition cover (Japan)
- Author: Haruki Murakami
- Audio read by: Kirby Heyborne
- Original title: 女のいない男たち (Onna no inai otokotachi)
- Translator: Philip Gabriel; Ted Goossen
- Cover artist: Shinano Hattaro
- Language: Japanese
- Genre: Short story collection
- Set in: Japan
- Publisher: Bungeishunjū
- Publication date: 18 April 2014
- Publication place: Japan
- English publication date: 9 May 2017
- Media type: Print (hardcover)
- Pages: 288
- ISBN: 978-4-16-390074-2
- Dewey Decimal: 895.63/5
- LC Class: PL856.U673 A2 2017

Men Without Women (Japanese: 女のいない男たち, Hepburn: Onna no inai otokotachi) is a 2014 collection of short stories by Japanese author Haruki Murakami; the collection was translated and published in English in 2017. The stories are about men who have lost women in their lives, usually to other men or death. The collection shares its title with Ernest Hemingway's second short story collection.

== Contents ==
Story	Originally published in (English translation)
"Drive My Car"	Freeman's
"Yesterday"	The New Yorker
"An Independent Organ"	
"Scheherazade"	The New Yorker
"Kino"	The New Yorker
"Samsa in Love"	The New Yorker
"Men Without Women"	

== Stories ==
=== "Drive My Car" ===
Kafuku, a veteran and widowed actor, hires 24-year-old driver Misaki Watari to chauffeur him around Tokyo due to his license being revoked due to a D.U.I. and glaucoma. During their trips, Kafuku occasionally tells her about his life as an actor and his late wife's extramarital affairs. One tale includes how he befriended her lover, Takatsuki, with the intention of harming him. However, over the course of their six-month friendship which was spent mostly binge drinking at local bars, he was never able to find any damning information and instead sympathizes with Takatsuki's observations. He also never learns of his wife's motives, calling it a "blind spot" in his knowledge of her. After hearing his story, Misaki notes that perhaps his wife having affairs had had nothing to do with love and that was a good enough reason to do so. After contemplating this propositions, he falls asleep as she continues driving.

=== "Yesterday" ===
Tanimura remembers a time in his early twenties when he worked in a restaurant with his friend Kitaru. Kitaru has a few idiosyncrasies that cause his girlfriend Erika to feel uneasy about their relationship: he speaks in a Kansai dialect despite having lived all his life in Tokyo, does not want to study hard despite having university aspirations, and seems to be asexual around her. One day, Kitaru proposes that Tanimura go on a "date" with Erika, to which Tanimura reluctantly agrees. On their date, both talk about their personal lives. Tanimura's girlfriend could not commit to him, while Erika admits that she is seeing another man because of Kitaru's apathy. Despite her "unfaithfulness," she admits that Kitaru holds a special place in her heart, and has vivid dreams of them as a couple. Tanimura retells his experience with her to Kitaru during their next shift, omitting certain details. A week later, Kitaru quits and Tanimura loses contact with both Kitaru and Erika.

Sixteen years later, in his thirties, Tanimura sees Erika at a wine-tasting event. He reveals that he is married, but Erika is still single. As far as she knows, Kitaru is a sushi chef in Denver and is also still single. He goes on to ask whether she had sex with the man she mentioned on their date years ago; she replies yes, but that it did not lead to anything and that she still thinks about Kitaru on occasion.

The title of the story comes from The Beatles' "Yesterday" and how, upon hearing it, Tanimura is reminded of Kitaru's playful mistranslation of the lyrics into "Kansai Japanese."

=== "An Independent Organ" ===
Tanimura tells of a time in his life when he regularly played squash with Dr. Tokai, a 52-year-old cosmetic surgeon and bachelor who has never lived long-term or fallen into a serious relationship with anyone. However, Tokai falls in love with a 36-year-old married mother and asks Tanimura for advice. During their conversation, Tokai mentions how he is struggling with the question, "Who in the world am I?" and retells a story of a Jewish doctor who lost everything but his life at Auschwitz and how that could have been him. Tokai also notes that for the first time in his life, he feels rage.

Tokai suddenly stops coming to the gym soon after and it is not until two months later that Tanimura learns of his death from Tokai's office assistant Goto; they arrange to meet and discuss Tokai. Goto tells of how the doctor suddenly changed his habits at work: he gave off a different aura than before. After Tokai stopped showing up at work, Goto grows concerned and goes to Tokai's apartment and finds him bedridden and feeble. He learns that Tokai has given up on life after the woman Tokai loves abandoned both him and her husband for a third lover. Tokai, lovesick and heartbroken, condemns himself to a slow death by anorexia. Goto concludes by giving Tanimura a squash racket Tokai wanted him to have and asks Tanimura to not forget Tokai.

The title of the story comes from Tanimura's memory of Tokai's observation that women have "an independent organ" that allows them to lie with a clear conscience.

=== "Scheherazade" ===
Unable to go outside of his apartment, Habara relies on a female nurse he dubs "Scheherazade" for his provisions. Despite being married with children, she visits him regularly to have sex with him; after each session, she tells him a story. She also notes that she was a lamprey in her previous life and can sometimes access those memories of being in the sea.

Over the course of several encounters, Scheherazade tells of how she was madly in love with a boy from high school, so much so that she discreetly broke into his house several times with a hidden doormat key during school hours. While inside, she surveys his stuff, lies on his bed, and "exchanges" her stuff for his, too afraid to be a burglar. On her first two visits, she trades a tampon for a pencil and then three strands of her own hair for a small soccer badge. On her third visit, she finally steals one of his worn shirts. Upon remembering how infatuated she was with him at the time, she asks Habara to have sex with her again; he finds this session more passionate than any other.

Upon returning for her fourth break-in, Scheherazade notices that the locks have changed and reluctantly goes back to her regular schooling. Eventually, she begins to forget the boy, but during nursing school, she saw the boy again through the boy's mother. Noticing that evening is upon them, she tells Habara that she will tell him the circumstances during her next visit. Eager but careful, he acquiesces, but that night in bed, he worries that he will never see her again.

=== "Kino" ===
Kino, with the help of his retiring aunt, decides to open up a bar after he finds out his wife's affair with her lover, his co-worker. At first, no one shows up but a cat, which he lets stay indefinitely. A week later, a mysterious man, Kamita, begins to frequent the bar because he finds the establishment a soothing place to read. Some time after, two customers cause a ruckus and Kino asks them to leave. They react threateningly, but Kamita insists and they redirect their enmity towards him. The three customers go outside, and shortly afterwards, Kamita returns and says that those men will not disturb Kino again.

A week later, Kino notes a particular woman who frequents the bar. However, on this occasion, her male companion is absent; she interests him because of their mutual fondness of jazz. After everyone else has left, she reveals her body to him; she has many scars, the result of cigarette burns. They subsequently have sex all night in Kino's upstairs bedroom.

After his divorce is finalized, his wife comes to his bar to settle a few last matters. She says sorry, but Kino is unable to even understand the meaning of the apology. Some time later, the cat disappears and does not return; instead, snakes begin to show up regularly. He calls his aunt for advice, and she suggests that it could be an omen. Kamita returns, and tells him that he has been working for his aunt and insists that he temporarily close the bar and go on a trip to soul-search. During his trip, he sees people happy doing mundane work and wonders about his own life. During a night when he perceives there is strange knocking on his door, he comes to terms with himself, realizing that he has been living for so long in apathy.

=== "Samsa in Love" ===
The story begins, "He woke to discover that he had undergone a metamorphosis and become Gregor Samsa." He is sure of who he is but unsure of his surroundings. He is hungry, so he slowly goes downstairs to the kitchen, getting accustomed to moving his body. Food is already prepared on the table, so he eats everything. He then notices that he is naked, so he searches the house until he finds a gown.

When the doorbell rings, he opens it to find a young, hunchbacked female locksmith apprentice who says that she is here to fix a lock in the house. Hesitant, he tells her that one of the room's lock upstairs needs fixing. As they interact, Samsa notices that he is unable to understand some of the common words she uses. When she tells him that she needs to take the lock to her family of locksmiths for further work, he asks her why she rotates her arm so often. She says that her brassiere is uncomfortable on her; while telling him this she notices that he has an erection. Offended, she scorns him before he says that he has no idea what he is doing. Before she leaves, he asks her if she could return so that they could talk, as he is still confused about most of the world. She says perhaps they can do so when she returns the lock, before she walks back to her family through military-occupied Prague.

=== "Men Without Women" ===
An unnamed narrator receives a phone call in the middle of the night telling him that his former lover, who he dubs M, has committed suicide; the caller is M's husband. He is unbearably anguished upon learning of this news.

The narrator tells of how he imagines himself meeting M when they were fourteen and in junior high school. He asks her for an eraser in class and she breaks hers in half and gives the piece to him; this meeting warms his heart. She then breaks his heart by running off with sailors who promise to show her the world. He chases her, but is never able to catch up.

In reality, he knew her for only about two years in his adult life and they only saw each other a few times a month. She loves elevator music, and always plays "A Summer Place" when they have sex. He notes that because of her death, he now considers himself the second-loneliest man in the world, after her husband. He is also in a state called "Men Without Women," a period of sudden and intense misery after a man learns of the death of a beloved woman.

== Critical reception ==
Lucy Scholes, writing for The Independent, states that the stories "strung together [a]re a sparkling strand of precious stones, the light refracted from each equally brilliant but the tones varying subtly." Heller McAlpin, writing for The Washington Post, states that "[Murakami's] meandering, mesmerizing tales of profound alienation are driven by puzzling circumstances that neither his characters nor readers can crack — recalling existentialist Gabriel Marcel’s assertion that 'Life is not a problem to be solved but a mystery to be experienced.'"

== Adaptation ==
The short story "Drive My Car" (and, to a lesser degree, "Scheherazade" and “Kino”) served as the basis for the 2021 film of the same name by Ryusuke Hamaguchi. The film was nominated for four awards at the 94th Academy Awards, winning Best International Feature Film, and received numerous other accolades.
