= Philip Gabriel =

American Japanologist

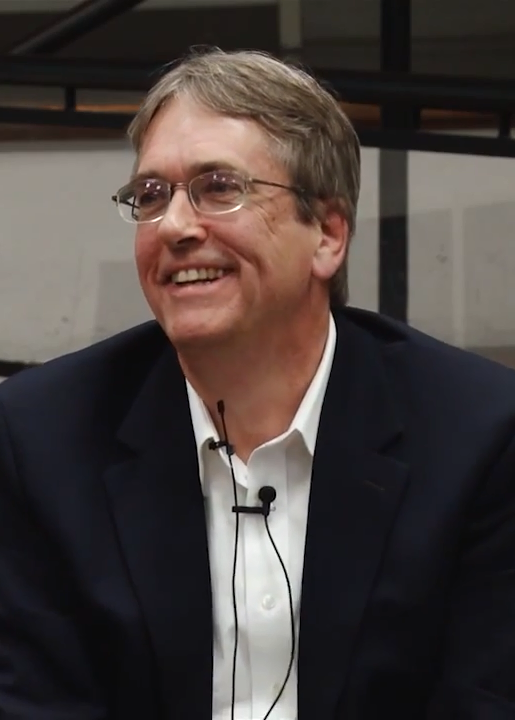
- Philip Gabriel in 2013
- Born: James Philip Gabriel; 1953 (age 72–73); Fort Ord, California, U.S.
- Education: Cornell University (PhD)
- Occupations: Professor, translator
- Employer: University of Arizona

James Philip Gabriel (born 1953) is an American translator and Japanologist. He is a full professor and former department chair of the University of Arizona's Department of East Asian Studies and is one of the major translators into English of the works of the Japanese novelist Haruki Murakami.

Gabriel was born in 1953 at Fort Ord, California. Gabriel earned an undergraduate degree in Chinese and a Master's in Japanese. He taught in Japan for seven years in the late 1970s and 1980s. He later completed a doctorate in Japanese at Cornell University.

Gabriel is also the translator of works by Nobel Prize-winner Kenzaburō Ōe, such as Somersault, and Senji Kuroi, such as Life in the Cul-De-Sac. Dr. Gabriel is also the author of Mad Wives and Island Dreams: Shimao Toshio and the Margins of Japanese Literature. He is currently a professor of modern Japanese literature and department head of East Asian Studies at the University of Arizona in Tucson, Arizona, and his translations have appeared in The New Yorker, Harper's, and other publications. Dr. Gabriel is the recipient of the 2001 Sasakawa Prize for Japanese Literature, the 2001 Japan-U.S. Friendship Commission Prize for the Translation of Japanese Literature, and the 2006 PEN/Book-of-the-Month Club Translation Prize for Kafka on the Shore.

== Bibliography ==
=== Translations ===
- 1Q84, Book Three: "October–December", Haruki Murakami
- Colorless Tsukuru Tazaki and His Years of Pilgrimage, Haruki Murakami
- Kafka on the Shore, Haruki Murakami
- Killing Commendatore, Haruki Murakami
- What I Talk About When I Talk About Running, Haruki Murakami
- The Travelling Cat Chronicles, Hiro Arikawa
- South of the Border, West of the Sun, Haruki Murakami
- Sputnik Sweetheart, Haruki Murakami
- First Person Singular, Haruki Murakami
- Life in the Cul-de-Sac, Kuroi Senji
- Lonely Castle in the Mirror, Mizuki Tsujimura
- Real World, Natsuo Kirino
- The City and Its Uncertain Walls, Haruki Murakami
- Villain, Shuichi Yoshida
- Parade, Shuichi Yoshida
- Honeybees and Distant Thunder, Riku Onda
- Dinner at the Night Library, Hika Harada

== See also ==
- Alfred Birnbaum
- Jay Rubin
