= The Wind-Up Bird Chronicle =

1994–1995 novel by Haruki Murakami

- First US edition cover
- Author: Haruki Murakami
- Original title: ねじまき鳥クロニクル; Nejimakidori Kuronikuru
- Translator: Jay Rubin
- Language: Japanese
- Published: Shinchosha (JP); 1997 (Vintage) (US)
- Publication place: Japan
- Media type: Print (Hardcover)
- Pages: 607
- ISBN: 0-679-77543-9
- OCLC: 39915729

The Wind-Up Bird Chronicle (ねじまき鳥クロニクル, Nejimakidori Kuronikuru) is a novel published in 1994–1995 by Japanese author Haruki Murakami. The American translation and its British adaptation, dubbed the "only official translations" (English), are by Jay Rubin and were first published in 1997. For this novel, Murakami received the Yomiuri Literary Award, which was awarded to him by one of his harshest former critics, Kenzaburō Ōe.

== Publication history ==
The original Japanese edition was released in three parts, which make up the three "books" of the single-volume English-language version.

1. Book of the Thieving Magpie (泥棒かささぎ編, Dorobō Kasasagi-hen)
2. Book of the Prophesying Bird (予言する鳥編, Yogensuru Tori-hen)
3. Book of the Bird-Catcher Man (鳥刺し男編, Torisashi Otoko-hen)

In English translation, two chapters were originally published in The New Yorker under the titles "The Zoo Attack" on July 31, 1995, and "Another Way to Die" on January 20, 1997. A slightly different version of the first chapter translated by Alfred Birnbaum was published in the collection The Elephant Vanishes under the title "The Wind-up Bird and Tuesday's Women". In addition, the character name Noboru Wataya appears in the short story "Family Affair" in The Elephant Vanishes. While having a similar personality and background, the character is not related to the one in The Wind-Up Bird Chronicle of the same name. Noboru Wataya is also used in Jay Rubin's translation of the title short story in The Elephant Vanishes.

In May 2010, Harvill Secker published the Limited Centenary Edition of The Wind-Up Bird Chronicle to celebrate the publisher's hundredth year of operation. It was limited to 2,500 copies.

== Plot summary ==
The first part, "The Thieving Magpie", begins with the narrator, Toru Okada, a low-key and unemployed lawyer's assistant, being tasked by his wife, Kumiko, to find their missing cat. Kumiko suggests looking in the alley, a closed-off strip of land behind their house. After Toru stays there for a while with no luck, May Kasahara, a teenager who had been watching him camping out in the alley for some time, questions him. She invites him to her house to sit on the patio and look over an abandoned house she says is a popular hangout for the stray cats. The abandoned house is revealed to possibly contain some strange omen, as it had brought bad luck to all of its prior tenants. It also contains an empty well. Toru receives sexual phone calls from a woman who says she knows him. He also receives a phone call from Malta Kano who asks to meet with him.

Kumiko calls Toru to explain that he should meet with the clairvoyant Malta Kano, who will help with finding the cat. Malta Kano had come recommended by Kumiko's brother, Noboru Wataya, which is also the name given to the cat. Kumiko's family believes in fortune-telling and had previously stipulated that the couple meet with an elderly man, Mr. Honda, for consultations on a regular basis, which they did for some time. (Instead of giving advice, he spends most of their sessions retelling the same story of his experience in the Kwantung Army in the lost tank battle with the Russians at Nomonhan on the Manchukuo-Russian border during World War II.) Toru meets the mysterious Malta Kano at a busy hotel restaurant, and she tasks her sister Creta Kano to further the work. Both sisters wear unusual clothing: Malta a large red hat and Creta unstylish 1960s clothing. Creta meets Toru at his home and begins to tell him the story of her past, involving being raped by Noboru, but abruptly leaves. Toru notices Kumiko is wearing perfume that has been gifted to her by some unknown person. The cat remains missing. Toru is contacted by Lieutenant Mamiya, who informs Toru that Mamiya's old war friend corporal Honda has died and that Mamiya wishes to visit Toru to drop off an item that Honda had bequeathed to him. The first section ends with Lieutenant Mamiya arriving and telling Toru a long tale about his eerie and mystical wartime experiences in Manchukuo in the Kwantung Army, where he sees a man skinned alive. Mamiya was also left to die in a deep well before being saved by corporal Honda. The gift from Honda is an empty box.

Kumiko is revealed to be missing at the start of the second part, "Bird as Prophet". Shortly after, Toru finds out through a meeting with Noboru and Malta that Kumiko has apparently been spending time with another man and wants to end her relationship with Toru. Confused, Toru tries several things to calm himself and think through the situation: talking and taking up work with May Kasahara, hiding at the bottom of the well, and loitering around the city looking at people. Work with May involves tallying up people with some degree of baldness at a subway line for a wig company. While at the bottom of the well (of the abandoned house), Toru reminisces about earlier times with Kumiko, including their first date to an aquarium where they looked at jellyfish. He also experiences a dreamlike sequence where he enters a hotel room and speaks with a woman, and notices a strange blue mark on his cheek after he leaves the well. While loitering in the city, he spends most of the day sitting outside a donut shop and people-watching. Through this activity, Toru encounters a well-dressed woman and also a singer he recognizes from his past, whom he follows and beats with a bat after getting ambushed by him.

"The Birdcatcher", the third, final, and lengthiest part, ties up most loose ends while introducing a few new characters. The well-dressed woman Toru met while people-watching is revealed to be Nutmeg, whom he sees again when he reverts to people-watching. She hires him to relieve clients, middle-aged or older women, of some kind of inner turmoil that develops inside them. The blue mark is involved in this somehow, though its power is never fully explained. In return, Toru receives pay and partial possession of the abandoned house that had been purchased to resell by some property agency. Cinnamon, Nutmeg's son, maintains the house and refits the well with a ladder and pulley to open and close the well cap from the bottom. Toru periodically goes to the bottom of the well to think and attempt to revisit the hotel room. The cat, who has been hardly mentioned following Kumiko's disappearance, shows up at Toru's home after nearly a year of being missing. Toru discusses Kumiko's disappearance with Noboru directly and indirectly (through his agent Ushikawa) and eventually arranges for a talk with her through the Internet, using her recollection of the jellyfish date as a means to verify her identity. Finally, Toru is able to travel to the hotel room from the well and confronts the woman, realizing that she is Kumiko and breaking the spell. It is revealed in this reality that Noboru has been beaten into a coma by a bat, with the assailant described to look just like Toru. An unknown man enters the hotel room and attacks Toru, the intruder, with a knife. Toru fights back with the bat and kills the man, before escaping back to the well. In the well, bruised and unable to move, Toru passes out after the well fills with water. Cinnamon saves him, and some days later Nutmeg notifies him that in this reality Noboru had a stroke and is now in a coma. Kumiko sends him a message on the computer to let him know she is alright but intends to kill Noboru by pulling the plug on the life support. She reveals that she did not cheat on Toru with just one man, but in fact there were several. Noboru's obsession with their middle sister, continued with Kumiko, triggered sex addiction in her until Noboru stepped in. Subsequently, in a discussion between Toru and May, Toru says Kumiko was successful in killing Noboru and is now serving time in jail after admitting the deed — time of her own volition, because she is waiting for the media circus to end so neither she nor Toru are targeted. Toru says that he will wait for her, and bids May goodbye.

== Main characters ==
While this book has many major and minor characters, these are among the most important:

- Toru Okada: The narrator and protagonist, Toru is a passive and often apathetic young man living in suburban Japan. He is Kumiko's husband and continually follows the orders or wishes of others. Toru is portrayed as an average man and the embodiment of passivity. He is a legal aid who is considering a law degree but has chosen to leave his job at a legal firm. He spends his days doing house chores, cooking pasta, listening to the radio, and searching for their missing cat. At the beginning of the novel, his life is mundane. Toru spends a lot of time alone and the reader can see that he is not in control of many aspects of his life. His search for their missing cat leads him into interesting adventures.
- Kumiko Okada: Kumiko is Toru's wife and, as the breadwinner of the couple, is the more autonomous of the two. She works in the publishing business. Following the disappearance of their cat, she disappears as well. Kumiko's childhood was stifling because her parents wanted her to take the place of an older sister who had committed suicide at a very young age, an event that became an obsession of their older brother, Noboru Wataya.
- Noboru Wataya: Noboru is Kumiko's older brother. He is presented as a mediagenic figure; the public loves him, but Toru cannot stand him. Noboru first appears as an academic, becomes a politician during the course of the story, and has no apparent personal life. He is said to be hidden behind a façade — all style, and no substance. He is the antagonist. Noboru is constantly changing his image to defeat his opponents, but nobody seems to notice his inconsistencies except Toru. The relationship between Toru and Noboru can be compared to that of good versus evil. ("Noboru Wataya" is also the name Toru and Kumiko gave to their pet cat, whom Toru later renames Mackerel; the character name also appeared in "The Elephant Vanishes" and "Family Affair", both translated by Jay Rubin, in The Elephant Vanishes collection.)
- May Kasahara: May is a teenage girl who should be in school, but, by choice, is not. Toru and May carry on a fairly constant exchange throughout a good deal of the novel; when May is not present, she writes letters to him. Their conversations in person are often bizarre and revolve around death and the deterioration of human life. Even more bizarre is the cheerful and decidedly non-serious air with which these conversations take place.
- Lieutenant Mamiya: Lieutenant Tokutaro Mamiya was an officer in the Kwantung Army during the Japanese occupation of Manchukuo. He meets Toru while carrying out the particulars of Mr. Honda's will. (Honda had been a Corporal, therefore Mamiya had been his superior.) He has been emotionally scarred by witnessing the flaying of a superior officer and several nights spent in a dried-up well. He tells Toru his story both in person and in letters.
- Malta Kano: Malta Kano is a medium of sorts who changed her name to "Malta" after performing some kind of "austerities" on the island of Malta. She is enlisted by Kumiko to help the Okadas find their missing cat.
- Creta Kano: Malta's younger sister and apprentice of sorts, she describes herself as a "prostitute of the mind." Her real given name is Setsuko. She had been an actual prostitute during her college years but quit after a session with a young Noboru Wataya, who effectively raped her with a foreign object. Disturbingly for Toru, Creta's body bears a near-identical resemblance to Kumiko's from the neck down.
- Nutmeg Akasaka: Nutmeg first meets Toru as he sits on a bench watching people's faces every day in Shinjuku. The second time they meet she is attracted to the blue-black mark on his right cheek. She and Toru share a few strange coincidences: the wind-up bird in Toru's yard and the blue-black cheek mark appear in Nutmeg's World War II-related stories, and also Nutmeg's father and Lieutenant Mamiya (an acquaintance of Toru's) are linked by their experiences with violence and death in Manchukuo and the rise and dissolution of the Kwantung Army during World War II. "Nutmeg Akasaka" is a pseudonym she chose for herself after insisting to Toru that her "real" name is irrelevant.
- Cinnamon Akasaka: Cinnamon is Nutmeg's adult son who has not spoken since the age of 6, owing to some events involving the cry of a wind-up bird and shock of finding a live heart buried under their garden tree. He communicates through a system of hand movements and mouthed words. Somehow, people who've just met him (who presumably have never lipread or used sign language) find him perfectly comprehensible. "Cinnamon," too, is a pseudonym created by Nutmeg. He is described as a perfect reflection of his well groomed mother.
- The Cat: Named Noboru Wataya after Kumiko's older brother, the cat symbolizes marital happiness between Kumiko and Toru. The cat leaving signifies the leaving of happiness in Kumiko and Toru's marriage. Once the cat leaves, Kumiko and Toru suffer many difficulties but when the cat returns, though a little changed and renamed Mackerel, it signifies that Toru is now ready to communicate with Kumiko and save her from the trap she has been placed in by her brother.

== Themes ==
- Desire: The feeling of desire arises throughout the novel in a variety of characters. Throughout the novel, desire seems to manifest itself in negative and almost sickening ways. One example, is displayed through Noboru Wataya, who desires power. This desire for power brings him to commit incestuous acts with his two younger sisters, one sister being alive with the other sister being deceased. In the beginning, Toru desires to make his wife happy by going on long day trips to find her missing cat. His desire for her leads him to strange places where he discovers more about his inner self. Kumiko has many sexual desires which leads her to be unfaithful to Toru, resulting in Kumiko catching an STD. Throughout the novel desire leads the characters to dark places.
- Power: The characters in the novel are constantly gaining or losing power and the plot develops around this ever-changing factor. Noboru Wataya is mainly focused on gaining power which in turn causes his younger sister Kumiko to lose power to him, she becomes a victim of his desire for power. The loss of power of the character Kumiko leads Toru to gain power. Once Kumiko goes missing, this event forces Toru to find power within him to step out of his normalcy and comfort zone to find Kumiko and save her from her brother. This leads him on a mission to set Kumiko free of the reins her brother holds her in. Translating to a gain in his sense of power. He finds power within himself and his desire to set Kumiko free. Power also shows in the characters as they try to gain control over their own emotions.
- Polar opposites: Throughout the novel, one can see many examples of the characters being polar opposites. One main polar opposite occurs in the beginning of the book between the two women in Toru's life. The mysterious woman who calls Toru throughout the beginning presents herself very sexually and powerful. She is very confident in speaking with Toru even while he is resistant to hearing what she has to say. Whereas, Kumiko, Toru's wife, is very shy and soft spoken in the interactions with Toru. Another example of polar opposites is between Noboru Wataya, Kumiko's Brother, and Toru. Noboru Wataya is hungry for power and is presented as a strong and disrespectful character. Whereas, Toru is presented as a very shy, soft spoken, respectful, and down to earth character. Creta Kano points out this polar opposite within the novel stating "Noboru Wataya is a person who belongs to a world that is the exact opposite of yours." The contrast of polar opposite characters provides more depth and individuality to each character alone.
- Alienation: Throughout the novel the characters are obviously related to each other but they never feel like they connect to one another. All of the characters develop independently and tend to live solitary lifestyles. This can be presented in Toru and Kumiko's marriage. Throughout the novel, Toru presents himself to be one who seeks solitude. One example is presented as he completes an everyday task, "I went to the Municipal pool for a swim. Mornings were the best, to avoid the crowds". His desire for solitude also is shown when he quits his job to take care of the house alone while Kumiko goes to work. He enjoys being home alone. In the relationship between Kumiko and Toru, both characters seem to be developing in solitude. Both characters hide many of their thoughts from one another and even though they are married Toru ponders on the fact that he may not know much about his wife.

== English translation ==
The English translation of the novel was carried out by Jay Rubin. In addition to notable differences between the Japanese and English versions, there are also differences between the original Japanese hardcover and paperback editions.

Further differences exist between the American and British editions, but these are much more superficial.

The German translation by Giovanni and Ditte Bandini is based on the English translation, not on the Japanese original. Nearly 20 years after the first translation Ursula Gräfe translated the book from the Japanese original, including also the missing chapters. 'Die Chroniken des Aufziehvogels'.

The Dutch translation by Jacques Westerhoven was translated directly from the Japanese original, therefore includes the missing parts and chapters, and follows the same order as the Japanese version.

=== Chapters and parts removed from English translation ===
Some chapters and paragraphs of the Japanese paperback edition were not included in the English translation. Translator Jay Rubin cut about 61 of 1,379 pages, including three chapters (Book 2 Chapters 15, 18, and part of 17; and Book 3 Chapter 26). Combining the original three-volumes (Japanese) would have been too long, and so the publisher requested that ~25,000 words be cut for the English translation, even though Rubin had presented them a complete translation along with the requested abridged version.

These chapters contain plot elements not found elsewhere in the book. For example, the two missing chapters from the second volume of the original three-volume elaborate on the relationship between Toru Okada and Creta Kano, and a "hearing" of the wind-up bird as Toru burns a box of Kumiko's belongings (Book 2 Chapter 15). In the third volume, the computer conversation between Toru and Noboru Wataya (Book 3 Chapter 26) and Toru's encounter with Ushikawa at the train station are also omitted.

In addition to reducing the word count, some chapters were moved ahead of others, taking them out of the context of the original order. At the start of Book 3 the chapters have been rearranged. Rubin combined two chapters called "May Kasahara's POV" and moved the "Hanging House" chapter to make the chronology of events consistent.

Book 2 chapter 15 summary: In chapter 15 Toru awakens to Creta Kano who mysteriously appeared in his bed the night before. She tells him that she has lost her name and asks if he would like to flee Japan with her. To this request he agrees and leaves behind memorabilia of his old life with his wife. While Toru is in town gathering supplies for his flee he reads an article about Noboru Wataya, the article explains that Noboru is now trying to become a politician.

Chapter 17 is not completely removed, instead the excerpt where Toru takes passport photos is removed and the very lengthy conversation Toru has with his uncle about buying real estate is condensed into one English paragraph.

Book 2 Chapter 18 summary: Creta Kano returns to Japan and Toru tells her that he will not be fleeing with her. After this he meets with May Kasahara and they watch the demolition of the Miyawaki house. Later in the chapter Toru is swimming at the ward pool where he dreams in the pool about floating at the bottom of the well, presented in earlier chapters, and hearing horses dying during an eclipse. This leads him to the realization that the mysterious woman on the phone was actually his wife. Ending book 2 with this cliffhanger.

== Reception ==
Kirkus Reviews wrote that the novel was "a major work bringing signature themes of alienation, dislocation, and nameless fears through the saga of a gentle man forced to trade the familiar for the utterly unknown" and "a fully mature, engrossing tale of individual and national destinies entwined" that would be "hard to surpass."

Michiko Kakutani, in The New York Times, regarded the novel as "a wildly ambitious book that not only recapitulates the themes, motifs and preoccupations of his earlier work, but also aspires to invest that material with weighty mythic and historical significance" though was "only intermittently successful." While she finds that the novel succeeds in articulating that the world is "a mysterious place", that same confusion also "seems so messy that its refusal of closure feels less like an artistic choice than simple laziness".

== Legacy ==
Many regard The Wind-Up Bird Chronicle as Murakami's masterpiece, and it appeared in The Telegraph's 2014 list of the 10 all-time greatest Asian novels.

== Adaptation ==
An adaptation of the novel was created by Stephen Earnhart; a live production of it premiered in 2011 at the Edinburgh International Festival.
