= Pivert =

Pivert may refer to:

- Marceau Pivert (1895, Montmachoux, Seine-et-Marne – 1958), a French schoolteacher, trade unionist, Socialist activist and politician
- Étienne Pivert de Senancour (1770, Paris – 1846, Saint-Cloud), a French writer
- Virginie Pivert de Senancour (1791–1876), the daughter of essayist Étienne Pivert de Senancour
