= Cool (aesthetic) =

Attitude, behavior, appearance, or style which is generally admired

Coolness, or being cool, is the aesthetic quality of something (such as attitude, behavior, appearance, or style) being compatible with currently admirable social norms of society or a group of people. Because of the varied and changing interpretation of what is considered cool, as well as its subjective nature, the word has no single meaning. For most, coolness is associated with exemplifying composure and self-control. When used in conversation, it is often as an expression of admiration or approval, and can be used when referencing both people and items of interest. As an aesthetic quality, cool was first used in African-American Vernacular English by jazz musicians in the 1940s, and from there spread into General American English. Although commonly regarded as slang, cool is widely used among disparate social groups and has endured in usage for generations.

== Definition ==
Below are some concise definitions that try to capture its different usages:

- "If status is about standing, cool is about standing free." – Grant McCracken
- "Cool is a knowledge, a way of life." – Lewis MacAdams
- "Cool is an age-specific phenomenon, defined as the central behavioural trait of teenagerhood."
- "Coolness is the proper way you represent yourself to a human being." – Robert Farris Thompson
- In the novel Spook Country by William Gibson, one character equates cool with a sense of exclusivity: "'Secrets,' said the Bigend beside her, 'are the very root of cool.'"
- In the novel Lords and Ladies by Terry Pratchett, the "Monks of Cool" are mentioned. In their passing-out test, a novice must select the "coolest" garment from a room full of clothes. The correct answer is "Hey, whatever I select", suggesting that cool is primarily an attitude of self-assurance.
- "Coolness is a subjective and dynamic, socially constructed positive trait attributed to cultural objects (people, brands, products, trends, etc.) inferred to be appropriately autonomous."

=== Base meaning ===
In contemporary informal English, cool is often used almost synonymously with hip, trendy or fashionable, especially for clothes, music and brands.

In another sense, cool is used as a general positive epithet or interjection, which can have a range of related adjectival meanings.

While slang terms are usually short-lived coinages and figures of speech, cool is an especially ubiquitous slang word, most notably among young people. As well as being understood throughout the English-speaking world, the word has even entered the vocabulary of several languages outside English, and several languages have their own words for the concept.

=== Additional elements ===
==== Autonomous behavioral characteristic ====
The sum and substance of coolness is a self-conscious confidence in overall behavior, which entails a set of specific behavioral characteristics that is firmly anchored in symbology, a set of discernible bodily movements, postures, facial expressions, and voice modulations that are acquired and take on strategic social value within certain contexts.

Cool was once an attitude fostered by rebels and underdogs—such as slaves, prisoners, bikers, political dissidents, etc.—for whom open rebellion invited punishment, so they hid defiance behind a wall of ironic detachment, distancing that defiance from the source of authority rather than directly confronting it.

In general, coolness is a trait based on the inference that a cultural object (e.g., a person or brand) is autonomous; that is, the person or brand is not constrained by certain existing "unnecessary" rules, expectations, or beliefs.

A cultural ideal has emerged from this characteristic which is a socially admired way of being that combines self-control, apparent effortlessness and emotional restraint. It is often shaped by artists, intellectuals and other tastemakers, then spread through popular media and youth culture as a marker of identity and distinction. The ideal is associated with autonomy, distance from authority and the conversion of marginal or oppositional positions into style and prestige. Commercial industries draw on ideas of cool in branding and advertising, while marginalized communities have also used them as forms of protection or symbolic resistance.

==== Peaceful state of being ====
Cool is also used for describing a general state of calmness and well-being, or similarly, a transcendent, internal state of peace and serenity. It can also refer to an absence of conflict, a state of harmony and balance, as in "the land is cool," or as in a "cool [spiritual] heart." Such meanings, according to Thompson, are African in origin. Cool is related in this sense to both social control and transcendental balance.

Cool can similarly be used to describe composure and an absence of excitement or agitation in a person, especially in times of stress (as expressed in the idiom keep one's cool).

== Social theories and aspects ==
=== Subjectiveness ===
According to this theory, coolness is a subjective, dynamic, socially-constructed trait, such that it is subjective. People perceive things (e.g., other people, products or brands) to be cool based on an inference of "autonomy". That is, something is perceived to be cool when it follows its own motivations. However, this theory proposes that the level of autonomy that leads to coolness is constrained. An inappropriate level of autonomy that opposes a legitimate norm does not lead to perceptions of coolness. The level of autonomy considered appropriate is influenced by different variables for each individual. For example, people who think that societal institutions and authority are unjust or repressive equate coolness with higher levels of autonomy than those who are less critical of social norms and authority.

=== Social distinctiveness ===
According to this theory, coolness is a relative concept. In other words, cool exists only in comparison with things considered less cool. For example, in the book The Rebel Sell, cool is created out of a need for status and distinction. This creates a situation analogous to an arms race, in which cool is perpetuated by a collective action problem in society.

=== Elusiveness ===
According to this theory, cool is a real, but unknowable property. Cool, like "good", is a property that exists but can only be sought after. In the New Yorker article, "The Coolhunt", cool is given three characteristics:

- "The act of discovering what's cool is what causes cool to move on".
- "Cool cannot be manufactured, only observed".
- "[Cool] can only be observed by those who are themselves cool".

== Regional differences ==
One of the essential characteristics of cool is its mutability—what is considered cool changes over time and varies among cultures and generations.

=== Africa and the African diaspora ===
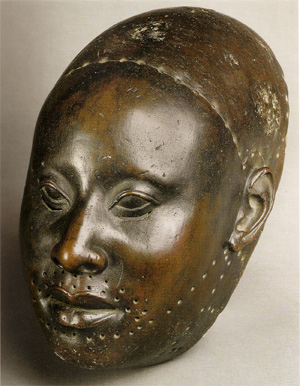
Yoruba bronze head sculpture from the city of Ife, Nigeria c. 12th century A.D

Author Robert Farris Thompson, professor of art history at Yale University, suggests that Itutu, which he translates as "mystic coolness", is one of three pillars of a religious philosophy created in the 15th century by the Yoruba and Igbo civilizations of West Africa. Cool, or Itutu, contained meanings of conciliation and gentleness of character, generosity, grace, and the ability to defuse fights and disputes. It was also associated with physical beauty. In Yoruba culture, Itutu is connected to water. This also gives it a connotation related to temperature. Thompson also cites a definition of cool from the Gola people of Liberia, who define it as the ability to be mentally calm or detached, in an otherworldly fashion, from one's circumstances, to be nonchalant in situations where emotionalism or eagerness would be natural and expected. Joseph M. Murphy writes that cool is also closely associated with the deity Òsun of the Yoruba religion.

Thompson acknowledges similarities between African and European cool in shared notions of self-control and imperturbability. However, he finds the cultural value of cool in Africa, which influenced the African diaspora, to be different from that held by Europeans, who use the term primarily as the ability to remain calm under stress. According to Thompson, there is significant weight, meaning, and spirituality attached to coolness in traditional African cultures, something which Thompson argues is absent from coolness in the Western context:

The telling point is that the "mask" of coolness is worn not only in time of stress, but also of pleasure, in fields of expressive performance and the dance. Struck by the re-occurrence of this vital notion elsewhere in tropical Africa and in the Pan-American African Diaspora, I have come to term the attitude "an aesthetic of the cool" in the sense of a deeply and completely motivated, consciously artistic, interweaving of elements serious and pleasurable, of responsibility and play.

==== African Americans ====
Ronald Perry writes that many words and expressions have passed from African-American Vernacular English into Standard English slang, including the contemporary meaning of the word cool. The definition, meaning "something fashionable", is said to have been popularized in jazz circles by tenor saxophonist Lester Young. This predominantly black jazz scene in the U.S., as well as expatriate musicians in Paris, helped popularize notions of cool in the U.S. in the 1940s, giving birth to "Bohemian" or beatnik culture. Shortly thereafter, a style of jazz called cool jazz appeared on the music scene, emphasizing a restrained, laid-back solo style. Notions of cool as an expression of inner self in a Taoist sense, equilibrium, self-possession, and an absence of conflict are commonly understood in African-American contexts well. Expressions such as "Don't blow your cool", or later, "chill out", and the use of "chill" as a general characterization of inner contentment or restful repose, all have their origins in African-American Vernacular English. As Ted Gioia wrote in A History of Cool Jazz in 100 Tracks:

When the air in the smoke-filled nightclubs of that era became unbreathable, windows and doors were opened to allow some 'cool air' in from the outside to help clear away the suffocating air. By analogy, the slow and smooth jazz style that was typical for that late-night scene came to be called "cool."

He continued, "The goal [of cool jazz] was always the same: to lower the temperature of the music and bring out different qualities in jazz."

Marlene Kim Connor connects cool and the post-war African-American experience in her book What is Cool?: Understanding Black Manhood in America. Connor writes that cool is the silent and knowing rejection of racist oppression, a self-dignified expression of masculinity developed by black men that were denied mainstream expressions of manhood. She writes that mainstream perception of cool is narrow and distorted, with coolness often perceived merely as style or arrogance rather than a way to achieve respect.

Designer Christian Lacroix has said that "the history of cool in America is the history of African-American culture".

Among black men in America, coolness, which may have its roots in slavery as an ironic submission and concealed subversion (as in an article by Thorsten Botz-Bornstein), is enacted at times to create a powerful appearance, a type of performance frequently maintained for the sake of a social audience.

==== Cool pose ====
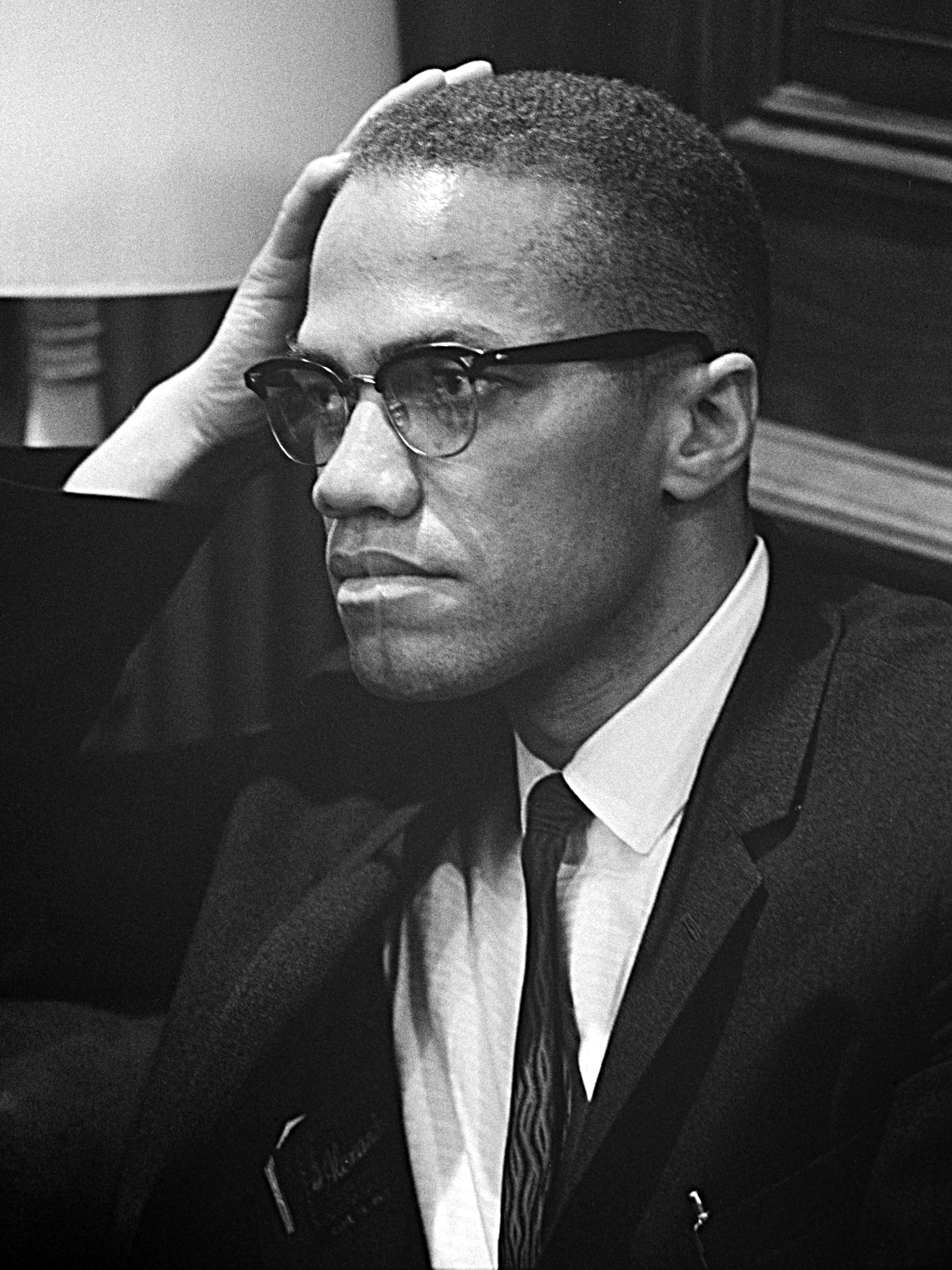
Malcolm X "embodied essential elements of cool".

Cool, though an amorphous quality—more mystique than material—is a pervasive element in urban black male culture. Majors and Billson address what they term the "cool pose" in their study and argue that it helps black men counter stress caused by social oppression, rejection and racism. They also contend that it furnishes the black male with a sense of control, strength, confidence and stability and helps him deal with the closed doors and negative messages of the "generalized other". They also believe that attaining black manhood is filled with pitfalls of discrimination, negative self-image, guilt, shame, and fear.

The "cool pose" may be a factor in discrimination in education, contributing to achievement gaps in test scores. In a 2004 study, researchers found that teachers perceived students with African-American culture-related movement styles, referred to as the "cool pose", as lower in achievement, higher in aggression, and more likely to need special education services than students with standard movement styles, irrespective of race or other academic indicators. The issue of stereotyping and discrimination with respect to the "cool pose" raises complex questions of assimilation and accommodation of different cultural values. Jason W. Osborne identifies the "cool pose" as one of the factors in black underachievement. Robin D. G. Kelley criticizes calls for assimilation and sublimation of black culture, including the "cool pose". He argues that media and academics have unfairly demonized these aspects of black culture. At the same time, through their sustained fascination with blacks as "exotic" others, appropriated aspects of the "cool pose" into the broader popular culture.

George Elliott Clarke writes that Malcolm X, like Miles Davis, embodies essential elements of coolness. As an icon, Malcolm X inspires a complex mixture of both fear and fascination in broader American culture, much like the "cool pose" itself. Bongani Madando considers film icon Sidney Poitier as one who embodies coolness on-screen.

=== East Asia ===
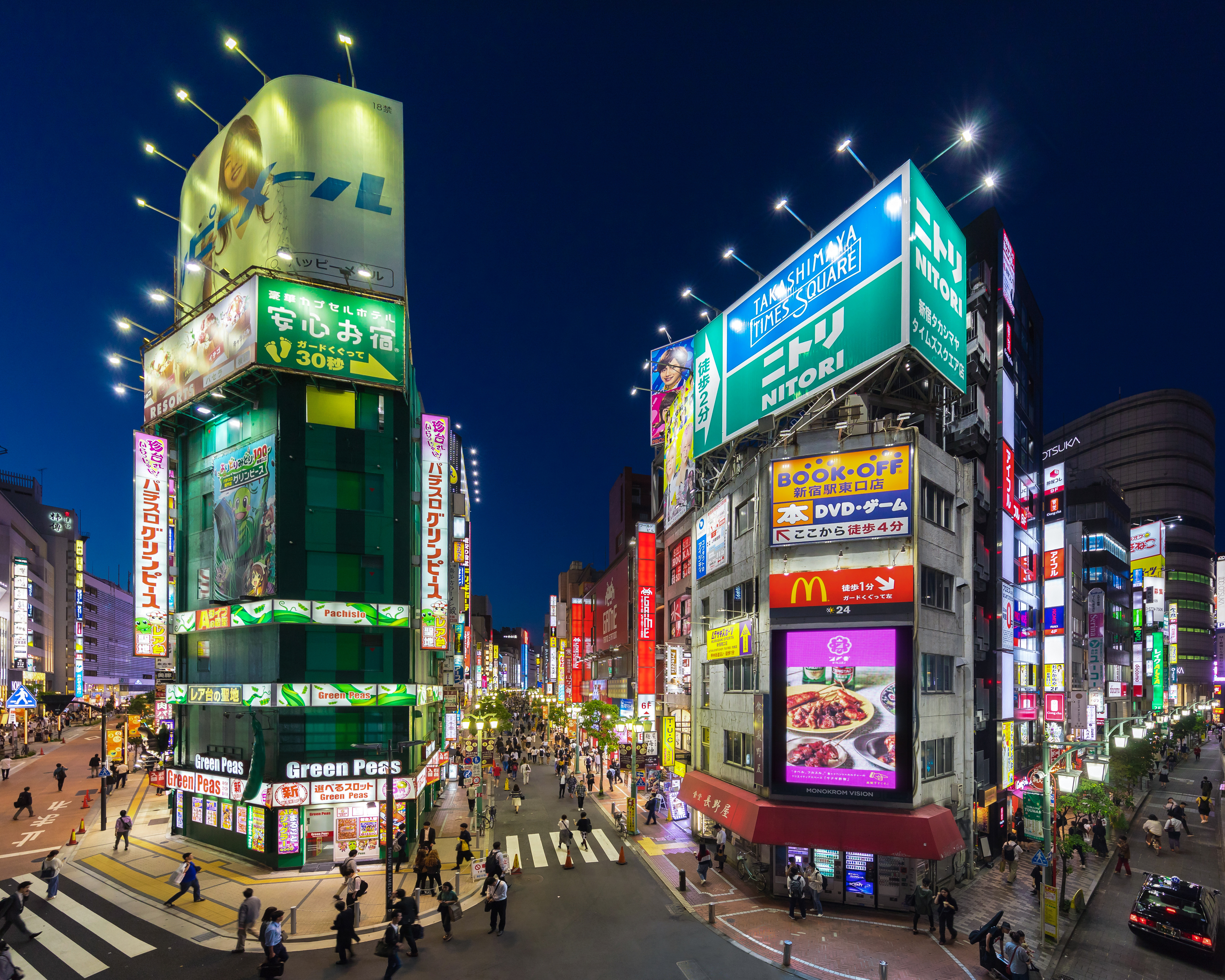
Prof. Paul Waley considers Tokyo one of the world's "capitals of cool".

In Japan, synonyms of cool could be iki and sui, referring to traditional aesthetic ideals among commoners that developed in Edo-period Japan. Some tend to immediately connect the aesthetic of coolness in Japan to samurai, but this is historically inaccurate. In fact, in many art forms including rakugo, samurai from the countryside were often depicted as the target of ridicule by the average commoner in the civilized Edo period.

Some argue that the ethic of the samurai caste in Japan and warrior castes in India and East Asia all resemble what it means to be "cool". The samurai-themed works of film director Akira Kurosawa are among the most praised of the genre, influencing many filmmakers across the world with his techniques and storytelling. Notable works of his include Seven Samurai, Yojimbo, and The Hidden Fortress, the last being one of the primary inspirations for George Lucas's Star Wars (which also borrows a number of aspects from the samurai, for example the Jedi Knights of the series). Samurai have been presented as cool in many modern Japanese movies such as Samurai Fiction, Kagemusha, and Yojimbo.

In The Art of War, a Chinese military treatise written during the 6th century BC, general Sun Tzu, a member of the landless Chinese aristocracy, wrote in Chapter XII:

Profiting by their panic, we shall exterminate them completely; this will cool the King's courage and cover us with glory, besides ensuring the success of our mission.

Asian countries have developed a tradition on their own to explore types of modern "cool" or "ambiguous" aesthetics.

In a Time Asia article, "The Birth of Cool", author Hannah Beech describes Asian coolness as "a revolution in taste led by style gurus who are redefining Chinese craftsmanship in everything from architecture and film to clothing and cuisine" and as a modern aesthetic inspired both by Ming-era minimalism and a strenuous attention to detail.

Paul Waley, professor of Human Geography at the University of Leeds, considers Tokyo, along with New York City, London, and Paris, to be one of the world's "capitals of cool", and The Washington Post's Anthony Faiola called Tokyo "Japan's Empire of Cool" and Japan "the coolest nation on Earth":

Analysts are marveling at the breadth of a recent explosion in cultural exports, and many argue that the international embrace of Japan's pop culture, film, food, style and arts is second only to that of the United States. Business leaders and government officials are now referring to Japan's 'gross national cool' as a new engine for economic growth and societal buoyancy.

The term "gross national cool" was coined by journalist Douglas McGray. In a June/July 2002 article in Foreign Policy magazine, he argued that as Japan's economic juggernaut took a wrong turn into a 10-year slump, and with military power made impossible by a pacifist constitution, the nation had quietly emerged as a cultural powerhouse: "From pop music to consumer electronics, architecture to fashion, and food to art, Japan has far greater cultural influence now than it did in the 1980s, when it was an economic superpower." The notion of Asian "cool" applied to Asian consumer electronics is borrowed from the cultural media theorist Eric McLuhan, who described "cool" or "cold" media as stimulating participants to complete auditive or visual media content, in sharp contrast to "hot" media that degrades the viewer to a merely passive or non-interactive receiver.

=== Europe ===
==== Aristocratic and artistic cool ====
Mona Lisa, or La Gioconda (La Joconde), by Leonardo da Vinci expresses sprezzatura, an "aristocratic cool".

"Aristocratic cool," known as sprezzatura, has existed in Europe for centuries, particularly when relating to frank amorality or illicit pleasures behind closed doors; Raphael's Portrait of Baldassare Castiglione and Leonardo da Vinci's Mona Lisa are classic examples of sprezzatura. The sprezzatura of the Mona Lisa is seen in both her smile and the positioning of her hands. Both the smile and hands are intended to convey her grandeur, self-confidence, and societal position. Literally translating to "disdain and detachment", sprezzatura is the art of refraining from the appearance of trying to present oneself in a particular way. In reality, of course, tremendous exertion went into pretending not to bother or care.

English poet and playwright William Shakespeare used "cool" in several of his works to describe composure and absence of emotion. In A Midsummer Night's Dream, written around 1595 or 1596, he contrasts the shaping fantasies of lovers and madmen with "cool reason", in Hamlet he wrote "O gentle son, upon the heat and flame of thy distemper, sprinkle cool patience", and the antagonist Iago in Othello is musing about "reason to cool our raging motions, our carnal stings, our unbitted lusts."

In The Diary of a Nobody, coolness is used as a criticism: "Upon my word, Gowing's coolness surpasses all belief."

==== European inter-war cool ====
The key themes of modern European coolness were forged by avant-garde artists who achieved prominence in the aftermath of the First World War, most notably Dadaists, such as key Dada figures Arthur Cravan and Marcel Duchamp, and the left-wing milieu of the Weimar Republic. The goal of such groups was often self-consciously revolutionary, a determination to scandalize the bourgeoisie by mocking their culture, sexuality, and political moderation.

Bertolt Brecht, a committed Communist, stands as the archetype of this inter-war cool. Brecht projected his cool attitude to life onto his most famous character Macheath or "Mackie Messer" (Mack the Knife) in The Threepenny Opera. Mackie, the nonchalant, smooth-talking gangster who is an expert with a switchblade, personifies the bitter-sweet strain of cool; Puritanism and sentimentality are both anathema to the cool character.

During the turbulent inter-war years, coolness was a privilege reserved for bohemian milieus like Brecht's. Cool irony and hedonism remained the province of cabaret artistes, ostentatious gangsters, and rich socialites. The luxuries depicted in Evelyn Waugh's Brideshead Revisited and Christopher Isherwood's Goodbye to Berlin traced the outlines of a new cool. Peter Stearns, a professor of history at George Mason University, suggests that the seeds of a cool outlook had been sown among this inter-war generation.

==== Post–World War II cool ====
The Second World War brought the populations of Britain, Germany, and France into intimate contact with Americans and their culture. WWII also brought hundreds of thousands of GIs, whose relaxed, easy-going manner was seen by young people of the time as embodying liberation. To be cool or hip meant "hanging out", pursuing sexual liaisons, displaying a level of narcissistic self-absorption, and expressing a desire to escape all ideological causes. From the late 1940s onward, this popular culture influenced young people all over the world, to the dismay of the ruling paternalistic elites. The French intelligentsia were outraged, while the British educated classes displayed a haughty indifference that displayed traces of an older aristocratic cool.

==== Eastern European cool ====
What it meant to be "cool" resonated behind the Iron Curtain, where it offered relief from the earnestness of socialist propaganda and socialist realism in art. In the Polish industrial city Łódź, jazz, the "forbidden music", served Polish youth of the 1950s much as it had served its African-American creators, both as personal diversion and subterranean resistance to what they saw as a stultifying official culture. Some clubs featured live jazz performances, and their smoky, sexually charged atmosphere carried a message for which the Puritanical values and monumental art of Marxist officialdom were an ideal foil. Arriving in Poland via France, America, and England, Polish coolness stimulated the film talents of a generation of artists, including Andrzej Wajda, Roman Polanski, and other graduates of the National Film School in Łódź, as well as the novelist Jerzy Kosinski, in whose clinical prose cool tends towards the sadistic.

In Prague, the capital of Bohemia, cool flourished in the faded Art Deco splendor of the Café Slavia, which was part of the dissident underground called itself the "Jazz Section", following the crushing of the Prague Spring by Soviet tanks in 1968.

== In marketing ==
[Cool is] a heavily manipulative corporate ethos.

— Kalle Lasn

Over the past decade, young black men in American inner cities have been the market most aggressively mined by brandmasters as a source of borrowed 'meaning' and identity. .. The truth is that the 'got to be cool' rhetoric of the global brands is, more often than not, an indirect way of saying 'got to be black.'

— Designer Christian Lacroix

Coolness can be used as a marketing device, cool can be exploited as a manufactured and empty idea imposed on cultures at large through a top-down process by sellers of popular culture who capitalize on trends and subcultures most often created by youths. These include record company executives, fashion companies, and merchandisers. Furthermore, "cool has become the central ideology of consumer capitalism", resulting in the selling of coolness. This drives many young people and adults to attempt to "fit into" the mainstream and adhere to trends to purchase products and/or brands that make them appear cool.

The concept of cool was often used in this way to market menthol cigarettes to African Americans in the 1960s. In 2004, over 70% of African American smokers preferred menthol cigarettes compared to 30% of white smokers. This unique social phenomenon was principally occasioned by the tobacco industry's manipulation of the burgeoning segregated urban black consumer market in cities at that time. According to Fast Company magazine, some large companies have started "outsourcing cool"—paying other "smaller, more-limber, closer-to-the-ground outsider" companies to help them keep up with customers' rapidly changing tastes and demands.

== In fashion ==
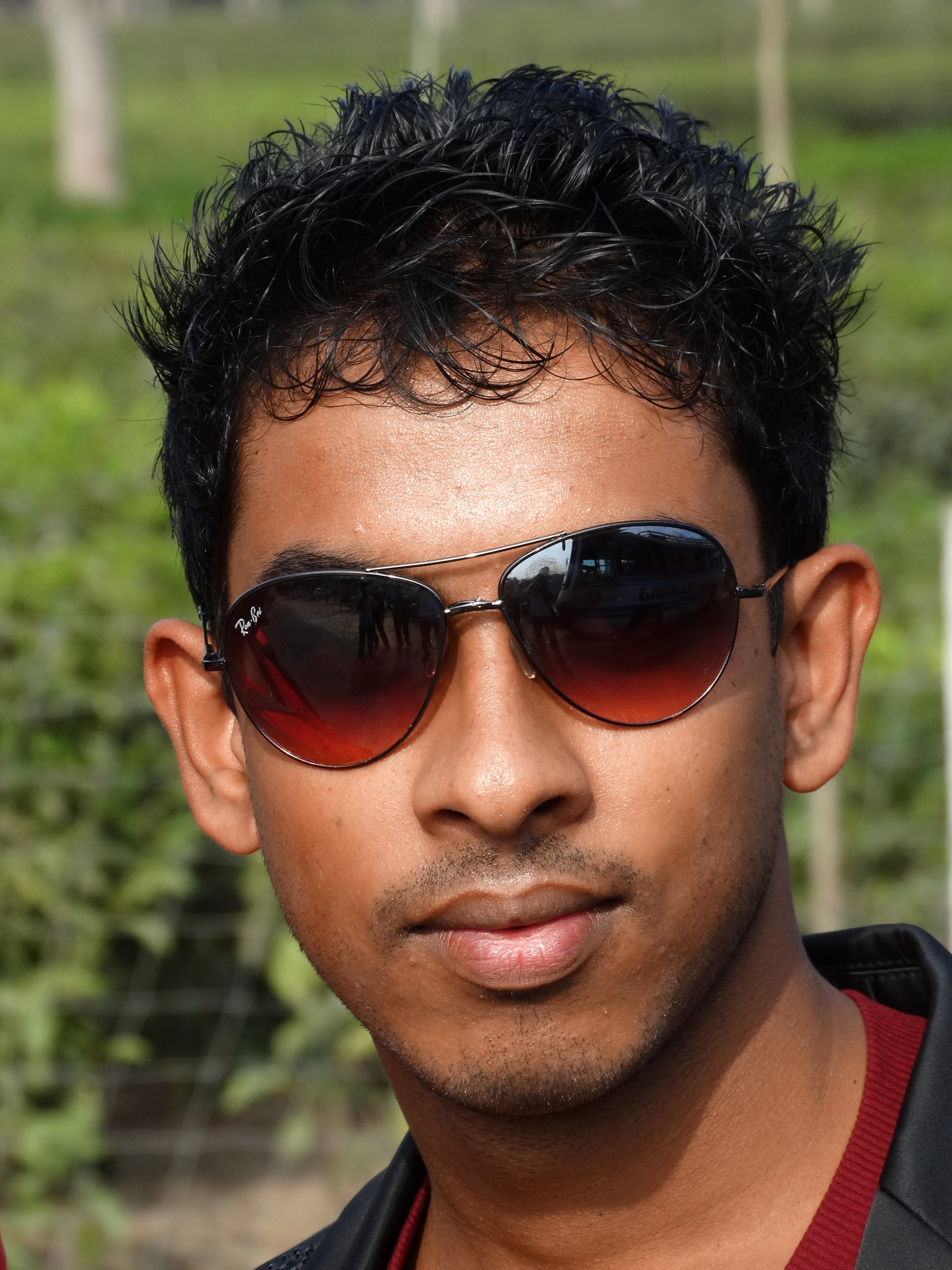
A Bengali man wearing sporting sunglasses, which fit the concept of cool in fashion

In terms of fashion, the concept of cool has transformed from the 1960s to the 1990s by becoming integrated in the dominant fabric of fashion culture. America's mass production of "ready-to-wear" fashion in the 1940s and 1950s established specific conventional outfits as markers of one's unchanging social role in society. Subcultures such as hippies felt repressed by the dominating conservative and conformist ideology of the 1940s and 1950s and rebelled. According to Dick Pountain's definition of cool, hippies' fashionable dress can be seen as cool because of its prominent deviation from the standard uniformity and mass production of clothing created by the "totalitarian" system of fashion. Hippie-inspired fashion included various styles featuring bold colors, such as the "Trippy Hippie," the "Fantasy Hippie," the "Retro Hippie", the "Ethnic Hippie", and the "Craft Hippie". Additionally, according to strain theory, the hand production of hippie fashion made their clothing cool all on its own. Handmade clothing passively rebelled against consumerism by allowing hippies to reject that lifestyle, which in turn made them cool. As a result of their disengagement with the establishment, the scope of self-critique was limited because their "mask" filtered negative thoughts of worthlessness, fostering the opportunity for self-worth.

Starting in the 1990s and continuing into the 21st century, the concept of dressing cool left the minority and entered the mainstream, making it a dominant ideology. Cool entered the mainstream as the hippie rebels of the late 1960s became the senior executives of business sectors, such as the fashion industry. Since they grew up with cool and maintained the same values, they knew its rules and thus knew how to accurately market and produce such clothing. However, once cool became the dominant ideology in the 21st century, its definition changed to not one of rebellion but of one attempting to hide their insecurities in a confident manner.

The grunge fashion style of the 1990s and 21st century allowed people who felt financially insecure about their lifestyle to pretend to "fit in" by wearing a unique piece of clothing, but one that was polished. For example, unlike the hippie style that clearly diverges from the norm, through Marc Jacobs' combined "fashion-grunge" style of "a little preppie, a little grunge and a little couture", he produces not only a bold statement, but one that is mysterious and awkward, creating an ambiguous perception of what the wearer's internal feelings are.

== See also ==
- African aesthetic
- Ataraxia
- Avant-garde
- Based
- Cool Britannia
- Cool jazz
- Fad
- Social norm
- Square (slang)
- Stoicism
