= The Marriage of the Virgin (Raphael) =

Painting by Raphael

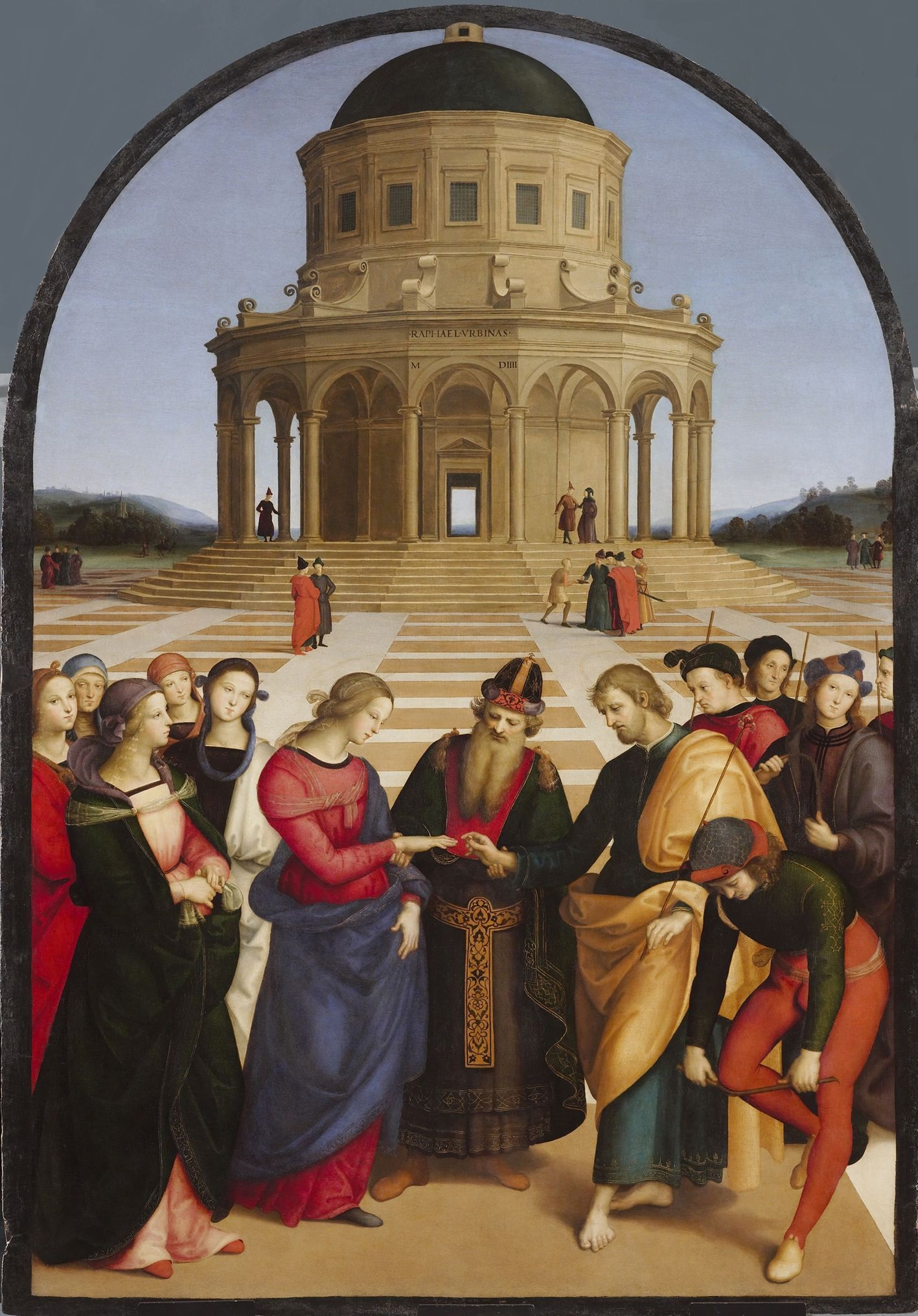
- Artist: Raphael
- Year: 1504
- Type: Oil on roundheaded panel
- Dimensions: 174 cm × 121 cm (69 in × 48 in)
- Location: Pinacoteca di Brera, Milan

The Marriage of the Virgin, also known as Lo Sposalizio, is an oil painting by the Italian High Renaissance artist Raphael. Completed in 1504 for the Franciscan church of San Francesco, Città di Castello, the painting depicts a marriage ceremony between Mary and Joseph. It changed hands several times before settling in 1806 at the Pinacoteca di Brera.

== History ==
In the later years of the 15th century, patrons in Citta di Castello sent three commissions to Raphael's teacher Pietro Perugino which, in Perugino's absence, were completed by Raphael. The Marriage of the Virgin, featuring the theme of the Marriage of the Virgin, was the last of these. Evidently inspired by one of Perugino's paintings, also known as Marriage of the Virgin, Raphael finished his own work, according to the date placed next to his signature, in 1504.

This particular work was commissioned by Filippo degli Albezzini for his family's side altar in the church of San Francesco. It remained in its original home until General Giuseppe Lechi led forces to Città di Castello to liberate it from Austrian occupation, when the painting was gifted to (or perhaps demanded by) the general. "Restoring Raphael" in the Cambridge Companion to Raphael (2005) reports that the painting remained with Lechi to his death in 1804, but Lechi died in 1836. The Cyclopedia of Painters and Paintings states rather that Lechi sold the piece in 1801 to one Giacomo Sannazaro, who himself sold the piece in 1804 to the Ospedale Maggiore in Milan. By whatever means it arrived there, it was in the possession of the hospital for a short time, as in 1806 the hospital sold it to the Italian state for 53,000 francs. It has since then been displayed in the Pinacoteca di Brera, in spite of an 1859 proposal to gift the painting to France after that country's army had entered Milan, and liberated them from Austrian occupation.

Through these various relocations, the painting was damaged. The panel had several cracks in the upper half, while there was rippling and bowing throughout. Italian artist Giuseppe Molteni, retained to repair it in November 1857, chose to preserve the panel rather than transfer the painting to canvas and spent months flattening the panel and hydrating it to overcome the damage of desiccation. This decision on the part of Molteni has permitted 20th-century art historians to use infrared reflectography to study the underdrawing beneath the completed art work. Molteni also undertook to clean the surface of the painting, which had been subjected to restoration before. He did not clean aggressively, as he wanted to be sure that elements of the original painting were preserved. The Cyclopedia of Painters and Paintings indicates that the painting is "somewhat discoloured."

== Analysis and influence ==
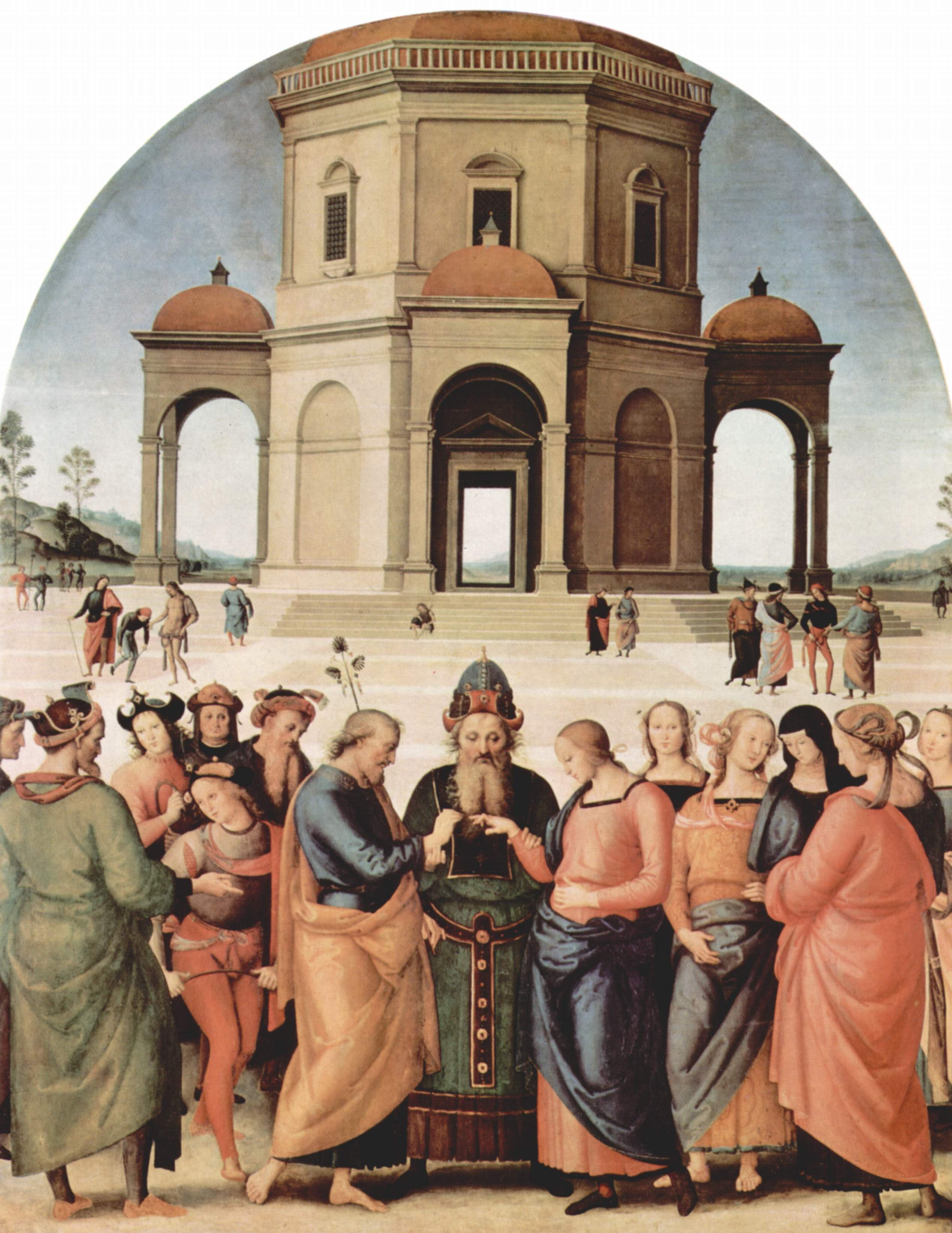
This version of the theme by Pietro Perugino is believed to have been Raphael's inspiration.

Several historians have disputed that Perugino's Marriage of the Virgin preceded Raphael's, and some have suggested the painting was not Perugino's at all but instead produced after Raphael's by one of Perugino's followers. However, a 16th century documentary evidence supports the conclusion that Perugino had begun working on the painting in 1499, though it was not completed until some point after December 26, 1503.

Although Raphael was heavily inspired by Perugino in painting the piece, differences between the two were remarked upon, within decades of the painting's completion, by 16th-century Italian artist and art biographer Giorgio Vasari, who said that in the piece "may be distinctly seen the progress of excellence of Raphael's style, which becomes much more subtle and refined, and surpasses the manner of Pietro. In this work," he continued, "there is a temple drawn in perspective with such evident care that it is marvellous to behold the difficulty of the problems which he has there set himself to solve."

It is very likely that the domed building in the background of both Perugino's and Raphael's work, which represents the Temple of Jerusalem, portrays the Temple as a Renaissance version of the Dome of the Rock.

Franz Liszt wrote a composition for solo piano based on Raphael's painting with the title "Sposalizio" in his Années de pèlerinage (Deuxième année: Italie).

== See also ==
- List of paintings by Raphael
- Sprezzatura
- The Marriage of the Virgin (Michelino da Besozzo)
