= San Francesco, Città di Castello =

Church building in Città di Castello, Italy

Coordinates: 43°27′31″N 12°14′24″E

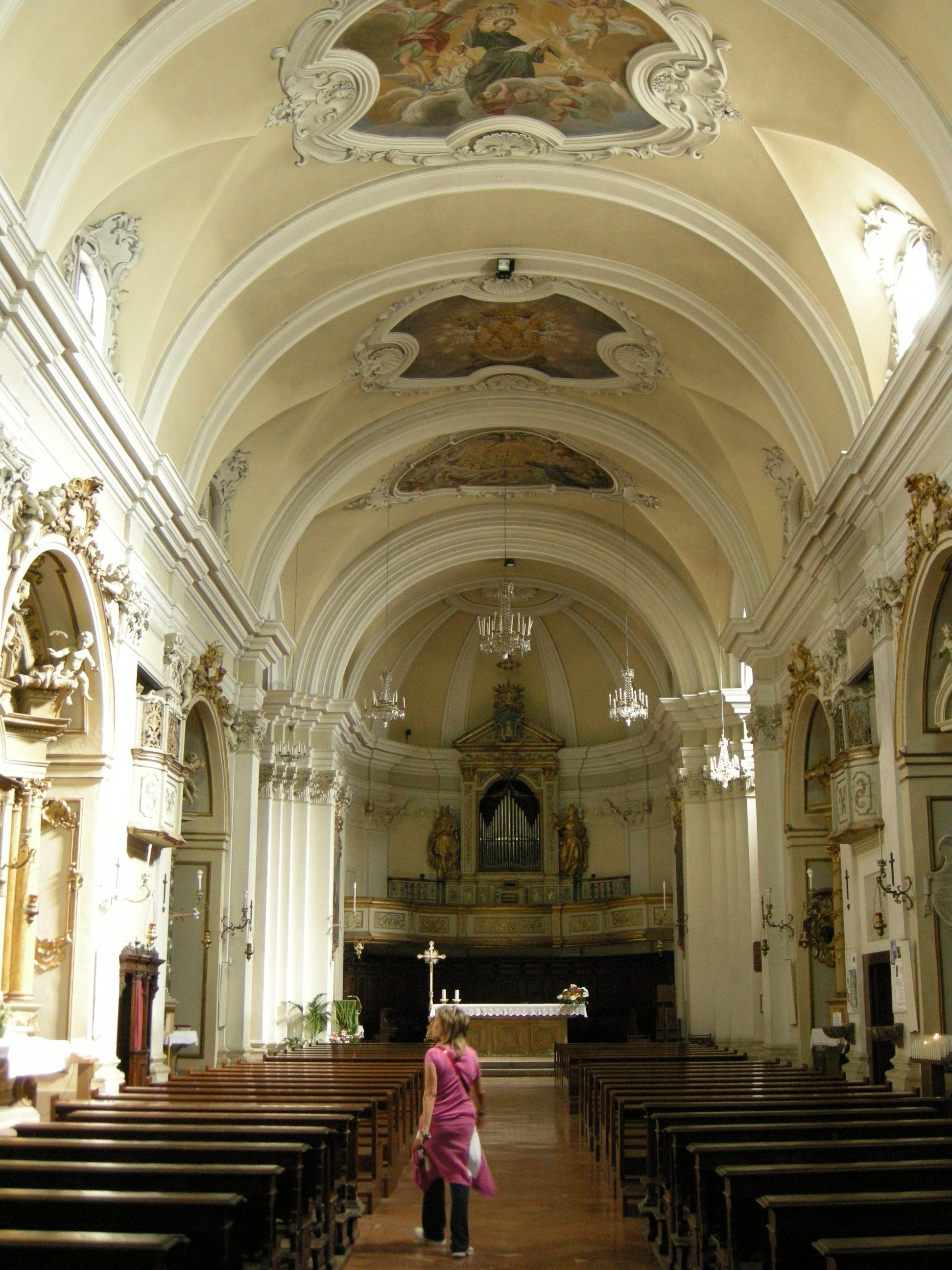
Castle city, san francesco, interior

San Francesco is a Roman Catholic church in Città di Castello, Province of Perugia, Umbria, Italy.

== History ==
A church at the site was consecrated in 1291, but has undergone centuries of reconstructions and enlargements. Few elements such as the apse, the right wall, and some windows date to the original Gothic architecture style church. A major reconstruction between 1707 and 1727 created the present Baroque architecture structure and interior decoration. The simple brick facade differs from the elaborately decorative interior. The stucco were completed Antonio Milli; the ceiling medallions were frescoed with Saints Francis, Anthony of Padua and Giuseppe da Copertino, by Lucantonio Angiolucci.

The Vitelli chapel on the left was designed (circa 1550) by Giorgio Vasari. He painted the large canvas depicting the Coronation of the Virgin (1563). The altar of St Joseph in the church has now a copy of the original Marriage of the Virgin (1504) by Raphael, stolen by Napoleonic troops in 1798, and now in the Pinacoteca di Brera. The 14th century carved altar is attributed to Franciscan Beato Giacomo. One of the chapels on the right once held a reliquary holding the arm of the apostle St Andrew, by Lorenzo Ghiberti, now in the local Pinacoteca Comunale of the city. Luca Signorelli's The Adoration of the Shepherds (1496); Raffaello del Colle's Presentation of Mary at the Temple; and Pomarancio's Burial of St Stephen was painted for this church, now also in the Pinacoteca.

A guide from 1878 inventoried in the church, works that included St Bernardino da Siena by Tommaso Conca; an Annunciation (1575) by Niccolò Pomarancio; another Annuciation with Apostles attributed to Raffaello del Colle; an Immaculate Conception attributed to Antonio Pomarancio; a Virgin with Saints Sebastian and Francis attributed to Pontormo; a Fall of St Paul by Virgilio Ducci; and a Coronation of the Virgin with Angels by Giorgio Vasari.
