= Sposalizio =

The painting which inspired this piece of music is also sometimes called the Sposalizio; for it, see Sposalizio (painting).

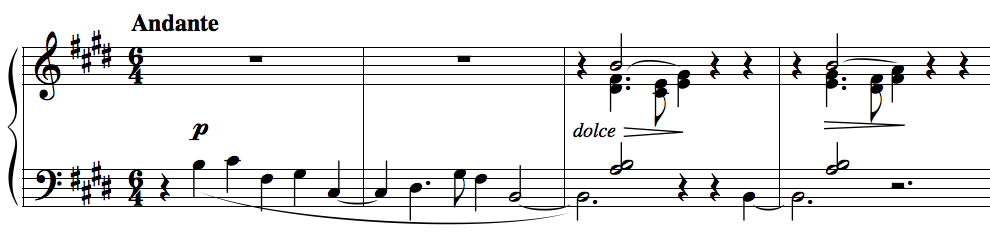
Introduction

Sposalizio is the title of the first piece in Franz Liszt's Deuxième Année de Pèlerinage: Italie (Second Year of Pilgrimage: Italy), published in 1858. The composition starts out with a simple pentatonic melody, described as a "bell-like motif", which transforms itself into a complex musical architecture. The melody then transforms itself into a type of wedding march, which continually embellishes itself to lead up to the grand climax, which contains crashing octaves into a loud finish. The composition ends quietly.

Liszt composed "Sposalizio", which translates as "Marriage", from Italian, after being inspired by Raphael's painting The Marriage of the Virgin. Most of the works contained in the Italy series of Années de Pèlerinage have titles derived from works of art with a connection to Italy.

Although the fast octaves can be somewhat challenging, the piece departs from the virtuosic fireworks that were trademarks of some of his earlier works.
