= Yoram Ish-Hurwitz =

Dutch pianist

- Born: 1968 (age 57–58); Amsterdam
- Genres: Classical
- Occupation: Pianist
- Instrument: Piano
- Years active: 1993 - Present
- Website: https://www.primoishhurwitz.com/music

Yoram Ish-Hurwitz (born 1968 in Amsterdam) is a Dutch pianist.

He began his studies with Danièle Dechenne and Jan Wijn at the Sweelinck Conservatorium in Amsterdam. In 1993 he was the first Dutch pianist to graduate from the Juilliard School in New York with the Hungarian pianist György Sándor. Finally he was admitted to the soloist class of the renowned piano teacher Karl-Heinz Kämmerling with whom he studied for another two years.

In 1988 he won the second prize at the Eduard Flipse Piano Competition in Rotterdam. Three years later he was awarded the Jacques Vonk Prize by a unanimous international jury. Since then he has frequently performed in The Netherlands, including many times in the Concertgebouw in Amsterdam. He is also a regular guest as soloist with many orchestras and has given recitals in Norway, Germany, Slovakia, Italy and the United Kingdom amongst other countries and has taken part in a large number of international festivals such as Bergen, Trondheim and Brighton.

His discography includes works by Franz Schubert, Frédéric Chopin, Modest Mussorgsky and Sergei Prokofiev, as well as the complete Années de Pèlerinage by Franz Liszt and the complete Iberia-suite by Isaac Albéniz. Since 2003 Yoram Ish-Hurwitz has been a Steinway Artist.
