= Glamour =

Impression of fascination created by an elegant or luxurious appearance

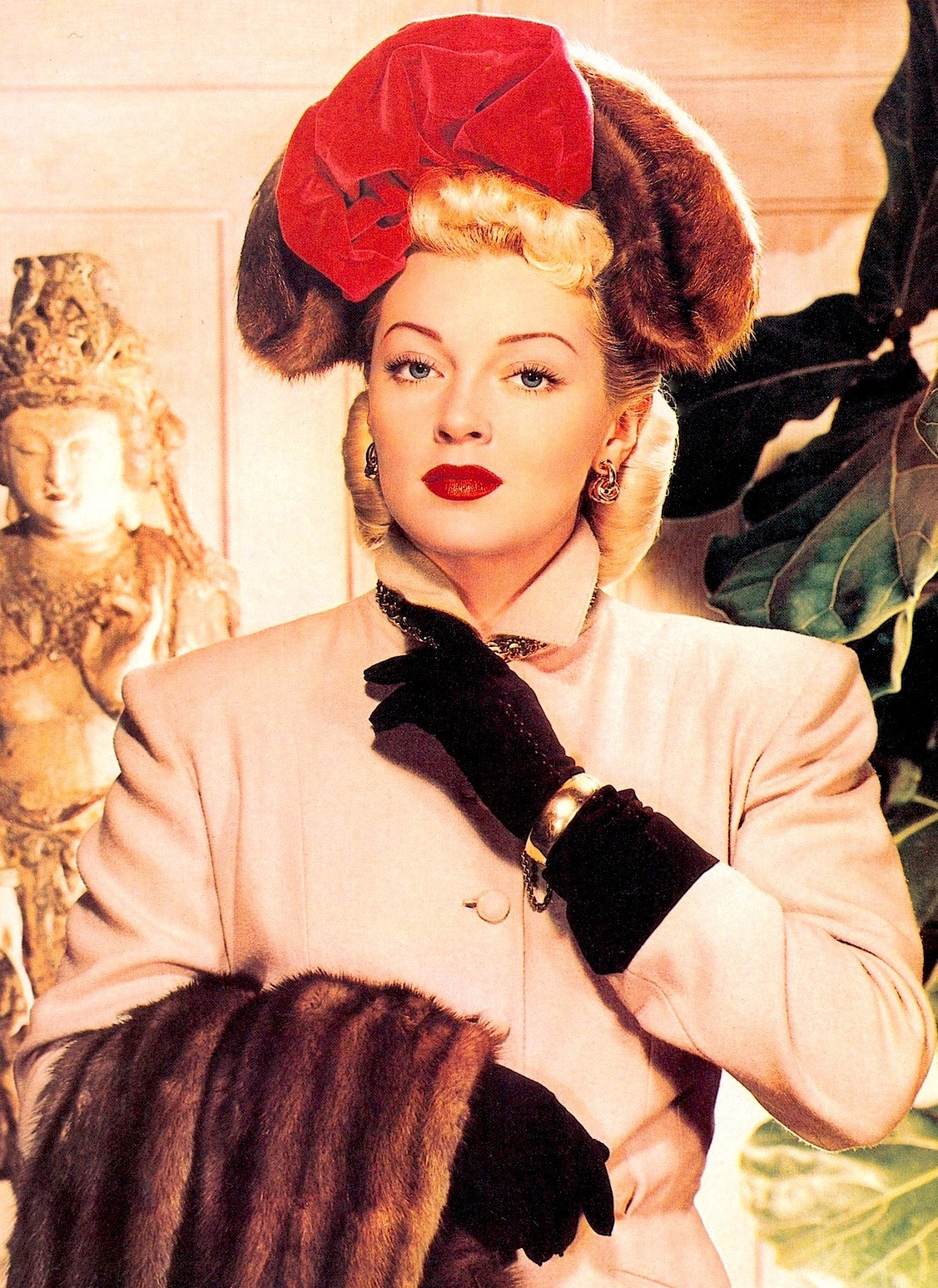
Lana Turner was considered to be a glamorous star.

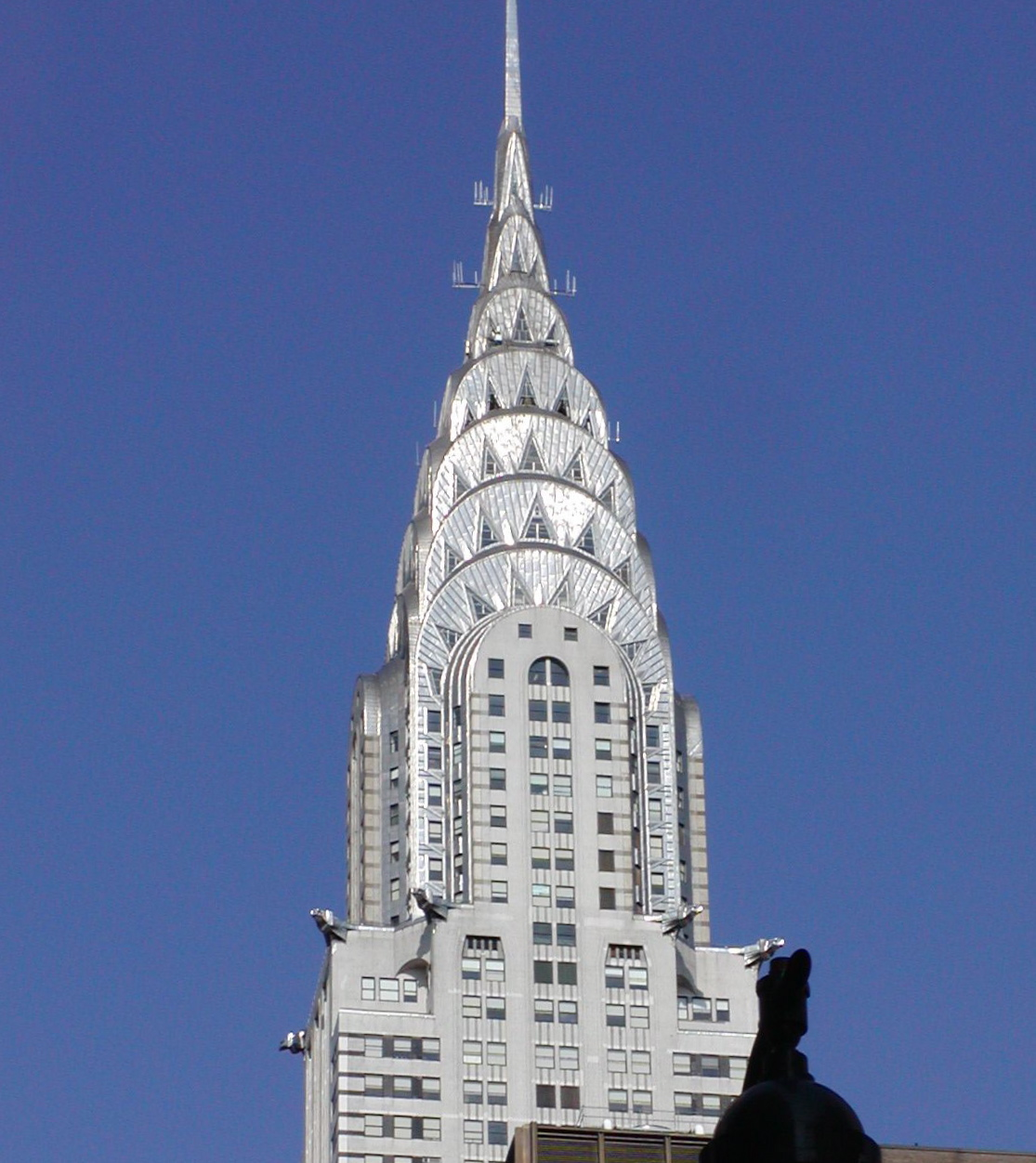
Art deco, as seen here on the Chrysler Building in Midtown Manhattan, is often characterised as glamorous.

In the field of cultural studies, glamour is the impression of attraction or fascination that a particularly luxurious or elegant appearance creates, an impression which intensifies reality. Usually, a person, event, location, technology, or product such as a piece of clothing can be glamorous or add glamour. "Glamour" originally referred to a magic spell, an illusion said to be cast by witches.

Virginia Postrel says that for glamour to be successful it nearly always requires sprezzatura—an appearance of effortlessness, and to appear distant—transcending the everyday, to be slightly mysterious and somewhat idealised, but not to the extent it is no longer possible to identify with the person. Glamorous things are neither opaque, hiding all, nor transparent showing everything, but translucent, favourably showing things.

The early Hollywood star system in particular specialised in Hollywood glamour where they systematically glamorised their actors and actresses.

Glamour can be confused with a style, which is adherence to a particular school of fashion, or intrinsic beauty; whereas glamour can be external and deliberate.

== History ==
Glamour originally referred to a magic spell, an enchantment said to be cast by witches. In the mid 19th century the word started to be used to describe a magical or fictitious form of beauty or allurement, and by the late 19th century, a non-magical item used to help create a more attractive appearance gradually became known as a glamour.

Later in the 19th century, the common meaning shifted to being applied to ordinary objects and jewellery without connotations of supernatural, merely upon the effect that it has on appearance. This is a sense used in this article and to some extent is the way that it was used by the early Hollywood system.

In modern usage glamour is often confused with style or female beauty; but they may be considered to be distinct, although glamour may give the appearance of beauty or present as a personal style.

== Design ==
Many forms of architecture employ glamorous motifs to enhance the appearance of what may be otherwise mundane buildings. The Art Deco style is generally considered to be a glamorous one.

== Cinema ==
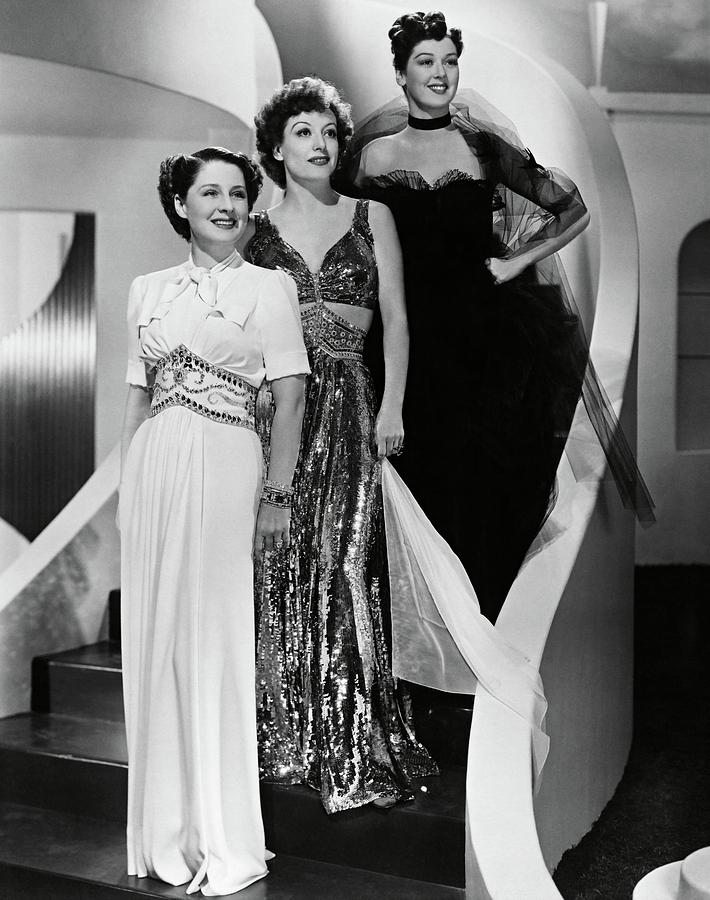
1930s fashion icons Norma Shearer, Joan Crawford and Rosalind Russell in The Women (1939), wearing nightgowns designed by Adrian.

The concept of glamour became ubiquitous in the 1930s, and the decade has been described as the "Golden Age of Glamour." The main driver of this phenomenon was the Hollywood film industry: as women around the world sought to integrate elements of movie stars into their personal styles, actresses such as Jean Harlow, Joan Crawford, Greta Garbo, Marlene Dietrich, and Bette Davis became the first style icons of the studio era, beginning to replace the traditional role of the upper classes as leading trendsetters. Studios promoted the idea that women could model their appearance after a star with comparable physical traits or personality, and pattern companies produced affordable versions of film costumes for public consumption. A paradigmatic example was the white cotton organdie gown designed by Adrian for Joan Crawford in Letty Lynton (1932), which generated thousands of copies at all price ranges, with Macy's alone reportedly selling millions.

The effects of the Great Depression solidified Hollywood's role in glamour, as studios reframed celebrity as a relatable yet heightened ideal, offering the public an escape from widespread poverty. The stars' attire—featuring costly materials, unique designs, and luxurious furs—conveyed associations with high society, European sophistication, and exclusivity, while their immense popularity enabled them to penetrate fashion magazines previously reserved for social elites. As filmmaker Josef von Sternberg observed of stars such as Marlene Dietrich, Carole Lombard, Rita Hayworth, and Dolores del Río: glamour was "the result of chiaroscuro, the play of light on the landscape of the face...the indecipherable magic of the cinema, substance of the dreams of a generation." Joan Crawford is quoted as having said: "I never go outside unless I look like Joan Crawford, the movie star."

The Hollywood studios' glamour reached its peak in 1930s fashion, but its influence extended into the 1940s. Photography was shot in rooms specially painted to flatter the skin tone of actors and actresses, with careful attention paid to hair and clothes. Notable beneficiaries of this system included Grace Kelly, Marilyn Monroe, and Doris Day in the postwar decades.

== Photography ==
Glamour photography is the photographing of a fashion model with the emphasis on the model and the model's sexuality and allure; with any clothing, fashion, products or environment contained in the image being of minor consideration. Photographers use a combination of cosmetics, lighting and airbrushing techniques to produce the most physically appealing image of the mode possible. For example in the April 1933 edition of Vanity Fair, George Hoyningen-Huene presented seven images of the same model, in several different manners under the title of "The Man Behind the Camera". Through the use of chiaroscuro lighting and props Hoyningen-Huene successfully created a collection of juxtaposing images that both accentuate and minimise the beauty and glamour of the model.

== Criticism and social impact ==
Glamour magazine has often been criticized for promoting unrealistic beauty standards, especially through the film, fashion, and advertising industries. These representations tend to idealise physical appearance and lifestyle, which can create pressure on individuals to conform to specific aesthetic norms. As a result, it is frequently linked with issues such as low self-esteem, body image concerns, and dissatisfaction with one’s natural appearance, particularly among younger audiences influenced by media portrayals.

In addition, glamour is closely associated with consumer culture, where luxury goods and stylish lifestyles are presented as symbols of success and happiness. Critics argue that this can encourage materialism and reinforce the idea that personal value is tied to appearance and possessions. With the rise of social media, these effects have become more widespread, as curated and edited images blur the line between reality and idealised presentation, further shaping how people perceive themselves and others.

== See also ==
- Beauty, attractiveness
- Celebutante, seeking and using fame for fame's sake
- Dandy, a low-class person wearing typical high-class clothing
- Diva, theatre, cinema and music stardom
- Elegance, simple grace and dignified propriety
- Glam rock, a type of music where the musicians used outrageous glamours such as platform shoes and outrageous hairstyles
- Glamour photography, photography which shows a model, often nude or seminude
- Sprezzatura, to appear as without effort
- Style, dressing according to a school of thought
