= Années de pèlerinage =

Set of piano compositions by Franz Liszt

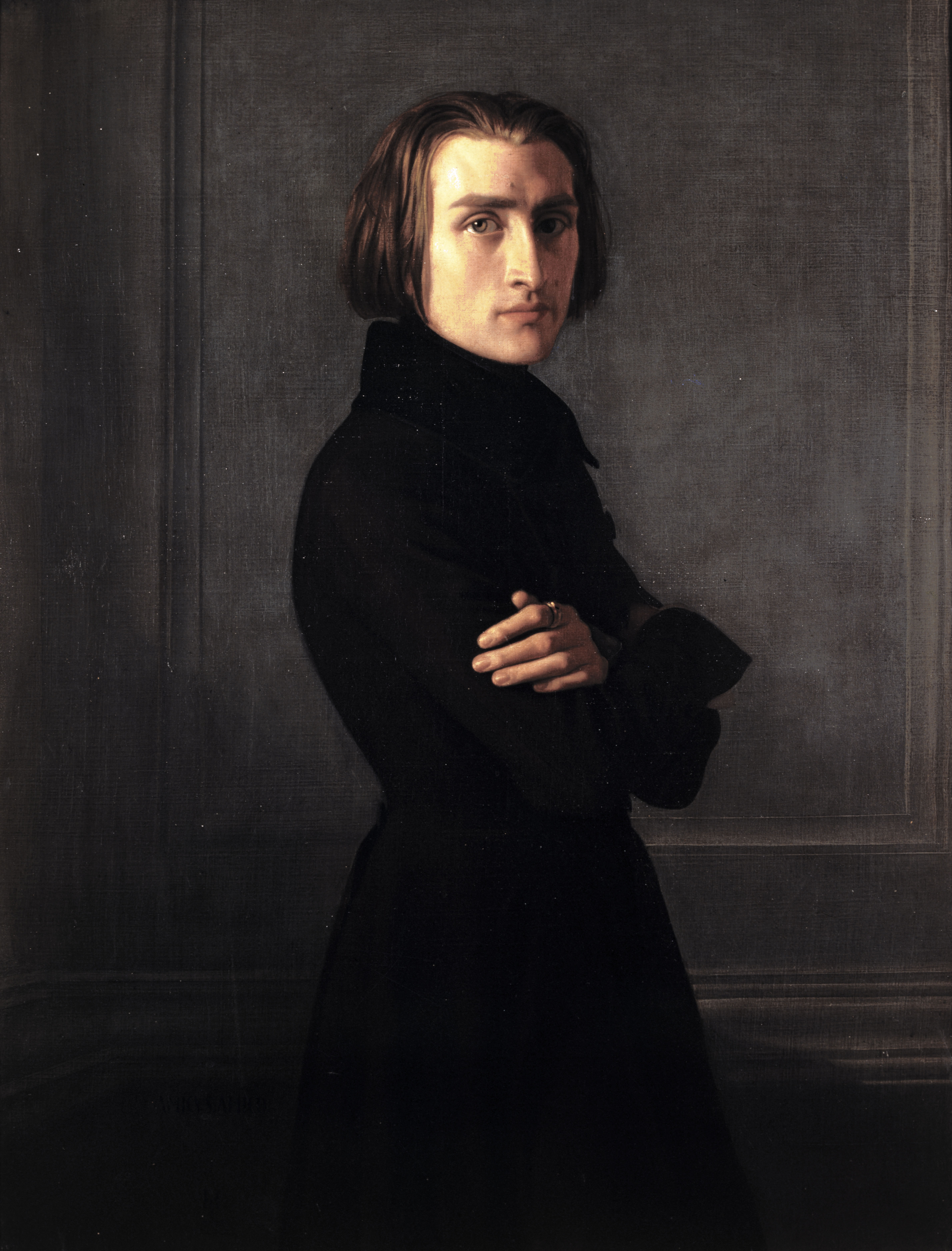
Portrait of Franz Liszt by Henri Lehmann, 1839

Années de pèlerinage (French for Years of Pilgrimage) (S.160, S.161, S.162, S.163) is a set of three suites for solo piano by Franz Liszt. Much of it (the first suite in particular) derives from an earlier work, Album d'un voyageur, his first major published piano cycle, which was composed between 1835 and 1838 and published in 1842. Années de pèlerinage is widely considered as the masterwork and summation of Liszt's musical style. While the first two offerings are often considered music of a young man, the third volume is notable as an example of his later style. Composed well after the first two volumes, it displays less virtuosity and more harmonic experimentation.

The title Années de pèlerinage refers to Goethe's famous novel of self-realization, Wilhelm Meister's Apprenticeship, and especially its sequel Wilhelm Meister's Journeyman Years (whose original title Wilhelm Meisters Wanderjahre meant Years of Wandering or Years of Pilgrimage, the latter being used for its first French translation). Liszt clearly places these compositions in line with the Romantic literature of his time, prefacing most pieces with a literary passage from writers such as Schiller, Byron or Senancour, and, in an introduction to the entire work, writing:

Having recently travelled to many new countries, through different settings and places consecrated by history and poetry; having felt that the phenomena of nature and their attendant sights did not pass before my eyes as pointless images but stirred deep emotions in my soul, and that between us a vague but immediate relationship had established itself, an undefined but real rapport, an inexplicable but undeniable communication, I have tried to portray in music a few of my strongest sensations and most lively impressions.

== Album d'un voyageur, S.156 ==
This original collection of 12 pieces was the immediate result of the infamous liaison with Countess Marie d'Agoult as well as the births of Liszt's three children. It stands as one of Liszt's most original contributions to the piano literarture, arguably even more so than its revised counterpart, the Première année.

== The three suites of Années de pèlerinage ==
=== Première année: Suisse ===
"Première année: Suisse" ("First Year: Switzerland"), S.160, was published in 1855. Composed between 1848 and 1854, most of the pieces (Nos. 1, 2, 3, 4, 6, 8 and 9) are revisions of Album d'un voyageur: Part 1: Impressions et Poesies and Part 2: Fleurs mélodiques des Alpes. "Au lac de Wallenstadt" (No. 2) and "Au bord d'une source" (No. 4) received only minor revisions, while "La Chapelle de Guillaume Tell" (No. 1), "Vallée d'Obermann" (No. 6), and especially "Les cloches de Genève" (No. 9) were more extensively rewritten. "Églogue" (No. 7) was published separately, and "Orage" (No. 5) was included as part of the definitive version of the cycle.

1. Chapelle de Guillaume Tell (William Tell's Chapel) in C major – For this depiction of the Swiss struggle for liberation Liszt chooses a motto from Schiller as caption, "All for one – one for all." A noble passage marked lento opens the piece, followed by the main melody of the freedom fighters. A horn call rouses the troops, echoes down the valleys, and mixes with the sound of the heroic struggle.
2. Au lac de Wallenstadt (At Lake Wallenstadt) in A♭ major – Liszt's caption is from Lord Byron's Childe Harold's Pilgrimage (Canto III, stanza 85): "Thy contrasted lake / With the wild world I dwell in is a thing / Which warns me, with its stillness, to forsake / Earth's troubled waters for a purer spring." In her Mémoires, Liszt's mistress and traveling companion of the time, Marie d'Agoult, recalls their time by Lake Wallenstadt, writing, "Franz wrote for me there a melancholy harmony, imitative of the sigh of the waves and the cadence of oars, which I have never been able to hear without weeping."
3. Pastorale in E major – This piece is a revision of the third from the second book of the earlier Album, with its central section removed in the process.
4. Au bord d'une source (Beside a Spring) in A♭ major – Liszt's caption is from Schiller: “In the whispering coolness begins young nature's play.”
5. Orage (Storm) in C minor – Liszt's caption is again from Byron's Childe Harold's Pilgrimage (Canto III, canto 96): "But where of ye, O tempests! is the goal? / Are ye like those within the human breast? / Or do ye find, at length, like eagles, some high nest?"
6. Vallée d'Obermann (Obermann's Valley) in E minor – Inspired by Étienne Pivert de Senancour's novel of the same title, set in Switzerland, with a hero overwhelmed and confused by nature, suffering from ennui and longing, finally concluding that only our feelings are true. The captions include one from Byron's succeeding canto 97, ("Could I embody and unbosom now / That which is most within me,--could I wreak / My thoughts upon expression, and thus throw / Soul--heart--mind--passions--feelings--strong or weak-- / All that I would have sought, and all I seek, / Bear, know, feel--and yet breathe--into one word, / And that one word were Lightning, I would speak; / But as it is, I live and die unheard, / With a most voiceless thought, sheathing it as a sword") and two from Senancour's Obermann, which include the crucial questions, “What do I want? Who am I? What do I ask of nature?"
7. Eglogue (Eclogue) in A♭ major – Liszt's caption is from the next canto of the Pilgrimage: "The morn is up again, the dewy morn, / With breath all incense, and with cheek all bloom, / Laughing the clouds away with playful scorn, / And living as if earth contained no tomb!"
8. Le mal du pays (Homesickness) in E minor –The work is prefaced by a quotation from the ‘Troisième fragment’ of Senancour’s Obermann: ‘De l’expression romantique, et du ranz des vaches’ (‘on Romantic expression, and the Swiss pastoral melody employed in the calling of the cows’)—‘Le romanesque séduit les imaginations vives et fleuries; le romantique suffit seul aux âmes profondes, la véritable sensibilité …’ (‘The Romanesque attracts those of lively and florid imagination; the Romantic satisfies only profound souls, real sensitivity …’).
9. Les cloches de Genève: Nocturne (The Bells of Geneva: Nocturne) in B major – Liszt's caption is from stanza 72, earlier in the Byron's Pilgrimage: “I live not in myself, but I become / Portion of that around me”.

=== Deuxième année: Italie ===
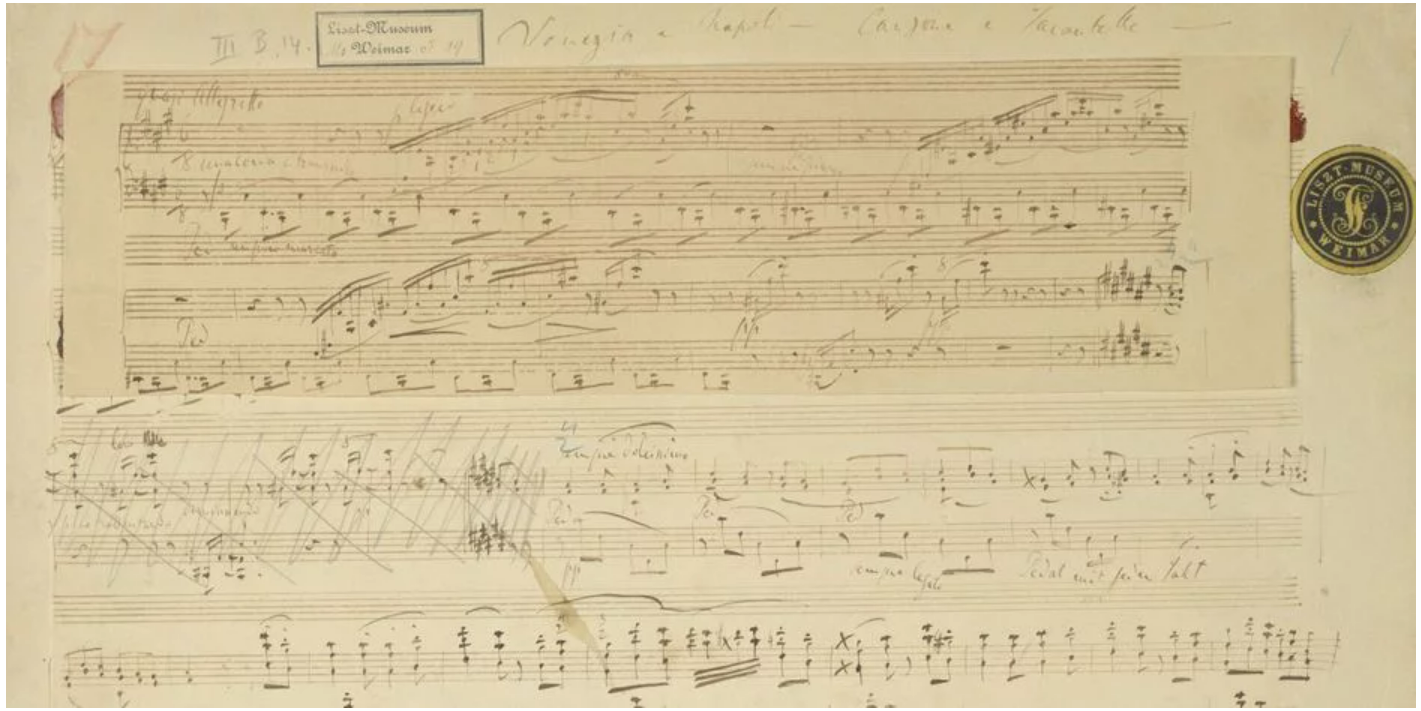
Autograph manuscript of the second version of "Venezia e Napoli"

Au bord d'une source (Beside a Spring)
Performed by Randolph Hokanson

Vallée d'Obermann (Obermann's Valley)

"Deuxième année: Italie" ("Second Year: Italy"), S.161, was composed between 1837 and 1849 and published in 1858 by Schott. Nos. 4 to 6 are revisions of Tre sonetti del Petrarca (Three sonnets of Petrarch), which was composed around 1839–1846 and published in 1846.

1. Sposalizio (Marriage of the Virgin, a painting by Raphael) in E major
2. Il penseroso (The Thinker, a statue by Michelangelo) in C♯ minor
3. Canzonetta del Salvator Rosa (Canzonetta of Salvator Rosa) in A major (Note: this song, "Vado ben spesso cangiando loco", was in fact written by Giovanni Bononcini)
4. Sonetto 47 del Petrarca (Petrarch's Sonnet 47) in D♭ major
5. Sonetto 104 del Petrarca (Petrarch's Sonnet 104) in E major
6. Sonetto 123 del Petrarca (Petrarch's Sonnet 123) in A♭ major
7. Après une lecture du Dante: Fantasia Quasi Sonata (After Reading Dante: Fantasia Quasi Sonata) in D minor
- Venezia e Napoli (Venice and Naples), S.162. Composed in 1859 as a partial revision of an earlier set with the same name composed around 1840. Published in 1861 as a supplement to the Second Year
1. Gondoliera (Gondolier's Song) in F♯ major – Based on the song "La biondina in gondoletta" by Giovanni Battista Peruchini.
2. Canzone (Canzone) in E♭ minor – Based on the gondolier's song "Nessun maggior dolore" from Rossini's Otello.
3. Tarantella (Tarantella) in G minor – Uses themes by Guillaume-Louis Cottrau (1797–1847).

=== Troisième année ===
"Troisième année" ("Third Year"), S.163, was published 1883. Nos. 1 to 4 and 7 were composed in 1877; No. 5 was composed in 1872; No. 6 was composed in 1867.

1. Angélus! Prière aux anges gardiens (Angelus! Prayer to the Guardian Angels) in E major – dedicated to Daniela von Bülow, Liszt's granddaughter, first daughter of Hans von Bülow and Cosima Liszt and wife of art historian Henry Thode. It was written for both melodeon, piano, or an instrument that combines both, for Liszt wrote "piano-melodium" on his manuscript
2. Aux cyprès de la Villa d'Este I: Thrénodie (To the Cypresses of the Villa d'Este I: Threnody) in G minor
3. Aux cyprès de la Villa d'Este II: Thrénodie (To the Cypresses of the Villa d'Este II: Threnody) in E minor – The Villa d'Este described in these two threnodies is in Tivoli, near Rome. It is famous for its beautiful cypresses and fountains
4. Les jeux d'eaux à la Villa d'Este (The Fountains of the Villa d'Este) in F♯ major – Over the music, Liszt placed the inscription, "Sed aqua quam ego dabo ei, fiet in eo fons aquae salientis in vitam aeternam" ("But the water that I shall give him shall become in him a well of water springing up into eternal life," from the Gospel of John). This piece, with its advanced harmonies and shimmering textures, is in many ways a precursor of musical Impressionism
5. Sunt lacrymae rerum/En mode hongrois (There are Tears for Things/In Hungarian Style) in A minor – Dedicated to Hans von Bülow.
6. Marche funèbre, En mémoire de Maximilien I, Empereur du Mexique (Funeral March, In memory of Emperor Maximilian of Mexico) in F minor
7. Sursum corda (Lift Up Your Hearts) in E major.

== Recordings ==
There have been numerous recordings made of the suites, in both complete and incomplete form.

| Year | Pianist | Section | Label and number |
|---|---|---|---|
| 1928, 1937, 1928 | Claudio Arrau | Incomplete | |
| 1936 | Béla Bartók | Sursum Corda (3e année) | Patria MrE 63; later Pacific 6301, etc. |
| 1947 | Vladimir Horowitz | Au bord d'une source (1ere année) | RCA Victor Red Seal |
| 1947 | Dinu Lipatti | Sonetto 104 del Petrarca (2e année) | EMI CZS 767163 2 |
| 1950 | Wilhelm Kempff | 3 pieces from 1ere année, 5 pieces from 2e année, 1 piece from Supplement | Decca / London, once issued on Great Pianists of the 20th Century |
| 1951 | Vladimir Horowitz | Sonetto 104 del Petrarca (2e année) | RCA Victor Red Seal |
| 1963 | Sergio Fiorentino | 1ere année: Suisse | Delta Record Co. Ltd. DEL 12032/SDEL 18032 |
| 1966 | Edith Farnadi | Complete | His Master's Voice in three different LPs; later in a Westminster box set |
| 1969 | Claudio Arrau | Incomplete | Philips Classics |
| 1973 | Jerome Rose | Complete | Vox CD3X 3004 |
| 1974 | Wilhelm Kempff | 2e année: Italie (minus Dante Sonata) & Gondoliera from Supplement | Deutsche Grammophon |
| 1975 | Vladimir Horowitz | Au bord d'une source (1ere année) | RCA Victor Red Seal 82876 50754 2 |
| 1977 | Lazar Berman | Complete | Deutsche Grammophon DGG 4372062 |
| 1977 | György Cziffra | Complete | EMI Connoisseur Society CSQ 2141, 2142, 2143 |
| 1980 | Alfred Brendel | 3e année: Italie (3 pieces: No. 2, No. 4, No. 5) | Philips Classics 9500 775 |
| 1986 | Zoltán Kocsis | 3e année: Italie | Philips Classics 462312-2 |
| 1986 | Alfred Brendel | 1ere année: Suisse | Philips Classics 462312-2 |
| 1986 | Alfred Brendel | 2e année: Italie | Philips Classics 462312-2 |
| 1986 | Tamás Vásáry | 2e année: Italie | BBC music Magazine |
| 1989, 1984, 1983 | Claudio Arrau | Incomplete | Philips Classics |
| 1989 | Jeffrey Swann | Complete | Akademia Records |
| 1989 | Roberto Poli | 2e année: Italie | OnClassical |
| 1990 | Jorge Bolet | 2e année: Italie | Decca / London ASIN: B00000E2MO |
| 1990 | Jorge Bolet | 1e année: Suisse | Decca / London ASIN: B00000E2MN |
| 1990 | Alan Marks | 2e année: Italie | Nimbus Records |
| 1991 | Louis Lortie | 2e année: Italie | Chandos Records |
| 1991 | Irène Polya | Incomplete | Hungaroton HCD 31517 |
| 1992 | Jenő Jandó | 1e année: Suisse | Naxos Records 8.550548 |
| 1992 | Jenő Jandó | 2e année: Italie | Naxos Records 8.550549 |
| 1992 | Jenő Jandó | 3e année | Naxos Records 8.550550 |
| 1996 | Pierre Goy | 1e année | Cantando |
| 1995, 1996, 1990 | Leslie Howard | Complete | Hyperion Records |
| 2001 | Carlo Maria Dominici | 3e année | Fabula Classica |
| 2001 | Frederic Chiu | 2e année: Italie, Supplement | Harmonia Mundi |
| 2001, 2003, 2005 | Ksenia Nosikova | Complete | Centaur Records |
| 2000, 2002 | Thomas Hitzlberger | 2e année | Cybele |
| 2003 | Aldo Ciccolini | Complete | EMI Classics 5851772 |
| 2003 | Yoram Ish-Hurwitz | 2e année: Italie | Turtle Records |
| 2004 | Yoram Ish-Hurwitz | 1ere année: Suisse | Turtle Records |
| 2004 | Yoram Ish-Hurwitz | 3e année | Turtle Records |
| 2004 | Nicholas Angelich | Complete | MIRARE |
| 2005 | Stephen Hough | 1ere année: Suisse | Hyperion Records |
| 2008 | Daniel Grimwood | Complete, without Supplement | sfz music SFZM0208 |
| 2010 | Louis Lortie | Complete | Chandos Records CHAN10662(2) |
| 2010 | Mūza Rubackytė | Complete | Lyrinx Records LYR 2216 |
| 2010 | Jerome Lowenthal | Complete | Bridge Records 9307A/C |
| 2008, 2009, 2010 | Michael Korstick | Complete | CPO 777 478-2 |
| 2010 | Tomas Dratva | 1ere année | Oehms Classics OC 786 |
| 2011 | Julian Gorus | Complete | Hänssler Classic 98.627 |
| 2011 | Alexander Krichel | 2e année: Italie | Telos Music |
| 2011 | Bertrand Chamayou | Complete | Naive |
| 2011 | Seung-Yeun Huh | Complete, without Supplement | Ars Musici 232406 |
| 2011 | Ragna Schirmer | Complete | Berlin Classics 0300121BC |
| 2012 | Sinae Lee | Complete | Nimbus Records N16202 |
| 2012 | Costantino Catena | Supplement | Camerata Tokyo CMCD-15133-4 |
| 2012 | Reiko Kuwahara | 1ere année: Suisse | Denmoukeikaku/DPIC Entertainment |
| 2013 | Alexei Grynyuk | Sonetti del Petrarca (2e année) | Orchid Classics ORC100031 |
| 2013 | Eisuke Nemoto | 2e année: Italie, Supplement | Denmoukeikaku/DPIC Entertainment |
| 2014 | Simone Jennarelli | 1e année: Suisse | |
| 2018 | Sophia Agranovich | 2e année: Italie S.161(3 Sonetti del Petrarca; Après une lecture du Dante: Fantasia quasi Sonata) | Centaur Records / Naxos, CRC 3601 |
| 2020 | Suzana Bartal | Complete | Naïve Records ASIN: B084QHPLZD |
| 2020 | Yunchan Lim | 2e année: Italie S.161 | Young Musicians of Korea Vol.3, Korea Broadcasting System Media |
| 2022 | Francesco Libetta | Complete, on Piano Borgato GrandPrix 333 | C&Co New Recording https://www.qobuz.com/dk-en/album/annees-de-pelerinage-francesco-libetta/ucxmlr1nuiyka |
| 2026 | Brian Hsu | Complete | Divine Art |

=== Video ===
- Alfred Brendel (Deutsche Grammophon) DVD

== Score ==
Edition Peters publishes the complete score, with the first volume of the trilogy, "Suisse", published together with the "Trois Morceaux suisses" for the first time, in line with the composer's original intention to combine all his Swiss-inspired character pieces into a single volume. The musical journey is supported by the inclusion of historical illustrations of the scenes and landscapes that inspired the composer. Edited by world-renowned Liszt expert and concert pianist Leslie Howard, the edition also contains Liszt's original fingerings.

Dover Publications has issued a complete edition in one bound volume. Also included is an appendix of related works including Lyon (from the first book of Album d'un voyageur), Apparitions, Tre sonetti del Petrarca, and the original version of Venezia e Napoli.

== In literature ==
Haruki Murakami's novel Colorless Tsukuru Tazaki and His Years of Pilgrimage (2013) centers on the movement "Le Mal du pays," and derives its title from the Années.
