= Antonio Circignani =

Italian painter (1560–1620)

- The Glory of the Eucharist with Sts. Blaise and Sebastian (1614), San Biagio, Montecatini Val di Cecina
- Born: 1560; Città della Pieve, Grand Duchy of Tuscany
- Died: 1630 (aged 69–70); Rome, Papal States
- Other name: Antonio Pomarancio
- Education: Niccolò Circignani
- Known for: Painting
- Movement: Mannerism; Baroque

Antonio Circignani, also known as Antonio Pomarancio (1560–1630), was an Italian painter of the late-Renaissance and early Baroque period.

== Biography ==
Born in Città della Pieve, he learned to paint from his father, Niccolò Circignani. Nevertheless, the influence of Federico Barocci and Cristoforo Roncalli is discernible in his work. In 1588, he moved to Rome with his father. He is first mentioned as an assistant to his father in 1589, during the execution of the frescoes in the Chapel of Saint Lawrence at the Valvisciolo Abbey, near Sermoneta. Shortly after the death of his father, the young artist started up his own workshop. The earliest work that can be definitively attributed to him is the cycle of frescoes depicting scenes from the Life of Christ in the 'Vignaroli' chapel in the church of Santa Maria della Consolazione in Rome (1598), which still show a strong influence from his father.

Circignani received a great many commissions from private individuals. Around 1600, he painted the frescoes on the vault of the first antechamber in the Palazzo Mattei di Giove, Rome. According to Cordaro, these frescoes show the influence of Giuseppe Cesari and the group of Roman artists who were moving beyond late Mannerism towards more classical and restrained forms, such as Passignano, Roncalli and the young Orazio Gentileschi. This stylistic shift is even more evident in the Chapel of Sant’Aniceto in the Palazzo Altemps, Rome, where Circignani painted scenes from the Life of Saint Anicetus on the walls and a cycle dedicated to the Virgin Mary in the presbyterium (1603). The cycle, centring on the scene of the decapitation of Pope Anicetus, was commissioned by Giovanni Angelo d'Altemps to commemorate the death of his father, Roberto, beheaded on the orders of Pope Sixtus V in 1585.

The most mature outcome of Circignani’s work is the cycle of frescoes The Life of St. Albert, adorning the Carmelite church of Santa Maria in Traspontina in Rome. Completed within the second decade of the 17th century, the decoration consists of an altarpiece of St. Albert and frescoes covering the walls, ceiling, and under-arch of the chapel depicting the saint's life, angels and prophets. This decoration reflects a transition from late Mannerism towards the dramatic tenebrism characteristic of Caravaggio's paintings.

Circignani was also active outside of Rome, in his native Umbria and in Florence, where several frescoes with scenes from the youth of Christ in the forecourt of the Hospital of Santa Maria Nuova (painted in 1614) give a rather favorable impression of his abilities. In Trevi, Umbria, Circignani frescoed the vault and walls of the Sala delle Arti (Hall of the Arts), on the piano nobile of Villa Fabri dei Boemi. At the centre of the vault is an allegorical figure of Religion, surrounded by a series of four panels depicting allegories of Military art (Arma), Literature (Litterae), Hunt (Venatio), and Marriage (Nuptiae). Circignani's most famous painting is probably his Immaculate Conception in San Francesco, Città di Castello. Circignani also worked in Narni, Terni, Amelia, Spoleto and Assisi, where his large canvas The Wedding of the Virgin adorns the Papal Basilica of Saint Mary of the Angels. Other works in central Italy include the Four Evangelists, in the Church of San Francesco, San Marino; and the Trinity, in the Church of the Santissima Trinità, Foiano della Chiana. Circignani died in Rome in 1630, aged 60. He was one of the artists featured in the Vite published by Giovanni Baglione. According to Baglione, Circignani was also a prolific engraver, but no engravings attributable with certainty to him have survived.

== Gallery ==
Supper at Emmaus, National Gallery of Denmark, Copenhagen

Jacob and Pharaoh, c. 1600, Palazzo Mattei di Giove, Rome

Adoration of the Magi, 1614, Hospital of Santa Maria Nuova, Florence

Mary's Visit to Elizabeth, fresco in the Chapel of Sant'Aniceto in Palazzo Altemps, Rome

Via Dolorosa, fresco in the Chapel of Sant'Aniceto in Palazzo Altemps, Rome

St. Pudentiana collects the blood of St. Anicetus into a jug, fresco in the Chapel of Sant'Aniceto in Palazzo Altemps, Rome

Allegory of the Hunt. Fresco in the Sala delle Arti, Villa Fabri dei Boemi, Trevi

Crucifixion, Montepulciano Cathedral

== Sources ==
- Hobbes, James R. (1849). Picture collector's manual adapted to the professional man, and the amateur. London: T&W Boone. p. 53.
- Baglione, Giovanni (1733) [1641]. Le Vite de' Pittori, Scultori, Architetti, ed Intagliatori dal Pontificato di Gregorio XII del 1572. fino a' tempi de Papa Urbano VIII. nel 1642 [Lives of the painters, sculptors, architects, and engravers during the papacies of Gregory XII in 1572 to Urban VIII in 1642]. Naples: Giovanni Battista Passari. p. 189.
- Cordaro, Michele (1981). "CIRCIGNANI, Antonio, detto il Pomarancio". Dizionario Biografico degli Italiani (in Italian). Vol. 25: Chinzer–Cirni. Rome: Institute of the Italian Encyclopaedia. ISBN 978-88-12-00032-6.
- Voss, Hermann (1997). Painting of the Late Renaissance in Rome and Florence. Vol. 2: The Diffusion and Transformation of Mannerism, 1520–1600. Translated by Susan Pelzel. San Francisco: Alan Wofsy Fine Arts. ISBN 978-1556602597.
- Ditchfield, Simon (2009). "Thinking with Saints: Sanctity and Society in the Early Modern World". Critical Inquiry. 35 (3): 552–584. doi:10.1086/598809.
- Nicolai, Fausto (2011). "Gli esordi romani di Antonio Pomarancio. Il contratto del 1598 per gli affreschi della cappella dei 'Vignaroli' in Santa Maria della Consolazione". Prospettiva. 141/142: 164–167. JSTOR 24435273.
