= Get down =

Action of historic African culture

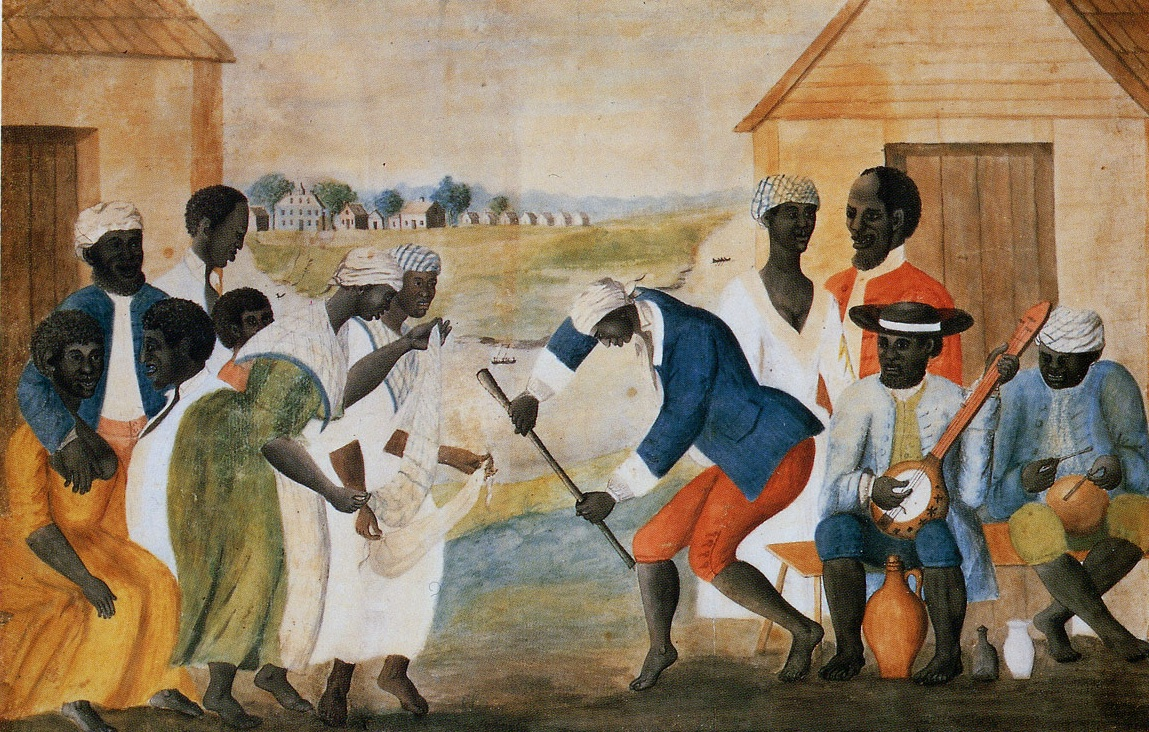
The Old Plantation, watercolor by an unknown artist

Get down is a stance, posture or movement in many traditional African cultures and throughout the African diaspora. It involves bending at the waist and knees, bringing the body low to the ground in moments of ecstasy or intensity. Bending at the knees and waist indicates suppleness and conveys qualities and values of vitality, youthfulness and energy.

In Gahu choreography, often dancers move counterclockwise in a circle of alternating men and women; their performance includes "long passages of a lightly bouncy basic 'step' leavened with brief 'get down' sections in which the dancers lower their center of weight and move with intensified strength and quickness."

The term "get down" in popular music and slang is directly related to this particular element of the African aesthetic, filtered through the African-American experience. Use of the term by white Americans since the middle-20th century, though, is credited to the influence of a white disc jockey, Bill "Hoss" Allen, who used it on his nightly soul music shows on Nashville, Tennessee station WLAC.
