= African aesthetic =

The African aesthetic encompasses shared principles of beauty, artistic expression, and visual culture that emerge across diverse African societies and communities. Despite the vast geographic scope of the African continent and the rich diversity of its peoples, scholars have identified common threads in how various African cultures approach art, design, and standards of visual appeal.

These shared aesthetic values manifest in artistic traditions, ceremonial practices, personal adornment, and architectural forms, creating what researchers have termed a coherent African aesthetic framework that transcends individual cultural boundaries while respecting local variations.

== Cool ==
In African Art in Motion, African art scholar and Yale professor Robert Farris Thompson turns his attention to cool in both the African and African-American contexts:

The mind of an elder within the body of the young is suggested by the striking African custom of dancing "hot" with a "cool" unsmiling face. This quality seems to have haunted Ten Rhyne at the Cape in 1673 and it struck the imagination of an early observer of strongly African-influenced dancing in Louisiana in the early nineteenth century, who noted "thumping ecstasy" and "intense solemnity of mien." The mask of the cool, or facial serenity, has been noted at many points in Afro-American history:

It is interesting that what remains a spiritual principle in some parts of Africa and the rare African-influenced portions of the modern U.S.A., such as tidewater Georgia, becomes in the mainline Afro-American urban culture an element of contemporary street behavior:

Negro boys…have a 'cool' way of walking in which the upper trunk and pelvis rock fore and aft while the head remains stable with the eyes looking straight ahead. The…walk is quite slow, and the Negroes take it as a way of 'strutting' or 'showing off'....

The cool style of male walking in the United States is called bopping ... Mystical coolness in Africa has changed in urban African-American assertions of independent power. But the functions, to heal and gather strength, partially remain. And the name cool [kule], remains. And the body is still played in two patterns, one stable, the other active, part energy and part mind.

== See also ==
- Get down
- Itutu
