= Sprezzatura =

Italian word

Portrait of Baldassare Castiglione by Raphael

Sprezzatura ([sprettsaˈtuːra]) is an Italian word that refers to a kind of effortless grace, the art of making something difficult look easy, or maintaining a nonchalant demeanor while performing complex tasks.

The term "sprezzatura" first appeared in Baldassare Castiglione's 1528 The Book of the Courtier, where it is defined by the author as "a certain nonchalance, so as to conceal all art and make whatever one does or says appear to be without effort and almost without any thought about it". It is the ability of the courtier to display "an easy facility in accomplishing difficult actions which hides the conscious effort that went into them". Sprezzatura has also been described "as a form of defensive irony: the ability to disguise what one really desires, feels, thinks, and means or intends behind a mask of apparent reticence and nonchalance".

The word has entered the English language; the Oxford English Dictionary defines it as "studied carelessness", especially as a characteristic quality or style of art or literature. It is also used in the aesthetic context, such as in fashion, where classical outfits can be purposefully worn in a way that seem a bit off, as if the pieces of clothing were put on while in a hurry.

== History ==
During his stay in Spain as Ambassador of the Holy See (1524–1529), and inspired by the Spanish court, Castiglione wrote The Book of the Courtier as a portrayal of an idealized courtier—one who could successfully keep the support of his ruler. Set in his native Duchy of Urbino, the book runs as several conversations held between courtiers of Guidobaldo da Montefeltro. The ideal courtier was supposed to be skilled in arms and in athletic events but be equally skilled in music and dancing. However, the courtier who had sprezzatura managed to make these difficult tasks look easy – and, more to the point, not appear calculating, a not-to-be-discounted asset in a milieu commonly informed by ambition, intrigue, etc. Concerning sprezzatura, Castiglione said:

I have found quite a universal rule which in this matter seems to me valid above all other, and in all human affairs whether in word or deed: and that is to avoid affectation in every way possible as though it were some rough and dangerous reef; and (to pronounce a new word perhaps) to practice in all things a certain sprezzatura [nonchalance], so as to conceal all art and make whatever is done or said appear to be without effort and almost without any thought about it.

Castiglione was generally an admirer of sprezzatura, and considered it an essential attribute in becoming the ideal courtier. In his view, this quality was inherent to the Spanish nobleman as opposed to the French nobleman, who he considered more 'presumptuous'.

== Positive and negative attributes ==
Sprezzatura was a vital quality for a courtier to have. According to Professor Wayne Rebhorn, courtiers essentially had to put on a performance for their peers and those who employed sprezzatura created the impression that they completely mastered the roles they played. In Rebhorn's opinion, a courtier's sprezzatura made him seem to be fully at ease in court and like someone who was "the total master of self, society's rules, and even physical laws, and [his sprezzatura created] the distinct impression that he [was] unable to err". Of its virtues, Castiglione wrote "The great virtue of sprezzatura is that it implies a greatness unseen, a potential implicit in its very subtleties and flaws, a strength held in reserve."

Howard Wescott and other scholars have also noted the negative aspects of making difficult tasks seem effortless, namely, that in practice, sprezzatura involved an ability to trick people convincingly. Wescott states that Sprezzatura was, in a way, "the art of acting deviously", an "art" that created a "self-fulfilling culture of suspicion" because courtiers had to be diligent in maintaining their façades. "The by-product of the courtier's performance is that the achievement of sprezzatura may require him to deny or disparage his nature". Consequently, courtiers who excelled at sprezzatura risked losing themselves to the façade they put on for their peers.

== Examples in Renaissance art ==
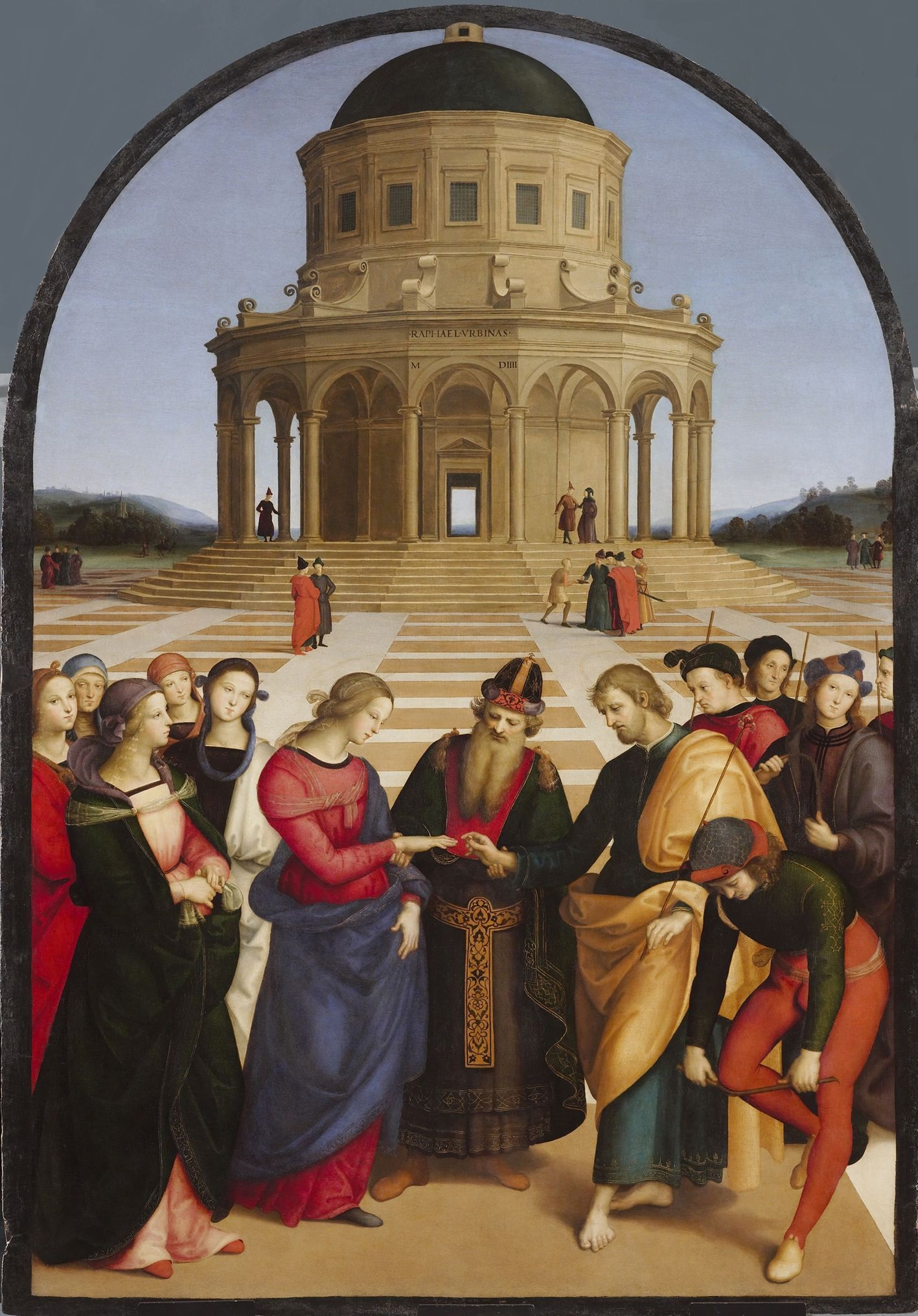
The Marriage of the Virgin (1504) by Raphael

Raphael as an artist exemplified sprezzatura from the beginning of his career, starting with his first signed work The Marriage of the Virgin. "Inspired by his teacher Perugino's rendering of the same subject, Raphael's painting can be found to differ primarily from its model by its unique awareness of the importance of sprezzatura."

Raphael's painting reveals its awareness of the importance of sprezzatura through his representation of Joseph. Compared to Raphael's more youthful representation of Joseph, Perugino's version of Joseph is considerably more idealized and older. Perugino's Joseph, despite his almost cloying sweetness in contrast to earlier depictions by other artists, retains a certain hardness of profile and angularity which Raphael has avoided by softening the anatomy of facial features and breaking the rigid profile ever so slightly.

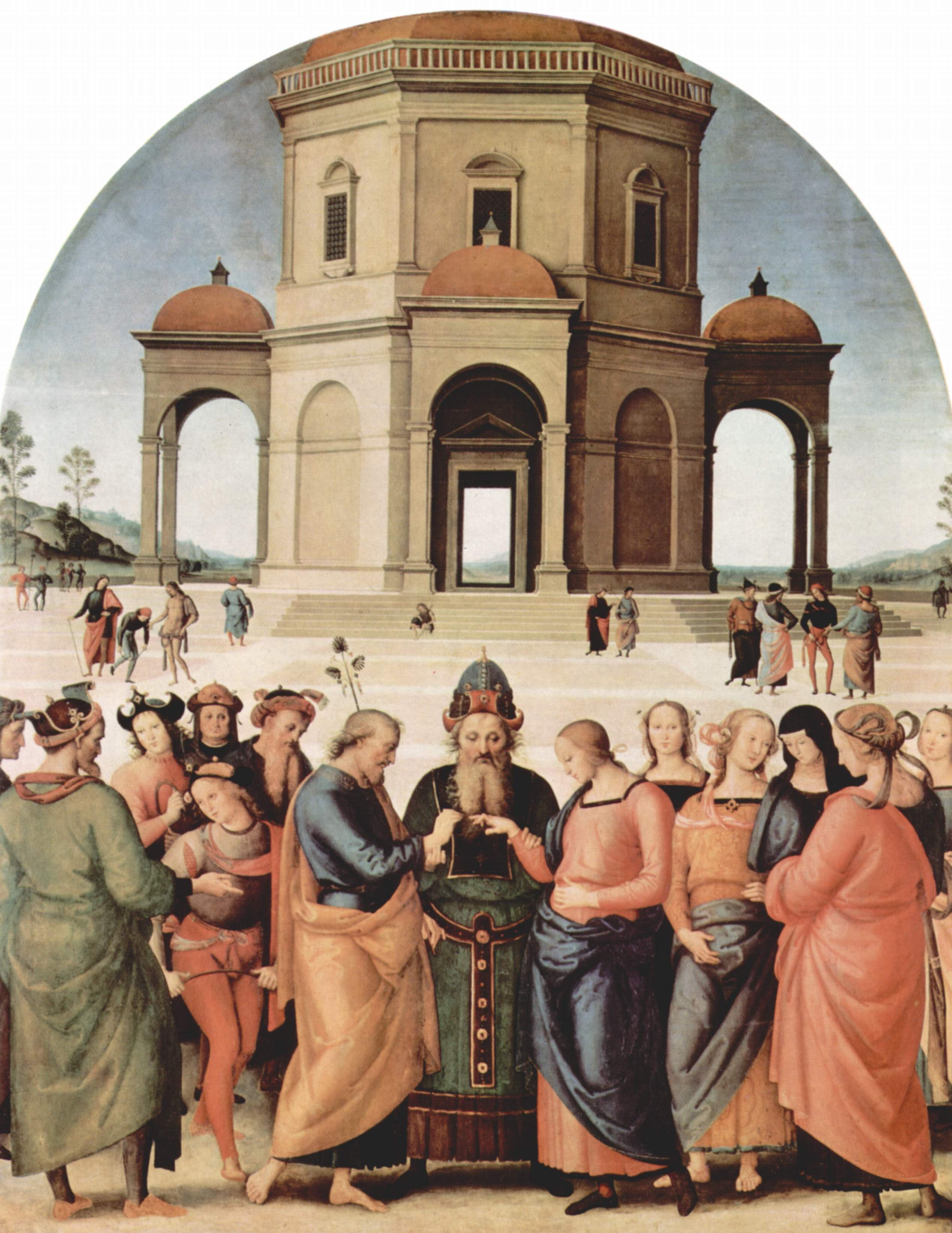
Marriage of the Virgin (1500–1504) by Perugino

Additionally, "the poses and garments of the two also reveal a subtle transformation which reflects the same deliberate alteration of attitude." For instance, the gracefulness of Perugino's Joseph is "emphasized by the highlighting of drapery and body. The easy S-like movement from ear to right toe is inescapably obvious." On the other hand, the grace displayed by Raphael's Joseph "is equally great but perhaps more affecting since the manner of its expression is less obvious."

Joseph's posture demonstrates an understated grace, since his slight turn toward the viewer tends to conceal the easy flow of line which characterizes the figure overall while he introduces any number of linear rhythms in the garment subordinate to the main movement of the figure. These variations, in addition to the deliberate avoidance of any dramatic highlights, help to explain why it is that we feel the "nonchalance" of Raphael's Joseph in contrast to the almost hieratic frozen grace of Perugino's. In the former we can detect that quality which Castiglione had in mind when he wrote: "Therefore we may call that art true art which does not seem to be art."

Sprezzatura is a major feature of Mannerist art and sculpture, particularly the bella maniera school, in which the artist synthesized the best attributes from various sources into a new design. Sprezzatura emphasized virtuosic effects that were displayed with apparent ease and facility. Cellini's Perseus would be an excellent example.

== See also ==
- Cool (aesthetics)
- Coquette flirtation, demure non-serious, polite, shy, playful or for amusement flirt
- Glamour, of which sprezzatura is said to be a necessary part
- Itutu, a similar Yoruba aesthetic
- Shibui, a similar Japanese aesthetic
- Wu wei, a similar Chinese aesthetic

== Bibliography ==
- Castiglione, Baldesar (1901). Eckstein Opdycke, Leonard (ed.). The Book of the Courtier: The Scribner's Sons Translation. Translated by Singleton, Charles S. New York: Charles Scribner's Sons.
- Castiglione, Baldesar (2002). Javitch, Daniel (ed.). The Book of the Courtier: The Singleton Translation. Translated by Singleton, Charles S. New York: W.W. Norton.
- Pugliese, Olga Zorza (2003). "The French Factor in Castiglione's "The Book of the Courtier (Il libro del cortegiano)": From the Manuscript Drafts to the Printed Edition". Renaissance and Reformation. 27 (2). University of Toronto: 23–40. doi:10.33137/rr.v39i2.8866. JSTOR 43445460.
- Rebhorn, Wayne A. (1978). Courtly Performances: Masking and Festivity in Castiglione's Book of the Courtier. Detroit: Wayne State University Press. ISBN 0814315879.
