= Colorless Tsukuru Tazaki and His Years of Pilgrimage =

2013 novel by Haruki Murakami

- First edition (Japanese)
- Author: Haruki Murakami
- Original title: 色彩を持たない多崎つくると、彼の巡礼の年 (Shikisai o motanai Tazaki Tsukuru to, kare no junrei no toshi) (Note: Its original title is romanized as "Shikisai o motanai Tazaki Tsukuru to, kare no junrei no toshi" (using Hepburn romanization), but is sometimes seen as "Shikisai wo motanai Tazaki Tsukuru to, kare no junrei no toshi" (using Nihon-shiki romanization, with wo instead of o). It bears "Tazaki Tsukuru" because Japanese names have the family name (Tazaki) come before the personal name (Tsukuru).)
- Translator: Philip Gabriel
- Cover artist: Morris Louis
- Language: Japanese
- Genre: Bildungsroman
- Published: 2013 (JP, Bungeishunjū); 2014 (US, Knopf); 2014 (UK, Harvill Secker); 2015 (MY, Fixi)
- Publication place: Japan
- Media type: Print (hardcover)
- Pages: 370 (JP); 386 (US); 298 (UK)
- ISBN: 978-4-16-382110-8 (JP); 978-0-385-35210-9 (US); 978-1-84655-833-7 (UK)

Colorless Tsukuru Tazaki and His Years of Pilgrimage (Japanese: 色彩を持たない多崎つくると、彼の巡礼の年, Hepburn: Shikisai o motanai Tazaki Tsukuru to, kare no junrei no toshi) is the thirteenth (Note: Press reports calling it his 14th novel were not accurate: Colorless Tsukuru Tazaki is Murakami's 13th novel (counting from his 1st Hear the Wind Sing to his 12th 1Q84).) novel by Japanese writer Haruki Murakami. Published on 12 April 2013 in Japan, it sold one million (Note: Press reports claiming that "1 million copies vanished from bookstores throughout Japan the day it went on sale" or that "the novel sold over one million copies its first week in Japan" were not accurate: one week after release, the publisher only reported one million copies printed (not sold). One month after release, the publisher claimed one million copies sold during that month. Nine months after release, point-of-sale information firm Oricon certified 985,000 copies sold.) copies in one month.

The novel is a Bildungsroman that tells the story of Japanese railroad engineer Tsukuru Tazaki. When his close-knit group of friends abruptly cuts all relationships with him, a young Tsukuru is left depressed and without answers. Years later, Tsukuru attempts to reconcile with his old friends, embarking on a quest for truth and a pilgrimage for happiness.

The English-language edition, translated by Philip Gabriel, was released worldwide on 12 August 2014. It topped the US bestsellers list of BookScan, NPR, and The New York Times in the "Hardcover Fiction" category.

== Plot ==
Tsukuru Tazaki is a 36-year-old man whose defining features are his love of train stations and that his childhood friends collectively decided to end their friendship with him during his second year at university. He now lives in Tokyo and has started seeing a new girlfriend, Sara Kimoto, who works at a travel agency. As he explains to her over dinner, back in Nagoya his high-school friends were called Ao, Aka, Shiro, and Kuro (Japanese for Blue, Red, White, and Black), nicknamed after a color in their surname, unlike his "colorless" one. They used to do everything together like the five digits of a hand. One day, he received a phone call from his friends where they announced that they no longer wanted to see him or be associated with him, leaving him emotionally crushed.

After he overcame that loss and his suicidal impulses, Tsukuru befriended Haida (whose name contains "Gray") at university. They started doing everything together and listened to classical music such as Franz Liszt's Années de pèlerinage. One evening, Haida told him a strange story about his father: when he was a college student, he took a leave from his studies and worked in a secluded hot-springs inn where he met a man who called himself Midorikawa (whose name contains "Green"), a jazz pianist from Tokyo who was incredibly talented. Midorikawa also told Haida's father a strange story about himself: One month previously, he had willingly accepted a "death token" condemning him to die two months later unless he could pass it on to another volunteer, but despite his talent, he was tired of his life. This near-death experience opened for him "the doors of perception", making his last weeks more wonderful than the decades he was giving up, and it also made him able to see people's color auras. During these tales, Tsukuru sometimes felt a sort of confusion between himself, Haida, Haida's father, and Midorikawa. Later that night, while Haida slept over on his couch, Tsukuru had a strange erotic dream involving both Shiro and Kuro, who then merged and morphed into Haida before the climax. Tsukuru wondered for himself whether it was all a dream, then Haida didn't show up for the following semester. All he left behind was the boxed set of Years of Pilgrimage he had lent Tsukuru.

Sara states that if he wants to progress in his current relationship, he needs to find out what happened to move on emotionally. Since Tsukuru doesn't use the Internet, she agrees to help him start on his journey of closure. After using Google and Facebook to locate these former friends, she updates Tsukuru on their current whereabouts and even arranges for his travel tickets.

Tsukuru first travels to his hometown of Nagoya and meets Ao, the former football jock who is now a successful Lexus dealer. From an apologetic Ao, he learns that Shiro had accused Tsukuru of rape, prompting all communications between the friends to cease. Shiro eventually became a successful piano teacher, but six years ago she was found strangled in an unsolved murder case. The next day, Tsukuru arranges to meet Aka, now a corporate trainer. A successful but deeply unhappy man, Aka tells Tsukuru that Shiro's story did not stack up at the time, and that Shiro seemed to have lost her love for life long before she died. Aka himself has issues, having belatedly realized after a failed marriage that he is gay, and feeling rejection from the people of Nagoya, including Ao, who dislike his somewhat shady business, which uses some psychological methods used by the Nazis. Tsukuru reassures Aka that he still cares for him, and departs.

Back at work in Tokyo, Tsukuru and his colleague Sakamoto visit a stationmaster whose strange tale reminds him of Haida's story. After discussing his findings with Sara over dinner, Tsukuru decides that he has to know the rest of the story. To do so he must visit the only other surviving member of the friendship group, Kuro, who now lives in Finland with two daughters. While preparing for the visit, Tsukuru goes to buy presents for Kuro's children and sees Sara hand in hand with a middle-aged man, smiling in a way she never did with Tsukuru. Filled not with jealousy but with sadness, Tsukuru flies to Finland. In Helsinki, he enlists Sara's friend Olga to help him track down Kuro for an unannounced visit. The next day he drives in Hämeenlinna, the rural town where Kuro has a holiday cottage. He first meets Kuro's husband, potter Edvard Haatainen. When Kuro arrives with her daughters, Edvard takes the latter to do some shopping.

Tsukuru stays alone with Kuro, now a successful ceramacist. Eri prefers to dispense with nicknames and explains that Shiro was mentally ill. The rape accusation was a fabrication, but he was cut off as a way of not frontally contradicting Shiro to enable her to deal with her problems. Eri reveals that she was in love with Tsukuru, which could have played a role in the accusation, but also that Shiro was actually raped and had a miscarriage, then developed anorexia as a way of never being pregnant again. Eri told him nothing, feeling somewhat rejected for him never noticing her true feelings for her, but mostly to prevent a confrontation with Shiro. Tsukuru was sacrificed to protect Shiro because the group believed he was the strongest emotionally and could deal with the ban. These redemptive revelations give the lie to Tsukuru's own perception of himself as plain and colorless.

Tsukuru returns home a wiser man. He wonders whether Shiro had turned against him, as he was the one who first left the group of five friends, as a preemptive strike because she could not bear the thought that its members would inevitably drift apart anyway. Against Kuro's advice, he decides to press Sara on whether she is seeing someone else. Sara says she will need three days to reply. After a late-night confession of love by phone call, the novel ends with Tsukuru still waiting.

== Characters ==
Tsukuru Tazaki
Tsukuru Tazaki (多崎 つくる (written 多崎 作 in the family register), Tazaki Tsukuru) The protagonist, his given name is a homophone for "To make or build" and his family name doesn't contain any color symbol. The character's current age is 36. Single. Liked train stations since childhood, and now makes a living designing train stations at a railway company in Tokyo.

Eri Kurono Haatainen
Eri Kurono (黒埜 恵里, Kurono Eri) She was a high-school friend of Tsukuru, and nicknamed Kuro or "Black" (her family name means "Black Meadow" (Note: Kurono means "Black Meadow" or "Black Field", from kuro (黒; "black, dark") and no (埜; "meadow, dry field"). And Haida means "Gray Paddy" or "Gray Field", from hai (灰; "gray, ash") and da (田; "paddy, wet field"). Explaining them as "Black Field" and "Gray Field" would hide the original difference between dry and wet fields.)). Now a pottery artist, she married Edvard Haatainen, a Finn who came to Japan to learn pottery, then she moved to live in Finland as Eri Kurono Haatainen (エリ・クロノ・ハアタイネン) and now has two daughters.

Yuzuki Shirane
Yuzuki Shirane (白根 柚木, Shirane Yuzuki) She was a high-school friend of Tsukuru, and nicknamed Shiro or "White" (her family name means "White Root"). She became a private piano teacher and lived in Hamamatsu, before being strangled to death in an unsolved murder six years ago.

Kei Akamatsu
Kei Akamatsu (赤松 慶, Akamatsu Kei) He was a high-school friend of Tsukuru, and nicknamed Aka or "Red" (his family name means "Red Pine"). Now a seminar seller still in Nagoya, he has a successful business that offers employee training to big companies in the area. A closet homosexual, he feels stifled in Nagoya.

Yoshio Oumi
Yoshio Oumi (青海 悦夫, Oumi Yoshio) He was a high-school friend of Tsukuru, and nicknamed Ao (Note: The color ao (青; "blue, blue-green") is often pronounced ou in names, hence this surname's romanization being "Oumi" instead of "Aomi".) or "Blue" (his family name means "Blue Sea"). Now a car dealer still in Nagoya, he sells Toyota's luxury car Lexus.

Sara Kimoto
Sara Kimoto (木元 沙羅, Kimoto Sara) Tsukuru's current love interest, her given name means "sal tree" and her family name "Under the tree" (or "tree base" as a non-name). Two years older than Tsukuru, she lives in Tokyo and works for a travel agency.

Fumiaki Haida
Fumiaki Haida (灰田 文紹, Haida Fumiaki) Tsukuru's only meaningful friend from college, his family name means "Gray Paddy". Two years younger than Tsukuru, he disappeared from the university before the beginning of the new semester.

Haida's father
Haida's father was a college teacher. In the 1960s, he took a leave of absence from school to travel Japan and worked odd jobs. While being employed as handyman at a small hot-springs inn, he met Midorikawa, whose strange tale he later told his son.

Midorikawa
Midorikawa (緑川) A jazz pianist from Tokyo, his family name means "Green River". According to the tale of Haida's father, he only played after placing a small bag on the piano, carried a deadly burden, and could see the color aura of people.

The stationmaster
He explains to Tsukuru that a lot of strange things are lost and found in his train station. One was a formaldehyde jar containing two severed sixth fingers.

Sakamoto
A young coworker of Tsukuru. Despite his job, his other passion is genetics.

Olga
A younger friend and colleague of Sara. An energetic Finn who works in a Helsinki travel agency. She helps Tsukuru in Finland.

Edvard Haatainen
The husband of Eri. A Finnish pottery artist. Tsukuru meets him while his wife and children are away.

The two daughters of Eri and Edvard
About 3 and 6 years old. The oldest one was named Yuzu in memory of Eri's deceased friend.

== Publishing history ==
=== Original publication ===
Prepublication

On 16 February 2013, the publishing company Bungeishunjū announced that Haruki Murakami's new novel was to be published in April. On 15 March, the title "Colorless Tsukuru Tazaki and His Years of Pilgrimage" and the release date of 12 April were disclosed.

Preorders were placed starting that day, and the sales reached 10 thousand copies on Amazon.co.jp within 11 days. It took one day fewer than its predecessor, 1Q84, to become the fastest selling book on Amazon.co.jp. The publisher prepared 300,000 copies, the largest number of first edition copies of a hardcover book in the company's history. Furthermore, the number of copies to be printed over the course of three more print runs before the release date was expected to reach 450,000 copies.

Prior to the book's release, statements such as Haruki Murakami's messages on 28 February and 15 March, were issued to convey fragments of information over the course of seven statements. However, details of the novel were not disclosed. Furthermore, galleys, usually given to other reviewers, newspapers, and bookstores before the publication, were not created. The knowledge of the content of the book was limited to a small number of people.

Post-publication

With the book's release date announced to be at midnight on Friday 12 April 2013, late-night bookstores in metropolitan Tokyo which were to start selling the book at 0:00 a.m. witnessed long lines of more than 150 people. Seven days after the release, the book had been printed 8 times for a total of over one million copies in print, reportedly sold during the following month. In November, point-of-sale information firm Oricon certified 985,000 copies sold.

=== English publication ===
Prepublication

In the two months before release, dozens of advance reviews were published (online or in print), ranging chronologically from Kirkus (15 June online, 1 July in print) to The Observer (27 and 28 July) to The New York Times (5 and 10 August) to The Australian (9 August) to The Japan Times (9 and 10 August), among others (details in External links, § Press reviews).

Chapter 5 of the translated novel appeared as the standalone "Haida's Story" on 27 July 2014 at Slate.

Post-publication

The English translation was released worldwide on Tuesday 12 August 2014 in all formats (print, digital, audio). As in Japan the year before, some bookstores held UK "midnight launches" and US "midnight parties" in the last hours of Monday 11 August 2014. They could thus sell the new book at 0:01 a.m. to pre-order customers ranging from dozens to hundreds, lined in the streets or gathered at evening events (such as film projections, quiz games, raffles, or karaoke contests); other stores chose early openings with free coffee at 8 a.m.; in Australia and New Zealand, an online competition in the preceding weeks offered to win a $3000 travel voucher (to go on a "pilgrimage" of one's own).

The book topped several US bestsellers lists from its first week in the "Hardcover Fiction" category, including:

- on BookScan's Top 10, staying four weeks (#1 the first week, then #2, #3, and #10)
- on NPR's Top 15, staying at least eighteen weeks (#1 the first three weeks, then #3 two weeks, #4 four weeks, #5, #6, #11, #14 two weeks, #15, unlisted three weeks, #14, #13, #11, as of 11 January 2015)
- on The New York Times's Top 20, staying eight weeks (#1 the first two weeks, then #2, #6, #10, #16, #14, and #18)

Murakami supported the launch with two public appearances in the UK (his firsts since 2003): an open talk and signing on 23 and 24 August 2014 at the Edinburgh International Book Festival in Scotland, and a signing on 30 August at a Piccadilly bookstore in London.

== Reception ==
Kirkus Reviews included the novel in its list of best books of 2014, describing it as "Another tour de force from Japan’s greatest living novelist."

In the review of the novel for The New York Times, Patti Smith wrote "This is a book for both the new and experienced reader. It has a strange casualness, as if it unfolded as Murakami wrote it; at times, it seems like a prequel to a whole other narrative ... A shedding of Murakami skin. It is not "Blonde on Blonde", it is "Blood on the Tracks".

In Time, Lev Grossman said that, similar to his opinions on Murakami's other works, "Murakami’s prose remains just as flat and Tsukuru’s affect remains just as empty."

In The Los Angeles Times, David L. Ulin said that "There is a rawness, a vulnerability, to these characters, a sense that the surface of the world is thin, and the border between inner and outer life, between existence as we know it and something far more elusive, is easily effaced."

In The Independent, Boyd Tonkin compared Murakami's writing to music, stating: "This author's signature tune, an almost child-like naivety harmonised with riddling sophistication, sounds throughout. Much-loved music can work that way as well. Like a jazz standard customised by a master improviser, or a Romantic piano piece that skips from nursery to cemetery, Murakami's prose seamlessly fuses folksiness and profundity."

Reviewing the novel for NPR, Meg Wolitzer wrote: "Colorless Tsukuru's mystery is solved before the end, but the mystery of the spell that the great Murakami casts over his readers, myself included, goes, as ever, unsolved. The novel feels like a riddle, a puzzle, or maybe, actually, more like a haiku: full of beauty, strangeness, and color, thousands of syllables long."

In the review of the novel for The Washington Post, Marie Arana called it "a deeply affecting novel, not only for the dark nooks and crannies it explores, but for the magic that seeps into its characters’ subconsciouses, for the lengths to which they will go to protect or damage one another, for the brilliant characterizations it delivers along the way ... Murakami can herd the troubles of a very large world and still mind a few precious details. He may be taking us deeper and deeper into a fractured modernity and its uneasy inhabitants, but he is ever alert to minds and hearts, to what it is, precisely, that they feel and see, and to humanity's abiding and indomitable spirit."

Other reviews were mixed. The Guardian concluded: "Although as adept as ever at setting up Kafkaesque ambiguity and atmosphere, he disappointingly chooses to leave most of the mysteries unresolved. Even so, it would be a great shame if, as with Updike, the words "Nobel prize" ultimately appear only in his fiction rather than his CV."

== Awards and honors ==
- 2014 Bad Sex in Fiction Award, shortlist
- 2014 New York Times Notable Book of the Year, one of 100
- 2015 Independent Foreign Fiction Prize, shortlist.

== Appearance in popular culture ==
In the first episode of season 2 of FX series The Bear, the character Richie has read the novel and describes its plot in his speech about searching for purpose.

== Editions ==
English first editions

Print:

- US hardcover (12 August 2014), 386 pages (of 400), Knopf, ISBN 978-0-385-35210-9
- UK hardcover (12 August 2014), 298 pages (of 304), Harvill Secker, ISBN 978-1-84655-833-7
- CA hardcover (12 August 2014), 386 pages (of 400), Bond Street, ISBN 978-0-385-68183-4
- Large-print paperback (12 August 2014), 464 pages (of 480), Random House Large Print, ISBN 978-0-8041-9453-2

Digital:

- US ebook (12 August 2014), 386 pages (of 400), Knopf, ISBN 978-0-385-35211-6
- UK ebook (12 August 2014), 298 pages (of 304), Vintage Digital, ISBN 978-1-4481-9095-9
- CA ebook (12 August 2014), 208 pages (of 210), Bond Street, ISBN 978-0-385-68184-1

Audio:

- Compact disc (12 August 2014), read by Bruce Locke, Random House Audio, ISBN 978-0-8041-6673-7
- Audio download (12 August 2014), read by Bruce Locke, Random House Audio, ISBN 978-0-8041-6674-4

All editions use US spelling. The UK edition also apply to Australia (12 August 2014), New Zealand (15 August 2014), India (27 August), and similar territories. The first-print editions contain a sheet of stickers (intended to customize the book jacket). The extra ISBN 978-1-84655-886-3 was a limited, 100-copy "signed edition" 240-page deluxe hardcover (shipped around 18 September 2014).

== See also ==
- Années de pèlerinage (Years of Pilgrimage), a suite of piano pieces by Franz Liszt. Among them, the piece "Première année: Suisse" (First year: Switzerland). Chapter 8, the piece "Le mal du pays" (Homesickness) appears to be an important motif.
- Morris Louis, whose painting Pillar of Fire is used for the Japanese cover.
