= Étienne Pivert de Senancour =

French writer and philosopher

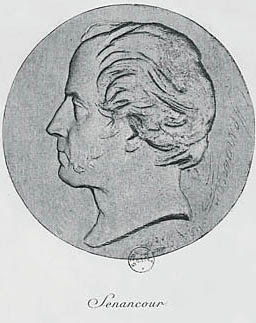

Étienne-Jean-Baptiste-Pierre-Ignace Pivert de Senancour (French pronunciation: [etjɛn pivɛʁ də sənɑ̃kuʁ]; 16 November 1770, in Paris – 10 January 1846, in Saint-Cloud) was a French essayist and philosopher, remembered primarily for his epistolary novel Obermann.

== Life ==
Much of Senancour's childhood was spent in a state of ill-health. He began his education with a curé in the vicinity of Ermenonville before being sent to the Collège de la Marche. His father, Claude-Laurent Pivert, a Contrôleur des Rentes and Conseil du Roi, wanted him to enter the seminary of Saint-Sulpice to become a priest. To avoid a profession for which he had no vocation, Senancour, with the help of his mother, fled to Switzerland in 1789. On 11 September 1790, he married Marie-Françoise Daguet with whom he had two children: a daughter Eulalie (1791) who would later follow in her father's footsteps and become a writer, and a son, Florian-Julien (1793), who went on to pursue a career in the military. The marriage was not a happy one; his wife refused to accompany him to the Alpine solitude he desired, and they settled in Fribourg.

His absence from France at the outbreak of the Revolution was interpreted as hostility to the new government, and his name was included in the list of émigrés. He visited France from time to time by stealth, but he only succeeded in saving the remnants of a considerable fortune. In 1799 he published in Paris his Rêveries sur la nature primitive de l'homme, a book containing impassioned descriptive passages which mark him out as a precursor of the romantic movement. His parents and his wife died before the close of the century, and Senancour was in Paris in 1801 when he began Obermann, which was finished in Switzerland two years later, and printed in 1804. This singular book, which has never lost its popularity with a limited class of readers, was followed in the next year by a treatise De l'amour, in which he attacked the accepted social conventions. During this period, he worked at the magazine Mercure de France where he made the acquaintance of Louis-Sébastien Mercier and Charles Nodier.

Senancour might have spent his life writing in complete obscurity were it not for a charge leveled against him by a public prosecutor for slandering religion in the second edition of his Résumé de l'histoire des traditions morales et religieuses (1827) wherein he described Jesus as a "youthful sage". He was initially found guilty and sentenced to nine months in prison and fined 300 francs, but the penalties were dropped on appeal. Attention to the case from the liberal press increased Senancour's standing, and many of his works were rediscovered and republished. The author revised and expanded Obermann for the 1833 edition.

Obermann, which is to a great extent inspired by Rousseau, was edited and praised successively by Sainte-Beuve and by George Sand, and had a considerable influence both in France and England. It is a series of letters supposed to be written by a solitary and melancholy person, whose headquarters are placed in a lonely valley of the Jura Mountains. The idiosyncrasy of the book in the large class of Wertherian-Byronic literature consists in the fact that the hero, instead of feeling the vanity of things, recognizes his own inability to be and do what he wishes. Danish literary critic Georg Brandes pointed out that while Chateaubriand's novella René was appreciated by some of the ruling spirits of the century, Obermann was understood only by highly gifted, sensitive temperaments, usually strangers to success.

Senancour was tinged to some extent with the older philosophe form of free-thinking, and had no sympathy with the Catholic reaction. Having no resources but his pen, Senancour was driven to hack-work during the period which elapsed between his return to France (1803) and his death at Saint-Cloud; but some of the charm of Obermann is to be found in the Libres Méditations d'un solitaire inconnu. Thiers and Villemain successively obtained for Senancour from Louis Philippe pensions which enabled him to pass his last days in comfort. Senancour also authored the comedic drama Valombré (1807), and late in life wrote a second novel in letters entitled Isabelle (1833). He composed his own epitaph, "Eternité, sois mon asile".

Senancour is immortalized for English readers in two poems by Matthew Arnold entitled Stanzas in Memory of the Author of Obermann and Obermann Once More.

Obermann has been translated into English three times: in its entirety by A. E. Waite (1903) and J. Anthony Barnes (1910), and in selections by Jessie Peabody Frothingham (1901).

== In music ==
Between 1848 and 1854, Franz Liszt composed Vallée d'Obermann, one of the pieces for piano of the suite Première année: Suisse, from the œuvre Années de pèlerinage, inspired by Senancour's most famous novel.

== Works ==
- (1792) Les Premiers Ages. Incertitudes humaines
- (1793) Sur les Générations actuelles, absurdités humaines
- (1795) Aldomen ou le bonheur dans l'obscurité
- (1799) Rêveries sur la nature primitive de l'homme
- (1804) Oberman (changed to Obermann in subsequent editions)
- (1806) De l'amour
- (1807) Valombré
- (1814) Lettre d'un habitant des Vosges sur MM. Buonaparte, de Chateaubriand, Grégoire, Barruel
- (1815) De Napoléon
- (1815) Quatorze juillet 1815
- (1816) Observations critiques sur l'ouvrage intitulé "Génie du christianisme", suivies de réflexions sur les écrits de Monsieur de Bonald
- (1819) Libres Méditations d'un solitaire inconnu
- (1824) Résumé de l'histoire de la Chine
- (1825) Résumé de l'histoire des traditions morales et religieuses
- (1833) Petit vocabulaire de simple vérité
- (1833) Isabelle
