= Virginie de Senancour =

Virginie Pivert de Senancour (Agathe-Eulalie-Ursule Pivert de) (1791–1876), the daughter of essayist Étienne Pivert de Senancour, was a French novelist and journalist. She served as her father's secretary and also wrote stories for children. Her work La Conquêtomanie is a satire against Napoleon. In Réplique à un mal avisé she responds to certain attacks levelled against her father by Eugène de Mirecourt. Nearly all the biographical information that exists about her father originates from her. One such biographical episode involves the novelist George Sand, who was influenced by Obermann. Eulalie writes that Sand, who tended to be tongue-tied with people she didn't know, sat facing the 63-year-old Senancour for 10 minutes without uttering a word before getting up and silently leaving the room.

== Works ==
- Les Héros comiques, nouvelles adressées aux dames (1820)
- Pauline de Sombreuse (1821)
- La Veuve, ou l'Épitaphe (1822)
- La Conquêtomanie, ou Aventures burlesques du grand Barnabé (1827)
- Réplique à un mal avisé (1858)
