= Itutu =

Word meaning "cool" from the Yoruba language

Itutu, a Yoruba word that is translatable as "cool", has been used by the Yoruba and more recently by Africanist art historians to describe the aesthetic that characterizes much Yoruba and some African-American art. An Itutu aesthetic includes the appearance of physical or sexual beauty whilst having a humble, calm, collected face that is found in much Yoruba sculpture. It has been suggested by Robert Farris Thompson of Yale University that Itutu is the origin of the American idea of the "cool". His 1973 article "An Aesthetic of the Cool" traces the idea of Itutu from the Yoruba to several other African civilizations and finally to the Americas, where the descendants of Africans perpetuated the importance of being "cool".

== See also ==
- Aṣẹ
- Sprezzatura
- Wu wei - a similar Chinese aesthetic
