= Paul Waley =

- Occupation: Scholar

Academic work
- Discipline: Human geography
- Sub-discipline: Japanology
- Institutions: University of Leeds

Paul Waley, a great-nephew of the scholar and translator Arthur Waley, is senior lecturer in human geography at the University of Leeds, and the author of books an articles on Tokyo and other topics in urban studies, Chinese urban geography, the history of Japan and related fields.

Waley started his career as a news reporter in Taiwan. In 1977 he moved to Japan, and became a reporter and columnist at The Japan Times. During this time in Japan he published his two books about Tokyo, a city for which his affection is very apparent. He later returned to the United Kingdom, completed his PhD and then assumed a position at the University of Leeds in 1992.

Subsequently, his research expanded from a focus on Japan to take into account the contemporary urban geography of China, Serbia, Indonesia, and West Yorkshire where he remained a resident.

Paul Waley retired from teaching in 2018 but retains emeritus status at the University of Leeds School of Geography.

== Selected bibliography ==
- Tokyo Now and Then: An Explorer's Guide. Weatherhill, 1984 ISBN 0-8348-0195-7
- Tokyo: City of Stories. Weatherhill, 1991 ISBN 0-8348-0227-9
- (co-edited with and Nicolas Fiévé), Japanese Capitals in Historical Perspective: Place, Power and Memory in Kyoto, Edo and Tokyo. Routledge Curzon, 2003 ISBN 0-7007-1409-X.
