= Lin Shaohua =

Chinese translator (born 1952)

- 林少华
- Born: 1952 (age 73–74); Jiutai, Jilin, China
- Education: Jilin University
- Occupations: Translator, author
- Writing career
- Language: Chinese, Japanese
- Period: 1989–present
- Genres: Prose, novel
- Notable work: Collection of novels by Haruki Murakami

Lin Shaohua (simplified Chinese: 林少华; traditional Chinese: 林少華; pinyin: Lín Shàohuá; born 1952) is a Chinese translator and author. He is a translator in China who translated the works of Haruki Murakami's into Chinese language.

== Biography ==
Lin was born in Jiutai, Jilin, with his ancestral home in Penglai, Shandong. After meddle school, he worked in the countryside as a farmer before the Cultural Revolution. He received his MA degree from Jilin University in 1982, majoring in Japanese language.

From 1982 to 1993, Lin taught Japanese language in Jinan University with his wife, and during 1993 to 1996, Lin taught in Nagasaki Prefectural University. In 1999, Lin was transferred from Xiamen to Qingdao where he was appointed as a professor.

== Works ==
=== Translations ===
- Hear the Wind Sing (且听风吟)
- Pinball, 1973 (一九七三年的弹子球)
- A Wild Sheep Chase (寻羊冒险记)
- Hard-Boiled Wonderland and the End of the World (世界尽头与冷酷仙境)
- Norwegian Wood (挪威的森林)
- Dance Dance Dance (舞舞舞)
- South of the Border, West of the Sun (国境以南，太阳以西)
- The Wind-Up Bird Chronicle (奇鸟行状录)
- Sputnik Sweetheart (斯普特尼克恋人)
- Kafka on the Shore (海边的卡夫卡)
- After Dark (天黑以后)
- A Slow Boat to China (去中国的小船)
- Firefly (萤)
- The Elephant Vanishes (象厂喜剧)
- The Silence (沉默)
- Kokoro (Natsume Sōseki) (心)
- Rashomon (Ryunosuke Akutagawa) 罗生门)
- The Temple of the Golden Pavilion (Yukio Mishima) (金阁寺)
- The Sound of Waves (Yukio Mishima) (潮骚)
- The Decay of the Angel (Yukio Mishima) (天人五衰)
- The Road of (Kaii Higashiyama) (唐招提寺之路)
- Socrates in Love (Kyoichi Katayama) (片山恭一·在世界中心呼唤爱)
- The Dancing Girl of Izu (Yasunari Kawabata) (伊豆的舞女)
- Snow Country (Yasunari Kawabata) (雪国)

=== Proses ===
- The Beauty of the Fallen Flowers (落花之美)
- Nostalgia and Conscience (乡愁与良知)
