= The Elephant Vanishes (short story) =

Haruki Murakami story published 1993

- Short story by Haruki Murakami
- Language: Japanese
- Genre: Fiction

Publication
- Publisher: Gary Fisketjon
- Publication date: 1993

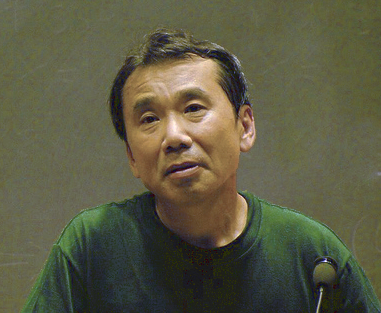
Haruki Murakami, author of "The Elephant Vanishes"

"The Elephant Vanishes" is the last short story in Haruki Murakami's collection of 17 short stories also titled The Elephant Vanishes. First written in 1980–1991, the story "The Elephant Vanishes" was published in a variety of Japanese magazines. Later on, the short story was a part of a collection of stories that was published in 1993 as an English compilation before its publication in 2005 as the Japanese book "Zō no shōmetsu".

Set in post-war Japan, the main protagonist, an unnamed narrator who sells household appliances, is deeply influenced by the seemingly impossible disappearance of the town elephant and the elephant's keeper. Murakami's use of magical realism, a writing technique that begins in a typical realistic setting and branches into unexplainable supernatural events, appears in this short story along with themes of identity, balance, and the changing scope of postindustrial society.

== Plot summary ==
The story begins with an unnamed narrator beginning his day reading the newspaper. Like clockwork, the narrator keeps to a tight morning routine which includes carefully looking through the newspaper. On that particular day, the big regional news specific to his suburban town was the disappearance of the local elephant and the elephant keeper.

The elephant, an old creature that the townspeople expect to die soon, was housed in the local zoo in the narrator's town until the zoo unexpectedly closed down. While all of the other animals were able to be resettle in other zoos across the country, no other zoo wanted to house an elephant so old and feeble. Thus, the land developer that controlled the zoo property and the town mayor made an agreement to continue to house the elephant in the inoperative zoo and the town would continue to take care of the elephant. While many townspeople worried about the cost of caring for the elephant, the mayor's justification was that the town would have control over the land and build high-rise condo buildings after the elephant died and that the animal was harmless and could even serve as a "town symbol."

Interestingly, there was nothing out of the ordinary that occurred the day before, according to numerous students that had visited the elephant around 5 PM before the local zoo exhibit closed. Even the newspaper reporters are unable to hide their bewilderment at the strange event. The narrator describes three major problems about this potential escape or disappearance, the first being that the elephant's steel shackle, usually chained to its right leg, was still intact. While it may have been possible for the keeper to unlock the shackle, free the elephant, and close it again, the keys for the shackle were locked in safes at the police and fire stations. Secondly, it was impossible to escape even after the keeper and elephant managed to be freed from the shackle because of the large fence surrounding the exhibit and single entrance to the zoo which was always locked. Lastly, there was no sign of elephant tracks that proved the elephant had used other escape methods. Thus, the narrator believes that there is only one possible conclusion: the elephant had not escaped, but had indeed vanished.

Because of the elephant's disappearance, the entire town is thrown into turmoil, with the mayor holding press conferences and pledging to find the culprit of this act. The police force is also actively investigating the situation attempting to alleviate the fears of the townspeople. Despite the police and the mayor encouraging citizens to reveal any information that would help with the search, the narrator decides to keep quiet because they "would not believe what [he] had to tell them." After several days go by, the narrator still remains silent, not divulging the information he appears to have, but instead creating a scrapbook with newspaper clippings related to the elephant's disappearance.

The unofficial "Part 2" of the story begins when the narrator recalls his relationship with a woman he met months after the event of the elephant's disappearance. While they initially were attendees at a party thrown by the narrator's company, they began to chat and connect as he oversaw the publicity of his company's kitchen equipment and she was an editor of a magazine interested in those products. The narrator quickly realizes that they have many things in common, which makes conversation easier.

The narrator then brings up the topic of the elephant, which he regrets but is unable to move away from because the woman is exceedingly interested. Immediately, the woman is aware that the narrator is withholding information and presses the narrator to explain why he believes the situation is so strange. The narrator mentions that he saw the elephant the day before the disappearance around 7 PM by looking down at the elephant house from a hill, a spot he frequently visited to observe the elephant. The narrator was fascinated at the close relationship seen between the elephant and its keeper, filled with a deep trust and "special warmth." The only thing that the narrator notices is strange is not in the actions of the elephant and its keeper but of their physical appearance. Instead of a large difference in size, the narrator had seen the elephant and keeper appear the same size, whether it be because the elephant had shrunk or the keeper had grown larger (or both).

The conversation between the narrator and woman quickly dwindles as the narrator is left to mull over the strange sight he saw the night before the disappearance. The narrator notes that that is the last time he ever saw the woman and that the townspeople also seem to forget about the elephant and the keeper.

== Main characters ==
In general, many of Murakami's earlier short stories have unnamed protagonists and characters. As he notes in an interview, much of his early work was written in the first person, Murakami bases the protagonist on a fictional interpretation of himself if the "situation and circumstances" were different. Because of the intimate and personal nature of his first person writing, Murakami felt "embarrassed" to name his characters. His later work, however, incorporates more third person writing where Murakami names his characters.

=== Narrator ===
Despite being the protagonist of the story, the narrator remains unnamed, although readers are given details about his identity. For instance, the narrator reveals that he is 31 and works at a company that produces electrical appliances as part of the PR team. The narrator continues to dwell on the elephant's disappearance and the strange sight that he saw even after those around him forget.

=== Elephant Keeper ===
The elephant keeper, later revealed to be 63 year old Noboru Watanabe, is responsible for taking care of the elephant and described to be an old man with a small and bony frame. While there was nothing particularly unique about his appearance, the keeper had "perfectly circular ears" that very clearly stuck out. Further, the keeper generally keeps to himself although not opposed to conversation. From the narrator's observations, the keeper and elephant have a particularly close bond of 10 years and have a unique way of communicating with each other.

=== Elephant ===
The elephant is described as an old creature that was taken care of by the narrator's small suburban town after the zoo unexpectedly shut down. The elephant is seen to have a close relationship with its keeper, Noboru Watanabe, who would take care of all of its needs.

=== Editor (love interest) ===
The narrator's unnamed love interest in the story is an editor for a women's home magazine. After conversing, the two characters "begi[n] to like each other" and find that they have much in common. She is openly curious about the narrator's connection to the elephant's disappearance and is the one who encourages the narrator to tell his account of what he saw the night before the disappearance. After this event, they fall out of touch and this is the last instance that the narrator sees her.

== Major themes ==
=== Finding identity ===
One of the main themes Murakami explores in many of his short stories is finding identity in a postwar Japan. As Strecher notes, the Zenkyoto movement popular among many young college students in Japan, sought to protest against ideas such as American imperialism. However, with the threats that many young individuals fought for being solved and Japan growing economically, there was an "identity crisis" where there wasn't an outlet for self-expression or cause to support.

Murakami, understanding this crisis among the younger generation, addresses this problem through his work. In The Elephant Vanishes, the narrator appears content living his life, having a stable job and a balanced routine that dictates his life. After a sudden "traumatic" awakening, the narrator is set on a journey to figure out this mystery of the disappearance of the elephant and its keeper that moves him away from the mundane life he was used to living. Welch makes it clear that the narrator's intense fixation on the disappearance, manifested in the way that he keeps a scrapbook of information related to the elephant, is less so about the actual event and more about the "intimate bond" that he sees between the elephant and keeper. He sees that he lacks this kind of intimate connection in his life and is thus able to contemplate what identity really is and understand that his life as a capitalist worker doesn't allow him to consider his identity and express himself as an individual.

Strecher provides another interpretation on the theme of finding identity by examining why Murakami inserts a "nameless" and "faceless" narrator. By not providing a name or unique characteristics to the narrator, Murakami raises the question of who the narrator is without the "excitement of the 1960s," a characteristic that defined much of the younger generation, and how the narrator can understand themselves without these defining features.

=== Efficiency and Modernity ===
Mori suggests that one of the key ideas that connects the two sections of the story together, the first section being the narrator's account of the disappearance event and the second section being the narrator's conversation with the editor, is the idea of economic efficiency. For instance, the narrator appears to value efficiency and usability when selling products for work. When conversing with the editor, he highlights the "functionality" of the kitchen products he sells and uses the English word "kitchen," perhaps alluding to American ideals of economic growth and productivity that also influenced Japan after the war.

While the narrator stresses this idea of economic efficiency outwardly, his unconscious desires to escape this way of thinking. This is seen in his actions of frequently visiting the elephant and being unable to forget the disappearance of the elephant and keeper, even when everyone else moves on. The image of the elephant counters the idea of economic efficiency and social productivity as the elephant's existence is unwanted. Even though the town adopts the creature, it is only because the townspeople expect to build advanced high-rise condos on the land after the elephant dies, an event anticipate to be soon. Because the elephant or the keeper's work isn't related to the economic productivity of the town or society at large, people are largely uninterested in the elephant and more interested in expanding their town.

However, the narrator retains a unique fascination with the elephant, even visiting the exhibit every week and finding hidden spots around town where he can observe the elephant and keeper after the zoo closes. Thus, when considering the narrator's actions, internally the narrator disagrees with the constant call for efficiency and social productivity that is encouraged in society. The narrator's interest and longing for a special and personal bond with others similar to the relationship seen between the elephant and its keeper also reveals that he is dissatisfied with his life that forces him to focus on his work and being productive and isolates him from interpersonal connection and building meaningful relationships.

=== Balance ===
Another theme Murakami explores in a number of his stories is the lack of balance or "equilibrium" in society. As the narrator notes, "[He] often get[s] the feeling that things around [him] have lost their proper balance... Some kind of balance inside [him] has broken down." Despite the narrator's ordered life before the disappearance of the elephant, after the event occurs, the narrator feels as if the world, or himself, is unbalanced. This is seen in the strange account of the elephant and the keeper being balanced in size and appearance. While the elephant and the keeper had some commonalities between their appearances, such as the keeper's ears, this ultimate balance of their size leads to an imbalance in the narrator's carefully curated lifestyle.

Lai points out the open-endedness of the effects this experience has for the narrator. One may argue that the "natural order" of things, or the balance in the narrator's life was destroyed, as the normal balance between the elephant, naturally larger than the keeper, and the keeper, expected to be smaller in size than the elephant, was dismantled. On the other hand, Lai notes that Murakami may have been referring to ideas of Shintoism, Japan's oldest religion, and how the strange "metamorphosis" was highlighting the intimate human-animal relationship founded on both the elephant and the keeper being "kami." As both animals and humans can become Shinto gods, or kami, the natural balance would be restored because this would be a natural phenomenon instead of a mystery. Further, this reveals how both the elephant and the keeper accepted a greater natural order that leads to additional aspects of balance and harmony.

== Critical reception ==
Despite the emphasis placed on The Elephant Vanishes with the editorial decision to not only name the English version after this story but also placing the narrative at the end of the collection, the reasoning being that the story had an intriguing title that would supposedly draw readers in, the story has not attracted as much attention compared to other popular short stories such as The Second Bakery Attack. Mori argues that one of the reasons why this story has not attracted such critical attention is because the story is considered "frivolous" and a story that is not only difficult to make sense of, but doesn't appear to have any significant themes or morals attached to the storyline.

However, there are also others that received the short story in a positive light. Murakami was already a well-known author in the US from his previous publications, such as A Wild Sheep Chase and Hard-Boiled Wonderland and the End of the World. Because of Murakami's immersion into American literature, drawing inspiration from writers such as Raymond Carver and Raymond Chandler, Murakami is able to create a broader application for his work that relates to American audiences. Further, Matsuoka notes that instead of separating the realms of "American" and "Japanese" literature, the similarities between the "lifestyle and literary interpretation" of both countries calls for Murakami's work to be included in contemporary modern literature.

Regarding The Elephant Vanishes, the story connects to broader audiences, even individuals who aren't familiar with Japanese society, because Murakami writes about common experiences of living in the 20th century, such as feelings of "dissociation" and isolation. Further, by writing stories set in more suburban areas of Japan, the author "minimaliz[es] the importance of place" so that readers can focus on the message and the story more than the setting of the story.

== Release ==
The short story was also published in The Oxford Book of Japanese Short Stories.
