= The Oxford Book of Japanese Short Stories =

The Oxford Book of Japanese Short Stories is a collection of short stories edited by Theodore W. Goossen and published by Oxford University Press in 1997.

David Mitchell, in The Independent, described it as "literary V&A covering Japan's modern era."

The collection has 35 stories. The work uses the Japanese naming order for Japanese names.

Haruki Murakami's story, "The Elephant Vanishes," was also published in the collection The Elephant Vanishes. Reviewer Roger Levesque describes it as "absurd". Levesque states that Taeko Kono's story, "Toddler Hunting," also published in Toddler Hunting and Other Stories, was "the most chilling" entry.

Jenny Tabakoff of the Sydney Morning Herald wrote that the volume is "excellent" and "highly readable".
