= Ted Goossen =

Canada-based academic

Theodore W. Goossen is a professor emeritus of contemporary Japanese literature at York University in Toronto, Canada. He is known for translating the works of a number of Japanese authors into English, most notably Haruki Murakami. Other authors he has translated include Shiga Naoya and Ibuse Masuji.

Goossen is also the co-editor of the translation journal Monkey Business International: New Writing from Japan.

== Early life and career ==
When he was nineteen, Goossen went to Japan for his third year of college, where he lived with homestay family and learned the Japanese language. There, he witnessed the 1968–1969 Japanese university protests.

Later, Goossen completed a PhD at the University of Toronto and a post-doctoral fellowship from the Canadian government. He encountered the works of Haruki Murakami during his doctoral studies after a friend introduced A Wild Sheep Chase to him. Goossen and Murakami then met in Toronto, after which Murakami contacted him to translate his short pieces. Goossen's first novel translations for Murakami were Hear the Wind Sing and Pinball, 1973.

In 1992, a year after Murakami's writing fellowship at Princeton University began, scholar Hosea Hirata organized a panel on Murakami's books at the annual Association of Asian Studies conference which, according to organizers, was "packed." Goossen, as well as frequent Murakami translator Jay Rubin, was in attendance. According to translator David Karashima, Goossen claimed that the panel was a "turning point in terms of Murakami's position within Japanese literary studies in the U.S."

While working at the University of Tokyo, Goossen met Motoyuki Shibata, a frequent collaborator of Murakami's. Together, they co-edit Monkey Business International: New Writing from Japan, a journal of Japanese literature translated into English, with several pieces taken from the original Monkey Business, Shibata's Japanese-language quarterly. The international edition has featured several pieces by Haruki Murakami, as well as the first excerpts of Hiromi Kawakami's People From My Neighborhood.

== Awards ==
In 2018, Goossen was awarded the Order of the Rising Sun, Gold Rays with Rosette, in honour of his work in developing Japanese studies and promoting the understanding of Japanese culture in Canada.

== Bibliography ==
=== Books ===
- The Oxford Book of Japanese Short Stories

=== Translations ===
- Dragon Palace, Hiromi Kawakami
- Hear the Wind Sing, Haruki Murakami
- Killing Commendatore, Haruki Murakami
- Men Without Women, Haruki Murakami, co-translated with Philip Gabriel
- People From My Neighborhood, Hiromi Kawakami
- Pinball, 1973, Haruki Murakami
- Reconciliation, Shiga Naoya
- Strange Weather in Tokyo, Hiromi Kawakami
- The Strange Library, Haruki Murakami
- The Third Love, Hiromi Kawakami
- "The Kitchen God" and its accompanying interview "Hiromi Kawakami on Communalism in Japan" for The New Yorker, Hiromi Kawakami
