= Yu Shi (writer) =

Chinese Writer and literary translator

- 于是
- Born: Yu Ying (于滢); October 14, 1976 (age 50)
- Occupations: Writer, literary translator, Podcast host
- Writing career
- Pen name: Yu Shi
- Genres: Novel, Essays

Yu Shi (Chinese: 于是; born 14 October 1976), birth name: Yu Ying (于滢), is a Chinese writer, literary translator, and podcast host based in Shanghai. She is a member of the Shanghai Writers Association and the Shanghai Translators Association.

== Early life and education ==
Yu Shi graduated from East China Normal University in 1998.

Since the 1990s, she has published essays and fiction in Chinese literary publications including Xinmin Evening News, Mengya, and Shanghai Literature.

She has also contributed articles and interviews to magazines including ELLE, Rayli, 25Ans, Harper’s Bazaar and LOHAS.

== Career ==
=== Writing ===
Yu Shi began publishing novels and essays in the 1990s.

In 2002, she published the novels Cohabitation Notes (later revised and republished as Afterwards and Seraph, as well as the essay collection Nights Out of the Window.

In 2018, she published A Historical Story Of Daddy Boy (Original title: 查无此人), a novel about a father and daughter who both affected by Alzheimer’s disease, exploring the loss of personal and collective memory across three generations, from the pre-Liberation period onward. It was later published in Taiwan in Traditional Chinese by Linking Publishing in 2020.

In 2022, Yu Shi co-authored the novel One and Only (Chinese: 《有且仅有》) with Lin Xiaohua. The novel focuses on the experiences of a family affected by autism spectrum disorder. It portrays a mother who supports her son and husband in coping with autism spectrum conditions and gradually integrating into society.

=== Translation ===
Since 2005, Yu Shi has worked as a literary translator, translating English-language literature into Chinese.

==== Selected translations ====
Yu Shi has translated works by a number of contemporary English-language authors, including:

- The Testaments by Margaret Atwood
- Flights by Olga Tokarczuk
- Oranges Are Not the Only Fruit by Jeanette Winterson
- The Gap of Time by Jeanette Winterson
- Gut Symmetries by Jeanette Winterson
- Hand to Mouth by Paul Auster
- The Story of Lucy Gault by William Trevor
- The Life and Death of Yukio Mishima by Henry Scott Stokes
- Duma Key by Stephen King
- Doctor Sleep by Stephen King
- The Dark Tower VII: The Dark Tower by Stephen King

=== Journalism and podcasting ===
Yu Shi has written book reviews and conducted literary interviews for Chinese cultural publications, including Modern Weekly and Fiction World. She has interviewed writers and cultural figures including Kai Bird, Junot Díaz, Jesse Eisenberg, Fiona Kidman, and Daniela Dröscher.

Since 2020, she has co-hosted the literary podcasts TiaoDao FM and Ping-Pong FM.
