= Toddler Hunting and Other Stories =

2024 book

- Author: Taeko Kono
- Language: English
- Genre: Short story collection
- Published: 1996
- Publisher: Little, Brown and Company
- Publication place: United States

Toddler Hunting and Other Stories is a collection of short stories by Taeko Kono. In the English version, Lucy North was the primary translator while Lucy Lower had contributed other translation work. The English translation was first published in 1996 by New Directions Publishing. The first story in the collection was written in 1961, and the last one was written in 1971. The English translation of the collection was republished in 2018.

Kirkus Reviews stated that most of the short stories have a similar structure. John Self, in The Guardian, describes the works as "unignorably strange" and characterized by "sexual violence and masochism". Writer Gelareh Asayesh, in the Tampa Bay Times, wrote that the writing style in the collection is "unadorned". Maryse Meijer of Publishers Weekly stated that Kono does not intend to "shock" nor use "sensationalism or surprise" but instead to show how desire has a freeing feeling as well as the negative effects of having feelings of shame. Gabe Habash, in The Paris Review, stated that a lack of closure is an element in these stories.

== Contents ==
The collection gets its title from one story, "Toddler Hunting" (幼児狩り Yōji-gari), in which the female protagonist has, in Self's words, an "unhealthy interest". This story was also published in The Oxford Book of Japanese Short Stories.

One story, "Final Moments," is about a woman who realizes that her death will occur tomorrow, and describes her subsequent actions. Hiromi Kawakami, writing in The New York Times, stated that, as translated by Allison Markin Powell, the work is "surprisingly tranquil and matter of fact."

== Reception ==
Kirkus Reviews gave a starred review, arguing that the volume "should be an electrifying discovery" for people interested in short stories available in English.

Publishers Weekly gave a starred review, arguing that the volume is "strikingly original and surprising".
