= Alfred Birnbaum =

American translator

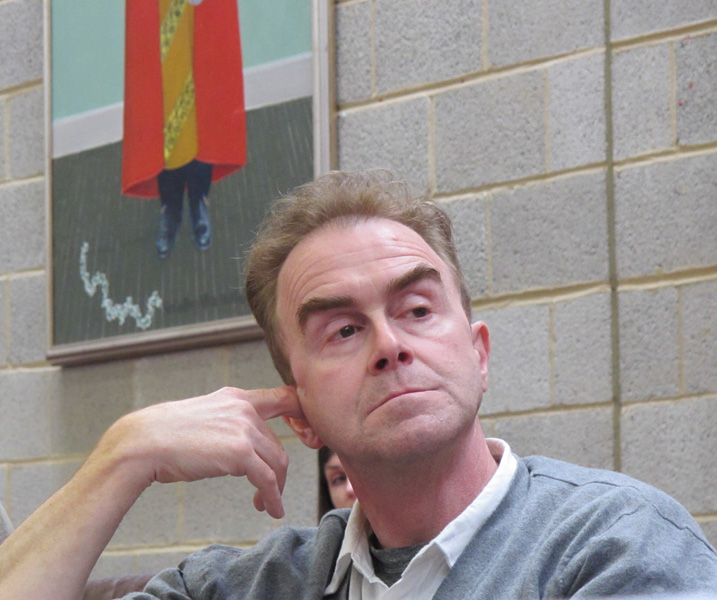
Alfred Birnbaum (2011)

Alfred Birnbaum (born 1955) is an American translator.

Alfred Birnbaum was born in the United States and raised in Japan from age five. He studied at Waseda University, Tokyo, under a Japanese Ministry of Education scholarship, and has been a freelance literary and cultural translator since 1980.

From March 1977 to June 1979 Birnbaum, William Shurtleff, and Akiko Aoyagi did extensive field research and translation in Japan on natto, hamanatto and Daitokuji natto. This material was later published (in various formats) by Soyinfo Center, a research and publishing company in Lafayette, California. In the 1990s, while studying in Yangon, he helped document architecture that was being replaced or destroyed.

Birnbaum's translations include Haruki Murakami's Hear the Wind Sing, Pinball, 1973, Norwegian Wood, A Wild Sheep Chase, Dance Dance Dance, Hard-Boiled Wonderland and the End of the World, Underground, and other works; Miyabe Miyuki's All She Was Worth; and Natsuki Ikezawa's A Burden of Flowers. He also compiled the short story anthology Monkey Brain Sushi: New Tastes in Japanese Fiction. With his wife Thi Thi Aye he translated Smile as they Bow by Nu Nu Yi from Burmese into English.

== See also ==
- Philip Gabriel
- Jay Rubin
