= People From My Neighborhood =

2016 short story collection by Hiromi Kawakami

- Author: Hiromi Kawakami
- Original title: People Around Here (このあたりの人たち, Kono Atari no Hito-tachi)
- Translator: Ted Goossen
- Language: Japanese
- Genre: Short story collection
- Publisher: Switch Publishing
- Publication date: June 29, 2016
- Publication place: Japan
- English publication date: August 6, 2020 (Granta); November 30, 2021 (Soft Skull)
- ISBN: 978-1-84627-698-9
- Preceded by: Under the Eye of the Big Bird (大きな鳥にさらわれないよう, Ōkina Tori ni Sarawarenai yō)
- Followed by: The Third Love (三度目の恋, San-dome no Koi)

People From My Neighborhood (Japanese: このあたりの人たち, Hepburn: Kono Atari no Hito-tachi; lit. 'People Around Here') is a 2016 short story collection by Hiromi Kawakami published by Switch Publishing. In thirty-six interlinked stories, the book explores the lives of people in a neighborhood outside of Tokyo. An English translation by Ted Goossen was published by Granta Books in 2020 and Soft Skull in 2021. The book was a nominee for a 2021 Shirley Jackson Award for a single-author collection.

== Content ==
The book follows the lives of several characters in a neighborhood through thirty-six stories, specifically focusing on the mundane, quotidian details about their experiences. The book is intended to consist of palm of the hand stories similar to the book and tradition by Yasunari Kawabata.

== Critical reception ==
In a starred review, Kirkus Reviews called the book "engaging and winsome", likening it works by Italo Calvino and Lyudmila Petrushevskaya albeit with a Japanese sensibility. Publishers Weekly called it a "magical and engaging collection".The New York Times appreciated how "Kawakami's style traffics in brevity, giving us images distilled to their core, sentences that go directly to the heart" while also commending the book for its "brightness, a kind of love and familiarity."

Some critics were mixed on the book's structure. The Asian Review of Books found that "the relationships between characters are remarkably strong" with particular emphasis on the relationship between the narrator and Kanae. Waxwing Literary Journal argued that "the communal nature of the narration" helped bind the collection together. Similarly, The Brooklyn Rail wrote that "It's this idea of community that is at the heart of this series of stories: over years and through events both strange and mundane, the narrator shows us the essential interconnectedness of life in her neighborhood and all those who live there." The New Yorker found that the short stories exemplified the genre established by Kawabata's palm of the hand stories. Meanwhile, the Chicago Review of Books lamented that "the collection lacks cohesion despite featuring recurring characters".
