= Hear the Wind Sing =

1979 novel by Haruki Murakami

- First book edition
- Author: Haruki Murakami
- Original title: Kaze no uta o kike 風の歌を聴け
- Translator: Alfred Birnbaum
- Language: Japanese
- Genre: Realist novel, Slice of life
- Publisher: Kodansha
- Publication date: July 1979
- Publication place: Japan
- English publication date: February 1987
- Media type: Print (Paperback)
- Pages: 165 (US); 201 (JP)
- ISBN: 4-06-186026-7
- OCLC: 21379479
- Followed by: Pinball, 1973

Hear the Wind Sing (風の歌を聴け, Kaze no uta o kike) is the first novel by Japanese writer Haruki Murakami. It first appeared in the June 1979 issue of Gunzo, and in book form the next month. The novel was adapted by Japanese director Kazuki Ōmori in a 1981 film distributed by Art Theatre Guild. An English translation by Alfred Birnbaum appeared in 1987.

It is the first book in the so-called "Trilogy of the Rat" series of independent novels, followed by Pinball, 1973 (1980) and A Wild Sheep Chase (1982), before the later epilogue Dance Dance Dance (1988). All four books in the series have been translated into English, but Hear the Wind Sing and Pinball, 1973 (which are realist novels slightly differing from the author's later style) were never widely distributed in the English-speaking world, having only been published in Japan by Kodansha under their Kodansha English Library branding (for English Foreign Language learners), and both only as A6-sized pocketbooks. This was due to Murakami viewing the two novels as "works from his immature period". An omnibus English edition of Murakami's first two novels (Hear the Wind Sing and Pinball, 1973), under the title Wind/Pinball, with translations by Prof. Ted Goossen of York University, was released in the United States in August, 2015.

== Title ==
The title "Hear the Wind Sing" came from the last sentence of Truman Capote's short story "Shut a Final Door" - "Think of nothing things, think of wind." However, the title of the novel submitted to the Gunzo Literature Prize committee was "Happy Birthday and White Christmas". The old title appears at the top of the cover page of the published book in small fonts.

== Background ==
The inspiration to write a novel struck Murakami suddenly while watching the opening day match of the NPB's 29th season on April 1st, 1978, with the Yakult Swallows at Meiji Jingu Stadium, at the moment Dave Hilton hit a double in the 1st inning. Murakami was running a Jazz cafe at the time. He wrote at night, completing it after ten months.

== Themes ==
The story covers the craft of writing, the Japanese student movement, and, like later Murakami novels, relationships and loss. Also like later novels, listening to western music, cooking, eating, and drinking are regularly described. The narrator's close friend, "the Rat", around whom the trilogy of the Rat evolves, is a student and bar patron who expresses a general alienation towards society. The narrator describes the (fictional) American writer Derek Hartfield as a primary influence, citing his pulp science fiction works, and quoting him at several points.

== Plot summary ==
Feeling writing as a terribly painful task, the narrator retells the story of his 1970 summer. He was a student at a university in Tokyo then, and returned to his seaside hometown in Kobe for summer vacation. That spring, a girl he dated at the university died by suicide. During the summer vacation, he frequented J's bar with his friend "the Rat" and spent much time drinking beer obsessively. One day, he came across a girl lying on the floor in the washroom of the bar and carried her home. The girl had no left little finger. Later, he ran into the girl by chance in the record store where she worked. After that, she started calling him and they hung out a few times. Meanwhile, Rat was clearly troubled about some woman but he did not disclose the details. One day, the girl without a little finger met the narrator at a restaurant near the harbor. They took a walk in the dusk along the warehouse street. She told him, "When I sit there alone, I can hear a lot of people coming to talk to me..." That night, at her apartment, she revealed she just had an abortion. When he came back in the winter, the girl had left the record store and her apartment. The narrator is married now and living in Tokyo. Rat is still writing novels and sends his manuscripts to the narrator every Christmas.

== Characters ==
I
The narrator of the story, born on Dec 24, 1948. (Murakami was born on Jan 12, 1949). "I" was a university student studying biology who returned to his hometown for summer vacation.

The Rat
Born in September, he and "I" became friends in "I"'s freshman year and they hung out a lot. He lived in a 3-story house with a greenhouse on the rooftop.

J
Bartender of J's Bar, a Chinese man. "I" once commented that J's Japanese is better than his own. He has never been to China before.

The girl without a little finger
Born on January 10, she lost her left little finger at the age of 8. She had a twin sister and worked in a record shop. Development of her relationships with main hero is the main romantic subplot of the story.

"I"'s high school classmate girl
She lent "I" a California Girls record in high school, and in the summer of 1970 made a request of the same song on radio for me. She dropped out of university due to illness in March 1970.

The sick girl
A 17 year old girl who contracted a disease which affected her spinal nerves and had been bedridden for 3 years. She is also most likely the sister of a girl that gave "I" "California Girls" in school.

Three uncles
"I"'s first uncle gave him a book written by Derek Hartfield. He died three years later of intestine cancer. His second uncle stepped on a landmine laid by himself in Shanghai 2 days after the end of World War II. His third uncle was a traveling magician touring the hot springs around Japan.

Three girls I slept with
The first girl was a classmate and girlfriend in high school; she and the protagonist broke up a few months after graduation. The second was a 16-year-old hippie girl "I" met in the Shinjuku subway station; she stayed in his apartment for one week and left. The third was a girl "I" met in the university library who was studying French. In the spring of the next year, she was found to have hung herself in a forest.
The third girl is also the one next book partially focuses on and develops the role of on "I" identity growth.

DJ of NEB radio station
Host of "Pop Telephone Request" - a 2-hour radio program starting at 7pm every Saturday. He motivates main hero to search for a girl who gave him musical record when he was in school.

Derek Hartfield
A writer who wrote a lot of pulp fictions about aliens and monsters. "I" learnt a lot about writing from him. At the time this novel was published, many channels for information like internet were non-existent. Hence many readers assumed Derek Hartfield was a real life author, so much so that many librarians were puzzled in receiving requests of books written by Derek Hartfield.

== Awards ==
- The 22nd Gunzo Prize for New Writers (April 1979)
- The 81st Akutagawa Prize (July 1979) - nominated
- The 1st Noma Literary Newcomer's Prize (Dec 1979) - nominated

== Cultural references ==
Music

- Rainy Night in Georgia
- Who'll Stop the Rain
- California Girls
- Piano Concerto No. 3 (Beethoven)
- Nashville Skyline
- Return to Sender
- Everyday People
- Woodstock (song)
- Spirit in the Sky
- Hey There Lonely Girl
- Good Luck Charm

Others

- Fiat 600
- Saber
- Richard Burton
- Sentimental Education
- Gimlet
- Roger Vadim
- Jules Michelet
- Triumph TR3
- Convoy
- Mother Joan of the Angels
- Malleus Maleficarum

== English Language Editions ==
- Murakami, Haruki (1987). Hear the Wind Sing. Translated by Alfred Birnbaum. ISBN 4-06-186026-7.
- Murakami, Haruki (4 August 2015). Wind/Pinball: Two Novels. Translated by Ted Goossen. ISBN 978-0-385-35212-3.
