= Waseda International House of Literature =

Library and museum in Shinjuku, Tokyo

Coordinates: 35.70986565882317°N 139.71992741839705°E

- 早稲田大学国際文学館
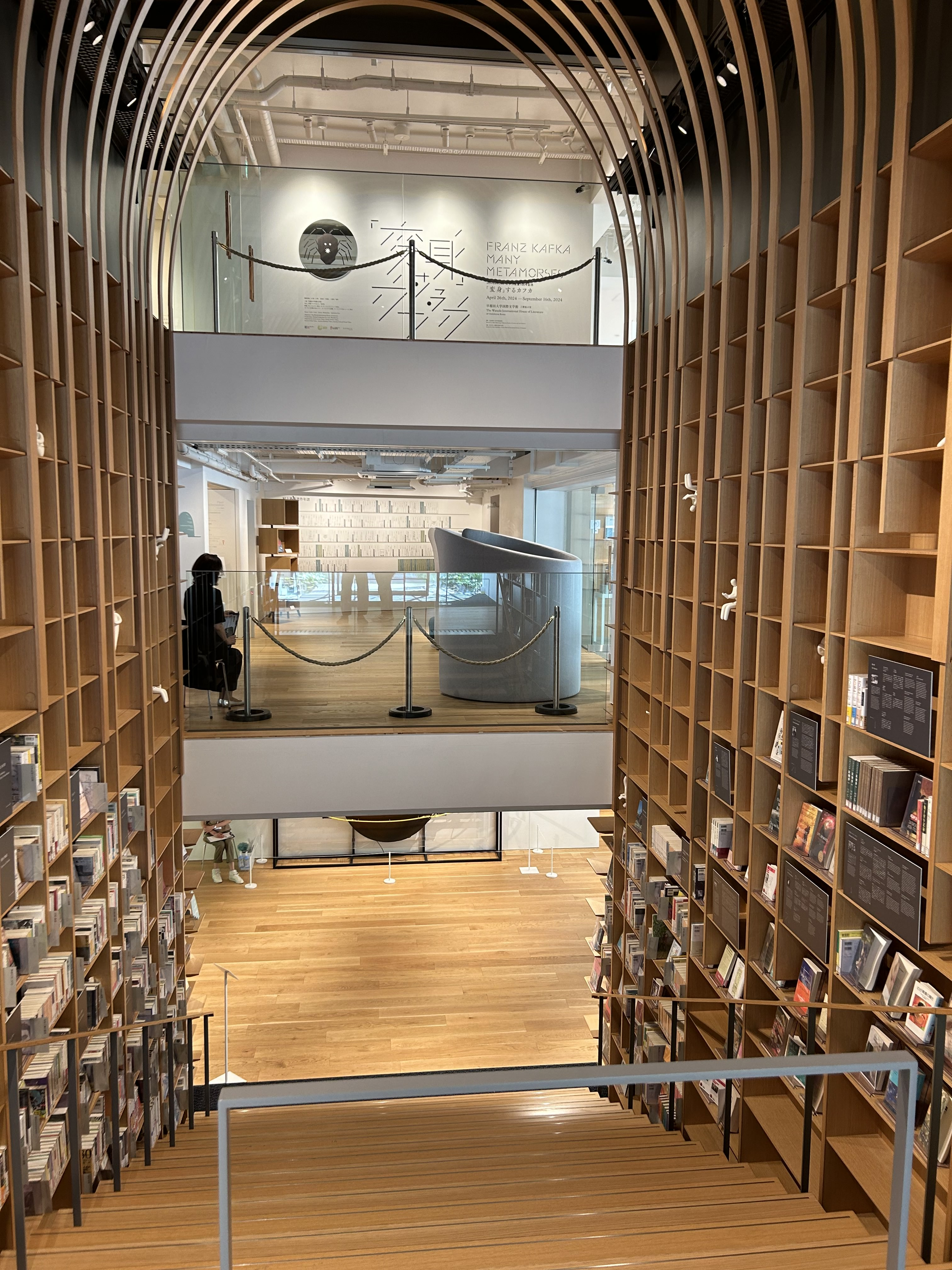
- Stairway, archway of the library (2024)
- Alternative names: Haruki Murakami Library

General information
- Location: 1-6-1 Nishiwaseda, Shinjuku 169-0051 Tokyo Prefecture

The Waseda International House of Literature, also known as the Haruki Murakami Library, is an academic building, library, and museum exhibition space at Waseda University in Shinjuku designed by Japanese architect Kengo Kuma.

== Background ==
As a young adult, Murakami attended Waseda University starting in 1968 and graduated with a degree in drama. Decades later, Murakami decided to donate thousands of books, vinyls, and archival materials to the university for archival purposes. As a "rebuilding, remodeling, and renovation of the old Building 4" on Waseda University's campus, the building's envisioning and subsequent construction took three years, starting in 2018. In addition to Murakami's support, the project received assistance from Tadashi Yanai, the chief executive officer of Fast Retailing. Murakami himself wanted to make a venue that was dynamic and alive, as opposed to a static place that people only wanted to visit once. In designing the building, Kuma "envisioned a lively place where anyone, including Murakami himself, could come to discuss the novelist's works and the future of literature over coffee, instead of a formal space for studying and whispering in hushed tones."

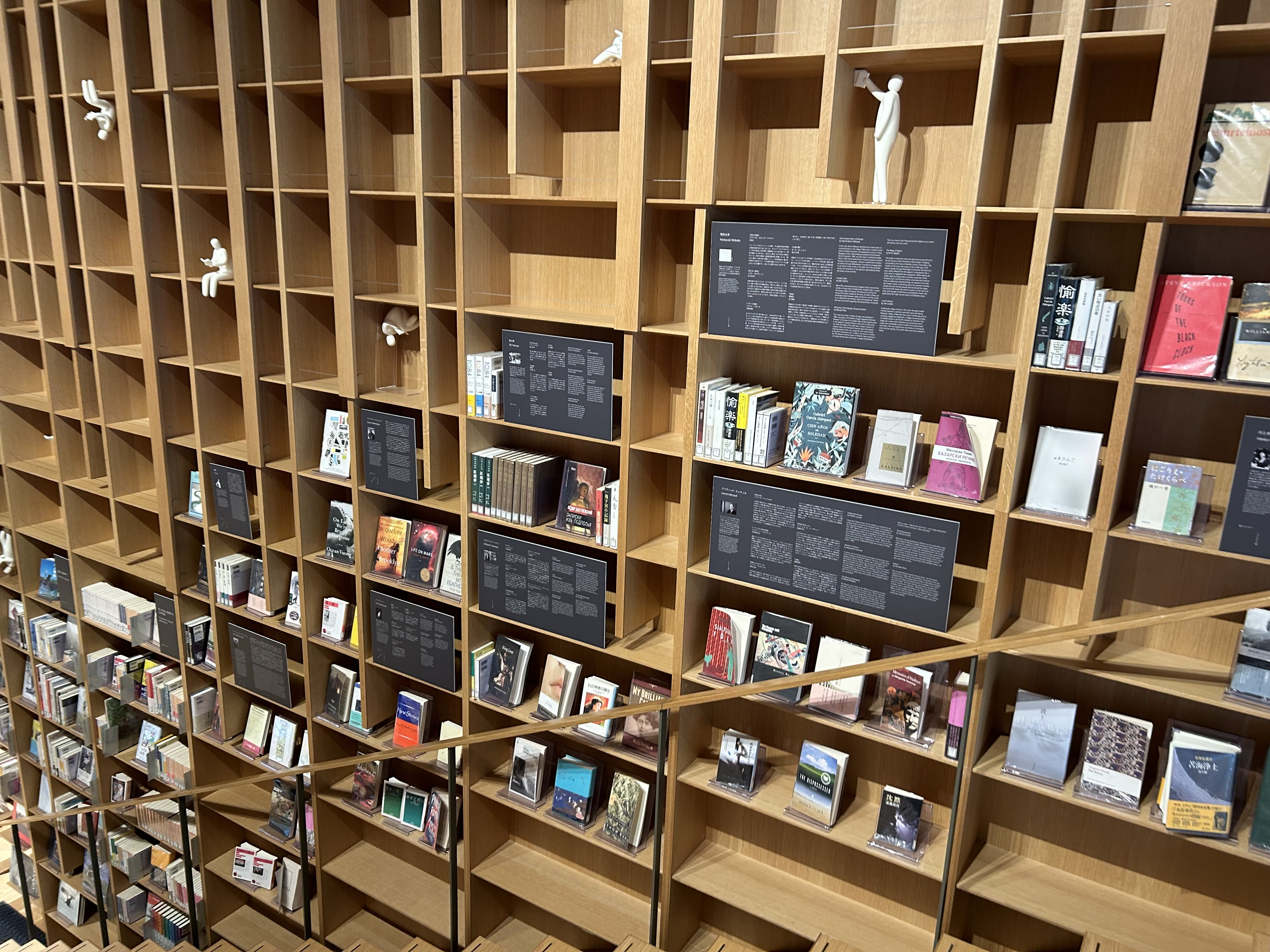
Books and inscriptions along the main stairway

The building debuted for public entry on October 1, 2021. Hirokazu Toeda, a professor of modern Japanese literature at Waseda University, serves as the building's director. Professor Robert Campbell also helped with the building's establishment from the very start and has since served as its advisor.

== Features ==
=== Library ===
The library portion of the building hosts over 3,000 of Murakami's novels in various editions and translated in over 50 languages. It also shelves books "organized by their relationship to Murakami's novels."

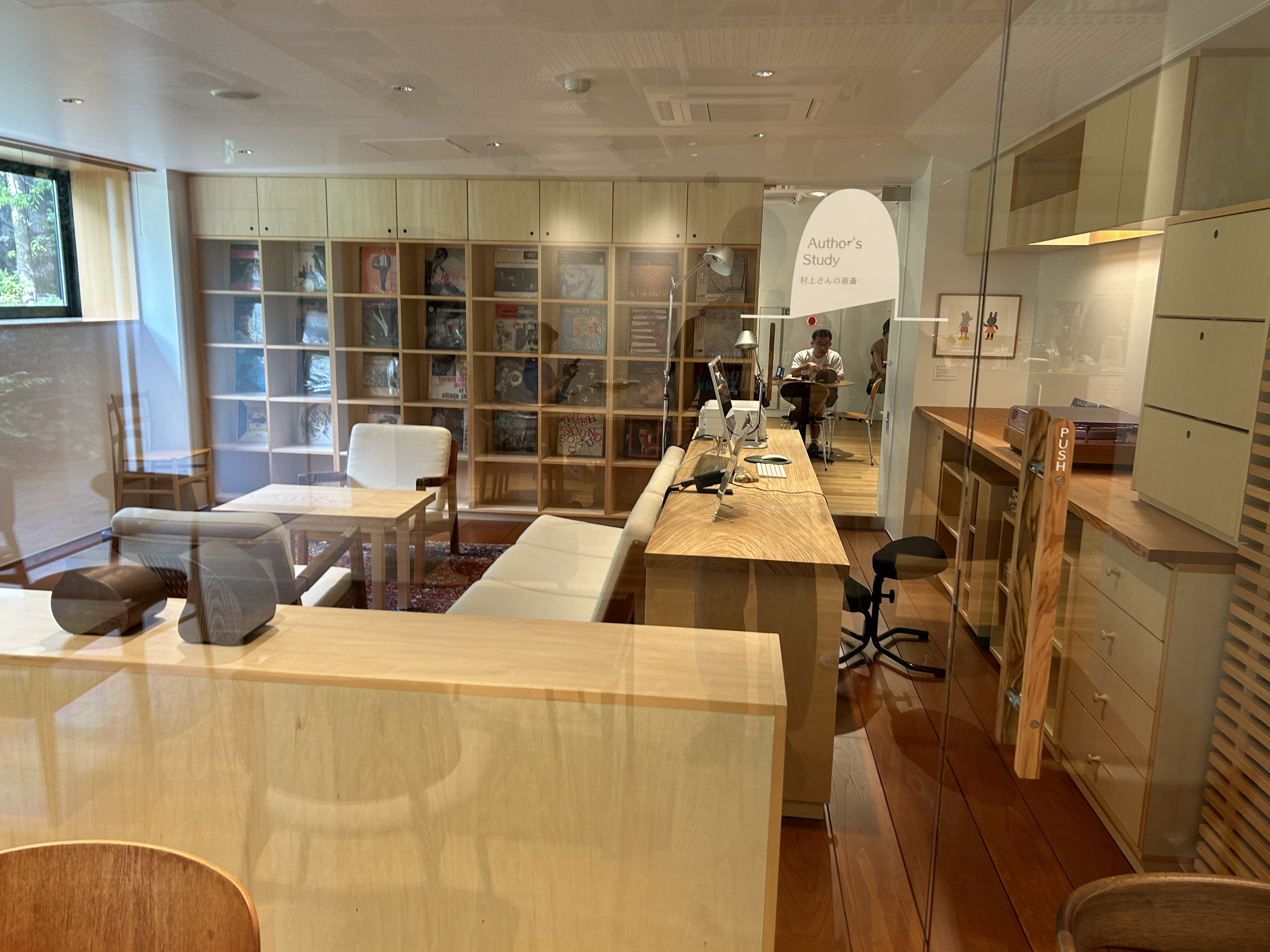
A replica of Murakami's study

=== Café ===
On the first floor of the building, the Orange Cat café provides a food and beverage menu inspired by Murakami's works. It also hosts a piano previously used in Murakami's jazz bar, Peter Cat, which he ran prior to his novelist career, as well as a replica installation of Murakami's study room replete with countless records. The café additionally sells merchandise.

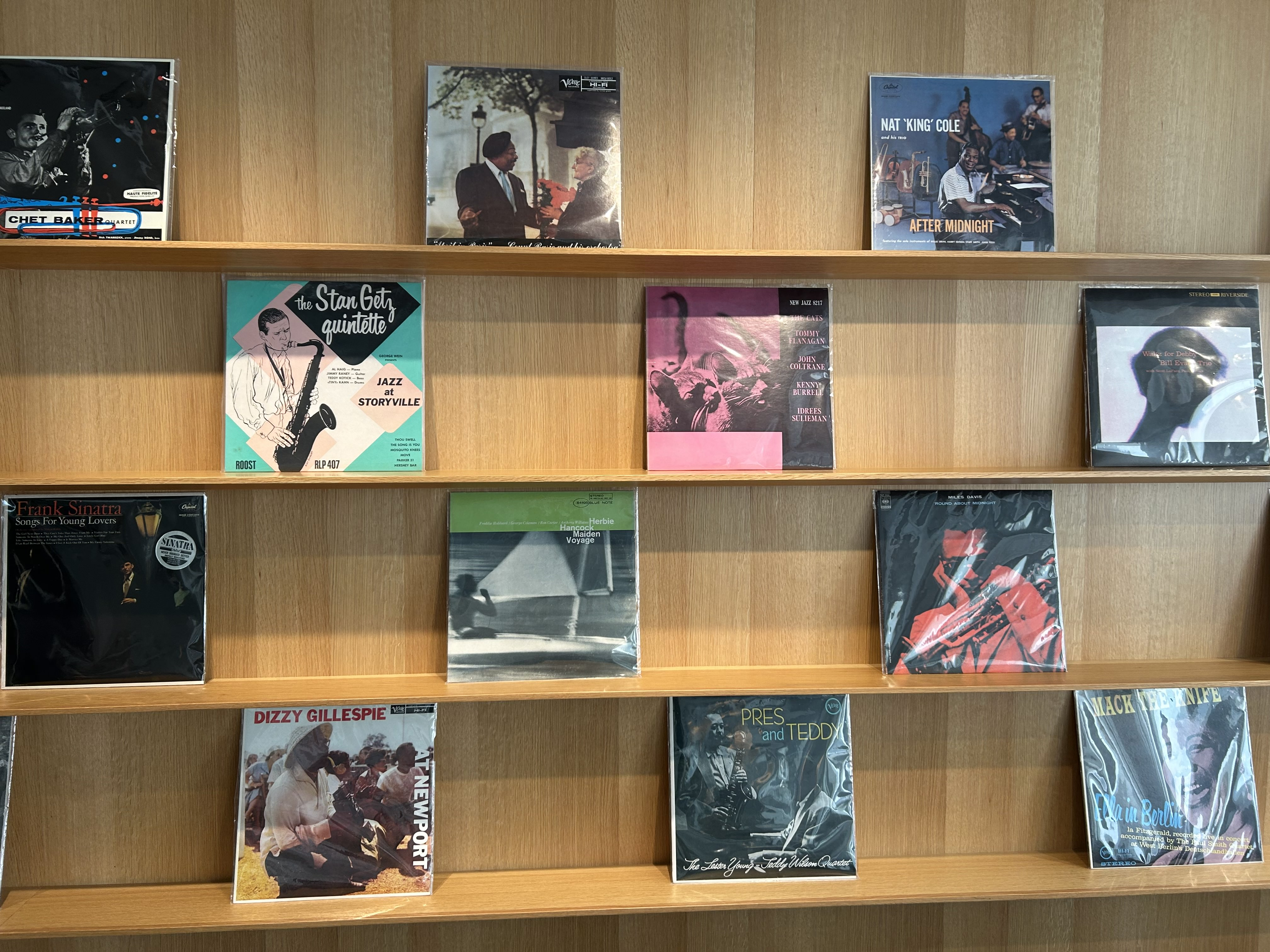
The listening room

=== Listening room ===
On the second floor, the building possesses a public listening room with an audio system where visitors can play records.

=== Events ===
The building has hosted several literary and music events since its opening in 2021, including readings by Japanese authors such as Keiichiro Hirano, Yoko Tawada, and Yōko Ogawa. On July 3, 2024, the building served as the venue for Waseda University's six annual Campus Piano event. In March of 2024, Murakami performed a public reading of his story, "Kaho", published in The New Yorker, to an audience of over a thousand attendees in order to fundraise for the library—Japanese author Mieko Kawakami was also a present reader.

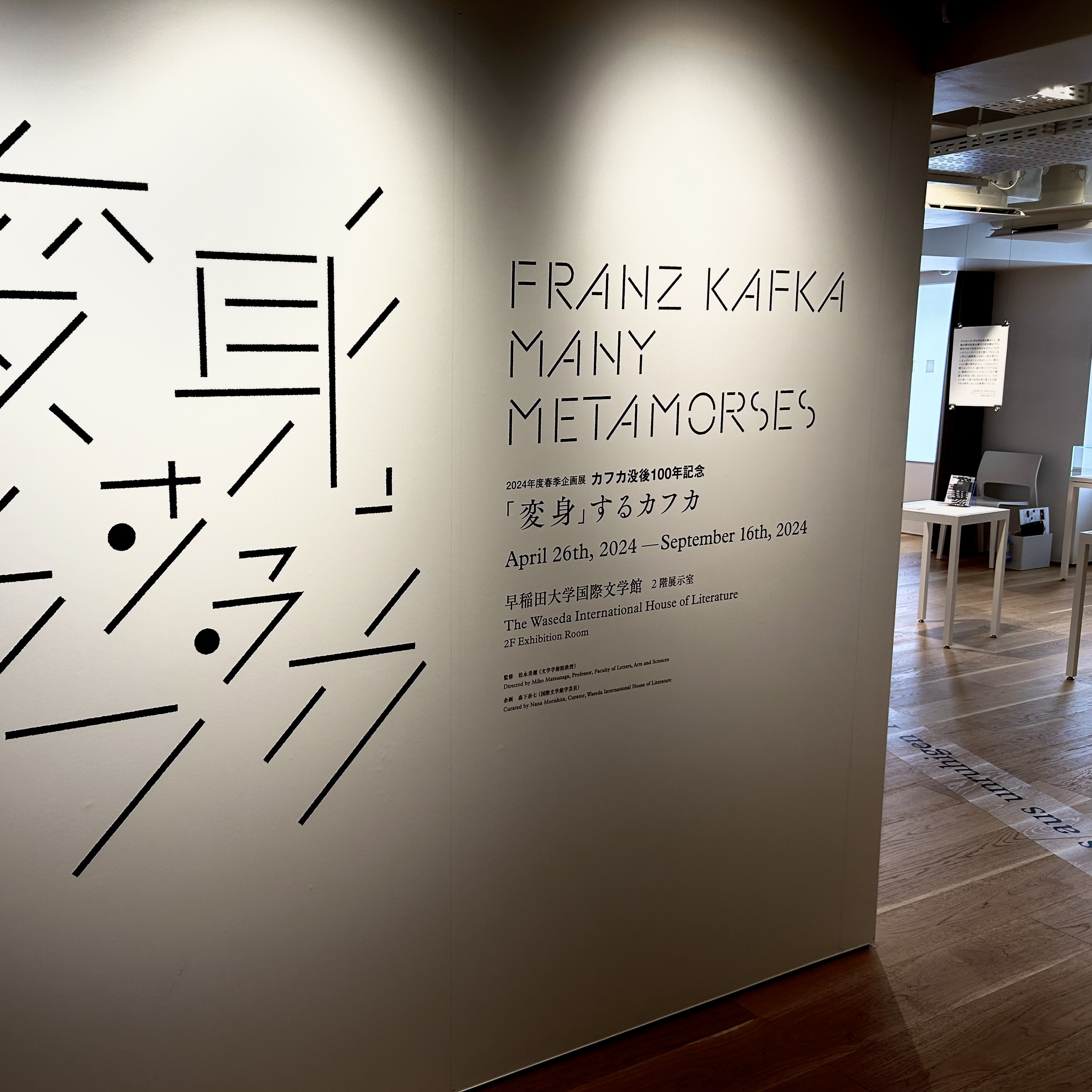
The "Franz Kafka's Many Metamorphoses" exhibit which

== Exhibitions ==
The building has hosted several limited-time exhibitions.

- Yoko Yamamoto Print Exhibition–Encountering World Literature From Capote to Murakami
  - October 1, 2024–May 27, 2025
- 100th Memorial Exhibition: Kafka Metamorphosis
  - "Metamorphosis stories have been around since Greek mythology, including works like Ovid's Metamorphoses, Garnett's Lady into Fox, and The Moon Over the Mountain and Other Stories by Atsushi Nakajima. Notably, Franz Kafka's The Metamorphosis is highlighted for its compelling depiction of transformation. The exhibition delves into various translations and illustrations of Kafka's character Ungeziefer, examining its visual interpretations. It also explores how modern writers like Haruki Murakami and manga artists have been influenced by Kafka's work, shedding light on Kafka's reception in Japan."
  - April 26, 2024–September 16, 2024
- Mizumaru Anzai Exhibition: Works with Haruki Murakami
  - "Illustrator Mizumaru Anzai (1942–2014), known for his 30-year collaboration with Haruki Murakami on works like 'The End of the Elephant Factory,' 'Asahi-do by Murakami,' and 'Fuwafuwa,' is celebrated for his humorous and heartwarming illustrations characterized by simple lines and colors. His hand-drawn illustrations and casually written text create rich imagery in essays and other works. Anzai's work continues to be beloved by many people."
  - November 17, 2023–April 9, 2024
- Contemporary Japanese Literature Repackaged for the Anglosphere and Beyond
  - "This exhibition focuses on translations of Japanese literature published mainly in English-speaking countries since 1985, including Haruki Murakami. It introduces the background and development of contemporary Japanese literature being read around the world."
  - October 1, 2022–March 26, 2023
- Jazz and Literature: Scoring Sound / Cutting Language
  - "Focusing on jazz, this exhibition explores the Japanese jazz culture of the 1960s and 1970s and introduces novels by Haruki Murakami, Hiroyuki Itsuki, Yasutaka Tsutsui, Kenzaburo Oe, and others."
  - May 20, 2022–August 28, 2022
