= Taeko Kono =

Japanese writer (1926-2015)

- 河野多惠子
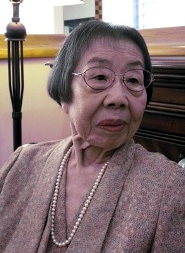
- Born: February 24, 1926 (15th year of Taisho); Osaka, Japan
- Died: January 29, 2015 (aged 88)
- Occupation: Author
- Writing career
- Genre: Fiction

Taeko Kono (河野多惠子, Kōno Taeko; February 24, 1926 – January 29, 2015) was a Japanese writer who was active during the latter half of the 20th century. Kōno belonged to a generation of female Japanese writers who became more well-known in the 1960s and 70s. She established a reputation for herself as an acerbic essayist, a playwright, and a literary critic.

By the end of her life, she played a role in Japan's literary establishment and one of the first female writers to serve on the Akutagawa Literary Prize committee. Kenzaburō Ōe, Japan's Nobel Laureate, described her as one of the most lucidly intelligent female writers in Japan, and the US critic and academic Masao Miyoshi identified her as among the most "critically alert and historically intelligent". US critic and academic Davinder Bhowmik described her as one of the truly original voices of the twentieth century, beyond questions of gender or nationality. A writer who deals with dark themes, Kōno is known to many English speaking readers because of her collection of short stories Toddler-Hunting and Other Stories (New Directions, 1996).

== Biography ==
Taeko Kono was born in Osaka, Japan to Kōno Tameji and Yone; her father Tameji operated a business specializing in mountain produce. As a child, she suffered from poor health. When she was 15, the Pacific War broke out and her teenage years were dominated by service as a student worker sewing military uniforms and working in a munitions factory.

After the war, she finished her economics degree at Women's University (currently Osaka Prefecture University), graduating in 1947. Kōno has written about the new sense of freedom and the high hopes she had after the war. Determined to make a career for herself as a writer, she moved to Tokyo, a city full of literary activities and literary personae, joined a literary group led by Fumio Niwa, and threw herself into writing while working full-time.

After nearly a decade of trying to get published, during which she suffered several setbacks in her health including two bouts of tuberculosis, the literary magazine Shinchōsha began publishing her stories in 1961. In 1962, she was awarded Shinchōsha's "Dōjin zasshi" ("Coterie Magazine") award for her story "Yōji-gari" ("Toddler Hunting" [幼児狩り]). In 1963 her short story "Kani" (Crabs) (蟹) won the prestigious Akutagawa Prize (her story "Yuki" [Snow] had been nominated in 1962). After this, Kōno began to produce a stream of remarkable short fiction. In 1965 she married the painter Yasushi Ichikawa. In 1967 she was awarded the Women's Literary Prize for Saigo no toki (Final Moments), in 1968 the Yomiuri Prize for A Sudden Voice (不意の声), and in 1980 she won the Tanizaki Prize for "A Year-long Pastoral" (一年の牧歌). She received a prize from the Japanese Art Academy in 1984 and the Noma Literary Prize in 1991 for her novel Miira-tori ryōkitan (Mummy-Hunting for the Bizarre, 1990). Kōno's short story "Hone no niku" (Bone Meat) was published in the 1977 anthology Contemporary Japanese Literature (ed. Howard Hibbett), which stimulated interest in her writing among readers in English. A trickle of translations into English followed in a variety of anthologies of Japanese women's writing in translation, culminating in the publication of Toddler-Hunting and Other Stories in 1996. Kōno continued to write all her life, and was still writing when she died in hospital in January 2015. In 2014 she was awarded a Bunka Kunshō, or Order of Culture, which is presented by the Emperor to distinguished artists, scholars, or citizens who make remarkable contributions to Japanese culture, arts and science.

== Literary analysis ==
Kōno's writing explores how "underneath the seemingly normal routines of daily life, one may find hidden propensities for abnormal or pathological behavior," demonstrating that often "reality and fantasy are not so clearly distinguishable from each other." Alternative sexual practices is a theme that permeates Kōno's writing. Sadomasochism, for example, figures in "Toddler-Hunting," "Ants Swarm" (1964), and her novel Miira-tori ryōkitan. Kaiten tobira (Revolving Door, 1970) features spouse-swapping. Kōno uses these themes to explore sexuality itself and the expression of identity. She combines these elements with illness, childlessness, and the absence of a husband to delve even more deeply into these topics.

More specifically, her writings explore "the struggles of Japanese women to come to terms with their identity in a traditional patriarchal society." Most of her female characters "reject traditional notions" of femininity and gender roles, their frustration "leads them to violent, often antisocial or sadomasochistic ways of dealing with the world." For example, in "Yōjigari," or "Toddler Hunting," one of her most famous stories, she investigates one woman's dislike of children. The protagonist, Akiko Hayashi, is repulsed by little girls but obsessed by little boys: she even imagines a little boy being beaten by his father to the extent that his innards spill out. She also takes pleasure in the sadomasochistic sex she has with her adult partner. One critic has written that the story "turn[s] the myth of motherhood on its head" while another argued that Hayashi was a representation of demonic women who threatened patriarchy itself. In Fui no koe (1968), which one critic has called a "modern woman's Hamlet," Kōno presents the story of Ukiko, whose dead father haunts her. His ghost instructs her to murder the people who are controlling her life. At the end of the story, it is revealed that all of these incidents are only taking place within her mind and she is "trying in her twisted way to bring meaning to her everyday relationships."

== Selected list of works ==
Year	Japanese Title	English Title	Prizes
	骨の肉	"Flesh of the Bones"	
	血と貝殻	"Blood and Shell"	
	不意の声	"A Sudden Voice"	
	みいら採り猟奇譚	"Cruel tale of a hunter become prey"	
1960	「女形遣い」	"Uses of a Female Impersonator"	
1961	Yōjigari (Japanese: 幼児狩り, Yōjigari)	"Toddler-Hunting"	
1963	Kani (Japanese: 蟹, Kani)	"Crabs"	Akutagawa Prize
1967	Saigo no toki	"The Final Hours"	
1969	Fui no Koe (Japanese: 不意の声, Fui no Koe)	"A Sudden Voice"	Yomiuri Prize
1970	Tetsu no Sakana (Japanese: 鉄の魚, Tetsu no Sakana)	"Iron Fish"	
1971	Hone no niku	"Bone Meat"	
1980	Ichinen no bokka (Japanese: 一年の牧歌, Ichinen no bokka)	"A Year-long Pastoral"	Tanizaki Prize

== English translations ==
- Kōno, Taeko. Toddler-hunting & Other Stories. Trans. Lucy North. New York: New Directions, 1996. ISBN 0-8112-1391-9.
