= Dance Dance Dance (novel) =

1988 novel by Haruki Murakami

- First edition (Japanese)
- Author: Haruki Murakami
- Original title: ダンス・ダンス・ダンス; Dansu Dansu Dansu
- Translator: Alfred Birnbaum
- Language: Japanese
- Published: January 1994 (Kodansha International) (JPN)
- Publication place: Japan
- Media type: Print (Hardback & Paperback)
- Pages: 393 pp
- ISBN: 978-0099448761
- OCLC: 24
- Dewey Decimal: 895.6/35 20
- LC Class: PL856613 1994
- Preceded by: A Wild Sheep Chase

Dance Dance Dance (ダンス・ダンス・ダンス, Dansu Dansu Dansu) is the sixth novel by Japanese writer Haruki Murakami. First published in 1988, it was translated into English by Alfred Birnbaum in 1994. The book is a sequel to Murakami's novel A Wild Sheep Chase. In 2001, Murakami said that writing Dance Dance Dance had been a healing act after his unexpected fame following the publication of Norwegian Wood and that, because of this, he had enjoyed writing Dance more than any other book.

== Plot summary ==
Dance Dance Dance begins four and a half years after the events depicted in A Wild Sheep Chase. The narrator briefly reminds the reader of that story, which saw his girlfriend disappear after they had stayed at a run-down hotel in Hokkaido called the Dolphin. He then explains that he has become a successful writer, but that he is deeply unsatisfied by the work. His life has also been filled with various personal problems, from divorce to the death of his cat.

In March 1983, the unnamed narrator travels back to Hokkaido in search of closure over the events of his past, from which he still suffers some trauma. After doing a simple assignment, he checks into the newly refurbished Dolphin Hotel. It has changed from a run-down establishment to an extremely high-end one, and now goes by the name l’Hôtel Dauphin.

A receptionist approaches him after he inquires about the previous incarnation of the Dolphin, telling him that she has had a supernatural experience and is curious about what the hotel used to be like. In great detail, she tells him that she got in the staff elevator but that it stopped at a non-existent floor, where she was temporarily trapped in a cold, dark, damp-smelling hallway. Something that “wasn’t human” moved towards her but she managed to escape.

When he tries to reach the mysterious hidden floor, the narrator fails, but later, when he is not paying attention, the elevator dumps him there. In the darkness, he runs into the Sheep Man, a tiny, wool-clad supernatural being from A Wild Sheep Chase. He claims to have been waiting here for the narrator but won’t say why. He says that his job is to connect things and tells the narrator “Yougottadance.” (In the English translation, the Sheep Man’s words run together without spacing and only minimal punctuation.) The two converse but the Sheep Man’s answers are extremely cryptic and the narrator learns little except that this other world is not the land of the dead.

By chance, the narrator goes to a cinema to use the restroom, then watches a movie starring his high-school classmate, Ryoichi Gotanda. In one scene, the narrator’s ex-girlfriend, Kiki, appears. He watches the movie several more times, pondering the coincidence and how it relates to the Sheep Man’s claim of connecting things.

The narrator decides suddenly to return to Tokyo and is asked to chaperone a thirteen-year-old girl called Yuki, whose mother has forgotten her. There is a blizzard and their flight is delayed. The unlikely pair bond, despite their age difference and the girl’s grumpy disposition. She confesses that she too has seen the Sheep Man.

The narrator is able to get in touch with Gotanda and the two have dinner. Gotanda tells him that Kiki suddenly disappeared not long ago. Back at Gotanda’s, they order prostitutes on Gotanda’s company expense account. The narrator asks one of the women about Kiki, who confirms that she simply disappeared.

A few days later, the narrator is arrested in connection with the murder of the prostitute he slept with at Gotanda’s house. He is rigorously interrogated by police officers that he calls Fisherman and Bookish due to their appearances. The officers know he did not kill her but keep playing mind games with him for three days, certain that he is hiding something.

When he is released with the help of Yuki, who has called her father for legal assistance, the narrator goes to meet the girl and she tells him that she has psychic powers, which is how she knew of the Sheep Man. Her father offers him a job looking after Yuki, but he refuses, saying that he doesn’t want money and will only see the girl when he chooses.

The narrator agrees to escort Yuki to Hawaii to visit her mother. They stay for two weeks and at the end the narrator thinks he sees Kiki. He stops their rental car, gets out, and chases her. She leads him to the eighth floor of a building and disappears. In the room are six skeletons.

Back in Tokyo, the narrator continues his relationship with Gotanda and tries to reconnect with Yumiyoshi by phone. He borrows Gotanda’s Maserati and takes Yuki for a ride, but she starts to feel sick and blames the car. Later, she and the narrator go to see the movie starring Gotanda that includes the scene with Kiki. Again, Yuki starts to feel sick and after the movie she says that she 'saw' that Gotanda is the one who killed Kiki.

When the narrator confronts Gotanda, the actor says it is probably true that he killed Kiki but he cannot remember. He says that all his life he has been compelled to do terrible things like hurting people and killing animals. He doesn’t know if he killed Kiki, but suggests he probably did. The narrator seems less convinced, but when he goes to get them both a beer, Gotanda drives off and kills himself by crashing the car into Tokyo Bay.

The narrator goes back to Sapporo and checks into the Dolphin. Yumiyoshi visits him at three in the morning and they have sex. The narrator says he will move to Sapporo to allow them to pursue their relationship together. Later, he is woken in the night by Yumiyoshi, who has discovered their whole room is now in the other realm. They search for the Sheep Man but cannot find him. Yumiyoshi passes through a wall and the narrator follows her, panicked that he will lose her. He then wakes in his hotel room to find Yumiyoshi fully dressed, siting on the couch, saying she had been watching him dreaming. She comes back to bed with the narrator.

== Major themes ==
Several of the novel's characters are hallmarks of Murakami's writing. Dance Dance Dance deals with themes of gender, sexuality, loss and abandonment, as do many of Murakami's other novels. Often, the male protagonist in a Murakami novel will lose a mother, spouse, or girlfriend. Other common Murakami themes this novel includes are technology, alienation, absurdity, and the ultimate discovery of a human connection.

In Murakami’s first four books, no characters had been given names, except for comical or ironic ones. This changed with Norwegian Wood and then Dance Dance Dance, his sixth book, saw him adding some names. He even retroactively names one character from A Wild Sheep Chase – a woman called Kiki. Even with real names, however, Murakami is playful. Kiki has beautiful ears and her name means “hearing.” There is a mother called Rain and her daughter is Snow. The father is called Hiraku Makimura, an anagram of Haruki Murakami. Most people are playfully nameless and some are given nicknames for their appearance, such as Bookish and Fisherman. When someone asks the narrator his name, he replies, “Winnie the Pooh.”

== Differences in English translation ==
The supernatural character known as the Sheep Man speaks differently between the two versions. The character speaks normal Japanese in the original work, but in the English translations, his speech is written without any spaces between words. Written Japanese does not typically demarcate words with spaces.

== Critical reception ==
Kirkus Reviews said that "Despite intentions and effects that are sometimes too strained", the novel was "a sobering descent into a contemporary hell—with a guide who's made it brilliantly his own dark literary domain." Comparing Murakami to Yukio Mishima, Publishers Weekly said that "In this impressive sequel to A Wild Sheep Chase, Murakami displays his talent to brilliant effect" and "All the hallmarks of Murakami's greatness are here: restless and sensitive characters, disturbing shifts into altered reality, silky smooth turns of phrase and a narrative with all the momentum of a roller coaster."

Helen Birch, in The Independent lauded the book for its "Surprising, fresh images" and "an entertaining adventure that takes us to the frozen north of Japan, to Hawaii and to the dark, damp corners of the imagination" with "a downbeat commentary on consumerism and the Japanese work ethic, and to a smattering of pretty good jokes."

Herbert Mitgang, in The New York Times, appreciated Alfred Birnbaum's "hopping" translation which "valiantly interprets the author's numerous references to American music, books and movies." He further noted the clash between east and west in Murakami's work, stating that "His rapid-fire style and American tastes seem deliberately designed to break any possible connection to traditional novelists from his own country like Kōbō Abe, Yukio Mishima or Yasunari Kawabata, Japan's only Nobel laureate in literature. True, in his fiction there are echoes of Raymond Chandler, John Irving and Raymond Carver, but Mr. Murakami's mysterious plots and original characters are very much his own creation."

In the Los Angeles Times, Michael Harris said that the novel demonstrated "Murakami’s colloquial, wisecracking style, ably translated by Alfred Birnbaum" and "successfully mixes genres—the philosophical quest, the topical satire, the whodunit" while the characters "are vividly drawn, no matter how unlikely the situations they encounter." Although he found that "The narrative voice ... pulls like a diesel", he also noted that "Loose ends dangle from the novel" and questions are left unanswered.

== Book information ==
Dance Dance Dance (English edition) by Haruki Murakami; translated by Alfred Birnbaum.

- Hardcover ISBN 4-7700-1683-2, published in January 1994 by Kodansha International
- Paperback ISBN 0-6797-5379-6, published on January 31, 1995 by Vintage Press
