= Pinball, 1973 =

1980 novel by Haruki Murakami

- cover of English-language edition
- Author: Haruki Murakami
- Original title: Pinball,1973 (1973年のピンボール, Sen-Kyūhyaku-Nanajū-San-Nen no Pinbōru)
- Translator: Alfred Birnbaum (1980), Ted Goossen (2015)
- Language: Japanese
- Genre: Surreal, realist novel
- Publisher: Kodansha International
- Publication date: June 1980
- Publication place: Japan
- English publication date: September 1985
- Media type: Print (Paperback)
- Pages: 215 pp (US); 207 pp (JP)
- ISBN: 4-06-186012-7 (US 1st edition); ISBN 4-06-116862-2 (JP 1st edition)
- OCLC: 417360370
- Preceded by: Hear the Wind Sing
- Followed by: A Wild Sheep Chase

Pinball, 1973 (1973年のピンボール, Sen-Kyūhyaku-Nanajū-San-Nen no Pinbōru) is a novel published in 1980 by Japanese author Haruki Murakami. The second book in the "Trilogy of the Rat" series, it is preceded by Hear the Wind Sing (1979) and followed by A Wild Sheep Chase (1982), and is the second novel written by Murakami.

All three books in the Trilogy of the Rat have been translated into English, but Pinball, 1973, and Hear The Wind Sing, the first two books in the trilogy, were only printed as English translations in Japan by Kodansha under their Kodansha English Library branding, and both only as A6-sized pocket editions. Before being reprinted in 2009, these novels were difficult to locate and quite expensive, especially outside Japan. Murakami is alleged to have said that he did not intend these novels to be published outside Japan. Whether or not this is true, both novels are much shorter than those that follow and make up the bulk of his work, and are less evolved stylistically. The title reflects that of the well-known Oe Kenzaburo novel, The Silent Cry, which in the original Japanese is titled Football, First Year of the Man'en Era [1860] (万延元年のフットボール, Man'en Gannen no Futtobōru).

An omnibus English edition of Murakami's first two novels (Hear the Wind Sing and Pinball, 1973), under the title Wind/Pinball, with translations by Prof. Ted Goossen of York University, was released in the United States in August, 2015.

== Plot introduction ==
Despite being an early work, Pinball shares many elements with Murakami's later novels. It describes itself in the text as "a novel about pinball," but also explores themes of loneliness and companionship, purposelessness, and destiny. As with the other books in the "Trilogy of the Rat" series, three of the characters include the protagonist, a nameless first-person narrator, his friend The Rat, and J, the owner of the bar where they often spend time.

== Plot summary ==
The plot centers on the narrator's brief but intense obsession with pinball, his life as a freelance translator, and his later efforts to reunite with the old pinball machine that he used to play. He describes living with a pair of identical unnamed female twins, who mysteriously appear in his apartment one morning, and disappear at the end of the book. Interspersed with the narrative are his memories of the Japanese student movement, and of his old girlfriend Naoko, who hanged herself. The plot alternates between describing the life of the narrator and that of his friend, Rat. Many familiar elements from Murakami's later novels are present. Wells, which are mentioned often in Murakami's novels and play a prominent role in The Wind-Up Bird Chronicle, occur several times in Pinball. There is also a brief discussion of the abuse of a cat, a plot element which recurs elsewhere in Murakami's fiction, especially in Kafka on the Shore and The Wind-Up Bird Chronicle (in which the search for a missing cat is an important plotline). Rain and the sea are also prominent motifs.

== Characters ==
In order of appearance in the story.

I / Protagonist - The narrator of the story, 24 years old. He is the co-founder of a translating company and he takes care of the twins. He is looking for a pinball machine named the three-flipper Spaceship.

Naoko - She is the deceased college girlfriend of the protagonist.

The twins - Completely identical, the protagonist awakens to both of them in his bed one morning. They do not reveal their names and live with the protagonist. It is mentioned multiple times that they make good coffee.

The Rat - The protagonist's friend from university, 25 years old. Rich university dropout, he seems to be stuck in time since the spring he quit school. He goes to J's bar daily.

The friend - The friend is the co-founder of the translating company. He translates from French. He also has a sick wife and a 3 year old son.

The girl - She is a young woman out of business school and an employee of the translating company. Described as having long legs and a sharp mind, she likes humming the song "Penny Lane".

J the bartender - J is a 45 year old Chinese man and he owns a bar where the protagonist and the Rat used to go frequently during their university days. The Rat still goes daily.

The repairman - The repairman is from a phone company and he shows up at the protagonist's apartment to replace his switch panel.

The girl with long hair - She lived above the protagonist in university, until she dropped out of school. The protagonist would often answer phone calls that were intended for her.

The woman - The woman and the Rat are in a casual relationship and see each other once a week. She is a 27 year old architect.

The Spanish instructor - He is a university Spanish instructor and a pinball machines junkie. He helps the protagonist on his quest to find the three-flipper Spaceship.

The doctor - She is a woman in her fifties. She helps the protagonist regain hearing.

== Major themes ==
Pinball 1973, as well as the Rat Trilogy in general, introduces themes known today as classic Murakami tropes such as the appearance of the uncanny into the mundane. The narrative, detached from the tangible world and highly introspective, sets a surreal tone for the novel, in which the narrator seems to find little unusual about such things as living with twins whom he cannot distinguish and whose names he does not know, or performing a funeral for a telephone circuit box. The novel also hints vaguely at supernatural occurrences (which often appear in Murakami's fiction), for instance with the anthropomorphic presence of the three-flipper Spaceship pinball machine.

Similar to many of Murakami's other novels, the protagonist is a detached, apathetic character whose deadpan demeanor stands either in union or, more often, starkly in contrast with the attitudes of other characters. He confesses in the novel that he is at a stage in life where he copes with a meaningless routine by "wanting nothing more". However, the protagonist's calmness appears to be a protection against the loss he went through in the first novel of the trilogy, which explains his attitude of detachment.

Furthermore, there is an overall sense of melancholia that follows the protagonist in Pinball 1973. This emotional state is established early on as he explains that there is sometimes a strange feeling that comes over him, a feeling as if he is splitting into pieces. Shadows of his past keep following him as he is trying to move on. He expresses himself often on Naoko and her family, and travels to a train station she had described to him in an attempt to mourn. There is also in a sense the loss of the Rat, who is still alive and present in the story, but not in contact with the protagonist anymore. The pinball machine is a direct reference to both Naoko and the Rat, and therefore to a life he will never find back.

== Critical reception ==
=== English translation for Wind/Pinball together ===
Kirkus Reviews stated that the novellas were "Not as well-developed as the later books, and mostly for completists. Still, it’s interesting to see hints of the masterly novels to come in these slender, pessimistic tales." Likewise, Karl Williams in The Michigan Daily said that "One can see the scaffold upon which Murakami would build his illustrious career. Most of the pleasure from reading his early novels stems from witnessing a deft writer learn his craft." Publishers Weekly stated that they were "two excellent, though fragile, works in their own right."

Steve Erickson, for The New York Times, wrote that the Pinball half of the two was stronger: "With its more assured voice, its greater mastery of tone and the confidence of a sharper and more mature whimsy, 'Pinball, 1973' demonstrates the extent to which the author was already progressing in leaps." For Chicago Tribune, Nick Romeo said: "Both books are powerful, unsettling, mature novels, replete with many of the same distinctive traits that characterize his later fiction: jazz, beer, a gentle surrealism, a tendency to treat the strange and the mysterious as mundane facts of life and characters haunted by an ineffable, pervasive melancholy, a kind of metaphysical perplexity that arises from the basic nature of being human."

In The Guardian, Ian Sansom wrote that the novellas lacked story, though "What keeps the reader engaged are the Murakamian swerves, the long shots, the non sequiturs and the odd adjacencies." Another review in The Guardian, written by Hannah Beckerman, noted that "For newcomers, these early works are an excellent introduction to a writer who has since become one of the most influential novelists of his generation."

Chris Corker, reviewing the novellas for The Japan Society, said: "Murakami fans will find enough familiar elements here to feel at home, yet this is also this collection’s weakness. Murakami himself doesn’t rank these novellas very highly in his oeuvre, which is surprising for one reason: Murakami hasn’t really changed as a writer since 1979, when Hear the Wind Sing was written. You’ll find mentions of wells aplenty, as well as baseball and the other stalwarts of jazz and women with apparently alluring physical deformities. It’s in the early stages, but it is all there."

== Awards ==
- Akutagawa Prize - nominated
- Noma Literary Newcomer's Prize - nominated

== English Language Edition ==
- Murakami, Haruki (4 August 2015). Wind/Pinball: Two Novels. Translated by Ted Goossen. ISBN 978-0-385-35212-3.
