= Norwegian Wood (novel) =

1987 novel by Haruki Murakami

- First English-language edition (2000)
- Author: Haruki Murakami
- Original title: Noruwei no Mori "Norwegian Forest" ノルウェイの森
- Translator: Alfred Birnbaum (1989); Jay Rubin (2000)
- Language: Japanese
- Genre: Literary fiction, romance novel
- Publisher: Kodansha
- Publication date: 1987
- Publication place: Japan
- English publication date: 1989 (Birnbaum trans.); 2000 (Rubin trans.)
- Media type: Print (paperback)
- Pages: 296 (US paperback); 400 (UK paperback)
- ISBN: 0-375-70402-7 (US edition); ISBN 0-09-944882-3 (UK edition); ISBN 4-06-203516-2 (JP edition)
- OCLC: 42692182
- Dewey Decimal: 895.6/35 21
- LC Class: PL856.U673 N6713 2000

Norwegian Wood (ノルウェイの森, Noruwei no Mori) is a 1987 novel by Japanese author Haruki Murakami. The novel is a nostalgic story of loss. It is told from the first-person perspective of Toru Watanabe, who looks back on his days as a college student living in Tokyo. Through Watanabe's reminiscences, readers see him develop relationships with two very different women—the beautiful yet emotionally troubled Naoko, and the outgoing, lively Midori.

This novel is set in late-1960s Tokyo during a period when Japanese students, like those of many other nations, were protesting against the established order. While it serves as the backdrop against which the events of the novel unfold, Murakami (through the eyes of Watanabe and Midori) portrays the student movement as largely weak-willed and hypocritical.

Murakami adapted the first section of the novel from an earlier short story, "Firefly". The story was subsequently included in the collection Blind Willow, Sleeping Woman.

Norwegian Wood was hugely popular with Japanese youth and made Murakami something of a superstar in his native country (apparently much to his dismay at the time). During the height of the popularity, Murakami would even leave Japan for a time.

A film adaptation with the same title was released in 2010, directed by Tran Anh Hung.

== Title ==
The original Japanese title, Noruwei no Mori, is the standard Japanese translation of the title of the Beatles song "Norwegian Wood (This Bird Has Flown)". This song is often described in the novel, and is the favorite song of the character Naoko. Mori in the Japanese title translates into English as "wood" in the sense of "forest", not the material "wood", even though the song lyrics refer to the latter. Forest settings and imagery are significant in the novel.

== Characters ==
- Toru Watanabe (ワタナベ トオル, Watanabe Tōru) – The protagonist and narrator. He is a Tokyo college student of average ability, majoring in drama without reason or conviction for doing so. Unlike most students, he is interested in Western, and in particular, American literature. He was Kizuki's best friend, and develops romantic relationships with Naoko and, later, Midori.
- Naoko (直子, Naoko) – A beautiful but emotionally fragile woman who was Kizuki's girlfriend, but becomes involved with Watanabe after Kizuki's death. Naoko's older sister took her own life at age 17, which, along with Kizuki's suicide, has a lasting effect on Naoko's emotional stability and she resides in a psychiatric institution for most of the story.
- Midori Kobayashi (小林 緑, Kobayashi Midori) – A vivacious, outgoing, and provocative classmate of Watanabe. She and her sister help their absent father run a small bookstore after her mother's death from brain cancer. She originally had a boyfriend but develops feelings for Watanabe as she gets to know him more, putting Watanabe in a tough situation.
- Reiko Ishida (石田 玲子, Ishida Reiko) – A patient of the mountain asylum to which Naoko retreats. She and Naoko room together and become close friends. An accomplished pianist and guitarist, Reiko has endured lifelong mental problems that wrecked her professional musical career and later her marriage. She attempts to advise Watanabe and Naoko in their relationship.
- Kizuki (キズキ, Kizuki) – Watanabe's best friend in high school, and Naoko's first boyfriend. Kizuki took his own life when he was 17, which has a lasting effect on both Watanabe and Naoko.
- Nagasawa (永沢, Nagasawa) – A diplomacy student at the elite University of Tokyo whose friendship with Watanabe is kindled over a shared love of The Great Gatsby. Nagasawa is unusually charismatic and complex in both his ideals and personal relationships. Watanabe routinely accompanies Nagasawa on outings to bars, where they pick up girls for one-night stands. Nagasawa never seems to feel much guilt over these transgressions other than admitting that his girlfriend, Hatsumi, deserves better.
- Hatsumi (ハツミ, Hatsumi) – The long-suffering girlfriend of Nagasawa. A kind woman by nature, she tries to offer advice to Watanabe, who is reluctant to confide in her or Nagasawa. Two years after Nagasawa leaves for Germany, Hatsumi marries, only to commit suicide after another two years. News of this prompts Watanabe to end his friendship with Nagasawa.
- "Storm Trooper" (突撃隊, Totsugekitai) – Watanabe's dormitory roommate who is obsessed with cleanliness, and who is majoring in cartography in preparation for a career at the Geographical Survey Institute of Japan. His neurotic behavior is a source of annoyance and mockery among the others in the dormitory. He later moves out without warning, leaving their room entirely to Watanabe until he moves out of the dorm altogether.
- Itoh – An art student whom Watanabe meets after moving out of the dorm he shared with Nagasawa and Storm Trooper. The two share a love of Boris Vian. He has a girlfriend in his hometown of Nagasaki, but her unease about Itoh's chosen career leads him to worry about their relationship.
- Momoko "Momo" Kobayashi – Midori's elder sister.
- Mr. Kobayashi – Midori's widowed father. Midori had initially said that he had emigrated to Uruguay, but that later turns out to be a lie; Mr. Kobayashi was actually in a hospital in Tokyo, with brain cancer. When Midori and Watanabe visit him, Watanabe briefly stays to take care of him alone. He later dies, and his daughters sell the bookstore to move elsewhere.

== Plot synopsis ==
Thirty-seven-year-old Toru Watanabe is landing in Hamburg, West Germany, when he hears an orchestral cover of the Beatles song "Norwegian Wood". He is suddenly overwhelmed by feelings of loss and nostalgia. He thinks back to the 1960s, when so much happened that touched his life.

Norwegian Wood follows Watanabe, his classmate Kizuki, and Kizuki’s girlfriend Naoko, who share a close friendship. Kizuki and Naoko, in particular, see themselves as deeply connected, while Watanabe is content to remain part of their circle.

This sense of stability is shattered when Kizuki unexpectedly takes his own life on his 17th birthday. His death profoundly affects both Watanabe and Naoko: Watanabe becomes preoccupied with the presence of death, while Naoko feels as though she has lost an essential part of herself. The two grow closer, spending Sundays walking together, though their feelings remain unspoken.

On the night of Naoko’s 20th birthday, she experiences emotional vulnerability, and the two become physically intimate. Soon afterward, Naoko leaves Watanabe a letter explaining that she needs time apart and has decided to leave college to stay at a sanatorium.

These events are set against a backdrop of civil unrest. The students at Watanabe's college go on strike and call for a revolution. Inexplicably, the students end their strike and act as if nothing had happened, which enrages Watanabe as a sign of hypocrisy.

Watanabe is befriended by a fellow drama classmate, Midori Kobayashi. She is everything that Naoko is not—outgoing, vivacious, and supremely self-confident. Despite his love for Naoko, Watanabe finds himself attracted to Midori as well. Midori reciprocates his feelings, and their friendship grows during Naoko's absence. Watanabe and Midori share a special kind of relationship where both of them understand each other.

Watanabe visits Naoko at her secluded mountain sanatorium near Kyoto. There he meets Reiko Ishida, an older patient there who has become Naoko's confidante. During this and subsequent visits, Reiko and Naoko reveal more about their past: Reiko talks about the cause of her collapse into mental illness and details the failure of her marriage, while Naoko talks about the unexpected suicide of her older sister several years ago.

When he returns to Tokyo, Watanabe is distracted by his continuing thoughts about Naoko, and unintentionally alienates Midori by moving to a suburb without telling her. He writes a letter to Reiko, asking for her advice about his conflicted affections for both Naoko and Midori. He does not want to hurt Naoko, but he does not want to lose Midori either. Reiko counsels him to seize this chance for happiness and see how his relationship with Midori turns out.

A later letter informs Watanabe that Naoko has killed herself. Watanabe, grieving and in a daze, wanders aimlessly around Japan, while Midori—with whom he has not kept in touch—wonders what has happened to him. After about a month of wandering, he returns to the Tokyo area and gets in contact with Reiko, who leaves the sanatorium to come to visit. Reiko stays with Watanabe, and they hold an informal memorial service for Naoko on his rooftop. Afterward, Reiko and Watanabe have sex. It is through this experience and the intimate conversation that Watanabe and Reiko share that night, that he comes to realize that Midori is the most important person in his life. After he sees Reiko off, Watanabe calls Midori to declare his love for her. Midori asks, "Where are you now?", and the novel ends with Watanabe pondering that question.

== English translations ==
Norwegian Wood has been translated into English twice. The first translation was by Alfred Birnbaum, who translated several of Murakami's earlier novels, and was published, in Japan only, in 1989 by Kodansha as part of the Kodansha English Library series. Like other books in this pocket-sized series, the English text was intended for Japanese students of English, and the book featured an appendix listing the Japanese text for key English phrases encountered in the novel. This edition kept the two-volume division of the original Japanese version and its color scheme, the first volume having a red cover, the second green (the first UK edition in 2000 also kept this division and appearance). This earlier translation has been discontinued in Japan.

The second translation, by Jay Rubin, is the authorized version for publication outside Japan and was first published in 2000 by Harvill Press in the UK, and Vintage International in the United States.

The two translations differ somewhat. There are differences in nicknames: Watanabe's roommate, for example, is called "Kamikaze" in the Birnbaum translation, and "Storm Trooper" in the Rubin translation.

No English trade hardcover edition of the novel was published until October 2010, when an exclusive limited edition for Waterstones was released by Vintage Classics (ISBN 9780099528982).

== Reception ==
Upon release, Norwegian Wood was generally well received. Globally, the work was received generally well with Complete Review saying on the consensus "Almost (but not quite) all are very enthusiastic."

== Film adaptation ==
A film adaptation directed by Tran Anh Hung was released in Japan in 2010. The film stars Kenichi Matsuyama as Watanabe, Rinko Kikuchi as Naoko, and Kiko Mizuhara as Midori. It was presented at the 67th Venice International Film Festival. Jonny Greenwood wrote the score for the film.

Locations used in the film include the Tonomine highlands, Mineyama highlands and Kasumi coast.
