= A Wild Sheep Chase =

1982 novel by Haruki Murakami

- First edition (Japanese)
- Author: Haruki Murakami
- Original title: Hitsuji o meguru bōken (羊をめぐる冒険)
- Translator: Alfred Birnbaum
- Language: Japanese
- Genre: Surreal novel, magical realism
- Publisher: Kodansha International
- Publication date: October 15, 1982
- Publication place: Japan
- English publication date: December 31, 1989
- Media type: Print (Hardcover)
- Pages: 299 (US); 405 (JP)
- ISBN: 0-87011-905-2 (US); ISBN 4-06-200241-8 (JP)
- OCLC: 19670739
- Dewey Decimal: 895.6/35 20
- LC Class: PL856.U673 H5713 1989
- Preceded by: Pinball, 1973
- Followed by: Dance Dance Dance

A Wild Sheep Chase (羊をめぐる冒険, Hitsuji o meguru bōken; lit. 'An Adventure Concerning Sheep')) is the third novel by Japanese author Haruki Murakami. First published in Japan in 1982, it was translated into English in 1989. It is an independent sequel to Pinball, 1973, and the third book in the so-called "Trilogy of the Rat". It won the 1982 Noma Literary Newcomer's Prize.

While the original story of A Wild Sheep Chase was set in the 1970s, translator Alfred Birnbaum and Kodansha editor Elmer Luke wanted a story that was more contemporary and also appealed to American readers. In the novel, Murakami blends elements of American and English literature with Japanese contexts, exploring post-WWII Japanese cultural identity. The book is part mystery and part magical realism with a postmodern twist.

A Wild Sheep Chase has been defined as a parody or a renewal of Yukio Mishima's Natsuko no Bōken (夏子の冒険; Natsuko's Adventure).

== Plot summary ==
This quasi-detective tale follows an unnamed, chain-smoking narrator and his adventures in Tokyo and Hokkaido in 1978. The story begins when the recently divorced protagonist, an advertisement executive, publishes a photo of a pastoral scene sent to him in a confessional letter by his long-lost friend, 'Rat.' In the letter, Rat asks him to return to their hometown and give a belated goodbye on his behalf to J, the owner of the bar the two used to frequent, and a woman he was romantically involved with. The narrator fulfills the favor, in the process discovering that J's bar has moved from its former dingy basement into a modern building, and that the sea had been paved over for new development.

Months later, the narrator's business partner is contacted by a mysterious man representing 'The Boss,' a central force behind Japan's political and economic elite, who is now slowly dying due to health issues. At his request, the narrator is driven to the Boss's estate in a limo, befriending the religious chauffeur along the way. At the estate, the Boss' secretary tells the narrator that his agency must immediately cease publication of the photo. He also explains that a strange sheep with a star-shaped birthmark, pictured in the advertisement, was in some way the secret source of the Boss' power and that he has one month to find that sheep or his career and life will be ruined. After some deliberation and preparation, the narrator and his girlfriend, who possesses magically seductive and supernaturally perceptive ears, decide to travel to the north of Japan to find the sheep and his vagabond friend.

Throughout the novel, there is a dual storyline concerning the whereabouts of the Rat; who had been moving around the country, doing a variety of odd jobs and exploring whatever town that he had happened to travel to. The Rat held limited correspondence with the narrator through letters.

After giving his elderly cat to the Boss' chauffeur to watch while he is gone, the narrator and his girlfriend fly to Sapporo to begin their hunt for the landscape and sheep in the photo. There the narrator's girlfriend digs through various texts in the library and they explore the city. The girlfriend's ears help to guide them to the Dolphin Hotel which is a shadow of its former self. It is run by a man who was once a sailor, but, due to an accident at sea, has only the use of one arm. The hotel owner points the pair to his father, the 'Sheep Professor', who is a bitter, eccentric man living upstairs in the hotel, still remembering the sheep from when he encountered them in Manchuria, decades before. The hotel owner and his father have a horrible relationship, and the Sheep Professor is reluctant, at first, to talk to anyone that his son brought, until the narrator mentions the sheep to the Sheep Professor.

The Sheep Professor tells them of his encounter with the star-backed sheep and the obsession he still holds to find it again. It is the tip from the Sheep Professor that leads them to an isolated sheep farm, tended to by a man who is familiar with a man who matches the Rat's physical description and knows the trail to the pasture where the sheep are brought to graze each summer. With his help, the narrator and his girlfriend walk the trail that leads to the house. Inside there is nothing but antique furniture, dust, supplies and a barely used car in the garage. The narrator prepares to wait until the inhabitant of the house arrives, figuring that it would be the Rat or the sheep itself.

While the narrator naps, his girlfriend makes a stew, which is done by the time the narrator awakes. However, his girlfriend abruptly leaves the house while he is asleep. The narrator is tempted to start back to town to look for her but quickly dismisses this.

After over a week of waiting at the manor, the narrator runs out of smokes and decides to quit. He lives an isolated life of waiting, reading, cooking, morning jogs, and sipping whiskey waiting for the Rat, whom he correctly guesses to be the new host of the sheep. In this time, he encounters the Sheep Man, a peculiar four-foot character who seems to be a man dressed in a sheep costume. The Sheep Man asks for a drink and tells the narrator that his girlfriend is okay and was not harmed when she left. The narrator begs him to help to give a hint on the whereabouts of the Rat, to no avail.

In darkness, the narrator encounters a familiar voice, the Rat's. Sharing a beer together, the Rat starts to answer the narrator's various questions. The house had belonged to his father, and had been a vacation home purchased from the US government for cheap, after they failed to turn the land into a radar station. They leased the land and sheep pastures to the town, and still do. The Rat, feeling nostalgia of happier times and feeling estranged from his family, encountered the sheep journeying back to the house, after hearing the Sheep Professor's story of the sheep and seemingly being drawn to the house. The Rat also informs the narrator that he killed himself over a week before the narrator arrived, hanging himself in the kitchen and the Sheep Man burying him on the property; destroying the sheep (due to the sheep being inside of him) before the sheep could fully control him and preventing the sheep from taking another body. They say their final goodbyes, promising to see each other again.

With the mystery solved and questions answered, the narrator walks away from the house. The Boss' assistant encounters the narrator and pays him a generous sum, telling him that his company has been dissolved as well. The Boss' representative allows the narrator to use his car and its driver to return to town. As the narrator returns to town, the driver informs him that his cat has grown fat and that the number to god's phone doesn't seem to work anymore.

The narrator visits his old friend J's bar. He gives J the entire sum of the check from the Boss's assistant, therefore investing in the business with the condition of returns and that the Rat and he would always be welcomed with drinks in the establishment.

== Characters ==
Protagonist: The protagonist of this novel is the typical narrator of Haruki Murakami's stories. He is sent out on a journey to Hokkaido to find a special sheep with a birthmark in the shape of a star. In Japanese he is called 僕 (boku), a form of I used by young men and boys.

The Girlfriend: The protagonist sought her out after seeing a photo of her ears. He has some kind of fascination with her ears. She usually covers them with her hair. Even though her ears work perfectly fine, she says that they are "blocked" and "dead". She joins the protagonist on his journey to find the sheep, but she was driven out of the Rat's residence in Hokkaido by the Sheep Man.

The Boss: The Boss is one of the people that got possessed by the special sheep. He built an "underground kingdom" after being possessed by the sheep, but he is about to die because of large cyst in his brain after the sheep left him.

The Secretary: The Boss's secretary is the one who sought out the protagonist and ordered the protagonist to find the special sheep.

The Chauffeur: The Chauffeur frequently uses the God's telephone number that he received from the Boss. He also gave the phone number to the protagonist and encouraged him to use it. The Chauffeur names the protagonist's nameless cat, Kipper, and becomes the cat's caregiver while the protagonist sets outs on his journey.

J: J is a close friend of the protagonist and the Rat. J owns three bars, which is where the protagonist and the Rat usually go to drink. Known in Japanese as ジェイ (Jei).

The Ainu Youth: The Ainu youth is from Sapporo, and he helped a group of Japanese farmers establish a new settlement that will eventually be called Junitaki Village, where the Protagonist finds the Rat and his residence.

The Rat: The Rat is the protagonist's friend. He sent two letters to the protagonist. It was revealed that the Rat was the last person who got possessed by the sheep. In order to prevent the sheep from controlling other people, the Rat committed suicide when the sheep was asleep inside of him.

The Sheep Man: The Sheep Man showed up one day in the Rat's residence in rural Hokkaido while the Protagonist was staying in the Rat's empty home. The Sheep Man is short and talks fast. He exhibits the Rat's habit of looking at his hands. The protagonist later exposed the Sheep Man as the Rat in disguise.

Sheep Professor: The Sheep Professor is the Dolphin Hotel owner's father. He was very academically successful, and he was chosen to work on sheep agriculture for the Japanese army. However he was dismissed because of his involvement with sheep. The sheep professor was the first character in the story to be possessed by the special sheep.

Dolphin Hotel Owner: The Dolphin Hotel Owner connects the protagonist to his father, the Sheep Professor, when the protagonist and his girlfriend were staying at his hotel. The Dolphin Hotel owner said he named his hotel after the dolphins from Moby Dick.

== Reception ==
=== Initial ===
A Wild Sheep Chase received praise from Western literary critics, who found it bold and innovative in the context of Japanese fiction. In 1989, Herbert Mitgang of The New York Times Book Review credited the author with an "offbeat sense of humor and style", and said the book had interesting characters. He praised Murakami's ability to "strike common chords between the modern Japanese and American middle classes, especially the younger generation, and to do so in stylish, swinging language. Mr. Murakami's novel is a welcome debut by a talented writer who should be discovered by readers on this end of the Pacific."

A reviewer in Publishers Weekly argued, "With the help of a fluid, slangy translation, Murakami emerges as a wholly original talent." In a review of Murakami's following novel for the London Review of Books, Julian Loose said that A Wild Sheep Chase shows Murakami's "characteristically daft but deft mixture of inconsequence and genre-play". Loose also argued that it has "markedly more narrative drive [than the previous two novels]. Murakami's talent for small and large-scale musings [...] is at its most effective when rubbing up against a thriller's no-nonsense insistence on cause and effect."

Conversely, Foumiko Kometani stated in Los Angeles Times that the novel "evidences both his celebrated flair and his characteristic weaknesses". While praising him as "immensely readable", she complained that the book lacks mystery and suspense until around halfway through, and also wrote, "I am not sure anyone in Japan ever has talked the way Murakami's characters do [...] [Murakami] seems more interested in imitation than in substance, in appearance and image than in reality."

Murakami recalls that the editors of Gunzo, a Japanese literary magazine that had previously published his works, "didn't like A Wild Sheep Chase at all" because it was unorthodox for novels of the time. Popular reception, however, was positive and he credits this as his "real starting point" as a novelist.

=== Retrospective ===
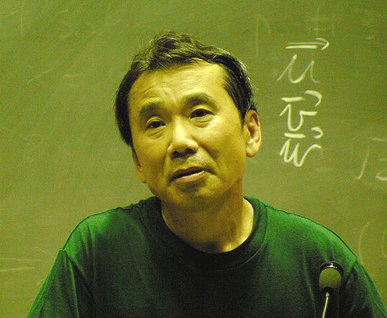
Murakami in 2005

Today, A Wild Sheep Chase is often viewed as Murakami's first substantial work. In 2014, Matthew C. Stretcher of Publishers Weekly selected it as his favorite book by the author, writing that Hokkaido is the setting of some of the "most interesting" parts of it. English professor Lowry Pei described the novel as the one in which Murakami "found the road he has been on ever since", due to tighter structuring and a protagonist who is more comfortable with expressing himself. In 2017, Bustle's Melissa Ragsdale listed A Wild Sheep Chase as one of the five best Murakami books to start with, recommending it the most for readers who enjoy thrillers.

The following year, Jeff Somers ranked it fourth among the novelist's books, arguing that "the sheer joy Murakami seems to take in telling [the story] shines through [...] by the end it deepens into a beautiful, deeply sad story of trauma and lost things. It's a breathtaking achievement, demonstrating the precise control Murakami has over tone and ideas". It was also ranked third among his books on Reedsy, where a writer noted that the book "is often recommended as a stepping stone for readers new to Murakami's writing, because the story is less of a labyrinth than many of his others." The reviewer said the book manages to be both "complex and accessible".

On the other hand, novelist Francie Lin wrote in 2001 that "A Wild Sheep Chase, in spite of its deadpan charm, is to my mind the least interesting of his novels, largely because it appears to rocket along without any real feeling beneath the gyrations of wit and intellect." She stated that it had "jump-cut pacing and sketchy characterization". Keith Law wrote in 2011 that the novel was lesser than The Wind-Up Bird Chronicle and Kafka on the Shore, but he praised its plot. Law described the payoff as "a little underwhelming. The physical plot was resolved, but the philosophical questions and answers remained vague. [...] his best works provide more clarity without devolving into sermons." Vulture's Hillary Kelly deemed the novel one of Murakami's six "forgettable" works, writing that "this rambling detective story is mostly the splatters of a thousand zany ideas thrown against the page. Dollops of Americana in a Japanese novel that felt fresh at the time now read as a little forced."

== Prequels and sequel ==
This is the third book in Murakami's '"The Rat" Trilogy', preceded by Hear the Wind Sing and Pinball, 1973. All three books follow the sometimes surreal adventures of an unnamed first-person narrator and his friend, nicknamed 'The Rat'.

All three novels begin from or refer back to November 25, 1970, the day on which Japanese author, poet, playwright and right-wing activist Yukio Mishima committed seppuku following a failed coup attempt at the headquarters of Japan's Self Defense Forces. Some Japanese critics have speculated that A Wild Sheep Chase is a rewriting or parody of Mishima's The Adventure of Natsuko.

The sequel, Dance, Dance, Dance, continues the adventures of the unnamed protagonist. Locations and characters from A Wild Sheep Chase recur, most notably the Dolphin Hotel, the narrator's unnamed girlfriend, and the mysterious Sheep Man. However, its plot, tone, and the majority of the characters are sufficiently different so that Dance Dance Dance can be seen as separate from the "Trilogy of the Rat."

== Style ==
A Wild Sheep Chase has been described as "a postmodern detective novel in which dreams, hallucinations and a wild imagination are more important than actual clues." Mitgang billed it as "youthful, slangy, political and allegorical"; he also argued that despite Murakami's knowledge of American literature and popular music, the novel is ultimately rooted in modern Japan because of "its urban setting, yuppie characters and subtle feeling of mystery, even menace". The writing style has been called hardboiled, as well as "staccato".

== Interpretation ==
In an article published by Manusya: Journal, the author claimed that the structure of the novel and lack of resolution creates a Labyrinth experience for the readers. The ending is open ended and allows for a cycle of various interpretations, similar to a labyrinth. The following are different interpretations that scholars have come up with:

- Some scholars used leadership studies to analyze the role of the sheep. The Boss was just a regular person in Junitaki village before being possessed by the sheep, but he reached the top of society after being possessed by the sheep. The authors interpreted the sheep as a magical being that bestows the qualities of a strong leader on the characters.
- Another scholar argued that the sheep represents the consumerism that overtook Japan after the postwar period, and that the characters in the novel must struggle against it to form their own individual identities.
- Another scholar argued that Murakami's story is generally written in the magical realism genre, and each character reflects Murakami's own search for identity along with the characters. Both the Boss and the Sheep Professor were basically immobile after the sheep has left them, which symbolizes that the sheep took a part of their identities. In the case of the Rat, he tried to keep his own identity even though he recognizes his own weaknesses by killing himself while the sheep was sleeping inside of him. In doing so, the wild sheep chase comes to an end, and the protagonist is left to reflect on his own inner self.

Hokkaido has been interpreted alternately as the hero's inner mind and a mythological land of the dead.

In a 2009 article for The New Yorker, Jon Michaud singled out one exchange in the 26th chapter for its multiple references to Herman Melville's Moby-Dick. Michaud said that, as with Melville's novel, elements of Murakami's novel are proxies for "the reader chasing meaning among the red herrings of a novel's text."

== Awards ==
- 1982 Noma Literary Newcomer's Prize

== Book information ==
A Wild Sheep Chase (English edition) by Haruki Murakami; translated by Alfred Birnbaum.

- Hardcover – ISBN 0-87011-905-2, published in October, 1989 by Kodansha International
- Paperback – ISBN 0-452-26516-9, published on November 1, 1990, by Plume Fiction
- Paperback – ISBN 0-375-71894-X, published in 2002 by Vintage International
