= Hard-Boiled Wonderland and the End of the World =

1985 novel by Haruki Murakami

- Cover of the first Japanese edition
- Author: Haruki Murakami
- Original title: 世界の終りとハードボイルド・ワンダーランド; Sekai no Owari to Hādo-Boirudo Wandārando
- Translator: Alfred Birnbaum (1991); Jay Rubin (2024)
- Language: Japanese
- Genre: Speculative fiction; Science fiction; Surrealism
- Publisher: Shinchosha (JP); Kodansha International (US)
- Publication date: June 1985
- Publication place: Japan
- English publication date: September 1991 (Birnbaum trans.); December 2024 (Rubin trans.)
- Media type: Print (hardcover)
- Pages: 618 (JP); 400 (Birnbaum trans.); 488 (Rubin trans.)
- ISBN: 4-10-600644-8 (JP); 4-7700-1544-5 (US)
- OCLC: 24009283
- Dewey Decimal: 895.6/35 20
- LC Class: PL856.U673 S4513 1991

Hard-Boiled Wonderland and the End of the World (世界の終りとハードボイルド・ワンダーランド, Sekai no Owari to Hādo-Boirudo Wandārando) is a 1985 novel by Japanese author Haruki Murakami. It was awarded the Tanizaki Prize in 1985. The English translation by Alfred Birnbaum was released in 1991. An unabridged translation by Jay Rubin, titled End of the World and Hard-Boiled Wonderland was released December 2024. A strange and dreamlike novel, its chapters alternate between two narratives—"Hard-Boiled Wonderland" (the cyberpunk, science fiction part) and "The End of the World" (the surreal, virtual fantasy part).

== Plot summary ==
The story is split between parallel narratives. The odd-numbered chapters take place in "Hard-Boiled Wonderland", although that phrase is not used anywhere in the text, only in page headers. The narrator is a "Calcutec" (計算士, keisanshi), a human data processor and encryption system who has been trained to use his subconscious as an encryption key. The Calcutecs work for the quasi-governmental System, as opposed to the criminal "Semiotecs" (記号士, kigōshi) who work for the Factory and who are generally fallen Calcutecs. The relationship between the two groups is simple: the System protects data while the Semiotecs steal them, although it is suggested that one man might be behind both. The narrator completes an assignment for a mysterious scientist, who is exploring "sound removal". He works in a laboratory hidden within an anachronistic version of Tokyo's sewer system. The narrator eventually learns that he only has a day and a half before his consciousness leaves the world he knows and delves forever into the world that has been created in his subconscious mind. According to the scientist, to the outside world this change will seem instantaneous, but in the Calcutec's mind, his time within this world will seem almost infinite.

The even-numbered chapters deal with a newcomer to "The End of the World", a strange, isolated Town, depicted in the frontispiece map as being surrounded by a perfect and impenetrable wall. The narrator is in the process of being accepted into the Town. His Shadow has been "cut off" and this Shadow lives in the "Shadow Grounds" where he is not expected to survive the winter. Residents of the Town are not allowed to have a shadow, and, it transpires, do not have a mind. The narrator is assigned quarters and a job as the current "Dreamreader": a process intended to remove the traces of mind from the Town. He goes to the Library every evening where, assisted by the Librarian, he learns to read dreams from the skulls of unicorns. These "beasts" passively accept their role, sent out of the Town at night to their enclosure, where many die of cold during the winter. It gradually becomes evident that this Town is the world inside the subconscious of Hard-Boiled Wonderland's narrator (the password he uses to control different aspects of his mind is even "end of the world"). The narrator grows to love the Librarian while he discovers the secrets of the Town, and although he plans to escape the Town with his Shadow, he later goes back on his word and allows his Shadow to escape the Town alone.

The two storylines converge, exploring concepts of consciousness, the subconscious or unconscious mind, and identity.

In the original Japanese, the narrator uses the more formal first-person pronoun watashi to refer to himself in the Hard-Boiled Wonderland narrative and the more intimate boku in the End of the World narrative. Translator Alfred Birnbaum achieved a similar effect in English by writing the End of the World sections in the present tense.

Popular music and jazz figure prominently in many of Murakami's stories.

The reference to "The End of the World" is obvious in Japanese editions of the novel because an epigraph quotes from the lyrics and credits for the song are appended at the end. For some reason, however, neither epigraph nor credits are included in the English translation, which obscures the musical reference and has led one critic to mistakenly identify the song as originating with the Carpenters in the 1970s.

Given that lost love is one of Murakami's major themes and that Murakami likes to play metafictionally with such allusions (the credits at the end of the Japanese edition of the novel also contain a spurious reference to a book translated into Japanese by one "Makimura Hiraku"—an anagram of Murakami's name), the removal of the explicit reference to the song is puzzling.

== Characters ==
In both narratives, none of the characters are named. Each is instead referred to by occupation or a general description, such as "the Librarian" or "the Big Guy."

=== Hard-Boiled Wonderland ===
The Narrator
A 35-year-old Calcutec who, aside from his unusual profession, lives the life of a typical Tokyo yuppie. Although very observant, he gives little thought to the strangeness of the world around him.
The Old Man / The Scientist
A great, yet absent-minded, scientist who hires the narrator to process information. He is researching "sound removal". He has developed a way of reading the subconscious and actually recording it as comprehensible, if unrelated images. He had the inspiration of then editing these images to embed a fictional story into the subconscious of his subjects, including the narrator. He did this by working with the System due to the attractiveness of its facilities, though he disliked working for anyone. He later goes to Finland, as said by his granddaughter, to escape.
The Chubby Girl
The 17-year-old granddaughter of the Old Man, who looks as though she is in her 30s. She is described as very overweight, yet attractive. She helps the Narrator in his journey through the sewers and decides to move in his apartment after the two worlds of his will converge.
The Librarian
The always-hungry girl who helps the narrator research unicorns and becomes his 48-hour girlfriend.
Junior and Big Boy
Two thugs who, on unknown orders, confront the narrator, leaving his apartment destroyed and inflicting a deliberately non-lethal but serious slash across his lower abdomen.
INKlings
Short for Infra-Nocturnal Kappa. Sewer-dwelling entities described as "Kappa" who have developed their own culture. They are so dangerous that the scientist lives in their realm, protected by a repelling device, to keep away from those who want to steal his data. It is said that they worship a Tilapia fish with violent tendencies (and leeches). They also do not eat fresh flesh; rather, once they catch a human, they submerge him in water for a few days to let him rot before eating him.

=== The End of the World ===
The Narrator
A newcomer to The End of the World. As an initiation into the Town, his Shadow is cut off and his eyes pierced to make him averse to daylight and give him the ability to "read dreams", his allotted task. He cannot remember his former life nor understand what has happened to him, but he knows that the answers are held in his mind, which his Shadow preserves.
The Narrator's Shadow
Apparently human in form. He retains the narrator's memory of their former life together, but he is doomed to die, separated as he is, and is harshly (but not cruelly) treated by his custodian, the Gatekeeper. Upon his death, the narrator would then cease to have a "mind". The Shadow longs to escape from the Town and be reunited with the world where he and the narrator rightfully belong.
The Gatekeeper
The guardian and maintenance foreman of The End of the World. He instructs the narrator in his duties, and keeps the narrator’s Shadow effectively a prisoner, putting him to work – disposing of dead beasts who die during winter.
The Librarian
The Town's Librarian who keeps the beasts' skulls in which the "dreams" reside. She assists the narrator in his work. She has no "mind", but her mother did, and the narrator becomes increasingly convinced that her mind is in fact only hidden, not irretrievably lost. The connection between this Librarian and the other, in Hard-Boiled Wonderland, is never made explicit, although the narrator repeatedly mentions that she looks familiar.
The Colonel
An old man, the narrator's neighbor, who provides advice and support, and nurses him when he falls sick.
The Caretaker
A young man who tends the Power Station in the Town's dangerous Woods. He is an outsider who provides a miniature accordion, a possible key in the narrator's efforts to recover his mind and memories. The Caretaker is banished to the Woods because he still has a semblance of a mind, and cannot be allowed to live within the Town.

== Influences ==
Murakami has often referred to his love of Western literature and particular admiration for hard-boiled pioneer Raymond Chandler. The Hard-Boiled Wonderland narrative owes much to American hard-boiled detective fiction, as well as to science fiction and cyberpunk.

== English Translations ==
The novel was first published in English in a translation by Alfred Birnbaum in 1991. Birnbaum’s translation cut parts of the novel amounting to about one-hundred pages. Translator Jay Rubin said of the cuts, "There were just lots of little cuts that added up to a lot of pages. One or two of the cuts were maybe three or four pages long, but most cuts were really just a few sentences at a time." Murakami requested that Rubin re-translate the novel for Waseda University’s Haruki Murakami Library to have on file. Rubin’s translation was published in 2024 under the title End of the World and Hard-boiled Wonderland.

== Critical reception ==
Hard-Boiled Wonderland and the End of the World was awarded the Tanizaki Prize in 1985. The novel has received critical acclaim both domestically and internationally, receiving praise from literary critics published in magazines such as The Japan Times. Kirkus Reviews wrote that it was "One of those rare postmodern novels that is as intellectually profound as stylistically accomplished, by a writer with a bold and original vision." Publishers Weekly said "Murakami's ingenuity and inventiveness cannot fail to intoxicate; this is a bravura performance."

Jay Rubin, who has translated many of Murakami's later works into English, said that Hard-Boiled Wonderland and the End of the World is his favorite Murakami novel and that it "is just a shock after reading the black and white, autobiographical fiction that is such the norm in Japan." Murakami himself stated that Hard-Boiled Wonderland and the End of the World is typical of his style.

A Companion to Crime Fiction describes Hard-Boiled Wonderland and the End of the World as a 'metaphysical detective story', comparing it with Kobo Abe's Inter Ice Age 4 and Andrew Crumey's Mobius Dick, 'linking apocalyptic science fiction and metaphysical detective/mystery stories through antiphonal narratives, alternating "science" and "mystery" to yield reciprocal modes of displacement.'

In The New York Times, Paul West found that the novel needed "more emotion" and "fobs us off with generics and categories" rather than seriously developing "his thematic material".

== Influences in other works ==
The End of the World narrative was one of the inspirations for Yoshitoshi Abe's Haibane Renmei, originally produced as a dōjinshi manga and later adapted as an anime series. Both works feature a city that people are not allowed to leave, with a wall, a river, a library, and a clock tower.

== Adaptations ==
In 2026, a theatrical version premiered in Tokyo, adapted for the stage by Ako Takahashi and directed by Philippe Decouflé. It then toured Japan before moving to Singapore, London, and Paris.
