= Masako Shirasu =

Japanese writer (1910–1998)

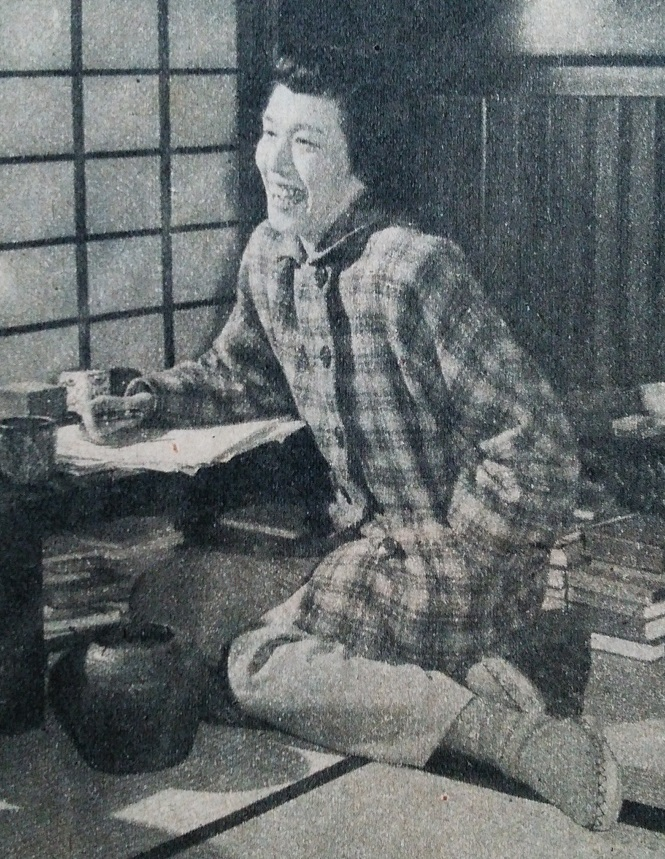
Masako Shirasu in 1952.

Masako Shirasu (白洲正子, Shirasu Masako) (January 7, 1910 – December 26, 1998) was a Japanese author and collector of fine arts. In 1924, she became the first woman to perform in the Noh theater. Her husband was the diplomat Jirō Shirasu.

== Biography ==
Shirasu was born in 1910 in the Nagatachō district of Tokyo. She was the daughter of a noble family which originally came from Satsuma. She began learning Noh at age four, and at fourteen she became the first known woman to perform a Noh play. She also studied in the United States, attending the Hartridge School in New Jersey during her teenage years. She returned to Japan in 1928 due to her father's financial troubles and married Jirō Shirasu the following year.

As an adult, Shirasu became an avid collector of Japanese antiques, particularly ceramics, and published a large number of books on the subject. She met author Hideo Kobayashi and art critic Jiro Aoyama early in her career, and both men helped develop her career and her approach to art and antiques. She has discovered a designer Issey Miyake, when he was about 20 and was unknown (according to Alex Kerr, Lost Japan, 1996). Her tastes tended towards simplicity and craftsmanship, and she was noted for finding beauty in everyday objects such as bowls and jars which had been expertly made. She also made a point of thoroughly visiting any region when studying its art, and she traveled across Japan to view and study Noh masks. In addition to antiques, she also explored nature's connection art, fashion, and Japanese cuisine, and she wrote over sixty books in her lifetime.

Shirasu died in 1998, thirteen years after her husband. Their house Buaisō later became a museum. A special exhibition dedicated to her work and memory was organised by the Miho Museum and Nihon Keizai Shinbun in December 2000.
