= Hyogo Prefectural Kobe High School =

Coordinates: 34°43′1.2″N 135°12′52.9″E

- 兵庫県立神戸高等学校
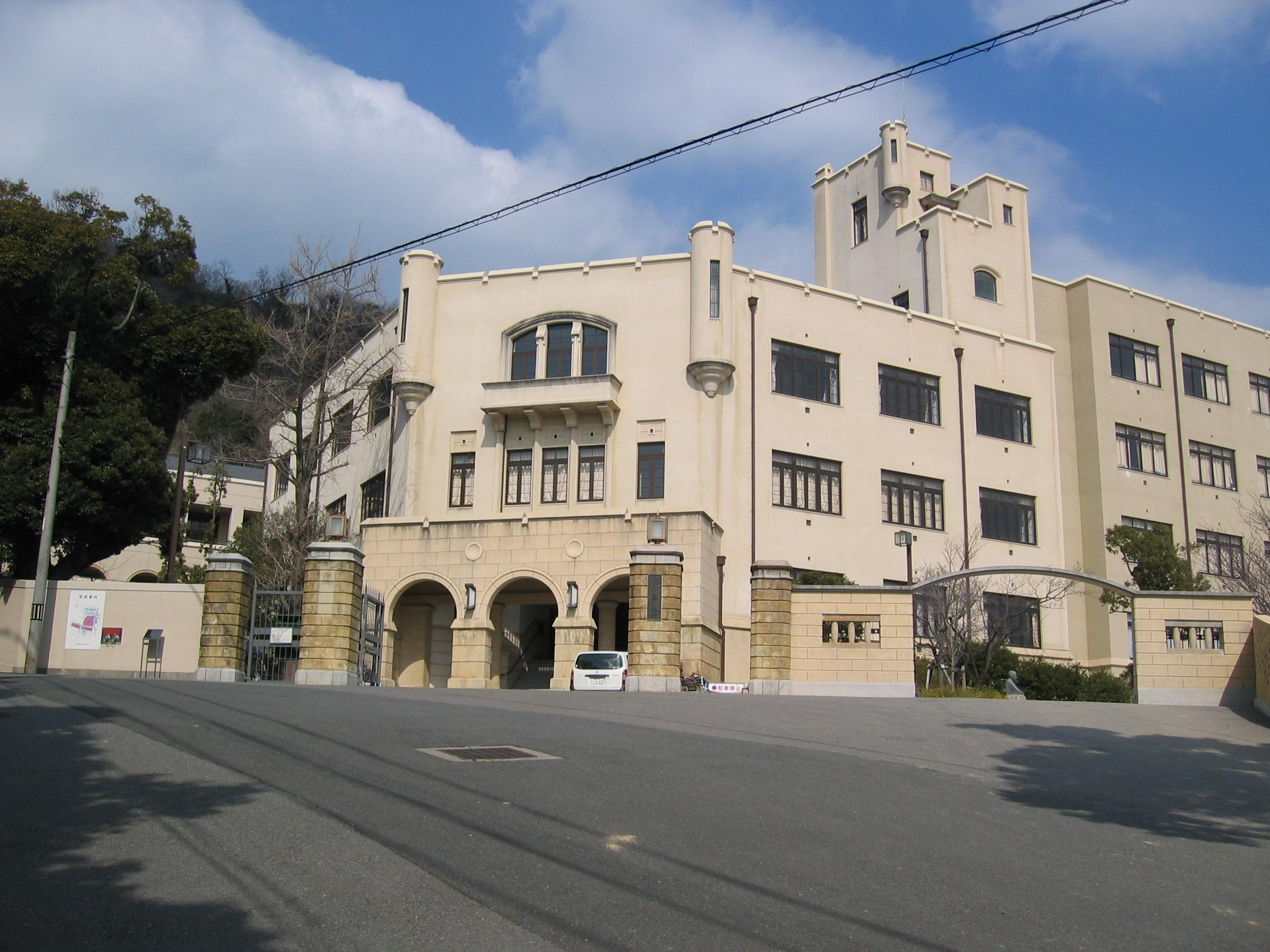
- Main Gate and Main Entrance

Location
- 1–5–1 Shironoshita-dori, Nada-ku; Kansai; Kobe, Hyōgo Prefecture 657-0804; Japan

Information
- School type: public
- Motto: 質素剛健 自重自治. (Simplicity; Strength; Independence; Self-Governance)
- Established: March 16, 1896
- Founder: Hyōgo Prefecture
- School code: 28102G
- Grades: 1–3
- Website: https://www.hyogo-c.ed.jp/~kobe-hs/

Hyogo Prefectural Kobe High School (兵庫県立神戸高等学校, Hyōgo kenritsu Kobe Kōtō Gakkō), also referred to as Kobe High School, is a high school in Kobe, Hyogo, Japan. The school is the second oldest in Hyōgo Prefecture.

== Overview ==
The school has 1076 students ranging in age from 15–18 as of June 2020. It offers both a science program (Sougourigakuka) and a general program. More than 70% of graduates get into national, prefectural and other public universities and colleges.

Focus on science:

The school has held the designation "Super Science High School" (SSH) since 2004.

Extracurricular activities:

- cultural festivals
- sports days
- music concerts

Exchange programs:

- Chatham Grammar School for Boys in England
- Raffles Institution in Singapore

== Rankings ==
Hensachi ranking is 71–77, the 2nd out of 396 High Schools in Hyōgo Prefecture, the 8th out of 10,053 in Japan

== Notable people ==
- Shigeaki Hinohara Japanese physician, grantee of the Second Prize and the Order of Culture
- Masaru Ibuka co-founder of Sony Corporation, So Yamamura is his contemporary while in the Hyogo Prefectural 1st Kobe Boys' School. "Ibuka Hall" named after him is within its campus
- Yoshitada Konoike a Japanese politician of the Liberal Democratic Party and member of the House of Councillors in the Diet
- Kyoko Matsuoka children's author and translator
- Yasuo Matsushita the 27th Governor of the Bank of Japan (BOJ), a director of the Bank for International Settlements (BIS)
- Haruki Murakami a Japanese writer who received numerous awards, including the World Fantasy Award, the Frank O'Connor International Short Story Award, the Franz Kafka Prize, and the Jerusalem Prize
- Chikage Oogi Japanese actress and politician, the first female President of the House of Councillors in 2004
- Jirō Shirasu Japanese bureaucrat and businessman
- Tadao Takashima Japanese actor and jazz musician who appeared in more than 100 films, including the Toho productions King Kong vs. Godzilla, Atragon, and Frankenstein Conquers the World and performed in stage musicals such as My Fair Lady and appeared in several television shows
- Tadao Takayama Japanese football player and educator, namely principal of Hyogo Prefectural Kobe High School, professor at Mukogawa Women's University and superintendent of education of Takarazuka City
- Yumeji Takehisa a Japanese poet and painter, known foremost for his Nihonga illustrations of bijin, beautiful women and girls
- So Yamamura a Japanese actor and film director, well known for his portrayals of Japanese Admiral Isoroku Yamamoto of the Combined Fleet, in Tora! Tora! Tora!, and of Mr. Sakamoto, the CEO of Assan Motors in Gung Ho
- Tadao Yanaihara former president of University of Tokyo, former member of Japan Academy, conferred senior grade of the third court rank and Grand Cordon in the Order of the Sacred Treasure
- Kōjirō Yoshikawa a Japanese sinologist noted for his studies of Chinese history and Classical Chinese literature, especially the Book of Documents (Shujing) and Analects of Confucius
