= Hebigami Transforms When He's Cold =

Japanese manga series

- First tankōbon volume cover

蛇神くんは寒いと変身しちゃうから (Hebigami-kun wa Samui to Henshin Shi Chaukara)
- Genre: Romantic comedy, supernatural
- Manga
- Written by: Kurimiya
- Published by: Square Enix
- English publisher: NA: Square Enix
- Imprint: Gangan Comics Pixiv
- Magazine: Gangan Pixiv; (April 12, 2025 – present)
- Original run: January 2, 2025 – present
- Volumes: 2

Hebigami Transforms When He's Cold (Japanese: 蛇神くんは寒いと変身しちゃうから, Hepburn: Hebigami-kun wa Samui to Henshin Shi Chaukara) is a Japanese manga series written and illustrated by Kurimiya. It was originally published as a one-shot on Shinchosha's Kurage Bunch manga website in September 2023. It was later published as a webcomic on the author's Twitter account in May 2024 and began serialization in January 2025. It later began serialization on the Pixiv Comic website under Square Enix's Gangan Pixiv label in April 2025.

== Synopsis ==
Hebigami is a transfer student who shapeshifts into a snake when he gets cold. Hebigami has these powers due to being a descendant of Yamata no Orochi, and is often alone due to his intimidating looks. Haruna, who sits next to him in class, lends him her blanket to keep him warm, and is the only one who interacts with him because she is aware of his true nature.

== Publication ==
Written and illustrated by Kurimiya, Hebigami Transforms When He's Cold was originally published as a one-shot on Shinchosha's Kurage Bunch manga website on September 15, 2023. It was later published as a webcomic on the author's Twitter account on May 18, 2024, and began serialization on January 2, 2025. It later began serialization on the Pixiv Comic website under Square Enix's Gangan Pixiv label on April 12, 2025. Its chapters have been compiled into two tankōbon volumes as of December 2025.

The series' chapters are published in English on Square Enix's Manga Up! Global app.

No.	Release date	ISBN
1	April 22, 2025	978-4-7575-9809-6
2	December 22, 2025	978-4-3010-0184-3

== Reception ==
The series was nominated for the twelfth Next Manga Award in 2026 in the web category.
