= Tadao Takayama =

Japanese footballer and educator

Tadao Takayama 高山 忠雄
Personal information
- Full name: Tadao Takayama
- Date of birth: June 24, 1904
- Place of birth: Tokyo, Empire of Japan
- Date of death: July 1, 1980 (aged 76)
- Place of death: Tokyo, Japan
- Position: Forward

Youth career
- Kobe Daiichi High School
- 1927–1930: Tokyo Imperial University

Senior career*
Years	Team	Apps	(Gls)
- Kobe Icchu Club

International career
1930	Japan	2	(1)
Medal record
Kobe Icchu Club
Winner	Emperor's Cup	1927
- * Club domestic league appearances and goals

Tadao Takayama (高山 忠雄, Takayama Tadao; June 24, 1904 – July 1, 1980) was a Japanese football player. He played for the Japan national team.

He was also educator, namely principal of Hyogo Prefectural Kobe High School, professor at Mukogawa Women's University and superintendent of education of Takarazuka City.

== Early life and education ==
Takayama was born in Tokyo on June 24, 1904. He grew up in Kobe. He learned soccer while he was student at the elementary school attached to Mikage Normal School in Higashinada-ku, Kobe from 1911 until 1917. He graduated from Kobe Ittchu [Kobe First Middle School] (later, Hyogo Prefectural Kobe High School) in 1922, Eighth Higher School (under the prewar education system, later, Nagoya University) and Tokyo Imperial University in 1931.

The biggest shock was the total defeat with the score of 0–8 in the friendly match held on September 22, 1919, between Kobe Icchu and Czechoslovak military team which utilized the strategy of using short passes that the students of Kobe Icchu didn't imagined. They assumed that the attack method for making a goal was the British style of using cross.

== Club career ==
He played for Kobe Icchu Club was consisted of his alma mater high school players and graduates. At the club, he won 1927 Emperor's Cup with Takeo Wakabayashi and so on.

== National team career ==
In May 1930, when Takayama was a Tokyo Imperial University student, he was selected Japan national team for 1930 Far Eastern Championship Games in Tokyo and Japan won the championship. At this competition, on May 25, he debuted against Philippines. On May 29, he also played and scored a goal against Republic of China. He played 2 games and scored 1 goals for Japan in 1930.

== After retirement ==
After retirement, Takayama worked at Ministry of Foreign Affairs and Ministry of Education, Science and Culture. He also served as a professor at Hamamatsu College of Technology and Mukogawa Women's University. In 1948, he became the principal of Hyogo Prefectural Kobe High School, his mother school. He worked for his mother school as principal for 18 years until 1965. After he retired from the position of the principal, he became professor at Mukogawa Women's University and in 1972 the superintendent of education of Takarazuka City.

On July 1, 1980, Takayama died in Tokyo at the age of 76.

== National team statistics ==
Japan national team
Year	Apps	Goals
1930	2	1
Total	2	1
