= It Takes Two Tomorrow, Too =

Japanese manga series

- First tankōbon volume cover

ふたり明日もそれなりに (Futari Ashita mo Sorenari ni)
- Genre: Romantic comedy; Slice of life
- Manga
- Written by: Suzuyuki
- Published by: Shinchosha
- English publisher: NA: One Peace Books
- Imprint: Bunch Comics
- Magazine: Kurage Bunch
- Original run: May 10, 2019 – April 23, 2021
- Volumes: 5

It Takes Two Tomorrow, Too (ふたり明日もそれなりに, Futari Ashita mo Sorenari ni) is a Japanese manga series written and illustrated by Suzuyuki. It was serialized on Shinchosha's Kurage Bunch manga website from May 2019 to April 2021.

== Synopsis ==
The series is centered around the daily lives of Yuya Aida and Rio Aihara, a couple who have been living together for at least two months.

== Publication ==
Written and illustrated by Suzuyuki, It Takes Two Tomorrow, Too was serialized from May 10, 2019, to April 23, 2021. Its chapters were collected into five tankōbon volumes released from October 9, 2019, to May 8, 2021. The series is licensed in English by One Peace Books.

No.	Original release date	Original ISBN	North American release date	North American ISBN
1	October 9, 2019	978-4-10-772217-1	October 17, 2023	978-1-64-273299-3
1. "Moving in Together — It Takes Two"; 2. "Buzzed Lover"; 3. "The Desire to Be #1"; 4. "Midnight Convenience Store Run"; 5. "Caught Fish"; 6. "I'm Going Home to My Parents'"; 7. "Home Alone"; 8. "Maybe Rain Isn't So Bad After All"; 9. "Nursing, More or Less"; 10. "The Spirit of Give or Take"; 11. "Having a Social Life Is Important Too 1"; 12. "Having a Social Life Is Important Too 2"; 13. "With Someone or Alone"; 14. "Two on a Summer's Night"; 15. "Midsummer Is for Terror"; 16. "Past and Future"; 17. "A Sudden Visit"; 18. "A New Date and Then (Takes Two)"; Bonus: "Hot Spring Trip"
2	April 9, 2020	978-4-10-772269-0	December 26, 2023	978-1-64-273300-6
19. "The Birthday Surprise"; 20. "Holding Hands"; 21. "Dinner Together"; 22. "My Lover's Type"; 23. "My Lover's Past Relationships 1"; 24. "My Lover's Past Relationships 2"; 25. "Chilly Mornings"; 26. "Not a Fan of Him 1"; 27. "Not a Fan of Him 2"; 28. "At Night at Her Parents' Place"; 29. "Having a Social Life Is Important Too 1"; 30. "Having a Social Life Is Important Too 2"; 31. "When Your Partner Has No Complaints"; 32. "Tedious Year-End Cleaning"; 33. "It Takes Two in the New Year, Too"; 34. "Matching Rings"; 35. "Ring Shopping"; 36. "My Lover's Ring Finger"; Bonus: "Merry Christmas"
3	August 6, 2020	978-4-10-772305-5	April 2, 2024	978-1-64-273333-4
37. "I Want to Talk"; 38. "For Falling in Love With Me"; 39. "My Lover's Photo"; 40. "It Takes Two to See You Later, Too"; 41. "Two Watching Over Two"; 42. "First Date"; 43. "An Invitation Out"; 44. "An Outing With the Aida Family"; 45. "A Meal With the Aida Family"; 46. "Cherry Blossom Viewing"; 47. "Busy Days"; 48. "No Matter What the Future Brings"; 49. "Why I Love Him"; 50. "Prepping for a Trip"; 51. "Because She's on Vacation"; 52. "Going Somewhere Together"; 53. "Two During Break Time"; Bonus: "Let's Take It Slow"
4	January 9, 2021	978-4-10-772354-3	June 4, 2024	978-1-64-273334-1
54. "Two on Vacation 1"; 55. "Two on Vacation 2"; 56. "Two on Vacation 3"; 57. "Its Been Yours for Ages"; 58. "Probably at Some Point"; 59. "A Summer Battle"; 60. "Today's Horoscope"; 61. "To the Beach 1"; 62. "To the Beach 2"; 63. "I'm Sure She'll Love It"; 64. "My Lover's Phone Call"; 65. "Happy and Healthy"; 66. "Hold on Tight"; 67. "Meeting at the Station 1"; 68. "Meeting at the Station 2"; 69. "Next to Me 1"; 70. "Next to Me 2"; Bonus: "We're Together"
5	May 8, 2021	978-4-10-772388-8	August 20, 2024	978-1-64-273388-4
71. "It Takes Two to Plan a Marriage"; 72. "Announcing to the Aiharas 1"; 73. "Announcing to the Aiharas 2"; 74. "That Morning Chore"; 75. "Announcing to the Aidas"; 76. "Bread-Baking Class"; 77. "Happy Birthday"; 78. "Wear What You Want"; 79. "A Warm Winter"; 80. "A Meal with the Aidas and Aiharas 1"; 81. "A Meal with the Aidas and Aiharas 2"; 82. "Cherish the Connection"; 83. "Making Lots of Memories 1"; 84. "Making Lots of Memories 2"; 85. "Time By Your Side"; 86. "Thanks"; 87. "Two Tomorrow, Too"; Bonus: "It Takes Two Ever After"

== Reception ==
The manga was one of 50 nominees for the sixth Next Manga Awards in the web category in 2020.
