= Chiiori =

Edo period minka farmhouse in the Iya Valley, Tokushima, Japan

Coordinates: 33.86255°N 133.859908°E

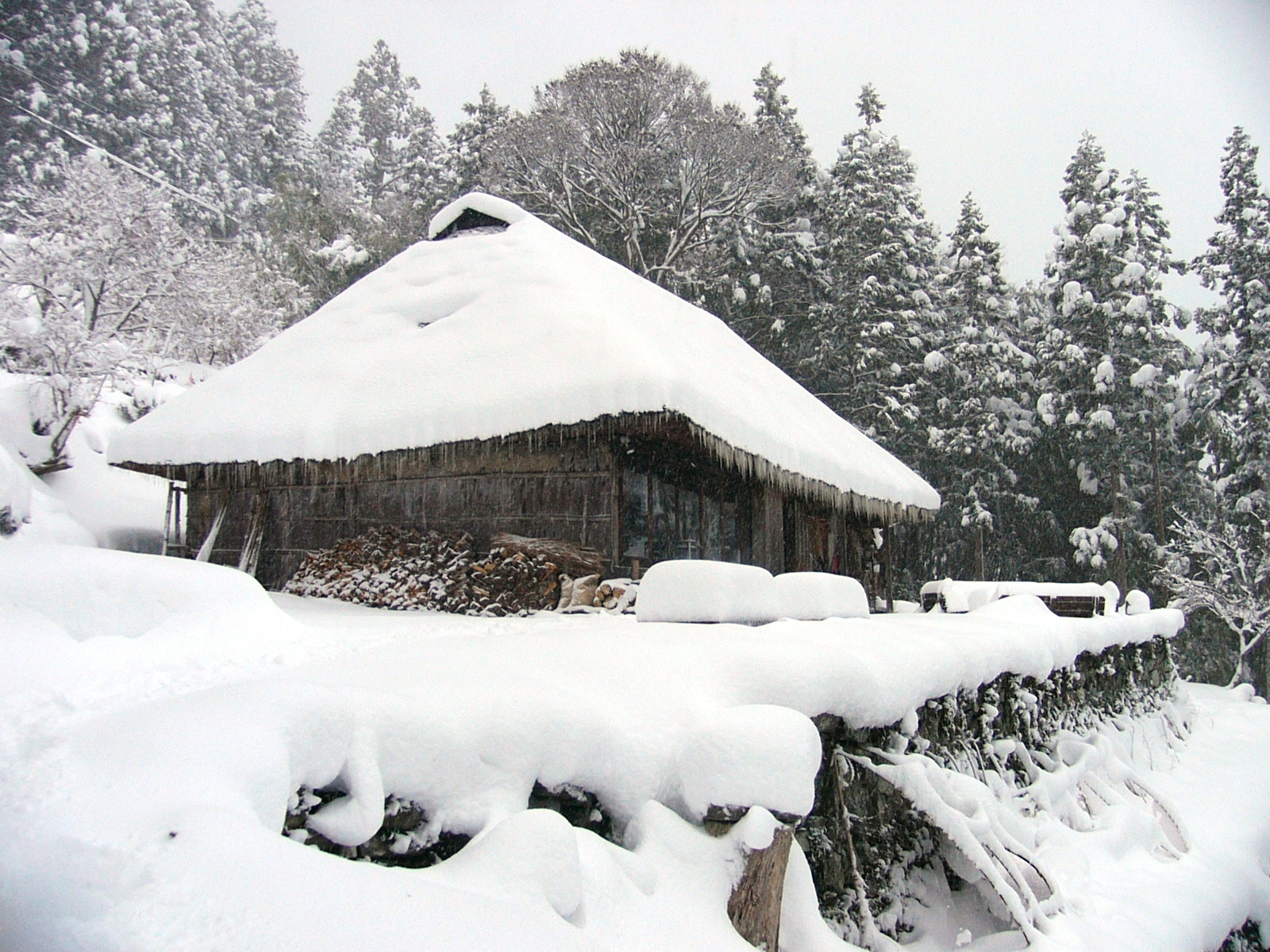
Chiiori in winter

Chiiori (篪庵; House of the Flute) is the name of an Edo period minka farmhouse in the Iya Valley, western Tokushima, Japan. Dating from around 1720, the house is believed to be the second oldest in Iya. (The oldest, nearby Kimura House, is designated an Important Cultural Property.)

== Structure ==
Chiiori preserves its original structure, irori (囲炉裏; floor hearths), and pine floors blackened by hundreds of years of smoke from the irori. The house is unusual for farm houses in Japan because there are no ceilings, except over the small sleeping rooms. This was because for much of the Edo period, tobacco was a leading crop of Iya, and villagers used to hang the tobacco up in the rafters to smoke over the irori. Due to the lack of ceilings, Chiiori has a dramatic wide-open interior.

== Since 1973 ==
Purchased by American writer and Japanologist Alex Kerr in 1973, Chiiori features in Kerr's book Lost Japan. Originally there was no road up to the house, so the only access was to walk an hour from the Iya River road below. Today there's a winding one-lane road access to the house. It is now the center of Chiiori Trust, a non-profit organization based in Iya Valley that is working toward solutions to the problems surrounding depopulation in rural Japan, and Chiiori Alliance, a company dedicated to the same goals.

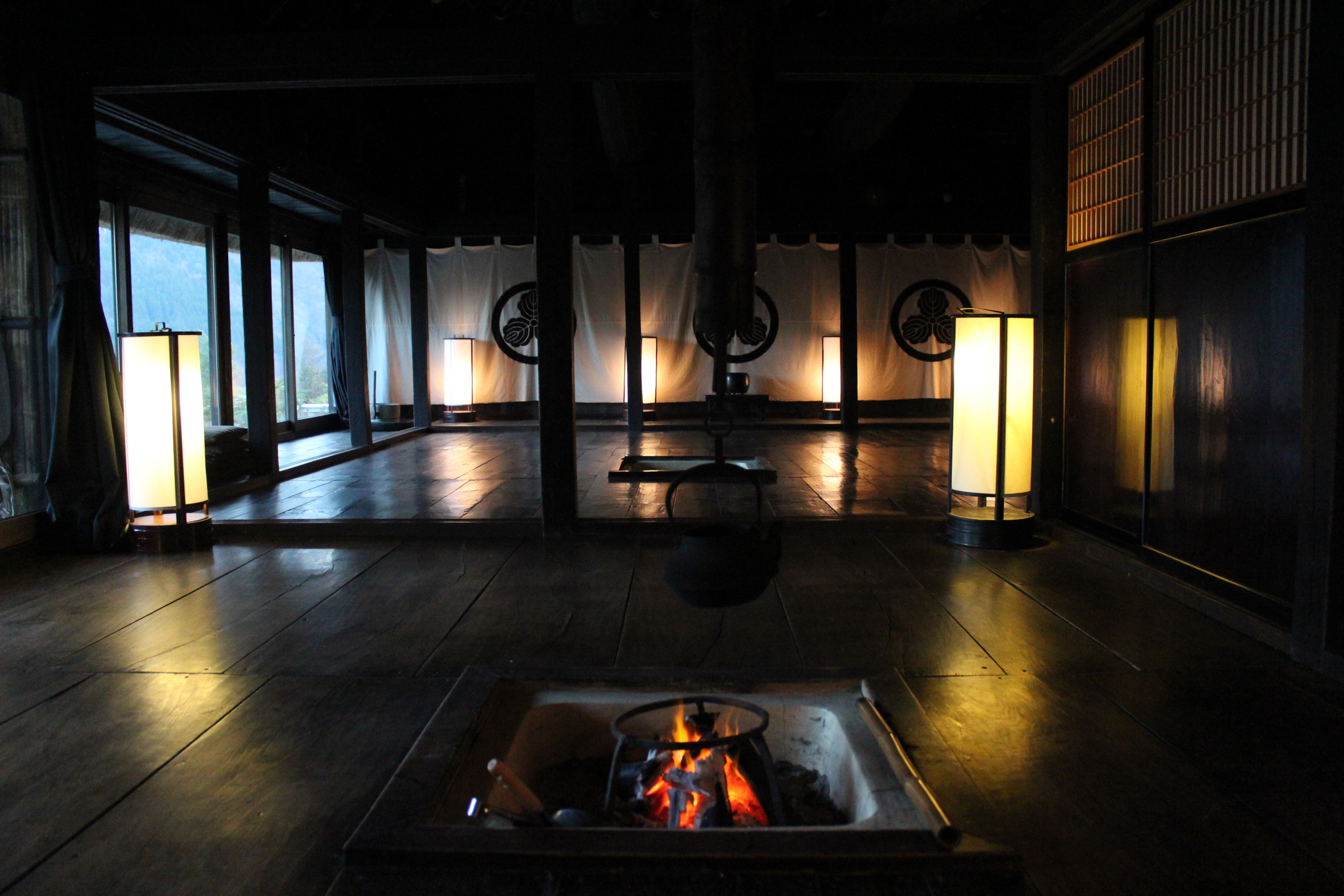
Interior of Chiiori

From 1997 to 2007, Kerr shared ownership of Chiiori with Mason Florence. In the summer of 2007, Kerr bought back Florence's share; since then, Kerr and the Chiiori Trust/Chiiori Alliance have managed the house.

In 2012, Chiiori underwent a major restoration. Over the course of a year, the roof was re-thatched, walls and underfloor structure redone with damage repaired, earthquake protection incorporated, and amenities built in, such as plumbing, bath, toilets, lighting, and heating systems etc. However, most of these changes are invisible, and the thatch, irori, and old pine floors are as they have always been.

Working as a consultant for the city of Miyoshi, of which Iya is a part, Kerr went on to restore eight other thatched houses in the hamlet of Ochiai located further up the valley from Chiiori. Today, Chiiori Alliance manages all nine houses as lodgings for travelers and spaces for cultural events.
