= Lost Japan =

1993 book by Alex Kerr

- 2004 edition cover
- Author: Alex Kerr
- Language: Japanese, English
- Genre: History, Japan
- Publisher: Shinchosha, Lonely Planet
- Publication date: 1993 (Japanese), 1996 (English)
- Publication place: Japan, United States
- Media type: Print, e-book
- Pages: 269 pp.
- ISBN: 978-0-86442-370-2
- OCLC: 951481922

Lost Japan (美しき日本の残像, Utsukushiki Nihon no Zanzo) is a 1993 book written by American Japonologist Alex Kerr.

== Background ==
The book deals with Kerr's life in Japan, and on aspects of Japanese culture by which he was fascinated. The text is a collection of personal essays, in which he suggests that the current popularity of ikebana, kabuki, and other famous Japanese arts and crafts represents the final efflorescence of a moribund culture. He wrote it in Japanese, and it was translated into English with the help of Bodhi Fishman, and published as Lost Japan in 1996.

The original Japanese version was published by Shinchosha in 1993; a paperback version has been published since 2000 by The Asahi Shimbun Company. The English translation was first published by Lonely Planet in 1996; in 2015 the book was reissued by Penguin UK with a new preface written by Alex.

Translations have also been published in Traditional and Simplified Chinese characters, Italian, Polish, Russian, and Spanish.

== Reception ==
The book won the Shincho Gakugei literature award in 1994. Kerr was the first non-Japanese winner.

Damian Flanagan of The Japan Times wrote, "A fascinating chronicle of Kerr’s diverse interactions with the country, the book spans such subjects as restoring a traditional Japanese house in the Iya Valley in Shikoku to collecting Japanese antiques often found languishing unloved in the kura (storehouses) of family homes. Kerr is superlative not only in bringing a connoisseur’s eye to the artefacts and architecture of his adopted homeland, but also in providing revelatory insights into the country in general. He provides an illuminating exploration of many hidden, magical aspects of Japanese culture from the mandala of temples studded around Nara to the ancient brothel district of Tobita in southern Osaka."

== Chapters ==
1. Looking for a Castle
2. Iya Valley - the author purchases and repairs Chiiori
3. Kabuki - the author describes 1977 Minami-za theatre shows and meeting then 65-year-old Nakamura Jakuemon IV, an onnagata dancer
4. Art Collecting - the author describes collecting centuries-old calligraphy cheaply
5. China versus Japan
6. Calligraphy
7. Tenmangu (after the Ōsaka Tenmangū Shrine)
8. Trammell Crow - the author describes his job as an art collector for the American real estate developer
9. Kyoto
10. The Road to Nara
11. Outer Nara
12. Osaka
13. The Literati - the author compares Oxford All Souls' Warden John Sparrow as Western literati with the educated leisure class of Japan
14. Last Glimpse
