= Foresight (magazine) =

Japanese news magazine

- Categories: Politics, News
- Frequency: Monthly
- Publisher: Shinchosha
- First issue: March 1990
- Final issue: 2010 (print)
- Country: Japan
- Based in: Tokyo
- Language: Japanese
- Website: fsight.jp

Foresight (フォーサイト fuŏ̄saito) is one of the most influential news magazine in Japan published by Shinchosha. The magazine focusses on Japanese politics, economic issues, as well as Asian and international politics. The readers varies from business executives, academia, to politicians.

== History and profile ==
Foresight was first published in 1990 and covers mainly politics. The print edition was initially only available by subscription. It started the online magazine in 2010, having stopped its print. The majority of the content is only available via subscription.

Since the early days of the print media, the magazine's strength has been its unique information and analysis of international politics and economics, such as its early introduction of Al-Qaeda's Osama bin Laden as a dangerous figure before the September 11, 2001 terrorist attacks in the United States and its early warning against subprime loans, which triggered the "Lehman Brothers Shock".

In the year 2024, the magazine features insightful articles authored by distinguished Japanese academics, journalists, and former diplomats. The content delves into significant global issues, including the Russo-Ukrainian War, the nuclear challenges associated with North Korea, and the intricacies of Middle East geopolitics, such as Abraham Accords, the normalization agreement between Israel and United Arab Emirates and other Arab states.

It also includes non-Japanese authors, such as Nicholas Eberstadt, Robert Legvold, Uwe Parpart, Bruce Stokes, Ingo Günther, Ethan Scheiner, Chris Kraul, Marcus Noland, Larry Wortzel, and Amanda J. Crawford.

Foresight also publishes e-books.

The magazine routinely informs about free as well as subscription-only articles via their Twitter feed.

Shigeto Uchikiba (内木場重人) was the editor-in-chief from 2017 to 2021. He was succeeded by Hirokazu Nishimura (西村博一).
