= Buaisō =

Coordinates: 35°35′22″N 139°28′39″E

- 武相荘
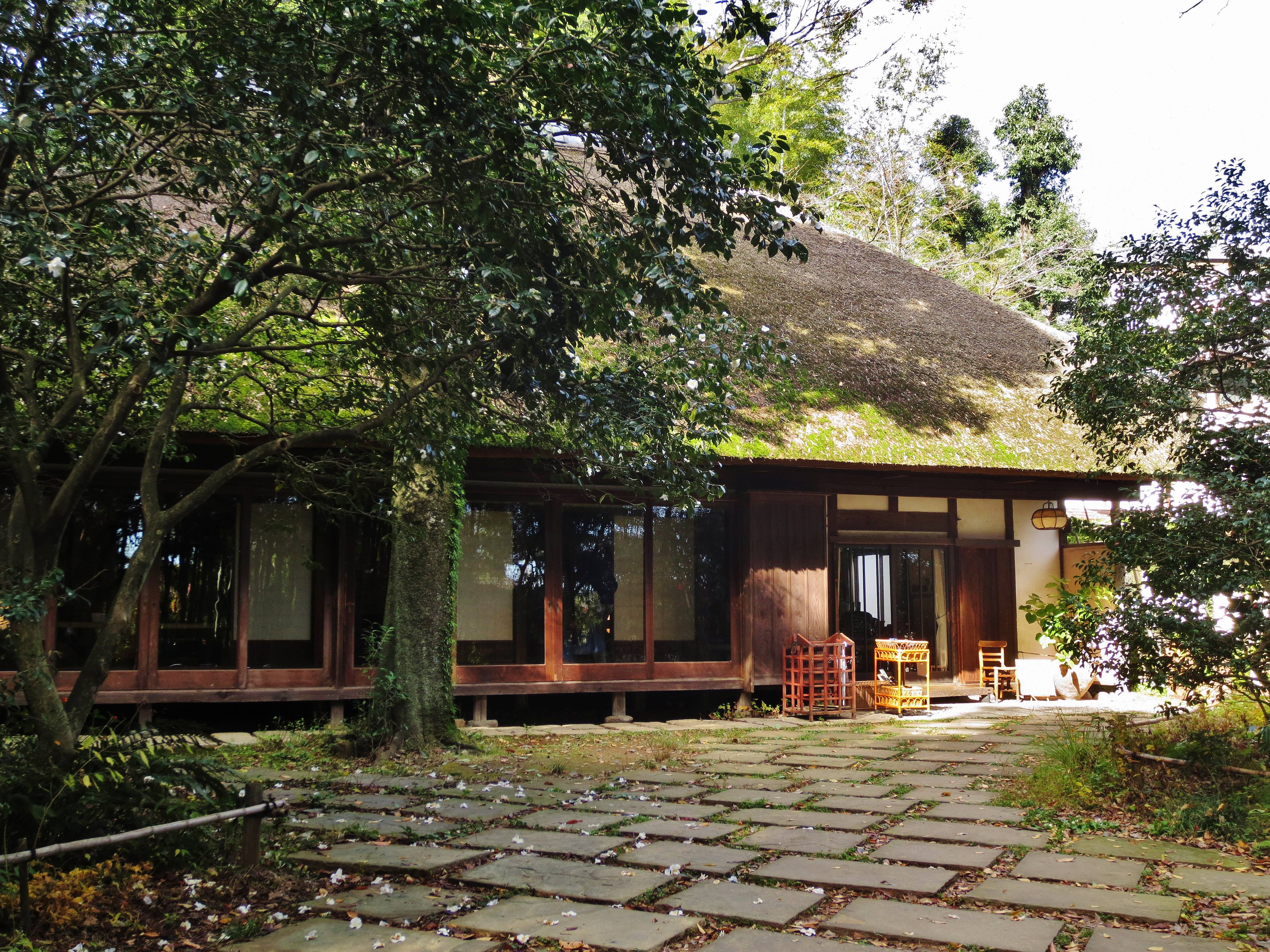
- Buaisō Museum main house
- Location: Machida, Tokyo, Japan
- Type: Historic House Museum
- Website: buaiso.com

Buaisō (武相荘) is the former home of post-war Japanese bureaucrat Jirō Shirasu and his wife Masako Shirasu, located in Machida, Tokyo, to the west of downtown Tokyo. The name was derived from an amalgamation of kanji for the former provinces of Musashi and Sagami, as its location is near the border between the two provinces.

The house was a traditional farm house, located in what was then a rural area of Minamitama District, Tokyo. It was acquired by the Shirasu family in October 1942 while Jirō Shirasu was still a businessman working for the predecessor of Nichirei Corporation. Predicting that his residence in Shinjuku in downtown Tokyo would be endangered due to the worsening war situation in World War II and to avoid possible food shortages. His foresight paid off when his Shinjuku house was destroyed in the 1945 bombing of Tokyo. In the post-war era, he continued to use the house while working with Prime Minister of Japan Shigeru Yoshida in negotiations with the American occupation authorities.

Jirō Shirasu died in 1985 and his wife in 1998. The house was preserved by the city of Machida as a memorial museum to the couple, and is kept as it appeared when they lived there, with items varying according to the seasons.

The house is a wooden structure constructed in the traditional style with a thatched roof, surrounded by Japanese gardens.
