= Jirō Shirasu =

Japanese businessman (1902–1985)

- 白洲 次郎
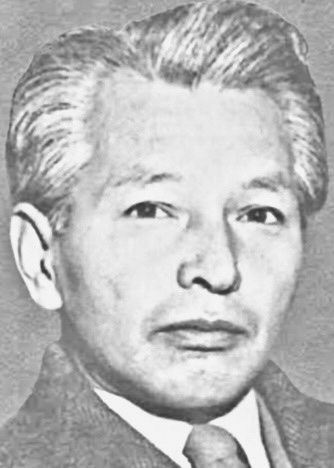
- Jirō Shirasu (From Shūkan Asahi, 1953)
- Born: 17 February 1902; Ashiya, Hyogo Prefecture, Japan
- Died: 28 November 1985 (aged 83)
- Spouse: Masako Shirasu
- Children: Katsurako Makiyama

Jirō Shirasu (白洲 次郎, Shirasu Jirō; 17 February 1902 – 28 November 1985) was a Japanese businessman and official. He was a confidant of Prime Minister Shigeru Yoshida and served as a liaison between Japanese cabinet and the Supreme Commander for the Allied Powers during the American occupation of Japan.

== Early life and education (1902–1928) ==
Jirō Shirasu was born in Ashiya in Hyogo Prefecture, on 17 February 1902, the second son of Bunpei Shirasu, a wealthy businessman. Jirō's paternal grandfather Taizō was a prominent samurai of the Sanda Domain who had supported the Meiji Restoration, later becoming a businessman and briefly president of the Yokohama Specie Bank. Taizō had been involved in the founding of the precursor of Kobe College. American teachers at the school often boarded with the Shirasu household, and Jirō Shirasu learnt English from them at a young age.

Shirasu attended Hyogo Prefectural Kobe High School and graduated in 1921. Afterwards he went to England to further his studies at Cambridge University at the urging of his father. By his own account, Shirasu was a troublemaker in his youth and him studying abroad had been arranged by his father as a form of "exile."

Shirasu enrolled in Clare College at Cambridge University in April 1923 and read medieval history. His best friend at Cambridge was Robert Cecil Byng, nephew of Edmund Byng, 6th Earl of Strafford, and later the 7th Earl. Shirasu adopted the style and manners of an English gentleman. He also cultivated a passion for cars, acquiring both a Bentley 3 Litre and a Bugatti Type 35. During winter break in 1925 he made a tour of the European continent together with Byng in his Bentley, driving down to Gibraltar and back.

Shirasu got his degree in 1926 and enrolled in graduate school, intending to become a scholar, but the Showa financial crisis caused his father’s company to go bankrupt, forcing Shirasu to return to Japan in 1928.

== Business career and war years (1928–1945) ==
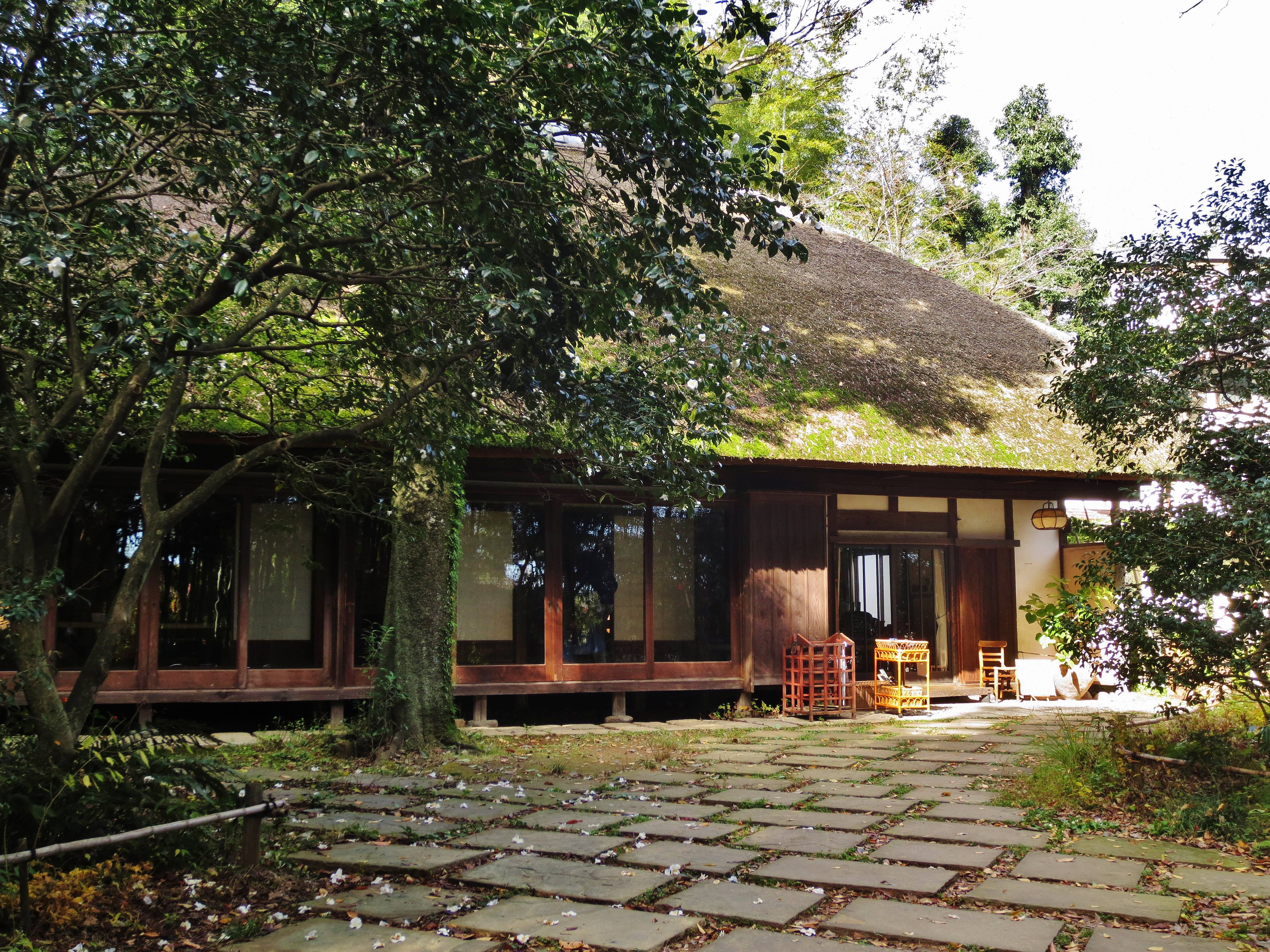
The main house of Buaisō

On his return to Japan, Shirasu began working for the English-language newspaper, the Japan Advertiser. The following year he married Masako Kabayama, daughter of Count Aisuke Kabayama. Shirasu switched from journalism to business in 1931, first working for a trading company, and later becoming a director of a fishery company in 1937.

His position required him to make frequent business trips to London. Shirasu struck up a friendship with the Japanese Ambassador at the time, Shigeru Yoshida. They were already acquainted because their respective fathers-in-law, Aisuke Kabayama and Nobuaki Makino, were good friends.

After the Pacific War broke out Shirasu predicted there would be food shortages in Tokyo. He therefore bought a farm in Tsurakawa Village on the outskirts of Tokyo. The residence was dubbed Buaisō. In 1943, Shirasu withdrew from business and devoted himself to farming for the rest of the war.

== Public service (1945–1954) ==
After the surrender, Japan came under American occupation. In December 1945, Shirasu was recruited by his friend Shigeru Yoshida, who had become foreign minister, to the Central Liaison Office. Shirasu would be liaison between the Supreme Commander for the Allied Powers and the Japanese cabinet. He is particularly remembered in Japan for an incident in Christmas 1945 where he delivered a present from Hirohito, Emperor of Japan to General Douglas MacArthur. When MacArthur told him to place it on the floor, Shirasu demanded a table to show respect. At that time, he is said to have said, "Although we were defeated in war, we didn’t become slaves."

He was promoted to deputy chief of the Central Liaison Office in March 1946. After Yoshida had become prime minister, Shirasu was concurrently appointed deputy director-general of the Economic Stabilization Board in December 1946. He left all public positions when Yoshida Cabinet ended in May 1947. After Yoshida returned to the premiership, he appointed Shirasu became director-general of the Board of Trade in December 1948. He advocated the merger of the Board with the Ministry of Commerce and Industry, forming the Ministry of International Trade and Industry in May 1949. He thereby relinquished his position.

Shirasu was chosen as the first chairman of the Tohoku Electric Power Company in May 1951.

== Later life (1954–1985) ==
Shirasu served as chairman of the Tohoku Electric Power Company until 1959. He was afterward involved in a number of other business activities while continuing to live at Buaisō.

Jirō Shirasu died on 28 November 1985, at the age of 83.

In the post-war era, his wife Masako Shirasu had become a collector and expert of fine Japanese art, on which she published a number of books. She died in 1998 and three years later their house Buaisō became a museum.

Shirasu was the subject of an NHK drama in 2009.
