= Uten Enten =

Book by Haruki Murakami

- Author: Haruki Murakami
- Original title: 雨天炎天; Uten Enten
- Language: Japanese
- Genre: Travel literature, Essay
- Publisher: Shinchosha (Japan)
- Publication date: Feb 25, 2008 (Renewal edition)
- Publication place: Japan
- English publication date: -
- Media type: Print (Paperback)
- Pages: 286 pp (Renewal edition)
- ISBN: 978-4-10-353419-8 (Renewal edition)
- OCLC: 226807811

Uten Enten (雨天炎天) is a road essay by Japanese author Haruki Murakami, about his travels in Greece and Turkey. The essays were first published in Japanese in 1990 by shinchosha as two separate volumes, the first volume covering his travels in Greece, and the other his travels in Turkey. A popular edition collecting both volumes was published in 1991. In 2008 a renewal edition was published with some new photographs.

== Contents ==
Title	Chapter
Greece: In the Holy Mountain ギリシャ編 アトス―神様のリアル・ワールド	Good bye Real World さよならリアル・ワールド
Greece: In the Holy Mountain ギリシャ編 アトス―神様のリアル・ワールド	About Athos World アトスとはどのような世界であるのか
Greece: In the Holy Mountain ギリシャ編 アトス―神様のリアル・ワールド	From Dafni to Karyes ダフニからカリエへ
Greece: In the Holy Mountain ギリシャ編 アトス―神様のリアル・ワールド	From Karyes to Stavronikita カリエからスタヴロニキタ
Greece: In the Holy Mountain ギリシャ編 アトス―神様のリアル・ワールド	Iviron Monastery イヴィロン修道院
Greece: In the Holy Mountain ギリシャ編 アトス―神様のリアル・ワールド	Philotheou Monastery フィロセウ修道院
Greece: In the Holy Mountain ギリシャ編 アトス―神様のリアル・ワールド	Karakalou Monastery カラカル修道院
Greece: In the Holy Mountain ギリシャ編 アトス―神様のリアル・ワールド	The Monastery of Great Lavra ラヴラ修道院
Greece: In the Holy Mountain ギリシャ編 アトス―神様のリアル・ワールド	To the Skete of Prodromos プロドロムのスキテまで
Greece: In the Holy Mountain ギリシャ編 アトス―神様のリアル・ワールド	Kafsokalyvia カフソカリヴィア
Greece: In the Holy Mountain ギリシャ編 アトス―神様のリアル・ワールド	Agia Anna - Good bye Athos アギア・アンナ―さらばアトス
Turkey: On the Turkish road トルコ編 チャイと兵隊と羊―21日間トルコ一周	Soldiers 兵隊
Turkey: On the Turkish road トルコ編 チャイと兵隊と羊―21日間トルコ一周	Bread and Chai パンとチャイ
Turkey: On the Turkish road トルコ編 チャイと兵隊と羊―21日間トルコ一周	Turkey トルコ
Turkey: On the Turkish road トルコ編 チャイと兵隊と羊―21日間トルコ一周	Black Sea 黒海
Turkey: On the Turkish road トルコ編 チャイと兵隊と羊―21日間トルコ一周	Hopa ホパ
Turkey: On the Turkish road トルコ編 チャイと兵隊と羊―21日間トルコ一周	Van Cat ヴァン猫
Turkey: On the Turkish road トルコ編 チャイと兵隊と羊―21日間トルコ一周	For Hakkâri ハッカリに向かう
Turkey: On the Turkish road トルコ編 チャイと兵隊と羊―21日間トルコ一周	Hakkâri 2 ハッカリ 2
Turkey: On the Turkish road トルコ編 チャイと兵隊と羊―21日間トルコ一周	Marlboro マルボロ
Turkey: On the Turkish road トルコ編 チャイと兵隊と羊―21日間トルコ一周	Nightmare of National Highway 24 国道24号線の悪夢
Turkey: On the Turkish road トルコ編 チャイと兵隊と羊―21日間トルコ一周	Along National Highway 24 国道24号線に沿って

== Additional information ==
=== Oldest edition ===
- Subtitle: In the Holy Mountain, on the Turkish road
- Photo: Eizō Matsumura, Art direction: Sakagawa, Design: Maeda, Map: Katō
- Aug 28. 1990, Hardcover (21 cm), 84 page (book1), 108 page (book 2), ISBN 4-10-353402-8
  - Box set book 1: Greece - In the Holy Mountain (ギリシャ編 アトス―神様のリアル・ワールド)
  - Box set book 2: Turkey - On the Turkish road (トルコ編 チャイと兵隊と羊―21日間トルコ一周)

=== Popular edition ===
- Subtitle: ―ギリシャ・トルコ辺境紀行―
- Photo: Eizō Matsumura
- Jul 25. 1991, Paperback (15 cm),192 page, ISBN 4-10-100139-1

=== Revised edition ===
- Subtitle: nothing
- Photo and Caption of photo: Eizō Matsumura
- Paperback (20 cm)
