= Kyoko Matsuoka =

Japanese literary scholar (1935–2022)

Kyoko Matsuoka (March 12, 1935 – January 25, 2022; Japanese: 松岡享子, romanized: Matsuoka Kyōko) was a Japanese librarian, translator, and expert in children's literature. She is known for her own children's books, of which she wrote more than 200 in her lifetime, as well as translations of works for young readers, particularly her translation of the classic Paddington Bear series.

After working at the Enoch Pratt Free Library in Baltimore, Maryland, and the Osaka Municipal Central Library, she founded the Matsunomi Bunko, a private children's library. When Matsunomi and three other libraries joined to form the Tokyo Children's Library in 1974, she became founding director of the organization. She remained honorary chair of the library until her death in 2022.

In 2021, she was designated a Person of Cultural Merit.

== Early life and education ==
Kyoko Matsuoka was born in Kobe, in Japan's Hyogo Prefecture, in 1935. Her parents had moved from Wakayama Prefecture to Kobe, where her father worked for a steamship company.

After graduating from Hyogo Prefectural Kobe High School, she studied English and children's literature at Kobe College, graduating in 1957. She then attended Keio University in Tokyo, where working at the campus library led her to decide on a career as a children's librarian. After graduating in 1960, she traveled to study in the United States, completing a master's degree at Western Michigan University three years later.

== Career ==
After finishing her graduate studies, Matsuoka stayed in the United States for a brief period, working at the Enoch Pratt Free Library, the public library system in Baltimore, Maryland. She then returned to Japan in late 1963 and worked part-time for Fukuinkan Shoten before working in children's services at the Osaka Municipal Library for two years.

During this period, Matsuoka began cultivating relationships with other women interested in promoting children's literature in Japan, including Momoko Ishii, Teiji Seta, and Shigeko Tsuchiya. She opened Matsunomi Bunko, a privately run library (bunko) for children, in Tokyo. Then, in 1974, she collaborated with Ishii and others to found the Tokyo Children's Library, serving as the organization's founding director.

Matsuoka wrote more than 200 children's books, including Ofuro Daisuki ("I Love to Take a Bath") and Kushami Kushami Ten no Megumi ("Achoo! Bless You!"), which won a Sankei Children's Book Award in 1969. She also translated many children's books from English and is perhaps best known as the Japanese translator of the Paddington Bear series, beginning with The Adventures of Paddington in 1967. Other notable translations include The Rabbits' Wedding and Beverly Cleary's Henry Huggins series.

She also taught children's literature at Toyo Eiwa University and served on the editorial board of UNESCO's Asian Cultural Centre, helping to promote children's literature throughout Asia.

Throughout her career, Matsuoka helped popularize children's books and libraries for children across Japan. For this work, she was honored as a Person of Cultural Merit in 2021. She died the following year, in January 2022, at age 86.
