= Shinchosha =

Japanese publishing company

Shinchosha Publishing Co, Ltd.

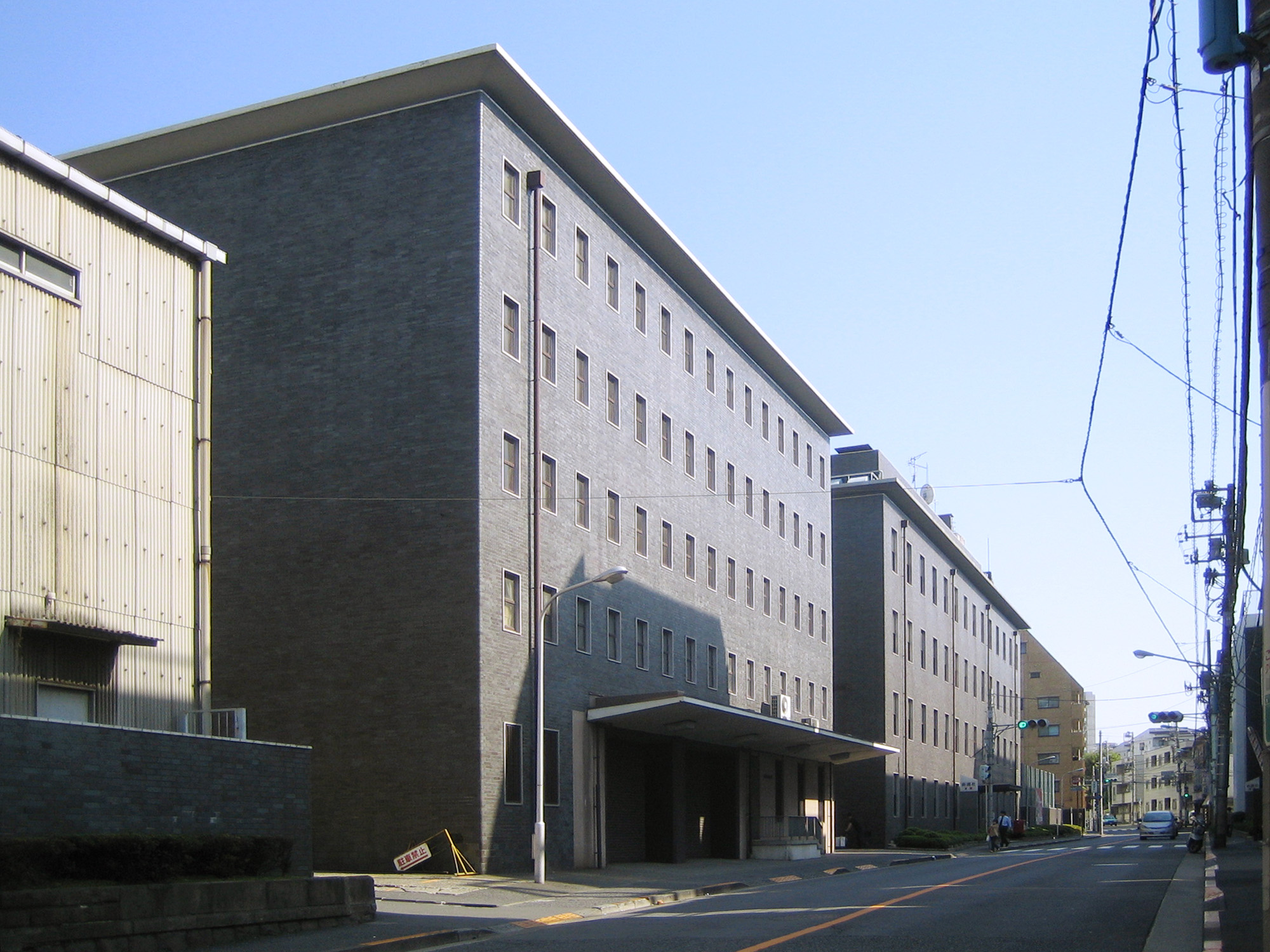
- Headquarters in Shinjuku, Tokyo
- Native name: 株式会社新潮社
- Romanized name: Kabushiki-gaisha Shinchōsha
- Type: Private KK
- Industry: Publishing
- Founded: 1896
- Founder: Yoshisuke Sato
- Headquarters: Yaraichō, Shinjuku, Tokyo, Japan
- Key people: Takanobu Sato (president and CEO)
- Products: Books; magazines
- Number of employees: 358
- Website: www.shinchosha.co.jp

Shinchosha Publishing Co, Ltd. (株式会社新潮社, Kabushiki-gaisha Shinchōsha) is a publisher founded in 1896 in Japan and headquartered in Yaraichō, Shinjuku, Tokyo. Shinchosha is one of the sponsors of the Japan Fantasy Novel Award, a yearly award begun in 1989.

== Books ==
- Haruki Murakami: Hard-Boiled Wonderland and the End of the World (1985), Uten Enten (1990), The Wind-Up Bird Chronicle (1997), After the quake (2000), 1Q84 (2009–2010), The City and Its Uncertain Walls (2023)
- Alex Kerr: Lost Japan (1993)

== Book series ==
- Aijō no unmei
- Anderusen dōwashū
- Baruzakku senshū (1947)
- Bashō: Sono kanshō to hihyō
- Camus zensyū (1972)
- Chijō (1919)
- Daihyōteki meisaku senshū (1914)
- Daini no sei
- Gendai furansu bungaku jūsanninshū
- Gendai sekai bungaku zenshū (1955)
- Goya
- Hagiwara Sakutarō zenshū
- Henrī mirā zenshū
- Heruman Hesse zenshū (1957) / Hesse zensyū
- Hito to shizen shirīzu
- Hito to shizen sōsho
- Ichijikan bunko (1953)
- Jidai shōsetsu dai zenshū
- Junkyō to hankō
- Kafuka zenshū (1953) / Kafka zensyū
- Kaigai bungaku shinsen
- Kaigai bungaku shinsen: Furansu bungaku
- Kaigai bungaku shinsen: Supein bungaku
- Katsu kaishū (1943)
- Kawamori Yoshizō watakushi no zuisōsen
- Kindai Meicho Bunko (近代名著文庫) (English, "Modern Masterpiece Library") (1917)
- Kinjiki
- Kōfuku no nochi ni kuru mono
- Meiji taishō shishi
- Nanpō kikō
- Nihon bunka
- Nihon bunka no dentō to hensen
- Niichie zenshū (1917)
- Ningen no unmei (1962)
- Norman Mailer zenshū
- Paris tabi no zatugaku nōto
- Pūshikin shōsetsu zenshū
- Roka zenshū
- Rōmajin no monogatari (1994)
- Saiensu sukuranburu
- Sekai bungaku zenshū (世界文学全集) (English, "World Literature Series") (1927)
- Sekai no ehon chugataban
- Senmannin no seiten shirīzu
- Shabake
- Shakai mondai kōza
- Sheikusupia zenshū (1949) / Shakespeare zenshū
- Shincho Art Library Series
- Shinchō bunko (新潮文庫)
- Shinchō bunko nekkusu
- Shinchō sensho
- Shinchō shinsho
- Shōnen bunka sōsho (1941)
- Shūdōin shishū
- Soveto tanpen zenshū
- Tōdai kōgi ningen no genzai
- Tonbo Books
- Tōzai bijutsuron
- Ushinawareta toki o motomete (1953)
- Yagyū bugeichō
- Yamamoto yūzō zenshū
- Yasei eno tabi
- Yozefu to sono kyōdaitachi

== Magazines ==
=== Weekly ===
- Weekly Shinchō (週刊新潮) – since 1956
- Weekly Comic Bunch (週刊コミックバンチ) – manga, discontinued in 2010
- Focus – suspended

=== Monthly ===
- Shinchō (新潮) – Literary magazine since 1904
- "Monthly" Series (「月刊」シリーズ)
- Nami (波)
- nicola
- Shinchō 45 (新潮45) (suspended)
- Geijutsu Shinchō (芸術新潮)
- Shōsetsu Shinchō (小説新潮)
- Tabi (旅)
- ENGINE – Automobile magazine, since 2000
- Foresight – Japanese edition discontinued in 2010
- Monthly Comic Bunch (月刊コミックバンチ) - manga, since 2011

=== Web magazine ===
- Foresight – Japanese edition since 2010
- Daily Shinchō – comprehensive news site basically excerpting from Shukan Shincho since 2015

=== Seasonal ===
- Kangaeru Hito (考える人)

== Grave of the Fireflies ==
In 1967, Shinchosha published a short story Grave of the Fireflies by Akiyuki Nosaka. 21 years later, Grave of the Fireflies was turned into a film by director Isao Takahata, animated by Studio Ghibli and co-distributed by Bandai Visual under their Emotion label and Toho. In turn, Shinchosha produced that film as Shinchosha 1988. The film was released in Japanese theaters on April 16, 1988. It was then licensed and released in North America as a subtitled VHS by Central Park Media on June 2, 1993, and later a 2-disc DVD by the same company in the same region, with the 1st disc featuring an English dub produced by Skypilot Entertainment and the original Japanese with English subtitles. The 2nd disc contained a retrospective on the author of the original book, an interview with the director, and an interview with critic Roger Ebert, who had expressed his admiration for the film on several occasions and ranked the film as one of the greatest of all time. Following the April 27, 2009, bankruptcy and liquidation of Central Park Media, ADV Films acquired the North American rights and re-released it on DVD on July 7, 2009, followed by former CPM titles such as MD Geist, Now and Then, Here and There and The World of Narue. Following the September 1, 2009, shutdown and rebranding of ADV Films, their successor, Sentai Filmworks, rescued the film and re-released it as a remastered DVD on March 6, 2012, and plan on releasing the film on digital outlets. A Blu-ray edition was released on November 20, 2012, featuring an all-new English dub produced by Seraphim Digital. StudioCanal released a Blu-ray in the United Kingdom on July 1, 2013, followed by a Kiki's Delivery Service release on that same format. with Madman Entertainment releasing the film in Australia and New Zealand.

Grave of the Fireflies is the first Studio Ghibli film that Disney never had distribution rights to in North America, since the film was not produced by then-parent company Tokuma Shoten (Disney formerly handled the North American distribution of all Tokuma Shoten-produced Studio Ghibli films before GKids picked up the distribution rights.) but by Shinchosha, the publisher of the original short story (as mentioned; although Disney has the Asian (including Japanese, China and Taiwan) distribution rights themselves).

== Shincho 45 suspension ==
In 2016, after an editorial change, the monthly magazine Shincho 45 increased its publication of polemical articles from authors who usually wrote for publications offering a right-wing perspective. In 2018 Shinchosha suspended publication of Shincho 45 after several articles critical of LGBT members of society appeared in the magazine, including an article by Mio Sugita in the August 2018 issue calling LGBT couples "unproductive." Shinchosha president Takanobu Sato particularly criticized a series of essays in the October 2018 issue that defended Sugita's article, calling the series "expressions full of prejudice that lacked appropriate recognition and deviated from common sense."
