= Iya Valley =

Valley in Japan

Coordinates: 33°52′31″N 133°50′07″E

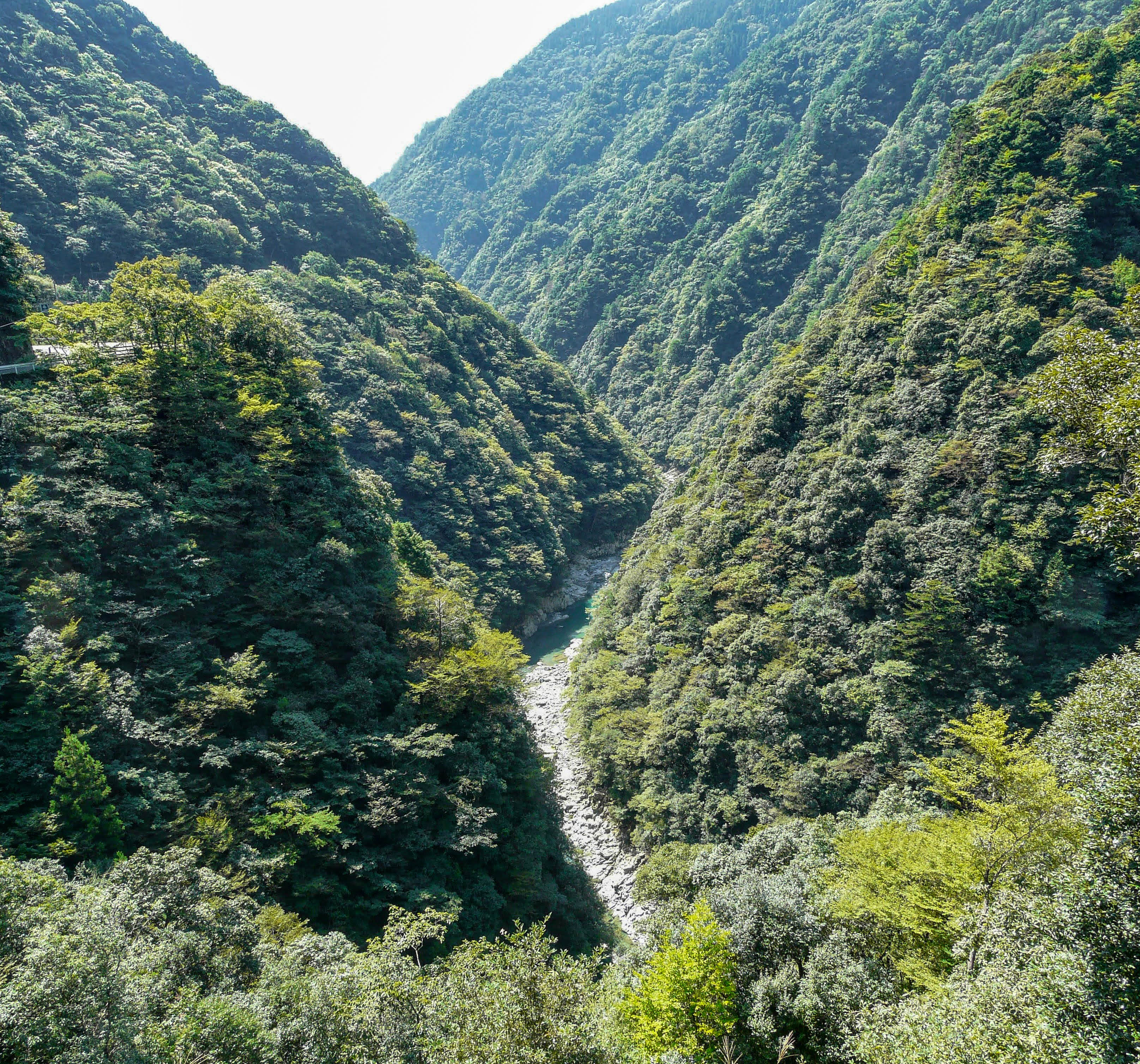
Iya Valley

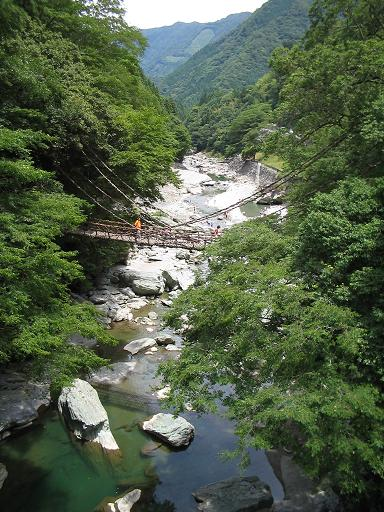
A vine bridge in West Iya.

The Iya Valley (祖谷 Iya) region in Tokushima Prefecture, Japan is a scenic area known for its mountain valleys, thatched roof farmhouses and historic Vine Bridges. Although access has improved in recent years, the Iya Valley and the inner parts of Shikoku have historically been remote and difficult to enter. Members of the Taira clan (aka Heike clan) were said to have entered the area after losing the Genpei War to the Minamoto clan in the late 12th century.

The Iya Valley has become an increasingly popular tourist destination for its natural environment and as one of the last few vestiges of old Japan. While the western part of the valley (Nishi-Iya) has good road access and tourist accommodations, the eastern part (Higashi-Iya (東祖谷) or Oku-Iya (奥祖谷)) has lesser access routes. Several Vine Bridges continue to span the valley and have become a tourist attraction.

== Etymology ==
The origin of the name Iya is unclear. According to noted Japanese historical researcher Kunio Yanagita, the term "Iya" (イヤ) or "Oya" (オヤ) has been used since time immemorial to denote this mountainous valley region. This term may translate to "ancestor" or "mountain/land spirit" (in Japanese tradition, one's ancestral spirits dwell in mountains). Still, since it is a phonetic term and predates the introduction of Chinese characters, it remains uncertain.

According to Kunio Yanagita, the introduction of Chinese characters, the Kanji characters 祖谷 ("Iya"), which translates to "ancestor valley" were chosen since they matched both the meaning and the phonetics.

== History ==
The remoteness of the Iya Valley made it a famous hideout for defeated samurai warriors and other refugees over the centuries. The most infamous inhabitants of the area were members of the Taira clan who were believed to have sought refuge in the valley after facing defeat in the Genpei War (1180-1185) to the Minamoto clan, who went on to found the Kamakura Shogunate in the late 12th century. Iya has a number of vine bridges, which are said to have been initially created by the Taira and can be found in parts of the valley.

== Geography ==
Several rivers flow through the Iya Valley region, but the Iya River (祖谷川 Iya-gawa) is the primary one. It flows from East to West, through the entirety of the Iya Valley. Mount Tsurugi (剣山 Tsurugi-san), the second-highest peak on the island of Shikoku, is at the Eastern most part of the Iya Valley along the border with Tsurugi town. The Iya River headwaters begin flowing from the springs of the mountain, some at altitudes as high as 1800m. The Iya Valley follows the river for about 50 km to the village of Iyaguchi (祖谷口) in the Yamashiro District of Miyoshi City where it joins the Yoshino River at an elevation of about 90m.

The Iya Valley was formerly divided into two designated villages, East Iya (東祖谷山村) and West Iya (西祖谷山村). On March 1, 2006, both villages merged with other local towns to form Miyoshi City. Locally, the two former villages are still referred to by their old names, "Nishi-Iya" (West Iya) and "Higashi-Iya" (East Iya).

The lower reaches of the Iya Valley are referred to as the Iya Gorge (祖谷渓 Iya-kei). This area is mostly undeveloped and unpopulated. The original road to the Iya Valley runs through this area (Rt 32) and was built between the years 1902 and 1920. Though a modern tunnel now connects the central valley to Oboke (allowing faster and easier access to the main areas of the Iya Valley), it is still possible to take the old route, mostly a one-lane road through the gorge (called the "Iya Highway"). About halfway along this 20 km long cliffside road is the Peeing Boy Statue erected in honor of young boys who relieved themselves from this high precipice.

== Culture ==
=== Food ===
Agriculture

The traditional culinary offerings in the valley are based on small terraced farm plots that climb the hillsides through the valley's hamlets. Few mechanized tools are used though some have small hand-pushed tilling machines. The main fertilizer is the susuki grass (also called kaya) which is also used as roof thatch. This grass is harvested in the mid-autumn and bundled into small pyramids around the fields to be used in the spring.

Grains and Vegetables

Various vegetables are produced for local consumption or use in the valley's inns. Historically, rice was grown but proved difficult to cultivate in abundance. The main staples are soba (buckwheat) and potatoes. The soba is either prepared as a whole-grain porridge (soba-gome) or as noodles. To this day, noodles are ground by hand in traditional stone mortars in some households, and several people in the valley offer classes.

The famed Iya potatoes are small and dense due to the rough and rocky soil conditions. Usually served roasted or in soups, a local dish consists of whole-boiled potatoes mixed with miso paste and garlic.

Other foods include locally produced tofu -which is rather unusual in Japan- and is called ishi-tofu or iwa-dofu by the locals which literally means "stone tofu". It gets its name from its thick density. It is so stiff that a brick-sized piece would be traditionally carried by a single rope wrapped around it. This is prepared in soups, roasted over charcoal with miso paste, or served uncooked with ground ginger, green onions, and soy sauce.

Konnyaku is another locally produced delicacy which is a rubbery gelatin produced from a Japanese yam. Renowned for its medicinal and health qualities, it is served in soups, roasted or uncooked with miso paste.

A common treat in this region called dekomawashi consists of a whole Iya potato, a square of iwadofu and a wedge of konnyaku all skewered together on a bamboo stick, then slathered with miso and slowly roasted over coals. This can be found at roadside shops and most hotels and restaurants.

Various types of wild mountain sprouts collectively known throughout Japan as san-sai (mountain vegetables) are a garnish for soups and noodle dishes and are a sought-after delicacy in the Iya Valley. As such, mountainous terrain is where they tend to grow randomly. However, as elsewhere in the country, due to the expense and difficulty in producing them, it is more common at most local restaurants and hotels to be served cheaper imported san-sai, usually from China. Local people do produce san-sai for their own use and visitors staying at a small inn or homestay may have an opportunity to sample the local variety.

==== Meat ====
In the past, hunting and fishing were common. However, wild boar and deer are still prized, and the few living hunters/trappers can now sell their finds at the new hunters' butchery, opened in 2014, located in Higashi Iya. As a result, such wild game is available in some local restaurants and hotels. Traditionally, the local hunters had huts deep in the mountains (only a dozen or so remain active) where their kills were taken and butchered, the hunting dogs were fed, the meat was grilled and shared. It was a common practice for the prime cuts to be eaten raw.

River trout (amego) is a popular delicacy, and though some still fished it, it is more commonly farmed by a few local hatcheries. The entire fish is usually encrusted in salt, skewered with a bamboo stick, and then slowly roasted over charcoal.

The amego fish is also the main ingredient of hirara-yaki, an offering unique to the Iya Valley. This meal is traditionally slow-cooked on a large stone with a fire, but now more commonly prepared on a large iron griddle. Thick walls of miso paste (both red and white miso) are formed in a circle around the edges, and inside a collection of fish, potatoes, tofu, onions, and konnyaku are cooked in a sake-based broth that steeps in the surrounding miso. While usually prepared at festivals or special occasions, it is possible to find one on the menu at some inns and hotels.

=== Drink ===
There is no local alcohol legally produced. While beer is common, the older generation prefers sake, and middle-aged men are more partial to shochu.

The Iya drinking etiquette is usually practiced at shrine festivals, home parties, and banquets. A person has his own small cup from which he must first consume a cupful to 'break it in'. Then the person passes the cup to his neighbor and pours him a cup (usually sake, but any alcohol or even non-alcohol is allowed). The neighbor must immediately drink it so he can return the cup. The cup is then poured for the person, and he must quickly drink it before returning. This sharing and serving of cups continue back and forth between two people as long as their conversation, and then they move on to other people in the room. It is proper to share at least one cup with every person present at the occasion, which takes a long time and results in heavy intoxication at large gatherings.

It is common for local people to grow and roast their own tea, called bancha (番茶), and it is primarily used for household consumption. Each spring, the youngest leaves are picked, roasted, pressed by hand, and dried in the sun on straw mats laid out in front of homes. When visiting a home, it is common to be served hot or lukewarm.

=== Festivals ===
Several festivals of various sizes are held throughout the year.

Most local Shinto shrines host their festivals for the surrounding neighborhood once or twice a year according to their own traditions. In these events, local customs often call for a group of men to carry a small (70–150 kg) portable shrine around the shrine grounds, accompanied by drummers, costumed people, and sometimes a pair of people throwing long bamboo staffs. Each shrine and neighborhood has its own customs (one or two even have their attendees engage in sumo), but due to the dwindling population, these traditions are less common.

The largest festivals in the valley are the summer festivals, one each in Nishi-Iya and Higashi-Iya. They are held at the middle school grounds on the weekends before and after the national Obon Holiday (August 15) since it is a time when family members who have moved away often return for a visit. These events are open to anyone and include food tents, games, performances, and fireworks, so if visiting the area at this time, ask around or look for promotional posters.

The Yukigassen (Snowball Fight Competition) is held each January in Higashi Iya and has become a major event at a time when few visit the valley. Not simply a free-for-all event, this event is team-based, and participants often practice for months to coordinate their skills in the tightly ruled sport. There are several classes of participation, including children, women's, men's, and 'just for fun' leagues, and the winners of the main event advance to the national competition annually held in Nagano Prefecture.

=== Architecture ===
The original Iya hamlets extend up the valley walls in clusters, and roads have only been built to connect to the main roadway at the base of the valley in the last forty years. Roads in many hamlets were built as recently as the 1990s.

The traditional home building style in the Iya valley is called kayabuki ( 茅葺 thatched roof house, also called minka 民家) and many examples of these buildings still exist, though those with exposed thatch have been re-purposed as inns, restaurants, or historic sites. Since cutting, bundling and replacing the thatch is a time-consuming and costly endeavor, most personal homes have shifted to corrugated tin panels to prevent it from rotting. Though thatch isn't visible, it is easy to spot these homes on the hillsides from their thick, high-pitched roofs. Since the 1950s, many of the thatched homes have had their roof pitch lowered or completely replaced with either tiles or corrugated tin.

Historically, it was common for a home site to consist of three buildings: the main home, the barn, and the inkyo (隠居) "retirement home", a smaller but independently functioning house for the family's oldest members. As one set of grandparents passes away, the next moves into this house.

Most modern homes from the 1960s onwards lie along the main valley roadside and are often built with heavy steel scaffolds due to a lack of flat space.

The frames of the traditional homes are made with massive, interwoven red pine (akamatsu 赤松) or southern Japanese hemlock (tsuga 栂) logs for horizontal beams and squared-off chestnut (kuri 栗) for vertical beams. All are connected through traditional craftsmanship without nails, allowing the wood to expand and contract with the seasons. Some of the oldest building examples date back to the seventeenth century. The foundations are usually made entirely of chestnut beams due to its high strength and anti-rotting properties, and the base beams simply sit upon stone piles such that nothing is actually secured to the ground (that is, no concrete or planting of beams).

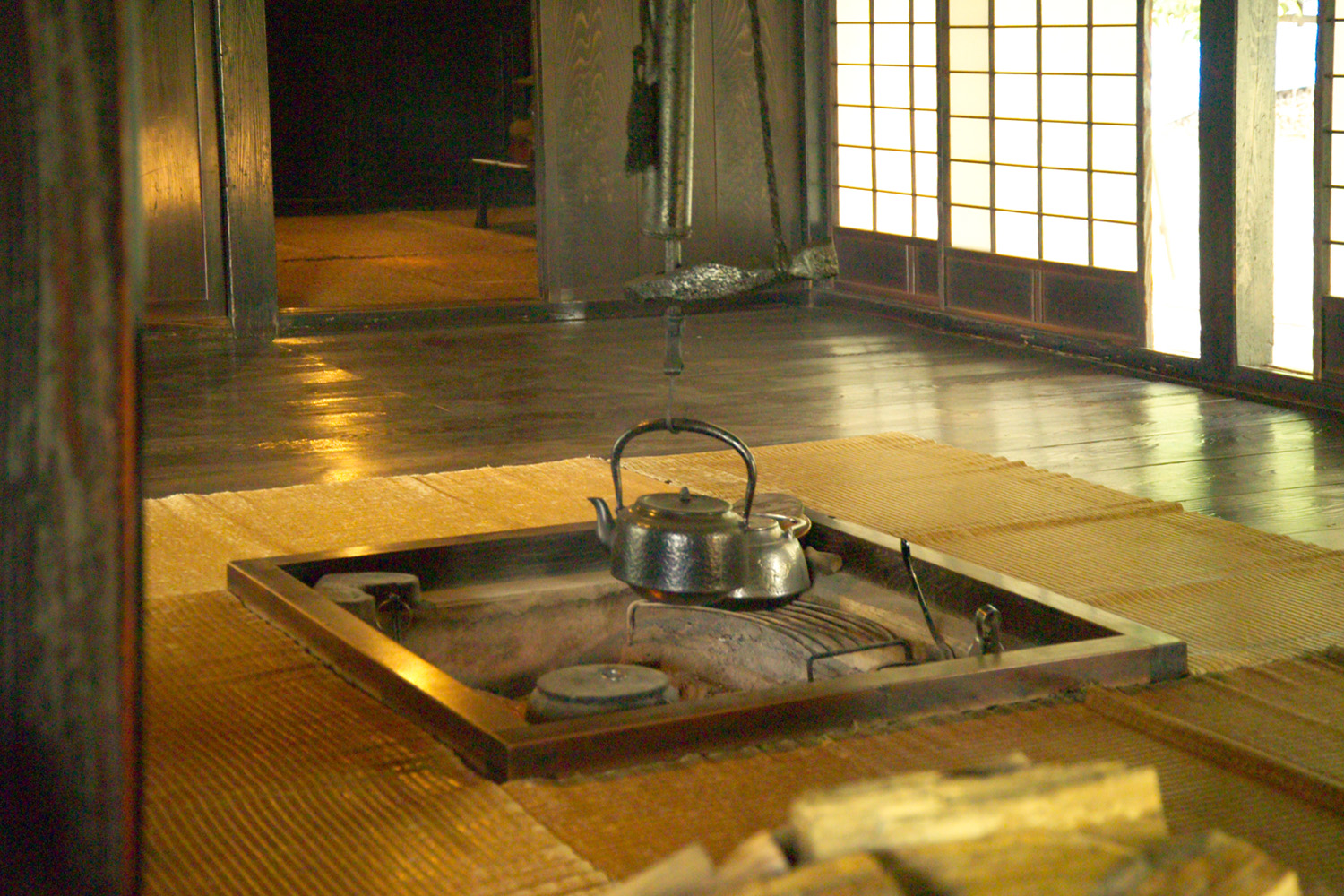
Irori

Inside, the center point of the home is the approximately one-meter square irori (囲炉裏 sunken floor hearth), which would usually stay alight with low embers at all times. To maintain the burn, four chestnut logs would be placed inward at each corner, and a small, flameless charcoal fire within the joining point at the center would slowly burn on the tips of the logs, and as the logs burned out, they would be pushed slightly more into the center. The irori would be used for cooking, either with an iron pot stand or with the suspended jizai-kagi (自在鈎) which consists of an adjustable hook connected to a ceiling beam above and from which a pot could be hung, with the height adjusted according to the temperature sought. Often the jizai-kagi would be made of a bamboo pole with a carved wooden fish used for the hook adjusting mechanism (with the fish serving as a water talisman to ward off the danger of fire).

Since fire would constantly burn, and there are no chimneys, the ceilings and beams often blackened with soot. The internal bamboo lattice to which the roof thatch would be lashed to would accordingly turn a deep red-brown when polished (called susutake 煤竹), and it was sought after by handicraft workers whenever a roof was replaced. One of the main reasons to have such a smokey atmosphere was to help dry out the roof thatch from the inside and extend its lifespan (usually about 25 or 30 years). However, the smoke-filled homes did serve an additional purpose, which was to help cure the tobacco leaves that would be hung from the rafters during the winter (until the 1970s, tobacco was the primary cash-crop in the valley. Currently it is no longer grown anywhere in Iya).

Also standard in the homes is the storage cellar, located under a removable pair of floorboards. The cellar is dug about one meter deep into the ground and is used to store potatoes, pickles and other foods in cooler temperatures.

The best known historical houses of East Iya are:

Asa-ke House 阿佐家住宅. Located in the hamlet of Asa 阿佐, this is one of the largest houses in Iya, formerly lived in by the leader of the descendants of the Heike warriors who fled into Iya in the late 12th century. The present house dates from 1862 and was fully restored in 1917.

Kita-ke House 喜多家住宅. Located in the hamlet of Oeda 大枝, this was formerly a samurai residence, like Asa-ke a very large house for Iya. It was built in Horeki 13 宝暦13, which corresponds to 1763. It was moved to its present location and fully restored in 1990.

Kimura-ke House 木村家住宅. Located in the hamlet of Tsurui 釣井, this is oldest house in Iya, dated to Genroku 12 元禄12, which corresponds to 1699. In 1976 it was declared an Important Cultural Property 重要文化財, and it was fully restored in 1984.

Chiiori 篪庵. "Sister house" to Kimura-ke, just up the hill in Tsurui hamlet. It's believed to have been built around the same time or soon after Kimura-ke in the Genroku Era 元禄時代 (1688-1704). Bought by writer Alex Kerr in 1973, it has been the center first of a volunteer movement, and since the 2000s, NPO "Chiiori Trust" and company "Chiiori Alliance" dedicated to rural revival in Iya and elsewhere in Japan. The house was fully restored in 2012.

Houses in Ochiai Hamlet 落合集落. Ochiai hamlet, perched on a steep hillside, includes numerous old houses dating from the 18th to the early 20th centuries. In 2005 the hamlet was designated by the national government as a Juyo Dentoteki Kenzobutsugun 重要伝統的建造物群, (abbreviated to Judenken 重伝建), "Important Group of Traditional Structures." From 2012 to 2016, the City of Miyoshi, to which Iya belongs, restored eight houses, re-thatching the roofs, and installing modern comforts. The planning and design were done by Alex Kerr and the Chiiori staff. The houses are now managed for the city by Chiiori Alliance as "Tougenkyo Iya" 桃源郷祖谷 ("Shangrila Iya").

== Vine Bridges ==
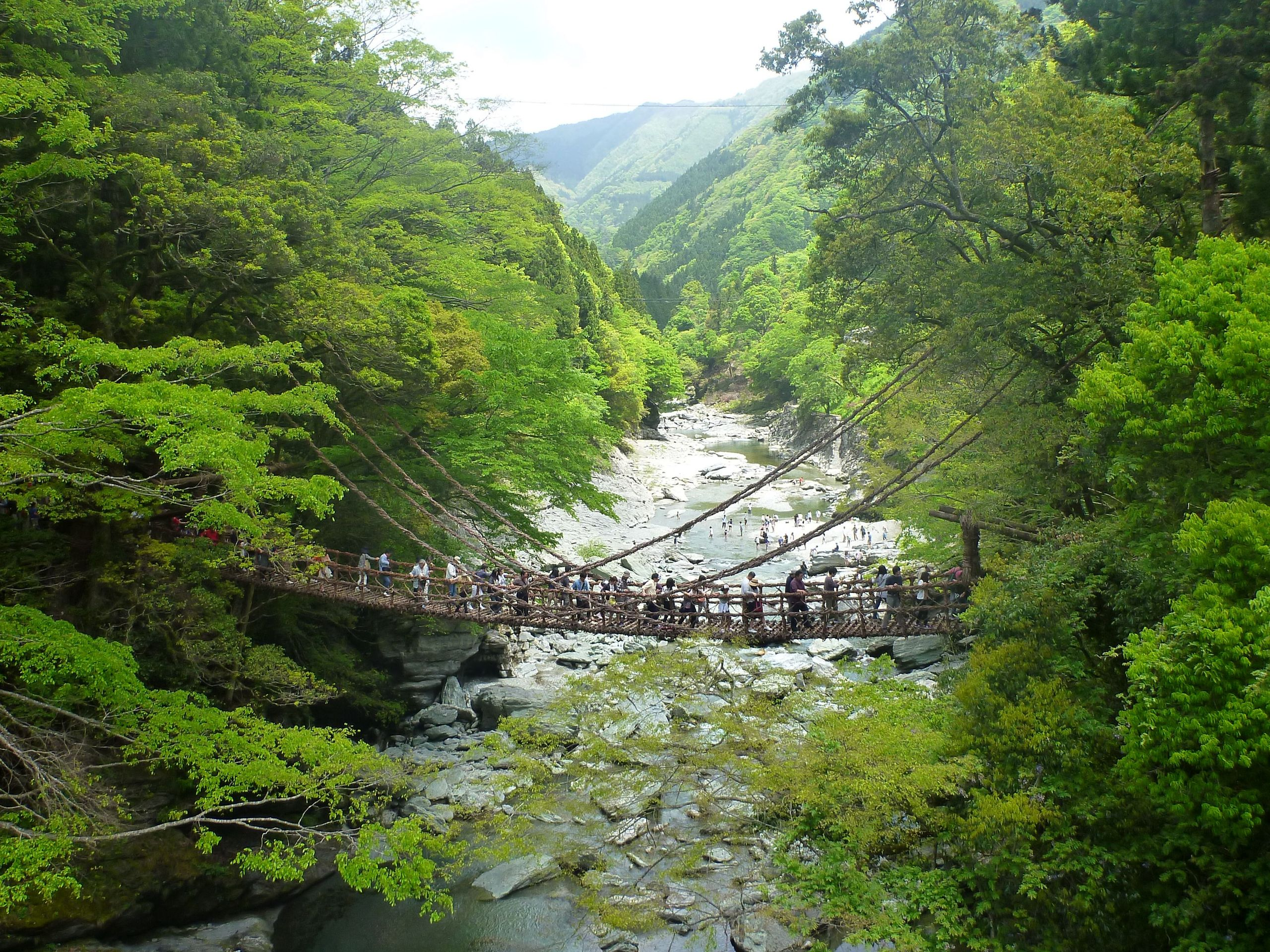
Kazurabashi||かずら橋 footbridge

The Iya Valley is known for its unique Vine Bridges (called "kazurabashi") over the Iya River, made of several tons of Actinidia argute (hardy kiwi) vines from the surrounding mountains. At one point there were 13 of them, but now only 3 remain: the main Iya-no-Kazurabashi in Nishi-Iya, and the Oku-Iya Double Vine Bridges ("Oku-Iya Niju Kazurabashi") located at the furthest end of Higashi-Iya near the base of Mt Tsurugi. The main Iya-no-Kazurabashi, 45 meters in length, is classified as an important Tangible Folk Culture Property. Its vines are replaced every 3 years and reinforced with steel cables for safety.

== Tourism ==
The western part of the valley (Nishi-Iya) is a favorable tourist spot due to its historic vine bridge (kazurabashi) and hot spring baths at the large hotels. Most tourists do not go deeper mainly due to the one lane road creating restrictions for most tour buses.

The deeper reaches of the valley in Higashi Iya are more conserved. Temperatures are moderate in summer compared to most parts of the country. Aside from the scenic double vine bridge (Oku-Iya Kazurabashi), there are historic hamlets, thatched-roof homes, extensive mountain hiking, and one of the oldest art installations in the country.

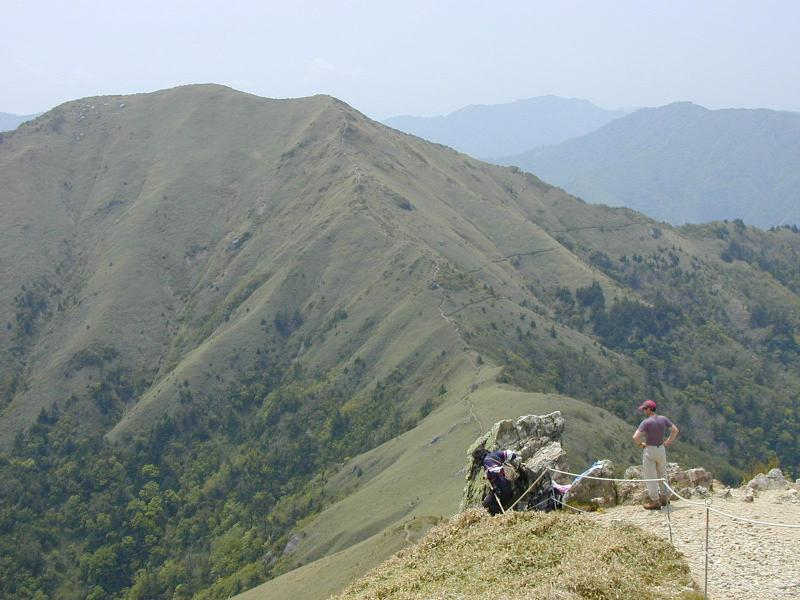
Iya Jirogyu view

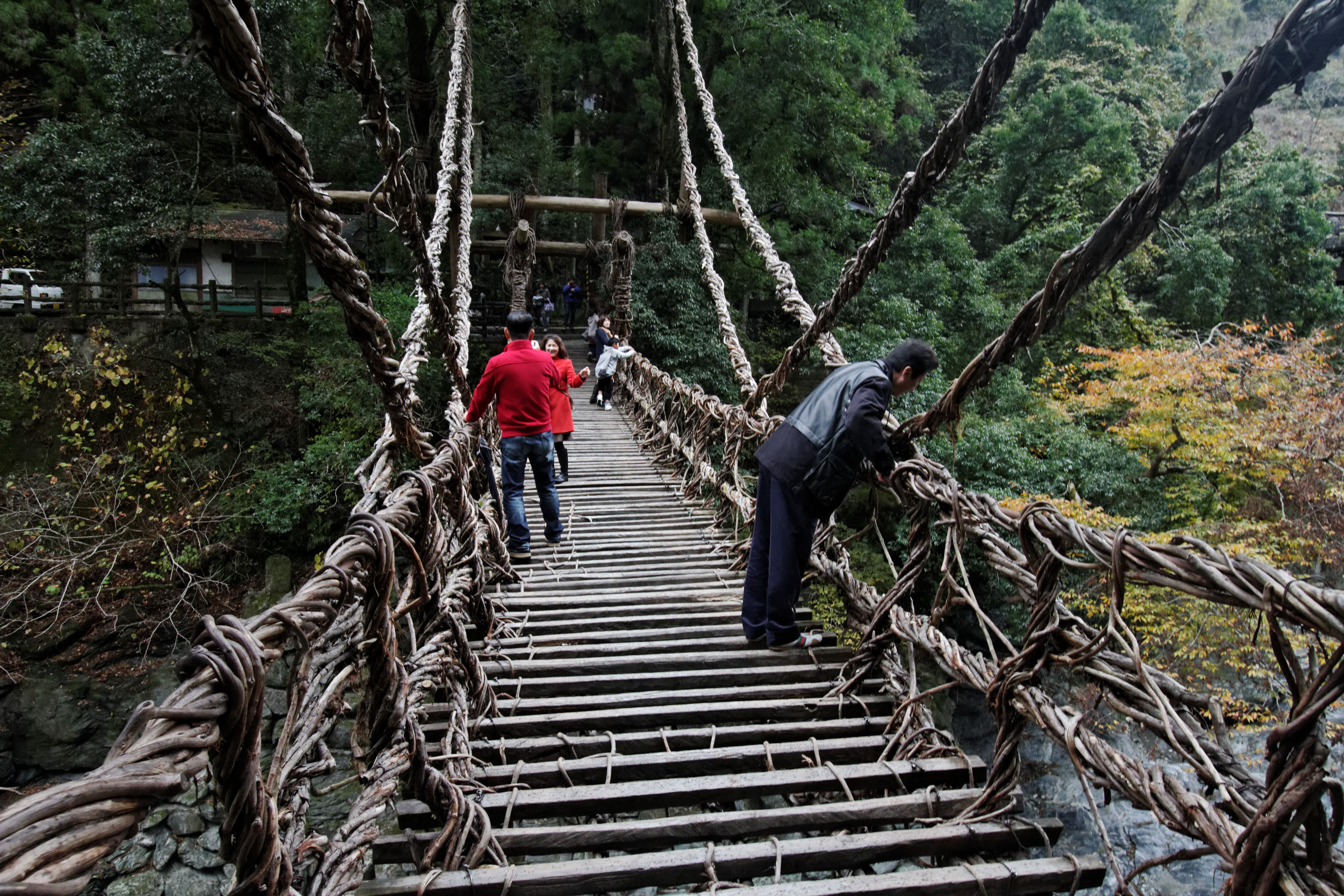
Iya vine bridge

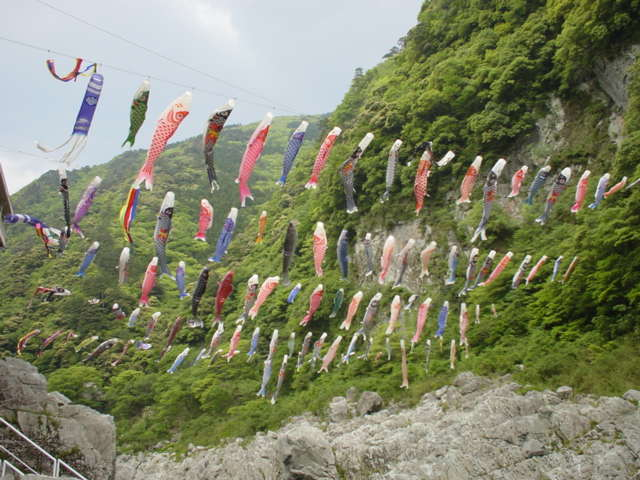
Koi banners flying over Oboke Koboke

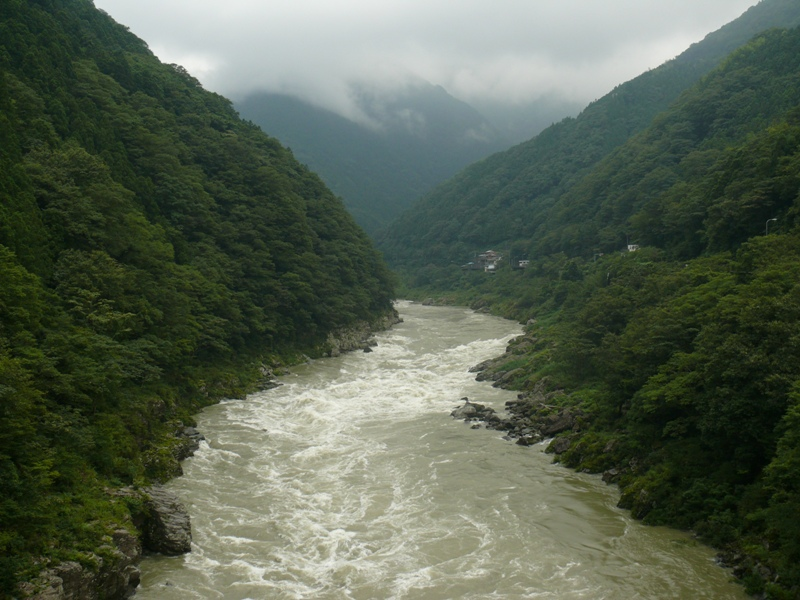
Yoshino River, in Oboke Koboke (looking west), after typhoon No. 9, 2009

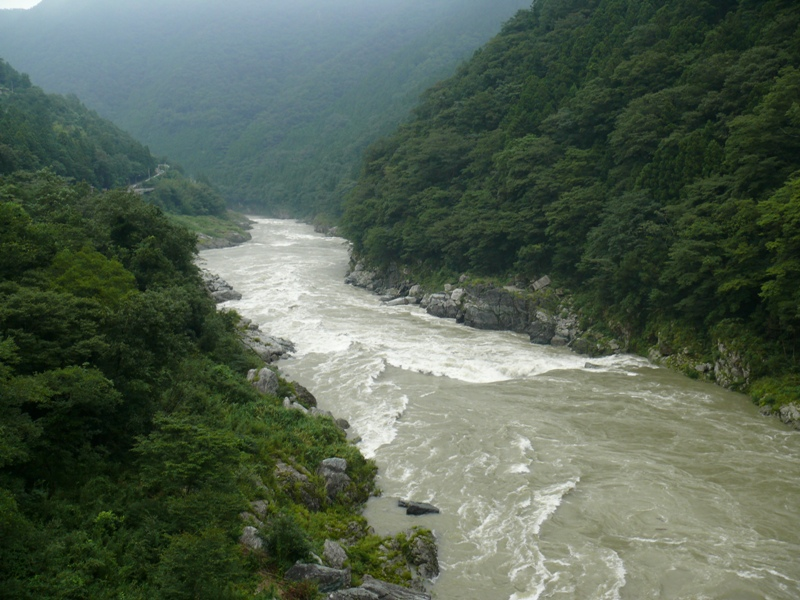
Yoshino River, in Oboke Koboke (looking east), after typhoon No.9, 2009
