= Alex Kerr (Japanologist) =

American writer and Japanologist (born 1952)

Alex Kerr (born June 16, 1952) is an American writer and Japanologist.

== Biography ==
Kerr is originally from the Bethesda area in Montgomery County, Maryland. His father, a naval officer, was posted in Yokohama from 1964 to 1966. Kerr returned to the states and studied Japanese Studies at Yale University. After studying Chinese Studies at the University of Oxford as a Rhodes Scholar, Kerr moved back to Japan full-time in 1977. He lived in Kameoka, near Kyoto, working with the Oomoto Foundation, a Shintō organisation devoted to the practise and teaching of traditional Japanese arts.

An expert on Japanese culture and art, he frequently writes and lectures in Japanese. Through his experiences in Japan, as related in his books, he has become an avid art collector and patron of Japan's traditional theatre and other arts. He also worked in business, working for Trammell Crow in the 1980s. Kerr currently has several residences. He lives in Bangkok, Thailand for half of the year, and Kyoto for the other half, visiting and staying at Chiiori as well.

== Chiiori ==
In the early 1970s, Kerr purchased a crumbling, abandoned, two-hundred-year-old Japanese house in the Iya Valley, a remote mountainous area of Tokushima prefecture on the island of Shikoku. He restored the house to a liveable state, including re-thatching the kayabuki roof using traditional materials. The house was given the name Chiiori, or "House of the Flute". The restoration of Chiiori began a project by Kerr and others to preserve Japan's vanishing arts, culture and traditional lifestyle.

In 2007, Kerr decided to become more personally involved in Iya. He expanded and reorganized the board of directors of the project, and closed the house for a few months for renovations. It reopened in November 2007.

== Works ==
In his book Lost Japan (1993), he describes what he saw as the sorry modern state of the country in which he has spent more than 35 years of his life. It was originally written and published in Japanese as Utsukushiki Nihon no Zanzō (美しき日本の残像, Last Glimpse of Beautiful Japan). He was the first foreigner to be awarded the Shincho Gakugei Literature Prize for the best work of non-fiction published in Japan in 1994 for this work. His later work Dogs and Demons (2002) addressed the same issues of degradation and loss of native culture in the wake of Modernization/Westernization. In Another Kyoto (2016), Kerr and co-author Kathy Arlyn Sokol draw on decades of living in Kyoto and reflect on the architecture of the city’s famous monuments.

== English-language works ==
- Lost Japan (1993) ISBN 0-86442-370-5
- Dogs and Demons: The Fall of Modern Japan (2002) ISBN 0-14-101000-2
- Living in Japan (2006) ISBN 3-8228-4594-9
- Bangkok Found: Reflections on the City (2010) ISBN 978-9749863923
- Another Kyoto (2016) ISBN 4418165118
- Finding the Heart Sutra: Guided by a Magician, an Art Collector and Buddhist Sages from Tibet to Japan (2020) ISBN 0241468450
- Another Bangkok: Reflections on the City (2021) ISBN 0141987189
- Hidden Japan: An Astonishing World of Thatched Villages, Ancient Shrines and Primeval Forests (2023) ISBN 9784805317518
