= Mukogawa Women's University =

Private women's university in Nishinomiya, Japan

Coordinates: 34°43′3″N 135°2′34″E

- 武庫川女子大学
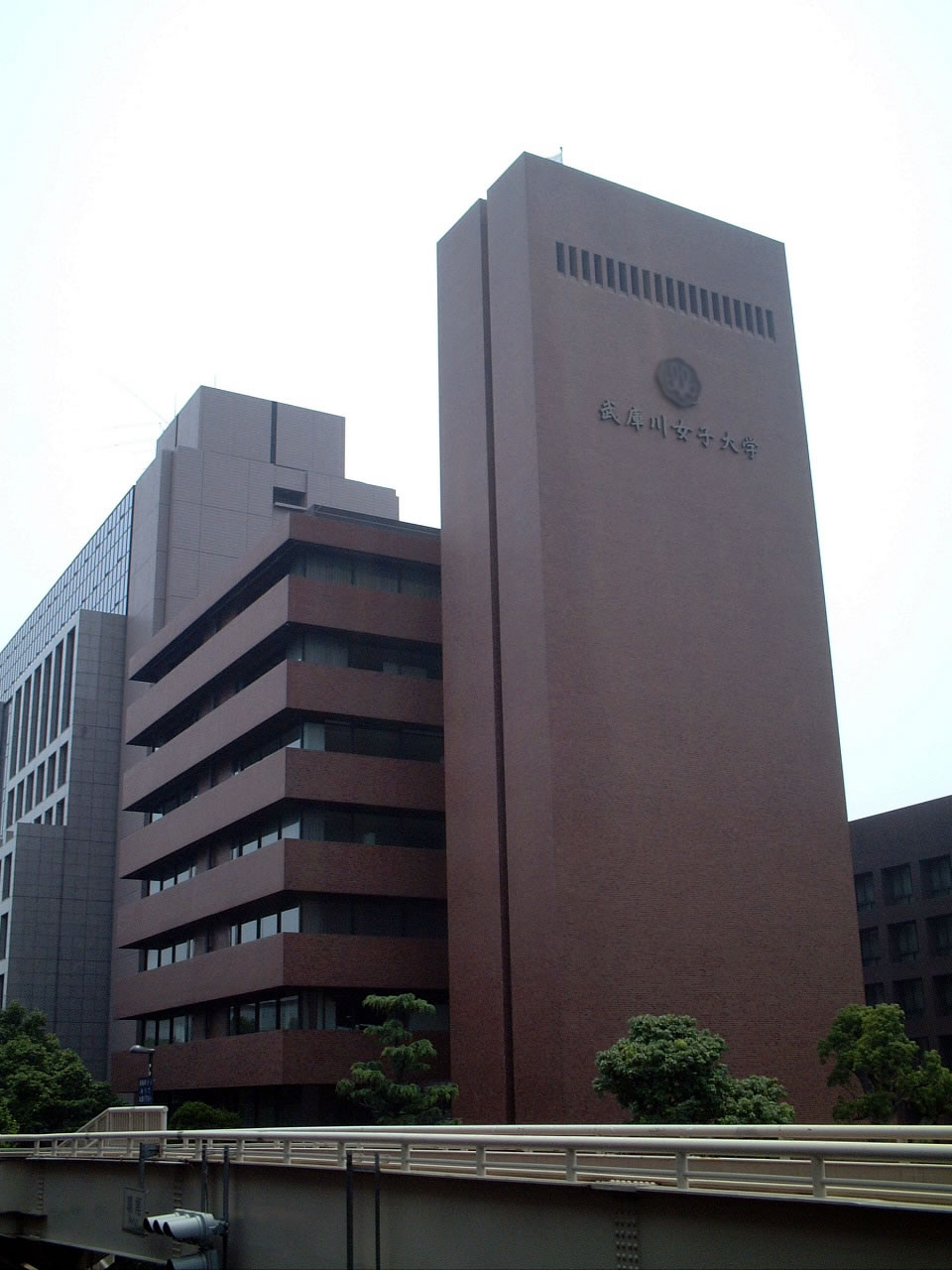
- Motto: “High intelligence, noble sentiments, lofty virtues.”
- Type: Private university
- Established: February 25, 1939
- Affiliations: Kansai Association of Universities for Adult Education
- President: Naosuke Itoigawa
- Students: 7,700
- Location: Nishinomiya, Hyogo, Japan
- Campus: Central Campus, Hama-Koshien Campus, Kami-Koshien Campus
- Colours: Red, White
- Mascot: Lavy
- Website: http://www.mukogawa-u.ac.jp

Mukogawa Women's University (武庫川女子大学, Mukogawa Joshi Daigaku) is a private university located near Koshien Stadium in Nishinomiya, Hyōgo, Japan, founded in 1939. It has an international branch campus in Spokane, Washington, United States: Mukogawa U.S. Campus.

As of 2026 it is the largest women's university in Japan. It is scheduled to change its name to Mukogawa University (武庫川大学, Mukogawa Daigaku) in April 2027 and become coeducational.

== History ==
- Feb 25, 1939 Educational Corporation Mukogawa Gakuin established by Kiichiro Koe
- Apr 1, 1939 Mukogawa Girls' High School founded
- Apr 1, 1946 Mukogawa Women's Academy founded
- Apr 1, 1947 Mukogawa Women's University junior High School founded
- Jun 12, 1947 Emperor Hirohito visits Mukogawa
- Apr 1, 1948 Mukogawa Women's University Senior High School founded
- Apr 1, 1950 Junior College Division established
- Oct 30, 1956 The Emperor and the Empress visit Mukogawa
- Apr 1, 1966 Graduate School Master's Course established
- Apr 30, 1967 Akira Kusaka appointed President of university and Junior College
- Apr 1, 1979 University Kindergarten established
- Sep 6, 1981 Founder Kiichiro Koe dies
- Sep 25, 1981 Akira Kusaka inaugurated as chairman of the board and Chancellor
- Apr 1, 1985 One-year graduate programs established
- Apr 1. 1989 Graduate School Doctor's Course established
- Jan 31, 1990 Mukogawa Fort Wright Institute established in Spokane, Washington U.S.A.
- Nov 6, 1999 Sixtieth anniversary celebrated
- Sep 1, 2001 Chairman of the Board, Chancellor and President Akira Kusaka dies
- Sep 2, 2001 Ryo Okawara inaugurated as chairman of the board and Chancellor
- Sep 2, 2001 Toshiharu Yamamoto appointed President of university and Junior College
- Apr 1, 2006 Junichi Kunitomo appointed President of university and Junior College

== Departments ==
=== School of Letters ===
- Department of Japanese Language and Literature
- Department of English
- Department of Education
- Department of Health and Sports Sciences
- Department of Psychology and Social Welfare

=== School of Human Environmental Sciences ===
- Department of Human Environmental Sciences
- Department of Food Science and Nutrition
- Department of Informatics and Mediology
- Department of Architecture

=== School of Music ===
- Department of Performing Arts, School of Music
- Department of Applied Music, School of Music

=== School of Pharmacy and Pharmaceutical Sciences ===
- Department of Pharmacy
- Department of Health and Bio-pharmaceutical Sciences

== Graduate Schools ==
- Graduate School of Human Environmental Sciences
- Graduate School of Pharmaceutical Sciences
- Graduate School of Clinical Education

== Affiliated Schools ==
- Mukogawa Women's University Junior & Senior High School
