= Blind Willow, Sleeping Woman =

2006 short story collection by Haruki Murakami

- UK 1st edition cover
- Editor: Haruki Murakami
- Author: Haruki Murakami
- Original title: めくらやなぎと眠る女; Mekurayanagi to nemuru onna
- Translator: Philip Gabriel, Jay Rubin
- Language: Japanese
- Genre: Short story collection
- Published: 2006 (Harvill Secker) (UK); 2006 (Knopf) (U.S.)
- Publication place: Japan
- Media type: Print (hardback & paperback)
- Pages: 334 (UK); 352 (U.S.)
- ISBN: 1-84343-269-2 (UK); 1-4000-4461-8 (U.S.)
- OCLC: 65203792

Blind Willow, Sleeping Woman (めくらやなぎと眠る女, Mekurayanagi to nemuru onna) is a collection of 24 short stories by Japanese author Haruki Murakami.

The stories contained in the book were written between 1980 and 2005, and published in Japan in various magazines and collections. The contents of this compilation was selected by Murakami and first published in English translation in 2006 (its Japanese counterpart was released later in 2009). Around half the stories were translated by Philip Gabriel with the other half being translated by Jay Rubin. In this collection, the stories alternate between the two translators for the most part.

Murakami considers this to be his first real English-language collection of short stories since The Elephant Vanishes (1993) and considers after the quake (2000) to be more akin to a concept album, as its stories were designed to produce a cumulative effect.

In the introductory notes to the English-language edition of Blind Willow, Sleeping Woman, Murakami declares, "I find writing novels a challenge, writing stories a joy. If writing novels is like planting a forest, then writing short stories is more like planting a garden."

Blind Willow, Sleeping Woman (Saules aveugles, femme endormie), an animated film adaptation of the book by French animator Pierre Földes, premiered at the Annecy International Animation Film Festival in 2022.

== Contents ==
Many of the stories in the collection have been published previously in Japanese periodicals (not listed here), then translated in literary magazines (mentioned below), although some have been revised for Blind Willow. The stories are listed below in the order in which they appear in the book. Many of the stories are translated by Philip Gabriel and Jay Rubin.

Title	Previously published in English in	Year written (published)
"Blind Willow, Sleeping Woman"	Harper's	[1983] 1995
"Birthday Girl"	Harper's and Birthday Stories	2002
"New York Mining Disaster"		1980 / 1981
"Airplane: Or, How He Talked to Himself as If Reciting Poetry"	The New Yorker	[1987] 1989
"The Mirror"		1981 / 1982, (1983)
"A Folklore for My Generation: A Prehistory of Late-Stage Capitalism"	The New Yorker	1989
"Hunting Knife"	The New Yorker	1984
"A Perfect Day for Kangaroos"		1981
"Dabchick"	McSweeney's	1981
"Man-Eating Cats"	The New Yorker	1991
"A 'Poor Aunt' Story"	The New Yorker	1980
"Nausea 1979"		1984
"The Seventh Man"	Granta	1996
"The Year of Spaghetti"	The New Yorker	1981
"Tony Takitani"	The New Yorker	1990
"The Rise and Fall of Sharpie Cakes"		1981 / 1982, (1983)
"The Ice Man"	The New Yorker	1991
"Crabs"	Stories #50	1984, 2003
"Firefly"	(later reused within Norwegian Wood)	1983
"Chance Traveller"	Harper's	2005
"Hanalei Bay"		2005
"Where I'm Likely to Find It"	The New Yorker	2005
"The Kidney-Shaped Stone That Moves Every Day"		2005
"A Shinagawa Monkey"	The New Yorker	2005

- The story "Tony Takitani" (トニー滝谷) was adapted into the homonymous Tony Takitani, a 2004 Japanese film directed by Jun Ichikawa.
- The final five stories all appeared in the collection Tōkyō kitanshū (Strange Tales from Tokyo), published in Japan in 2005.
- The story "The 1963/1982 Girl from Ipanema" (translated in Jay Rubin's 2002 Haruki Murakami and the Music of Words) was originally to be added as a bonus 25th story (hence its mention by advance-copy reviewers such as Kirkus Reviews or Los Angeles Times) but the collection was eventually left with the 24 stories Murakami intended.
- The story "Blind Willow, Sleeping Woman" became the basis of "The Diary of Sounds", a 2012 Ukrainian short film directed by Glib Luukianets.
- Multiple stories from the collection are being animated for a feature-length film written and directed by Pierre Földes. Set to be released in 2022, the film is in production in France and is being produced by Cinéma De facto and Miyu Productions.

== Synopsis ==
=== "Blind Willow, Sleeping Woman" ===
An unnamed adult narrator and his younger teen-aged cousin wait for a bus to take them to the hospital so the cousin can have his ear problem examined, an ailment he has had since he was young due to being hit in the ear by a baseball. While waiting, the cousin inquires deeply about the narrator's watch. The bus ride takes them through much hilly terrain and gives the narrator time to think about how he developed a close bond with his cousin. After the cousin checks in, the narrator reminisces on what happened the last time he visited a nearby hospital.

While the narrator was in high school, he and his friend visited his friend's girlfriend at the hospital, who needed to have one of her ribs realigned. After the operation, the girlfriend tells a narrative-poem about a woman who sleeps indefinitely because a "blind willow" sends its flies to carry pollen to her ear, burrow inside, and put her to sleep. Eventually, these flies eat the woman's flesh starting from the inside, despite a young man's effort in trying to save her.

After the cousin returns from the check-up, the two cousins lunch. When they talk about the cousin's ailment and how it will probably affect him for the rest of his life, he says he thinks of the movie line "Don't worry. If you were able to spot some Indians, that means there aren't any there" from Fort Apache whenever someone sympathizes with him about his ears. As the bus taking them home approaches, the narrator begins to daydream of how he and his friend were careless with a gift of chocolates for the girlfriend many years ago. When he is able to think clearly again, he tells his cousin, "I'm all right."

=== "Birthday Girl" ===
A woman who turns twenty receives the chance to make a wish.

=== "New York Mining Disaster" ===
A twenty-eight-year-old man has to go to five of his friends' funerals in one year. Because he does not own a black suit, he always borrows his friend's suit; this friend has a peculiar habit of going to zoo at odd times, include when natural disasters like typhoons are coming and only has a girlfriend for about six months before finding a new companion. At the end of the year, the man returns the suit to his friend and they talk about superstitions and T.V.s over beer and champagne.

At a New Year's Eve party at a bar in Roppongi, the man is introduced to a mysterious woman who claims she "killed" someone that looks like the man five years ago. They discuss this "killing" before they go their own way. In the final section, a press release-style passage tells of miners trapped underground as the outside world tries to save them.

=== "Airplane: Or, How He Talked to Himself as If Reciting Poetry" ===
A twenty-year-old man meets regularly with a married woman seven years his senior at her place regularly to have sex; her husband is often out-of-town for his job and her daughter is in kindergarten. She has an idiosyncratic habit of crying for a set amount of time every so often and he has a peculiar practice of reciting "poetry" under his breath and not remembering any of it.

One day she decides to write down what he says and they learn it is about airplanes. They try to make meaning of it but they conclude that he must mention airplanes for some ineffable reason. That day, she also cries twice, the only time this happens in all the time the two are acquainted.

=== "The Mirror" ===
A man tells the story of how he worked as a night watchman at a school in a small town in Niigata Prefecture shortly after graduating from high school. His job was simple: patrol the premise at nine P.M. and three A.M. During a windy night in October, while he is patrolling the campus, he sees himself in a mirror by the entrance. At first, he is surprised but after a few minutes he becomes horrified: the person in the mirror is not him. In a panic, he drops his cigarette, smashes the mirror, and rushes back to his quarters. In the morning he learns that there are no signs of a mirror from the previous night. Because of this incident, the man states that he does not have any mirrors in his house.

=== "A Folklore for My Generation: A Prehistory of Late-Stage Capitalism" ===
A narrator meets an old classmate from his high school days in Kobe during his trip to Lucca. In a frame story, the classmate tells about his relationship with his girlfriend Yoshiko; most people thought they were ideal because of excellence in so many things but it was, in fact, the opposite. While they much enjoyed each other's company, they never had intercourse as Yoshiko wanted to keep her virginity until after marriage, the most sensual thing they do being erotic touching with their clothes on. They go to different universities after graduation (she remains in Kobe attending a women's college and he goes to Tokyo University), but they remain in a relationship for four years. The last time the classmate decides to bring up sex is right before they drift apart and eventually break up; Yoshiko is adamant but tells him that she will sleep with him after she is married.

When they are both in their late twenties, Yoshiko calls him after she is married, asking him to come over to her apartment while her husband is away; she is willing to keep her promise. The classmate feels that it would not be the same so the extent of their tryst remains erotic touching. When the classmate leaves her apartment that day, he knows he will never see her again; he sleeps with a prostitute that evening before continuing on with the rest of his life.

=== "Hunting Knife" ===
A couple in their late twenties are vacationing on a Pacific Island, most likely Guam or Hawaii; they share a cottage with an elderly American mother and her adult, wheelchair-using son. On the afternoon of the day before they are set to return to Tokyo, while his wife is taking a nap, the narrator goes for a swim in the ocean. He eventually finds himself on a raft with an obese but healthy American woman and they talk. They talk about their respective personal lives before the narrator returns to the hotel to spend the evening with his wife. The narrator wakes up past midnight and is unable to continue sleeping so he goes out for a walk; he runs into the son at the beach bar and converses with him. The son talks about how he and his mother are staying there indefinitely and his philosophy regarding their relative idleness when they stay at these types of resorts. He finally shows an ornate hunting knife to the narrator and asks him to cut something for him. After hacking away at a number of things, the son tells about a recurring dream he has: there is a "knife" stuck in his head but he is unable to pull it out no matter how hard he tries.

=== "A Perfect Day for Kangaroos" ===
A man and a woman go to see a kangaroo family at the zoo a month after seeing it advertised in the newspaper. When they arrive, they notice that there is no longer a baby kangaroo and are disappointed. The man goes to buy the woman ice cream and when he returns, the woman points out that there is a baby in the mother's pouch. After they realize that the baby is asleep, they agree to grab a beer somewhere together.

=== "Dabchick" ===
A man running down an underground corridor to get to a job interview has to decide whether to go right or left at a T-shaped intersection; he flips a coin and decide to go right. A secretary for the "boss" emerges from a bath and tells the man he has to give a password to meet the "boss." He asks for clues and concludes that it must be "dabchick" and is adamant; when the secretary tells him it is not the correct password, he insists that the secretary tell the "boss" anyway. When the secretary tells the "boss" over the intercom, it is revealed that the "boss" is a palm-sized dabchick and he comments to the secretary that the man is late.

=== "Man-Eating Cats" ===
A married man with a son meets a woman named Izumi during a business meeting; they soon realize that they have an ineffable mutual bond. They eventually consummate their relationship, but when Izumi's husband and the man's wife find out, the cheated spouses leave their respective partners (the man's wife also takes custody of their son). Izumi suggests to the man that they quit their jobs and go live on a Greek island for a few years with their savings; he agrees. On the airplane flight to the island, he has an anxiety attack, scared of a new start in a faraway land.

One day during their stay in Greece, the man reads a story in the newspaper to Izumi about a local woman who was eaten by her cats after she died (thus leaving her famished pets trapped in her apartment). Izumi says that it reminds her of a story a nun told her when she attended Catholic school: the nun says if you are stranded on an island with a cat, do not share food with the cat as it is not "chosen by God." He then tells the story of how, during his childhood, a cat "disappeared" by running up a tree. That night, he wakes up and finds Izumi missing; he also hears music coming from the top on a nearby hill and decides to make the trek to the summit to find the source of the melody. On the way up the hill, he experiences a trance in which he remembers his old life. When he reaches the top and is unable to find a source, he returns to his apartment and thinks of cats eating him alive as he tries to fall asleep alone.

=== "A 'Poor Aunt' Story" ===
In a frame story, a man tells about his "poor aunt," an unremarkable and burdensome thing (usually a person, but it can also be an animal or a various object) that figuratively sticks to a certain person's back. His example is of an actual aunt at a wedding; at that wedding companions tell of their own various "poor aunts." Further, "poor aunts" will cease to exist when there is perfection, but this will not occur until the year 11,980.

=== "Nausea 1979" ===
From June 4 to July 14, 1979, a twenty-seven-year-old man vomits daily and receives regular phone calls in which a man says his name and hangs up. Since he regularly sleeps with his male friends wives or girlfriends as a whimsical hobby, he suspects the calls could be from a spiteful friend who does not want to directly confront him but the voice from the phone does not match any of his friends' voices. Further, no matter how hard he tries, he is unable to stop himself from vomiting the food he ate earlier in the day. He takes time off from work and stays at a hotel but the vomiting and calls do no stop.

One the final day of his ordeal in July, he receives the final mysterious call; he is asked by the voice "Do you know who I am?" before it hangs up forever. Mr. Murakami, the listener of this man's story, suggests that the calls could be from a private detective or it could be that the man is possibly schizophrenic. Both conclude that the ordeal the man went through his some hidden meaning and agree that it could again happen to either of them out of the blue.

=== "The Seventh Man" ===
A mid-fifties man dubbed "the seventh man" tells a story to a group about his childhood. When he was ten and lived in a small, seaside town most likely in Shizuoka Prefecture, he had a close friend named K. One day, a typhoon hits the area and while their town is in the eye, they go down to the beach; the seventh man is told by his father to return to the house as soon as winds pick up. While examining items of the beach, the seventh man sees a huge wave form and warns K by screaming to him but his warning falls on deaf ears; K is swallowed by the wave while the seventh man, on higher ground, is spared. A second wave forms but dies the moment before it is to hit the seventh man and in that moment he sees an apparition of K reaching out to him before he faints.

The seventh man wakes up a week later in the care of his family and learns that K disappeared without a trace. Many years go on without any evidence of K's remains coming to light; further, the seventh man is haunted by nightmares of K drowning and by the fact that no one outwardly blames him for K's disappearance. By the end of the year, he moves away to Komoro to get away from the town; he stays in the city for more than forty years but is still haunted by nightmares of K. He returns to the town and the beach where K disappeared in his fifties and goes through a storage shed which contains K's paintings. Despite the anguish he feels with merely possessing them he takes it with him back home to Komoro. He studies them and realizes that K's apparition was not looking at him with hatred and resentment all those years. He returns to the beach once more and surrenders himself to the water by falling face-first into the ocean. The seventh man finishes the story by telling his audience to not turn our backs on fear and not close our eyes when it strikes.

=== "The Year of Spaghetti" ===
A man only cooks and eats spaghetti in 1971. He sometimes imagines that people are knocking at his door, including dates, William Holden, or complete strangers. He receives a phone call in December of that year from an ex-girlfriend of his friend; she wants to know where to find him so she can get the money he owes her. The man does not tell her where he is despite knowing because he does not want to start more trouble and makes an excuse saying that he cannot talk because he is cooking spaghetti; he hangs up and never hears from her again.

=== "Tony Takitani" ===
Shozaburo Takitani is a jazz trombonist who is able to avoid many of the hardships of World War II by playing in clubs in Shanghai. He is imprisoned after the end of the war by the Chinese Army but is released in 1946; he returns to Japan and a year later and gets married. Tony Takitani is born in 1948 and his mother dies three days later. Because of this unfortunate event, Tony grows up without a true parent as his father is often away on musical tours and does not know much about being a father. Despite this, Tony is able to become a great illustrator and secures a well-paying job as a technical illustrator.

When Tony is thirty-seven years old, he falls in love with a twenty-two-year-old woman who visits his office on an errand. After pulling some strings to have her visit again, he asks her out to lunch. After a few dates he proposes to her; although unsure at first, she eventually agrees. For several years they are able to both live a carefree life, but when Tony points out to her that she buys an astronomical number of dresses and shoes, she begins to become self-conscious; she dies in an automobile collision shortly thereafter. To cope, he tries to hire a woman who has a body figure similar to his wife to wear his wife's clothing and work as a secretary in his office. When he finds a suitable candidate, he shows her his wife's wardrobe and the woman proceeded to cry over the beauty of the dresses. He tells her to take seven dresses and seven pairs of shoes for the week and to begin working tomorrow. After she leaves, he looks at the clothing and reconsiders; he calls the woman to tell her that he has rescinded the job offer but she is free to keep the dresses and shoes she has already taken for the week. Soon after Tony sells the remainder of his late wife's clothing for a fraction of the price. His father dies two years later and he sells all of his father's records for a decent price. After doing so, he feels that he is now truly alone.

=== "The Rise and Fall of Sharpie Cakes" ===
A man sees a newspaper advertisement for a "Sharpie Cakes" seminar and decides to go to it; there he meets over a thousand other people. They learn that the company who makes Sharpie Cakes wants a new recipe and will award over two million yen for the winning recipe. The man makes his own Sharpie Cakes and gives two batches to the company. He is called into the office and is told that his Sharpie Cakes are popular among the younger employees of the company but must pass one final test to be considered Sharpie Cakes. The man is escorted to a secure room with giant crows who only eat Sharpie Cakes. His recipe is presented to the birds and it causes a frenzy among them, causing his recipe to be dismissed from the competition. After exiting the company building, he decides that he will only make and eat food he wants to eat and not think about whether "crows" like it.

=== "The Ice Man" ===
A woman meets an "Ice Man" during her trip to a ski resort. The Ice Man is able to tell her everything about herself bar her future during their conversation. The two begin dating in Tokyo until they decide to get married; the woman's family is against the marriage because of her age (twenty) and the fact that very little is known about the Ice Man's history. After being married for a while, they are unable to conceive a child. The woman suggests that they go to the South Pole for a vacation. After weeks of planning, she tries to back out but the Ice Man tells her they have already committed too much and they end up flying there together. At the South Pole, there are scarce traces of an Ice Man settlement, but the Ice Man feels at home for the first time. They are able to conceive a child and spend the entire winter at the pole together, but the woman's happiness vanishes as she feels an incredible loneliness. She knows that her new family will never leave the South Pole.

=== "Crabs" ===
During a vacation in Singapore, a man and a woman in their twenties decide to eat at a restaurant serving crab meat. They eat at that same restaurant three straight days, and on their final night in the city-state, the man wakes up sick; he vomits the food content in the hotel toilet. He then notices that there are countless "worms" clinging to the crab meat which causes him to throw up bile; he gulps down mouthwash and flushes multiple times before returning to the bedroom. While observing the woman sleeping and the passing clouds, he resolves that he will never eat crab again.

=== "Firefly" ===
Note: In Norwegian Wood the "boy" is Toru, the "girl" is Naoko, the "best friend" is Kizuki, and the "roommate" is dubbed "Storm Trooper."

An eighteen-year-old boy moves to Tokyo to attend university and lives in an all-male dorm with interesting personalities; his roommate is an occasional stutterer and geography major who works out early in the morning and his dorm head requires that all tenants attend a flag ceremony each morning. He tells this to amuse the girl he "dates" (who goes to a different university than him) and afterward they explore Tokyo together on foot. Afterward, they say goodbye as she departs by train back to her apartment.

He first met the girl during his sophomore year of high school; she was his best friend's girlfriend and he would sometimes join them for get-togethers. However, the best friend committed suicide and he suspects this causes the girl to feel a disconnect with him because he was the last one to see the best friend alive and not her. They saw each other a few times after his death but nothing meaningful came from such "dates." He also internalizes the following philosophy: "Death is not the opposite of life, but a part of it."

When he is nineteen and a few months old in June, she turns twenty and they celebrate her birthday at her place. With just the two of them sharing dinner and alcohol, she loquaciously talks for hours past midnight; when the boy interrupts her to say that he needs to catch the last train home, she does not really hear him and continues speaking before she suddenly stops; she then sobs, and the boy does his best to comfort her and they end up having intercourse. He is shocked to learn that she is a virgin and this causes them further awkwardness; they spend the rest of the night with their backs to each other.

He leaves a note the following morning before exiting her apartment. He receives a letter response from her at the end of July telling him that she is taking a "leave of absence" from her university studies to spend time at a sanatorium in Kyoto. She also thanks him for his companionship and also asks him not to seek her out before ending with "goodbye." He is left utterly crestfallen. His roommate gives him a firefly in a jar and tells him to take care of it. When it is dark, he goes to the top of the dorm building to release the firefly but it takes forever to move. When it finally does leave the jar, he reaches out and tries to touch the darkness.

=== "Chance Traveller" ===
To begin the story, the narrator introduces himself as Haruki Murakami. He gives a personal anecdote about strange, life-changing experiences. While serving as a writer-in-residence at a college in Cambridge, Massachusetts from 1993 to 1995, Murakami frequented jazz clubs. During one visit, he got to see Tommy Flanagan play and admits he was underwhelmed for most of the performance; he imagines Flanagan asking for requests to which Murakami would ask for "Barbados" and "Star-Crossed Lovers." Suddenly Flanagan launches into a rendition of "Star-Crossed Lovers" and then "Barbados" without Murakami having to ask; the writer admits that the chances of him picking to play both of those specific pieces was one in a million. A second incident occurred some time later while he was exploring a used-record store; he finds a mint condition record of 10 to 4 at the 5 Spot and decides to buy it. As he leaves the store with his treasure, a man asks him for the time to which he replies, "Yeah, it's ten to four."

He then retells the story of his friend who had a similar strange, life-changing experience. This friend is a gay man who works as a piano tuner. During his music college days, he dates a girl but soon learns of his true sexual orientation and comes out. This causes him to stop talking with his sister because this news almost ruins her engagement. He is able to find a steady partner but they do not cohabitate due to his partner's job. About a decade later, he spends time at an outlet mall in the Kanagawa Prefecture reading Bleak House. One Tuesday, he is approached by a middle-aged, married mother about what book he is reading; they learn that they are both reading Bleak House. They soon start seeing each other more often and sharing lunches but when she insinuates that she wants to have intercourse, he tells her that he is gay. She tells him that this "tryst" has been so comforting for her because she is worried after receiving word that she has to return to the hospital because she may have breast cancer. The friend leaves the woman with the following advice: "If you have to choose between something that has form and something that doesn't, go for the one without form." Despite this, she feels jilted and does not frequent their special spot in the mall anymore.

Because of this acquaintance with this woman, the friend feels a need to reach out to his sister. He calls her and they agree to meet at his apartment. They catch up before she asks him why he called today of all days. He explains that "something" happened, and she reveals that she is going to the hospital tomorrow for an operation for breast cancer. Although flabbergasted, he still does not tell her his exact motivation for calling her. After his sister has a successful operation, he resumes a healthy relationship with her and her family, even getting the chance to teach their gifted daughter the piano.

Murakami and his friend agree that these happenings are more than "chance" and even joke that maybe there may be a "god of jazz" or a "god of gays." Murakami ends the story by saying that he hopes for the best for the woman who "coincidentally" influenced his friend's life.

=== "Hanalei Bay" ===
Sachi's son, an avid surfer, dies from drowning after going into cardiac arrest as a result of being attacked by a shark in Hanalei Bay. She travels from Tokyo to Honolulu and then to Lihue to confirm that it is her son's body for the police. After confirming that it is him, she asks for him to be cremated so that she can take his ashes back to Japan. Sachi visits the hotel the next day to pay her late son's bill but learns that lodges there must pay before staying. She subsequently makes yearly visits to Hanalei for ten years to commemorate her son's passing. One day, she decides to pick up Japanese hitchhikers. She gives them advice on where to stay and to look out for hard drugs.

Sachi was a talented pianist in her younger years but began to hit her ceiling early. As a result, she decided to study the culinary arts in Chicago. She worked as a pianist in a bar to fund herself but was deported after an officer caught her without a license to work in the states. She got married at twenty-four and had her only son two years later. The father died prematurely when she is in her thirties from a drug overdose. After his death, she opened a bar but was not able to maintain a strong bond with her son as he ages. Nonetheless, she plays piano at her bar whenever she feels the need to do so.

Back in Hanalei, she decides to play piano at a restaurant as she is more skilled than the regular. She again meets the two hitchhikers who thank her for her help. Then a former marine enters the restaurant and demands that Sachi play a piece for him. When she tells him that she is not employed here, he becomes belligerent and has to be restrained by the owner; the disgruntled ex-marine leaves without much of a fuss due to him being friends with the owner. The hitchhikers then tell Sachi that they saw a one-legged Japanese surfer riding the waves. Convinced that is her son, she spends the next few days asking around about the surfer and keeping a lookout but she is not able to see him and returns home to Tokyo after three weeks. She runs into one of the hitchhikers eight months later in Tokyo and they briefly talk. She continues her routine of playing piano at her bar while thinking of Hanalei Bay.

=== "Where I'm Likely to Find It" ===
In Tokyo, a woman's father-in-law is killed in a streetcar accident, leaving her mother-in-law a widow. The mother-in-law then moves into the same building as the woman and her husband so that the couple can be near her; they live two floors above her in a high-rise. One day, they receive a phone call from the mother-in-law asking for her son to come down; she has cardiac problems. After he is done, he calls his wife and asks her to prepare pancakes and that he will return soon; after a while, he does not come back which causes the woman to call the police and eventually file a missing person report.

A private detective agrees to work pro bono searching for the husband in the building stairs; the husband never uses the elevator. He suspects that the man could be a stockbroker turned painter (like Paul Gauguin) who suddenly moves to Tahiti to pursue his new passion but ultimately shoots that idea down, realizing that he disappeared without taking his wallet and other essentials. Near the beginning of his search, he meets a jogger running up the stairs who says he saw the husband using the stairs but did not know him well. Later on, he meets an elderly man who lived on the same floor as the husband and knew the man but never discussed anything meaningful with him. A few weeks later, he talks with a young girl but refrains from doing anything suspicious or mentioning that he is looking for the husband; they instead talk about donuts and he says he is looking for a “door.”

The woman calls twenty days after the disappearance to tell the detective that her husband has been discovered at Sendai Station; the last thing he remembers is heading back to his place for pancakes with his wife. She thanks him for his efforts and the man resolves that he will continue his search for the “door.”

=== "The Kidney-Shaped Stone That Moves Every Day" ===
Although distant from his father, thirty-one-year-old Junpei takes to heart his father's words that a man will only know three women “that have real meaning for him.” Junpei is sure he has already met his first, but she ended up marrying his friend and is wary of meeting his second too soon; thus, he does not engage in a meaningful relationship for some time.

He meets Kirie, a woman five years older than him, at a French restaurant and they begin a relationship. He tells her that he is a short story writer but she is surreptitious regarding her profession. Nonetheless, she takes an interest in his writing and inspires him to write a story about a woman doctor who has an affair with a married surgeon. During a trip, the doctor finds a kidney-shaped stone and takes it back to her office to use as a paperweight. The stone begins appearing in a moment in the woman's life and she begins to think it has supernatural abilities; however, it always returns to the same position in her office when she comes in each morning. She decides to get rid of it by throwing it far into the ocean, but it still returns to her desk. When Junpei finishes writing the story, he calls Kirie to share it with her but he is unable to get through to her. He nonetheless submits it for publication and it gets accepted in a major literary journal.

Months go by before he hears her voice on a taxi radio; it is at their point he learns that she owns a business of high-rise building window washers and her passion is tightrope walking between high-rise buildings without a lifeline. He also learns that she has been in Germany the past few months performing her craft. Despite not being able to speak to her again, he is inspired to write more than ever before and decides that she was influential enough to be “number two,” but starts to doubt the meaningfulness of his father's theory. The woman doctor story ends with the stone disappearing from her desk.

This story shares several similarities with Murakami's earlier story “Honey Pie.”

=== "A Shinagawa Monkey" ===
Mizuki forgets her name when she is asked what it is by others. Her surname is Ando, the name she took after marrying her husband, but still uses her maiden name Ozawa professionally. After reading about a counseling center established for residents of the Shinagawa ward in the newspaper, she decides to book and attend a session in hopes of getting to the root of her worry. There, she meets Mrs. Tetsuko Sakaki who is open to listening to her story. Mizuki tells about her upbringing in Nagoya and how she moved to Yokohama to go to college.

In subsequent sessions, Mrs. Sakaki asks her to tell her an event relating to names. Mizuki tells her the story about how her classmate Yuko Matsunaka came to her to talk shortly she committed suicide; she talked about jealousy and asked her to keep her “dorm name tag” for her so that it would not be stolen. During that talk, Mizuki learns that she has never felt jealousy in her life. That night at home, she searches for the name tags (hers and Yuko's) but is not able to locate them.

During her tenth session, Mrs. Sakaki says that they have found the reason for her forgetfulness: a monkey stole the name tags; Mr. Sakaki and his associate Sakurada have now caught the monkey. The women meet the two men and the monkey. When the monkey demonstrates the ability to talk, they interrogate it. The monkey stole the names because it has an irresistible urge to steal names; in doing so, he is able to learn profound things about them as well as partially deprive them of the memory of their own names. Sakurada suggests that they kill the monkey to alleviate the problem, but Mr. Sakaki says that might cause further problems with animal rights groups. Mizuki suggests that they let the monkey live as long as he tells them about the profound things associated with her name; they agree. The monkey says that when he stole her name, he learned that her mother and sister never loved her and that her marriage is static; Mizuki agrees that she suspected that was the case but is now sure thanks to the monkey. Mr. Sakaki says that he will take the monkey to Mount Takao; the monkey promises never to return to the city. As Mizuki leaves with the name tags, Mrs. Sakaki tells her that if she has any other things she wants to discuss, she is always welcomed to return.

== Awards ==
- Frank O'Connor International Short Story Award – 2006
- Kiriyama Prize – 2007 – acceptance declined by Murakami "for reasons of personal principle".
