= Underground (Murakami book) =

1997 non-fiction book by Haruki Murakami

Underground: The Tokyo Gas Attack and the Japanese Psyche
- First edition (Japanese)
- Author: Haruki Murakami
- Original title: アンダーグラウンド; Andāguraundo
- Translator: Alfred Birnbaum, Philip Gabriel
- Language: Japanese, English
- Subject: Interviews
- Published: 20 March 1997 (Kodansha) (JP); 1 June 2000 (The Harvill Press) (UK); 1 June 2000 (Vintage International) (US)
- Publication place: Japan
- Media type: Print (Hardcover)
- Pages: 366 (US); 309 (UK)
- ISBN: 0-375-72580-6
- OCLC: 45620755
- Dewey Decimal: 364.15/23/0952 21
- LC Class: BP605.O88 M8613 2001

Underground: The Tokyo Gas Attack and the Japanese Psyche (アンダーグラウンド, Andāguraundo; 1997–1998) is a book by Japanese writer Haruki Murakami about the 1995 Aum Shinrikyo sarin gas attack on the Tokyo subway. The book is made up of a series of interviews with individuals who were affected by the attacks, and the English translation also includes interviews with members of Aum, the religious cult responsible for the attacks. Murakami hoped that through these interviews, he could capture a side of the attacks which the sensationalist Japanese media had ignored—the way it had affected average citizens. The interviews were conducted over nearly a year, starting in January 1996 and ending in December of that same year.

The interviews highlight many intriguing aspects of the Japanese psyche. Work was a high, if not central, priority for most of the interviewees. Isolation, individualism, and lack of communication were also strong themes which were common throughout many accounts of the attacks. Many of the interviewees expressed disillusionment with the materialism in Japanese society and the sensationalistic media, as well as the inefficiency of the emergency response system in dealing with the attack.

The book also includes Murakami's personal essay on the attacks, "Blind Nightmare: Where Are We Japanese Going?" In this essay, he criticizes the failure of the Japanese to learn from the attacks, preferring to dismiss it as the extreme act by a group of lunatics rather than analyze the true causes and prevent similar events from occurring in the future.

Both the Japanese original and the English translation were well-received, despite the former being criticized as being "one-sided", and the latter being severely abridged.

== History ==
Described as a work of "journalistic literature", Underground was originally published as a series of separate interviews Murakami conducted with 60 victims of the attacks and descriptions of how the attacks were carried out, along with his essay, "Blind Nightmare: Where Are We Japanese Going?" In 2000, an English translation was published which included interviews with eight members of Aum.

Underground was originally published in Japan without the interviews of Aum members – they were published in the magazine Bungei Shunju before being collected in a separate volume, The Place That Was Promised. The English translation combines both books into a single volume, but has been abridged. Underground was translated by Alfred Birnbaum and The Place That Was Promised by Philip Gabriel.

== Motivations ==
In his introduction to the book, Murakami describes his motivations for writing it:

The Japanese media had bombarded us with so many in-depth profiles of the Aum cult perpetrators—the 'attackers'—forming such a slick, seductive narrative that the average citizen—the 'victim'—was an afterthought ... which is why I wanted, if at all possible, to get away from any formula; to recognise that each person on the subway that morning had a face, a life, a family, hopes and fears, contradictions and dilemmas—and that all these factors had a place in the drama ...

Furthermore, I had a hunch that we needed to see a true picture of all the survivors, whether they were severely traumatized or not, in order to better grasp the whole incident.

Jay Rubin holds that Murakami also had highly personal reasons for wanting to write Underground, notably that he wished to learn more about Japan after living almost entirely abroad for nine years and that he wanted to fulfill a responsibility he felt towards Japan's society.

== Method ==
The interviews in Underground were conducted throughout 1996. They were taped, transcribed, and then edited. Draft interviews were then sent to the interviewees before publication for fact-checking and to allow them to cut any parts they did not want published.

At the start of each interview, Murakami asked general questions about the subject's life, allowing him to build a background picture of them that is included before each interview. He did this to "give each a 'face'", thus avoiding creating "a collection of disembodied voices". His interviews with victims have been seen as similar in style to those of Studs Terkel's Working, an influence that Murakami acknowledges along with that of journalist Bob Greene. His interviews with Aum members are intentionally more combative.

== Conclusions ==
Murakami concludes Underground with his essay "Blind Nightmare: Where Are We Japanese Going?" The essay is primarily a criticism of the Japanese response to the gas attacks, not only in terms of the actions which were taken, but also in terms of the mentality adopted by most Japanese after the attack. He notes that there is a polemic which was put forth by the media and too readily accepted by the Japanese people, positing the attacks as a matter of "good" versus "evil", "sanity" versus "madness", "Us" versus "Them". By viewing the sarin attacks as "an extreme and exceptional crime committed by an isolated lunatic fringe", it was easy for Japanese citizens to avoid facing the darker realities (which Murakami also refers to as the "underground", adding a deeper layer of meaning to the book's title) of both Japanese society and their own selves.

In the course of conducting his interviews, Murakami observed that "most Japanese seem ready to pack up the whole incident in a trunk labeled THINGS OVER AND DONE WITH", but this mentality prevents them from learning from the event. In particular, Murakami criticizes the Japanese crisis management system as being "erratic and sorely inadequate". He further worries that the government's lack of openness about its failings may lead to the repetition of past mistakes. Murakami also discusses one factor that led to the attacks: the handing over of personal responsibility by cult members to Aum leader Shoko Asahara. However, he notes that perhaps everyone, himself included, does this to an extent, accepting someone else's "narrative" rather than take the responsibility of creating their own.

== Reception ==
The original Underground (without Aum interviews) was seen by some critics as being "one-sided", a view that Murakami himself shared, leading to his publishing The Place That Was Promised. The book sold 270,000 copies within two months of its Japanese release.

Reviews of the English translation of Underground were largely positive and enthusiastic, despite a severe cut in the number of commuter interviews included in the work, from 62 in the original to 34 in the translation. Globally, Complete Review says on the consensus, "Enthusiastic, although the reviews tend to be descriptive rather than critical".

== Common themes ==
While the book is made up of narratives from individuals of widely varying backgrounds, the stories share common themes, and together, they reveal many intriguing aspects of the Japanese psyche and the values of Japanese society as a whole. In particular, they present an insight into the lifestyle and mentality of Japanese commuters (since the attacks occurred in the morning, nearly all of the interviewees were caught in the subway while making their morning commute).

One of the most prominent themes was the value and importance which the interviewees placed on their jobs. Working overtime seemed to be normal for the interviewees; many spoke of waking up early so they could arrive at work up to 90 minutes before it officially began. Although they were suffering from extreme physical symptoms from inhaling sarin, most of the interviewees continued on their way to work, only reporting to the hospital for treatment when unable to carry out their responsibilities at work, or under the insistence of a colleague or superior. Several of the interviewees returned to work quite soon after the attacks, despite not being fully recovered. One salesman said, "Honestly, it would have been better for me to take some time off with sick pay, but the company wasn't that generous. It was nine to five, plus overtime just like always."

Also significant was the theme of isolation and disconnection between the commuters. Despite the noticeable discomfort caused by the gas, most of the interviewees did not bother to ask other passengers what was going on, preferring to wait until the next stop to change trains and distance themselves from the situation. One interviewee said, "No one said a thing, everyone was so quiet. No response, no communication. I lived in America for a year, and believe me, if the same thing had happened in America there would have been a real scene. With everyone shouting, "What's going on here?" and coming together to find the cause." Also, passengers that lost consciousness remained lying on the floor for some time, exposed to the sarin. Commuters, with a few notable exceptions, did not attempt to help them, instead waiting for employees whose authority allowed them to intervene.

Many of the interviewees also expressed a level of disillusionment with Japanese society and its emphasis on the material, often at the expense of the spiritual or moral side of the society. One interviewee assessed the situation, saying, "we've lost any sense of crisis and material things are all that matters. The idea that it's wrong to harm other has gradually disappeared." Another interviewee, a subway worker, said, "I already knew society had gotten to the point where something like Aum had to happen ... It's a question of morals." Several interviewees also voiced criticism of the media, especially due to the way it misrepresented and sensationalized the sarin attacks. Murakami himself expressed similar sentiments in the book's preface.

== Sources ==
- Complete Review (2002). "Underground". Complete Review.
- Kavitha, Rao; Murakami, Mutsuko (1997). "The Human Cost". Asiaweek. Archived from the original on 22 May 2001.
- Murakami, Haruki (2000). Underground. New York: Vintage. ISBN 978-0-375-72580-7. Trans. Alfred Birnbaum and Philip Gabriel.
- Orthofer, M.A. (2006). "Underground by Murakami Haruki". the complete review.
- Rubin, Jay (2002). Haruki Murakami and the Music of Words. London: Harvill. ISBN 978-1-86046-986-2.
- Treisman, Deborah (10 February 2019). "The Underground Worlds of Haruki Murakami". New Yorker.
