= The 1963/1982 Girl from Ipanema =

1982 short story by Haruki Murakami

- Short story by Haruki Murakami
- Original title: 1963/1982年のイパネマ娘; 1963/1982-nen no Ipanema-musume
- Translator: Jay Rubin
- Country: Japan
- Language: Japanese
- Genre(s): short story, magical realism

Publication
- Published in: カンガルー日和; Kangarū biyori
- Publication type: anthology
- Publisher: 平凡社; Heibonsha
- Media type: print
- Publication date: 1983
- Published in English: 2018 (The Penguin Book of Japanese Short Stories)

The 1963/1982 Girl from Ipanema (1963/1982年のイパネマ娘; 1963/1982-nen no Ipanema-musume) is a short story by Japanese author Haruki Murakami, written in 1982. The title references "The Girl from Ipanema", the famous Bossa nova song that was first released in March 1964 in the album Getz/Gilberto. The story follows the musings of an unnamed narrator as he contemplates the song, detailing one memory to the next. It culminates in his meeting with the metaphysical girl from the song, and his expression of longing for a union with her.

The story was first translated into English by Jay Rubin in 2002, with excerpts appearing in his book Haruki Murakami and the Music of Words, in 2005. A full English translation was intended to be included in Blind Willow, Sleeping Woman (2006), an anthology of short stories by Murakami; but it was omitted from the final publication. The full story remained unpublished until 2018 when it was included in The Penguin Book of Japanese Short Stories.

== Plot ==
The story begins with an excerpt of lyrics from "The Girl from Ipanema", which leads the unnamed narrator to reminisce, in the first-person perspective, about the Girl from Ipanema. He states that she has not aged, and that the lyrics capture exactly how she was back in 1963, and in present 1982. He entertains the thought of how she would have aged, but asserts that naturally, she has not aged in his record of the song, where she is bathed in the sound of Stan Getz's tenor sax.

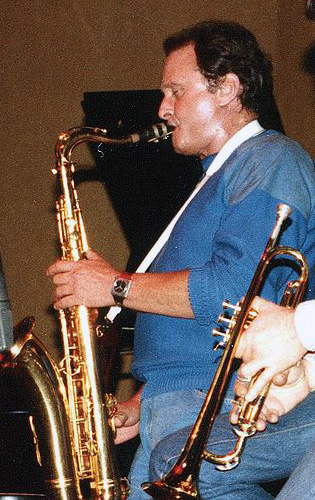
Stan Getz, pictured above, played the saxophone solo in The Girl from Ipanema, from the 1963 album Getz/Gilberto. He is mentioned directly in this Murakami short story.

The song evokes memories of a dark, quiet corridor in his high school. The narrator cannot discern as to why the two are connected, given his perceived absence of any connection. Equally perplexing, is his subsequent association between the corridor and salad (naming various vegetables and Thousand Island dressing). And attached to salad, is the memory of a girl the narrator used to know, which does not surprise him, as the girl only ever ate Salads.

His reminiscence of this girl is interjected by a quote from a philosopher: “[Long long ago,] there was a time when matter and memory were separated by a metaphysical abyss". The narrator then finds himself in the landscape evoked by the song - a windless beach with searing sun - watching the girl from Ipanema walk by.

The narrator initiates a conversation with the Girl from Ipanema, offering her a can of beer. Since she is weary from the walk, she agrees, and the two drink beneath the narrator's beach umbrella. He ventures to tell her that they met in 1963 at the same place and time, to which she downs half a can in one go, and stares at its opening- something about the way she stares at the beer can opening makes the narrator aware of its metaphysical significance.

He proceeds to tell her that she has not aged in the least bit, to which she replies, "Of course not. I’m a metaphysical girl". He offers her another beer, which she politely declines, saying that she has to keep walking indefinitely. The narrator asks whether the soles of her feet get hot from walking, to which she replies that they do not, as they are "completely metaphysical". She offers her foot to the narrator and he acknowledges this.

He decides to admit to her that whenever he thinks of her, he associates her with the corridor in his high school. She replies, "the human essence lies in complexity … Live! Live! Live! … the most important thing is to go on living". To which, the author departs the metaphysical world of the song.

The ending takes place in the real world, where the narrator notes that he sometimes recognises the girl from Ipanema on the subway – though not often. Despite not having conversed since their meeting on the beach, he intuits a connection linking their hearts. The narrator imagines how the connection is "probably in a strange place in a far-off world". He ends his contemplation with the conviction that such a strange place must exist "somewhere in the world".

== Background ==
In his introduction to The Penguin Book of Japanese Short Stories, Murakami describes "The Girl from Ipanema" as one of his best-loved pieces of music. In addition, he expresses admiration for the saxophone improvisation in the track, played by Stan Getz. He also states that this piece of music sees recurrent use in his works. For example, in Norwegian Wood, it is one of the Bossa nova pieces played by Reiko for the protagonist Watanabe and his girlfriend Naoko (the original Japanese version names the song explicitly while the English translations do not).

== Style ==
The story, like all of Murakami's novels, is written from the first-person perspective, the use of which, stems from traditional Japanese literature. The narrator is also nameless - a characteristic of Murakami's early works, as he only supplied explicit names for his narrators a decade into his career. A further subtlety in the Japanese texts, is that Murakami's narrator consistently refers to himself using Boku, a Japanese first-person pronoun only used amongst those one is familiar and comfortable with. Rubin notes that, as one of Murakami's storytelling tools, the use of this informal pronoun is indispensable.

In the story, Murakami employs magical realism and references to Western culture, two trademark characteristics of his style.

=== References to Western culture ===
One prominent feature of Murakami's style is his reference to Western culture, so much so that this element of his writing is possibly the most cited (and criticised). Many examples of this exist in the story. The title directly references "The Girl from Ipanema", a world-renowned Bossa nova song. The story also directly references the saxophonist Stan Getz. Other references to Western media include The Strawberry Statement, a book depicting student protests at Columbia University. The unnamed narrator uses this book when describing his friend who ate salad, and also mentions Thousand Island dressing, an American salad dressing. The narrator also closely quotes French-Jewish philosopher Henri-Louis Bergson: "matter and memory were separated by a metaphysical abyss". This comes from Chapter 5 of Bergson's book Matter and Memory.

Western music plays an important part in Murakami's other works: his novel, Norwegian Wood takes after the John Lennon song of the same name; In Hard-Boiled Wonderland and the End of the World, the song "Danny Boy" is an important device for the development of the protagonist.

M.A. Orthofer states that Murakami's extensive use of pop references is in no small part the reason why he is more internationally acclaimed than other Japanese writers of his generation, as they make his works more accessible for the English-speaking reader. Rubin considers Murakami the first post-war writer whose works assimilate American culture in a positive light, in contrast to contemporaries such as Ryū Murakami and Akiyuki Nosaka (who wrote Grave of the Fireflies, the famous short story about the bombing of Kobe). Rubin even argues that Murakami's use of Western references signifies how older generation's ideologies have been spurned by Murakami's generation.

=== Use of Magical Realism ===
Broadly speaking, magical realism is the style of imbuing a realistic setting or object, with phantasmagorical, magical elements. Murakami's work is generally considered as belonging to this genre. As Matthew C. Strecher notes, nearly all Murakami's works of fiction exemplify this style – they establish first a realistic setting, which is then abruptly "disrupted" by fantastical or magical elements (Norwegian Wood stands as an exception to this).

In Murakami's magical realism, the fantastical element is the process where the protagonist encounters his/her unconscious mind, so that the shift from the realistic to magical, represents a shift from the protagonist's conscious world to their unconscious one. Thus, in "1963/1982 Girl from Ipanema", magical realism occurs in the inexplicable association of the song with the protagonist's high school corridor, and subsequently, the connection with salad and his childhood friend.

Strecher analyses the technique involved: Murakami starts in the protagonist’s mind, presenting an object which holds nostalgic value. Then, he creates connections from the object, which commonly involve memories of long-lost friends. Finally, the object which once had only existed in the protagonist's mind, not manifests itself in the natural world, as a result of the protagonist's desire. This same technique is used in Murakami's "A ‘Poor-Aunt’ Story".

Mayer considers Murakami's use of magical realism similar to that of Banana Yoshimoto, another contemporary Japanese writer. This is because, their characters are mostly isolated and emotionally unfulfilled individuals, for which magical realism acts as a means of catharsis.

== Reception ==
Jay Rubin said of the story that it is one of Murakami's ‘most musical’. He notes the close resemblance between the mood evoked by the story, and that which pervades "The Girl from Ipanema" song. Because of this, he asserts that readers unfamiliar with the song may not necessarily be able to appreciate the story to its full extent. Furthermore, Rubin considers the story "vintage Murakami", in that it encompasses themes such as longing for the unity of Self and Other, and the metaphysical relationship between reality and the unconscious.

Strecher considers the use of Magical Realism in this story superficial compared to its use in Murakami's more extensive works such as 1973-nen no pinboru. He considers the story "at best" an attempt to link together objects of sentimental value, likening it to a simple experiment in "Word Association". To reinforce his argument, he uses Masao Miyoshi's claim that Murakami's work is nothing but "a symbol deciphering game".

For Rubin, the story is a perfect example of the "un-Japanese" impression of Murakami's works. In his article "The Other World of Murakami Haruki", Rubin juxtaposes Murakami's work against that of Japanese Nobel Prize winner Yasunari Kawabata- where Kawabata steeps his works exclusively in the world of Japan (thus fulfilling the conventions expected of Japanese writers), Murakami establishes his works in "other worlds", for example in the landscape of "The Girl from Ipanema" song. It is this which leads Rubin to pronounce that Murakami's style is "un-Japanese", even going so far as to pose the question of whether Murakami is attempting to subvert the conventions of Japanese literature.

For Heather H. Yeung, the story, through its use of the Bossa nova song, characterises the gender Archetypes typical of Murakami's work. She asserts that it is most often a female character who precipitates the male narrator's next stage of development, as movement between the "real" pragmatic world, and the "spiritual" reflective one. Furthermore, she points that the lyrics of the Bossa nova song (which appear at the beginning of the story), inform the plot of the story, in that both the narrator and the Girl from Ipanema adhere to the roles given to them in the lyrics.

Susan Napier considers the Girl from Ipanema in the story as being are endowed with a memorable, individual personality; she uses this story to elaborate how Murakami's general work is a rare example of the positive characterisation of women, in contrast to the majority of postwar Japanese fantasy literature written by Males.

Murakami himself has expressed criticism towards the story- its message remains ‘a little puzzling’ for himself, and he concedes that as a piece of literature, it may be lacking certain necessary qualities.
