= Birthday Girl (short story) =

- Short story by Haruki Murakami
- Standalone Harvill Secker edition published in 2019 to celebrate the author's 70th birthday Cover design by Suzanne Dean
- Original title: バースデイ・ガール
- Translator: Jay Rubin
- Country: Japan
- Language: Japanese
- Genre: Short story

Publication
- Published in: Harper's (2003), Blind Willow, Sleeping Woman (2006)
- Media type: Print
- Publication date: 2002
- Published in English: 2003

"Birthday Girl" (バースデイ・ガール, Bāsudei gāru = Birthday girl) is a short story written by Japanese writer Haruki Murakami, and first published in 2002. After reading "Timothy's Birthday" by William Trevor and "The Moor" by Russell Banks, Murakami felt haunted and decided to collect more birthday-themed stories for an anthology. Murakami was putting together Birthday Stories (2002 in Japanese, 2004 in English), his anthology of short stories on the theme of birthdays, and wrote "Birthday Girl" especially for it.

== Plot summary ==
In a frame story, a married woman with children recounts to her friend what happened on her twentieth birthday (the age of majority in Japan at the time this was written. In 2022, it was changed to 18). The woman begins by saying she spent that day working overtime as a waitress at an Italian restaurant in Roppongi because her friend called in sick at the last minute. The reclusive owner of the restaurant who lives on the sixth floor gets his food delivered to him room service-style by the manager of the restaurant every night at 8pm. The manager falls ill the night of the woman's birthday so the woman is delegated the responsibility of bringing the owner his food.

The woman knocks on the door that evening and finds an elderly man at the door. After explaining the situation, he invites her into the room and asks for five minutes of her time; she agrees. He asks how old she is and she responds that she is twenty now, indirectly telling him that today is her birthday. After saying "Happy Birthday" to her, he tells her that he can grant her one wish. She makes her wish, leaves the room, and never meets the owner again.

Her friend asks her if her wish came true and if she would have wished for something else in hindsight. She says that time will determine if her wish came true and semi-deflects the second question by asking the friend what she would wish for if she was in the woman's position; the friend is unsure and the woman says that is because "you've already made your wish."

== Analysis ==
The setting creates an intense mood for the story. The incessant rain creates an atmosphere that disrupts the ordinary, mundane circumstances of serving tables on one's 20th birthday. Like most Murakami tales, there is a story within a story, which adds to the work's effect. The wish itself is left a mystery to the reader, in keeping with the tradition of never revealing a birthday wish to others.
