= The Penguin Book of Japanese Short Stories =

2018 anthology edited by Jay Rubin

- Editor: Jay Rubin
- Genre: Short stories, literary fiction, speculative fiction
- Publisher: Penguin Classics
- Publication date: September 11, 2018
- Pages: 576
- ISBN: 978-0141395623

The Penguin Book of Japanese Short Stories is a 2018 English language anthology of Japanese literature edited by American translator Jay Rubin and published by Penguin Classics. With 34 stories, the collection spans centuries of short stories from Japan ranging from the early-twentieth-century works of Ryūnosuke Akutagawa and Jun'ichirō Tanizaki up to more modern works by Mieko Kawakami and Kazumi Saeki. The book features an introduction by Japanese writer and longtime Rubin collaborator Haruki Murakami.

== Critical reception ==
GQ placed the book on their 17 Best Books of 2018 list, lauding Rubin's choice to arrange short stories by theme rather than chronological time. In 2024, The Atlantic featured it in an article recommending short story collections. Chimamanda Ngozi Adichie included it in her profile in The New York Times.

The Japan Times called the book's structure "a recipe for success" with categories that "best showcase ... unique tastes." The Japan Society observed Rubin's "necessarily selective" and thematically organized collection, writing that "A reader prepared for the new and unexpected will not be disappointed." The Asian Review of Books wrote that "the collection has a unique, often edgy, surprising quality" due to its thematic organization, as well as its inclusion of stories from lesser-known and typically underrepresented writers.

== Stories ==
The book's short stories are organized by theme.

Japan and the West
Title	Author	Translator
"The Story of Tomoda and Matsunaga"	Jun'ichirō Tanizaki	Paul Warham
"Behind the Prison"	Kafū Nagai	Jay Rubin
Sanshirō (excerpt)	Natsume Sōseki	Jay Rubin

Loyal Warriors
Title	Author	Translator
"The Last Testament of Okitsu Yagoemon"	Mori Ōgai	Richard Bowring
"Patriotism"	Yukio Mishima	Geoffrey W. Sargent

Men and Women
Title	Author	Translator
"Flames"	Yūko Tsushima	Geraldine Harcourt
"In the Box"	Kōno Taeko	Jay Rubin
"Remaining Flowers"	Kenji Nakagami	Eve Zimmerman
"Bee Honey"	Banana Yoshimoto	Michael Emmerich
"The Smile of a Mountain Witch"	Minako Oba	Noriko Mizuta
"A Bond for Two Lifetimes–Gleanings"	Fumiko Enchi	Phyllis Birnbaum

Nature and Memory
Title	Author	Translator
"Peaches"	Akira Abe	Jay Rubin
"The Tale of the House of Physics"	Yōko Ogawa	Ted Goossen
"Unforgettable People"	Doppo Kunikida	Jay Rubin
"The 1963/1982 Girl from Ipanema"	Haruki Murakami	Jay Rubin
"Cambridge Circus"	Motoyuki Shibata	Jay Rubin

Modern Life and Other Nonsense
Title	Author	Translator
"Mr English"	Keita Genji	Jay Rubin
"Factory Town"	Minoru Betsuyaku	Royall Tyler
"Dreams of Love, Etc."	Mieko Kawakami	Hitomi Yoshio
"Shoulder-Top Secretary"	Shinichi Hoshi	Jay Rubin

Dread
Title	Author	Translator
"Hell Screen"	Ryūnosuke Akutagawa	Jay Rubin
"Filling Up with Sugar"	Yuten Sawanishi	Jay Rubin
"Kudan"	Hyakken Uchida	Rachel DiNitto

Disasters, Natural and Man-Made
Title	Author	Translator
The Great Kantō Earthquake, 1923
"The Great Earthquake and General Kim"	Ryūnosuke Akutagawa	Jay Rubin
The Atomic Bombings, 1945
"Hiroshima, City of Doom"	Yōko Ōta	Richard Minear
"Insects"	Yuichi Seirai	Paul Warham
Post-war Japan
"The Silver Fifty-Sen Pieces"	Yasunari Kawabata	Lane Dunlop
"American Hijiki"	Akiyuki Nosaka	Jay Rubin
"Pink"	Tomoyuki Hoshino	Brian Bergstrom
The Kobe Earthquake, 1995
"UFO in Kushiro"	Haruki Murakami	Jay Rubin
Tōhoku Earthquake, Tsunami and Nuclear Meltdown, 2011
"Weather-Watching Hill"	Kazumi Saeki	David Boyd
"Planting"	Aoko Matsuda	Angus Turvill
"Same as Always"	Yuya Sato	Rachel DiNitto
