= Birthday Stories =

2002 book by Haruki Murakami

First edition (publ. 中央公論新社)

Birthday Stories (バースデイ・ストーリーズ, Bāsudei sutōrīzu = Birthday stories) is a 2002 short story anthology edited by Japanese author Haruki Murakami. Despite the theme's happy connotations, most of the short stories have a dark, melancholic atmosphere.

== Editions ==
Murakami selected and translated the texts, adding an original short story of his own (later collected into his Blind Willow, Sleeping Woman, 2006). For the English edition at Harvill Press (using the original English-language versions of the stories), he added an introduction and selected one more story, Claire Keegan’s “Close to the Water’s Edge”. For the Japanese reprint, he added the translation of Keegan’s story, and one more story, Lewis Robinson’s “The ride”. The main editions are thus:

- 2002: Japanese-language, 11 stories.
- 2004: English-language, 12 stories plus introduction.
- 2006: Japanese-language, 13 stories.

== Contents ==
The 2004 English edition of the anthology starts with an introduction by Haruki Murakami, where he speaks about his birthday and of birthdays in general (for example he mentions his visit to Jack London's farm, which he made because he liked London's writings and because they share the same birthday).

It compiles:

- ("Introduction : My birthday, your birthday", by Haruki Murakami — added to English ed. only)
- "Forever Overhead" (by David Foster Wallace)
- "Turning" (by Lynda Sexson)
- "The Birthday Cake" (by Daniel Lyons)
- "Timothy's Birthday" (by William Trevor)
- "Dundun" (by Denis Johnson)
- "The Moor" (by Russell Banks)
- "Angel of Mercy, Angel of Death" (by Ethan Canin)
- "The Birthday Present" (by Andrea Lee)
- "The Bath" (by Raymond Carver)
- "A Game of Dice" (by Paul Theroux)
- "Close to the Water's Edge" (by Claire Keegan) — (added to 2004 English hardback edition, 2006 Japanese edition and 2006 English paperback edition.)
- "The Ride" (by Lewis Robinson) — (added to 2006 Japanese edition and English paperback only)
- "Birthday Girl" (by Haruki Murakami)
