= 1Q84 =

2009–2010 novel by Haruki Murakami

- Cover of Book 1
- Author: Haruki Murakami
- Translator: Jay Rubin; Philip Gabriel
- Language: Japanese
- Genre: Alternate history, parallel worlds
- Publisher: Shinchosha
- Publication date: May 29, 2009 (Books 1 and 2); April 16, 2010 (Book 3)
- Publication place: Japan
- English publication date: October 25, 2011
- Media type: Print (hardcover)
- Pages: 928
- ISBN: 978-0-307-59331-3
- OCLC: 701017688

US edition of 1Q84, first published in 2011 by Knopf

1Q84 (いちきゅうはちよん, Ichi-Kyū-Hachi-Yon; stylized in the Japanese cover as "ichi-kew-hachi-yon") is a novel written by Japanese writer Haruki Murakami, first published in three volumes in Japan in 2009–2010. It covers a fictionalized year of 1984 in parallel with a "real" one. The novel is a story of how a woman named Aomame begins to notice strange changes occurring in the world. She is quickly caught up in a plot involving Sakigake, a religious cult, and her childhood love, Tengo, and embarks on a journey to discover what is "real".

The novel's first printing sold out on the day it was released and sales reached a million within a month. The English-language edition of all three volumes, with the first two volumes translated by Jay Rubin and the third by Philip Gabriel, was released in North America and the United Kingdom on October 25, 2011. An excerpt from the novel appeared in the September 5, 2011 issue of The New Yorker magazine as "Town of Cats". The first chapter of 1Q84 had also been read as an excerpt in the Selected Shorts series at Symphony Space in New York.

== Plot summary ==
The events of 1Q84 take place in Tokyo during a fictionalized version of the year 1984, with the first volume set between April and June, the second between July and September, and the third between October and December.

The first two books have a dual narrative (like several of Murakami's earlier novels). One tells the story of a man called Tengo Kawana and the other follows a woman called Aomame. Their stories draw closer together and eventually unite into a single narrative. In book three, a third protagonist is added in Ushikawa, a character who had appeared in Murakami's earlier novel, The Wind-up Bird Chronicle. All the main characters are united by a trait of being able to see two moons appearing.

The book begins with Aomame getting out of a taxi on the Shuto Expressway. After descending down the stairs, during a traffic jam, on a highway, she starts to realize that she has crossed into what seems to be an alternate reality. This world is very similar to hers but with several differences, the most obvious of which is that the Earth now has two moons.

It is revealed that Aomame is a hitwoman and that she specializes in killing abusive men. In her part of the story, she befriends a policewoman called Ayumi, who is later murdered, then works with an old lady called "the dowager" to assassinate the leader of a cult.

Tengo, meanwhile, is tasked with re-writing a novel written by a teenage girl called Eriko Fukada. He later discovers that her magical realist novel is actually a true account of her life in a cult and that she did not write the story but rather dictated it. The novel is called Air Chrysalis and involves a race of supernatural beings called "the Little People."

Aomame and Tengo, who had known each other when they were ten years old, attempt to find one another, each believing that they are destined to fall in love. When Tengo has sex with Fukada and Aomame assassinates the cult leader, who is Fukada's father, it opens a portal through which Tengo impregnates Aomame. The two later find each other and escape into what they hope is the real version of 1984, but which appears to be another world due to subtle differences they notice. As with many other Murakami novels, the ending is ambiguous.

== Main characters ==
Aomame (青豆)

One of the three point-of-view characters of the novel, Aomame is a thirty-year-old woman working as part of an enigmatic organization for which she commits carefully selected murders. Her full name is Masami Aomame but she goes by her last name, which means "green peas". As a child, she was a member of a religious cult named "the Society of Witnesses" (modelled after Jehovah's Witnesses) and distributed religious materials with her family on weekends.

Tengo Kawana (川奈 天吾)

The second of the novel's point-of-view characters, he is an unpublished novelist who works as a math tutor at a cram school. His mother died when he was very young; his earliest memory is of his mother having her breasts sucked by a man who was not Tengo's father. His father worked for NHK going door-to-door collecting the network's reception fee, and he used to make Tengo go with him every Sunday.

Ushikawa (牛河)

A grotesquely ugly man hired by Sakigake to investigate Tengo and, later, Aomame. He becomes a point-of-view character in part three of the novel. He is tireless in his investigation, but he is not a member of Sakigake himself. He had a wife and two daughters earlier in his life, but he is now divorced and separated from them. The same character appears in another Murakami story, The Wind-Up Bird Chronicle.

Komatsu (小松)

A 45-year-old editor of a publishing company. He lives his daily life on his own schedule, seemingly oblivious to the rhythms of people around him, and often calls Tengo in the middle of the night. Although Komatsu enjoys a good professional reputation for his competence, he is not seen to be an amicable person. Little is known about his private life beyond rumors.

Fuka-Eri (ふかえり)

A slight but striking 17-year-old high-school student whose manuscript, Kūki Sanagi (空気さなぎ, "Air Chrysalis"), is entered in a literary contest. She is extremely reticent, with an unusual, abrupt way of speaking, and what seems to be an apathetic view of life. She also has dyslexia and struggles in school. Her pen name is taken from her real name, Eriko Fukada.

The Leader

He is the founder of Sakigake, and he can hear the voices of the little people. He is also the father of Fuka-Eri, and his real name is Tamotsu Fukada. He acts as a prophet for Sakigake. He has mysterious diseases, which cause him a great deal of pain and stiffness, which sometimes cause his body to become completely rigid and numb.

The Dowager (老婦人)

Her name is Shizue Ogata. She is a wealthy woman in her mid-70s. She lives in the "Willow House" in the Azabu neighborhood and has set up a safe house nearby for women who are victims of domestic violence. She meets Aomame through the sports club she attends, and she later on convinces her to take on the job of taking out targets, men who are guilty of heavy domestic abuse.

Tamaru (タマル)

A 40-year-old man who is the dowager's loyal bodyguard. He was in the toughest unit of the Japan Self-Defense Forces, where he was fed "rats and snakes and locusts". Openly gay, he lives in another part of Azabu with his younger beautician boyfriend. He has a fondness for German Shepherds and enjoys toying with machines and gadgets.

Professor Ebisuno (戎野隆之先生)

A man in his mid-60s who is Fuka-Eri's guardian. He has an apartment in Shinanomachi. He used to work in academia alongside Fuka-Eri's father before Mr. Fukada went with 30 of his students to start Sakigake.

== Publication history ==
The novel was originally published in Japan in three hardcover volumes by Shinchosha. Book 1 and Book 2 were both published on May 29, 2009; Book 3 was published on April 16, 2010.

In English translation, Knopf published the novel in the United States in a single volume hardcover edition on October 25, 2011, and released a three volume paperback box-set on May 15, 2015 (this edition numbers 1,157 pages). The cover for the hardcover edition, featuring a transparent dust jacket, was created by Chip Kidd and Maggie Hinders. In the United Kingdom the novel was published by Harvill Secker in two volumes. The first volume, containing Books 1 and 2, was published on October 18, 2011, followed by the second volume, containing Book 3, published on October 25, 2011.

== Background information ==
Murakami spent four years writing the novel after coming up with the opening sequence and title. The title is a play on the Japanese pronunciation of the year 1984 and a reference to George Orwell's Nineteen Eighty-Four. The letter Q and 九, the Japanese number for 9 (typically romanized as "kyū", but as "kew" on the book's Japanese cover), are homophones, which are often used in Japanese wordplay.

Before the publication of 1Q84, Murakami stated that he would not reveal anything about the book, following criticism that leaks had diminished the novelty of his previous books. 1Q84 was noted for heavy advance orders despite this secrecy.

== Cultural influences ==
As in many of his previous works, Murakami makes frequent reference to composers and musicians, ranging from Bach to Vivaldi and Leoš Janáček, whose Sinfonietta pops up many times at crucial points in the novel. A verse from the 1933 song "It's Only a Paper Moon" by Harold Arlen, E.Y. Harburg and Billy Rose, appears in the book and is the basis for a recurring theme throughout the work. In addition, Murakami refers to other artists such as Billie Holiday, Charles Mingus and The Rolling Stones.

The text also quotes a lengthy passage about the Gilyak people from the travel diary Sakhalin Island (1893–94) by Anton Chekhov.

The structure of the novel refers to Bach's The Well-Tempered Clavier (alternate "major key" Aomame and "minor key" Tengo story lines forming 48 chapters of Books 1 and 2) and Goldberg Variations (Book 3).

== Religious themes ==
As with many of Murakami's novels, 1Q84 is dominated by religious and sacred concepts. 1Q84's plot is built around a mystical cult and two long-lost lovers who are drawn into a distorted version of reality. 1Q84 assigns further meaning to his previous novels and draws a connection between the supernatural and the disturbing. Readers are often cited as experiencing a religious unease that is similar to postmodern sensibilities. This unease is accomplished through Murakami's creation of characters whose religious prescriptions are presented as oppressive, as exemplified in the character of Leader, who is the founder of the Sakigake cult.

Religious othering is a major theme in 1Q84, as Murakami places sacred ideas as existing separately from everyday reality. This separation is often cited as emphasizing that Murakami has a view of religion as a negative force, which lies in opposition to normal, everyday life; Murakami himself is quite silent about his personal religious beliefs.

== Critical response ==
Among the negative reviews, Time's Bryan Walsh found 1Q84 to be the weakest of Murakami's novels in part because it eschews his typical first-person narrative. A negative review from The A.V. Club had Christian Williams calling the book "stylistically clumsy" with "layers of tone-deaf dialogue, turgid description, and unyielding plot"; he awarded a D rating. Also criticizing the book was Sanjay Sipahimalani of The Indian Express, who felt the writing was too often lazy and clichéd, the Little People were risible rather than menacing, and that the book had too much repetition. Janet Maslin called the novel's "1000 uneventful pages" "stupefying" in her review for The New York Times. She had previously picked Murakami's earlier work, Kafka on the Shore, as one of the best 10 novels in 2005. William Ambler of Huffington Post panned the book for being "too absorbed in its own games to offer something so humble as resolution, and too turgid and lumbering to offer any more rarified satisfactions". Literary Review nominated the sexual encounter between Tengo and Fuka-Eri for its 2011 Bad Sex in Fiction Award. Sam Sacks criticized the dullness of Murakami's prose in the novel, calling it "banal and cliché-strewn". In his negative review on The Atlantic, Allen Barra labeled the book "2011's biggest literary letdown" and "a big disappointment after years of hype", while disapproving its excessive length.

Among the positive reviews, The Guardian's Douglas Haddow has called it "a global event in itself, [which] passionately defends the power of the novel". One review described 1Q84 as a "complex and surreal narrative" which "shifts back and forth between tales of two characters, a man and a woman, who are searching for each other". It tackles themes of murder, history, cult religion, violence, family ties and love. In another review for The Japan Times, it was said that the novel "may become a mandatory read for anyone trying to get to grips with contemporary Japanese culture", calling 1Q84 Haruki Murakami's "magnum opus". Similarly, Kevin Hartnett of The Christian Science Monitor considers it Murakami's most intricate work as well as his most ambitious and Charles Baxter of New York Review of Books praised the ambition of the novel down to the typography and attention to detail. Malcolm Jones of Newsweek considers this novel emblematic of Murakami's mastery of the novel, comparing him to Charles Dickens.

=== Awards and honors ===
The novel was longlisted for the 2011 Man Asian Literary Prize and, in November, placed No. 2 in Amazon.com's top books of the year.

It also received the 2011 Goodreads Choice Awards in the category Best Fiction.

In 2019, in a survey conducted by The Asahi Shimbun amongst 120 Japanese literary experts, 1Q84 was voted the best book published during the Heisei era (1989–2019).
