= Chin Music Press =

American book publishing company

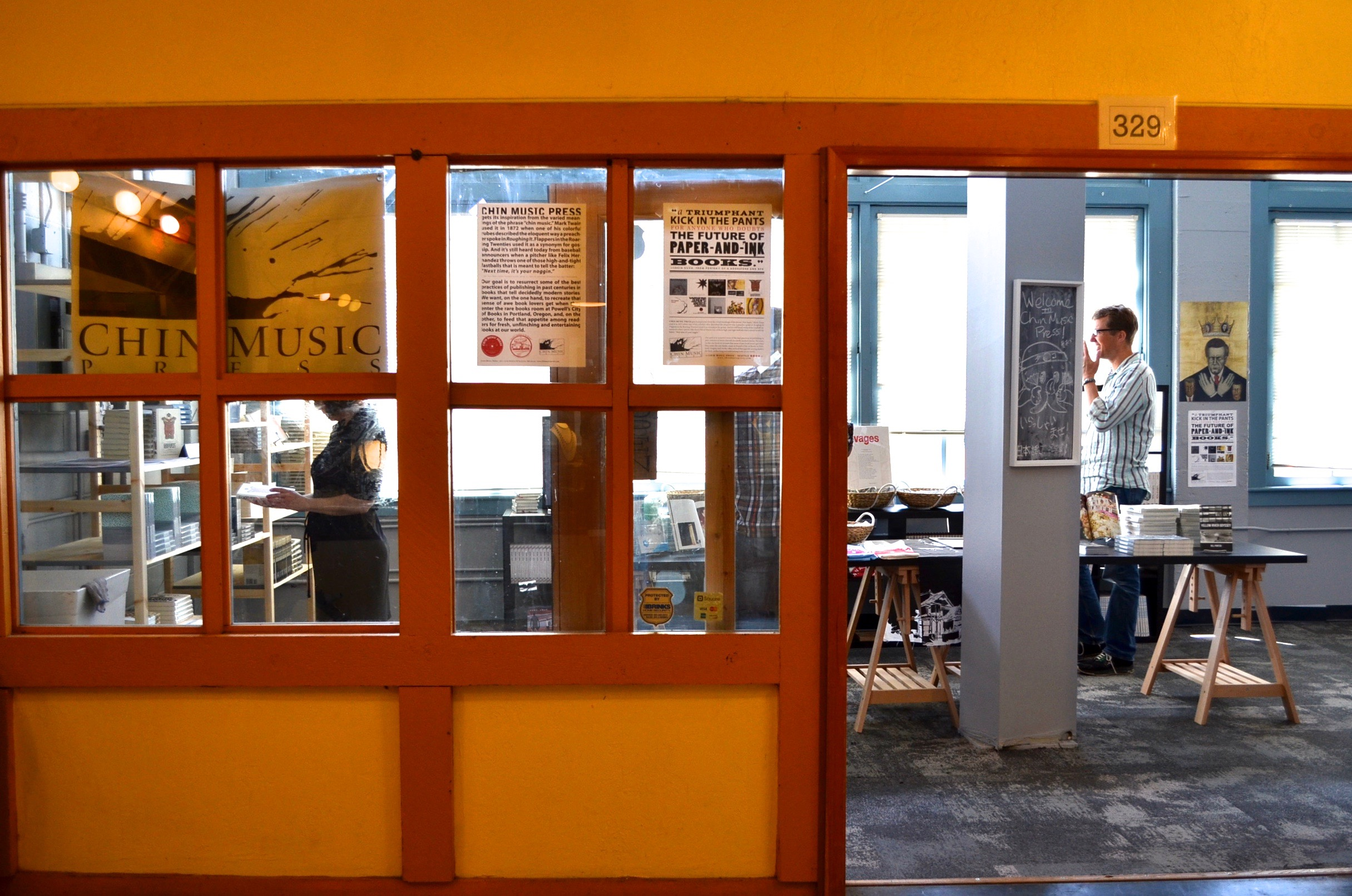
- Chin Music Press' store in the Pike Place Market.
- Founded: 2002
- Founders: Bruce Rutledge and Yuko Enomoto
- Country of origin: United States
- Headquarters location: Seattle, Washington
- Distribution: Consortium Book Sales & Distribution
- Publication types: Books
- Official website: www.chinmusicpress.com

Chin Music Press is a book publishing company known for its high-quality editions.

== History ==
The Press was founded in Seattle in 2002 by Bruce Rutledge and Yuko Enomoto. They began by publishing books on contemporary Japan, but have expanded to include books on New Orleans, China, and Korea.

After being located in various locations around Seattle for many years, in 2014 the company opened a store in Seattle's Pike Place Market.

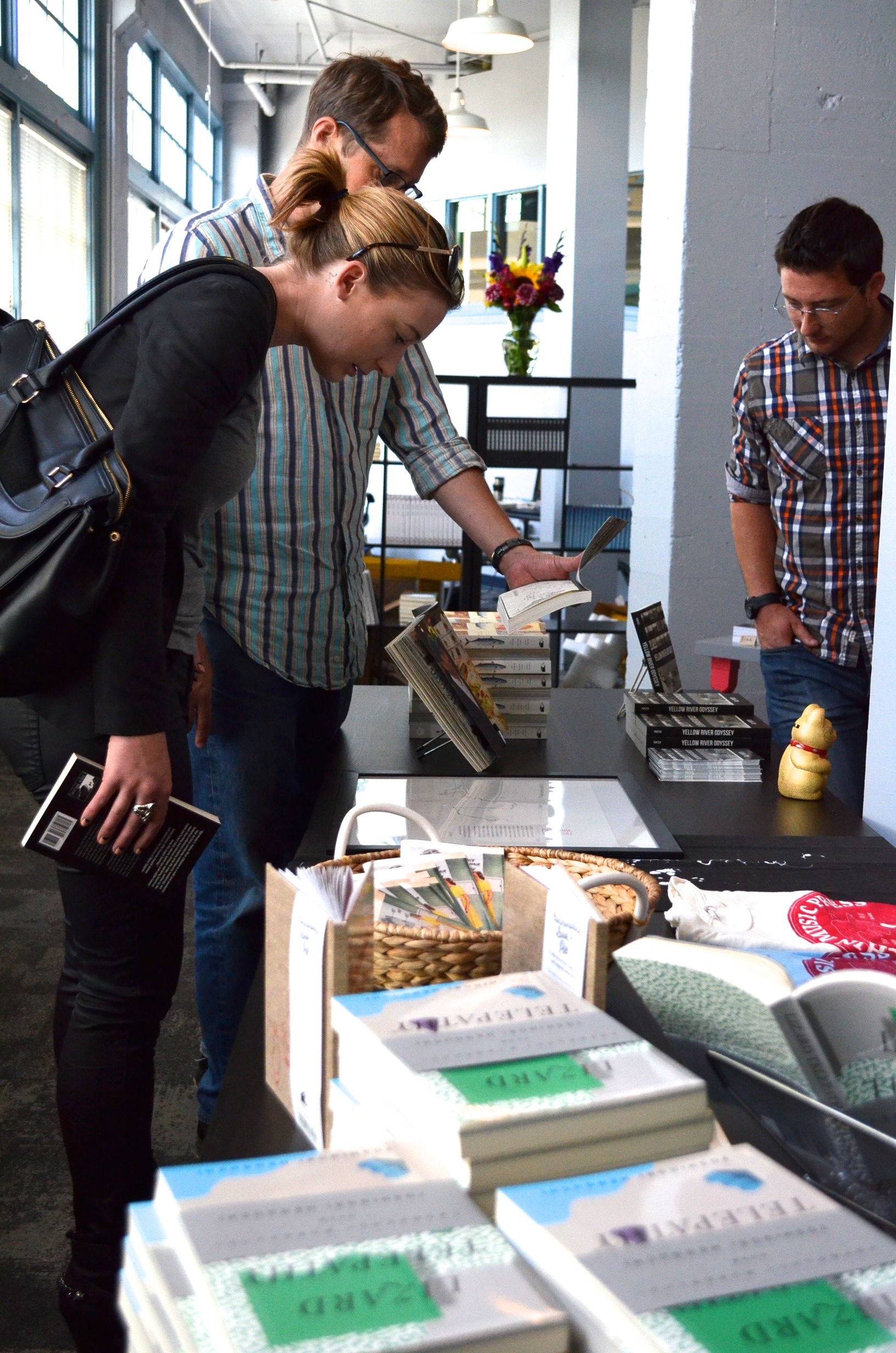
Inside the Chin Music Press location at the Pike Place market in Seattle

== Notable publications ==
- Yurei: The Japanese Ghost, by Zack Davisson
- The Sun Gods, by Jay Rubin
- Shiro: Wit, Wisdom & Recipes from a Sushi Pioneer, by Shiro Kashiba
- Are You an Echo? The Lost Poetry of Misuzu Kaneko.
