= Haruki Murakami and the Music of Words =

Non-fiction book by Jay Rubin

Haruki Murakami and the Music of Words is a non-fiction book by Jay Rubin, published by Harvill Press in 2002.

The book discusses Haruki Murakami.

The book includes some original essays written by Rubin along with some existing works by Murakami, including some entire stories and some excerpts of such. It also includes a biography of Murakami. Steffen Hantke of Sogang University described it as an "attempt to provide its readers with everything but the kitchen sink." Hantke described the book at the time as "the most comprehensive single work of scholarship on" Murakami.

It argues against the idea that Murakami's novels had little value.

Ann Sherif of Oberlin College wrote that Rubin was "frank" in his appraisals of Murakami's literature.

== Background ==
Rubin had been the most frequent person to translate Murakami's books, and also is friends with Murakami.

== Content ==
Brian Keeley of the Far Eastern Economic Review stated that the details present in the biographical information were "some significant, too many trivial".

"Translating Murakami" is in Appendix A and describes how Murakami's works are translated. The bibliography is at the end of the book and lists works in English and Japanese. Hantke stated that the bibliography "functions as a list of suggestions for further reading."

== Reception ==
Hantke stated that the book was important as a means of collecting critical information on Murakami in a single work, even though, in his view, the book covers little new information, because at the time the critical reviews of Murakami were scattered across multiple sources, and that was especially the case for information written in English.

Keeley stated that the content was "often interesting stuff", and he praised the "useful insights". He felt Rubin at times was "a little too keen, a little too gushing."

Sherif stated that the work has "much critical acumen". Sherif praised Appendix A for having "interesting insights".
