= Jay Rubin =

American translator and Japanologist (born 1941)

- Born: 1941 (age 84–85); Washington, D.C., U.S.
- Education: University of Chicago
- Occupations: Translator, scholar

Jay Rubin (born 1941) is an American translator, writer, scholar and Japanologist. He is one of the main translators of the works of the Japanese novelist Haruki Murakami into English. He has also written a guide to Japanese, Making Sense of Japanese (originally titled Gone Fishin'), and a biographical literary analysis of Murakami.

== Biography ==
Rubin was born in Washington, D.C., in 1941. Rubin has a PhD in Japanese literature from the University of Chicago. He taught at the University of Washington for eighteen years, and then moved on to Harvard University, which he left in 2008. In his early research career he focused on the Meiji state censorship system. More recently Rubin has concentrated his efforts on Murakami and Noh drama. His publications include Modern Japanese Writers (Scribners, 2001) and Haruki Murakami and the Music of Words (Harvill, 2002; Vintage, 2005). His translation of 18 stories by Ryūnosuke Akutagawa appeared as a Penguin Classics in 2006. His debut novel, The Sun Gods, was released in May 2015 (Chin Music Press) and explores the relationship between a Japanese mother, Mitsuko, and her adopted, American son, Billy, as they face American internment during World War II.

Rubin also translated the "Thousand Years of Dreams" passages by Kiyoshi Shigematsu for use in the Japanese-produced Xbox 360 game Lost Odyssey. In 2018, he edited The Penguin Book of Japanese Short Stories.

Rubin's translation of The Wind-Up Bird Chronicle by Haruki Murakami won the 2003 Noma Award for the Translation of Japanese Literature and was also awarded the Japan–U.S. Friendship Commission Prize for the Translation of Japanese Literature in 1999.

== Translations ==
- Natsume, Sōseki (1977). Sanshirō: A Novel. Translated by Rubin, Jay. Seattle: University of Washington Press. ISBN 978-0-295-95558-2.
- Natsume, Sōseki (1988). The Miner. Translated by Rubin, Jay. Stanford, California: Stanford University Press. ISBN 978-0-8047-1460-0.
- Murakami, Haruki (1993). "On Seeing the 100% Perfect Girl One Beautiful April Morning". The Elephant Vanishes. Translated by Rubin, Jay. New York: Alfred A. Knopf. ISBN 978-0-679-42057-6.
- Murakami, Haruki (1997). The Wind-Up Bird Chronicle. Translated by Rubin, Jay. New York: Alfred A. Knopf. ISBN 978-0-679-44669-9.
- Murakami, Haruki (2000). Norwegian Wood. Translated by Rubin, Jay. New York: Vintage International. ISBN 978-0-375-70402-4.
- Murakami, Haruki (2002). After the Quake. Translated by Rubin, Jay. New York: Alfred A. Knopf. ISBN 978-0-375-41390-2.
- Akutagawa, Ryūnosuke (2006). Rashōmon and Seventeen Other Stories. Translated by Rubin, Jay. London: Penguin Classics. ISBN 978-0-14-303984-6.
- Murakami, Haruki (2007). After Dark. Translated by Rubin, Jay. New York: Alfred A. Knopf. ISBN 978-0-307-26583-8.
- Murakami, Haruki (2011). 1Q84 (Book 1 April–June and Book 2 July–September). Translated by Rubin, Jay. New York: Alfred A. Knopf. ISBN 978-0-307-59331-3.
- Rubin, Jay, ed. (2019). The Penguin Book of Japanese Short Stories. Translated by various. London: Penguin Classics. ISBN 978-0-241-31190-5.
- Rubin, Jay, ed. (2024). Great Japanese Stories: 10 Parallel Texts. Translated by various. London: Penguin Classics. ISBN 978-0-241-63447-9.
- Murakami, Haruki (2024). End of the World and Hard-Boiled Wonderland: A New Translation. Everyman's Library Contemporary Classics Series. Translated by Rubin, Jay. New York: Alfred A. Knopf. ISBN 978-0-593-32002-0.

== Other works ==
as author

- Injurious to Public Morals: Writers and the Meiji State (University of Washington Press, 1984)
- Making Sense of Japanese: What the Textbooks Don't Tell You (Power Japanese Series, Kodansha's Children's Classics), Kodansha International (March 1, 2002), paperback, 144 pp., ISBN 978-4-7700-2802-0 – first published as Gone Fishin' (1992) (Note: The title, "gone fishin'", is a subjectless sentence, which is a common construction in Japanese. The title was changed because editors complained that numbers of buyers were disappointed that there was too much about Japanese grammar and nothing about "trolling for salmon", and therefore found the title misleading for a book on Japanese grammar – see preface to retitled Making Sense of Japanese for discussion.)
- The Sun Gods (Seattle, Chin Music Press, 2015) ISBN 978-1-63405-950-3

as co-editor

- with Alan Tansman and Dennis Washburn. (1997). Studies in Modern Japanese Literature: Essays and Translations in Honor of Edwin McClellan. Ann Arbor: Center for Japanese Studies, University of Michigan. ISBN 0-939512-84-X (cloth)

== See also ==
- Alfred Birnbaum – another translator of Haruki Murakami
- Philip Gabriel – another translator of Haruki Murakami
