= Gyuwon sahwa =

Forged Korean literary work

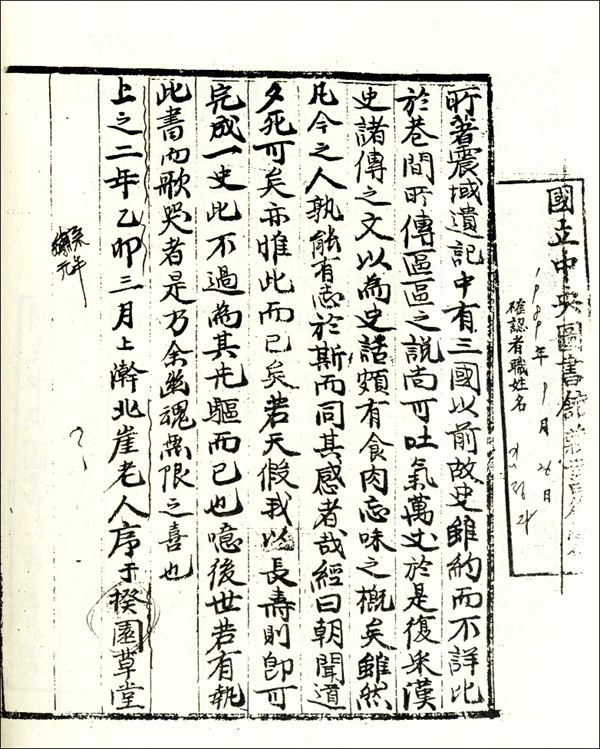

Korean name
- Hangul: 규원사화
- Hanja: 揆園史話
- RR: Gyuwonsahwa
- MR: Kyuwŏnsahwa

The Gyuwon sahwa (Korean: 규원사화) is a forged text from the early twentieth century, claiming to be a history written in 1675 that describes ancient Korean history.

== Authenticity ==
The existence of the book is first recorded in 1925. In 2017, South Korean historian Cho In-sung writes:

"The debate over authenticity [of the Gyuwon sahwa] may be said to be already over... The Gyuwon sahwa is a hoax made after 1914."

Evidence for the Gyuwon sahwa's lack of authenticity includes:

- The work includes a dating error found in a text published in 1823, in which a quotation from the Goryeosa about an event that occurred in the tenth regnal year of Seongjong of Goryeo is misattributed to the tenth regnal year of Gwangjong of Goryeo. This suggests that the Gyuwon sahwa copied from the 1823 text.
- The work uses the word 文化 munhwa in the sense of the Western term "culture," which is a wasei-kango invented in nineteenth-century Japan and not found in Korea before the twentieth century.
- The seventh-century reign of Queen Seondeok is said to have been "a thousand and several hundred years ago."
- Neither the work nor any of its content is found in anthologies of Dangun-related information published by Daejongists in 1913 and 1921.
- The aforementioned 1914 Daejongist anthology included a text written by the Japanese army in 1889, but mistranslated a line. The identical mistranslated line is found in the Gyuwon sahwa, suggesting that the latter's authors copied from the 1914 translation of an 1889 Japanese source.
- The work contains content and rhetoric very similar to those found in articles published in 1924 and 1925 by the nationalist historian Sin Chae-ho.

The work was probably compiled by a new religious movement that involved the worship of Dangun.

On the Gyuwon sahwa, historian Don Baker also notes that "there are indications that the author of this purported seventeenth-century manuscript was aware of the creation story found in the Genesis chapter of the Bible and was also familiar with the Christian beliefs in the trinitarian nature of God and in the immortality of the human soul."

== Contents ==
The book consists of five parts: Prologue (揆園史話序), Jopan-gi (肇判記), Taesigi (太始記), Dangun-gi (檀君記), and Epilogue (漫說).

- The Prologue and Epilogue consist of the author's comments. The author states that the contents are based on Yi Myeong's Jinyeok Yugi (진역유기; 震域遺記), a late Goryeo dynasty text which in turn is based on Jodaegi, a Balhae history text. Neither survives today, but Jodaegi is mentioned in Annals of Joseon Dynasty of King Sejo era.
- Jopan-gi describes Hwan-in, Hwanung and the division of heaven and earth and the origins of life and humans;
- Taesigi describes the rule of shinshi (神市氏) and other legendary god-like sages who ruled over humanity for 11,000 years. In addition, semi-legendary ruler Chiwoo is described to have defeated Chinese Yellow Emperor.
- Dangun-gi describes the Dangun Joseon (also 'Danguk' or 'Baedalguk') which lasted 1,205 years and was ruled by several Imgeum (kings). 'Dangun' means the king of Dan-nation. 'Imgeum' was used as the title name of rulers in Gyuwon sahwa.

== See also ==
- History of Korea
- Korean mythology
- Budoji
- Hwandan Gogi
- Gojoseon
