= Hwan-guk =

Mythical Korean state

Hwanguk (Korean: 환국; Hanja: 桓國) is the first mythical state of Korea claimed to have existed according to Hwandan Gogi. According to Hwandan Gogi, Hwanguk existed long before Gojoseon. However, mainstream Korean historians reject the existence of Hwanguk for lack of credible evidence.

== Historical claims ==
In some editions of Samguk Yusa, one of the oldest surviving Korean history books, the name Hwanin (桓因), the mythical grandfather of Gojoseon's founder Dangun, is written in different characters such as 囯 or 𡆮 (a character with 士 written inside 囗) to represent the character 因. In the original footnotes for the book, Il-yeon clarifies the meaning of the 桓因 as Jeseok (帝釋, Korean Buddhist name for Indra). However, the characters were similar to a simplified form for the character 國 meaning "nation", which led to future claims.

=== Pre-modern claims ===
17th-century Korean scholar Nam Gu-man and 18th-century Korean scholar Lee Jong-hwi misquoted the characters as 國 while citing Samguk Yusa. Since it was grammatically dubious to quote this way, the sentence was rephrased in the meaning of "There was Indra of Hwanguk." However, these misreadings were not common thanks to the footnotes, as evidenced by the quotes from other literature such as the Veritable Records of the Joseon Dynasty,

=== Claims during the Japanese occupation ===
In 1918, Korean historian Choe Nam-seon claimed Hwanguk means "heaven" and is the abode of the Hwan people, which he reflected in his 1927 translation of Samguk Yusa (Choe later changed his opinion in 1954).

In the 1921 edition of Samguk Yusa published by Kyoto University, an act of correction was conducted to clarify the character as 因, which brought backlash from Korean nationalists leading to the adoption of the misquote as a mainstream interpretation among Korean historians in the early 20th century.

The followers of Daejongism rejected the interpretation fearing the contradiction with its religious beliefs.

=== Claims after liberation ===
Mainstream historians disregarded the claim after the liberation of Korea in 1945.

In 1966 Korean pseudohistorian Moon Jeong Chang claimed in his work Dangunjoseonsagiyeongu ("Research of Historic Records of Dangun Joseon") that the Japanese authorities tried to suppress the truth of Hwanguk by forging historic documents, led by Japanese historian of Korea Imanishi Ryu (今西龍). This book influenced a lot of pseudohistorians in Korea.

== See also ==
- Founding myth of Korea
- Budoji
- Hwandan-gogi
