= Hwandan Gogi =

Korean historical text believed to be fake

Hwandan Gogi (Korean: 환단고기; Hanja: 桓檀古記), also called Handan Gogi in some published copies, is a pseudohistorical compilation of texts on ancient Korean history. It is a bound volume of four supposedly historical records.

According to its introduction, the text was compiled in 1911 by Gye Yeon-su (계연수, 桂延壽; said to be died 1920) and supervised by Yi Gi (이기, 李沂; 1848–1909). The entire set of texts, of which the only extant version is a modern transcription by Yi Yu-rip published in 1979, is widely regarded as a forgery among academics.

== Contents ==
The Hwandan Gogi comprises the following four books:

- Samseonggi, a two-volume book which describes an ancient kingdom called Hwan-guk that lasted for 3301 years and Hwanung's 1565-year rule of Baedalguk (倍達國).
- Dangun Segi (단군세기; 檀君世紀), a chronicle of Gojoseon through 47 generations of Dangun rulers.
- Bukbuyeogi, a book about the six kings of Bukbuyeo (North Buyeo).
- Taebaek Ilsa, a book about the histories of Hwan-guk, Baedalguk, Samjoseon, Goguryeo, Balhae, and Goryeo; also includes the text of Cheonbu-gyeong.

== Dispute regarding authenticity ==
=== Support ===
Some historians view the Hwandan Gogi as worthy of further scholarly scrutiny, believing that it is at least partly based on historically valuable, ancient (if not literally accurate) texts.

- The astronomical record alleging five stars had been arranged in a straight line in 1733 BCE (오성취루; 五星聚婁) was confirmed by Professor Park Changbeom, who published his findings in a journal. He showed that the five stars would have been arranged in straight line in 1734 BCE, under the assumption that Gojoseon had been established in 2333 BCE.
- Law professor Junhwan Go offered several reasons as to why he found Hwandan Gogi worthy of consideration.
- The territory of Gojoseon described in Hwandan Gogi corresponds to the distribution area of the mandolin-shaped dagger culture in Korea. The distribution area of mandolin shaped daggers are advocated by Yoon et al. and Yi Pyong-do.

=== Criticism ===
Most historians in South Korea, North Korea and Japan consider the text to have been created in recent times due to the following reasons:

- The document contains modern phrases and concepts. For example, it includes references to gender equality (男女平權, 'men's and women's rights') and patriarchy (父權, 'father's rights').
- The manner in which Hwandan Gogi was first published is unclear:
  - There are no historical records which support the existence of Samseonggi's two alleged authors, An Ham-ro and Won Dong-jung. It is believed that a group of three people by the name of An Ham, Ro Won, and Dong Jung were mistaken as two individuals.
  - Yi Gi could not have supervised the compilation of Hwandan Gogi in 1911, as he had already died in 1909.
  - The contents of Cheonbu-gyeong could not have been included in Taebaek Ilsa before 1911, because the Cheonbu-gyeong was first discovered and known to the Daejonggyo in 1916.
  - Gye Yeon-su, the person who is said to have compiled the Hwandan Gogi, may not have existed. No reliable historical records support his existence.
  - The 1911 first edition of the Hwandan Gogi (or any edition published before 1979) has never been found. Yi Yu-rip claimed that the 1911 edition was burned during the Korean War or had been lost by flood, and asserted he had "restored the Hwandan Gogi through memory."

Other criticisms targeted unrealistic descriptions found in the texts, for example:

- When calculated with modern measures, the alleged territory of Hwan-guk spans from the North Pole to the South Pole.
- The rulers of Baedalguk are said to have lived for an average of 120–150 years.
- Hwan-guk is said to have had intricate bureaucratic systems during the Stone Age.
- Some records in Hwandan Gogi contradict each other.

== See also ==
- Gyuwon Sahwa
