= Dan-Gun (teul) =

Second ITF Taekwon-Do pattern

2. Dan-Gun
단군
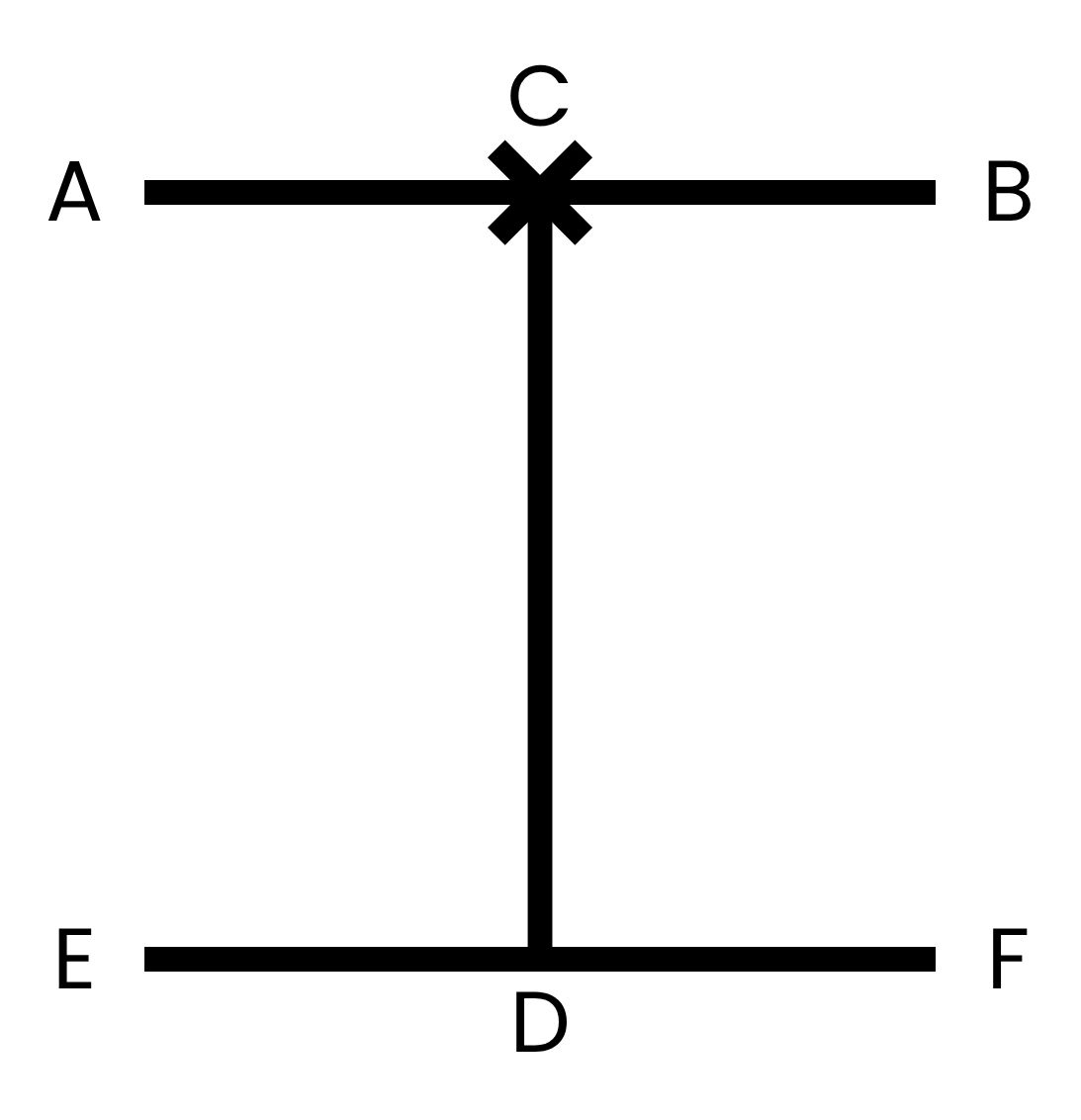
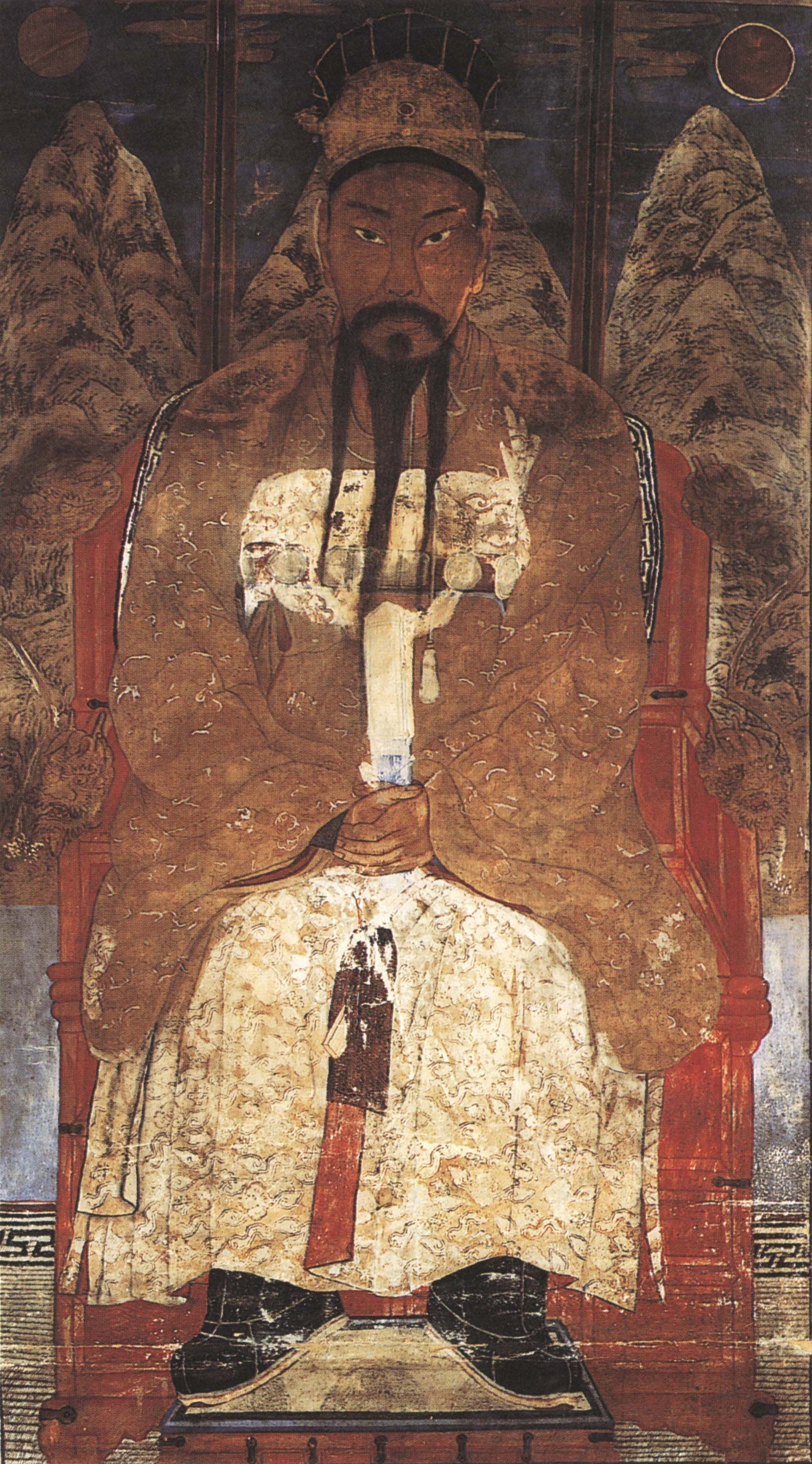
- Diagram of Dan-Gun Dangun
- Movements: 21
- Begin stance: Parallel ready stance A
- Return foot: Left
- Meaning: Tan'gun
- Associated geup: 8th

Dan-Gun (Korean: 단군; RR: Dangun, Korean pronunciation: [tan.kun]) is the second Taekwon-Do teul, as defined by the International Taekwon-Do Federation. The pattern consists of 21 movements and is taught to students with the 8th geup (yellow belt) and necessary to know to obtain the 7th geup (yellow-green belt).

== Meaning ==
The pattern's name refers to Dangun, the legendary founder and first king of Gojoseon, the first Korean kingdom. He is believed to have founded Gojoseon in 2333 BC.

=== Myth ===
In Korean mythology, Dangun's ancestry legend begins with his grandfather Haneunim, the "Lord of Heaven". Haneunim had a son, Hwanung, who yearned to live on the earth among the valleys and the mountains. Haneunim permitted Hwanung and 3,000 followers to descend onto Taebaeksan (now believed to be Mount Paektu).

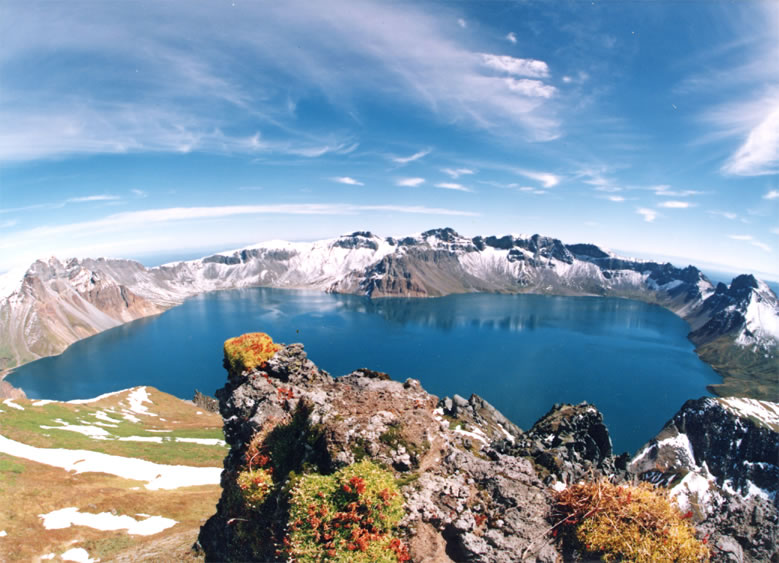
Mount Paektu

A tiger and a bear prayed to Hwanung that they might become human. Upon hearing their prayers, Hwanung gave them twenty cloves of garlic and a bundle of mugwort, ordering them to eat only this sacred food and remain out of the sunlight for 21 days. The tiger gave up soon and left the cave. However, the bear persevered and was transformed into a woman. The bear and the tiger are said to represent two tribes that sought the favor of the heavenly prince.

The bear-woman, Ungnyeo, was grateful and made offerings to Hwanung, who later got a child who they would name Dangun Wanggeom. Dangun ascended to the throne, built the walled city of Asadal, and called the kingdom Joseon (referred to today as Gojoseon so as not to be confused with the later kingdom of Joseon).

=== Number of movements ===
The 21 movements in Dan-Gun refer to the 21 days that the tiger and the bear had to remain in the cave in order to become human.

== Movements ==
Nr.	English description	Korean description (in Hangul)	Korean description (in Revised Romanisation)
	Parallel ready stance A facing D	나란히준비서기	narani junbi seogi
1	Move the left foot to B, forming a right L stance toward B, at the same time executing a middle-guarding block to B, with a knifehand.	ㄴ자서손칼대비막기	nieunja seo sonkal daebi makgi
2	Move the right foot to B forming a right walking stance toward B while executing a high punch to B with the right fist.	걷는서높은데앞지르기	geonneun seo nopeunde ap jireugi
3	Move the right foot to A, forming a left L stance toward A, at the same time executing a middle guarding block to A, with a knifehand.	ㄴ자서손칼대비막기	nieunja seo sonkal daebi makgi
4	Move the left foot to A forming a left walking stance toward A while executing a high punch to A with the left fist.	걷는서높은데앞지르기	geonneun seo nopeunde ap jireugi
5	Move the left foot to D, forming a left walking stance toward D while executing a low block to D with the left forearm.	걷는서팔목낮은데막기	geonneun seo palmok najunde makgi
6	Move the right foot to D, forming a right walking stance toward D while executing a high punch to D with the right fist.	걷는서높은데앞지르기	geonneun seo nopeunde ap jireugi
7	Move the left foot to D, forming a left walking stance toward D while executing a high punch to D with the left fist.	걷는서높은데앞지르기	geonneun seo nopeunde ap jireugi
8	Move the right foot to D, forming a right walking stance toward D while executing a high punch to D with the right fist.	걷는서높은데앞지르기	geonneun seo nopeunde ap jireugi
9	Move the left foot to E, turning anti-clockwise to form a right L stance towards E while executing a twin forearm block to E.	ㄴ자서쌍팔목막기	nieunja seo ssang palmok makgi
10	Move the right foot to E, forming a right walking stance toward E while executing a high punch to E with the right fist.	걷는서높은데앞지르기	geonneun seo nopeunde ap jireugi
11	Move the right foot to F, turning clockwise to form a left L stance towards F while executing a twin forearm block to F.	ㄴ자서쌍팔목막기	nieunja seo ssang palmok makgi
12	Move the left foot to F, forming a left walking stance toward F while executing a high punch to F with the left fist.	걷는서높은데앞지르기	geonneun seo nopeunde ap jireugi
13	Move the left foot to C, forming a left walking stance toward C while executing a low block to C with the left forearm.	걷는서팔목낮은데막기	geonneun seo palmok najunde makgi
14	Execute a rising block with the left forearm, maintaining the left walking stance toward C, connected with movement 13 in continuous motion.	걷는서추켜막기, 계속동작	geonneun seo chukyeo makgi, gyesok dongjak
15	Move the right foot to C, forming a right walking stance toward C while executing a rising block with the right forearm.	걷는서추켜막기	geonneun seo chukyeo makgi
16	Move the left foot to C, forming a left walking stance toward C while executing a rising block with the left forearm.	걷는서추켜막기	geonneun seo chukyeo makgi
17	Move the right foot to C, forming a right walking stance toward C while executing a rising block with the right forearm.	걷는서추켜막기	geonneun seo chukyeo makgi
18	Move the left foot to B, turning anti-clockwise to form a right L stance towards B while executing a middle outward strike to B with the left knifehand.	ㄴ자서손칼옆때리기	nieunja seo sonkal yeop ttaerigi
19	Move the right foot to B, forming a right walking stance toward B while executing a high punch to B with the right fist.	걷는서높은데앞지르기	geonneun seo nopeunde ap jireugi
20	Move the right foot to A, turning clockwise to form a left L stance towards A while executing a middle outward strike to A with the right knifehand.	ㄴ자서손칼옆때리기	nieunja seo sonkal yeop ttaerigi
21	Move the left foot to A, forming a left walking stance toward A while executing a high punch to A with the right fist.	걷는서높은데앞지르기	geonneun seo nopeunde ap jireugi
	Move the left foot to parallel ready stance A facing D.	나란히준비서기	narani junbi seogi

== Trivia ==
- Dan-Gun is the only teul in which all punches are high. This refers Dangun climbing a mountain in a Korean myth.
- Dan Gun is the only teul that refers to the Gojoseon era.
