= Dangun calendar =

Official calendar of South Korea from 1948 to 1961

Today (at UTC+00)
- Thursday, 29 October 2026
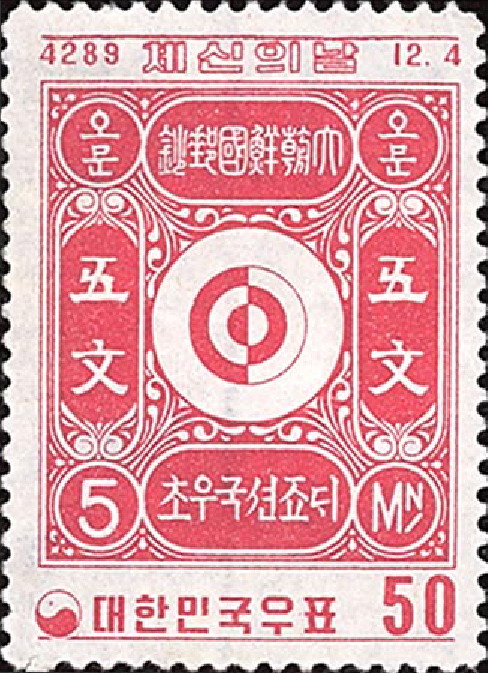
- A South Korean postage stamp from 1956. Note the year 4289 in the upper left corner.
- Korean: 19 Gaedal, 4359 DE
Other calendars
Akan	Kuruyaw
Armenian	11 Trē 1476
Aztec	Atlcahualo 7, 7 Xōchitl
Babylonian	16 Tashritu, 2337 SE
Balinese pawukon	Menga, Pasah, Laba, Wage, Paniron, Wraspati of Watugunung, Brahma, Urungan, Suka
Bengali	13 Kartik, BS 1433
Chinese	Yang Fire Rat・Legs Mansion; Fire Horse Year, Month 9, Day 20 (Shuangjiang, 9 days until Lidong)
Common Era	29 October 2026 CE
Coptic	19 Paopi, AM 1743
Egyptian	16 Phamenoth, 2775 NE
Ethiopian	19 Ṭeqemt, 2019 Amätä Məhrät
French Republican	Décade I, Septidi de Brumaire de l'Année 235 de la République
Gregorian	29 October, AD 2026
Hebrew	18 Cheshvan, AM 5787
Hindu	Rohiṇi・Varīyas; Solar: 12 Kārtika, 1948 SE; Lunisolar: Caturthī, Kṛishna pakṣa of Āśvina, 2083 VE; Rāudra・5127 KY・1,872,877
Icelandic	Fimmtudagur, 6 Gormánuður 2026
Islamic	17 Jumada al-awwal, AH 1448 (using tabular method)
ISO week date	2026-W44-4
Japanese	19 Nagatsuki, Reiwa 8 (Sōkō, 9 days until Rittō)
Julian	16 October, AD 2026 (AM 7535)
Julian day	2461343
Maya	13.0.14.1.0; 13 Zac, 7 Ahau
Roman	ante diem XVII Kalendas Novembres, MMDCCLXXIX AUC
Solar Hijri	7 Aban, SH 1405
Tibetan	19 tha skar, me pho rta 2153 or 1772 or 1000

The Dangun calendar (Korean: 단군기원; Hanja: 檀君紀元) is a Korean calendar system whose epoch is set as the year 2333 BC, the legendary year of the founding of Gojoseon by Dangun Wanggeom. It was the official calendar system of South Korea from 1948 to 1961.

Dates are calculated from Korea's meridian (135th meridian east in modern time for South Korea), and observances and festivals are based on Korean culture.

== History ==
The ancient East Asian state of Gojoseon is widely considered the first state of the Korean nation. The founding myth of Gojoseon, as recounted by Il-yeon's 13th-century text Samguk Yusa, denotes that the kingdom was founded by the mythical deity Dangun fifty years after the enthronement of the legendary Chinese Emperor Yao, on the year of gyeongin (2311 BC). On a separate note, however, Il-yeon added that he believed the actual date of foundation was on the year of jeongsa (2284 BC). Alternatively, citing Sima Guang's Zizhi Tongjian and Yi Sŭnghyu's Chewang un'gi, the Tongguk t'onggam argues that the year of Gojoseon's foundation was the year of mujin (2333 BC), only twenty-five years after the rise of Emperor Yao.

On a petition to King Gongmin, Paek Munbo, a civil servant of Goryeo, advised the King to expand the studies of Confucianism further, arguing that, as a heavenly cycle of 3600 years had passed since the founding of Gojoseon, a new anniversary of opportunities would be bestowed upon the kingdom.

The Dangun calendar was later adopted by followers of Daejongism, a new religious movement founded in 1909 that centered on the worship of figures of Korean mythology. It became the official calendar of the Republic of Korea on September 25, 1948, under the Reign-Title Act (연호에 관한 법률). The Gregorian calendar was adopted as the official calendar of South Korea in December 1961, effectively replacing the Dangun calendar from January 1, 1962.
