= Samseonggung =

Korean shamanic shrine in South Gyeongsang, South Korea

Coordinates: 35.241203°N 127.701618°E

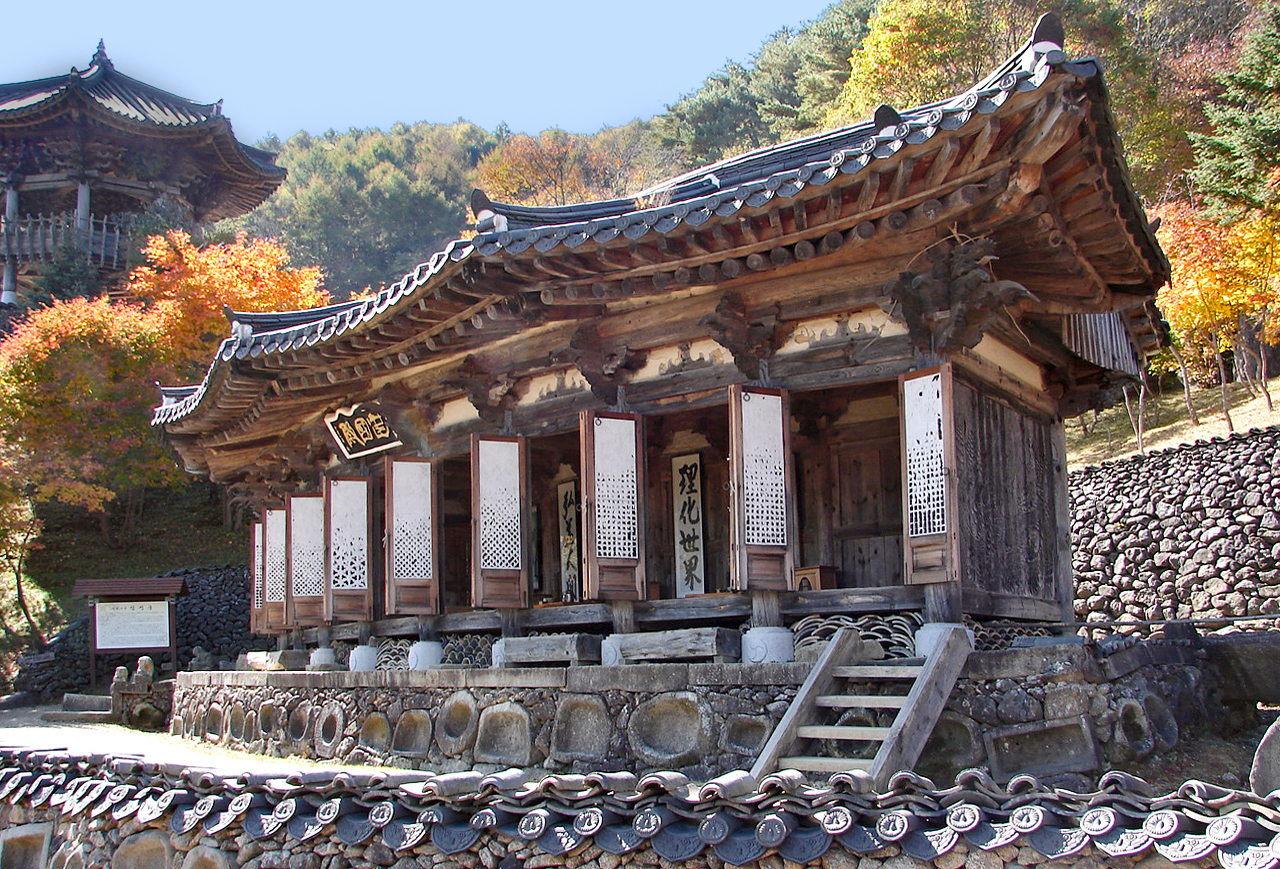
- Cheongung, or the main Shrine Hall of the Three Sages at Samseonggung.

Korean name
- Hangul: 삼성궁
- Hanja: 三聖宮
- RR: Samseonggung
- MR: Samsŏnggung

Samseonggung ("Palace of the Three Sages") is a Korean shamanic shrine along the slopes of Jiri Mountain, Hadong County in South Gyeongsang Province that was created for paying homage to the three mythical founders (father-son-grandson trio) of Korea:

- Hwanin (환인) - or "Divine Regent" is, in the traditional Dangun mythology, portrayed as the Emperor of Heaven himself.
- Hwanung (환웅) - or "Supreme Divine Regent" is Hwanin's son, who, in the traditional Dangun mythology, descended to the peak of a sacred mountain long ago to bring civilized government and thus benefitted humanity.
- Dangun (단군) - or "Grandson of Heaven" is the divine son of Hwanung. Dangun was the fabled founder of Gojoseon, the first Korean kingdom, around present-day Liaoning, Northeast China and the Korean Peninsula. Dangun is said to have founded the kingdom in 2333 BCE.

== Origin ==
Samseonggung shrine was established in 1983 by Ham Pil, a Taoist priest claiming his family based Taoist lineage occupied this part of Jiri Mountain for the last 400 years. Additional construction and updating is ongoing.

Samseonggung was constructed on this site based in the spirit of Hongik Ingan (Korean: 홍익인간; Hanja: 洪益人間; lit. ''widely benefit all mankind'') and Euihwa Segye (Korean: 의화세계; Hanja: 義和世界; lit. ''rightfully harmonize all the world'') to continue the Baedal people's ideology of Seon and the lifestyle of Shinseondo (the way of Seon). The teachings include Chung (충/ Hanja: 忠, "loyalty"), Hyo (효/ Hanja: 孝, "filial piety"), Shin (신/ Hanja: 信, "faith"), Yong (용/ Hanja: 勇, "bravery or courage"), and In (인/ Hanja: 仁, "humane virtue"), these concepts are from Chinese Confucianism. Also, teaching of the "Six Skills" of reading, archery, horse riding, propriety, Gwonbak (hand striking), and music and song.

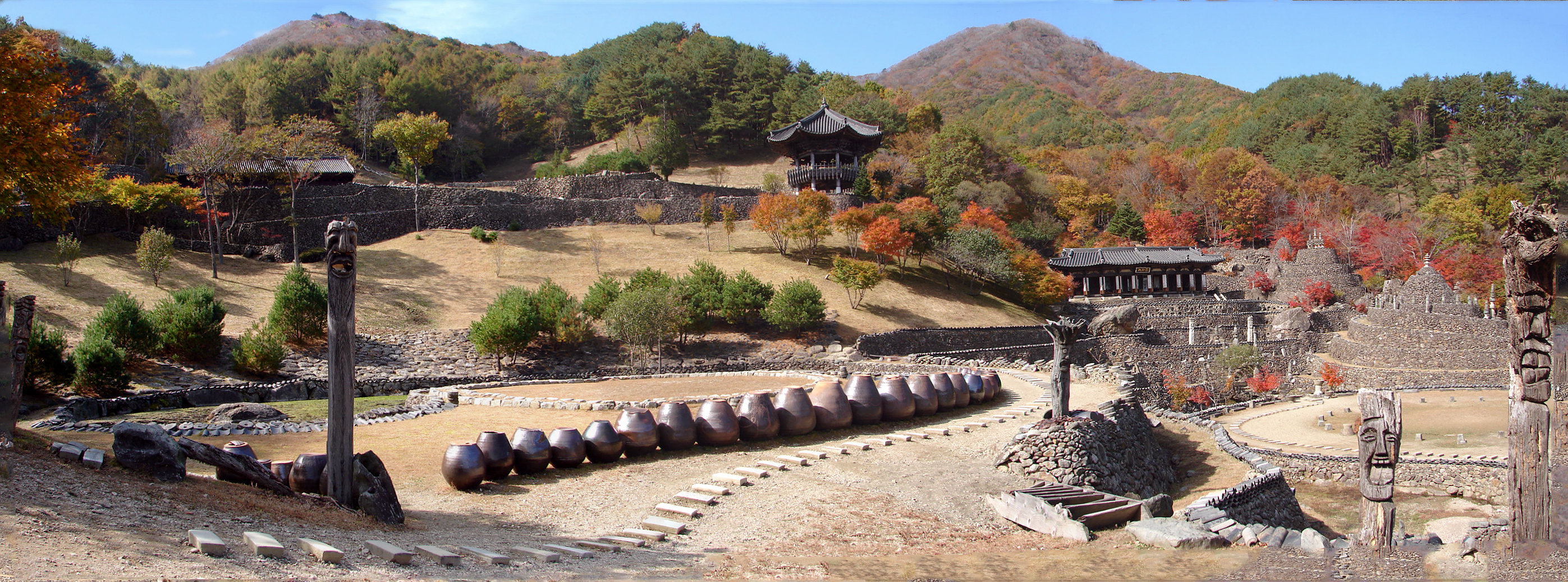

== Characteristics ==
Available at the entrance to Samseonggung is a museum and gift shop offering a variety visitor amenities. The pathway up to the main shrine grounds meanders through the hillside past an interesting mix of sights and shrines.

At the end of the path one encounters the closed gate to the main shrine grounds. Access is gained by striking the gong, secured to a wooden post located just outside the gated entrance, three times. A monk shortly appears and gives a brief lecture about Samseonggung, explaining the various rules for visiting, including instructions on how to bow to the three founders. Once inside, one of the visitors in the group may be asked to don traditional clothes.

Erected to ward off evil spirits, there are many stone and wood poles called Jangseung (장승, like totem poles) and Bangsadap (방사답/ Hanja: 防邪塔, "Guardian Mounds", i.e. mound which repels or wards evil) - sometimes called doldap (돌답), conical stone pyramids throughout the grounds. Visitors can walk pathways around the grounds to see the many totems and the approximately 1,500 stone pyramids, found throughout the grounds of Samseonggung.

=== Main Shrine Hall ===
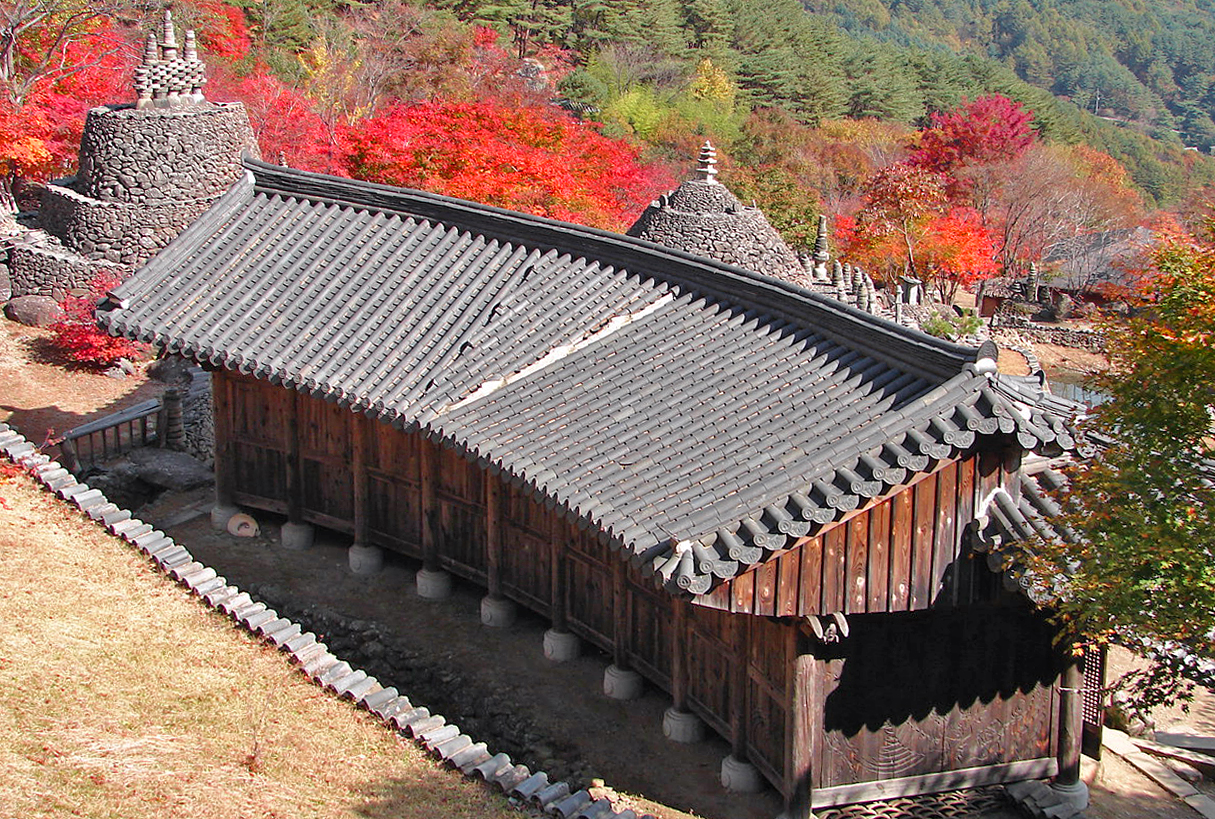
Curved back of Cheongung

Cheongung (천궁/ Hanja: 天宮, "Heavenly Celestial Palace"), or the main Shrine Hall of the Three Sages, enshrines paintings and altars for the honoring of the three mythical founders of Korea. Hwanin - is in the center, Hwanung - is on the left, and Dangun - is on the right inside the hall. The architecture of the hall is unique in itself being constructed in the shape of an arc with front of the hall the greater of the radii.

=== Jade Comma Pond ===
An interesting feature is the Jade Comma Pond, a jade colored pond in the shape of a comma, or "half a Yin and Yang", located next to the performance area.

== Cheonje festival ==
The Cheonje festival (천제절/ Hanja: 天祭節, "Heavenly Ritual" or "Ceremony for Heaven"), is held on the main shrine grounds yearly. The festival, having been held by Koreans throughout their history of more than 2000 years, is described as "colorful events filled with joy, friendship, drink and dance". The Samseonggung Cheonje Festival is held on the third day of the tenth moon of the Lunar Calendar.

== Gallery ==
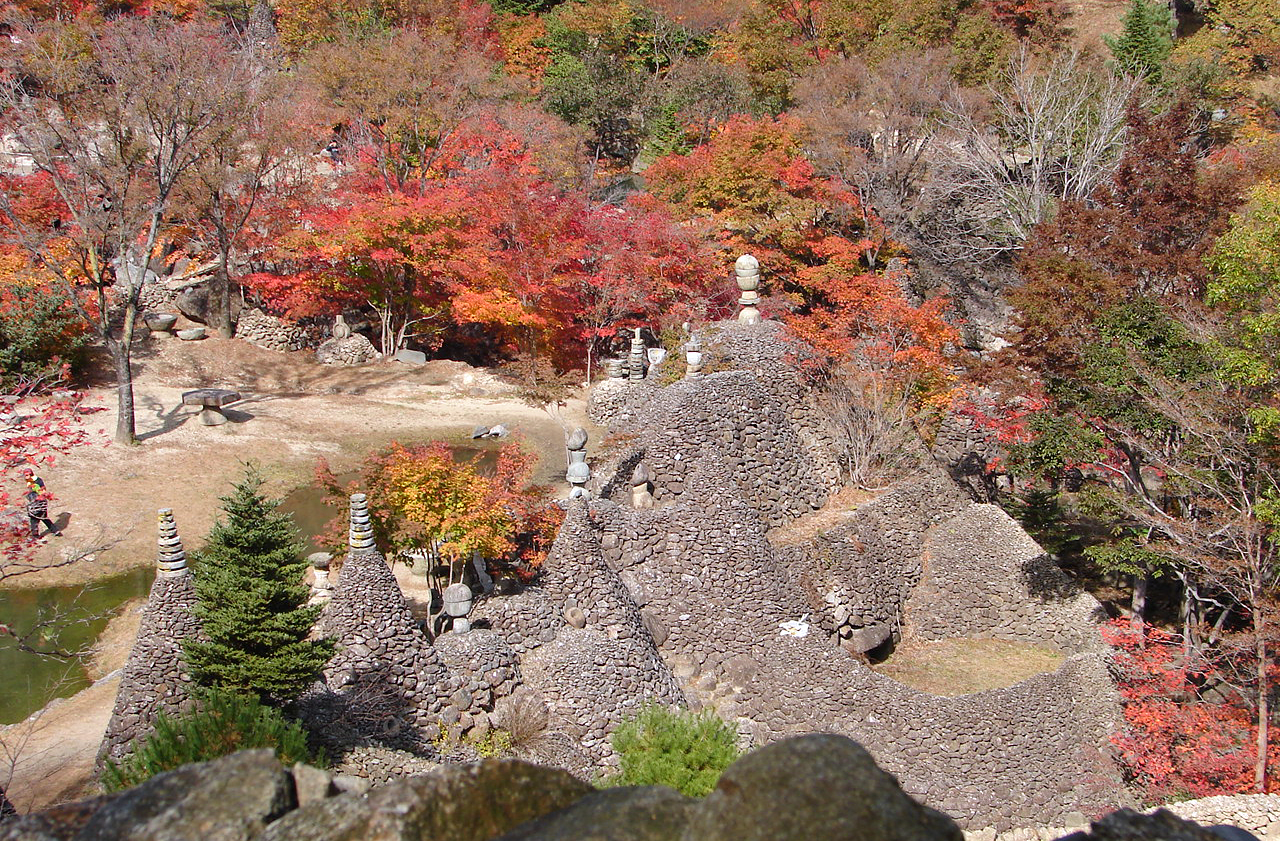
Some of the Bangsadap

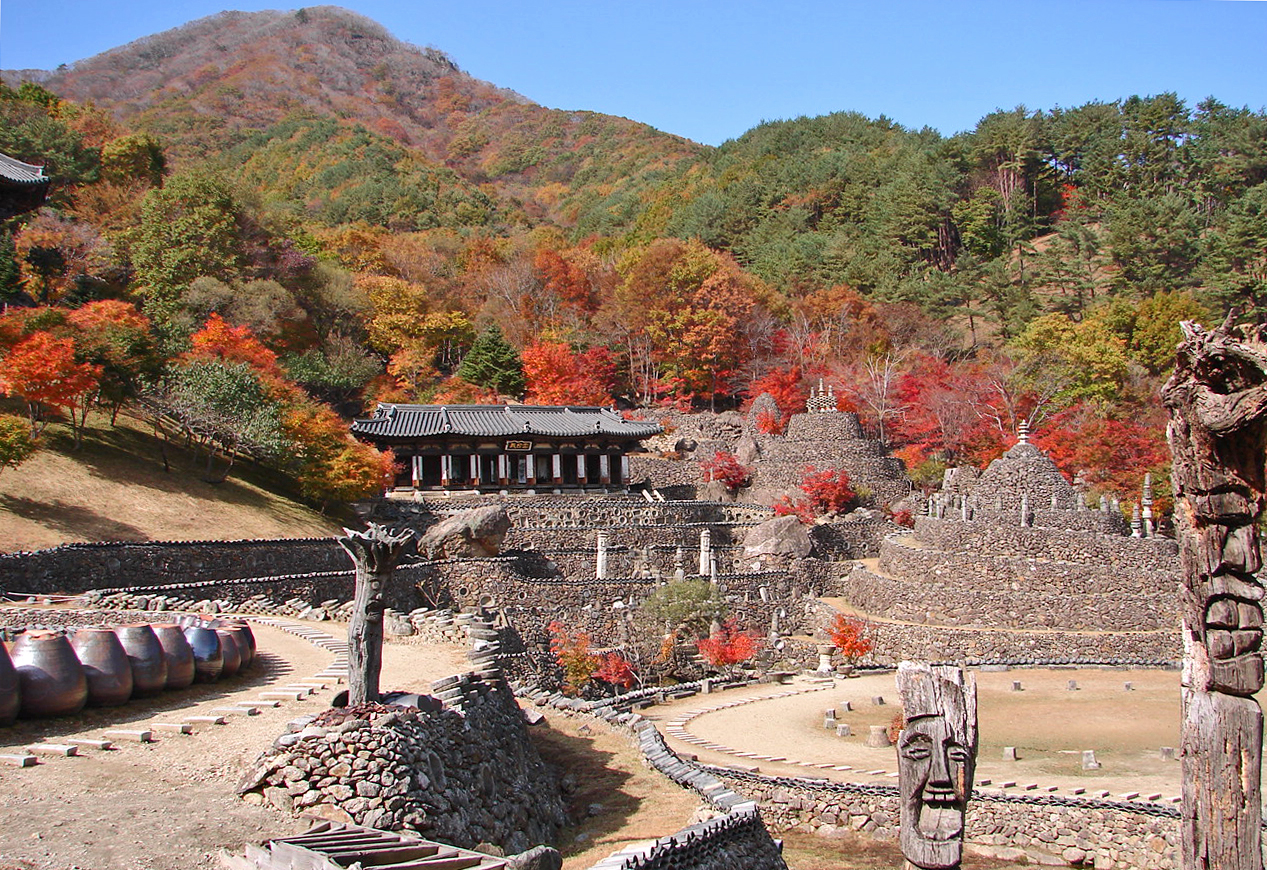
Cheongung and Bangsadap

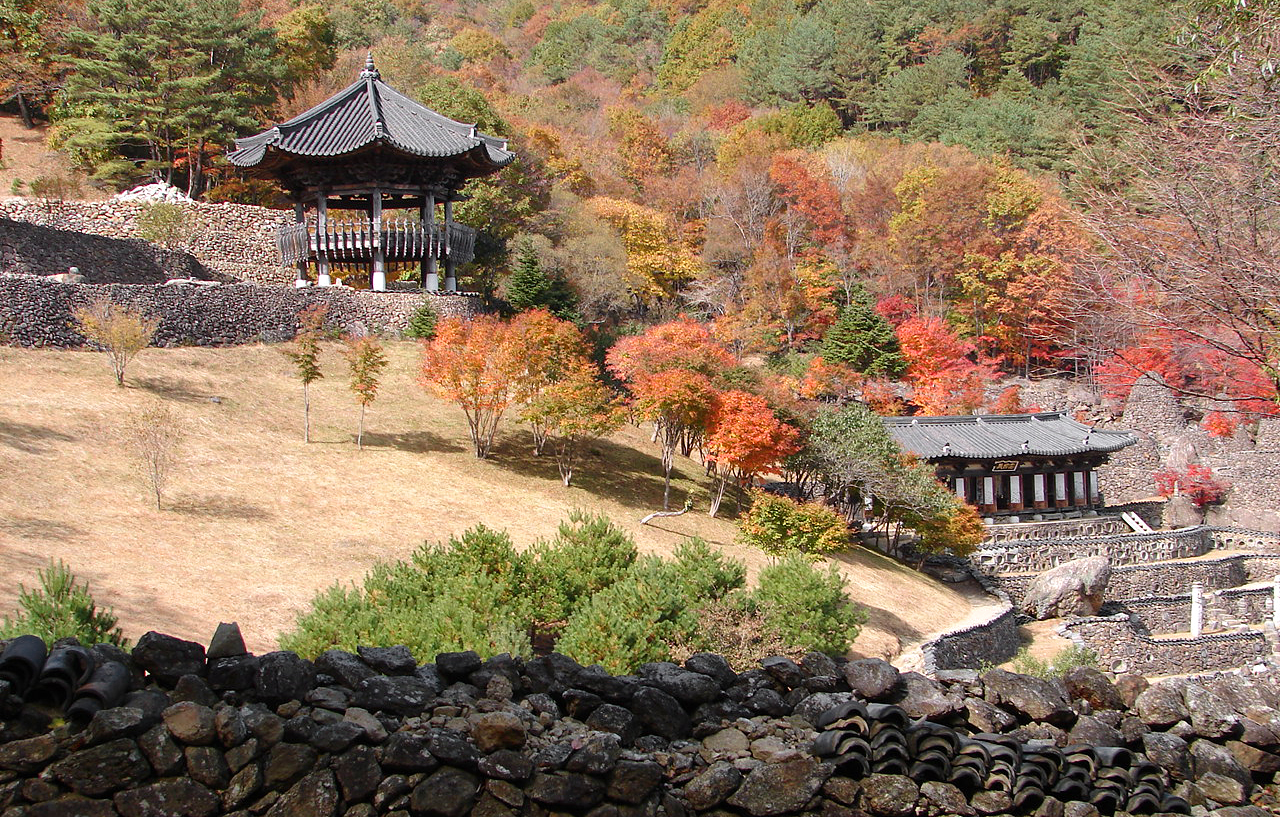
Pavilion and Cheongung

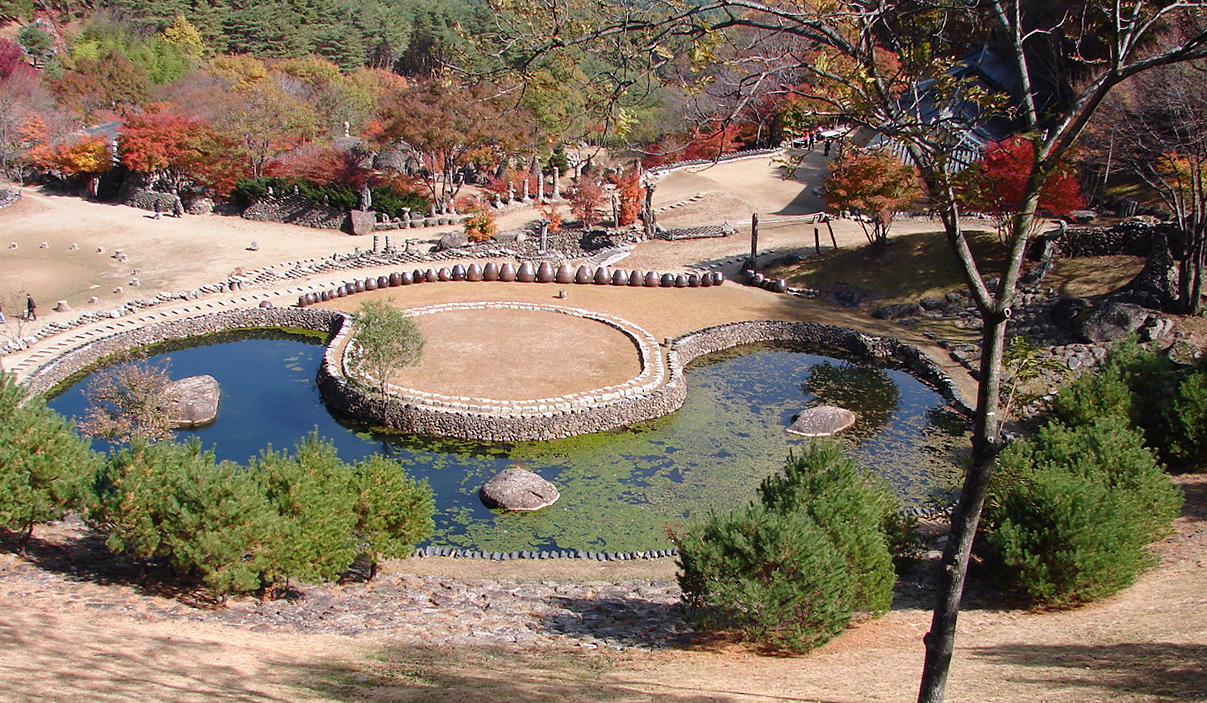
Jade Pond

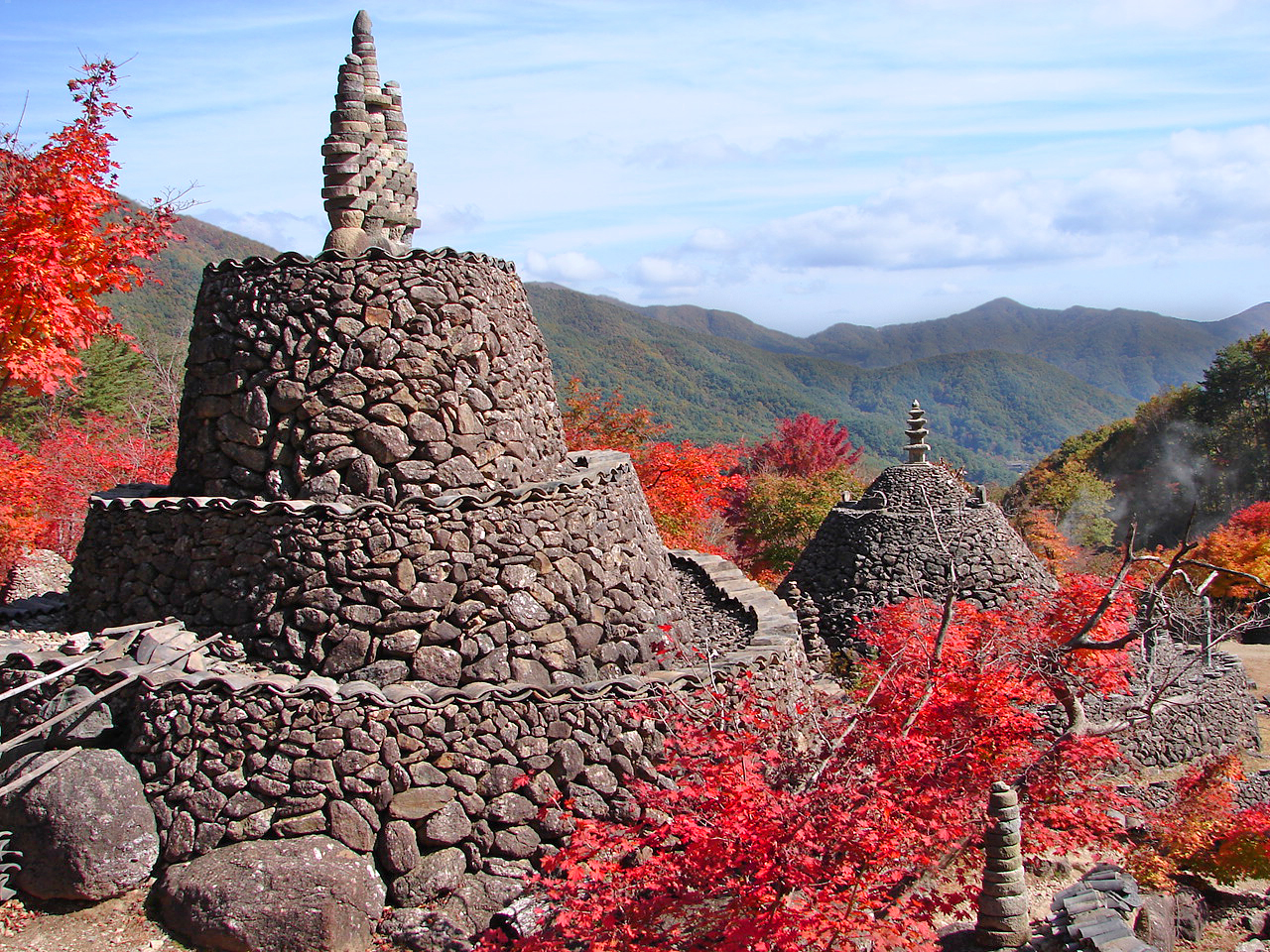
One of the larger Bangsadaps

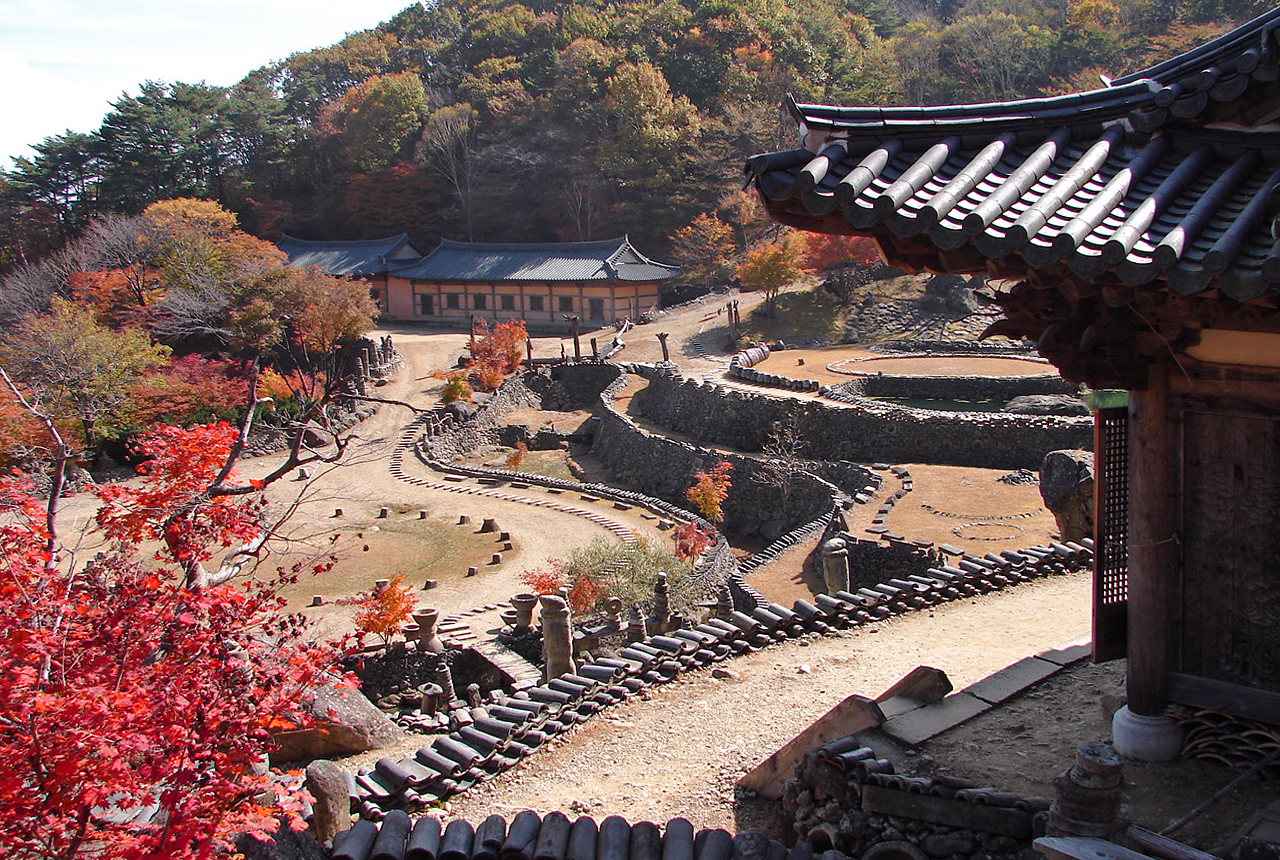
Samseonggung performance area

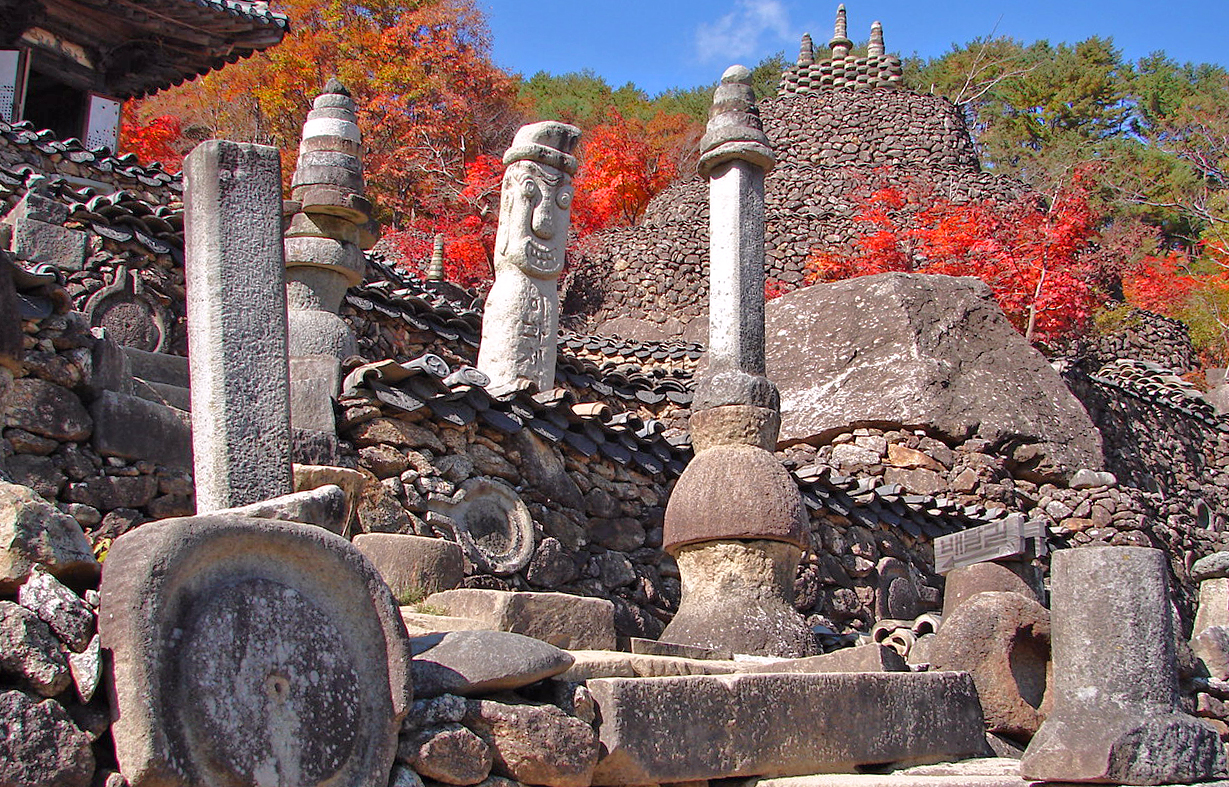
Stone Jangseung

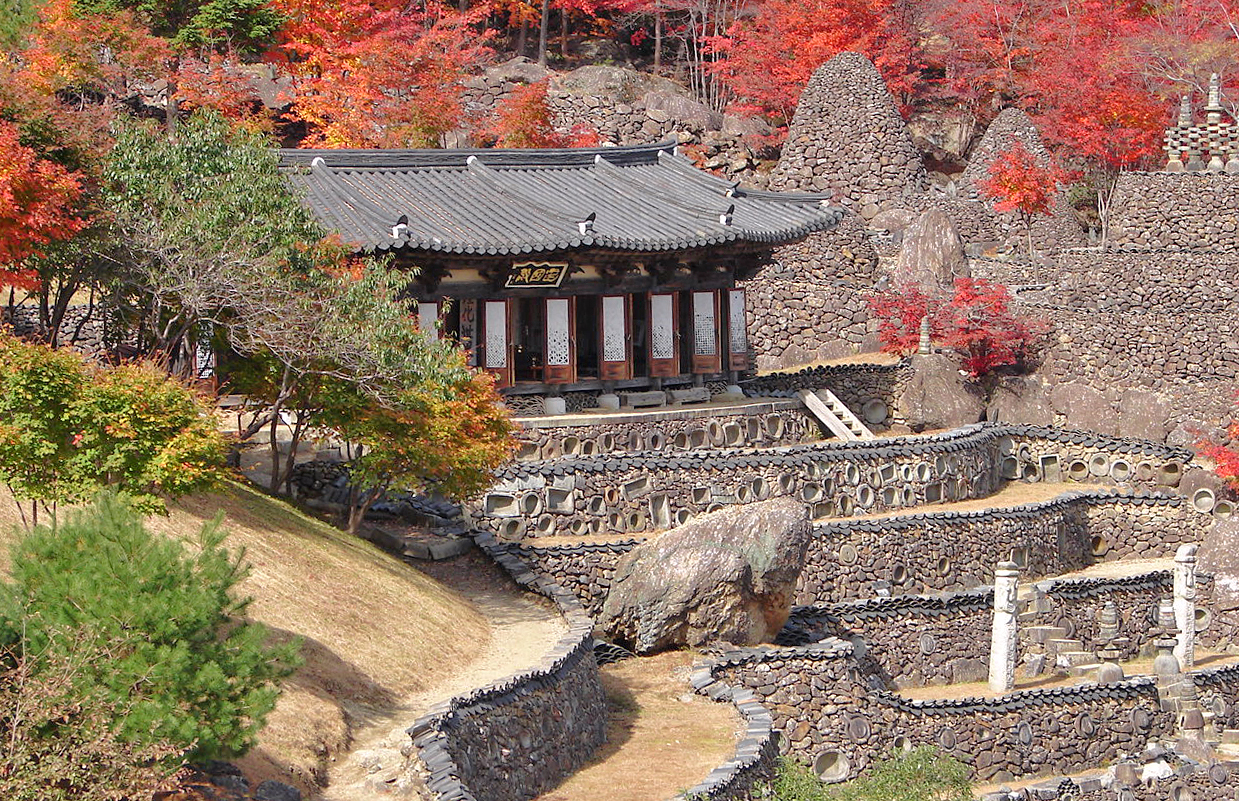
Samseonggung Cheongung

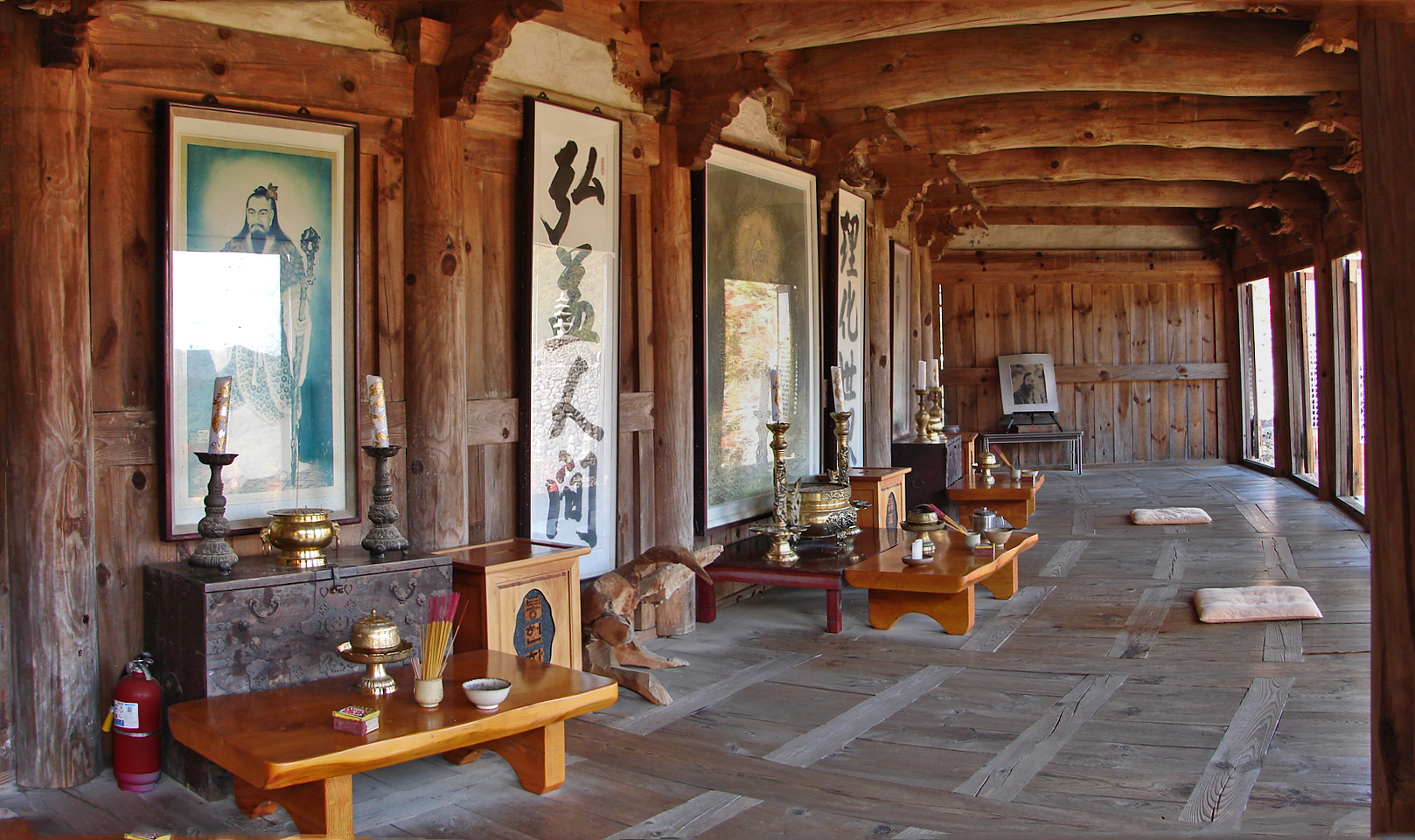
Inside Samseonggung Cheongung

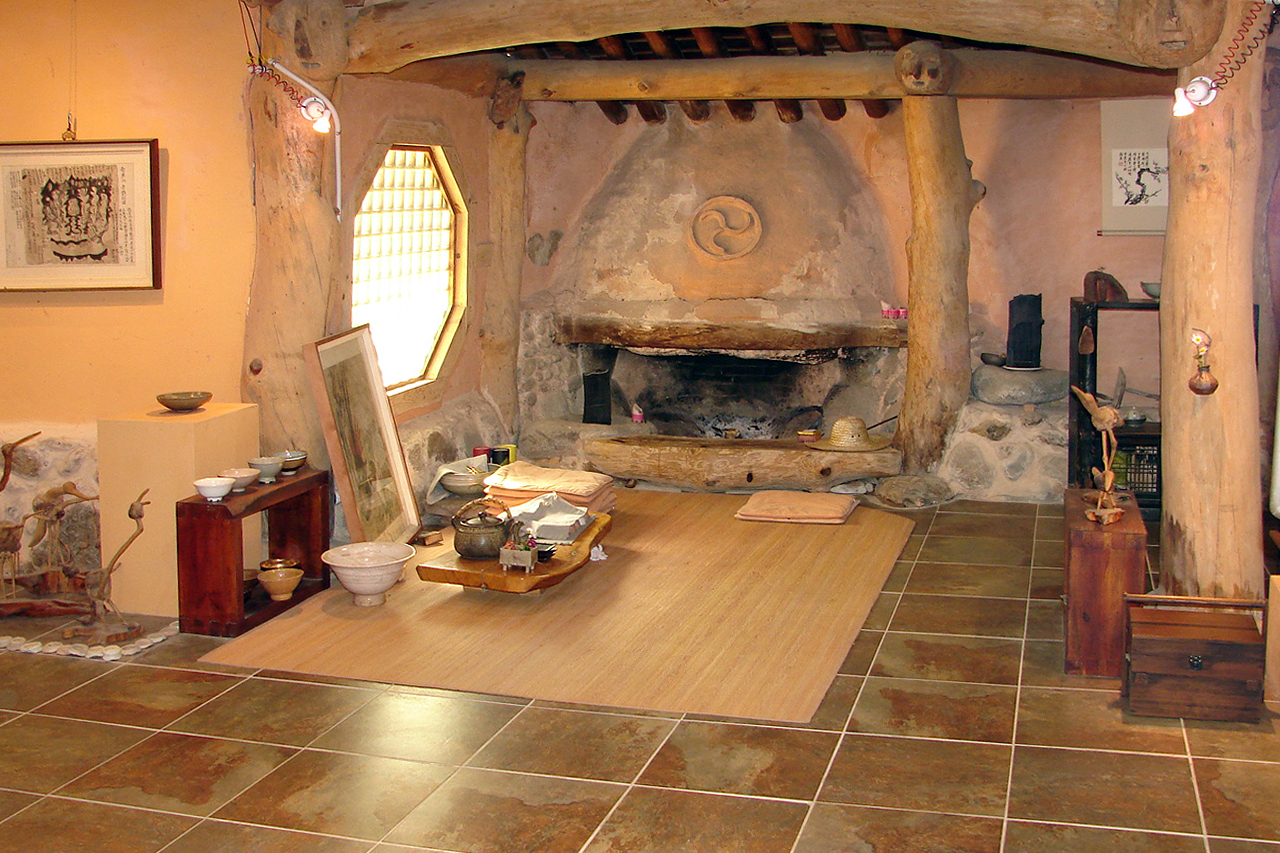
Inside Samseonggung museum
