= Budoji =

1953 Korean pseudo-historian text

- Hangul: 부도지
- Hanja: 符都誌
- RR: Budoji
- MR: Pudoji

Budoji is a pseudo-historical work on East Asian and Korean culture written by Bak Geum (박금) in 1953, that claims to be a recollection of the contents of the original Budoji, which is supposedly one of the 15 books in a collection called Jing Shim Rok that has been passed down from the period of the Silla dynasty. Bak Geum states he left the Jing Shim Rok in the North on his escape to South Korea during the North-South Korean war, rewriting the current Budoji from memory after his escape.

The Budoji is claimed to have been the first of the 15 books of the Jing Shim Rok with its focus on ancient history. The original Jing Shim Rok is told to have been written by Bak Jae Sang (박제상) during the Silla dynasty and passed down in the Bak family, and finally reaching Bak Geum before its loss during his escape to South Korea. The book is considered to be part of a pseudo historical narrative and is widely regarded as false by mainstream historians.

== Outline of Budoji ==
=== The Era of Mago ===
The first era of Korean history according to the book is called Mago (마고,麻故). Budoji states that there were four Heavenly people, who were Hwanggung (황궁씨; 黃穹氏), Baekso (백소,白巢), Cheonggung (청궁,靑穹) and Heukso (흑소,黑巢). The mother of Hwanggung and Cheonggung was Gungheui (궁희; 穹姬), and the mother of Baekso and Heukso was Soheui (소희,巢姬). The mother of Gungheui and Soheui was Mago. It is said that Mago, Soheui and Gungheui bore children without a father.

=== The Era of Budo ===
This chapter describes the supposed historical story about the four Heavenly people of Hwanggung, Baekso, Cheonggung and Heukso. The first son of Hwanggung, Yuin (유인씨,有因氏), received Cheonbusamin (천부삼인; 天符三印), and then he bequeathed the Cheonbusamin to Hwanin.

=== The Era of Hwanung ===
The son of Hwanin, Hwanung, received the Cheonbusamin from his father, and established the Budō. Budoji describes the achievement of Hwanung during the era in this chapter.

=== The Era of Gojoseon ===
It is described that Imgeom or Dangun is the son of Hwanung. Imgeom also received Cheonbusamin from his father, and then established the state called Gojoseon.

=== From Samhan to Three kingdoms of Korea ===
This chapter describes Samhan after the destruction of Gojoseon. Mahan was located in the north, Byeonhan was located in the south and Jinhan was located in the east. Then, Baekje succeeded Byeonhan and Goguryeo succeeded Mahan and Silla succeeded Jinhan.
