= Three Heavenly Seals =

Legendary tokens of authority in Korean mythology

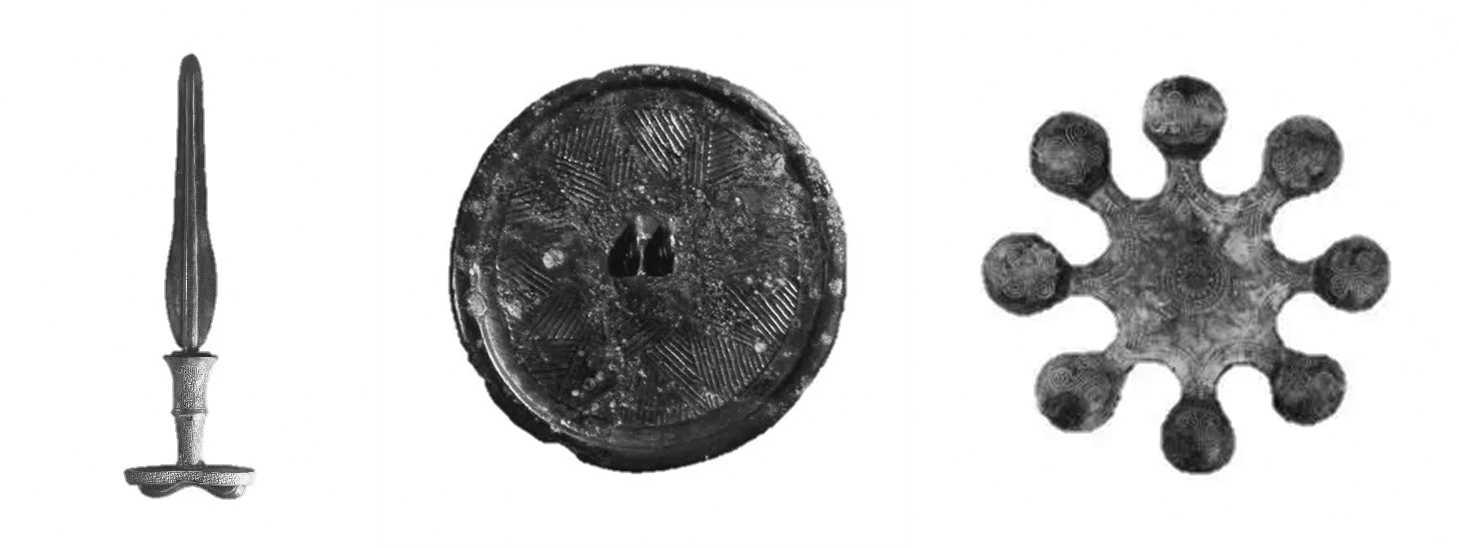
The Three Heavenly Seals according to historian Ch'oe Namsŏn: a bronze dagger, a bronze mirror, and a bronze bell.

The Three Heavenly Seals, also known as Ch'ŏnbuin (Korean: 천부인; Hanja: 天符印), as recounted in the Samguk yusa (13th c.), were tokens of authority bestowed from the god Hwanin to his son Hwanung for his descent from the heavens.

Though the relics are often associated with Bronze Age of Korea due to their material and production methods, their significance and meaning lie more on Korean shamanism and native beliefs.

== Overview ==
According to 20th century Korean historian Ch'oe Namsŏn, the treasures consist of three bronze items; a bronze dagger, a bronze mirror and a bronze bell. These items were mostly used as religious symbols rather than tools of intended purpose, and are considered unique to the Korean people and their heritage. The relics and their variants are part of the shamanistic tools called mugu (무구; 巫具) and are still used to this day by Korean shamans, though many of them have been succeeded by other ritual devices such as the mengdu.

The dagger, mirror, and bell are referred to as the "Heavenly Blade (神劒; 신검; Shingeom)", "Heavenly Mirror (神鏡; 신경; Shingyeong)", and "Heavenly Bell (神鈴; 신령; Shinryeong)", respectively.

=== Bipahyeongdonggeom ===
Distribution of lute-shaped daggers and slender daggers.

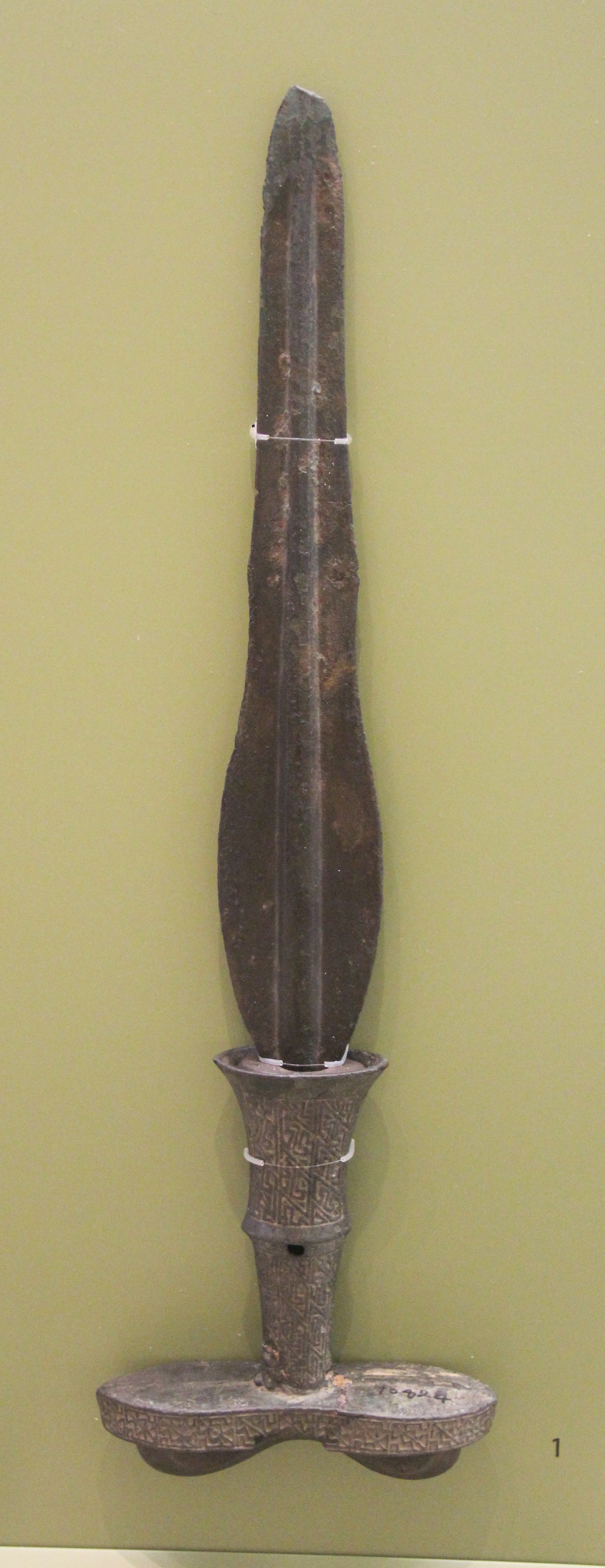
Bronze dagger

The bronze dagger, often referred to as "Bipahyeongdonggeom (琵琶形銅劍; 비파형동검)", bears a unique trait found in ancient Korea that is commonly associated with Northeast Asian civilizations. As seen in the Liaoning bronze dagger culture, the lute-shaped blade and detachable hilt is a common trait found within Manchuria, Korea, and Japan, and may signify a migration route based on the relics and their similar designs found only in the area.

=== Danyujomungyeong ===
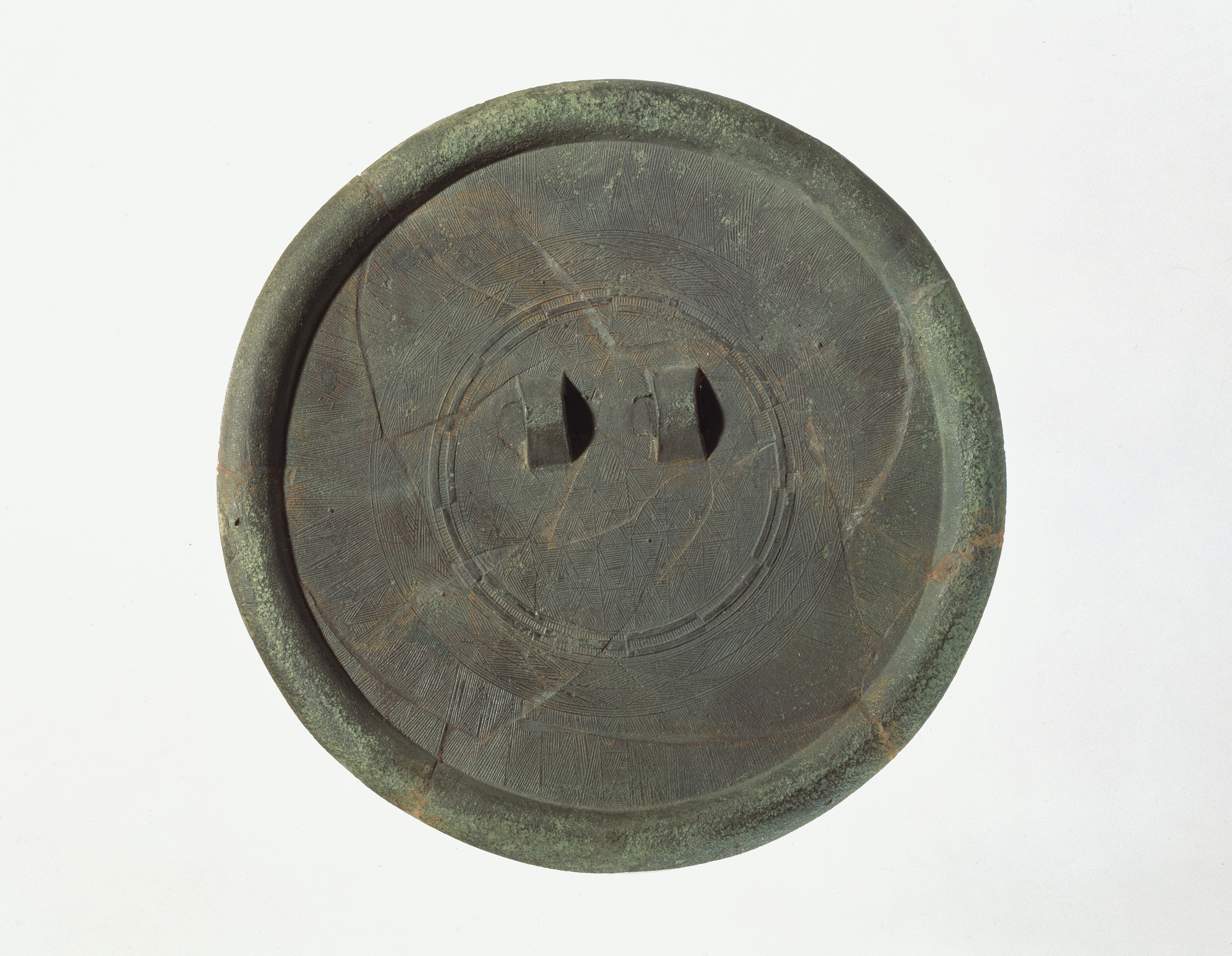
Bronze mirror

The bronze mirror of the Three Heavenly Seals known as "Danyujomungyeong (다뉴조문경; 多鈕粗文鏡)" is a symbolism of heroism reflected by the mirror. (Note: "조선 神道[신도]에서 거울 ー「명도」라 하는 神鏡[신경]과 또 근래 무식한 사람이 靑龍刀[청룡도]라고 하는 신검이 매우 중요한 의미 를 가지고, 그 鏡[경]은 바라보는 이의 神氣[신기]를 반사했다고 한다." "In Joseon Shinto, the mirror [shindo] called "myeongdo" and the sacred sword [shingyeong], which the ignorant people of recent times call the blue dragon sword [cheongryongdo], had a very important meaning, and it was said that the mirror [gyeong] reflected the divine energy [shingi] of the person looking at it." — Ch'oe Namsŏn, 天符印 三個) The mirror itself is an example of a "Rough-patterned mirror (거친무늬 거울; Geochinmunui geoul)" and are excavated commonly with the lute-shaped daggers in Northeast Asia.

=== Paljuryeong ===
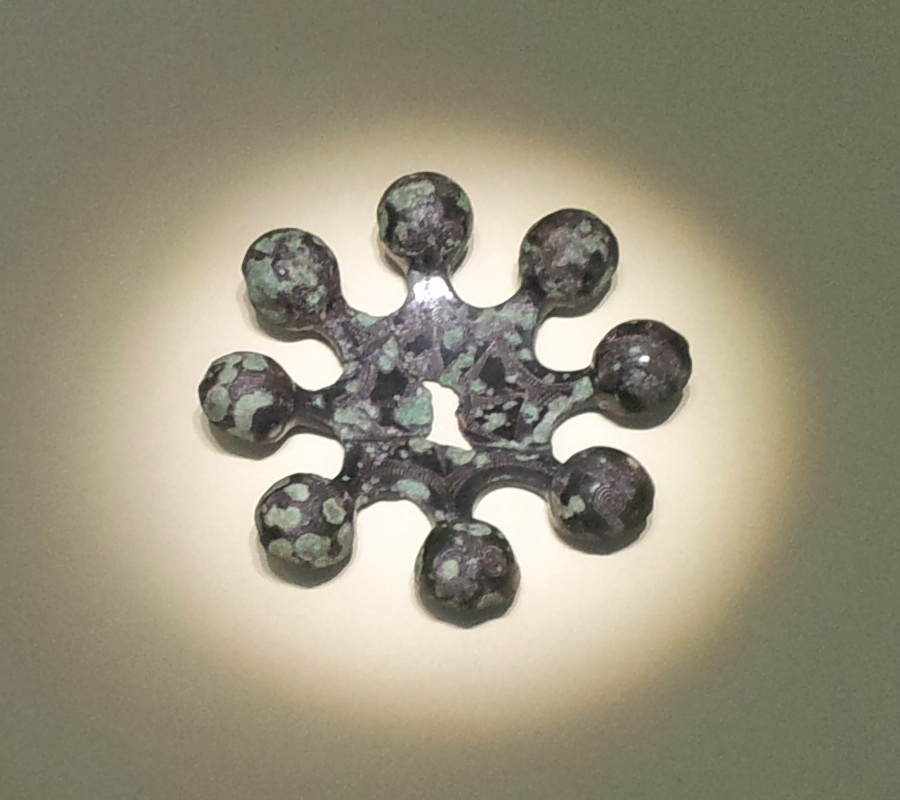
Eight-armed bronze bell

The bronze bell, also known as p'alduryŏng or paljuryeong (팔주령; 八珠鈴), is a unique design found only in Korea. Its eight-armed shape is attached with a bell at each end and produces a "majestic" sound when rattled.

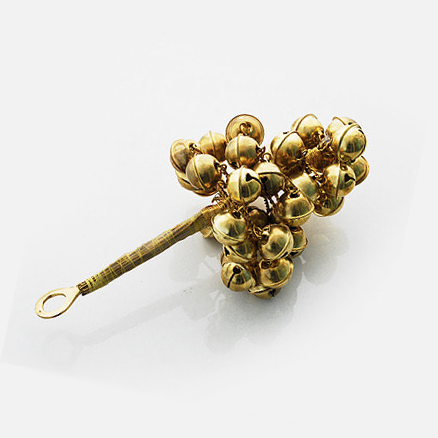
A shaman bell, the successor of the older Paljuryeong.

The bell has evolved over the many years, and has been succeeded by other bell designs such as the shaman bell (무당방울; mudangbangul) which bears a similar design with the suzu of Japan.

== Legacy ==
The relics may provide an insight to the topic of influx of migrants within the history of Korea. The story of Hwanin, Hwanung, and Dangun, is considered as a founding legend of the Yemaek people in northern Korea, and with the significance of the Three Heavenly Seals and their counterparts found in places such as Japan, it can be deduced that the beliefs that originated in Siberia were carried over to the Korean peninsula and later to the Japanese archipelago via migration.

Ch'oe Namsŏn posited that the similarities of ritual relics found in Manchuria, Korea, and Japan signified the evolution and transmission of shamanistic beliefs of Northeast Asia as myths similar to that of Dangun are found in Ainu and Siberian cultures.

== See also ==
- Imperial Regalia of Japan: Japan's counterparts to the Three Heavenly Seals
- Twelve Ornaments: China's counterparts to the Three Heavenly Seals
