= Tongguk t'onggam =

15th-century Korean history book

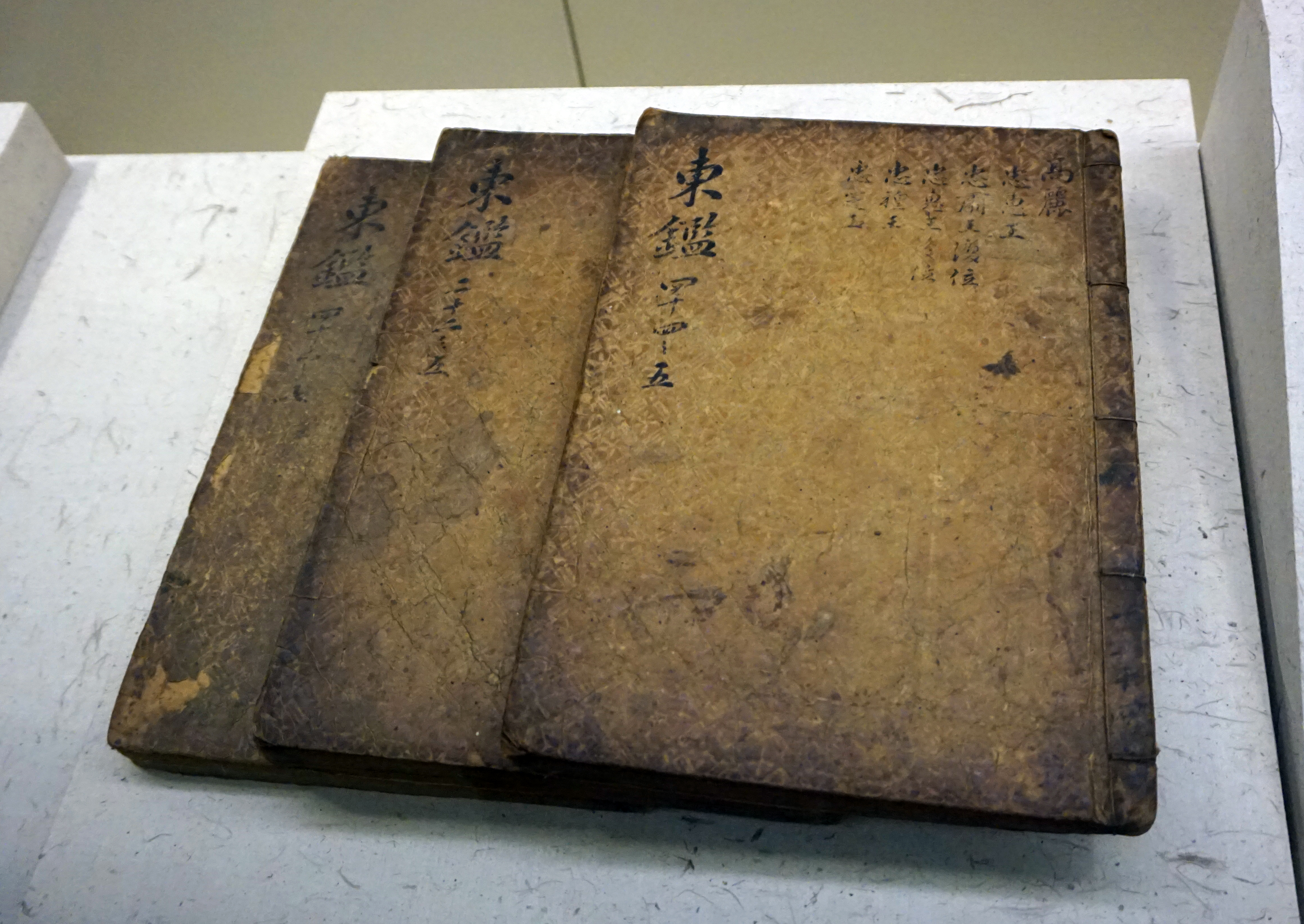
- Several volumes of the Tongguk t'onggam
- Author: Sŏ Kŏjŏng and others
- Language: Classical Chinese
- Publication date: 1485
- Publication place: Joseon

- Tongguk t'onggam
- Hangul: 동국통감
- Hanja: 東國通鑑
- Revised Romanization: Dongguk tonggam
- McCune–Reischauer: Tongguk t'onggam

The Tongguk t'onggam (Korean: 동국통감; RR: Dongguk tonggam; lit. 'Comprehensive Mirror of the eastern state'), is a chronicle of the early history of Korea compiled by Sŏ Kŏjŏng (1420–1488) and other scholars in the 15th century. Originally commissioned by King Sejo in 1446, it was completed under the reign of Seongjong of Joseon, in 1485. The official Ch'oe Pu was one of the scholars who helped compile and edit the work. The earlier works on which it may have been based have not survived. The Tongguk t'onggam is the earliest extant record to list the names of the rulers of Gojoseon after Dangun.

== Content ==
Tongguk t'onggam uses an annal form. Tongguk t'onggam is organised into 382 passages, of which 178 were selected from existing documents. The rest was written by the authors. In particular, Choi Bu authored 118 of them. Tongguk t'onggam is a valuable source of historical information and descriptions from Tangun to the later years of the Joseon Dynasty.

== Feature ==
In this book, the historical positions of Gija-Joseon, Mahan, and Silla, their successors, are elevated, and the positions of Dangun Chosun, Goguryeo, Baekje, Balhae and Goryeo are relatively lowered.

The book was first compiled by King Sejo in his attempt to reconstruct Korean history by accepting romantic and mythical historical descriptions rather than being bound by Confucian causes. However, it was not completed due to the uncooperative efforts of the Yushin groups to protect Confucian causes. <Samguksajeolyo> is part of the <Tongguk t'onggam>, which was revised under the Confucian justification, and was still part of the romantic atmosphere during King Sejo's reign.

== See also ==
- List of books about Korea
- History of Korea
