= Ungnyeo =

Bear woman in Korean creation myth

- Other names

Korean name
- Hangul: 웅녀
- Hanja: 熊女
- Lit.: bear woman
- RR: Ungnyeo
- MR: Ungnyŏ
- Venerated in: Daejongism; Muism
- Animals: Bear
- Gender: Female
- Ethnic group: Koreans

Genealogy
- Consort: Hwanung
- Offspring: Tan'gun
- Dynasty: Gojoseon

Equivalents
- Goguryeo: Susin?

Ungnyeo (Korean: 웅녀; Hanja: 熊女; lit. 'bear woman') was a bear who became a woman according to the creation myth of the Korean nation. She has an important role in the myth as the wife of Hwanung, the divine king of the world, and as the mother of Dangun, the mythological founder of Korea.

== Story ==
In the tale, a tiger and a bear lived together in a cave and prayed to the divine king Hwanung to be made human. Hwanung heard their prayers and gave them each 20 cloves of garlic and a bundle of mugwort, and ordered them to stay out of the sunlight and eat only this food for 100 days. Due to hunger, the tiger left the cave after roughly 20 days, but the bear remained inside. After 21 days, she was transformed into a woman.

Ungnyeo was grateful and made offerings to Hwanung. Her lack of a husband drove her to depression, and she began to pray beneath a sacred betula tree (신단수; 神檀樹) to be blessed with a child. Hwanung heard her prayers and was deeply moved. He took Ungnyeo as his wife and soon after, she gave birth to a son, Dangun, who would go on to found the nation of Korea.

== Interpretation of the story ==
There are two main characteristics of Ungnyeo. The founding myth of the Korean ancient nation generally sets the founder's paternal blood line as the Cheonsin (천신; 天神; lit. ''sky god'') and the mother line as the Jisin (Korean: 지신; Hanja: 地神; lit. ''land god''). This union of the divine and the land may partly serve as a political message. The earliest form of the myth is found at the beginning of the Samguk Yusa, a part-mythological, part-historical chronicle of Korea’s Three Kingdoms Period (primarily focusing on the kingdom of Silla). It was written by the Buddhist monk Ilyon during the late 13th century CE, while the Korean Peninsula was under Mongol rule. It is argued that starting the Samguk Yusa with this foundation myth serves as a subtle message that “‘Chinese’ authority is denied because… [Dangun’s] name was bestowed upon him by (presumably) his divine father,” which establishes Korea’s independence. To this day, this foundation myth is a “source of legitimacy” for both South and North Korea, and for Korean Nationalism. As a result of this divine legitimacy, Ungnyeo is regarded as a type of totem deified by Dangun's mother lineage. Totemism is “the belief that a tribe or clan is identified with or descended from a certain animal,” and it is believed that she represents an ancient clan that had the bear as their totem. Because Dangun is regarded as “the ancestor of the Koreans” in mythology, it is theorized that the people of this bear clan were the ancestors of Koreans in reality.

On the other hand, the bear itself has implications regarding religion and gender. The bear is the god of the land and symbolizes the uterus that produces products in farming culture. Thus, bears are predominantly interpreted as female. Ungnyeo is also interpreted as a kind of female god. Additionally, Ha and Mintz argue in the introduction of their English translation of the Samguk Yusa that Ungnyeo being female may be a sign that the bear-totem clan she might represent was either matriarchal, or at least matrilineal. Regardless of existing gender roles in ancient Korea, the introduction of Confucianism solidified patriarchy in the peninsula, and this was reflected in myths and folktales. Through a Confucian lens, Ungnyeo represents the ideal woman: she was rewarded for her patience and obedience by becoming a woman, and her desire to be a wife and a mother fit two of the roles that a woman was expected to fill (the other role being a daughter).

The garlic and mugwort given to Ungnyeo and her tiger companion at the beginning of the myth are also significant because they are used for specific purposes. It is a common misconception that the garlic given was the same garlic that is widely used today; however, it has been noted that garlic is not native to Korea. The part of the Samguk Yusa that describes 20 cloves of garlic being given is written as “san isip mae” (산이십매). Here, “san” is a word that refers to garlic and a related bulb native to the region called “Dallae” (달래). Park Gwang-min, a researcher at the Korean Language Education Research Association, argues in his paper, “Study of Korean Oriental Political Thought History,” that the bulbs described as “san” would have been what are now known as “mureut” (무릇), which is a “famine relief plant.” Mugwort has long been a treatment for women’s reproductive health. In the ancient and medieval world, in both Asia and Europe, it was believed that women’s bodies are inherently colder. This is based on Galenic humoralism, the pre-modern system of medicine which states that the human body contains four humors (yellow bile, black bile, white phlegm, and red blood); it was further believed that the humors were “defined by the combination of the qualities heat, cold, dryness, and wetness,” with women being generally cold and wet. East Asian medical theory integrated humoralism into the concepts of yin and yang, with women (closer to yin) having a “weaker, wet, dark, and cold nature,” and men (closer to yang) having a “stronger, drier, bright, and hot nature.” With humoralism, it was believed that menstruation and fertility issues were due to the woman in question being too cold. Mugwort was the primary warming treatment for women across Eurasia, and it is still used to treat various conditions in women in Korean traditional medicine today. The most common method of using mugwort in Korea has been to ingest it with food, while fumigation and moxibustion (“burning moxa, a dried sponge made of mugwort, on or above the skin”) are also used.
