= Tan'gun =

Korean king and deity

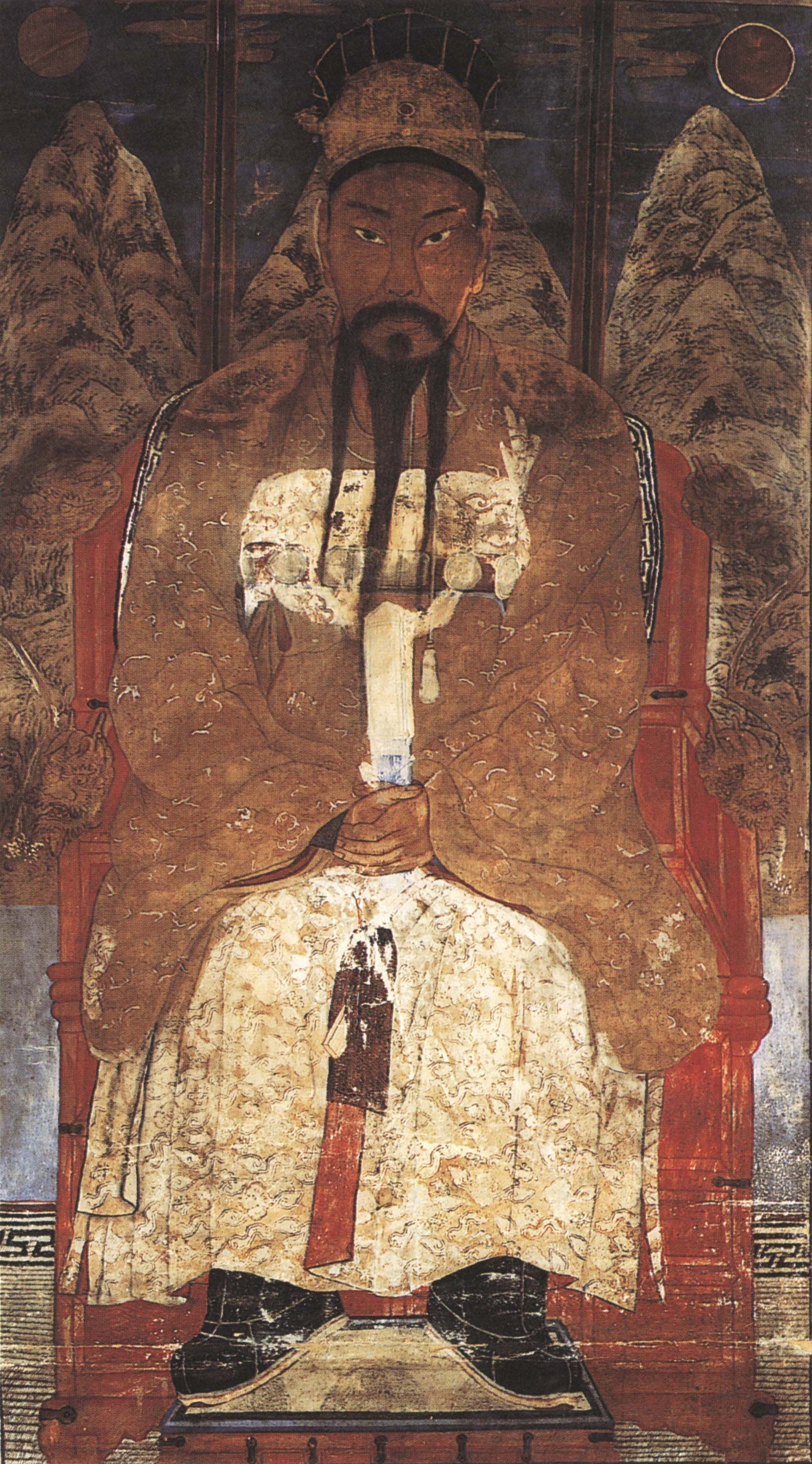
- Portrait of Tan'gun (by Chae Yong-sin, 19–20th century)

King of Gojoseon
- Reign: c. 2333 BC – c. 2240 BC
- Predecessor: Hwanung
- Successor: Jizi?
- Dynasty: Gojoseon
- Father: Hwanung
- Mother: Ungnyeo

Korean name
- Hangul: 단군왕검
- Hanja: 檀君王儉
- RR: Dangun wanggeom
- MR: Tan'gun wanggŏm
- IPA: [tan.ɡun waŋ.ɡʌm]

Tan'gun (Korean: 단군; Hanja: 檀君; pronounced [tan.ɡun]), also known as Tan'gun Wanggŏm (단군왕검; 檀君王儉; [tan.ɡun waŋ.ɡʌm]), was the legendary founder and first king of Gojoseon, the first Korean kingdom. He founded the first kingdom around the northern part of the Korean Peninsula. He is said to be the "grandson of heaven", "son of a bear", and to have founded the first kingdom in 2333 BC.

The earliest recorded version of the Tan'gun legend appears in the 13th-century Samguk yusa, which purportedly cites Korea's lost historical record, Gogi (고기; 古記; lit. 'Ancient Record') and China's Book of Wei. However, there are no records related to Tan'gun in the current surviving version of the Book of Wei.

Koreans celebrate Tan'gun's founding of Gojoseon, Korea's first dynasty, on 3 October as a national holiday known as National Foundation Day (Gaecheonjeol). It is a religious anniversary started by Daejongism (대종교; 大倧教), worshipping Tan'gun.

Many Korean historians regard Tan'gun and Tengri as being etymologically identical.

== Myth and interpretations ==
In Korean mythology, Tan'gun's ancestry legend begins with his grandfather Hwanin (환인; 桓因), the "Lord of Heaven". Hwanin had a son, Hwanung, who yearned to live on the earth among the valleys and the mountains. Hwanin permitted Hwanung and 3,000 followers to descend onto Taebaeksan (written as Myohyang-san in samguk sagi, but now believed to be Paektu Mountain), where Hwanung founded Sinsi (신시; 神市, "City of God"). Along with his ministers of clouds, rain and wind, he instituted laws and moral codes and taught humans various arts, medicine, and agriculture. Legend attributes the development of acupuncture and moxibustion to Tan'gun.

A tiger and a bear prayed to Hwanung that they might become human. Upon hearing their prayers, Hwanung gave them twenty cloves of garlic and a bundle of mugwort, ordering them to eat only this sacred food and remain out of the sunlight for 100 days. The tiger gave up after about twenty days and left the cave. However, the bear persevered and was transformed into a woman. The bear and the tiger are said to represent two tribes that sought the favor of the heavenly prince.

The bear-woman, Ungnyeo, was grateful and made offerings to Hwanung. However, she lacked a husband, and soon became sad and prayed beneath a "divine birch" tree (신단수; 神檀樹; shindansu) to be blessed with a child. Hwanung, moved by her prayers, took her for his wife and soon she gave birth to a son named Tan'gun Wang'gŏm.

Tan'gun ascended to the throne, built the walled city of Asadal situated near Pyongyang (the location is disputed), and called the kingdom Joseon—referred to today as Gojoseon so as not to be confused with the later kingdom of Joseon that was established roughly 2000 years later. He then moved his capital to Asadal on Mount Paegak or Mount Gunghol.

Tan'gun's biography reflected the interest of the people of Dangun Joseon (Gojoseon) at the time in establishing the legitimacy of the kingship of Gojoseon and the dignity of the country. The king of Gojoseon conducted a ritual in honor of his ancestral god every year. Soon, the myth of Tan'gun was the political ideology of the Gojoseon period, and the ritual had a function of political assembly.

=== Dates ===
Emperor Tan'gun's rule is usually calculated to begin in 2333 BCE, based on the description of the Tongguk t'onggam (1485) contrary to the 40th year of the reign of the legendary Chinese Emperor Yao. Other sources vary somewhat, but also put it during Yao's reign (traditional dates: 2357 BC-2256 BC). The Samguk yusa states Tan'gun ascended to the throne in the 50th year of Yao's reign, while Annals of the Joseon Dynasty says the first year and Tongguk t'onggam says the 25th year.

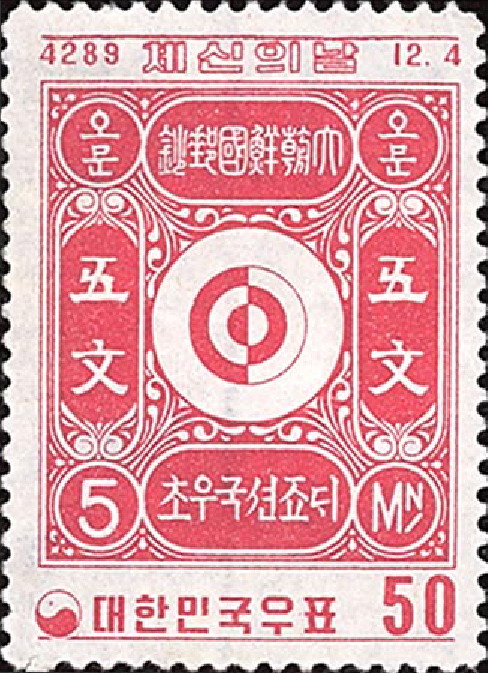
A South Korean postage stamp in 1956 (Dangi 4289)

Until 1961, the official South Korean era (for numbering years) was called the Dangi (단기; 檀紀), which began in 2333 BC. Followers of Daejongism considered 3 October in the Korean calendar as Gaecheonjeol. This day is now a public holiday in South Korea in the Gregorian calendar called "National Foundation Day". North Korea dates Tan'gun's founding of Gojoseon to the early 30th century BC.

15 March in the year 4380 BC of the Tan'gun Era is called "Royal Day Festival" (어천절; 御天節; Eocheonjeol), the day that the semi-legendary founder Tan'gun returned to the heavens.

=== Historical perception ===
Tan'gun began to attract attention during the late Goryeo dynasty, when Koreans fought wars against the Mongolian Yuan dynasty. During the Joseon period they were worshiped as the ancestors of the nation. In the Joseon dynasty, a shrine dedicated to Tan'gun of Gojoseon and King Chumo of Goguryeo was built in Pyongyang, and the Samseongdang (삼성당; 三聖堂), dedicated to the gods of Hwanin, Hwanung, and Tan'gun, was built.

In Korea at the end of the 19th century, it was greatly emphasized to highlight the resistance of the Joseon people against Imperialist invasion, and it developed into a religion, Dangunkyo (단군교; 檀君敎). Tan'gun, who emerged as the central figure of nationalism, played a large role in the spiritual foundation of the independence movement during the Japanese colonial period. In addition, the history of the Tan'gun era was compiled by followers of Daejongism, such as 'Daedong Sagang' (대동사강) and 'Gyuwon Sahwa' (규원사화) and the independence movement, emphasizing the history of the Tan'gun period.

The study of Tan'gun in South Korea focused on the historical significance of the Gojoseon society. In South Korea, Tan'gun Wanggeom is regarded as the head of the Gojoseon society, with many characteristics of the role of high priest. Wanggeom has the meaning of an overlord who governs the country.

In North Korea, the Tan'gun and Tan'gun myths were previously established as the founding myth to justify the process of establishing the Gojoseon regime. However, after the excavation of the supposedly tomb of Tan'gun in 1994, North Korea changed its position and claimed that the Tan'gun myth reflects historical facts and that Tan'gun is a real person. The tomb of Tan'gun was reconstructed and became the Mausoleum of Tangun.

== Appearances ==
The earliest recorded version of the Tan'gun legend appears in the 13th century Samguk yusa, which cites China's Book of Wei and Korea's lost history text Gogi (고기; 古記). This is the best known and most studied version, but similar versions are recorded in the Jewang Un-gi by the late Goryeo scholar Yi Seunghyu (이승휴; 李承休, 1224–1300), as well as the Eungje Siju (응제시주; 應製詩註) and Sejong Sillok (세종실록; commonly known as "Annals of the Joseon Dynasty", Sejong Jang-heon Dae-wang Shil-lok; 세종장헌대왕실록; 世宗莊憲大王實錄) of the early Joseon. Tan'gun is worshipped today as a deity by the followers of Cheondoism and Daejongism.

=== In Taekwondo ===
Dan-Gun is the second pattern or teul in the International Taekwon-Do Federation form of the Korean martial art taekwondo. Students learn that the teul represents "the holy legendary founder of Korea in the year 2333 BC."

=== In Muism ===
In Korean shamanism, Tan'gun is worshiped as one of Wangshin (Korean: 왕신; Hanja: 王神; lit. 'King god').

== Mausoleum of Tan'gun ==
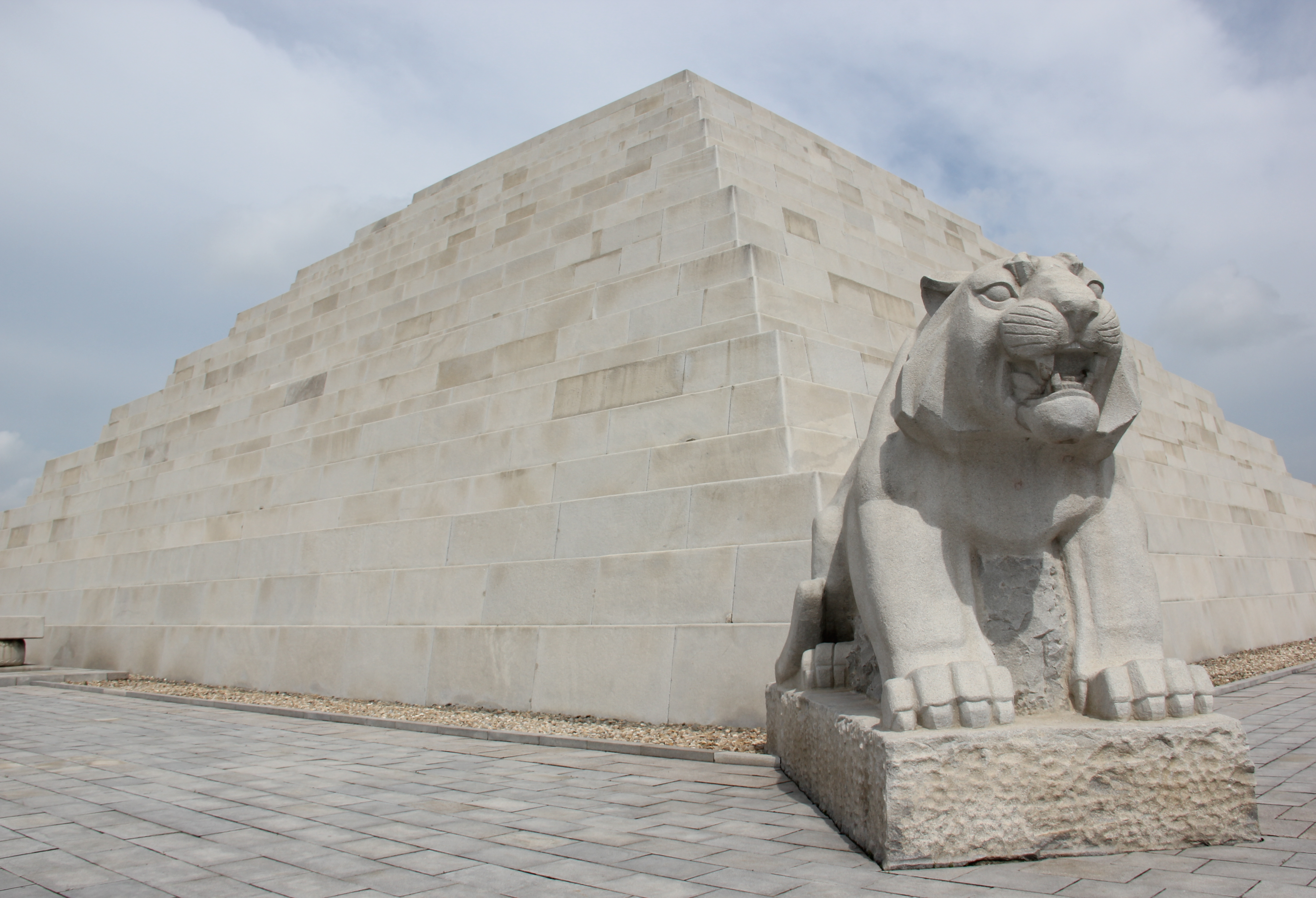
Mausoleum of Tangun, in Kangdong County, North Korea

North Korea's leader Kim Il Sung insisted that Tan'gun was not merely a legend but a real historical person. As a consequence, North Korean archaeologists were compelled to locate the purported remains and grave of Tan'gun.

According to a North Korean publication, the Mausoleum of Tan'gun is the alleged burial site of the legendary Tan'gun.

== See also ==
- Tengri
- Musok
- Daejongism
- History of Korea
- Religion in Korea
- Yellow Shamanism
- Manchu shamanism
- Shamanism in Siberia
- Turco-Mongol tradition
- Tungusic creation myth
- List of national founders

Tan'gun Wanggŏm House of Gojseon
Regnal titles
New creation	King of Gojseon c. 2333 BC – c. 2240 BC	Unknown Next known title holder: Jizi
