= Haneunim =

Sky god of Cheondoism and Jeungsanism

- Personification of Heaven
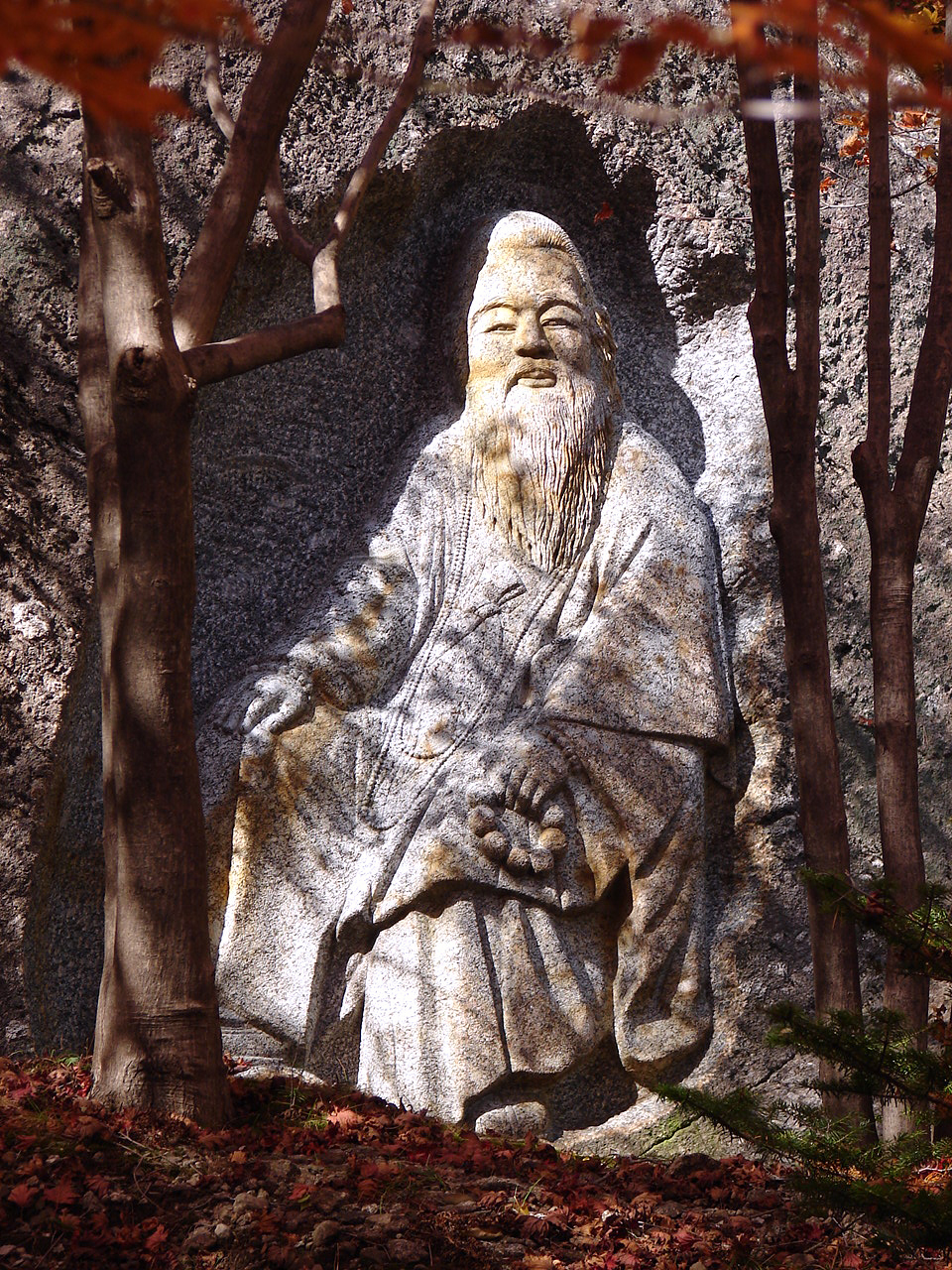
- Hwanin represented at the Samseonggung.
- Other names: Hanunim; Hananim; Haneullim; Hwanin
- Hangul: 하느님
- Venerated in: Daejongism; Cheondoism; Muism
- Abode: Sky
- Artifacts: Three Heavenly Seals
- Gender: Male
- Region: Korea
- Ethnic group: Koreans

Genealogy
- Offspring: Hwanung
- Dynasty: Gojoseon

Equivalents
- Hindu: Indra
- Buddhist: Śakra
- Chinese: Tian; Shangdi; Yudi
- Japanese: Izanagi
- Vietnamese: Ông Trời

Haneunim (Korean: 하느님; lit. 'Lord of Heaven') (Note: also spelled Hanallim (하ㄴㆍㄹ님/하날님), Hanullim (한울님), birth name Hwanin (환인; 桓仁 or 桓因), also called Sangje (상제; 上帝, "Highest Deity"), Sangjenim (상제님; 上帝任/mixed script: 上帝님, "Highest Divine Lord"), or Cheonju (천주; 天主, "Heavenly Lord"/"Lord of Heaven"), or known simply as Haneul (하늘 "Heaven"), Cheon (천; 天, "Heaven", in Sino-Korean), Cheonje (천제; 天帝, "Heavenly Emperor"/"Emperor of Heaven", in Sino-Korean), or Cheon-sin / Cheon-shin (천신; 天神, "God of Heaven")) or Hananim (Korean: 하나님) is the sky god in Korean mythology. In the more Buddhist-aligned parts of these religions, he is identified with Indra. In the more Taoist-aligned parts of these religions, he is identified with Okhwang Sangje (옥황상제; 玉皇上帝; lit. 'Jade Emperor'). Under that name, he is a deity in the Poncheongyo religion. He is also the chief deity in the Jeusangist family of faiths.

Today, Haneunim and Hananim are used as Korean translations for the English word God.

== Dangun myth ==
Dangun is traditionally considered to be the grandson of Hwanin, the "Heavenly King", and founder of the Korean nation. Myths similar to that of Dangun are found in Ainu and Siberian cultures.

The myth starts with prince Hwanung ("Heavenly Prince"), son of Hwanin. The prince asked his father to grant him governance over Korea. Hwanin accepted, and Hwanung was sent to Earth bearing three Heavenly Seals and accompanied by three thousand followers. The prince arrived under the sindansu (신단수; 神檀樹; lit. 'Holy Tree of Sandalwood') on the holy mountain, where he founded his holy city.

At the time of his reign, Ungnyeo—bear—and a tiger were living in a cave near the holy city, praying earnestly that their wish to become part of humankind might be fulfilled. Ungnyeo patiently endured weariness and hunger, and after twenty-one days she was transformed into a woman, while the tiger ran away for it could not tolerate the effort. The woman Ungnyeo was overjoyed, and visiting the sandalwood city she prayed that she might become the mother of a child.

Ungnyeo's wish was fulfilled, so that she became the queen and gave birth to a prince who was given the royal name of Dangun: the "Sandalwood King". Dangun reigned as the first human king of Korea, giving to his kingdom the name of Joseon, "Land of the Morning Calm", in 2333 BC.

According to some scholars, the name Dangun is related to the Turko-Mongol Tengri ("Heaven"), while the bear is a symbol of the Big Dipper (i.e. Ursa Major), itself a symbol of the supreme God in many Eurasian cultures. Later in the myth, Dangun becomes the Sansin, the "Mountain God" (metaphorically of civilising growth, prosperity).

== See also ==
- Chinese theology
  - Tao
  - Three Pure Ones
  - Tian—Shangdi

Counterparts of Haneullim in other Asian cultures

- Amenominakanushi, the Japanese counterpart
- Indra/Trimurti, the Hindu counterpart
- Jade Emperor, the Chinese counterpart
- Ông Trời, the Vietnamese counterpart
- Śakra/Adi Buddha, the Buddhist counterpart
- Tengri, the Turko-Mongolian counterpart
- Thagyamin, the Burmese Buddhist representation of Śakra, a counterpart of the Jade Emperor

== Sources ==
- Didier, John C. (2009). "In and Outside the Square: The Sky and the Power of Belief in Ancient China and the World, c. 4500 BC – AD 200". Sino-Platonic Papers (192). Victor H. Mair. Volume I: The Ancient Eurasian World and the Celestial Pivot, Volume II: Representations and Identities of High Powers in Neolithic and Bronze China, Volume III: Terrestrial and Celestial Transformations in Zhou and Early-Imperial China.
- Lee, Chi-ran (2010s). "The Emergence of National Religions in Korea" (PDF). Archived from the original (PDF) on 13 April 2014.
- Lee, Jung Young (1981). Korean Shamanistic Rituals. Mouton De Gruyter. ISBN 9027933782.
- Hong, Sung-wook (2009). Naming God in Korea. Wipf & Stock. ISBN 978-1606086261.
