= Daejongism =

South Korean new religious movement

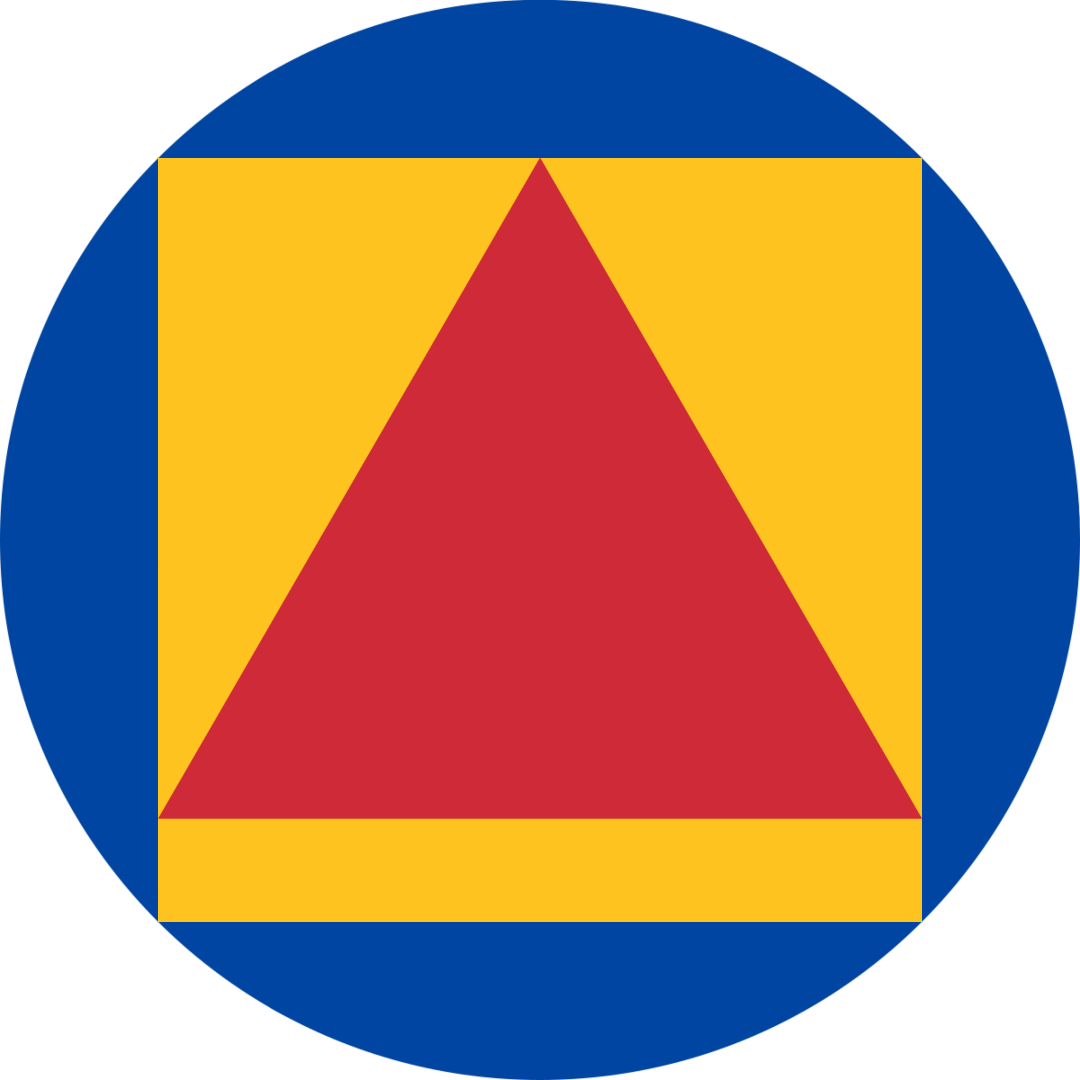
- Symbol of Daejongism

Korean name
- Hangul: 대종교
- Hanja: 大倧敎
- RR: Daejonggyo
- MR: Taejonggyo

Daejongism (Korean: 대종교; Hanja: 大倧敎, "religion of the Divine Progenitor" or "great ancestral religion") and Dangunism (단군교, 檀君敎 Dangungyo or Tangunkyo, "religion of Dangun") are the names of a number of religious movements focused on the worship of Dangun (or Tangun). There are around seventeen of these groups, the main one of which was founded in Seoul in 1909 by Na Cheol (1864–1916).

Dangunists believe their mythos to be the authentic Korean native religion, that was already around as Gosindo (古神道, "way of the Ancestral God" or "ancient way of God") at the time of the first Mongol invasions of Korea, and that was revived as "Daejongism" (Daejonggyo) just at the start of the Japanese occupation. The religion was suppressed during the Japanese rule.

The religion believes in one God manifested in three persons, whose earthly incarnation was the legendary king Dangun, who ruled over a Korean empire around 5000 years ago. Its main tenet is that the Koreans have their own God and they have no need to worship foreign gods. Its emphasis is on the national identity and unity of the Korean people (known as minjok) and as such has been associated with Korean nationalism (and sometimes ultranationalism).

Daejongism does not focus so much on institutions or rituals but rather on central doctrines and associated mythologies, so that it is more definable as a creed or a faith system rather than an organized religion. In the decade of 1910 to 1920, it had its major growth, reaching an estimated following of 400,000. Its popularity was largely due to its efforts on behalf of Korean independence. Once this aim was achieved, its membership declined, although Daejongism acquired a reputation for its educational and scholarly institutions, which published in particular monumental works about Korea's struggle for independence and Daejongism's contribution to it. A 1995 census found that fewer than 10,000 Koreans claimed to follow the religion, although Korean census figures systematically underestimate the number of followers of new religions, who are often reluctant to indicate their religious affiliation.

== Teaching ==
The Sacred Portrait of Dangun in Daejonggyo

Central to the faith is the belief in Haneullim, the triad of Gods of Korean culture: the creator (Hanim/Hwanin), the teacher (Hanung/Hwanung) and the ruler (Dangun/Hanbaegŏm). Dangun, the leader of the Korean nation, is thought to be the third, and human, manifestation of Haneullim ("God of Heaven") or Haneul ("Heaven"). His physical mother was Ungnyeo (熊女) a bear transformed into a woman.

After his earthly reign, Dangun ascended to Heaven. Semantically, Haneul connotes three Gods: God-Father as the creator of the universe, God-Teacher as the mentor of universal nature and God-King as ruler of creation.

The faith is embodied in three sacred texts. Believers claim that they date back to the time of Dangun, or even earlier, and this claim, although disputed by scholars, is also accepted by many Koreans who do not belong to Daejongism. The three texts are the Ch'ónbugong (The Classic of the Seal of Heaven), a narrative of the origins of the world, the Samil sin'go (The Teachings of the Triune God), a theological statement, and the Ch'amjóngyóng (The Classic of the Wise One), a manual of ethics. A number of scholars believe that these books were compiled in the first two decades of the 20th century, based on visions and revelation the founder of Daejongism, Na Cheol (1863–1916), claimed to have received.

Daejongism is also well known for its teaching of breathing techniques, known in the West as part of the so-called internal alchemy (Neidan in Taoism). Daejongism's techniques focus on the '"sea of energy," which is also often referred to as the cinnabar field or the elixir field (tanjón).The tanjon is a field rich in the vital energy Qi and the religion offers techniques to draw on this field and circulate the energy through the human body. These techniques became extremely popular in the 1970s and generated a new interest in Daejongism and its school of internal alchemy, known as Kich'ónmun.

== Samsin Sinang ==
Samsin Sinang is a Dangunist sect. Its headquarters are in Pyeongchang County. The current leader is Bae Sun-moon, and the religion promotes the Korean reunification.

== History and influences ==
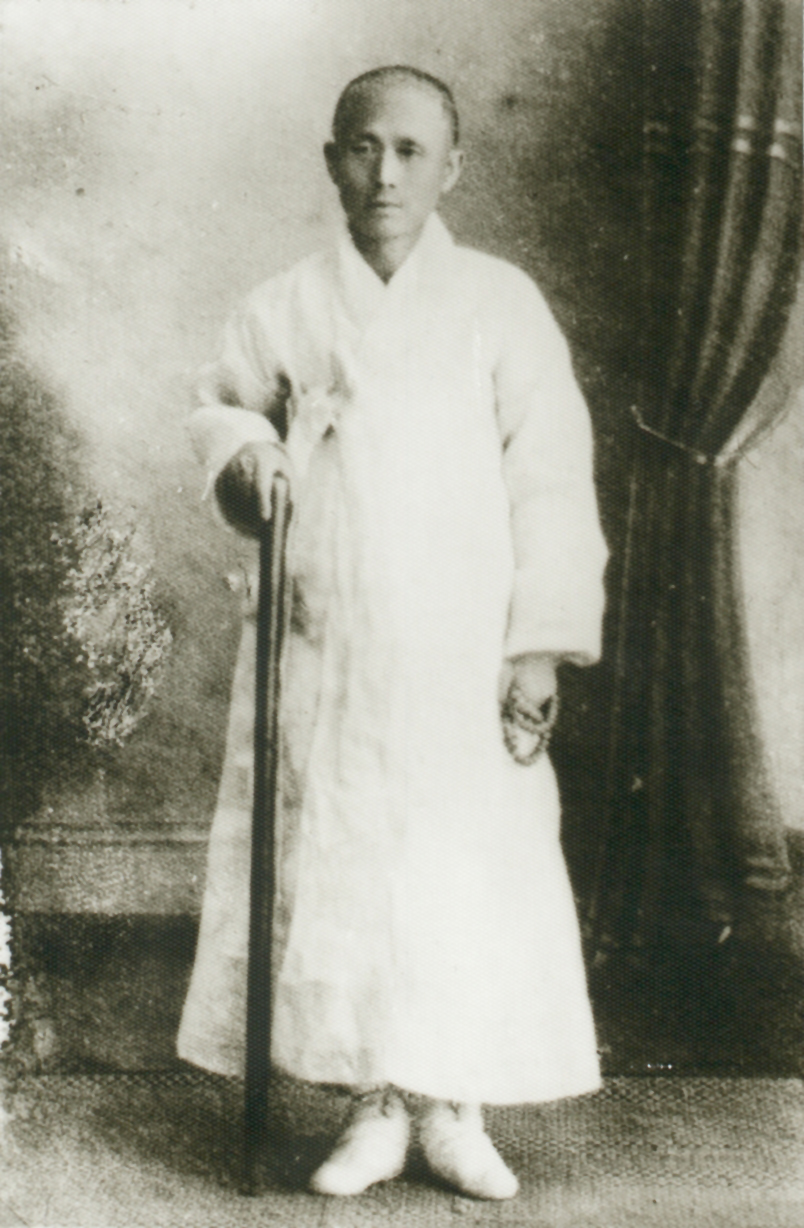
Na Cheol, the founder of the religion.

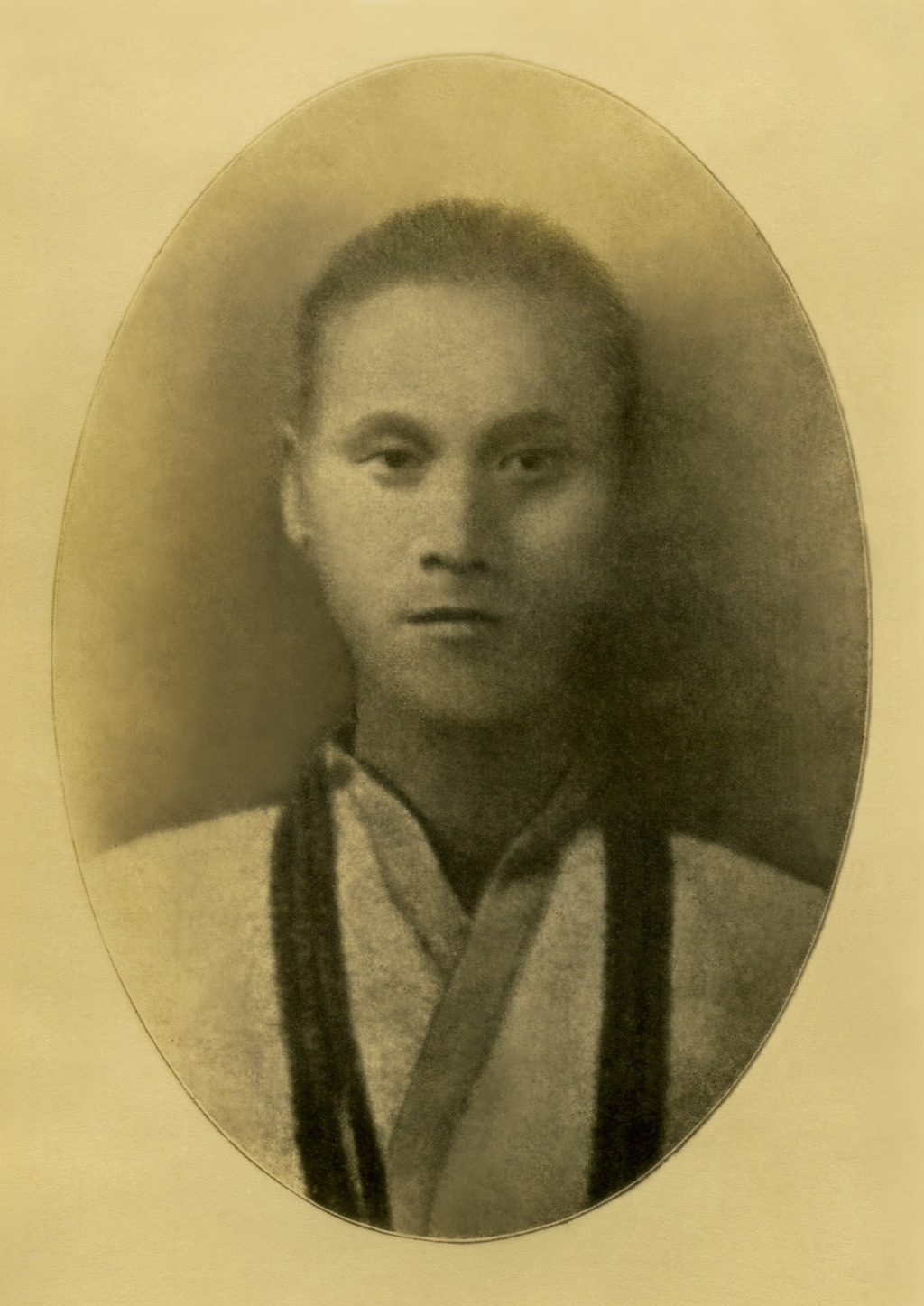
Seo Il, the Daejonggyo priest who inspired the militant Korean Independence Movements and became president of the Northern Military Administration Office and the Korean Independence Corps.

Na Cheol, known for his role as a leader of the Korean independence movement from Japanese rule, founded the religion in 1909 as its "great teacher" (tosagyo) and named it first "Dangunism" (Dangungyo, Dangun religion) and then a year later "Daejongism" (Daejonggyo).

He said that it was a revival of Goshindo (古神道, "way of the Ancestral God"), the belief in the trinitarian god that was worshipped in ancient Korea. Some scholars have suggested the affinity to Christianity, though the ethical basis of the religion is similar to Confucianism. Others believe that early Dajeongism tried to counter the growing influence of Christianity by replacing the Christian Trinity with a Korean one. In fact, criticism of Christianity has continued in Daejongism. In 1994, Han Ch'angbôm presented the Daejongism "case against Christianity," claiming that the God of the Bible was "jealous and violent" and thus inherently "immoral." The text also accused Christians of having been collaborators with the Japanese during the occupation.

The importance of Dangun was influenced by Shin Chaeho's A New Reading of History, and Dangun was emphasised over another legendary figure, Jizi (Kija), who was said to not be Korean in origin. Na claimed that the Goshindo religion was approximately 4300 years of age, which would make it Korea's oldest religion.

After the annexation of Korea in 1910 by the Empire of Japan, the new religion was spread in Manchuria by Na, where it set up schools and social centers, and became a focus of the Korean independence movement. Na committed suicide at a shrine on Kuwolsan in 1916, saying that he had guilt over his failures and was martyring himself for the sake of his religion, God and people.

Leaders of the religion after Na include his successor Kim Kyohong, and An Ho-Sang. The teachings of Dangun were said by Kim in his "History of the Divine Dangun's People" to be the sin gyo or "divine teaching", and he said that various Korean religions, such as that of Wang Kon, were continuations of the sin gyo, but that these beliefs had been suppressed under the Mongols, Buddhism, and Confucianism. The main task of the religion was chunggwang ("lighting anew"), meaning reviving the memory of Dangun.

A particularly controversial issue concerns the roots in Daejongism of the global physical exercise and spirituality system known as Body & Brain, Dahnhak, or Dahn Yoga, founded by Korean master of martial arts and author Ilchi Lee. While "Body and Brain" does not normally emphasize its connection with Daejongism, scholars see it as one of many schools teaching a form of internal alchemy based on the techniques Daejongism popularized. According to American scholar of Korean religion Don Baker, "not only-did Dahn claim that its techniques were the same practices that Tàn'gun [Dangun] taught when he ruled over the first Korean kingdom; it also heralded the three Tàn'gun-era sacred texts of Taejonggyo [Daejongism] as authentic scripture." Only when the movement became international, references to Dangun and Daejongism were downplayed, although the Daejongism symbol was embroidered on the original uniforms given to Dahnhak students in America and the organization "erected a large outdoor statue of Tan'gun near [its] Sedona [Arizona] headquarters." Baker states that references to Daejongism, although not made explicit, remain easy to detect for those familiar with the Korean religion.

== See also ==
- Cheondoism
- Jeungsanism

== Sources ==
- Baker, Don (2007a). "The Korean God Is Not the Christian God: Taejonggyo's Challenge to Foreign Religions." pp. 464–475 in Robert E. Buswell (ed.), Religions of Korea in Practice, Princeton (New Jersey) and Oxford (U.K.): Princeton University Press. ISBN 978-06-91113-47-0.
- Baker, Don (2007b). "Internal Alchemy in the Dahn World School." pp. 508–513 in Robert E. Buswell (ed.), Religions of Korea in Practice, Princeton (New Jersey) and Oxford (U.K.): Princeton University Press. ISBN 978-06-91113-47-0.
- Lee, Chi-ran. Chief Director, Haedong Younghan Academy. The Emergence of National Religions in Korea.
- Lee, Gyungwon (2016). An Introduction to New Korean Religions.Seoul: Moonsachul Publishing. ISBN 979-11-86853-16-0.
