= Hwanung =

Figure in Korean origin mythology

- Prince of Heaven
- Other names

Korean name
- Hangul: 환웅
- Hanja: 桓雄
- RR: Hwanung
- MR: Hwanung
- Venerated in: Daejongism
- Predecessor: Hwanin
- Successor: Tan'gun
- Artifacts: Three Heavenly Seals
- Gender: Male
- Ethnic group: Koreans

Genealogy
- Parents: Hwanin
- Consort: Ungnyeo
- Offspring: Tan'gun
- Dynasty: Gojoseon

Hwanung (Korean for the "Supreme Divine Regent") is an important figure in the mythological origins of Korea. He plays a central role in the story of Dangun Wanggeom (단군왕검/檀君王儉), the legendary founder of Gojoseon, the first kingdom of Korea. Hwanung is the son of Hwanin (환인; 桓因), the "Lord of Heaven". Along with his ministers of clouds, rain, and wind, he instituted laws and moral codes and taught the humans various arts, medicine, and agriculture.

== Legend ==
The Three Heavenly Seals. The bronze dagger, bronze mirror, and bronze bell.

According to the 'Dangun founding legend', Hwanung yearned to live on the earth among the valleys and the mountains. Hwanin permitted Hwanung and 3000 followers to depart and they descended from heaven to a sandalwood tree on Baekdu Mountain, then called Taebaek Mountain (태백산/太伯山). There Hwanung founded Sinsi (신시/神市, "City of God") and gave himself the title Heaven King. Hwanung also received the Three Heavenly Seals for descending from the heavens from his father.

In a cave near the sandalwood tree lived a bear and a tiger who came to the tree every day to pray to Hwanung. One day Hwanung gave the bear and the tiger twenty bulbs of garlic and some divine mugwort. Hwanung promised if they ate only his garlic and mugwort and stayed in the cave out of the sunlight for one hundred days he would make them human.

The tiger and the bear agreed and went back to the cave, but tiger was too hungry and impatient to wait, leaving the cave before the 100 days were done. But the bear remained, and on the 21st day was transformed into a beautiful woman, who gratefully honored Hwanung with offerings. With time the woman grew lonely, and prayed to Hwanung that she might have a child. So Hwanung made her his wife and gave her a son called Dangun, a name which has two meanings: "Altar Prince" and sandalwood. Dangun eventually founded Gojoseon.

== Popular culture ==
- Portrayed by Bae Yong-joon in the 2007 MBC TV series The Legend.

== See also ==
- Dangun
- Hwanin
- Gojoseon
