= Kim Gae-nam =

Donghak Revolution leader (1853–1895)

- Rebel leader Kim Gae-nam, also known as 'King Gae-nam'

Korean name
- Hangul: 김개남
- Hanja: 金開南
- RR: Gim Gaenam
- MR: Kim Kaenam

Courtesy name
- Hangul: 기선, 기범
- Hanja: 箕先, 箕範
- RR: Giseon, Gibeom
- MR: Kisŏn, Kibŏm

Childhood name
- Hangul: 김영주
- Hanja: 金永疇
- RR: Gim Yeongju
- MR: Kim Yŏngju

Kim Gae-nam (Korean: 김개남; 1853–1895) was a prominent figure in the Donghak Peasant Revolution in the late 19th century, and he served as the head of the Honam Changwi Office and other positions within the Donghak religious sect. He converted to Donghak around 1890 and played a significant role during the Samrye and Boeun gatherings, which led to his recognition as a leader. When the Donghak Peasant Revolution broke out in 1894, he assumed the position of the overall commander and became the central figure of the Donghak Peasant Army. During the northward advance after the Second Uprising, the Battle of Cheongju took place, and Kim Gaenam suffered a major defeat there. He was subsequently arrested and executed in January 1895.

== Early life ==
Kim Gae-nam was born in Jeongeup, North Jeolla Province, Joseon. His family's ancestral home was Dogang. His given name was Kim Youngju (金永疇), and he used the courtesy names Giseon (箕先) and Gibum (箕範). After getting married, he became a teacher at a village school in Imsil. In 1873, at the age of 21, he first heard Choi Je-u's teachings and developed an interest in Donghak.

== Converting to Donghak ==
In 1889, he officially joined Donghak and became an active member of the Donghak community. The egalitarian belief in equal rights for all, the concept of "people are heaven," which emphasizes human rights, and the vision of overturning the corrupt world attracted Kim Gae-nam to Donghak. He changed his name from Kim Gi-bum to Kim Gae-nam, which means "opening the south first," reflecting his aspiration for enlightenment. When Choi Si-hyeong visited Taein in 1891, Kim Gaenam warmly welcomed him into his home, providing him with clothing and showing him utmost respect. He showed exceptional interest in Donghak's Shicheonju faith and the concept of post-heavenly creation, and devoted himself to practice and missionary work, eventually becoming a Jeopju (a high-ranking position within Donghak). During this time, he established close relationships with prominent Jeopju figures in the Honam region, including Jeon Bong-jun, Son Hwa-jung, Kim Deok-myeong, and Choi Gyeong-seon.

In November 1892, when the Gyojo Shinwon Movement was initiated, Kim Gaenam participated along with other Jeopju leaders from Jeolla (Jeolla Province). In 1892, he demonstrated his leadership by leading instructors during the Gyojo Shinwon Movement in the Samrye area of Jeolla. As a result, he gained high reputation and became a prominent Donghak leader in the Honam region. In 1893, when thousands of Donghak disciples gathered at the Boeun assembly to protest for the welfare of the nation and the expulsion of foreigners, Kim Gaenam once again mobilized disciples from the Honam region and received the appointment of "Taeinpo Daejeopju" (a higher-ranking position within Donghak) by Choi Si-hyeong.

== Donghak Peasant Revolution ==
After the two protests ended without significant results and harsh oppression against Donghak disciples intensified across various regions, the hardline faction of Jeopju in the Namjeop region began seeking independent strategies. In early 1894, when Jeon Bong-jun led the Gobu Uprising, Kim Gaenam and Son Hwa-jung raised the Donghak army. In April, they established the Honam Changui Office, the headquarters of the Donghak movement, in Baeksan and appointed Jeon Bong-jun as the Dongdo Daejang (Commander-in-Chief), while Kim Gae-nam took the position of Chonggwanryeongju (Overall Commander). To capture Namwon, a strategic location between Jeollado and Gyeongsangdo, they mobilized a large army and entered the region. After entering Namwon, they actively expanded their influence. They seized control of Donghak organizations in the northeastern part of Jeolla, including Suchang, Yongdam, Geumsan, and Jangsu, and attempted to expand their sphere of influence to Hamyang and Anui in Gyeongsangdo. They continued to station in Namwon and governed Jeollajwado, pushing for political reforms.

=== Gobu Revolt ===
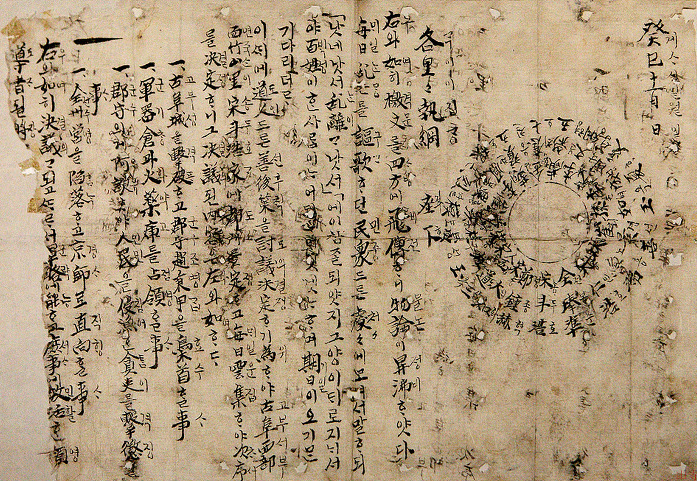
Sabal Tongmun code, made by twenty rebels of Jeongeup, Gobu, and Taein, including Kim Gae-nam

In 1894, when the harsh forced grain collection by Gobu Gunsu Jo Byeong-gap and the excessive water tax collection at Manseokbo caused resentment among the farmers, Kim Gaenam, Jeon Bong-jun, Son Hwa-jung, and others led the uprising. Jo Byeong-gap, who became Gobu Gunsu in 1892, mobilized the farmers without pay to build Manseokbo, even though there was a perfectly functional dam. After the completion of Manseokbo, he imposed excessive water taxes on the farmers who used the water from Manseokbo. Furthermore, he engaged in various corrupt practices, such as collecting money under the pretense of building a commemorative monument for his father. In January 1894, about 60 farmers gathered at Gobugwan Hall to protest against Gunsu Jo Byeong-gap's misdeeds and demanded reforms.

However, instead of addressing the farmers' demands, Jo Byeong-gap detained and subjected several people to severe beatings or expelled them. The anger of the farmers reached its peak, and on 14 February, with Jeon Bong-jun, Kim Gae-nam, Son Hwa-jung, and other Donghak followers at the forefront, over 1,000 farmers stormed into Gobugwan Hall. The peasant army illegally confiscated and returned the extorted water tax to the farmers and destroyed Manseokbo. On 15 February, Jo Byeong-gap was exiled, and Ahnhaeksa Yi Yong-tae, who came to quell the uprising, agreed to meet the demands of the Donghak peasant army. As a result, the Donghak peasant army voluntarily disbanded to restore order.

However, Ahnhaeksa Yi Yong-tae, under the pretext of identifying the instigators, arrested the farmers and committed various atrocities, such as looting their property. Jeolla Gamasa became obsessed with accumulating wealth and forced the Gobu people to join the Donghak movement, seizing their possessions. On 21 March 1894, the Donghak peasant army rose up again, unable to tolerate the tyranny of Ahnhaeksa and Jeolla Gamasa. Thousands of Donghak peasants gathered at armed strongholds led by Son Hwa-jung, relocating their base to Baeksan and Hwangtohyeon, with numerous farmers voluntarily joining.

=== Jeonju Fortress ===
After achieving victories in the Battle of Hwangtojae and the Battle of Hwangryong River, the Donghak Peasant Army peacefully entered Jeonju Fortress on 27 April. From early May, they faced attacks from government troops and suffered heavy losses, leading to defeat. The Donghak Peasant Army began to waver after a significant defeat in the Wanju Battle. As they became disillusioned, the farmers' spirits were lifted by the Nongbeon movement. Without the support of the Northern Expansion led by Choi Si-hyeong, and upon hearing news of the Qing and Japanese armies' participation, they decided to withdraw from Jeonju Castle. After capturing Jeonju Castle, the Donghak peasant army modified its goal of advancing to Hanyang to establish a new dynasty and instead retreated from Jeonju Castle under the condition that the government accept their reform proposal.

=== Second Uprising ===
In response to Japanese interference in Korean affairs following the First Sino-Japanese War, a second Donghak peasant uprising was initiated in September 1894 to drive out the Japanese. The Southern Jeob Army led by Jeon Bong-jun and the Northern Jeob Army led by Son Byeong-hui met in Samrye. A force of 100,000 to 200,000 Donghak peasants gathered, and they moved northward to recapture Hanyang.

Kim Gae-nam did not participate in the second uprising. He believed that establishing a classless country by advancing to Hanyang was more important, so he refrained from actively participating in the Second Donghak Peasant Uprising, which aimed to protect the Joseon Dynasty from foreign aggression.

On 9 October, before the Council of Samrye had reached its conclusion, there was a minor skirmish in Daejeon, at the time a small village called Hanbat, between rebels and governmental forces. This came to be called the Daejeon Massacre. Seventy-eight rebels gave 78 government soldiers alcohol, then killed them while drunk.

After staying in Namwon, he led 50,000 troops and entered Jeonju Castle on 16 October. He executed Namwon Busa Yi Yong-heon, who was designated as a pro-Japanese figure, and punished Gobu Gunsu Yang Pil-hwan and Suncheon Busa Lee Su-hong. The Donghak peasant army led by Jeon Bong-jun fought fiercely in places like Hwangtohyeon and Ugeumchi, but they continued to suffer defeats due to the overwhelming strength of government troops and the Japanese army, leading to their disintegration.

== Reorganization ==
After the disbandment of the Donghak Peasant Army, it was Kim Gaenam who first attempted the reorganization. Around October, he led a large army and entered Imsil through which they arrived in Jeonju. The officials in Jeonjugamyeong, including the Namwon Busa and Gobu Gunsu, were present for their appointment. Kim Gaenam did not hesitate to execute them. At the end of October, they sent troops from the surrounding areas to Geumsan and occupied the town. Once inside Geumsan, Kim Gaenam's army committed retaliatory acts of excessive violence. Due to such excessive behavior in each region they passed through, Kim Gaenam lost the support and goodwill of the people.

In November, Kim attempted to advance northward and occupied Jinjam-hyeon in Chungcheongdo.

=== Battle of Cheongju ===
The following day, they attacked Cheongju, engaging in fierce battles. Meanwhile, the city of Cheongju was the Donghak division commanded by the Great Jeobju, Son Cheonmin. Kim Gae-nam and Son Cheonmin cooperated to attack Cheongju in the Battle of Cheongju on 9 December 1894. Because Kim did not fight at Ugeumchi, his army of 25,000 was still strong. He began his attack only after the Battle of Ugeumchi, and by 9 December, he reached Cheongju Fortress.

Kim's opponent was Kuwabara Eiziro and his Japanese battalion, along with governmental troops with little morale. Kim Gaenam's army, which had marched a long distance, had some of its vanguard units approach Cheongju Castle. 15,000 men attacked from the South, while Son Cheonmin's 10,000 attacked from the North. The defenders of Cheongju lacked morale due to the Daejeon Massacre, and Kim nearly broke through the south door. Eiziro suddenly assaulted the rebels, and Kim retreated to Muneui, but was defeated again.

Two hundred rebels were killed in the Battle of Cheongju. The rebels also lost large amounts of weaponry, including many rebel banners, thousands of bows and arrows, 140 rifles, 2,000 flintlock muskets, 150 kilograms of gunpowder, two cannons, and 50 horses.

== Betrayal and death ==
Kim Gae-nam returned to Jeollado and was no longer able to maintain the momentum of his army. The exact details of how the army disbanded remain unclear. On 3 December 1894, Kim went into hiding, just as Jeon Bong-jun did, evaded government troops and took refuge in a wheat mill at Chorokbawi, near Jeonju South Gate.

On 8 January 1895, Kim had been betrayed by a friend named Yim Byeongchan and captured by 80 governmental soldiers who surrounded the house of Kim's brother-in-law with many people watching. Kim was dragged to Naju. On 13 December, he was put to death by beheading, and his corpse was ripped apart in five. The magistrate of Naju ate Kim's intestines and liver.

== See also ==
- Jeon Bong-jun
- Donghak Peasant Revolution
- Donghak
- Choe Si-hyeong
- Retreat from Gongju
