= Song Tŏkpong =

Korean poet (1521–1578)

- Hangul: 송덕봉
- Hanja: 宋德奉
- RR: Song Deokbong
- MR: Song Tŏkpong

Song Tŏkpong (Korean: 송덕봉; Hanja: 宋德奉; 1521–1578) was a Korean female poet of the mid Joseon period, and was active in the sixteenth century.

== Biography ==
Song Tŏkpong was born in 1521 to Song Chun and Lady Yi of the Hampyeong Yi clan into the Hongju Song clan (홍주 송씨) during the reign of King Jungjong.

She was later arranged to marry the Confucian scholar Yu Hŭich'un (유희춘; 柳希春) in 1536 as his second wife. The marriage produced one son and five daughters, but in 1547, Yu was exiled.

When he boasted of his faithfulness to her, she reprimanded him in letters by saying his boasting of such matters did not do him any credit. She furthermore let him know that she had diligently mourned his mother for three years and arranged the funeral, which she implied were much more difficult tasks than remaining faithful. She also commented that spending some months without sexual relations would have been good for him, seeing as he was getting older and needed to preserve his energy. He took her admonishment without rancor and they continued to correspond with each other in verse.

On her way to visit her husband in exile in Jongseong, Song Tŏkpong composed a much-praised poem whilst passing through an area called Macheonryeong.

She was seen as a virtuous woman writer.

== Family ==
- Father - Song Chun (송준; 宋駿; 1475 – ?)
- Mother - Lady Yi of the Hampyeong Yi clan (함평 이씨; 1471 – ?)
- Husband - Yu Hŭich'un (유희춘; 柳希春; 1513–1577)
- Issue
  - Son - Yu Kyŏngnyŏm (유경렴; 柳景濂; 6 February 1539 – ?)
  - Daughter - Lady Yu of the Seonsan Yu clan (선산 유씨; 1540 – ?)
  - Daughter - Yu Haesŏng (유해성; 柳海成), Lady Yu of the Seonsan Yu clan (선산 유씨; 1550 – ?)
  - Daughter - Yu Haebok (유해복), Lady Yu of the Seonsan Yu clan (선산 유씨; 1555 – ?)
  - Daughter - Yu Haemyŏng (유해명), Lady Yu of the Seonsan Yu clan (선산 유씨; 1560 – ?)
  - Daughter - Yu Haegwi (유해귀), Lady Yu of the Seonsan Yu clan (선산 유씨; 1565 – ?)

== Sources ==
- Lee, Hai-soo & Yi, Hye-sun (2005). The poetic world of classic Korean women writers. Ewha Womans University Press.
