= Retreat from Gongju =

Donghak Peasant Revolution conflict

- Part of Donghak Peasant Revolution
| Date | November 14th–28th, 1894 |
| Location | Chungcheong and Jeolla, Korea |
| Result | Alliances Victory |

Belligerents
| Donghak Peasant Army | Kingdom of Joseon: Joseon Army; Empire of Japan: Japanese Army |

Commanders and leaders
| Jeon Bong-jun; Kim Gae-nam; Son Byeong-hui; Kim Soon-gap; Kim Moon-haeng; Ryu Gong-wan | Yi Gyu-tae; Yi Du-hwang; Choi Yeong-hak; Major Morio; Minami Sozo |

Casualties and losses
| Massive | Minimal |

After the Battle of Ugeumchi, Jeon Bong-jun and his remaining forces retreated to Nonsan to rendezvous with Kim Gae-nam and the other Donghak peasants who were defeated by government and Japanese troops. Several battles took place where the Donghak Peasant Army fought against the allied forces of the Joseon Army and the Imperial Japanese Army who were in pursuit of them. The alliance defeated them and the Donghak Peasant Army retreated to Jeonju Fortress which they abandoned for Wonpyeong and Taein to make their final resistance. The Battle of Taein was the most prominent battle during their retreat where after their defeat, Jeon Bong-jun disbanded the Donghak Peasant Army, marking the end of the Donghak Peasant Revolution.

== Retreat to Nonsan ==
Jeon Bong-jun, after the defeat at Ugeumchi withdrew to Gyeongcheon, reorganized his forces, and prepared a counterattack for the assault on Gongju. However, the losses at Ugeumchi were too great, forcing him to abandon the counterattack and decide to retreat to Nonsan after a day's rest. On the 13th, Jeon Bong-jun descended to Nonseong through a banner and stationed his troops on Bonghwasan in Yeoju County. The army had about 2,500 soldiers. While staying in Nonseong, the Donghak Peasant Army attempted to regroup and recover its formation. They issued a mild letter called the "Gosimun" written in Hangul, through Dongdochang's name, on November 12, to inform the military, civilians, and scholars about their determination to repel foreign forces and achieve peace.

== Battle of Nonsan ==
The Donghak Peasant Army, consisting of Jeon Bong-jun and Kim Gae-nam's forces, faced attacks from pursuing government and Japanese forces at various locations in Nonsan such as Yeonsan, Daemuryeong, Mt. Soto in Eunjin, and Hwanghwadae.

=== Battle of Yeonsan ===
While regrouping the Donghak Peasant Army in Nonsan, rumors spread that the Japanese Army had entered Yeonsan, which is adjacent to Nonsan in the east. Although the Donghak Peasant Army had retreated from Gongju, they planned to repel the Japanese Army in Yeonsan after reorganizing. Yeonsan was an important strategic point located on the road from Nonsan to Boeun. With Son Byeong-hui's Hoseo Donghak Army, which had suffered relatively less damage, as the core force, the Donghak Peasant Army united with the Honam Donghak Army and headed towards Yeonsan.

The Japanese Army that entered Yeonsan was the Churobunjin-dae, a reserve infantry unit belonging to the 19th Reserve Infantry Regiment that was dispatched from Japan for the extermination of the Donghak Army. The Churobunjin-dae was commanded by Lieutenant Minami Sojo, the deputy commander of the 19th Reserve Infantry Regiment. They were engaged in battles with the Donghak Peasant Army in Mungyeong and Jeungsan, and could not participate in the Battle of Ugeumchi. Minami changed his course in Okcheon and arrived in Yeonsan via Geumsan and Jinsan. The intention was to attack the Donghak Peasant Army from the rear together with Moriō, who had stationed in Gongju and defeat the Donghak Peasant Army. Kim Gaenam's Donghak Peasant Army regrouped in Jinjam after the defeat in the Battle of Cheongju on November 13, and engaged in a battle with the Japanese and Government Army in Yeonsan at around 11 a.m. on the 14th. The troops under Jeon Bong-jun, who were stationed on Mount Bonghwa in Nohseong, moved to Nonsan on the afternoon of the 14th.

On the afternoon of the 14th, the battle began when the Japanese Army entered the eastern district of Yeonsan and encountered thousands of Donghak Peasant Army members gathered at the fortress. The contents of the Battle of Yeonsan are recorded as follows in the "Yakryeok" by Im Dong-ho:

On the night of that day, a report came that 150 Japanese soldiers had entered Yeonsan. The next day, in the morning, while leading tens of thousands of Donghak Peasant Army members, you met each other at Donggu while marching towards Yeonsan. A battle broke out, and the official army was repelled, allowing entry into Yeonsan-eup. Immediately, messengers were sent to Yeonsan-eup to summon all the people of Joseon and launch a fire attack to annihilate the official army. They marched to Nonsan and joined forces with Jeon Bong-jun's unit.

They climbed up the mountains surrounding the town, holding hundreds of flags to signal the positions of cannons, and drove the Japanese Army towards Yeonsan-eup. The Donghak Peasant Army occupied Hwangsanseong, a strategic point at an elevation of 264 meters northwest of Yeonsan-eup. Hwangsanseong overlooked the plains of Yeonsan and Nonsan, making it a crucial strategic location. The Donghak Peasant Army fired upon the Japanese Army from Hwangsanseong.

Minami Sojo, who had entered Yeonsan overwhelmed by the rebels, divided his troops into two directions. One platoon, led by Soi Myebara, attacked the enemy from the front mountain, while other units were assigned to the left, right, and rear. At noon, Minami ordered two platoons to attack the enemy's rear, and they launched a joint attack from both sides around 2 a.m. The startled Donghak Peasant Army resisted the Japanese forces persistently until 4:40 p.m. Despite being pressed by the tactics and weapons of the Japanese army, the Donghak Peasant Army evacuated Hwangsanseong at 5 p.m. and retreated towards Noseong, Eun-jin, and Nonsan.

Kim Soon-gap, who led the Donghak Peasant Army from Hwangsanseong in Yeonsan, was captured alive. Kim Soon-gap, around 40 years old, held the position of commander appointed by Jeon Bong-jun as the vanguard. According to the Japanese army's battle report, the Donghak Peasant Army suffered significant casualties, with 50 deaths and an unknown number of injuries. The Osaka Shinbun, published in Japan, reported that hundreds of Donghak Peasant Army members had died. The records of the Donghak Peasant Army massacre in the Japanese military battle reports were intentionally minimized. Based on subsequent records indicating that Kim Soon-gap died in battle, it is presumed that he was executed shortly after his capture. In this battle, one Japanese soldier was killed, making him the first casualty of the Japanese army in the numerous battles with the Donghak Peasant Army since the landing of the 19th Reserve Infantry Regiment in Incheon. Although the Japanese army massacred the Donghak Peasant Army countless times, the number of casualties on the Donghak side was relatively small.

=== Nonseong Massacre ===
Immediately after the Battle of Yeonsan, the Japanese army, along with the 19th Infantry Battalion's pursuit unit, the Metropolitan Guards (Tongwiyeong), and Royal Escort Palace Guard detachments pursued the Donghak Peasant Army as they retreated to Nonsan. This pursuit battle was carried out at the urging of Chungcheong Governor Park Je-sun, who relayed the information gathered by the reconnaissance team on November 14 to Major Morio of the Japanese army. According to the report from the reconnaissance team, "Jeon Bong-jun's forces are stationed near Noseong, showing signs of preparing to attack Gongju." Upon receiving this information, Major Morio led a Japanese platoon and 200 soldiers from the Metropolitan Guards to pursue the Donghak Peasant Army towards Noseong, but the Donghak Peasant Army had already moved to Nonsan.

The Royal Escort Palace Guards (Jangwiyeong) detachment and Japanese army, led by Yi Du-hwang, and Yi Gyu-tae, pursued and attacked the retreating Hyukmyeong Army. The Donghak peasants, who repeatedly retreated, began to be ruthlessly massacred by the Japanese and government forces. Jeon Bong-jun and Son Byeong-hui appealed for cooperation between the Donghak Army and the government forces to drive out the Japanese army, but their request was rejected. The "Sunmu Advance Vanguard Registration" record states, "They scattered in all directions and were pursued and arrested, and as each unit arrested them, they were mostly executed." It describes the situation at the time. Meanwhile, the main forces of the Japanese army and the Metropolitan Guards proceeded directly from Yeonsan to Nonsan, towards Mt. Soto, where the Donghak Peasant Army was stationed.

=== Ambush at Mt. Soto ===
The peasant army stationed at Mt. Soto, was ambushed by the Japanese army and government forces. The Metropolitan Guard detachment attacked the right side of Mt. Soto, while the Japanese army launched attacks from the front and left. The surprise attack, which began at 2 p.m., lasted for an hour and a half, during which the Donghak Peasant Army fought back but eventually retreated to the Hwanghwadae.

=== Battle of Hwanghandae ===
Hwanghwadae stood alone in the middle of a vast courtyard, surrounded by dense mountain slopes, with a flat and wide peak in the center. It was naturally fortified, resembling a strong fortress enclosed by cliffs on all sides. However, despite this advantageous terrain, the Donghak Peasant Army could not withstand the attacks led by Major Morio. Morio divided his forces into three sides, attacking from all directions, confusing the Donghak Peasant Army. Then, the main force of the Japanese army attacked from the front and climbed up to Hwanghwadae. The Donghak Peasant Army, who had been staunchly resisting the frontal assault of the Japanese army, lost morale when about 20 rebels fell in battle. Around 4 p.m., they were rescued by Kim Gae-nam's peasant army. Jeon Bong-jun issued a retreat order, and the Donghak Peasant Army scattered and retreated southward into Jeolla Province and joined forces in Jeonju. Some attempted to escape with resistance but fell into a trap set by the Minbo Army. Yi Gyu-tae, who stood at the vanguard, reported, "We advanced along Route 3 and ambushed the Donghak Army under Mt. Noseong and pursued them to Nonsan-Daechon. We then sent Yun Seon-yeong to Eunjin Hwanghwadae, where we killed around 300 bandits."

== Evacuation to Wonpyeong ==
After the defeat in the Battle of Nonsan, the Donghak Peasant Army was crumbling before the superior weapons of the Japanese army and government forces. Kim Gae-nam and Jeon Bong-jun joined forces in Nonsan on the night of the 14th. In Nonsan, the units of Jeon Bong-jun and Kim Gae-nam, as well as Son Byeong-hui's unit, gathered together. Before Kim Gae-nam's unit joined, the peasant army had diminished to about 2,500 members from the initial 10,000 to 40,000 during the Battle of Ugeumchi on the 14th. After Kim Gae-nam's arrival on the 15th, the number increased to about 3,000. The peasant army under Kim Gae-nam, which had reached around 8,000 members when advancing northward from Namwon, had dwindled to only about 500 members. Leading about 1,000 peasants, Jeon Bong-jun, Son Byeong-hui, and Kim Gae-nam retreated to Jeolla on November 18 and arrived at Jeonju Fortress on November 19. They attempted to resist based on Jeonju Fortress, however, due to insufficient provisions, they left Jeonju Castle on the night of November 22 and moved to Geumgu Wonpyeong. The Donghak Peasant Army reorganized its forces starting from the 23rd. Jeon Bong-jun and Kim Gae-nam acted together until Jeonju, where they gathered the dispersed peasant army and prepared for the final resistance. They left Jeonju on the 23rd, with Jeon Bong-jun's unit heading towards Gobu, Geumgu, and Taein, and Kim Gae-nam's unit heading towards Namwon. Jeon Bong-jun's unit consisted of at least 6,000 to 7,000 members. The peasant army led by Jeon Bong-jun arrived at Wonpyeong on the 25th and set up camp.

Wonpyeong was a stronghold of Kim Deok-myeong, a major figure in the Donghak movement in Honam. Wonpyeong was a base for the Donghak movement in Honam to the extent that Donghak followers from Jeolla Province gathered and held rallies when the Gyojo Shinwon Movement unfolded in Boeun. In front of Gumiran Village, where the Donghak Peasant Army stayed, the Wonpyeong River flowed, and Wonpyeongjang was a key transportation point where local goods were concentrated. Jeon Bong-jun and Son Byeong-hui, who joined from Nonsan, accompanied the Donghak Peasant Army to Wonpyeong. When the Donghak Peasant Army, which had reached a strength of 30,000 with the combined forces of Honam and Hoseo, entered Jeonju, it consisted of only 500 people due to repeated defeats. However, after gathering in Wonpyeong, the Donghak Peasant Army in the Honam region grew from a few thousand to 10,000 people. Nevertheless, the morale of the Donghak Peasant Army was not very high due to successive defeats.

== Battle of Wonpyeong ==
On the morning of November 25, the Donghak Peasant Army was ambushed by the Central Route Division (Jungro Division, 중로분진대), which had a battalion headquarters instead of a separate division. They had passed through Cheongju, engaged in battles in Munwi and Jeungryak, crossed Geumsan, fought in the Yeonsan Gosan battle, and entered Wonpyeong. The detailed report of Captain Yi Jin-ho (李軫鎬), who was serving under the Japanese army at that time, provides a comprehensive account of the battle situation:

On the 24th of that day, the commanding officer Choi Yeong-hak, along with one unit of military police and one unit of Japanese soldiers, marched and arrived at Geumgu-eup, where they spent the night. Then, on the 25th, in the early morning between 5 and 7 a.m., they continued their march and soon arrived at Wonpyeong. Upon hearing the sound of a trumpet, tens of thousands of enemy troops spread out in a triangular formation, resembling the shape of a bottle. They positioned themselves at a distance of one thousand steps from each other. From around 9 a.m. to 4 p.m., they engaged in a gunfight, where the roar was like thunder, and bullets flew like rain. The enemy was positioned on the mountains, while our military forces were in the fields. War cries echoed from all directions, and the flames and smoke created a fog that made it difficult to distinguish the details. At that moment, the commanding officer Choi Yeong-hak drew his sword, took the lead, climbed up the mountain, and commanded the battle. With a powerful shout, the troops divided themselves into east and west, exerting their strength to fight. They charged forward and stabbed or beheaded the enemy, resulting in the death of 37 enemies. The remaining enemy forces scattered in all directions and fled individually. The terrain was steep and treacherous, the sun was already setting, and furthermore, it was difficult to identify the enemy's movements because when they were dispersed, they resembled ordinary peasants. Therefore, it was not possible to chase and kill each one individually.

According to the report by Sunbong Yi Gyu-tae, it is stated, "Successive fires engulfed over 40 shops and dye houses in the Wonpyeong market, and numerous grain stores and belongings of the villagers, totaling several hundred homes, were completely burned, which is extremely distressing and tragic." This reveals that the entire Wonpyeong area turned into ashes. The local forces, perceiving that the villagers were aiding the Donghak Peasant Army, set fire to many homes during the battle.

The Donghak Peasant Army, filling Gumi-ran's rear mountain across the Wonpyeong River, counterattacked. When the Japanese army and the military police attacked from the east and west, the Donghak Peasant Army fiercely fought back, resulting in the death of 37 members. With so many casualties, the Donghak Peasant Army decided to retreat.

The government and Japanese forces captured 60 muskets, 7 barrels of lead bullets, 5 chests of gunpowder, 500 sacks of rice, 3,000 nyang of coins, 10 pieces of wood, 2 cattle, 11 horses, 10 cowhides, 1 tiger skin, 2 baskets of clothes, ten matchlock guns, ten cannons, two hundred spears, ten rolls of cotton cloth, two cows, eleven horses, ten pieces of iron leather, and one set of armor. Among the captured items, the notable one was the iron and leather, which was used for cooking outdoors by the Donghak Peasant Army. Its inclusion in the spoils of the Battle of Wonpyeong indicates that the Donghak Peasant Army actually used it.

== Battle of Taein ==
After the defeat in the Battle of Wonpyeong, the Donghak Peasant Army immediately retreated to Taein which was their headquarters at the time, and joined forces with the Donghak Peasant Army that had encamped here. Son Byeong-hui's Hoseo Donghak Army separated from Jeon Bong-jun's unit. In the midst of successive defeats by the government forces and the Japanese army, Ui-am, in order to preserve the existence of the Donghak sect, reached an agreement with Jeon Bong-jun to separate the Donghak Peasant Armies in Honam and Hoseo. The Hoseo Donghak Peasant Army, led by Ui-am, departed from Imsil in Jeolla Province, where they had been observing the progress of the Donghak Revolution since the resurgence in September, to meet in Haewol. They set up camp on three mountains, including Mt. Seonghwang, Hangasan, and Dorisan, on November 27. At that time, the peasant army led by Jeon Bong-jun, Kim Moon-haeng, and Ryu Gong-wan consisted of around 8,000 members, while the government forces numbered 230 and the Japanese forces numbered 40.

According to the "Diary of the Right Vanguard of the Yangho" (Yangho Uiseonbong Ilgi), the government forces numbered 230, the Japanese army had 60 soldiers, and the Donghak Peasant Army was estimated to be around 5,000. The Donghak Peasant Army had set up camp at Seonghwangsan, Hangasan, and Dorisan. The government forces and the Japanese army divided into two groups and launched attacks on Hangasan and Dorisan. The government forces, led by Daegwan Yoon Hui-yeong with 90 soldiers, and the Japanese army with 30 soldiers, attacked from the western path. Daegwan Yoon Gyu-sik led 140 government soldiers, accompanied by 30 Japanese soldiers, and attacked from the eastern path.

The Battle of Taein lasted for about 12 hours from 10 a.m. until 8 p.m. on November 27. After several hours of battle, the Japanese army and the government forces conquered the two mountains, while the Donghak Peasant Army fiercely resisted and gathered at Seonghwangsan. Approximately 700 to 800 homes were burned down. The government forces and the Japanese army descended and divided into two groups to attack Seonghwangsan once again. After a few hours, the Donghak Peasant Army, despite engaging in combat from advantageous terrain, could not withstand the frontal assault by the Japanese army and the government forces. In this battle, 40 members of the Donghak Peasant Army were killed, and 50 were captured and executed. Kim Mun-haeng, Yu Gong-man, and Mun Haeng-min were also captured. Around 450 members were captured and about 340 members were killed. They suffered a major defeat, losing 15 Huirong guns, over 200 muskets, and numerous ammunition, bayonets, and 6 horses. Jeon retreated to Gobu and Namwon.

== Aftermath ==
After the Battle of Taein, Jeon Bong-jun gathered the peasant army once again but couldn't muster the strength to engage in further battles. The Donghak Revolution, which had shaken the entire nation starting from the Gobu uprising, came to an end on a grand scale.

The Donghak Peasant Army continued to retreat southward, and most of their forces disbanded, with no remaining troops capable of preventing pursuit from the Japanese army and government forces. However, the 19th Infantry Battalion, led by Minami Sozo, relentlessly pursued and conducted search and kill operations against the Donghak Peasant Army until the end. Alongside the Japanese army, the Left Vanguard led by Yi Gyu-tae and the Right Vanguard led by Yi Du-hwang, as well as the Military Police under Yi Jin-ho, carried out one-sided pacification operations. In response, scattered resistance persisted in Jangheung, Hampyeong, Gangjin, Muan, Haenam, and other areas until the following year's lunar month.

On 28 November 1894, Jeon formally dissolved the Donghak Army and ordered the Donghak peasants to scatter. The rebels cried: "We thought Jeon Nokdu (Jeon's nickname) would save us, but now we are all going to die". Jeon answered: "War is a game of luck. Why is it that you blame me". He then dressed up as a peasant and headed east. Jeon himself was hanged in March, 1895.

== See also ==
- Donghak Peasant Revolution
- Battle of Ugeumchi
- Joseon Army (late 19th century)
- Jeon Bong-jun
- Kim Gae-nam
- Son Byeong-hui

== Sources ==
- Yi, Guytae (1894). Diary of the Reconnaissance Head of the South (in Korean).
