= Battle of Hwangryong River =

Donghak Peasant Revolution conflict

- Part of Donghak Peasant Revolution
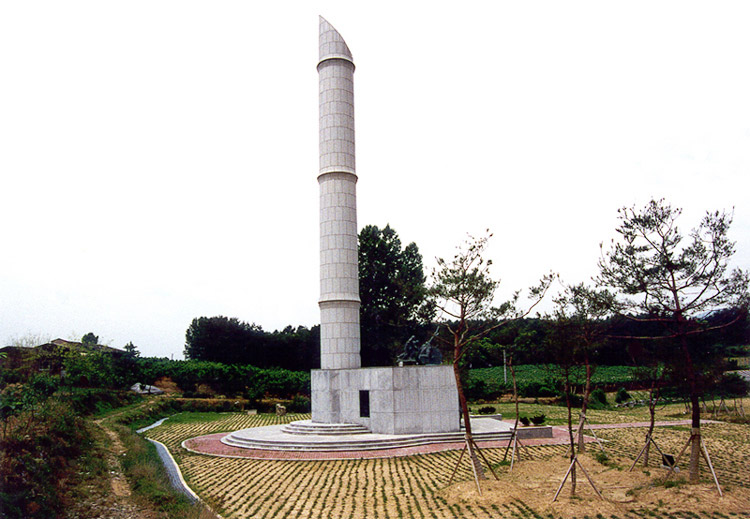
- Historic Site No. 406: Battle of Jangseong Hwangryong (Jangseong Hwangryong Battle)
Date	April 22–23, 1894
Location	Hwangryong River, Jangseong, South Jeolla, Korea
Result	Rebel Victory

Belligerents
Donghak Peasant Army	Kingdom of Joseon: Joseon Army

Commanders and leaders
Jeon Bong-jun; Yi Bangeon	Hong Gye-hun; Lee Hak-seung †

Strength
7,000	800

Casualties and losses
2	300

The Battle of Jangseong Hwangryong River (Korean: 장성 황룡촌 전투), or the Battle of Hwangryong River, was an 1894 conflict in Korea between the Donghak Peasant Army and Hong Gye-hun's army. During the journey from Yeonggwang, Hampyeong, and Muan to Jangseong, the Donghak Peasant Army, which had been advancing triumphantly everywhere they went, finally encountered Hong Gye-hoon's military forces that had chased after them and engaged in a battle in Jangseong.

== Background ==
The Donghak Peasant Army, which rose up with the goal of "exterminating violence and saving the people" and resisting foreign aggression, voluntarily attacked government officials after the Baeksan Revolt on March 29, 1894. By thoroughly defeating the government forces at the Battle of Hwangtojae on April 6-7, they quickly swept through the Honam region within a month.

Upon hearing this news, the government appointed Hong Gye-hun, a soldier from Jeolla, as the "Commander of Suppression for the Jeolla and Gyeongsang Provinces" (양호초토사 (兩湖招討使)) and dispatched 800 troops to suppress the Donghak Peasant Army. Hong Gye-hun, who was staying in Yeonggwang, received a report from Kwon Pung-sik, the county magistrate of Hampyeong, stating that the Donghak Peasant Army was heading from Hampyeong to Naju and Jangseong. On April 22, he sent 300 soldiers under the command of officers Lee Hak-seung, Won Se-rok, and Oh Geon-yeong from Daegwan to Jangseong. On April 23, two days after the peasant army set up camp in Jangseong Wolpyeong-ri River, Hong Gye-hun arrived in Jangseong. He made Lee Hak-seung, Won Se-rok, and Oh Geon-young, who were in charge, understand the sympathy of the peasant army.

On 17 April, however, Jeon Bong-jun and his army of 7,000 turned south to Yeonggwang, where Hong Gye-hun's governmental troops were waiting. Jeon attempted to lure the troops to Jangseong, and the general Yi Hakseung chased after them.

== Battle ==
On April 22, Seonbong Lee Hak-seung gathered at Hwangryonggang and launched a preemptive attack on the peasant army. The Donghak Peasant Army, which had marched from Hampyeong to Jangseong, was having lunch in Wolpyeong-ri when they were unexpectedly shelled by government forces. Around 40-50 people were killed, turning the scene into chaos.

On April 23rd, Hong issued an operational order to attack the Donghak Peasant Army, which was stationed in Hwangryong River. The peasant army, who suffered casualties from a surprise attack, quickly climbed up Sambong and prepared for the battle. However, the peasant army, seeing that the government forces were outnumbered compared to their own, launched a counterattack. Despite the disadvantageous conditions of the close proximity between the two camps and the heavy casualties they were willing to accept, the government forces, who had received modern training, could not retreat from the fierce assault of the Donghak Peasant Army.

Although the peasant army had experienced battles against the Jeolla Provincial Army in Hwangtohui, fighting against the elite troops of Joseon was a first for them. The military forces were heavily armed with the latest equipment such as Krupp guns imported from abroad, gatling guns, and Mauser rifles. Although the peasant army strengthened their armaments by taking possession of weapons from local armies as they occupied each village, their traditional weapons were much inferior in performance compared to the military forces' weapons. However, the peasant army, who thoroughly understood the terrain and topography of Hwangryonggang in Jangseong, launched a formation resembling the hanja "學" on the summit of Sambong and began to attack the military forces.

The rebel leader Yi Bangeon envisioned a new strategy. The rebels ran downhill rolling thousands of Jangtae, or chicken cages. The peasant army would stuff straw into the jangtae, set it on fire, and roll hundreds of them towards the military forces, depleting their firepower. Afterward, the peasant army would follow closely behind and attack the military forces as they approached. The "Ogahimun" describes the jangtae as follows:

The enemy looked down at the military forces from above and suddenly pushed out a large bamboo-made cylinder. There were dozens of them, resembling round chicken coops. On the outside, spears and swords were stuck in them like hedgehogs, and they had two wheels attached underneath, sliding down smoothly. The military forces fired bullets, arrows, and rocks, but they were all blocked by the bamboo cylinders. The enemy shot their guns from behind the bamboo cylinders and then charged forward, shouting. The government forces, observing from afar, did not come to their aid and allowed them to escape in all directions.

The Jangtae blocked most bullets, thus rendering the government's superior weapons useless. Moreover, Jeon placed the rebel army so that they would divide Yi Hakseung's troops into three separate divisions. Yi Hakseung ordered the troops to use their cannons, but they did not work because the pro-rebel villagers had put water inside the cannons (following the incident, rumours spread throughout the government forces that a ghost had destroyed the cannons). Taking advantage of their confusion, the peasant army launched a fierce attack from behind.

The indomitable spirit and courage of the peasant army, who had already faced death, remained unshaken even in the face of the modern weapons possessed by the military forces. The military forces retreated towards Yeonggwang, engaging in their final battle with the peasant army at the Nungsan Mountain in Sinchon-ri. It was here that Lee Hak-seung, the leader of the government forces, fell in battle.

Hong Gye-hun's government forces, composed of well-trained soldiers and elite units armed with modern weapons, were chased by the charging Donghak Peasant Army, even at the cost of their lives. They fled towards Yeonggwang, reaching a hill behind the Sinho-ri village about 5 li away. During this time, officer Lee Hak-seung fought to the end with the Donghak Army from the rear but was killed and lost important weapons. The reputation of the government forces plummeted, and their soldiers lost morale.

== Aftermath ==
In this battle, the peasant army killed Lee Hak-seung and five soldiers around him, and more than 300 governmental forces, but only two rebels died in battle. They achieved a great victory by pursuing the retreating government forces for about 30 li and achieved a notable feat by capturing one "Hoesun Gonggwanpo, one Krupp-style artillery, one gatling gun, and over 100 rifle. On the other hand, the government forces, with the loss of their leader, completely lost their morale and fled towards Yeonggwang. The peasant army, which had previously been perceived by the government forces as an unruly mob, had now become an opponent they could no longer underestimate. The bravery of the peasant army spread throughout the country whenever they clashed with the government forces, and the Donghak Peasant Army became legendary, with stories circulating that they possessed a talisman that made them immune to bullets or that they wouldn't die even if they were shot.

=== Analysis ===
The Battle of Jangseong Hwangryong River was the first confrontation between the peasant army and the trained government forces, and the peasant army's decisive victory brought a new phase to the development of the peasant uprising. Firstly, the fact that they defeated the government forces dispatched by the king brought significant progress to the consciousness of the peasant army. "When the Donghak followers first joined forces with the refugees... they could not openly confront the government forces," and even recently in Hampyeong, the peasant army showed a reserved attitude towards directly attacking the king, saying, "These soldiers are people who came down under our Lord's command, so we cannot resist the soldiers of corrupt officials. If we engage in a fight, we will not be able to escape the charge of rebellion." However, through the Battle of Jangseong, they found an opportunity to overcome such consciousness. The Donghak Army had prepared dozens of large bamboo-made "jangtae" in advance, which were rolled down from the mountaintop and used for shooting. The person who made these jangtae cages was a local blacksmith named Lee Bang-yeon from Jangheung, so he was called "Lee Jangtae." Following the victory in the battle, the peasant army "began to take the king's forces lightly and hurriedly reached Jeonju." Secondly, with the addition of the peasant army from Jeolla Province just before the Battle of Jangseong, a powerful peasant army unit was formed, consisting of both local peasants and refugees. With this overwhelming force, they were able to achieve their ultimate goal of capturing Jeonju.

== Advancing to Jeonju ==
After defeating the government forces and their leader Lee Hak-seung in Hwangryongchon, the victorious peasant army's morale was soaring. A royal messenger came to Jeon with bribes to quell the rebellion. Jeon killed the messenger, but took the needed money. With the captured cannons and firearms from the Jangseong battle, the Donghak Peasant Army moved north, and they advanced towards Jeonju, the largest city in Jeolla province at the time instead of choosing to take Naju to the south.

On April 24th, the peasant army, which had departed from Jangseong, passed through Jeongeup and stayed overnight in Taein. On the following day, the 25th, they arrived in Wonpyeong. At this location, they happened to arrest Lee Ju-ho, a propagandist who had come down from Seoul with ten thousand nyang of silver to support the government forces, along with two of his subordinates. Prior to this, they had brought the royal seal and were captured in Jangseong, and they were executed at the Wonpyeong market along with officials such as Yi Hak-eung and Bae Eun-hwan. On the next day, the 26th, upon receiving information that the government forces were chasing from behind, the peasant army immediately advanced towards Jeonju. Instead of taking the route towards Geumgu, where Geumgu Hyunaga is located, the peasant army turned right towards Wonpyeong. They did not choose the main road but took a somewhat treacherous shortcut by crossing Dokbaejae, and arrived at Samcheon, right in front of Jeonju Castle, where they spent the night on the 26th. The Jeonju forces were waiting for them with anticipation, right in front of the peasant army, who had pitched their camp at Samcheon, with their high morale. Hong Gye-hun quickly returned north, beginning the Siege of Jeonju Fortress.

== See also ==
- Donghak Peasant Revolution
- Jeon Bong-jun
- Hong Gye-hun

== Specific books ==
- Yi, Yihwa (2012). 동학농민운동(평등과 자주를 외친) [The Donghak Peasant Revolution: Claiming for Equality and Statehood] (in Korean). illustrated by Kim Tae-hyun. Seoul: Safari. p. 327. ISBN 9788-9648-0765-1.
- Gwak, Eunju (2011). 최제우 동경대전(만화)(서울대선정 인문고전 50선 21) [Choe Jeu's Donggyeong Daejeon (Manhwa)] (in Korean). Junior Kim Yeongsa. pp. 1–215. ISBN 9788-9349-3327-4.
