= Tonghak Peasant Revolution =

1894–1895 rebellion in Korea

- Part of 19th-century peasant rebellions in Korea
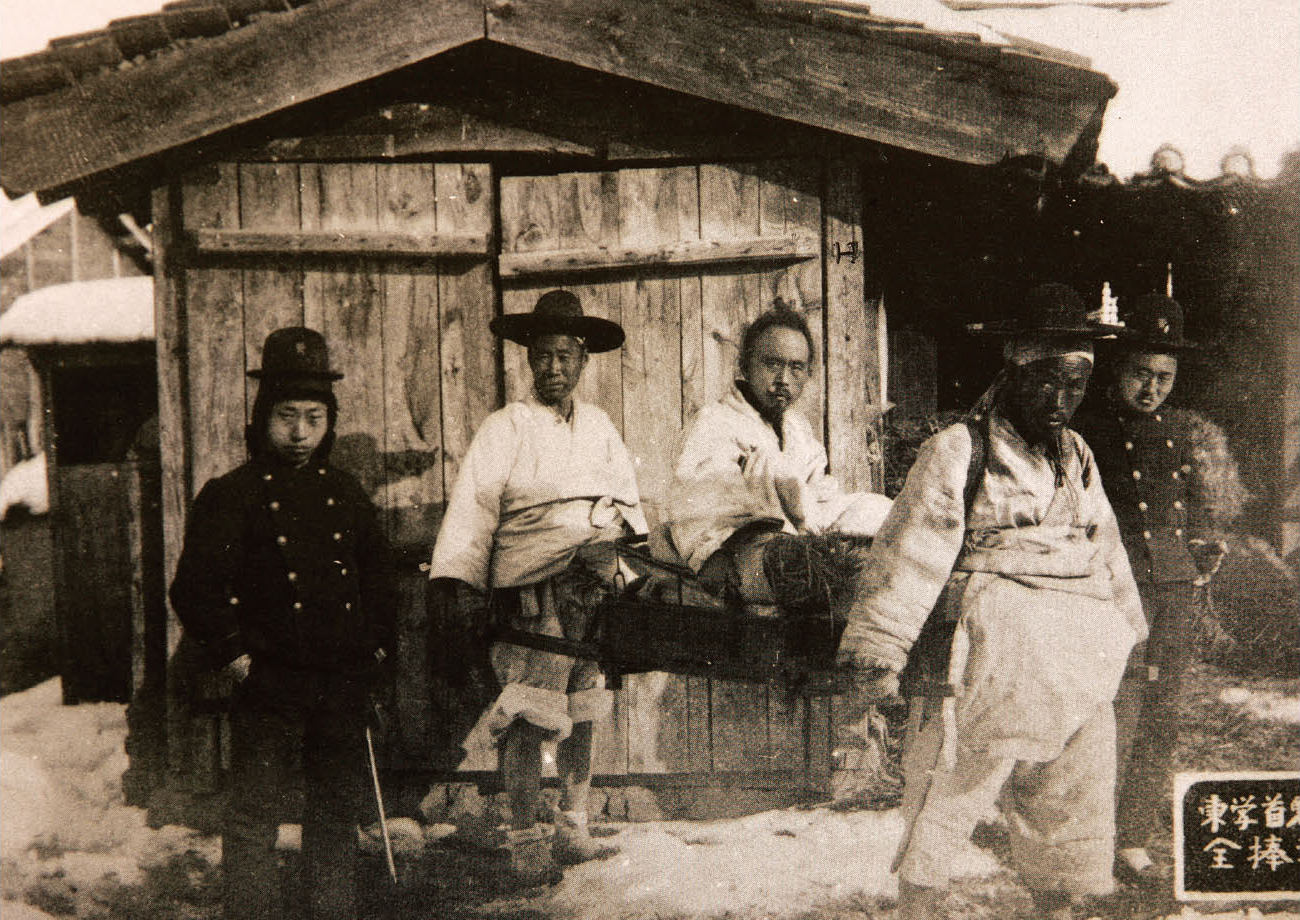
Date	11 January 1894 – 25 December 1895
Location	Joseon
Result	Suppressed
Territorial changes	Japanese occupation of various parts of Joseon

Belligerents
Joseon; Qing dynasty	Donghak	Japan

Commanders and leaders
King Gojong; Queen Min X; Yi Yongtae; Hong Gye-hun †; Yi Hakseung; Gu Sangjo; Seong Hayeong; Jang Yongjin; Yi Gidong; Yi Gyutae; Guangxu Emperor; Li Hongzhang; Ye Zhichao; Wei Rugui (executed); Ma Yukun	Jeon Bongjun (executed); Kim Gae-nam (executed); Son Hwajung; Choe Gyeongseon; Kim Deokmyeong; Choe Sihyeong; Son Byong-hi; Kim Heung Seob	Emperor Meiji; Yamagata Aritomo; Itō Sukeyuki; Kawakami Soroku; Nogi Maresuke; Oshima Yoshimasa

Strength
3,000–50,000 Korean soldiers	15,000–300,000 Southern Jeob rebels 10,000–300,000 Northern Jeob rebels	500–3,000 Japanese soldiers

Casualties and losses
6,000 Korean soldiers killed	Tens to hundreds of thousands killed from both Jeobs	200 Japanese soldiers killed

- Tonghak Peasant Revolution
- Hangul: 동학 농민 혁명
- Hanja: 東學農民革命
- RR: Donghak nongmin hyeongmyeong
- MR: Tonghak nongmin hyŏngmyŏng

The Tonghak Peasant Revolution (Note: Also known as the "Donghak Peasant Movement" (동학 농민 운동; 東學農民運動; donghak nongmin undong), the "Donghak Rebellion", the "Peasant Revolt of 1894", and the "Gabo Peasant Revolution".) (Korean: 동학 농민 혁명) took place between 11 January 1894 and 25 December 1895 in Korea. The peasants were primarily followers of Donghak, a Neo-Confucian movement that rejected Western technology and ideals.

The Revolution began in the province of Gobu-gun. In the early 1890s, Jo Byeong-gap, nominated magistrate of the gun in 1892, enforced harsh, oppressive policies upon the local peasant population. Correspondingly, in March 1894, a group of peasants led by Jeon Bong-jun and Kim Gae-nam began an uprising against local authorities. The initial revolt was suppressed under Yi Yong-tae, and Jeon Bong-jun fled to nearby Taein. Jeon gathered an army in Mount Paektu and recaptured Gobu in April. The rebels then defeated governmental forces in the Battle of Hwangtojae and the Battle of the Hwangryong River. Jeon then captured Jeonju Fortress and fought in a siege against Hong Gye-hun's government forces. In May, the rebels agreed on a truce through the Treaty of Jeonju. However, an unstable peace continued throughout the summer.

The alarmed government requested the Qing dynasty for military intervention, to which the Qing responded with a deployment of 2,700 soldiers. Angered that the Qing government had not informed them before intervening (as promised in the Convention of Tientsin), Japan started the First Sino-Japanese War. The war resulted in an expulsion of Chinese influence in Korea and also signaled an end to the Self-Strengthening Movement in China itself.

Growing Japanese dominance in the Korean Peninsula caused anxiety amongst the rebels. From September to October, the Southern and Northern leaders negotiated the plans for the future in Samrye. On 12 October, a coalition army of Northern and Southern Jeobs was formed, and the army, numbering 25,000–200,000 (records differ), attacked Gongju. After several battles, the rebel army was decisively defeated in the Battle of Ugeumchi, and the rebels were again overthrown in the Battle of Taein. Hostility continued deep into the spring of 1895. The rebel leaders were captured in various locations in the Honam Region, and most were executed by a mass hanging in March.

== Background ==
During the late 19th century, Korean society faced various social problems such as inequality, corruption, and excessive taxation. These problems later sparked a series of peasant-led rebellions, which began with the Gwanseo Peasant War. These events weakened the Joseon government and undermined its control over various regions of Korea outside of Hanseong.

=== Founding of Donghak ===
Various secret societies formed, apart from the rebellions, including the Salbangye, 'Association of the Killers of the Yangban (aristocrats),' the Saljugye, 'Association of the Killers of the (slave's) masters,' the Salryakgye, 'Association of Killers and robbers,' the Geomgye, 'Sword association,' the Judogye, 'Association of the drunk,' the Yudan, 'League of Wanderers', and the Nokrimdang, 'Group of the Green Woods' (Nokrimdang were 'noble thieves,' who stole from the rich and gave to the poor).

In this turbulent age, the Donghak religion was formed. Its founder, Choe Je-u, described the founding of the religion, which Choe Sihyeong, the second Donghak leader, later transcribed:

By 1860, I heard rumours that the people of the West worship God, care not for wealth, conquer the world, build temples, and spread their faith. I was wondering whether I, too, could do such a thing. On an April day, my mind was unnerved, and my body trembled... Suddenly, a voice could be heard. I rose and asked who he was.

"Do not fear nor be scared! The people of the world call me Hanulnim. How do you not know me?" Said Hanul. I asked the reason he had appeared to me. "...I made you in this world so that you could teach my holy word to the people. Do not doubt my word!" Hanulnim replied. "Do you seek to teach the people with Christianity?" I asked again. "No. I have a magical talisman... use this talisman and save the people from disease, and use this book to teach the people to venerate me!"

Donghak was a mixture of various religions. Its core tenets and beliefs (monotheism, sacred books, organized religion) are similar to Christianity. Choe himself said that "the meanings [between Christianity and Donghak] are the same; only the words are different". The Donghak conversion rite, in which hundreds of people gathered in an open place and knelt before a cup of clean water, was partly influenced by the Christian baptism ritual.

However, many direct influences were from shamanism and folk beliefs. Witnesses record that Choe Je-u participated in animistic rituals to mountain deities. His chants and the Sword Dance were also derived from shamanism.

Certain beliefs were unique to Donghak. Choe Je-u said that "All humans are Hanulnim". Choe promoted human equality and created certain ideologies, such as the belief that the world was a cycle of 5,000 years (Jeoncheon and Hucheon) and that this cycle was ending to make way for a new world. This made Donghak potentially dangerous to the Joseon Dynasty, which banned the religion and executed Choe in 1864 for 'Tricking and Lying to the Foolish People.'

Nevertheless, Donghak spread across Gyeongsang Province by the 1870s, causing the need for a better organization. Donghak was organized into 'Jeob' and 'Po.' A 'Jeobju' administered a 'Jeob.' (Note: Jeobju (접주; 接主) and Jeob (접; 接)) For example, Jeon Bong-jun, the leader of the revolution, was Jeobju of Gobu. Under a Jeobju was a 'Myeonjeobju.' In large towns (such as Taein or Jeonju) were a 'Great Jeobju,' as Kim Gae-nam was the Great Jeobju of Taein. Various Jeobs were organized into a 'Po,' and a 'Poju' led a Po. The 'Gyoju,' at the time Choe Sihyeong, led the whole Donghak religion.

=== Yi Pil-je's Revolt ===
In 1871, Yi Pil-je, Jeobju of Yeonghae, revolted using the Donghak infrastructure. The revolt failed but proved that Donghak was dangerous to the feudalistic Korean society.

Yi Pil-je's Revolt seriously undermined Donghak in Gyeongsang Province, causing Choe Sihyeong to spread the religion to the populous provinces of Chungcheong and Jeolla. Choe wandered around these two provinces, spreading Donghak. Son Hwa-jung was one of the first to convert in 1881, and he converted Jeon in 1891. Son Byong-hi was converted in 1882 by Choe, as did Kim Gae-nam in 1890. As seen below, he claimed conversion in 1891.

== Gyojo Shinwon movement ==
By the 1890s, Donghak believers began a petition to overturn the 1863 Choe Je-u's execution charges. The religion was split by this time into the 'Northern Jeob' and the 'Southern Jeob.' Seo Inju, leader of the Southern Jeob, asked Choe Sihyeong, the Gyoju, for a petition. Choe did not answer the request, presumably remembering the effects of Yi Pil-je's Revolt on Donghak in Gyeongsang. Seo Inju and the Southern Jeob independently held a petition to free imprisoned Donghak believers and to restore the honor of Choe Je-u, which was not easily granted. In November 1892, Jeon Bong-jun led the Samrye Petition, petitioning for:

1. Do not ban Donghak.
2. Expel all Western missionaries and merchants.
3. Kill corrupt officials.

In December, there was another petition in the market of Boeun. Many Southern Jeob believers thought they should march into Seoul and petition before the king, but Choe Sihyeong finally quelled the Boeun petition, instead penning a letter to King Gojong:

We... are determined to follow this new doctrine (Donghak) only because we want people to reform themselves, to be loyal to their king, to show filial piety to their parents, to respect their teachers, and to show friendship to their fellow men.

In response, Gojong ordered the Northern messengers to "go to your homes. If you do, I may grant your plea". Meanwhile, Seo Inju and the Southern Jeob were threatening Westerners and Japanese with bodily harm, saying, "If you do not flee by March the seventh, we shall all kill you. You are causing injustice in a foreign land." This was attached to American, French, and Japanese legations, Christian churches and schools, and districts with a large number of foreigners taking residence.

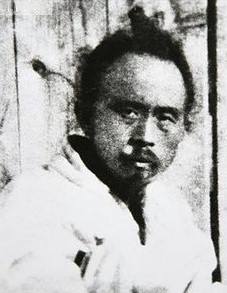
Jeon Bong-jun, the leader of the revolution

Jeon Bong-jun, meanwhile, led his followers into Boeun, which became the most violent and revolutionary petition in the Gyojo Shinwon Movement. His followers all wore blue clothes with red gloves. About 80,000 believers, with the flags "Expel Westerners and Japanese," gathered in the market and built an earthen fortress. Revolutionary thoughts include, "In other countries, the people hold councils and decide upon the government. This petition is like that. Why suppress it?" formed. The petition was also more extreme. The requests were:

- Reclaim the honour of founder Choe Je-u.
- Cease the persecution of Donghak believers.
- Chase away colonial powers.
- Cease all imports of foreign merchandise, wear cotton, and use necessities made in Korea.
- Dispose of the Min family of oligarchical power.
- Lower taxes.
- Ban the inflation-causing Dangojeon coin.
- Stop illegal taxation.

Northern Jeob leaders, such as Choe Sihyeong and Son Byong-hi, feared that the government would execute Donghak believers and stopped the petition within three days. Jeon Bong-jun returned to Gobu.

== Gobu Revolt ==
The rebellion's immediate cause was the conduct of Jo Byeong-gap, the ruling official of Gobu. After his capture, Jeon gave a detailed account of Jo's misdeeds:

- He built the Manseokbo Reservoir under the existing Min Reservoir (now Yedeung Reservoir). He took water taxes from the peasants, two sacks of rice for using the upper reservoir, and a sack of rice for using the lower reservoir. He collected seven hundred sacks of rice in total.
- He promised peasants who farmed abandoned land would be exempt from taxes for five years, but he forced them to pay taxes in the autumn of 1893.
- He fined affluent peasants for dubious crimes, including 'infidelity,' 'lack of harmony,' 'adultery,' and 'needless talents,' by which he collected 20,000 nyang (nyang a unit of Korean currency, equivalent to seventy US dollars, making 20,000 nyang comparable 1.4 million U.S. dollars).
- He taxed a thousand nyang (the equivalent of 700 thousand US dollars) to build a monument to his father, Jo Hugyun, who had been the magistrate of Taein.
- To send sacks of rice to the government, he sent only sacks of spoiled rice to Seoul, taking unspoiled sacks for himself.
- While he was building the reservoir, he heedlessly cut down trees centuries old and did not give any wages to the workers.

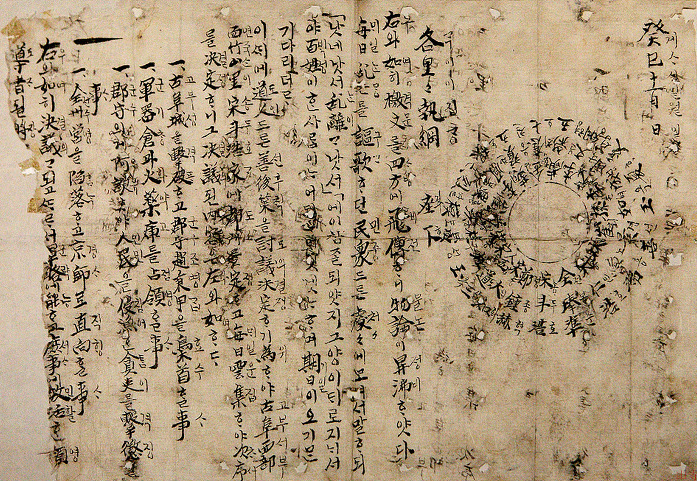
Sabal Tongmun code, made by twenty rebels of Jeongeub, Gobu, and Taein, including Jeon Bong-jun

Of these, the construction of the Manseokbo reservoir caused the most fury. Yedeung Reservoir had caused the Baedeul fields to not suffer from starvation ever since Yedeung was built. However, the construction of the new reservoir blocked creeks in the region, causing widespread damage through flooding.

Donghak believers and angered peasants began forming a rebel army. They used the Sabal Tongmun, whose names were written around a circular cone to form a circle. The Sabal Tongmun made the leader of the writers unclear (because it was impossible to know who had signed their name first). On 10 January 1894, a thousand rebels gathered in an abandoned horse ranch. Splitting into two armies, they destroyed three of the four gates of Gobu and occupied the government office. Jo fled Gobu to Jeonju (he was exiled after the war ended and returned from his exile to become a judge).

For a week, the rebels destroyed prisons and freed innocent prisoners, armed themselves with weapons from the local armory, punished corrupt officials who had been captured, returned taxed and fined property to original owners, and destroyed Manseokbo Reservoir. However, the crisis ended when Jo was replaced by Park Won-myeong, who convinced the rebels to disband.

== First revolt ==
Jeon and Kim went south to Mujang, where they met Son Hwa-jung. The rebels organized adequately in Mujang, and on 20 March, the 4,000 rebels of Mujang turned towards Mount Baek, Gobu. While camped in Mount Baek, the army grew to tens of thousands. Choe Deokyeong's 300 peasants joined them from the north. Here, the aphorism came: "When sitting, a white mountain; when standing, a bamboo mountain." (rebels mostly wore white and used bamboo spears. The term may have appeared earlier, however, as Mount Juk, meaning 'bamboo mountain,' could only be seen when standing, as it was covered by smaller Mount Baek, 'white mountain.') On 22 March, the rebels destroyed the reservoir and burned down governmental offices and storage.

The rebels camped for four days in Gobu, and new rebels joined them daily. After making Jeon Bong-jun the leader and Kim Gae-nam and Son Hwa-Jung as generals, the rebels occupied Taein (1 April) and Buan (4 April). The leaders also ordered the rebels to follow the four guidelines:

1. Do not kill the innocent, and refrain from eating farm animals.
2. Open the Hucheon through loyalty and piety and appease the people.
3. Defeat every single barbarian of Japan and purify the holy land.
4. Drive the army into Seoul and kill every member of the Min family.

The rebels also "did not seek alcohol and women and did not smoke tobacco." They did not forcefully take food but paid for them in money.

=== Battle of Hwangtojae ===
The government sent Yi Gyeonghyo to quell the rebellion and made an emergency army of 700 soldiers and 600 merchants. The 10,000 rebels lured governmental forces into Hwangto Pass. In the dawn of April the 7th, the governmental soldiers charged into the rebel camp but found it empty. Soldiers were in chaos. Suddenly, the rebels, moving under the cover of fog, emerged from the mountains and attacked the governmental forces, killing a thousand soldiers. Most of the rebels were unharmed in the thus concluded Battle of Hwangtojae.

=== Battle of Hwangryong River ===
By 17 April, however, Jeon turned south to Yeonggwang, where Hong Gyehun's governmental troops were waiting. Jeon attempted to lure the troops to Jangseong, and General Yi Hakseung chased after them. Yi Hakseung attacked while the rebels were camped on the Hwangryong River, eating lunch. The rebel leader Yi Bangeon envisioned a new strategy. The rebels fled to the mountains, then ran downhill, rolling thousands of Jangtae, or chicken cages. The Jangtae blocked most bullets, thus rendering the government's superior weapons useless. Moreover, Jeon placed the rebel army so that they would divide Yi Hakseung's troops into three separate divisions. Yi Hakseung ordered the troops to use their cannons. Still, they did not work because the pro-rebel villagers had put water inside the cannons (following the incident, rumours spread throughout the government forces that a ghost had destroyed the cannons). More than 300 governmental forces but only two rebels died in the Battle of Hwangryong River.

=== Siege of Jeonju Fortress ===
After the Hwangryong, a royal messenger brought bribes to quell the rebellion to Jeon. Jeon killed the messenger but took the needed money. Jeon then turned north and occupied Jeonju, the largest city in Jeolla province. not choosing to take Naju to the south. Hong Gyehun quickly returned north, beginning the Siege of Jeonju Fortress.

Meanwhile, on 29 April, the administrator of Jeonju, Kim Mun-hyeon, appeared in Gongju and told the government of the fall of Jeonju. Unable to control the rebellion, the government of Joseon formally requested military assistance from Japan and China. On 3 May, 1,500 Qing Dynasty forces appeared in Incheon. The same day, 6,000 Japanese forces landed in Incheon. The Japanese inquired why the Qing had not notified the Japanese government by the Convention of Tientsin, and soon caused the First Sino-Japanese War.

==== Treaty of Jeonju ====
On 7 May, Kim Hak-jin, the new administrator of Jeonju, ordered Hong to make peace with the rebels. The rebels, suffering from lack of food, accepted. (Note: During the siege, the rebels invented a cuisine that became known as Jeonju bibimbap) This came to be called the Treaty of Jeonju (全州和約) or Jeonju Truce. Hong accepted twelve rebel requests:

1. Accept the Donghak religion.
2. Punish corrupt officials.
3. Punish those who became illegally rich.
4. Punish corrupt Yangban and Seonbi.
5. Free all slaves.
6. Free the Cheonmin class, and cease the branding of butchers.
7. Legalize the remarriage of widows.
8. Lower taxes.
9. Pick politicians based on qualities, not families.
10. Punish those who cooperate with the Empire of Japan.
11. Illegalize debts.
12. Give their land to all peasants.

Following the truce, the rebels climbed out of the fortress using ladders, and Hong entered the empty fortress.

Both sides celebrated their 'victory'. Hong held a feast with his soldiers inside Jeonju Fortress, while the rebels sang the Geomgyeol, a Donghak religious hymn which begins:

Good times, good times, these are good times. These are the best times to come. What must be done if not to use the Thousand Dragons Blade.

== Summer of 1894 ==
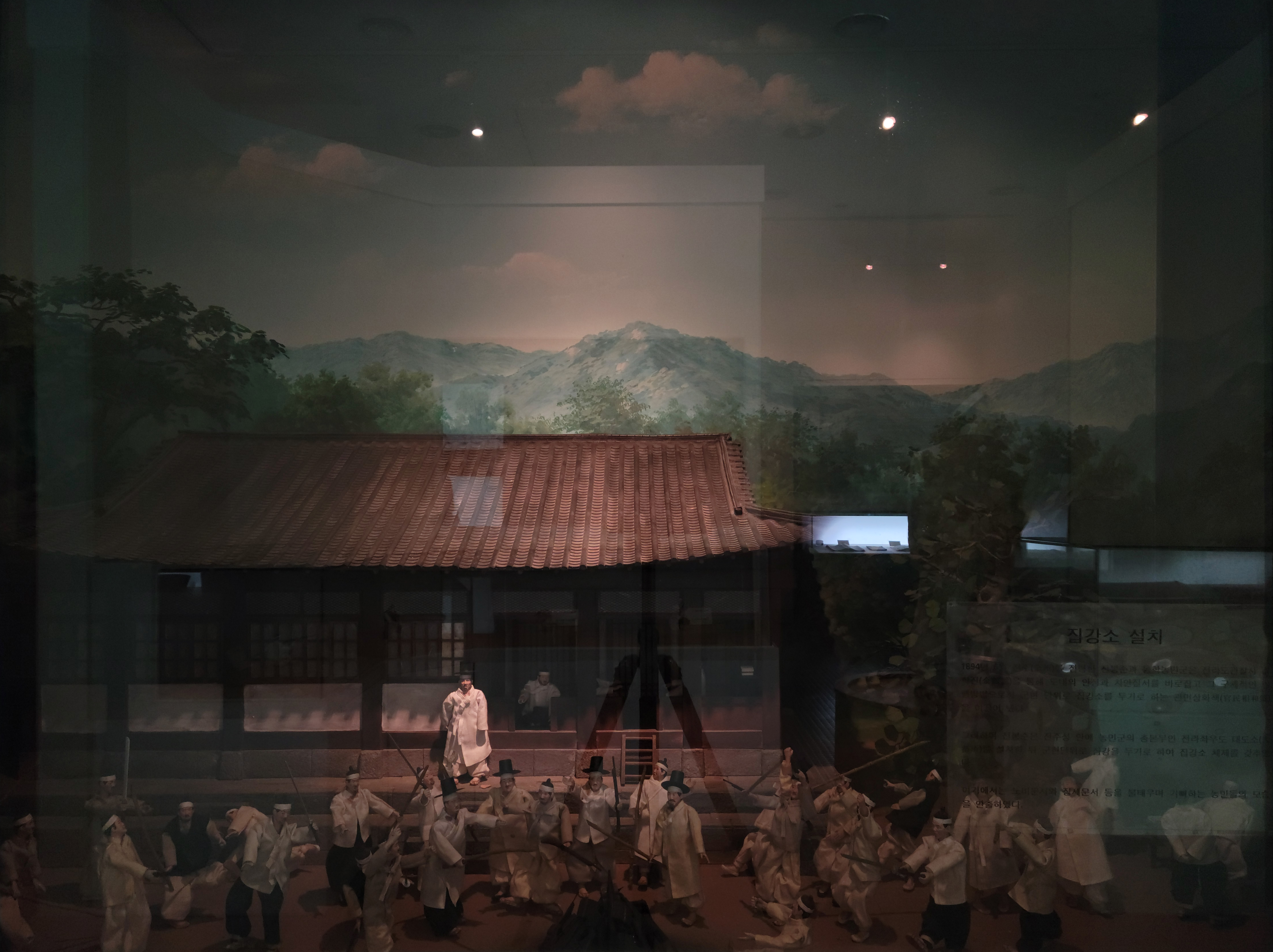
Establishment of the Local Directorates (Jipgangso)

The summer of 1894 was marked by rebel rule over most of Southwest Korea. Jeon Bong-jun established the Jeollajwaudo Daedoso (Great Capital of the Two Jeolla Provinces) in Jeonju and built Jibgangso in most towns. In Naju, Namwon, and Unbong, however, the rebels met fierce resistance from landowners. Jeon had not subdued these southern cities, as he went north after the Battle of the Hwangryong. Choe Gyeong-seon attacked Naju with 3,000 rebels, and the landowners of Naju began to fortify Naju against rebel attacks. Jeon met the Naju landowners and convinced them to allow Jibgangso construction in Naju. However, Naju was still not under complete rebel control and later became the center of rebel persecution. In Namwon, Kim Kaenam also battled landowners with 3,000 rebels, took the fortress, and hanged Kim Yongheon, the anti-rebel leader. Unbong surrendered at the sight of the rebels. Remaining Jibgangso include Daechang High School in Yecheon, Jinnam Office in Yeosu, Geumseong Office in Naju, Mujang Hall in Mujang (preserved by Mujang magistrates as a historical relic), and Yeosan Office in Yeosan (now a town hall).

The Jeobju of the town and his assistant, the Jeobsa, administered a Jibgangso agency. Under the Jeobju were the Seogi, the Seongchal, the Jibsa, the Posa, and the Dongmong. For deciding on matters, there was a council, with the Jeobjang and Jeobsa at its head, who voted on town matters. Yi Yihwa sees this as a rudimentary democracy.

Among the Seogi, Seongchal, the Jibsa, and the Dongmong, the Seogi were scribes who kept records of the activities and decisions of the Jibgangso. They also reprinted orders and publications from the rebel leaders, displayed them on marketplaces, and gave them to the people. Most Seogi were progressive Yangban, as the scribes had to have literacy.

Meanwhile, the Seongchal were town police who administered the law and reported corrupt officials or Yangban to the Dongmong and Posa. Most Seongchal were killed in the Second Revolt.

Dongmong were young men who were arrested, imprisoned, or even flogged those reported by the Seongchal. They also had a powerful hatred for Yangban, often castrating them and using Yangban women to light candles or pour water. Dongmong also led to a curious marriage practice called 'three-day marriage.' Dongmong, searching for partners, hung white scarves on the door of the house of a Yangban who had an unmarried daughter. This meant that the daughter had to marry the Dongmong. To escape the forced marriage, fathers often found another suitable young man and made the daughter marry him within three days in secret. By November, three-day marriage had become so prevalent that the only virgins left were girls under fourteen years of age. Posa, tiger hunters who served effectively as soldiers, cooperated with the Seongchal and Dongmong to fight against the Yangban resistance.

The rebels referred to their cause as the Dongdo (another name for 'Donghak') and their army as the Dongdo Euibyeong, the "Righteous army of Donghak." Rebels called themselves 'Hajeob,' after the lowest Donghak initiate, and called any other person, even children, 'Jeobjang,' a rendering of Jeobju.

== Second revolt ==
While the First Sino-Japanese War raged on, Japanese troops occupied Seoul and made a pro-Japanese government there. Before the Battle of Pyongyang, Jeon's strategy seemed to crush the fleeing Japanese from the South while the Chinese soldiers chased them from the North. However, his prediction was proved wrong, with a major Chinese defeat in Pyongyang. Jeon decided he should defeat the Japanese by taking control of Korea and severing Japanese supply lines. However, he knew he would have to get the support of the Northern Jeob, who commanded all Donghak outside Jibgangso-controlled areas.

Choe Sihyeong was staunchly anti-rebel, as he feared that a large-scale rebellion based on the Donghak religion would end with the destruction of Donghak. The Northern Jeob had to fight against the largely Southern Jeob rebels to escape persecution. Here is an excerpt of his words:

The government does not know the difference between medicine (Northern) and poison (Southern). They will burn the stones (Southern) and the jade (Northern)... Hence, we must prove our allegiance to the king by conquering the South.

=== Samrye Council ===
On 14 September, Northern and Southern leaders gathered in Samrye. It is said that Jeon rode a white horse in this meeting. The Northern flags said 'Conquer the South,' while Southern ones said 'Conquer the Foreigners' or 'Protect the Nation.' After a month of negotiations, on 12 October, Choe Sihyeong finally cried out to the Northern Jeob: "Shall we die while seated?".

The Northern leader, Son Byong-hi, led 10,000–100,000 Northern Jeob followers as the General of the Northern Jeob. Jeon also led 12,000–100,000 Southerners as the General of the Southern Jeob (most recent estimates give a total army of about 50,000). However, Kim Kaenam was absent; he led 5,000 rebels in an attack on Cheongju. Together, they marched north to Gongju, the capital of Chungcheong Province. As they marched, Jeon said:

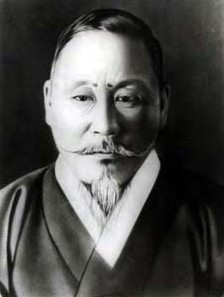
Son Byong-hi, leader of the Northern Jeob

We shall not eat dogs or chicken. The meat of a dog weakens and maddens us, and we are born from the power of Mount Gyeryong, the Rooster Dragon mountain. Eating chicken shall weaken that power.

=== Battle of Ugeumchi ===
Although the army had started with 40,000 rebels, when they camped at Non Stream, 12 kilometers south of Gongju, the army was 10,000; peasants joined them as they marched. There were also 50 Chinese soldiers, who had fled from the Sino-Japanese War. Inside the Fortress of Gongju were perhaps 3,000 governmental forces led by Gu Sangjo, Seong Hayeong, Jang Yongjin, and Yi Gidong, and some 400 Japanese soldiers led by Colonel Moriya.

The Donghak army's strategy was to surround Gongju from Buyeo and Nonsan. On 23 October, a rebel battalion took Yiyin and Hyopyo, four kilometers south of Gongju.

On 24 and 25 October, the Battle of Ung Pass, or Ungchi, occurred between rebels and a coalition army of Japanese soldiers, governmental forces, and anti-rebel guerrillas. Ungchi was a pass that led straight to Gongju, a crucial location for the rebels. However, the rebels were not able to take Ungchi. Most were armed with only bows and arrows, spears, swords, and seventeenth-century-style muskets, which could not defeat the coalition's superior firepower. The Northern Jeob experienced severe casualties in Ungchi because they lacked proper training in war.

The rebels retreated south to Nonsan. Jeon and Son decided to capture Gongju through a different pass: Ugeum Pass, or Ugeumchi.

On 8 November, two battalions lured governmental forces so that the major rebel forces would not meet a large governmental army in Ugeumchi. At 3:00 in the afternoon, the rebels concentrated the governmental forces in Yiyin and Hyopyo, where 10,000 rebels were. The other 200,000 rebels were crossing Ugeumchi. However, they encountered a Japanese battalion of 280 soldiers. The Japanese gathered the Korean forces into Ugeumchi. After a night passed, the two armies clashed in Ugeumchi at the dawn of 9 November.

Jeon placed his army so the rebels stretched sixteen kilometers from Panchi to Mount Bonghwang. Jeon was at the center of this line, surrounded by flags and riding his white horse. The government forces defended the sides (Hyopyo, Ungchi, Mount Bonghwang) while the Japanese were stationed in Ugeumchi proper. At 10:00 am, the rebels charged at Ugeumchi.

Because of their weak weapons, they were unable to cross Ugeumchi. The Japanese used cannons and rifles and had proper military training. Although small groups of rebels crossed the 'death line' more than forty times, they were all shot down. After one charge at the Japanese, only 10,000 of the original 200,000 rebels were left. After the following charge, there were 3,000 rebels left. When the rebels finally retreated on 10 November, only 500 out of an army of 200,000 remained.

Meanwhile, in Hyopyo, the 10,000 rebels captured various peaks, but the Japanese instantly reinforced them whenever the governmental forces seemed to break. By 10 November, both armies retreated to Nonsan. The Battle of Ugeumchi was over. A spectator of the battle expressed the battle:

And we finally destroyed the thieving raiders... It was as if the stars themselves were falling from the sky, and the autumn leaves were being scattered on the lands.

=== Retreat from Gongju ===
Jeon and his 500 remaining rebels retreat south from Gongju while the allied forces of the Joseon Army and the Imperial Japanese Army pursue them. They arrived in Nonsan to rendezvous with the other Donghak peasants defeated by government and Japanese troops. But they were defeated and forced back to Jeonju Fortress to gather an army of 8,000 rebels. However, they abandoned the fort because of the lack of supplies and retreated to Wonpyeong and Taein, the rebel center, to reorganize their army.

On 25 November, the Japanese caught up with the rebels and camped in Mount Gumi. Despite rebel strategic superiority, the Japanese firepower annihilated both the rebels and the city of Taein. A historian, Park Eunsik, recorded "nothing left in Taein for 40 kilometers". Forty civilian houses, along with perhaps 400 rebels, were killed.

After the Battle of Taein, on 28 November 1894, Jeon formally dissolved the Donghak Army. The rebels cried: "We thought Jeon Nokdu (Jeon's nickname) would save us, but now we are all going to die." Jeon answered: "War is a game of luck. Why is it that you blame me?". He then dressed up as a peasant and headed east.

== Battles outside the main front ==
=== Jeolla ===
Jeolla Province was the revolution's center, completely seized by the rebels. They formed the core of the Anti-Japanese Frontier and often aided Gyeongsang and Chungcheong rebels. Kim Inbae of Gwangyang and Yi Bangeon of Jangheung formed the core of South Jeolla rebels.

==== Namwon and Unbong ====
Namwon and Unbong were ruled by Kim Gae-nam's rebels. However, Kim Gae-nam had gone to attack Cheongju far to the north, and in his absence, the governmental soldiers attacked Namwon. On 13 November, the rebels were driven away from the outskirts of Namwon in a small battle. The 3,000 rebels fled to Namwon Fortress. Jo Byeongho, the governmental leader, led 2,000 soldiers armed with modern weapons to besiege Namwon. Although the fortress was bombed and shelled, the rebels did not come out. Finally, the governmental troops stacked hay around the east, west, and south walls and burned the hay. The wooden doors burned along, and the rebels fled through the north door. Hundreds of rebels were killed in the Siege of Namwon.

==== Jindo ====
In Jindo, the third largest island of Korea (after Jeju and Geoje), Na Chihyeon of Naju converted the population to Donghak in January 1892. After the fall of Jeonju Fortress, the Jindo magistrate Yi Heuiseung (who, like Jo, built two monuments to himself) fled. However, Confucian scholars maintained order on the island through an army called Suseonggun. In July, Son Haenggwon assaulted Susseonggun bases, taking matchlock rifles, swords, bullets, gunpowder, and tridents. At a similar time, Park Jungjin attacked the Suseonggun at Shimijang village. He was killed, and his daughter captured; descendants destroyed the family tree and burned down the house.

After the arrival of new officials, the Jindo rebels joined the Naju rebels. Most were captured and returned to Jindo. On 10 October, 1,322 soldiers, composed mainly of slaves and lower officials, were sent to defend Jindo against possible rebel attacks.

In December, rebels who had fought under Yi Bangeon hid in Jindo after the Battle of Seokdae Fields. However, the rebels had lost all military power and were captured and imprisoned. On 27 December, Japanese soldiers executed fifty rebels. Cheondoism remained in Jindo until the 1950s.

=== Gyeongsang ===
Gyeongsang Province had a solid Confucian influence, and the casualties of Yi Pil-je's Revolt in 1871 were still fresh. It took until August for Gyeongsang rebels to begin revolting. Suppression of revolts was an organized effort, with Toposa officials specializing in anti-rebel campaigns.

==== Jinju ====
The forces of the Southwest coasts of Korea were unique in that the Jeolla and Gyeongsang Provinces cooperated to attack Jinju Fortress. They are collectively termed under the name 'Jinju Rebels.'

On 7 May, Kim Inbae, the Great Jeobju of Geumgu, built a Jibgangso in Suncheon, Jeolla Province. On 1 September, Kim crossed the Gyeongsang-Jeolla boundary. His strategy was to charge through the southern coastline to Busan and thus grasp the Japanese-Korean borderline.

Meanwhile, Hadong and Jinju, who were Kim's targets, were experiencing rebel activities. Hadong rebels were chased west by the government, joining Kim Inbae. With the guidance of the Hadong rebels, Kim Inbae captured Hadong on 7 September.

The leadership recruited rebels in Jinju by sending out public documents in significant markets. On 8 September 1894, 7,000 rebels gathered in Sugok Market and established the Chungyeong Daedoso, a center of rebel activities. By 17 September, a joint army of Suncheon and Jinju rebels had captured the Jinju fortress.

The rebels held flags signaling their Po and Jeob and spread manifestos titled To the People of the Towns of Gyeongsang throughout nearby villages. The manifesto said the following.

- The state is the people, and the people are the state.
- We have had a council in Jinju to punish the Japanese invasion.
- All believers in Donghak must rise and punish corrupt officials who support the Japanese.
- Report anti-rebel armies to the Chunggyeong Daedoso.

In response to the fall of the Jinju Fortress, the government sent Ji Seokyeong as Toposa of Jinju, a government official who specialized in suppressing the Donghak revolutions.

On 10 October, 400 rebels gathered in Mount Geumo, a few kilometers west of Jinju, where Japanese forces ambushed them. Although the rebels lost more than seventy men in the Battle of Mount Geumo, the rebels still held Jinju Fortress.

On 14 October, 5,000 rebels defended Mount Goseong Fortress against the Japanese. Using the fortress, the rebels fought fiercely against Colonel Suzuki's Japanese battalion but were ultimately defeated by Japanese firepower. One hundred eighty-seven rebels were killed, causing Mount Goseong to be called Mount Gosireong after the sound that a decomposing corpse makes when it rains. The remnants of the rebels fled to Mount Jiri, where they became the Righteous Army.

=== Chungcheong ===
Chungcheong rebels were under the command of Son Byong-hi, who led the Northern Jeob into battle at Ugeumchi. After the defeat at Ugeumchi, Son continued the rebellion until the Battle of Jonggok on 18 December. Chungcheong was the location of the December battles.

==== Cheongju ====
Rebel leader Kim Gae-nam, also known as 'King Gae-nam', fought in the Battle of Cheongju

On 9 October, before the Council of Samrye had reached its conclusion, there was a minor skirmish in Daejeon, at the time a small village called Hanbat, between rebels and governmental forces. This came to be called the Daejeon Massacre. Seventy-eight rebels gave 78 government soldiers alcohol, then killed them while drunk.

Meanwhile, the city of Cheongju was the Donghak division commanded by the Great Jeobju, Son Cheonmin. Kim Gae-nam and Son Cheonmin cooperated to attack Cheongju in the Battle of Cheongju on 9 December 1894. Because Kim did not fight at Ugeumchi, his army of 25,000 was still strong.

When Jeon and Son gathered the rebel forces in Samrye, Kim did not cooperate. He began his attack only after the Battle of Ugeumchi, and by 9 December, he reached Cheongju Fortress.

Kim's opponent was Kuwabara Eiziro and his Japanese battalion, along with governmental troops with little morale. Kim's 15,000 men attacked from the South, while Son Cheonmin's 10,000 attacked from the North. The defenders of Cheongju lacked morale due to the Daejeon Massacre, and Kim nearly broke through the south door. Eiziro suddenly assaulted the rebels, and Kim retreated to Muneui.

Two hundred rebels were killed in the Battle of Cheongju. The rebels also lost large amounts of weaponry, including many rebel banners, thousands of bows and arrows, 140 rifles, 2,000 flintlock muskets, 150 kilograms of gunpowder, 2 cannons, and 50 horses. After the Battle of Cheongju, Kim went south to Muneui but was defeated again. He went into hiding, just as Jeon Bong-jun did.

==== Northern Chungcheong ====
Although Choe Sihyeong had banned rebel activities among the Northern Jeob during the spring of 1894, many Chungcheong rebels were Northern Jeob. By 22 March, rebels of Hoenggang, Yeongdeung, Cheongsan, Boeun, Okcheon, Jinjam, Muneui, Goesan, and Yeongpung were already giving the wealth of the rich to the poor, and beat and castrated corrupt Yangban. However, the Chungju rebels temporarily stopped activities due to the beginning of the Sino-Japanese War.

The Battle of Pungdo and the Battle of Seonghwan were both fought in Chungcheong Province, and the war sparked anti-Japanese sentiment among the former rebels. In July, 1,000 rebels wandered through various towns, building earthen fortresses in preparation for a Japanese invasion of Chungcheong. The rebels took weaponry from the governmental storages and trained themselves. In August, a small battle was between the Northern and the Southern Jeob.

On 12 October, Choe Sihyeong ordered the Northern Jeob to revolt. The rebels of Northern Chungcheong organized under the Jeob and Po and began active revolts.

More than a hundred battles took place in Northern Chungcheong in this period. The Gwandong Po won against a Japanese battalion in the Battle of Goesan under the leadership of Sim Songhak. The rebels then reached Boeun, thus severing all direct roads between Seoul and Jeolla. The revolt flared even greater when Son Byong-hi joined the Northern Chungcheong rebels. Survivors of the Battle of Taein joined the rebels as well.

On 18 December, 2,600 rebel forces gathered in Jonggok. The rebels included the great Northern leader Son Byeonghui, whose family lived near Jonggok, and the patriarch of Donghak, Choe Sihyeong. Japanese sources report that the rebels were cooking meals when the Japanese attacked them. Because of the surprise attack, the rebels were not able to put up a suitable defense, leading to 2,500 rebels out of 2,600 being killed. (Some scholars prefer the term Jonggok Massacre.) Both Choe and Son survived but fled towards the South. Minor skirmishes continued in this region until 28 December.

==== Battle of Mount Seseong ====
The rebels of Cheonan, Hongseong, and northwestern Chungcheong were defeated in the Battle of Mount Seseong. This battle was also the key to Jeon Bong-jun's plan to capture Seoul.

In August, 1,500 rebels revolted in Cheonan and took governmental weapons. After organizing their army in Mount Soto, the rebels camped in Mount Seseong with their newfound weaponry. Mount Seseong was more of a low hill, 22 meters high, defended by a low wall, which has been in use since the Proto-Three Kingdoms Age. The rebel leaders were Kim Yongheui, Kim Hwaseong, Kim Seongji, Kim Bokyong, Kim Yeongu, and Won Keumok.

On 18 November, two Japanese platoons were located on the northern slopes, another platoon to the northeast and another to the southeast. At dawn, the southeast platoon ambushed the rebels, who resisted for two hours, aided by their superior knowledge of the terrain. However, they were forced to retreat to the west, where they were ambushed again by the two northern platoons.

Three hundred seventy rebels were killed, 770 were wounded, and 17 were captured. The rebels also lost 140 guns, two trumpets, 228 spears, 26,500 Chinese bullets, 30 flags, 226 sacks of rice, and 13 sacks of barley. Kim Bokyong was captured and executed on the spot, and the other leaders were executed on 24 and 27 November. The hill was known as Mount Siseong, meaning 'Mountain washed with blood.'

=== Gyeonggi ===
Because Gyeonggi was very close to Seoul, rebel activities in Gyeonggi were few. The largest Gyeonggi rebel groups, numbering 1,000 rebels, were in Yicheon, Yeoju, Anseong, and other parts of Southeastern Gyeonggi. The Gyeonggi rebels retreated south to Chungcheong, joining the rebels of Northern Chungcheong. Most were killed in the Battle of Jonggok (see above).

=== Gangwon ===
Gangwon rebels can be divided into two groups: the rebels of Gangneung and the rebels of Hoengseong and Wonju. Rebels from Northern Chungcheong or Gyeonggi occasionally crossed into Wonju. Gangwon rebels were especially marked by guerrilla warfare.

==== Gangneung and Pyeongchang ====
In these regions, rebels would occupy Gangneung, then flee to mountainous locations such as Pyeongchang, then return to Gangneung.

In September, more than 1,000 rebels attacked Gangneung, which lacked defenses. The rebels gave one sack of rice to each peasant by taking the wealth of the rich and built strongholds in most marketplaces. The rebels formed their court, lowered taxes, and punished corrupt Yangban and rich Sangmin.

On 7 September, an anti-rebel battalion led by Yi Hoewon assaulted the sleeping rebels in the rainy dawn. Twenty rebels were killed, and Yi's forces took 7 guns, 157 spears, and 2 horses. The rebels then marched through the Daegwanryeong Pass into Pyeongchang.

By late September, the rebels had reorganized and recaptured Gangneung. they also occupied Pyeongchang, Yeongweol, and Jeongseon. In response, the Japanese army sent Captain Ishimori against the Gangneung rebels on 3 November. On 5 November, 10,000 rebels had a two-hour-long battle against Ishimori's troops but were ultimately defeated. The rebels fled to Jeongseon.

On 6 November, the governmental troops killed ten rebels in Jeongseon and burned down 70 houses. The rebels again fled to Pyeongchang.

Ishimori fought against 3,000 rebels in Pyeongchang on 1 December 1894. The rebels scattered after an hour of battle. Seventy rebels were instantly killed, 30 died from their wounds, and ten prisoners were killed for attempted rebellion. The Gangneung rebels ceased to exist after this battle.

==== Hoengseong, Wonju, and Hongcheon ====
Rebels of these regions were primarily guerrillas in mountainous terrain. The rebel leader was the legendary Cha Giseok, the Great Jeobju of the Gwandong Region. He led 1,000 rebels, who punished corrupt Yangban and collected taxes from merchants. It is said that Cha killed hundreds of Yangban.

On 13 October, Cha attacked Dongchang, where the taxes collected in Gangwon were brought to Seoul by boat. He burned down Dongchang and gave the taxes to the peasants. The magistrate of Hongcheon reports that after the destruction of Dongchang, more and more people joined Cha's army.

The government asked Maeng Yeongjae, a Confucian scholar, to conquer Cha's 'crowd of roving thieves.' Maeng, suppressing the rebels of Yicheon at the time, gladly obliged. On 21 October, Maeng and Cha battled in the Jangya Fields, in which more than 30 rebels were killed. The rebels fled to Seoseok, into the 'Seonang Pass.' It was so named because there was an altar to the deity Seonangshin in the past.

On 22 October, 2,000 rebels were killed in the consequent Battle of Jajak Pass, the largest battle in Gangwon Province before the Korean War. The rebels lacked guns, and they used birch branches as weapons. They also lacked pots and cooked rice over cattle hide. Because of the narrowness of the pass, the rebels were crowded, and it was easy for Maeng's troops to fire into the camp and kill the rebels. Maeng himself reports that "it was impossible to see how many died," but descendants have estimated 1,800~2,000. Descendants also note that the battle continued for three or four days. The Seonang Pass was renamed Jajak Pass because the blood made a 'Jajak' sound as it rolled down the pass.

On 26 October, the survivors, including Cha, regathered. On 11 November, they began the Battle of Mount Odae, in which Maeng's soldiers surrounded Mount Odae and began to climb it to defeat the rebels inside. One hundred rebels were killed, and 40 houses were burned. Cha was captured on 14 November and beheaded for treason in Chuncheon.

=== Hwanghae ===
1893, the Joseon Dynasty banned gold mining in Hwanghae Province. Although Hwanghae leaders, such as Kim Gu the 'Baby Jeobju' (Kim Gu was 18 at the time, compared to the 40-year-old Jeon Bong-jun or the 32-year-old Son Byong-hi), were believers in Donghak, most of the rebels were gold miners. Lieutenant Suzuku classified Hwanghae rebels in three ways:

1. True Donghak, "who mutter incantations and believe that their faith shall cure diseases, bring wealth, and lengthen life."
2. Temporary Donghak, "who do not believe the teachings... but join the Donghak religion."
3. False Donghak, "those... who hate foreigners... are suppressed by local magistrates, suffer from inflation, or can no longer mine for gold. Most are gold miners, and that is because... gold mining was banned last year, and... they no longer have money, and they wish for revenge".

==== Haeju ====
Haeju was one of the two provincial capitals to fall to the rebels (the other being Jeonju). The defeat of the Haeju rebels is documented in Lieutenant Suzuku's Conquest of the Donghak of Hwaghae.

By 27 November, the rebels had captured most of the Hwanghae coast, including Haeju, without a significant battle. However, at the dawn of 27 November, 400 rebels camped on Pyeongsan were assaulted by governmental forces and fled south to Nucheon. Knowing that the Japanese and the government troops were chasing them, they hurriedly ran to Nucheon. Suzuku captured many Donghak food supplies in Nucheon, including "hundreds of sacks of millet."

On 29 November, Suzuku captured the town of Gajichon. However, there were no men in Gajichon. When the women of Gajichon were interrogated, they revealed that all grown men had been ordered to go to the town of Onjeong. Suzuku's soldiers burned four sacks of rice cakes in Gajichon.

The Japanese reached Onjeong, only to find it empty. The magistrate of Onjeong said that the rebels had never come and that they were to go to Haeju rather than Onjeong. Haeju, too, was empty. The governor of Hwanghae said that "every town outside of Haeju is full of thieves... two-thirds of all towns in Hwanghae are full of the Donghak raiders".

With the guidance of the officials of Haeju, the Japanese defeated hundreds of rebels in the hour-long Battle of Gohyeonjang, killing "tens of thieves." They also captured and beheaded several rebels and burned five houses.

Kim Gu and his rebels sought to reoccupy Haeju and attacked Japanese scouts at 6:00 am on 2 December 1894. The battle continued until 8:00 when the rebels finally fled. Tens of rebels were again killed, and many were captured. Suzuku discovered a manifesto from the captured rebels written by Choe Sihyeong, the Donghak patriarch. The manifesto proved that the Haeju rebels were under the command of Choe Sihyeong and the Northern Jeob leaders.

The rebels gathered in Cheongdan, 2.5 kilometers away from Haeju. Seven thousand rebels were camped in the east and the South, and 400 were hidden in the pine forests. Ten thousand were camped 400 meters away, and 14,000 were camped a kilometer away. Because the rebels lacked rifles and other modern weaponry, they were crushed after three Japanese strikes. However, the rebels did not retreat. Because the Japanese also lacked ammunition due to the large number of rebels, they finally directly charged at the rebels. Although the rebels only had old-fashioned muskets, the superior numbers of the rebels wore out the Japanese soldiers. The rebels fled and were chased for 600 meters. Minor skirmishes continued until January 1895, and Kim Gu hid in the house of An Taehun, a Catholic and the father of An Junggeun, until 1896.

=== Pyongan and Hamgyong ===
Pyongan Province had little rebel activity. It suffered extreme casualties in the First Sino-Japanese War, especially at the Battle of Pyongyang. There were occasional reports of rebels killing magistrates or attacking Japanese support lines, but such instances were rare. Also, there were only two Jeobju for all of Pyongan, compared with seven for Hwanghae and Gyeonggi, ten for Gangwon, seventeen for Chungcheong, nineteen for Gyeongsang, and twenty-five for Jeolla.

There were minor incidents of rebellions in Hamgyong:

My grandfather died at thirty-nine. Our home was Haunseung Village, Suha Township, in Dancheon County. There and in Samsu, my grandfather caused a Donghak rebellion. But [he was defeated] and fled to a village called Neuteulgol where slash-and-burners lived. He hid in a potato container, but two Japanese soldiers opened the lid and ordered him to come out. So, he commits suicide by splitting his stomach open with a dagger.

== Fall ==
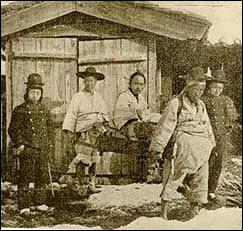
The capture of Jeon Bong-jun. He is in the center, seated in a carriage because his legs were broken in the escape attempt.

Although Jeon Bong-jun officially disbanded the rebel army after the Battle of Taein, many other commanders did not disband their respective armies until December. On 1 December, Son Hwa-jung and Choe Gyeong-seon disbanded their rebel armies in Gwangju and went into hiding. The same day, the great rebel leader Kim Gae-nam was captured. Kim had been betrayed by a friend named Yim Byeongchan and captured by 80 governmental soldiers who surrounded the house of Kim's brother-in-law. Kim was dragged to Naju. On 13 December, he was put to death by beheading, and his corpse was ripped apart in five. The magistrate of Naju ate Kim's intestines and liver.

On 2 December, Jeon Bong-jun was also captured in a village called Pinori in modern Sunchang (see left), betrayed by his lieutenant Kim Gyeongcheon. Jeon suspected Kim had betrayed him and leaped out of the two-story house holding his musket. However, the house was surrounded by governmental soldiers, and he was hit many times with large sticks, causing him to break his legs. Jeon was imprisoned and taken to Seoul. Kim Gyeongcheon went into hiding because he feared that the rebels would kill him. Trials were not held because the government wanted to immediately put Jeon, Son Hwa-jung, Choe Gyeong-Seon, and Kim Deokmyeong on trial. (these four, along with Kim Gae-Nam, are known as the Five Donghak Generals)

Also, by December, the Anti-Japanese Frontier had been pushed down to the southern coast of Korea. On 7 December, the Japanese finally killed Kim Inbae, the Great Jeobju of Geumgu, who had aided the Jinju rebels in the Battle of Gwangyang Fortress. Kim Inbae's head was tied to a pole and displayed in Gwangyang. However, in Jangheung, the rebel leader Yi Bangeon captured Gangjin on 7 December. On 11 December, Son Hwa-jung was also arrested.

Meanwhile, the Japanese were attacking Yi Bangeon and the Jangheung rebels, forming the region's last organized rebel army. On 15 December, the final major battle in Jeolla Province, the Battle of the Seokdae Fields, was fought between Yi Bangeon's rebels and the Japanese. This battlefield is now one of the Four Battlefields of the Donghak Revolution. Thirty thousand rebels were present, and 2,000 were killed. As the 800 Japanese soldiers moved through Yeongam, Gangjin, Haenam, and Jindo Island, they engaged in a scorched-earth strategy, killing 600 civilians and burning villages and sacks of rice. Yi Bangeon was finally captured in Christmas 1894 and beheaded with his son in Seoul. With the death of Yi Bangeon, the rebels had been completely exterminated, except for 30 rebels who hid in Mount Daedun.

Sometime in December, Choe Gyeong-seon was also captured. On 1 January 1895, the last rebel leader, Kim Deokmyeong, was captured in Wonpyeong. The four leaders were put on trial, and Jeon Bong-jun's testimony during the trials formed the Testimony of Jeon Bong-jun. In his testimony, Jeon emphasized that Donghak believers formed only a small fragment of the rebels, the majority being peasants seeking vengeance. However, he also explained the theology of Donghak to the court. He also denied connections with the Great Regent Heungseon.

On 29 March, the four leaders were hanged for treason. Later, Confucian scholars stole the bodies, beheaded them, and displayed the heads in public. Only Choe Gyeong-seon's body has been identified, and the locations of the other three are unknown.

The last battle in the Donghak Revolution was the Battle of Mount Daedun on 17 February. The 30 rebels held the mountain for three days until a Japanese battalion attacked them by climbing up the rocky cliffs. Only a young child survived. However, rebels were still killed in 1895 in various ways. Those included:

- Chaining rebels together, then burying them alive in a pit
- Chaining rebels together, then drowning them in the sea. The coast was said to be littered with corpses.
- Piercing the skull with a sharp wooden stick, then burning the stick so that the brain would explode.
- Ripping apart rebels by using horses or cows
- Shredding a rebel to parts using a chariot
- Piercing the stomach with a bamboo stick
- Cutting open the chest and eating the liver and intestines

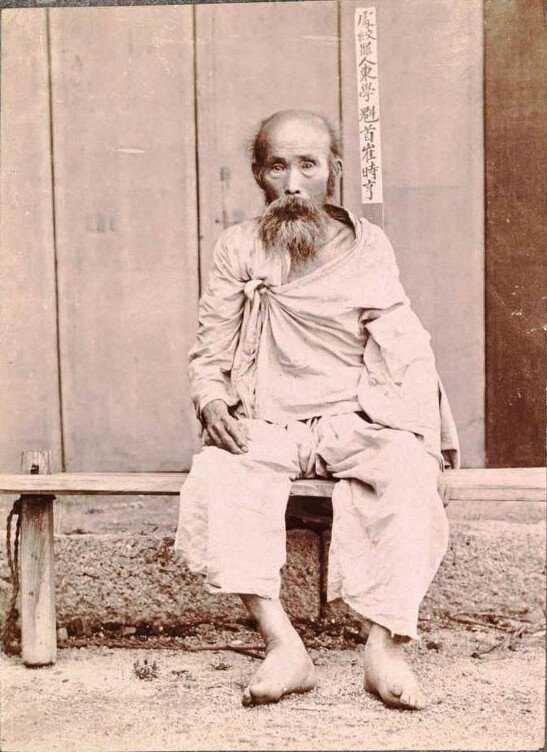
Choe Si-hyeong before execution

Meanwhile, the Northern leaders Choe Sihyeong and Son Byong-hi had fled after the defeat at Jonggok. In January 1898, Choe and Son escaped arrest because Kim Yeonguk had been misidentified for Choe Sihyeong. In April 1898, however, Choe was captured and put on trial. Because the government wished to execute Choe before he died of disease, the trials were speedily done. Son Byong-hi and a group of other believers attempted to free Choe by bribing the judges with land, but Choe was executed after a month. He was buried in the cemetery with a small marker saying 'Donghak Ringleader Choe Sihyeong.' That night, Son and the others secretly entered the cemetery and took Choe's body. Choe was reburied in Gwangju.

== Legacy ==
Some of the rebel demands, including the remarriage of widows and the freeing of enslaved people, was included in the Gabo Reform. However, the reform was not supported because it did not include land reform, which was the peasants' greatest need.

Many rebels later joined the Righteous Army. The 1895 Righteous Army was led by Confucian scholars who killed rebels when they attempted to enter. However, the Righteous Armies of 1905 and 1907 were almost entirely composed of rebels. For example, Yu Eunshik of Chungju killed his lieutenant when he revealed himself as a former rebel. Jeon Haesan, the most famous of the Jeolla Righteous Army leaders, was often called the 'son of Jeon Bong-jun' and participated in more than 70 battles from 1905 to 1910 against the Japanese before he was hanged in 1910. However, in his War Diary of Jeon Haesan, Jeon Haesan says that he "did not like to be called the 'son of Jeon Nokdu'(Jeon Bong-jun's nickname)," presumably meaning he was not Jeon Bong-jun's son. However, the current edition of the North Korean history textbook claims that 'the patriotic line' descends from Jeon Changhyeok (Jeon Bong-jun's father and Gyojo Shinwon leader) through Jeon Bong-jun to Jeon Haesan. The South Korean Ministry of Education claims that this is North Korean textbook revisionism to glorify Kim Il Sung by comparing the Kim family to the Jeon family.

Many former rebels became nationalists and independence activists. The tiger hunter Hong Beomdo, whom Donghak influenced, became a guerrilla leader of Manchuria. Kim Gu the 'Baby Jeobju,' who fought at the Battle of Haeju, became a profound nationalist and one of the most respected Korean leaders.

The Donghak religion also experienced a profound change. With the death of Choe Sihyeong, Son Byong-hi became the third patriarch. To escape persecution as 'rebels,' he renamed Donghak 'Cheondoism' and fully established the 'Human is Hanulnim' doctrine, thus making Cheondoism a fully pantheistic religion (Choe Je-u seems to have been a panentheist). Cheondoism was legalized in 1905, but Son was imprisoned in 1919 for leading the March 1st Movement and died in prison. Son's son-in-law, Bang Jeonghwan, was also a Cheondoist who became a famous child activist and founded the Children's Day in Korea. The artist Suh Yong-sun drew a work titled Donghak Peasant Revolution on canvas using acrylic paint.

== Controversies ==
=== Role played by Donghak ===
There is an ongoing controversy about the naming of the revolution, connected to the exact role that the Donghak religion played in the revolution. Theories include:

1. The revolution was fundamentally based on the Donghak religion and should thus be called the 'Donghak Rebellion' or the 'Donghak Revolution.' This argument is based on the fact that every pre-1922 source called the 'Donghak Rebellion,' and every major leader was a Jeobju or Poju. This was the stance by South Korea when it was ruled under a military junta.
2. The revolution was fundamentally based on the peasants who were suppressed by the government and should thus be called the 'Peasant Rebellion of 1894', the 'Peasant Revolution of 1894', or the 'Peasant War of 1894'. This argument is based on Jeon Bong-jun's testimony: "There were many angered peasants and few Donghak." This is the official stance made by North Korea.
3. The rebel leaders were Donghak believers, but the armies were aggravated peasants. They should thus be called the 'Donghak Peasant Revolution,' 'Donghak Peasant Rebellion,' 'Donghak Peasant War,' or the 'Donghak Peasant Movement.' Jeon testified, "Our leaders were Donghak, but the army were peasants." This is the current South Korean position.

=== Role played by the Great Regent Heungseon ===
The role played by King Gojong's father, the Great Regent Heungseon, is open to controversy. Jeon Bong-jun first met Heungseon in 1890 in Unhyeon Palace. Jeon lived with the Great Regent Heungseon from 1890 to 1892 and revisited him in February 1893. In the meeting, Jeon said to the Heungseon: "I wish to die for the country and the people." There were many rumors that the Heungseon had secretly caused the rebellion in this meeting.

It is also said that the Heungseon (or occasionally Gojong himself) sent a messenger to Jeon after the Jeonju Truce, asking him to drive out the Japanese. This has not been confirmed. For evidence, the message of Mikhail Hitrovo, the Russian envoy to Japan who sent his message to the Russian envoy to Korea a month before the start of the revolution, is often cited:

[The Great Regent] is planning a great riot as its leader, beginning in summer or autumn. Already, the leaders are buying weapons from China and Japan, and 4,000 rifles have already been purchased. A few are from Japan, and a few Japanese have joined this scheme, of which the Japanese government knows nothing about.

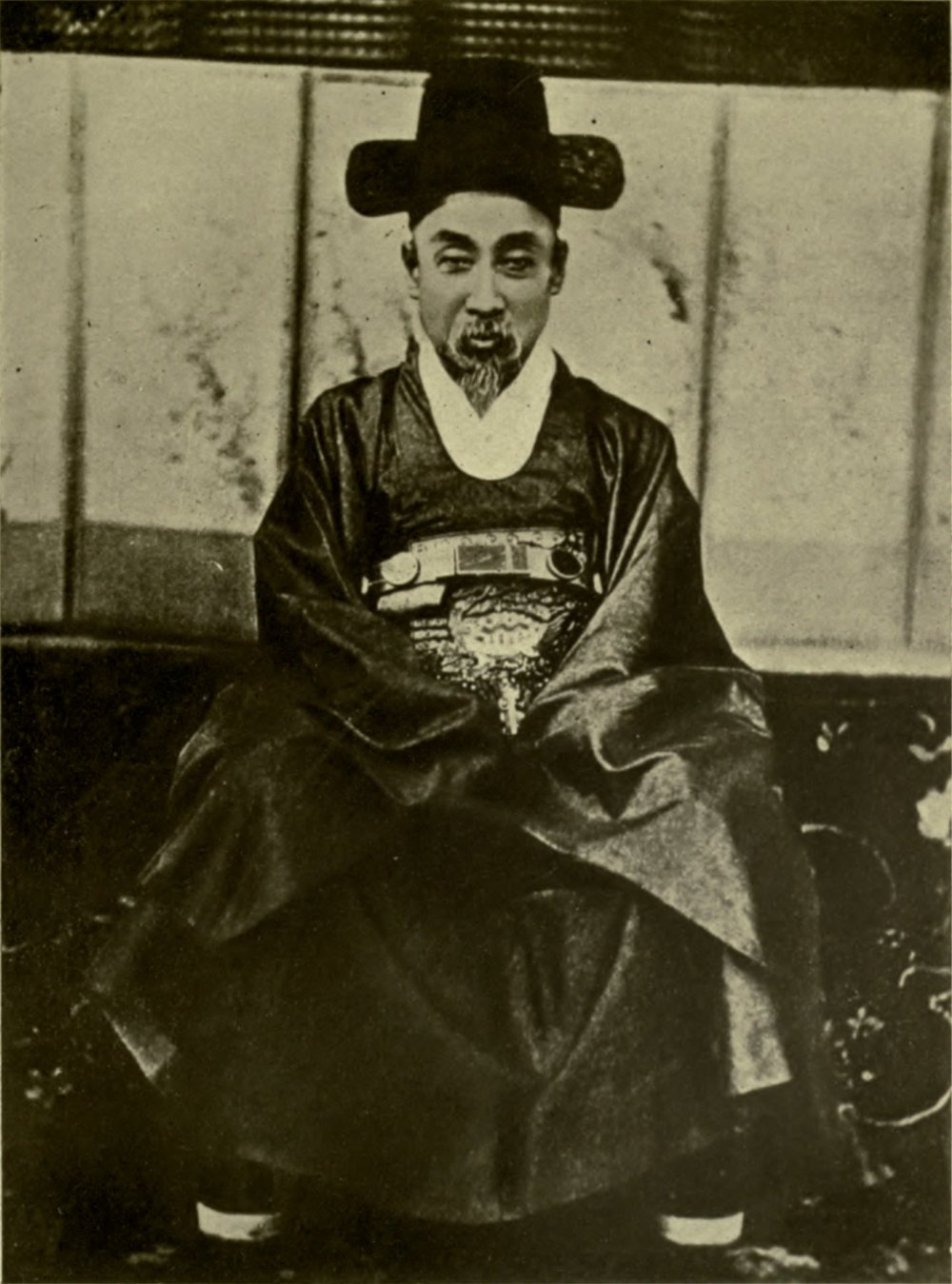
Great Regent Heungseon in 1869

In A History of Donghak, Oh Jiyeong claims that the Great Regent attempted a massacre of pro-Japanese politicians in August 1894, simultaneous with the time when Jeon had planned an attack on Seoul.

During his execution, Kim Gae-nam testified that Jeon had been secretly meeting the Great Regent Heungseon. However, the other four leaders refused to connect the Great Regent with the revolution.

=== Connections with Genyosha ===
The Japanese historian Seito argued that the Donghak Peasant Revolution had been backed by a Samurai group named Genyōsha, who landed in Busan on 27 June 1894. The claim is however heavily contended by Korean historians.

Seito's account is generally regarded as pseudohistorical by Korean historians. Jeon only had 20 followers at the beginning of the Gobu Revolt, compared with 600 in Seito's account. Also, Seito's list of battles and Jeon Bong-jun's account in the Jeon Bong-jun Gongcho are different. Additionally, Seito records that an alliance of rebels and Genyosha defeated governmental forces from June to August, in which Jeon would install Jibgangso agencies. However, certain Korean historians such as Yi Yihwa and Japanese historians generally regard Saito's account to be partially valid, especially as there was a large body of Japanese soldiers in Korea at the time.

In The Founding of Cheondoism, it is recorded that two Japanese men named Danaka Jiro and Dakeda Hanshi and their fifteen followers, holding dynamite, gave Jeon a gold watch and a horse and had a council with Jeon, which was done not with translation but by using written sentences (both knew Chinese characters). The Japanese asked Jeon to ally with Japan and drive out China to make Korea genuinely independent. Later, in 1895, Danaka attempted to free the imprisoned Jeon and take him to Japan, but Jeon refused, calling Japan "my enemy" and saying, "It is not my purpose to seek my petty life through the hands of an enemy." He also said, "I am your enemy, and you are my enemy." However, Jeon also asked the Genyosha to attempt to protect the rebels from execution.

The Great Regent Heungseon hired ronin, or former Samurai, to kill political enemies. It has also been speculated that it was Genyosha members who killed Empress Myeongseong, the last queen of Korea.

=== War crimes by Donghak rebels ===
The Donghak rebels committed heinous war crimes out of vengeance against the ruling castes. Due to the violent nature of the rebellion, Choi denied his direct involvement to Jeon and the peasant rebels. The war crimes were not only limited to arson and pillages, but also included frequent rapes and torture. This was well recorded in Ohagimun, which was written by Hwang Hyeon, a late Joseon scholar.

=== Controversy over compensation ===
Due to the war crimes and the rebellious and cultish nature of the rebellion, controversy arose in South Korea in 2026, due to a 2004 law passed by the local government of Jeollabuk-do that gives cash compensation to descendants of Tonghak rebels.

== In popular culture ==
=== Folk songs ===
The Donghak Peasant Revolution gave way to various folk songs. The most famous is the Oh Bird, Oh Bird, Oh Roller (the 'roller' being mentioned is the oriental dollarbird).

Oh bird, oh bird, oh roller

Do not sit in the Nokdu fields.

When the Nokdu flower falls

The jelly seller weeps.

Oh bird, oh bird, oh roller

Why did you come out

The pine and bamboo leaves are green.

We thought it was summer.

But it is freezing with snow.

In this song, the 'roller' are the Japanese soldiers (who wore blue uniforms). The 'Nokdu Fields' is Jeon Bong-jun, and 'When the Nokdu Flower Falls' is the execution of Jeon Bong-jun. The 'jelly sellers' are the peasants of Korea. 'Summer' refers to the Hucheon, the Donghak concept of Paradise, and 'winter' refers to the persecution of the rebels. 'Why did you come out' refers to the peasants' anger at foreign intervention. This song is sung all over Korea and seems to have been first sung at the execution of Jeon. There are many versions of this song, with different lyrics.

Another song was sung in September, at the revolution's zenith, but was soon forgotten after the fall of the rebels. This contrasts the Oh Bird, Oh Bird, Oh Roller above.

Gabose gabose

Eulmijeok georida

Byeongshin doemyeon

Byeongshin nanda

This is a wordplay. The first line, 'Gabo,' can mean 'Let us go' and '1894'. 'Eulmi' refers to 'slow' and '1895', and 'Byeongshin' refers to 'Destruction' and '1896'. This song's literal meaning is 'Let us go in 1894, for if we do not win by 1895, we shall be destroyed by 1896.'

==== Son Hwa-Jung and the Buddha's Navel ====
The Dosol Cliff Buddha has been connected to Son Hwa-jung and the rebels, and the legend surrounding it appears in the 1940 History of Donghak, meaning that the legend was already existent at the time. It is one of the few legends relating to the Donghak Peasant Revolution.

In 1820, a few days after Yi Seogu became governor of Jeolla, Yi went south to Seonun Temple, Mujang, to see what was inside the navel of the Stone Buddha of Dosol Cliff. But as he was opening the navel, thunder struck, he could not read the parchment inside but had to seal the navel again. He had only read the first line: "Yi Seogu, governor of Jeolla, will read this." No one dared read the parchment, for they feared the thunder.

In August 1893, in the Jeob of Jeongeub, there were words about the parchment of the Buddha. Son Hwajung said he would like to read it, if only for the thunder. Then, the believer Oh Hayeong said they should not worry about the lightning: "I hear that when such parchments are hidden, the hider casts lightning spells so that people cannot read it. I do not think anything will happen. The lightning spell will already have been cast when Yi Seogu attempted to open the seal, and the spell will have been gone. We must open it when it is time, and I shall take all responsibility."

So they gathered thousands of coils of ropes and hundreds of hammers, crushed the navel of the Buddha, and took out the parchment inside. They had imprisoned the Buddhists in fear of intervention, and they reported the Donghak believers to the government. That day, the magistrate of Mujang captured hundreds of Donghak believers, with Gang Gyeongjun, Oh Jiyeong, and Go Yeongsuk at their heads. The magistrate of Mujang ordered the Donghak believers to hand over the parchment and reveal the location of Son Hwajung. They were beaten and flogged until their bodies were hunks of flesh. But the parchment was with Son Hwajung to the north, as were the other leaders, and after ten days of torture, the three leaders were executed for murder and thievery, and the others were flogged and sent away.

Later stories claim that the parchment in question was a secret guideline on revolutions that was written by Chŏng Yagyong, a Silhak scholar, and that Jeon Bong-jun modeled the revolution after the book. Others claim that the parchment's destiny was to bring the downfall of the Joseon Dynasty.

The current Dosol Cliff Buddha has a squarely shaped hole in place of the navel.

=== Film ===
The 1991 film Fly High Run Far, directed by Im Kwon-taek, is set during the Revolution.

In 2019, SBS released Nokdu Flower, a historical fiction drama, directed and written by Shin Kyung-soo, Jung Hyun-Min, telling the story of the fictional Baek Yi-kang and his participation in the Donghak Peasant Revolution.

== See also ==
- Big suppression operation against South Korea
- Donghak Peasant Revolution Museum
- Gando massacre
- Hailan River massacre
- Hainan mass grave
- History of Korea
- Imperial Japanese massacre against March First Movement
- Japanese war crimes
- Shinhanchon massacre

== Bibliography ==
Books are sorted by author's family name, the last part in English, and the first part of a Korean name.

=== Specific books ===
- Yi, Yihwa (2012). 동학농민운동(평등과 자주를 외친) [The Donghak Peasant Revolution: Claiming for Equality and Statehood] (in Korean). illustrated by Kim Tae-Hyun. Seoul: Safari. p. 327. ISBN 9788-9648-0765-1.
- History Controversies Study Agency (1994). 다시 피는 녹두꽃 [The Nokdu Flower Blooms Again: Testimony of Donghak Peasant Descendants] (in Korean). 역사비평사, History Bipyeongsa. pp. 1–400. ISBN 9788-9769-6223-2. "학농민군 후손 60여인의 생생한 증언을 모았다"

=== Surveys ===
- Lone, Stewart; McCormack, Gawan (1993). Korea Since 1850. Australia: Longman Cheshire Pty Limited. p. 226. ISBN 9780-3120-9686-1.
- McClain, James L. (2002). Japan, a Modern History. New York: W.W. Norton & Company. pp. 1–724. ISBN 9780-3930-4156-9.
- Boulger, Demetrius Charles; Hazeltine, Mayo W. (1893). "The War with Japan and Subsequent Events". China. Kessinger Publishing (reprint 2010). pp. 1–550. ISBN 9781-1633-3067-8.

=== Other books ===
- Misang, John (1999a). 미상 [The Founding of Cheondoism] (in Korean).
- Misang, John (1999b). 미상 [Korean Folk Culture] (in Korean).
- South Korea government (1976). 미상 [Social Study Topographical Textbook] (in Korean). pp. 1–128.
- Choe, Sihyeong (1862). 용담 유사 : 수운 가사 [Yongdam Yusa] (in Korean). 대원 출판사, Daewon Publisher. ISBN 8972616087.
- 세종 출판 기획; Sejong Chulpan Kihoek (2000). 용담 유사 : 수운 가사 [Yongdam Yusa] (in Korean). 대원 출판사, Daewon Publisher. pp. 1–141. ISBN 9788-9726-1608-5.
- Hwang, Hyeon (1910). 오하기문 [Ohagimun] (in Korean). translated by 김종익 (1994?). 역사비평사, History Bipyeongsa. pp. 1–351. ISBN 8976962222. "매천(梅泉) 황 현이 19세기 당쟁.세도정치의 폐해, 동학농민전쟁, 일제 침략 항일의병활동 등 한시대를 묘파한 "오하기문" 번역서"
- Oh, Jiyeong (1987) [1940, Yeongchang Seogwan (?)]. 동학사(대광민속총서 1) [A History of Donghak] (in Korean). 대광문화사, Daekwang Cultural History. pp. 1–243. ISBN 9788-9705-1022-4.
- Yi, Deokil (1999). 미상 [A History of Controversies] (in Korean).
- Yi, Guytae (1894). Diary of the Reconnaissance Head of the South (in Korean).
- Yu, Eunshik. The Conservative Nature of the Rebellion of 1894 (in Korean).
- Yu, Hongjun (유홍준) (2011a). 남도 답사 일번지 [The First in the South]. 나의 문화 유산 답사기 [Exploring my Cultural Heritage] (in Korean). Vol. 1. Changbi. pp. 1–348. ISBN 9788-9364-7201-6.
- Yu, Hongjun (유홍준) (2011b). 산은 강을 넘지 못 하고 [Mountains Cannot Cross Rivers]. 나의 문화 유산 답사기 [Exploring my Cultural Heritage] (in Korean). Vol. 2. Changbi. pp. 1–466. ISBN 9788-9364-7202-3.

=== Manhwa (만화) and Books for Children ===
- Choe, Yongbeom (2007). 하룻밤에 읽는 한국사 [Reading Korean History in One Night] (in Korean). Seoul: Paper Road. pp. 1–426. ISBN 9788-9958-2663-8.
- Gwak, Eunju (2011). 최제우 동경대전(만화)(서울대선정 인문고전 50선 21) [Choe Jeu's Donggyeong Daejeon (Manhwa)] (in Korean). Junior Kim Yeongsa. pp. 1–215. ISBN 9788-9349-3327-4.
- Park, Eunbong (2009d). 한국사 편지. 4(12살부터 읽는 책과함께 역사편지) [ABC of Korean History (4)] (in Korean). 책과함께어린이, Books for Children. pp. 1–260. ISBN 9788-9912-2147-5.
- Park, Eunbong (2009e). 한국사 편지. 5(12살부터 읽는 책과함께 역사편지) [ABC of Korean History (5)] (in Korean). 책과함께어린이, Books for Children. pp. 1–300. ISBN 9788-9912-2148-2.
- Yu, Gyeong-won, 유경원 (2005). 이현세의 만화 한국사 바로보기. 9(조선시대) [Quick view of Yi Hyeonse Manhwas about Korean History. 9 (Joseon Dynasty)] (in Korean). 녹색지팡이, Noksaek Jipangi. pp. 1–235. ISBN 9788-9914-8109-1.
