= Jangseong County =

Coordinates: 35°18′06″N 126°47′05″E

Jangseong
- County
- Panoramic view of Jangseong-eup

- Flag Emblem of Jangseong

- Location in South Korea
- Country: South Korea
- Region: Honam
- Provincial-level city: Jeonnam-Gwangju
- Administrative divisions: 1 eup, 10 myeon

Area
  - Total: 518.65 km^{2} (200.25 sq mi)

Population (September 2024)
  - Total: 42,129
  - Density: 108/km^{2} (280/sq mi)
  - Dialect: Jeolla

Korean name
- Hangul: 장성군
- Hanja: 長城郡
- RR: Jangseong-gun
- MR: Changsŏng-gun

Jangseong County (Korean: 장성군) is a county in Jeonnam-Gwangju, South Korea.

Jangseong is in the southern region of the Korean peninsula and Gwangju and Naju is the nearest city from Jangseong. In Jeonnam-Gwangju, it is near the northern border of its province, meeting North Jeolla.

The Republic of Korea Army Armor School is located in the county.

== Symbols ==
- Flower : White poplar
- Tree : Maple
- Bird : Dove

== Administrative divisions ==
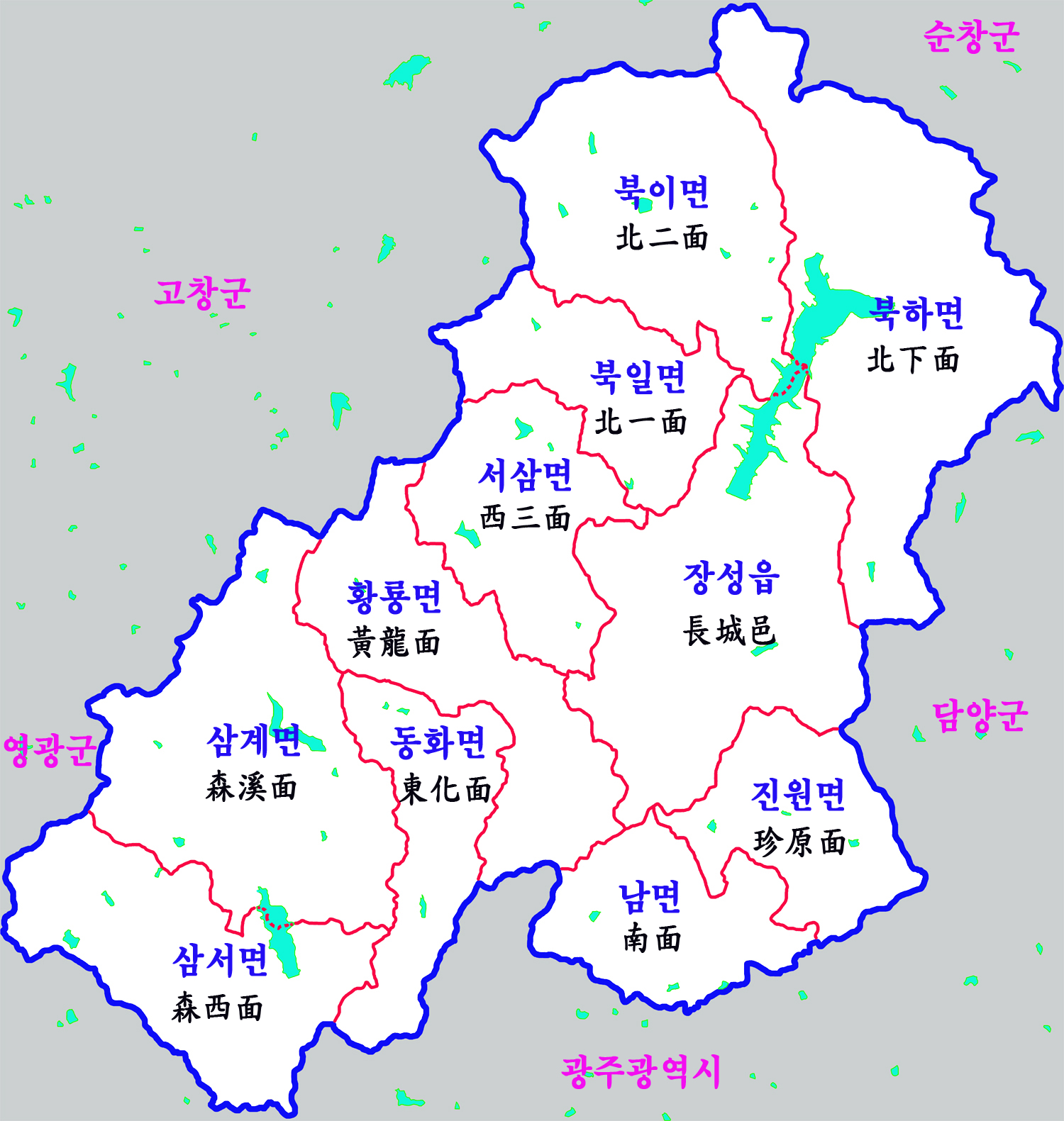
Administrative divisions of Jangseong-gun.

Jangseong-gun's administrative divisions consist of 1 town (eup), 10 townships (myeon), and 123 villages (ri). Jangseong-gun has an area of 518.5^{km2}, and as of March 31, 2011, the population has 20,840 households and 47,239 people.

Administrative divisions of Jangseong-gun (March 31, 2011)
Town (eup), townships (myeon)	Hanja	Households	Population	Area (km2)	Villages (ri)
Jangseong-eup (장성읍)	長城邑	5,848	13,556	69.5	Susan-ri, Seongsan-ri, Yutang-ri, Yeongcheon-ri, Dangwang-ri, Gisan-ri, Jangan-ri, Anpyeong-ri, Buheung-ri, Baekgye-ri, Yonggang-ri, Bongdeok-ri, Deokjin-ri, Sangori, Yaeun-ri, Yonggok-ri
Jiwon-myeon (진원면)	珍原面	1,441	3,335	28.3	Yulgok-ri, Sanjeong-ri, Seonjeok-ri, Hakjeon-ri, Jinwon-ri, Sandong-ri, Hakrim-ri, Sangrim-ri, Yongsan-ri
Nam-myeon (남면)	南面	1,767	3,819	28.4	Bunhyang-ri, Nokjin-ri, Deokseong-ri, Maryeong-ri, Pyeongsan-ri, Haengjeong-ri, Woljeong-ri, Samtae-ri, Wolgok-ri
Donghwa-myeon (동화면)	東化面	1,509	3,096	28.8	Yongjeong-ri, Dongho-ri, Seoyang-ri, Gurim-ri, Nampyeong-ri, Namsan-ri, Wolsan-ri, Guryong-ri, Songgye-ri
Samseo-myeon (삼서면)	森西面	1,509	3,096	47.5	Daegok-ri, Samgye-ri, Yupyong-ri, Hakseong-ri, Daedo-ri, Soryong-ri, Suhae-ri, Uchi-ri, Geumsan-ri, Seokmari, Bosung-ri, Duwol-ri, Hongjeong-ri, Suyang-ri
Samgye-myeon (삼계면)	森溪面	2,810	7,192	66	Sachang-ri, Wolyeon-ri, Jusan-ri, Sangdo-ri, Neungseong-ri, Balsan-ri, Suok-ri, Deoksan-ri, Susan-ri, Jukrim-ri, Saengchon-ri, Buseong-ri, Hwasan-ri, Singi-ri, Naegye-ri
Hwangryeong-myeon (황룡면)	黃龍面	2,015	4,687	44.7	Wolpyeong-ri, Waryong-ri, Okjeong-ri, Hwangryong-ri, Sinho-ri, Jangsan-ri, Piram-ri, Agok-ri, Geumho-ri, Tongan-ri, Maekho-ri, Gwandong-ri, Wau-ri
Seosam-myeon (서삼면)	西三面	780	1,728	34.1	Jangsan-ri, Songhyeon-ri, Moam-ri, Daedeok-ri, Chuam-ri, Geumgye-ri, Yongheung-ri
Bukil-myeon (북일면)	北一面	776	1,655	30.6	Sinheung-ri, Baksan-ri, Osan-ri, Wolgye-ri, Seongsan-ri, Seongdeok-ri, Munam-ri
Buki-myeon (북이면)	北二面	1,536	3,282	56.4	Sageo-ri, Wondeok-ri, Sinpyeong-ri, Dalseong-ri, Baekam-ri, Jukcheong-ri, Manmuri, Sinwol-ri, Mohyeon-ri, Suseong-ri, Owol-ri, Joyang-ri
Bukha-myeon (북하면)	北下面	1,370	2,527	84.2	Wolseong-ri, Daeak-ri, Danjeon-ri, Yongdu-ri, Yaksu-ri, Jungpyeong-ri, Seongam-ri, Daeheung-ri, Deokjae-ri, Donghyeon-ri, Ssangung-ri, Shinsung-ri
Jangseong-gun (장성군)	長城郡	20,840	47,239	518.5	123 villages in total

== Places of Interest ==
=== Baegyangsa Temple ===
A head temple of the Jogye Order of Korean Buddhism, Baegyangsa (백양사; 白羊寺) was established in 632 AD by the great Zen Master Yeohwan (여환선사; 如幻禪師). Originally named Baegamsa (백암사; 白巖寺), it was renamed Jeongtosa (정토사; 淨土寺) in 1034 by the monk Jungyeon (중연; 中延), who spearheaded a reconstruction of the temple. It got its current name after the mid-Joseon period. The renowned Seon Buddhist nun and chef, Jeong Kwan, lives in the temple. Visitors can also participate in its Templestay program.

=== Piram Seowon ===
Founded in 1590 to commemorate a local scholar and civil servant Kim In-hu (김인후; 金麟厚, 1510–1560), Piram Seowon [ko] (필암서원; 筆巖書院) was burned down in 1597 during the Imjin War. It was rebuilt in 1624, and in 1662, King Hyeongjong personally gave a plaque containing the temple's name. In 1672 it moved to its current location. Besides being a designated Historic Site of Korea, it is also one of the nine seowons that was recognized as a UNESCO World Heritage Site on July 6, 2019.

This seowon is built in the Jeonhakhumyo (전학후묘; 前學後廟) form, where the study area is located in the front, and the area for performing ancestral rites are at the back. A number of old documents are stored here, from records of students and personnel to woodblock print collections of cultural property status.

=== Ibamsanseong Fortress ===
Built on the mountain Ibamsan (626m), the exact founding of Ibamsanseong Fortress [ko] (입암산성; 笠岩山城) is unclear, although it is first mentioned in the History of Goryeo, where, in 1256 during the Mongol invasions of Korea, General Song Gunbi [ko] (송군비; 宋君斐, ?-1270) who was in charge of this fortress, successfully defeated the Mongols. The fortress was rebuilt in 1409 during King Taejong's reign, and later it underwent several modifications to allow its defenders to hold out for an extended period of time. Today, 3.2 km of the fortress remains.

=== Jangseong Hwangryong Battle Site ===
This is the site of the Battle of Hwangryong River, part of the Donghak Peasant Revolution. From 1994, the county government began building a memorial park in commemoration of the 100th anniversary of the revolution, and in 1997 it was opened to the public, being designated as National Historic Site No. 406 in 1998. There is also a monument to Lee Hak-seung, a general of the government troops who was killed in action.

=== Hong Gil-dong Theme Park ===
This theme park introduces visitors to Hong Gil-dong, who was assumed to be born in Jangseong-gun. Facilities include an archery range, an exhibition hall, 4D theater, futsal field, a camping site for both tents and vehicles, a hanok, a store and a restaurant.

=== Namchang Valley ===
At four kilometers long, this large valley consists of six smaller valleys; within its vicinity lies Ibamsanseong Fortress and Baegyangsa Temple. Waterfalls and oddly-shaped rocks dot its hiking trail. During summer, it is popular with hikers as they immerse themselves in nature.

=== Chungnyeongsan Cypress Forest ===
The area around Chungnyeongsan (축령산; 祝靈山), a mountain which height is 620.5m, saw a successful afforestation project under Chunwon (춘원; 春園) Im Jung-guk (임종국; 林種國, 1915–1987), who in 1956 began to plant trees at the foot of the mountain, entirely at his own expense. His determination endured even in the face of a severe drought in 1968. Eventually, nearby villagers volunteered to help him, and over the course of 20 years approximately 1,150 hectares of land had turned into a cypress forest, with over 2.5 million trees being planted by him alone. After dying from illness, his body was buried here. The Korea Forest Service purchased the forest in 2002 and has maintained it ever since. Because of his actions, Chungnyeongsan is now a famous tourist attraction, with a folk village and tourist farm built at the entrance. Nearby villages also benefit from increased tourism.

In 2024, a changgeuk performance depicting Im Jung-guk's life story and his dedication to the forest was held at Jangseong Cultural Arts Center, to raise awareness of sustainable regional development.

== May 2014 fire ==
A fire at a 397-bed hospital, which had opened in 2007 in Jangseong was the scene of a major fire just after midnight on 28 May 2014. Twenty one patients and a nurse died in the fire, while several more people were injured.

== Twin towns – sister cities ==
Jangseong is twinned with:

- Jung-gu, South Korea
- Haman County, South Korea
- Gwacheon, South Korea
