= Donghak Peasant Revolution Museum =

History museum in Jeongeup, South Korea

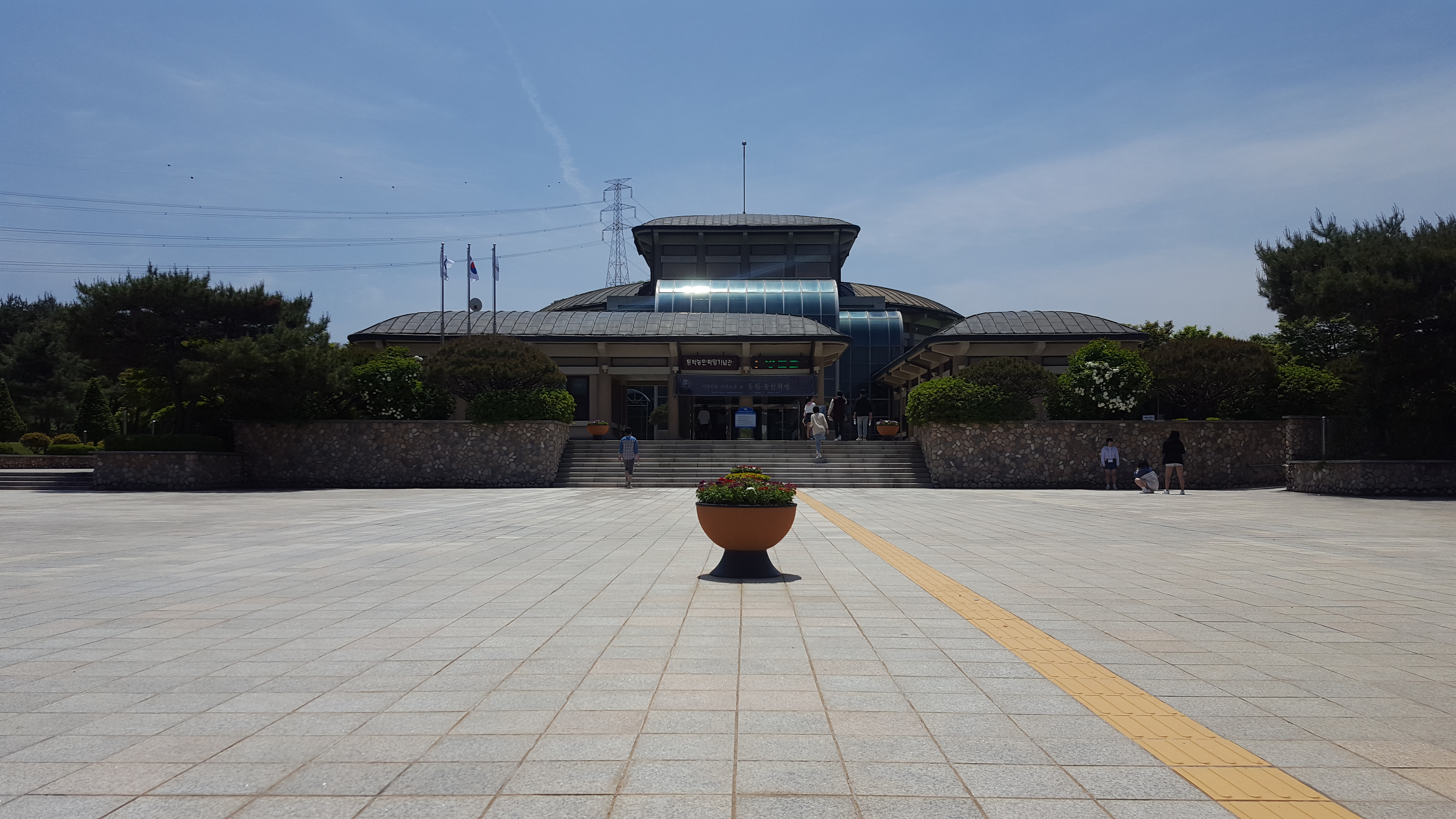
- The hall in 2018
- Location: 742, Donghak-ro, Jeongeup, Deokcheon-myeon, North Jeolla Province, South Korea
- Coordinates: 35.63036°N 126.83004°E
- Type: History museum
- Website: www.1894.or.kr/eng/ (in English)

The Donghak Peasant Revolution Museum (Korean: 동학농민혁명기념관) is a history museum on the 1894–1895 Donghak Peasant Revolution, located in Jeongeup, North Jeolla Province, South Korea. It was founded on May 11, 2004. It was managed by the North Jeolla Province government until January 2011, until the Donghak Peasant Revolution Foundation took over the role.

The museum is closed on Mondays, admission is free, and parking is available on-site.
