= Battle of Hwangtojae =

Donghak Peasant Revolution conflict

- Part of Donghak Peasant Revolution
Date	April 6–7, 1894
Location	Hwangtojae, Jeolla, Korea
Result	Rebel Victory

Belligerents
Donghak Peasant Army	Kingdom of Joseon: Joseon Army

Commanders and leaders
Jeon Bong-jun; Son Hwa-jung; Kim Gae-nam	Yi Gyeong-hyo †

Strength
10,000: 4,000 rebels engaged	Jeolla Provincial Army: 2,000: 300 Elite Soldiers

Casualties and losses
Minimal	Reported: 1,000; Actual: 200

The Battle of Hwangtojae (Korean: 황토현전투; Hanja: 黃土峴戰鬪) was a battle during the Donghak Peasant Revolution which occurred in 1894 Korea (the 31st year of King Gojong's reign). The Donghak Peasant Army achieved a significant victory in the battle against the Jeolla Gamyeong Army.

== Background ==
On March 20, 1894, Jeon Bong-jun and Kim Gae-nam went south to Mujang, where they met Son Hwa-jung. Jeon announced a proclamation in Mujang, Jeolla Province, marking the start of a full-scale peasant uprising. The rebels properly organized in Mujang, and on 20 March the 4,000 rebels of Mujang, Jeolla Province, turned towards Mount Baek, Gobu. While camped in Mount Baek, the army grew to tens of thousands. Choe Deokyeong and Choi Gyeong-seon's 300 peasants who were stationed in Jae-san Village, and several hundred peasant soldiers gathered at the horse market, and together they occupied Gobu Gwan-a, a government office and Gobu Pass and gradually strengthened their forces. Here, the aphorism came: "When sitting, a white mountain; when standing, a bamboo mountain". (rebels mostly wore white, and used bamboo spears. The term may have appeared earlier, however, as Mount Juk, meaning 'bamboo mountain', could only be seen when standing, as it was covered by smaller Mount Baek, 'white mountain'.) On 22 March the rebels destroyed the reservoir and burned down governmental offices and storages.

After occupying Gobu Gwan-a, the peasant soldiers stayed there for four days. They demolished the government's arsenals and carried out reforms, and on March 25, they advanced to Baeksan. Baeksan was a small hill less than 50 meters high located north of Gobu Gwan-a, but it was a fortress that provided a clear view of the surrounding grain-producing areas. While the peasant soldiers were encamped at Baeksan, peasant soldiers from neighboring towns such as Geumju, Buan, and Gochang gathered one after another. As a result, the peasant army expanded and reorganized its camp, appointing Jeon Bong-jun as the commander-in-chief, Son Hwa-jung and Kim Gae-nam as generals, and Choi Gyeong-seon as an administrative officer.

From March 26 to 29, they declared the "Honam Changyi Headquarters" and established Jeon Bong-jun as the overall commander and Son Hwa-jung (1861-1895) and Kim Gae-nam (1853-1895) as deputy commanders.

The rebels camped for four days in Gobu, and new rebels joined them every day. After making Jeon Bong-jun as the leader and Kim Gae-nam and Son Hwa-jung as generals, the rebels occupied Taein (1 April) and Buan (4 April). They also announced the "Four Great Principles" (Sadaemyeongui) to clarify their intentions and posted proclamations (gikmun) throughout the country to actively seek the support of the people.

1. Do not kill the innocent and refrain from eating farm animals.
2. Open the Hucheon through loyalty and piety and appease the people.
3. Defeat every single barbarians of Japan and purify the holy land.
4. Drive the army into Seoul and kill every member of the Min family.

The rebels also "did not seek alcohol and women and did not smoke tobacco". They did not forcefully take food, but paid for them in money.

== Pursuing the rebels ==
Meanwhile, when the Jeolla Gamsa (local magistrate) Kim Mun-hyun heard the news that the Donghak peasant soldiers had occupied Gobu and gathered at Baeksan, he immediately reported it to the central government and ordered the military and civil officials in Jeonju to guard the west and south gates of Jeonju Castle. Meanwhile, preparations were made to strengthen the defense of Jeonju Castle, and the Jeolla Provincial Army (Kamyeonggun (감영군 (監營軍)) was mobilized. They had a total of around 2,000 soldiers, including 300 elite troops from Munamyeong. They consist of 700 soldiers from the Munam Camp and about 600 conscripts led by Bo Bu-sang and Yi Gyeonghyo advanced through Wonpyeong and Taein and reached the vicinity of Baeksan. Furthermore, he mobilized the troops of the Munam Camp (a military camp established in 1893) under the command of Yi Gyeong-ho and led a mixed force of artillery units that had come from various towns to block the advance of the Donghak peasant soldiers along the Geumgu Road.

On April 3, the Jeolla Gamyeong Army moved towards Gumgu direction to intercept the peasant army. Upon hearing this news, the peasant army of 4,000 led by Jeon Bong-jun changed direction again, heading towards Taein. The main force of the peasant army spent the night of April 3 in Taein, leaving only a small force as a deterrent, and then moved to Buan. On April 4, they captured Buan Pass and opened the arsenal to strengthen their weaponry, they changed their route towards Jeonju and encamped at Seonghwangsan, which was close to the border area between Buan and Gobu.

== Battle ==
On a cloudy April 6, the main force of the peasant army left Buan and headed towards Gobu, while the remaining peasant army in Taein also moved towards Gobu. They had agreed to meet at Hwangtohyeon, a strategic location connecting Taein and Gobu, located west of Dokyosan.

The first engagement took place around 4 p.m. When the peasant army encountered the Jeolla Provincial Army, they pretended to be defeated and retreated from Hwangtohyeon, turning their formation towards the southern foothills of Shirubong. As Yi's forces pursued them and reached Hwangtohyeon, night fell and further advancement became impossible. They decided to camp there. Gam Yeong was unfamiliar with the geography of the area, and coincidentally, the rain had just stopped, shrouding the area in dense fog. Underestimating the strength of the peasant army, Yi and his troops leisurely enjoyed the evening, even slaughtering cattle and drinking alcohol.

Initially, the peasant army pretended to retreat as if they were defeated. When the peasant army retreated to the Maegyo Bridge in Gobu, the Jeolla Provincial Army pursued them. In response, the peasant army pretended to be defeated again and climbed up the mountains called the yellow earth embankment. The Jeolla Provincial Army continued to pursue and encamped near the yellow earth embankment. While the two forces were facing each other, it became dark, and April 6 came to an end. In this tense standoff, the peasant army, waited for the right moment. The governmental soldiers charged into the rebel camp, but found it empty. At around 4 a.m. on April 7, the peasant army, hiding on the yellow earth embankment under the cover of fog, launched a surprise attack by firing cannons on the defenseless Jeolla Provincial Army camped under the hill at around 4 a.m. on April 7th. The Jeolla Supervisory Division was caught off guard, causing confusion and chaos. The peasant army chased the disoriented Jeolla Provincial Army and achieved victory in the first encounter with the government forces by killing military officer Yi Gyeong-ho and many other commanding officers while some fled. The peasant army chased the disoriented Jeolla Provincial Army and achieved victory in the first encounter with the government forces by killing military officer Yi Gyeong-ho and many other commanding officers while some fled.

The "Ogahimun" records the battle situation at that time as follows:

"At this time, it was already dark, and both sides were inspecting their camps, not moving, only the sound of war cries could be heard. As the night grew deeper, the enemy (peasant army) camp became silent, and the war cries ceased. The government army was puzzled and cut down pine trees to make torches. When they set fire to the camp, it was as bright as daylight. However, outside the camp, smoke filled the air, and the thick fog made it impossible to see in all directions. Suddenly, war cries were heard, and when shells fell at their feet, the government soldiers fell like trees being cut down and collapsed. The enemy surrounded them on three sides, leaving only the west open, and they shouted loudly, exerting pressure. The government army collapsed instantly. By then, the day was already bright and the fog had lifted, so the enemy, who were wearing white clothes as ordinary soldiers recruited from the local area, did not pursue them, but they relentlessly pursued those wearing black clothes as soldiers and those with red stamps on their backs, biting their teeth and wielding their swords as if they were settling personal vendettas. In the wide fields below the mountains, where the spring plowing had just been completed and water had been collected, it seemed distant. The fleeing soldiers jumped into the water, but it was deep and muddy, and they struggled and floundered, and their blood dyed the ground red, staining the water in the fields. The military supplies abandoned by the government army filled the road."

== Aftermath ==
In this battle, the government army suffered more than 1,000 casualties. Prominent officials such as Yeonggwan Lee Gun-yang, Taeeun Bobusang Liu Byeong-jik, and Secretary Lee Dun-seong were all killed, while officials like Lee Jae-seop, Yu Su-geun, Jung Chang-kwon, and Baek Nak-yu all fled. However, it seems exaggerated, and the actual number is estimated to be around 200. The Hwangtohyeon Battle boosted the morale of the Donghak peasant soldiers and significantly diminished the morale of the government forces, thus influencing the course of the Donghak Peasant Uprising. It was a major defeat for the government army and the first victory for the peasant army.

=== Legacy ===
The victory at Hwangtohyeon Battle became a significant turning point in the First Donghak Peasant War. Not only did the peasant army's morale soar after defeating the government army in the first battle, but it also served as a catalyst for ordinary peasants who had been observing the uprising to join the ranks of the rebellion. In fact, after the battle, the peasant army's strength grew quantitatively and qualitatively until they eventually captured Jeonju Castle.

== See also ==
- Donghak Peasant Revolution
- Jeon Bong-jun

== Works cited ==
- Yi, Yihwa (2012). 동학농민운동(평등과 자주를 외친) [The Donghak Peasant Revolution: Claiming for Equality and Statehood] (in Korean). illustrated by Kim Tae-hyun. Seoul: Safari. p. 327. ISBN 9788-9648-0765-1.
- Park, Eunbong (2009d). 한국사 편지. 4(12살부터 읽는 책과함께 역사편지) [ABC of Korean History (4)] (in Korean). 책과함께어린이, Books for Children. pp. 1–260. ISBN 9788-9912-2147-5.
