= Honam =

Region in South Korea

Korean name
- Hangul: 호남
- Hanja: 湖南
- RR: Honam
- MR: Honam

Honam (Korean pronunciation: [ho.nam]; literally "south of the lake") is a region coinciding with the former Jeolla Province in what is now South Korea. Today, the term refers to Jeonnam-Gwangju, Jeju Province and Jeonbuk State. The name "Jeonla-do" is used in the names of the Honam Line and Honam Expressway, which are major transportation corridors connecting Seoul and Daejeon to the Honam region. The name is often used to refer to people residing in the region. There is also Honam University, which is located in Gwangju, the biggest city in Honam.

Electorally, Honam is a strong liberal region, voting strongly for Democratic Party candidates. During Park Chung Hee's reign, Yeongnam became heavily industrialized, whilst Honam was relatively neglected, remaining more underdeveloped. In addition, Gwangju was the site of the 1980 anti-government uprising and has cemented itself as an anti-authoritarian stronghold.

== See also ==
- Jeonnam-Gwangju
- Jeonbuk State
- Regions of Korea
- Yeongnam
