= Religion in South Korea =

Religion in South Korea (Public Opinion Survey 2025)
1. No religion (51%)
2. Protestantism (20%)
3. Catholicism (11%)
4. Buddhism (16%)
5. Other religions (1%)

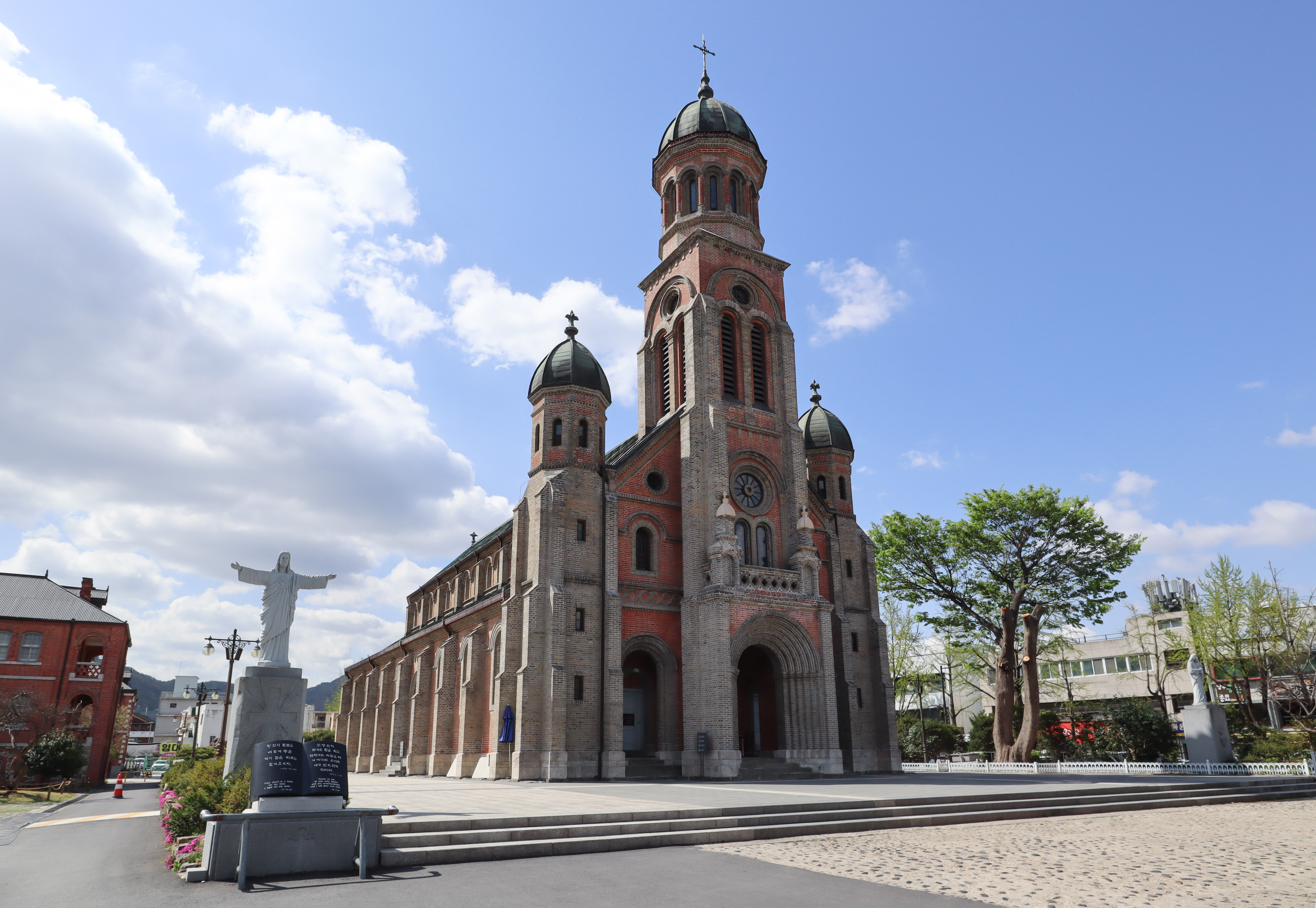
The Jeondong Cathedral in Jeonju, North Jeolla.

A majority of South Koreans are irreligious. Christianity (Protestantism and Catholicism) and Buddhism are the dominant confessions among those who affiliate with a formal religion.

According to the results of the 2025 edition of the Korea Research "Public Opinion in Public Opinion" survey, 51% of South Koreans report having no religion; 31% identify with Christianity (20% with Protestantism and 11% with Catholicism); 16% identify with Buddhism; and 1% identify with other religions.

Buddhism was influential in ancient times, while Christianity influenced large segments of the population in the 18th and 19th centuries. However, the two traditions grew most rapidly in membership in the mid-20th century, as South Korean society underwent profound transformations. Since 2000, both Buddhism and Christianity have been declining in adherents. Native shamanic religions (namely, Korean shamanism) remain popular and may account for a large share of the seemingly irreligious. Indeed, according to a 2012 survey, only 15% of the population identified as nonreligious in an atheistic sense. According to the 2015 census, the prevalence of irreligion among South Koreans is highest among youth—about 64.9% among then-20-year-olds.

Korea entered the 20th century with a well-established Christian presence, but most of the population practiced native Korean shamanism. The latter tradition never attained the status of a national religious culture comparable to Chinese folk religion, Vietnamese folk religion, or Japanese Shinto; the weakness of Korean shamanism was one of the reasons Christianity became deeply rooted early on. A large share of the population also took part in Confucian rites and held private ancestor worship ceremonies. Adherence to organized religions and philosophies was largely limited to the ruling elites, which, when coupled with the extensive patronage exerted by the Chinese empire, allowed elites to embrace a particularly strict interpretation of Confucianism (namely, Korean Confucianism). Korean Buddhism, despite having an erstwhile rich tradition, was virtually extinct as a Korean religious institution at the dawn of the 20th century, after 500 years of suppression by the Joseon kingdom. Christianity had followers in the Korean peninsula as early as the 18th century, when the philosophical school of Seohak supported the religion. With the fall of the Joseon in the last decades of the 19th century, the population largely embraced Christianity, as the monarchy and Korean intellectuals looked to the West as a model for modernizing the country and endorsed the work of Catholic and Protestant missionaries. During Japanese colonisation in the first half of the 20th century, the linking of Christianity with Korean nationalism was further reinforced by opposition to the Japanese effort to merge native Korean shamanism with State Shinto.

Mostly Christian divisions. Mostly Buddhist divisions.

With the division of Korea into two states after 1945, the North and the capitalist South, the majority of the Korean Christian population, which had been centered in the northern half of the peninsula, fled to the nascent South Korea. It has been estimated that Christians who migrated to the south numbered more than one million. Throughout the second half of the 20th century, the South Korean state enacted measures to further marginalise indigenous Korean shamanism; the measures further strengthened Christianity and fostered a revival of Buddhism. According to scholars, South Korean censuses do not count believers in indigenous Korean shamanism and underestimate the number of adherents of Korean shamanism sects.

Some observers suggest that the significant drop in the number of adherents of religions such as Catholicism and Buddhism between the 2005 and 2015 censuses is due to changes in survey methods. The 2005 census involved a comprehensive analysis of the entire population, using traditional data sheets completed by each family. In contrast, the 2015 census primarily used the internet and surveyed only about 20% of the South Korean population as a sample. Critics argue that this shift disadvantaged rural populations, who tend to be more Buddhist and Catholic and less internet-versed, while benefiting urban Protestant groups with better internet access. Both Buddhist and Catholic communities have criticized the results of the 2015 census.

== Demographics ==
religion	1950–1962		1985		1995		2005		2015	
religion	num.	%	num.	%	num.	%	num.	%	num.	%
Christianity (overall)	—N/a	5−8%	—N/a	20.7%	11,390,000	26.0%	13,461,000	29.2%	13,566,000	27.6%
(Protestantism)	—N/a	2.8%	—N/a	16.1%	8,505,000	19.4%	8,446,000	18.3%	9,676,000	19.7%
(Catholicism)	—N/a	2.2%	—N/a	4.6%	2,885,000	6.6%	5,015,000	10.9%	3,890,000	7.9%
Buddhism	—N/a	2.6%	—N/a	19.9%	10,154,000	23.2%	10,588,000	22.8%	7,619,000	15.5%
other	—N/a	92.4%	—N/a	2.1%	—N/a	1.2%	—N/a	1%	—N/a	—N/a
non-religious	—N/a	—N/a	—N/a	57.3%	—N/a	49.6%	—N/a	47.2%	—N/a	56.9%

The percentage of religious beliefs by region in Korea (2025)
Administrative area	Protestantism	Catholicism	Buddhism	Other	No religion
Seoul	22%	13%	13%	1%	51%
Incheon/Gyeonggi	21%	12%	12%	1%	53%
Daejeon/Sejong/South Chungcheong Province	21%	10%	15%	1%	53%
Gwangju/Jeolla	25%	11%	11%	2%	51%
Daegu/North Gyeongsang	17%	10%	23%	1%	49%
Busan/Ulsan/South Gyeongsang	13%	7%	29%	1%	49%
Gangwon/Jeju	16%	16%	18%	1%	49%
Korea National	20%	11%	16%	1%	51%

=== Religious affiliation by age (2025) ===
Age	Protestantism	Catholicism	Buddhism	Other religions	No affiliation
18–29	13%	5%	8%	2%	72%
30–39	15%	8%	12%	2%	64%
40–49	18%	10%	14%	2%	56%
50–59	20%	10%	19%	1%	50%
60–69	24%	15%	22%	1%	39%
Above 70	29%	19%	21%	2%	29%
Other religions include Won Buddhism, Confucianism, Cheondoism, Daesun Jinrihoe, Daejongism, and Jeungsanism.

=== Religious affiliation by gender (2025) ===
	Protestantism	Catholicism	Buddhism	Other religions	No affiliation
Male	18%	10%	16%	1%	55%
Female	22%	12%	17%	2%	47%
Other religions include Won Buddhism, Confucianism, Cheondoism, Daesun Jinrihoe, Daejongism, and Jeungsanism.

== History ==
=== Before 1945 ===
Before the introduction of Buddhism, all Koreans believed in their indigenous religion socially guided by mu (shamans). Buddhism was introduced from the Chinese Former Qin state in 372 to the northern Korean state of Goguryeo and developed into distinctive Korean forms. At that time, the peninsula was divided into three kingdoms: the aforementioned Goguryeo in the north, Baekje in the southwest, and Silla in the southeast. Buddhism reached Silla only in the 5th century, but it was made the state religion only in that kingdom in the year 552. Buddhism became much more popular in Silla and even in Baekje (both areas now part of modern South Korea), while in Goguryeo the Korean indigenous religion remained dominant. In the following unified state of Goryeo (918–1392) Buddhism flourished, and even became a political force.

The Joseon kingdom (1392–1910), adopted an especially strict version of Neo-Confucianism (i.e. Korean Confucianism) and suppressed and marginalised Korean Buddhism and Korean shamanism. Buddhist monasteries were destroyed, and their number dropped from several hundreds to a mere thirty-six; Buddhism was eradicated from the life of towns as monks and nuns were prohibited from entering them and were marginalised to the mountains. These restrictions lasted until the 19th century.

In the late 19th century, the Joseon state was politically and culturally collapsing. The intelligentsia was looking for solutions to invigorate and transform the nation. It was in this critical period that they came into contact with Western Christian missionaries who offered a solution to the plight of Koreans. Christian communities had already existed in Joseon since the 17th century; however, it was only by the 1880s that the government allowed a large number of Western missionaries to enter the country. Christian missionaries set up schools, hospitals and publishing agencies. The royal family supported Christianity.

As the Japanese tried to impose State Shinto during the absorption of Korea into the Japanese Empire (1910–1945), the already formed link of Christianity with Korean nationalism was strengthened, co-opting within it native Korean shamanism, and Christians refused to take part in Shinto rituals. At the same time, numerous religious movements that since the 19th century had been trying to reform the Korean indigenous religion, notably Cheondoism, flourished.

=== 1945–2015 ===
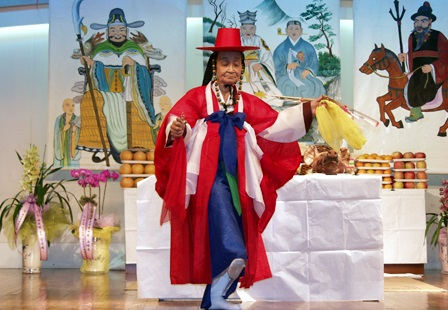
A mudang holding a gut to placate the angry spirits of the dead.

With the division of Korea into two states in 1945, the communist north and the anti-communist south, the majority of the Korean Christian population that had been until then in the northern half of the peninsula, fled to South Korea. Christians who resettled in the south were more than one million. Cheondoists, who were concentrated in the north like Christians, remained there after the partition, and South Korea now has no more than few thousands Cheondoists.

The so-called "movement to defeat the worship of gods" promoted by governments of South Korea in the 1970s and 1980s prohibited indigenous cults and wiped out nearly all traditional shrines (sadang 사당/祠堂) of the Confucian kinship religion. This was particularly tough under the rule of Park Chung Hee, who was a Buddhist. This measure, combined with the rapid social changes of the same period, favoured a rapid revival of Buddhism, as it traditionally intermingled with folk religion and allowed a way for these traditional believers to express their folk beliefs in the context of an officially accepted religion. This period also saw the growth of Christian churches in a trend to register as members of organized religions.

The number of Buddhist temples rose from 2,306 in 1962 to 11,561 in 1997, Protestant churches rose from 6,785 in 1962 to 58,046 in 1997, the Catholic Church had 313 churches in 1965 and 1,366 in 2005, Won Buddhism had 131 temples in 1969 and 418 in 1997. Similarly, Daesun Jinrihoe's temples have grown from 700 in 1983 to 1,600 in 1994. Statistics from censuses show that the proportion of the South Korean population self-identifying as Buddhist has grown from 2.6% in 1962 to 22.8% in 2005, while the proportion of Christians has grown from 5% in 1962 to 29.2% in 2005. However, both religions have shown a decline between the years 2005 and 2015, with Buddhism sharply declining in influence to 15.5% of the population, and a less significant decline of Christianity to 27.6%.

According to Pew Research Center (2010), about 46% of the population had no religious affiliation, 23% are Buddhist and 29% are Christians. According to 2015 national census, 56.1% are irreligious, Protestantism represents 19.7% of the total population, Korean Buddhism 15.5%, and Catholicism 7.9%. A small percentage of South Koreans (0.8% in total) are members of other religions, including Won Buddhism, Confucianism, Cheondoism, Daesun Jinrihoe, Islam, Daejongism, Jeungsanism and Eastern Orthodox Christianity.

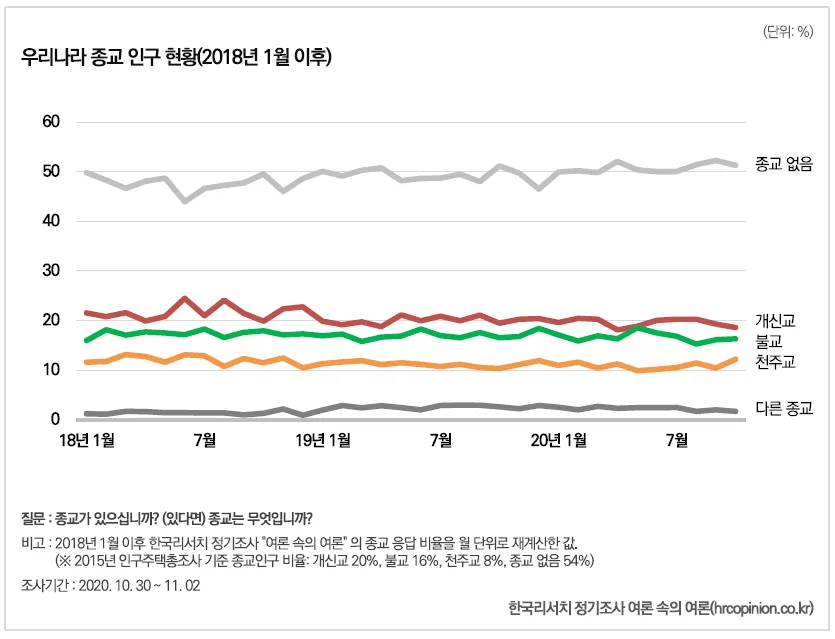
Study performed by a South Korean Research Journal revealing the change in religion demographics from 2018 to 2020.

=== 2015–present ===
In response to the rapidly changing demographics of religion in South Korea, Yeolon Sog-ui Yeolon (Korean: 여론 속의 여론) a Korean research journal, performed a survey on the present religious demographic in South Korea. According to the survey, new results deviate from the traditional sentiments of South Korean culture. While much of the population is irreligious, Protestants make up the largest religious group. The latter half of the population that are religious, are split in the following way: 20% believe in Protestantism, 16% believe in Buddhism, 13% believe in Catholicism, and 1% believe in other religions or cults. Essentially, the studies findings show that 50% of South Koreans are now non-religious, 32% follow some section of Christianity, 16% are Buddhist, and 2% believe in some other form of religion. The deviation from the traditionally religious South Korean culture and demographics is the rise of atheism.

Previous to this sudden change, A Cohort Analysis of Religious Population Change in Korea launched by the Korean Citation Index analyzed South Korean religious demographics from 1999 to 2015. The data from the study focused on understanding religious conversion, switching, or abandonment within the demographic. Today, the study has given insight on the potential effects of the deviation in South Korea's religious demographic.

The study performed by the research journal, Yeolon Sog-ui Yeolon, discovered that the change in the South Korean religious demographics stemmed from the youth. The younger demographic of South Korea tend to have a higher percentage of atheists, while the older demographics have remained relatively religious. The study states that 33% of South Koreans who are around the age of 20 believe in religion, while above 61% of those aged 60 or older continue to believe in religion. The study also reveals that the demographic of believers and non believers are also affected by many more variables. For example, the specific religion and the age at which the religion was introduced to the individual can have effects on the probability of an individual to stay religious throughout their lives. Overall, there seems to be a large deviation between those who were introduced to religion before elementary and those who were introduced after their 50s. Of 101 individuals interviewed, 29 were introduced to religion before elementary school, 18 during elementary, 9 in their 40s, and 7 in their 50s. While Catholicism and Protestantism maintained a similar standard deviation, believers of Buddhism seemed to start during and near their 30s. With the younger generation of South Korea remaining increasingly non-religious and South Korea traditionally being a religious nation, the developments of South Korea's religious demographics will have many implications on the nation's culture, politics, and way of life.

=== Fundamentalist Protestant attacks on traditional religions ===
From the 1980s to the late 2000s, there have been acts of hostility committed by fundamentalist Protestants against Buddhists and followers of traditional religions in South Korea. This include the arson of temples, the beheading of statues of Buddha and bodhisattvas, and red Christian crosses painted on either statues or other Buddhist and other religions' properties. Some of these acts have even been promoted by churches' pastors.

== Dominant religions ==
=== Buddhism ===
Buddhist expansion in Asia: Mahayana Buddhism first entered the Chinese Empire (Han dynasty) through Silk Road during the Kushan Era. The overland and maritime "Silk Roads" were interlinked and complementary, forming what scholars have called the "great circle of Buddhism".

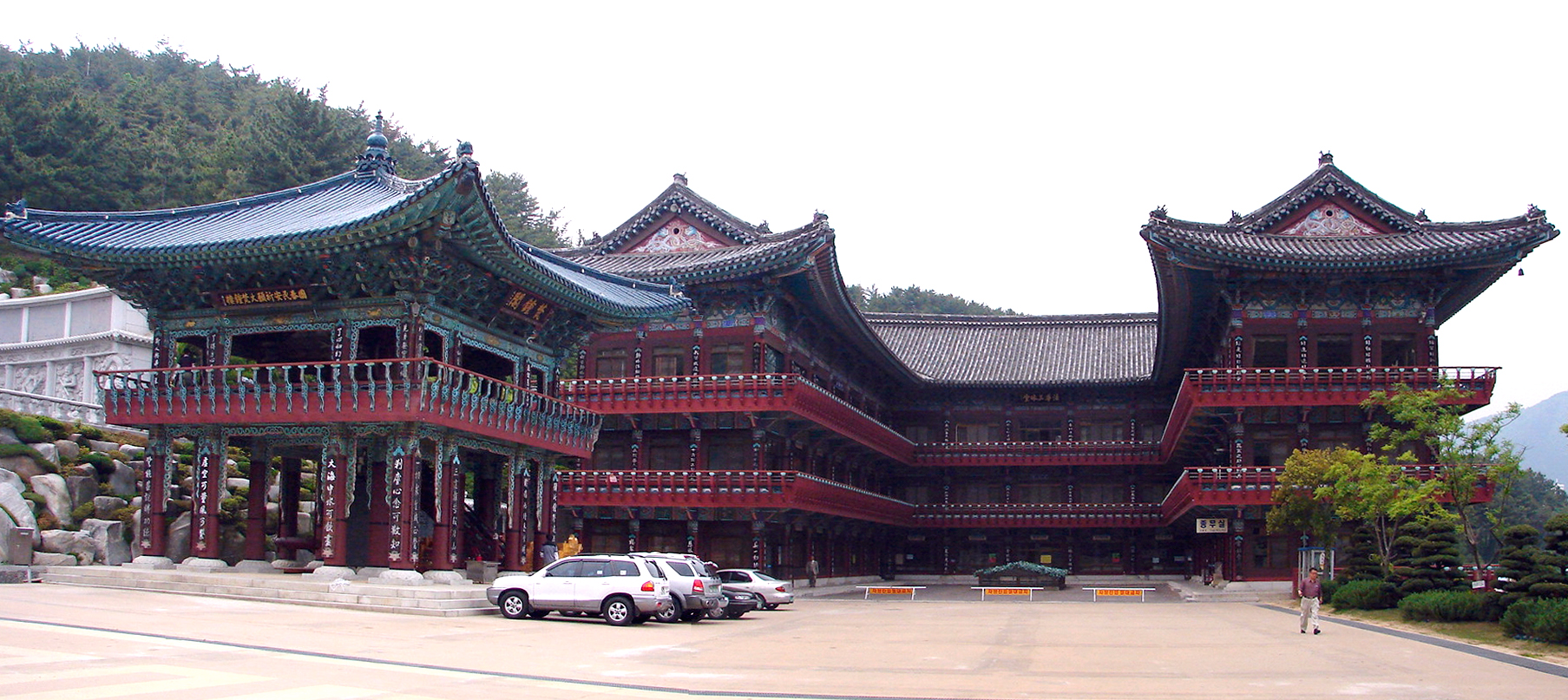
A building of the Samgwangsa (temple built in 1969) in Busan.

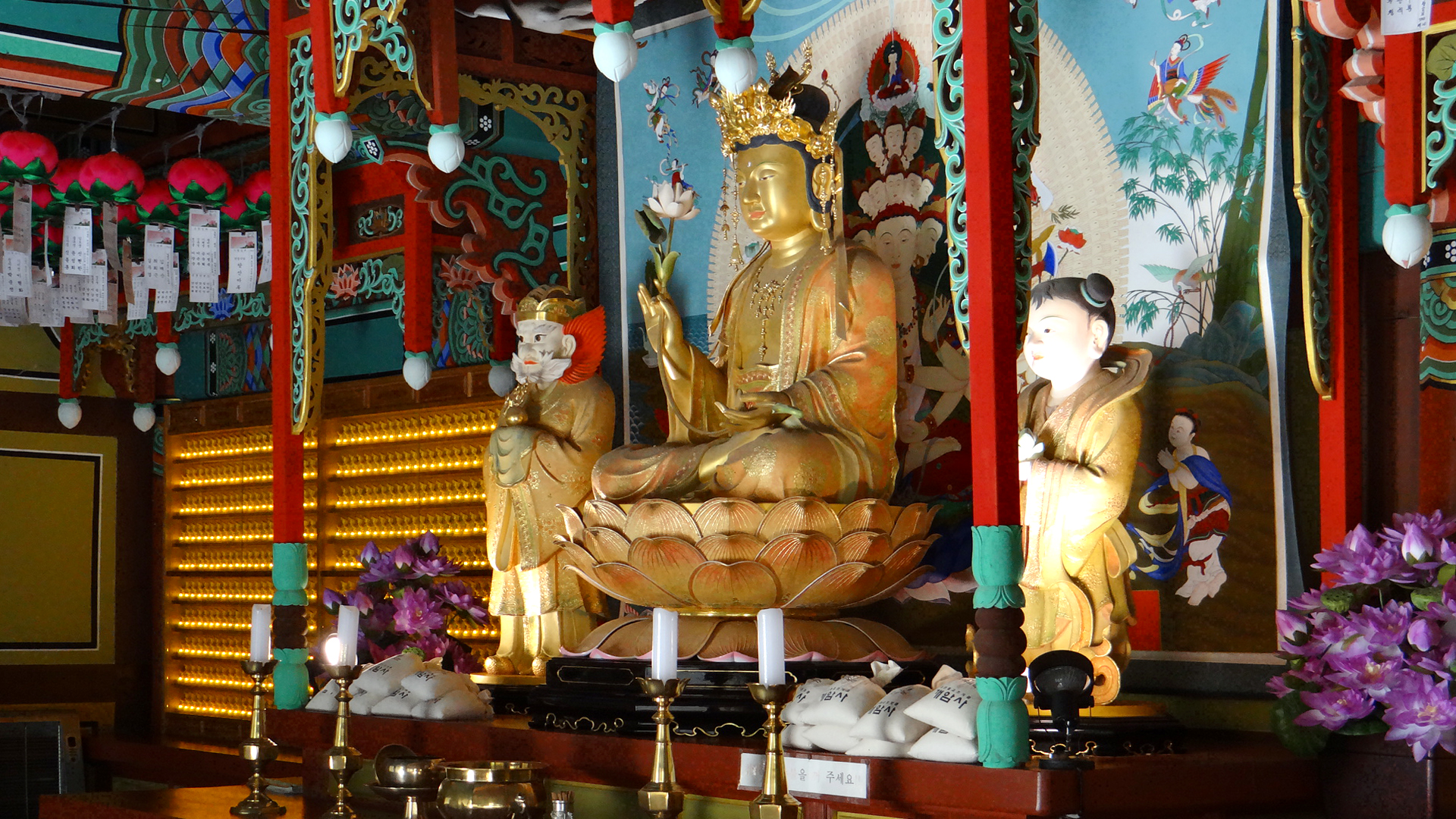
bodhisattva altar in the Gaeamsa, Buan County, North Jeolla Province.

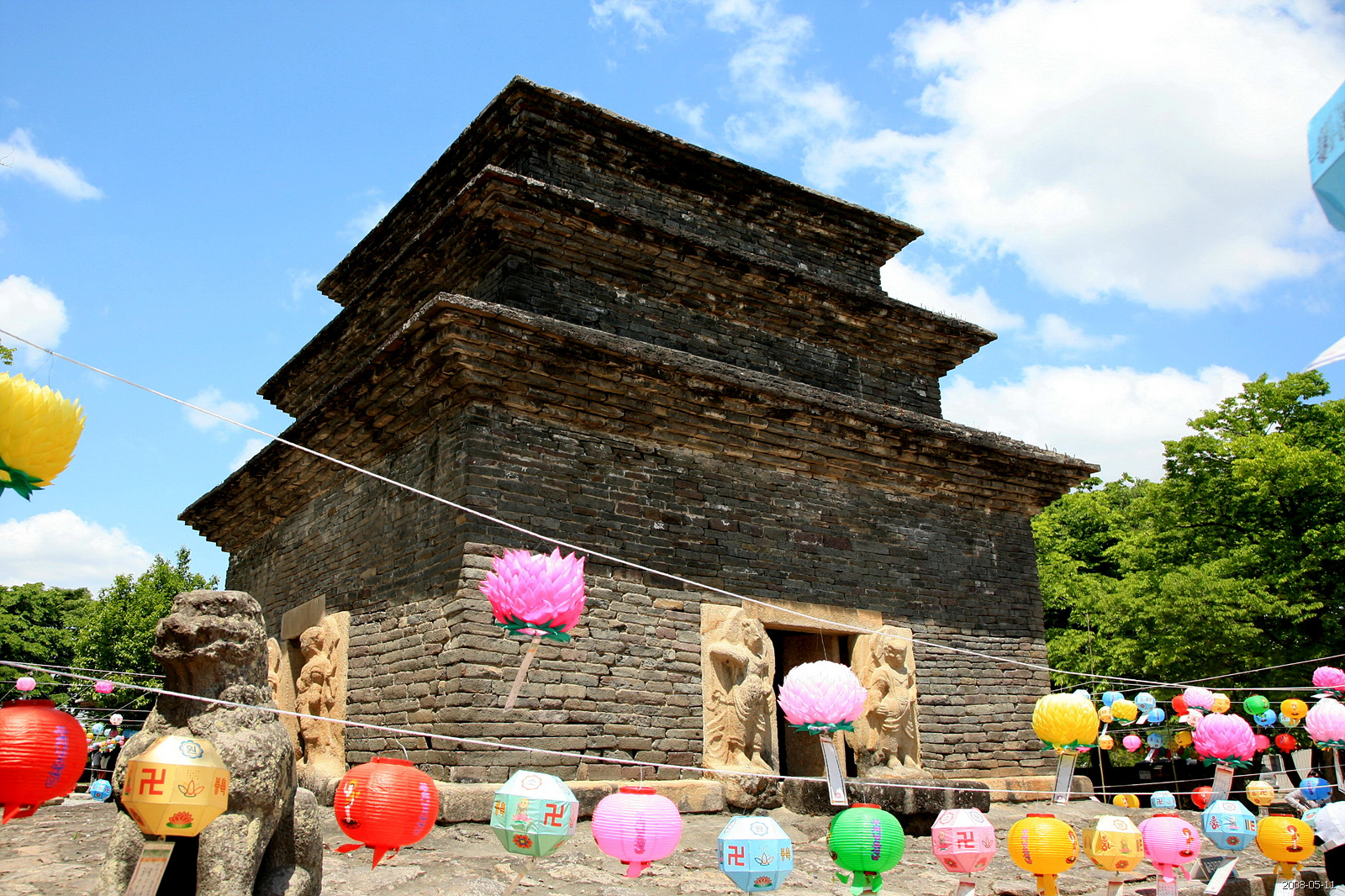
Three-storey stone pagoda of Bunhwangsa in Gyeongju, North Gyeongsang Province.

==== Arrival and spread since 4th century ====
Buddhism entered Korea from China during the period of the three kingdoms (372, or the 4th century). Buddhism was the dominant religious and cultural influence in the North–South States Period (698–926) and subsequent Goryeo (918–1392) states. Confucianism was also brought to Korea from China in early centuries, and was formulated as Korean Confucianism in Goryeo. However, it was only in the subsequent Joseon kingdom (1392–1910) that Korean Confucianism was established as the state ideology and religion, and Korean Buddhism underwent 500 years of suppression. Buddhism in the contemporary state of South Korea is stronger in the east of the country, namely the Yeongnam and Gangwon regions, as well as in Jeju.

==== Denominations ====
===== Korean Zen or Seon Buddhism =====
There are a number of different schools in Korean Buddhism (대한불교; 大韓佛敎; Daehanbulgyo), including the Seon (Korean Zen). Seon is represented by Jogye Order and Taego Order. The overwhelming majority of Buddhist temples in contemporary South Korea belong to the dominant Jogye Order, traditionally related to the Seon school. The order's headquarters are at Jogyesa in central Seoul, and it operates most of the country's old and famous temples, such as Bulguksa and Beomeosa. Jogye requires their monastics to be celibate. Taego lineage is a form of Seon (Zen) and it differs from Seon by allowing priests to marry.

===== Jingak and Cheontae Buddhism =====
Jingak Order, is a modern esoteric form of Vajrayana Buddhism, which also permits its priests to marry. Cheontae is a modern revival of the Tiantai lineage in Korea, focusing on the Lotus Sutra. Cheontae orders requires their monastics to be celibate.

===== Won Buddhism =====
Won Buddhism is a modern reformed Buddhism that seeks to make enlightenment possible for everyone and applicable to regular life. The scriptures and practices are simplified so that anyone, regardless of their wealth, occupation, or other external living conditions, can understand them.

==== Growth: Number of temples by denomination ====
907 major Korean Buddhist temples by school (2005)
School	Temples
Jogye Order (조계종; 曹溪宗)	735 (81%)
Cheontae Order (천태종; 天台宗)	144 (16%)
Taego Order (태고종; 太古宗)	102 (11%)
Beobhwa Order (법화종; 法華宗)	22 (2%)
Seonhag-won (선학원; 禪學院)	16 (2%)
Wonhyo Order (원효종; 元曉宗)	5 (1%)
Other	27 (3%)

==== Buddhism's syncretic influence on Korean culture ====
According to a 2005 government survey, a quarter of South Koreans are practicing Buddhist. However, the actual number of Buddhists in South Korea is ambiguous as there is no exact or exclusive criterion by which Buddhists can be identified, unlike the Christian population. With Buddhism's incorporation into traditional Korean culture, it is now considered a philosophy and cultural background rather than a formal religion. As a result, many people outside of the practicing population are deeply influenced by these traditions. Thus, when counting secular believers or those influenced by the faith while not following other religions, the number of Buddhists in South Korea is considered to be much larger. Similarly, in officially atheist North Korea, while Buddhists officially account for 4.5% of the population, a much larger number (over 70%) of the population are influenced by Buddhist philosophies and customs.

=== Christianity ===
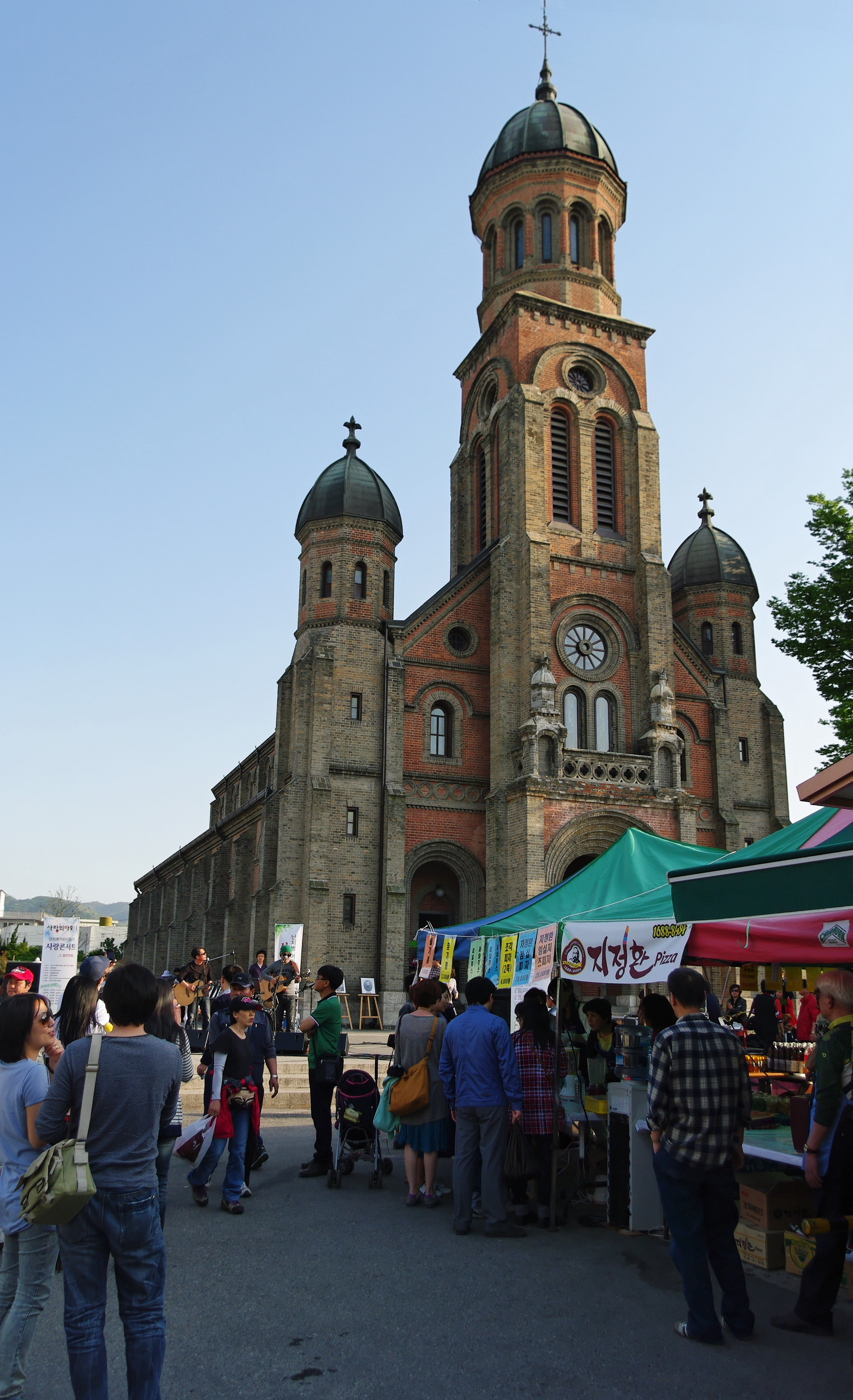
Jeondong Catholic Church in Jeonju, North Jeolla Province.

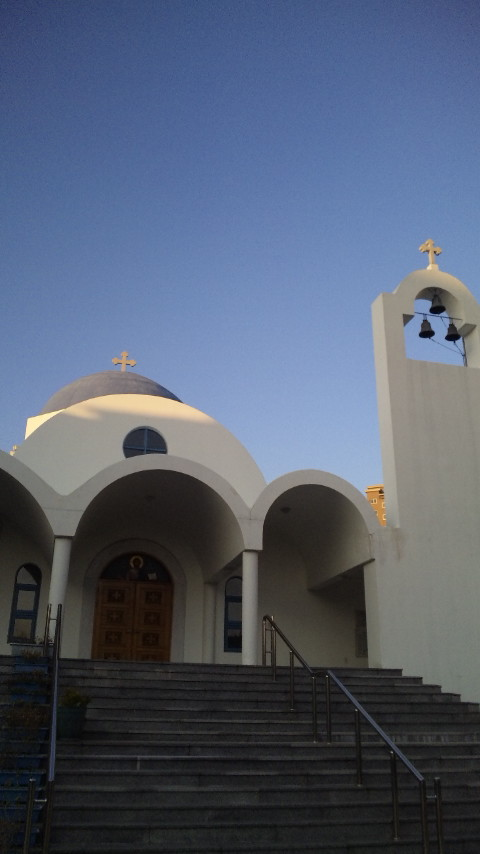
Saint Dionysios Orthodox Church in Ulsan.

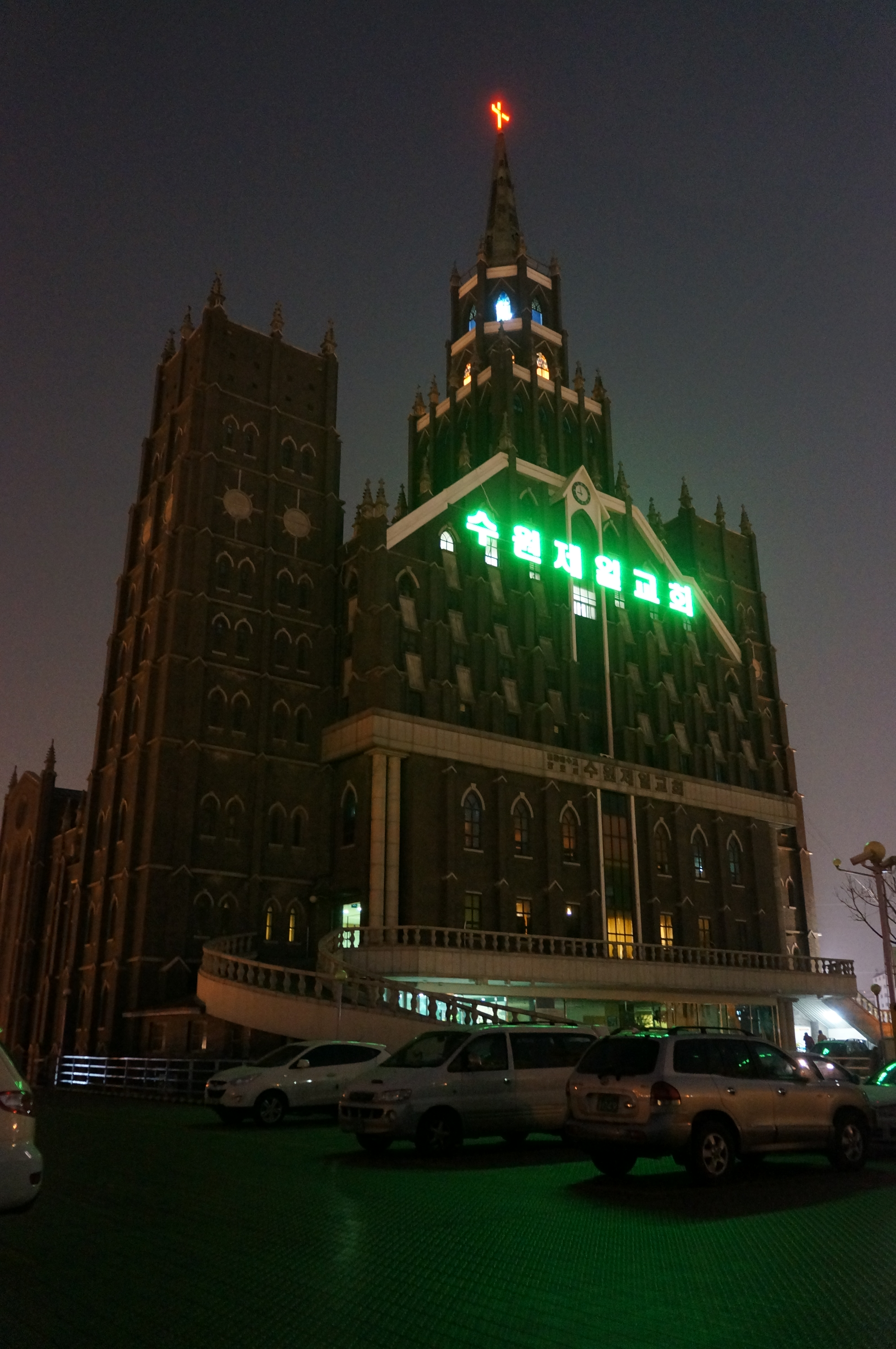
Jeil Presbyterian Church of Suwon, in Gyeonggi Province, by night.

==== Arrival in late 18th century ====
Foreign Catholic missionaries did not arrive in Korea until 1794, a decade after the return of Yi Sung-hun, a diplomat who was the first baptised Korean in Beijing. He established a grass roots lay Catholic movement in Korea. However, the writings of the Jesuit missionary Matteo Ricci, who was resident at the imperial court in Beijing, had been already brought to Korea from China in the 17th century. Scholars of the Silhak ("Practical Learning") were attracted to Catholic doctrines, and this was a key factor for the spread of the Catholic faith in the 1790s.

==== Denominations ====
Christianity in South Korea is dominated by four denominations: Catholic, Presbyterianism, Methodism and Baptists. The Yoido Full Gospel Church is the largest Pentecostal church in the country. Some non-denominational churches also exist. According to 2015 census, Protestants and Catholics numbered 9.6 million and 3.8 million respective. There are also small Eastern Orthodox communities.

===== Catholicism =====
The penetration of Western ideas and Christianity in Korea became known as Seohak. A study of 1801 found that more than half of the families that had converted to Catholicism were linked to the Seohak school. Largely because converts refused to perform Confucian ancestral rituals, the Joseon government prohibited Christian proselytising. Some Catholics were executed during the early 19th century, but the restrictive law was not strictly enforced. A large number of Christians lived in the northern part of the peninsula (it was part of the so-called "Manchurian revival") where Confucian influence was not as strong as in the south. Before 1948 Pyongyang was an important Christian centre: one-sixth of its population of about 300,000 people were converts. Following the establishment of the communist regime in the north, an estimated more than one million Korean Christians resettled to South Korea to escape persecution by North Korea's anti-Christian policies. Catholicism in Korea grew significantly during the 1970s to 1980s.

===== Protestantism =====
Protestant missionaries entered Korea during the 1880s and, along with Catholic priests, converted a remarkable number of Koreans, this time with the support of the royal government which winked at Westernising forces in a period of deep internal crisis (due to the waning of centuries-long patronage from a then-weakened China). The lack of a national religious system compared to those of China and that of Japan (Korean shamanism never developed to a high status of institutional and civic religion) gave a free hand to Christian churches. Methodist and Presbyterian missionaries were especially successful. They established schools, universities, hospitals, and orphanages and played a significant role in the modernisation of the country.

The Anglican Church of Korea is also a Protestant denomination. Unlike other Protestant denominations in Korea, it is influenced by Commonwealth realms such as Church of England, Scottish Episcopal Church, Anglican Church of Canada, Anglican Church of Australia, Anglican Church in Aotearoa, New Zealand and Polynesia rather than North American missionaries. They concentrate on harmonisation of Traditional Korean Architecture and European Architecture such as Ganghwa Anglican Church and usually invest on School and supporting minorities such as labourers and LGBT in Korea.

===== Eastern and Oriental Orthodoxy =====
Eastern Orthodox Church missionaries entered Korea from Russia in 1900. In 1903, the first Eastern Orthodox church in Korea was established. However, the Russo-Japanese War in 1904 and the Russian Revolution in 1917 interrupted the activities of the mission. After the North's army abducted Korea's only Orthodox priest at the time, Fr. Alexi Kim, at the start of the Korean War in 1950, and after the St. Nicholas Church building was destroyed by the 1951 bombing of Seoul, the small flock of Orthodox faithful was at risk of annihilation. In 1955, the Orthodox faithful of Korea wrote a letter to the Holy Synod of the Ecumenical Patriarchate asking to come under the Ecumenical Patriarchate's spiritual care and jurisdiction. Their request was granted, and the development and growth of the Church in Korea began to accelerate. Today, the roughly 5,000 Orthodox faithful of Korea remain under the Ecumenical Patriarchate of Constantinople, whose Holy Synod elevated the flourishing Church in Korea in 2004 to the status of a "Metropolis." The non-Chalcedonian Coptic Church of Alexandria was first established in Seoul in 2013 for Egyptian Copts and Ethiopians residing in South Korea.

===== Other Christians =====
The Church of Jesus Christ of Latter-day Saints in South Korea was established following the baptism of Kim Ho Jik in 1951, which had 81,628 members in 2012 with one temple in Seoul, four Mormon missions (Seoul, Daejeon, Busan, and Seoul South), 128 congregations, and twenty-four family history centres.

There are an estimated 2 million South Koreans who attend fringe churches not recognized by the Christian Council of Korea, the Communion of Churches in Korea and the Council of Denomination Heads for Korean Church Unity.

Sun Myung Moon's Unification Church is a new religious movement founded in South Korea in 1954 by Sun Myung Moon, which has financed many organizations and businesses in news media, education, politics and social activism. In 2003, Korean Unification Church members started a political party named "The Party for God, Peace, Unification, and Home".

World Mission Society Church of God, Victory Altar, Shincheonji Church, Christian Gospel Mission (also known as JMS or Providence), Grace Road Church and Evangelical Baptist Church of Korea are other Korean new religious movements that originated within Christianity. Other fringe Christian churches include the Manmin Central Church.

==== Causes of growth of Christianity ====
Factors contributing to the growth of Catholicism and Protestantism included the decayed state of Korean Buddhism, the support of the intellectual elite, and the encouragement of self-support and self-government among members of the Korean church, and finally the identification of Christianity with Korean nationalism. Christianity grew significantly in the 1970s and 1980s. In the 1990s and 2000s it continued to grow, but at a slower rate. Christianity is especially dominant in the west of the country including Seoul, Incheon, and the regions of Gyeonggi and Honam.

==== Opposition to syncretic traditions ====
Fundamentalist Protestants continue to oppose the syncretic aspects of the culture including Confucian traditions and ancestral rites practiced even by secular people and followers of other faiths. Consequently, several Korean Protestants have abandoned these native Korean traditions. Fundamentalist Protestants in Korea have a history of attacking Buddhism and other traditional religions of Korea with arson and vandalism of temple and statues, some of these hostile acts have been promoted by the church.

After the ban on traditional civil rites was lifted by Pope Pius XII in 1939, many Korean Catholics openly observe jesa (ancestral rites); the Korean tradition is very different from the institutional religious ancestral worship that is found in China and Japan and can be easily integrated as ancillary to Catholicism. Some Protestants continue to observe it, however, others have completely abandoned the practice.

== Indigenous religions ==
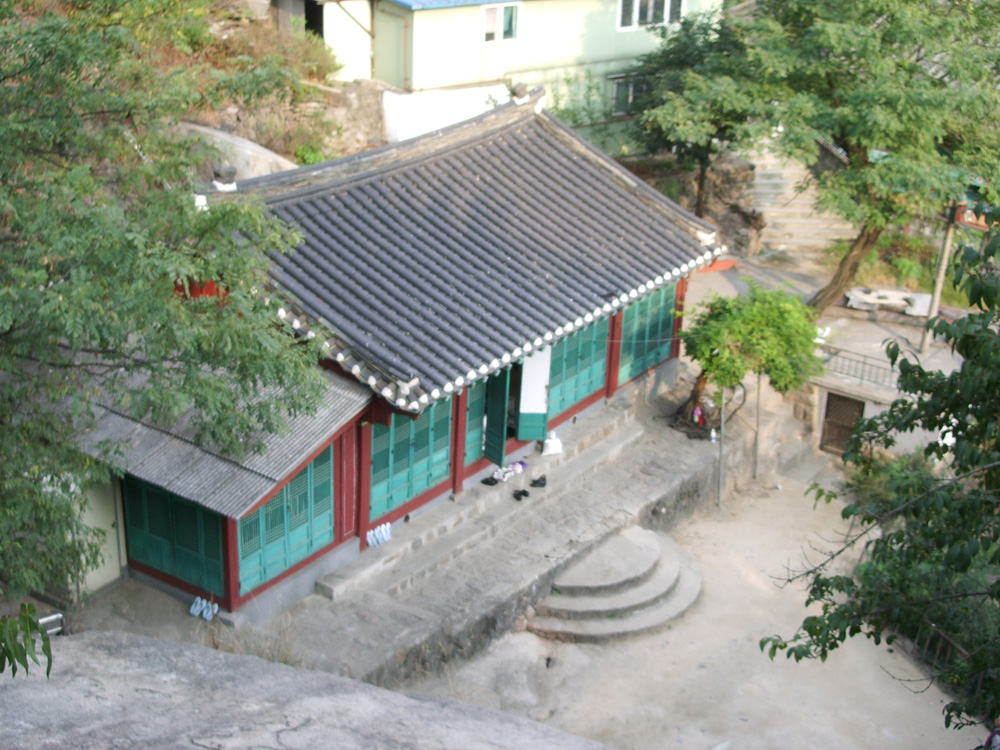
A Korean shamanic shrine at Inwangsan.

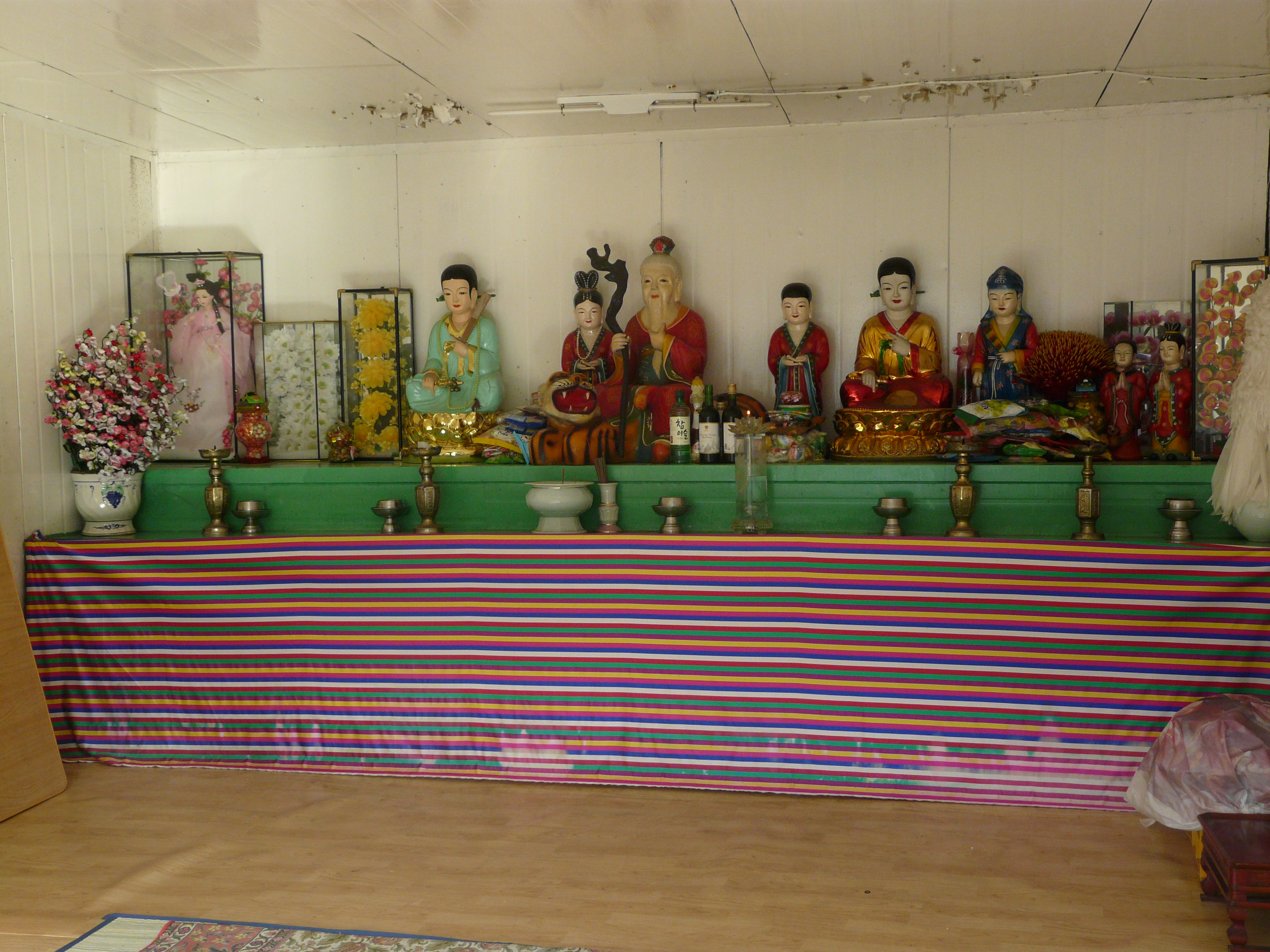
Inner altar of a Korean shamanism shrine, Ansan.

=== Korean shamanism ===
Korean shamanism, also known as Muism (Korean: 무교; Hanja: 巫敎; RR: Mugyo), and Musok (무속; 巫俗) is the native religion of the Koreans. (Note: Cognates of Japanese Shinto and Chinese Shendao.) Although used synonymously, the two terms are not identical: Jung Young Lee describes Muism as a form of Korean shamanism — the shamanic tradition within the religion. Particularly akin to Japan's Shinto, contrariwise to it and to China's religious systems, Korean shamanism never developed into a national religious culture.

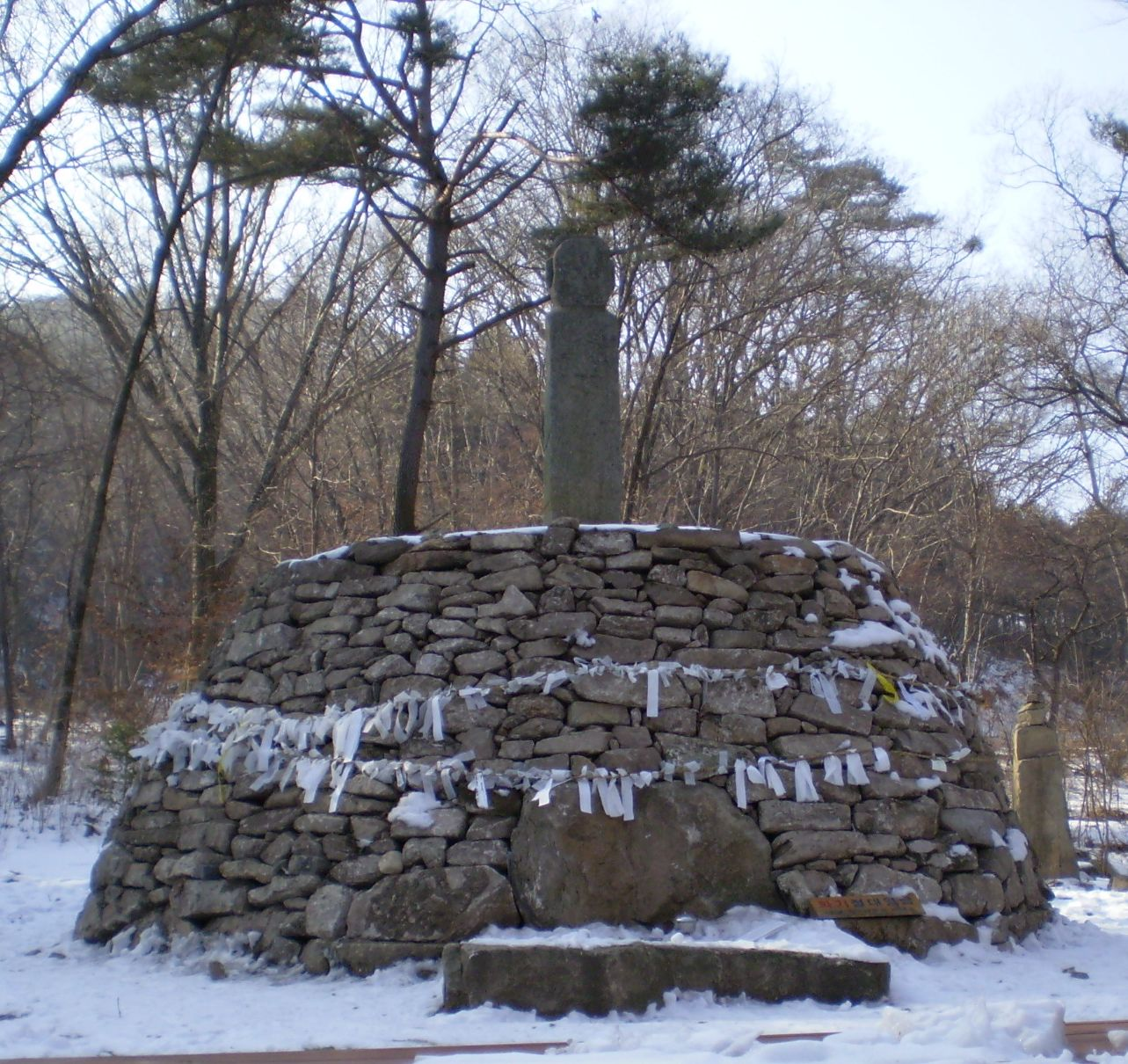
Chaekbawi shrine at Mungyeong Saejae.

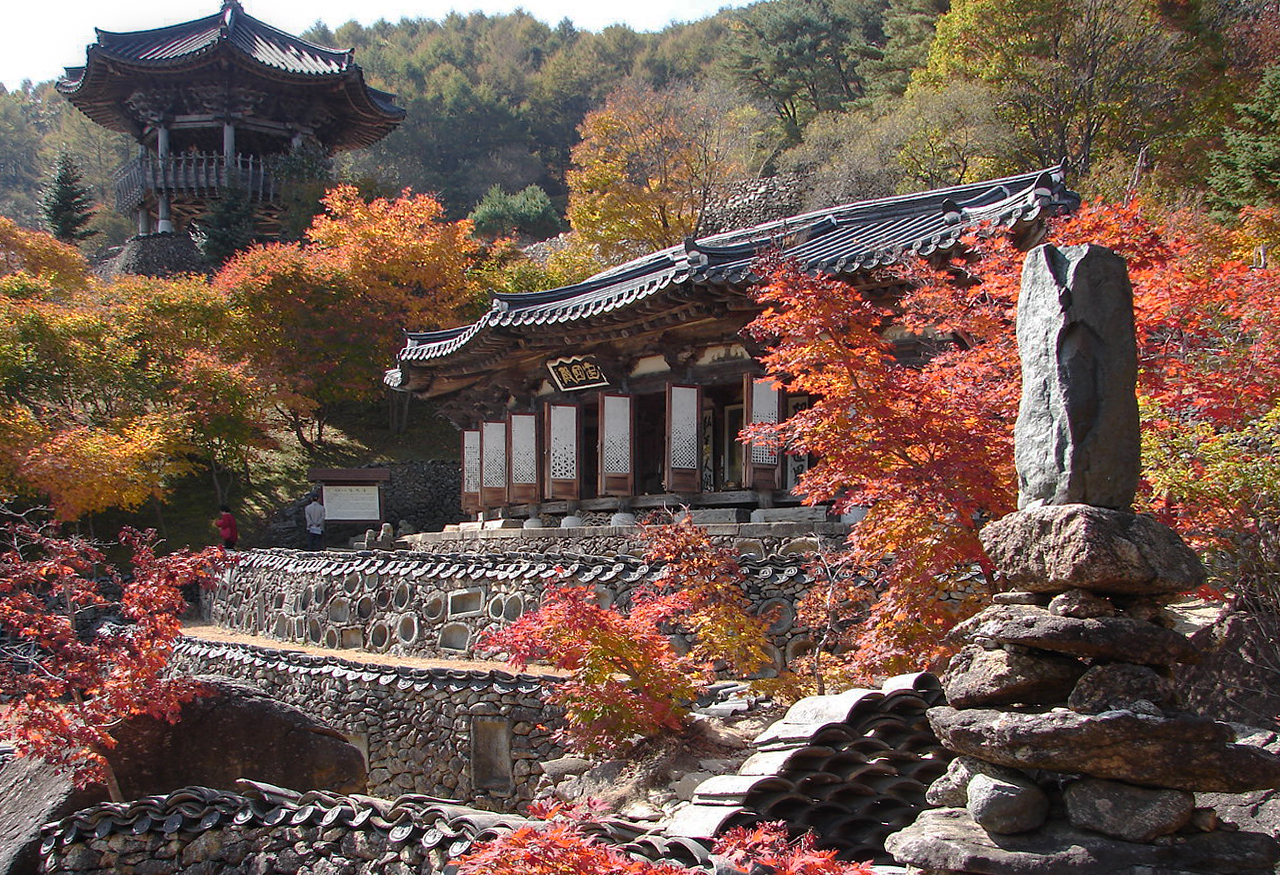
Pavilions of the Samseonggung, a shrine for the worship of Hwanin, Hwanung, and Dangun.

In contemporary Korean, the shaman-priest or mu (무; 巫) is called a mudang (무당; 巫堂) if female or a baksu if male, although other names and locutions are used. (Note: Another term is dangol (Korean: 당골). The word mudang is mostly associated, though not exclusively, to female shamans due to their prevalence in the Korean tradition in recent centuries. This has brought to the development of other locutions for male shamans, including sana mudang (literally "male mudang") in the Seoul area or baksu mudang ("healer mudang"), shortened to baksu, in the Pyongyang area. It is reasonable to believe that the word baksu is an ancient authentic designation for male shamans.) Mu is synonymous with Chinese wu, which denotes priests both male and female. The role of the mudang is to act as intermediary between the spirits or gods and the human plane, through gut (rituals), seeking to resolve problems in the patterns of development of human life.

Central is interaction with Haneullim or Hwanin, meaning "source of all being", and of all gods of nature, the utmost god or the supreme mind. The mu are mythically described as descendants of the "Heavenly King", son of the "Holy Mother [of the Heavenly King]", with investiture often passed down through female princely lineage. However, other myths link the heritage of the traditional faith to Dangun, male son of the Heavenly King and initiator of the Korean nation.

Besides Japanese Shinto, Korean shamanism has also similarities with Chinese shamanism, and is akin to the Siberian, Mongolian, and Manchurian religious traditions. Some studies trace the Korean ancestral god Dangun to the Ural-Altaic Tengri "Heaven", the shaman and the prince. In the dialects of some provinces of Korea the shaman is called dangul dangul-ari. The mudang is similar to the Japanese miko and the Ryukyuan yuta. Muism has exerted an influence on some Korean new religions, such as Cheondoism and Jeungsanism. According to various sociological studies, Korea's type of Christianity owes much of its success to native shamanism, which provided a congenial mindset and models for the religion to take root.

In the 1890s, the last decades of the Joseon kingdom, Protestant missionaries gained significant influence, and led a demonisation of native religion through the press, and even carried out campaigns of physical suppression of local cults. The Protestant discourse would have had an influence on all further attempts to uproot native religion. The "movement to destroy Korean shamanism" carried out in South Korea in the 1970s and 1980s, destroyed much of the physical heritage of Korean religion (temples and shrines), especially during the regime of President Park Chung Hee. There has been of a revival of shamanism in South Korea in most recent times.

=== Cheondoism ===
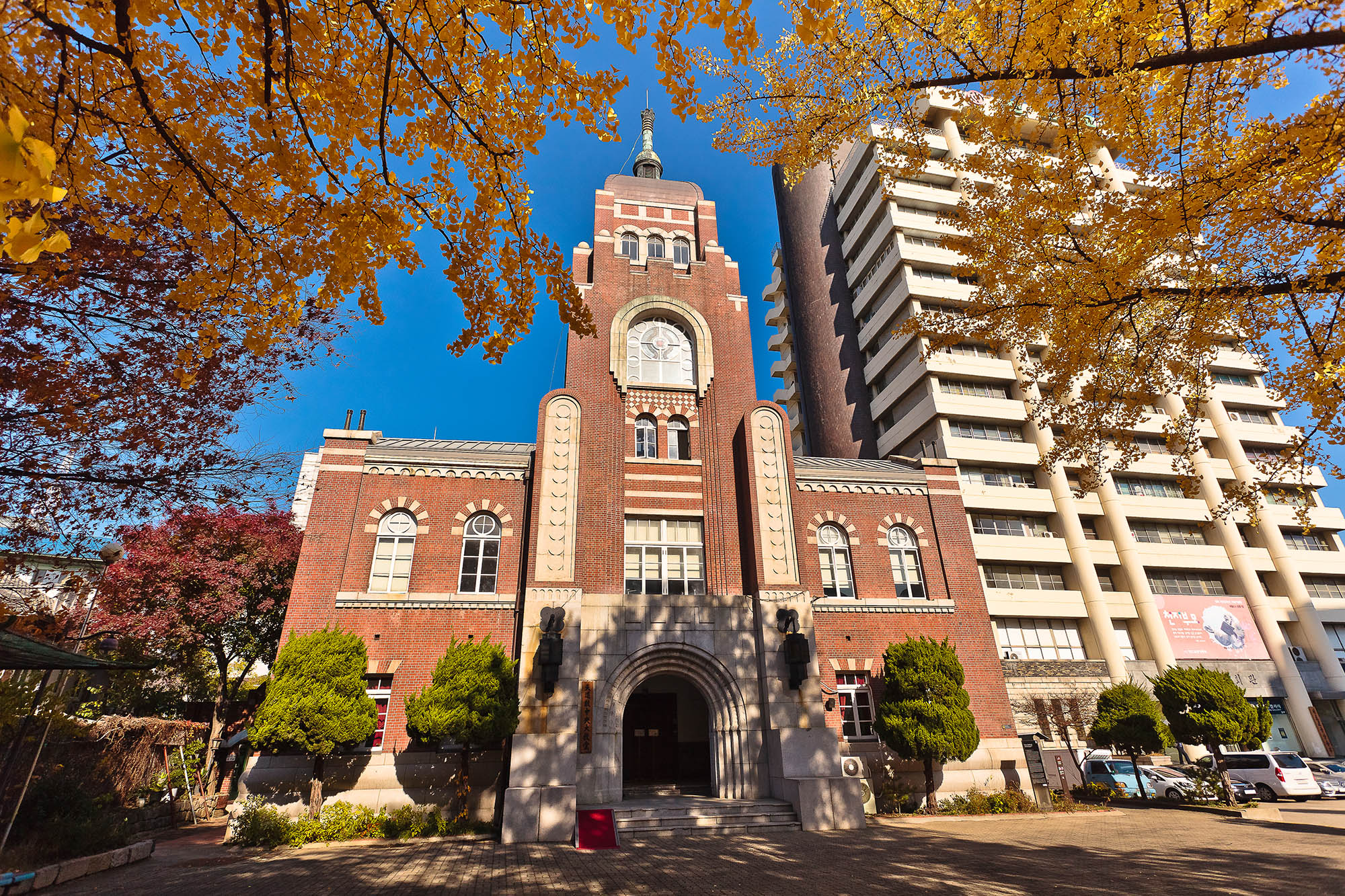
Headquarters of Cheondoism in Seoul.

Cheondoism is a fundamentally Confucian religious tradition derived from indigenous Sinism. It is the religious dimension of the Donghak ("Eastern Learning") movement that was founded by Choe Je-u (1824–1864), a member of an impoverished yangban (aristocratic) family, in 1860 as a counter-force to the rise of "foreign religions", which in his view included Buddhism and Christianity (part of Seohak, the wave of Western influence that penetrated Korean life at the end of the 19th century). Choe Je-u founded Cheondoism after having been allegedly healed from illness by an experience of Sangje or Haneullim, the god of the universal Heaven in traditional shamanism.

The Donghak movement became so influential among common people that in 1864 the Joseon government sentenced Choe Je-u to death. The movement grew and in 1894 the members gave rise to the Donghak Peasant Revolution against the royal government. With the division of Korea in 1945, most of the Cheondoist community remained in the north, where the majority of them dwelled. Only few thousands of them remain in South Korea today.

The social and historical significance of the Donghak movement and Cheondoism has been largely ignored in South Korea, contrarywise to North Korea where Cheondoism is viewed positively as a folk (minjung) movement.

=== Other sects ===
Apart from Cheondoism, other sects based on indigenous religion were founded between the end of the 19th century and the early decades of the 20th century. They include Daejongism, which has as its central creed the worship of Dangun, legendary founder of Gojoseon, thought of as the first proto-Korean kingdom; and a splinter sect of Cheondoism: Suwunism.

Jeungsanism defines a family of religions founded in the early 20th century that emphasise magical practices and millenarian teachings of Kang Jeungsan (Gang Il-sun). There are more than a hundred "Jeungsan religions," including the now defunct Bocheonism: the largest in Korea is currently Daesun Jinrihoe, an offshoot of the still existing Taegeukdo (태극도), while Jeungsando is the most active overseas.

There are also a number of small religious sects, which have sprung up around Gyeryongsan ("Rooster-Dragon Mountain", always one of Korea's most-sacred areas) in South Chungcheong Province, the supposed future site of the founding of a new dynasty originally prophesied in the 18th century (or before).

According to Andrew Eungi Kim, there was a rise of new religious movements in the late 1900s which account for about 10 percent of all churches in South Korea. According to Kim, this is the outcome of foreign invasions, as well as conflicting views regarding social and political issues. Many of the new religious movements are syncretic in character.

== Other religions ==
Seoul Central Mosque in Seoul.

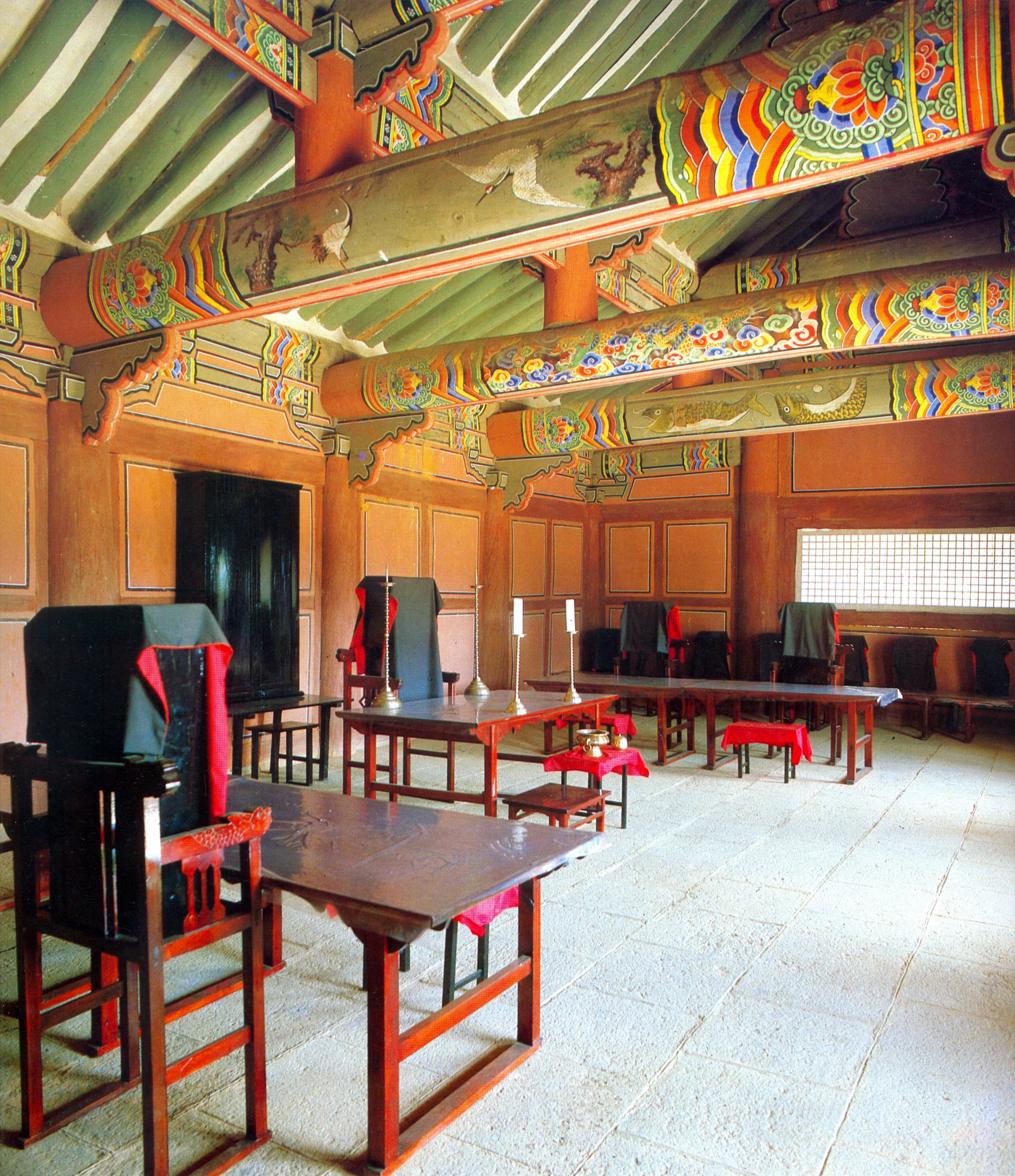
Shrine of a Confucian school in Gangneung.

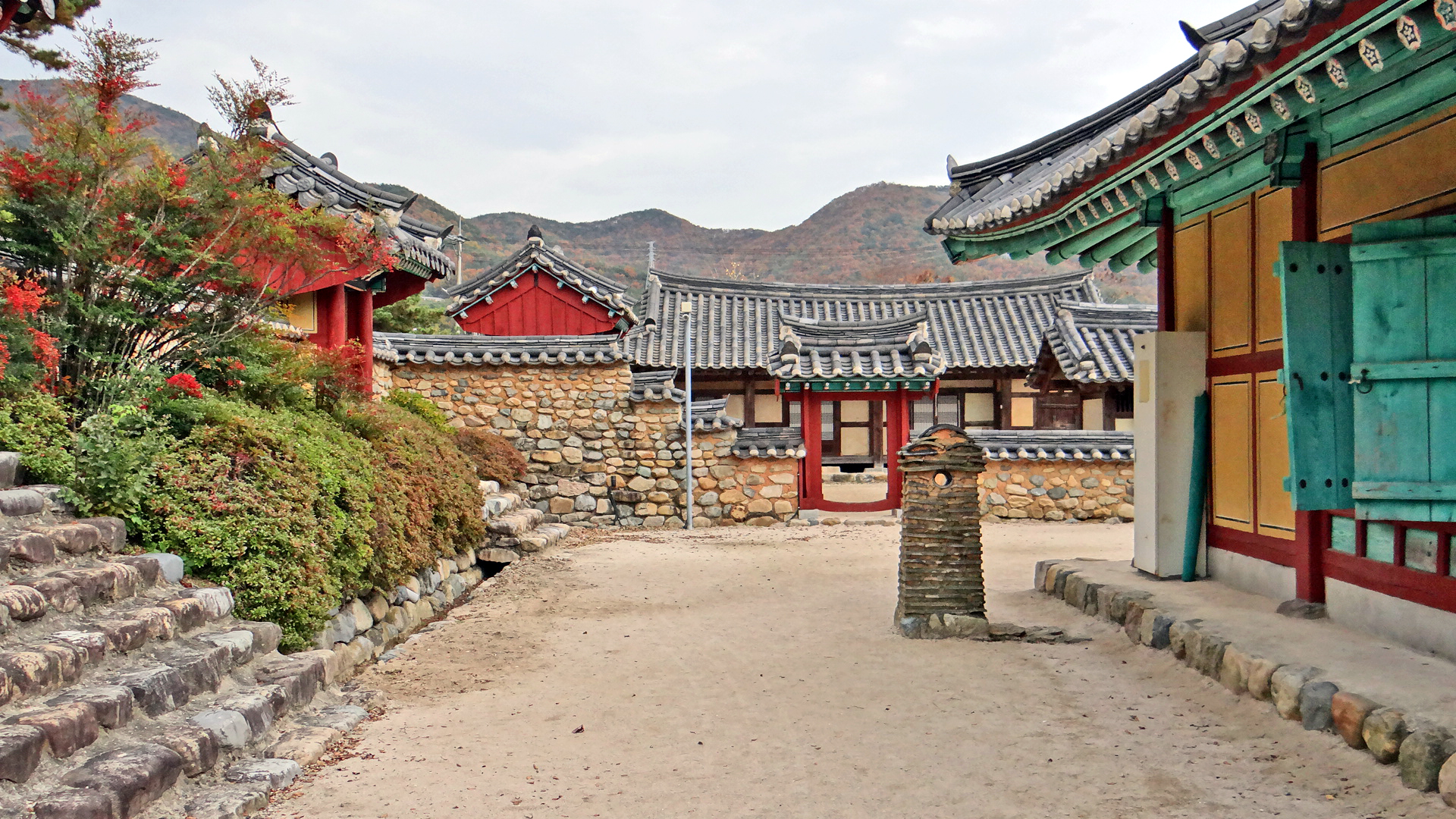
Chisan Seowon, a seowon (private Confucian school) of the Joseon era.

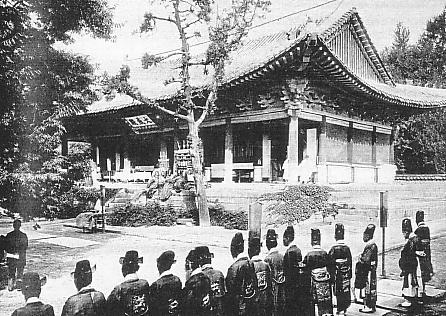
Ritual at a Confucian temple (before 1935).

=== Bahá'í Faith ===
Baháʼí Faith was first introduced to Korea by an American woman named Agnes Alexander.

=== Confucianism ===
Only few contemporary South Koreans identify as adherents of Confucianism. Korean intellectuals historically developed a distinct Korean Confucianism. However, with the end of the Joseon state and the wane of Chinese influence in the 19th and 20th century, Confucianism was abandoned. The influence of Confucian ethical thought remains strong in other religious practices, and in Korean culture in general. Confucian rituals are still practised at various times of the year. The most prominent of these are the annual rites held at the Shrine of Confucius in Seoul. Other rites, for instance those in honour of clan founders, are held at shrines found throughout the country.

=== Hinduism ===
Hinduism is practiced among South Korea's small Indian, Nepali and Balinese migrant community. However, Hindu traditions such as yoga and Vedanta have attracted interest among younger South Koreans. Hindu temples in the Korea include the Sri Radha Shyamasundar Mandir in central Seoul, Sri Lakshmi Narayanan Temple in metropolitan Seoul, Himalayan Meditation and Yoga Sadhana Mandir in Seocho in Seoul, and Sri Sri Radha Krishna temple in Uijeongbu 20 km away on outskirt of Seoul.

=== Islam ===
Islam in South Korea is very small minority only 0.3% in Korea. KMF estimates that 200,000 Muslims are living in South Korea, in which 45,000 are natives. 60% are foreigners in which 70% people are migrants left over her students.

=== Shinto ===
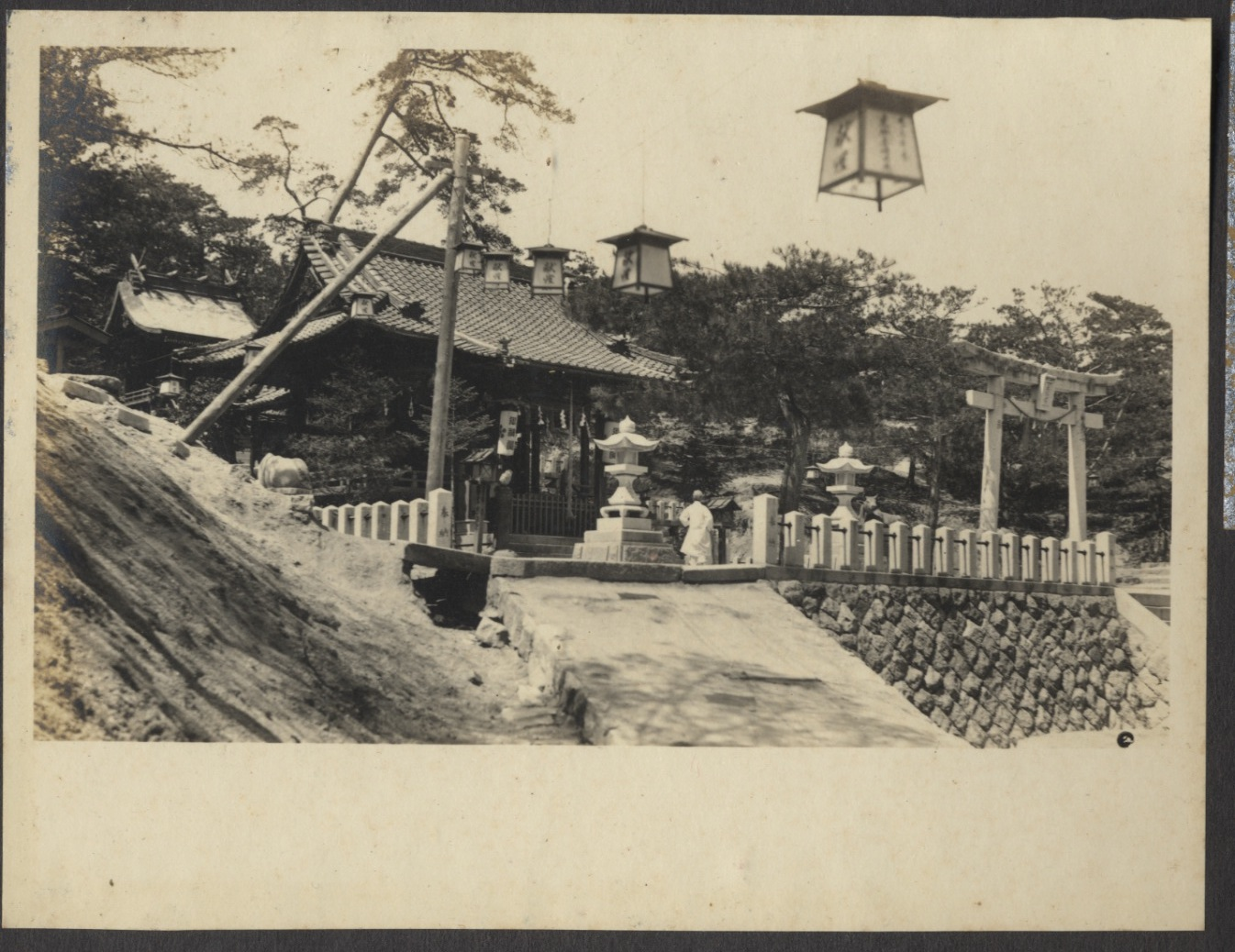
Keijyo Shinto Shrine, prior to 1935, Seoul

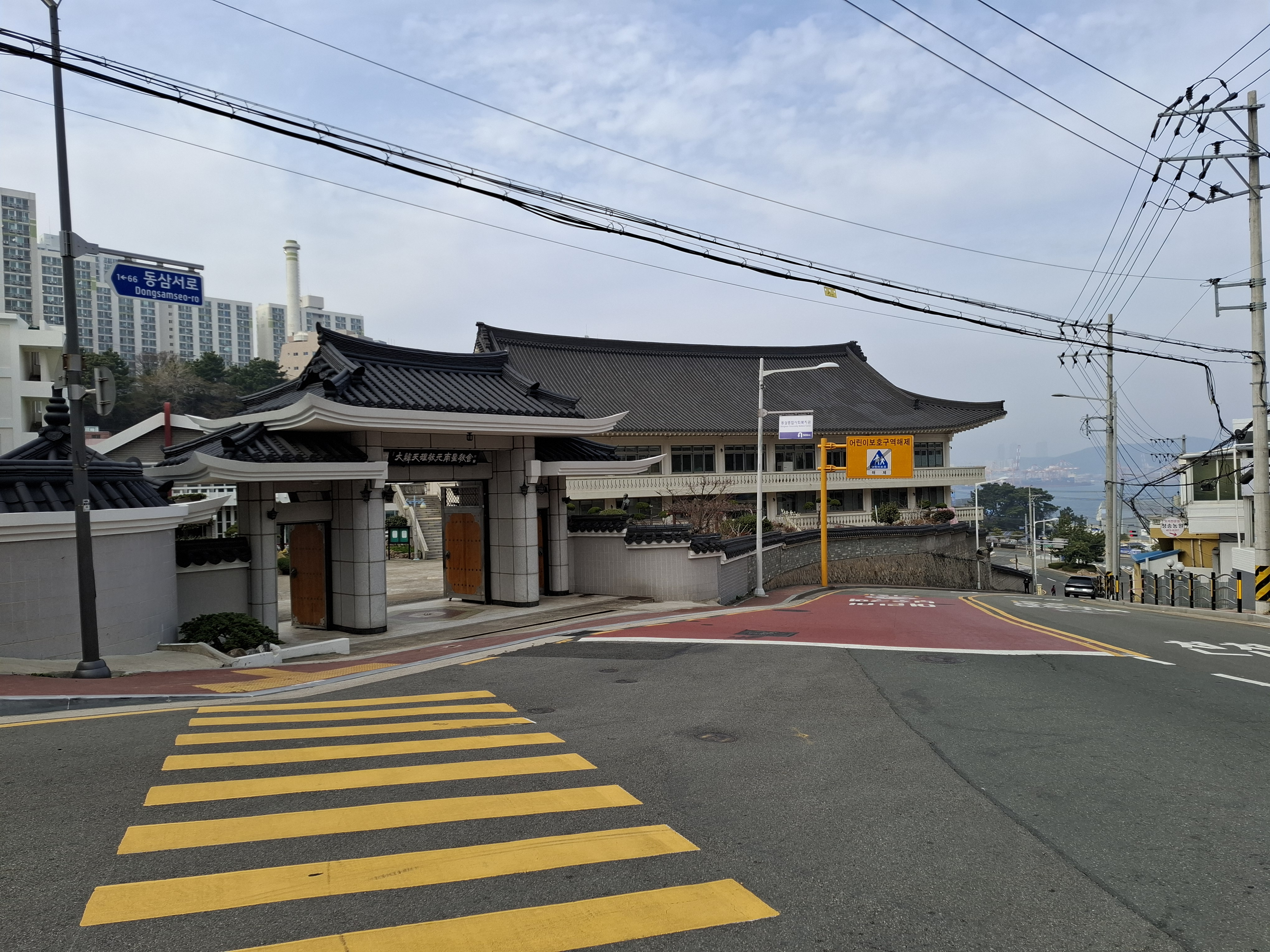
Church of Korean Tenrikyo (Daehan Cheolligyo) in Busan.

During Japan's colonisation of Korea (1910–1945), given the suggested common origins of the two peoples, Koreans were considered to be outright part of the Japanese population, to be wholly assimilated. The Japanese studied and coopted native Korean shamanism by overlapping it with their State Shinto (similar measures of assimilation were applied to Buddhism), which hinged upon the worship of Japanese high gods and the emperor's godhead. Hundreds of Japanese Shinto shrines were built throughout the peninsula. This policy led to massive conversion of Koreans to Christian churches, which were already well ingrained in the country, representing a concern for the Japanese program, and supported Koreans' independence. After the Allied forces defeated Japan in 1945, Korea was liberated from Japanese rule. As soon as the Shinto priests withdrew to Japan, all Shinto shrines in Korea were either destroyed or converted into another use.

There is a tiny presence of Sect Shinto groups, Zenrinkyo and Daehan Cheolligyo (Tenrikyo), in South Korea today. Tenrikyo claims to have thousands of South Korean members.

=== Sikhism ===
Sikhs have been in South Korea for about 50 years. The first South Korean gurdwara was established in 2001. There are about 550 Sikhs in South Korea, now recently the Sikhs in South were allowed to acquire South Korean citizenship.

== See also ==
- Freedom of religion in North Korea
- Freedom of religion in South Korea
- Irreligion in South Korea
- Religion in Korea
- Religion in North Korea
- Taoism in Korea

== Sources ==
- Daniel Tudor. Korea: The Impossible Country. Tuttle Publishing, 2012. ISBN 0804842523
- Donald L. Baker. Korean Spirituality. University of Hawaii Press, 2008. ISBN 0824832574
- Donald L. Baker. Modernization and Monotheism: How Urbanization and Westernization Have Transformed the Religious Landscape of Korea. University of British Columbia. Published in: Sang-Oak Lee, Gregory K. Iverson, Pathways into Korean Language and Culture: Essays in Honor of Young-key Kim-Renaud. Pajigong Press, Seoul, 2003. pp. 471–507
- James H. Grayson. Korea - A Religious History. Routledge, 2002. ISBN 070071605X
- Joon-sik Choi. Folk-Religion: The Customs in Korea. Ewha Womans University Press, 2006. ISBN 8973006282
- Jung Young Lee. Korean Shamanistic Rituals. Mouton De Gruyter, 1981. ISBN 9027933782
- Laurel Kendall. Shamans, Nostalgias, and the IMF: South Korean Popular Religion in Motion. University of Hawaii Press, 2010. ISBN 0824833988
- Lee Chi-ran. Chief Director, Haedong Younghan Academy. The Emergence of National Religions in Korea.
- Pyong Gap Min, Development of Protestantism in South Korea: Positive and Negative Elements. On: Asian American Theological Forum (AATF) 2014, VOL. 1 NO. 3, ISSN 2374-8133
- Robert E. Buswell, Timothy S. Lee. Christianity in Korea. University of Hawaii Press, 2007. ISBN 082483206X
- Sang Taek Lee. Religion and Social Formation in Korea: Minjung and Millenarianism. Walter de Gruyter & Co, 1996. ISBN 3110147971
- Sorensen, Clark W. University of Washington. The Political Message of Folklore in South Korea's Student Demonstrations of the Eighties: An Approach to the Analysis of Political Theater. Paper presented at the conference "Fifty Years of Korean Independence", sponsored by the Korean Political Science Association, Seoul, Korea, July 1995.
