= Ko P'an-rye =

Korean religious leader (1880–1935)

- Born: April 22, 1880; Sinsong Village, Deokcheon Township, Jeongeup, South Jeolla Province, Joseon
- Died: June 24, 1909; Seongdo-ri, Mujeong-myeon, Damyang County, North Jeolla Province, Korean Empire
- Other names: Ko Puin (高夫人), Go Subu (高首婦)
- Known for: Founder of a religious movement that is at the origin of around one hundred different Korean new religions
- Spouse: Gang Il-sun (1871–1909)

Ko P'an-rye (Korean: 고판례; Hanja: 高判禮; April 22, 1880 – June 24, 1909), also known as Ko Puin or Ko Subu, was the founder of Seondogyo (선도교; 仙道敎), the first sect of Jeungsanism during the Japanese colonial period in Korea. Her contributions to the religion and her spiritual activities marked significant growth and development within the movement.

== Early life ==
Ko P'an-rye was born in 1880 in Mu-myeon, Damyang County, South Jeolla Province, Joseon to father Go Deok-sam and a mother with the surname Park. She was an early believer in the native Korean religion Donghak. She moved to Daehung-ri, Ipam-myeon, Jeongeup County, where she married into the Shin family. She became a widow at the age of 29.

== Religious activities ==
In 1907, Kang Jeungsan visited the home of Cha Gyeong-seok in Daehung-ri, where Ko P'an-rye served as the head lady (subu) and subsequently married Jeungsan. Jeungsan prophesied a great destiny for her, stating, "I have spent 15 years looking for you; now I will reveal the great task of heaven and earth to you." After Jeungsan's death in 1909, which she learned about through a vision, Ko P'an-rye began experiencing spiritual phenomena. During a memorial service in 1911, she collapsed and upon regaining consciousness, it was believed that Jeungsan's spirit had entered her. Her behavior and speech reportedly mirrored Jeungsan's, attracting many followers and leading to the formation of Sundo-gyo or Taeul-gyo.

== Leadership and challenges ==
With the support of her cousin Cha Gyeong-seok, the sect expanded rapidly. However, from around 1914, Cha Gyeong-seok seized control and hindered her interactions with the followers. Consequently, in 1918, she relocated to Jojonggol, Baeksan-myeon, Gimje County. There, she gained a reputation for healing and miraculous acts, treating ailments from headaches to infertility and even taking on others' illnesses herself. Despite her own doctrinal beliefs aligning closely with Jeungsan's teachings, her influence was significant.

== Later life and legacy ==
In 1931, Ko P'an-rye merged her group with Lee Sang-ho's Donghwa-gyo to form a unified religious body. By 1933, she built a retreat in Osungsan, Seongsan-myeon, Okgu County, where she lived in seclusion until her death in 1935.

== See also ==
- Gang Il-sun
- Daesun Jinrihoe
- Jeung San Do
- Bocheonism

== Sources ==
- Hong, Beom-Cho (1988). 범증산교사 (History of Global Jeungsanism). Seoul: Institute of Global Jeungsanism. ISBN 978-8989752011.
