= Cosmic year =

Cosmic year may refer to:

- Galactic year, the estimated time it takes the Sun to orbit around the Milky Way
- Cosmic Calendar, a theorized scale of the life of the universe
- Cosmic year (Chinese astrology), the cosmic cycle of yin and yang
