= Daejin University =

Private university in Pocheon, South Korea

Coordinates: 37°52′18″N 127°9′22″E

- 대진대학교
- Type: Private
- Established: November 15, 1991
- Location: Pocheon, South Korea
- Website: daejin.ac.kr

- Daejin University
- Hangul: 대진대학교
- Hanja: 大眞大學校
- RR: Daejin daehakgyo
- MR: Taejin taehakkyo

Daejin University (Korean: 대진대학교) is a private university located in Pocheon, Gyeonggi Province, South Korea. It was founded by Daesun Jinrihoe in November 1991 and opened in March 1992.

The university operates Daejin University China Campus, a study abroad program based at the campuses of two universities in China: Soochow University and Harbin Normal University.

== Academics ==
Undergraduate courses of study are divided among six colleges: Culture, Humanities, Social Sciences, Natural Sciences, Sciences and Engineering, and Arts. Training is also provided at the graduate level, through specialized graduate schools of Education, Industry, Business Administration and Legal Affairs.

== History ==
The university was established in 1991 by the Daesun Jinrihoe, a Korean religious group. The location was chosen due to its position near the midpoint of the line connecting Halla-san with Baekdu-san, and thus at the symbolic heart of the Korean peninsula.

== Notable alumni ==
- Bae Soo-bin
- Choi Jin-hyuk
- Go Soo-hee
- Haha (RGP)
- Hong In-young
- Jeong Jin-woon (2AM)
- Ki Tae-young
- Kim Si-hoo
- Kim Sung-kyu
- Lim Ju-hwan
- Lim Seul-ong (2AM)
- Park Ki-woong
- Taeyang (Big Bang)

== See also ==
- List of colleges and universities in South Korea
- Education in South Korea
