= Gang Il-sun =

Korean religious leader (1871–1909)

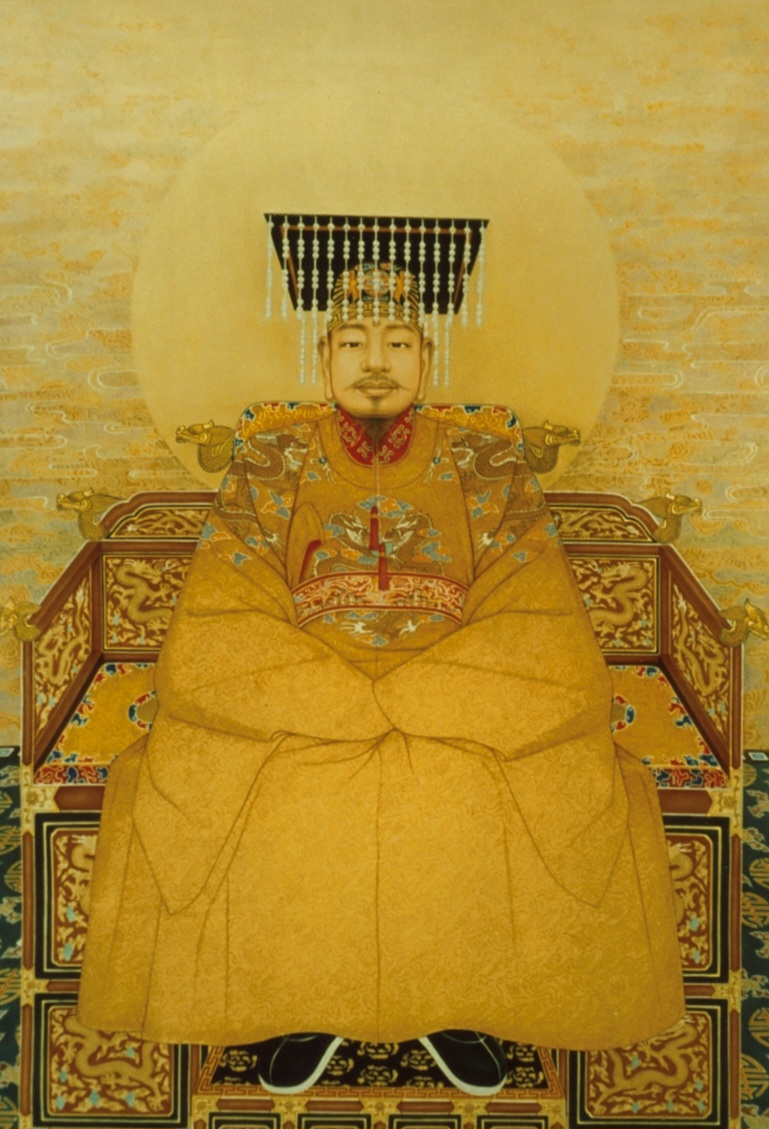
- Born: November 1, 1871; Sinsong Village, Deokcheon Township of Jeongeup City, North Jeolla Province, Joseon
- Died: June 24, 1909; Cheungdo Village, Geumsan Township of Gimje City, North Jeolla Province, Korean Empire
- Known for: Founder of a religious movement that is at the origin of around one hundred different Korean new religions
- Spouse: Jeong Chi-Sun (1874–1928)
- Children: Yi-Sun (Sun-Im) (daughter, 1904–1959)

Gang Il-sun (Korean: 강일순; Hanja: 姜一淳; November 1, 1871 – June 24, 1909), also known as Kang Il-sun and known to his followers as Kang Jeungsan (Korean: 강증산; Hanja: 姜甑山), is the founder of Jeungsanism, a Korean religious movement that generated after his death around one hundred different new religions, including Daesoon Jinrihoe and Jeung San Do. Jeungsanism, as his movement was called, and various Korean new religions (sinheung jonggyo, literally, "newly emerged religions") derived from it, have been seen by scholars as a syncretism of Buddhism (Bul-gyo), Confucianism (Yu-gyo), Taoism (Do-gyo) with unique religious insights of Kang and certain elements borrowed from Christianity (Gidok-gyo), as well as an underlying Korean shamanism (Musok-Sinang).

== Early life ==
Gang Il-sun was born in Gobu County, Jeolla Province (present-day Deokcheon Township of Jeongeup, North Jeolla Province, Korea) on September 19, 1871, according to the Lunar calendar mostly used by his followers, or November 1, 1871, of the Gregorian calendar. There is a hagiographic literature written by his followers, which describes miraculous phenomena surrounding his early years. For instance, hagiographical accounts record that "at the time of his birth (...) two female fairies (仙女) descended from heaven into the delivery room," filling it with a "sweet-smelling aroma." Later, it is claimed that he "learned Chinese classics at a Seodang and mastered them to the point of memorizing and reciting all of them by heart," through a complete understanding of their meaning.

In 1891, Gang married Jeong Chi-sun (鄭治順; 1874–1928), a lady from Gimje County. In 1894, he opened a Seodang in the home of his brother-in-law Jeong Nam-Gi (鄭南基). He acquired a reputation for his knowledge of Buddhism, Confucianism, Taoism, and Korean folk religions, and gathered a few disciples. Reputedly, he also visited Kim Il Bu (金一夫; 1826–1898), the well known scholar who introduced the Jeong-yeok (正易), i.e. a new interpretation of the Chinese I Ching (Book of Changes). Kim is said to have offered a new arrangement of the I Ching Chinese trigrams, together with other diagrams and an explanatory text, including insights he had received in a mysterious vision. His re-balancing of the trigrams had a profound influence on many Korean new religions, including those derived from Gang.

== Donghak ==
In 1860 Choe Je-u, concerned about the growing influence of the West, the increasing Japanese presence in Joseon Korea, widespread corruption in government and established religion, and abuse of power by the yangban (aristocratic social class), alleged he had a revelation from the Supreme God Sangje (Shang-ti in Chinese) and attained enlightenment. Choe Je-u became the founder of the Donghak (Eastern Learning) movement, the prototype of many subsequent Korean syncretistic new religions. Donghak culminated in the unsuccessful Donghak Rebellion of 1894, which was fueled by a combination of religious fervor centering on the millennial visions of a coming messiah and anger regarding Seoul's high taxes. Central to Choe Je-u's teachings was a belief in Hu-Cheon Gaebyeok (後天開闢), the Great Opening (Gaebyeok) of the Later World (Hu-Cheon), the new age paradise of Donghak, which also later characterized Gang Il-sun's millenarian vision. Gang Il-sun, in fact, insisted that he was Sangje himself who, prior to incarnating on earth, had bestowed that revelation upon Choe Je-u. Gang "had considerable connections with the Donghak movement, not only ideologically but also geographically," as the village where Gang lived was only four kilometers away from the location where the first uprising of the Donghak revolution began. Later, Gang gathered a number of followers in the North Jeolla province, where he lived, and among them where some members of Donghak. Although he was interested in the religious ideas of Donghak, Gang Il-sun predicted, quite correctly, the defeat of Donghak's peasant militia, and advised his followers not to join it. He believed that the problems of Korea, and human society in general, would be solved through spiritual awakening rather than armed rebellion.

== Messianic claims ==
After the bloody defeat of Donghak, Gang Il-sun wandered around Korea for three years, surveying public sentiment. In 1900, he returned home and, starting in the years that followed, gathered a sizable number of followers. According to these followers, during the Summer of 1901 he achieved enlightenment on the Moaksan mountain, after forty-nine days of ascetic practices and fasting. In fact, the followers claimed for their spiritual leader much more than enlightenment, as they accepted his claim that he was Sangje, the Supreme Lord, who had bestowed a revelation upon Choe Je-u and had than incarnated in this world to initiate a New Age. According to Daesoon Jinrihoe, the largest movement recognizing Gang as Sangje, his ascetic practices in the Moaksan mountain were performed to open the Great Dao of Heaven and Earth and to exercise judgement on the divine beings and were, thus, more than ascetic practices. The followers also claimed that he judged all deities in charge of the Former World, opened the way to the Later World and, through the rituals he performed between 1901 and 1909, achieved a complete "Reordering of the Universe" (Cheonji Gongsa, 天地公事). Daesun Jinrihoe believes that there was a residual work of reordering, to be completed by his successors in the religious orthodoxy, Jo Jeongsan (趙鼎山; 1895–1958) and Park Wudang (朴牛堂; 1918–1996). Another branch of Jeungsanism, Jeung San Do, believes that, as Gang was God the Father, his female disciple Goh Pan-Lye (高判禮; 1880–1935), revered by Jeung San Do with the title of Tae-mo-nim, was God the Mother and between 1926 and 1935 performed her own reordering of the universe.

== Relations with the Japanese ==
After the Donghak rebellion, Japan had a growing presence in Korea, and this culminated in the Japan-Korea Treaty of 1910 and the formal annexation of Korea by Japan. Gang Il-sun maintained an attitude similar to the one he had exhibited when confronted with the Donghak movement. Although critical of those Koreans who sided unconditionally with the Japanese, Gang Il-sun again advised against "any form of violence" and "stressed reconciliation and peace," insisting also that this period of Japanese rule in Korea would bring resolution to the grievances that Japan had in history. His peaceful attitude, however, did not protect him from the suspicions of the Japanese authorities. On December 25, 1907, he and a number of his followers were arrested, based on the suspect that they intended to raise an army against the Japanese. Reportedly, "even in prison, he made peaceful gestures" and "did not protest against the authorities in any way." He was finally released on February 4, 1908, continued his rituals and preaching, and died on June 24, 1909, at the Donggok Clinic he had established in 1908.

== Legacy ==
Gang Il-sun chose Goh Pan-Lye as his successor, and after his passing his movement split into many different factions. In 1911, Goh Pan-Lye (Subu, literally "Head Lady," although there were two "Subus" in Gang's circle), a female disciple, emerged as the leader of one of the largest factions, which eventually came under the control of Goh's male cousin, Cha Gyeong-Seok (1880–1936). Cha's branch, known as Bocheonism (Bocheob-gyo), according to some scholars "had more followers during the Japanese colonial period than any other religion, more than an estimated 6 million adherents." However, it declined quite rapidly. Goh had separated from Cha in 1919 and established her own organization, which in turn divided into several rival factions after her death. Kim Hyeong-Ryeol (1862–1932), another leading disciple of Gang Il-sun, originally supported Cha but left him in 1914 and established yet another branch with the help of Gang Il-sun's widow, Jeong. Again, this branch split into several independent groups. Ultimately, around one hundred different groups claiming the legacy of Gang Il-sun came into existence, although few of them survive to this day.

The largest one is Daesun Jinrihoe, which originates from Jo Jeongsan (1895–1958), who was not a direct disciple of Gang Il-sun but claimed to have received a revelation from him in 1917, eight years after Gang Il-sun's death. Jo Jeongsan's followers claim, however, that in 1909 Gang Il-sun saw a train passing, which had Jo Jeongsan, then a teenager, aboard with his family, heading to Bongcheon, Manchuria, to live in exile there, and stated: "A man can do anything at the age of 15 if he is able to take his identification tag (hopae) with him." Jo Jeongsan's disciples later claimed that these words amounted to an endorsement by Gang Il-sun of Jo Jeongsan as his successor. Gang's only daughter, Sun-Im (1904–1959), originally accepted Jo but later established her own branch, known as Jeung San Beob Jong Gyo, which is headquartered in Korea's North Jeolla province, and after protracted litigation with other branches obtained the mortal remains of Kang, which are currently at its headquarters.

Be it as it may be, and although statistics are in turn a matter of contention, there is little doubt that a large number of Koreans, perhaps as much as several millions, are today connected with one or another branch of the religious movement started by Gang Il-sun and recognize him as a divine incarnation, the majority of them belonging to Daesun Jinrihoe. Both Daesun Jinrihoe and Jeung San Do have also started a missionary activity abroad, particularly in the United States. Certainly, Gang Il-Sun did not believe that his message of salvation was restricted to Korea and indeed he explicitly taught that it was intended for the whole world.

== See also ==
- Daesun Jinrihoe
- Jeung San Do
- Bocheonism
