= Daesun Jinrihoe =

Korean new religious movement

Founder
- Park Wudang

Regions with significant populations
- Korea

Languages
- Korean (main religious language but also a recognized language and official populated also)

- Daesun Jinrihoe
- Hangul: 대순진리회
- Hanja: 大巡眞理會
- Revised Romanization: Daesun Jillihoe
- McCune–Reischauer: Taesun Chillihoe

Daesun Jinrihoe (or Jillihoe) (Korean: 대순진리회)—which in its English-language publications has recently used the transliteration Daesoonjinrihoe and, from 2017, Daesoon Jinrihoe—is a Korean new religious movement, founded in April 1969 by Park Han-gyeong, known to his followers as Park Wudang (박한경; 1917–96, or 1917-95 according to the lunar calendar used by the movement). Daesoon thought is said to be a comprehensive system of truth representing the Great Dao of "resolution of grievances and reciprocation of gratitude into mutual beneficence".

== History ==
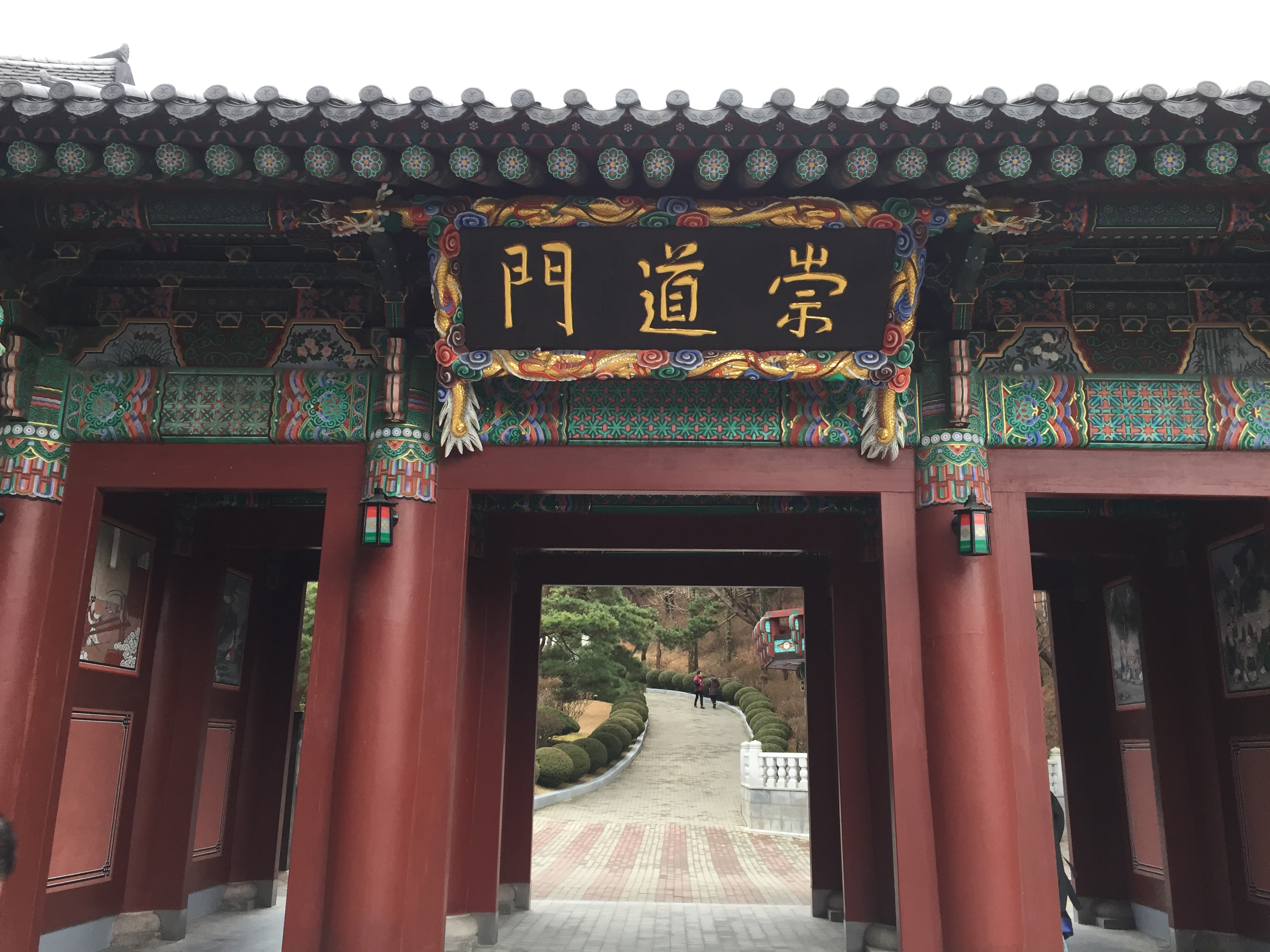
Sungdo Gate of the Yeoju Temple Headquarters.

Daesoon Jinrihoe is the largest among more than one hundred different Korean religious movements constituting the group of new religions known as Jeungsanism and originating from the activities of Kang Jeungsan (Gang Il-Sun, 1871–1909), believed by his followers to be the incarnated Supreme God. After Kang’s death in 1909, each of his main disciples, and some of his relatives, went on to establish different new religions, which in turn splintered and fragmented into rival groups, of which today the most active outside Korea is Jeung San Do, which was founded in 1974. The rival group Jeung San Do is better known internationally, but less widely followed within Korea, while Daesoon Jinrihoe has concentrated its activities in Korea.

The largest branch did not originate from a direct disciple of Kang. Jo Cheol-Je, known to his disciples as Jo Jeongsan (1895–1958), never personally met Kang, but claimed to have received a revelation from him in 1917. He was recognized as the successor Kang had announced in his prophecies by Kang’s sister (Seondol, ca. 1881–1942), mother (Kwon, 1850–1926) and daughter (Sun-Im, 1904–1959), although the daughter eventually founded her own separate branch. Jo Jeongsan's followers claim that, in 1909, Kang saw a train passing, which had the young Jo Jeongsan aboard, and stated: "A man can do anything at the age of 15 if he is able to take his identification tag with him". Jo Jeongsan's disciples later claimed that these words amounted to an endorsement by Kang of Jo Jeongsan as his successor.

Jo gathered a sizable number of followers and established land-reclaiming projects in the Anmyeondo and Wonsando Islands, aimed at improving the situation of his disciples. In 1925, he legally incorporated his religious order, Mugeukdo, in Jeongeup. Korea, however, was under Japanese occupation and, due to Japan’s hostility to new religions, Jo decided to disband Mugeukdo in 1941. After World War II, the Japanese left Korea, and in 1948 Jo was able to reconstitute the order, changing its name into Taegeukdo in 1950. New headquarters were established in Busan, initially in the center of the city. Later, due to the new zoning regulations introduced in Busan, the headquarters were relocated to the suburb that came to be called Taegeukdo Village, also known as Gamcheon Culture Village.

Jo died on 6 March 1958. Initially, most of his followers accepted that he had designated as his successor Park Han-Gyeong, later known as Park Wudang (1917–1996, or 1917-95 according to the lunar calendar used by the movement), a schoolteacher who had joined the movement after World War II, after having been forced to join the Japanese army—and Taegeukdo continued as a united movement under Park for ten years, between 1958 and 1968. In 1968, a movement criticizing Park was led by one of Jo Jeongsan’s sons, Jo Yongnae (1934–2004). Eventually, the two factions parted company. Jo Yongnae’s followers kept the name Taegeukdo and the headquarters at the Taegeukdo Village, while Park incorporated in 1969 a new religious order under the name Daesoon Jinrihoe, with headquarters at the Junggok Temple in Junggok-dong in Seoul. Besides the faction of Taegeukdo led by Jo Yongnae and the followers of Park, who eventually became part of Daesoon Jinrihoe, a third group should be mentioned. It included those members of Taegeukdo who tried to promote a reconciliation between the two factions and called for a return of Park to Taegeukdo Village. Those in this third group formed in August 1969 an association called "Taegeukdo-jeongsin-hoe" (Taegeukdo Spirit Association), which changed its name into "Taegeuk Jinrihoe" in March 1971. In (or around) 1972, Taegeuk Jinrihoe was dissolved by its members, who decided to join Daesoon Jinrihoe.

Under Park’s guidance, Daesoon Jinrihoe became a successful movement. According to some accounts, it became the largest new religion in Korea. In 1986, a large new temple was inaugurated in Yeoju, followed in 1991 by Daejin University and later by other temples. In 1993, the movement’s headquarters were moved to the Yeoju Temple.

== Schisms ==
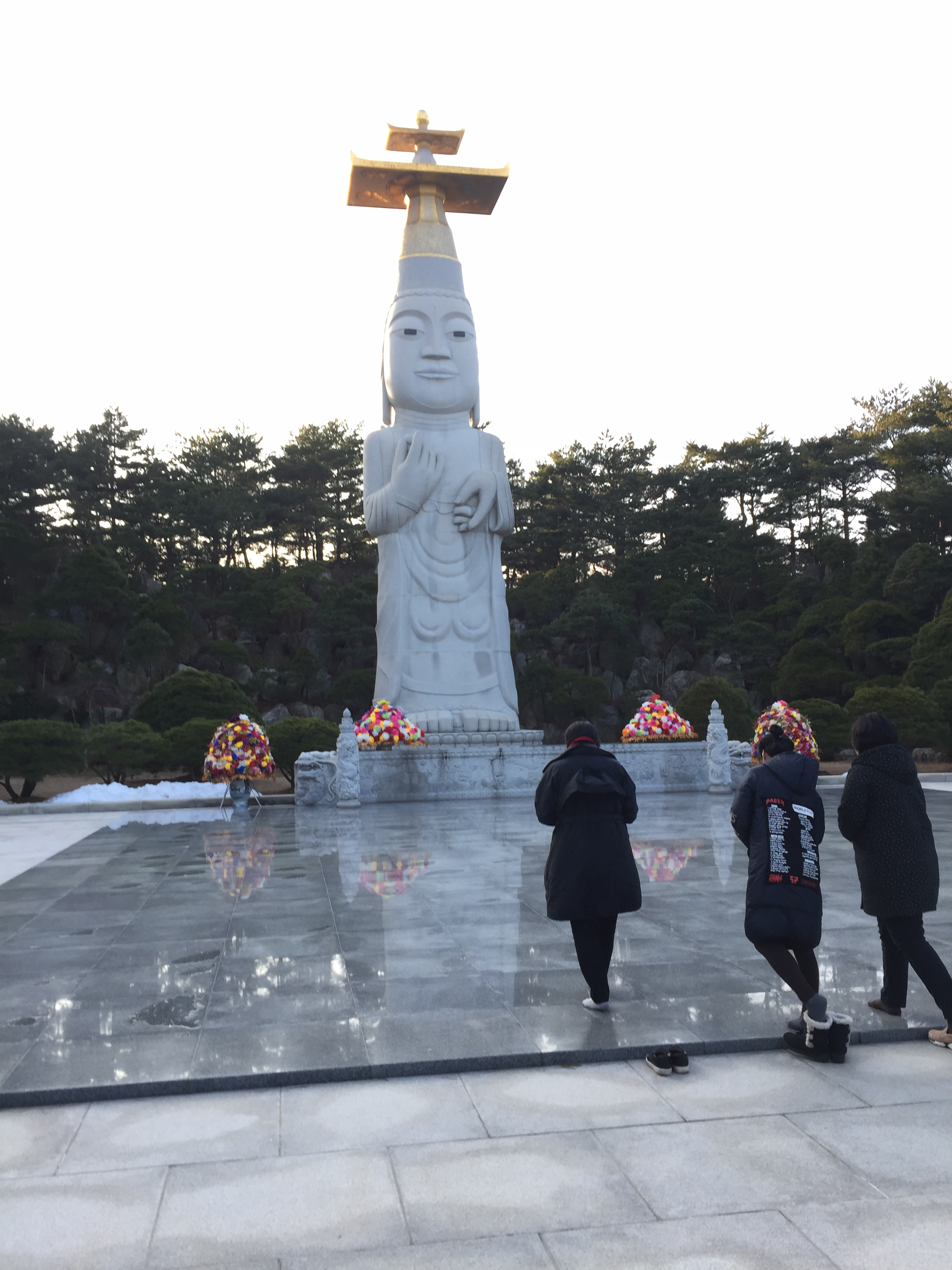
Statue of Buddha Maitreya, Geumgangsan Temple.

Park had not named a successor and died in 1996 (1995 according to the lunar calendar). Many of his followers had believed that they would achieve the state of dotong, or perfect unification with the Tao, during Park's lifetime. They strongly opposed the idea of appointing a successor of Park, and controversies followed. However, the main reason for the disputes, which had also motivations preceding Park Wudang’s death, so that some divisions had already manifested during his last years, was a controversy about the divinization of Park Wudang (i.e. whether he should now be worshipped as a god or identified with Buddha Maitreya), together with Kang Jeungsan and Jo Jeongsan, who had been in turn divinized. Those favorable to the divinization were led by Yi Yu-jong (1936–2010), the chairperson of the Yeoju Headquarters Temple Complex, who was also accused of administrative wrongdoings by his opponents. On 16 July 1999, a number of leaders of the faction opposed to Yi (estimates vary from 150 to 1,500 or 2,000) gathered at the headquarters in Yeoju and asked Yi to resign. A face-off erupted and the police was called, which finally escorted Yi out of the temple. The police had to intervene again in January 2000, when Yi's faction unsuccessfully tried to retake the Yeoju Headquarters. Yi's followers managed however to take control of Daesoon Jinrihoe's Junggok Temple in Seoul, where Yi proclaimed himself the successor of Park, while the majority group insisted that Park had appointed no successor and organized a collegial direction of the movement.

Eventually, Yi's group experienced in turn further schisms, and Daesoon Jinrihoe split into at least five factions: one, including a large majority of Park’s followers, was opposed to his deification and remained headquartered in Yeoju, while the four main groups that were in favor of considering Park either a god or the Buddha Maitreya were headquartered respectively at the Junggok Temple in Seoul, in Pocheon, Pohang, and Goesan. The latter branch is now known as Daejin Sungjuhoe. In 2013, a council was held in Yeoju to "normalize" the management of the order, attended by the Yeoju Headquarters, Seoul's Junggok Temple, and Pocheon branches. They did not come to an agreement about their doctrinal problems, but agreed to a joint management of Daejin University and of Jesaeng Hospital, one of the main components of Daesoon Jinrihoe’s health system.

These internal problems did not seem to stop the expansion of the movement. In 1997, a giant Maitreya Buddha statue was enshrined in the Geumgangsan Toseong Training Temple, which had been completed in 1996 in the Geumgang Mountain area, where Park Wudang was also buried. The educational and health systems also expanded.

== Beliefs ==
The doctrine of Daesoon Jinrihoe is based on a sacred history. While the world was in a miserable situation, the Catholic missionary priest Matteo Ricci attempted the solution of the problems through the spreading of Christianity and the construction of an earthly paradise in China. Because of the corrupted situation of Confucianism, Ricci failed, but his mission opened a door through which the Divine Spirits of the East could travel to the West. This was largely responsible for the scientific and cultural progress of the West. Eventually, however, both East and West succumbed to materialism, greed, and wars.

As a consequence, all divine spirits petitioned Sangje, the Supreme God, to intervene directly. Sangje undertook a "Great Itineration", where he reordered the three kingdoms of Heaven, Earth, and Human Beings. He descended to the West, from where he moved East and came to Korea, where he stayed for thirty years in the giant Buddha Maitreya statue in the Maitreya Hall of the Geumsansa Temple. During this time, he revealed his divine teachings and plans for a heavenly order to Choe Je-u, the founder of Donghak. Choe’s mission, just as Ricci’s centuries before, failed because of the resistance of the Confucian system. Sangje then withdrew his heavenly mandate from Choe (who was executed in 1864) and, in 1871, incarnated as Kang Jeungsan.

Daesoon Jinrihoe followers thus believe that Kang Jeungsan (Gang Il-Sun) was Sangje, or the Supreme God, in human form. Sangje descended to earth and assumed human form at the end of 19th century in order to renew human beings and build an Earthly Paradise through his Chenji-gongsa (Reordering Works of the Universe). To achieve this aim, a religious organization was also needed, and Daesoon Jinrihoe believes it was created through the succession in the religious orthodoxy first by Jo Jeongsan and then by Park Wudang.

Daesoon Jinrihoe articulates its doctrine in four tenets: "virtuous concordance of yin and yang", "harmonious union between divine beings and human beings", "resolution of grievances for mutual beneficence", and "perfected Unification with Dao". These four tenets are believed to contain within themselves all the teachings of Sangje. Some scholars believe that the third tenet, "resolution of grievances for mutual beneficence" (Haewon sangsaeng, 解冤相生), is the most distinctive teaching of Daesoon Jinrihoe. It teaches that, while Kang Jeungsan opened the road to solving the problem of grievances, humans should do their part by "cultivating" themselves, propagating the truth, and avoiding the creation of new grievances. The itinerary of "cultivation" is depicted in Daesoon Jinrihoe’s temples through the Simudo, i.e. "ox-seeking" paintings, where the spiritual journey is described through the metaphor of seeking a white ox.

Daesoon Jinrihoe teachings are, in certain parts, similar to Confucianism, including an emphasis on sincerity, reverence, and trust, but Daesoon Jinrihoe diverges from the patriarchy and social hierarchy that characterize Confucianism. Daesoon Jinrihoe builds on terminology and ideas found in all of Korea's religious traditions. American scholar Don Baker called it the "quintessential Korean religion", arguing that Daesoon Jinrihoe is "more than the sum of its parts": not Buddhist, not Confucian, not Daoist, not inspired by Cheondoism, and not shamanistic, but all of these together and more. As mentioned earlier, the branches of the religion that divinize Park Wudang believe in a Trinity (similar to the beliefs of another Korean religion, Taejonggyo), in this case made up of Kang Jeungsan, Jo Jeongsan, and Park Wudang.

Followers believe that there will be a "Great Transformation", after which humans will live in a universe with no poverty, disease, or war, and with divine beings and human beings existing in a state of unification. They have a mantra, called T'aeulju, which they believe hastens the unification with Dao. Predictions about a specific date for the gaebyuck (개벽, literally "dawn of a new age"), or entrance into the earthly paradise, have been banned by the movement. However, some followers still engaged in these predictions in the 1980s and 1990s, including in 1984 and, according to Jorgensen, in connection with the 1988 Summer Olympics in Seoul.

== Activities ==
Daesoon Jinrihoe believes that the principle of Haewon sangsaeng should be realized in practice through three main social activities: charity aid, social welfare, and education. The movement is known in Korea for its centers of medical service and welfare for the elderly, including Jesaeng Hospital, and for the educational facilities, including Daejin University, which was founded in 1991, and six high schools. In addition to spiritual activities, the movement also campaigns on issues such as the environment, gender equality, reunification of Korea, and the achievement of world peace.

Every month, the members of Daesoon Jinrihoe make a monetary contribution, which is all sent to the head office. The movement reports that over 70% of the money collected then goes to the three major activities: relief and charity, social welfare, and education, and that a total of over 660 billion won (about 560 million USD) was allocated to those fields in the 39 years between 1975 and 2013. The movement also claims that Daesoon Jinrihoe "is a practical religion which actively puts its doctrines into action, and its activities are more influential and contributive than any other religions in Korea, from the viewpoint of its scale".

== Membership ==
The religion has a following among a wide variety of classes. It claims a membership of six million, although a 1995 survey by The Chosun Ilbo found it had 67,632 followers (sixth behind Wŏn Buddhism with 84,918 followers). A 2005 census revealed fewer than 35,000 Koreans claimed a belief in the religions derived from Kang Jeungsan, of which Daesoon Jinrihoe is one. The survey and census may have underestimated the number of followers, due to a lack of a specific category for Daesoon Jinrihoe and other new religions, and because followers have opted out of labeling themselves with a religious affiliation.

By the mid-1990s Daesun Jinrihoe had already over 1,500 centers, and the headquarters at Yeoju could house 10,000 people. In 2017, centers had become more than 2,000. The growth of the religion has been attributed to its ancestor worship, emphasis on self-cultivation, messianism and enlightenment, a focus on the present, and the stable system of its organization. According to Don Baker, "Daesoon doctrine also gains persuasive power from its focus on the ethical concerns that have been at the center of Korean religiosity for millennia".

== Criticism ==
Criticism of Daesoon Jinrihoe mostly comes from rival religions in the Kang Jeungsan lineage and Korean media hostile to local new religions in general. Daesoon Jinrihoe members made a habit of recruiting at large bookstores or in the Seoul underground; these members would ask passers-by if they were interested in Eastern thought and invite them to learn more, without mentioning Daesoon Jinrihoe. In the mid-1990s, the main Yeoju branch of Daesoon Jinrihoe confronted these problems and banned missionary activities in public places altogether. However, these practices are still carried on by some other branches. Jorgensen also reported that rumors of extortion and violence against opponents were common in the 1990s; the clergy were said to work without pay on the religion's projects, and be restricted to 4–5 hours of sleep a day during some of the movement’s "cultivation" practices.

== See also ==
- Bocheon-gyo
