= Jeungsanism =

Korean New Religious Movement

Jeungsanism (Korean: 증산교; RR: Jeungsangyo) is an English word with two different uses: as a synonym of Jeung San Do (증산도), a Korean new religious movement, or to designate a family of more than 100 Korean new religious movements that recognize Kang Jeungsan (Gang Il-Sun) as the incarnation of the Supreme God of the Universe, Sangje.

== Origins and divisions ==
Kang Jeungsan, recognized by his disciples as the Supreme God incarnated, died on June 24, 1909, at the Donggok Clinic he had established in 1908. Kang had not clearly designated a successor, and both his main disciples and some of his relatives established separate branches, which in turn separated into further rival organizations, generating more than 100 religious orders within the general family of Jeungsanism. All recognize Kang as Sangje, the Supreme God of the Universe, and believe that he reordered the whole universe through his mission and rituals, but they differ on who Kang's successors should have been. Some of them have divinized and worship as deities their own founders, or other leaders of Jeungsanism, in addition to Kang.

A number of branches trace their origins to Goh Pan-Lye (Subu, literally “Head Lady,” 1880-1935, although in Kang's circle there were two different "Subus"), a female disciple of Kang Jeungsan. Around September 1911, Goh gathered around her a number of Kang's followers. Eventually, Goh’s male cousin, Cha Gyeong-Seok (1880-1936), a leading disciple of Kang, became the leader of Goh's branch. Dissatisfied with this situation, Goh separated from Cha in 1919 and joined forces with Lee Sangho (1888–1967), who, together with his brother Lee Jeongnip (1895–1968), established various organizations and finally Jeungsangyo Headquarters. The Lees were the first and second patriarchs respectively of Jeungsangyo Headquarters.

In the 1920s, Cha's branch, known as Bocheon-gyo, became the largest Korean new religious movement and possibly the largest religion in Korea, with some six million followers. It declined rapidly after Cha's death in 1936, and fragmented into several competing groups, as did Goh's organization. The largest among the branches claiming a lineage originating from Goh is Jeung San Do, founded by Ahn Un-san (1922–2012), a former disciple of the Lee brothers, who established his first religious organization in 1945. After further divisions, Ahn founded the current Jeung San Do in 1974 together with his son, Ahn Gyeong-jeon (b. 1954). Jeung San Do believes that, as Kang was God the Father, Goh, revered with the title of Tae-mo-nim, was God the mother and between 1926 and 1935 performed her own reordering of the universe. Jeung San Do is the movement within Jeungsanism with the most visible presence abroad, although it is not the largest branch in Korea.

Another leading disciple of Kang Jeungsan was Kim Hyeong-Ryeol (1862–1932). He originally accepted Cha's leadership. In 1914, however, he left and established an independent religious order with Kang Jeungsan's widow, Jeong (1874–1928). While Jeungsanism in general believes that Sangje remained for thirty years in the giant Maitreya Buddha statue at the Geumsansa temple before incarnating as Kang Jeungsan, Kim's branch taught that, after he died, Kang took to reside again in the statue. Kim gained some support for this belief among the Buddhist monks at Geumsansa, but in 1922 was expelled from the monastery by the abbot, an incident that led to the decline of his branch.

Another important branch emerged in the 1920s around Jo Cheol-Je, known to his disciples as Jo Jeongsan (1895–1958). Jo had never personally met Kang, but claimed to have received a revelation from him in 1917. Eventually, he was recognized as the mysterious successor Kang had announced in his prophecies by the deceased Kang’s sister (Seondol, c. 1881 – 1942), mother (Kwon, 1850–1926) and daughter (Sun-Im, 1904–1959), although the daughter eventually started her own separate branch with her husband Kim Byeong-cheol (1905–1970). Sun-Im's branch, known as Jeung San Beob Jong Gyo, is headquartered in Korea's North Jeolla province, and after protracted litigation with other branches obtained the mortal remains of Kang, which are currently at its headquarters. Jo organized his movement as Mugeukdo in 1925, but had to disband it in 1941 due to the Japanese occupation of Korea and Japan's hostility to new religions. He reorganized it in 1948, and in 1950 changed its name into Taegeukdo, with headquarters in Busan. Jo died in 1958. His disciples continued as a single religious order until 1968, recognizing as Jo's successor Park Wudang (1918–1996, or 1917–1995 according to the lunar calendar normally used by the movement). In 1968, however, Park's authority was contested by a number of senior executives and by one of Jo's sons, Jo Yongnae, who opposed the reforms Park had introduced. The group opposed to Park kept the headquarters near Busan and the name Taegeukdo, while Park moved to Seoul and reorganized his branch in 1969 as Daesoon Jinrihoe. Although statistics are a matter of contention, Daesoon Jinrihoe seems to be the largest new religion in the Jeungsanism family, and possibly the largest Korean new religion in general. At Park's death in 1996, controversies erupted within Daesoon Jinrihoe between those advocating and those denying the deification of Park as a third divine figure, together with Kang and Jo. The branch that rejected the deification maintained the control of the headquarters in Yeoju and was followed by a large majority of the members, while another four branches (and possibly more) recognized Park as either a god or the Maitreya Buddha and separated from the main organization, with which two of them maintain, however, a dialogue.

== See also ==
- Gang Il-Sun
- Daesun Jinrihoe
- Jeung San Do
- Bocheonism
