= Bocheonism =

Korean new religious movement

- Hangul: 보천교
- Hanja: 普天敎
- RR: Bocheongyo
- MR: Poch'ŏn'gyo

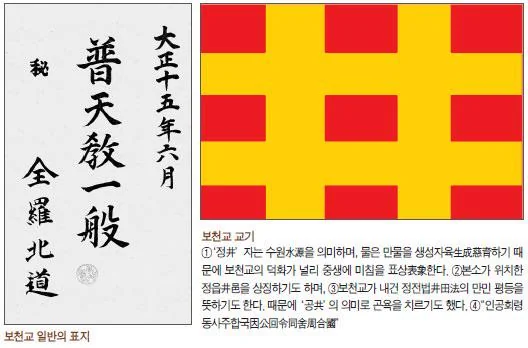

Bocheonism (Korean: 보천교; "religion of the vault of heaven/firmament") was one among more than 100 new religious movements of Korea of the family of religions called Jeungsanism, rooted in Korean shamanism and recognizing Gang Il-sun (Kang Jeungsan) as the incarnation of Sangje, the Supreme God. It was founded by Cha Gyeong-seok (1880–1936) on Ibam Mountain in Daeheung-ri, Ibam-myeon, Jeongeup, North Jeolla Province, in the year 1911. Today this site is part of Naejangsan National Park. Cha Gyeong-seok was originally a Donghak (Cheondoist) priest, who converted to Jeungsanism after meeting Gang Il-Sun. After Gang's death, Goh Pan-Lye (Subu, literally “Head Lady,” 1880–1935, although in Kang's circle there was more than one "Subu"), a female disciple of Kang Jeungsan, around September 1911 gathered around her a number of Kang's followers. Cha Gyeong-seok was Goh's male cousin and became the leader of Goh's branch. Dissatisfied with this situation, Goh separated from Cha in 1919 and established her own new religion. Cha continued under the name Bocheon-gyo, which was adopted in 1921, at a great ritual held in Hamyang County, South Gyeongsang Province. Eventually, Bocheonism became the largest Korean new religious movement and possibly the largest religion in Korea, with some six million followers, including leading activists in the Korean independence movements. Bocheonism, however, declined rapidly after Cha's death in 1936, and fragmented into several competing group, as did Goh's organization. The largest among these branches is Jeung San Do. Cha prophesied that the unification of the world would take place beginning in Korea. Branches of Bocheonism are also credited with encouraging local culture in the Jeongeup region, including the pungmulgut performance tradition.

== See also ==
- Cheondoism
- Jeungsanism
- Jeung San Do
- Daesun Jinrihoe
- Okhwangsangje

== Sources ==
- Kim Jaeyoung. Bocheongyo and Religions of Korea. Shin Achulpansa, 2010. Korean language only. ISBN 8959257052
- Lee Chi-ran. Chief Director, Haedong Younghan Academy. The Emergence of National Religions in Korea.
