= Jeung San Do =

South Korean new age religion

- Hangul: 증산도
- Hanja: 甑山道
- RR: Jeungsando
- MR: Chŭngsando

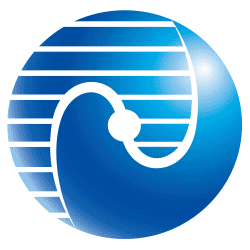
The symbol of Jeungsanist organisations.

Jeung San Do (Korean: 증산도), occasionally called Jeungsanism, meaning "The Dao/Tao of Jeung-san", although this term is better reserved for a larger family of movements, is a new religious movement founded in South Korea in 1974. Jeung San Do is known as the direct successor to Donghak(also known as Eastern Learning) and Bocheongyo. It is the most recognized movement from more than 100 Korean religious organizations that recognize and revere Gahng Il-sun (also known as Gahng Jeungsan, or Chungsan), an early 20th century religious leader who was known at the time as the Jeungsan Cheonsa(천사, 증산천사, divine teacher), as the incarnation and personification of Sangjenim (上帝任, the "governing God of the universe") and performed a "Renewal of Heaven and Earth(Cheonji-Gongsa)" through his mission and rituals. The religion is characterised by a universal message, millenarianism, and a method of healing meditation.

== History ==
Jeung San Do, along with several branches of Jeungsanism trace their origins to Goh Pan-Lye (Subu, literally "Head Lady or Highest Mother," 1880–1935, she is the main "Subu" of the three Subu according to Jeung San Do scriptures), a leading female disciple and the successor of the lineage of Gahng Jeungsan, according to Jeung San Do. Around September 1911, after Goh Subu attained enlightenment, most of the major disciples of Gahng's followers started gathering around Goh Subu. Eventually, Goh Subu's male cousin, Cha Gyeong-Seok (1880–1936), one of the leading disciples of Gahng, takes control of Goh's branch, and the dissatisfied disciples leave to start many separate groups of their own. In the 1920s, Cha's branch, known as Bocheon-gyo, became the largest Korean new religious movement and possibly the largest religion in Korea, with some 6 million followers. It, along with other Jeung San organizations, declined rapidly after Goh Subu's death in 1935 and Cha's death in 1936, and fragmented into several competing groups. Jeung San Do is the largest organization that succeeds the lineage originating from Goh Subu.

Jeung San Do was founded by Ahn Un-san (born in 1922), who established his first religious organization in 1945. After further divisions, Ahn founded Jeung San Do in 1974 together with his son, Ahn Gyeong-jeon (b. 1954). Jeung San Do believes that, as Gahng was God the Father, Goh, revered with the title of Tae-mo-nim, was God the mother and between 1926 and 1935 performed her own reordering of the universe. Jeung San Do is the movement within Jeungsanism with the most visible presence abroad, although it is not the largest branch in Korea. The central text of Jeungsanism, the Dojeon, was first published in Korean in 1992. The name "Dojeon" is used by other branches of Jeungsanism for their own, different sacred texts. Jeung San Do's version contains a detailed description of Jeungsan Sangjenim's and Taemonim's ("Great Mother") lives and of Cheonjigongsa, the "Renewal of Heaven and Earth". The Jeungsanist theory stresses the concept of Tao, the way of nature.

Jeungsanism is often understood as having succeeded the lineage of Korean shamanism known as Shingyo, and is defined as one of the Korean indigenous religions.

== Etymology ==
Jeung San Do means "the Way [dao/do/Tao, 道] of the Jeung(甑)[siru] San(山)[mountain]". The word "jeung" is siru in Korean, which is Korean food streamer vessel for cooking Korean rice cakes, Tteok (떡). It signifies a vast vessel by metaphor that can contain everything in the world. To conclude, "jeung" (甑) denotes the process of rising, maturation, fruition or growth.

"Jeung san" is also a traditional Korean descriptive term for the highest mountain in a region or "steamer mountain". "Do" (道) denotes Tao, the way. Considered as a whole, therefore, the name "Jeung San Do" signifies the highest truth that surpasses all existing religions and teachings.

== Teachings ==
Sangjenim means "Highest Emperor", and is cognate of the Chinese Shangdi. It is the governing spirit of the universe, and Jeung San Do believe he was incarnated as Gang Il-sun, although God for Jeung San Do also exists as God the mother, incarnated on earth as Goh Pan-Lye.

Jeung San Do teaches that, at the age of seven, Sangjenim attained a sudden spiritual awakening while watching a performance of traditional music and dance. When he was twenty-four, he witnessed the tumultuous events of the Donghak (Eastern Learning) Uprising in which an ill-equipped but determined army of farmers fought the troops of both the Korean government and the Japanese. This insurrection sparked a war between China and Japan fought on the Korean Peninsula and ended with the crushing defeat of the farmers and Japan's annexation of the country. After observing the death and misery brought on by these events, Jeung San Sangjenim resolved to save the world from suffering.

He traveled for three years to observe human behavior and the shape, qi, and spirit of the land. In 1901, after a period of intensive meditation he attained perfect enlightenment into the affairs of Heaven, Earth, and humanity. About this he said:

Since ancient times, a few have mastered the writing of the Heavens, a few have mastered the principles of Earth, but no one has mastered the nature of humans. I am the first to master the nature of humans.

- Dojeon 2:13:4-5

In that year, Sangjenim began a spiritual work that cannot be easily explained or understood. It was called the work of renewing Heaven and Earth (天地公事). For 9 years, he conducted works of renewal in the form of rituals, proclamations, and conversations with humans and spirits and utilized the qi of various places and people. He established a federation of gods called the Creative Government, composed of regional gods, the founding spirits of family lines, gods that founded and advanced civilizations, enlightened spirits, spirits with unresolved bitterness and grief, and the spirits of revolutionaries. With this assembly of spirits, he intended to correct the wrongs of the past and chart a new course for the future. His work of renewing Heaven and Earth shifted the course of Heaven, Earth, and humanity and planted the seeds for a new enlightened and harmonious world of humans and gods.

According to his followers, Sangjenim differed from other prophets in that he not only spoke about the future but, through his spiritual work, actually transformed it. One way of understanding this is the Butterfly Effect in Edward Lorenz's Chaos Theory. According to that theory, a butterfly flapping its wings in America could cause or prevent a tornado in Indonesia. This of course illustrates the improbability of predicting any event in a highly complex system due to the difficulty of knowing all variables. But, what if someone were enlightened to the point of omnipotence? What if someone did know all the variables? Such a person could not only predict the future, but with the rippling effect of seemingly small actions could actually change the future.

About the method he used in the work of renewal, Sangjenim said:

There are opportunities for human action ... There is a program for each heavenly principle. The work of renewal is based on creating the opportunity and establishing the program. If I were to abandon this method and perform the work forcibly, it would bring disaster upon the world and kill multitudes. That is not My intention.

- Dojeon 2:55:7-8

=== Cosmic year ===
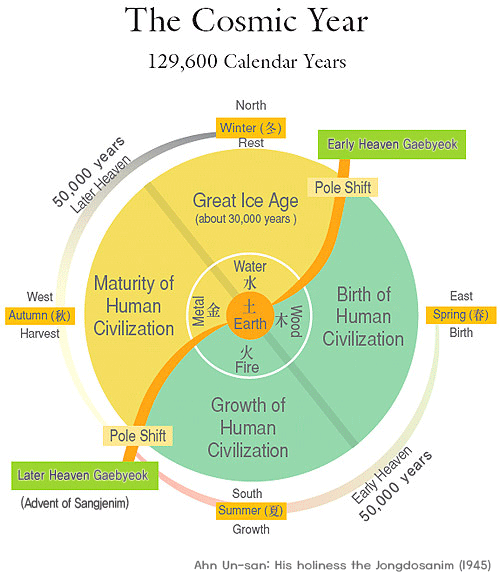
The "cosmic year" of Jeung San Do.

According to Jeun Sang Do, Gang Il-sun revealed to humanity that the universe embodies a four-fold cycle. A "cosmic year" contains four cosmic seasons corresponding to birth, growth, harvest, and rest.

== Views on Modern Korean history ==
According to Jeung San Do, the History of Korea is that of a chessboard used by America, China, Russia, and Japan. While the Empire of Japan completed the annexation of Korea in 1910, they were merely pawns or workmen (ilkkun) of Sangjenim; racial brothers who saved Korea from domination by the Western great powers. The Japanese, according to this narrative, provided the "service" (pongsa) of modernizing Korea as penance for the Japanese invasions of Korea (1592–1598). Accordingly, resistance against Japan was ill-advised, and Chinilpa collaborationist organizations such as Iljinhoe should not be condemned. Koreans merely had to "wait patiently", as Jeung San Do taught, for the guests to vacate the board in order to assume ownership of the Korean Peninsula.

== Vocabulary ==
- Sangjenim
- Taemonim (太母)
- Gaebyeok
- Taeeul ju
- Wonsibanbon (returning to the origin)
- Haewon (resolution of bitterness and grief)
- Sangsaeng (mutual life-giving)
- Boeun (offering gratitude and repayment)
- Dojeon
- Dojang (temple) - Dao center
- Cosmic year - Shao Yung (AD 1011–1077)
- Euitong (to heal and to unite)
- Cheonjigongsa (renewal of Heaven and Earth) 天地公事
- Nam Sa-go
- Hwacheonjeol (化天節):The death day of Gang Il-sun.

== See also ==
- Sinism
- Taoism
- Gang Il-sun
- Bocheon-gyo
- Daesun Jinrihoe

== Sources ==
- Jeung San Do Dojeon Publication Society, The Jeung San Do Dojeon
- Jeung San Do Dojeon Publication Society, The Cosmic Autumn Approaches: Select Passages From the Dojeon: "The Holy Scriptures of Dao"
- Jeung San Do Dojeon Publication Society, The illustrated dojeon: An Abridged Introduction to the Jeung San Do Dojeon, 2009
- Ahn Gyung-jun, Autumn Calling, 2001
- Readings in JeungSanDo homepage: Dao Talk I, Dao Talk II
- Introduction of Jeung San Do Dojeon.
