= Korean new religions =

Korean new religions are new religious movements established in Korea. In Korean, they are called shinheung jonggyo ("new religions" 新興宗教). Most of these religious sects started during the late period of the Joseon Dynasty, due to traditionalist backlash against Catholicism and political activists looking for new ways to express faith.

Most Korean new religions are offshoots of the Donghak movement.

== Background for creation ==
The Joseon dynasty publicly applied Neo-Confucian principles in everyday life, however this was very far from what the public believed due to the rejection of concept of spirits in Korean Neo Confucianism. The fall of traditional hierarchies in the late 19th century exacerbated the need of the public for a new religion. The religions flourished during the farmer riots of the 19th century. A new surge of believers occurred during the Korean War in the 1950s From the 1970s onward, the focus of Korean religious movements shifted from rural areas to urban regions, which the Unification movement being considered an exemplar of this change of trends in new religious movements.

== List ==
Name	Founder	Founded	Description
Gaksedo 각세도(覺世道)	Lee Seon-pyeong 이선평(李仙枰)	1915	The "Four Great Truths": Confucianism, Buddhism, "Seongyo" (仙敎) (basically meaning Taoism), and Christianity
Gaksedo Cheonji Wonligyo 각세도천지원리교(覺世道天地原理敎)/ Gaksedogye 각세도계(覺世道系)	Lee Seong-jae 이성재(李成宰)	1975	Gaksedo, Seon Buddhism
Gamlobeobhoe/Gamrobeophoe 감로법회(甘露法會)	Kim Ki-seon 김기선(金基瑄)	1925	Korean Buddhism, particularly the worship of Guanyin, Kṣitigarbha, "Mita Buddha" 미타여래(彌陀如來), "Yaksa Buddha" 약사여래(藥師如來), and "Jeongwang Buddha" 정광여래(淨光如來; "Pure Light Tathagata")
Gaecheonhakhoe ("Gacheon Academy/Association" 개천학회(開天學會))	Ho-Sang Ahn 설립자안호상(安浩相), Ho-Soo Song 송호수(宋鎬洙)	1963	Hongik Ingan
Gaetaedogwangsa ("Gaetaedo Gwangsa Temple" 개태도광사(開泰道光寺))	Kim Kwang-young (김광영(金光榮))	1936	worship of Dangun and Maitreya
Gaengjeong Yudo 갱정유도(更定儒道)	Daesung Kang (설립자강대성(姜大成))	1945	A Bocheonism-influenced fusion of Confucianism, Buddhism, and Korean folk religion
Gondogyo 곤도교(坤道敎)	Jacha Gap Soon 자차갑순(車甲順)	1956	Gaksedogye
Gwanseonggyo 관성교(關聖敎)	Ki-Hong Park 박기홍(朴基洪), Yong-Sik Kim 김용식(金龍植)	1920	worship of Guan Yu
Gwangmyeongdaedo ("Gwangmyeong University" 광명대도(光明大道)) / Dangun Cheonjo Gwangmyeong Daedeok Bobonhoe 단군천조광명대도덕보본회(檀君天祖光明大道德報本會)	Jeong Yo-sun 자정요순(鄭驍橓)	1947	worship of Dangun
Gwanghwagyo 광화교(光華敎)	Kimchi-in (김치인(金致寅))	1888	Korean Buddhism
Gukjodangungugyo 국조단군국교(國祖檀君國敎)	Kim Eok-sun 김억순(金億順)	1962	worship of Dangun
Gwiimdo 귀임도(歸任道)	Lee Sang-je 이상제(李相濟)	1956	Gaksedo
Geuliseudoguwonseonsinsaeng-won ("Christ's Salvation Line" 그리스도구원선신생원)	Park Yeon-ryong 박연룡(朴淵龍)	1956	Christianity
Geumgangdaedo 금강대도(金剛大道)	Seung-Yeo Lee 이승여(李承如)	1874	The "Three Paths" of "Yu-Bul-Seon" 유·불·선: Confucianism, Buddhism, and Korean Seon (conceived as different from regular Buddhism, and essentially identical to Taoism)
Gidokgyobokeumchimnyehoe ("Christian Gospel Baptist Church")기독교복음침례회(基督敎福音浸禮會)	Changwa Kwonsin 권신찬과, Yoo Byung-eon 유병언은	1962	Baptist Christianity
Namjoseonsin-ang ("South Korean Faith" 남조선신앙(南朝鮮信仰))	Lee Sang-kyung 이상경(理想境)	1862	South Korean nationalism, Donghak, Jeong-gamlogsin-ang-eun 정감록신앙은, Three Jewels of Fortune 삼절운수설(三絶運數說), Gyeryongsan Cheondo 계룡산천도설(鷄龍山遷都說), the theory of the emergence of Jeongseongjin 정성진인출현설(鄭姓眞人出現說)
Namhak ("Southern School" 남학(南學))	Lee Woon-gyu 이운규(李雲圭)	1862	"Yu-Bul-Seon" 유·불·선, the fusion of Confucianism, Buddhism, and Korean Seon (conceived as different from regular Buddhism, and essentially identical to Taoism)
Dangunsamyo ("Dangunsa Temple" 단군사묘(檀君祠廟))	during the reign of Chungnyeol of Goryeo	late 13th century	worship of Dangun
Dangunseongjobong-an-yeonhabhoe ("Dangun Seongjo Bonan Association" 단군성조봉안연합회(檀君聖祖奉安聯合會))	Jung So-ah (정소아(鄭小阿))	1958	worship of Dangun
Dangunseongjosudowon ("Dangun Seongjo Monastery" 단군성조수도원(檀君聖祖修道院))	Kang Gil-ryong 강길룡(姜吉龍	1962	worship of Dangun
Dandanhaghoe ("Dandan Society" 단단학회(檀檀學會))	Lee Yoo-rip 이유립(李裕岦)	1966	worship of Haneullim, Hwanung, and Dangun
Danbaekgyo 단백교(檀百敎)	Kim Pan-rye 김판례(金判禮)	1955	worship of Dangun and Gapgwijamo (비서갑귀자모(匪西岬鬼子母))
Hwanghwanggyo 황황교(皇皇敎)	Yoon-Won Yoon 윤윤원(尹尹源)	1960	worship of the Cheonjonsansin ("Heavenly Mountain God" 천존산신(天尊山神)), the Dragon King, "Sinjang" (신장) (short for "Obang Shinjang", "Spirit Generals of the Five Directions" (오방신장, 五方神將)), Dangun, Chilseong, and Shakyamuni Buddha
Hongyikgyo 홍익교(弘益敎)	Lee Chan-young (이찬영, 李贊榮)	1961	worship of Dangun, Jeungsan, and Su-un.
Baekbaekgyo 백백교(白白敎)	Wookwanghyun(우광현,禹光鉉)	1923 (currently dissolved)	Influenced by Choe Je-u and Donghak.
Ilshimgyo			Combination of Confucian ethics, Korean Buddhist nature worship, and Taoist self-cultivation.
Taejonggyo			Combination of Confucian ethics, Korean Buddhist nature worship, and Taoist self-cultivation.
Muryeong Cheondo			Combination of Confucian ethics, Korean Buddhist nature worship, and Taoist self-cultivation.
The Pongnam			Combination of Confucian ethics, Korean Buddhist nature worship, and Taoist self-cultivation.
Todoeokhoe			Combination of Confucian ethics, Korean Buddhist nature worship, and Taoist self-cultivation.
Cheongilhoe			Combination of Confucian ethics, Korean Buddhist nature worship, and Taoist self-cultivation.
