= Suunism =

Korean ethnic religion

- Hangul: 수운교
- Hanja: 水雲敎
- RR: Suungyo
- MR: Suun'gyo

Suunism (Korean: 수운교; Hanja: 水雲敎) is one of the Korean ethnic religions derived from Sinism. It is a splinter from Cheondoism that in turn originated as an organised formation of the Donghak movement. "Suwun" was another name used by Choe Je-u. Suwunists claim to have transmitted a purer version of his teaching.

The religion's headquarters are located in Daejeon, where Suwun himself moved in 1829 after having preached in Seoul since 1823. The religion focuses on the worship of Okhwangsangje Haneullim (the "Great Jade Emperor of Heaven"), in order to make the earth a paradise through the reconnection to the One. An important symbol of the faith is Gungeul ("Archer Bird"). The doctrine includes belief in the Maitreya.

== See also ==
- Confucianism
- Taoism in Korea
- Donghak Peasant Revolution

== Sources ==
- Lee Chi-ran. Chief Director, Haedong Younghan Academy. The Emergence of National Religions in Korea.
