= Eastern religions =

Religions that originated in East, South and Southeast Asia

The Eastern religions are the religions which originated in East, South and Southeast Asia and thus have dissimilarities with Western and African religions. Eastern religions include:

- East Asian religions such as Taoism, Confucianism, Chinese folk religion, Shinto, and Korean shamanism
- Dharmic religions or Indian religions such as Hinduism, Buddhism, Jainism, and Sikhism
- Southeast Asian religions such as Vietnamese folk religion and Kejawen

The East-West religious distinction (just like the East-West culture distinction, and the implications that arise from it) is broad and not precise. Furthermore, geographical distinctions have less meaning in the current context of global transculturation.

While many Western observers attempt to distinguish between Eastern philosophies and religions, this is a distinction that does not exist in some Eastern traditions.

== Dharmic religions ==
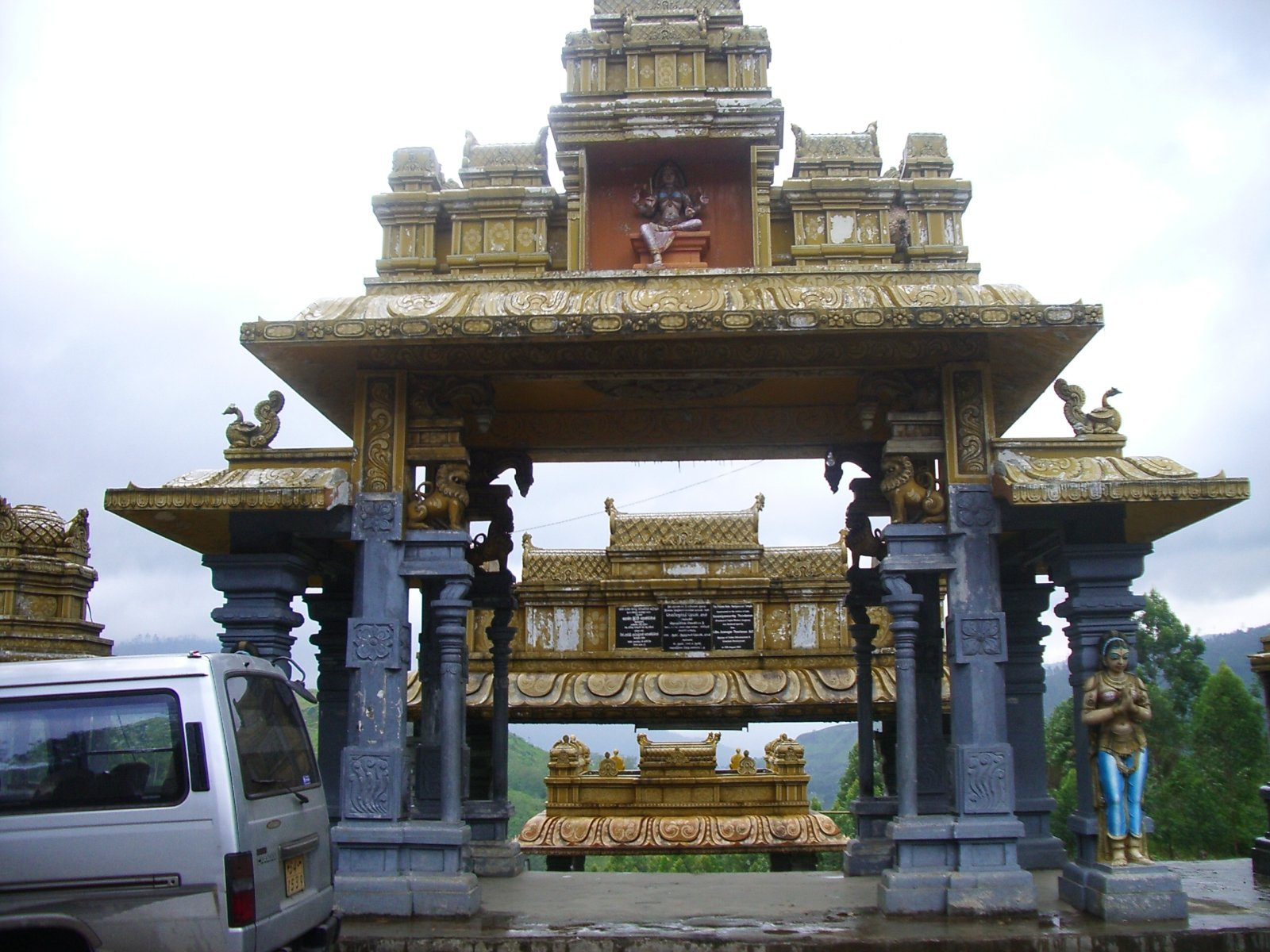
A Hindu temple in Sri Lanka.

Hinduism, Buddhism, Jainism, and Sikhism originated in the Indian subcontinent and share similar concepts (e.g., dharma, karma, moksha).

=== Hinduism ===
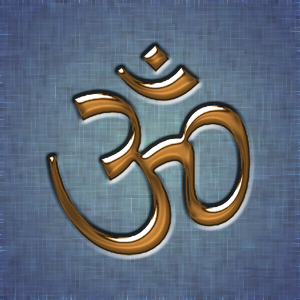
OM, a sacred syllable and a quintessential symbol of Hinduism

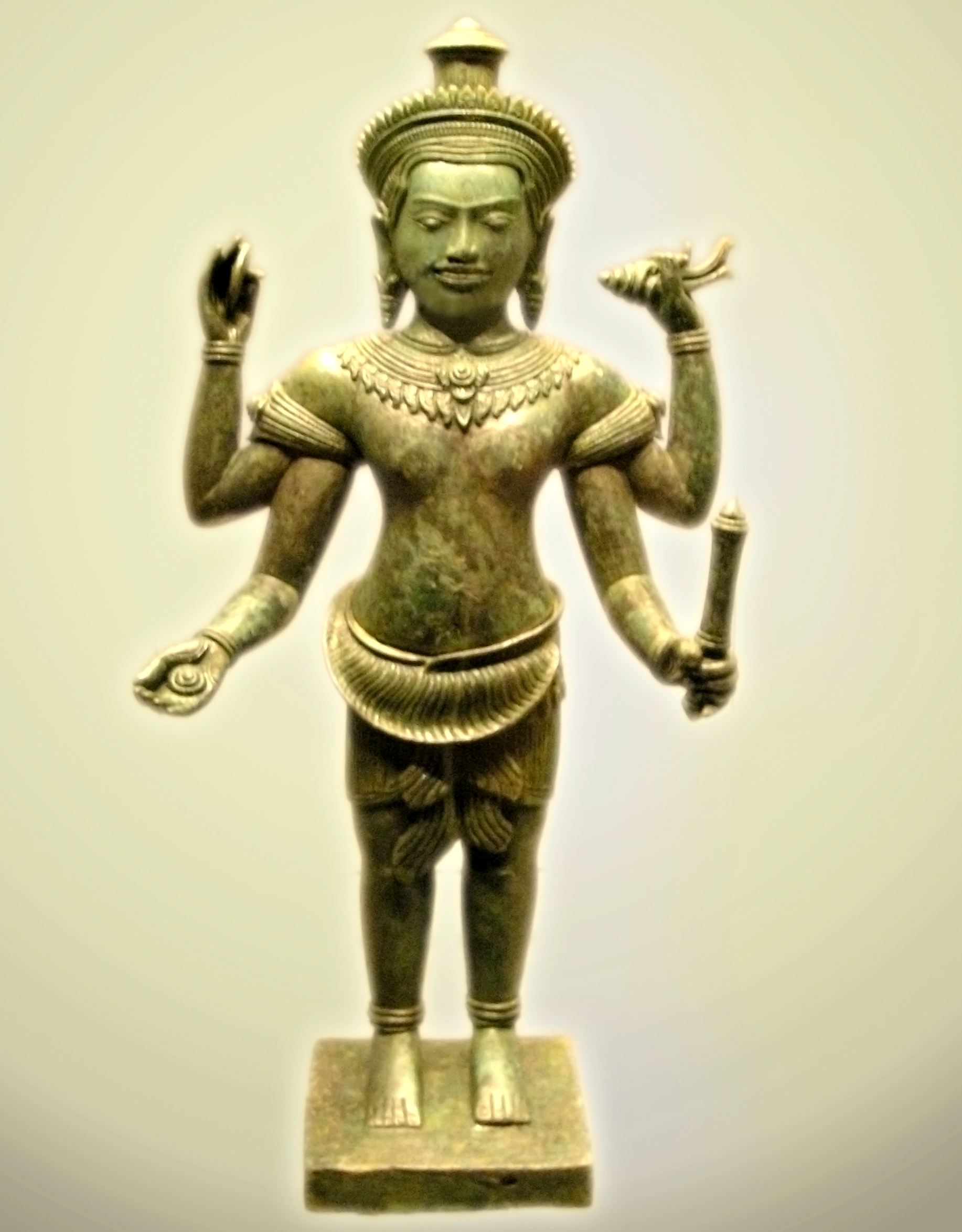
A 13th-century Cambodian statue of Vishnu.

Hinduism originated on the Indian subcontinent and was related to many other religious traditions outside the subcontinent, in places like ancient Central Asia and ancient Iran. It is considered by some to be the world's oldest extant major religion. Some consider Hinduism to originate from the Indus Valley civilization along with animism of the pre-Harappan migrants as well as the Indo-Aryan migrants. Hinduism contains a vast body of scripture, divided as revealed and remembered, expounding on dharma, or religious living. Hindus consider the Vedas and the Upanishads as being among the foremost in authority, importance and antiquity. The Bhagavad Gītā, a treatise excerpted from the Mahābhārata, is sometimes called a summary of the spiritual teachings of the Vedas. It is difficult to identify any universal belief or practice in Hinduism, although prominent themes include: Dharma, Samsara, Karma, and Moksha. Hinduism is sometimes called a polytheistic religion, but this is an oversimplification. Hinduism includes a diverse collection of schools whose beliefs span monotheism, polytheism, pantheism, monism and even atheism. For instance, the Advaita Vedanta school holds that there is only one causal entity (Brahman), which manifests itself into all the various living and non-living forms that we observe, whereas traditions such as Vaishnavism and Shaivism worship Vishnu and Shiva in a relatively more monotheistic sense (caused by a differentiation between the parabrahman and atman). A number of scholars even consider the Samkhya school of thought to have atheistic leanings.

=== Buddhism ===
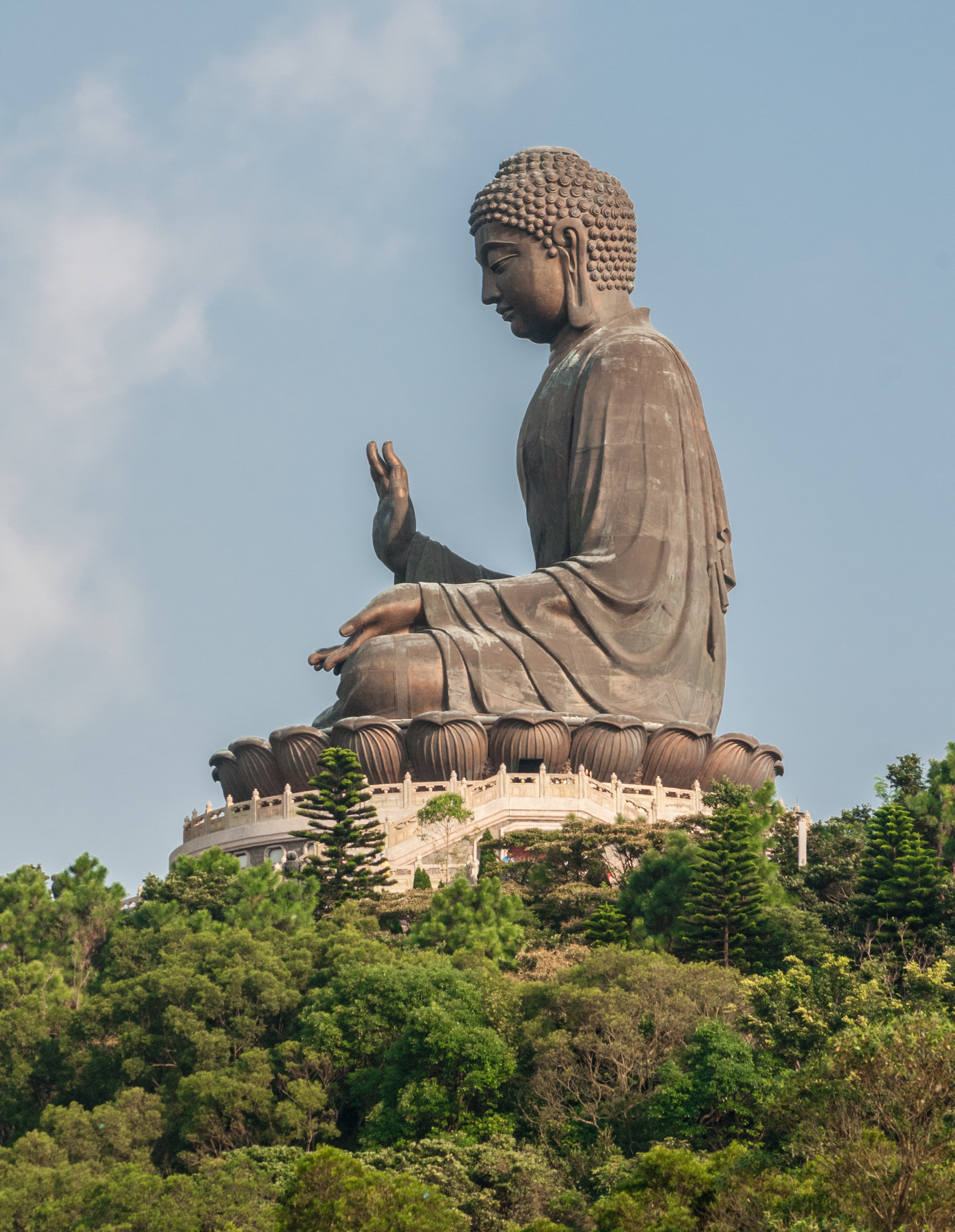
The Tian Tan Buddha statue of Buddha in Hong Kong.

Buddhism is a non-theistic Dharmic religion and philosophy. Buddhism was founded around the 5th century BCE in present-day Nepal by Siddhartha Gautama, known to his followers as the Buddha, with the Four Noble Truths and the Noble Eightfold Path as its central principles. According to the scriptures, the Four Noble Truths were revealed by the Buddha in his first sermon after attaining enlightenment. The main schools of Buddhism are divided into Theravada, Mahayana and Vajrayana. In academic circles, Mahayana is further divided into East Asian and Tibetan Buddhism. Buddhism teaches that life is duḥkha or suffering and the primary goal of Buddhism is the liberation of the practitioner from samsara or the endless cycle of death and rebirth. Buddhists hold that Buddhahood or Enlightenment is the solution to the problem of suffering.

=== Jainism ===
Jain emblem

Jainism is the religion of the followers of the Jinas or Tirthankars (torch bearers and spiritual teachers of dharma). Parshvanatha and Mahavira, the 23rd and 24th Tirthankars, respectively, revived the Jain religion and re-organized the shraman sangha. Jains highlight the practice of austerity. Jain philosophy states that the jiva, or soul, can escape the cycle of rebirth and death by freeing itself from karmic bondages. When nothing remains but the purity of the jiva, that person is called a jina, or winner, which is the origin of the term Jain. Karma is viewed as an accumulation that burdens the soul, causing attachment and suffering. Ahimsa, or non-violence, is central to Jain faith, philosophy and practice. It is interpreted very strictly as prohibiting all forms of harm to other living beings. Due to this, Jainism requires a strict vegetarian lifestyle. Ahimsa also applies to speaking, as one's words can cause harm and suffering.

=== Sikhism ===
Khanda (Sikh symbol)

Sikhism is a religion which began in Punjab of Northern India. It is founded on the teachings of Guru Nanak Dev and the nine human gurus that followed. He received a vision to preach the way to enlightenment and God in Sultanpur. His views rejected the traditional worships and caste of the Hindu faith. Freedom from reincarnation is tied to remembrance and repetition on one universal God. In Sikhism, God is Nirankar, a formless and shapeless one. Sikhs believe that there is one universal God who is the ultimate creator, sustainer, and destroyer. The Gurū Granth Sāhib are the central scriptures intended to preserve hymns and the teachings of the Sikh Gurus and other saints from Hindu and Sufi traditions. Rituals, religious ceremonies or empty worship are considered of little use and Sikhs are discouraged from fasting or going on pilgrimages. The tenets of Sikhism include (1) honest living/earning (2) tithing and giving alms (3) chanting on God. Sikhism also has a strong warrior tradition which arose in defense of religious freedom and human rights from a tyrannical Moghul occupation of India.

== East Asian religions ==
The group of East Asian religions or philosophies, also known as Taoic religions, may be considered as forming a group within world religions comparable to the Abrahamic or Dharmic groups. The Taoic faiths claim at least 500 million members worldwide.

=== Taoism ===
Taoism, also known as Daoism, comprises a variety of related religious and philosophical traditions. Categorization of Taoist sects and movements is very controversial. Taoist propriety and ethics places an emphasis on the Three Jewels of the Tao; love, moderation, humility. Taoist theology focuses on doctrines of wu wei ("non-action"), spontaneity, humanism, relativism and emptiness.

Most traditional Chinese Taoists are polytheistic. Taoism or Daoism is a type of belief, or a way of thinking about life. It is at least 2,500 years old and it comes from China. Taoism is now said to be a philosophy. Tao (or Dao, 道) is the name of the force or the "Way" that Taoists believe makes everything in the world. There are disagreements regarding the proper composition of this pantheon. Popular Taoism typically presents the Jade Emperor as the head deity. Intellectual, or "elite", Taoism usually presents Laozi and the Three Pure Ones at the top of the pantheon. Nature and ancestor spirits are common in popular Taoism. But this sort of shamanism is eschewed for an emphasis on internal alchemy among the "elite" Taoists. Tao itself is rarely an object of worship, being treated more like the South Asian concept of atman.

=== Confucianism ===
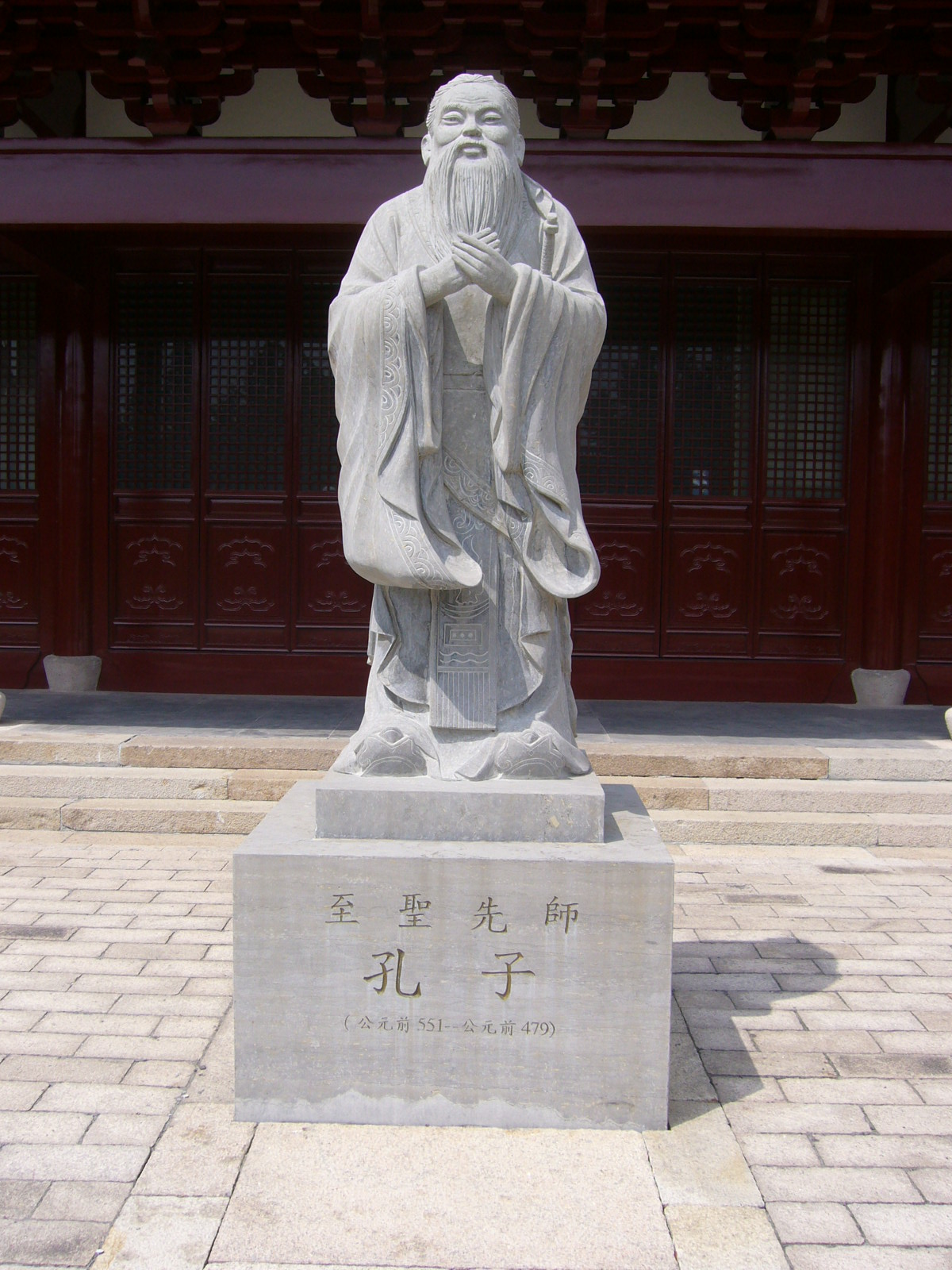
Statue of Confucius on Chongming Island in Shanghai

Confucianism is a complex system of moral, social and political thought, influential in the history of East Asia. It is highly debated amongst scholars whether Confucianism is a religion or simply an ethical system. The Chinese Communist Party does not recognize it as a religion. It is commonly associated with legalism but it rejects legalism for ritualism. It also endorses meritocracy as the ideal of nobility. Confucianism has a complicated system governing duties and etiquette in relationships. Confucian ethics focus on familial duty, loyalty and humaneness.

There are organizations that specifically promote Confucianism as a religion in Indonesia (Supreme Council for the Confucian Religion in Indonesia) and Hong Kong (Confucian Academy).

Confucianism tolerates the Chinese folk recognition of the existence of animistic spirits, ghosts and deities. It approves paying them proper respect, but at a more fundamental level encourages avoiding them. Confucian thought is notable as the framework upon which the syncretic Neo-Confucianism was built.

=== Shinto ===
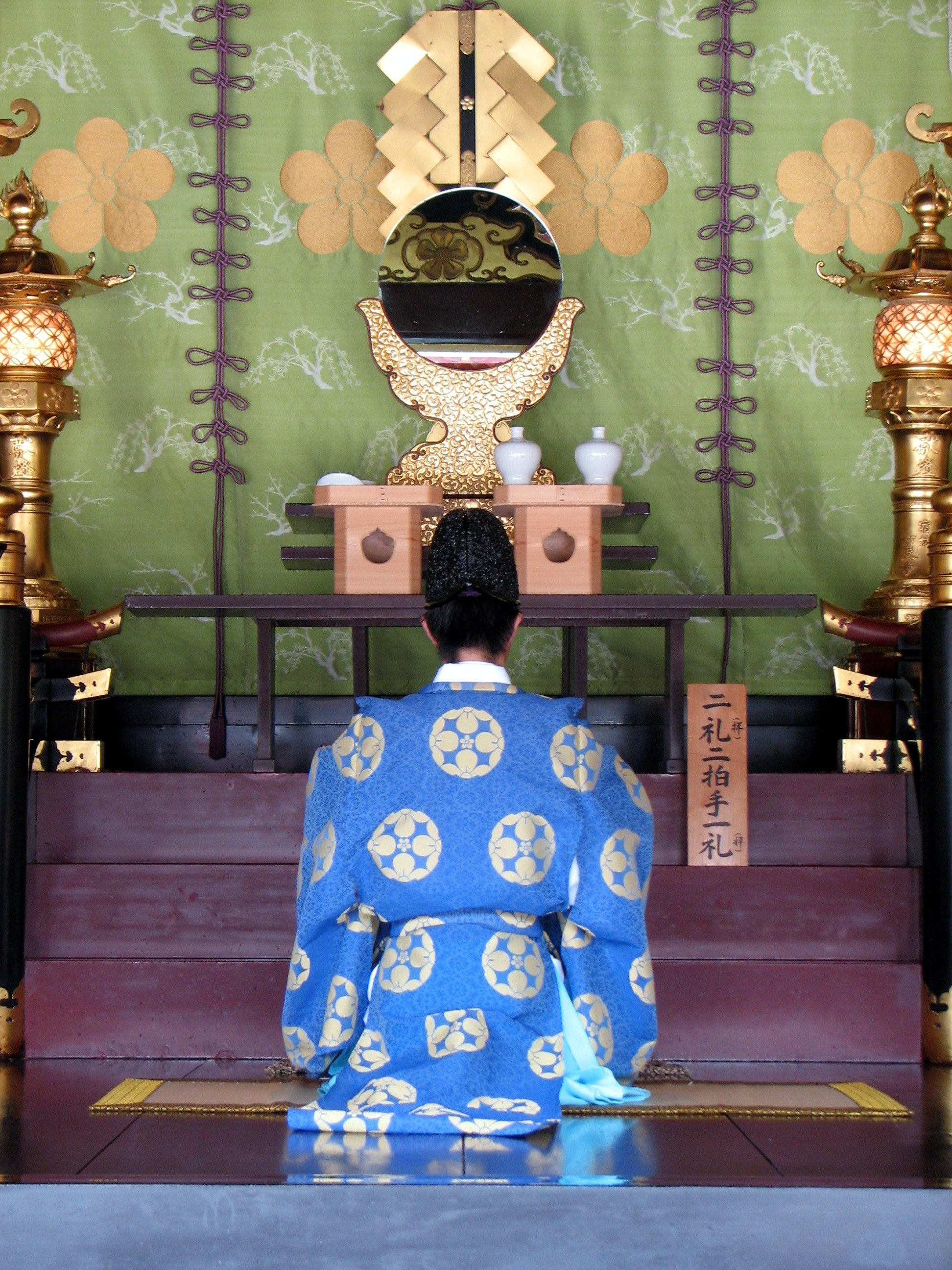
A Shinto priest kneeling before a shrine.

Shinto is an animistic folk religion practiced in Japan. Shinto literally means "the way of the gods". Many Japanese Shintoists also identify themselves as Buddhists. Japanese Pure Land Buddhism is deeply intertwined with the Shinto faith. Shinto practitioners commonly affirm tradition, family, nature, cleanliness and ritual observation as core values. Taoic influence is significant in their beliefs about nature and self-mastery.

Ritual cleanliness is a central part of Shinto life. Shrines have a significant place in Shinto, reflecting the animistic veneration of the kami. "Folk", or "popular", Shinto places an emphasis on shamanism, particularly divination, spirit possession and faith healing. "Sect" Shinto is a diverse group including mountain-worshippers and Confucian Shintoists.

== Shamanism and animism ==
Shamanism and animism have historically been practised in Asia, and is still practiced in most of Asia.

=== Northeast Asia ===
- Mongolian shamanism
- Tengrism
- Korean shamanism
- Ainu religion
- Ko-Shintō
- Turkic Shamanism

==== China ====
- Chinese shamanism
- Manchu shamanism
- Northeast China folk religion
- Nuo folk religion
- Bon

=== Southeast Asia ===
- Đạo Mẫu
- Thánh Trần worship
- Vietnamese folk religion
- Nội Đạo Tràng
- Burmese Folk Religion
- Tai folk religion

== Others ==
=== Chinese ===
- Chan Buddhism
- Chinese salvationist religions
  - Xiantiandao
  - Yiguandao
- Falun Gong
- Luoism
- Wang Hao-te
- Yao folk religion

=== Dravidian ===
- Dravidian folk religion

=== Japanese ===
- Japanese Buddhism
- Ryukyuan religion
- Shugendō
- Tenrikyo

=== Korean ===
- Cheondoism
- Daejongism
- Daesun Jinrihoe
- Gasin faith
- Jeung San Do
- Seon Buddhism
- Suwunism
- Won Buddhism

=== Nāstik (Heterodox Indian) ===
- Ajivika
- Ajñana
- Buddhism
- Charvaka
- Jainism

=== Nepalese religions ===
- Bön (Tibet / Nepal)
- Kirat Mundhum
- Newar Buddhism

=== Tai and Miao ===
- Ahom religion
- Mo religion (Zhuang Shigongism)
- Tai folk religion

=== Tibeto-Burmese ===
- Bon
- Burmese folk religion
- Benzhuism
- Bimoism
- Bathouism
- Bongthingism
- Donyi-Polo
- Heraka
- Kiratism
- Qiang folk religion
- Sanamahism

=== Vietnam ===
- Thiền Buddhism
- Trúc Lâm
- Đạo Mẫu
- Đạo Bửu Sơn Kỳ Hương
- Hòa Hảo
- Caodaism
- Đạo Dừa

== See also ==
- Comparative religion
- Eastern culture
- Folk religion
- List of religions
  - List of ethnic religions
- Historical Vedic religion
