= Battle of Ugeumchi =

1894 battle in the Donghak Peasant Revolution

- Part of Donghak Peasant Revolution
Date	22 October to 10 November 1894
Location	Ugeumchi, Gongju, Korea
Result	Alliances victory

Belligerents
Kingdom of Joseon; Joseon Army; Empire of Japan; Japanese Army	Donghak Peasant Army

Commanders and leaders
(Korea) Shin Jeong-hui; Heo Jin; Yi Du-hwang; Yi Gyu-tae; Yi Gi-dong; Jo Byeong-hwan; Minami; Morio Masaichi	Jeon Bong-jun; Son Byeong-hui

Strength
(Korea) 3,000; 400: 810 Joseon troops engaged; 120 Japanese troops engaged	Approximately 40,000 rebels 50 Qing soldiers

Casualties and losses
Minimal	500 remained

The Battle of Ugeumchi (Korean: 우금치전투; Hanja: 牛金峙戰鬪) took place in the Ugeumchi area, from October 23 to November 11, 1894 (31st year of Emperor Gojong). It was a conflict between different factions, including the Donghak peasant army, the Capital Guards Command (Chingunyeong (친군영)) consisting of the Palace Guards (Gyeongricheong), Royal Escort Palace Guards (Jangwiyeong), and the Metropolitan Guards (Tongwiyeong), and the new well-trained Japanese-style Military Training Division (Hullyeondae), which were the elite forces of the Joseon government equipped with modern weapons and tactics. Despite the overwhelming numerical advantage of the peasant army, they were unable to break through the defensive line of the suppressing forces, who had superior weapons and tactics. The defeat in Ugeumchi led to the rapid disintegration of the peasant army and the loss of momentum in the Donghak Peasant Revolution.

== Background ==
The Joseon government, seeing the suppression of the Donghak Peasant Revolution, requested military assistance from the Qing and Japan. However, Japan, with the aim of strengthening its influence in Korea and interfering in its internal affairs, needed a pretext to keep its troops stationed in Korea. Under the pretext of suppressing the revolution, the Japanese troops that entered Korea occupied Gyeongbokgung Palace on June 21, 1894, and forced King Gojong and the Daewongun to establish a new cabinet based on the model of a constitutional monarchy. Japan's intention was to break the traditional tributary relationship between Korea and Qing under a new regime's name and create an excuse to provoke a war between Qing and Japan. As a result of the illegal occupation of Gyeongbokgung Palace by the Japanese army, the Donghak Peasant Army's Second Uprising began in earnest in early September.

== Samrye Council ==
Jeon Bong-jun and his army of about 4,000 people decided to initiate the uprising in Samrye, Jeollabuk-do, a strategic location with wide geographical influence. There, Jeon Bong-jun established a headquarters and worked to unite the peasant army. He chose Gongju as the primary target for the first attack aimed at defeating the government army and the Japanese army and advancing to Hanyang. The Donghak army's strategy was to surround Gongju from Buyeo and Nonsan.

He launched attacks on nearby districts to secure weapons and provisions. Although Jeon Bong-jun began preparations for the uprising at the end of August, the actual march north started about a month later, at the end of September. Several reasons influenced this timing. First, Jeon Bong-jun himself was ill. Additionally, the harvest had not yet been completed, so there were limitations in mobilizing supplies and the peasant army. This was an important consideration regarding the practical capacity of the peasant army, which was limited to the Jeolla Province region. Therefore, while waiting for the end of the harvest season, Jeon Bong-jun made efforts to gather allied forces to join the uprising. He petitioned the leader of the Donghak religious movement at the time, Choi Si-hyeong, to participate in the "Gipo" and gather the forces of the Donghak army nationwide. He also sent letters to various Donghak leaders, urging them to understand the significance of the "Gipo" and join the uprising. As a result, peasant army leaders from the regions of Geumgu, Jeonju, Jeongeup, Buan, and Jinan gathered their respective peasant armies and joined forces in Samrye.

On October 9, the main forces of the peasant army, consisting of over 40,000 rebels, gathered in Samrye. As soon as the Donghak Peasant Army began its sewing ritual, they marched north to Nonsan under the command of General Jeon Bong-jun and commanders like Son Hwa-jung (1861–1895) and Kim Deok-myeong and stationed themselves in Gyeongcheon, located 30 li (about 12.5 kilometers) away from Gongju, after passing through Noseongju. Meanwhile, Choi Si-hyeong (1827–1898), who advocated for peaceful negotiations, accepted the pretext of anti-foreign imperialism and ordered armed resistance. Son Byeong-hui and his, who gathered in Boeun from the Bukjeop and Namjeop regions, cooperated to attack Gongju, which was a strategic location for the Chungcheong region and a route to Hanyang.

Before the attack on Gongju, Jeon Bong-jun, in his capacity as the leader of the "Yangho Changui Gunyeongsu" (the leaders of the Jeolla Province and Chungcheong Province uprisings), sent a letter to Park Je-sun, the governor of Chungcheong Province, urging him to avoid internal conflicts and strengthen the anti-Japanese front by encouraging the participation of the government army. As the peasant army pressured Gongju, Park Je-sun urgently requested reinforcements from both the government army and the Japanese army.

== Order of Battle ==
Gongju, which was a strategic point in Chungcheong Province, was surrounded by mountains on three sides and had excellent geographical conditions with the Geumgang River flowing to the north. At that time, Suzuki Akira, a Japanese officer, also emphasized the strategic importance by saying, "If Gongju is handed over to the Donghak followers, the Donghak army from all directions will quickly rise in revolt, leading to an uncontrollable situation."

=== Allied Forces ===
The Korean government decided to suppress the peasant army by cooperating with the Japanese forces. Inside the Fortress of Gongju were perhaps 3,000 governmental forces led by Gu Sangjo, Seong Hayeong, Jang Yongjin, and Yi Gidong, and some 400 Japanese soldiers led by Colonel Moriya. On September 21, 810 troops from the Unified Defense Guard and the Strong Defense Guard established the Yanghodo Inspector-General's Division (Yanghodosunmuyeong, (양호도순무영(兩湖都巡撫營)) as the main force and appointed Shin Jeong-hui as the commander. Behind him was Gu Seungjo and Seong Ha-yeong leading the elite forces of the Joseon government, including the military forces of the Logistical Support Guard (Gyeongricheong) led by Strong Defense Commanders (Gyeongricheong Yeonggwan (경리청영관 (經理廳領官)) Seong Ha-yeong (成夏泳) and Hong Un-seop, the Left Vanguard Army of the Unified Defense Guard (좌선봉진군(左先鋒陳軍), 통위영군)) led by Yi Gyu-tae (通威營軍), the Integrated Defense Unit (Pyeongwiyeong), the Military Training Division, and the camp troops commanded by Uyeongjang Yi Gi-dong. Also participating in the battle was the Garrison Army (Kamyeonggun (감영군 (監營軍)) commanded by the Seosan City Official (Seosan Busa, (서산부사 (瑞山府使)) Park Je-sun.

Meanwhile, Japan deployed 120 troops of the 2nd Company (consisting of one company and two platoons) from the 18th Regiment equipped with modern weapons and tactics. They were stationed in Hanyang to Jeolla Province, while dispatching forces primarily centered around the 19th Regiment to the regions where the peasant army had risen, securing command of the Korean army from the Korean government. The peasant army faced attacks from the Japanese forces and the government forces under Japanese command.

=== Donghak Peasant Army ===
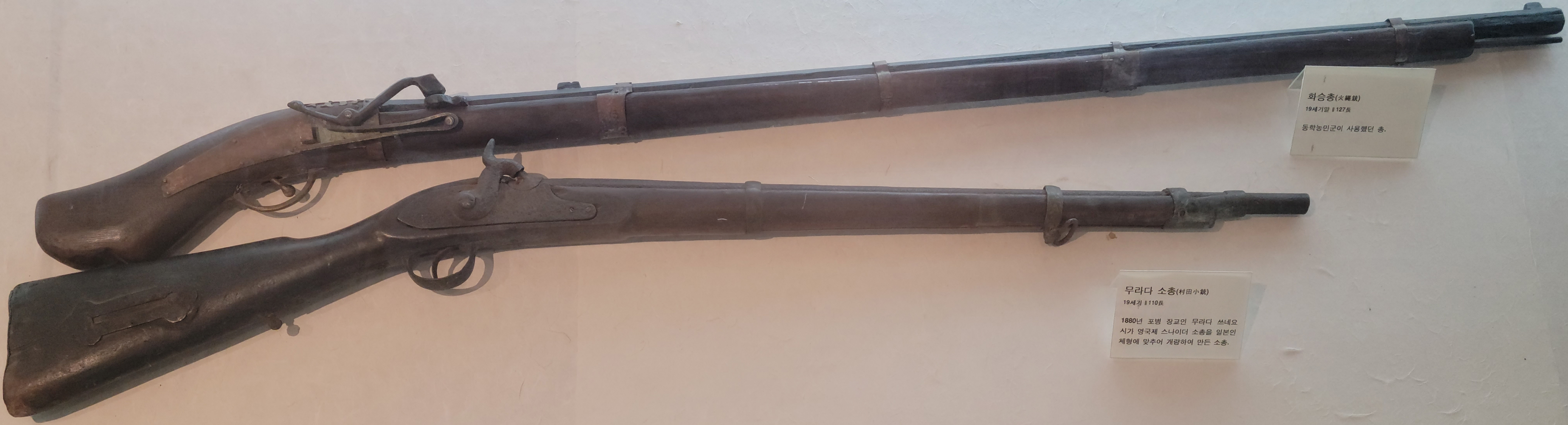
Matchlock and Murata firearms used during the battle.

The peasant army of 40,000 that gathered in Samrye (southern faction) began its northward march around October 12, when the harvest was almost completed, and arrived in Nonsan. There, they recruited additional peasant army members and also joined forces with the peasant army (northern faction) in the northeastern region of Chungcheong Province, led by Son Byeong-hui, between October 12 and 16. In addition, numerous local leaders under Choi Si-hyeong's command raised revolts in various regions of Chungcheong Province and Gyeongsang Province and gathered in Nonsan. According to Jeon Bong-jun's statement, the peasant army that participated in the Gongju battle, including the Ugeumchi Battle, consisted of over 10,000 people from Jeolla Province, Chungcheong Province, Gyeongsang Province, and other regions, consisting of both the southern and northern factions. Jeon Bong-jun's direct unit based in Jeolla Province had a strength of about 4,000 people. The remaining 6,000 people were peasant armies that joined forces with Jeon Bong-jun and marched north to Gongju from places such as Ganggyeong in Chungcheong Province, Nonsan, Eunjin, and Noseong. In other words, the peasant army of the Second Uprising had the character of a combined force of Jeolla Province and Chungcheong Province. About 40 to 50 Qing troops also participated in the battle.

== Initial attacks ==
When Jeon Bong-jun ordered a general offensive on Gongju on October 20, the peasant army launched defensive battles against government and Japanese forces on October 23 in Iin, October 24 in Daegyo, and October 25 in Hyopo and Neungchi. However, the peasant army was unable to overcome the superior firepower and unfavorable conditions of the government and Japanese forces and had to retreat temporarily. In response, Jeon Bong-jun, with the support of Kim Gae-nam's troops, regrouped and engaged in battles with government and Japanese forces in Ugeumchi, Gongju, on November 8 and 9.

=== Attack on Yiyin ===
The Donghak Peasant Army devised a plan to launch a coordinated attack on Gongju from the Buyeo and Nonsan directions. On October 23, a rebel battalion began their attack from the Yiyin region. This battle unfolded over three days in locations such as Hyopo (孝浦), Panchi (板峙), and Ungchi (熊峙) which was about 10 li (about 4 kilometers) away. They clashed in a chaotic battle. The suppressing forces against the peasant army numbered about 930, which was about one-tenth of the peasant army's strength. Although the peasant army had the disadvantage in terms of weapons and tactics, they initially fought bravely and breached Gongju's defense took Yiyin and up to Hyopyo. However, on October 24, another Japanese reinforcement unit arrived, and the tide of the battle immediately turned against the peasant army. On October 25, Jeon Bong-jun (전봉준) ordered a retreat of the peasant army to regroup and prepare for the next battle.

=== Battle of Ung Pass ===
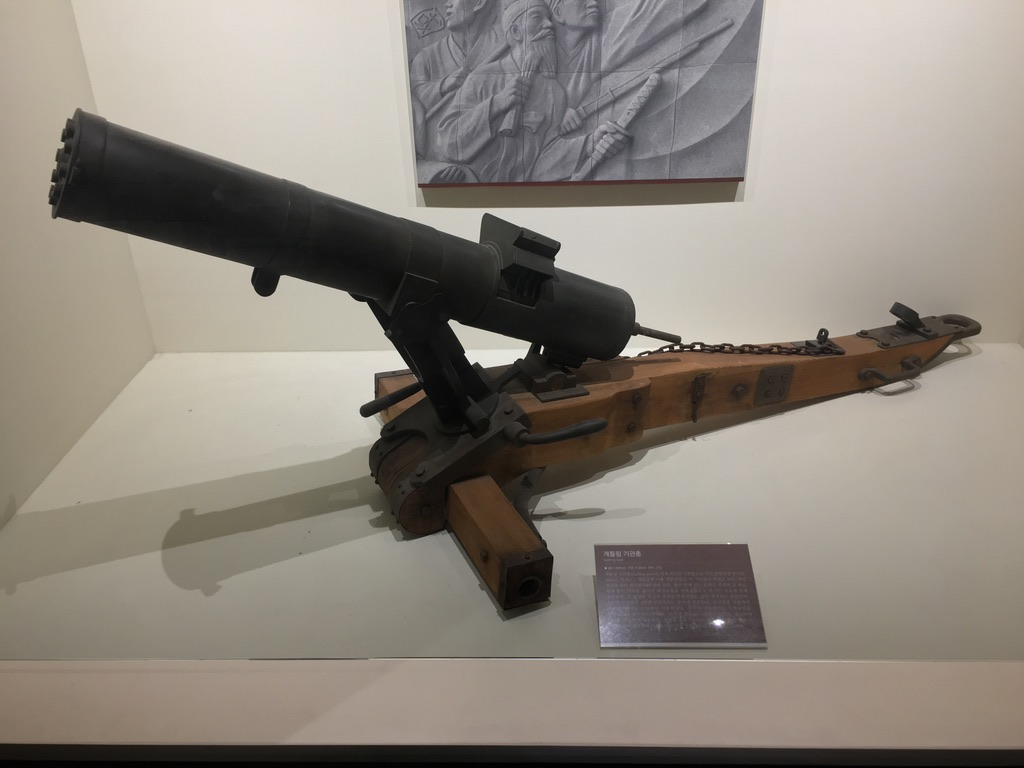
A gatling gun used during the battle.

On the 24th and 25th, fierce battles took place between rebel and a coalition army of Japanese soldiers, governmental forces, and anti-rebel guerrillas with the reinforcements of the government forces and about 100 soldiers from a Japanese battalion in Ung Pass, or Ungchi. Ungchi was a pass located behind Hyopo that led straight to Gongju, and a crucial location for the rebels. However, the Donghak Peasant Army, armed with mostly bows and arrows, spears, swords and matchlocks couldn't withstand the well-trained and superior firepower of the government forces and Japanese troops armed with Murata rifles and gatling guns, the Northern Jeob experienced severe casualties in Ungchi, because they lacked proper training in war and they were defeated. They retreated south to Noseong and Nonsan Chopo, reorganized their formation, and planned to attack Gongju by designating the main attack route as the road leading to Seoul through Iin and Ugeumchi, while using several other routes including Woongchi as auxiliary attack routes.

== Battle ==
=== November 8th ===
On November 8, when the peasant army launched a fierce attack on Yiyin and Mune against the suppressing forces divided into three divisions, the government forces were driven back and retreated to Gongju Kamnyeong. Jeon placed his army so that the rebels stretched sixteen kilometers, from Panchi to Mount Bonghwang. Jeon was at the center of this line, surrounded by flags and riding on his white horse. The government forces defended the sides (Hyopyo, Ungchi, Mount Bonghwang), while the Japanese were stationed in Ugeumchi proper. At 10:00 am, the rebels charged at Ugeumchi. He sent two battalions of the Donghak Peasant Army advanced from Gyeongcheon to the southeast of Gongju Castle, and another detachment began pressuring the government forces, stationed in Iin, from the southwest to lure them away so that the major rebel forces would not meet a large governmental army in Ugeumchi. Finally, around 3 p.m., the first division crossed Panji and attacked Yiyin and Hyopo, diverting the attention of the government forces in that direction. At the same time, the second division, consisting of about 10,000 soldiers, advanced towards the government forces stationed in Iin. The other 30,000 rebels were crossing Ugeumchi. However, they encountered a Japanese battalion of 280 soldiers. The Japanese gathered the Korean forces into Ugeumchi. Japanese Lieutenant Moriya, who was in overall command, repelled the attack with about 280 Kyungricheong soldiers and defended Ugeumchi with a Japanese battalion. Throughout the night, both sides fiercely confronted each other, lighting fires and firing guns and cannons. As the day broke, they entered into a decisive battle.

=== November 9th ===
On the morning of November 9, the deployment of both sides revealed that the Donghak Peasant Army had advanced from Panji in the east to Bonghwangsan in the west, spanning about 40 to 50 li (about 16 to 20 kilometers). Especially, the main forces had advanced to a mountain located 500 meters ahead of Ugeumchi. The Pyeongwiyeong and Gamyeongbyeong were responsible for the frontal and right defenses, including Geumhakdong, Woongchi, Hyopo, and Bonghwangsan. The Japanese troops, centered around some Kyungricheong soldiers and the disbanded 19th Regiment, were scattered and deployed at Ugeumchi and Gyunjunsan. The peasant army surrounded Gongju from three sides (Hyopo, Ungchi, and Ugeumchi) and launched an offensive toward Ugeumchi, the key point of entry into Gongju. At that time, the government forces led by Yi Gyu-tae and Yi Du-hwang were stationed on the east and west sides of Ugeumchi, and the Japanese forces were stationed at the highest peak of Ugeumchi. In addition, troops trained by the Japanese, including Yi Jin-ho (1867–1943) leading the Military Training Division and Seong Ha-yeong leading the Military Administration Bureau, were deployed along the defense line. Riding the momentum of victory, the peasant army launched a full-scale attack towards the suppressing forces' positions in Ugeumchi. The suppressing forces occupied advantageous high points in terrain, including Gyunjunbong (犬蹲峰), and waited for the peasant army. The peasant army was in a disadvantageous position, as they had to attack from lower ground towards the mountaintop. The suppressing forces, positioned between Ugeumchi and Gyunjunbong, used the small ridges as shields to observe the peasant army from above. They opened fire when the peasant army approached and concealed themselves, and repeated this pattern when the peasant army advanced through the narrow ridges in the valley of Ugeumchi. However, despite the constant one-sided shooting and witnessing the peasant army continuously "waving flags, beating drums, and bravely climbing up, facing death," the officials' recording of the unyielding spirit of the peasant army expressed their bone-chilling and cool-hearted thoughts on their actions.

At 10 a.m., the Donghak Peasant Army began its attack towards Ugeumchi, and at the same time, the other division of about 10,000 soldiers, who had faced Samhwasan, advanced towards the rear mountain of Osil. In the battle, which took on the characteristics of a highland battle, the Donghak Peasant Army, charging with spears and various firearms, attacked the government forces and Japanese troops, who defended from advantageous positions. However, the Donghak Peasant Army, despite suffering heavy casualties, continued the attack without yielding. This defense battle continued until the afternoon, but the Donghak Peasant Army, unable to break through the aggressive defense of the government forces, could not avoid retreating.

According to the records of the government forces, the peasant army attempted to break through Ugeumchi over 40 to 50 times but could not overcome the unfavorable terrain and the superior firepower of the government and Japanese forces, resulting in numerous casualties and a retreat. Because of their weak weapons, they were unable to cross Ugeumchi. The Japanese used cannons and rifles, and had proper military training. Although small groups of rebels crossed the 'death line' more than forty times, they were all shot down. Meanwhile, a portion of the peasant army attempted to bypass the Ugeumchi Valley and occupy Duri Peak to advance toward Gongju, but as the main force was defeated at Ugeumchi and the government and Japanese forces blocked their retreat route, this operation also failed. In the end, the peasant army had to retreat towards Nonsan, suffering a defeat in the Battle of Ugeumchi. Jeon Bong-jun sent a letter to the government forces during the retreat, appealing for Koreans to fight together against the Japanese, but it had no effect. As a result, the peasant army's advance towards Seoul was thwarted, and the Donghak Peasant Revolution ended in failure.

==== Battle of Hyopyo ====
Meanwhile, in Hyopyo, the 10,000 rebels took advantage of the government army's negligence in defense and attacked the mountain peak all day long. They captured various peaks, but whenever the governmental forces seemed to break, they were instantly reinforced by the Japanese. The battle was expressed by a spectator of the battle:

And we finally destroyed the thieving raiders... It was as if the stars themselves were falling from the sky, and the autumn leaves were being scattered on the lands.

The Donghak Peasant Army, which was unable to break through the strong defenses of the government and Japanese troops despite making great sacrifices, ended up completely retreating toward Noseong and Nonsan on the afternoon of the 11th, and Jeon Bong-jun advised the Koreans not to fight among themselves and keep up the fight. In addition, thousands of Donghak peasant troops stationed in Hyopo also lost morale and were ambushed by about 10 disguised government soldiers and retreated toward Gyeryongsan Mountain. The Donghak Peasant Army, which attempted to occupy Gongju and then move north to Seoul, was thwarted in Ugeumchi.

== Aftermath ==
The mountains were filled with piles of bodies of the peasant army. According to oral testimonies recorded in the early 2000s at Ugeumchi, Satsatjae, and Seungjugal, which were the battlefields between the peasant army and the suppressing forces, the dead were so numerous that they were simply covered with soil, and the entire area became a graveyard. It is said that local residents were mobilized to remove the bodies of the peasant army over a three-year period.

As a result of this battle, the Donghak Peasant Army, after one charge at the Japanese, only 10,000 of the original 40,000 rebels were left. After the following charge, there were 3,000 rebels left. After another engagement, it was further reduced to about 1,500 soldiers. When the rebels finally retreated on 10 November, only 500 rebels out of an army of 40,000 remained, and the main unit of the peasant army, led by Jeon Bong-jun, rapidly declined in strength after the Battle of Ugeumchi. The Korean government forces and Japanese troops successfully defended their positions and repelled the Donghak Peasant Army's attacks. The battle at Ugeumchi in Gongju marked a significant setback for the Donghak Peasant Revolution. The peasant army disintegrated without being able to form a unified front, and subsequent regional resistance movements occurred sporadically at a diminishing level. However, the government army, which was outnumbered, did not dare to pursue them any further and only observed the situation.

Jeon led the 500 remainder south into Taein, the rebel center. There, he gathered an army of 8,000 rebels. On 25 November, the Japanese caught up with the rebels, camped in Mount Gumi. Despite rebel strategic superiority, the Japanese firepower annihilated both the rebels and the city of Taein. A historian, Park Eunsik, recorded that there was "nothing left in Taein for 40 kilometers". 40 civilian houses, along with perhaps 400 rebels, were killed. After the Battle of Taein, on 28 November 1894, Jeon formally dissolved the Donghak Army and ordered the Donghak peasants to scatter. The rebels cried: "We thought Jeon Nokdu (Jeon's nickname) would save us, but now we are all going to die". Jeon answered: "War is a game of luck. Why is it that you blame me". He then dressed up as a peasant and headed east. Jeon himself was hanged in March, 1895.

== See also ==
- Donghak Peasant Revolution
- First Sino-Japanese War
- Jeon Bong-jun
- Son Byeong-hui
- Japanese occupation of Gyeongbokgung Palace
- Retreat from Gonju
