= Choe Si-hyeong =

Korean revolutionary (1827–1898)

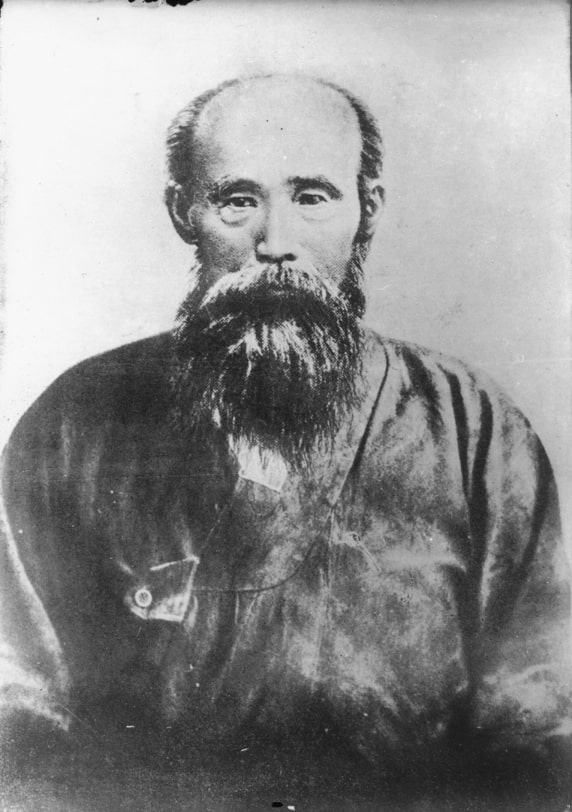
- Born: 1827; Gyeongju, North Gyeongsang Province, Joseon
- Died: 1898 (aged 70–71); Seoul, Joseon

Korean name
- Hangul: 최시형
- Hanja: 崔時亨
- RR: Choe Sihyeong
- MR: Ch'oe Sihyŏng

Art name
- Hangul: 해월
- Hanja: 海月
- RR: Haewol
- MR: Haewŏl

Choe Si-hyeong (Korean: 최시형; 1827–1898), birth name Choe Gyeong-sang, was born in Gyeongju. His posthumous name was Si-hyeong and his honorific title was Hae-wol (해월), and he is referred to hereafter by that name. He was the second leader of Donghak during the Joseon and Korean Empire eras. He succeeded Choe Je-u (pen name, Su-un) after the latter's execution by Joseon authorities in 1864.

After Su-un’s execution, Haewol was pursued by government authorities for 36 years. During this period, he compiled and printed the works of Su-un; and he wrote his own doctrinal works. In the early 1890s, he helped to petition the government to exonerate Su-un. This ultimately led to armed confrontations, primarily in Jeolla province, in what is referred to as the Donghak Peasant Revolution of 1894, even though Donghak followers were in the minority among the rebels. Haewol initially opposed the revolt but eventually went along with it, perhaps because it seemed inevitable. The rebellion, led primarily by Jeon Bongjun, was suppressed later that year.

In the aftermath of the revolt, Donghak was decimated. Haewol, attempted to restore it with some success, primarily in other parts of Korea but was captured by government forces in 1898 and executed. He was succeeded by Son Byong-Hi (Uiam, 1861–1922) who became the third leader of Donghak.

== Biography ==
=== Before the 1894 rebellion ===
Haewol had an underprivileged childhood. He was born in Gyengju in Gyeongsang Province in 1827. His mother died when he was six years old and he was brought up by his stepmother. His father died when he was 15. He and his sister were economically stressed and worked as farmhands. He worked in a paper mill in his late teens and then engaged in slash and burn farming. He met Su-un, the founder of Donghak, in 1861 and became an ardent participant in ritual chanting, fasting and doing penance. He came to hear mystical voices which he concluded came from Su-un rather than heaven. Through his practice he came to realize that “the mundane world can be sacred if Hanul (Heaven) is immanent in this world”.

By some accounts, Su-un chose him to be the next leader a few months before his execution. However there is some debate about this stemming from divergent accounts of Donghak history. Furthermore, his name is not mentioned in Su-un’s writings or in interrogation records from 1860 to 1863. In any event, he did emerge as the second leader of Donghak at least by the mid-1860s. After Su-un’s death it is likely that Haewol traveled around southern Korea, teaching and proselytizing, while remaining hidden from authorities. It appears that he spent most of his time in the northern interior and coastal regions of Gyeongsang Province. One of Haewol’s major accomplishments was the compilation of Su-un’s writings which became Donghak scripture. After Su-un’s death most of these writings were lost but Haewol had committed them to memory and was able to restore them and have them printed using carved wooden blocks. The process was initiated in 1965 but not completed until the early 1980s due to government persecution. The project was done with the aid of several other prominent Donghak leaders. The compilations reordered Su-un’s writings and separated his vernacular Korean and classical Chinese texts in two separate books.

In 1870, a Donghak splinter group led by Yi P’il-che, was involved in a rebellion, although most of the rebels were not Donghak followers. The main motivation of the rebellion was dissatisfaction with government policies, and it was quickly put down by government forces. Haewol had met Yi and subsequently declared that he was a deceiver. Although Haewol had opposed Yi, he was forced to flee to Mount Taebaek and Mount Sobaek in Gangweondo Gyeongsangdo, and Chungcheongdo to avoid arrest in the aftermath of the rebellion.

In the late 1870s and early 1880s, government suppression of Donghak began to ease as government shifted its focus to other concerns such as foreign intervention. In addition, Donghak activities were primarily in remote areas, distant from government scrutiny. This enabled Haewol to begin to restore the Donghak organizational structure. This was similar to that which he helped Su-un implement. There was a central headquarters which Haewol administered. This guided district and local headquarters called p’o and jeop, respectively. Each was staffed by individuals with specific responsibilities including chief inspector, teacher, chief administrator, judge, counselor, and censor. In addition to compiling Su-un’s works he also wrote his own doctrinal works. In these, he extended Su-un’s concept of the eminence of the Divine in declarations such as “heaven and earth are parents”, “people are heaven and heaven is people” and “treat others as if they were heaven”. He considered that God/Heaven was eminent not only in people but in all creation including other creatures and inanimate objects. He advocated the three respects, i.e., respect for heaven, people and nature.

=== Petitions and 1894 rebellion ===
By the early 1890s, the number of Donghak followers had increased particularly in Chunqcheonq and Jeolla provinces, where they had become more assertive. Leaders from those provinces came to Haewol and asked him to petition the government to exonerate Su-un. He complied, first sending petitions to the governors of those provinces. When those petitions were rejected, petitions were sent to the central government. When those petitions failed it was determined that the King should be petitioned directly. On the occasion of a special civil service examination, approximately 40 followers disguised themselves as scholars who were there to take the examination. They staged a demonstration outside the gate of the royal palace in which they requested the exoneration of Su-un and also relief from local corruption. The king agreed to honor their request if they returned home. However, the commitment was not implemented. The movement wound down as Donghak leaders around Haewol were worried about violence.

Thereafter, the movement became militaristic, and the primary grievance shifted from clearing Su-un’s name to redress of local corruption. An army was assembled under the leadership of Jeon Bongjun. Donghak followers made up a minority of the army, but its leaders were affiliated with Donghak or claimed to be Donghak followers. Those that joined the rebellion were primarily in the southern assembly. In order to mobilize his army, Jeon utilized the Donghak organizational structure where it existed and organized new units (p’o) where needed. The p'o under his control were reorganized as local military control units.

Haewol ordered Jeon not to defy the “will of heaven”, but this command was disregarded. At that point, there was scant participation by members of the northern assembly. The first stage of the “Donghak” rebellion in the spring of 1894 was initially successful. A number of district capitals were captured along with Jeonju. the walled provincial capital of Jeolla province. At the end of the spring stage of the rebellion, there was an agreement between rebel and government forces; the rebels withdrew from Jeonju on May 8; and some of their demands were met at their own initiation. These included freeing of slaves and establishment of local administrative units, Jipgangso (Chipkangso), whose members were elected. The main purpose of the Jipgangso was to guarantee peasant rights and reform government abuses.

However, the truce was uneasy from the start. Government forces continued to suppress Donghak; and on the other side, rebel forces did not disband as had been agreed. Also, by that time the Korean government had requested help from Qing dynasty China which sent troops. Japan used this as a pretext to send their own army. Japanese forces seized the king and the capital on July 23. This led to the installment of a pro-Japan government and an order expelling Chinese troops from Korea. This initiated the First Sino-Japanese War. Jeon and the Korean public in general were incensed. Thereupon Jeon started the second, autumn stage of the uprising, this time to drive out the Japanese.

Haewol objected to resumption of the rebellion as was made clear in an official declaration in which he stated that the southern assembly rebels were traitors to the state and in violation of Donghak doctrine. Seungyop Shin concluded that "Haewol believed that everyone should undergo a comprehensive sacred transformation through the pious pursuit of virtue and a pure state of mind, while Jeon considered it imperative to rescue his people through the more expedient means of violent insurrection." Nevertheless, on October 16, following mediation efforts by other leaders, he eventually agreed to allow his followers to join the rebels. But he also instructed Donghak members to try to persuade Jeon to cease the riot.

The southern assembly forces had some initial success and were able to link with rebels from the northern assembly on October 16. However, the combined force suffered disastrous defeats at Ugeumchi in early November. After which, the Japanese army (with the help of Korean forces) put down the rebellion using far superior weaponry. Jeon dispersed his rebel army on November 28 and was subsequently captured and executed. Donghak followers, particularly in the southern assembly were decimated. The northern assembly was less affected and Haewol managed to escape.

=== After the 1894 rebellion ===
Following the rebel defeat, there was a strong effort by government forces to capture Donghak leaders. Haewol took refuge in the mountains of Gangweon and Chungcheong where he had hidden back in the 1880s. In early1896, he began to transfer leadership to a new generation. He held a series of meetings with his most trusted followers Son Byong-Hi, Gim Yeon-guk (Kim Yŏn-guk), and Son Cheon-min (Son Ch'ŏn-min) and gave them the religious names of Uiam, Kuam, and Songam, respectively. They were given the group title of Samam (the three “am”, referring to the last character of their religious names) and they were charged with administering Donghak under Haewols direction. This was to be a collective leadership acting with “one heart and mind”. Sources differ concerning succession plans. There was a schism after Haewol’s death. Son Byong-Hi’s branch claimed that he was to become the next leader. Another branch claimed that Kim Yon-guk would be the leader. The former is the dominant branch today. The main motivation for Song’s claim was that he and Haewol gave the exact same sermon at two different locations in the spring of 1897 proving that they had the same mind.

In 1897, Haewol was frail, and he narrowly escaped capture in an ox cart traveling over snow covered mountains. In May 1898, he had a memorial service for Su-un with the Samam and other prominent disciples. After the meeting he told them to go home. He was arrested the following day. He was then taken to Seoul and executed on July 20, 1898.

== Legacy ==
Haewol’s successor, Uiam modernized Donghak according to western standards and renamed it Cheondogyo in 1905. Haewol’s restoration of Su-un’s writings and his own writings have been canonized by Cheondogyo. His work was compiled in a book called Master Haewŏl’s Discussion on the Teachings.

Jang Il-soon, Korean theologian and advocate for the life movement (Korean nature centered environmentalism) and formal democratization of Korea, was inspired by Haewol. According to Baek: "As Haewol encouraged his followers to cultivate their minds and to focus on their ordinary life for survival, Jang Il-soon concentrated on the change of the ordinary life of the individual and community in order to reform and overcome the reality [the oppression during the dictatorial period following the Korean war]. Their failures made them doubtful about rebellious movement that was based on conventional worldview and ideology. Thus, in their view, the essence of resistance is not ethics or moral ideas but praxis based on ordinary life.”

== In popular culture ==
- Choe is portrayed by actor Lee Deok-hwa in the 1991 South Korean biographical film Fly High Run Far.
- Choe appears in the 2019 South Korean television series Nokdu Flower

== See also ==
- Donghak
- Cheondogyo
