= Baekbaekgyo =

1899 Korean new religious movement

Baekbaekgyo (Korean: 백백교) was a Korean new religious movement founded by Woo Kwang Hyun. It is associated with a murder incident in the 1930s, during the Japanese colonial period.

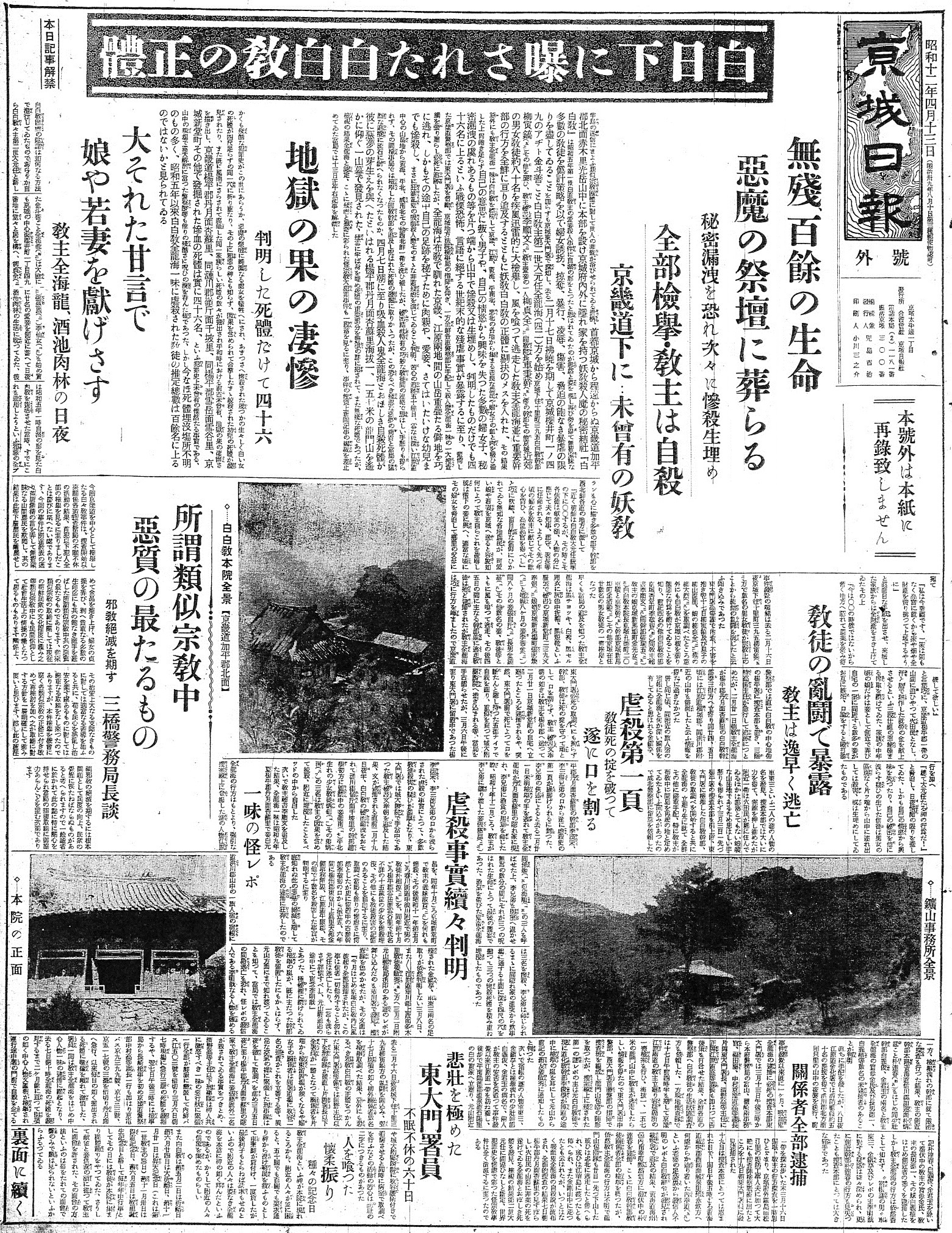
The report of the murder incident in 1937 on the newspaper Keijō Nippō.

== History ==
The movement first started as an offshoot of the religion Baekdokyo (백도교; 白道敎), itself an offshoot of Cheondoism. Baekdokyo was founded in 1899, with its official organization in 1912 and was led by leader Jeon Jeong-ye, an individual who claimed to have received a revelation on Mount Kumgang. Baekdogyo, despite its proselytization projects, was mostly run as a secret organization. It amassed 10,000 followers. After Jeon died in 1919, his second son Jeon Yong-hae and a high priest of the religion at the time named Wookwang Hyun secretly buried a body without telling the believers of the religion. A police investigation regarding the religion surrounding the case of victims of the religion led to the reveal of the secret burial, and Baekdogyo began to decline, and Leehuiryong, another high-level leader of the religion, decided to make a branch called Incheondo (人天道) in 1923. This led to Woo taking the remaining sect of the Baekdogyo and relaunching the religion as Baekbaekgyo in 1923.

== Beliefs and practices ==
The movement believed in an apocalyptic theology and that chanting the mantras of Baekbaekbaekuiuiuijeokjeokjeokgameunggamgameunghasiopsungseong (백백백의의의적적적감응감감응하시옵숭성; 白白白衣衣衣赤赤赤感應感感應하시옵崇誠) would lead to a long, healthy life. The movement requested its believers to dedicate their wealth to the religion, and send their daughters as servants for the founder.

== Murder incident and decline ==
Through a police investigation 800 remains of dead people were found in Kangwon and Gyeonggi province in 1937, which were people who were murdered when they tried to go against the commands of the religious founder. All of the high staff of the religion were prosecuted for murder.

== In popular culture ==
The religion has been featured in two films, one in 1961 and one in 1992.
