= Yongdamjeong =

South Korean religious site

Coordinates: 35°53′24″N 129°08′40″E

- Hangul: 용담정
- Hanja: 龍潭亭
- RR: Yongdamjeong
- MR: Yongdamjŏng

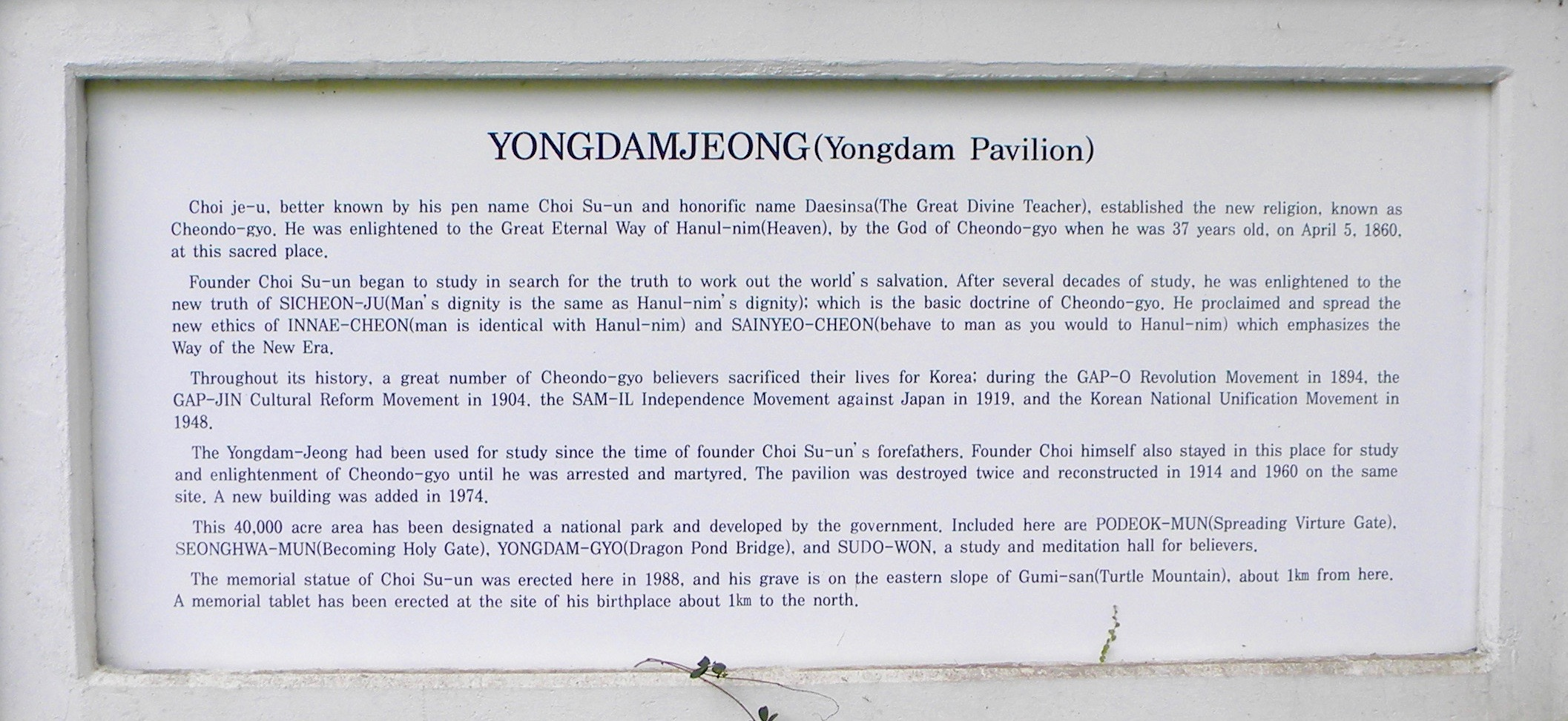
Yongdamjeong Temple Description

Yongdamjeong (lit. Dragon Pool Pavilion) is a sacred place to Cheondoism, located on Mt. Gumi in Gajeong-ri, Hyeongok-myeon, Gyeongju, South Korea.

== Religious significance ==
Cheondoism is an indigenous Korean religion that evolved from Donghak (Eastern learning). Choe Je-u, the founder of Donghak, was born and later buried at Yongdamjeong. There is a statue in his image near the pavilion.

== See also ==
- Donghak
- Choe Je-u
