= Ch'oe Cheu =

Founder of Donghak (1824–1864)

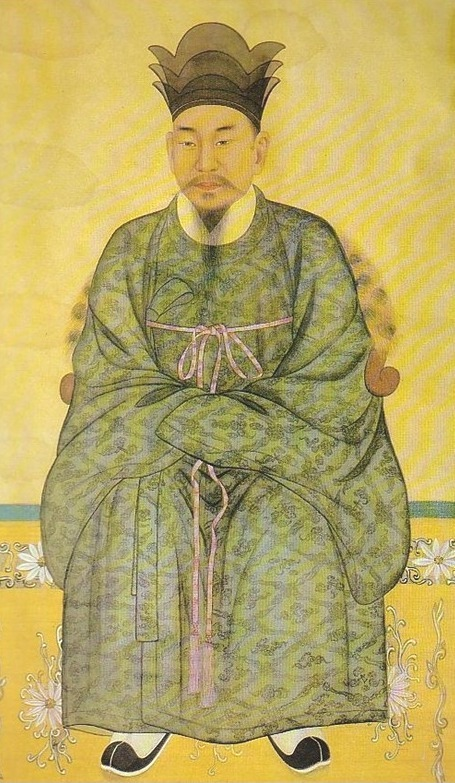
- Portrait of Ch'oe Cheu

Korean name
- Hangul: 최제우
- Hanja: 崔濟愚
- RR: Choe Jeu
- MR: Ch'oe Cheu

Art name
- Hangul: 수운
- Hanja: 水雲
- RR: Suun
- MR: Suun

Ch'oe Cheu (Korean: 최제우; Hanja: 崔濟愚; 18 December 1824 – 15 April 1864), art name Suun (수운; 水雲), was a Korean religious leader. He was the founder of Donghak, a religious movement which was empathetic to the hardships of the minjung (the marginalized people of Korea), opposed Catholicism and its association with Western imperialism, and offered an alternative to orthodox Neo-Confucianism.

He combined Korean shamanism, Daoism, Buddhism and spiritual Neo-Confucianism in an "original school of thought" that valued rebellion and anti-government thought until 1864. He did not have a concrete nationalistic or anti-feudal agenda, rather: "His vision was religious, and his mission was to remind his countrymen that strength lay in reviving traditional values." Nevertheless, Joseon authorities confused his teachings with Catholicism, and he was executed in 1864 for allegedly preaching heretical and dangerous teachings.

His birth-name was Ch'oe Chesŏn ("save and proclaim"). During his childhood, he was also called Bok-sul ("blissfully happy"). He took the name Cheu ("saviour of the ignorant") in 1859. His disciples called him Suun ("water cloud"), which was the name he used for his writings, and also called him Daesinsa, the great teacher. His pen name Suun is used hereafter.

== Biography ==
Suun was born into an aristocratic (yangban) family on 18 December 1824 (the 28th day of the 10th month) at Kajong-ni, a village near Gyeongju, the ex-capital of Silla and now a city in the south-eastern province of Gyeongsang Province.

Silla, which was the first unified dynasty on the peninsula, had a strong scholarly and Buddhist tradition. One of his ancestors was a famous scholar who had served at the court of the Tang emperor in China and had returned to Silla. One of his contemporaries called him the "Confucius of Korea". In addition, he was considered the founder of Daoism on the peninsula.

His father, Ch'oe Ok, was a scholar who had failed to obtain a government post, his clan not being in favor with those then in power. He had reached the age of sixty and had been married and widowed twice without gaining a son. He adopted a nephew to preserve his own line before marrying a widow named Han. Suun was the result of this final union, but he was considered illegitimate in the Neo-Confucian system: the children of a widow who had remarried occupied a low position in the social hierarchy and could not, for example, take the civil examinations necessary to become a bureaucrat. Despite this he received a good education. However, Ch'oe Ok certainly provided his son with a strong education in Neo-Confucianism and perhaps other doctrinal traditions such as Daoism.

His mother died when he was six years old, and his father when he was sixteen. He married in his teens to Madam Park of Ulsan. He led an itinerant life before finally settling with his family in Ulsan in 1854. Although educated in Confucianism, he partook of Buddhist practices, rituals, and beliefs, including interacting with monks, visiting temples, and abstaining from meat. In 1856, he began a 49-day retreat in the Buddhist monastery of Naewon-sa, but had to leave on the 47th day to attend the funeral of his uncle. The next year, he managed to complete the 49 days at Cheok-myeol Caves, but did not find the experience spiritually fulfilling.

In 1858, he lost his house and all effects in bankruptcy, and he returned with his family to the paternal household in 1859. While there, he spent his time in prayer and meditation. The discrimination and economic hardships he faced seemed to serve as stimulation for his "revolutionary" ideas. He later wrote that he lamented the "sickness in society since the age of ten, so much so that he felt that he was living in a "dark age". Suun felt he was called to address the root cause of the "dark age" which he considered to be inner spiritual depletion and social corruption. He considered that the enormous Western imperial power stemmed from a combination of military and spiritual power. It seemed that Korean spiritual traditions, particularly Confucianism, had lost their power. In fact, Confucianism was a tool of the upper classes to maintain the status quo.

According to his own account, he was greatly concerned by the public disorder in Korea, the encroachments of Christianity, and the domination of East Asia by Western powers, which seemed to indicate that divine favor had passed into the hands of foreigners:

A strange rumour spread through the land that Westerners had discovered the truth and that there was nothing that they could not do. Nothing could stand before their military power. Even China was being destroyed. Will our country too suffer the same fate? Their Way is called Western Learning, the religion of Cheonju, their doctrine, the Holy Teaching. Is it possible that they know the Heavenly Order and have received the Heavenly Mandate?

=== Religious activities ===
On 25 May 1860 (the 5th day of the 4th month, lunar calendar), he experienced his first revelation, the kaepyeok, at his father's Yongdam Pavilion on Mount Gumi, several kilometres northwest of Gyeongju: a direct encounter with Sangje ("Lord of Heaven"). During the encounter, Suun received two gifts, a talisman (the yŏngbu) and an incantation (the chumun). The talisman was a symbol drawn on paper, burned, mixed with water, and ingested. The incantation was to be chanted repeatedly. In following these rituals, physical and spiritual health could be restored. According to Beirne, the meditative drawing and consumption of the yŏngbu was "a visible sign and celebration of the intimate union between the Lord of Heaven and the practitioner, the effect of which invigorates both body and spirit."

The use of the incantation ritual matured over time. Initially, the emphasis was on restoration of physical health. A later variant of the incantation put more emphasis on spiritual enlightenment. With respect to spiritual enlightenment, the purpose of reciting the incantation was to bring about the presence of the Lord of Heaven on each occasion within the believer or to effect an awareness of the indwelling of the Lord of Heaven through practice, repetition and refinement of the spirit. Both of these interpretations seem to be implied in his writings.

Suun was instructed by God to spread his teaching to humankind. He threw himself into three years of proselytising. His initial writings were in vernacular Korean and were intended for his family. They were composed as poems or songs in a four-beat gasa style, which lends itself to memorization. After a year of meditation, he wrote essays in classical Chinese expounding on his ideas. However, he continued to write in vernacular Korean, which increased his popularity among commoners and women who could not read Chinese. He called his doctrine Donghak ("eastern learning") to distinguish it from the Seohak ("western learning") of the Catholics. Eastern Learning can be understood as "Korean Learning". This follows from the fact that Joseon Korea was known as the Eastern Country because it lay east of China.

Donghak was largely a combination of Korean shamanism, Daoism, Buddhism and Neo-Confucianism. The evidence of the latter is clearly discernible only from the middle stage of Suun's thought onward, an indication of his evolving theology. However, according to So Jeong Park, Donghak is not merely a "syncretism of Asian philosophical traditions seasoned with Korean aspirations for modernization", but rather a "novel or original school of thought". On the other hand, an earlier evaluation by Susan Shin emphasized the continuity of Donghak with a spiritual branch of Neo-Confucianism exemplified by the teaching of Wang Yangming.

Suun's concept of the singular God (Cheonju/Sangje) or God/Heaven seemed to reflect that of Catholicism, though it differed in its views on transience and immanence. Also, like Catholicism, Donghak was communal and egalitarian. Orthodox Neo-Confucians in power at the time of its founding viewed Catholicism and Donghak as threats in two ways. First, if there are many gods, no single god has the power to challenge the existing Confucian order. However, a believer in an omniscient God or God/Heaven might put His demands above those of a human king. Believers would also be expected to shun other gods and thereby hold themselves apart from those with less dogmatic beliefs, thereby disrupting the harmony of the kingdom. Second, Catholicism and Donghak practiced group rituals that were beyond the control of the government; they demanded the right to practice those rituals. In other words, they introduced a concept of religious freedom new to Korea. Although Suun attempted to distinguish Donghak and Catholicism, government officials confused the two, and both were suppressed.

According to Susan Shin, He learned that he was suspected of Catholicism, and from June 1861 to March 1862, he had to take refuge in Jeolla province to avoid arrest, spending the winter in a Buddhist temple in Namwon. While there, he wrote important parts of his scripture, including Discussions of Learning, Song of Encouraging Learning, and Poem on Spiritual Training.

Estimates of the number of his followers before his arrest in 1863 ranged from hundreds to tens of thousands, and he became famous throughout the peninsula. He had established assemblies in at least twelve villages and towns. These were primarily located in the southeastern part of Joseon Korea.

Suun was arrested shortly before 10 December 1863 for allegedly preaching heretical and dangerous teachings. He was tried, found guilty on 5 April 1864, and beheaded on 15 April 1864 (the 10th day of the 3rd month) at Daegu, at the place today marked by his statue. His grave is in a park at Yugok-dong, a few kilometers north of Ulsan.

=== Assumed political agenda ===
Some Donghak scholars have assumed that it had a nationalistic agenda. However, according to Susan Shin, [Suun] did not address the problems of integrating Korea into the international order concretely. His vision was religious, and his mission was to remind his countrymen that strength lay in reviving traditional values." Donghak's goal was the protection of the people, which could be considered patriotic, but that does not imply nationalism. It was simply a network/frame of followers of Suun's religious views and rituals. Later leaders in the early 20th century did aspire to a modern Korean state primarily through education. However, these aspirations eventually led to violent confrontations with Japanese authorities.

The peasant revolts in Gyeongsang in 1862 were contemporaneous with Suun's ministry; however, a detailed analysis of the circumstances revealed that they were in response to corruption by local officials. There was no mention of religious influence, and an anti-feudalistic agenda was discounted.

On the other hand, Joseon Korean authorities did misconstrue Donghak's intentions. A government statement warned: "This thing called Donghak inherited all the methods of Western Learning, whereas it only changed its name to confuse and incite ignorant ears. If it is not punished and settled in its infancy according to the laws of the country, then how do we know that it will not gradually turn into another Yellow Turban or White Lotus?" The Taiping Rebellion in China was also in progress as Donghak was founded, and by coincidence, its leader Hong Xiuquan died on June 1, 1864, shortly after Suun.

=== Legacy ===
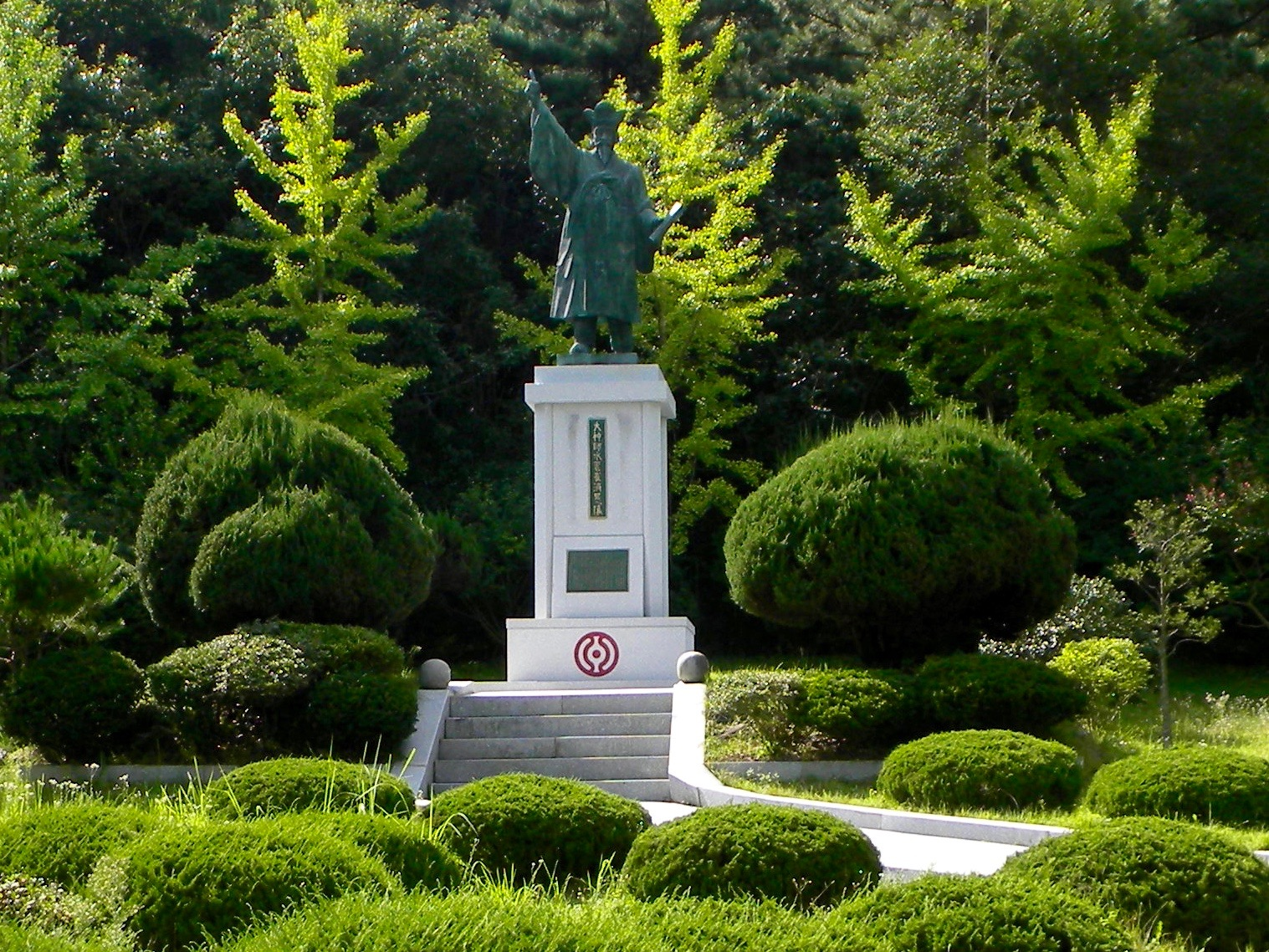
Statue of Ch'oe Cheu

After his death, the movement was continued by Choe Sihyeong (Haewol, 1827–1898). The works of Suun were collected in two volumes, The Bible of the Donghak Doctrine (in Korean-Chinese, 1880) and The Hymns of Dragon Lake (in Korean, 1881).

In 1894, the brutally suppressed Donghak Peasant Revolution, led by Jeon Bongjun (1854–1895), set the stage for the First Sino-Japanese War, which placed Korea under Japanese control. Haewol evaded capture for four years but was finally executed in 1898. In the wake of this disaster, the movement was drastically reorganized by Son Byong-Hi (Uiam, 1861–1922), who modernized Donghak in line with Western standards, which he had learned during a five-year exile in Japan (under an assumed name). However, when one of his chief lieutenants advocated annexation of Korea by Japan, Uiam excommunicated him and renamed Donghak as Cheondogyo in 1905. Cheondogyo was tolerated by Japanese authorities, although it was considered a pseudo-religion. After Japan annexed Korea, Cheondogyo and Protestant leaders protested, and they were a major factor in the March First Movement of 1919 in the initial peaceful stage. Although the March First Movement failed, members of Cheondogyo remained active in many social, political, and cultural organizations during the remainder of the colonial period. However, today, only a small remnant remains in South Korea. In North Korea, it is simply a nominal component of the Workers' Party. Nevertheless, scholars such as Sr. Myongsook Moon considered the Donghak worldview and ethics to be particularly relevant in the 21st century.

Suun life was the subject of Stanley Park's 2011 film The Passion of a Man named Choe Che-u (동학, 수운 최제우).

== Works ==
His works were proscribed and burnt after his execution, but two canonical books, one of prose and one of poetry, were compiled and published later by Choe Sihyeong:

- Bible of the Donghak Doctrine (동경대전, 東經大全, Donggyeong Daejeon) in Korean-Chinese
  - Published at Inje on 15 July 1880
  - Republished in 1000 copies at Mokcheon, east of Cheonan, in February 1883
- The Hymns of Dragon Lake (용담유사, 龍潭遺詞, Yongdam Yusa) in Korean
  - Published at Danyang in July 1881

== See also ==
- Yongdamjeong
- Donghak
- Cheondogyo
