= Taoism in Korea =

Taegeukgi, the flag of South Korea, with a blue and red Taegeuk in the center.

Taoism or "Do" is thought to be the earliest state philosophy for the Korean people. However, its influence waned with the introduction of Buddhism during the Goryeo kingdom as the national religion and the dominance of neo-Confucianism during the Joseon dynasty. Despite its diminished influence during those periods, it permeated all strata of the Korean populace, integrating with its native animism as well as Buddhist and Confucian institutions, temples, and ceremonies. The Taoist practice in Korea developed, somewhat in contrast to China, as an esoteric meditative practice in the mountains taught by the "mountain masters" or "mountain sages".

One of Korea's well-known founding myths in which a tiger and a bear seek to become human during an encounter with Hwanung may be viewed as a Taoist parable. The exact origin, despite various theories by historians, is in question because the royal records maintained by the early Korean kingdoms were destroyed during the two occasions in which the royal libraries were burned by invading Chinese armies. Later attempts to study the history and philosophy of Korean Taoism were suppressed during the Joseon kingdom which embraced only Confucianism as the proper field of study.

== Background ==
Broadly speaking, Taoism, Confucianism and Buddhism infused native Totemism and Shamanism from the earliest centuries of the Common Era, but Buddhism dominated official thought during Silla and Goryeo dynasties, replaced by Confucianism during the Joseon dynasty.

Korean Taoism was influenced by Confucianism and ancient Chinese folk religion.

Very little writing on Taoism survived prior to the 20th century. Until recently, Taoism in Korea received little attention from scholars, usually only described as a "romantic influence" or "literary theme" within other contexts.

Taoism's effects have been limited because of a lack of an institutional or political base, rejected by Confucian and Buddhist elites. Some modern scholars, however, are calling for a more critical reading of Confucianized histories, study of alternative sources, and a broader definition of Taoism, to find more extensive presence of Korean Taoist ritual practices and positive valuations.

== Three Kingdoms period ==
=== Goguryeo ===
Taoism first arrived in Korea in 624. Emperor Gaozu, the founder of China's Tang dynasty, sent Taoist teachers and literature, including the Laozi and the Zhuangzi, to the Goguryeo kingdom. These were eagerly welcomed by the Goguryeo king and his minister, Yŏn Kaesomun. Buddhist temples were eventually transformed into Taoist temples. However, this initial enthusiasm lasted for only 30 years.

Some Taoist beliefs spread from Goguryeo to other places in Korea that last to the modern day.

The rise in Taoism signified a change in the development of Goguryeo Tomb Murals. The depiction of the Four Directional Deities, as well as Taoist immortals, exhibit a strong influence from Taoism in scenes painted on the walls of these tombs. Taoist symbols are found in Goguryeo tomb murals near Kangso, P'yongan-do.

Korean Taoism and Korean folk religion from this point onwards had some religious groups believing in the Tao (or Tian or Tian and Di as roughly synonymous beings) as a thinking divine entity similar to a monotheistic god. The Tao most often coexisted with another Tao that was non-sapient and represented the laws of nature and "polytheistic belief[s] in ancestral spirits and nature deities".

=== Baekje ===
Baekje, one of three kingdoms into which ancient Korea was divided before 660. Occupying the southwestern tip of the Korean peninsula, Baekje is traditionally said to have been founded in 18 BCE in the Gwangju area by a legendary leader named Onjo. By the 3rd century CE, during the reign of King Koi (234–286), Baekje emerged as a fully developed kingdom. Taoism was mentioned in some treatises, but wasn’t explicitly studied.

Baekje visual art reveals technical maturity alongside warm human qualities in Taoism, sometimes attributed to the influence of the Six Dynasties-period southern Chinese art. These qualities are evident, for example, in softly modeled Buddha statues in relaxed poses, with their distinctive and expressive “Baekje smile.”

Another notable artistic contribution of the Baekje kingdom is its tiles decorated with fine landscape paintings. Also in the field of ceramics, Baekje potters produced two distinct types of wares: high-fired stoneware and light-brown low-fired pottery. Bulbous jars, footed vessels, and tripods are common shapes. A typical Baekje decoration is the use of check stamps. Another product of the potter was roof tiles decorated with lotus petals. Baekje sculpture is perhaps best seen in gilt-bronze statues of the Buddha and the carved stone cliff faces, such as at Sosan.

A significant figure in Baekje Taoism and Buddhism was Gwalleuk, a Korean Buddhist monk from the kingdom who lived during the reign of King Wideok. In 602, he travelled to Japan and is known for helping to spread the teachings of Taoism and Buddhism to Japan. In particular, he brought over fangshu texts related to the likes of geomancy and onmyōdō (yinyang-based sorcery and divination), as well as a calendar, according to the Nihon Shoki.

=== Silla ===
Silla, a Korean Kingdom in the southern and central parts of the Korean Peninsula, was the smallest of the three kingdoms in Korea. Silla is traditionally believed to have been founded by Hyeokgeose in 57 BCE. The Silla Unification of Korea in 668 refers to the historical process in which the Silla Kingdom conquered the rival kingdoms of Baekje and Goguryeo and unified the region. Silla, having received Lao-tzu's Tao Te Ching in 738 from the Tang emperor, left the most substantial legacy of Taoism. Silla experienced significant cultural and artistic changes. Silla's growth came with a continuous development of new philosophies and beliefs that coexisted with previous indigenous faiths.

During this period, a majority of the citizens were Buddhist, but around this period, we saw other religions like shamanism and Taoism emerge. Indigenous to China, Taoism is an ancient Chinese philosophy focusing on living in harmony with the Tao, or the universe. Taoists also believed in spiritual immortality. Sinseon Sasang, another Korean Taoist-influenced belief system, was relatively widespread in Silla and had its roots in animistic folk beliefs and practices.

According to the Silla annals of the Samguk sagi, religion was significant in all walks of life in Korean societies and formed a basis for state rule. Taoist thought and schools were widespread in Silla. Silla scholars even went to China to study Taoism.

Taoist thought was usually related to beliefs in mountain spirits. Looking at the geographical features of the Kyôngju region, it is surrounded on all sides by mountain peaks, and we can infer that Taoist thought proved to cause much fertility in Silla. According to the Silla annals of the Samguk sagi, religion was significant in all walks of life in Korean societies and formed a basis for state rule. Taoist thought and schools were widespread in Silla. Taoist thought was usually related to beliefs in mountain spirits (Lee, 4). One of the best-known examples of Taoist thought is the strong sense of esteem that citizens of Silla felt for the youth training and military corps called Hwarang-do. They embodied Taoist principles through nature worship. This involved wandering in the mountains to cultivate Ki (vital energy), and practicing non-action (natural flow).

== Goryeo ==
Taoism enjoyed its greatest popularity during the Goryeo dynasty, especially in the court and the ruling class. Taoist court rituals were introduced into Korea from Song dynasty China, especially under King Yejong (r. 1105–1122). The object of worship in these rituals included most of the major and minor deities of the Taoist pantheon, but certain deities such as Samgye and T'aeil seem to have been the most popular.

By the mid period of the Goryeo dynasty, Buddhism dominated Korea, subsuming other religions and philosophies, including Taoism.

== Joseon ==
The state religion under the Joseon dynasty can be described as Neo-Confucianism, although not popular among the common people. At least at the start of the dynasty, Taoist literature was quite popular among groups of the intelligentsia. These writings on Taoism were predominantly from a Confucian perspective. However, there was a growing opposition from the Yi dynasty and Confucian political factions against Taoism, and Taoism began to be perceived as "heretical". However, Taoists were not as persecuted as much as Buddhists. Subsequently, the presence of Taoism shrank noticeably, and during the 1592 Japanese invasion, Taoism was systematically abolished.

In the 16th to 18th centuries, Taoism flourished, as literati, monks, private scholars (sarim), and even women, studied and practiced Taoist meditation and inner alchemy (naedan/Danhak) and produced hagiographic and anecdotal accounts of their Taoist contemporaries and forebears. The most important of these accounts known to date are four anecdotal biographies of immortals (Sason chon) in the collected writings of Hŏ Kyun (1569–1618), the Ch'onghakjip (Collected Discourses of Master Blue Crane) by Cho Yojok (early 17th century).

Commoners also practiced Taoism and liturgy among them often included invocations to Chinese Taoist deities.

While these were written to encourage Koreans to practice inner alchemy for the sake of immortality (i.e., deliverance from the corpse), they also re-envision and broaden the meaning of Korean religious history by reiterating nativist and folk traditions about the role of Korean mountain recluses and earthbound immortals in the maintenance and protection of Korean society.

== Modern presence ==
Since the late Joseon dynasty, Taoism has been marginalized not only by the Korean Royal Court, Confucians, and Buddhists but also by society as a whole. Due to such a history, only a handful of Taoists exist throughout Korea today.

Taoism has been absorbed into the traditional Korean vision of the world, a world view in which shamanistic, Confucian, Buddhist, and Taoist elements are so intimately intertwined that often only a scholar can distinguish which is which.

Evidence of Taoist revival can be seen in Tanjeon Hoheup, Tonghak and Kouk Sun Do. Even if the term "Taoism" is not used, the terms, techniques, and goals are clearly Taoist. The Taoist mark of Chinese characters su (longevity) and bok (bliss) decorate many everyday articles, from spoons to pillow cases, even today. Many place names, especially related to mountains, bear strong Taoist influence.

The Taoist symbol Taegeuk is featured in the flag of South Korea, and Chondoism is the Korean religion with more presence in North Korea, when Chondoist people are represented in politics by Chondoist Chongu Party.

Starting December 2013 and ending in March 2014, the National Museum of Korea held an exhibit dubbed, "Taoist Culture in Korea: The Road to Happiness." The exhibit featured hundreds of pieces of Taoist art and other artifacts from earlier dynasties and kingdoms. One of the few notable artifacts present at the exhibition was the Baekje Gilt-Bronze Incense Burner, which is known for its heavy influence from Buddhism and Taoism.

Modern Korean Taoist organizations are often heavily inspired by Way of the Celestial Masters beliefs, and sometimes syncretize with shamanistic and other native Korean religious practices taken from antiquity to current times.

== See also ==
- Taoism
- Korean Buddhism
- Korean Confucianism
- Korean Shamanism
- Tonghak

== Noted scholars ==
- Yi Kyugyŏng (1788–?) was a Silhak scholar wrote many articles on Taoism.
- Hwadam Sŏ Kyŏngdŏk
- Maewŏltang Kim Sisŭp
