= Jang Il-soon =

South Korean educator (1928–1994)

- Hangul: 장일순
- Hanja: 張壹淳
- RR: Jang Ilsun
- MR: Chang Ilsun

Jang Il-Soon (3 September 1928 in Wonju – 22 May 1994) was a South Korean educator and social and environment activist. His pen names are Chunggang (clean water), Muwydang (wu-wei), and Ilsokja (a hulled millet). He was a spiritual supporter of poet Kim Chi-Ha, who represented the democratization movement in the 1970s and developed a campaign for life through Hansallim. In 1994, he died from stomach cancer.

== Biography ==
As a child, Jang learned an esteem for life and calligraphy from his grandfather and Chagang Park, Ki Jung. In 1940, he graduated from Wonju elementary school, and was Christened John after being baptized at Won-Dong Catholic church. He studied at Henry Appenzeller's Pai Chai Middle School and Pai Chai High School in Seoul. After graduating from high school, he attended Gyeongseong Industrial Technical School (경성공업전문학교) in Seoul, but was expelled for opposing the appointment of John R. Hodge to lead the United States Army Military Government in Korea. At that time he met Choi Je-woo and Choi Shi-hyung, who were major influences on him. In 1946, he entered began studying aesthetics at Seoul National University, but left and returned to his hometown during the Korean War in 1950.

In 1954, Jang established the Dae-Sung school in Wonju in order to pass on the teachings of An Chang-ho, and participated in the One World Movement, comparing notes with Albert Einstein. From 1961 to 1963, Jang was incarcerated in Seodaemun Prison and Chuncheon Prison, because he advocated neutrality, peace, and unification. After being discharged from prison, he was kept under watch, so he remained in seclusion and concentrated on calligraphy. In 1971, he joined a street demonstration for social justice and struggled against the despotism of Park Chung-hee with Catholic bishop Ji Hak-soon. In 1973, Jang also helped start a disaster measure committee for assisting in disaster relief after flooding and advocated for miners' rights. In 1977, he switched from working for manual laborers and farmers to advocating for life based on symbiosis. In 1983, he established Hansallim union and held six private exhibitions in Seoul to promote the union, which is an organization established to connect rural farmers directly with urban customers. In 1989, he built a monument to Dong Hak's second leader, Choi Shi-hyung, in Hojeo-myun, Wonju, where he was arrested by government troops. In 1993, he published a book, Lao-tzu Story Of Jang Il-soon, which analyzed his views of life, with the help of minister Lee Hyun-ju.
