= Cheondoism =

Korean panentheistic religion

- Flag representing Cheondoism

Korean name
- Hangul: 천도교
- Hanja: 天道敎
- Lit.: Religion of the Celestial Way
- RR: Cheondogyo
- MR: Ch'ŏndogyo

Cheondoism (spelled Chondoism in North Korea; Korean: 천도교) is a 20th-century Korean panentheistic religion, based on the 19th-century Donghak religious movement founded by Choe Je-u and codified under Son Byong-hi. Cheondoism has its origins in the peasant rebellions which arose starting in 1812 during the Joseon.

Cheondoism is monistic and incorporates elements of Korean shamanism. It places emphasis on personal cultivation and social welfare in the present world. Splinter movements include Suwunism and Bocheonism.

== Name ==
Cheondogyo literally means "religion of the Celestial Way", where cheon means "sky", do means "way" (written with the same character as Chinese Tao), and gyo means "religion", "teaching", or "-ism".

== Beliefs ==
Over time, Cheondoism has also adapted elements of other Korean religious traditions, including Do (Taoism) and Buddhism.

In keeping with its roots in Korean Confucianism, Cheondoism venerates Cheon ("Sky" or "Heaven") as the ultimate principle of good and justice, which is referred to by the honorific term Haneullim (하늘님), or "Divinity". According to church doctrine, the term Haneul does not only mean "Sky"; it represents the whole universe or "oneness", as well. This title implies the quality of Heaven as "instructor"; a belief that humans and things are not created by a supernatural God but generated by a God-nature present in all living and unliving things.

Also in keeping with its Confucian background, Cheondoism places emphasis on self-improvement in the hope that, as one improves one's innate nature, one comes closer to the Sky; that all beings' relationship to God can be measured by their nearness or distance to their innate God-nature. Choe Si Hyong, the leader who published Cheondoism's scriptures, established the core principle of the unity of all things based on this innate presence of the divine. This principle carried with it a sense that "to serve a person is to serve Heaven".

Roland Boer summarizes the cultural impact of Chondoism as follows:

Chondoism bequeathed to Korean culture a number of principles, with an explicit drive to social and religious equality. These include: 'my heart is your heart', with reference both to others and to 'heaven'; 'treat humans as God' in a challenge to Confucian hierarchies; 'protect the nation, secure peace to the people' with a clear reference to Korea in relation to foreign powers; 'all people evolve toward unity' which has gained even more traction with the split between north and south; and 'the Kingdom of heaven on earth'.

== History ==
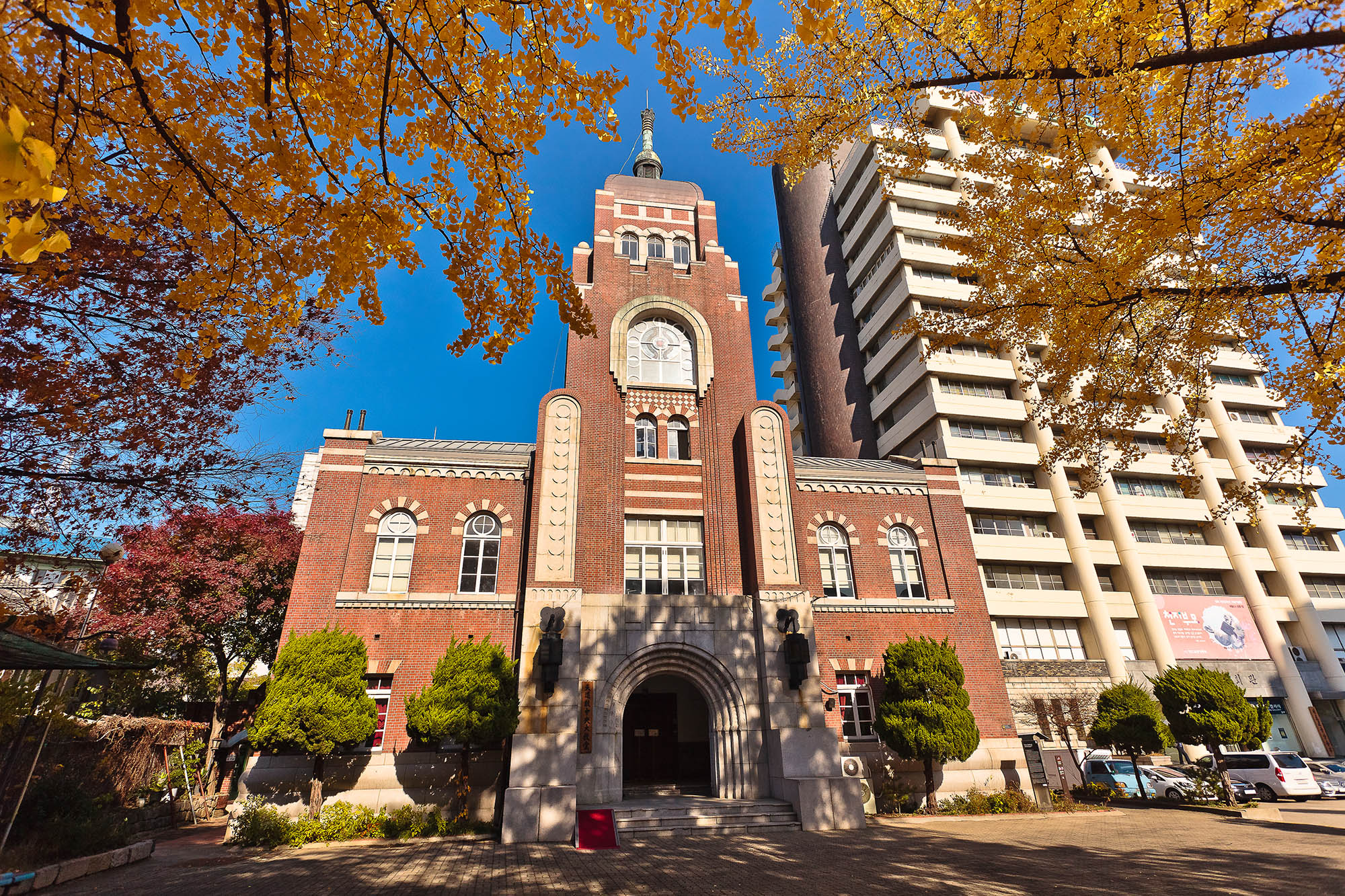
Cheondogyo Central Temple in Seoul

Cheondoism originated from the Tonghak ("Eastern Learning"), a religious movement that arose in 19th-century Korea as a reaction to Western encroachment, particularly the spread of Catholicism. The Donghak movement began with Ch'oe Che-u in 1860, who formulated the Donghak ideology in 1860 as an alternative to Catholicism ("Western Learning"), which was gaining momentum within the lower classes in Korea due to its ability to provide a sense of structure and stability beyond the family unit. Due to its basis in established religions—Confucianism, Buddhism, and Taoism—and its commitment to representing Eastern ideals, the movement rapidly gained broad acceptance among the peasantry. The movement "offered the most oppressed and downtrodden of Korean society a sense of their intrinsic worth." Because the movement taught that the divine could be lived out on earth (a teaching with "immense socio-economic implications"), it was viewed unfavorably by local landlords and foreign powers who sought to outlaw the movement and oversaw Ch'oe's trial and execution in 1864.

Cheondoism became an officially-recognized religion under its third leader, Son Byong-hi.

Cheondoism as a religion evolved in the early 1900s from the Donghak peasant liberation movements in the southern provinces of Korea, particularly the unsuccessful, yet consequential, rebellion of 1894. Followers of Donghak were severely persecuted until the establishment of the Protectorate Treaty of 1905, which guaranteed freedom of religion. Therefore, on 1 December 1905, Son Byong-hi decided to modernize the religion and usher in an era of openness and transparency in order to legitimize it in the eyes of the Japanese, who had strong influence over Korea at the time. As a result, he officially changed the name of Donghak to Cheondoism ("religion of the Celestial Way"). Following this, a constitution and a Central General Bureau were laid out for the religion, centralizing it and making it more accessible to the public.

== Recent history ==
As of 2005, Cheondoism reportedly had about 45,000 followers and 280 churches in South Korea. According to the 2015 national census, Cheondoism had about 65,000 followers in South Korea.

In North Korea, the state recognizes and favors Chondoism as a distinctly Korean revolutionary religion. Chondoists are nominally represented in North Korean politics by the minor Chondoist Chongu Party.

North Korean leader Kim Il Sung's memoirs recount at length an effort to persuade his communist comrades to accept a Chondoist recruit. While Kim's memoirs lightly criticize the Korean faith (given his own Marxist–Leninist perspective), they also stress how Chondoism draws close to the Korean form of communism. Among other aspects, Kim's memoirs highlight Chondoism's concern for the intrinsic worth of all people, especially the poor and lowly. According to Kim, Chondoism is a "progressive religion" characterized by the novelty of its principles, its spirit of resistance, the simplicity of its rites and practices, and its inherently popular nature.

== See also ==
- Chondoist Chongu Party
- Donghak
- Donghak Peasant Revolution
- Korean shamanism (Sinism)
- New religious movement
- Taoism in Korea
- Yongdamjeong

== Sources ==
- Lee Chi-ran. Chief Director, Haedong Younghan Academy. The Emergence of National Religions in Korea.
- Young, Carl F. Associate Professor, Western University. Eastern Learning and the Heavenly Way: The Tonghak and Chondogyo Movements and the Twilight of Korean Independence.
