= Son Byong-hi =

Korean religious leader (1861–1922)

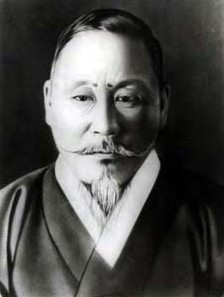

Korean name
- Hangul: 손병희
- Hanja: 孫秉熙
- RR: Son Byeonghui
- MR: Son Pyŏnghŭi

Religious name
- Hangul: 의암
- Hanja: 義菴
- RR: Uiam
- MR: Ŭiam

Son Byong-hi (Korean: 손병희; 8 April 1861 – 19 May 1922) was a Korean religious leader and independence activist. His religious name was Uiam. He was the third leader of Donghak, an indigenous religious movement founded from 1860 to 1864.

The founder of Donghak, Choe Je-u (religious name Su-un), and the second leader, Choe Sihyeong (religious name Haewol), had both been executed. Haewol, Son's mentor and predecessor, was involved in a peasant revolt in 1894 (referred to as the Donghak Peasant Revolution) and he was executed in connection with that in 1898. Thereafter, Son assumed leadership of Donghak but was forced to flee to Japan in March 1901. He was accompanied by his brother and chief lieutenant Yi Yong-gu.

In Japan, Son studied modern western ways which had been adopted by the Japanese after the Meiji Restoration. Up to that point Donghak was highly traditional, opposed to modernization and foreign intervention in Korea. Son pivoted from that world view by embracing modernization and accepting help from Japan to achieve that goal.

In 1902, Yi returned to Korea. At Son's direction, Yi founded political organizations which promoted modernization and aid to Japan during the Russo-Japanese War. Yi eventually went so far as to call for Japan to take over Korea's affairs.

In any event, after Japan forced Korea to become its protectorate, Son began to distance Donghak from Japanese affiliation. Son renamed Donghak as Cheondogyo (Ch'ŏndogyo, Religion of the Heavenly Way) on 1 December 1905. In September1906, he excommunicated Yi, who went on to form another branch of Donghak.

In 1910 Japan annexed Korea. As Japanese rule became more harsh, Koreans became restive. Finally on March 1, 1919, a mass demonstration calling for Korean independence was held. Cheondogyo, Christian and Buddhist religious leaders were at the forefront. Son read the Declaration of Independence, which he had been the first to sign. The demonstrations were brutally suppressed by the Japanese. Son was arrested, became ill in prison, was released, and died at home in 1922.

== Biography ==
=== Early life ===
Son was born on 8 April 1861 in Cheongju, Chungcheong Province, Joseon. He was of the Miryang Son clan. Son was the son of the concubine of a minor official, and as such he was ineligible for government office. However, he was able to attain an education. He was introduced to Donghak by his nephew who was a preacher and he joined in 1881 or 1882. He devoted himself to the new religion and was said to engage in long recitations of the Donghak incantation, the 21-character Jumun. He met Haewol and accompanied him on a 49-day retreat. His ties to Haewol were strengthened when Haewol married Son's sister after his first wife died. (Note: Some details concerning Uiam's life are taken from the official web site of Cheondogyo (Chondogyo). This is the renamed branch of Donghak established by Uiam as described below. Some of these details are not found in histories of the other major branch of Donghak established by Yi Yong-gu which was known as Sijeongyo. Instances of material differences are noted.)

The Cheondogyo website includes a history with this description of Son's dedication: "After joining Donghak, ESon Sungsa . . . trained [extensively] reading [reciting] the Twenty-One [Character] Incantation thirty thousand times a day. In addition to reading the incantation in this way he made . . . straw sandals every day in his spare time. He went to the five-day periodic market in Cheongju and sold these sandals. He continued this life for three years." After this period, Son became the student of Haewol and entered a life of devoted study.

=== Petition and 1894 rebellion ===
Donghak's founder Su-un had been executed in 1864 for his teachings which were heretical from a Neo-Confucian perspective and his assumed association with Catholicism. However, by the early 1890s, Donghak had regained popularity particularly in Chungcheong and Jeolla provinces. Haewol was pressed to petition the government to exonerate Su-un and he complied. While the petition movement was initially peaceful it turned violent, despite Haewol's effort to prevent that from happening. This eventually led to a full scale revolt known as the Donghak Peasant Revolution. The Korean government requested aid from China to suppress the revolt which prompted Japan to deploy its army as well. Initially, only Donghak followers from the southern assembly, led by General Jeon Bongjun, participated while followers from the northern assembly held back. In the end, Haewol allowed his followers to join the rebels. but their joint force was defeated by the Japanese and Korean armies which had modern weapons. Jeon dispersed his rebel army on 28 November 1894, and was subsequently captured and executed. Donghak followers, particularly in the southern assembly were decimated. The northern assembly was less affected and Haewol managed to escape.

Cheondogyo sources indicate that Son participated in the petition movement and was a leader of northern assembly forces in the rebellion. Histories from Sijeongyo and outside sources make no mention of participation by Son. In any event, Son was in Haewol's inner circle following the rebellion.

=== Aftermath of the rebellion ===
Following the rebel defeat, Haewol and the top leadership of Donghak remained on the run from government authorities. However, in 1895/96, Haewol began to rebuild the Donghak organization. He established a three person leadership group including Son called the Samam (the three "am", referring to the last character of their religious names). It was at this time Son was given his honorific religious name. The Samam were charged with administering Donghak (under Haewol's direction) with "one heart and mind".

Son and other leaders travel to the northern provinces of Hwanghae and Pyeongan provinces to proselytize. Yi Yong-gu, an associate of Son was a particularly successful missionary and Haewol rejoiced at the success there. From that time the northwest became the main center of Donghak. The expansion there continued up until the time of Haewol's death.

After living as a fugitive for 36 years, Haewol was becoming old and frail. He was captured by pursuing government troops in 1898 and executed. Cheondogyo sources claimed that Son was chosen by Haewol to become the next leader. Sijeongyo sources claimed that Kim Yon-guk (another member of the Samam) was destined to be the leader. The third member of the Samam had been arrested and executed. In any event, after Kim was arrested Son emerged as the recognized leader of Donghak.

=== Refuge in Japan ===
In March 1901, Son, his brother and Yi Yong-gu, fled to Japan. Son used an assumed name to avoid arrest. He had considered going to the United States but decided on Japan as the best place to learn of modern western culture while remaining close enough to Korea to monitor developments there and to maintain control of Donghak. His primary aim was to learn modern ways which seemed to give western nations and Japan their power. He hoped to modernize Donghak and in so doing Donghak could help to modernize and strengthen the Korean nation. He went back to Korea briefly and returned to Japan with 24 students who studied Japanese language and trained in modern ways. Many additional students came later.

While in Japan, he mingled with former leaders of the Gabo Reformist cabinet who must have helped him develop his reformist ideas. This was a dramatic reversal from the sentiments of General Jeon Bongjun, who had cursed Gabo reformists as pro-Japanese "traitors" before he was executed. Son was even able to convert some of these Gabo reformists to Donghak.

Yi was sent back to Korea in 1902 and became the chief liaison between Son and Donghak followers in Korea. At Son's direction he founded Jungniphoe (Chungniphoe "neutrality society"), a political organization which was later reorganized as the Jinbohoe (Chinbohoe "progressive society"). This coordinated series of activities was known as the Gapjin reform movement. A captured letter written by Yi described eight founding principles for Jinbohoe:

1. The name of the organization is to be the Jinbohoe.
2. The organization is to be started from this date (fifth day of the eighth month, 1904).
3. Protect [national] independence.
4. Give opinions on government reform.
5. Help improve people's livelihood and productivity.
6. Bring [public] finances into order.
7. Assist the allied country's military (i.e., Japan).
8. Members must cut their hair.

Mass hair cutting ceremonies were one of the most notable signs of the organization of the Jinbohoe. The first official Cheondogyo history, Pongyo Yoksa, written in 1912, states that the cutting of hair was seen by Son as a sign that Korea and Donghak were becoming part of the contemporary world. Around 160,000 people participated in one of these events. Many Jinbohoe members wore black, Western-style clothes, in apparent emulation of Japanese practice. The hair cutting was a significant departure from Neo-Confucian ideals because: "one's body, including the hair and skin, came from one's parents, and therefore should not be hurt or damaged. Hurting one's body meant hurting one's parents' bones and flesh; therefore, it was regarded as disrespect towards parents." In Joseon Korean, men tied their hair in a topknot when they married, and it became a symbol of manhood. Furthermore, earlier forced haircutting of Koreans, including the King Gojong, by the Japanese was considered a major humiliation.

As noted above one of the founding principles of Jinbohoe was to aid Japan. In 1903, a plan was devised for driving the pro-Russian faction from the Korean government. Donghak members would lead Japanese soldiers who would enter Korea disguised as merchants. Donghak and Japanese elements would then make a coordinated attack on Seoul. Son's brother met with a Japanese general, the deputy chief of staff, and received enthusiastic support for the idea. However, the plan was abandoned before it could be carried out when the brother and general died unexpectedly. Carl Young made the following comment about this episode:

[It] might seem strange that he [Son] and his Korean reformist friends actually agreed to plot with the Japanese to overthrow the Korean government. It is important to note, however, that those desiring change in Korean government often looked to Japan's Meiji Restoration as an example that Korea could follow, and this often led reformists to seek Japanese help to implement their vision.

In 1903, Son synthesized his new reform ideas in two essays called Samjonnon (The theory of the three wars), and Myongnijon (The essay for explaining the doctrine). These were incorporated into the Donghak/Cheondogyo canon. Myongnijon includes the concept that Donghak "should fight on two frontiers, the political and the moral. This struggle should begin with moral enlightenment of the people in Donghak doctrine. He also stressed the importance of a national religion: "Each country in the world safeguards religious enlightenment, protects its people and teaches them an occupation, making their countries as safe as the Tai Mountains [in China]"

Samjonnon proposed three means for attaining a stronger nation: religion, the military and industrialization. As summarized by Yumi Moon: "Even if the people could not immediately overcome the military strength of the West, they could compete with the West by pursuing moral superiority and by accumulating economic power by industrialization." Son viewed this struggle as a pan-Asian effort that was expressed through the use of terms such as "We Asians" and "Our Asian Land". When the Russo-Japanese War (1904–1905) broke out, Son contributed 10,000 won to the Japanese government to aid its war efforts. A Cheondogyo history notes: "that this money was a token of "his support for the yellow race fighting to expel the white race."

Around the time that Jinbohoe was formed, the Japanese sponsored another reform organization called the Iljinhoe (Advancement Society, or Advance in Unity Society). Both societies had similar objectives, but the latter was more pro-Japanese and had the protection of the Japanese authorities. The Ilchinhoe was composed primarily of elites and was centered in Seoul. The Jinbohoe was composed primarily of people of lower status and was centered in the provinces. Leaders in each organization realized that it would be advantageous to collaborate, and the collaboration eventually led to their merger in early December 1904. Yi became president of the provincial assemblies. The synergies led to Ilchinhoe becoming the largest popular organization in the country. Its main activities included promotion of education, economic development, defense of people's rights and aid to the Japanese in the Russo-Japanese War. A prime example of the latter was the contribution of three thousand volunteers during the construction of a railway to facilitate troop movements.

However, Ilchinhoe's increasing cooperation with the Japanese caused it to become a target of those opposed to Japanese presence in Korea, most notably by members of the Uibyeong or Righteous Armies. The righteous armies were composed of soldiers, peasants and conservative scholars with a neo-Confucian worldview. They staged attacks on Ilchinhoe in 1904 and 1905. In response, Ilchinhoe organized self-defense units and became more attached to the Japanese for protection. Son was still in Japan at the time but the union of Jinbohoe and Ilchinhoe must have had his tacit approval at least in the beginning.

=== Russo-Japanese War ===
After Japan emerged victorious in the Russo-Japanese war, Russia acknowledged Japanese dominance in Korea. Other nations including the United States followed suit, at least implicitly. At that point Yi and Ilchinhoe called for Korea to become a protectorate of Japan. Yi was perhaps motivated to do so in order to maintain Ilchinhoe and his own power and influence and to help implement the Ilchinhoe agenda. This action by Yi shocked Son and he summoned him to Japan to explain. Yi did not back away from his action and argued that the protectorate status would be a benefit to the Korean nation. The lure of the protectorate status was that Japan would help modernize Korea and then grant it independence at some future time.

On 17 November 1905, Japan forced the signing of the Japan–Korea Treaty of 1905, also known as the Eulsa Treaty, that made Korea a Japanese protectorate. Its legality has been disputed. According to Carl Young "[Son's] policy had been alliance with Japan not Japanese control over Korean affairs. [He] probably felt betrayed and from this time on he began to increasingly distance himself from them."

In order to regain his leadership roll and to distance Donghak from the Ilchinhoe and its Japanese connection, Son renamed it Cheondogyo (Religion of the Heavenly Way) on 1 December 1905. The new name emphasized its religious status and de-emphasized its previous political activism. That shift qualified it for legal protection under Japan's freedom of religion policy. However, he was not in a position to simply break away from Yi and his followers at that point. Many of Yi's followers were Donghak leaders and an outright break would have likely led them to defect. When the Cheondogyo constitution was announced in February 1906, Yi was given a leadership position in its central headquarters.

In January 1906, Son returned to Korea to personally supervise Cheondogyo. He arrived in Pusan where he was greeted by 40,000 followers. In Seoul, he was greeted by 80,000 followers. Once in Korea, he reorganized the Cheondogyo administrative structure. The constitution or charter was proclaimed as binding in February. This 41-page document is referred to as the Cheondogyo Daeheon (Ch'ŏndogyo Taehŏn, Charter of the Heavenly Way Religion). Carl Young summarized the governance and responsibilities contained in the charter in an organizational chart. At the top was the Taedoju (Leader of the Great Way), the position filled by Son. The office of Administration and Doctrine was presided over by Kim Yon-guk, one of the previous members of Haewol's Samam and who had been released from prison by that time. Yi Yong-gu was assigned a position in the four-member Bureau of Advisors. The charter specified that the headquarters would be in Seoul, which placed it closer to the national center of power. As noted by George Kallander: "Under [Son's] leadership, church leaders no longer hid deep in the mountains or at Buddhist temples, creating problems for the state or alarming the foreign community or governments. Instead, they were drawn into the social and political fold."

Although Son had given Yi a prominent position in the Cheondogyo leadership, Yi's association with Ilchinhoe became increasingly problematic. Ilchinhoe had begun to harass those who did not agree with its modernization policies and to carryout negative publicity campaigns against politicians that were not in full agreement with it. Cheondogyo's perceived association with it became a public relations disaster and even led to violent attacks on it by the Righteous Armies. Son initiated a series of actions that diminished Yi's influence in Cheondogyo and ultimately excommunicated him in September 1906.

Son's writings at that time emphasized that there was a clear lineage from the founder Su-un, Haewol the chosen second leader and himself. A Cheondogyo doctrinal text from the period states: "The Great Teacher Su-un is the founder of Cheondogyo." Nevertheless, he shifted the focus of some religious concepts developed by these previous leaders. For example, the division between heaven and God became less distinct. He instilled heaven with spirituality by using declarations such as: "Heaven is divine. "As there is only one spirit, it is the source of the Way". The Heavenly Way is the utmost pure and sincere." His concept of heaven diverged from the Neo-Confucian toward the Christian concept, although the texts took pains to emphasize the "blurry" differences. Koreans held a special place in the divine order; he stated that although the Lord on High is the father of all people he loves "our country". He also described Su-un as the "child of the Lord High God".

His writing also adopted a more egalitarian tone. While Su-un's writing often referred to his disciples as "gentlemen"; Son used a more generic term connoting "people". He also stated that there was equality between high and low classes, although he did not advocate the elimination of the distinction.

Rituals similar to mainstream Christian services were also adopted. Services were held once a week on Sundays, a day of rest. Previously, Donghak initiation rituals were held usually on mountaintops on the first and fifteenth days of the month, followed by singing and dancing. The new rituals were standardized, and the more shamanistic elements were eliminated. Key elements included recitation of the Donghak talisman, presentation of a bowl of pure water to represent the clarity of heaven and an offering. Prayer was not directed to an external God but was a meditation to draw closer to God/Heaven immanent in the human heart.

=== March First Movement ===
During the five years of the protectorate period and even after annexation in 1910, many Koreans had accepted Japan's control as unavoidable and a temporary state of affairs which would allow Korea to modernize. However as Japanese rule became increasingly harsh and inflexible, Koreans became restive. Religious organizations, which were protected under Japan's freedom of religion policy, became an important channel for expression of nationalistic sentiments because political parties like Ilchinhoe had been banned. Cheondogyo and Protestant groups (Presbyterians and Methodists) were particularly active in this respect. Cheondogyo under the leadership of Son was able to adopt a more nationalistic stance without arousing Japanese suspicion in part because the authorities still considered it pro-Japanese.

Protestants under encouragement from foreign missionaries were promoting Democratic ideals similar to those espoused in the West. They also invoked images of the Children of Israel under foreign bondage. Buddhist also became more nationalistic in part because they were resentful of Japanese attempts to pressure them to be instruments of Japanese policy.

World War I, then underway, may have given inspiration for a righteous crusade against tyranny. After the war, the Paris Peace accords and Woodrow Wilson's philosophy of "self-determination of peoples" became important motivations. Son's Cheondogyo gave financial support to the movement, and he insisted that the independence movement must be popular in nature and non-violent. A Declaration of Independence was prepared which was signed by 33 religious leaders, 15 of which were members of Cheondogyo. Son was the most prominent of these, and he was the first to sign.

The climax came on 1 March 1919 when, during a period of public mourning for the recently deceased Emperor Gojong, the Declaration of Independence was publicly proclaimed at Pagoda Park in Seoul—this was known as the March First Movement, or Samil Movement. Son read the declaration in the presence of the other signers at a well-known restaurant near the park. The indoor location was chosen to avoid violence. They sent a complimentary copy to the Japanese governor-general and telephoned the police to report what they had done and that they were waiting for arrest. A large crowd gathered at the park including five or six thousand students. The protest was initially peaceful but turned violent. The public took to the streets and demonstrated, calling for Korean independence. This initiated a nationwide movement in which many people took part, regardless of locality and social status, but the Japanese immediately mobilized their police and army and brutally put down the demonstrations. More than 7,500 Koreans were killed, nearly 17,000 wounded, and around 47,000 arrested, including Son.

While in prison, Son became ill and was eventually released from custody on sick bail. His illness worsened, however, and in 1922 he died at home in Sangchunwon, just outside the Dongdaemun gate.

== Legacy ==
Son, Son Byeong-hi, has become a symbol of Korean nationalism. He is depicted in a large statue at the entrance of Independence Park (formerly Pagoda Park in the center of Seoul where the Declaration of Independence was proclaimed). However, the focus on nationalist aspects of Cheondogyo seems to have detracted from its identity as a religion. Less than 1% of South Koreans affiliate themselves with Cheondogyo. Government figures for 1998 indicated membership at about 26,000.

The Taekwon-Do pattern Eui-Am was named in honor of Son Byong-Hi after his respectful title of Eui-am Seong-sa.

== See also ==
- History of Korea
- Korean independence movement
