= Tonghak =

Korean neo-Confucian movement

- Hangul: 동학
- Hanja: 東學
- RR: Donghak
- MR: Tonghak

During the Tonghak Peasant Revolution, peasant armies flew banners reading "oppose Japan and the West and uphold righteousness" (척왜양창의; 斥倭洋倡義).

Tonghak (Korean: 동학; Hanja: 東學; RR: Donghak; lit. 'Eastern learning') was an academic movement in Korean Neo-Confucianism founded in 1860 by Ch'oe Cheu. The Tonghak movement arose as a reaction to seohak (lit. '"Western learning"'), and called for a return to the "Way of Heaven". While Tonghak originated as a reform movement and revival of Confucian teachings, it gradually evolved into a religion known today as Cheondoism in Korea under the third patriarch Son Byong-hi.

== History ==
Joseon, which patronized Neo-Confucianism as the state ideology, saw an increasing polarization between orthodox Confucian scholars and efforts by other Confucian scholars to revive social ethics and reform society. The increasing presence and pressure from the West created a greater sense of urgency among reformers, and thus Ch'oe Cheu first penned his treatise, Comprehensive Book of Eastern Learning, or Dongkyeong Daejeon (동경대전; 東經大全). This treatise marked the first use of the term "Eastern Learning" and called for a rejection of God (in the Christian sense), and other aspects of Christian theology.

Choe was alarmed by the intrusion of Christianity (천주교, Cheonjugyo; Catholicism), and the Anglo-French occupation of Beijing. He believed that the best way to counter foreign influence in Korea was to introduce democracy, establish human rights and create a paradise on Earth independent of foreign interference.

He started a peasant rebellion by converting them to Tonghak and, along with other anti-government civic activists, took over parts of southern Korea from 1862 to 1864 until Choe was executed.

The movement was continued by Choe Si-hyeong (1829–1898), who systematized its doctrine. He too was executed.

In 1898, following the execution of Choe Si-hyeong, the leader of Tonghak, Son Byong-hi, sought political asylum in nearby Japan. After the Russo-Japanese War in 1904, he returned to Korea and established the Chinbohoe ("progressive society"), a new cultural and reformist movement designed to reverse the declining fortunes of the nation and to create a new society. Through Tonghak he conducted a nationwide movement that aimed at social improvement through the renovation of old customs and ways of life. Hundreds of thousands of members of Tonghak cut their long hair short and initiated the wearing of simple, modest clothing. Non-violent demonstrations for social improvement organized by members of Tonghak took place throughout 1904.

Under the third patriarch of the Tonghak movement, Son Byeong-hui, the movement became a religion called Cheondogyo, or Cheondoism, which is followed today in both North and South Korea.

== Ch'oe Cheu ==
Ch'oe Cheu's treatise argued a return to the Confucian understanding of Heaven, with emphasis on self-cultivation and improving one's nature. As Choe wrote, the Way of Heaven was within one's own mind, and so by improving one's nature, one also attained the Way of Heaven.

Tonghak was not accompanied by a specific agenda or systematic doctrine. Choe believed in improvising as events occurred. He had no practical plans or visions of how one would go about establishing a paradise on Earth, let alone what paradise meant except that all people were equal. Nevertheless, Choe's advocacy of democracy, human rights and Korean nationalism struck a chord among the peasant guerrillas and Tonghak spread across Korea rapidly. Progressive revolutionaries waded in and organized the peasants into a cohesive fighting unit.

== See also ==
- Cheondoism
- Yongdamjeong
- Tonghak Peasant Revolution
- Gapsin Coup
- Jang Il-soon, who built a monument to Dong Hak's second leader, Choi Shi-hyung
- Liberalism in South Korea
- New religious movements
- Righteous Army
