= List of British films of 2020 =

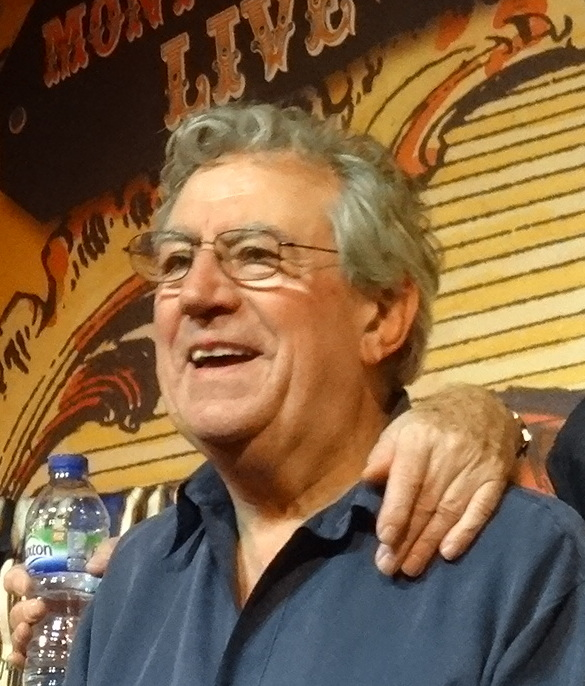
2020 saw the death of Terry Jones.

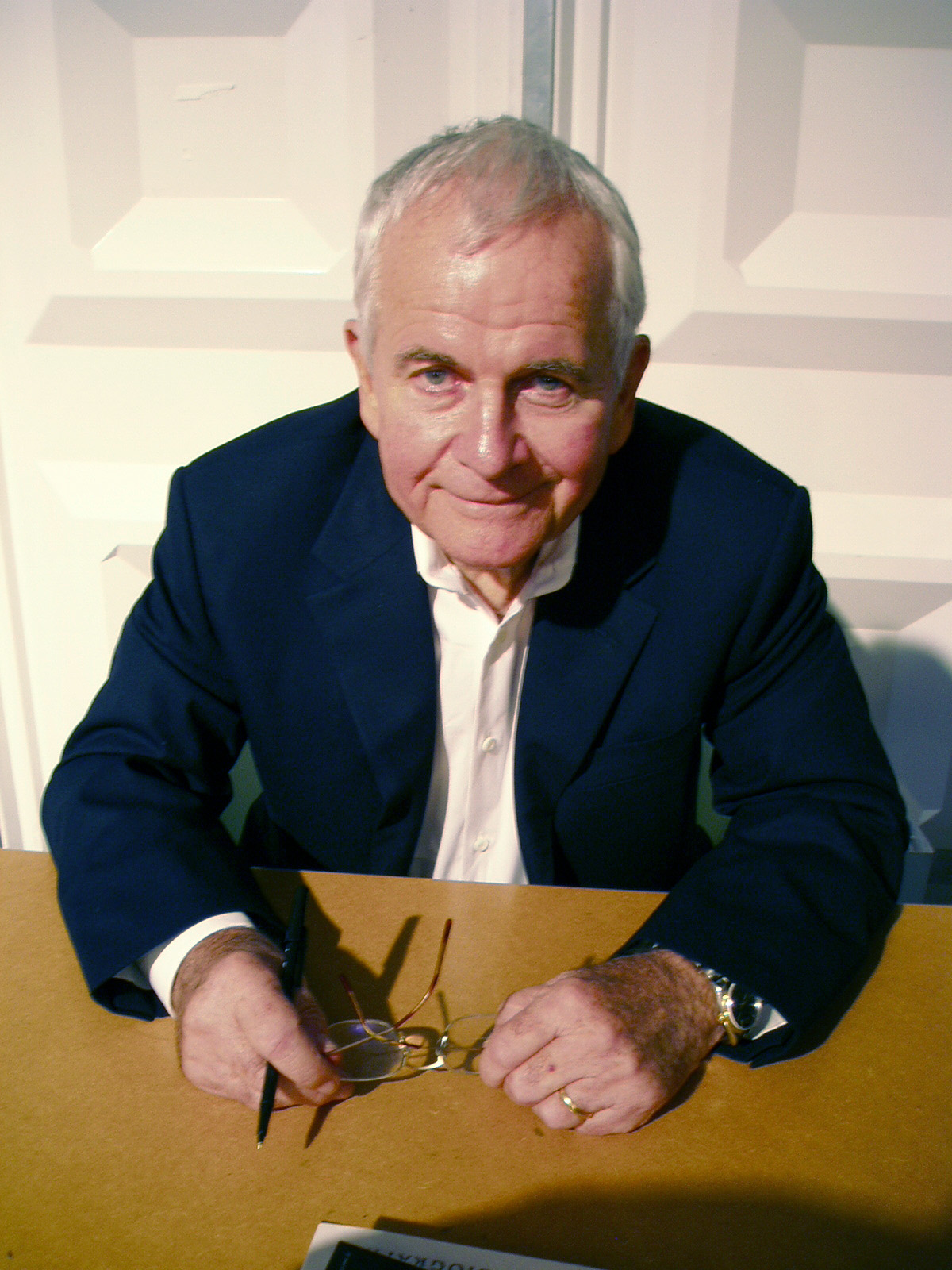
The year also saw the death of Sir Ian Holm.

This article lists feature-length British films and full-length documentaries that have their premiere in 2020 and were at least partly produced by Great Britain or the United Kingdom. It does not feature short films, medium-length films, made-for-TV films, pornographic films, filmed theater, VR films, and interactive films. It also does not include films screened in previous years that had official release dates in 2020.

Due to the COVID-19 pandemic, many British films were delayed from release and premiere including No Time to Die, Stardust, Blithe Spirit, A Boy Called Christmas and Everybody's Talking About Jamie.

== Film premieres ==
=== January–March ===
Opening		Title	Cast and crew	Details	Ref.
J A N U A R Y	16	Waiting for Anya	Director: Ben Cookson; Cast: Noah Schnapp, Thomas Kretschmann, Frederick Schmidt, Jean Reno, Anjelica Huston	Vue Cinemas; Based on Waiting for Anya by Michael Morpurgo (Co-produced by Belgium)	
J A N U A R Y	24	Come Away	Director: Brenda Chapman; Cast: Angelina Jolie, David Oyelowo, Gugu Mbatha-Raw, Michael Caine, Derek Jacobi, Jenny Galloway	GEM Entertainment; Based on Alice's Adventures in Wonderland by Lewis Carroll and Peter Pan by J. M. Barrie (Co-produced by the United States)	
J A N U A R Y	24	Dream Horse	Director: Euros Lyn; Cast: Toni Collette, Damian Lewis	Warner Bros. Pictures (Co-produced by the United States)	
J A N U A R Y	24	Herself	Director: Phyllida Lloyd; Cast: Clare Dunne, Harriet Walter, Conleth Hill	Picturehouse Entertainment (Co-produced by Ireland)	
J A N U A R Y	24	The Courier	Director: Dominic Cooke; Cast: Benedict Cumberbatch, Jessie Buckley, Rachel Brosnahan, Angus Wright	Lionsgate; Based on the life of Greville Wynne (Co-produced by the United States)	
J A N U A R Y	24	The Night House	Director: David Bruckner; Cast: Rebecca Hall, Sarah Goldberg, Evan Jonigkeit, Stacy Martin, Vondie Curtis-Hall	Searchlight Pictures (co-produced by the United States)	
J A N U A R Y	24	Never, Rarely, Sometimes, Always	Director: Eliza Hittman; Cast: Sidney Flanigan, Talia Ryder, Théodore Pellerin, Ryan Eggold, Sharon Van Etten	Universal Pictures (Co-produced by the United States)	
J A N U A R Y	25	Possessor	Director: Brandon Cronenberg; Cast: Andrea Riseborough, Christopher Abbott, Rossif Sutherland, Tuppence Middleton, Sean Bean, Jennifer Jason Leigh	Signature Entertainment (Co-produced by the Canada and the United States)	
J A N U A R Y	26	Amulet	Director: Romola Garai; Cast: Carla Juri, Imelda Staunton, Alec Secareanu		
J A N U A R Y	26	The Nest	Director: Sean Durkin; Cast: Jude Law, Carrie Coon, Charlie Shotwell, Oona Roche, Adeel Akhtar	Picturehouse Entertainment (Co-produced by Canada and the United States)	
J A N U A R Y	26	Surge	Director: Aneil Karia; Cast: Ben Whishaw, Ellie Haddington, Ian Gelder, Jasmine Jobson		
J A N U A R Y	27	The Father	Director: Florian Zeller; Cast: Anthony Hopkins, Olivia Colman, Mark Gatiss, Imogen Poots, Rufus Sewell, Olivia Williams	Lionsgate; Based on Le Père by Florian Zeller	
J A N U A R Y	27	His House	Director: Remi Weekes; Cast: Wunmi Mosaku, Sope Dirisu, Matt Smith	Netflix (Co-produced by United States)	
J A N U A R Y	27	The Last Thing He Wanted	Director: Dee Rees; Cast: Anne Hathaway, Willem Dafoe, Ben Affleck, Toby Jones, Rosie Perez	Netflix; Based on The Last Thing He Wanted by Joan Didion (Co-produced by United States)	
J A N U A R Y	27	Luxor	Director: Zeina Durra; Cast: Andrea Riseborough, Janie Aziz, Shahira Fahmy	(Co-produced by Egypt)	
J A N U A R Y	31	Falling	Director: Viggo Mortensen; Cast: Viggo Mortensen, Lance Henriksen, Sverrir Gudnason, Laura Linney, Hannah Gross, Terry Chen	GEM Entertainment (Co-produced by Canada and the United States)	
J A N U A R Y	31	The Rhythm Section	Director: Reed Morano; Cast: Blake Lively, Jude Law, Sterling K. Brown	Paramount Pictures; Based on The Rhythm Section by Mark Burnell (Co-produced by the United States)	
F E B R U A R Y	14	Emma.	Director: Autumn de Wilde; Cast: Anya Taylor-Joy, Johnny Flynn, Josh O'Connor, Callum Turner, Mia Goth, Miranda Hart, Bill Nighy	Focus Features; Based on Emma by Jane Austen (Co-produced by the United States)	
F E B R U A R Y	21	Mogul Mowgli	Director: Bassam Tariq; Cast: Riz Ahmed, Alyy Khan, Sudha Bhuchar, Nabhaan Rizwan, Anjana Vasan	Focus Features (Co-produced by the United States)	
F E B R U A R Y	21	The Works and Days (of Tayoko Shiojiri in the Shiotani Basin)	Anders Edström, C.W. Winter	Silver Salt Films	
F E B R U A R Y	26	DAU. Natasha	Directors: Ilya Khrzhanovsky, Jekaterina Oertel; Cast: Natalia Berezhnaya, Olga Shkabarnya, Vladimir Azhippo, Alexei Blinov	(Co-produced by Germany, Russia and Ukraine)	
F E B R U A R Y	26	The Roads Not Taken	Director: Sally Potter; Cast: Javier Bardem, Elle Fanning, Salma Hayek	Focus Features (Co-produced by Sweden and the United States)	
M A R C H	1	Escape from Pretoria	Director: Francis Annan; Cast: Daniel Radcliffe, Daniel Webber, Ian Hart, Mark Leonard Winter, Nathan Page	Based on Inside Out: Escape from Pretoria Central Prison by Tim Jenkin (Co-produced by Australia)	
M A R C H	8	Resistance	Director: Jonathan Jakubowicz; Cast: Jesse Eisenberg, Ed Harris, Clémence Poésy, Matthias Schweighöfer, Félix Moati, Karl Markovics, Vica Kerekes, Bella Ramsey, Édgar Ramírez	Based on Marcel Marceau (Co-produced by Germany and United States)	
M A R C H	13	Misbehaviour	Director: Philippa Lowthorpe; Cast: Keira Knightley, Gugu Mbatha-Raw, Emma Corrin, Suki Waterhouse, Jessie Buckley, Lesley Manville, Greg Kinnear, Keeley Hawes, Rhys Ifans, Phyllis Logan	Based on the 1970 Miss World competition Pathé	

=== April–June ===
Opening		Title	Cast and crew	Details	Ref.
A P R I L	3	Four Kids and It	Director: Andy De Emmony; Cast: Paula Patton, Matthew Goode, Billy Jenkins, Ashley Aufderheide, Teddie-Rose Malleson-Allen, Ellie-Mae Siame, Russell Brand, Michael Caine	Altitude; Based on Four Children and It by Jacqueline Wilson	
A P R I L	10	Love Wedding Repeat	Director: Dean Craig; Cast: Olivia Munn, Sam Claflin, Freida Pinto, Eleanor Tomlinson	Netflix; Remake of Plan de table (Co-produced by the United States)	
M A Y	22	The Trip to Greece	Director: Michael Winterbottom; Cast: Rob Brydon, Steve Coogan	Based on The Trip and sequel to The Trip to Spain	
J U N E					

=== July–September ===
Opening		Title	Cast and crew	Details	Ref.
J U L Y	8	23 Walks	Director: Paul Morrison; Cast: Alison Steadman, Dave Johns, Graham Cole		m
J U L Y	30	Host	Director: Rob Savage; Cast: Haley Bishop, Jemma Moore, Emma Louise Webb, Radina Drandova, Caroline Ward, Teddy Linard, Seylan Baxter	Vertigo Releasing	
J U L Y	31	Summerland	Director: Jessica Swale; Cast: Gemma Arterton, Gugu Mbatha-Raw, Penelope Wilton, Tom Courtenay	Lionsgate	
A U G U S T	7	The Secret Garden	Director: Marc Munden; Cast: Colin Firth, Julie Walters, Dixie Egerickx, Edan Hayhurst, Amir Wilson	StudioCanal; Based on "The Secret Garden" by Frances Hodgson Burnett	
A U G U S T	26	Tenet	Director: Christopher Nolan; Cast: John David Washington, Robert Pattinson, Elizabeth Debicki, Dimple Kapadia, Martin Donovan, Fiona Dourif, Yuri Kolokolnikov, Himesh Patel, Clémence Poésy, Aaron Taylor-Johnson, Michael Caine, Kenneth Branagh	Warner Bros. Pictures (Co-produced by United Kingdom)	
S E P T E M B E R	2	The Owners	Director: Julius Berg; Cast: Maisie Williams, Sylvester McCoy, Rita Tushingham, Jake Curran	Signature Entertainment; Une Nuit de Plene Lune by Hermann & Yves H. (Co-produced by France and United States)	
S E P T E M B E R	4	The Duke	Director: Roger Michell; Cast: Jim Broadbent, Helen Mirren, Fionn Whitehead, Anna Maxwell Martin, Matthew Goode	Signature Entertainment; Based on the theft of Portrait of the Duke of Wellington	
S E P T E M B E R	11	Ammonite	Director: Francis Lee; Cast: Kate Winslet, Saoirse Ronan, Gemma Jones, James McArdle, Alec Secăreanu, Fiona Shaw	Lionsgate	
S E P T E M B E R	11	Monday	Director: Argyris Papadimitropoulos; Cast: Sebastian Stan, Denise Gough, Dominique Tipper, Vangelis Mourikis	(Co-produced by Greece and United States)	
S E P T E M B E R	12	Wolfwalkers	Directors: Tomm Moore, Ross Stewart; Cast: Honor Kneafsey, Eva Whittaker, Sean Bean, Simon McBurney, Tommy Tiernan, Jon Kenny	Wildcard and Apple TV+ (Co-produced by Ireland, Luxembourg, United States, France)	
S E P T E M B E R	12	Bruised	Director: Halle Berry; Cast: Halle Berry, Shamier Anderson, Adan Canto, Sheila Atim, Valentina Shevchenko, Stephen McKinley Henderson	Netflix (co-produced by the United States)	
S E P T E M B E R	12	Limbo	Director: Ben Sharrock; Cast: Sidse Babett Knudsen, Kenneth Collard, Amir El-Masry		
S E P T E M B E R	16	Widlfire	Directors: Cathy Brady; Cast: Danika McGuigan, Nora-Jane Noone, Martin McCann, Kate Dickie	Modern Films (Co-produced by Ireland)	
S E P T E M B E R	23	Enola Holmes	Director: Harry Bradbeer; Cast: Millie Bobby Brown, Henry Cavill, Sam Claflin, Adeel Akhtar, Fiona Shaw, Frances de la Tour, Louis Partridge, Susie Wokoma, Helena Bonham Carter	Netflix; Based on The Enola Holmes Mysteries by Nancy Springer (Co-produced by the United States)	
S E P T E M B E R	25	Six Minutes to Midnight	Director: Andy Goddard; Cast: Judi Dench, Eddie Izzard, James D'Arcy, Jim Broadbent	Lionsgate	
S E P T E M B E R	28	David Attenborough: A Life on Our Planet	Narrator: David Attenborough	Netflix	

=== October–December ===
Opening		Title	Cast and crew	Details	Ref.
O C T O B E R	8	Blithe Spirit	Director: Edward Hall; Cast: Dan Stevens, Leslie Mann, Isla Fisher, Judi Dench	StudioCanal; Based on Blithe Spirit by Noël Coward (Co-produced by the United States)	
O C T O B E R	12	The Banishing	Director: Christopher Smith; Cast: Jessica Brown Findlay, John Heffernan, John Lynch, Sean Harris	Vertigo Releasing	
O C T O B E R	12	The Show	Director: Mitch Jenkins; Cast: Tom Burke, Siobhan Hewlett, Alan Moore, Ellie Bamber, Darrell D'Silva, Christopher Fairbank	Altitude Film Distribution	
O C T O B E R	16	Rebecca	Director: Ben Wheatley; Cast: Lily James, Armie Hammer, Kristin Scott Thomas, Keeley Hawes, Ann Dowd, Sam Riley	Netflix; Based on Rebecca by Daphne du Maurier (Co-produced by United States)	
O C T O B E R	16	Stardust	Director: Gabriel Range; Cast: Johnny Flynn, Jena Malone, Marc Maron	(Co-produced by Canada)	
O C T O B E R	17	Sisters With Transistors	Director: Lisa Rovner	Metrograph Pictures; Documentary about the pioneering women of electronic music	
O C T O B E R	23	Pixie	Director: Barnaby Thompson; Cast: Olivia Cooke, Ben Hardy, Daryl McCormack, Colm Meaney, Alec Baldwin	Paramount Pictures	=
N O V E M B E R	20	A Christmas Carol	Director: Jacqui Morris; Cast: Simon Russell Beale, Carey Mulligan, Martin Freeman, Daniel Kaluuya, Andy Serkis, Leslie Caron	Based on A Christmas Carol by Charles Dickens	
N O V E M B E R	27	Black Beauty	Director: Ashley Avis; Cast: Mackenzie Foy, Claire Forlani, Iain Glen, Fern Deacon	Disney+ Based on Black Beauty by Anna Sewell	
D E C E M B E R	27	Death to 2020	Directors: Al Campbell, Alice Mathias; Cast: Samuel L. Jackson, Hugh Grant, Lisa Kudrow, Leslie Jones, Joe Keery, Kumail Nanjiani, Tracey Ullman, Cristin Milioti, Diane Morgan, Samson Kayo, Laurence Fishburne	Netflix	

=== Other premieres ===
Title	Director	Release date	Ref.
After Love	Aleem Khan	11 September 2020 (Toronto International Film Festival)	
Amber and Me	Ian Davies	21 March 2020	
Be Water	Bao Nguyen	25 January 2020 (Sundance Film Festival)	
Body of Water	Lucy Brydon	27 February 2020 (Glasgow Film Festival)	
Boys from County Hell	Chris Baugh	April 2020 (Tribeca Film Festival)	
Burning Man: Art on Fire	Gerald Fox	15 August 2020	
Climbing Blind	Alastair Lee	20 March 2020	
Coded Bias	Shalini Kantayya	30 January 2020 (Sundance Film Festival)	
DAU. Degeneration	Ilya Khrzhanovsky, Jekaterina Oertel	28 February 2020 (Berlin International Film Festival)	
Edge of Extinction	Andrew Gilbert	18 May 2020	
Enemy Lines	Anders Banke	23 April 2020	
Get Luke Lowe	Drew V Marjke	22 August 2020 (American Black Film Festival)	
How to Stop a Recurring Dream	Ed Morris	27 August 2020 (Loudoun Arts Film Festival)	
I Am Vengeance: Retaliation	Ross Boyask	19 June 2020	
Love Sarah	Eliza Schroeder	29 February 2020 (Glasgow Film Festival)	
One Man and His Shoes	Yemi Bamiro		
The Reason I Jump	Jerry Rothwell	25 January 2020 (Sundance Film Festival)	
Rockfield: The Studio on the Farm	Hannah Berryman	16 March 2020 (South by Southwest)	
Sulphur and White	Julian Jarrold	27 February 2020 (London Royal Gala)	
To Nowhere	Sian Astor-Lewis	7 December 7, 2020 (Paris Independent Film Festival)	
The Uncertain Kingdom	Jason Bradbury, Stroma Cairns, Antonia Campbell-Hughes, Hope Dickson Leach, Ellen Evans, Paul Frankl, Alison Hargreaves, Guy Jenkin, Sophie King, Iggy Ldn, Rebecca Lloyd-Evans, Lanre Malaolu, Runyararo Mapfumo, Lab Ky Mo, Leon Oldstrong, Ray Panthaki, David Proud, Carol Salter, Jason Wingard	3 April 2020 (limited)	
United Nation Three Decades of Drum & Bass	Terry Stone, Richard Turner	21 February 2020	
Villain	Philip Barantini	28 February 2020	
The Whalebone Box	Andrew Kötting	3 April 2020	

=== Culturally British films ===
The following list comprises films not produced by Great Britain or the United Kingdom but is strongly associated with British culture. The films in this list should fulfill at least three of the following criteria:

- The film is adapted from a British source material.
- The story is at least partially set in the United Kingdom.
- The film was at least partially shot in the United Kingdom.
- Many of the film's cast and crew members are British.

Title	Country of origin	Adaptation	Story Setting	Film Locations	British Cast and Crew
Artemis Fowl	United States			England and Northern Ireland, United Kingdom	Kenneth Branagh (director), Nonso Anozie, Judi Dench, Patrick Doyle (composer), Martin Walsh (editor)
Dolittle	United States	Doctor Dolittle by Hugh Lofting	England	Anglesey, Berkshire, Cumbria, Hertfordshire, Middlesex, North Yorkshire, Oxfordshire, and Somerset in United Kingdom	Michael Sheen, Jim Broadbent, Ralph Ineson, Carmen Ejogo, Tom Holland, Craig Robinson, Emma Thompson, Nick Moore (editor)
The Witches	United States; Mexico	The Witches by Roald Dahl		Hertfordshire and Surrey, United Kingdom	Codie-Lei Eastick, Simon Manyonda, Charles Edwards

== British winners ==
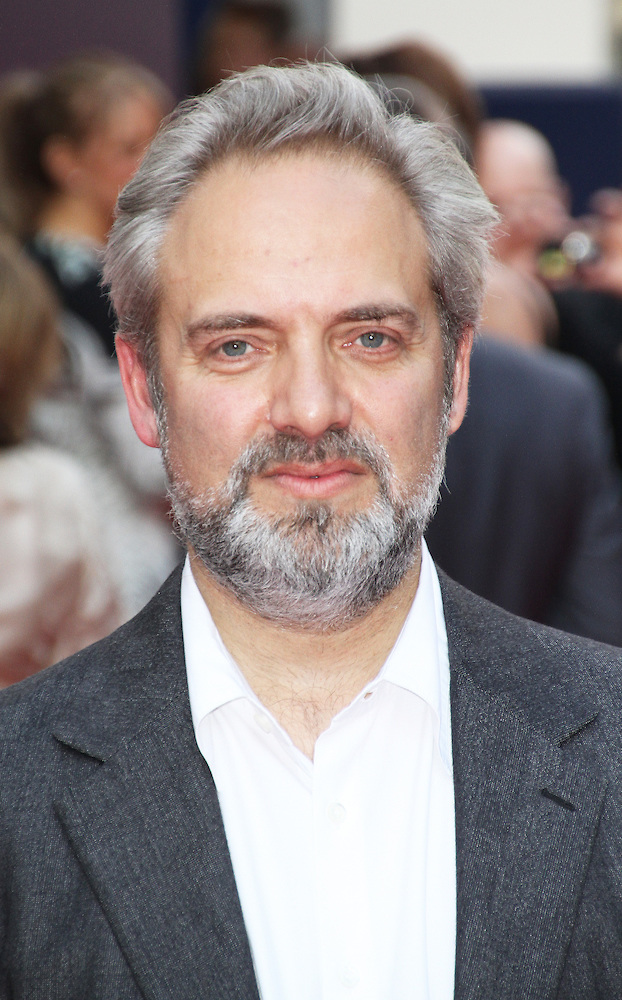
Sam Mendes received multiple awards and nominations for his direction and writing of 1917.

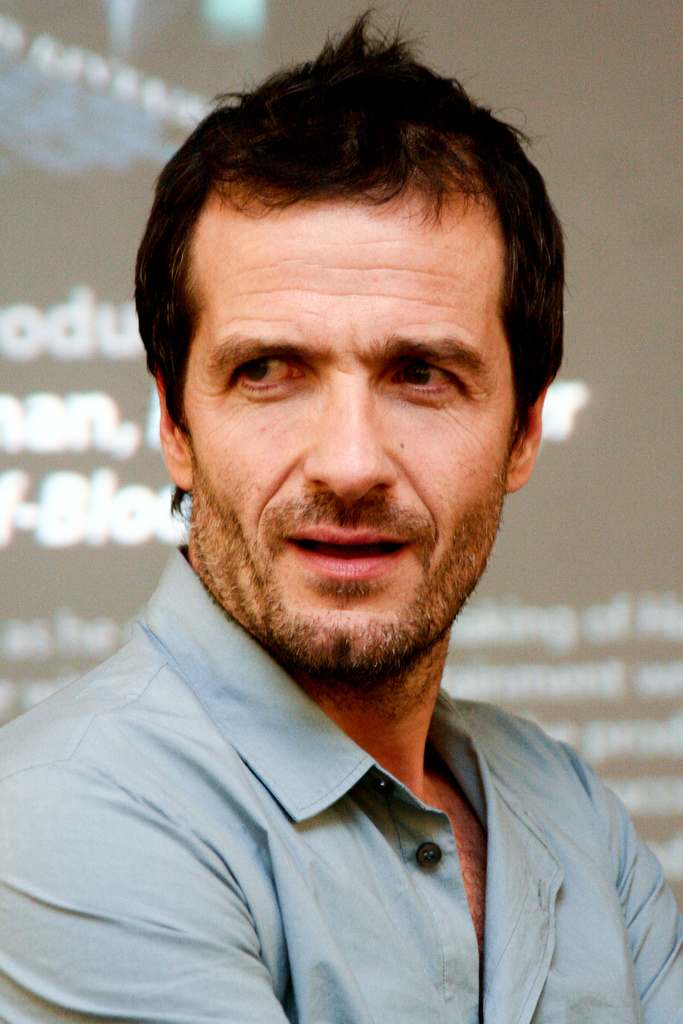
David Heyman received multiple nominations for producing Marriage Story and Once Upon a Time in Hollywood, both of which went on to win several awards in major award ceremonies.

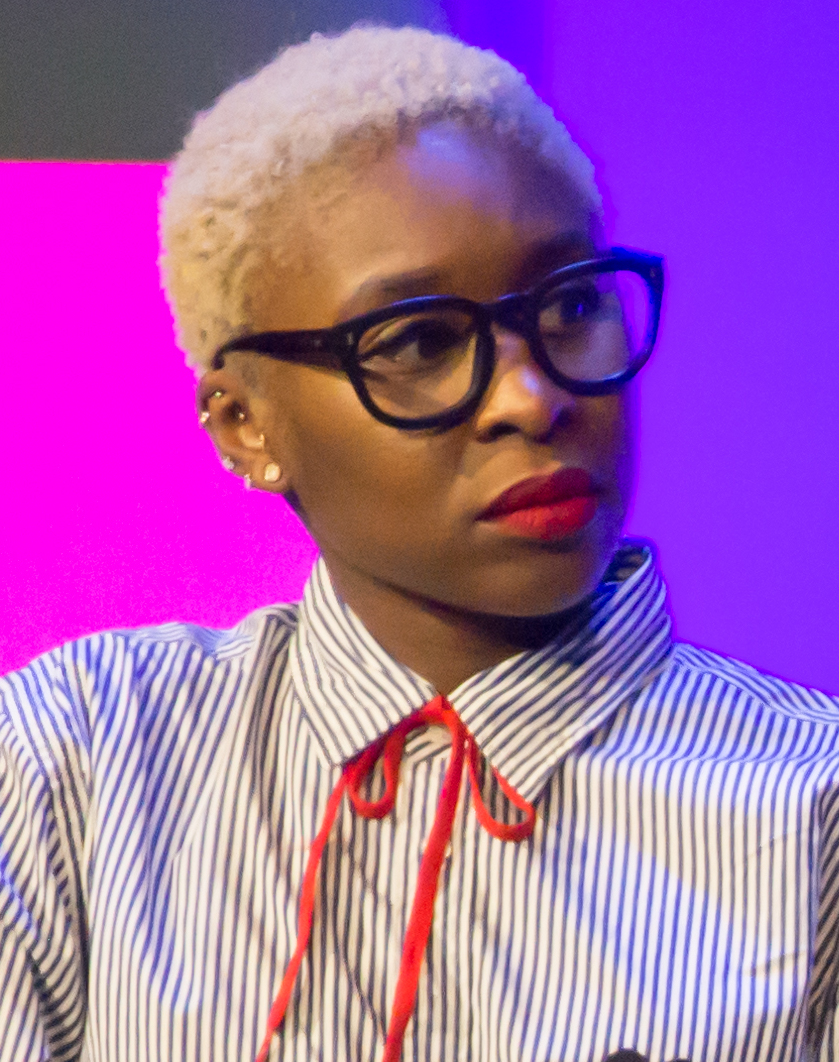
Cynthia Erivo received multiple Best Actress nominations for her performance in Harriet. She was also nominated for Best Song for the song Stand Up from the same film.

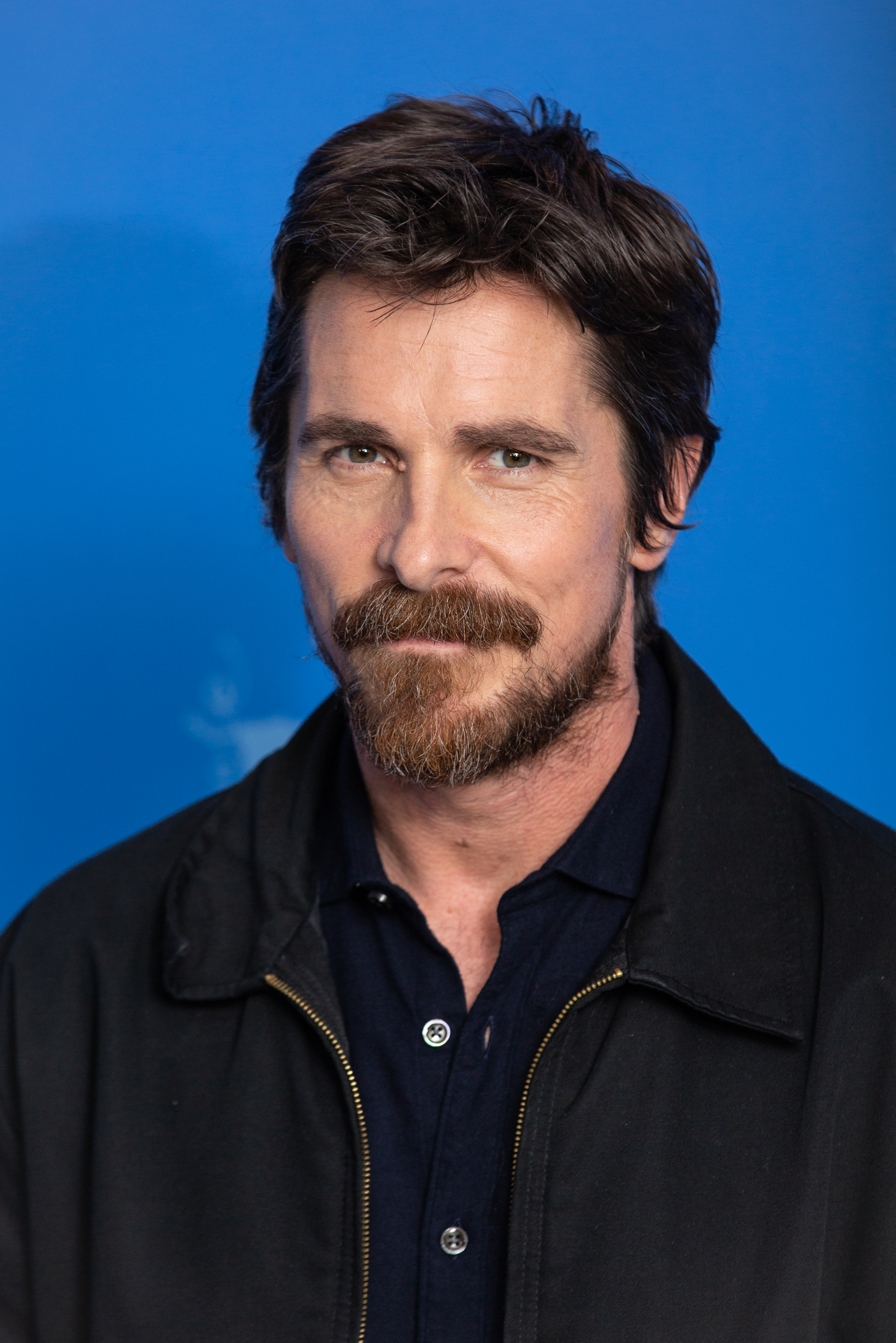
Christian Bale received multiple Best Actor nominations for his performance in Le Mans '66.

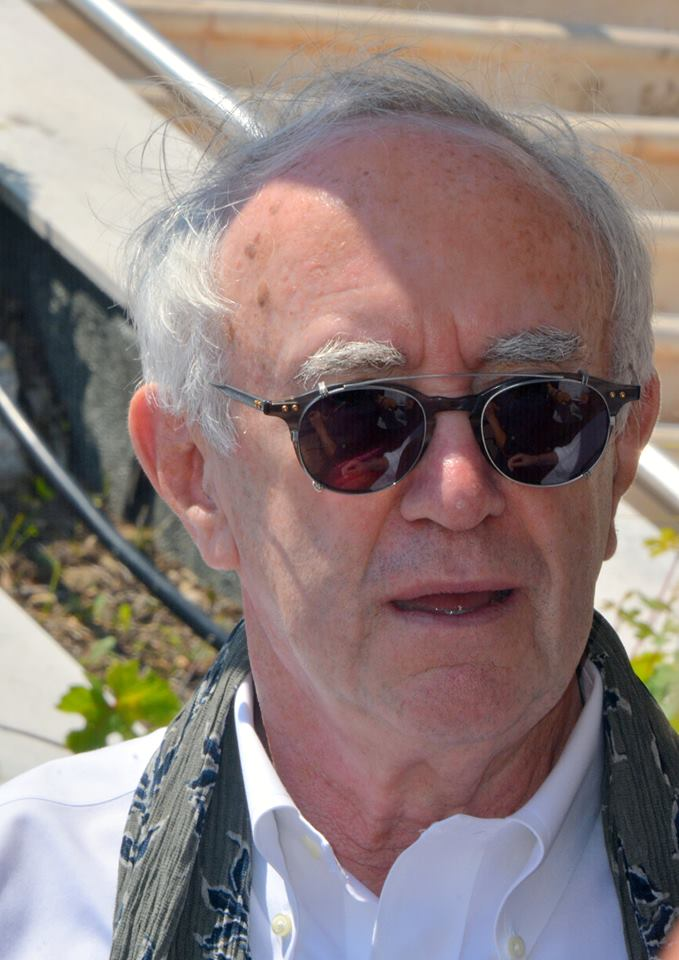
Jonathan Pryce received multiple Best Actor nominations for his portrayal of Pope Francis in The Two Popes.

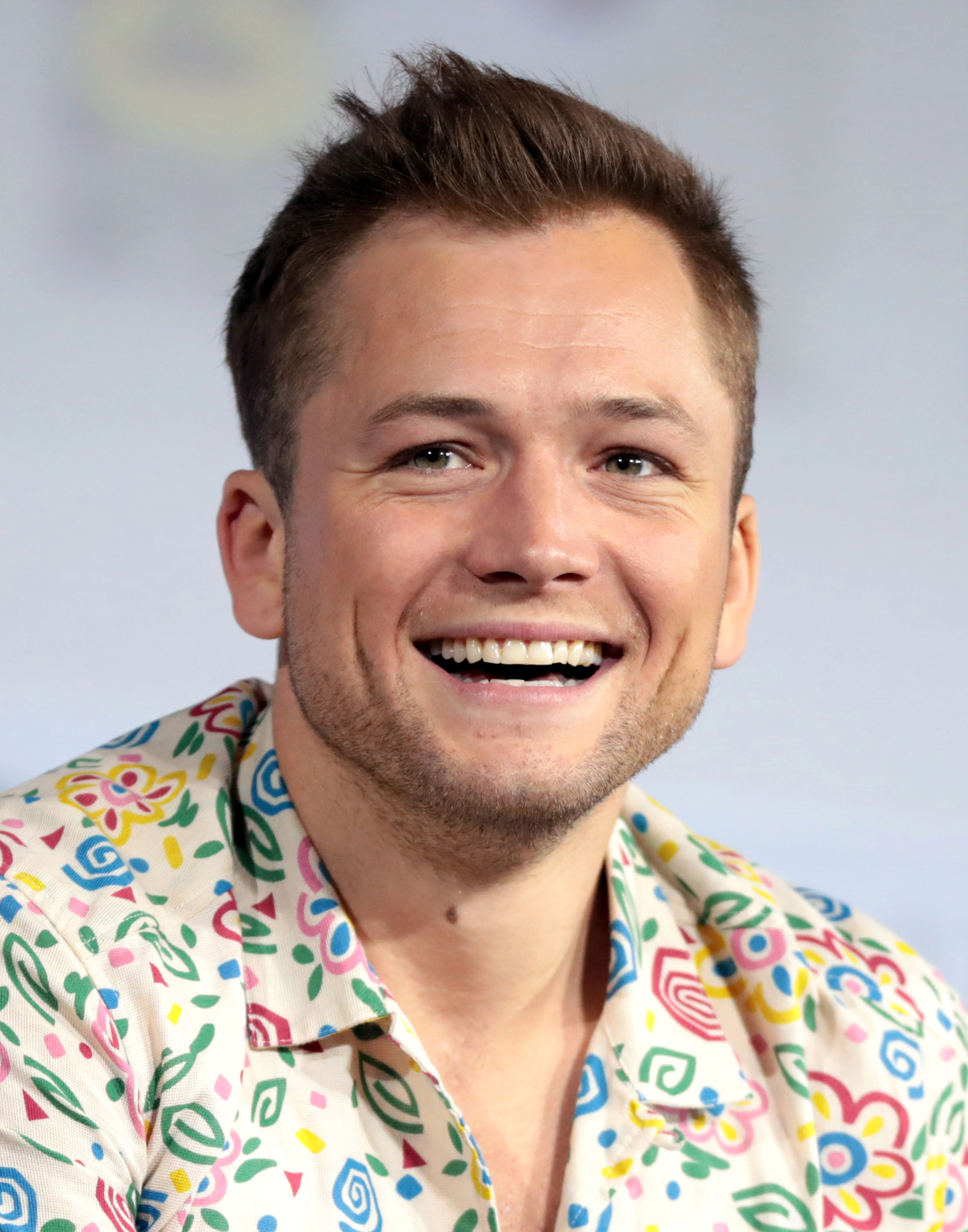
Taron Egerton received the Golden Globe award and multiple Best Actor nominations for his portrayal of Elton John in Rocketman.

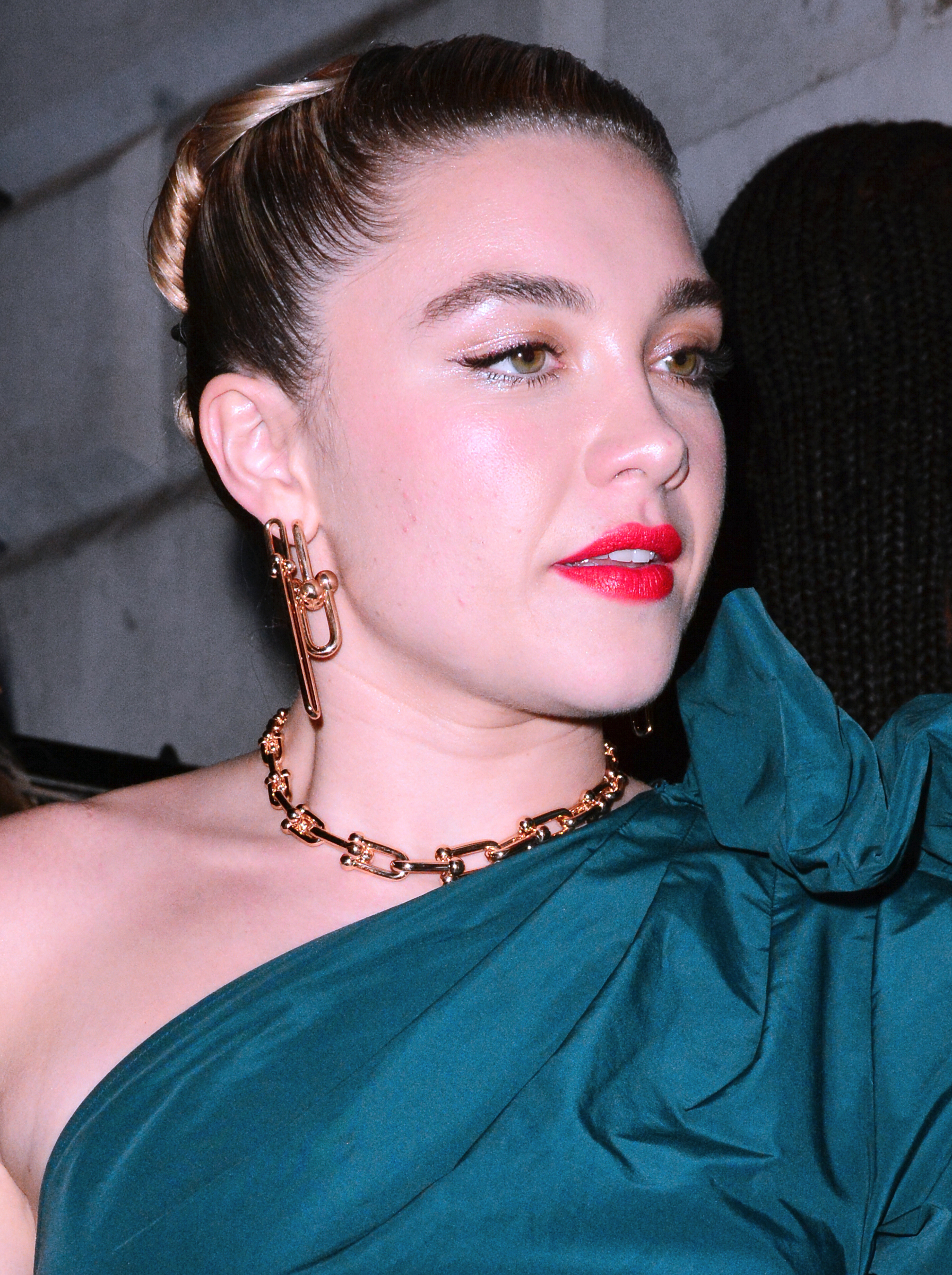
Florence Pugh garnered critical acclaim and multiple nominations for her supporting performance in Little Women. She also gained critical acclaim for her lead performance in Midsommar the same year.

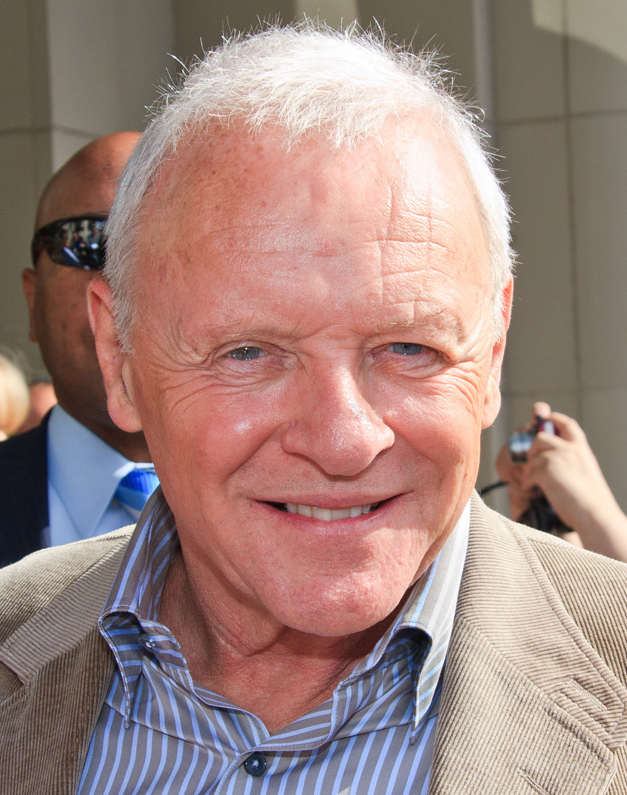
Anthony Hopkins received multiple nominations for his supporting turn in The Two Popes.

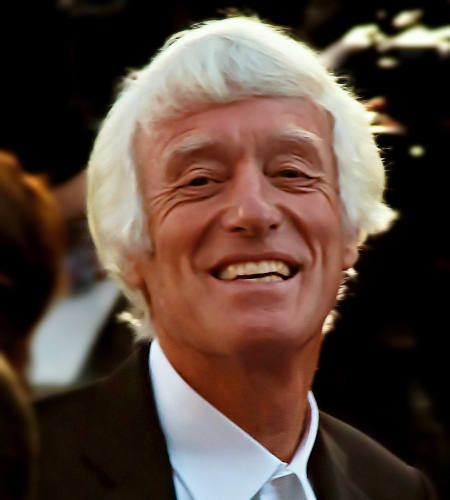
Roger Deakins received multiple Best Cinematography awards for his work in 1917.

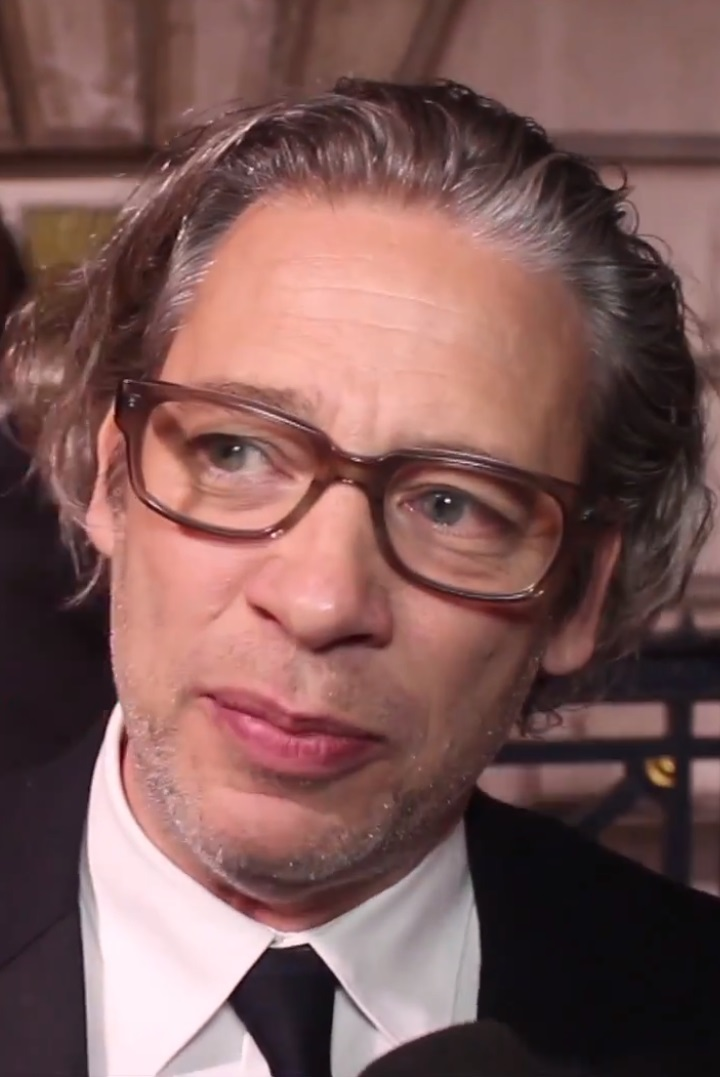
Dexter Fletcher was nominated for the BAFTA award for Outstanding British Film for directing Rocketman.

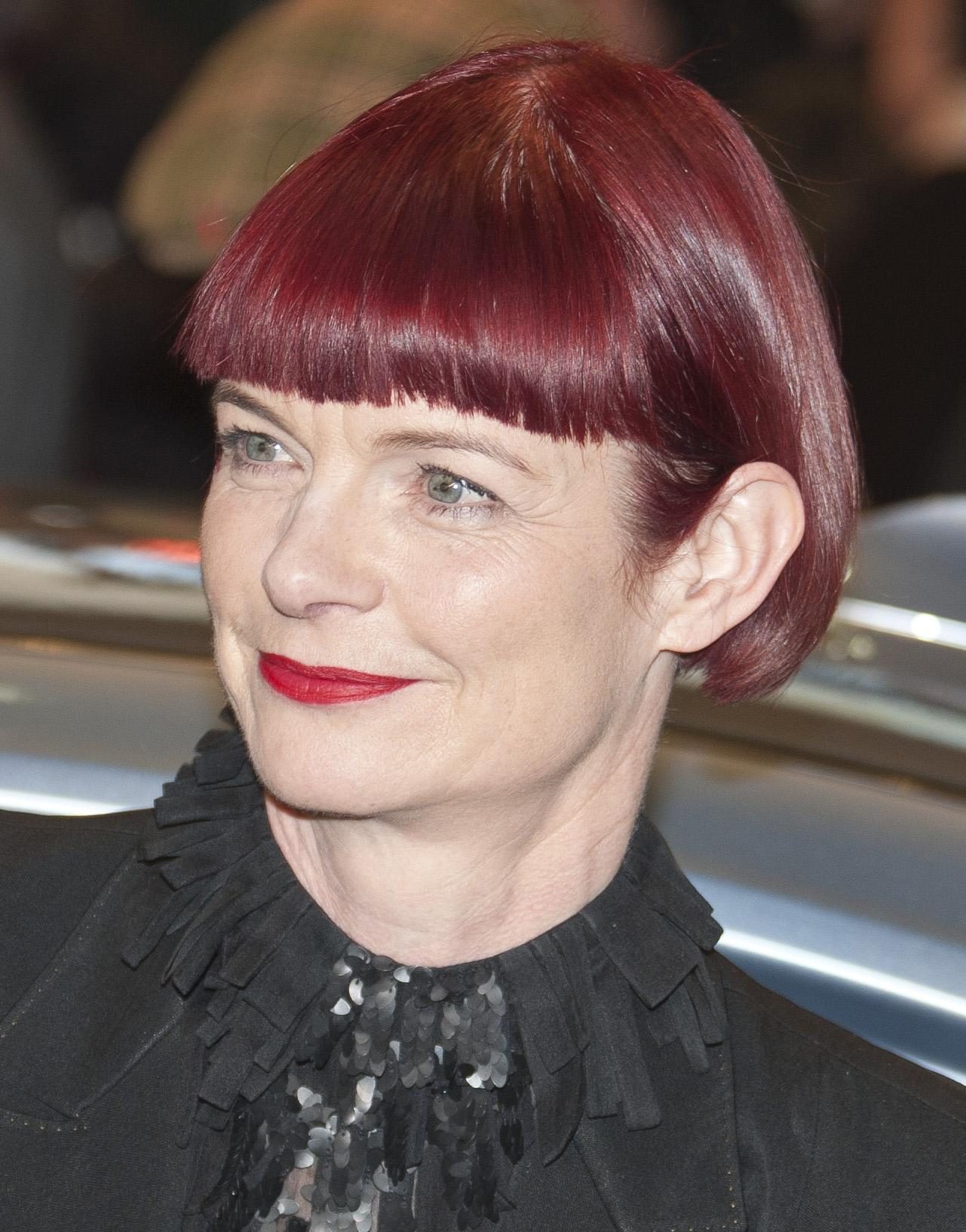
Sandy Powell received multiple Best Costume nominations for The Irishman along with Christopher Peterson.

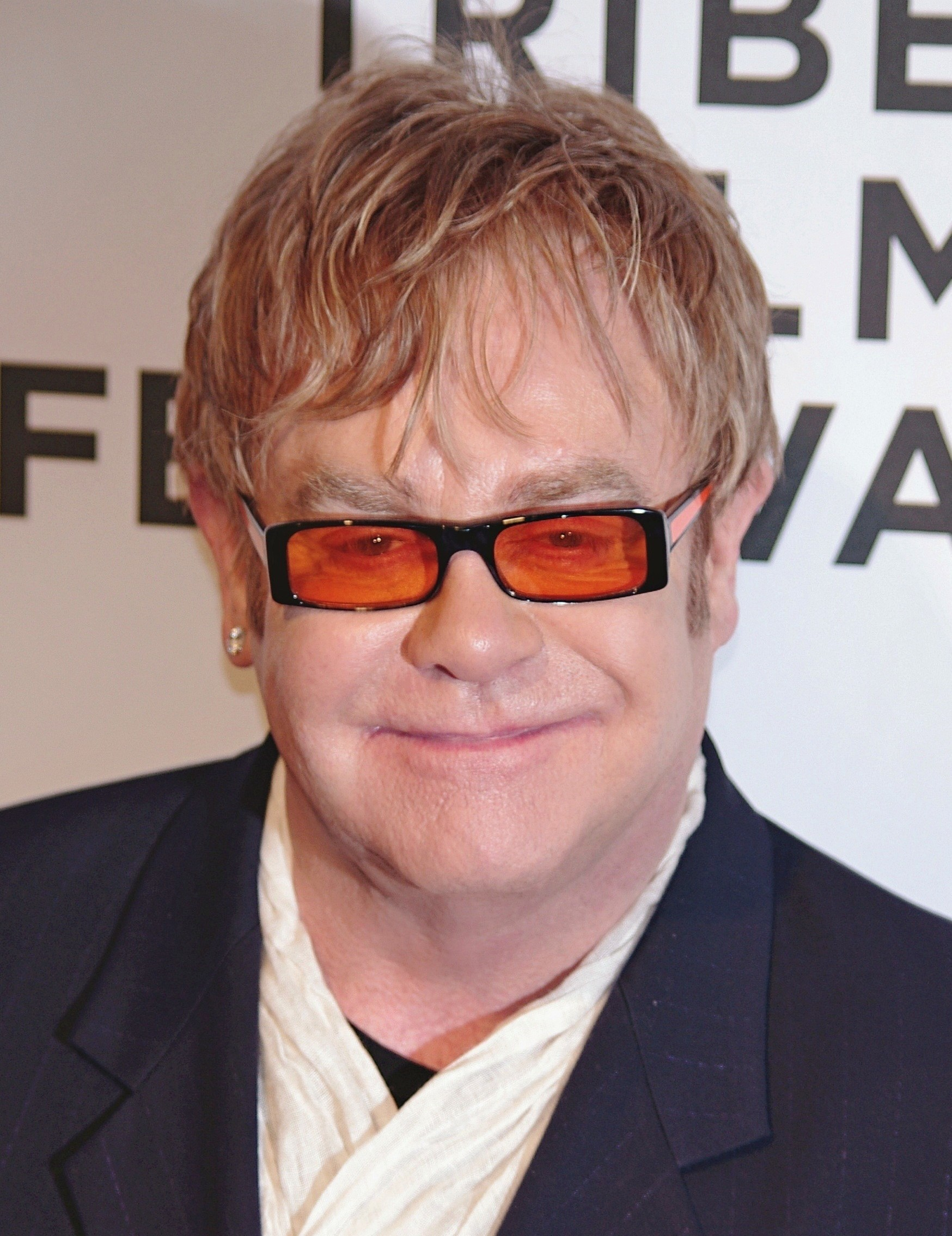
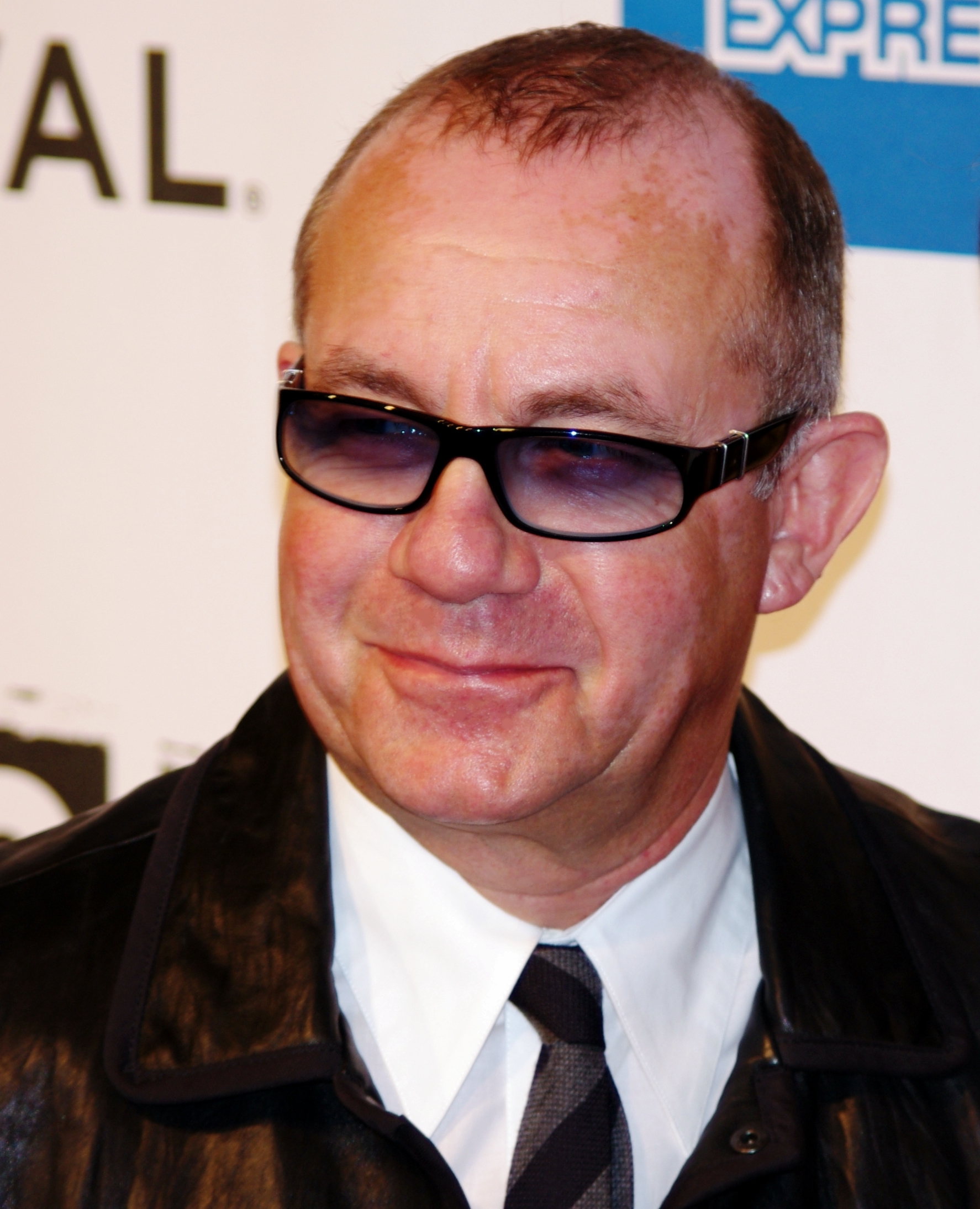
Elton John and Bernie Taupin received the Academy award and the Golden Globe for their song (I'm Gonna) Love Me Again for the film Rocketman.

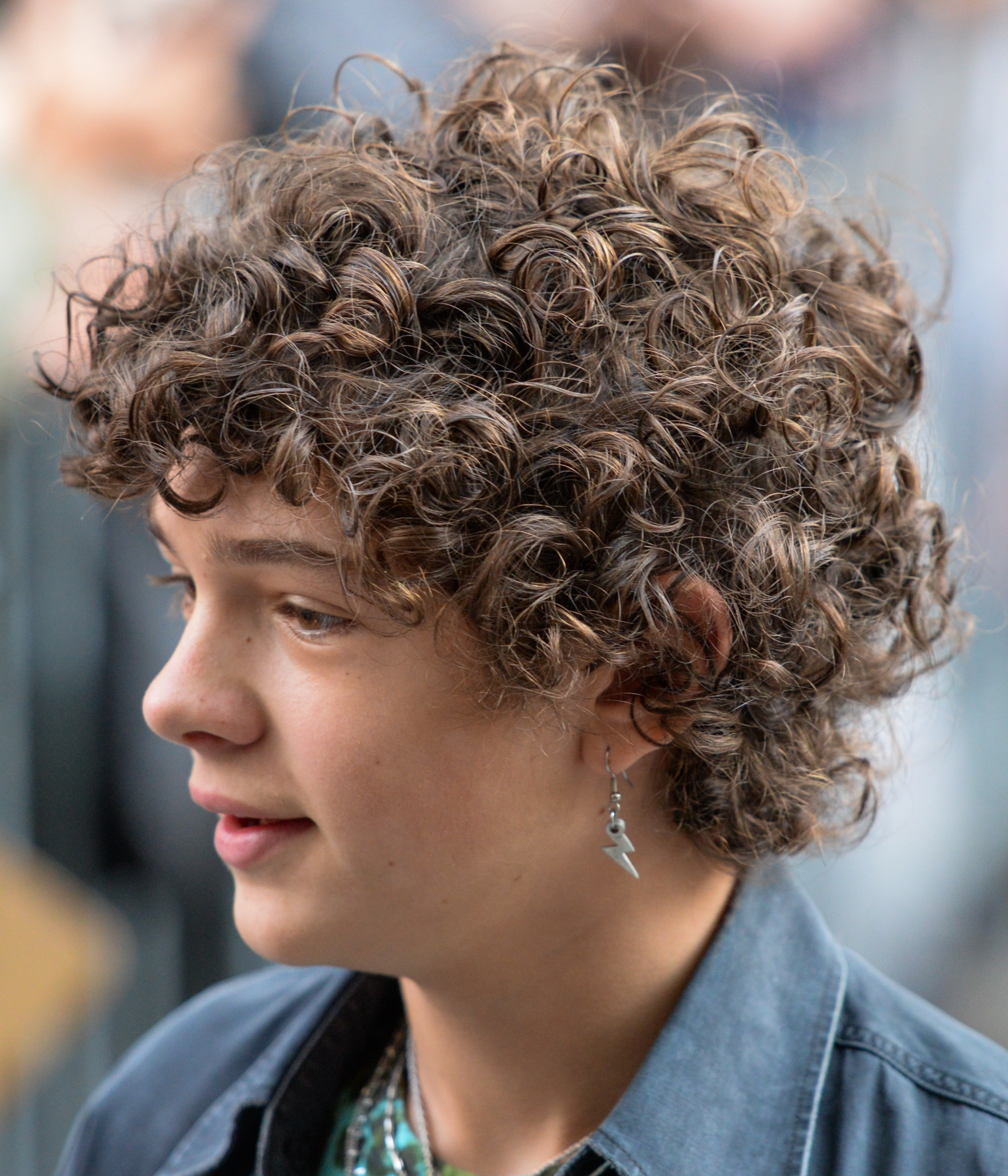
Noah Jupe garnered acclaim and the Critic's Choice Best Young Actor nomination for his work in Honey Boy.

Listed here are the British nominees at the five most prestigious film award ceremonies in the English-speaking world: the Academy Awards, British Academy Film Awards, Critics' Choice Awards, Golden Globe Awards, and Screen Actors Guild Awards, that were held during 2020, celebrating the best films of 2019. The British nominations were led by 1917 along with Once Upon a Time in Hollywood, which was co-produced by the United States. 1917 led in the technical categories with multiple wins in cinematography, sound, special effects, and production design. Notably, a number of British technicians were nominated for non-British films such as Le Mans '66, Star Wars: The Rise of Skywalker, and Ad Astra. Marriage Story and Once Upon a Time in Hollywood, both British-American co-productions, unanimously won the Best Supporting Actress and Actor awards respectively. British films did, however, notably lose out to Parasite from South Korea.

=== Academy Awards ===
The 92nd Academy Awards honoring the best films of 2019 were held on 9 February 2020.

British winners:

- 1917 (Best Cinematography, Best Sound Mixing, Best Visual Effects)
- Judy (Best Actress)
- Marriage Story (Best Supporting Actress)
- Once Upon a Time in Hollywood (Best Supporting Actor, Best Production Design)
- Rocketman (Best Original Song)
- Bernie Taupin (Best Original Song) – "(I'm Gonna) Love Me Again" (Rocketman)
- Elton John (Best Original Song) – "(I'm Gonna) Love Me Again" (Rocketman)
- Jacqueline Durran (Best Costume Design) – Little Women
- Mark Taylor (Best Sound Mixing) – 1917
- Roger Deakins (Best Cinematography) – 1917
- Stuart Wilson (Best Sound Mixing) – 1917
- Learning to Skateboard in a Warzone (If You're a Girl) (Best Documentary Feature (Short Subject) )
- Elena Andreicheva (Best Documentary Feature (Short Subject)) – Learning to Skateboard in a Warzone (If You're a Girl)

British nominees:

- 1917 (Best Picture, Best Director, Best Original Screenplay, Best Sound Editing, Best Production Design, Best Original Score, Best Makeup and Hair)
- For Sama (Best Documentary)
- Judy (Best Makeup and Hair)
- Marriage Story (Best Picture, Best Actor, Best Actress, Best Original Screenplay, Best Original Score)
- Once Upon a Time in Hollywood (Best Picture, Best Actor, Best Director, Best Original Screenplay, Best Cinematography, Best Sound Editing, Best Sound Mixing, Best Costume Design)
- The Two Popes (Best Actor, Best Supporting Actor, Best Adapted Screenplay)
- Andy Nelson (Best Sound) – Star Wars: The Rise of Skywalker
- Anthony Hopkins (Best Supporting Actor) – The Two Popes
- Callum McDougall (Best Picture) – 1917
- Christopher Peterson (Best Costume Design) – The Irishman
- Cynthia Erivo (Best Actress, Best Original Song) – Harriet, "Stand Up" (Harriet)
- David Heyman (Best Picture) – Marriage Story, Once Upon a Time in Hollywood
- Edward Watts (Best Documentary) – For Sama
- Florence Pugh (Best Supporting Actress) – Little Women
- Jayne-Ann Tenggren (Best Picture) – 1917
- Jeremy Woodhead (Best Make Up & Hair) – Judy
- Jonathan Pryce (Best Actor) – The Two Popes
- Kay Georgiou (Best Make Up & Hair) – Joker
- Krysty Wilson-Cairns (Best Original Screenplay) – 1917
- Lee Sandales (Best Production Design) – 1917
- Naomi Donne (Best Make Up & Hair) – 1917
- Neal Scanlan (Best Visual Effects) – Star Wars: The Rise of Skywalker
- Oliver Tarney (Best Sound Editing) – 1917
- Paul Massey (Best Sound Mixing) – Le Mans '66
- Pippa Harris (Best Picture) – 1917
- Rachael Tate (Best Sound Editing) – 1917
- Roger Guyett (Best Visual Effects) – Star Wars: The Rise of Skywalker
- Sam Mendes (Best Director, Best Original Screenplay) – 1917
- Sandy Powell (Best Costume Design) – The Irishman
- Tom Johnson (Best Sound Mixing) – Ad Astra

=== British Academy Film Awards ===
The 73rd British Academy Film Awards was presented on 2 February 2020.

British winners:

- 1917 (Best Film, Outstanding British Film, Best Director, Best Original Score, Best Sound, Best Cinematography, Best Production Design, Best Make Up & Hair, Best Special Visual Effects)
- Bait (Outstanding Debut by a British Writer, Director or Producer)
- For Sama (Best Documentary)
- Judy (Best Leading Actress)
- Marriage Story (Best Supporting Actress)
- Once Upon a Time in Hollywood (Best Supporting Actor)
- Andy Serkis (Outstanding British contribution to cinema)
- Callum McDougall (Best Film, Outstanding British Film) – 1917
- Jayne-Ann Tenggren (Best Film, Outstanding British Film) – 1917
- Kate Byers (Outstanding Debut by a British Writer, Director or Producer) – Bait
- Lee Sandales (Best Production Design) – 1917
- Linn Waite (Outstanding Debut by a British Writer, Director or Producer) – Bait
- Mark Jenkin (Outstanding British Film, Outstanding Debut by a British Writer, Director or Producer) – Bait
- Mark Taylor (Best Sound) – 1917
- Micheal Ward (EE Rising Star Award)
- Naomi Donne (Best Make Up & Hair) – 1917
- Oliver Tarney (Best Sound Editing) – 1917
- Pippa Harris (Best Film, Outstanding British Film) – 1917
- Rachael Tate (Best Sound) – 1917
- Sam Mendes (Best Film, Outstanding British Film, Best Director) – 1917
- Roger Deakins (Best Cinematography) – 1917
- Stuart Wilson (Best Sound) – 1917
- Granddad Was A Romantic. – Maryam Mohajer (Best British Short Animation)
- Learning to Skateboard in a Warzone (If You're a Girl) – Carol Dysinger and Elena Andreicheva (Best British Short Film)

British nominees:

- Bait (Outstanding Debut by a British Writer, Director or Producer)
- Diego Maradona (Best Documentary)
- For Sama (Outstanding British Film, Outstanding Debut by a British Writer, Director or Producer, Best Film Not in the English Language)
- Judy (Best Costume Design, Best Make Up & Hair)
- Maiden (Outstanding Debut by a British Writer, Director or Producer)
- Marriage Story (Best Original Screenplay, Best Leading Actor, Best Leading Actress, Best Casting)
- Once Upon a Time in Hollywood (Best Film, Best Director, Best Leading Actor, Best Supporting Actress, Best Original Screenplay, Best Production Design, Best Costume Design, Best Editing, Best Casting)
- Only You (Outstanding Debut by a British Writer, Director or Producer)
- The Personal History of David Copperfield (Best Casting)
- Rocketman (Outstanding British Film, Best Leading Actor, Best Sound, Best Make Up & Hair)
- A Shaun the Sheep Movie: Farmageddon (Best Animated Film)
- Sorry We Missed You (Outstanding British Film)
- The Two Popes (Outstanding British Film, Best Leading Actor, Best Supporting Actor, Best Adapted Screenplay, Best Casting)
- Wild Rose (Best Leading Actress)
- Adam Bohling (Outstanding British Film) – Rocketman
- Alex Holmes (Outstanding Debut by a British Writer, Director or Producer) – Maiden
- Alvaro Delgado-Aparicio (Outstanding Debut by a British Writer, Director or Producer) – Retablo
- Andy Nelson (Best Sound) – Star Wars: The Rise of Skywalker
- Anthony Hopkins (Best Supporting Actor) – The Two Popes
- Asif Kapadia (Best Documentary) – Diego Maradona
- Christopher Peterson (Best Costume Design) – The Irishman
- Danny Sheehan (Best Sound) – Rocketman
- David Heyman (Best Film) – Once Upon a Time in Hollywood
- David Reid (Outstanding British Film) – Rocketman
- Dexter Fletcher (Outstanding British Film) – Rocketman
- Edward Watts (Outstanding British Film, Outstanding Debut by a British Writer, Director or Producer, Best Film Not in the English Language) – For Sama
- Florence Pugh (Best Supporting Actress) – Little Women
- Harry Wootliff (Outstanding Debut by a British Writer, Director or Producer) – Only You
- Jack Lowden (EE Rising Star Award)
- Jacqueline Durran (Best Costume Design) – Little Women
- Jeremy Woodhead (Best Make Up & Hair) – Judy
- Jonathan Pryce (Best Leading Actor) – The Two Popes
- Julian Day (Best Costume Design) – Rocketman
- Kate Byers (Outstanding British Film) – Bait
- Kay Georgiou (Best Make Up & Hair) – Joker
- Ken Loach (Outstanding British Film) – Sorry We Missed You
- Lee Hall (Outstanding British Film) – Rocketman
- Linn Waite (Outstanding British Film) – Bait
- Lizzie Yianni Georgiou (Best Make Up & Hair) – Rocketman
- Mark Jenkin (Outstanding British Film) – Bait
- Matthew Collinge (Best Sound) – Rocketman
- Matthew Vaughn (Outstanding British Film) – Rocketman
- Mike Prestwood Smith (Best Sound) – Rocketman
- Neal Scanlan (Best Special Visual Effects) – Star Wars: The Rise of Skywalker
- Paul Massey (Best Sound Mixing) – Le Mans '66
- Paul Kavanagh (Best Special Visual Effects) – Star Wars: The Rise of Skywalker
- Rebecca O'Brien (Outstanding British Film) – Sorry We Missed You
- Roger Guyett (Best Special Visual Effects) – Star Wars: The Rise of Skywalker
- Roman Griffin Davis (Best Young Actor/Actress) – Jojo Rabbit
- Sandy Powell (Best Costume Design) – The Irishman
- Sarah Crowe (Best Casting) – The Personal History of David Copperfield
- Stuart Wilson (Best Sound) – Star Wars: The Rise of Skywalker
- Taron Egerton (Best Leading Actor) – Rocketman
- Tracey Seaward (Outstanding British Film) – The Two Popes
- Victoria Thomas (Best Casting) – Once Upon a Time in Hollywood
- Azaar – Myriam Raja and Nathanael Baring (Best British Short Film)
- Goldfish – Hector Dockrill, Harri Kamalanathan, Benedict Turnbull, and Laura Dockrill (Best British Short Film)
- In Her Boots – Kathrin Steinbacher (Best British Short Animation)
- Kamali – Sasha Rainbow and Rosalind Croad (Best British Short Film)
- The Magic Boat – Naaman Azhari and Lilia Laurel (Best British Short Animation)
- The Trap – Lena Headey and Anthony Fitzgerald (Best British Short Film)

=== Critics' Choice Awards ===
The 25th Critics' Choice Awards was presented on 12 January 2020.

British winners:

- 1917 (Best Director, Best Cinematography, Best Editing)
- Judy (Best Actress)
- Marriage Story (Best Supporting Actress)
- Once Upon a Time in Hollywood (Best Picture, Best Supporting Actor, Best Original Screenplay, Best Production Design)
- Rocketman (Best Song) **TIE**
- Wild Rose (Best Song) **TIE**
- Roger Deakins (Best Cinematography) – 1917
- Roman Griffin Davis (Best Young Actor/Actress) – Jojo Rabbit
- Sam Mendes (Best Director) – 1917

British nominees:

- 1917 (Best Picture, Best Production Design, Best Visual Effects, Best Action Movie, Best Score)
- The Aeronauts (Best Visual Effects)
- Downton Abbey (Best Production Design, Best Costume Design)
- Judy (Best Hair and Makeup)
- Marriage Story (Best Picture, Best Director, Best Actor, Best Actress, Best Acting Ensemble, Best Original Screenplay, Best Score)
- Once Upon a Time in Hollywood (Best Director, Best Actor, Best Young Actor/Actress, Best Acting Ensemble, Best Cinematography, Best Editing, Best Costume Design, Best Hair and Makeup)
- Rocketman (Best Costume Design, Best Hair and Makeup)
- The Two Popes (Best Supporting Actor, Best Adapted Screenplay)
- Anna Robbins (Best Costume Design) – Downton Abbey
- Anthony Hopkins (Best Supporting Actor) – The Two Popes
- Archie Yates (Best Young Actor/Actress) – Jojo Rabbit
- Christopher Peterson (Best Costume Design) – The Irishman
- Cynthia Erivo (Best Actress) – Harriet
- Donal Woods (Best Production Design) – Downton Abbey
- Florence Pugh (Best Supporting Actress) – Little Women
- Gina Cromwell (Best Production Design) – Downton Abbey
- Jacqueline Durran (Best Costume Design) – Little Women
- Julian Day (Best Costume Design) – Rocketman
- Lee Sandales (Best Production Design) – 1917
- Noah Jupe (Best Young Actor/Actress) – Honey Boy
- Sandy Powell (Best Costume Design) – The Irishman

=== Golden Globe Awards ===
The 77th Golden Globe Awards was presented on 5 January 2020.

British winners:

- 1917 (Best Motion Picture – Drama, Best Director)
- Judy (Best Performance in a Motion Picture – Musical or Comedy – Actress)
- Marriage Story (Best Supporting Performance in a Motion Picture – Actress)
- Once Upon a Time in Hollywood (Best Motion Picture – Musical or Comedy, Best Supporting Performance in a Motion Picture – Actor, Best Screenplay)
- Rocketman (Best Performance in a Motion Picture – Musical or Comedy – Actor, Best Original Song)
- Bernie Taupin (Best Original Song) – "(I'm Gonna) Love Me Again" (Rocketman)
- Elton John (Best Original Song) – "(I'm Gonna) Love Me Again" (Rocketman)
- Sam Mendes (Best Director) – 1917
- Taron Egerton (Best Performance in a Motion Picture – Musical or Comedy – Actor) – Rocketman

British nominees:

- 1917 (Best Original Score)
- Cats (Best Original Song)
- Marriage Story (Best Motion Picture – Drama, Best Performance in a Motion Picture – Drama – Actor, Best Performance in a Motion Picture – Drama – Actress, Best Screenplay)
- Once Upon a Time in Hollywood (Best Performance in a Motion Picture – Musical or Comedy – Actor, Best Director)
- Rocketman (Best Motion Picture – Musical or Comedy)
- The Two Popes (Best Motion Picture – Drama, Best Performance in a Motion Picture – Drama – Actor, Best Supporting Performance in a Motion Picture – Actor, Best Screenplay)
- Andrew Lloyd Webber (Best Original Song) – "Beautiful Ghosts" (Cats)
- Anthony Hopkins (Best Supporting Performance in a Motion Picture – Actor) – The Two Popes
- Christian Bale (Best Performance in a Motion Picture – Drama – Actor) – Le Mans '66
- Cynthia Erivo (Best Performance in a Motion Picture – Drama – Actress, Best Original Song) – Harriet, "Stand Up" (Harriet)
- Daniel Craig (Best Performance in a Motion Picture – Musical or Comedy – Actor) – Knives Out
- Daniel Pemberton (Best Original Score) – Motherless Brooklyn
- Emma Thompson (Best Performance in a Motion Picture – Musical or Comedy – Actress) – Late Night
- Roman Griffin Davis (Best Performance in a Motion Picture – Musical or Comedy – Actor) – Jojo Rabbit
- Jonathan Pryce (Best Performance in a Motion Picture – Drama – Actor) – The Two Popes
- Timothy Lee McKenzie (Best Original Song) – "Spirit" (The Lion King)

=== Screen Actors Guild Awards ===
The 26th Screen Actors Guild Awards was presented on 19 January 2019.

British winners:

- Judy (Outstanding Performance by a Female Actor in a Leading Role in a Motion Picture)
- Marriage Story (Outstanding Performance by a Female Actor in a Supporting Role in a Motion Picture)
- Once Upon a Time in Hollywood (Outstanding Performance by a Male Actor in a Supporting Role in a Motion Picture)

British nominees:

- Alfie Allen (Outstanding Performance by a Cast in a Motion Picture) – Jojo Rabbit
- Christian Bale (Outstanding Performance by a Male Actor in a Leading Role in a Motion Picture) – Le Mans '66
- Cynthia Erivo (Outstanding Performance by a Female Actor in a Leading Role in a Motion Picture) – Harriet
- Damian Lewis (Outstanding Performance by a Cast in a Motion Picture) – Once Upon a Time in Hollywood
- Malcolm McDowell (Outstanding Performance by a Cast in a Motion Picture) – Bombshell
- Roman Griffin Davis (Outstanding Performance by a Cast in a Motion Picture) – Jojo Rabbit
- Taron Egerton (Outstanding Performance by a Male Actor in a Leading Role) – Rocketman
- Stephen Graham (Outstanding Performance by a Cast in a Motion Picture) – The Irishman
- Stephen Merchant (Outstanding Performance by a Cast in a Motion Picture) – Jojo Rabbit
- Marriage Story (Male Actor in a Leading Role in a Motion Picture, Female Actor in a Leading Role in a Motion Picture)
- Once Upon a Time in Hollywood (Outstanding Performance by a Cast in a Motion Picture, Outstanding Performance by a Male Actor in a Leading Role in a Motion Picture, Outstanding Performance by a Stunt Ensemble in a Motion Picture)
- Rocketman (Outstanding Performance by a Male Actor in a Leading Role in a Motion Picture)

== See also ==
- Lists of British films
- 2020 in film
- 2020 in British music
- 2020 in British radio
- 2020 in British television
- 2020 in the United Kingdom
- List of 2020 box office number-one films in the United Kingdom
- List of British films of 2019
- List of British films of 2021
