= 73rd British Academy Film Awards =

2020 film award ceremony

- Date: 2 February 2020
- Site: Royal Albert Hall, London
- Hosted by: Graham Norton

Highlights
- Best Film: 1917
- Best British Film: 1917
- Best Actor: Joaquin Phoenix; Joker
- Best Actress: Renée Zellweger; Judy
- Most awards: 1917 (7)
- Most nominations: Joker (11)

The 73rd British Academy Film Awards, more commonly known as the BAFTAs, were held on 2 February 2020 at the Royal Albert Hall in London, honouring the best national and foreign films of 2019. Presented by the British Academy of Film and Television Arts, accolades were handed out for the best feature-length film and documentaries of any nationality that were screened at British cinemas in 2019.

The nominees were announced on 7 January 2020. The psychological thriller Joker received the most nominations in eleven categories; The Irishman and Once Upon a Time in Hollywood followed with ten apiece. The ceremony also marked the introduction of the BAFTA Award for Best Casting; Shayna Markowitz won for Joker. The ceremony also marked the tenth time an actor received dual nominations in the same category, with Margot Robbie's Best Supporting Actress nominations for both Bombshell and Once Upon a Time in Hollywood.

The ceremony was hosted by Graham Norton (who also hosts the BAFTA TV Awards), replacing Joanna Lumley following her two years of service as host.

== Winners and nominees ==
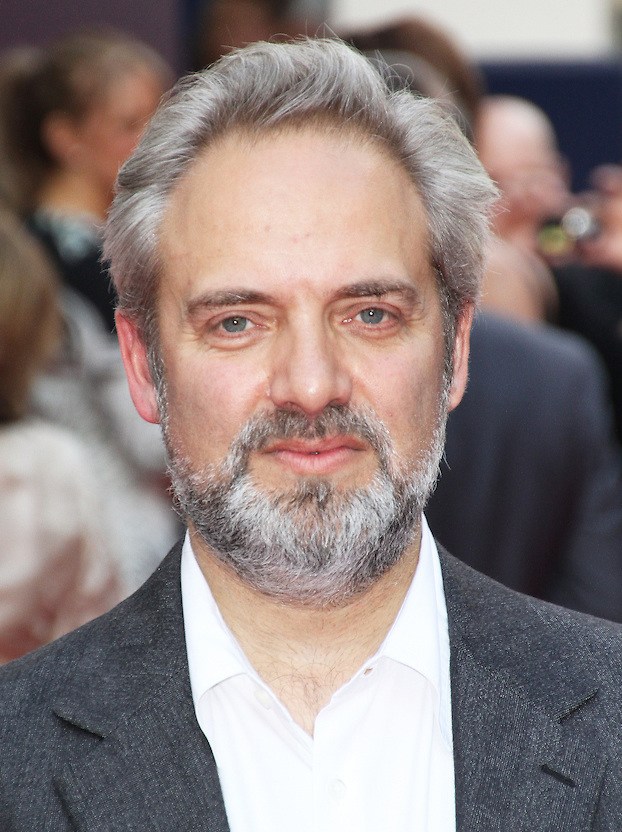
Sam Mendes, Best Film co-winner, Best Director winner and Outstanding British Film co-winner

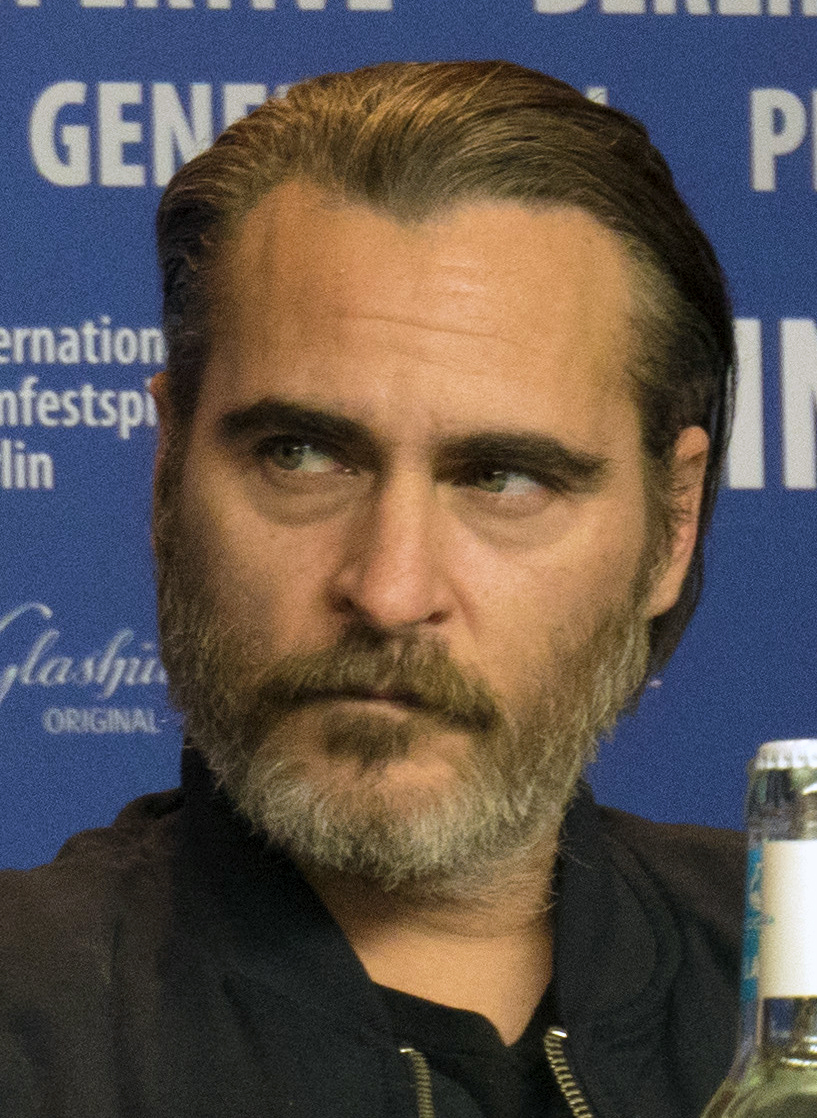
Joaquin Phoenix, Best Actor winner

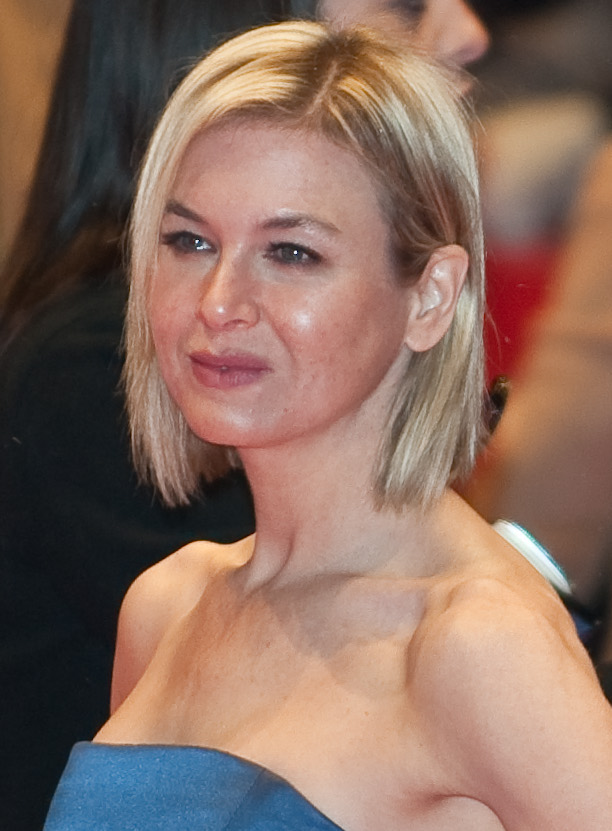
Renée Zellweger, Best Actress winner

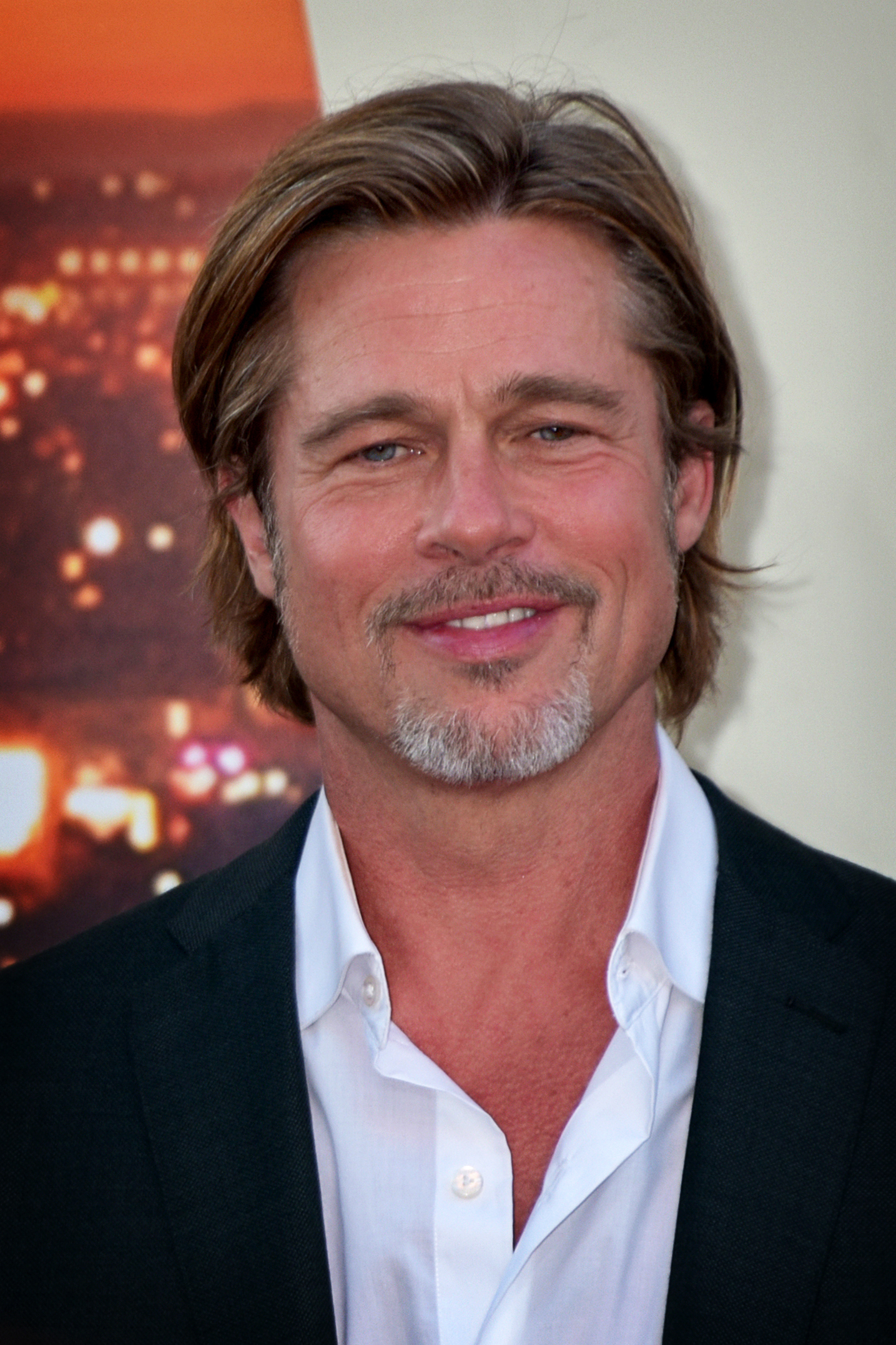
Brad Pitt, Best Supporting Actor winner

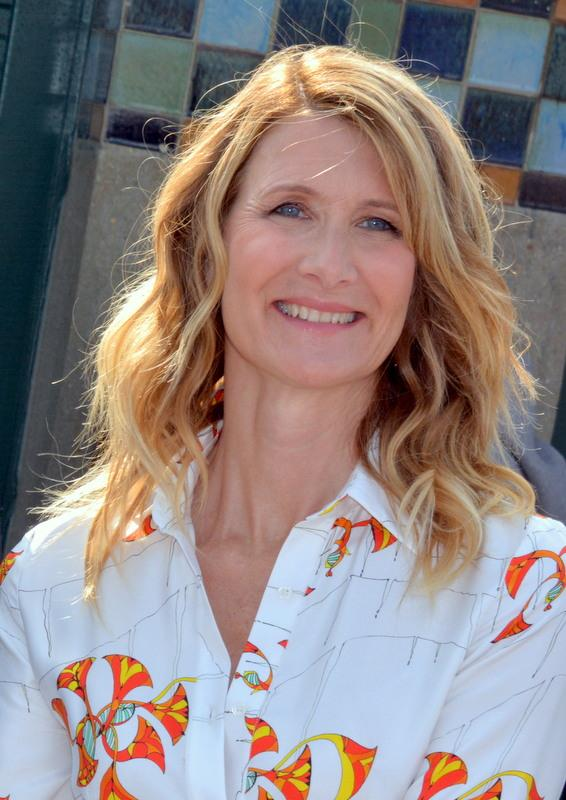
Laura Dern, Best Supporting Actress winner

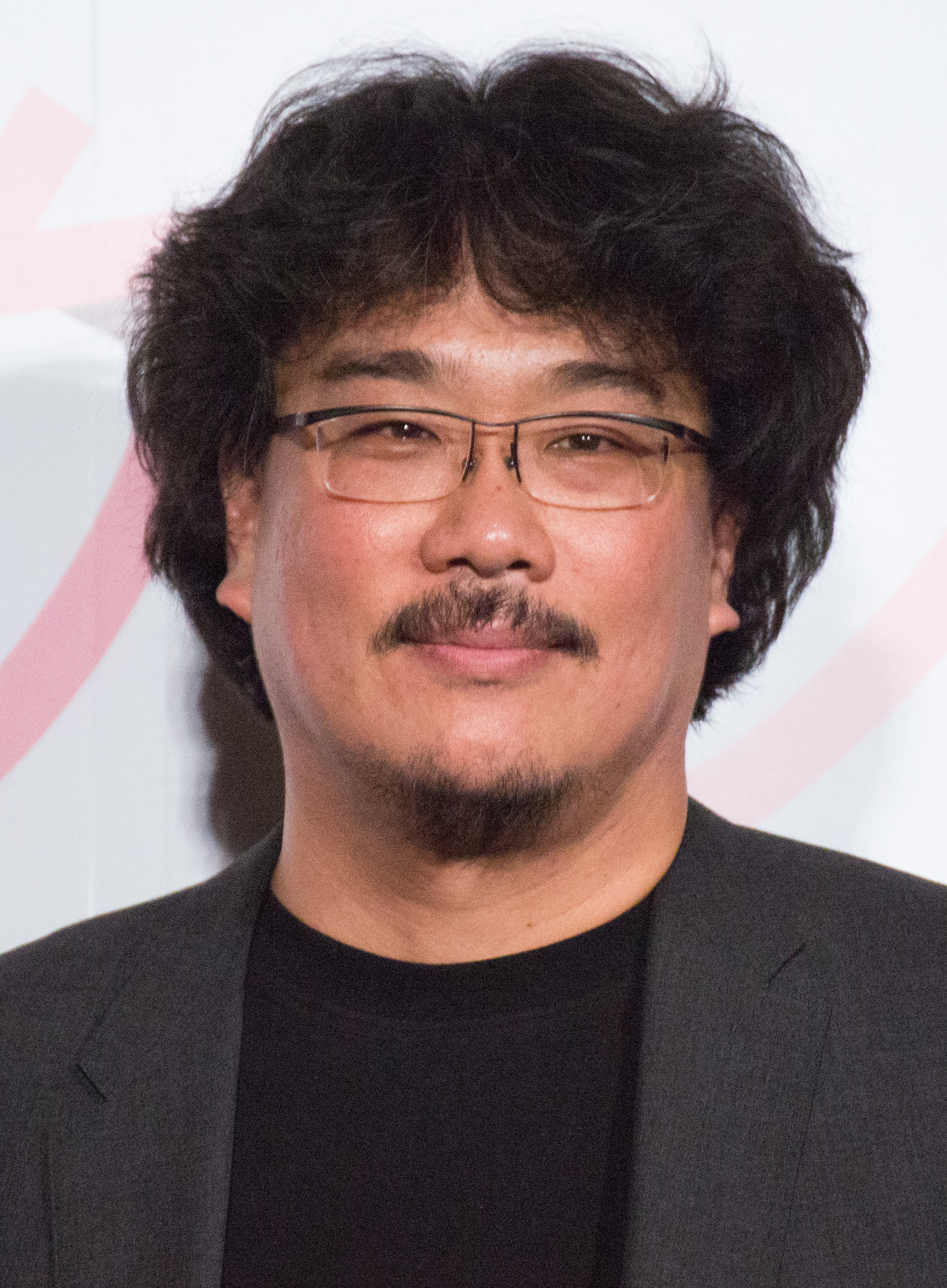
Bong Joon-ho, Best Original Screenplay co-winner and Best Film Not in the English Language winner

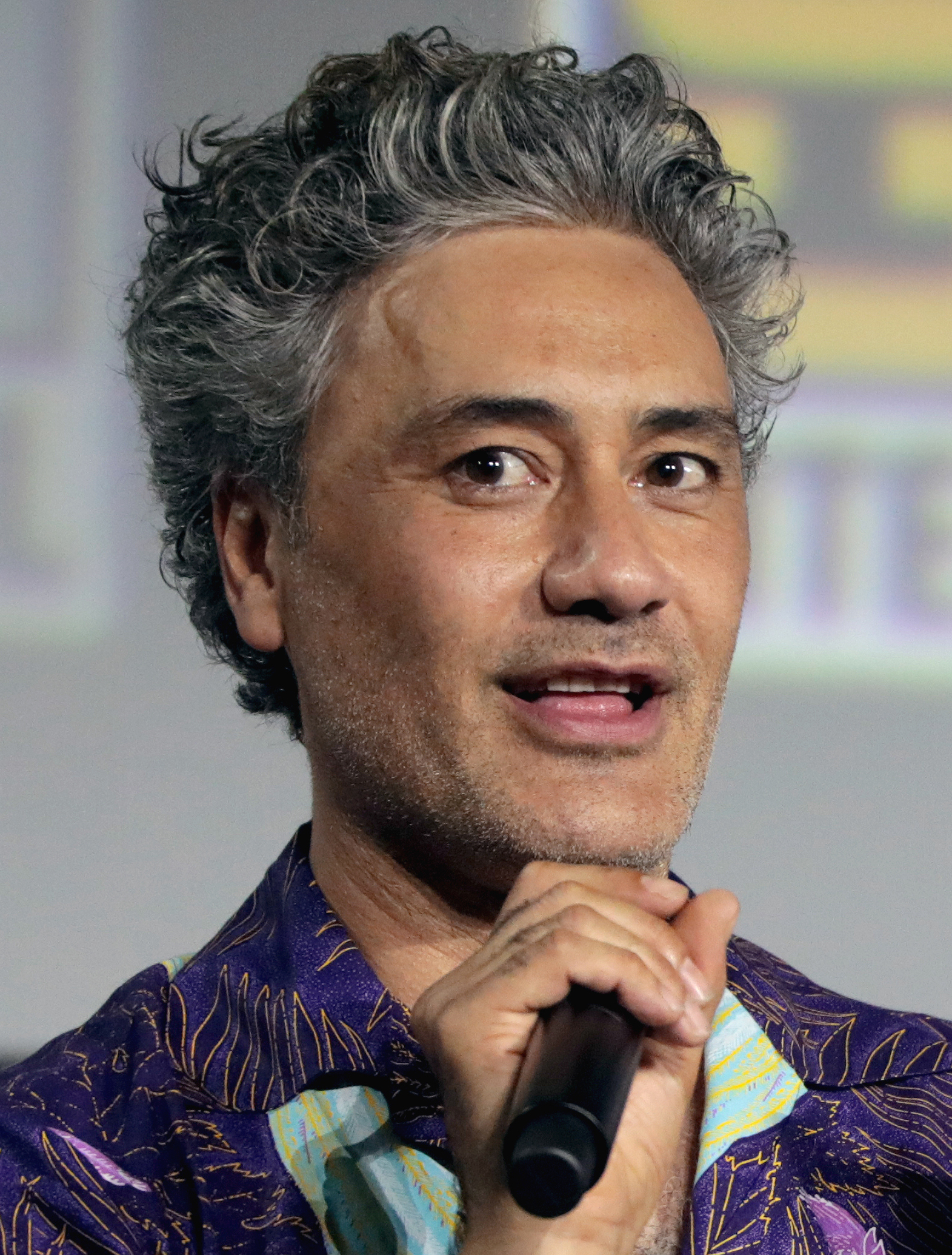
Taika Waititi, Best Adapted Screenplay winner

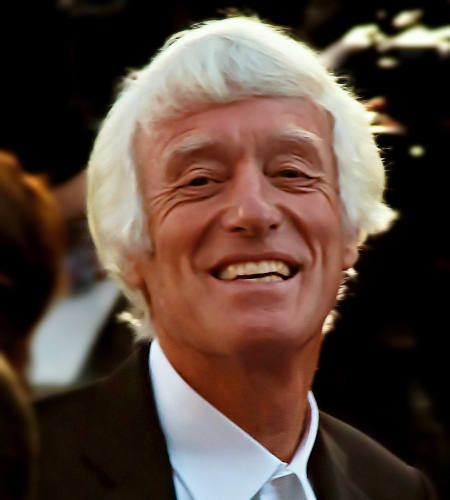
Roger Deakins, Best Cinematography winner

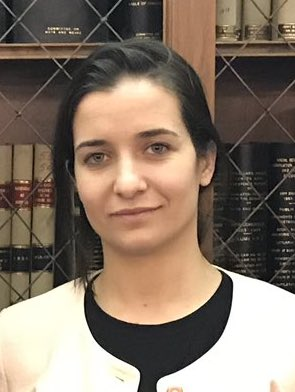
Waad Al-Kateab, Best Documentary co-winner

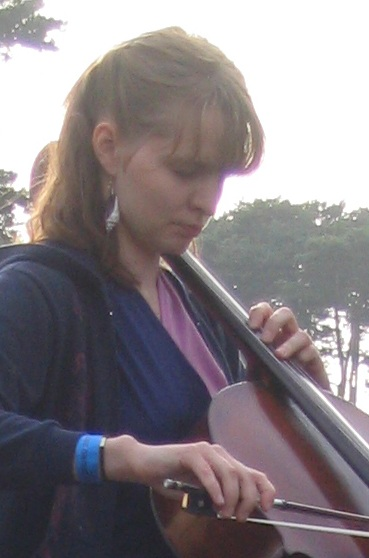
Hildur Guðnadóttir, Best Original Music winner

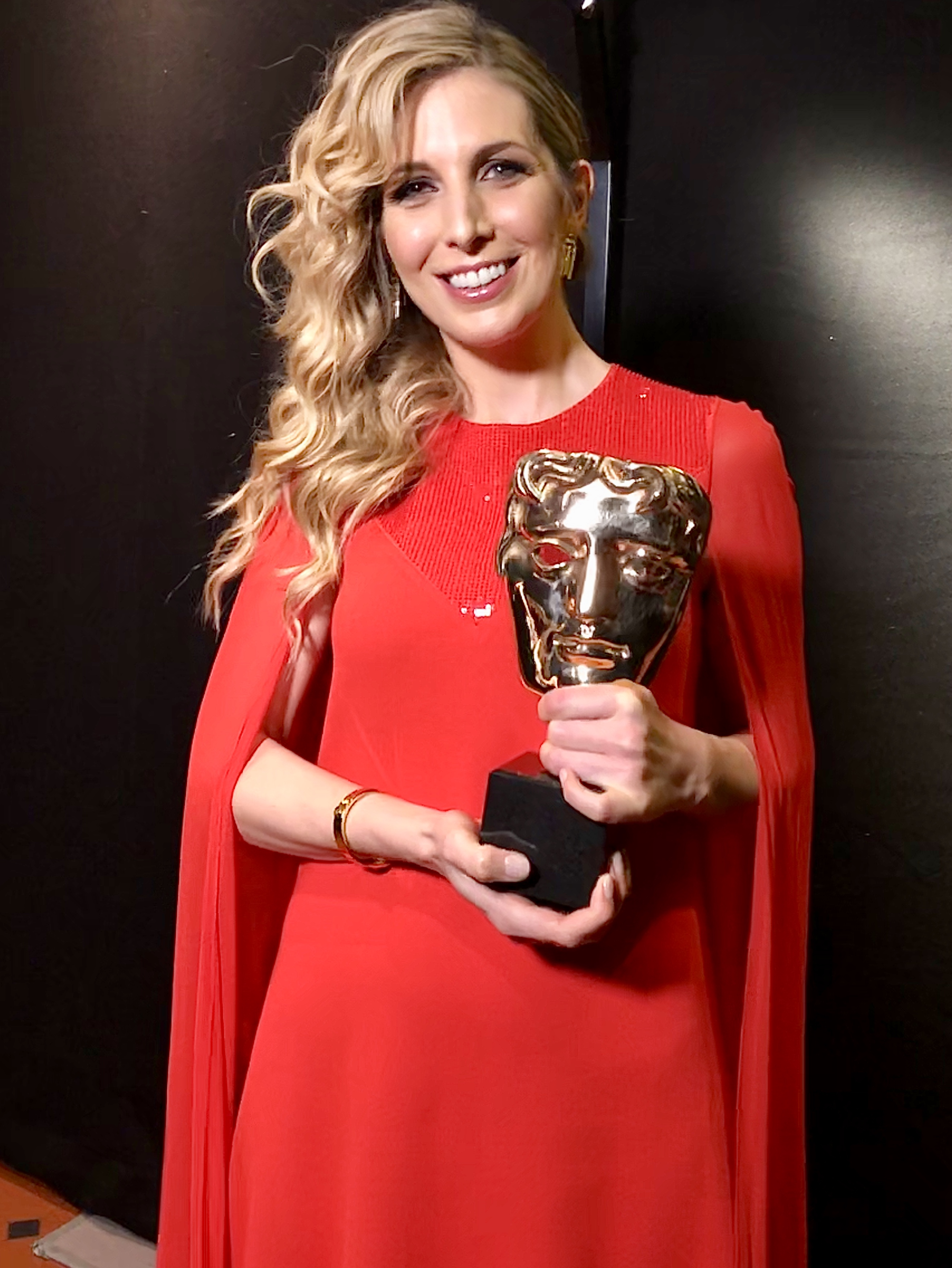
Rachael Tate, Best Sound co-winner

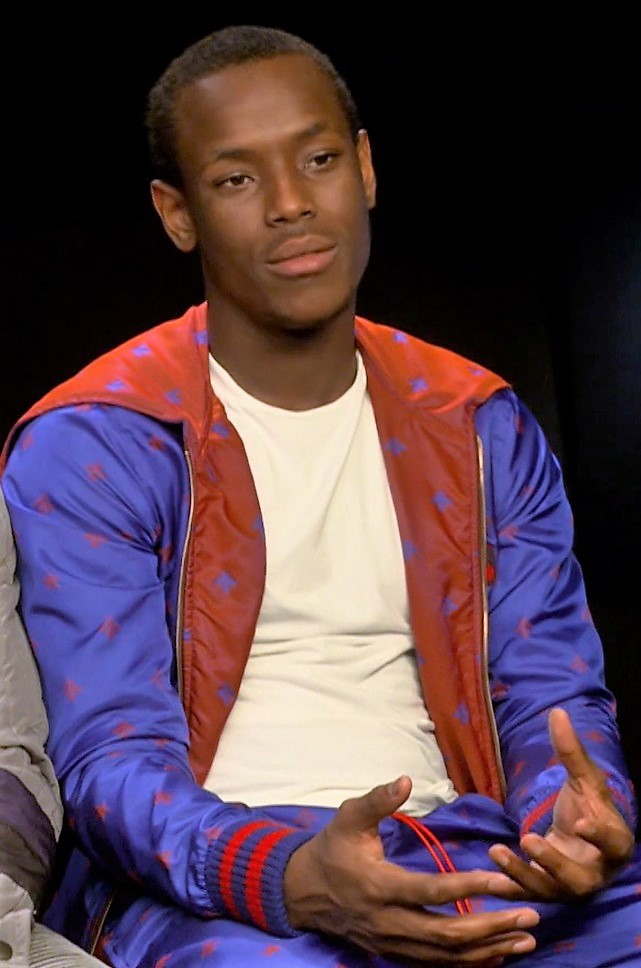
Micheal Ward, EE Rising Star Award winner

The nominees were announced on 7 January 2020. The winners were announced on 2 February 2020.

=== BAFTA Fellowship ===
- **Kathleen Kennedy**

=== Outstanding British Contribution to Cinema ===
- **Andy Serkis**

=== Awards ===
Winners are listed first and highlighted in boldface.

**Best Film**: **1917 – Pippa Harris, Callum McDougall, Sam Mendes and Jayne-Ann Tenggren**; The Irishman – Robert De Niro, Jane Rosenthal, Martin Scorsese and Emma Tillinger Koskoff; Joker – Bradley Cooper, Todd Phillips and Emma Tillinger Koskoff; Once Upon a Time in Hollywood – David Heyman, Shannon McIntosh and Quentin Tarantino; Parasite – Bong Joon-ho and Kwak Sin-ae	**Best Direction**: **Sam Mendes – 1917**; Bong Joon-ho – Parasite; Todd Phillips – Joker; Martin Scorsese – The Irishman; Quentin Tarantino – Once Upon a Time in Hollywood
**Best Actor in a Leading Role**: **Joaquin Phoenix – Joker as Arthur Fleck / Joker**; Leonardo DiCaprio – Once Upon a Time in Hollywood as Rick Dalton; Adam Driver – Marriage Story as Charlie Barber; Taron Egerton – Rocketman as Elton John; Jonathan Pryce – The Two Popes as Pope Francis	**Best Actress in a Leading Role**: **Renée Zellweger – Judy as Judy Garland**; Jessie Buckley – Wild Rose as Rose-Lynn Harlan; Scarlett Johansson – Marriage Story as Nicole Barber; Saoirse Ronan – Little Women as Josephine "Jo" March; Charlize Theron – Bombshell as Megyn Kelly
**Best Actor in a Supporting Role**: **Brad Pitt – Once Upon a Time in Hollywood as Cliff Booth**; Tom Hanks – A Beautiful Day in the Neighborhood as Fred Rogers; Anthony Hopkins – The Two Popes as Pope Benedict XVI; Al Pacino – The Irishman as Jimmy Hoffa; Joe Pesci – The Irishman as Russell Bufalino	**Best Actress in a Supporting Role**: **Laura Dern – Marriage Story as Nora Fanshaw**; Scarlett Johansson – Jojo Rabbit as Rosie; Florence Pugh – Little Women as Amy March; Margot Robbie – Bombshell as Kayla Pospisil; Margot Robbie – Once Upon a Time in Hollywood as Sharon Tate
**Best Original Screenplay**: **Parasite – Bong Joon-ho and Han Jin-won**; Booksmart – Susanna Fogel, Emily Halpern, Sarah Haskins and Katie Silberman; Knives Out – Rian Johnson; Marriage Story – Noah Baumbach; Once Upon a Time in Hollywood – Quentin Tarantino	**Best Adapted Screenplay**: **Jojo Rabbit – Taika Waititi**; The Irishman – Steven Zaillian; Joker – Todd Phillips and Scott Silver; Little Women – Greta Gerwig; The Two Popes – Anthony McCarten
**Best Casting**: **Joker – Shayna Markowitz**; Marriage Story – Douglas Aibel and Francine Maisler; Once Upon a Time in Hollywood – Victoria Thomas; The Personal History of David Copperfield – Sarah Crowe; The Two Popes – Javier Braier, Barbara Giordani, Nina Gold, Francesco Vedovati and Gabriel Villegas	**Best Cinematography**: **1917 – Roger Deakins**; Ford v Ferrari – Phedon Papamichael; The Irishman – Rodrigo Prieto; Joker – Lawrence Sher; The Lighthouse – Jarin Blaschke
**Best Costume Design**: **Little Women – Jacqueline Durran**; The Irishman – Christopher Peterson and Sandy Powell; Jojo Rabbit – Mayes C. Rubeo; Judy – Jany Temime; Once Upon a Time in Hollywood – Arianne Phillips	**Best Editing**: **Ford v Ferrari – Andrew Buckland and Michael McCusker**; The Irishman – Thelma Schoonmaker; Jojo Rabbit – Tom Eagles; Joker – Jeff Groth; Once Upon a Time in Hollywood – Fred Raskin
**Best Makeup and Hair**: **Bombshell – Vivian Baker, Kazu Hiro and Anne Morgan**; 1917 – Naomi Donne and Tristan Versluis; Joker – Kay Georgiou and Nicki Ledermann; Judy – Jeremy Woodhead; Rocketman – Lizzie Yianni Georgiou, Barrie Gower and Tapio Salmi	**Best Original Music**: **Joker – Hildur Guðnadóttir**; 1917 – Thomas Newman; Jojo Rabbit – Michael Giacchino; Little Women – Alexandre Desplat; Star Wars: The Rise of Skywalker – John Williams
**Best Production Design**: **1917 – Dennis Gassner and Lee Sandales**; The Irishman – Bob Shaw and Regina Graves; Jojo Rabbit – Ra Vincent and Nora Sopková; Joker – Mark Friedberg and Kris Moran; Once Upon a Time in Hollywood – Barbara Ling and Nancy Haigh	**Best Sound**: **1917 – Scott Millan, Oliver Tarney, Rachael Tate, Mark Taylor and Stuart Wilson**; Ford v Ferrari – David Giammarco, Paul Massey, Steven A. Morrow and Donald Sylvester; Joker – Tod A. Maitland, Alan Robert Murray, Tom Ozanich and Dean A. Zupancic; Rocketman – Matthew Collinge, John Hayes, Mike Prestwood Smith and Danny Sheehan; Star Wars: The Rise of Skywalker – David Acord, Andy Nelson, Christopher Scarabosio, Stuart Wilson and Matthew Wood
**Best Special Visual Effects**: **1917 – Greg Butler, Guillaume Rocheron and Dominic Tuohy**; Avengers: Endgame – Matt Aitken, Dan DeLeeuw, Russell Earl and Dan Sudick; The Irishman – Ivan Busquets, Leandro Estebecorena, Stephane Grabli and Pablo Helman; The Lion King – Andrew R. Jones, Robert Legato, Elliot Newman and Adam Valdez; Star Wars: The Rise of Skywalker – Roger Guyett, Paul Kavanagh, Neal Scanlan and Dominic Tuohy	**Best Animated Film**: **Klaus – Sergio Pablos and Jinko Gotoh**; Frozen 2 – Chris Buck, Jennifer Lee and Peter Del Vecho; A Shaun the Sheep Movie: Farmageddon – Will Becher, Richard Phelan and Paul Kewley; Toy Story 4 – Josh Cooley and Mark Nielsen
**Best Documentary**: **For Sama – Waad Al-Kateab and Edward Watts**; American Factory – Steven Bognar and Julia Reichert; Apollo 11 – Todd Douglas Miller; Diego Maradona – Asif Kapadia, James Gay-Rees and Paul Martin; The Great Hack – Karim Amer and Jehane Noujaim	**Best Film Not in the English Language**: **Parasite – Bong Joon-ho**; The Farewell – Lulu Wang and Daniele Melia; For Sama – Waad Al-Kateab and Edward Watts; Pain and Glory – Pedro Almodóvar and Agustín Almodóvar; Portrait of a Lady on Fire – Céline Sciamma and Bénédicte Couvreur
**Best British Short Animation**: **Grandad Was a Romantic – Maryam Mohajer**; In Her Boots – Kathrin Steinbacher; The Magic Boat – Naaman Azhari and Lilia Laurel	**Best British Short Film**: **Learning to Skateboard in a Warzone (If You're a Girl) – Carol Dysinger and Elena Andreicheva**; Azaar – Myriam Raja and Nathanael Baring; Goldfish – Hector Dockrill, Harri Kamalanathan, Benedict Turnbull and Laura Dockrill; Kamali – Sasha Rainbow and Rosalind Croad; The Trap – Lena Headey and Anthony Fitzgerald
**Outstanding British Film**: **1917 – Sam Mendes, Pippa Harris, Callum McDougall, Jayne-Ann Tenggren and Krysty Wilson-Cairns**; Bait – Mark Jenkin, Kate Byers and Linn Waite; For Sama – Waad Al-Kateab and Edward Watts; Rocketman – Dexter Fletcher, Adam Bohling, David Furnish, David Reid, Matthew Vaughn and Lee Hall; Sorry We Missed You – Ken Loach, Rebecca O'Brien and Paul Laverty; The Two Popes – Fernando Meirelles, Jonathan Eirich, Dan Lin, Tracey Seaward and Anthony McCarten	**Outstanding Debut by a British Writer, Director or Producer**: **Bait – Mark Jenkin (Writer/Director), Kate Byers and Linn Waite (Producer)**; For Sama – Waad Al-Kateab (Director/Producer) and Edward Watts (Director); Maiden – Alex Holmes (Director); Only You – Harry Wootliff (Writer/Director); Retablo – Álvaro Delgado-Aparicio (Writer/Director)
**Rising Star Award**: **Micheal Ward**; Awkwafina; Kaitlyn Dever; Kelvin Harrison Jr.; Jack Lowden

== Ceremony information ==
The ceremony took place in the Royal Albert Hall and was hosted by Irish television comedian Graham Norton, who had previously hosted the 2019 British Academy Television Awards. Viewing ratings for the ceremony fell to a twelve-year low, peaking at 3.5 million, though being the most-viewed show in the UK after 22:00. The ratings drop may be a result of the broadcast delay, with many live news outlets publishing the results before they were televised and revealed on television.

Discussions about the lack of diversity within the award nominations surrounded the ceremony, with the host referring to it as "the year when white men finally broke through". He also described eleven-time nominee Joker as "essentially the story of a white man who makes himself even whiter". Best Director presenter (a category of all-male nominees) Rebel Wilson joked about the absence of females in the category, quipping: "Honestly, I just don't have the balls." Best Actor in a Leading Role winner Joaquin Phoenix used his speech to comment on the "systemic racism" of the BAFTAs and acting industry in general. Speaking ahead of the ceremony, BAFTA chairwoman Pippa Harris addressed her frustration in the lack of recognition for female directors, as well as the issues around diversity as a whole. In his closing speech to the ceremony, BAFTA president Prince William had prepared a speech discussing the issue, saying that "a wide-ranging review of the whole awards process" was underway and that lack of diversity "simply cannot be right in this day and age".

1917 was the night's biggest winner, winning seven prizes in total of its nine nominations, including Best Film and Best Director (Sam Mendes), despite not having any acting nominees and thus becoming a favourite for the then upcoming 92nd Academy Awards; it lost to Parasite. Mendes became the first British winner to win Best Director in eleven years. Since votes for the Academy Awards must be registered two days after the BAFTA Awards, Screen Daily noted that 1917 would be a safe choice for Academy members, who are averse to streaming films based on 1917's marketing as a "must-see on the big screen". This compares to the Netflix film The Irishman being the night's biggest loser, taking no awards despite ten nominations; Netflix productions in total received twenty-three nominations, winning only two: Best Actress in a Supporting Role for Laura Dern (Marriage Story) and Best Animated Film (Klaus). Screen Daily also suggested that there is anecdotal evidence of Netflix not supporting its nominees as much as it did last year for Roma (2018). The writers of Screen Daily additionally suggested that there was some controversy surrounding the British identity of some films nominated for Outstanding British Film; 1917 is financed by the US, and Retablo is a Peruvian film co-produced with Norway and Germany, whose Peruvian director—Álvaro Delgado-Aparicio—only lives in London. The ceremony also marked the first year since the 30th British Academy Film Awards (1977) in which there were no British acting winners.

Wins marking diversity were Outstanding Debut by a British Writer, Director or Producer for Bait, a film described by its writer-director as "a black and white, 16-millimetre, hand-processed, post-synced film in Academy ratio about Cornish fishing people"; Best Documentary for For Sama, a personal story of bombings at a Syrian hospital made by the family involved, with them using their speech to "implore the UK not to ignore the ongoing plight of the people of the Syrian city of Idlib"; and the Rising Star Award for Micheal Ward, star of Rapman's Blue Story (which received no nominations), who used his speech to say that he "feels like we're going in the right direction" in terms of diversity.

Best Actress in a Leading Role winner Renée Zellweger noted in the press room that she felt like part of "the British gang"; after accepting her award, Hugh Grant had taken to the stage to present, quipping "well done Jones" as Zellweger left, a reference to their roles in the British film Bridget Jones's Diary (2001). Later in the press room, the young Sama Al-Kateab, who had been held by her parents on stage while accepting Best Documentary, was allowed to roam and took to running the length of the stage and playing with microphones. With his fifth win for Best Cinematography for 1917, Roger Deakins becomes the most-decorated BAFTA winner in the category. Collecting his BAFTA, he said: "I think it was George Orwell that said all films are special but some films are more special than others, and for me this was a really special film." The recent Brexit was also mentioned, appearing in Brad Pitt's acceptance speech for Best Actor in a Supporting Role delivered by co-star Margot Robbie; Pitt's speech also noted that he would name his award "Harry" because he's going to take it to the United States.

== Statistics ==
Films that received multiple nominations
Nominations	Film
11	Joker
10	The Irishman
10	Once Upon a Time in Hollywood
9	1917
6	Jojo Rabbit
5	Little Women
5	Marriage Story
5	The Two Popes
4	For Sama
4	Parasite
4	Rocketman
3	Bombshell
3	Ford v Ferrari
3	Judy
3	Star Wars: The Rise of Skywalker
2	Bait

Films that received multiple awards
Awards	Film
7	1917
3	Joker
2	Parasite

== In Memoriam ==
- Rutger Hauer
- Terry Rawlings
- Lawrence G. Paull
- Bibi Andersson
- John Sargent
- Terry Jones
- Richard Williams
- John Singleton
- Peter Fonda
- Robert Evans
- Stanley Donen
- Robert Forster
- Nigel Goldsack
- Agnès Varda
- Michelle Guish
- Nik Powell
- Franco Zeffirelli
- Valentina Cortese
- Buck Henry
- Danny Aiello
- Anna Karina
- Gerry Lewis
- Peter Mayhew
- Norman Garwood
- Sue Lyon
- Freddie Jones
- Doris Day

== See also ==
- 9th AACTA International Awards
- 92nd Academy Awards
- 45th César Awards
- 25th Critics' Choice Awards
- 72nd Directors Guild of America Awards
- 33rd European Film Awards
- 77th Golden Globe Awards
- 40th Golden Raspberry Awards
- 34th Goya Awards
- 35th Independent Spirit Awards
- 25th Lumière Awards
- 10th Magritte Awards
- 7th Platino Awards
- 31st Producers Guild of America Awards
- 24th Satellite Awards
- 46th Saturn Awards
- 26th Screen Actors Guild Awards
- 72nd Writers Guild of America Awards
