= Franz Jalics =

Jesuit priest and author (1927–2021)

- Born: 16 November 1927; Budapest, Hungary
- Died: 13 February 2021 (aged 93); Budapest, Hungary
- Occupation: Jesuit priest
- Known for: Abduction and detention by an Argentinian death squad

Franz Jalics (Hungarian: Jálics Ferenc; 16 November 1927 – 13 February 2021) was a Hungarian-born Jesuit priest and author of books on Christian spirituality.

== Life ==
Jalics was born in Budapest, Hungary. At a young age, he attended a school for cadets. He had a key spiritual experience while stationed in Germany, and after the Second World War, in 1947 he joined the Jesuit order. He studied philosophy in Germany, and later in Belgium.

In 1956, he was sent to Chile, and one year later to Buenos Aires, to continue his studies. After being ordained as a Roman Catholic priest, he stayed in Argentina, and later became a professor of theology and the spiritual director of young Jesuits. He left South America in 1977, moved first to the United States, and then in 1978 to Gries, Germany, where he gave contemplative retreats. He developed a special method of Christian meditation combining elements of the Spiritual Exercises of Ignatius of Loyola with the Jesus Prayer.

Until 2004, he was the director of Haus Gries, the retreat centre he had founded in Wilhelmsthal, Upper Franconia. In 2017, he moved back to Budapest, where he died from COVID-19 complications on 13 February 2021, aged 93.

== Abduction ==
While doing social work in a poor neighborhood in Argentina in 1976 during the Dirty War, Jalics and Orlando Yorio [es] were captured by a death squad, abducted, and held captive for five months. After being tortured in captivity, the priests were found alive months later outside Buenos Aires, drugged and partially unclothed.

Jesuit Father General Pedro Arrupe in Rome was informed by letter during the abduction. Both Jalics and Orlando Yorio left the Jesuit Order, but were later offered reinstatement to it: Jalics accepted but Yorio did not. On 15 April 2005, a human rights lawyer filed a criminal complaint against Cardinal Jorge Mario Bergoglio, S.J.—then the Archbishop of Buenos Aires (and who became Pope Francis in 2013)—as superior in the Society of Jesus of Argentina, accusing him of involvement in the kidnapping. The complaint was later dismissed.

On 15 March 2013, Fr. Jalics made a public statement on the occasion of the election of his former superior, who as Pope had taken the same name (Ferenc is Hungarian for Francis), describing how they met up again years later and had concelebrated Mass together: "Ich bin mit den Geschehnissen versöhnt und betrachte sie meinerseits als abgeschlossen." ("I have been reconciled to the events and from my side consider them closed.") Fr. Jalics wished God's providential blessing on the Pope: "Ich wünsche Papst Franziskus Gottes reichen Segen für sein Amt." (signed) P. Franz Jalics SJ, 15. März 2013 ("I hope God will bless Pope Francis abundantly in his duties") Fr. Jalics subsequently elaborated on his experiences, in particular how a female lay catechist was culpable for their denunciations, "Wie ich in meiner früheren Erklärung deutlich gemacht habe, sind wir wegen einer Katechetin verhaftet worden, die zuerst mit uns zusammenarbeitete und später in die Guerilla eintrat [aufgrund eines Übersetzungsfehlers wurde sie in der vorigen Erklärung als Mann bezeichnet]." ("As I made perfectly clear in my prior statement, we were arrested because of a female catechist, who had at first collaborated with us and then later joined the guerillas [whose identity, owing to a translation error, was characterized as male in the earlier statement].") The second public statement was issued a week later, on 20 March 2013, also through the Jesuits' German Province.

== In fiction ==
The 2019 film The Two Popes shows different aspects of the life of Jorge Bergoglio, with Lisandro Fiks playing Jalics. Jalics is shown extensively throughout pivotal moments of Bergoglio's spiritual life, from the moment Bergoglio joins the seminary, to a later scene where Bergoglio tries to make the Jesuits, Jalics among them, stop their work with the poor. The film implies that, though Bergoglio did not denounce him directly, he removed the protection of the Church from Jalics' mission, indirectly leading to Jalics' arrest, imprisonment and torture. Near the end, a scene of reconciliation between Bergoglio and Jalics is shown.

== Publications ==
=== In English ===
- Contemplative Retreat. An introduction to the contemplative way to life and to the Jesus prayer (translated by Lucia Wiedenhöver), Longwood: Xulon Press, 2003, ISBN 1-594671-56-7.
- Called to Share in His Life: Introduction to a Contemplative Way of Life and the Jesus Prayer (a Retreat), Mumbai: St Pauls, 2010, ISBN 81-7109-398-1
- The Contemplative Way. Quietly savoring God's presence (translated by Matthias Altrichter), New York: Paulist Press, 2011, ISBN 978-0-809-14722-9.

=== In German ===
- Lernen wir beten: Eine Anleitung, mit Gott ins Gespräch zu kommen, München: Pfeiffer, 1981 ISBN 978-3-7904-0353-4.
- Kontemplative Exerzitien, Würzburg: Echter, 1994, ISBN 978-3-429-01576-3.
- Der kontemplative Weg, Würzburg: Echter, 2006, ISBN 978-3-429-02767-4.
- Miteinander im Glauben wachsen: Anleitung zum geistlichen Begleitgespräch. Aus dem Spanischen von Isabella Jalics, Würzburg: Echter, 2008, ISBN 978-3-429-02988-3.
- Die geistliche Begleitung im Evangelium, Würzburg: Echter, 2012, ISBN 978-3-429-03482-5.

=== In Spanish ===
- Aprendiendo a Orar, San Pablo 1984, ISBN 9788428510097.
- Ejercicios de contemplación. Introducción a la vida contemplativa y a la invocación de Jesús, Ediciones Sígueme 1998, ISBN 9788430113309.
- Cambios en la fe, San Pablo 2007, ISBN 9789508613134.
- El camino de la contemplación, Paulinas 2010, ISBN 9500915766.
- Jesús, maestro de meditación: el acompañamiento espiritual en el evangelio, PPC 2015, ISBN 9788428827935.
- La fase contemplativa de los Ejercicios ignacianos, Cristianisme i Justícia (Fundació Lluís Espinal) 2018, ISBN 978-8497304108.

== See also ==
- List of kidnappings
- List of solved missing person cases
