= Learning to Skateboard in a Warzone (If You're a Girl) =

2019 short documentary film by Carol Dysinger

Learning to Skateboard in a Warzone (if you're a girl)
- Film poster
- Directed by: Carol Dysinger
- Produced by: Elean Andreicheva, Molly Thompson, Orlando von Einsiedel
- Cinematography: Lisa Rinzler
- Edited by: Mary Manhardt
- Music by: Sasha Gordon
- Animation by: Fleur Davisz; Simon Tubbs
- Production companies: Lifetime Films; A&E IndieFilms; Grain Media
- Release date: 28 April 2019
- Running time: 39 minutes
- Country: United Kingdom

Learning to Skateboard in a Warzone (if you're a girl) is a 2019 British documentary short film directed by Carol Dysinger and produced by Elena Andreicheva. It won the Academy Award for Best Documentary Short Subject at the 92nd Academy Awards.

== Summary ==
The film is about Skateistan, a nonprofit organization, which started as a skate school in 2007 for girls from impoverished neighborhoods learning to read, write, and skateboard in Kabul, Afghanistan, where young women are not allowed to participate in sporting activities.

== Awards ==
=== Academy Awards ===
Year	Category	Nominated work	Result
2020	Best Documentary Feature (Short Subject)	Learning to Skateboard in a Warzone (if you're a girl)	Won

=== British Academy Film Awards ===
Year	Category	Nominated work	Result
2020	Best British Short Film	Learning to Skateboard in a Warzone (If You're a Girl)	Won

== See also ==
- 2019 in film
- Culture of Afghanistan
- Skateboarding
