= The Two Popes =

2019 film directed by Fernando Meirelles

- Official release poster
- Directed by: Fernando Meirelles
- Screenplay by: Anthony McCarten
- Based on: The Pope by Anthony McCarten
- Produced by: Dan Lin; Jonathan Eirich; Tracey Seaward
- Starring: Anthony Hopkins; Jonathan Pryce
- Cinematography: César Charlone
- Edited by: Fernando Stutz
- Music by: Bryce Dessner
- Production company: Rideback
- Distributed by: Netflix
- Release dates: August 31, 2019 (Telluride); November 27, 2019 (United States); November 29, 2019 (United Kingdom)
- Running time: 125 minutes
- Countries: United Kingdom; United States; Italy; Argentina
- Languages: English; Spanish; Italian
- Budget: $40 million
- Box office: $758,711

The Two Popes is a 2019 biographical drama film directed by Fernando Meirelles and written by Anthony McCarten, adapted from McCarten's play The Pope which premiered at Royal & Derngate Theatre in 2019. Predominantly set in Vatican City in the aftermath of the Vatican leaks scandal, the film follows Pope Benedict XVI, played by Anthony Hopkins, as he attempts to convince Cardinal Jorge Mario Bergoglio (who eventually becomes Pope Francis), played by Jonathan Pryce, to reconsider his decision to resign as an archbishop as he confides his own intentions to abdicate the papacy.

The film premiered at the Telluride Film Festival on August 31, 2019. It began a limited theatrical release in the United States on November 27, 2019, and in the United Kingdom on November 29, and started digital streaming on December 20, by Netflix. The performances of Pryce and Hopkins, as well as McCarten's screenplay, received high praise from critics, and all three received nominations for their work at the Academy Awards, Golden Globes and British Academy Film Awards.

== Plot ==
In April 2005, Cardinal Jorge Mario Bergoglio, Archbishop of Buenos Aires, is called to the Vatican after the death of Pope John Paul II to elect a new pope. Cardinal Joseph Ratzinger, a prominent German prelate, is elected Pope Benedict XVI; Cardinal Bergoglio receives the second-highest vote count. Seven years later, the Catholic Church is embroiled in the Vatican leaks scandal, and Benedict's tenure has been tainted by public accusations regarding his role in the coverup.

Bergoglio has submitted his resignation as archbishop, but the Vatican has not responded. As he prepares to go to Rome and personally deliver his resignation, he is summoned to the Vatican. Bergoglio and Benedict meet at the Palace of Castel Gandolfo, the Pope's summer residence. The two debate the roles of God and the Church. Benedict recounts what led him to the priesthood and talks about his interests. The two watch Benedict's favorite TV show, Inspector Rex, which further delays their discussion about Bergoglio's resignation.

Bergoglio recounts his early life and path into the church. He ended his marital engagement and joined the Jesuits. He was met by Father Franz Jalics and Father Orlando Yorio, who become his spiritual friends. Benedict rejects Bergoglio's resignation, saying the world would perceive it as a vote of no confidence in his leadership and weaken the Catholic Church. Benedict and Bergoglio put aside their differences and chat informally, gradually warming to each other.

The next day, the two go to the Vatican by helicopter. Benedict continues to avoid discussing Bergoglio's resignation. Benedict meets with Bergoglio in the Room of Tears within the Sistine Chapel, where he confides his intention to resign the papacy. Shocked, Bergoglio objects and argues for church tradition and continuity. Benedict says his opinions regarding tradition are different now and believes change is essential. Benedict says Bergoglio could be his successor, but Bergoglio rejects the idea, citing the perception that he had collaborated with the Argentine military dictatorship, and his failure to protect his friends and confront the junta may have damaged his reputation. Following the "Dirty War", Bergoglio was removed as head of the Argentine Society of Jesus and exiled to serve as an ordinary parish priest to the poor for the next ten years.

Over time, Bergoglio reconciled with Father Jalics, but regrets never reconciling with Father Yorio. Memories of his actions and inaction during the dictatorship continually haunt him. Benedict comforts Bergoglio, reminding him that the freedom to choose to help is often stifled; he gives Bergoglio absolution. Then Benedict confesses he was aware of Father Marcial Maciel's long-term sexual misconduct and regrets staying silent, implying that this is the reason why he wants to resign: Benedict no longer hears God's words and affirms his wish to abdicate. Bergoglio comforts Benedict and offers him absolution as well. The two emerge from the room, surprising tourists. Benedict goes outside to greet the masses and take selfies with them. Bergoglio departs for Argentina.

One year later, Pope Benedict XVI delivers his resignation to the world. Bergoglio is elected as his successor in the 2013 papal conclave and becomes Pope Francis; in his first Urbi et Orbi, he prays for Benedict, who watches the speech on television from Castel Gandolfo. The two popes watch the 2014 FIFA World Cup final between their national home teams, Germany and Argentina, together.

== Cast ==
- Jonathan Pryce as Cardinal Jorge Mario Bergoglio, the future Pope Francis
  - Juan Minujín as Young Jorge Mario Bergoglio
- Anthony Hopkins as Pope Benedict XVI
- Luis Gnecco as Cláudio Cardinal Hummes
- Sidney Cole as Peter Cardinal Turkson
- Lisandro Fiks as Father Franz Jalics
- Maria Ucedo as Esther Ballestrino
- Willie Jonah as Francis Cardinal Arinze
- Thomas D. Williams as The American Journalist
- Achille Brugnini as Carlo Maria Cardinal Martini
- Federico Torre as Cardinal Protodeacon Estévez
- Germán de Silva as Father Orlando Yorio
- Libero De Rienzo as Roberto
- Josello Bella as Admiral Emilio Eduardo Massera
- Luis Alfredo Huerga Reyna as Captain Alfredo Astiz

== Production ==
On September 6, 2017, Netflix announced that it would produce the film, directed by Fernando Meirelles and written by Anthony McCarten. Jonathan Pryce and Anthony Hopkins would play Cardinal Bergoglio and Pope Benedict XVI, respectively. Filming was set to begin that November in Argentina. The film began production in Rome in April 2018.

Filming locations included a refugee camp in Rome, a full-size reproduction of the Sistine Chapel interior created at the Cinecittà studios in Rome, an area outside Castel Gandolfo (the pope's summer palace), various locations in Rome as stand-ins for scenes at the Vatican, and poor areas of Buenos Aires. The St. Peter's Square plaza was recreated using computer-generated imagery. Some scenes were shot in Royal Palace of Caserta and in villa Farnese in Caprarola, near Rome. The poster image is the hunting lodge of villa Farnese.

Much of the coverage of the film in the news media has centered on the reconstructed Sistine Chapel, built in a studio during an eight-week period. To create a realistic look for the artwork, the producers hired a company that produced a "stick-on tattoo" of the walls and ceiling. "The ink from the tattoo is absorbed into the plaster so [...] we got all the texture and the vibrancy", said production designer Mark Tildesley.

== Release ==
The film had its world premiere at the Telluride Film Festival on August 31, 2019. It also was screened at the 2019 Toronto International Film Festival on September 9. Netflix gave the film a theatrical limited release in the United States beginning November 27, 2019, and in the United Kingdom beginning November 29, 2019. It then started streaming it on its service on December 20, 2019.

== Reception ==
=== Box office ===
Although Netflix does not publicly disclose the theatrical box office of its films, IndieWire estimated The Two Popes grossed around $32,000 from four theaters in its opening weekend (and a total $48,000 over its five-day Thanksgiving opening weekend). The site wrote that "the drama is starting more modestly than other recent Netflix titles. Attendance at the two high-end Landmark theaters in New York and Los Angeles has been modest. Neither small-scale auditorium sold out." The film then made an estimated $50,000 from 19 theaters in its second weekend, and $200,000 from 150 in its third. In its fourth week, upon being released digitally onto Netflix, the film made $90,000 from 44 theaters.

=== Critical response ===
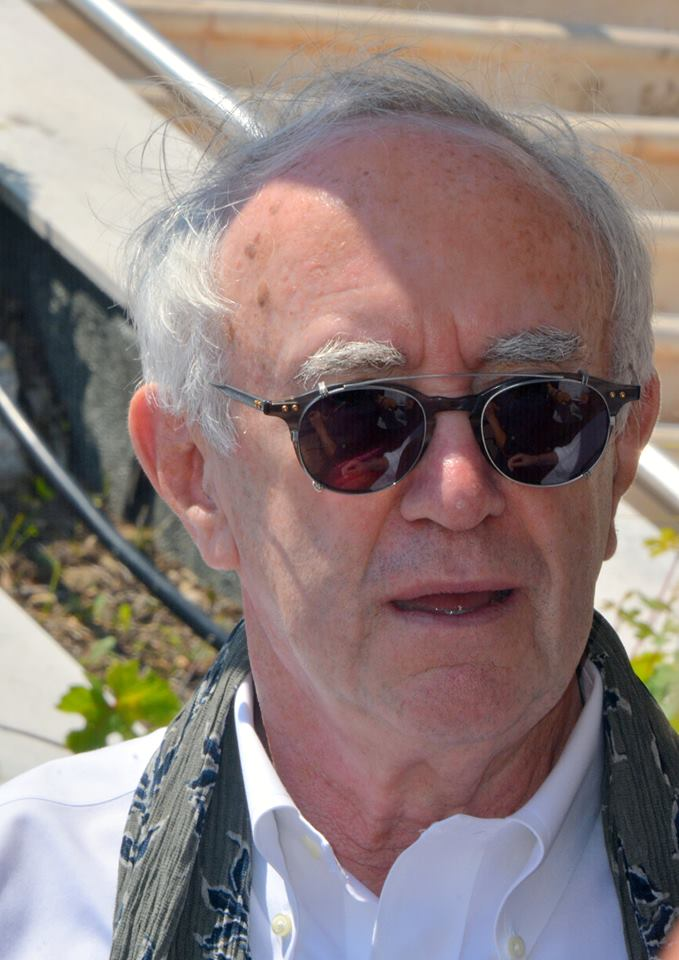
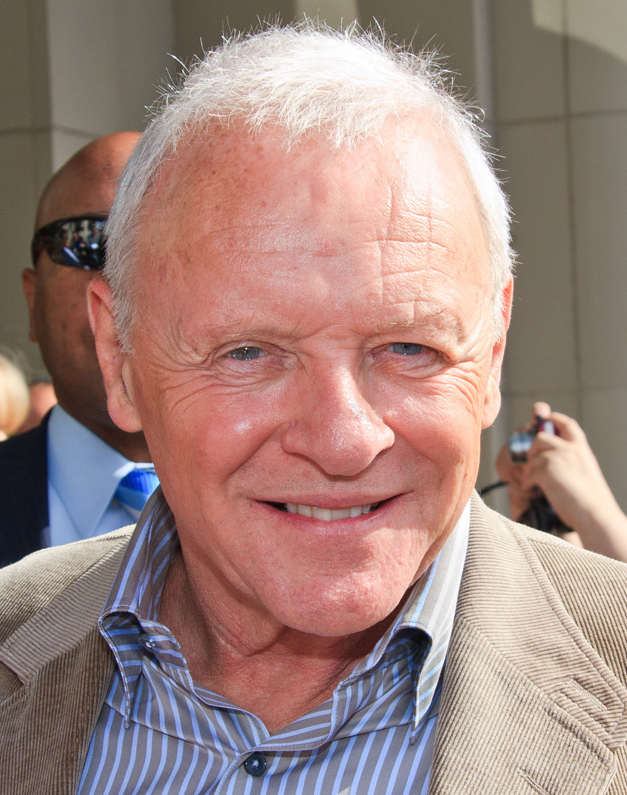
The performances of Jonathan Pryce and Anthony Hopkins received critical acclaim, earning them Academy Award nominations for Best Actor and Best Supporting Actor respectively.

According to Variety, The Two Popes was "an unexpected hit" at its premiere at the Telluride Film Festival, receiving praise for its humor and the two lead actors' performances. On the review aggregator Rotten Tomatoes, the film holds an approval rating of 89% based on 229 reviews, with an average of 7.3/10. The site's critics consensus reads, "Led by outstanding performances from its well-matched leads, The Two Popes draws absorbing drama from a pivotal moment in modern organized religion." On Metacritic, the film has a weighted average score of 75 out of 100, based on 39 critics, indicating "generally favorable reviews".

Fr. Hines writing for the Catholic Digest notes that the plot is a "creative imagining" of what might have happened if the two had met prior to the abdication. Hines goes on to say that the film exaggerates the differences between the two popes and, at points, the dialogue feels hokey. Overall though, Hines described the film as "wonderful" lauding the strong performances of Hopkins and Pryce, as well as the themes of forgiveness and mercy.

== Accolades ==
Award	Date of ceremony	Category	Recipients	Result	Ref.
Academy Awards	February 9, 2020	Best Actor	Jonathan Pryce	Nominated	
Academy Awards	February 9, 2020	Best Supporting Actor	Anthony Hopkins	Nominated	
Academy Awards	February 9, 2020	Best Adapted Screenplay	Anthony McCarten	Nominated	
British Academy Film Awards	February 2, 2020	Outstanding British Film	Fernando Meirelles; Dan Lin; Jonathan Eirich; Tracey Seaward; Anthony McCarten	Nominated	
British Academy Film Awards	February 2, 2020	Best Actor	Jonathan Pryce	Nominated	
British Academy Film Awards	February 2, 2020	Best Supporting Actor	Anthony Hopkins	Nominated	
British Academy Film Awards	February 2, 2020	Best Adapted Screenplay	Anthony McCarten	Nominated	
British Academy Film Awards	February 2, 2020	Best Casting	Nina Gold	Nominated	
Critics' Choice Movie Awards	January 12, 2020	Best Supporting Actor	Anthony Hopkins	Nominated	
Critics' Choice Movie Awards	January 12, 2020	Best Adapted Screenplay	Anthony McCarten	Nominated	
Golden Globe Awards	January 5, 2020	Best Motion Picture – Drama	The Two Popes	Nominated	
Golden Globe Awards	January 5, 2020	Best Actor – Drama	Jonathan Pryce	Nominated	
Golden Globe Awards	January 5, 2020	Best Supporting Actor	Anthony Hopkins	Nominated	
Golden Globe Awards	January 5, 2020	Best Screenplay	Anthony McCarten	Nominated	
Hollywood Film Awards	November 3, 2019	Hollywood Screenwriter Award	Anthony McCarten	Won	
Satellite Awards	December 19, 2019	Best Motion Picture – Drama	The Two Popes	Nominated	
Satellite Awards	December 19, 2019	Best Supporting Actor	Anthony Hopkins	Nominated	
Satellite Awards	December 19, 2019	Best Adapted Screenplay	Anthony McCarten	Nominated	
Satellite Awards	December 19, 2019	Best Costume Design	Luka Canfora	Nominated	
Satellite Awards	December 19, 2019	Best Art Direction and Production Design	Mark Tildesley; Saverio Sammali	Nominated	

== Historical authenticity ==
Although much of the content is based on historic events, including speeches and philosophical debates that were published, most other aspects were fictionalized: "What you always do is you speculate", McCarten said in an interview with TheWrap. "Hopefully that speculation is based in facts and the truth, and hopefully it's inspired", he added.

In its coverage of the film, Time contended that the two popes' relationship has not been as smooth as in the fictionalized version. In April 2019, Pope Benedict released a 6,000-word letter blaming the clergy sex abuse scandal on factors including the "dangerously liberal theological ideas" within the Church. While the letter did not criticize Francis' papacy and concludes with: "At the end of my reflections I would like to thank Pope Francis for everything he does to show us, again and again, the light of God, which has not disappeared, even today. Thank you, Holy Father!", its content was described by The New York Times as "the most significant undercutting yet of the authority of Pope Francis". The Guardian also discussed a letter that Benedict had written, complimentary of Cardinal Joachim Meisner, who was an outspoken critic of Pope Francis, and added that a 2020 book partly authored by Benedict "was intervening to halt Pope Francis relaxing celibacy rules".

In one scene, Pope Benedict confesses to Bergoglio (Francis) and mentions Marcial Maciel before the audio fades out. The audience sees but does not hear the rest of his confession. J. Peter Nixon, in the publication U.S. Catholic, decried "the film's implication that it was Benedict who allowed Father Marcial Maciel Degollado to remain leader of the Legionaries of Christ despite mounting evidence that he was a sexual predator. It was during the papacy of Pope John Paul II, however, that efforts to investigate Maciel were repeatedly frustrated. It was Benedict who ultimately removed him."

A further, albeit minor, inaccuracy are the salient scenes in which the two namesake characters watch TV together: Pope Francis had claimed not to have watched any television broadcast since the 1990s.

Bishop Robert Barron criticized the film for its characterization of Benedict in an article on the Word on Fire website titled "The One Pope".

== Legacy ==
Following the death of Pope Francis in April 2025, the film quickly regained in popularity, with viewership on Netflix increasing 417 percent. A similar increase was seen for the 2024 film Conclave whose similar topic centers around the election of a new pope. Both movies were recommended by critics at The New York Times and San Francisco Chronicle shortly after Francis' death. Pryce gave his respects to the late pope.
