= Elena Andreicheva =

Ukrainian documentary film producer and director

- Олена Андрейчева
- Born: 1984 (age 41–42); Kiev, Ukrainian SSR, Soviet Union
- Education: Imperial College London
- Occupation: film producer
- Notable work: Learning to Skateboard in a Warzone (If You're a Girl)
- Awards: Academy Award Oscar for Best Documentary in a Short Subject (2019)

Elena Andreicheva (Ukrainian: Олена Андрейчева) is a Ukrainian-born producer and filmmaker based in the United Kingdom. Her work focuses primarily on documentary filmmaking, including the Oscar-winning short film, Learning to Skateboard in a Warzone (If You're a Girl) (2019).

== Biography ==
Andreicheva was born and raised in Kyiv, Ukraine. After graduating from a local school in 1995, she moved to the United Kingdom at the age of 11. Later, she studied physics at Imperial College London, graduating with a Bachelor of Science, and then a master's degree in Science Communication. Despite loving science and majoring in physics in college, she decided to study Science Communication in her master's program since she liked "writing and learning science more rather than being a scientist".

Andreicheva worked in the United Kingdom after graduating. She worked in TV film production beginning in 2006. She was assistant director to Rebecca Marshall on a documentary titled The Forest in Me. The film was shot in Siberia and followed seventy-year old Agafia Lykova, a woman living a two-weeks walk away from the nearest person, virtually a recluse from the Stalin era. She also helped fact check for Nick Rosen's book How to Live Off-Grid.

In 2016, Andreicheva was the director of a documentary titled Polish Go Home, about a "Polish job-seeker returning home from London to reconnect with his family". It was the first time she directed a film. Later, she was the producer of the 2019 documentary film Learning to Skateboard in a Warzone (If You're a Girl), for which she and Carol Dysinger won the (Oscar) Academy Award for Best Documentary Short Subject at the 92nd Academy Awards. Her Oscar outfit was made sustainably and she related that to her work "dealing with inequality and injustice". On winning the Oscar, she became the first female winner of Ukrainian origin since the country gained independence. She spoke at the Athens Science Festival in 2021 on how documentary film can help people understand science and technology.

In 2026, it was announced that Andreicheva directed and produced a new documentary, Intelligence Rising, which had its premiere in March in Denmark at the Copenhagen International Documentary Film Festival.

== Awards ==
| Year | Award | Category | Work | Result | Ref |
|---|---|---|---|---|---|
| 2019 | IDA Documentary Award | Best Short Documentary | Learning to Skateboard in a Warzone (If You're a Girl) | Won | |
| 2020 | BAFTA Award | British Short Film | Learning to Skateboard in a Warzone (If You're a Girl) | Won | |
| 2020 | Academy Award | Best Documentary (Short Subject) | Learning to Skateboard in a Warzone (If You're a Girl) | Won | |
