= Edward Watts (director) =

English filmmaker

Edward Watts is an English filmmaker who is known for making documentaries and narrative-focused films. He has created films in conjunction with UK television network Channel 4 and ITN Productions. He is known for films including For Sama (2019), Escape From ISIS (2015) and The Mega Brothel (2015).

He is the recipient of a number of awards including the Cannes Film Festival L'Œil d'or and the BAFTA Award for Best Documentary, both for For Sama. He received a nomination for the Academy Award for Best Documentary Feature for the same film.

== TV commissions ==
His 2015 film Escape From ISIS was commissioned by Channel 4 as part of their long-running current affairs documentary programme Dispatches. The film told the story of the treatment of women living under the Islamic State.

His film The Mega Brothel was also shown by Channel 4 in the same year, examining Germany's legalised sex worker industry.

== Awards ==
Escape From ISIS won the 2016 International Emmy Award For Current Affairs and was nominated for the 2016 BAFTA Award for Best Documentary.

For Sama won the L'Œil d'or prize for best documentary at the 2019 Cannes Film Festival, the Top Jury Prize at the 2019 Hot Docs Canadian International Documentary Festival and the 2019 South by Southwest Audience Award and Documentary Feature Award. It also won the BAFTA Award for Best Documentary and received a nomination for the Academy Award for Best Documentary Feature.
