= Carol Dysinger =

Film director and professor

- Occupations: Director, educator
- Known for: Learning to Skateboard in a Warzone (If You're a Girl)
- Awards: Oscar (2020) for Best Documentary (Short Subject); BAFTA (2020) for best short; Guggenheim Fellowship (2018)
- Website: Official website

Carol Dysinger is an American educator and director, best known for directing Learning to Skateboard in a Warzone (If You're a Girl), which won both an Oscar for Best Documentary (Short Subject) in 2020 and a BAFTA for best short. She teaches at the New York University Tisch School of the Arts.

== Career ==
Dysinger began filming on location in Afghanistan in 2005 in what would become her Afghan trilogy. Her first documentary, Camp Victory, Afghanistan completed in 2010, documents the struggles of national guard units training an Afghan National Army. When it premiered at the Lincoln Center in June 2010, Jim Dwyer of the New York Times wrote that the film "crackles with the emotional energy and intelligence of its subjects."

Dynsinger's short film on Afghan girls skateboarding in Kabul, Learning to Skateboard in a Warzone (If You're a Girl), received both a BAFTA for best short and an Oscar for best documentary (short subject). Dysinger's 2024 film One Bullet is her third documentary on Afghanistan and follows the story of a mother grieving her murdered son. The film premiered at DocEdge in Belgium and subsequently won best international documentary at the Galway Film Fleadh.

In 2018, Dysinger was awarded a Guggenheim Fellowship for her work on war and story. She currently works as an associate professor of film at New York University.
