= List of accolades received by Parasite =

Parasite accolades
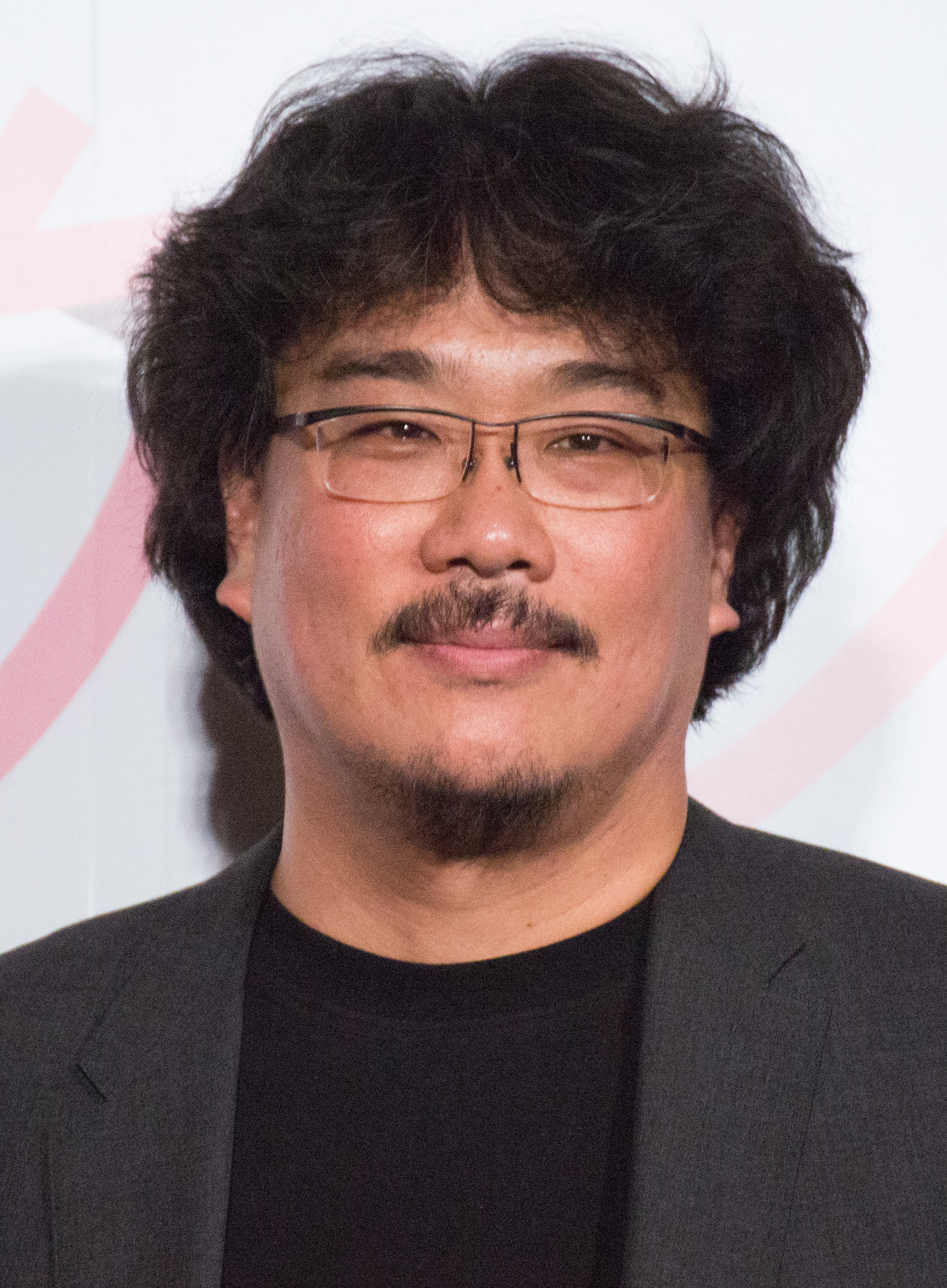
- Bong Joon-ho received multiple accolades for his direction and several more for co-writing the screenplay with Han Jin-won.
Accolades
Award	Wins	Nominations
AACTA Awards	1	1
AACTA International Awards	1	4
AARP Movies for Grownups Awards	0	2
Academy Awards	4	6
AFCA Film Awards	1	1
African-American Film Critics Association Awards	3	3
Alliance of Women Film Journalists EDA Awards	4	6
Amanda Awards	0	1
American Cinema Editors Eddie Awards	1	1
American Film Institute Awards	1	1
Art Directors Guild Awards	1	1
Asia Pacific Screen Awards	1	1
Asian Film Awards	4	10
Austin Film Critics Association Awards	5	9
Belgian Film Critics Association Awards	0	1
Baeksang Arts Awards	3	14
BFE Cut Above Awards	1	1
Blue Dragon Film Awards	5	12
Blue Ribbon Awards	1	1
Bodil Awards	1	1
Boston Society of Film Critics	3	3
British Academy Film Awards	2	4
British Academy Independent Film Awards	1	1
Buil Film Awards	6	11
Busan Film Critics Awards	1	1
Cahiers du Cinéma	1	1
Calgary International Film Festival Awards	1	1
Cannes Film Festival Awards	1	1
Capri Hollywood International Film Festival Awards	1	1
César Awards	1	1
Chicago Film Critics Association Awards	4	7
Chlotrudis Awards	4	6
Chunsa Film Art Awards	5	8
Cine21 Awards	6	6
Clio Awards	0	1
Crested Butte Film Festival Awards	1	1
Critics' Choice Movie Awards	2	7
Dallas–Fort Worth Film Critics Association Awards	4	4
David di Donatello Awards	1	1
Detroit Film Critics Society Awards	1	4
Director's Cut Awards	4	8
Directors Guild of America Awards	0	1
Dorian Awards	5	6
Dublin Film Critics' Circle Awards	1	1
Eurasia International Film Festival Awards	1	1
Fantastic Fest Awards	1	1
Films from the South Awards	1	1
Florida Film Critics Circle Awards	1	3
Fotogramas de Plata	1	1
French Syndicate of Cinema Critics Awards	1	1
Georgia Film Critics Association Awards	4	8
Globes de Cristal Awards	0	1
Golden Globe Awards	1	3
Golden Reel Awards	1	1
Golden Trailer Awards	1	5
Grand Bell Awards	5	11
Grande Prêmio do Cinema Brasileiro	1	1
Guinness World Records	2	2
Guldbagge Awards	1	1
Hochi Film Awards	0	1
Hollywood Critics Association Awards	3	6
Hollywood Film Awards	1	1
Hollywood Music in Media Awards	1	1
Hollywood Professional Association Awards	1	1
Houston Film Critics Society Awards	3	6
Huading Awards	1	4
Independent Spirit Awards	1	1
IndieWire Critics Poll	10	10
International Cinephile Society Awards	6	8
International Cinephile Society Cannes Awards	1	1
International Film Festival Cinematik Awards	1	1
International Film Festival Rotterdam Awards	1	1
Japan Academy Film Prize	1	1
Jecheon International Music & Film Festival	1	1
Kansas City Film Critics Circle Awards	4	4
Kinema Junpo Awards	3	3
Korean Association of Film Critics Awards	4	4
London Film Critics' Circle Awards	2	5
Los Angeles Film Critics Association Awards	5	5
Mainichi Film Awards	1	1
Munich International Film Festival	0	1
National Board of Review Awards	1	1
National Society of Film Critics Awards	4	4
New York Film Critics Circle Awards	1	1
New York Film Critics Online Awards	4	4
Nikkan Sports Film Awards	0	1
Online Film Critics Society Awards	6	7
Palm Springs International Film Festival Awards	1	2
Producers Guild of America Awards	0	1
Robert Awards	1	1
Rondo Hatton Classic Horror Awards	0	1
San Diego Film Critics Society Awards	1	2
San Francisco Bay Area Film Critics Circle Awards	3	7
San Sebastián International Film Festival Awards	0	1
Sant Jordi Awards	1	2
Santa Barbara International Film Festival Awards	1	1
São Paulo International Film Festival Awards	1	1
Satellite Awards	0	3
Saturn Awards	1	4
Screen Actors Guild Awards	1	1
Seattle Film Critics Society Awards	5	9
St. Louis Film Critics Association Awards	3	6
Sydney Film Festival Awards	1	1
Tallgrass Film Festival Awards	1	1
Toronto Film Critics Association Awards	4	4
Toronto International Film Festival Awards	1	1
Tromsø International Film Festival Awards	1	1
Turkish Film Critics Association Awards	1	1
Vancouver Film Critics Circle Awards	3	4
Vancouver International Film Festival Awards	1	1
Village Voice Film Poll	1	1
Washington D.C. Area Film Critics Association Awards	3	7
Writers Guild of America Awards	1	1

Totals (Note: Certain award groups do not simply award one winner. They acknowledge several different recipients, have runners-up, and have third place. Since this is a specific recognition and is different from losing an award, runner-up mentions are considered wins in this award tally. For simplification and to avoid errors, each award in this list has been presumed to have had a prior nomination.)
- Wins: 219
- Nominations: 353

Parasite is a 2019 South Korean black comedy thriller film directed by Bong Joon-ho, who co-wrote the screenplay with Han Jin-won. The film, which stars Song Kang-ho, Lee Sun-kyun, Cho Yeo-jeong, Choi Woo-shik, Park So-dam and Jang Hye-jin, follows a poor family as they get employed by a wealthy family and gradually infiltrate their household.

Parasite premiered at the 2019 Cannes Film Festival on 21 May 2019, where it became the first Korean film to win the Palme d'Or and the first film to do so with a unanimous vote since Blue Is the Warmest Colour in 2013. It was released in South Korea by CJ Entertainment on 30 May 2019, with releases in the rest of the world at the hands of various distributors following through the rest of 2019 and 2020. (Note: Several releases were delayed by the COVID-19 pandemic. The film's latest release was in Croatia on 9 September 2021.) The film screened at the 2019 Toronto International Film Festival in September 2019. In the United States, it had a limited release in Los Angeles and New York City on 11 October 2019, before expanding wider starting the following weekend. It was released in the United Kingdom on 7 February 2020. Produced on a budget of $11.4 million, the film grossed $262.1 million worldwide, becoming Bong's highest-grossing release and his first film to gross over $100 million globally. Parasite received widespread critical acclaim, with praise directed at its social commentary, direction, screenplay and production values. (Note: Attributed to multiple sources:) On the review aggregator website Rotten Tomatoes, the film holds an approval rating of 99% based on 485 reviews. It is considered one of the best films of 2019 and of the decade, appearing on and topping multiple critic lists for both categories.

Among its numerous accolades, Parasite won four awards – Best Picture, Best Director, Best Original Screenplay and Best International Feature Film (Note: Parasite was Bong's second selection for the award, after Mother in 2009.) – from six nominations at the 92nd Academy Awards. It became the first South Korean film to receive Academy Award recognition, as well as the first non-English-language film to win Best Picture. (Note: Although Parasite was the first film with a non-English script to win Best Picture at the Oscars, it is not to be confused with the first foreign film (produced by a company of a country that does not have English as its primary language) to win Best Picture, which was achieved by The Artist in 2012. The French-produced film was largely silent with French intertitles and contained a few spoken lines in English. The Academy dictates foreign language as the main qualification for international film, hence The Artist did not qualify. Moreover, while prior winners The Last Emperor and Slumdog Millionaire include significant amounts of non-English dialogue, they were considered domestic productions.) The film received four nominations at the 73rd British Academy Film Awards, including Best Film and Best Direction, and won Best Original Screenplay and Best Film Not in the English Language. At the 77th Golden Globe Awards, the film earned three nominations, winning Best Foreign Language Film. It was nominated in seven categories at the 25th Critics' Choice Awards, winning Best Director (Note: Tied with Sam Mendes for 1917) and Best Foreign Language Film. At the Screen Actors Guild Awards, it became the first foreign language film to win Outstanding Performance by a Cast in a Motion Picture. In addition, it was named Best Foreign Language Film by the National Board of Review and was awarded the AFI Special Award by the American Film Institute. (Note: The AFI Special Award gives recognition to media that falls outside the American Film Institute's eligibility criteria, such as non-American productions.)

== Accolades ==
Accolades received by the movie Parasite
Award	Date of ceremony	Category	Recipient(s)	Result	Ref.
AACTA Awards	4 December 2019	Best Asian Film	Parasite	Won	
AACTA International Awards	3 January 2020	Best Film	Parasite	Won	
AACTA International Awards	3 January 2020	Best Direction	Bong Joon-ho	Nominated	
AACTA International Awards	3 January 2020	Best Screenplay	Bong Joon-ho and Han Jin-won	Nominated	
AACTA International Awards	3 January 2020	Best Supporting Actor	Song Kang-ho	Nominated	
AARP Movies for Grownups Awards	January 11, 2020	Best Intergenerational Film	Parasite	Nominated	
AARP Movies for Grownups Awards	January 11, 2020	Best Foreign Film	Parasite	Nominated	
Academy Awards	9 February 2020	Best Picture	Kwak Sin-ae and Bong Joon-ho	Won	
Academy Awards	9 February 2020	Best Director	Bong Joon-ho	Won	
Academy Awards	9 February 2020	Best Original Screenplay	Bong Joon-ho and Han Jin-won	Won	
Academy Awards	9 February 2020	Best International Feature Film	Parasite (South Korea)	Won	
Academy Awards	9 February 2020	Best Film Editing	Yang Jin-mo	Nominated	
Academy Awards	9 February 2020	Best Production Design	Lee Ha-jun and Cho Won-woo	Nominated	
AFCA Film Awards	7 February 2020	Best International Film (Foreign Language)	Parasite	Won	
African-American Film Critics Association Awards	10 December 2019	Top Ten Films	Parasite	8th Place (Note: Tied with Atlantics)	
African-American Film Critics Association Awards	10 December 2019	Best Screenplay	Bong Joon-ho and Han Jin-won	Won	
African-American Film Critics Association Awards	10 December 2019	Best Foreign Film	Parasite	Won	
Alliance of Women Film Journalists EDA Awards	10 January 2020	Best Film	Parasite	Won	
Alliance of Women Film Journalists EDA Awards	10 January 2020	Best Director	Bong Joon-ho	Won	
Alliance of Women Film Journalists EDA Awards	10 January 2020	Best Original Screenplay	Bong Joon-ho and Han Jin-won	Won	
Alliance of Women Film Journalists EDA Awards	10 January 2020	Best Ensemble	Parasite	Nominated	
Alliance of Women Film Journalists EDA Awards	10 January 2020	Best Editing	Yang Jin-mo	Nominated	
Alliance of Women Film Journalists EDA Awards	10 January 2020	Best Non-English Language Film	Parasite	Won	
Amanda Awards	14 August 2020	Best Foreign Feature Film	Parasite	Nominated	
American Cinema Editors Eddie Awards	17 January 2020	Best Edited Feature Film – Dramatic	Yang Jin-mo	Won	
American Film Institute Awards	3 January 2020	AFI Special Award	Parasite	Won (Note: Also awarded to Fleabag)	
Art Directors Guild Awards	1 February 2020	Excellence in Production Design for a Contemporary Feature Film	Lee Ha-jun	Won	
Asia Pacific Screen Awards	21 November 2019	Best Feature Film	Parasite	Won	
Asian Film Awards	28 October 2020	Best Film	Parasite	Won	
Asian Film Awards	28 October 2020	Best Director	Bong Joon-ho	Nominated	
Asian Film Awards	28 October 2020	Best Supporting Actor	Choi Woo-shik	Nominated	
Asian Film Awards	28 October 2020	Best Supporting Actress	Lee Jung-eun	Nominated	
Asian Film Awards	28 October 2020	Best Screenplay	Bong Joon-ho and Han Jin-won	Won	
Asian Film Awards	28 October 2020	Best Original Music	Jung Jae-il	Nominated	
Asian Film Awards	28 October 2020	Best Editing	Yang Jin-mo	Won	
Asian Film Awards	28 October 2020	Best Production Design	Lee Ha-jun	Won	
Asian Film Awards	28 October 2020	Best Sound	Choi Tae-young	Nominated	
Asian Film Awards	28 October 2020	Best Visual Effects	Hong Jeong-ho	Nominated	
Austin Film Critics Association Awards	7 January 2020	Best Film	Parasite	Won	
Austin Film Critics Association Awards	7 January 2020	Top 10 Films of the Decade	Parasite	7th Place	
Austin Film Critics Association Awards	7 January 2020	Best Director	Bong Joon-ho	Won	
Austin Film Critics Association Awards	7 January 2020	Best Supporting Actor	Song Kang-ho	Nominated	
Austin Film Critics Association Awards	7 January 2020	Best Ensemble	Parasite	Nominated	
Austin Film Critics Association Awards	7 January 2020	Best Original Screenplay	Bong Joon-ho and Han Jin-won	Won	
Austin Film Critics Association Awards	7 January 2020	Best Foreign Language Film	Parasite	Won	
Austin Film Critics Association Awards	7 January 2020	Best Cinematography	Hong Kyung-pyo	Nominated	
Austin Film Critics Association Awards	7 January 2020	Best Editing	Yang Jin-mo	Nominated	
Belgian Film Critics Association Awards	4 January 2020	Grand Prix	Parasite	Nominated	
Baeksang Arts Awards	5 June 2020	Grand Prize (Daesang)	Parasite	Nominated	
Baeksang Arts Awards	5 June 2020	Grand Prize (Daesang)	Bong Joon-ho	Won	
Baeksang Arts Awards	5 June 2020	Best Film	Parasite	Won	
Baeksang Arts Awards	5 June 2020	Best Director	Bong Joon-ho	Nominated	
Baeksang Arts Awards	5 June 2020	Best Actor	Song Kang-ho	Nominated	
Baeksang Arts Awards	5 June 2020	Best Actress	Cho Yeo-jeong	Nominated	
Baeksang Arts Awards	5 June 2020	Best Supporting Actor	Park Myung-hoon	Nominated	
Baeksang Arts Awards	5 June 2020	Best Supporting Actress	Lee Jung-eun	Nominated	
Baeksang Arts Awards	5 June 2020	Best Supporting Actress	Park So-dam	Nominated	
Baeksang Arts Awards	5 June 2020	Best New Actor	Park Myung-hoon	Won	
Baeksang Arts Awards	5 June 2020	Best New Actress	Jang Hye-jin	Nominated	
Baeksang Arts Awards	5 June 2020	Best Screenplay	Bong Joon-ho and Han Jin-won	Nominated	
Baeksang Arts Awards	5 June 2020	Technical Award	Hong Kyung-pyo	Nominated	
Baeksang Arts Awards	5 June 2020	Technical Award	Lee Ha-jun	Nominated	
BFE Cut Above Awards	5 March 2021	Best Edited Single Drama	Yang Jin-mo	Won	
Blue Dragon Film Awards	21 November 2019	Best Film	Parasite	Won	
Blue Dragon Film Awards	21 November 2019	Best Director	Bong Joon-ho	Won	
Blue Dragon Film Awards	21 November 2019	Best Actor	Song Kang-ho	Nominated	
Blue Dragon Film Awards	21 November 2019	Best Actress	Cho Yeo-jeong	Won	
Blue Dragon Film Awards	21 November 2019	Best Supporting Actor	Park Myung-hoon	Nominated	
Blue Dragon Film Awards	21 November 2019	Best Supporting Actress	Lee Jung-eun	Won	
Blue Dragon Film Awards	21 November 2019	Best Supporting Actress	Park So-dam	Nominated	
Blue Dragon Film Awards	21 November 2019	Best Screenplay	Bong Joon-ho and Han Jin-won	Nominated	
Blue Dragon Film Awards	21 November 2019	Best Cinematography and Lighting	Hong Kyung-pyo and Kim Chang-ho	Nominated	
Blue Dragon Film Awards	21 November 2019	Best Editing	Yang Jin-mo	Nominated	
Blue Dragon Film Awards	21 November 2019	Best Music	Jung Jae-il	Nominated	
Blue Dragon Film Awards	21 November 2019	Best Art Direction	Lee Ha-jun	Won	
Blue Ribbon Awards	23 February 2021	Best Foreign Film	Parasite	Won	
Bodil Awards	29 February 2020	Best Non-American Film	Parasite	Won	
Boston Society of Film Critics	15 December 2019	Best Foreign Language Film	Parasite	Won	
Boston Society of Film Critics	15 December 2019	Best Director	Bong Joon-ho	Won	
Boston Society of Film Critics	15 December 2019	Best Ensemble Cast	Parasite	Runner-up (Note: Tied with Once Upon a Time in Hollywood)	
British Academy Film Awards	2 February 2020	Best Film	Kwak Sin-ae and Bong Joon-ho	Nominated	
British Academy Film Awards	2 February 2020	Best Director	Bong Joon-ho	Nominated	
British Academy Film Awards	2 February 2020	Best Original Screenplay	Bong Joon-ho and Han Jin-won	Won	
British Academy Film Awards	2 February 2020	Best Film Not in the English Language	Bong Joon-ho	Won	
British Independent Film Awards	1 December 2019	Best International Independent Film	Parasite	Won	
Buil Film Awards	4 October 2019	Best Film	Parasite	Won	
Buil Film Awards	4 October 2019	Best Director	Bong Joon-ho	Nominated	
Buil Film Awards	4 October 2019	Best Screenplay	Bong Joon-ho and Han Jin-won	Won	
Buil Film Awards	4 October 2019	Best Actor	Choi Woo-shik	Nominated	
Buil Film Awards	4 October 2019	Best Actress	Cho Yeo-jeong	Nominated	
Buil Film Awards	4 October 2019	Best Supporting Actor	Park Myung-hoon	Won	
Buil Film Awards	4 October 2019	Best Supporting Actress	Jang Hye-jin	Nominated	
Buil Film Awards	4 October 2019	Best Supporting Actress	Lee Jung-eun	Won	
Buil Film Awards	4 October 2019	Best Cinematography	Hong Kyung-pyo	Won	
Buil Film Awards	4 October 2019	Best Art Direction	Lee Ha-jun	Nominated	
Buil Film Awards	4 October 2019	Best Music	Jung Jae-il	Won	
Busan Film Critics Awards	26 November 2019	Best Actress	Lee Jung-eun	Won	
Cahiers du Cinéma	6 January 2020	Top 10 Lists	Parasite	Runner-up	
Calgary International Film Festival Awards	3 October 2019	Fan Favourite Award	Parasite	Won	
Cannes Film Festival Awards	25 May 2019	Palme d'Or	Bong Joon-ho	Won	
Capri Hollywood International Film Festival Awards	2 January 2020	Best Foreign Language Film	Parasite	Won	
César Awards	28 February 2020	Best Foreign Film	Parasite	Won	
Chicago Film Critics Association Awards	14 December 2019	Best Director	Bong Joon-ho	Won	
Chicago Film Critics Association Awards	14 December 2019	Best Film	Parasite	Won	
Chicago Film Critics Association Awards	14 December 2019	Best Supporting Actress	Cho Yeo-jeong	Nominated	
Chicago Film Critics Association Awards	14 December 2019	Best Original Screenplay	Bong Joon-ho and Han Jin-won	Won	
Chicago Film Critics Association Awards	14 December 2019	Best Art Direction	Parasite	Nominated	
Chicago Film Critics Association Awards	14 December 2019	Best Cinematography	Hong Kyung-pyo	Nominated	
Chicago Film Critics Association Awards	14 December 2019	Best Foreign Language Film	Parasite	Won	
Chlotrudis Awards	25 March 2020	Best Movie	Parasite	Won	
Chlotrudis Awards	25 March 2020	Best Director	Bong Joon-ho	Won (Note: Tied with Ísold Uggadóttir for And Breathe Normally)	
Chlotrudis Awards	25 March 2020	Performance by an Ensemble Cast	Parasite	Won	
Chlotrudis Awards	25 March 2020	Best Original Screenplay	Bong Joon-ho and Han Jin-won	Won	
Chlotrudis Awards	25 March 2020	Best Editing	Yang Jin-mo	Nominated	
Chlotrudis Awards	25 March 2020	Best Production Design	Lee Ha-jun	Nominated	
Chunsa Film Art Awards	18 July 2019	Best Director	Bong Joon-ho	Won	
Chunsa Film Art Awards	18 July 2019	Best Screenplay	Bong Joon-ho and Han Jin-won	Won	
Chunsa Film Art Awards	18 July 2019	Best Actor	Choi Woo-shik	Nominated	
Chunsa Film Art Awards	18 July 2019	Best Actor	Song Kang-ho	Nominated	
Chunsa Film Art Awards	18 July 2019	Best Actress	Cho Yeo-jeong	Won	
Chunsa Film Art Awards	18 July 2019	Best Supporting Actor	Park Myung-hoon	Nominated	
Chunsa Film Art Awards	18 July 2019	Best Supporting Actress	Lee Jung-eun	Won	
Chunsa Film Art Awards	19 June 2020	White Crane Award	Bong Joon-ho	Won	
Cine21 Awards	24 December 2019	Best Film of The Year	Parasite	Won	
Cine21 Awards	24 December 2019	Best Director of The Year	Bong Joon-ho	Won	
Cine21 Awards	24 December 2019	Best Actor of The Year	Song Kang-ho	Won	
Cine21 Awards	24 December 2019	Best Actress of The Year	Lee Jung-eun	Won	
Cine21 Awards	24 December 2019	Best Screenplay of The Year	Bong Joon-ho and Han Jin-won	Won	
Cine21 Awards	24 December 2019	Best Cinematographer of The Year	Hong Kyung-pyo	Won	
Clio Awards	21 November 2019	Theatrical: Trailers	Parasite (for "Plan")	Nominated	
Crested Butte Film Festival Awards	29 September 2019	Best Narrative Film	Parasite	Won	
Critics' Choice Movie Awards	12 January 2020	Best Picture	Parasite	Nominated	
Critics' Choice Movie Awards	12 January 2020	Best Director	Bong Joon-ho	Won	
Critics' Choice Movie Awards	12 January 2020	Best Acting Ensemble	Parasite	Nominated	
Critics' Choice Movie Awards	12 January 2020	Best Original Screenplay	Bong Joon-ho and Han Jin-won	Nominated	
Critics' Choice Movie Awards	12 January 2020	Best Production Design	Lee Ha-jun	Nominated	
Critics' Choice Movie Awards	12 January 2020	Best Foreign Language Film	Parasite	Won	
Critics' Choice Movie Awards	12 January 2020	Best Editing	Yang Jin-mo	Nominated	
Dallas–Fort Worth Film Critics Association Awards	16 December 2019	Best Film	Parasite	3rd Place	
Dallas–Fort Worth Film Critics Association Awards	16 December 2019	Best Director	Bong Joon-ho	Runner-up	
Dallas–Fort Worth Film Critics Association Awards	16 December 2019	Best Foreign Language Film	Parasite	Won	
Dallas–Fort Worth Film Critics Association Awards	16 December 2019	Best Cinematography	Hong Kyung-pyo	Runner-up	
David di Donatello Awards	8 May 2020	Best Foreign Film	Parasite	Won	
Detroit Film Critics Society Awards	9 December 2019	Best Film	Parasite	Won	
Detroit Film Critics Society Awards	9 December 2019	Best Director	Bong Joon-ho	Nominated	
Detroit Film Critics Society Awards	9 December 2019	Best Screenplay	Bong Joon-ho and Han Jin-won	Nominated	
Detroit Film Critics Society Awards	9 December 2019	Best Ensemble	Parasite	Nominated	
Director's Cut Awards	12 December 2019	Best Director	Bong Joon-ho	Won	
Director's Cut Awards	12 December 2019	Best Actor	Choi Woo-shik	Nominated	
Director's Cut Awards	12 December 2019	Best Actor	Song Kang-ho	Won	
Director's Cut Awards	12 December 2019	Best Actress	Lee Jung-eun	Nominated	
Director's Cut Awards	12 December 2019	Best Actress	Cho Yeo-jeong	Nominated	
Director's Cut Awards	12 December 2019	Best Screenplay	Bong Joon-ho and Han Jin-won	Won	
Director's Cut Awards	12 December 2019	Best New Actor	Park Myung-hoon	Won	
Director's Cut Awards	12 December 2019	Best New Actress	Jang Hye-jin	Nominated	
Directors Guild of America Awards	25 January 2020	Outstanding Directorial Achievement in Feature Film	Bong Joon-ho	Nominated	
Dorian Awards	8 January 2020	Film of the Year	Parasite	Won	
Dorian Awards	8 January 2020	Director of the Year	Bong Joon-ho	Won	
Dorian Awards	8 January 2020	Supporting Film Performance of the Year — Actor	Song Kang-ho	Won	
Dorian Awards	8 January 2020	Foreign Language Film of the Year	Parasite	Won	
Dorian Awards	8 January 2020	Screenplay of the Year	Bong Joon-ho and Han Jin-won	Won	
Dorian Awards	8 January 2020	Visually Striking Film of the Year	Parasite	Nominated	
Dublin Film Critics' Circle Awards	18 December 2020	Best Director	Bong Joon-ho	Won	
Eurasia International Film Festival Awards	6 July 2019	Best Director	Bong Joon-ho	Won	
Fantastic Fest Awards	25 September 2019	Audience Award	Parasite	Won	
Films from the South Awards	16 November 2019	Audience Award	Parasite	Won	
Florida Film Critics Circle Awards	23 December 2019	Best Foreign Language Film	Parasite	Runner-up	
Florida Film Critics Circle Awards	23 December 2019	Best Ensemble	Parasite	Nominated	
Florida Film Critics Circle Awards	23 December 2019	Best Original Screenplay	Bong Joon-ho and Han Jin-won	Nominated	
Fotogramas de Plata	12 November 2019	Best Foreign Film	Parasite	Won	
French Syndicate of Cinema Critics Awards	23 January 2020	Best Foreign Film	Parasite	Won	
Georgia Film Critics Association Awards	10 January 2020	Best Picture	Parasite	Won	
Georgia Film Critics Association Awards	10 January 2020	Best Director	Bong Joon-ho	Won	
Georgia Film Critics Association Awards	10 January 2020	Best Original Screenplay	Bong Joon-ho and Han Jin-won	Won	
Georgia Film Critics Association Awards	10 January 2020	Best Production Design	Lee Ha-jun	Nominated	
Georgia Film Critics Association Awards	10 January 2020	Best Original Score	Jung Jae-il	Nominated	
Georgia Film Critics Association Awards	10 January 2020	Best Original Song	Jung Jae-il and Bong Joon-ho (for "A Glass of Soju")	Nominated	
Georgia Film Critics Association Awards	10 January 2020	Best Ensemble	Parasite	Nominated	
Georgia Film Critics Association Awards	10 January 2020	Best Foreign Language Film	Parasite	Won	
Globe de Cristal Awards	No Date (Note: The ceremony was supposed to be held on 14 March 2020, but was indefinitely cancelled due to the COVID-19 pandemic.)	Best Foreign Film	Parasite	Nominated	
Golden Globe Awards	5 January 2020	Best Director	Bong Joon-ho	Nominated	
Golden Globe Awards	5 January 2020	Best Screenplay	Bong Joon-ho and Han Jin-won	Nominated	
Golden Globe Awards	5 January 2020	Best Foreign Language Film	Parasite	Won	
Golden Reel Awards	19 January 2020	Outstanding Achievement in Sound Editing – Sound Effects, Foley, Dialogue and ADR for Foreign Language Feature Film	Choi Tae-young, Kang Hye-young, Kim Byung-in, Park Sung-gyun, Lee Chung-gyu and Shin I-na	Won	
Golden Trailer Awards	July 22, 2021	Best Independent Trailer	Neon and ZEALOT (for "Plan")	Nominated	
Golden Trailer Awards	July 22, 2021	Best Foreign Independent Trailer	Neon and Jump Cut	Won	
Golden Trailer Awards	July 22, 2021	Best Graphics in a TV Spot (for a Feature Film)	Neon and ZEALOT (for "No Plan")	Nominated	
Golden Trailer Awards	July 22, 2021	Best Independent TV Spot (for a Feature Film)	Curzon and Silk Factory (for "Amazing")	Nominated	
Golden Trailer Awards	July 22, 2021	Best Motion Title/Graphics	Neon and ZEALOT (for "Plan")	Nominated	
Grand Bell Awards	3 June 2020	Best Film	Parasite	Won	
Grand Bell Awards	3 June 2020	Best Director	Bong Joon-ho	Won	
Grand Bell Awards	3 June 2020	Best Actor	Song Kang-ho	Nominated	
Grand Bell Awards	3 June 2020	Best Supporting Actor	Park Myung-hoon	Nominated	
Grand Bell Awards	3 June 2020	Best Supporting Actress	Lee Jung-eun	Won	
Grand Bell Awards	3 June 2020	Best Screenplay	Bong Joon-ho and Han Jin-won	Won	
Grand Bell Awards	3 June 2020	Best Cinematography	Hong Kyung-pyo	Nominated	
Grand Bell Awards	3 June 2020	Best Film Editing	Yang Jin-mo	Nominated	
Grand Bell Awards	3 June 2020	Best Lighting	Kim Chang-ho	Nominated	
Grand Bell Awards	3 June 2020	Best Music	Jung Jae-il	Won	
Grand Bell Awards	3 June 2020	Best Art Direction	Lee Ha-jun	Nominated	
Grande Prêmio do Cinema Brasileiro	11 October 2020	Best Foreign Film	Parasite	Won	
Guinness World Records	2020	First film to win both the Best International Feature Film and Best Picture Oscar	Parasite	Won	
Guinness World Records	2020	Most Oscar wins for an international feature film	Parasite	Won (Note: Jointly held by Fanny and Alexander (56th Academy Awards), Crouching Tiger, Hidden Dragon (73rd Academy Awards), Parasite (92nd Academy Awards). This record was also tied by All Quiet on the Western Front at the 95th Academy Awards.)	
Guldbagge Awards	20 January 2020	Best Foreign Film	Parasite	Won	
Hochi Film Awards	2 December 2020	Best Foreign Film	Parasite	Nominated	
Hollywood Critics Association Awards	9 January 2020	Best Picture	Parasite	Nominated	
Hollywood Critics Association Awards	9 January 2020	Best Male Director	Bong Joon-ho	Nominated	
Hollywood Critics Association Awards	9 January 2020	Best Original Screenplay	Bong Joon-ho and Han Jin-won	Won	
Hollywood Critics Association Awards	9 January 2020	Best Editing	Yang Jin-mo	Nominated	
Hollywood Critics Association Awards	9 January 2020	Filmmaker Achievement Award	Bong Joon-ho	Won	
Hollywood Critics Association Awards	9 January 2020	Best Foreign Language Film	Parasite	Won	
Hollywood Film Awards	3 November 2019	Hollywood Filmmaker Award	Bong Joon-ho	Won	
Hollywood Music in Media Awards	20 November 2019	Best Original Score in a Feature Film	Jung Jae-il	Nominated	
Hollywood Professional Association Awards	19 November 2020	Outstanding Editing – Feature Film	Yang Jin-mo	Won	
Houston Film Critics Society Awards	2 January 2020	Best Picture	Parasite	Won	
Houston Film Critics Society Awards	2 January 2020	Best Foreign Language Film	Parasite	Won	
Houston Film Critics Society Awards	2 January 2020	Best Director	Bong Joon-ho	Won	
Houston Film Critics Society Awards	2 January 2020	Best Screenplay	Bong Joon-ho and Han Jin-won	Nominated	
Houston Film Critics Society Awards	2 January 2020	Best Cinematography	Hong Kyung-pyo	Nominated	
Houston Film Critics Society Awards	2 January 2020	Best Movie Poster Art	Parasite	Nominated	
Huading Awards	29 October 2020	Best Global Motion Picture	Parasite	Nominated	
Huading Awards	29 October 2020	Best Global Director for a Motion Picture	Bong Joon-ho	Won	
Huading Awards	29 October 2020	Best Global Writing for a Motion Picture	Bong Joon-ho and Han Jin-won	Nominated	
Huading Awards	29 October 2020	Best Global Supporting Actress in a Motion Picture	Park So-dam	Nominated	
Independent Spirit Awards	8 February 2020	Best International Film	Parasite	Won	
IndieWire Critics Poll	16 December 2019	Best Film	Parasite	Won	
IndieWire Critics Poll	16 December 2019	Best Director	Bong Joon-ho	Won	
IndieWire Critics Poll	16 December 2019	Best Screenplay	Bong Joon-ho and Han Jin-won	Won	
IndieWire Critics Poll	16 December 2019	Best Supporting Actor	Song Kang-ho	5th Place	
IndieWire Critics Poll	16 December 2019	Best Actor	Song Kang-ho	9th Place	
IndieWire Critics Poll	16 December 2019	Best Supporting Actress	Park So-dam	10th Place	
IndieWire Critics Poll	16 December 2019	Best Supporting Actress	Cho Yeo-jeong	15th Place	
IndieWire Critics Poll	16 December 2019	Best Supporting Actress	Lee Jung-eun	22nd Place	
IndieWire Critics Poll	16 December 2019	Best Cinematography	Hong Kyung-pyo	5th Place	
IndieWire Critics Poll	16 December 2019	Best Foreign Film	Parasite	Won	
International Cinephile Society Awards	5 February 2020	Best Picture	Parasite	Runner-up	
International Cinephile Society Awards	5 February 2020	Best Director	Bong Joon-ho	Nominated	
International Cinephile Society Awards	5 February 2020	Best Original Screenplay	Bong Joon-ho and Han Jin-won	Won	
International Cinephile Society Awards	5 February 2020	Best Supporting Actor	Song Kang-ho	Nominated	
International Cinephile Society Awards	5 February 2020	Best Supporting Actress	Cho Yeo-jeong	Runner-up	
International Cinephile Society Awards	5 February 2020	Best Ensemble	Parasite	Won	
International Cinephile Society Awards	5 February 2020	Best Editing	Yang Jin-mo	Runner-up	
International Cinephile Society Awards	5 February 2020	Best Production Design	Lee Ha-jun	Won	
International Cinephile Society Cannes Awards	25 May 2019	Best Director	Bong Joon-ho	Won	
International Film Festival Cinematik Awards	15 September 2019	Audience Award	Parasite	Won	
International Film Festival Rotterdam Awards	31 January 2020	BankGiro Loterij Audience Award	Parasite (B&W Version)	Won	
Japan Academy Film Prize	19 March 2021	Outstanding Foreign Language Film	Parasite	Won	
Jecheon International Music & Film Festival	9 August 2019	Person of the Year in Film Industry Award	Bong Joon-ho	Won	
Kansas City Film Critics Circle Awards	15 December 2019	Best Film	Parasite	Runner-up	
Kansas City Film Critics Circle Awards	15 December 2019	Best Director	Bong Joon-ho	Runner-up	
Kansas City Film Critics Circle Awards	15 December 2019	Best Original Screenplay	Bong Joon-ho and Han Jin-won	Runner-up	
Kansas City Film Critics Circle Awards	15 December 2019	Best Foreign Language Film	Parasite	Won	
Kinema Junpo Awards	10 February 2021	Best Foreign Language Film	Parasite	Won	
Kinema Junpo Awards	10 February 2021	Best Foreign Language Film Director	Bong Joon-ho	Won	
Kinema Junpo Awards	10 February 2021	Readers’ Choice Best Foreign Language Film Director	Bong Joon-ho	Won	
Korean Association of Film Critics Awards	13 November 2019	Best Film	Parasite	Won	
Korean Association of Film Critics Awards	13 November 2019	Top 10 Films of the Year	Parasite	Won (Note: This award does not have a single winner, but recognizes multiple films.)	
Korean Association of Film Critics Awards	13 November 2019	Best Director	Bong Joon-ho	Won	
Korean Association of Film Critics Awards	13 November 2019	Best Cinematography	Hong Kyung-pyo	Won	
London Film Critics' Circle Awards	30 January 2020	Film of the Year	Parasite	Won	
London Film Critics' Circle Awards	30 January 2020	Director of the Year	Bong Joon-ho	Won	
London Film Critics' Circle Awards	30 January 2020	Screenwriter of the Year	Bong Joon-ho and Han Jin-won	Nominated	
London Film Critics' Circle Awards	30 January 2020	Foreign Language Film of the Year	Parasite	Nominated	
London Film Critics' Circle Awards	30 January 2020	Technical Achievement Award	Lee Ha-jun	Nominated	
Los Angeles Film Critics Association Awards	11 January 2020	Best Film	Parasite	Won	
Los Angeles Film Critics Association Awards	11 January 2020	Best Director	Bong Joon-ho	Won	
Los Angeles Film Critics Association Awards	11 January 2020	Best Supporting Actor	Song Kang-ho	Won	
Los Angeles Film Critics Association Awards	11 January 2020	Best Screenplay	Bong Joon-ho and Han Jin-won	Runner-up	
Los Angeles Film Critics Association Awards	11 January 2020	Best Production Design	Lee Ha-jun	Runner-up	
Mainichi Film Awards	17 February 2021	Foreign Film Best One Award	Parasite	Won	
Munich International Film Festival	6 July 2019	CineMasters Award	Parasite	Nominated	
National Board of Review Awards	3 December 2019	Best Foreign Language Film	Parasite	Won	
National Society of Film Critics Awards	4 January 2020	Best Picture	Parasite	Won	
National Society of Film Critics Awards	4 January 2020	Best Director	Bong Joon-ho	Runner-up	
National Society of Film Critics Awards	4 January 2020	Best Supporting Actor	Song Kang-ho	3rd Place (Note: Tied with Wesley Snipes for Dolemite Is My Name)	
National Society of Film Critics Awards	4 January 2020	Best Screenplay	Bong Joon-ho and Han Jin-won	Won	
New York Film Critics Circle Awards	7 January 2020	Best Foreign Language Film	Parasite	Won	
New York Film Critics Online Awards	7 December 2019	Best Film	Parasite	Won	
New York Film Critics Online Awards	7 December 2019	Top 10 Films of the Year	Parasite	Won	
New York Film Critics Online Awards	7 December 2019	Best Director	Bong Joon-ho	Won	
New York Film Critics Online Awards	7 December 2019	Best Screenplay	Bong Joon-ho and Han Jin-won	Won	
Nikkan Sports Film Awards	28 December 2020	Best Foreign Film	Parasite	Nominated	
Online Film Critics Society Awards	6 January 2020	Best Picture	Parasite	Won	
Online Film Critics Society Awards	6 January 2020	Best Director	Bong Joon-ho	Won	
Online Film Critics Society Awards	6 January 2020	Best Supporting Actor	Song Kang-ho	Nominated	
Online Film Critics Society Awards	6 January 2020	Best Original Screenplay	Bong Joon-ho and Han Jin-won	Won	
Online Film Critics Society Awards	6 January 2020	Best Editing	Yang Jin-mo	Won	
Online Film Critics Society Awards	6 January 2020	Best Film Not in the English Language	Parasite	Won	
Online Film Critics Society Awards	6 January 2020	Technical Achievement Award – Best Production Design	Parasite	Won (Note: Also awarded to 1917)	
Palm Springs International Film Festival Awards	13 January 2020	FIPRESCI Prize for Best International Screenplay	Bong Joon-ho and Han Jin-won	Won	
Palm Springs International Film Festival Awards	13 January 2020	FIPRESCI Prize for Best Foreign Language Film	Parasite	Nominated	
Producers Guild of America Awards	18 January 2020	Best Theatrical Motion Picture	Kwak Sin-ae and Bong Joon-ho	Nominated	
Robert Awards	26 January 2020	Best Non-English Language Film	Parasite	Won	
Rondo Hatton Classic Horror Awards	6 April 2020	Best Film	Parasite	Nominated	
San Diego Film Critics Society Awards	December 9, 2019	Best Original Screenplay	Bong Joon-ho and Han Jin-won	Nominated	
San Diego Film Critics Society Awards	December 9, 2019	Best Foreign Language Film	Parasite	Won	
San Francisco Bay Area Film Critics Circle Awards	16 December 2019	Best Picture	Parasite	Nominated	
San Francisco Bay Area Film Critics Circle Awards	16 December 2019	Best Director	Bong Joon-ho	Won	
San Francisco Bay Area Film Critics Circle Awards	16 December 2019	Best Original Screenplay	Bong Joon-ho and Han Jin-won	Won	
San Francisco Bay Area Film Critics Circle Awards	16 December 2019	Best Supporting Actor	Song Kang-ho	Nominated	
San Francisco Bay Area Film Critics Circle Awards	16 December 2019	Best Foreign Language Film	Parasite	Won	
San Francisco Bay Area Film Critics Circle Awards	16 December 2019	Best Production Design	Lee Ha-jun	Nominated	
San Francisco Bay Area Film Critics Circle Awards	16 December 2019	Best Editing	Yang Jin-mo	Nominated	
San Sebastián International Film Festival Awards	20 September 2019	FIPRESCI Grand Prix	Parasite	Nominated	
Sant Jordi Awards	22 June 2020	Best Foreign Film	Parasite	Nominated	
Sant Jordi Awards	22 June 2020	Rosa de Sant Jordi Award – Best Foreign Film	Parasite	Won	
Santa Barbara International Film Festival Awards	23 January 2020	Outstanding Director of the Year	Bong Joon-ho	Won	
São Paulo International Film Festival Awards	30 October 2019	Audience Award ― Best International Fiction Film	Parasite	Won	
Satellite Awards	19 December 2019	Best Director	Bong Joon-ho	Nominated	
Satellite Awards	19 December 2019	Best Original Screenplay	Bong Joon-ho and Han Jin-won	Nominated	
Satellite Awards	19 December 2019	Best Foreign Language Film	Parasite	Nominated	
Saturn Awards	26 October 2021	Best Writing	Bong Joon-ho and Han Jin-won	Nominated	
Saturn Awards	26 October 2021	Best Editing	Yang Jin-mo	Nominated	
Saturn Awards	26 October 2021	Best Music	Jung Jae-il	Nominated	
Saturn Awards	26 October 2021	Best International Film	Parasite	Won	
Screen Actors Guild Awards	19 January 2020	Outstanding Performance by a Cast in a Motion Picture	Jang Hye-jin, Cho Yeo-jeong, Choi Woo-shik, Jung Hyeon-jun, Jung Ziso, Lee Jung-eun, Lee Sun-kyun, Park Myung-hoon, Park So-dam and Song Kang-ho	Won	
Seattle Film Critics Society Awards	16 December 2019	Best Picture	Parasite	Won	
Seattle Film Critics Society Awards	16 December 2019	Best Director	Bong Joon-ho	Won	
Seattle Film Critics Society Awards	16 December 2019	Best Actor in a Supporting Role	Song Kang-ho	Nominated	
Seattle Film Critics Society Awards	16 December 2019	Best Ensemble Cast	Parasite	Won	
Seattle Film Critics Society Awards	16 December 2019	Best Screenplay	Bong Joon-ho and Han Jin-won	Won	
Seattle Film Critics Society Awards	16 December 2019	Best Editing	Yang Jin-mo	Nominated	
Seattle Film Critics Society Awards	16 December 2019	Best Cinematography	Hong Kyung-pyo	Nominated	
Seattle Film Critics Society Awards	16 December 2019	Best Production Design	Lee Ha-jun	Nominated	
Seattle Film Critics Society Awards	16 December 2019	Best Foreign Language Film	Parasite	Won	
St. Louis Film Critics Association Awards	15 December 2019	Best Director	Bong Joon-ho	Runner-up	
St. Louis Film Critics Association Awards	15 December 2019	Best Original Screenplay	Bong Joon-ho and Han Jin-won	Nominated	
St. Louis Film Critics Association Awards	15 December 2019	Best Horror Film	Parasite	Runner-up	
St. Louis Film Critics Association Awards	15 December 2019	Best Foreign Film	Parasite	Won	
St. Louis Film Critics Association Awards	15 December 2019	Best Editing	Yang Jin-mo	Nominated	
St. Louis Film Critics Association Awards	15 December 2019	Best Production Design	Lee Ha-jun	Nominated	
Sydney Film Festival Awards	16 June 2019	Sydney Film Prize	Parasite	Won	
Tallgrass Film Festival Awards	20 October 2019	Excellence in the Art of Filmmaking	Bong Joon-ho	Won	
Toronto Film Critics Association Awards	8 December 2019	Best Film	Parasite	Won	
Toronto Film Critics Association Awards	8 December 2019	Best Director	Bong Joon-ho	Won	
Toronto Film Critics Association Awards	8 December 2019	Best Screenplay	Bong Joon-ho and Han Jin-won	Runner-up (Note: Tied with Noah Baumbach for Marriage Story)	
Toronto Film Critics Association Awards	8 December 2019	Best Foreign Language Film	Parasite	Won	
Toronto International Film Festival Awards	15 September 2019	Grolsch People's Choice Award	Parasite	3rd Place	
Tromsø International Film Festival Awards	19 January 2020	Tromsø Audience Award	Parasite	Won	
Turkish Film Critics Association Awards	23 August 2020	Best Foreign Film	Parasite	Won	
Vancouver Film Critics Circle Awards	16 December 2019	Best Film	Parasite	Won	
Vancouver Film Critics Circle Awards	16 December 2019	Best Director	Bong Joon-ho	Won	
Vancouver Film Critics Circle Awards	16 December 2019	Best Foreign Language Film	Parasite	Won	
Vancouver Film Critics Circle Awards	16 December 2019	Best Screenplay	Bong Joon-ho and Han Jin-won	Nominated	
Vancouver International Film Festival Awards	11 October 2019	Super Channel People's Choice Award	Parasite	Won	
Village Voice Film Poll	14 January 2020	Best Picture	Parasite	Runner-up	
Washington D.C. Area Film Critics Association Awards	8 December 2019	Best Film	Parasite	Won	
Washington D.C. Area Film Critics Association Awards	8 December 2019	Best Director	Bong Joon-ho	Won	
Washington D.C. Area Film Critics Association Awards	8 December 2019	Best Ensemble	Parasite	Nominated	
Washington D.C. Area Film Critics Association Awards	8 December 2019	Best Original Screenplay	Bong Joon-ho and Han Jin-won	Nominated	
Washington D.C. Area Film Critics Association Awards	8 December 2019	Best Production Design	Lee Ha-jun	Nominated	
Washington D.C. Area Film Critics Association Awards	8 December 2019	Best Editing	Yang Jin-mo	Nominated	
Washington D.C. Area Film Critics Association Awards	8 December 2019	Best Foreign Language Film	Parasite	Won	
Writers Guild of America Awards	1 February 2020	Best Original Screenplay	Bong Joon-ho and Han Jin-won	Won	
