= Washington D.C. Area Film Critics Association Awards 2019 =

Annual US film awards ceremony

18th WAFCA Awards
- Date: December 8, 2019

Highlights
- Best Film: Parasite
- Best Director: Bong Joon-ho for Parasite
- Best Actor: Adam Driver
- Best Actress: Lupita Nyong'o

The 18th Washington D.C. Area Film Critics Association Awards were announced on December 8, 2019.

== Winners and nominees ==
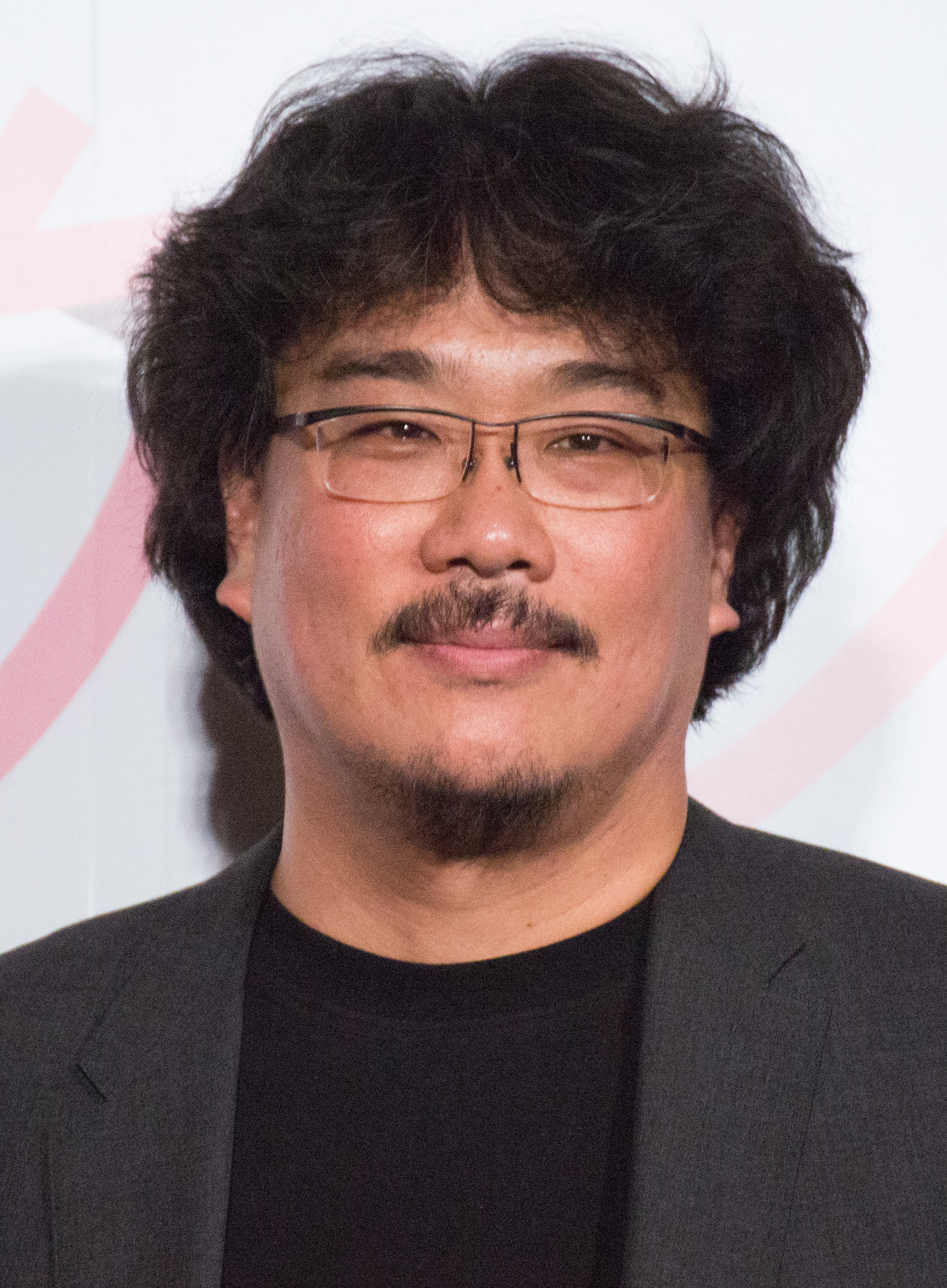
Bong Joon-ho, Best Director winner

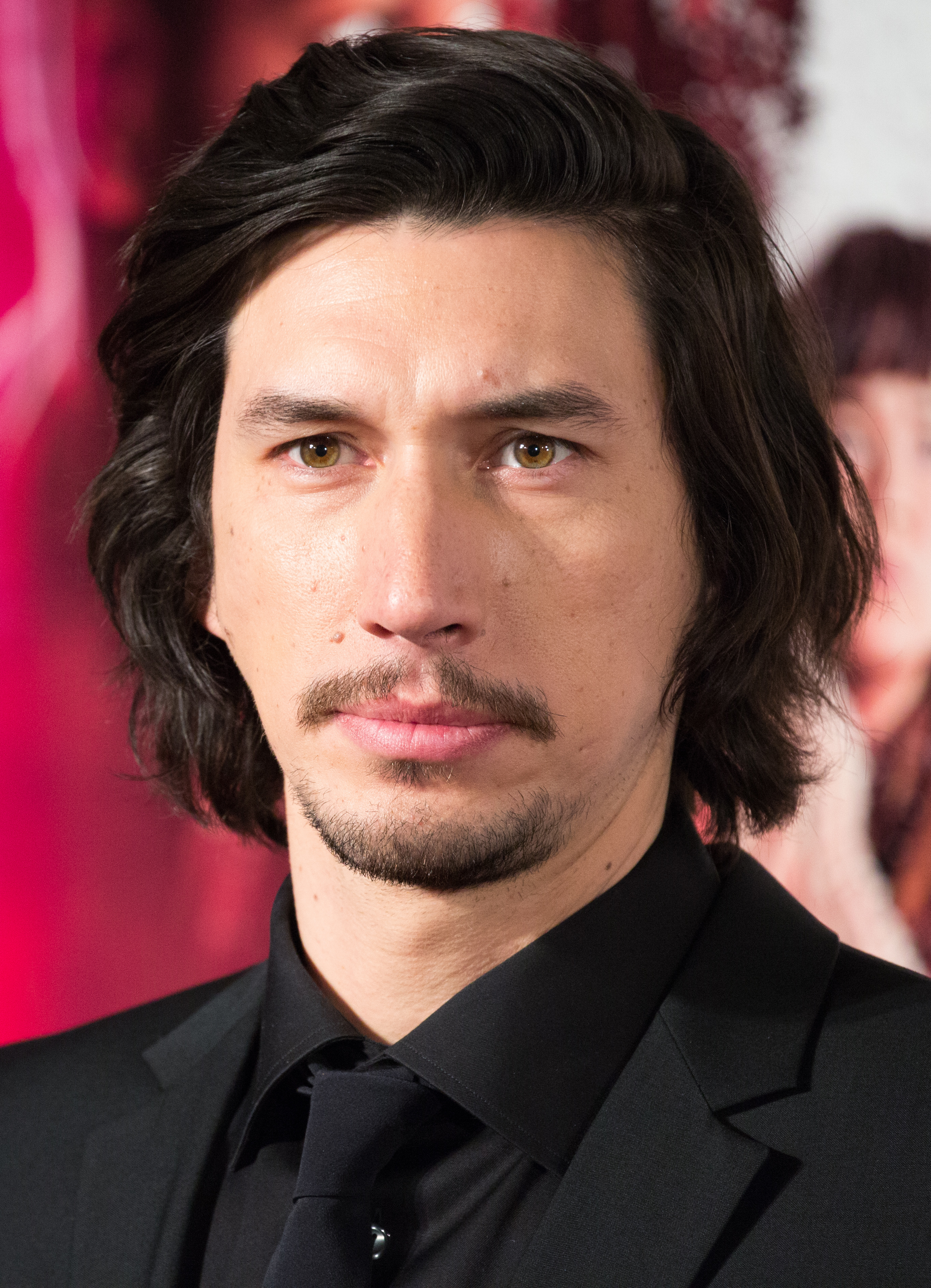
Adam Driver, Best Actor winner

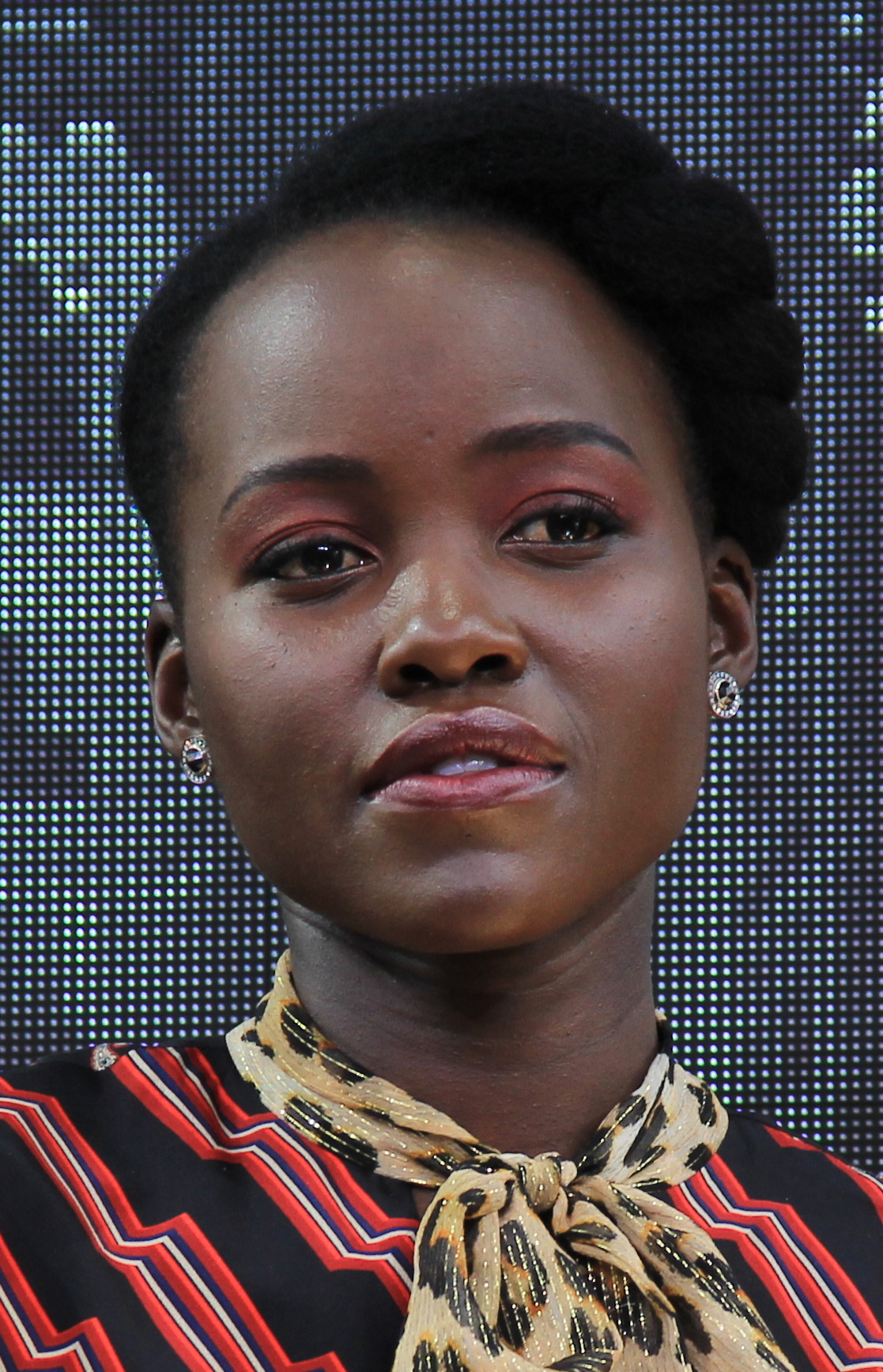
Lupita Nyong'o, Best Actress winner

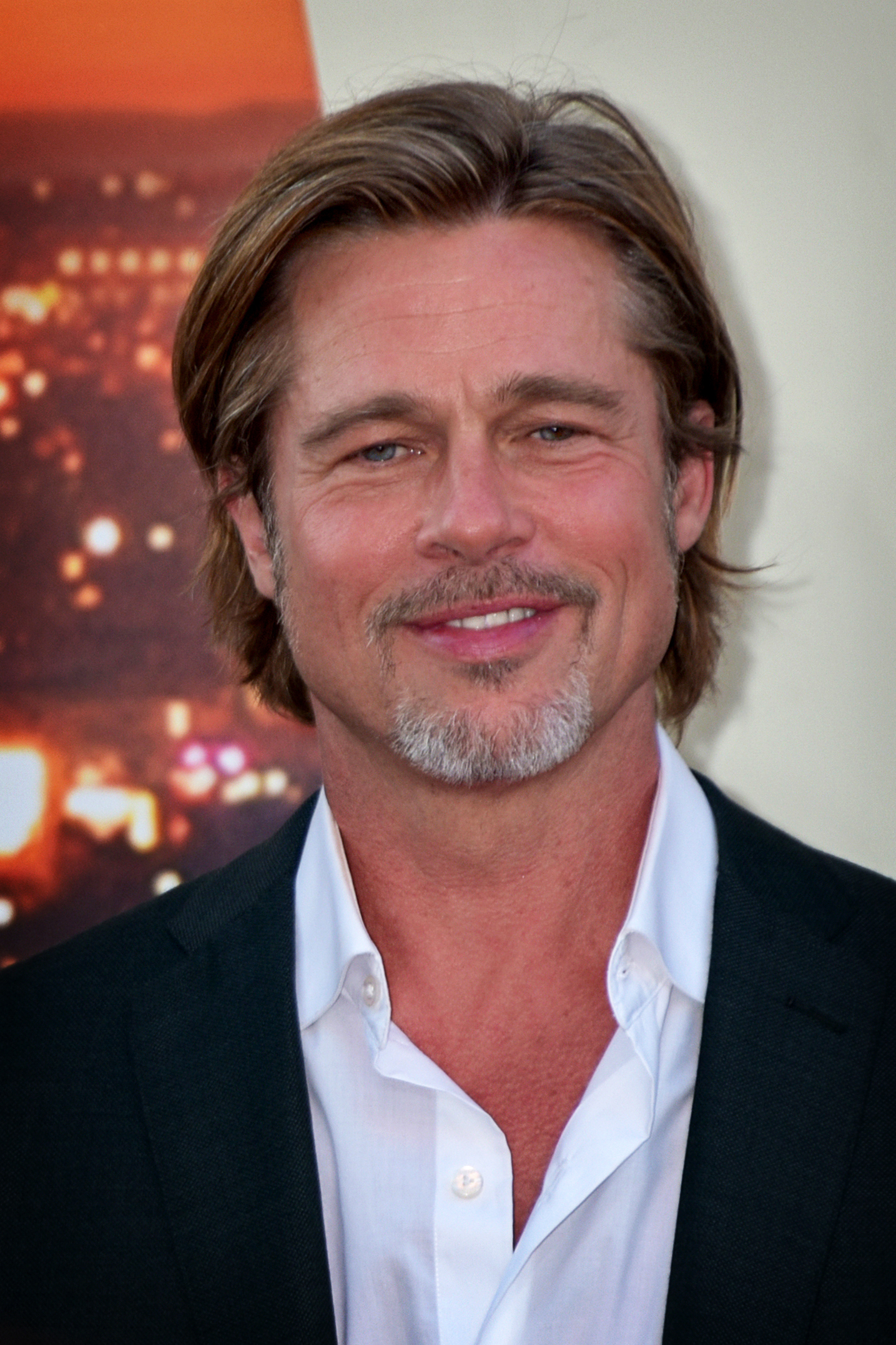
Brad Pitt, Best Supporting Actor winner

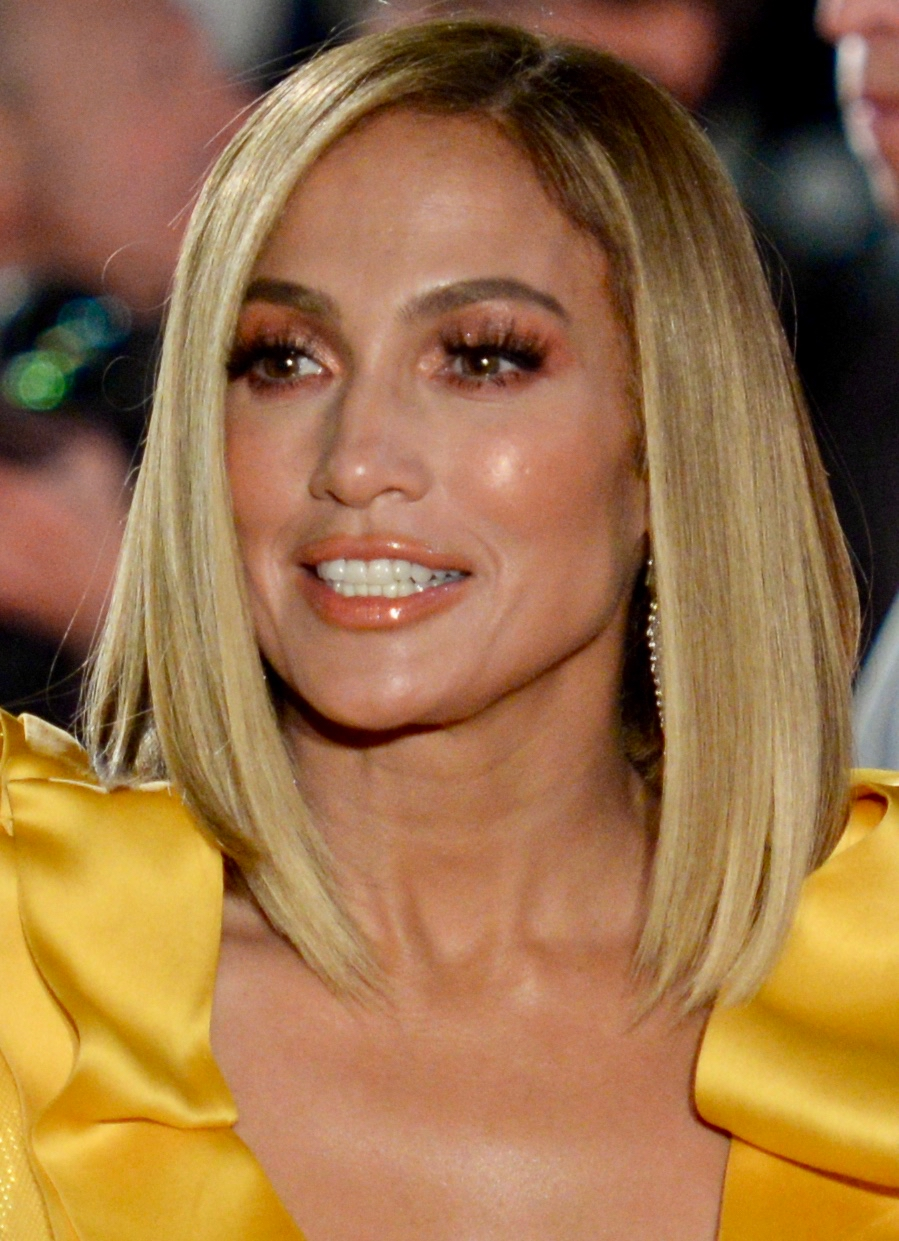
Jennifer Lopez, Best Supporting Actress winner

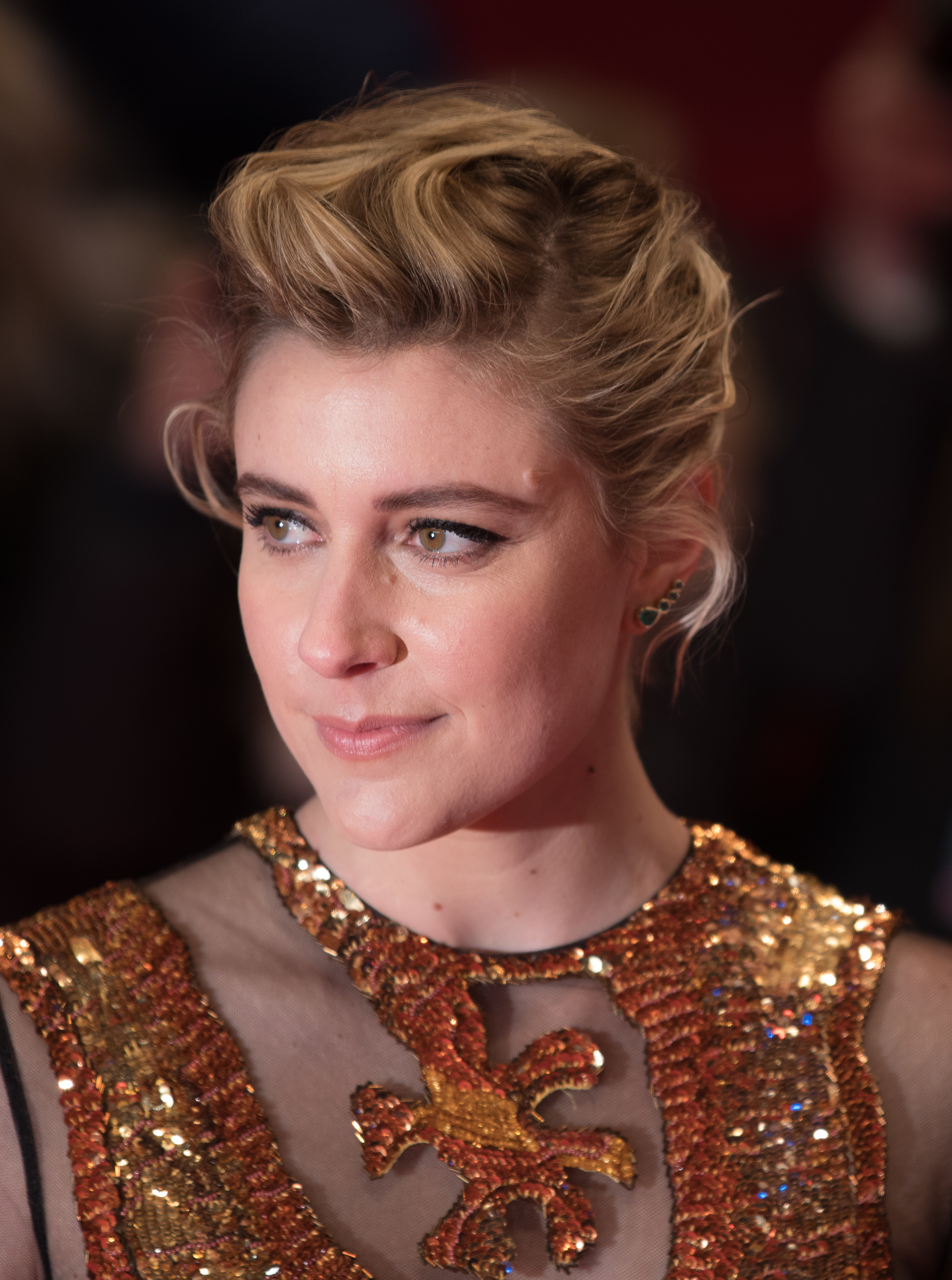
Greta Gerwig, Best Adapted Screenplay winner

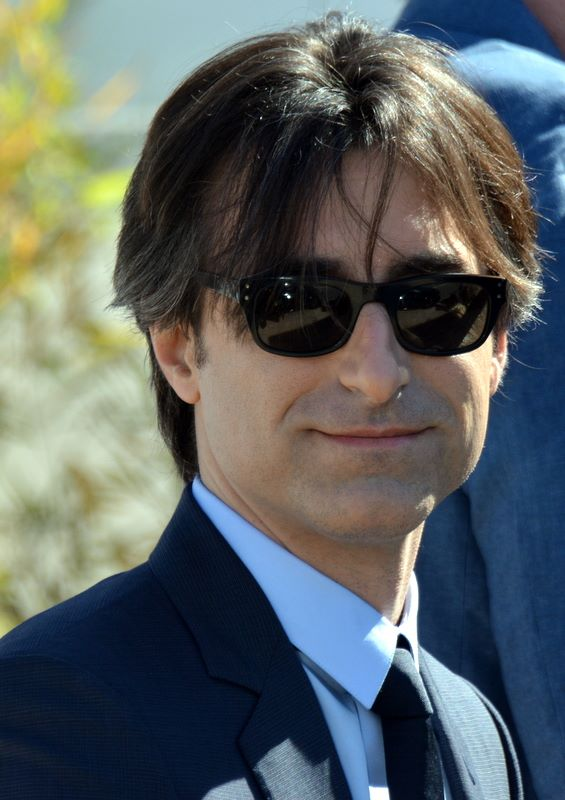
Noah Baumbach, Best Original Screenplay winner

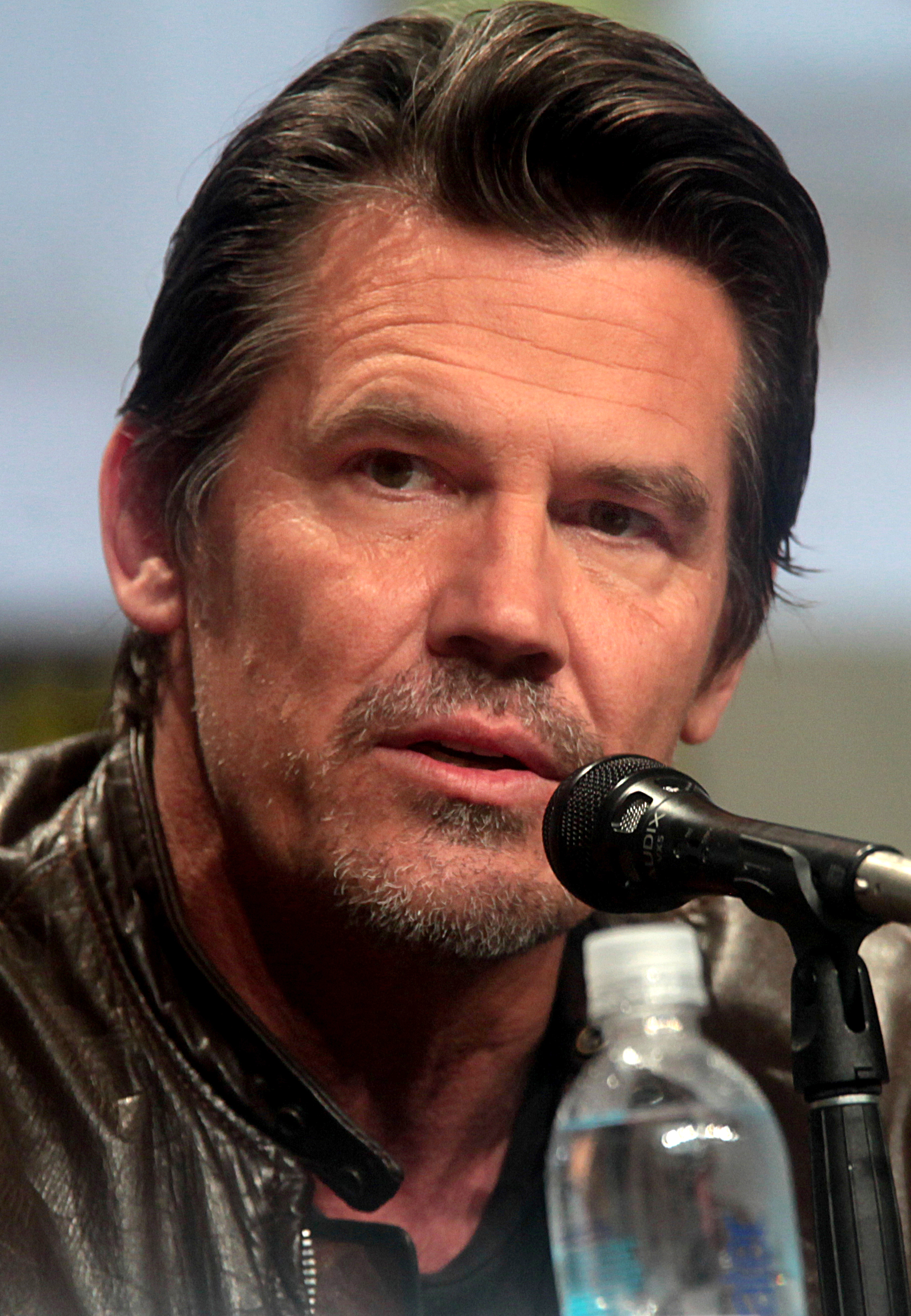
Josh Brolin, Best Motion Capture Performance winner

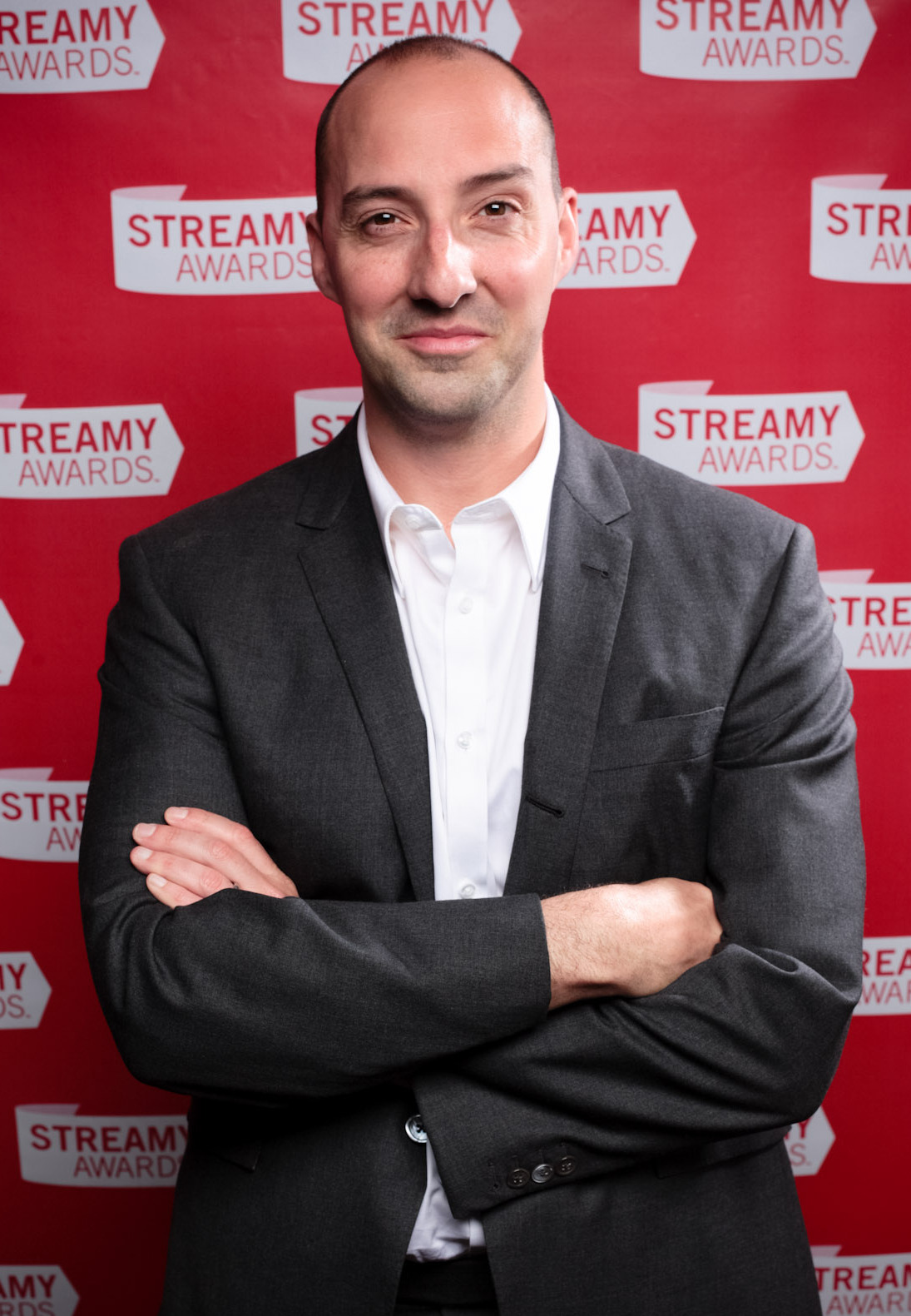
Tony Hale, Best Voice Performance winner

Best Film

- Parasite

- 1917
- The Irishman
- Marriage Story
- Once Upon a Time in Hollywood

Best Director

- Bong Joon-ho – Parasite

- Greta Gerwig – Little Women
- Sam Mendes – 1917
- Martin Scorsese – The Irishman
- Quentin Tarantino – Once Upon a Time in Hollywood

Best Actor

- Adam Driver – Marriage Story

- Robert De Niro – The Irishman
- Leonardo DiCaprio – Once Upon a Time in Hollywood
- Joaquin Phoenix – Joker
- Adam Sandler – Uncut Gems

Best Actress

- Lupita Nyong'o – Us

- Awkwafina – The Farewell
- Scarlett Johansson – Marriage Story
- Saoirse Ronan – Little Women
- Renée Zellweger – Judy

Best Supporting Actor

- Brad Pitt – Once Upon a Time in Hollywood

- Tom Hanks – A Beautiful Day in the Neighborhood
- Jonathan Majors – The Last Black Man in San Francisco
- Al Pacino – The Irishman
- Joe Pesci – The Irishman

Best Supporting Actress

- Jennifer Lopez – Hustlers

- Laura Dern – Marriage Story
- Scarlett Johansson – Jojo Rabbit
- Florence Pugh – Little Women
- Zhao Shu-zhen – The Farewell

Best Original Screenplay

- Noah Baumbach – Marriage Story

- Rian Johnson – Knives Out
- Bong Joon-ho and Han Jin-won – Parasite
- Jordan Peele – Us
- Quentin Tarantino – Once Upon a Time in Hollywood

Best Adapted Screenplay

- Greta Gerwig – Little Women (based on the novel by Louisa May Alcott)

- Micah Fitzerman-Blue and Noah Harpster – A Beautiful Day in the Neighborhood (inspired by the article "Can You Say ... Hero?" by Tom Junod)
- Todd Phillips and Scott Silver – Joker (based on characters created by Bill Finger, Bob Kane, and Jerry Robinson)
- Taika Waititi – Jojo Rabbit (based on the book Caging Skies by Christine Leunens)
- Steven Zaillian – The Irishman (based on the book I Heard You Paint Houses by Charles Brandt)

Best Animated Feature

- Toy Story 4

- Frozen 2
- How to Train Your Dragon: The Hidden World
- Klaus
- Missing Link

Best Documentary Film

- Apollo 11

- American Factory
- For Sama
- Honeyland
- One Child Nation

Best Foreign Language Film

- Parasite • South Korea

- Atlantics • Senegal
- Monos • Colombia
- Pain and Glory • Spain
- Portrait of a Lady on Fire • France

Best Cinematography

- Roger Deakins – 1917

- Jarin Blaschke – The Lighthouse
- Drew Daniels – Waves
- Rodrigo Prieto – The Irishman
- Robert Richardson – Once Upon a Time in Hollywood

Best Editing

- Andrew Buckland and Michael McCusker – Ford v Ferrari

- Yang Jin-mo – Parasite
- Fred Raskin– Once Upon a Time in Hollywood
- Thelma Schoonmaker – The Irishman
- Lee Smith – 1917

Best Original Score

- Michael Abels – Us

- Alexandre Desplat – Little Women
- Hildur Guðnadóttir – Joker
- Randy Newman – Marriage Story
- Thomas Newman – 1917

Best Production Design

- Barbara Ling (production design) and Nancy Haigh (set decoration) – Once Upon a Time in Hollywood

- Dennis Gassner (production design) and Lee Sandales (set decoration) – 1917
- Jess Gonchor (production design) and Claire Kaufman (set decoration) – Little Women
- Lee Ha-jun (production design) and Cho Won-woo (set decoration) – Parasite
- Ra Vincent (production design) and Nora Sopková (set decoration) – Jojo Rabbit

Best Acting Ensemble

- Knives Out

- The Irishman
- Little Women
- Once Upon a Time in Hollywood
- Parasite

Best Youth Performance

- Roman Griffin Davis – Jojo Rabbit

- Julia Butters – Once Upon a Time in Hollywood
- Shahadi Wright Joseph – Us
- Noah Jupe – Honey Boy
- Thomasin McKenzie – Jojo Rabbit

Best Voice Performance

- Tony Hale – Toy Story 4

- Kristen Bell – Frozen 2
- Billy Eichner – The Lion King
- Tom Hanks – Toy Story 4
- Annie Potts – Toy Story 4

Best Motion Capture Performance

- Josh Brolin – Avengers: Endgame

- Rosa Salazar – Alita: Battle Angel

The Joe Barber Award for Best Portrayal of Washington, D.C.

- The Report

- Long Shot

== Multiple nominations and wins ==
The following films received multiple nominations:

Nominations	Film
10	Once Upon a Time in Hollywood
9	The Irishman
7	Little Women
7	Parasite
6	1917
5	Jojo Rabbit
5	Marriage Story
4	Toy Story 4
4	Us
2	A Beautiful Day in the Neighborhood
2	Joker
2	Knives Out

The following films received multiple awards:

Wins	Film
3	Parasite
2	Marriage Story
2	Toy Story 4
2	Us
