= Austin Film Critics Association Awards 2019 =

Annual US film awards ceremony

15th AFCA Awards

Best Film:
Parasite

The 15th Austin Film Critics Association Awards, honoring the best in filmmaking for 2019, were announced on January 7, 2020.

== Winners and nominees ==
| Best Film | Best Director |
|---|---|
| 1. Parasite; 2. Once Upon a Time in Hollywood; 3. Uncut Gems; 4. Marriage Story; 5. The Irishman; 6. The Farewell; 7. Knives Out; 8. Jojo Rabbit; 9. 1917; 10. Portrait of a Lady on Fire | Bong Joon-ho – Parasite; Greta Gerwig – Little Women; Josh Safdie and Benny Safdie – Uncut Gems; Martin Scorsese – The Irishman; Quentin Tarantino – Once Upon a Time in Hollywood |
| Best Actor | Best Actress |
| Adam Sandler – Uncut Gems; Antonio Banderas – Pain and Glory; Leonardo DiCaprio – Once Upon a Time in Hollywood; Adam Driver – Marriage Story; Eddie Murphy – Dolemite Is My Name | Lupita Nyong'o – Us; Awkwafina – The Farewell; Scarlett Johansson – Marriage Story; Elisabeth Moss – Her Smell; Renée Zellweger – Judy |
| Best Supporting Actor | Best Supporting Actress |
| Brad Pitt – Once Upon a Time in Hollywood; Willem Dafoe – The Lighthouse; Al Pacino – The Irishman; Joe Pesci – The Irishman; Song Kang-ho – Parasite | Jennifer Lopez – Hustlers; Laura Dern – Marriage Story; Adèle Haenel – Portrait of a Lady on Fire; Scarlett Johansson – Jojo Rabbit; Florence Pugh – Little Women |
| Best Original Screenplay | Best Adapted Screenplay |
| Parasite – Bong Joon-ho and Han Jin-won; Knives Out – Rian Johnson; Marriage Story - Noah Baumbach; Once Upon a Time in Hollywood – Quentin Tarantino; Us – Jordan Peele | Little Women – Greta Gerwig; A Beautiful Day in the Neighborhood – Micah Fitzerman-Blue and Noah Harpster; Hustlers – Lorene Scafaria; The Irishman – Steven Zaillian; Jojo Rabbit – Taika Waititi |
| Best Film Editing | Best Ensemble |
| Uncut Gems - Ronald Bronstein and Benny Safdie; 1917 - Lee Smith; The Irishman - Thelma Schoonmaker; Once Upon a Time in Hollywood – Fred Raskin; Parasite – Yang Jin-mo | Knives Out; The Irishman; Little Women; Once Upon a Time in Hollywood; Parasite |
| Best Animated Film | Best Foreign Language Film |
| I Lost My Body; Frozen 2; Klaus; Missing Link; Toy Story 4 | Parasite; Atlantics; One Cut of the Dead; Pain and Glory; Portrait of a Lady on Fire |
| Best First Film | Best Documentary |
| Booksmart; Atlantics; The Last Black Man in San Francisco; The Peanut Butter Falcon; Queen & Slim | Apollo 11; The Biggest Little Farm; For Sama; Hail Satan?; One Child Nation |
| Best Cinematography | Best Score |
| 1917 – Roger Deakins; Ad Astra – Hoyte van Hoytema; The Lighthouse – Jarin Blaschke; Once Upon a Time in Hollywood – Robert Richardson; Parasite – Hong Kyung-pyo | 1917 – Thomas Newman; Little Women – Alexandre Desplat; Marriage Story – Randy Newman; Us – Michael Abels; Waves – Trent Reznor and Atticus Ross |
| Best Stunts | Best Motion Capture/Special Effects Performance |
| John Wick: Chapter 3 – Parabellum; Avengers: Endgame; Ford v Ferrari; Once Upon a Time in Hollywood; Shadow | Josh Brolin - Avengers: Endgame; Mark Ruffalo - Avengers: Endgame; Rosa Salazar - Alita: Battle Angel; Will Smith - Aladdin; Will Smith - Gemini Man |
| Bobby McCurdy Memorial Breakthrough Artist Award | Austin Film Award |
| Florence Pugh – Midsommar, Little Women and Fighting with My Family; Awkwafina – The Farewell; Noah Jupe – Honey Boy; Da'Vine Joy Randolph – Dolemite Is My Name; Lulu Wang – The Farewell | A Hidden Life – Terrence Malick; Frances Ferguson – Bob Byington; The River and the Wall – Ben Masters; Running with Beto – David Modigliani; Where'd You Go, Bernadette – Richard Linklater |
Special Honorary Award
To Agnès Varda, whose work inspired generations of filmmakers.
