= Lee Ha-jun =

South Korean production designer

- Occupation: Production designer

Lee Ha-jun is a South Korean production designer. He was nominated for an Academy Award in the category Best Production Design for the film Parasite.

== Selected filmography ==
- Twilight Gangsters (2010)
- Sea Fog (2014)
- Okja (2017)
- Parasite (2019)
