= Yang Jin-mo =

South Korean film editor

- Born: Seoul, South Korea
- Education: Film Major Bard College New York
- Occupation: film editor
- Years active: 2005-present
- Notable work: Parasite

Korean name
- Hangul: 양진모
- RR: Yang Jinmo
- MR: Yang Chinmo

Yang Jin-mo (Korean: 양진모) is a South Korean film editor. He is best known internationally for his work on multiple Academy Award winner Parasite as editor, which earned him critical appraisal and recognition including an American Cinema Editors Award for Best Edited Feature Film – Dramatic at the American Cinema Editors Awards in 2020 and the 2019 Online Film Critics Society Award for Best Editing. This made Parasite the first non-English-language film to win the top prize at the American Cinema Editors' Eddie Awards. He was also nominated for the Academy Award for Best Editing for his work on Parasite.

== Life and career ==
Yang was educated in the United States; he graduated in 1995 from Cherry Hill East High School in Cherry Hill, New Jersey and he graduated from Bard College in New York. His dream was to work for Disney. Yang speaks fluent English.

He started as an assistant editor on many productions, then proceeded to be the editor of several well-known Korean films, including Bong Joon-ho's Okja (2017), as well as films like The Tooth and the Nail (2017), the 2016 hit The Age of Shadows, the highly acclaimed 2016 zombie thriller Train to Busan, the 2016 action comedy Luck Key, and the 2015 romantic comedy The Beauty Inside. He then became the editor of Parasite (2019), which earned him critical appraisal and recognition including an American Cinema Editors Award for Best Edited Feature Film – Dramatic at the American Cinema Editors Awards in 2020. This made Parasite the first non-English-language film to win the top prize at the American Cinema Editors Awards. He was also nominated for the Academy Award for Best Editing for his work on the film.

== Filmography ==
Film making credit
| Year | Title | | Distributor |
| Year | English | Korean | Distributor |
|---|---|---|---|
| 2013 | Snowpiercer | 설국열차 | CJ Entertainment |
| 2015 | The Beauty Inside | 뷰티 인사이드 | Next Entertainment World |
| 2016 | Train to Busan | 부산행 | Next Entertainment World |
| 2016 | The Age of Shadows | 밀정 | Warner Bros. Pictures |
| 2016 | Luck Key | 럭키 | Showbox |
| 2017 | The Tooth and the Nail | 석조저택 살인사건 | CineGuru |
| 2017 | Okja | 옥자 | Netflix |
| 2017 | 1987: When the Day Comes | 1987 | CJ Entertainment |
| 2018 | Psychokinesis | 염력 | Next Entertainment World |
| 2018 | Believer | 독전 | Next Entertainment World |
| 2018 | Illang: The Wolf Brigade | 인랑 | Warner Bros. Pictures |
| 2019 | Parasite | 기생충 | CJ Entertainment |
| 2019 | The Battle: Roar to Victory | 봉오동 전투 | Showbox |
| 2020 | Peninsula | 반도 | Next Entertainment World |
| 2020 | Pawn | 담보 | CJ Entertainment |
| 2020 | The Call | 콜 | Next Entertainment World/Netflix |
| 2022 | Life Is Beautiful | 인생은 아름다워 | Lotte Entertainment |
| 2023 | Jung_E | 정이 | Netflix |
| 2023 | Cobweb | 거미집 | Barunson E&A |
| 2025 | Mickey 17 | 미키 17 | Warner Bros. Pictures |
| 2026 | Tazza: The Song of Beelzebub | 타짜: 벨제붑의 노래 | CJ Entertainment |
| 2027 | Ally | 앨리 | CJ Entertainment |

== Awards and nominations ==
| Award | Date of ceremony | Category | Recipient(s) | Result | Ref. |
|---|---|---|---|---|---|
| 36th Blue Dragon Film Awards | 2015 | Best Editing | Beauty Inside | Won | |
| Asian Film Awards | 21 March 2017 | Best Editor | Train to Busan | Nominated | |
| Blue Dragon Film Awards | 25 November 2016 | Best Editing | Train to Busan | Nominated | |
| Academy Awards | 9 February 2020 | Best Film Editing | Parasite | Nominated | |
| Alliance of Women Film Journalists | 10 January 2020 | Best Editing | Parasite | Nominated | |
| American Cinema Editors | 17 January 2020 | Best Edited Feature Film – Dramatic | Parasite | Won | |
| Asian Film Awards | 28 October 2020 | Best Editing | Parasite | Won | |
| Austin Film Critics Association | 6 January 2020 | Best Editing | Parasite | Nominated | |
| BFE Cut Above Awards | 5 March 2021 | Best Edited Single Drama | Parasite | Won | |
| Blue Dragon Film Awards | 21 November 2019 | Best Editing | Parasite | Nominated | |
| Columbus Film Critics Association Awards | 2 January 2020 | Best Film Editing | Parasite | Nominated | |
| Critics' Choice Movie Awards | 12 January 2020 | Best Editing | Parasite | Nominated | |
| Grand Bell Awards | 3 June 2020 | Best Film Editing | Parasite | Nominated | |
| Hollywood Critics Association Awards | 9 January 2020 | Best Editing | Parasite | Nominated | |
| Hollywood Professional Association | 19 November 2020 | Outstanding Editing – Theatrical Feature | Parasite | Won | |
| International Cinephile Society Awards | 5 February 2020 | Best Editing | Parasite | Runner-up | |
| Online Film Critics Society | 6 January 2020 | Best Editing | Parasite | Won | |
| San Francisco Bay Area Film Critics Circle | 16 December 2019 | Best Editing | Parasite | Nominated | |
| Saturn Awards | 26 October 2021 | Best Editing | Parasite | Nominated | |
| St. Louis Film Critics Association | 15 December 2019 | Best Editing | Parasite | Nominated | |
| Washington D.C. Area Film Critics Association | 8 December 2019 | Best Editing | Parasite | Nominated | |
