= Parasite (2019 film) =

2019 South Korean film by Bong Joon Ho

- Theatrical release poster
- Hangul: 기생충
- RR: Gisaengchung
- MR: Kisaengch'ung
- IPA: [kisʰɛŋtɕʰuŋ]
- Directed by: Bong Joon Ho
- Screenplay by: Bong Joon Ho; Han Jin-won
- Story by: Bong Joon Ho
- Produced by: Kwak Sin-ae; Moon Yang-kwon; Bong Joon Ho; Jang Young-hwan
- Starring: Song Kang-ho; Lee Sun-kyun; Cho Yeo-jeong; Choi Woo-shik; Park So-dam; Jang Hye-jin
- Cinematography: Hong Kyung-pyo
- Edited by: Yang Jin-mo
- Music by: Jung Jae-il
- Production companies: Barunson E&A
- Distributed by: CJ Entertainment
- Release dates: 21 May 2019 (Cannes); 30 May 2019 (South Korea)
- Running time: 132 minutes
- Country: South Korea
- Language: Korean
- Budget: ₩13.5 billion ($11.4 million)
- Box office: ₩377.3 billion ($258.1 million)

Parasite (Korean: 기생충) is a 2019 South Korean black comedy thriller film directed by Bong Joon Ho, who co-wrote the screenplay with Han Jin-won. It stars Song Kang-ho, Lee Sun-kyun, Cho Yeo-jeong, Choi Woo-shik, Park So-dam, Jang Hye-jin, Park Myung-hoon, and Lee Jung-eun. The film follows a poor family who infiltrates the home and life of a wealthy family.

The script is based on a play Bong wrote in 2013. He later adapted it into a 15-page film draft, which was split into three different drafts by Han. Bong said he was inspired by the Korean film The Housemaid (1960) and the 1930s Christine and Léa Papin incident. Filming ran from May to September 2018 and included cinematographer Hong Kyung-pyo, editor Yang Jin-mo, and composer Jung Jae-il. Parasite premiered on 21 May 2019 at the Cannes Film Festival, where it became the first Korean film to win the Palme d'Or. It was praised for its direction, screenplay, performances, editing, and production design. It was released in South Korea by CJ Entertainment on 30 May, grossing $258 million worldwide on an $11.4 million budget.

Among its numerous accolades, Parasite won the Academy Award for Best Picture at the 92nd Academy Awards, becoming the first non-English-language film to do so. (Note: Although Parasite was the first film with a non-English script to win Best Picture at the Oscars, it is not to be confused with the first foreign film—produced by a studio from a country that does not use English as its primary language—to win Best Picture, which was achieved by the French production The Artist (2012). However, this film was largely silent with French intertitles and contained a few spoken lines in English. The Academy dictates foreign language as the main qualification for international film, hence The Artist did not qualify. Further, while prior winners The Last Emperor (1987) and Slumdog Millionaire (2008) include significant amounts of non-English dialogue, they were considered products of the Hollywood system.) It won an additional three Oscars, for Best Director, Best Original Screenplay, and Best International Feature Film. It is the first South Korean film to receive any Academy Award recognition, and one of only four films overall to win both the Palme d'Or and the Academy Award for Best Picture, the first such achievement in over 60 years. (Note: By Parasite's 2019 release, the previous two films to win both awards were The Lost Weekend (1945) and Marty (1955). The next to attain such achievement was Anora (2024).) It won the Golden Globe Award for Best Motion Picture – Non-English Language and the BAFTA Award for Best Film Not in the English Language, and became the first non-English-language film to win the Actor Award for Outstanding Performance by a Cast in a Motion Picture.

Since its release, Parasite has been regarded as Bong's magnum opus and was ranked in the 2022 Sight and Sound poll as the 90th best film of all time. In 2025, The New York Times ranked it as the best movie of the 21st century so far in a list based on a vote by readers, actors, and directors. As of February 2025, an HBO limited television series based on the film is in early development.

== Plot ==
Kim Ki-taek and Chung-sook live in a semi-basement flat (banjiha) in Seoul with their daughter Ki-jung and son Ki-woo. As the family has financial struggles and low-income jobs, family friend Min-hyuk gives them a scholar's rock meant to promise wealth. Leaving to study abroad, he suggests that Ki-woo lie about his qualifications to take over Min-hyuk's job as an English tutor for Da-hye, the daughter of the wealthy but naïve Park family. Min-hyuk trusts Ki-woo because he likes Da-hye and wants to ask her out when he returns. After Ki-jung helps forge a certificate for him, Ki-woo, posing as a Yonsei University student named "Kevin", goes to the Parks' home, where he is hired by the mother Mrs Park by the end of his first lesson.

The Kims' scheme is to secure jobs for each family member within the Park household while concealing their true identities. Ki-woo recommends "Jessica," actually Ki-jung, as an art therapist for the Parks' young son, Da-song, who has been traumatised from having a seizure after seeing a "ghost" in their kitchen. Ki-jung then frames Yoon, the Parks' chauffeur, by making it appear as though he had a sexual encounter in the car, leading to Ki-taek being hired as his replacement. The Kims exploit the peach allergy of the Parks' longtime housekeeper, Moon-gwang, to convince Mrs Park that Moon-gwang has tuberculosis, and Chung-sook is hired as her replacement. Meanwhile, Ki-woo begins a secret romantic relationship with Da-hye.

While the Parks are away on a camping trip, the Kims revel in the luxuries of the house when Moon-gwang suddenly appears at the door, claiming to have forgotten something in the basement. She goes through a hidden entrance to an underground bunker created by the house's architect and previous owner, who had kept its existence secret from the Parks. There, Moon-gwang's husband, Geun-sae, has been hiding from loan sharks and is revealed to be the "ghost" Da-song saw. Moon-gwang begs Chung-sook to allow Geun-sae to continue living there in exchange for regular payments, but the three other Kims, who are eavesdropping, accidentally reveal their true identities. Moon-gwang films them and threatens to expose their deception to the Parks.

After the Parks call to inform the Kims that they are returning early due to a sudden severe rainstorm, the Kims quickly destroy all evidence of their ruse and subdue Moon-gwang and Geun-sae in the bunker, although Moon-gwang is injured during the struggle. The Kims manage to escape, but the torrential rain floods their flat with sewage water, forcing them to take shelter in a gymnasium alongside other displaced people.

The next day, Mrs Park organises an impromptu garden party for Da-song's birthday, with the elder Kims assisting while the younger Kims are invited as guests. Ki-woo enters the bunker with his scholar's rock, with intentions unknown. Moon-gwang is already dead from injuries sustained in the previous day's brawl; Geun-sae bludgeons Ki-woo with the rock, leaving him unconscious. Geun-sae then leaves the bunker and stabs Ki-jung with a kitchen knife in front of horrified party guests. Da-song seizes upon seeing the "ghost" again. Chung-sook impales Geun-sae with a barbecue skewer after a struggle. While Ki-taek tends to Ki-jung, Mr Park orders him to drive Da-song to the hospital. Ki-taek, gradually enraged by the Parks' lack of empathy or awareness of their own privilege, stabs him with Geun-sae's knife and flees.

Weeks later, Ki-woo is recovering from brain surgery, and he and Chung-sook have been convicted of fraud and placed on probation. Ki-jung has died from her injuries, and Ki-taek – now a wanted fugitive – has disappeared. Geun-sae is presumed to have been a random homeless man, and the motives for the murders remain unsolved. Ki-woo spies on the Parks' former home, now owned by a foreign family, and notices a Morse code message in a light visible from outside. Ki-taek, hiding in the bunker, has buried Moon-gwang in the garden and sends daily messages, hoping Ki-woo will see them. Still living in a semi-basement flat with his mother, Ki-woo writes a letter to Ki-taek, vowing to earn enough money one day to buy the house and free him.

== Cast ==
- Song Kang-ho as Kim Ki-taek (김기택), the Kim family patriarch who is hired as Park Dong-ik's chauffeur
- Lee Sun-kyun as Park Dong-ik (박동익), the Park family patriarch and breadwinner
- Cho Yeo-jeong as Choi Yeon-gyo (최연교), the Park family matriarch, introduced as a sweet but naïve stay-at-home wife
- Choi Woo-shik as Kim Ki-woo / "Kevin" (김기우), the Kims' son who is hired as Da-hye's ESOL tutor. Choi said the character is "intelligent but does not have the vigor needed to succeed in examinations".
- Park So-dam as Kim Ki-jung / "Jessica" (김기정), the Kims' daughter who is hired as Da-song's art therapist. Charismatic and cunning, she is able to assimilate into the world of the wealthy more easily than her family members.
- Jang Hye-jin as Chung-sook (박충숙), the Kim family matriarch who is hired as the Parks' housekeeper
- Lee Jung-eun as Gook Moon-gwang (국문광), the Parks' housekeeper, who also worked for the house's architect and previous owner. Bong Joon Ho said her relationship with the architect and parts of her story "that happen in between the sequences in the film" will be explored in the spin-off TV series.
- Park Myung-hoon as Oh Geun-sae (오근세), Moon-gwang's husband
- Jung Ji-so as Park Da-hye (박다혜), the Parks' reserved teenaged daughter
- Jung Hyeon-jun as Park Da-song (박다송), the Parks' eccentric young son who is seen by his parents as an artistic prodigy
- Park Keun-rok as Yoon (윤), Park Dong-ik's chauffeur
- Park Seo-joon as Min-hyuk (민혁), a family friend of the Kims
- Jung Yi-seo as a pizza parlour owner who briefly employs the Kims

== Production ==
=== Development ===
The idea for Parasite originated in 2013. While working on Snowpiercer, Bong was encouraged by a theatre actor friend to write a play. He had been a tutor for the son of a wealthy family in Seoul in his early 20s and considered turning his experience into a stage production. The film's title, Parasite, was selected by Bong as it served a double meaning, and he had to convince the film's marketing group to use it. He said: "Because the story is about the poor family infiltrating and creeping into the rich house, it seems very obvious that Parasite refers to the poor family, and I think that's why the marketing team was a little hesitant. But if you look at it the other way, you can say that rich family, they're also parasites in terms of labor. They can't even wash dishes, they can't drive themselves, so they leech off the poor family's labor. So both are parasites."

=== Writing ===
After completing Snowpiercer, Bong wrote a 15-page film treatment for the first half of Parasite, which his production assistant on Snowpiercer, Han Jin-won, turned into three different drafts of the screenplay. After finishing Okja, Bong returned to the project and finished the script. Han is credited as a co-writer.

Bong said the film was influenced by the 1960 Korean "domestic Gothic" film The Housemaid, in which a middle-class family's stability is threatened by a disruptive interloper in the form of household help. Bong further referenced the design of the wealthy protagonist's house in Kurosawa's 1963 film High and Low as an important visual influence, as was the incident of Christine and Léa Papin to the story—an event wherein two live-in maids murdered their employers in 1930s France. Bong had also tutored for a rich family himself. He said: "I got this feeling that I was infiltrating the private lives of complete strangers. Every week I would go into their house, and I thought how fun it would be if I could get all my friends to infiltrate the house one by one." Additionally, Moon-gwang's allergy to peaches was inspired by one of Bong's university friends having this allergy.

Darcy Paquet, an American residing in South Korea, translated the English subtitles, writing directly with Bong. Paquet rendered jjapaguri or chapaguri, a dish cooked by a character in the film, as ram-don, meaning ramen-udon. It is a mix of Chapagetti and Neoguri produced by Nongshim. The English version of the film shows packages labelled in English "ramyeon" and "udon" to highlight to English speakers how the name was created. Paquet believed the word ram-don did not previously exist as he found no results on Google. On one occasion, Paquet used Oxford University as a reference instead of Seoul National University, and in another, used WhatsApp as the messaging application instead of KakaoTalk. Paquet chose Oxford over Harvard because of Bong's affinity for the United Kingdom, and because Paquet believed using Harvard would be "too obvious". Paquet wrote, "In order for humor to work, people need to understand it immediately. With an unfamiliar word, the humor is lost."

=== Filming ===
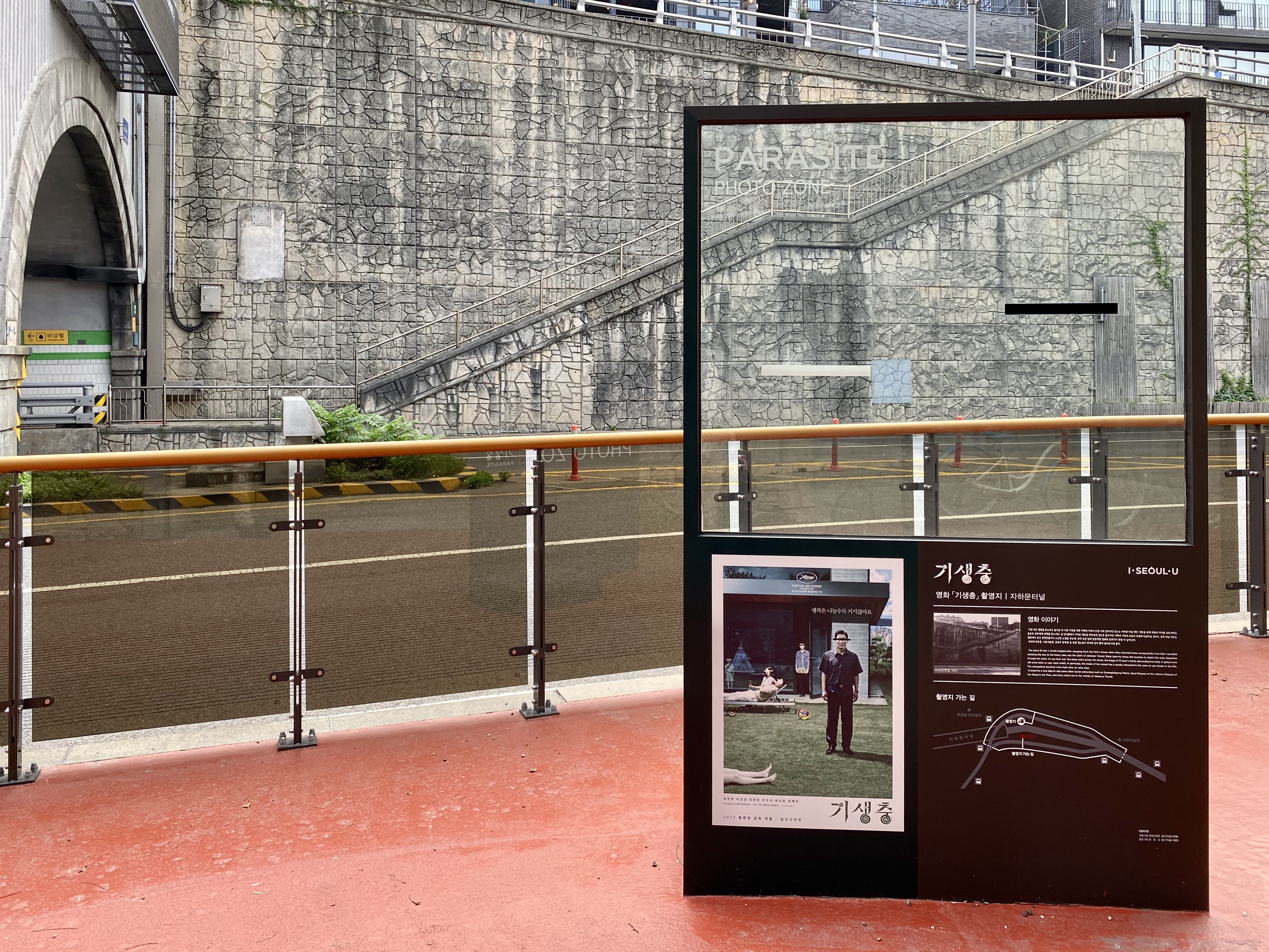
Parasite filming location at Jahamun Tunnel in Seoul

Principal photography for Parasite began on 18 May 2018 and ended on 19 September. Filming took place around Seoul and in Jeonju. The director of photography was Hong Kyung-pyo, a well-known South Korean cinematographer who had worked with other well-known directors. He shot the film with the Arri Alexa 65 and used Angénieux zoom lens.

The house was constructed on a set and everything above the first floor was added in post-production.

The Parks' house was a specially constructed set. The ground floor and the garden were constructed on an empty outdoor lot, while the basement and first floor were constructed on set. "We built the main floor of the house in a backlot and for the second floor it was all green screen outside", explained editor Yang Jin-mo. "When we shot toward the outside from inside, everything beyond the garden was all VFX." As part of the scripting, Bong also designed the home's basic layout. "It's like its own universe inside this film. Each character and each team has spaces that they take over, that they can infiltrate, and also secret spaces that they don't know." A fictional architect, Namgoong Hyeonja, was created as the home's designer and previous owner, and production designer Lee Ha-jun considered the house's form and function based on how Namgoong would design it. It was designed and constructed to be not only beautiful but "a stage that served the precise needs of his camera, compositions, and characters, while embodying his film's rich themes". Lee said,

Since Mr Park's house is built by an architect in the story, it wasn't easy finding the right approach to designing the house...I'm not an architect, and I think there's a difference in how an architect envisions a space and how a production designer does. We prioritize blocking and camera angles while architects build spaces for people to actually live in and thus design around people. So I think the approach is very different.

For example, Ha-jun established that Namgoong would have used the first floor's living room to appreciate the garden, so it was built with a single wide window and only spartan seating options for this function. Some of the interior artwork in the house sets were by South Korean artist Seung-mo Park, including existing artwork of hers and some created for the film. The team designed the home and interiors to make the set amenable for filming at the 2.35:1 aspect ratio, favouring wide and deep rooms rather than height.

Lee said the sun was an important factor when building the outdoor set. "The sun's direction was a crucial point of consideration while we were searching for outdoor lots", he said. "We had to remember the sun's position during our desired time frame and determine the positions and sizes of the windows accordingly. In terms of practical lighting, the DP [Hong Kyung-pyo] had specific requests regarding the color. He wanted sophisticated indirect lighting and the warmth from tungsten light sources. Before building the set, the DP and I visited the lot several times to check the sun's movement each time, and we decided on the set's location together".

The Kims' semi-basement flat and its street were also built on set, partially out of necessity for the flooding scenes. Lee Ha-jun visited and photographed several abandoned villages and towns in South Korea scheduled to be torn down to help inform the set design. He also created stories for the Kims' neighbours and added details of those residents along the street to improve the authenticity of the street's appearance.

=== Editing ===
According to editor Yang Jin-mo, Bong chose to shoot the film without traditional coverage. To give them more editing options with limited shots, they sometimes stitched together different takes of the same shot. Yang edited the film using Final Cut Pro 7, a program not updated since 2011.

While the film was produced for release in colour, a black and white version predated the world premiere in Cannes. The monochrome edition debuted on 26 January 2020 at the International Film Festival Rotterdam, was re-screened from 29 to 31 January, and received a limited release in some countries.

=== Music ===
The score, by South Korean composer Jung Jae-il, consisted of "minimalist piano pieces, punctuated with light percussion", setting the film's "tense atmosphere". It also had a baroque texture with excerpts from Handel's opera Rodelinda and the 1964 Italian song "In ginocchio da te" by Gianni Morandi. It was recorded mostly through computer sounds.

The soundtrack was published and released in Korea, in digital and physical formats, by Genie Music and Stone Music Entertainment on 30 May 2019. Internationally, it was released on 11 October 2019 by Milan Records. It was released in English titles, but the names and nouns are different from the English subtitles as translated by Paquet. On 14 February 2020, it was released in double-vinyl by Sacred Bones Records (a division of American film production company Neon) and Waxwork Records, in multicolour variants.

An original song, "Soju han jan" (소주 한 잔; lit. 'A glass of soju'), written by Bong and performed by Choi Woo-shik, who plays Ki-woo, is heard during the film's end credits. For marketing the soundtrack's international digital releases, the song was displayed in English as "Soju One Glass" [sic]; it was later changed to a grammatically correct title to be shortlisted for the Best Original Song category at the 92nd Academy Awards.

== Themes and interpretations ==
The main themes of Parasite are class conflict, social inequality and wealth disparity. Film critics and Bong Joon Ho himself have considered the film as a reflection of late-stage capitalism, and some have associated it with the term "Hell Joseon" (헬조선), a satirical phrase that posits that living in hell would be akin to living in modern South Korea. This term came about due to high rates of youth unemployment, the intense demands of pursuing higher education, the crisis of home affordability, and the increasing socioeconomic gap between the wealthy and poor. In Coronavirus Capitalism Goes to the Cinema, Nulman writes that the word "parasite" originally referred to a "person who eats at the table of another", which occurs in one scene of the film. Nulman also notes the connection between parasites and the Karl Marx quote:

The capitalist... is only capital personified. His soul is the soul of capital. But capital has one sole driving force, the drive to valorize itself, to create surplus-value, to make its constant part, the means of production, absorb the greatest possible amount of surplus labor. Capital is dead labor which, vampire-like, lives only by sucking living labor, and lives the more, the more labor it sucks.

The film also analyses the use of connections and qualifications to get ahead, for rich and poor families alike. Some argue that its discussion of class relates to Pierre Bourdieu's concept of habitus.

Bong has referred to Parasite as an upstairs/downstairs or "stairway movie", in which staircases are used as a motif to represent the positions of the families in the homes of the Kims and the Parks, as well as the basement bunker. The Kims' semi-basement apartment is typical for poorer Seoul residents due to its lower rent, despite having issues such as mould and increased risk of disease. Monsoon floods such as the one depicted in the film commonly damage these types of residences the most. The film presents class in spatial terms that speak to hierarchy, according to Nulman.

According to Bong, the ending implies that Ki-woo will not be able to earn the funds needed to buy the house, as the final shot shows him still in the basement flat and recalls the first scene; he described this shot as a "surefire kill" (확인사살), referring to a coup de grace to ensure death. The ending song refers to Ki-woo working to make money to get the house. Choi Woo-shik estimated that it would take approximately 564 years for Ki-woo to earn enough money to purchase the house. Nevertheless, he was optimistic: "I'm pretty sure Ki-woo is one of those bright kids. He'll come up with some idea, and he would just go into the German family's house, and I think he will rescue his father". But on many interpretations, this dream subscribes to a bootstrapping mentality and is unlikely to be achieved; furthermore, "it does not address the fundamental problem at hand. Even in this fantasy scenario, Ki-taek would still be contained in the house by a legal system that would seek his prosecution and imprisonment. The forces that created and upheld the Kim family's separation would not be undone, merely adapted to".

Park Da-song is obsessed with "Indians" and owns Native American-themed toys and inauthentic replicas. Nulman makes the link between the "native" Park family and the invaders: the Kims, who bring with them deadly parasites to which the natives have no immunity. Nulman points to the miasma theory of scent carrying disease: it was thought that natives could catch diseases just by smelling the noxious air carried by colonising Spaniards. This connects to the film's theme around the class distinction of smell. Bong has noted: "I wouldn't go so far as to say it's a commentary on what happened in the United States, but it's related in the sense that this family starts infiltrating the house and they already find a family living there. So you could say it's a joke in that context. But at the same time, the Native Americans have a very complicated and long, deep history. But in this family, that story is reduced to a young boy's hobby and decoration. The boy's mother mentions the tent as a US imported good, and I think it's like the Che Guevara T-shirts that people wear. They don't know the life of the revolutionary figure, they just think it's a cool T-shirt. That's what happens in our current time: the context and meaning behind these actual things only exists as a surface-level thing".

Some critics note the importance of working-class solidarity as presented in the film. The Kims' problems are a result of lack of class solidarity with the other poor family, Geun-sae and Moon-gwang. At the film's climax, Ki-taek becomes aware of his class identity when Mr Park is disgusted by Geun-sae's smell. Others said Parasite revealed the misfortunes of poor, powerless victims of an indifferent world who are transformed into liberation through the comical effect of mass slaughter.

== Release ==
=== Theatrical ===
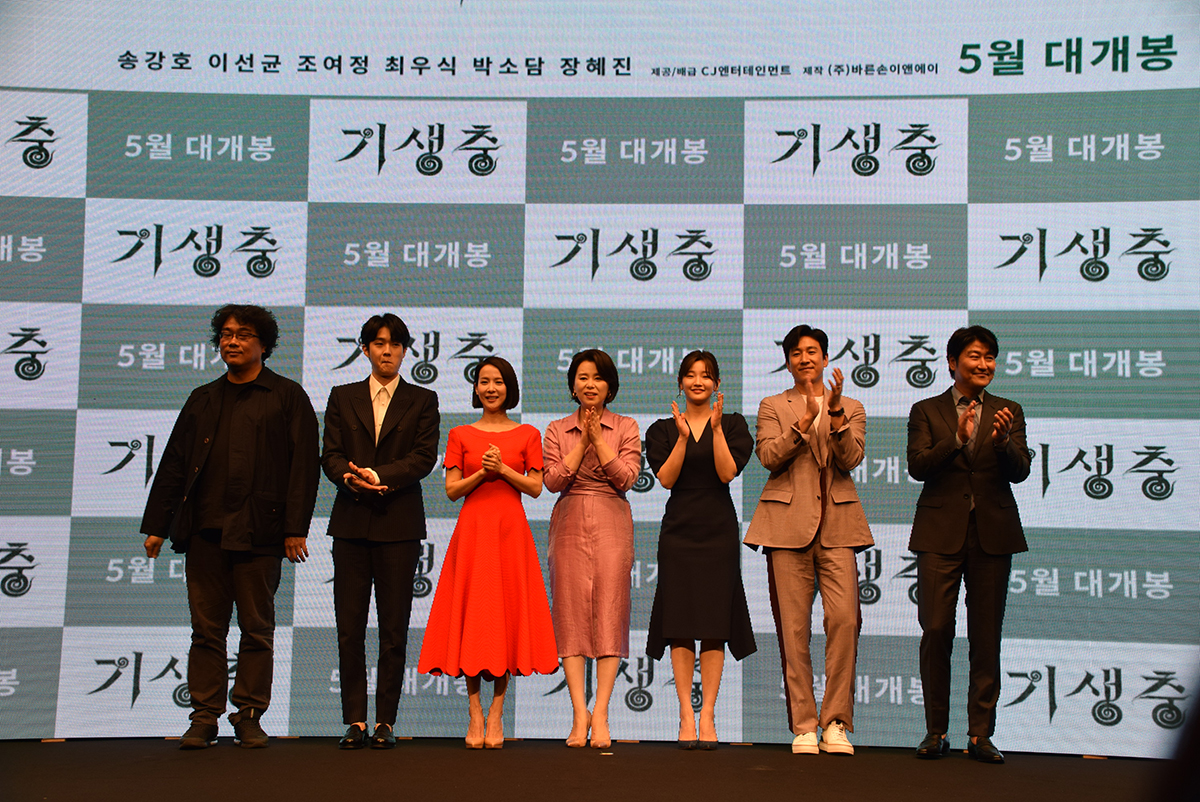
Director and stars at an April 2019 press event

Neon acquired the US and Canadian rights to the film at the 2018 American Film Market. Darcy Paquet, an American film critic and author, provided English translations for the film's international release. The film's rights were also pre-sold to German-speaking territories (Koch Films), French-speaking territories (The Jokers) and Japan (Bitters End). The film had its world premiere at the 2019 Cannes Film Festival on 21 May. It was released in South Korea on 30 May 2019.

It was released in Australia and New Zealand by Madman Films on 27 June 2019 (becoming both the highest-ever-grossing Korean film in the region and the distributor's highest-ever-grossing non-English-language film in Australia). It screened at the Toronto International Film Festival in Toronto, Canada, in September 2019 and was released generally in the US and Canada on 11 October 2019. It was released in South Africa by Brandchina on 11 October 2019. The film was originally scheduled to be screened as a closing film at FIRST International Film Festival Xining in China on 28 July 2019, but on 27 July, the film festival organisers announced that the screening was cancelled for "technical reasons".

It was licensed for the United Kingdom and Ireland by Curzon Artificial Eye at Cannes, and had preview screenings in cinemas nationwide with an interview with Bong shared live by satellite on 3 February 2020, followed by the film's general release on 7 February.

Neon expanded the number of North American cinemas showing the film from 1,060 to 2,001 starting on the weekend of 14 February 2020, following the film's recognition at the Academy Awards, despite the film having already been released on home video in the region. A special IMAX remaster was shown at limited North American cinemas during the week of 21 February 2020. The same remaster was re-released in IMAX cinemas on 7 February 2025 to celebrate the film's five-year anniversary.

=== Home media ===
By December 2019, the film had earned a net revenue of $90 million from home entertainment, television and international sales. On 28 January 2020, Parasite was released on Blu-ray and DVD by Neon, with distribution by Universal Pictures Home Entertainment, and on 2 June it was released on Ultra HD Blu-ray. The Criterion Collection released a remastered version, alongside the black-and-white version, in October 2020.

On 24 February 2020, the subscription-based streaming service Hulu announced that it had secured exclusive rights to stream the film in the US, starting on 8 April 2020. Amazon Prime Video began streaming the film outside the US on 28 March 2020. The film came to Netflix in the US and UK on 1 February 2025. In the UK, it was 2020's best-selling foreign language film on physical home video formats.

=== Black and white edition ===
Parasite: Black-and-White Edition, a special monochrome version of the film, had its world premiere at the International Film Festival Rotterdam in January 2020 followed by a limited release in some US cities.

The black and white edition was released on 24 July 2020 in the UK and Ireland by Curzon Artificial Eye in cinemas and on-demand simultaneously, then released on DVD and Blu-ray in the US and Canada as part of The Criterion Collection special edition on 27 October 2020. The black and white transfer of the film was overseen by Bong and cinematographer Hong Kyung-pyo.

== Reception ==
=== Box office ===
Parasite grossed $71.4 million in South Korea and $53.7 million in the US and Canada, part of a worldwide total of $258.1 million. It set a new record for Bong, becoming the first of his films to gross over $100 million worldwide. Deadline Hollywood calculated the net profit as $46.2 million.

In South Korea, Parasite grossed $20.7 million on its opening weekend. It closed its box-office run with $72.2 million and more than ten million admissions, equal to roughly one-fifth of the country's population and ranking first among the year's top five films.

In the film's US opening weekend, it grossed $376,264 from three cinemas. Its per-venue average of $125,421 was the best since La La Land's in 2016, and the best ever for an international film. It expanded to 33 cinemas in its second weekend, making $1.24 million, and then made $1.8 million from 129 cinemas in its third. The film made $2.5 million in its fourth weekend and $2.6 million in its fifth. Its initial showings count peaked in its sixth weekend at 620, when it made $1.9 million. It continued to hold well over the following weekends, making $1.3 million and then $1 million.

In its tenth week of release the film crossed the $20 million mark (rare for an international film), making $632,500 from 306 cinemas. During the weekend of the Oscars, the film made $1.5 million from 1,060 cinemas for a running total of $35.5 million. After Neon's doubling of showings in the week after the Academy Awards, the film made $5.5 million in revenue from the US and Canada, one of the largest Best Picture bumps since Slumdog Millionaire in 2009 and the largest in ten years.

On 5 February, Parasite became the first Korean film in nearly 15 years to surpass one million filmgoers in Japan. In the UK, it broke the record for the opening weekend of a non-English-language film, making £1.4 million ($1.8 million) including previews over its debut weekend, from 135 screens, and in Australia it took in over $1.9 million. In the weekend after its Oscars wins, it made $12.8 million from 43 countries, bringing its international total to $161 million and its global running gross to over the $200 million mark.

Following its Academy Awards success, Parasite received significant rescreening, generating significant further revenue. The Associated Press reported the biggest "Oscar effect" since 2001 after Gladiator won Best Picture. Parasite's box office revenue increased by more than 230% compared to the prior week, grossing $2.15 million in a single day. It also ranked No. 1 in Japan, the first Korean film to do so in 15 years. The Motion Picture Distributors Association of Australia announced that $749K worth of cinema tickets were sold in a single weekend, with the film reentering the top ten at the local box office more than six months after it debuted in Australian cinemas. Parasite also surged back to fourth place in South Korea's box office by attracting more than 80,000 viewers.

=== Critical response ===
On review aggregator Rotten Tomatoes, Parasite has an approval rating of 99% based on 485 reviews, with an average rating of 9.40/10. The website's critics consensus reads: "An urgent, brilliantly layered look at timely social themes, Parasite finds writer-director Bong Joon Ho in near-total command of his craft." The site ranked it fifth on their "300 Best Movies of All Time" list in 2025. On Metacritic, 56 compiled reviews from critics were identified as positive, giving the film a weighted average score of 97 out of 100. On the same site, Parasite was rated the best film of 2019 and ranked seventh among the films with the highest scores of the decade. As of 20 November 2021, it is the forty-ninth-highest-rated film of all time on the website.

Writing for The New York Times, A. O. Scott called the film "wildly entertaining", and added that it was the kind of energised film that "obliterates the tired distinctions between art films and popcorn movies". Bilge Ebiri of Vulture magazine wrote that Parasite is "a work that is itself in a state of constant, agitated transformation—a nerve-racking masterpiece whose spell lingers long after its haunting final image". In his five-star review, Dave Calhoun of Time Out praised the film's social commentary, calling the work "surprising and fully gripping from beginning to end, full of big bangs and small wonders". Variety's Jessica Kiang called the film "a wild, wild ride", writing that "Bong is back and on brilliant form, but he is unmistakably, roaringly furious, and it registers because the target is so deserving, so enormous, so 2019: Parasite is a tick fat with the bitter blood of class rage". Joshua Rivera of GQ gave a glowing review and declared that Parasite was possibly one of the best films of 2019.

Michael Wood writing for the London Review of Books found its following a theme of class consciousness to be consistent with Snowpiercer: "The theme of social ascent, or social difference as a landscape, could hardly be more obvious, but we are beginning to get the movie's idea: not to avoid stereotypes but to keep crashing into them". UK film website TheShiznit awarded it an A, noting that "it makes you wonder what the inflection point for such behaviour is in a culture where manners and servitude are drilled into those who can't afford not to have them". The A.V. Club's A. A. Dowd awarded the film an A−, praising the fun and surprising twists.

Parasite ranked first in a survey by IndieWire of over 300 critics, in the Best Film, Best Director, Best Screenplay and Best Foreign Film categories. It also appeared on over 240 critics' year-end top-ten lists, including 77 who ranked it first.

In 2021, members of Writers Guild of America West (WGAW) and Writers Guild of America, East (WGAE) ranked its screenplay 4th in WGA’s 101 Greatest Screenplays of the 21st Century (so far). In June 2025, in a poll of New York Times readers, 500 directors, actors, and critics, The New York Times ranked Parasite as the best movie of the 21st century.

In July 2025, it ranked number four on Rolling Stone's list of "The 100 Best Movies of the 21st Century."

== Accolades ==
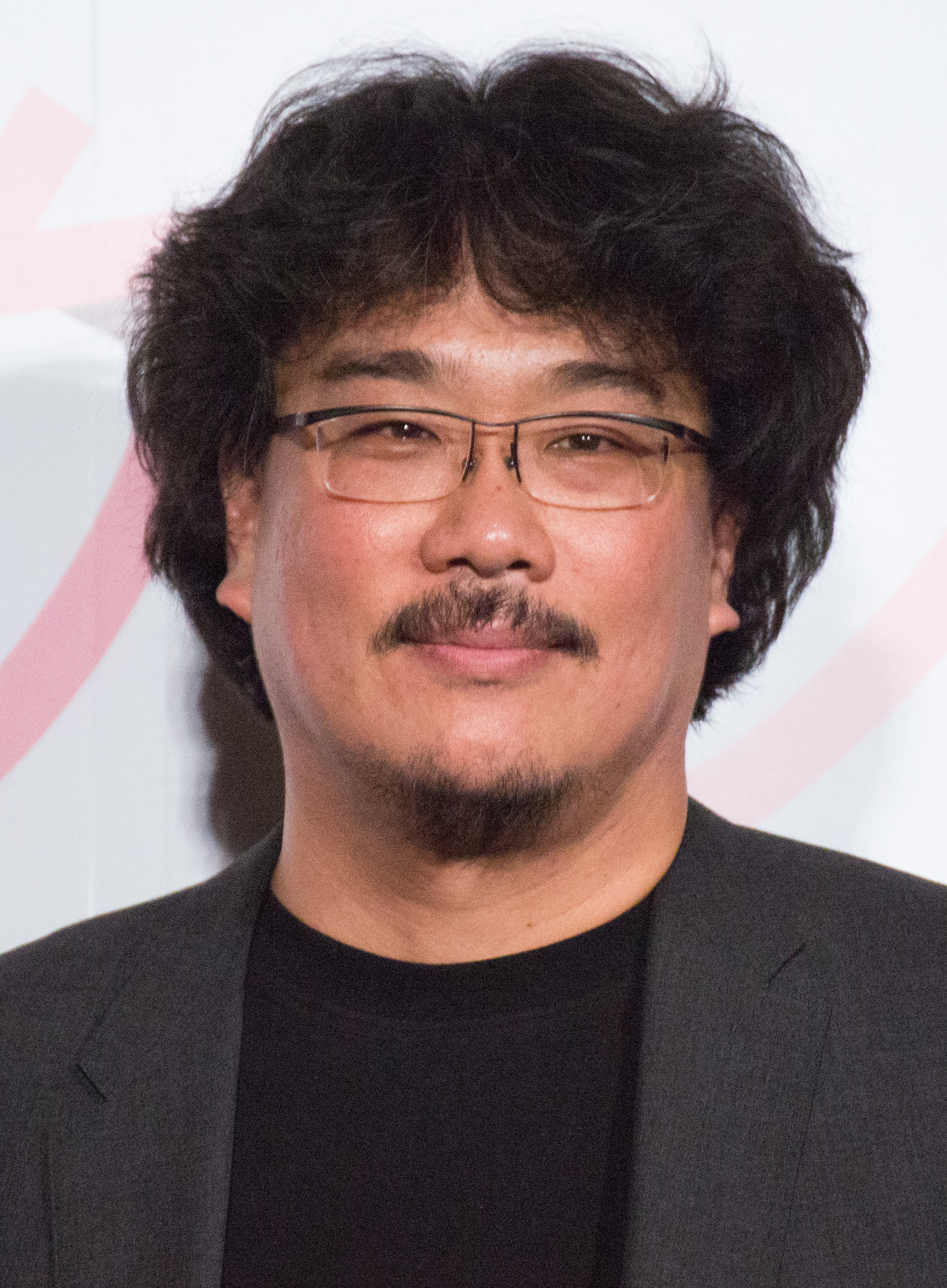
Bong Joon Ho was awarded the Academy Award for Best Director in 2020.

Parasite won the Palme d'Or at the 2019 Cannes Film Festival. It became the first South Korean film to do so, as well as the first film to win with a unanimous vote since Blue Is the Warmest Colour at the 2013 Cannes Film Festival. At the 77th Golden Globe Awards, the film was nominated for three awards, including Best Director and Best Screenplay, and won Best Foreign Language Film, becoming the first South Korean film to achieve that feat.

It became the second international film to ever be nominated for the Screen Actors Guild Award for Outstanding Performance by a Cast in a Motion Picture since Life Is Beautiful (1997), and ultimately won the category, making it the first international film to win the prize. Parasite was also nominated for four awards at the 73rd British Academy Film Awards—Best Film, Best Director, Best Original Screenplay, and Best Film Not in the English Language, being the first South Korean film to receive nominations other than for Best Film Not in the English Language, and went on to win Best Original Screenplay and Best Film Not in the English Language.

Parasite was submitted as the South Korean entry for Best International Feature Film for the 92nd Academy Awards, making the December shortlist. It went on to win four awards—Best Picture, Best Director, Best Original Screenplay, and Best International Feature Film. Parasite became the first non-English language film in Academy Awards history to win Best Picture. Parasite also became the first South Korean film to be nominated for Best Picture at the Academy Awards and the second East Asian film to receive a nomination for Best Picture since Crouching Tiger, Hidden Dragon (2000), and Bong Joon Ho became the fourth Asian to receive an Academy Award nomination for Best Director, becoming the second to win, after Ang Lee. It also received nominations for Best Film Editing and Best Production Design. The film is also the second film to win both the Academy Award for Best Picture and the Palme d'Or at Cannes under the latter's name in 65 years since Marty, being the third film to win both grand prizes after the former and The Lost Weekend.

At the 56th Grand Bell Awards, Parasite earned a leading eleven nominations, with five wins (the most for the show): Best Film, Best Director (for Bong), Best Supporting Actress (for Lee Jung-eun), Best Screenplay (for Bong and Han Jin-Won), and Best Music (for Jung Jae-il).

When I was young and studying cinema, there was a saying that I carved deep into my heart, which is that, "The most personal is the most creative."

— Bong Joon Ho in an acceptance speech for winning Best Director at the 92nd Academy Awards, as he attributed to Martin Scorsese.

During Bong's acceptance speech at the Oscars, he paused to thank Martin Scorsese, a co-nominated director, whom Bong recognised as having historical importance to the history of filmmaking, which resulted in spontaneous applause from the audience. The next day, Scorsese sent Bong a congratulatory letter, which Bong reported while on a speaking engagement at the Film at Lincoln Center event, though Bong said he could not share the full letter due to its personal nature. He did, however, share the conclusion of the letter, saying that Scorsese told him: "You've done well. Now rest. But don't rest for too long." Bong then added that Scorsese ended his letter by saying "how he and other directors were waiting for my next movie".

The Associated Press commented that although the Academy of Motion Picture Arts and Sciences (AMPAS) had previously failed to adequately recognise women filmmakers in the Academy Award nominations, this time it acknowledged diversity. The Wall Street Journal also wrote that the film seemed to promise a "more inclusive Oscars" demanded by those who have previously criticised AMPAS. The AP noted that the film's victory, as an Oscar-winning foreign film in a regular Academy category, opened the door for Hollywood to undergo a radical change and a different kind of advancement, as a skeptic worried that if "Parasite won the Oscar for best international film, it probably wouldn't win any other major awards". "The Academy gave Best Picture to the actual best picture", wrote Justin Chang of the Los Angeles Times, adding that the film awards body was "startled ... into recognizing that no country's cinema has a monopoly on greatness". In 2021, the Writers Guild of America ranked Parasite's screenplay the fourth-greatest of the 21st century so far. In the decennial critics' poll published by the British Film Institute's magazine Sight and Sound in 2022, Parasite was tied for the 90th greatest film of all time.

On 28 March 2023, Cannes Film Festival president Thierry Frémaux revealed that after Everything Everywhere All at Once, a 2022 science fiction comedy-drama also featuring a predominantly Asian cast, won the Best Picture Oscar at the 95th Academy Awards, he began to question whether the Best Picture win for Parasite was worthy enough, saying: "How can a non-American film win the Oscar for best film since it's a ceremony in honor of American cinema? Parasite won, it's great, but it's a Korean film."

== In other media ==
=== Spin-off television series ===
A six-hour HBO limited series based on the film, with Bong and Adam McKay as executive producers, was announced to be in early development in January 2020. Bong has said that this will also be titled Parasite, and will explore stories "that happen in between the sequences in the film". In February 2020, Mark Ruffalo was rumoured to star and Tilda Swinton was confirmed as being cast in a lead role. But, in October 2022, Swinton announced she was no longer involved with the series. Bong confirmed in February 2025 that the series was still in development.

=== Plans for tourist set ===
A South Korean local authority (Goyang) plans to restore the Goyang Aqua Special Shooting Studio set, where Parasite was produced, and use it as a Parasite film experience tourism facility. In addition, Goyang has announced that it will invest $150 million in the development of the Goyang Film Culture Complex by 2026 to accommodate film experience tourism facilities, additional indoor studios, outdoor set production facilities, inter-Korean video content centres, image research, and development companies. Criticism has been made about the commercialisation of areas known for poverty in South Korea as tourist destinations without concrete steps being taken to address the issues.

=== City tourism and food ===
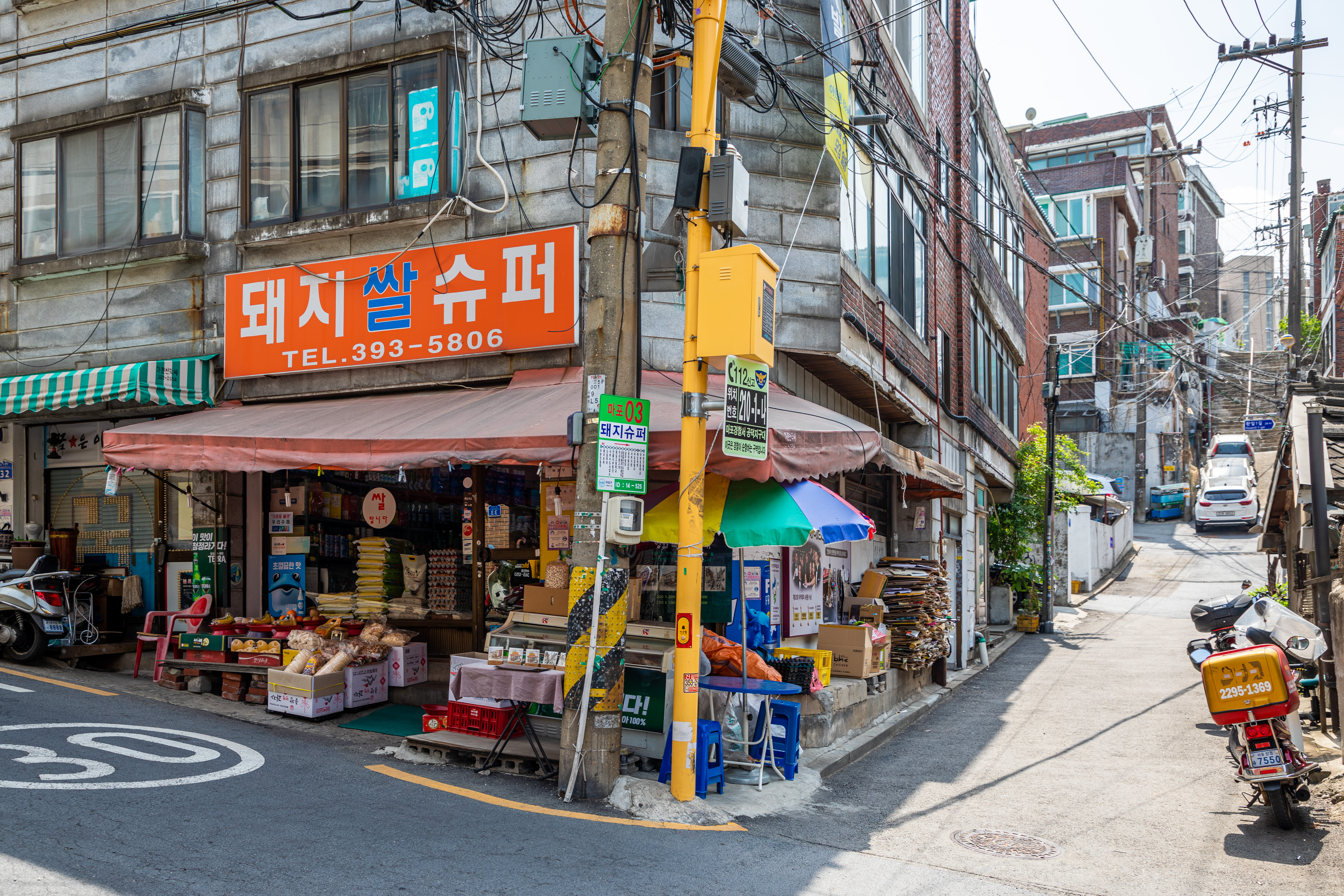
Doijissal Supermarket, a convenience store used as a filming spot. In the film, it was labelled 'Woori Supermarket'.

The Seoul Tourism Organization (STO) has been criticised by South Korea's opposition party and residents of Seoul for introducing a tour route featuring filming locations and stories from the film. The Justice Party claims that it became famous due to the universal recognition of global inequality, but sees the development of a tourist attraction based on the film in Seoul as further exploitation of poverty. Residents of Parasite's filming locations have reportedly complained of a sense of embarrassment and discomfort due to an increase in tourists visiting their neighbourhoods and taking photos of their surroundings, making them feel like "monkeys in a zoo". In response, the local government of Seoul has announced that government funding will prioritise the estimated 1,500 low-income families living in the semi-basement type accommodations featured in the film.

People began posting videos on how to make jjapaguri on YouTube after the film was distributed. Nongshim, the manufacturer of Chapagetti and Neoguri, also began distributing a singular "Chapaguri" product due to the combination's popularity from the film.

== Bibliography ==
- Botz-Bornstein, Thorsten; Stamatellos, Giannis (2022). Parasite: A Philosophical Exploration. Brill. ISBN 978-90-04-51562-8.

== See also ==
- List of South Korean submissions for the Academy Award for Best International Feature Film
- List of submissions to the 92nd Academy Awards for Best International Feature Film
