= Han Jin-won =

South Korean screenwriter

Han Jin-won (Korean: 한진원; born 1985) is a South Korean screenwriter. He is best known for his work on Parasite as writer, which earned him critical appraisal and recognition including an Academy Award for Best Original Screenplay at the 92nd Academy Awards in 2020. He shared this award with Bong Joon-ho, and this made the two of them the first Asian writers to win any screenwriting Academy Award.

== Filmography ==
Year	Title	Director(s)	Screenwriter(s)	Actor(s)	Notes
2012	South Bound	No	No	No	Prop team
2014	Dad for Rent	Assistant	No	No	
2014	Daughter	Assistant	No	No	
2015	Granny's Got Talent	Assistant	No	Yes	Role as Bus mock 3
2015	Enemies In-Law	Support for Directing	No	No	
2016	Pandora	Assistant	No	No	
2017	Sense8 season 2	Assistant	No	No	Third assistant director – Korea Unit
2017	Okja	Assistant	No	No	
2019	Parasite	No	Yes	No	Co-writer with Bong Joon-ho; Also credited as script supervisor Academy Award for Best Original Screenplay; BAFTA Award for Best Original Screenplay
2025	Newtopia	No	Yes	No	TV series
2025	I Am a Running Mate	Yes	Yes	No	TV series
