= List of accolades received by Jojo Rabbit =

Jojo Rabbit accolades
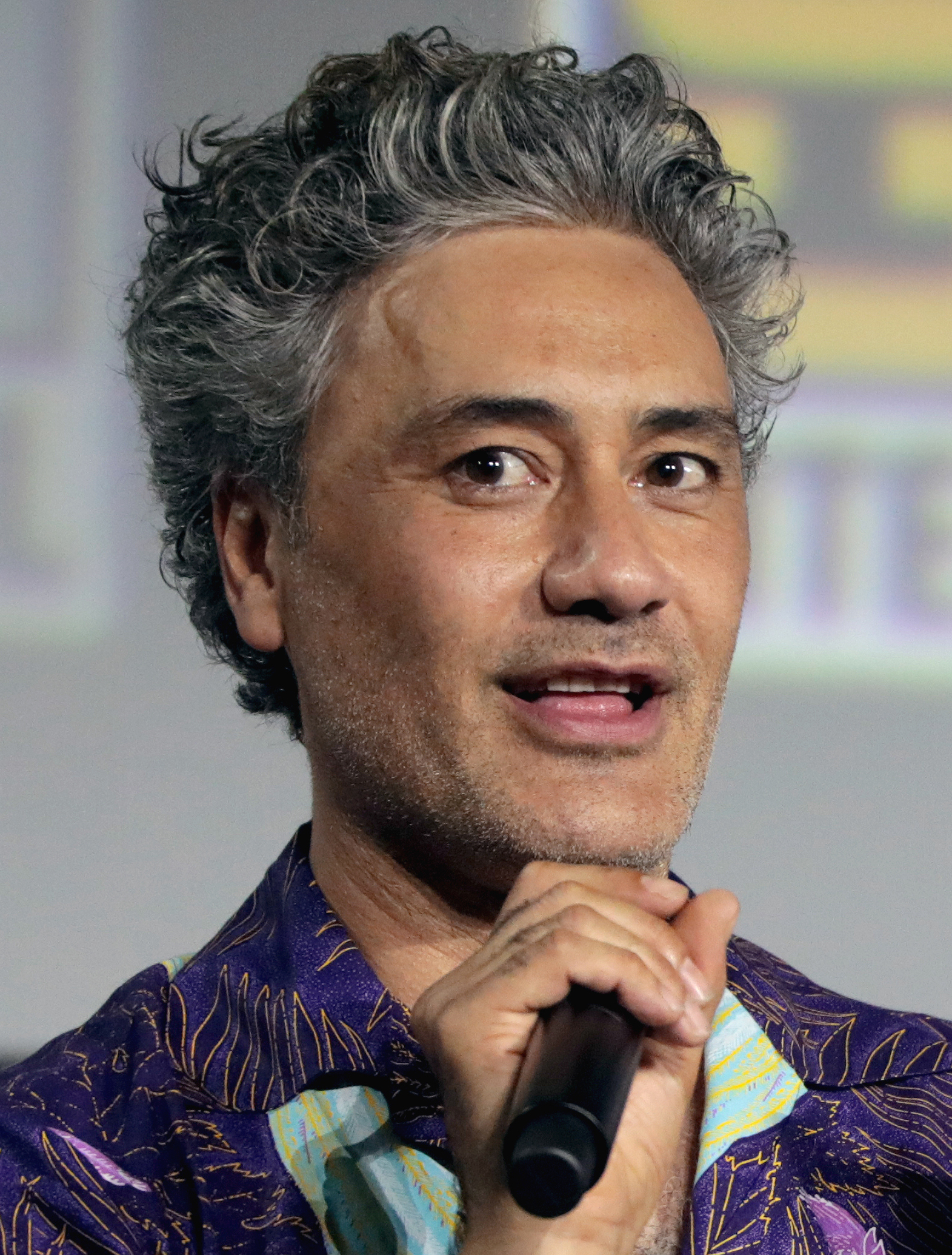
- Taika Waititi, who wrote, directed and acted in the film, received several accolades for his screenplay.
Awards and nominations
Award	Wins	Nominations
AACTA International Awards	1	1
Academy Awards	1	6
Alliance of Women Film Journalists EDA Awards	0	2
American Cinema Editors Eddie Awards	1	1
American Film Institute Awards	1	1
Art Directors Guild Awards	0	1
Artios Awards	1	1
Austin Film Critics Association Awards	1	3
Bodil Awards	0	1
British Academy Film Awards	1	6
Chicago Film Critics Association Awards	0	2
Chlotrudis Awards	0	1
Cinema for Peace Awards	0	1
Cork International Film Festival Awards	0	1
Costume Designers Guild Awards	1	1
Critics' Choice Movie Awards	1	7
Dallas–Fort Worth Film Critics Association Awards	1	1
Detroit Film Critics Society Awards	0	3
Directors Guild of America Awards	0	1
Fantastic Fest Awards	1	1
Florida Film Critics Circle Awards	0	3
Georgia Film Critics Association Awards	0	1
Golden Globe Awards	0	2
Golden Panda Awards	2	4
Golden Reel Awards	1	2
Golden Trailer Awards	6	12
Grammy Awards	1	1
Grande Prêmio do Cinema Brasileiro	1	1
Hollywood Critics Association Awards	1	5
Hollywood Film Awards	2	2
Hollywood Music in Media Awards	0	1
Hollywood Professional Association Awards	0	2
Houston Film Critics Society Awards	0	2
Humanitas Prize	1	1
IndieWire Critics Poll	1	1
International Film Music Critics Association Awards	1	1
Leeds International Film Festival Awards	1	1
Location Managers Guild Awards	0	1
London Film Critics' Circle Awards	0	1
National Board of Review Awards	1	1
New York Film Critics Online Awards	1	1
Online Film Critics Society Awards	1	2
Producers Guild of America Awards	0	1
San Diego Film Critics Society Awards	2	6
San Francisco Bay Area Film Critics Circle Awards	1	2
Satellite Awards	0	2
Saturn Awards	0	4
Screen Actors Guild Awards	0	2
Seattle Film Critics Society Awards	1	2
Society of Composers & Lyricists Awards	0	1
St. Louis Film Critics Association Awards	1	5
Toronto International Film Festival Awards	1	1
Turkish Film Critics Association Awards	1	1
UK Jewish Film Festival Awards	0	1
USC Scripter Awards	0	1
Washington D.C. Area Film Critics Association Awards	1	5
Webby Awards	0	1
Writers Guild of America Awards	1	1
Young Artist Awards	1	1

Totals (Note: Certain award groups do not simply award one winner. They acknowledge several different recipients, have runners-up, and have third place. Since this is a specific recognition and is different from losing an award, runner-up mentions are considered wins in this award tally. For simplification and to avoid errors, each award in this list has been presumed to have had a prior nomination.)
- Wins: 42
- Nominations: 126

Jojo Rabbit is a 2019 satirical drama film written and directed by Taika Waititi, who adapted the screenplay from Christine Leunens's 2008 book Caging Skies. It stars Roman Griffin Davis as Johannes "Jojo" Betzler, a ten-year-old Hitler Youth member who finds out that his mother, Rosie (Scarlett Johansson), is hiding a Jewish girl, Elsa (Thomasin McKenzie), in their attic. He then begins to question his beliefs while dealing with the intervention of his imaginary friend, a buffoonish version of Adolf Hitler (Waititi). The film also features Sam Rockwell, Rebel Wilson, Stephen Merchant, and Alfie Allen.

Jojo Rabbit premiered at the 44th Toronto International Film Festival on September 8, 2019, where it won the People's Choice Award. The film was released theatrically by Fox Searchlight Pictures in the United States on October 18, opening in five theatres before expanding over the following weeks. It was released in New Zealand on October 24 and in most other territories in January and February 2020. (Note: A scheduled theatrical release of Jojo Rabbit in China of February 12, 2020, was postponed, following restrictions due to the COVID-19 pandemic. It later saw a limited release from July 31 to August 27, 2020.) Produced on a budget of $14 million, the film grossed $90.3 million worldwide during its original theatrical run, with a 2023 re-release in New Zealand bringing its total gross up to $93.6 million. The film received mixed reviews from critics. (Note: Attributed to multiple sources:) Some lauded the satire and humor, (Note: Attributed to multiple sources:) with praise also directed towards the writing and acting. (Note: Attributed to multiple sources:) Others criticised how the film handled the sensitivities of the subject matter, taking aim at the comedy, inconsistent tone, and lack of historical accuracy. (Note: Attributed to multiple sources:) On the review aggregator website Rotten Tomatoes, the film holds an approval rating of 80% based on 430 reviews. Metacritic, which uses a weighted average, assigned the film a score of 58 out of 100 from 57 critics, indicating "mixed or average reviews".

Jojo Rabbit garnered awards and nominations in various categories, with particular recognition for the screenplay, acting, and production elements. At the 92nd Academy Awards, the film received six nominations, including Best Picture. Waititi won the Academy Award for Best Adapted Screenplay, making him the first person of indigenous descent to do so. He also won Best Adapted Screenplay at the 73rd British Academy Film Awards, where the film was nominated in six categories. Jojo Rabbit earned a further seven nominations at the 25th Critics' Choice Awards, where debutant Roman Griffin Davis won Best Young Performer. The film also received two nominations at the 77th Golden Globe Awards and won Best Compilation Soundtrack for Visual Media at the 63rd Annual Grammy Awards. Both the American Film Institute and the National Board of Review named Jojo Rabbit one of the Top Ten Films of 2019.

== Accolades ==
Accolades received by Jojo Rabbit
Award	Date of ceremony	Category	Recipient(s)	Result	Refs
AACTA International Awards	January 3, 2020	Best Screenplay	Taika Waititi	Won	
Academy Awards	February 9, 2020	Best Picture	Carthew Neal, Taika Waititi and Chelsea Winstanley	Nominated	
Academy Awards	February 9, 2020	Best Supporting Actress	Scarlett Johansson	Nominated	
Academy Awards	February 9, 2020	Best Adapted Screenplay	Taika Waititi	Won	
Academy Awards	February 9, 2020	Best Costume Design	Mayes C. Rubeo	Nominated	
Academy Awards	February 9, 2020	Best Film Editing	Tom Eagles	Nominated	
Academy Awards	February 9, 2020	Best Production Design	Ra Vincent and Nora Sopková	Nominated	
Alliance of Women Film Journalists EDA Awards	January 10, 2020	Best Picture	Jojo Rabbit	Nominated	
Alliance of Women Film Journalists EDA Awards	January 10, 2020	Best Adapted Screenplay	Taika Waititi	Nominated	
American Cinema Editors Eddie Awards	January 17, 2020	Best Edited Feature Film – Comedy or Musical	Tom Eagles	Won	
American Film Institute Awards	January 3, 2020	Top 10 Films of the Year	Jojo Rabbit	Won (Note: This award does not have a single winner, but recognizes multiple films.)	
Art Directors Guild Awards	February 1, 2020	Excellence in Production Design for a Period Film	Ra Vincent	Nominated	
Artios Awards	January 30, 2020	Studio or Independent – Comedy	Des Hamilton	Won	
Austin Film Critics Association Awards	January 7, 2020	Best Film	Jojo Rabbit	8th Place	
Austin Film Critics Association Awards	January 7, 2020	Best Supporting Actress	Scarlett Johansson	Nominated	
Austin Film Critics Association Awards	January 7, 2020	Best Adapted Screenplay	Taika Waititi	Nominated	
Bodil Awards	May 28, 2021	Best American Film	Jojo Rabbit	Nominated	
British Academy Film Awards	February 2, 2020	Best Actress in a Supporting Role	Scarlett Johansson	Nominated	
British Academy Film Awards	February 2, 2020	Best Adapted Screenplay	Taika Waititi	Won	
British Academy Film Awards	February 2, 2020	Best Costume Design	Mayes C. Rubeo	Nominated	
British Academy Film Awards	February 2, 2020	Best Editing	Tom Eagles	Nominated	
British Academy Film Awards	February 2, 2020	Best Original Score	Michael Giacchino	Nominated	
British Academy Film Awards	February 2, 2020	Best Production Design	Ra Vincent and Nora Sopková	Nominated	
Chicago Film Critics Association Awards	December 14, 2019	Most Promising Performer	Roman Griffin Davis	Nominated	
Chicago Film Critics Association Awards	December 14, 2019	Best Adapted Screenplay	Taika Waititi	Nominated	
Chlotrudis Awards	March 25, 2020	Best Use of Music in Film	Michael Giacchino	Nominated	
Cinema for Peace Awards	February 23, 2020	Cinema for Peace Award for The Most Valuable Film of the Year	Jojo Rabbit	Nominated	
Cork International Film Festival Awards	November 17, 2019	Audience Award	Mayes C. Rubeo	Nominated	
Costume Designers Guild Awards	January 28, 2020	Excellence in Period Film	Mayes C. Rubeo	Won	
Critics' Choice Movie Awards	January 12, 2020	Best Picture	Jojo Rabbit	Nominated	
Critics' Choice Movie Awards	January 12, 2020	Best Supporting Actress	Scarlett Johansson	Nominated	
Critics' Choice Movie Awards	January 12, 2020	Best Young Actor/Actress	Roman Griffin Davis	Won	
Critics' Choice Movie Awards	January 12, 2020	Best Young Actor/Actress	Thomasin McKenzie	Nominated	
Critics' Choice Movie Awards	January 12, 2020	Best Young Actor/Actress	Archie Yates	Nominated	
Critics' Choice Movie Awards	January 12, 2020	Best Adapted Screenplay	Taika Waititi	Nominated	
Critics' Choice Movie Awards	January 12, 2020	Best Comedy	Jojo Rabbit	Nominated	
Dallas–Fort Worth Film Critics Association Awards	December 16, 2019	Best Film	Jojo Rabbit	6th Place	
Detroit Film Critics Society Awards	December 9, 2019	Best Film	Jojo Rabbit	Nominated	
Detroit Film Critics Society Awards	December 9, 2019	Best Director	Taika Waititi	Nominated	
Detroit Film Critics Society Awards	December 9, 2019	Best Supporting Actress	Scarlett Johansson	Nominated	
Directors Guild of America Awards	January 25, 2020	Outstanding Directing – Feature Film	Taika Waititi	Nominated	
Fantastic Fest Awards	September 25, 2019	Audience Award	Jojo Rabbit	3rd Place	
Florida Film Critics Circle Awards	December 23, 2019	Best Supporting Actress	Scarlett Johansson	Nominated	
Florida Film Critics Circle Awards	December 23, 2019	Best Adapted Screenplay	Taika Waititi	Nominated	
Florida Film Critics Circle Awards	December 23, 2019	Pauline Kael Breakout Award	Roman Griffin Davis	Nominated	
Georgia Film Critics Association Awards	January 10, 2020	Best Adapted Screenplay	Taika Waititi	Nominated	
Golden Globe Awards	January 5, 2020	Best Motion Picture – Musical or Comedy	Jojo Rabbit	Nominated	
Golden Globe Awards	January 5, 2020	Best Actor – Motion Picture Musical or Comedy	Roman Griffin Davis	Nominated	
Golden Panda Awards	September 20, 2023	Best Film	Jojo Rabbit	Won	
Golden Panda Awards	September 20, 2023	Best Director – Film Category	Taika Waititi	Nominated	
Golden Panda Awards	September 20, 2023	Best Original Score – Film Category	Michael Giacchino	Won	
Golden Panda Awards	September 20, 2023	Best Screenplay – Film Category	Taika Waititi	Nominated	
Golden Reel Awards	January 19, 2020	Outstanding Achievement in Sound Editing – Dialogue and ADR for Feature Film	Ai-Ling Lee, Tobias Poppe, Susan Dawes, David V. Butler and Helen Luttrell	Nominated	
Golden Reel Awards	January 19, 2020	Outstanding Achievement in Sound Editing – Music Underscore	Paul Apelgren	Won	
Golden Trailer Awards	July 22, 2021	Best Comedy	Searchlight Pictures and Mark Woollen & Associates (for "Imaginary")	Nominated	
Golden Trailer Awards	July 22, 2021	Best Independent Trailer	Searchlight Pictures and Motive (for "Teaser")	Nominated	
Golden Trailer Awards	July 22, 2021	Best Teaser	Searchlight Pictures and Motive (for "Teaser")	Won	
Golden Trailer Awards	July 22, 2021	Best Comedy TV Spot (for a Feature Film)	Searchlight Pictures and Motive (for "Bedtime Stories")	Nominated	
Golden Trailer Awards	July 22, 2021	Best Comedy TV Spot (for a Feature Film)	Searchlight Pictures and Mark Woollen & Associates (for "Unsinn")	Nominated	
Golden Trailer Awards	July 22, 2021	Best Graphics in a TV Spot (for a Feature Film)	Searchlight Pictures and Mark Woollen & Associates (for "Unsinn")	Won	
Golden Trailer Awards	July 22, 2021	Best Independent TV Spot (for a Feature Film)	Searchlight Pictures and Mark Woollen & Associates (for "Unsinn")	Nominated	
Golden Trailer Awards	July 22, 2021	Best Independent TV Spot (for a Feature Film)	Searchlight Pictures and Motive (for "What Is This")	Nominated	
Golden Trailer Awards	July 22, 2021	Most Original TV Spot (for a Feature Film)	Searchlight Pictures and Motive (for "Bedtime Stories")	Won	
Golden Trailer Awards	July 22, 2021	Best Comedy Poster	Searchlight Pictures, Lindeman & Associates and Eclipse (for "Cast Poster")	Won	
Golden Trailer Awards	July 22, 2021	Best Viral Campaign for a Feature Film	Searchlight Pictures (for "Downfall Meme")	Won	
Golden Trailer Awards	July 22, 2021	Best Comedy/Drama Trailerbyte for a Feature Film	Searchlight Pictures, Motive and Chen Liang (for "Fairy Tales with Shitler")	Won	
Grammy Awards	March 14, 2021	Best Compilation Soundtrack for Visual Media	Jojo Rabbit (Various Artists)	Won	
Grande Prêmio do Cinema Brasileiro	November 28, 2021	Best International Film	Jojo Rabbit	Won	
Hollywood Critics Association Awards	January 9, 2020	Best Picture	Jojo Rabbit	Nominated	
Hollywood Critics Association Awards	January 9, 2020	Best Director	Taika Waititi	Nominated	
Hollywood Critics Association Awards	January 9, 2020	Best Adapted Screenplay	Taika Waititi	Won	
Hollywood Critics Association Awards	January 9, 2020	Best Performance by an Actor or Actress 23 and Under	Roman Griffin Davis	Nominated	
Hollywood Critics Association Awards	January 9, 2020	Best Performance by an Actor or Actress 23 and Under	Thomasin McKenzie	Nominated	
Hollywood Film Awards	November 3, 2019	Hollywood Cinematography Award	Mihai Mălaimare Jr.	Won	
Hollywood Film Awards	November 3, 2019	Hollywood Production Design Award	Ra Vincent	Won	
Hollywood Music in Media Awards	November 23, 2019	Best Original Score in a Feature Film	Michael Giacchino	Nominated	
Hollywood Professional Association Awards	November 19, 2020	Outstanding Color Grading – Theatrical Feature	Tim Stipan (Company 3)	Nominated	
Hollywood Professional Association Awards	November 19, 2020	Outstanding Editing – Theatrical Feature	Tom Eagles	Nominated	
Houston Film Critics Society Awards	January 2, 2020	Best Picture	Jojo Rabbit	Nominated	
Houston Film Critics Society Awards	January 2, 2020	Best Supporting Actress	Scarlett Johansson	Nominated	
Humanitas Prize	January 24, 2020	Comedy or Musical Feature Film	Jojo Rabbit	Won	
IndieWire Critics Poll	December 16, 2019	Best Actress	Scarlett Johansson	Runner-up	
International Film Music Critics Association Awards	February 20, 2020	Best Original Score for a Comedy Film	Michael Giacchino	Won	
Leeds International Film Festival Awards	November 11, 2019	Audience Award – Fiction Feature	Jojo Rabbit	Won	
Location Managers Guild Awards	October 24, 2020	Outstanding Locations in a Period Film	Jan Adler	Nominated	
London Film Critics' Circle Awards	January 30, 2020	Young British/Irish Performer of the Year	Roman Griffin Davis	Nominated	
National Board of Review Awards	3 December 2019	Top Ten Films	Jojo Rabbit	Won	
New York Film Critics Online Awards	December 7, 2019	Top 10 Films of the Year	Jojo Rabbit	Won	
Online Film Critics Society Awards	January 6, 2020	Best Picture	Jojo Rabbit	10th Place	
Online Film Critics Society Awards	January 6, 2020	Best Adapted Screenplay	Taika Waititi	Nominated	
Producers Guild of America Awards	January 18, 2020	Best Theatrical Motion Picture	Jojo Rabbit	Nominated	
San Diego Film Critics Society Awards	December 9, 2019	Best Supporting Actress	Thomasin McKenzie	Nominated	
San Diego Film Critics Society Awards	December 9, 2019	Best Comedic Performance	Taika Waititi	Runner-up	
San Diego Film Critics Society Awards	December 9, 2019	Best Comedic Performance	Sam Rockwell	Nominated	
San Diego Film Critics Society Awards	December 9, 2019	Best Adapted Screenplay	Taika Waititi	Nominated	
San Diego Film Critics Society Awards	December 9, 2019	Best Use of Music	Jojo Rabbit	Runner-up	
San Diego Film Critics Society Awards	December 9, 2019	Breakthrough Artist	Roman Griffin Davis	Nominated	
San Francisco Bay Area Film Critics Circle Awards	December 16, 2019	Best Adapted Screenplay	Taika Waititi	Won	
San Francisco Bay Area Film Critics Circle Awards	December 16, 2019	Best Supporting Actress	Scarlett Johansson	Nominated	
Satellite Awards	December 19, 2019	Best Actor – Motion Picture Comedy/Musical	Taika Waititi	Nominated	
Satellite Awards	December 19, 2019	Best Adapted Screenplay	Taika Waititi	Nominated	
Saturn Awards	October 26, 2021	Best International Film	Jojo Rabbit	Nominated	
Saturn Awards	October 26, 2021	Best Performance by a Younger Actor	Roman Griffin Davis	Nominated	
Saturn Awards	October 26, 2021	Best Production Design	Ra Vincent	Nominated	
Saturn Awards	October 26, 2021	Best Costume Design	Mayes C. Rubeo	Nominated	
Screen Actors Guild Awards	January 19, 2020	Outstanding Performance by a Cast in a Motion Picture	Alfie Allen, Roman Griffin Davis, Scarlett Johansson, Thomasin McKenzie, Stephen Merchant, Sam Rockwell, Taika Waititi and Rebel Wilson	Nominated	
Screen Actors Guild Awards	January 19, 2020	Outstanding Performance by a Female Actor in a Supporting Role	Scarlett Johansson	Nominated	
Seattle Film Critics Society Awards	December 16, 2019	Best Youth Performance	Thomasin McKenzie	Won	
Seattle Film Critics Society Awards	December 16, 2019	Best Youth Performance	Roman Griffin Davis	Nominated	
Society of Composers & Lyricists Awards	January 7, 2020	Outstanding Original Score for a Studio Film	Michael Giacchino	Nominated	
St. Louis Film Critics Association Awards	December 15, 2019	Best Film	Jojo Rabbit	Nominated	
St. Louis Film Critics Association Awards	December 15, 2019	Best Comedy Film	Jojo Rabbit	Nominated	
St. Louis Film Critics Association Awards	December 15, 2019	Best Director	Taika Waititi	Nominated	
St. Louis Film Critics Association Awards	December 15, 2019	Best Supporting Actress	Scarlett Johansson	Nominated	
St. Louis Film Critics Association Awards	December 15, 2019	Best Adapted Screenplay	Taika Waititi	Runner-up (Note: Tied with Greta Gerwig for Little Women)	
Toronto International Film Festival Awards	September 15, 2019	Grolsch People's Choice Award	Jojo Rabbit	Won	
Turkish Film Critics Association Awards	March 28, 2021	Best Foreign Film	Jojo Rabbit	9th Place	
UK Jewish Film Festival Awards	January 25, 2020	Dorfman Best Film Award	Jojo Rabbit	Nominated	
USC Scripter Awards	January 25, 2020	Best Film Adaptation	Jojo Rabbit (adapted from Caging Skies by Christine Leunens)	Nominated	
Washington D.C. Area Film Critics Association Awards	8 December 2019	Best Adapted Screenplay	Taika Waititi	Nominated	
Washington D.C. Area Film Critics Association Awards	8 December 2019	Best Supporting Actress	Scarlett Johansson	Nominated	
Washington D.C. Area Film Critics Association Awards	8 December 2019	Best Youth Performance	Thomasin McKenzie	Nominated	
Washington D.C. Area Film Critics Association Awards	8 December 2019	Best Youth Performance	Roman Griffin Davis	Won	
Washington D.C. Area Film Critics Association Awards	8 December 2019	Best Production Design	Ra Vincent and Nora Sopková	Nominated	
Webby Awards	May 19, 2020	Social – Television & Film	Searchlight Pictures and Everybody at Once (for "Jojo Rabbit's Close Friends")	Nominated	
Writers Guild of America Awards	February 1, 2020	Best Adapted Screenplay	Taika Waititi	Won	
Young Artist Awards	November 24, 2020	Outstanding Breakthrough Performance Award	Roman Griffin Davis, Archie Yates and Thomasin McKenzie	Won	
