= Chicago Film Critics Association Awards 2019 =

Annual US film awards ceremony

32nd Chicago Film Critics Association Awards
- Date: December 14, 2019
- Site: Chicago, Illinois, U.S.

Highlights
- Best Picture: Parasite
- Most awards: Little Women (4); Parasite (4)
- Most nominations: Once Upon a Time in Hollywood (9)

The 32nd Chicago Film Critics Association Awards were announced on December 14, 2019. The awards honor the best in film for 2019. The nominations were announced on December 12, 2019. Once Upon a Time in Hollywood received the most nominations (9), followed by The Irishman (8).

== Winners and nominees ==
The winners and nominees for the 32nd Chicago Film Critics Association Awards are as follows:

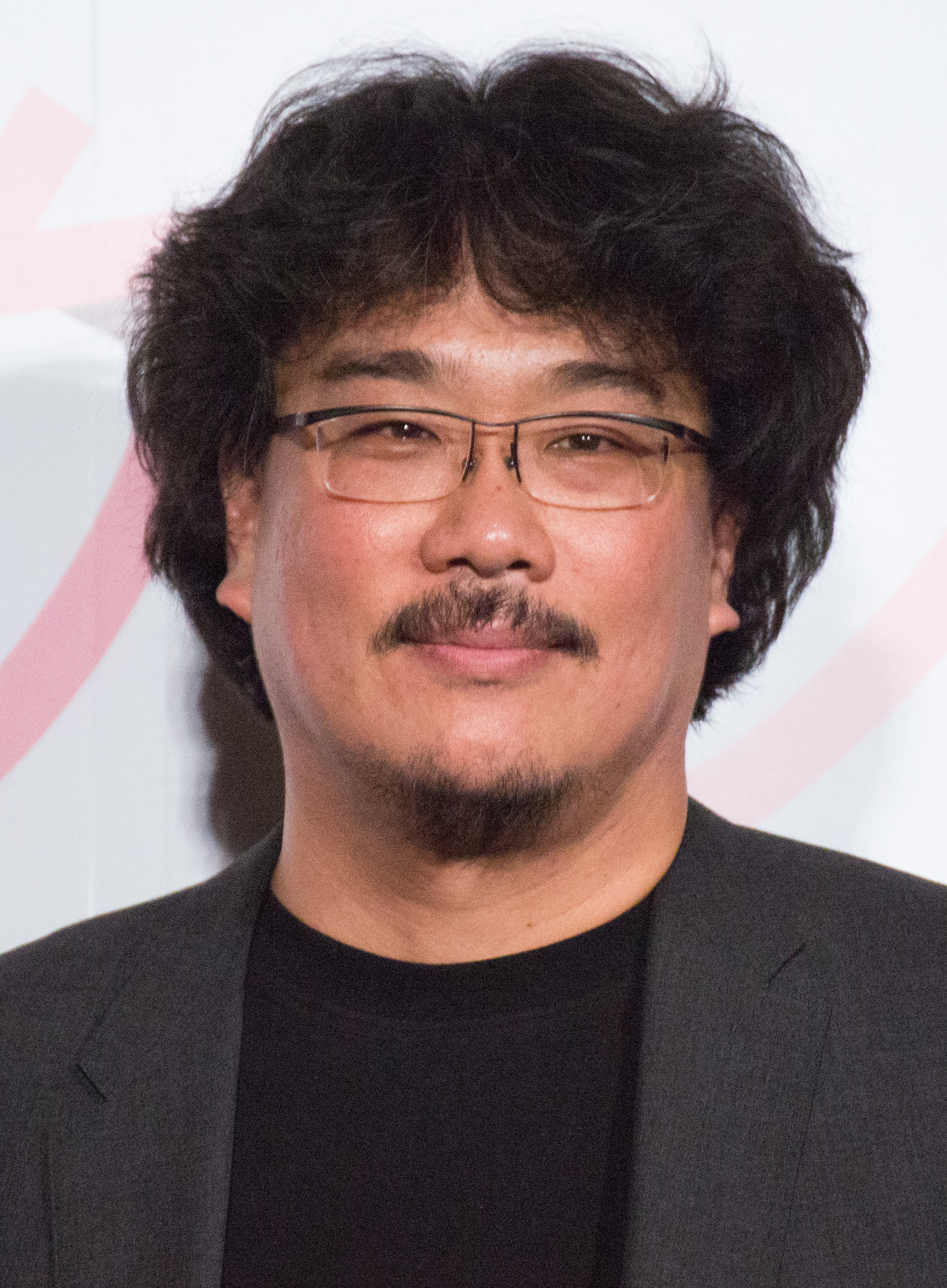
Bong Joon-ho, Best Director and Best Foreign Language Film winner, and Best Original Screenplay co-winner

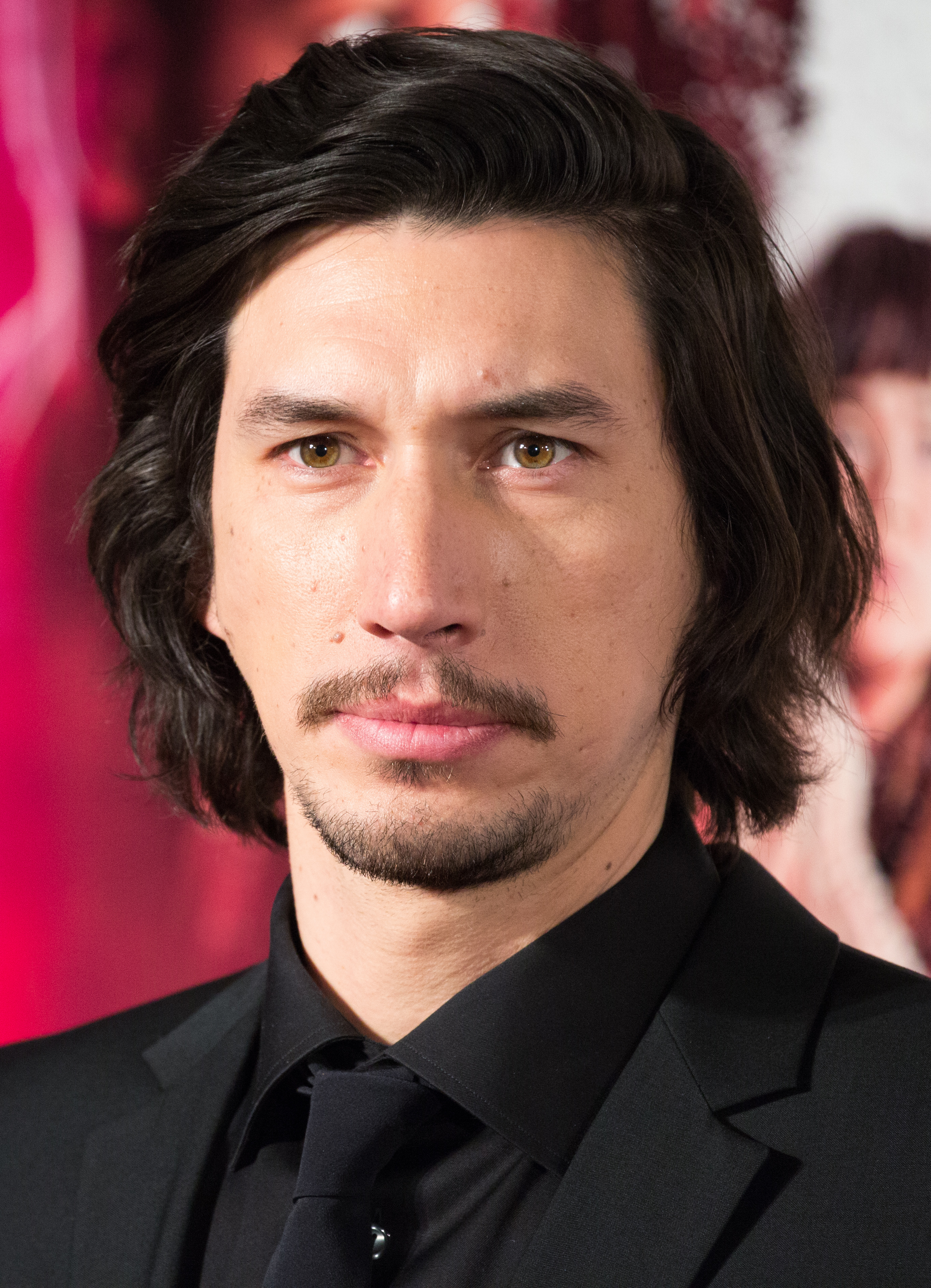
Adam Driver, Best Actor winner

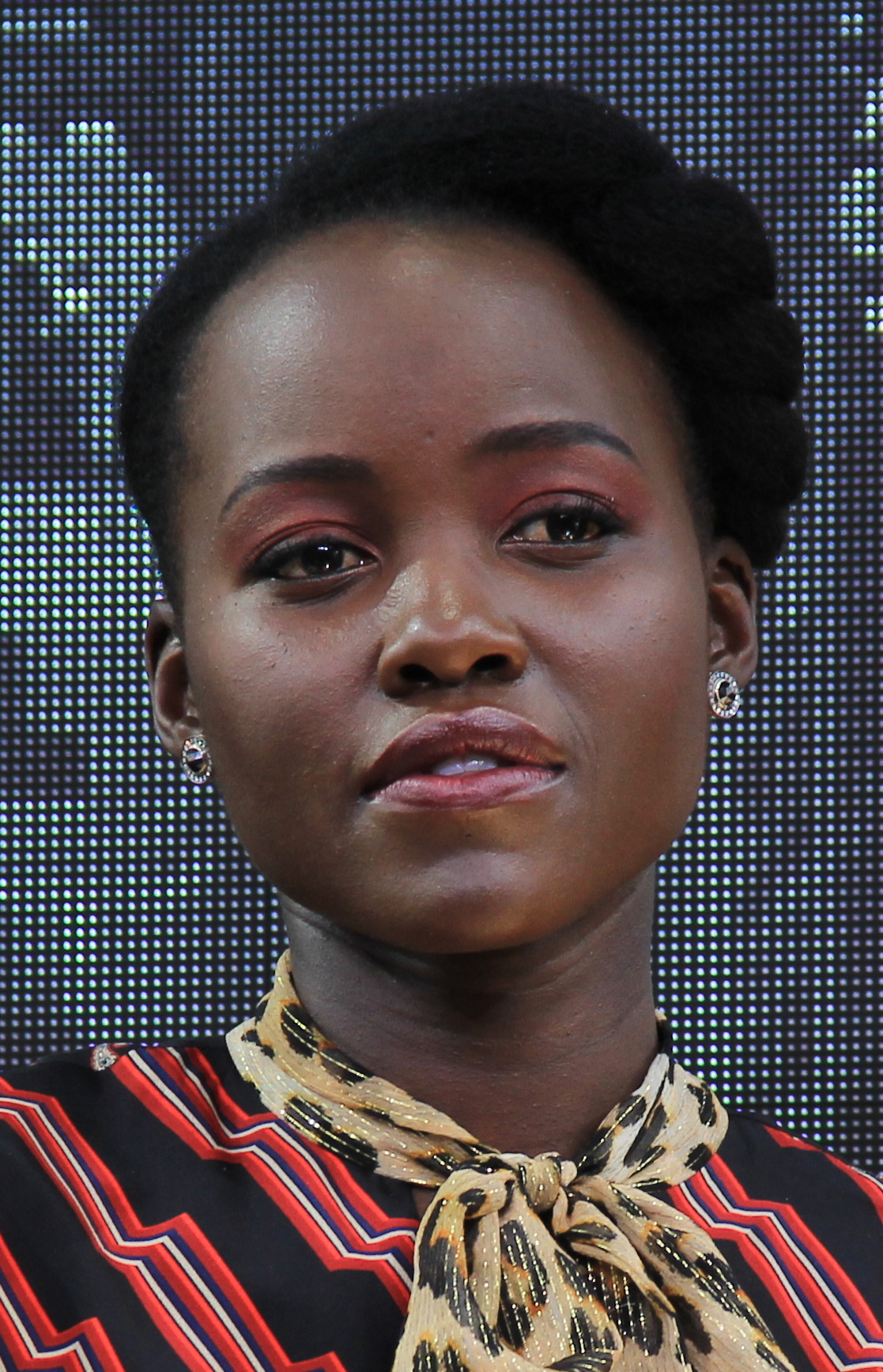
Lupita Nyong'o, Best Actress winner

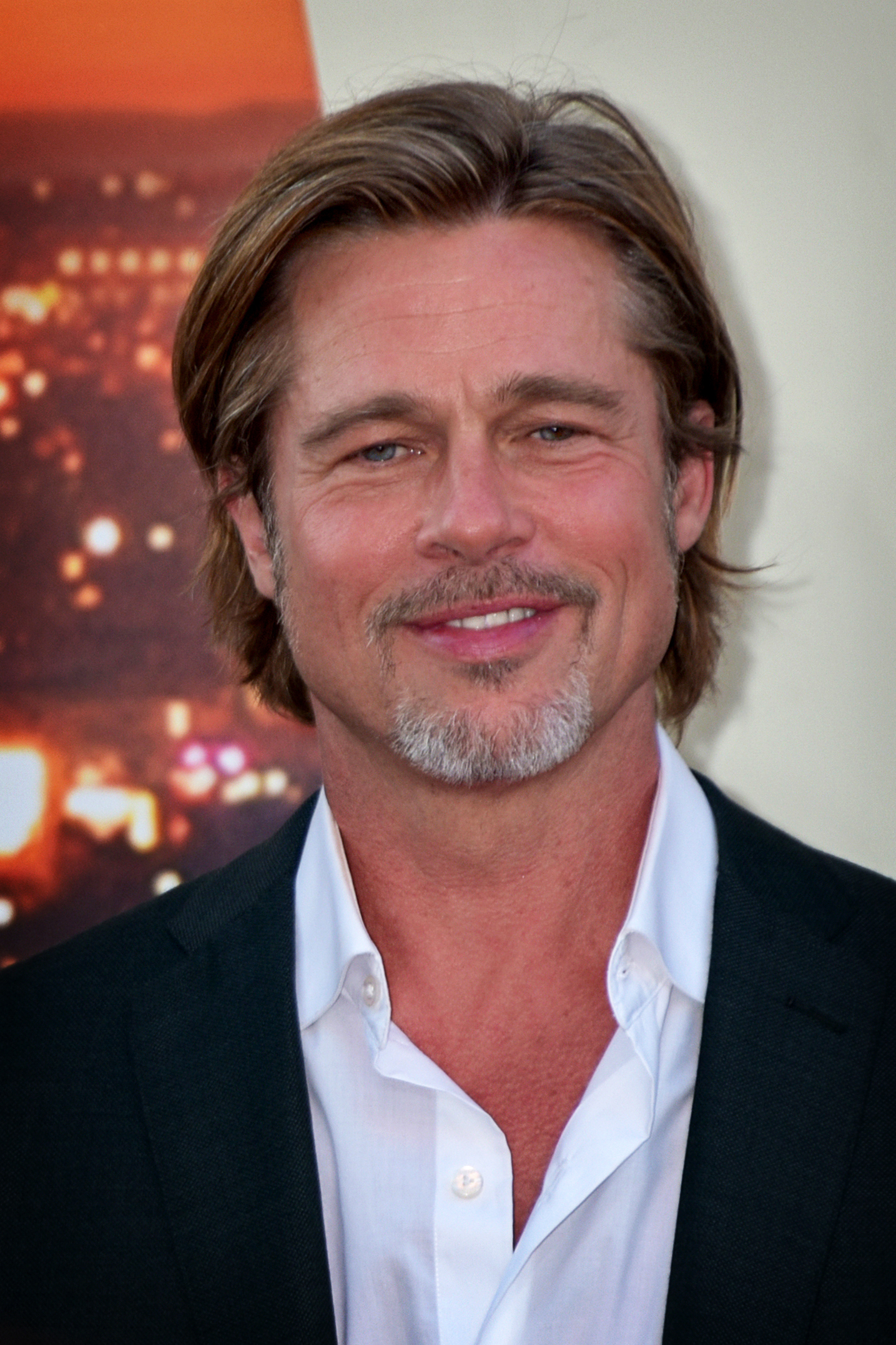
Brad Pitt, Best Supporting Actor winner

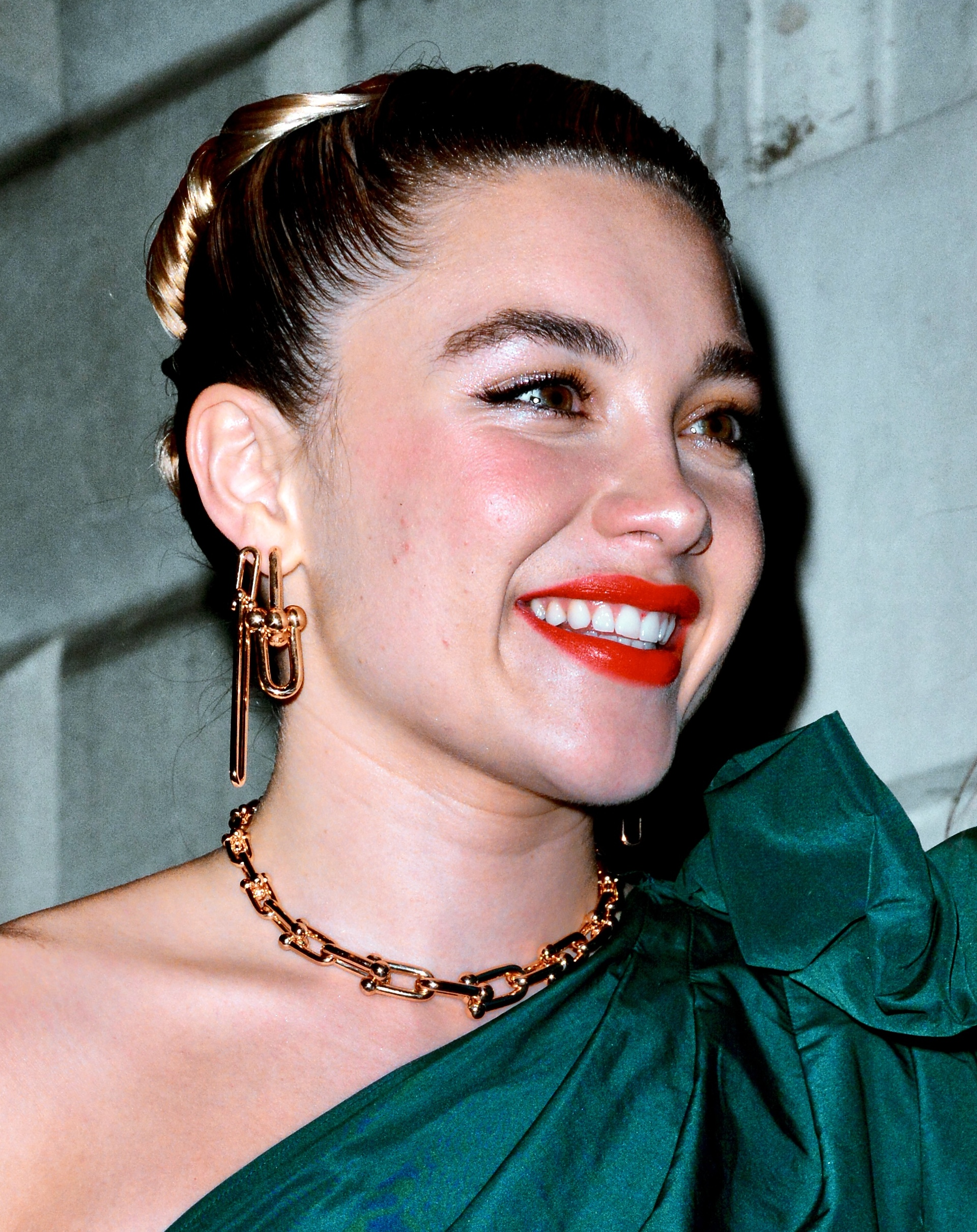
Florence Pugh, Best Supporting Actress winner

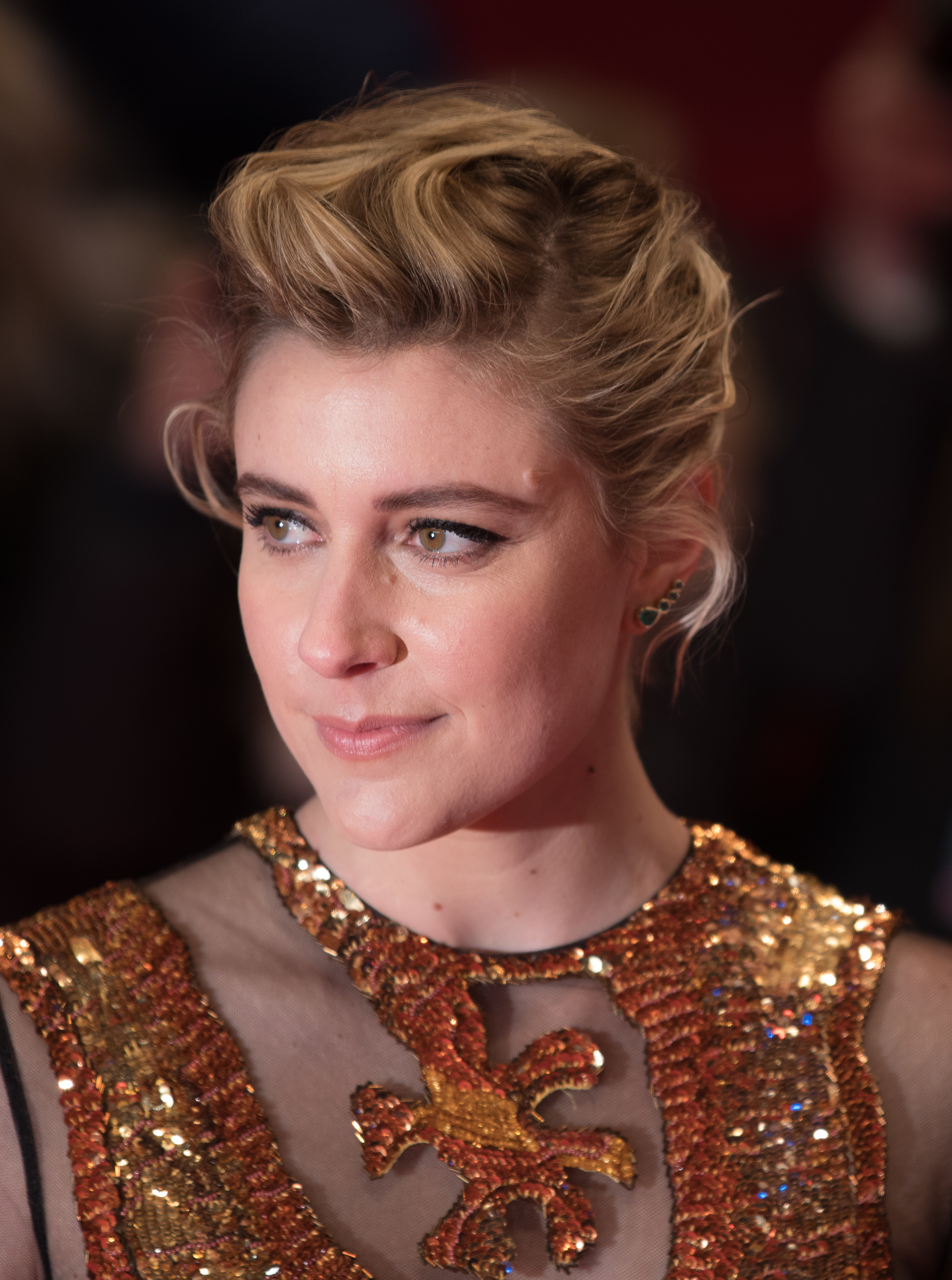
Greta Gerwig, Best Adapted Screenplay winner

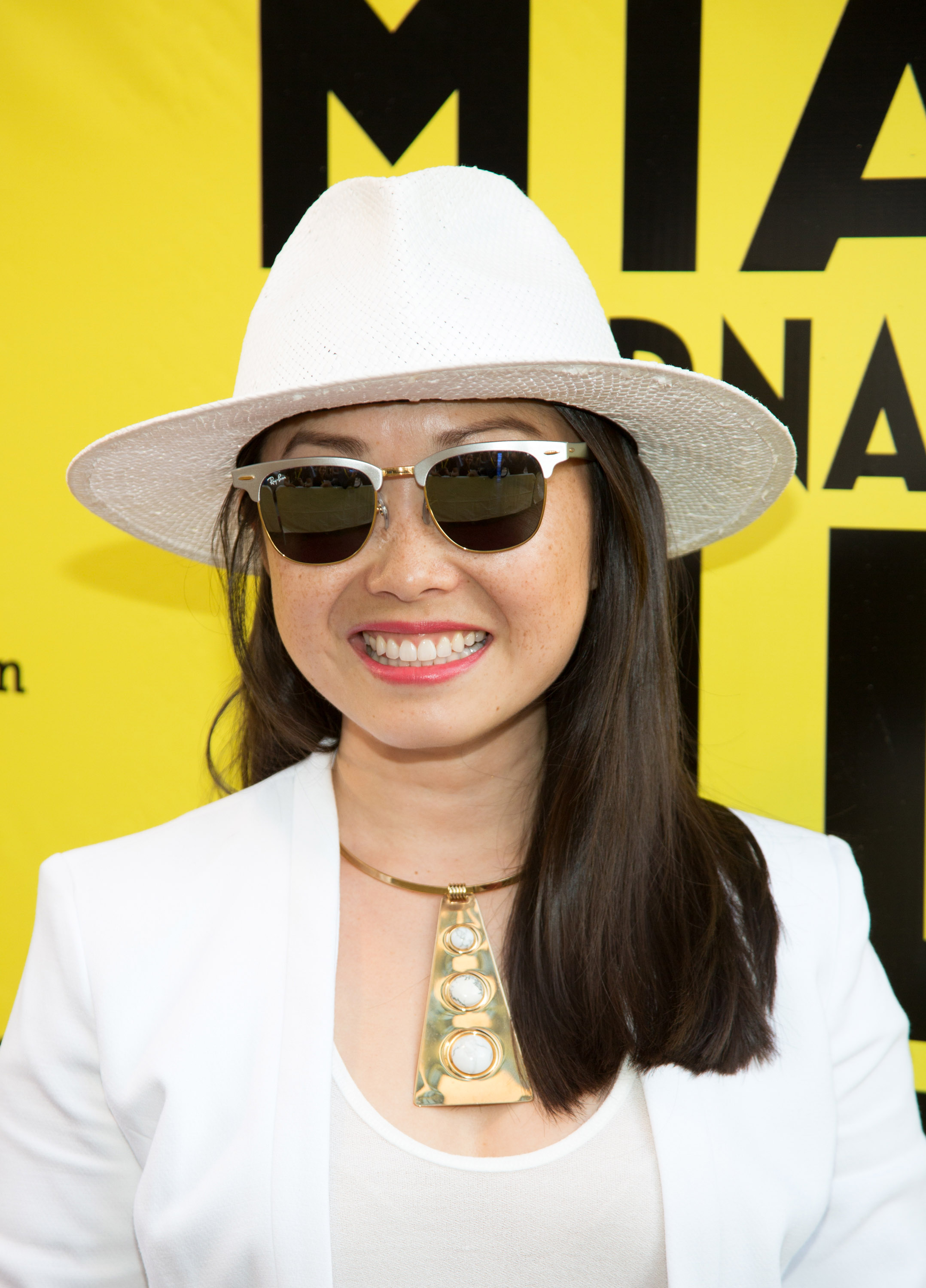
Lulu Wang, Milos Stehlik Breakthrough Filmmaker Award winner

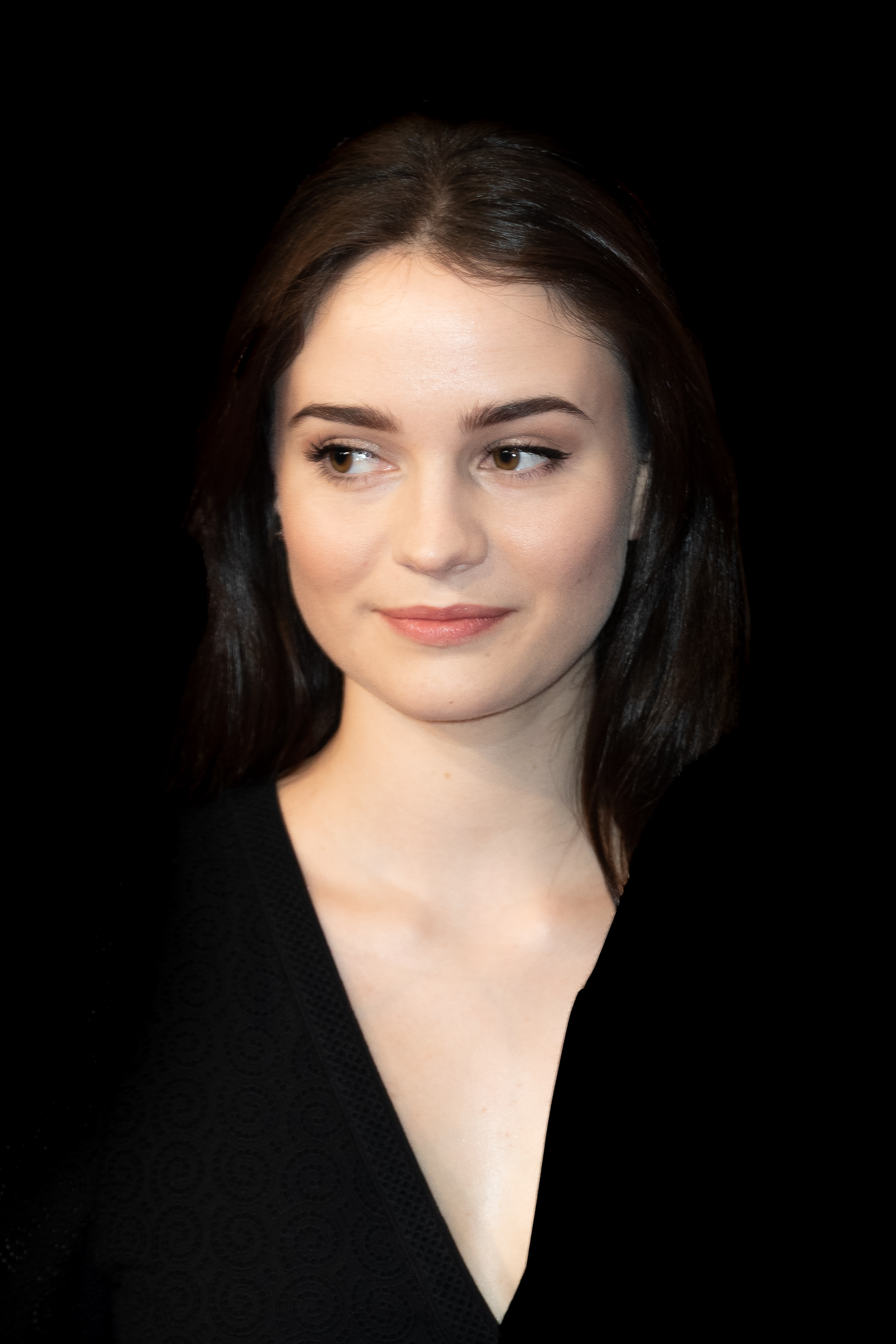
Aisling Franciosi, Most Promising Performer winner

=== Awards ===
Best Film	Best Director
Parasite – Bong Joon-ho and Kwak Sin-ae; The Irishman – Robert De Niro, Emma Tillinger Koskoff, Jane Rosenthal, and Martin Scorsese; Little Women – Amy Pascal; Marriage Story – Noah Baumbach and David Heyman; Once Upon a Time in Hollywood – David Heyman, Shannon McIntosh, and Quentin Tarantino	Bong Joon-ho – Parasite; Noah Baumbach – Marriage Story; Greta Gerwig – Little Women; Martin Scorsese – The Irishman; Quentin Tarantino – Once Upon a Time in Hollywood
Best Actor	Best Actress
Adam Driver – Marriage Story as Charlie Barber; Antonio Banderas – Pain and Glory as Salvador Mallo; Robert De Niro – The Irishman as Frank Sheeran; Joaquin Phoenix – Joker as Arthur Fleck / Joker; Adam Sandler – Uncut Gems as Howard Ratner	Lupita Nyong'o – Us as Adelaide Wilson / Red; Awkwafina – The Farewell as Billi Wang; Scarlett Johansson – Marriage Story as Nicole Barber; Elisabeth Moss – Her Smell as Becky Something; Renée Zellweger – Judy as Judy Garland
Best Supporting Actor	Best Supporting Actress
Brad Pitt – Once Upon a Time in Hollywood as Cliff Booth; Tom Hanks – A Beautiful Day in the Neighborhood as Fred Rogers; Shia LaBeouf – Honey Boy as James Lort; Al Pacino – The Irishman as Jimmy Hoffa; Joe Pesci – The Irishman as Russell Bufalino	Florence Pugh – Little Women as Amy March; Laura Dern – Marriage Story as Nora Fanshaw; Jennifer Lopez – Hustlers as Ramona Vega; Zhao Shu-zhen – The Farewell as Nai Nai; Cho Yeo-jeong – Parasite as Choi Yeon-gyo
Best Original Screenplay	Best Adapted Screenplay
Parasite – Bong Joon-ho and Han Jin-won; The Farewell – Lulu Wang; Knives Out – Rian Johnson; Marriage Story – Noah Baumbach; Once Upon a Time in Hollywood – Quentin Tarantino	Little Women – Greta Gerwig (based on the novel by Louisa May Alcott); A Beautiful Day in the Neighborhood – Micah Fitzerman-Blue and Noah Harpster (inspired by the article "Can You Say ... Hero?" by Tom Junod); Hustlers – Lorene Scafaria (based on the article "The Hustlers at Scores: The Ex-Strippers Who Stole From (Mostly) Rich Men and Gave to, Well, Themselves" by Jessica Pressler); The Irishman – Steven Zaillian (based on the book I Heard You Paint Houses: Frank "The Irishman" Sheeran and Closing the Case on Jimmy Hoffa by Charles Brandt); Jojo Rabbit – Taika Waititi (based on the novel Caging Skies by Christine Leunens)
Best Animated Film	Best Foreign Language Film
Toy Story 4 – Josh Cooley, Mark Nielsen, and Jonas Rivera; Frozen 2 – Peter Del Vecho; How to Train Your Dragon: The Hidden World – Bonnie Arnold, Dean DeBlois, and Brad Lewis; I Lost My Body – Jérémy Clapin and Marc du Pontavice; Missing Link – Chris Butler, Travis Knight, and Arianne Sutner	Parasite (South Korea) in Korean – Directed by Bong Joon-ho; The Farewell (United States) in Mandarin and English – Directed by Lulu Wang; Pain and Glory (Spain) in Spanish – Directed by Pedro Almodóvar; Portrait of a Lady on Fire (France) in French – Directed by Céline Sciamma; Transit (Germany) in German and French – Directed by Christian Petzold
Best Documentary Film	Best Original Score
Apollo 11 – Evan Krauss, Todd Douglas Miller, and Thomas Petersen; American Factory – Steven Bognar, Jeff Reichert, and Julia Reichert; For Sama – Waad Al-Kateab and Edward Watts; Hail Satan? – Gabriel Sedgwick; Honeyland – Atanas Georgiev, Tamara Kotevska, and Ljubomir Stefanov	Little Women – Alexandre Desplat; 1917 – Thomas Newman; Marriage Story – Randy Newman; Uncut Gems – Daniel Lopatin; Us – Michael Abels
Best Art Direction	Best Costume Design
Once Upon a Time in Hollywood – Production Design: Barbara Ling; Set Decoration: Nancy Haigh; 1917 – Production Design: Dennis Gassner; Set Decoration: Lee Sandales; Knives Out – Production Design: David Crank; Set Decoration: David Schlesinger; Little Women – Production Design: Jess Gonchor; Set Decoration: Claire Kaufman; Parasite – Production Design: Lee Ha-jun; Set Decoration: Cho Won-woo	Little Women – Jacqueline Durran; Dolemite Is My Name – Ruth E. Carter; Once Upon a Time in Hollywood – Arianne Phillips; Portrait of a Lady on Fire – Dorothée Guiraud; Rocketman – Julian Day
Best Editing	Best Cinematography
The Irishman – Thelma Schoonmaker; 1917 – Lee Smith; Little Women – Nick Houy; Once Upon a Time in Hollywood – Fred Raskin; Uncut Gems – Ronald Bronstein and Benny Safdie	1917 – Roger Deakins; The Lighthouse – Jarin Blaschke; Once Upon a Time in Hollywood – Robert Richardson; Parasite – Hong Kyung-pyo; Portrait of a Lady on Fire – Claire Mathon
Best Use of Visual Effects	Milos Stehlik Breakthrough Filmmaker Award
Ad Astra; 1917; Avengers: Endgame; The Irishman; Midsommar	Lulu Wang – The Farewell; Mati Diop – Atlantics; Alma Har'el – Honey Boy; Joe Talbot – The Last Black Man in San Francisco; Olivia Wilde – Booksmart
Most Promising Performer	
Aisling Franciosi – The Nightingale; Julia Butters – Once Upon a Time in Hollywood; Roman Griffin Davis – Jojo Rabbit; Julia Fox – Uncut Gems; Taylor Russell – Waves	

== Awards breakdown ==
The following films received multiple nominations:

Nominations	Film
9	Once Upon a Time in Hollywood
8	The Irishman
8	Little Women
7	Marriage Story
7	Parasite
5	The Farewell
5	1917
4	Uncut Gems
3	Portrait of a Lady on Fire
2	A Beautiful Day in the Neighborhood
2	Honey Boy
2	Hustlers
2	Jojo Rabbit
2	Knives Out
2	Pain and Glory
2	Us

The following films received multiple wins:

Wins	Film
4	Little Women
4	Parasite
2	Once Upon a Time in Hollywood
