= San Diego Film Critics Society Awards 2019 =

Annual US film awards ceremony

24th San Diego Film Critics Society Awards
- Date: December 9, 2019
- Site: San Diego, California, U.S.

Highlights
- Best Picture: The Irishman
- Most awards: The Irishman / Marriage Story / Once Upon a Time in Hollywood / Dolemite Is My Name (2)
- Most nominations: The Irishman / Once Upon a Time in Hollywood (10)

The 24th San Diego Film Critics Society Awards were announced on December 9, 2019.

== Winners and nominees ==
=== Best Film ===
The Irishman

- 1917
- Joker
- Marriage Story
- Once Upon a Time in Hollywood

=== Best Director ===
Benny Safdie, Josh Safdie, Uncut Gems

- Noah Baumbach, Marriage Story
- Sam Mendes, 1917
- Martin Scorsese, The Irishman
- Quentin Tarantino, Once Upon a Time in Hollywood

=== Best Male Actor ===
Adam Driver, Marriage Story

Joaquin Phoenix, Joker

- Christian Bale, Ford V Ferrari
- Eddie Murphy, Dolemite Is My Name
- Adam Sandler, Uncut Gems

=== Best Female Actor ===
Lupita Nyong’o, Us

- Awkwafina, The Farewell
- Scarlett Johansson, Marriage Story
- Saoirse Ronan, Little Women
- Renée Zellweger, Judy

=== Best Supporting Actor ===
Joe Pesci, The Irishman

Brad Pitt, Once Upon a Time in Hollywood

- Wesley Snipes, Dolemite Is My Name
- Willem Dafoe, The Lighthouse
- Al Pacino, The Irishman

=== Best Supporting Actress ===
Zhao Shuzhen, The Farewell

- Octavia Spencer, Luce
- Laura Dern, Marriage Story
- Thomasin McKenzie, Jojo Rabbit
- Florence Pugh, Little Women

=== Best Comedic Performance ===
Wesley Snipes, Dolemite Is My Name

- Taika Waititi, Jojo Rabbit
- Daniel Craig, Knives Out
- Eddie Murphy, Dolemite Is My Name
- Sam Rockwell, Jojo Rabbit

=== Best Original Screenplay ===
Noah Baumbach, Marriage Story

- Bong Joon Ho, Jin Won Han, Parasite
- Rian Johnson, Knives Out
- Benny Safdie, Josh Safdie, Uncut Gems
- Quentin Tarantino, Once Upon a Time in Hollywood

=== Best Adapted Screenplay ===
J.C. Lee, Julius Onah, Luce

- Greta Gerwig, Little Women
- Todd Phillips, Scott Silver, Joker
- Taika Waititi, Christine Leunens, Jojo Rabbit
- Steven Zaillian, The Irishman

=== Best Documentary ===
Love, Antosha

- Apollo 11
- The Biggest Little Farm
- One Child Nation
- They Shall Not Grow Old

=== Best Animated Film ===
I Lost My Body

- Missing Link
- Abominable
- How to Train Your Dragon: The Hidden World
- Toy Story 4

=== Best Foreign-Language Film ===
Parasite

- Portrait of a Lady on Fire
- Transit
- The Farewell
- Pain and Glory

=== Best Costume Design ===
Ruth E. Carter, Dolemite Is My Name

- Julian Day, Rocketman
- Jacqueline Durran, Little Women
- Arianne Phillips, Once Upon a Time in Hollywood
- Anna Robbins, Downton Abbey

=== Best Editing ===
Andrew Buckland, Michael McCusker & Dirk Westervelt, Ford v Ferrari

- Jennifer Lame, Marriage Story
- Fred Raskin, Once Upon a Time in Hollywood
- Benny Safdie, Ronald Bronstein, Uncut Gems
- Thelma Schoonmaker, The Irishman

=== Best Cinematography ===
Jarin Blaschke, The Lighthouse

- Roger Deakins, 1917
- Hoyte Van Hoytema, Ad Astra
- Rodrigo Prieto, The Irishman
- Phedon Papamichael, Ford v Ferrari

=== Best Production Design ===
Dennis Gassner, 1917

- Jess Gonchor, Little Women
- Clay A. Griffith, Dolemite Is My Name
- Barbara Ling, Once Upon a Time in Hollywood
- Bob Shaw, The Irishman
- Donal Woods, Downton Abbey

=== Best Visual Effects ===
Ad Astra

- 1917
- The Aeronauts
- Avengers: Endgame
- The Irishman

=== Best Use of Music ===
Once Upon a Time in Hollywood

- Rocketman
- Jojo Rabbit
- Joker
- Yesterday

=== Best Ensemble ===
Knives Out

- Downton Abbey
- The Irishman
- Marriage Story
- Once Upon a Time in Hollywood

=== Breakthrough Artist ===
Florence Pugh, Little Women, Midsommar

- Jessie Buckley, Judy, Wild Rose
- Julia Butters, Once Upon a Time in Hollywood
- Roman Griffin Davis, Jojo Rabbit
- Kelvin Harrison Jr., Luce, Waves
