= Tom Eagles =

New Zealand film editor

- Occupation: Film editor
- Known for: Jojo Rabbit

Tom Eagles is a New Zealand film editor.

Eagles was nominated for an Academy Award for Best Film Editing and BAFTA Award for Best Editing for his editing of Taika Waititi's film, Jojo Rabbit (2019).

== Filmography ==
Year	Film	Director
2014	What We Do in the Shadows	Jemaine Clement and Taika Waititi
2016	Hunt for the Wilderpeople	Taika Waititi
2018	Wellington Paranormal	Jemaine Clement
2019	What We Do in the Shadows	Jemaine Clement
2019	Jojo Rabbit	Taika Waititi
2020	Shadow in the Cloud	Roseanne Liang
2021	On the Count of Three	Jerrod Carmichael
2021	The Harder They Fall	Jeymes Samuel
2023	Next Goal Wins	Taika Waititi
2023	The Book of Clarence	Jeymes Samuel
2025	Nuremberg	James Vanderbilt
2026	Klara and the Sun	Taika Waititi
