= Nora Sopková =

Czech set decorator

- Occupation: Set decorator

Nora Sopková is a Czech set decorator. She was nominated for an Academy Award in the category Best Production Design for the film Jojo Rabbit.

== Selected filmography ==
- Jojo Rabbit (2019; co-nominated with Ra Vincent)
