= Roman Griffin Davis =

English actor (born 2007)

- Born: 5 March 2007 (age 19); London, England, United Kingdom
- Citizenship: Great Britain
- Years active: 2019–present

Roman Griffin Davis (born 5 March 2007) is an English actor. He is best known for his title role in the film Jojo Rabbit (2019), for which he was nominated for a Golden Globe Award and won a Critics' Choice Award.

== Early life and career ==
Davis was born on 5 March 2007 in London. He is the son of cinematographer Ben Davis and writer-director Camille Griffin. He lives with his parents and brothers, twins Gilby and Hardy, in East Sussex. He went to Cumnor House School, Surrey, and Cranbrook Grammar School, Kent, until 2020. Davis made his acting debut in the 2019 satirical black comedy film Jojo Rabbit directed by Taika Waititi. His twin brothers are also in the film as Hitler Youth clones. Davis was nominated for various awards for his performance in Jojo Rabbit and won the Critics' Choice Movie Award for Best Young Performer and the Washington D.C. Area Film Critics Association Award for Best Breakthrough Performance. He starred in the 2021 comedy Silent Night directed and produced by his mother Camille Griffin.

== Filmography ==
| Year | Title | Role |
|---|---|---|
| 2019 | Jojo Rabbit | Jojo |
| 2021 | Silent Night | Art |
| 2023 | Last Ride | Devin |
| 2025 | The King of Kings | Walter Dickens |
| 2025 | The Long Walk | Adam “Curly” White |
| 2026 | Greenland 2: Migration | Nathan Garrity |
| 2026 | 500 Miles | Finn |
| TBA | Operation Fastlink † | Elliot |

Key
| † | Denotes films that have not yet been released |

== Awards ==
Major associations
| Year | Award | Category | Nominated work | Result | Ref. |
|---|---|---|---|---|---|
| 2020 | Critics' Choice Movie Awards | Best Young Performer | Jojo Rabbit | Won | |
| 2020 | Golden Globe Awards | Best Actor – Motion Picture Musical or Comedy | Jojo Rabbit | Nominated | |
| 2020 | Screen Actors Guild Awards | Outstanding Performance by a Cast in a Motion Picture | Jojo Rabbit | Nominated | |

Other associations
| Year | Award | Category | Nominated work | Result | Ref. |
|---|---|---|---|---|---|
| 2019 | Chicago Film Critics Association | Most Promising Performer | Jojo Rabbit | Nominated | |
| 2019 | Florida Film Critics Circle | Pauline Kael Breakout Award | Jojo Rabbit | Nominated | |
| 2019 | Hollywood Critics Association | Best Performance by an Actor or Actress 23 and Under | Jojo Rabbit | Nominated | |
| 2019 | Indiana Film Journalists Association | Breakout of the Year | Jojo Rabbit | Nominated | |
| 2019 | Las Vegas Film Critics Society | Youth in Film - Male | Jojo Rabbit | Nominated | |
| 2019 | North Texas Film Critics Association | Best Newcomer | Jojo Rabbit | Won | |
| 2019 | Online Association of Female Film Critics | Breakthrough Performance | Jojo Rabbit | Nominated | |
| 2019 | Phoenix Film Critics Society Awards | Breakthrough Performance | Jojo Rabbit | Won | |
| 2019 | Phoenix Film Critics Society Awards | Best Performance by a Youth | Jojo Rabbit | Won | |
| 2019 | San Diego Film Critics Society | Breakthrough Artist | Jojo Rabbit | Nominated | |
| 2019 | Seattle Film Critics Society | Best Youth Performance | Jojo Rabbit | Nominated | |
| 2019 | Washington D.C. Area Film Critics Association | Best Youth Performance | Jojo Rabbit | Won | |
| 2020 | Central Ohio Film Critics Association | Breakthrough Film Artist | Jojo Rabbit | Nominated | |
| 2020 | Dorian Awards | We're Wilde About You! Rising Star of the Year | Jojo Rabbit | Nominated | |
| 2020 | London Film Critics' Circle | Young British/Irish Performer of the Year | Jojo Rabbit | Nominated | |
| 2020 | Music City Film Critics' Association | Best Young Actor | Jojo Rabbit | Won | |
| 2021 | Saturn Awards | Best Performance by a Younger Actor in a Film | Jojo Rabbit | Nominated | |
