= Jojo Rabbit =

2019 film by Taika Waititi

- Theatrical release poster
- Directed by: Taika Waititi
- Screenplay by: Taika Waititi
- Based on: Caging Skies by Christine Leunens
- Produced by: Carthew Neal; Taika Waititi; Chelsea Winstanley
- Starring: Roman Griffin Davis; Thomasin McKenzie; Taika Waititi; Rebel Wilson; Stephen Merchant; Alfie Allen; Sam Rockwell; Scarlett Johansson
- Cinematography: Mihai Mălaimare Jr.
- Edited by: Tom Eagles
- Music by: Michael Giacchino
- Production companies: Fox Searchlight Pictures; Defender Films; Piki Films
- Distributed by: Fox Searchlight Pictures
- Release dates: September 8, 2019 (TIFF); October 18, 2019 (United States); October 24, 2019 (New Zealand)
- Running time: 108 minutes
- Countries: United States; Czech Republic; New Zealand
- Language: English
- Budget: $14 million
- Box office: $93.6 million

Jojo Rabbit is a 2019 satirical comedy-drama film written and directed by Taika Waititi, adapted from Christine Leunens' 2008 book Caging Skies. Roman Griffin Davis makes his film debut as the title character, Johannes "Jojo" Betzler, a ten-year-old Hitler Youth member who finds out that his mother (Scarlett Johansson) is hiding a Jewish girl (Thomasin McKenzie) in their attic. He must then question his beliefs while dealing with the intervention of his imaginary friend, a childlike, eccentric version of Adolf Hitler (played by Waititi) with a comedic stance on the politics of the war. The film also stars Sam Rockwell, Rebel Wilson, Stephen Merchant, and Alfie Allen.

Waititi wrote the screenplay in 2011, a year after his mother described the premise of Caging Skies. He rewrote the first draft, which as a rough adaptation of the dark-toned source material did not contain much comedy; it was also in the rewritten version that Adolf's character was included. Waititi recalled the pitching process as exhausting. In 2012, it landed on the Black List, where it remained in a development limbo until several years later when Fox Searchlight Pictures showed interest in it. A tight casting schedule started with principal photography in the Czech Republic in May 2018, finishing two months later. Post-production included adding the visual effects, editing done by Tom Eagles, as well as a score composed by Michael Giacchino.

Jojo Rabbit had its world premiere at the 44th Toronto International Film Festival on September 8, 2019, where it won the Grolsch People's Choice Award. It was later released theatrically in the United States on October 18. The film received positive reviews, though critics were divided on its comedic treatment of the subject of Nazism. It was chosen by the National Board of Review and the American Film Institute as one of the ten best films of the year. Among its numerous accolades, the film won the Academy Award for Best Adapted Screenplay, while also being nominated for five other awards, including Best Picture, at the 92nd Academy Awards.

== Plot ==
During the latter stages of World War II, in the fictional city of Falkenheim (Note: According to a bulletin seen in the film, the city's official name is Stadt Falkenheim, literally 'City of Falkenheim'.), Nazi Germany, ten-year-old Johannes "Jojo" Betzler joins the Deutsches Jungvolk. Heavily indoctrinated by Nazism, he has an imaginary friend named Adolf, a buffoonish version of Adolf Hitler.

The local HJ training camp is run by Captain Klenzendorf, who has grown disillusioned with Nazi politics. Though a fanatic, Jojo is deemed weak and nicknamed "Jojo Rabbit" after his conscience prevents him from killing a rabbit bare-handed. Pepped up by Adolf, he attempts to prove himself by throwing a Stielhandgranate during an exercise, only for it to explode at his feet, severely injuring him. Jojo's mother Rosie insists to the now-demoted Klenzendorf that Jojo still be included, by performing small tasks around town while he recuperates.

Alone at home one day, Jojo discovers Elsa Korr, a teenage Jewish girl and his late sister Inge's former friend, whom Rosie is hiding behind the walls of Inge's attic bedroom. He is both terrified of, and aggressive towards, Elsa. The two are left at an impasse, as Elsa's concealment means the death penalty for all three of them if discovered. Inspired by an offhand rant by Klenzendorf, Jojo continues to interact with Elsa to uncover her "Jew secrets" and make a picture book titled Yoohoo Jew, (Note: German: Yoohoo Jude) allowing people to easily recognise her kind. Elsa is both saddened and amused by Jojo's radical beliefs, using surreal antisemitic tropes to challenge his dogmatism. Jojo becomes infatuated with the strong-willed and kind teen, awkwardly forging love letters from her fiancé Nathan, and begins questioning his beliefs, causing Adolf to start acting more like the real Hitler and scold his diminishing nationalism.

Rosie is secretly part of the German resistance to Nazism, spreading anti-Nazi messages around town. (Note: The message reads "Befreit Deutschland – Bekämpft die Partei", which is translated to "Free Germany – Fight the Party".) The Gestapo come to investigate when she is away, and Klenzendorf helps deceive them about Elsa's identity. Later, Jojo finds Rosie has been hanged at the gallows in the public square, having been caught spreading the messages. Devastated, he tries to stab Elsa before breaking down in tears. She comforts him and reveals Jojo's lost father has been working against Hitler from abroad. Jojo's beliefs on Nazism quickly shift as he sees the regime's inhumanity. With no money, Jojo scavenges food for them both from waste bins around the city over the next few months.

Following the death of the real Hitler, Allied troops threaten to take Falkenheim by force. (Note: Identified off-screen as the Battle of Falkenheim.) The civilian population and Jungvolk are pressed into combat service. Jojo hides until the battle ends with an Allied victory. As a Jungvolk, Jojo is seized by the Soviet Red Army alongside Klenzendorf, who comforts him over the death of Rosie, tells him to look after Elsa, and tears off his Jungvolk coat while calling him a Jew so the Soviets do not harm him. Jojo escapes and runs home as Klenzendorf is executed by firing squad.

Fearing that Elsa will leave him, Jojo tells her Germany won the war, then forges a letter from Nathan claiming that he and Jojo know how to smuggle her to Paris. Elsa confesses that Nathan died of tuberculosis the previous year. Jojo tells Elsa he loves her and she replies she loves him as a brother. Adolf, now dishevelled and bearing a gunshot wound to the head, tries using Elsa's rejection of romance to lure Jojo back into Nazism, but the latter erases him by kicking him out of a window. Elsa sees American soldiers in the street outside and slaps Jojo for lying, but he accepts responsibility, and they dance to celebrate their freedom.

The film ends with a quote from a poem called "Go to the Limits of Your Longing" by Rainer Maria Rilke published in The Book of Hours

Let everything happen to you, beauty and terror. Just keep going. No feeling is final.

== Cast ==
- Roman Griffin Davis as Johannes "Jojo" Betzler, a 10-year-old German boy in the Deutsches Jungvolk
- Thomasin McKenzie as Elsa Korr, a 16-year-old Jewish girl whom Rosie hides in her home
- Taika Waititi as "Adolf Hitler", Jojo's imaginary friend who personifies his Nazi beliefs
- Rebel Wilson as Fräulein Rahm, an instructor of the League of German Girls in the Deutsches Jungvolk camp
- Stephen Merchant as Herman Deertz, a Gestapo agent
- Alfie Allen as Unteroffizier Freddy Finkel, the second-in-command to Captain Klenzendorf
- Sam Rockwell as Captain Klenzendorf, a German Army officer who runs a Deutsches Jungvolk camp
- Scarlett Johansson as Rosie Betzler, Jojo's mother who is secretly anti-Nazi
- Archie Yates as Yorki, Jojo's best friend and a fellow member of the Deutsches Jungvolk
- Luke Brandon Field as Deutsches Jungvolk senior Christoph
- Sam Haygarth as Deutsches Jungvolk senior Hans
- Stanislav Callas as a Russian soldier
- Gabriel Andrews as Herr Klum, Gestapo agent
- Joe Weintraub as Herr Junker, Gestapo agent
- Brian Caspe as Herr Mueller, Gestapo agent
- Billy Rayner as Herr Frosch, Gestapo agent
- Judith Georgi as German Translator
- Christian Holwings as Bazooka Boy
- Gilby and Hardy Griffin Davis as Hitler Youth doubles in the care of Fräulein Rahm
- Curtis Matthew as a Deutsches Jungvolk camp doctor
- Robert East as Herr Grusch, Gestapo Agent

== Production ==
=== Development and writing ===
I'[ve] seen film adaptations so faithful to the book that they somehow ended up unfaithful in essence, despite the well-meaning intentions. [A] book doesn't go directly from the book to the screen; it goes page to page. Taika's script had much to take from the book, yet it also had to escape it in order to come fully to life in its own medium. A reader spends a comparatively long time in there on his or her own, days or even weeks, in the dense chrysalis of prose, experiencing the emotions of the story while oblivious to the world.

— Leunens on Jojo Rabbit being an adaptation of Caging Skies

Waititi had the idea for Jojo Rabbit in 2010, when his mother, Robin Cohen, introduced him to Christine Leunens' 2008 novel Caging Skies. Bored with generic World War II stories that were told through the perspectives of soldiers and survivors, and aided by the background of his grandfather once fighting against the Nazis, he decided to adapt the novel. The taboo subject matter did not prevent him from pursuing the project: he looked at it as a motivation and thought of it as a challenge to be bold in filmmaking. He also considered the film a "love letter to all mothers", with a loving mother character present in the film. Waititi compared the premise of the screenplay with the Nickelodeon cartoon Rugrats, which portrays violence through the fantastical lens of a child: "In a lot of ways I wanted to keep some sort of innocence around that stuff." A juvenile lens also meant an honest depiction of Nazism for Waititi: "Children, they don't fuck around. They will straight-up say to you, 'You are ugly.' Or, 'You are a bad dad,' or 'you betrayed me.' Some of it makes no sense, but at least they're being honest about their feelings." Another inspiration came from reading that 66% of American millennials had never heard of or had no knowledge of the Auschwitz concentration camp; with Jojo Rabbit, he hoped the memories of the victims would remain forever and that conversations about the topic would not stop.

Shortly after Waititi had the idea for the adaptation, he sent an email to Leunens, and the screenplay was written in 2011. Waititi thought it was good timing, with various prejudices and extremism on the rise at the time. He insisted that slapstick was a fine way of telling a story with dark themes like World War II: "The world needs ridiculous films, because the world is ridiculous." The first draft did not contain Hitler, but Waititi rewrote the whole thing again shortly thereafter; the first draft lacked comedy, due to it being a rough adaptation from Caging Skies, which Waititi described as a complete drama. Waititi decided not to make Jojo Rabbit a "straight-out drama" as it would make the film cliché: he instead used humor to build the narrative, then introduced drama to shock the audience. Some of the characters' names were taken from Waititi's friends, he noted. Leunens described it as faithful to the source material, yet original, comparing it to the painting Guernica. Cohen praised the creation of Adolf and the cartoonish depiction of Nazis. Badlands (1973) was an inspiration for the relationship between Jojo and Elsa, while Alice Doesn't Live Here Anymore (1974) inspired Rosie's character. Colorized documentaries such as World War II in Colour (2008–2009) helped Waititi "to get a sense of how things really looked": colorful and vibrant. Regarding storyboards, Waititi instructed artist Andrej Kostic only if the scene had a number of actors; this includes the final battle scene.

The premise of the film meant difficulty in garnering interest from the film industry. Waititi stated that he did not do pitches: "I just sent the script out and let that do the talking. It's very hard to start a conversation with, 'It's about a little boy in the Hitler Youth.' [...] And then when I say, 'Oh, but don't worry, it's got humor in it,' it just gets worse." Nearly losing hope, he initially thought of just producing it independently in New Zealand. The project gained attention when it landed on the Black List of top unproduced screenplays in 2012. In February of that year at the International Film Festival Rotterdam, CineMart showed interest in the script. Despite this, the film remained in development limbo; Waititi went on with other projects like What We Do in the Shadows (2014) and Hunt for the Wilderpeople (2016). While Waititi's film Thor: Ragnarok (2017) began production, Fox Searchlight Pictures showed interest in Jojo Rabbit after searching for "more auteur-driven movies with challenging concepts." Contrary to popular belief that Ragnarok sparked interest in Waititi, Searchlight looked at his earlier works, such as Boy (2010). TSG Entertainment later joined the project with a budget of $14 million, $800,000 of which was directed towards the art department. In total, pre-production took two months.

Waititi initially wanted to film Jojo Rabbit in Berlin, a place with which he had a deep connection, with financing from Studio Babelsberg. However, due to human rights and filming restrictions in Germany, with minors only able to work three hours a day, he decided to move filming to the Czech Republic. Babelsberg was credited with assisting development alongside the New Zealand Film Commission. The Czech Film Fund was credited for giving the film's crew production incentives. Production services throughout filming were provided by Czech Anglo Productions. Waititi-affiliated Defender Films and Piki Films were also credited as production companies. The film was thus credited as a co-production between the United States, New Zealand, and the Czech Republic.

=== Casting ===
In 2018, casting associates were dispatched to schools in the United Kingdom, New Zealand, Germany, the United States, and Canada to find the right actor to portray Jojo Betzler. Waititi wanted an actor "who could embody the character's pinwheeling mix of blind gusto and untamed emotions in stride", while also depicting Jojo's coming-of-age transformation in a way that blended well with the film's "deep" themes. Waititi and the casting team, led by casting director Des Hamilton, watched about 1,000 audition tapes, and later accepted Roman Griffin Davis, who was initially being auditioned for Ford v Ferrari, but later also auditioned for Jojo Rabbit. According to producer Carthew Neal, Davis had the charisma and enthusiasm Jojo's character projects, but was also able to mix a variety of emotions, further enriching the film's "deep" themes. Davis stated that portraying Jojo was a challenge as he is a conflicted character. He guided himself by researching the Hitler Youth. As a newcomer, he received immense support from the cast members. Davis joined the project six weeks before filming; he was one of the latest actors to be cast despite being in the lead role.

Waititi created Elsa Korr as a character with "the steely strength and self-possession that defuses Jojo's distrust", a mysterious yet humane outlook. Thomasin McKenzie, a New Zealand actress Waititi had known for a long time, was chosen to portray Elsa as a "really pretty, very cool girl who has this hard attitude", which hopefully would make Jojo's infatuation towards her in the film understandable. McKenzie did research on World War II from the perspective of a Jewish girl, and she created the character of Elsa by herself, with Waititi giving her only a teaser of how he imagined Elsa. Waititi also asked her to watch the film Heathers (1988), which has a character he envisioned Elsa to be.

In March 2018, it was revealed that Waititi would direct, write, co-produce, and co-star in the film as Adolf. Speaking of the context of the role, Waititi stated, "It's my version of [...] a lonely boy's best version of his hero, which is really his dad," referring to the fact that in the film, Jojo is desperate to join Hitler's ranks during World War II. Searchlight decided that they would only make the film if Waititi portrayed Adolf; Waititi reluctantly agreed and recalled being embarrassed on set. He also stated he did not do much research on Hitler "because I just didn't think he deserved [the effort]." The cast members recalled being shocked the first time they saw Waititi dressed as Adolf.

Also in March, Scarlett Johansson was cast as Rosie for what Waititi described as "this sort of goofy quality about her that I always really wanted to see in a film". Although the film's premise was new to her, Johansson stated that she immediately fell in love with the character. and said that the screenplay "has a lot of humanity." The following month, Sam Rockwell was cast as Captain Klenzendorf. He was "reticent" at the time, like most of the other actors, but he chose to join the project because he said the role "has a juxtaposition", specifically pointing at the Klenzendorf's homosexuality, which according to him is an oxymoron. Rockwell looked for inspiration from comedians like Bill Murray and Walter Matthau (from the 1976 film The Bad News Bears), as he felt they resembled his assigned character. He also looked to the film's other characters for inspiration.

In June 2018, Alfie Allen was cast as Klenzendorf's companion Freddy Finkel. Though Finkel was a new and risky role for Allen, the familial dynamic of the set made it easier for him. The same month, Stephen Merchant was cast as Captain Herman Deertz. He said that he became interested in the film due to its coming-of-age nature, and thought that Waititi's blend of humor and tragedy was seamless, comparing its satirical style with that of Dr. Strangelove. Soon, Rebel Wilson joined the project as Fräulein Rahm.

Casting in Prague was led by Maya Kvetny, with Kristýna Poliček assisting. Additional casting was done by Shayna Markowitz, Stephanie Gorin, and Stu Turner. Casting for the extras were done by Deedee Casting Management; children extras were cast by A-Casting.

=== Filming ===
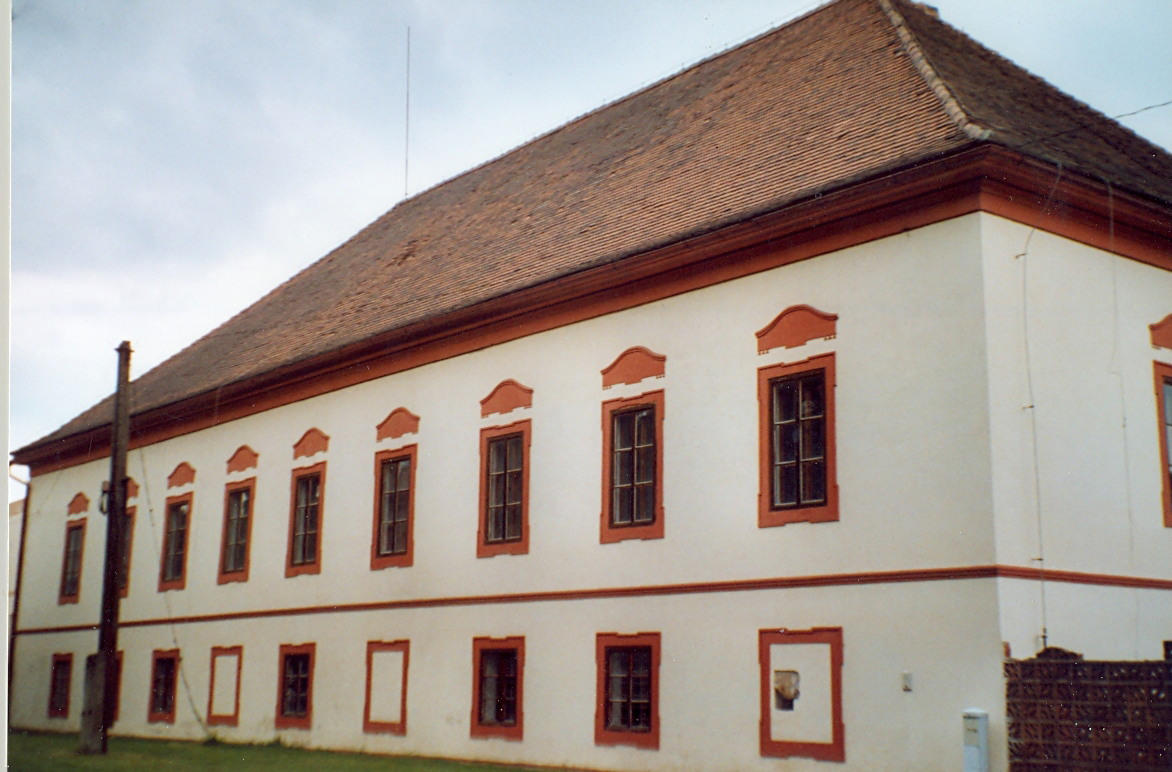

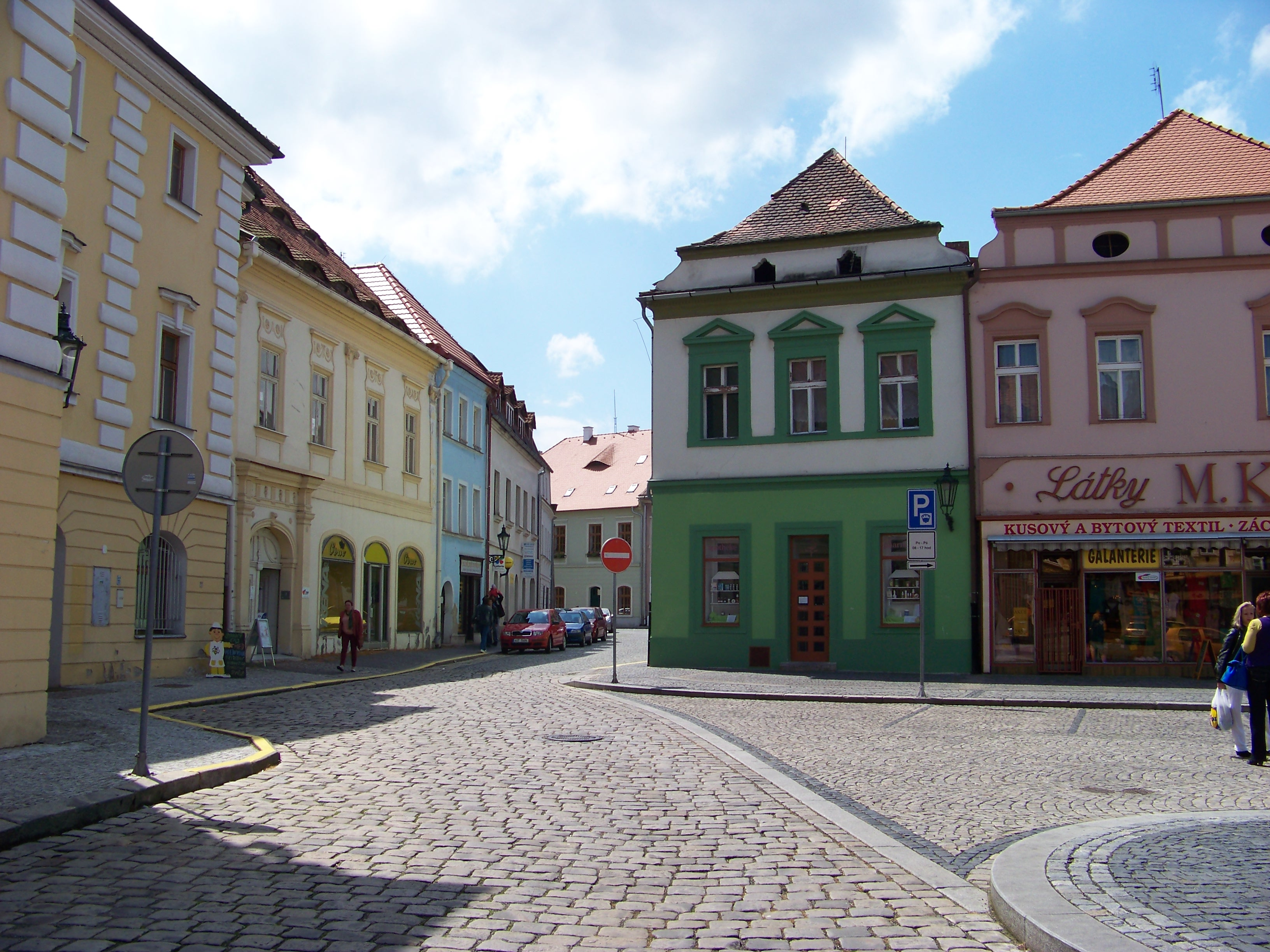
Lenešice sugar factory (top) and Náměstí Svobody in Žatec (bottom), two of the filming locations in Jojo Rabbit

Principal photography for Jojo Rabbit occurred between May 28 and July 21, 2018, at various places in Prague, Žatec, Úštěk, Kytín, Dolní Beřkovice, Hořín, Lenešice, and the Petschek Palace. The former Lenešice sugar refinery was used to film the war scenes. Production designer Ra Vincent chose these pre-war, unbombed places "because it had so much character and it felt like the most German of all the Czech towns we visited, with lots of German-style baroque architecture". Barrandov Studios were also used for filming most of the interior scenes, which Vincent thought of as a great choice, considering Nazi propaganda used to be filmed there. Vincent chose Úštěk to film the exterior due to the "ornate" color palette of the architecture, said to connect with Jojo's character.

Waititi prohibited cell phone usage on set in order to retain focus and create a calming environment. He allowed the crew and actors to experiment with their work or characters by themselves, as he had no strict edicts for how the film should unfold. This was also stated to be a third reason for the cell phone prohibition. Other directors, including Quentin Tarantino, have used this rule before. By minimizing directions for the cast members, Waititi hoped to avoid stiff performances. He also did not show the full picture of Rosie when she was hanged, thinking it was unethical to showcase the deaths of family members.

Due to labor laws on child actors, the crew was only able to film eight or nine hours a day, causing stress for the adult actors as they would have to work with body doubles for certain periods of time. The actors described having a fun experience on set, saying Waititi was engaging to work with. McKenzie further elaborated that it was "easy-going and fun", as it allowed her to "explore the character and try different things". These, along with doing rehearsals, were part of an effort to make the child actors feel comfortable so they would act more naturally.

Reshoots were done starting in February 2019. They mainly focused on scenes set during winter.

=== Cinematography and visual effects ===
The pavement and buildings further away were in reality blue screens. Jojo Rabbit was shot in a 1.85:1 aspect ratio, as there are many scenes with two people indoors. A lively color palette is used to symbolize Jojo's amusement towards the Nazi regime.

Mihai Mălaimare Jr. was enlisted as the film's cinematographer while he was doing reshoots for The Hate U Give in Atlanta, and he joined the project five days later. He agreed to depict Jojo Rabbit in a colorful and vibrant way, a primary motif of the film, taking inspiration from several colorized documentaries. He also took inspiration from a film he had previously worked on, Youth Without Youth (2007), which featured colorful World War II footage, contrasting the typical desaturated and grayscale historical footage. Cabaret (1972) was also a visual reference used for the cinematography. Despite this, Mălaimare arranged for the melancholic scenes to look more desaturated, corresponding to Jojo's emotions and showing the passage of time. He and Waititi also agreed not to visually exaggerate scenes with Adolf. Henri Cartier-Bresson and Robert Capa's images of children during World War II also served as inspiration for the cinematography style: "They were still playing, and they were still doing normal kid stuff, [but] the closer you look at the photo, [...] you realize something is wrong—like, 'Oh, in this one, they are wearing gas masks,' or 'They are playing close to a pile of bomb'—all these situations that we felt were very close to [Jojo Rabbit]." Around 60 similar stills from Magnum Photos and Flickr were also printed to be analyzed for inspiration.

Mălaimare and Waititi also agreed on the decision not to use hand-held cameras, in order to retain the film's classical style. Equipped with a dolly (a golf cart for scenes in the forest), an Arri Alexa SXT and Mini with Super 35 format was used. Around five tests were implemented to determine the aspect ratio for the film; a 1.85:1 anamorphic format was chosen, considering that there were lots of scenes with two people indoors. The anamorphic format was favored due to its "velvety" tone, focus breathing, as well as authentic bokeh. Lenses include the Hawk V-Lite 1.3x anamorphic, Vantage One T1 spherical, and Leitz Summilux-C. The stopped down T1 was used for scenes in small or low-light areas, in order to give them a wide feel. Mălaimare worked with digital imaging technician (DIT) Eli Berg to seamlessly transition between scenes using different lenses. Though point-of-view shots were used, the main approach in making the film first-person on Jojo is to lower the camera to Davis's height. Waititi also allowed the actors to also give cinematographic advice, some of which were better than Waititi's suggestions, per Mălaimare. Symmetry and horizons are the main composition approaches to the cinematography, a major contributor to the narrative flow. The film was mostly shot using a multiple-camera setup so that close-up and wide shots could be done simultaneously. These camerawork techniques were used as a way to show Jojo's emotions and what he was feeling throughout the entirety of Jojo Rabbit. In the Mirror scene, for example, the camera, in this instance acts as a powerful tool, peeling back the surface of Jojo's outward display to expose the underlying vulnerability and the insidious grip of indoctrination. Exterior scenes rarely used artificial lighting: scenes in the forest, for example, solely used the sun. The interplay of light and shadow in the forest is crucial for conveying mood. Scenes where Jojo is fearful or uncertain might feature more prominent shadows, creating a sense of unease or the unknown. Conversely, moments of budding connection or understanding might be bathed in softer, more even light. The final sequence of the battle scene, which took five or six takes to accomplish, used three extra lights, but they were merely supplements to the sun. The scene where Jojo is having dinner with Rosie used an extensive lighting kit, mainly consisting of a chandelier and two practical lights, lighting the entirety of the setting; one of them dimmed, and tungsten lights to give the characters a softer and warmer lighting in the close-up shots. Small five-watt LED lights were used as lighting for the actors in scenes at Elsa's secret room. In that setting, Mălaimare decided to use a medium-bright petrol lamp as the key light, whereas a lighting was used to indicate dusk; candles act as supplements.

Visual effects supervisor Jason Chen had previously worked with Waititi. He joined the project after working on Bumblebee. The goal was to create a "seamless illusion", balancing realism and surrealism. In total, there were about 200 visual effects shots, "about half of which were big invisible set extensions and often done by a [...] team of in house compositors" led by previous Chen collaborator Kenneth Quinn Brown. Chen worked with Clear Angle Studios to set up 3D scanners on tripods at Žatec. The scanners shoot laser beams, rotating 360 degrees, scanning the surrounding architecture in order to give an accurate representation of them. They also scanned Czech streets with historical relevance to Jojo Rabbit, especially the square used for Jojo's town, which was once a frequent place for Hitler to hold rallies. A major contributor to the visual effects was Luma Pictures, which split work between Los Angeles and Melbourne. Luma used blue screens to incorporate elements like explosions, tanks, smoke, and gunfire in post-production. The glow of bombs going off in the distance, meanwhile, used matte paintings. They also incorporated snow into scenes that were actually shot during the summer, but were supposed to depict winter in Jojo Rabbit's universe. This was achievable by photographing snow on the streets and adding it to the film, a technique known as "background plate." Additional effects were done by Picture Shop VFX. In total, visual effects took a year to finish.

=== Fashion design ===
Mayes C. Rubeo, who had previously collaborated with Waititi in Ragnarok, became Jojo Rabbit's costume designer. In an "intensive" conversation about the costumes, Waititi favored "formal, elegant" fashion, as it matched the kind of clothing people wore in that era, according to his research. He also wanted a design that symbolized the joy of childhood: bright, vivid colors, stressing the ambition to contrast typical historical films. Rubeo interpreted these as Italian neorealism, a filmmaking style popular in the 1940s.

Rubeo thought of Rosie's character as open: "She represents [...] life, [and] she doesn't want to hide [that]." Rubeo started by scouring vintage Italian houses for Rosie's wardrobe, though she also created several blouses and dresses by herself. She wanted Rosie's clothing to be distinctive so it would resonate with the audience throughout the film and assist them in the scene where Rosie is found hanged. Concerning that specific scene, Rubeo chose a pair of single lace-up red and white spectator shoes made by the Toronto shoemaker Jitterbug, based on a sketch she made. Imagining Rosie as "the friend of Elsa Schiaparelli", Rubeo flew to New York City, where she discussed the costume with actor Johansson. Rosie's short-sleeved sweater was characterized by "plaid and zigzag Missoni-style patterns". She was completed with high-waist baggy pants and several other accessories, offering her character a "chic" look. This is in stark contrast to Elsa's clothing palette which, being a confined character, was made monochromatic.

Jojo's Jungvolk uniform was based on the assumption that he is "trying to be the policeman of his household", especially when he wears it even in his house. Though Rubeo found vintage Jungvolk uniforms in Berlin, she noted the need for more sizes for the extras, causing her and the clothing department to sew them, a total of 250, themselves. For Adolf, Rubeo chose the typical brown Nazi Party style, in order to highlight the absurdities of his character, though a "voluminous" pair of riding pants was used to highlight his imaginary state and insecurities. The Hollywood Reporter described it as "paper-bag colored", "khaki", and "safari-style". In total, three Adolf uniforms were sewn. Portraying Captain Klenzendorf, Rockwell reached out to Rubeo and showed her a photo of Murray on Saturday Night Live, saying that he wanted such design. For an experimental uniform Klenzendorf was written to wear in the screenplay, Rubeo went for a "glitzier", "heroic", and "flamboyant" approach, creating for him an "unorthodox" outfit, showcasing the character's creativity despite "know[ing] almost nothing about the rules of design." She said that creating Klenzendorf's outfit "was fun to do".

Rubeo made six different versions for a paper uniform Yorki wears in the final battle scene. She made it out of paper and cardboard, with some cotton. As the war ensues, Yorki's uniform degrades, with only a vest left as the war concludes.

The film's make-up artist was Danelle Satherley, also a frequent collaborator of Waititi's. On Adolf's looks, she envisioned them to be those of a 10-year-old imagination and not an exact replica of Hitler's looks. Despite this, they had some similarities for familiarity purposes. The hair, mustache, and ears shared similarities with Hitler's, whereas the skin and eyes had some alterations. Waititi's skin, specifically, was toned down a bit to not make his character look Caucasian. Blue eyes were chosen to match the propaganda Jojo saw.

=== Production design ===
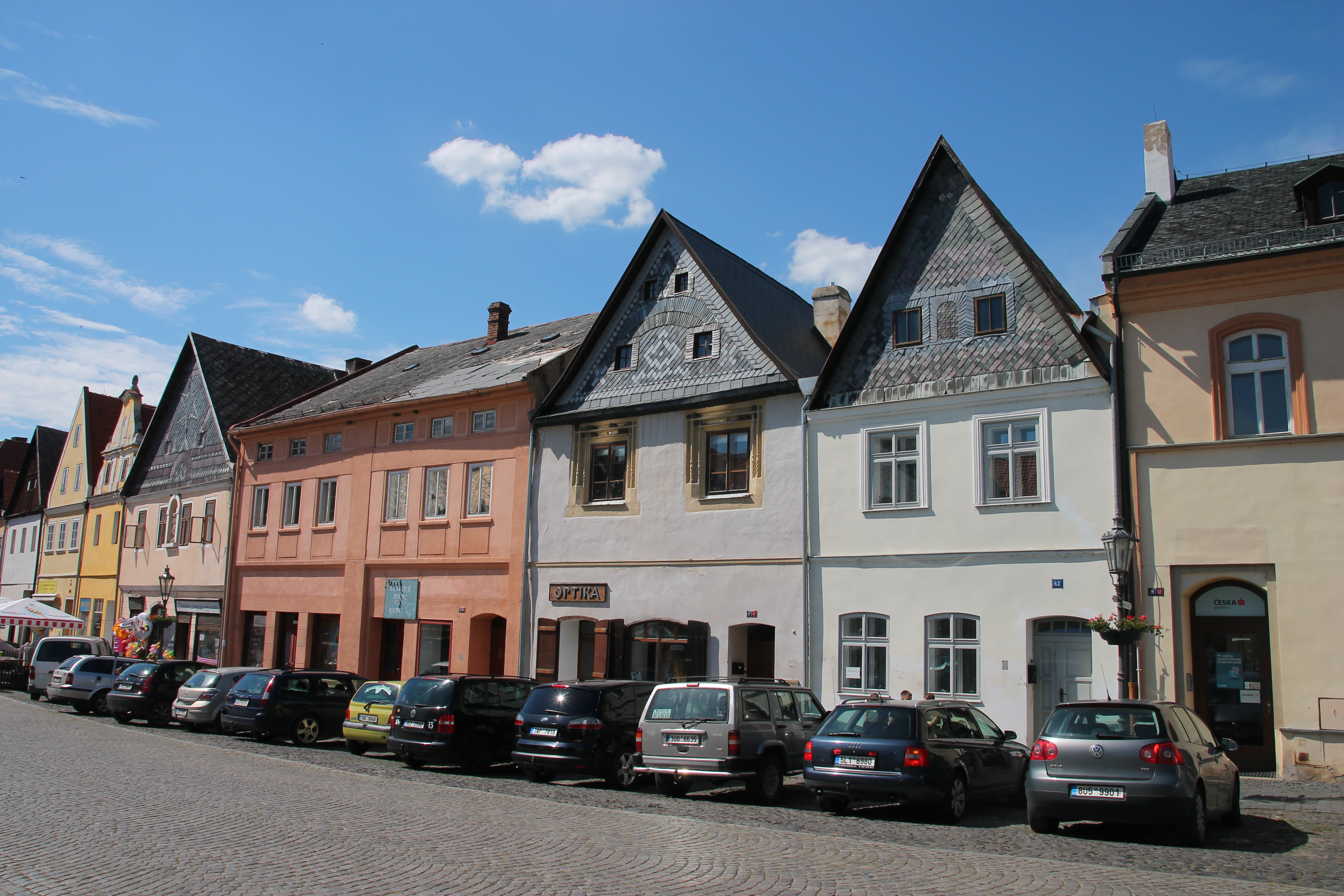
A row of houses in Úštěk that was used in the film

Vincent, who lived in New Zealand, was flabbergasted to be offered the role of the film's production designer, but he had read the script when it was still unproduced and already had some ideas for the set design. He stayed in the Czech Republic for some time to get a feel for European architecture, and took to locals who told generational stories about World War II in order to depict wartime Europe authentically, while giving aesthetic touches to symbolize the joy Jojo's character feels about Nazi Germany. Vincent recalled that the interaction with locals was easier than one might think because they see their Nazi history as something it is important to remember, not cover up. He also said that he thinks the locals might have even felt sad when the set decorations were torn away, since his team had "transformed the village back into its former glory days, when it was a beautifully unsullied town." Mălaimare commented that the practice in the Czech Republic of being very cautious about installing air conditioners and antennas on historical buildings – things that would have ruined the historical look of the film – allowed for a 360-degree set without having to remove much other than cars and street signs. Helping the research were military advisors and specialists; Filip Stiebitz was officially credited as one.

The fully handcrafted set design for the Betzlers' house, a Baroque stone cottage filmed at a 7,000 square feet (650 m^{2}) Barrandov Studios soundstage, is characterized by elegant details, such as thick door frames, windows recessed deeply into the stone walls, a wood-paneled hallway, and a curved staircase. Broadly, it features Art Deco architecture popular in the 1930s. Victorian architecture and a muted color palette were used for Inge's bedroom in order to provide a neutral space in which Jojo and Elsa could bond. According to Vincent's research, Inge's bedroom being in the attic is historically accurate, because certain families in World War II had new types of insulation replacing the method of pitched roofs, meaning they could build rooms up to the attic. This makes Elsa's hideout "obvious, but not-so-obvious". It is conceptualized that the Betzlers are a middle-class family, wealthy enough to own a two-floored, three-bedroom house. With a more modernized interior, another notion is also formed that the house was at some point renovated. Creating the house was said to be the trickiest thing throughout the film's production design. To not make it claustrophobic, the house was given an open layout plan, "and one with viewing portals through to other spaces so that you never felt like you were going to individual little sets. We wanted you to feel you were journeying through a proper house." The house was built on a stage to allow for adequate space to film using a multi-camera setup.

According to Vincent, a woman named Cheng Liang, who was the film's art department assistant, drew Yoohoo Jew. She took inspiration from some of the artwork from the screenplay, as well as Waititi and Vincent's descriptions. Though the book was planned to be about 12 pages long, Liang ended up drawing 42 pages. Her drawings also became inspirations for the cast's acting style, according to Vincent.

=== Editing ===
This dialogue of Adolf scolding Jojo in Adolf's penultimate speaking scene has reverb added (starting with "wolf!") to evoke a sense of rallying and tension as it closely mimics the real Hitler's speeches.

Editor Tom Eagles said that Waititi had been talking to him about the project "for a long time", though he read the screenplay much later. He recalled that Waititi did not sit by his side to judge his editing while it was ongoing. "He's interested in what you have to say and what you might bring to the edit," Eagles said. Eagles was given two weeks to edit Jojo Rabbit after being given some initial suggestions, which Eagles "cautiously" implemented. The film was edited using Avid Media Composer. Eagles used ScriptSync to compare scenes with the screenplay. He stated that the main challenge in editing the film was to give it a tonal balance for every transition between scenes: The rough cut was 165 minutes, with the director's cut being the finalized, 108-minute version. Eagles said that "We didn't want it to look like Titanic". Trimming took eight months, with test screenings implemented: "We needed to test different versions of things and iterations of jokes." It was also observed that some audiences were shocked by a scene when Hitler is scolding Jojo over his degrading patriotism; one person began quietly reciting a prayer. Dailies were also screened to the entire film team once or twice a week in a "small" screening room to let everyone judge the film's qualities, something said to be rare in modern filmmaking.

The film's title sequence was created by the New Zealand production company Assembly. It features footage from the 1935 Nazi propaganda documentary Triumph of the Will. The text letterforms were handcrafted to correspond to the film's historical aesthetic. The film's end titles were created by Scarlet Letters.

Ai-Ling Lee was the film's sound editor, designer, and mixer. With the digital audio workstation (DAW) Pro Tools, she used "subliminal sonic enhancements" to strengthen the sense that the film was portraying Jojo's point of view. In an interview with Variety, she referenced a scene in Jojo's kitchen where Waititi wanted to evoke the sound of Adolf rallying to reflect the character acting progressively more like the real Hitler. To increase the tension in the scene, she added reverb to Adolf's dialogue as if he were speaking in front of a microphone to a large crowd. Accompanying Lee as sound editor was Tobias Poppe. Paul Apelgren was the film's music editor. Steve Baine of Foley One was the Foley artist, with Peter Persaud and Gina Wark mixing and assisting with the Foley, respectively. Bob Industries was credited for post-production services.

Digital intermediate work, specifically color grading, was done by Company 3's senior colorist Tim Stipan.

=== Music ===
"Jojo's Theme"
The theme music of Jojo Rabbit, which depending on the film's mood comes in different tones, from joyful to depressing. This clip—part of the longer, ambivalent "Jojo's Theme", which was the end titles' music—represents the latter.

Jojo Rabbit's original score is composed by Michael Giacchino, in his maiden collaboration with Waititi. Giacchino used the approach of a melodious fairy-tale like score, evoking themes of love and losses after Waititi insisted to score similarly to what he did in Up, Giacchino pledged to use music to emphasize the film's deep emotions instead of its humor, in order to retain the film's message, and to try to musicalize Nazi Germany from Jojo's perspective, who recalled this being a challenge. The score was recorded in December 2018 at the Abbey Road Studios, London, with the choir portions for the 11-minute suite (which was the film's theme music), composed by Giacchino, was the first to be recorded. Caludia Vašeková coordinated the choir, while the vocals, done by Trinity Boys Choir, were contracted by Susie Gillis for Isobel Griffiths Ltd. Freddie Jemison, part of Trinity Boys, was the vocal soloist in another version of the suite and adult vocalists were from London Voices.

Apart from contemporary German music, the score consisted of old-time European classical music, such as that of Frédéric Chopin, Franz Liszt, and Erik Satie. Instead of a 100-piece orchestra, the score was composed with a 22-piece orchestra, featuring string quartet and various instruments including guitar, brass and percussion, as according to Giacchino, "the smaller the orchestra, the more emotional the sound."

Incorporated music in the film was packaged as a soundtrack album, notably "'Helden'", the German version of "'Heroes'" by David Bowie, and "Komm, gib mir deine Hand", the German version of "I Want to Hold Your Hand" by the Beatles. While watching documentaries on the Hitler Youth during research, Waititi noted "similarities between the crowd at Hitler's rallies and the frenzy at Beatles concerts". Giacchino helped secure the rights to the song by contacting Paul McCartney, with whom he had previously worked. Both this soundtrack and the original score soundtrack were released on October 18, 2019, the day of Jojo Rabbit's theatrical release, by Hollywood Records, Fox Music, and Universal Music Canada, with the vinyl version of the soundtrack released on November 22.

== Themes and analysis ==
Waititi described the moral of Jojo Rabbit as "about learning to think for yourself and not falling into the trap of just following the group".

A dominant theme within this film is Nazism. According to GradeSaver, a study guide, the film uses humor to reveal the stakes of the regime's impact on the characters and their freedom. Specifically in Jojo, whose loyalty towards Nazism shifts throughout the film due to a clash with innocence, the film also shows the dangers of propaganda to those who blindly abide by it, especially children. The film also focuses on the individual characters and their traits, highlighting their bravery and strength to show "how strong they were even in the face of horror"; this is most distinct in Elsa's character, who has been compared to Anne Frank. Thus, the film centers around the concept of how ideologies can affect people and society. It is also a message that fascist groups, such as the Nazis, are harmful to everyone, supporters and opposition. It also sends a message that war takes joy away from people and is "painstakingly ugly"; the Annals of the Romanian Society for Cell Biology described it as "a moral to the present uncertainties in the modern world."

Hegemonic and toxic masculinity are also themes expressed in Jojo Rabbit. The main example lies in Jojo's desire to be a Nazi, which to do so he was taught to act fierce. It also shows how such mentality harms everyone, men and women. Jojo's clumsy attitude as seen throughout the film shows how he is inherently incompatible with the ideology. This also allows the other characters as well as the audiences who "eventually overlook his avowed Nazism and instead view him as a sympathetic, misguided character who should be allowed redemption." Adolf's buffoonish attitude is a way of showcasing how hegemonic masculinity can attack itself subversively. There's also the suggestion that "Komm, gib mir deine Hand" is used to compare the obsessive behavior of the Beatles' fans (Beatlemania) to that of the prejudicial behavior of the Nazis.

Irony runs throughout the film. In the opening scene, Jojo motivates himself to be "a man," yet is nervous. According to Tony S.L. Michael of the Journal of Religion and Film, the way Falkenheim literature is German but the character dialogues are mostly English "sets up the dichotomy between the fact that what is outside may separate us, but what is inside should bring us altogether." This leads to another suggested theme of the film: human interaction. For example, as Elsa and Rosie began stressing to Jojo the importance of love and compassion in various dialogues, his viewpoint of Nazism begin to subtly shift, shown by the darkening attitude of Adolf. Klenzendorf's character, meanwhile, most embodies the film's use of hyperbole and sarcasm—seen in his distinct use of dry humor—which makes him important to the over-the-top portrayals of Nazism.

A main motif of Jojo Rabbit is shoes. They feature frequently in the film, either visually or audibly. According to Michael, it is a metaphor symbolizing Jojo's coming-of-age journey. During the scene where Jojo finds Rosie hanged, it suggests to Jojo that he should become more mature. Other motifs include the rabbit, symbolizing Jojo's inability to live up to the Nazis' expectations, and the dagger, symbolizing toxic masculinity. Meanwhile, dancing represents "pleasure in the face of adversity, relief when it is over, and hope for the future", as well as freedom. Nulman compares this to the misquoted phrase by Emma Goldman, "If I can't dance, it's not my revolution."

== Marketing and release ==
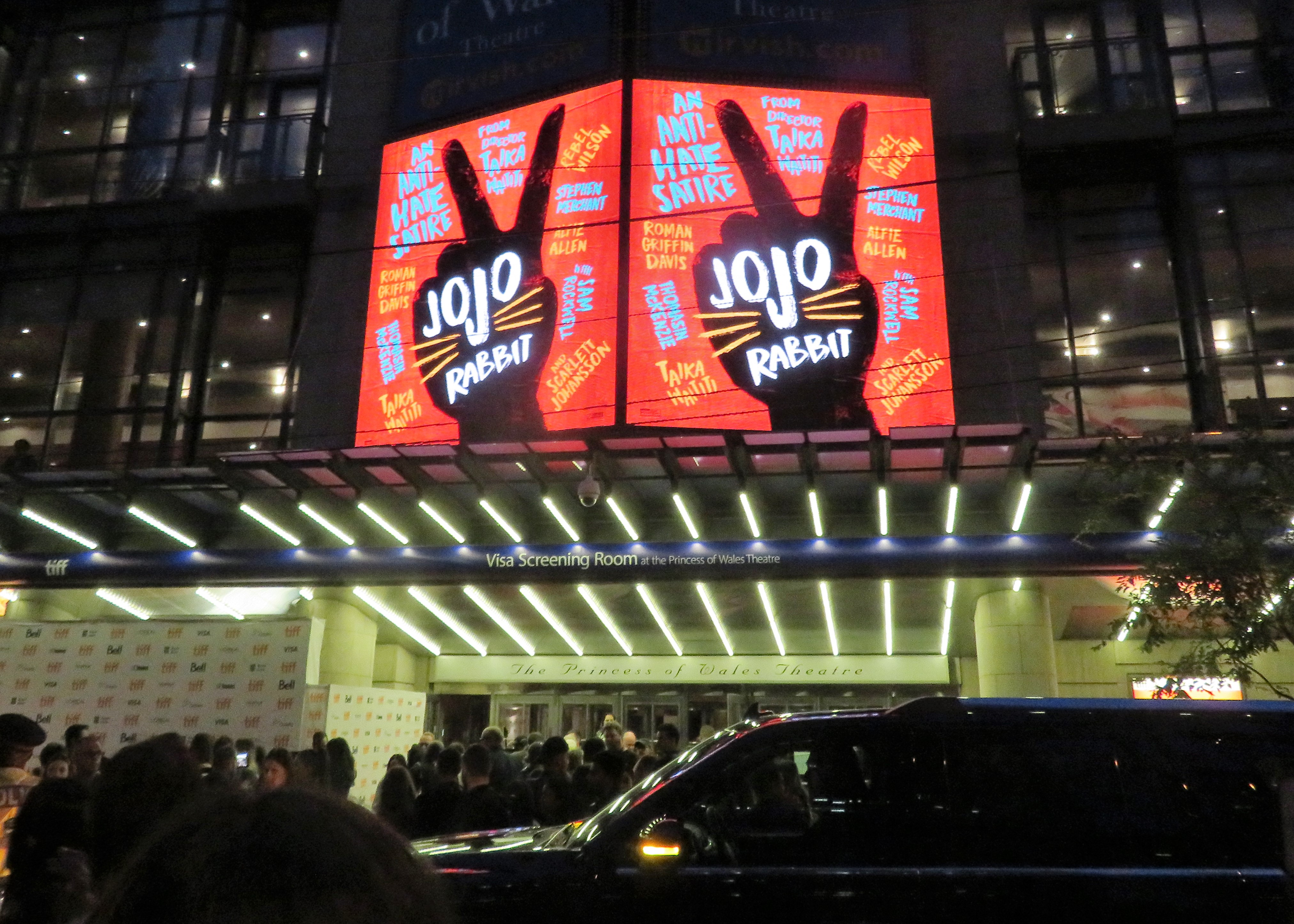
Premiere of the film at the 44th Toronto International Film Festival

In March 2019, Disney completed its acquisition of distributor Fox Searchlight's parent company 21st Century Fox. As Jojo Rabbit featured mature themes, several Disney executives worried that releasing the film would ruin their reputation as a family-friendly studio; it was also said to be "too edgy" for Disney, as stated in Variety. However, they remained optimistic about the film's success, with CEOs Bob Iger and Alan Horn arguing that it has a good message and would diversify their scope.

To market the film, Fox Searchlight released a scene from the German World War II film Downfall, which had been a popular asset for memes, wherein subtitles would mistranslate the dialogue to something humorous, mostly known as the Angry Hitler meme. In the Jojo Rabbit version, Hitler is driven insane with the news of Waititi, a Polynesian Jew, creating a film poking fun at Hitler. Additionally, a teaser was released on July 24, 2019, and a trailer was released on September 3, 2019. Smith Brothers Media was in charge of making visual advertisements, including posters and web banners, primarily for Australia. Due to the film's quirky nature, a "vibrant" theme was chosen to "make the character images 'pop' for potential audiences." The poster was unveiled on September 5.

Jojo Rabbit had its world premiere at the 44th Toronto International Film Festival on September 8, 2019. It also screened at festivals at Austin, San Diego, Chicago, Philadelphia, Hawaii, New Orleans, Chapel Hill, Middleburg, Tokyo, and the United Kingdom. It was also the closing film for the 30th Stockholm International Film Festival on November 16, 2019, which was also the film's Nordic premiere. The film was theatrically released in the United States on October 18, 2019, opening in several cities before expanding in the following weeks. By November 8, 2019, it was playing in 798 theaters in the U.S. Jojo Rabbit was released in New Zealand on October 24, 2019. In other countries, it was released within the vicinity of January and February 2020. In the United States, it remained in theaters for around 70 weeks and was last screened on March 19, 2020. A scheduled theatrical release of Jojo Rabbit in China of February 12, 2020 was confirmed, following restrictions due to the COVID-19 pandemic, to be postponed, alongside various other films by the National Arthouse Alliance of Cinemas (the film's distributor). It later saw a limited release from July 31 to August 27, 2020.

20th Century Fox Home Entertainment released the film as a digital download on February 4, 2020, and on DVD and Blu-ray disc formats in the United States on February 18. In international territories, the film was released on DVD and Blu-ray by Walt Disney Studios Home Entertainment. The Blu-ray release contains several special features, including three deleted scenes ("Imaginary Göring", (Note: In this scene, Adolf, aware of his imaginary status, shows Jojo an imaginary Hermann Göring who used to be a child's imaginary friend and has shivered constantly since the child stopped believing in him, so Jojo can see what happens when an imaginary friend is neglected.) "Little Piggies", (Note: In this scene, Jojo asks Adolf if he thinks he is ugly. Adolf says that he is ugly, but not useless, remembering Erwin Rommel, a "hideous" man who was his frequent, favorite massager.) "Adolf Dies Again" (Note: In this alternate scene, Jojo confronts Adolf for lying to everyone, feeling betrayed, and expresses disbelief in him. Adolf scoffs at the anger before suffering a seizure.)), outtakes, a featurette titled "Inside Jojo Rabbit", an audio commentary, and two of the film's trailers. The film was later released on Hotstar, HBO Max, Sky Cinema, Now TV, and Hulu. It was also released on Disney+'s Star sub-brand on February 23, 2021.

== Reception ==
=== Box office ===
During its original theatrical run, Jojo Rabbit grossed $33.4 million in the United States and Canada, and $57 million in other territories (including $4 million in New Zealand), for a worldwide total of $90.3 million. A 2023 re-release in New Zealand brought its total box office gross up to $93.6 million.

In its domestic limited opening weekend, the film made $349,555 from five theaters, an average of $69,911 per venue (the fourth-best of 2019). On its opening day alone it earned an average of $70,000, The film expanded to 55 theaters in 10 cities the following week, making $1 million, and in its third weekend it grossed $2.3 million from 256 theaters. It went wide the following weekend, making $4 million from 802 theaters. The film's theater count peaked the fifth weekend of its release, making $2.8 million from 995 theaters, before making $1.6 million in its sixth weekend. Viewership expansions were credited to Christmas and the attention it began to receive among the accolades community, surpassing $20 million as of December 19, 2019, its tenth week, at which point it was showing in 230 theaters.

In the immediate aftermath of its Academy Award for Best Picture nomination, the film experienced a box office boost, with 895 more theaters screening it. On January 19, 2020, it was being screened at 1,005 American theaters, "the largest expansion of any Oscar contender" according to TheWrap. During the weekend, it earned $1.8 million, bringing its total to $23.8 million. Over the Oscar weekend, the film's 17th week of release, it made $1.5 million from 1,096 theaters, for a running total of $30.3 million. Demand dropped during the rise of the COVID-19 pandemic by as much as 68%, with its rank at the box office dropping from 21 to 32 between February 21, 2020, and its closing date. Its peak period was November 8–14, its fourth weekend, when it earned $5,603,616 (average: $7,022) from 798 theaters, experiencing a 70.3% increase in demand and ranking 11th place at the U.S. box office.

On February 23, 2020, its third week of release on home video, 14,277 DVD copies were sold ($208,046) and 47,036 Blu-ray copies were sold, making a total profit of $1,365,588. The latter type saw fewer purchases the following month.

Outside of the United States and Canada, Jojo Rabbit did the best in the United Kingdom, where it grossed $10,450,169, followed by Australia ($7,020,681) and Mexico ($4,952,293), as well as Italy, New Zealand, Japan, Spain, France, Germany, and the Netherlands. It performed the worst in Bulgaria, where it earned a total of $39,181 as of March 11, 2020. In India, the film opened earning ₹ 1.2-1.5 million on the first day, ₹6 million in the first 3 days, and closed after 28 days with a total of ₹34.3 million. As of July 15, 2020, the film had earned $36,000 (€30,614) in Italy from 37 theaters with a total of $4.4 million (€3,741,719), earning first place at the box office. In China, where it was released the latest, it earned more: a total of $1,590,000 from 7,099 theaters, with an opening weekend gross of $730,000.

=== Critical response ===
Metacritic review
breakdown (unweighted)

Positive
30 (53%)
Mixed
20 (35%)
Negative
7 (12%)

The review aggregator website Rotten Tomatoes reported an approval rating of 80% with an average score of 7.6/10, based on 430 reviews. The website's critical consensus reads, "Jojo Rabbit's blend of irreverent humor and serious ideas definitely won't be to everyone's taste—but either way, this anti-hate satire is audacious to a fault." Metacritic, which uses a weighted average, assigned the film a score of 58 out of 100 based on 57 critics, indicating "mixed or average" reviews. Audiences polled by CinemaScore gave the film an average grade of "A" on an A+ to F scale, and those at PostTrak gave the film a 96% overall positive score, with 87% saying they would definitely recommend it.

Brian Truitt, writing for USA Today called it "brilliant Nazi-mocking satire", praising the performances, and writing: "As much as it makes you laugh, Waititi's must-watch effort is a warm hug of a movie that just so happens to have a lot of important things to say." In a positive review, Steve Pond of TheWrap wrote that "there's real heart in Jojo Rabbit, too. This is a dark satire that finds a way to make a case for understanding. As circumstances slowly chip away at Jojo's hate-driven worldview, the black comedy finds room for some genuinely touching moments."

Richard Roeper of the Chicago Sun-Times lauded it as "uncomfortably funny, unapologetically insensitive, cheerfully outrageous" and concluding that writer-director Waititi "delivers a timely, anti-hate fractured fairy tale." In another positive review, Stephanie Zacharek of Time wrote: "It's Waititi's ability to balance unassailable goofy moments with an acknowledgment of real-life horrors that makes the movie exceptional." Adam Graham of The Detroit News called it an "enchanting, whimsical satire about the absurdity of war as seen through a child's eyes" as well as "a smart, accessible, inclusive film that opens doors at a time when many are slamming them shut." Benjamin Franz of Film & History praised the film for its use of symmetrical cinematography and exaggerated German accents, equivalent to the styles of Wes Anderson films. The film also does not show liberating shots of the skies, offering a sense of tightness to the setting equivalent to the works of Fritz Lang.

Variety's Owen Gleiberman said that the film "creates the illusion of danger while playing it safe" and wrote that "it lacks the courage of its own conventionality. It's a feel-good movie, all right, but one that uses the fake danger of defanged black comedy to leave us feeling good about the fact that we're above a feel-good movie." Eric Kohn of IndieWire wrote that "Despite a few flashes of tragedy, Jojo Rabbit lingers in a charming muddle of good vibes without really confronting their implications. [Waititi] may be one of the few working directors capable of injecting quirky scenarios with real depth, but in this case, he reduces the underlying circumstances—you know, that Holocaust thing—to a superficial prop."

A. O. Scott of The New York Times wrote that "The particulars of the evil can seem curiously abstract, and the portrayal of goodness can feel a bit false, and forced" and that "Elsa's Jewishness has no real content. She exists mainly as a teaching moment for Johannes. Her plight is a chance for him to prove his bravery." Keith Uhlich of Slant Magazine criticized the film's premise, lack of historical accuracy and realism, and use of anti-semitic canards and stereotypes, and wrote that Waititi's performance as Hitler is "aiming for The Great Dictator but barely hitting Ace Ventura." Little White Lies' Hannah Woodhead criticized the film for its inclusion of a sympathetic Wehrmacht officer, Captain Klenzendorf, writing that it "feels oddly impartial, keen to note that actually, there were some Nice Nazis Too. That's not really something we need to hear in 2019, with white nationalism back in vogue and on the march across much of western civilisation."

The film received a negative critical reception in the UK, with Robbie Collin saying that he was "aghast": the scenes at the camp were "the laziest rip-off of Moonrise Kingdom I've seen in my life", and "there's no sense that anything is at stake [...] it sentimentalises and trivialises the Holocaust [...] the stuff that JoJo is indoctrinated with is made up of old Borat lines, and that's not what anti-Semitism is." Peter Bradshaw agreed: "There are no insights to be had – and no laughs", and calling it "weirdly redundant". Mark Kermode was slightly more positive, but still said that it was "neither sharp enough nor funny enough to cut to the heart of its subject matter."

== Historical accuracy ==
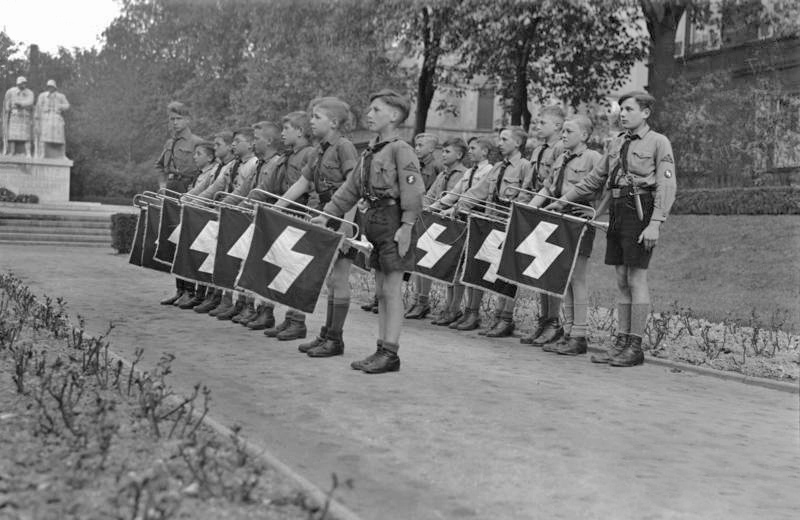
Jungvolk boys fanfare trumpeters at a Nazi rally in the town of Worms in 1933

Despite being a loose depiction of World War II, Jojo Rabbit accurately depicts various aspects of the era. Boys in the Hitler Youth did spread propaganda and collect scrap like Jojo does, and Stielhandgranaten were popularized during World War II. Several mentions of the Axis powers are also said to be accurate, although the film fictionalized a convergence of American and Soviet soldiers in the same battle. The "free Germany" sign style used in the film is also fictional, though other styles were present.

Bundling various historical sources, Time stated that the film depicted the Nazi regime, as seen from a child's perspective, accurately. Many Jungvolk children recalled the experience as being fun and looked upon the regime from an innocent perspective. A memoir by former member Alfons Heck described the program as "an exciting life, free from parental supervision, filled with 'duties' that seemed sheer pleasure." Though female members did not do many physical activities, as seen in the film, they were given traditionally feminine duties, such as farming, cooking, cleaning, singing, swimming, gymnastics, and running, which had the purpose of keeping their bodies fit so they could find a husband and spread the Nazi ideology to their future children.

Jojo Rabbit divided experts of the Holocaust at a panel discussion following a screening at the Museum of Tolerance. Rick Trank, producer of The Long Way Home (1997), felt that, while it has a creative premise, the lack of historical context makes the film detrimental to young viewers, who may misunderstand the premise and think the film's farcical elements are depicting historical reality. However, Claudia Wiedeman, director of education at the USC Shoah Foundation, said that, with the right educational methods and tools, the film could be a useful resource for young people who are learning about World War II. Brian Levin, director of the Center for the Study of Hate & Extremism and professor of criminal justice at California State University, San Bernardino, applauded the film for using sarcasm—an easy-to-understand modern language—to depict Nazi Germany.

External website
- Jojo Rabbit Holocaust resources page at the USC Shoah Foundation's IWitness website.

Jojo Rabbit had an impact on teaching of the Holocaust on December 19, 2019, when the USC Shoah Foundation announced it worked together with Searchlight to develop a classroom curriculum regarding the depiction of Nazism in the film. According to the Foundation, it "demonstrates how individuals can overcome ingrained prejudices and hate" and significantly expands their catalog of Holocaust scholarly resources. This curriculum was combined with Holocaust survivors testimony videos from their Visual History Archive (VHA). These are all bundled into a landing page at the Foundation's IWitness website.

== Accolades ==
Jojo Rabbit and its cast and crew won 14 awards, including the Academy Award for Best Adapted Screenplay that was won by Waititi. The film received a total of six nominations at the 92nd Academy Awards, including Best Supporting Actress for Johansson and Best Picture. Newcomer Davis received various accolades, including a nomination for Best Actor – Motion Picture Musical or Comedy at the 77th Golden Globe Awards and a win as Best Young Performer at the 25th Critics' Choice Awards, a category in which McKenzie and Yates were also nominated. At the Costume Designers Guild Awards 2019, Rubeo won the award for Excellence in Period Film; at the Academy Awards, she was nominated for Best Costume Design. Eagles, Vincent, and set decorator Nora Sopková also received Academy Award nominations. Jojo Rabbit was chosen by the National Board of Review and the American Film Institute as one of the ten best films of 2019.

In 2021, members of Writers Guild of America West (WGAW) and Writers Guild of America, East (WGAE) ranked its screenplay 28th in WGA’s 101 Greatest Screenplays of the 21st Century (so far). In 2025, it was one of the films voted for the "Readers' Choice" edition of The New York Times' list of "The 100 Best Movies of the 21st Century," finishing at number 149.

== See also ==
- A Hidden Life – Another 2019 Searchlight film about Nazi Germany
- Adolf Hitler in popular culture
- List of World War II films
- Rainer Maria Rilke – A figure frequently heard in the film
