= Christine Leunens =

New Zealand-Belgian novelist

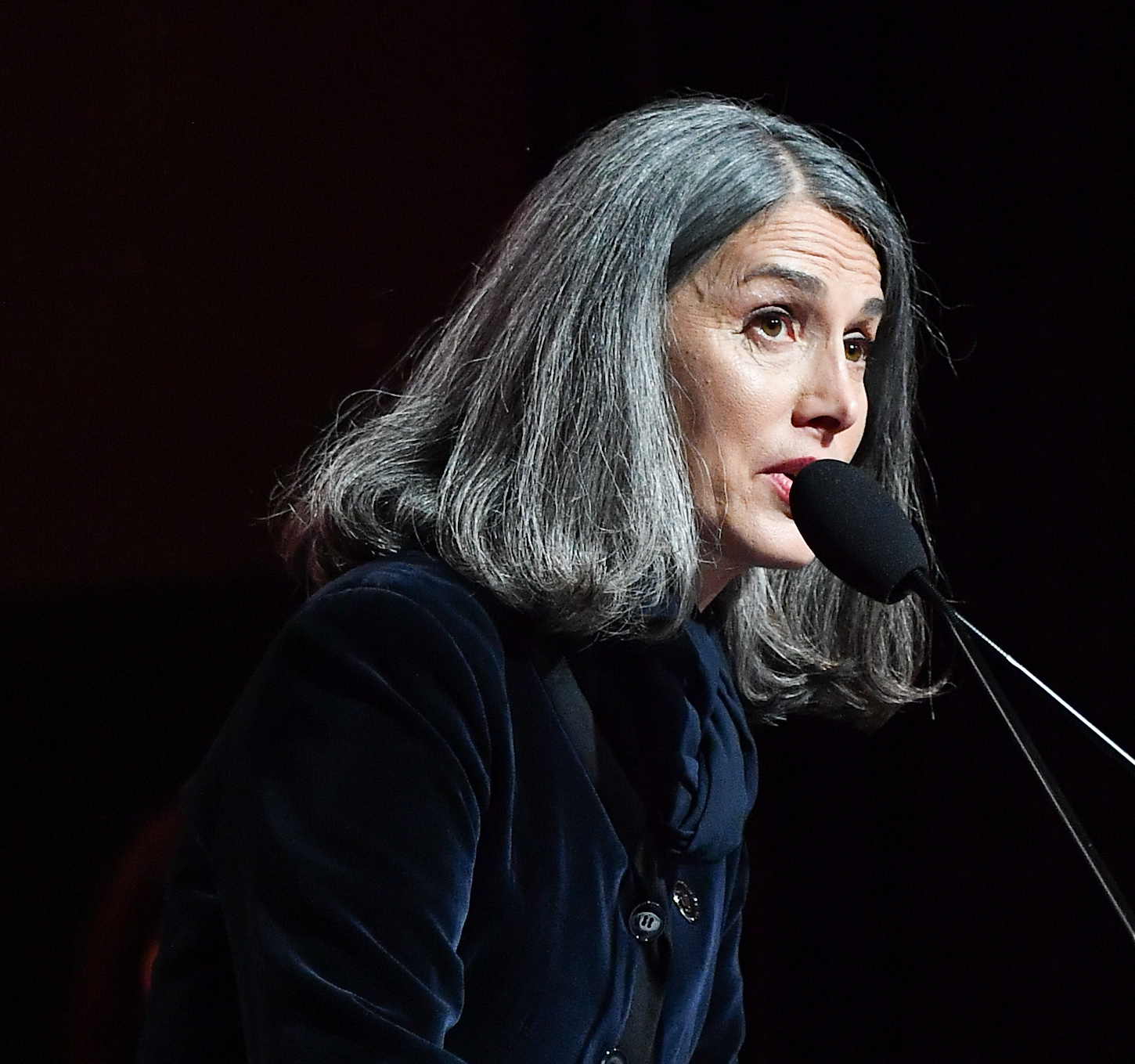
- Leunens at the Humanitas Awards, 2020
- Born: 29 December 1964 (age 61); Hartford, Connecticut, U.S.
- Citizenship: New Zealand; Belgium
- Education: Victoria University of Wellington (PhD); Harvard University (ALM)
- Occupation: novelist
- Writing career
- Period: 1999–present
- Notable works: Primordial Soup; Caging Skies; A Can of Sunshine; In Amber's Wake

Christine Leunens (born 29 December 1964) is a New Zealand-Belgian novelist. She is the author of Primordial Soup, A Can of Sunshine, and In Amber's Wake, which have been translated into twenty-five languages. She is best known for her historical novel Caging Skies, which was adapted into the Academy Award-winning film Jojo Rabbit.

== Early life and education ==
Leunens was born in Hartford, Connecticut, to an Italian mother and a Belgian father. She received her undergraduate degree in French Literature from the University of North Carolina. At the age of nineteen, Leunens moved to Montpellier for a year of study. She supported her studies and early writing career as a print model in France, posing for fashion designers Givenchy, Pierre Balmain, Paco Rabanne, Sonia Rykiel, Nina Ricci, magazines Vogue and Marie Claire, and appearing in television advertisements such as Mercedes-Benz.

In 1990, she spent a year breeding horses on a farm in Picardy during which time she began to write. In 1996, she received the award for Best Original Screenplay from the Centre National du Cinéma. The following year, she attended a summer session studying English literature at Exeter College, Oxford, which prompted her to write her first novel Primordial Soup.

Leunens received a Master of Liberal Arts in English and American Literature from the Harvard Extension School in Cambridge, Massachusetts in 2005. She received the Thomas Small Prize for Academic Achievement and Character and her thesis on Henry James and The Ambassadors received the Dean's Thesis Prize in the Humanities.

In 2008, Leunens was granted a scholarship from Victoria University of Wellington for a PhD in creative writing, and became the second recipient of a PhD at the International Institute of Modern Letters. Her doctoral study, focusing on the portrayal of the mother-in-law figure in English literature, served as inspiration for her novel A Can of Sunshine.

== Literary career ==
Leunens’ first novel, Primordial Soup, published in 1999, explores themes of sex, food, and faith. It was a critical success, receiving praise from The Times, The Sunday Times, The Independent, and Publishers Weekly.

Leunens’ second novel, Caging Skies, was originally published in 2004. Set in Vienna during the Second World War, it follows a member of the Hitler Youth who discovers a young Jewish woman hidden by his parents behind a fake wall of his home. The French edition was nominated for the Prix Médicis étranger in 2007 and the Prix du roman Fnac in 2008.

In 2017, Caging Skies was adapted into a play, which premiered at the Circa Theatre in Wellington. Film director Taika Waititi adapted the novel into the film Jojo Rabbit, which was nominated for six Academy Awards in 2019, winning the Academy Award for Best Adapted Screenplay and the BAFTA Award for Best Adapted Screenplay in 2020. Leunens and Waititi were nominated together for the USC Libraries Scripter Award 2020 that “honors both the author and the screenwriter” and received AFI awards for their “contribution to America’s Cultural Legacy”.

Leunens’ doctoral studies on the mother-in-law and daughter-in-law relationship inspired her third novel, A Can of Sunshine, published in 2013. It tells the story of a young mother having problems with her mother-in-law, a lonely widow, when she herself tragically loses her own husband in a car accident and follows the relationship between the two women over ten years. The novel was selected by the New Zealand Herald as amongst the best books in English worldwide in 2013.

Leunens’ next novel In Amber’s Wake, published in 2022, is a love story set against the backdrop of the 1980s anti-nuclear movement and bombing of the Rainbow Warrior. A film adaptation of the novel is currently in development.

In 2023 Leunens was awarded a UNESCO-Prague City of Literature Writer-in-Residence to work on her fifth novel.

== Personal life ==
Leunens married in 1999 and she and her husband have three children together.

== Novels ==
- Primordial Soup (1999)
- Caging Skies (2008)
- A Can of Sunshine (2013)
- In Amber's Wake (2022)
