= Bong Joon Ho filmography =

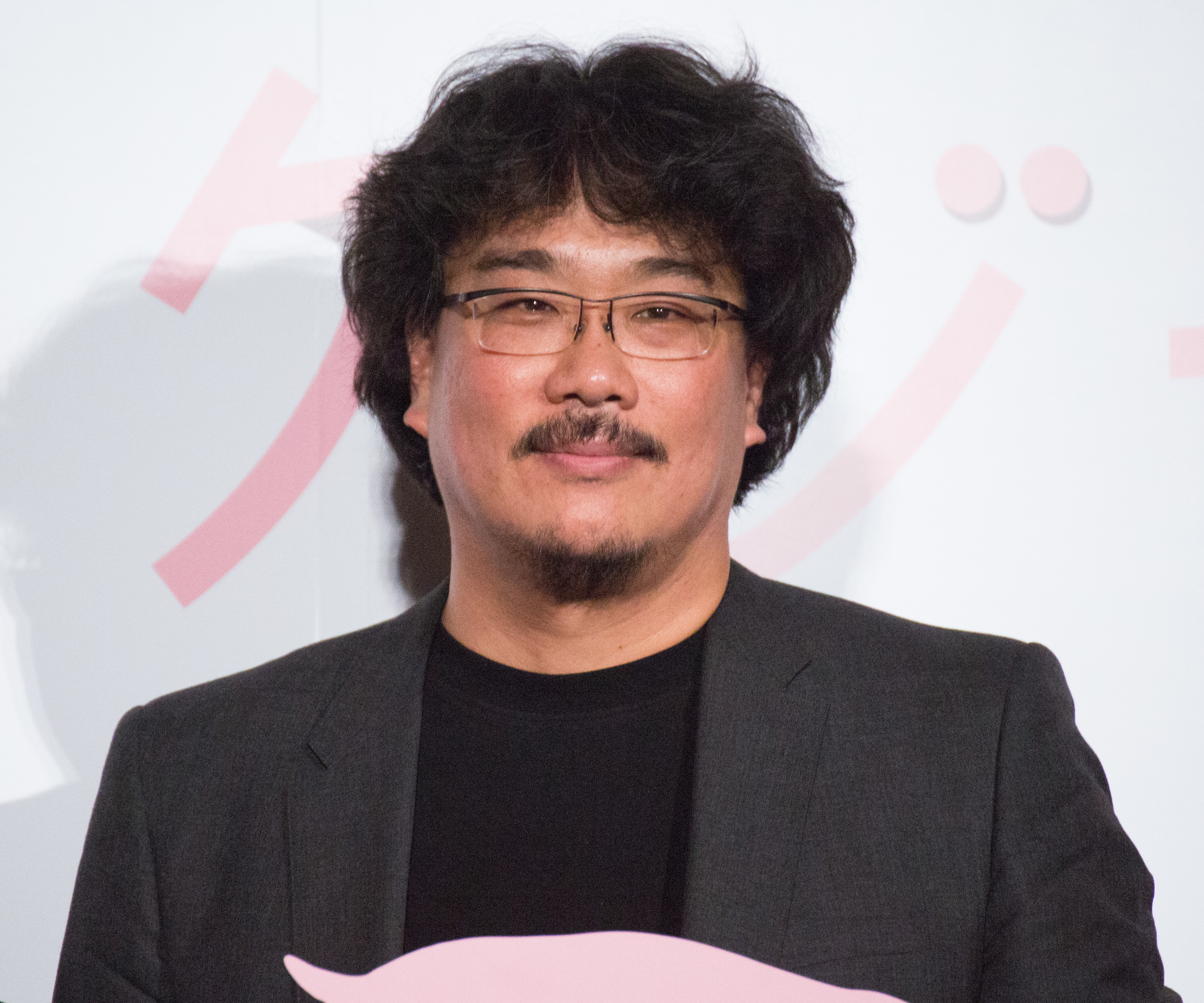
Bong Joon Ho at the Japanese premiere of Okja in 2017

Bong Joon Ho is a South Korean film director, producer, and screenwriter who began his career in 1994 after creating the short films White Man, Memories in My Frame, and Incoherence. In 1997, Bong wrote the feature film Motel Cactus, for which he also served as an assistant director. Two years later, he wrote Phantom: The Submarine, and later made his feature-length directorial debut with Barking Dogs Never Bite (2000). In the following years, Bong wrote and directed Memories of Murder (2003), The Host (2006), Mother (2009), and Snowpiercer (2013), films which received "universal acclaim" from critics.

After writing and producing 2014's Sea Fog, Bong co-wrote, directed, and produced the action-adventure film Okja, which earned a nomination for the Palme d'Or at the 70th Cannes Film Festival. While working on Snowpiercer, Bong was encouraged to write a play, which resulted in the creation and release of the film Parasite in 2019. The film received the Palme d'Or, acclaim from critics internationally, and numerous accolades. It also earned Bong the Academy Award for Best Director, further establishing him as a profound filmmaker around the world.

== Production credits ==
=== Feature films ===
Key
†	Denotes films that have not yet been released

Bong Joon-ho's film credits
Year	Title		Credited as			Notes	Ref(s)
Year	English	Korean	Director	Writer	Producer	Notes	Ref(s)
1997	Motel Cactus	모텔 선인장	Assistant	Yes	No		
1999	Phantom: The Submarine	유령	No	Yes	No		
2000	Barking Dogs Never Bite	플란다스의 개	Yes	Yes	No		
2003	Memories of Murder	살인의 추억	Yes	Yes	No		
2005	Antarctic Journal	남극일기	No	Yes	No		
2006	The Host	괴물	Yes	Yes	No		
2009	Mother	마더	Yes	Yes	No		
2013	Snowpiercer	설국열차	Yes	Yes	No		
2014	Sea Fog	해무	No	Yes	Yes		
2017	Okja	옥자	Yes	Yes	Yes		
2019	Parasite	기생충	Yes	Yes	Yes		
2025	Mickey 17	미키17	Yes	Yes	Yes		
2027	Ally †	앨리	Yes	Yes	Yes	Also storyboard artist	

=== Short films ===
Bong Joon-ho's short film credits
Year	Title	Director	Writer	Segment	Ref(s)
1992	Looking for Paradise	Yes	Yes	—	
1994	White Man	Yes	Yes	—	
1994	Memories in My Frame	Yes	Yes	—	
1994	Incoherence	Yes	Yes	—	
2003	Twentidentity	Yes	Yes	"Sink & Rise"	
2004	Digital Short Films by Three Directors	Yes	Yes	"Influenza"	
2008	Tokyo!	Yes	Yes	"Shaking Tokyo"	
2011	3.11 A Sense of Home Films	Yes	Yes	"Iki"	

=== Television ===
Bong Joon-ho's television credits
Year	Title	Notes	Ref(s)
2020–2024	Snowpiercer	Executive producer	

=== Music videos ===
Bong Joon-ho's music video credits
Year	Song		Artist	Ref(s)
Year	English	Original	Artist	Ref(s)
2000	"Dan"	단(但)	Kim Don Kyu (김돈규)	
2003	"Lonely Street Lamp"	외로운 가로등	Han Young Ae (한영애)	

== Performance credits ==
Bong Joon-ho's performances
Year	Title	Role	Notes	Ref(s)
1994	Incoherence	Delivery boy's brother		
2002	No Blood No Tears	Detective	Cameo	
2006	Two or Three Things I Know About Kim Ki-young	Himself	Documentary film	
2008	Crush and Blush	Private institute student	Cameo	
2011	Kurosawa's Way	Himself	Documentary film	
2012	Doomsday Book	Lee Joon-ho	Cameo	
2012	Ari Ari the Korean Cinema	Himself	Documentary film	
2017	Last Train to Seoul	Himself	Documentary film	

== Critical response ==
Critical response for Bong Joon-ho's films
Year	Film	Rotten Tomatoes	Metacritic
2000	Barking Dogs Never Bite	88% (16 reviews)	66 (8 reviews)
2003	Memories of Murder	95% (74 reviews)	82 (17 reviews)
2006	The Host	93% (155 reviews)	85 (35 reviews)
2009	Mother	96% (118 reviews)	79 (31 reviews)
2013	Snowpiercer	94% (257 reviews)	84 (38 reviews)
2017	Okja	86% (239 reviews)	75 (36 reviews)
2019	Parasite	99% (467 reviews)	96 (52 reviews)
2025	Mickey 17	79% (205 reviews)	73 (54 reviews)

== See also ==
- List of awards and nominations received by Bong Joon-ho
