= List of awards and nominations received by Bong Joon Ho =

Bong Joon Ho awards and nominations
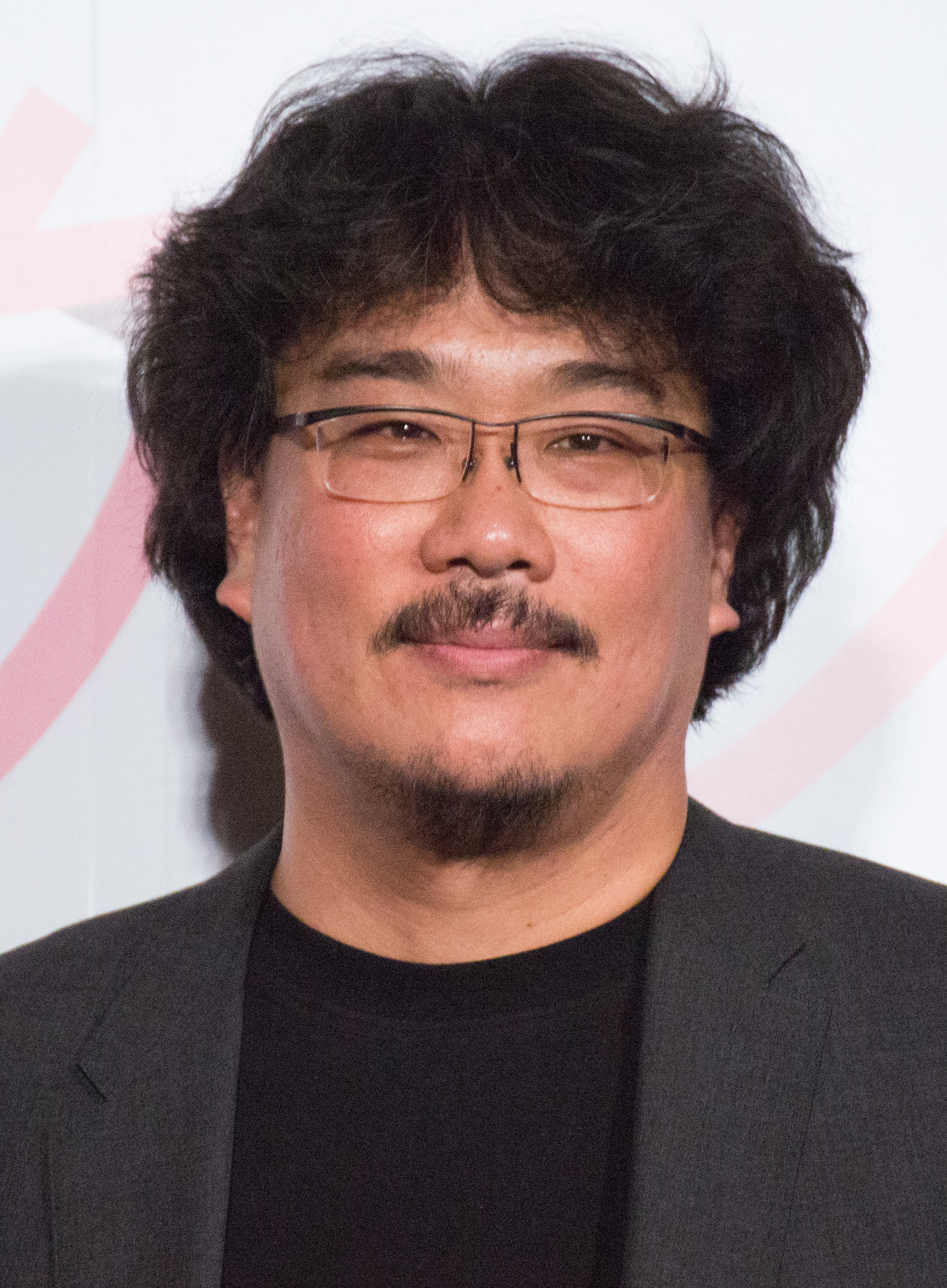
Awards and nominations
Award	Wins	Nominations

Totals (Note: Certain award groups do not simply award one winner. They acknowledge several different recipients, have runners-up, and have third place. Since this is a specific recognition and is different from losing an award, runner-up mentions are considered wins in this award tally. For simplification and to avoid errors, each award in this list has been presumed to have had a prior nomination.)
- Wins: 89
- Nominations: 111

This is a following list of awards and nominations received by Bong Joon Ho.

Bong Joon Ho is a South Korean filmmaker. He has received several accolades including three Academy Awards, two BAFTA Awards and the Cannes Film Festival's Palme d'Or as well as nominations for two Golden Globe Awards.

Joon-ho won the three competitive Academy Awards for Best Picture, Best Director and Best Original Screenplay for his dark comedy satire Parasite (2019). While the film received the Academy Award for Best International Feature Film, the statue isn't awarded to a certain individual, although it is accepted by the winning film's director(s) on stage. The country as a whole is nominated and eventually wins the award.

He received the Cannes Film Festival's top prize the Palme d'Or for Parasite at the 2019 Cannes Film Festival and previously competed with his science-fiction adventure comedy Okja at the 2017 Cannes Film Festival. He received two BAFTA Awards, for Best Original Screenplay and for Best Film Not in the English Language for Parasite at the 73rd British Academy Film Awards.

== Major associations ==
=== Academy Awards ===
Year	Category	Nominated work	Result	Ref.
2019	Best Picture	Parasite	Won	
2019	Best Director	Parasite	Won	
2019	Best Original Screenplay	Parasite	Won	
2019	Best International Feature Film	Parasite	Accepted	

=== BAFTA Awards ===
Year	Category	Nominated work	Result	Ref.
British Academy Film Awards
2019	Best Film	Parasite	Nominated	
2019	Best Director	Parasite	Nominated	
2019	Best Original Screenplay	Parasite	Won	
2019	Best Film Not in the English Language	Parasite	Accepted	

=== Cannes Film Festival ===
Year	Category	Nominated work	Result	Ref.
2017	Palme d'Or	Okja	Nominated	
2019	Palme d'Or	Parasite	Won	

=== Golden Globe Awards ===
Year	Category	Nominated work	Result	Ref.
2019	Best Director	Parasite	Nominated	
2019	Best Screenplay	Parasite	Nominated	

== Awards and nominations ==
Name of the award ceremony, year presented, work(s) nominated, category, and the result of the nomination
Award ceremony	Year	Work(s)	Category	Result	Ref.
Asian Film Awards	2007	The Host	Best Film	Won	
Asian Film Awards	2010	Mother	Best Film	Won	
Asian Film Awards	2010	Mother	Best Screenplay	Won	
Asian Film Awards	2020	Parasite	Best Film	Won	
Asian Film Awards	2020	Parasite	Best Director	Nominated	
Asian Film Awards	2020	Parasite	Best Screenplay	Won	
Asia Pacific Screen Awards	2019	Parasite	Best Feature Film	Won	
Asia-Pacific Film Festival	2013	Snowpiercer	Best Director	Won	
Australian Academy of Cinema and Television Arts Awards	2020	Parasite	Best Asian Film – Cinema	Won	
Australian Academy of Cinema and Television Arts Awards	2020	Parasite	Best International Direction – Cinema	Nominated	
Australian Academy of Cinema and Television Arts Awards	2020	Parasite	Best International Film – Cinema	Won	
Australian Academy of Cinema and Television Arts Awards	2020	Parasite	Best International Screenplay – Cinema	Nominated	
British Independent Film Awards	2019	Parasite	Best Foreign Independent Film	Won	
Baeksang Arts Awards	2007	The Host	Best Film	Won	
Baeksang Arts Awards	2014	Snowpiercer	Best Director	Won	
Baeksang Arts Awards	2020	Parasite	Grand Prize – Film	Won	
Baeksang Arts Awards	2020	Parasite	Best Film	Won	
Baeksang Arts Awards	2020	Parasite	Best Director	Nominated	
Baeksang Arts Awards	2020	Parasite	Best Screenplay	Nominated	
Blue Dragon Film Awards	2003	Memories of Murder	Audience Choice Award	Won	
Blue Dragon Film Awards	2006	The Host	Best Film	Won	
Blue Dragon Film Awards	2006	The Host	Audience Choice Award	Won	
Blue Dragon Film Awards	2009	Mother	Best Film	Won	
Blue Dragon Film Awards	2013	Snowpiercer	Best Director	Won	
Blue Dragon Film Awards	2019	Parasite	Best Film	Won	
Blue Dragon Film Awards	2019	Parasite	Best Director	Won	
Blue Dragon Film Awards	2019	Parasite	Best Screenplay	Nominated	
Buil Film Awards	2009	Mother	Best Film	Won	
Buil Film Awards	2013	Snowpiercer	Best Film	Won	
Buil Film Awards	2019	Parasite	Best Film	Won	
Buil Film Awards	2019	Parasite	Best Screenplay	Won	
Buil Film Awards	2019	Parasite	Best Director	Nominated	
Busan Film Critics Awards	2003	Memories of Murder	Best Director	Won	
Busan Film Critics Awards	2003	Memories of Murder	Best Screenplay	Won	
Busan Film Critics Awards	2006	The Host	Special Jury Prize	Won	
Busan Film Critics Awards	2009	Mother	Best Film	Won	
Busan Film Critics Awards	2013	Snowpiercer	Best Screenplay	Won	
Critics' Choice Awards	2020	Parasite	Best Movie	Nominated	
Critics' Choice Awards	2020	Parasite	Best Movie Director (Note: Tied with Sam Mendes for 1917.)	Won	
Critics' Choice Awards	2020	Parasite	Best Movie Original Screenplay Writer	Nominated	
Chunsa Film Art Awards	2003	Memories of Murder	Best Film	Won	
Chunsa Film Art Awards	2003	Memories of Murder	Best Director	Won	
Chunsa Film Art Awards	2003	Memories of Murder	Best Screenplay	Won	
Chunsa Film Art Awards	2019	Parasite	Best Director	Won	
Chunsa Film Art Awards	2019	Parasite	Best Screenplay	Won	
Chunsa Film Art Awards	2020	Parasite	White Crane Award	Won	
Director's Cut Awards	2000	Barking Dogs Never Bite	Best New Director	Won	
Director's Cut Awards	2003	Memories of Murder	Best Director	Won	
Director's Cut Awards	2014	Snowpiercer	Best Director	Won	
Director's Cut Awards	2017	Okja	Best Director	Won	
Director's Cut Awards	2019	Parasite	Best Director	Won	
Director's Cut Awards	2019	Parasite	Best Screenwriter	Won	
Directors Guild of America Award	2020	Parasite	Outstanding Directorial Achievement – Feature Film	Nominated	
Dubai International Film Festival	2009	Mother	Best Screenplay	Won	
Grand Bell Awards	2003	Memories of Murder	Best Film	Won	
Grand Bell Awards	2003	Memories of Murder	Best Director	Won	
Grand Bell Awards	2007	The Host	Best Director	Won	
Grand Bell Awards	2020	Parasite	Best Film	Won	
Grand Bell Awards	2020	Parasite	Best Director	Won	
Grand Bell Awards	2020	Parasite	Best Screenplay	Won	
Hollywood Film Awards	2019	Parasite	Hollywood Filmmaker Award	Won	
Hugo Awards	2026	Mickey 17	Best Dramatic Presentation, Long Form	Nominated	
Festival du Film Policier de Cognac	2004	Memories of Murder	Grand Prix	Won	
Fantasporto	2007	The Host	Best Director	Won	
Korean Association of Film Critics Awards	2003	Memories of Murder	Best Film	Won	
Korean Association of Film Critics Awards	2003	Memories of Murder	Best Director	Won	
Korean Association of Film Critics Awards	2009	Mother	Best Film	Won	
Korean Association of Film Critics Awards	2009	Mother	Best Screenplay	Won	
Korean Association of Film Critics Awards	2013	Snowpiercer	Best Film	Won	
Korean Association of Film Critics Awards	2013	Snowpiercer	Best Director	Won	
Korean Association of Film Critics Awards	2017	Okja	FIPRESCI Award	Won	
Korean Association of Film Critics Awards	2019	Parasite	Best Film	Won	
Korean Association of Film Critics Awards	2019	Parasite	Best Director	Won	
Korean Association of Film Critics Awards	2019	Parasite	Top 10 Films of the Year	Won	
Korean Film Awards	2003	Memories of Murder	Best Film	Won	
Korean Film Awards	2003	Memories of Murder	Best Director	Won	
Korean Film Awards	2003	Memories of Murder	Best Screenplay	Won	
Korean Film Awards	2006	The Host	Best Film	Won	
Korean Film Awards	2006	The Host	Best Director	Won	
Los Angeles Film Critics Association	2019	Parasite	Best Film	Won	
Los Angeles Film Critics Association	2019	Parasite	Best Director	Won	
Los Angeles Film Critics Association	2019	Parasite	Best Screenplay	Runner-up	
London Film Critics' Circle	2020	Parasite	Film of the Year	Won	
London Film Critics' Circle	2020	Parasite	Director of the Year	Won	
London Film Critics' Circle	2020	Parasite	Screenwriter of the Year	Nominated	
Mar del Plata International Film Festival	2009	Mother	SIGNIS Award	Won	
National Society of Film Critics	2020	Parasite	Best Picture	Won	
National Society of Film Critics	2020	Parasite	Best Director	2nd Place	
National Society of Film Critics	2020	Parasite	Best Screenplay	Won	
Producers Guild of America Award	2020	Parasite	Outstanding Motion Picture Production	Nominated	
San Sebastián International Film Festival	2003	Memories of Murder	Silver Shell for Best Director	Won	
San Sebastián International Film Festival	2003	Memories of Murder	Altadis New Director Award	Won	
San Sebastián International Film Festival	2003	Memories of Murder	FIPRESCI Award	Won	
Sitges Film Festival	2006	The Host	Orient Express Award for Best Asian Film	Won	
Satellite Awards	2020	Parasite	Best Director	Nominated	
Satellite Awards	2020	Parasite	Best Original Screenplay	Nominated	
Tokyo International Film Festival	2003	Memories of Murder	Asian Film Award	Won	
Torino Film Festival	2003	Memories of Murder	Best Screenplay (Audience Award)	Won	
Writers Guild of America Awards	2020	Parasite	Outstanding Writing – Motion Picture Original Screenplay	Won	

== State honors ==
List of State Honour(s)
Country	Award Ceremony	Year	Honor	Ref.
France	130th Anniversary of Korea-France Diplomatic Relations (Note: Local French cinema showcase hosted by French luxury brand S.T. Dupont held at the CGV theater in Cheongdam, Seoul.)	2016	Ordre des Arts et des Lettres Officier	
South Korea	Ministry of Culture, Sports and Tourism (Note: Honoured for international accomplishment of Parasite.)	2019	Eungwan Order of Cultural Merit (2nd Class)	

== Listicles ==
Name of publisher, year listed, name of listicle, and placement
Publisher	Year	Listicle	Placement	Ref.
Forbes	2020	Korea Power Celebrity 40	5th	
Herald Economy	2008	Pop Culture Power Leader Big 30	25th	
Herald Economy	2011	Pop Culture Power Leader Big 30	26th	
Herald Economy	2013	Pop Culture Power Leader Big 30	11th	
Herald Economy	2014	Pop Culture Power Leader Big 30	21st	
Korea Newspaper Journalists Association	2025	100 Great Koreans Awards	Included	
Korea Newspaper Journalists Association	2026	K-Culture 100 Great Koreans Awards	Included	
Sisa Journal	2003	Person of the Year — Culture	1st	
Sisa Journal	2008	Next Generation Leader — Film Industry	Runner-up	
Sisa Journal	2009	Next Generation Leader — Film Industry	Runner-up	
Sisa Journal	2010	Next Generation Leader — Film Industry	1st	
Sisa Journal	2011	Next Generation Leader — Film Industry	1st	
Sisa Journal	2012	Next Generation Leader — Film Industry	1st	
Sisa Journal	2013	Next Generation Leader — Film Industry	1st	
Sisa Journal	2013	Next Generation Leader — Entertainment	3rd	
Sisa Journal	2014	Next Generation Leader — Film Industry	1st	
Sisa Journal	2015	Next Generation Leader — Pop Culture	1st	
Sisa Journal	2015	Next Generation Leaders 100	26th	
Sisa Journal	2016	Next Generation Leader — Culture, Arts, Sports	8th	
Sisa Journal	2017	Korea's Most Influential Cultural Artists	5th	
Sisa Journal	2017	Next Generation Leader — Culture, Arts, Sports	8th	
Sisa Journal	2018	Korea's Most Influential Cultural Artists	9th	
Sisa Journal	2018	Next Generation Leader — Culture, Arts, Sports	22nd	
Sisa Journal	2019	Korea's Most Influential Cultural Artists	1st	
Sisa Journal	2020	Person of the Year-Culture	1st	
Sisa Journal	2020	Korea's Most Influential Cultural Artists	1st	
Sisa Journal	2021	Person of the Year — Culture	1st	
Sisa Journal	2022	Korea's Most Influential Cultural Artists	1st	
Sisa Journal	2023	Korea's Most Influential Cultural Artists	1st	
