= Sea Fog =

2014 South Korean film directed by Shim Sung-bo

- Theatrical release poster
- Hangul: 해무
- Hanja: 海霧
- RR: Haemu
- MR: Haemu
- Directed by: Shim Sung-bo
- Written by: Shim Sung-bo; Bong Joon-ho
- Based on: Haemoo by Kim Min Jeong
- Produced by: Bong Joon-ho; Lewis Taewan Kim; Jo Neung-yeon
- Starring: Kim Yoon-seok; Park Yoo-chun; Han Ye-ri; Lee Hee-joon; Moon Sung-keun; Kim Sang-ho
- Cinematography: Hong Kyung-pyo
- Edited by: Kim Sang-bum; Kim Jae-bum
- Music by: Jung Jae-il
- Production companies: Lewis Pictures; Finecut
- Distributed by: Next Entertainment World
- Release date: August 13, 2014
- Running time: 110 minutes
- Country: South Korea
- Language: Korean
- Budget: US$10 million
- Box office: US$11.4 million

Sea Fog (Korean: 해무; RR: Haemu) is a 2014 South Korean crime thriller film directed by Shim Sung-bo. The film is adapted from the 2007 stage play Haemoo, which in turn was based on the true story of 25 Korean-Chinese illegal immigrants who suffocated to death in the storage tank of the fishing vessel Taechangho; their bodies were dumped by the ship's crew into the sea southwest of Yeosu on October 7, 2001. The original play, written by Kim Min Jeong and directed by Ahn Kyung-mo, was performed in 2007 as part of Yeonwoo Stage's 30th anniversary celebration.

It was selected as the South Korean entry for the Best Foreign Language Film at the 87th Academy Awards and the 72nd Golden Globe Awards, but was not nominated.

== Plot ==
The 69-ton fishing vessel Jeonjinho fails to catch as much fish as its crew had hoped. To make more money, the crew decides to smuggle thirty illegal immigrants into South Korea. But things don't go according to plan when the Jeonjinho encounters heavy fog, rain and waves on its return journey, while also being chased by a ship from the South Korean Maritime Police. On orders from the captain, several crew members hide the illegal immigrants inside the fishing tank, where they are in danger of suffocating to death. Amid the chaos, the youngest crew member Dong-sik tries to protect a young female migrant with whom he'd fallen in love.

== Cast ==
- Kim Yoon-seok as Captain Cheol-joo
- Park Yoo-chun as Dong-sik
- Han Ye-ri as Hong-mae
- Lee Hee-joon as Chang-wook
- Moon Sung-keun as Chief engineer Wan-ho
- Kim Sang-ho as Boatswain Ho-young
- Yoo Seung-mok as Kyung-gu
- Jung In-gi as Oh-nam
- Kim Young-woong as Gil-soo
- Ye Soo-jung as Dong-shik's grandmother
- Yeom Hye-ran as Shipowner's wife

== Production ==
Sea Fog is the first feature film directed by Shim Sung-bo, who co-wrote the screenplay of Memories of Murder with director Bong Joon-ho. Bong is this film's producer.

Kim Yoon-seok was first cast in the role of the ship's captain in June 2013. Song Joong-ki was originally offered to star opposite Kim, but had to turn down the role when he received his enlistment papers for mandatory military service. K-pop singer and actor Park Yoochun was cast instead in August 2013, in his big screen debut. Filming began on October 6, 2013, with locations in Masan, Goyang, Busan and Ulsan, and ended on March 6, 2014.

Budgeted at US$10 million, the film was pitched for pre-sales at the American Film Market in November 2013. The first official press conference was held on July 1, 2014.

== Box office ==
Sea Fog was released in South Korea on August 13, 2014. It reached 1,084,375 admissions after one week.

== Critical reception ==
The review aggregator Rotten Tomatoes reported that 77% of critics have given the film a positive review based on 13 reviews, with an average rating of 6.17/10. On Metacritic, the film has a weighted average score of 61 out of 100 based on 6 critic reviews, indicating "generally favorable reviews". The Hollywood Reporter described the film as "A possible riveting nightmare fogged up by concessions to blockbuster conventions." It praised Hong Kyung-pyo's cinematography and Lee Ha-joon's production design as "effective in highlighting the differences between the lands of vast, cold port and the unforgiving environments of the sea and cramped insides of the fishing boat," but criticized director Shim Sung-bo's lack of subtlety and reflection, "with Haemoo subscribing to many of the conventions of both disaster epics and revenge drama, and the over-dependence of a central seaborne romance."

Variety wrote, "Turning a real-life human trafficking tragedy into a comment on social inequality and the cost of survival, Haemoo dramatizes a stark nautical ordeal fraught with tension. Produced and co-written by internationally recognized Korean auteur Bong Joon-ho (Snowpiercer, The Host) this directing debut by helmer-scribe Shim Sung-bo echoes Bong's trademark cynical vision of human nature, but the characters lack dimensionality and psychological depth."

== International release ==
Sea Fog made its international premiere at the 2014 Toronto International Film Festival. It was also invited to the following:

- 2014 Toronto International Film Festival
- 2014 Vancouver International Film Festival
- 2014 San Sebastián International Film Festival
- 2014 Taoyuan International Film Festival
- 2014 Busan International Film Festival
- 2014 Fantastic Fest
- 2014 Festival du Film Coréen à Paris
- 2014 Hawaii International Film Festival
- 2014 Hong Kong Asian Film Festival
- 2014 Stockholm International Film Festival
- 2014 London Korean Film Festival
- 2014 American Film Institute Festival
- 2014 Philippines Cinema One Originals Festival under the Asian Gem category
- 2014 Mar del Plata International Film Festival
- 2014 Madrid Premiere Week
- 2014 Tallinn Black Nights Film Festival
- 2014 Marrakech International Film Festival
- 2014 Filmasia Festival in Prague
- 2014 Dubai International Film Festival
- 2015 Palm Springs International Film Festival
- 2015 Fantasporto Oporto International Film Festival
- 2015 Santa Barbara International Film Festival
- 2015 Annual Waimea Town Celebration
- 2015 New Directors/New Films Festival in New York City
- 2015 Florence Korea Film Festival in Italy
- 2015 Brussels International Fantastic Film Festival
- 2015 Beaune International Thriller Film Festival
- 2015 Art Film Fest in Slovakia

The film's rights were also pre-sold at the Cannes Film Market to Taiwan, Hong Kong, Singapore, Japan and France. Its Japanese release was scheduled for early 2015 while Taiwan and Singapore released the movie at the end of 2014.

== Awards and nominations ==
Year	Award	Category	Recipient	Result
2014	34th Hawaii International Film Festival	Golden Orchid for Best Narrative Feature	Sea Fog	Won
2014	34th Korean Association of Film Critics Awards	Best New Actor	Park Yoochun	Won
2014	51st Grand Bell Awards	Best Supporting Actress	Han Ye-ri	Nominated
2014	51st Grand Bell Awards	Best New Director	Shim Sung-bo	Nominated
2014	51st Grand Bell Awards	Best New Actor	Park Yoochun	Won
2014	51st Grand Bell Awards	Best Cinematography	Hong Kyung-pyo	Nominated
2014	51st Grand Bell Awards	Best Lighting	Kim Chang-ho	Nominated
2014	15th Busan Film Critics Awards	Best New Director	Shim Sung-bo	Won
2014	15th Busan Film Critics Awards	Best New Actor	Park Yoochun	Won
2014	4th SACF Beautiful Artists Awards	Best New Actor	Park Yoochun	Won
2014	35th Blue Dragon Film Awards	Best Supporting Actress	Han Ye-ri	Nominated
2014	35th Blue Dragon Film Awards	Best New Director	Shim Sung-bo	Nominated
2014	35th Blue Dragon Film Awards	Best New Actor	Park Yoochun	Won
2014	35th Blue Dragon Film Awards	Best Screenplay	Shim Sung-bo, Bong Joon-ho	Nominated
2014	35th Blue Dragon Film Awards	Best Cinematography	Hong Kyung-pyo	Nominated
2014	35th Blue Dragon Film Awards	Best Lighting	Kim Chang-ho	Nominated
2014	35th Blue Dragon Film Awards	Best Art Direction	Lee Ha-jun	Won
2014	Star Night Showbiz Awards (Korea Film Actor's Association)	Popular Star Award	Park Yoochun	Won
2014	1st Korean Film Producers Association Awards	Best Cinematography	Hong Kyung-pyo	Won
2015	6th KOFRA Film Awards	Best New Actor	Park Yoochun	Won
2015	10th Max Movie Awards	Best Actor	Park Yoochun	Nominated
2015	10th Max Movie Awards	Best Supporting Actress	Han Ye-ri	Nominated
2015	10th Max Movie Awards	Best New Actor	Park Yoochun	Won
2015	10th Max Movie Awards	Best Trailer	Sea Fog	Won
2015	10th Max Movie Awards	Best Poster	Sea Fog	Nominated
2015	20th Chunsa Film Art Awards	Best Supporting Actress	Han Ye-ri	Nominated
2015	20th Chunsa Film Art Awards	Technical Award		Nominated
2015	9th Asian Film Awards	Best Supporting Actress	Han Ye-ri	Nominated
2015	51st Baeksang Arts Awards	Best Supporting Actress	Han Ye-ri	Nominated
2015	51st Baeksang Arts Awards	Best New Actor	Park Yoochun	Won
2015	51st Baeksang Arts Awards	Best Screenplay	Shim Sung-bo, Bong Joon-ho	Nominated
2015	24th Buil Film Awards	Best Supporting Actress	Han Ye-ri	Nominated
2015	24th Buil Film Awards	Best New Actor	Park Yoochun	Nominated
2015	24th Buil Film Awards	Best Cinematography	Hong Kyung-pyo	Won
2015	24th Buil Film Awards	Best Art Direction	Lee Ha-jun	Nominated

== See also ==
- List of submissions to the 87th Academy Awards for Best Foreign Language Film
- List of South Korean submissions for the Academy Award for Best Foreign Language Film
