= Ally (film) =

Upcoming animated film

- Hangul: 앨리
- RR: Aelli
- MR: Aelli
- Directed by: Bong Joon Ho
- Written by: Bong Joon Ho; Jason Yu
- Story by: Bong Joon Ho
- Produced by: Bong Joon Ho; Seo Woo-sik
- Starring: Alex Jayne Go; Ayo Edebiri; Bradley Cooper; Dave Bautista; Finn Wolfhard; Rachel House; Werner Herzog
- Cinematography: Hong Kyung-pyo
- Edited by: Yang Jin-mo
- Music by: Marco Beltrami
- Production companies: 4th Creative Party; Barunson C&C; Penture Invest
- Distributed by: CJ Entertainment
- Release dates: July 14, 2027; (France); July 2027 (South Korea)
- Countries: South Korea; United Kingdom
- Language: English

Ally (Korean: 앨리) is an upcoming English-language South Korean animated adventure comedy-drama film directed and produced by Bong Joon Ho (in his animated feature debut), with a screenplay co-written alongside Jason Yu. The film was inspired by real-life marine creatures, explores themes of friendship and courage as encounters between humans and the creatures of the deep reshape both worlds.

The film features Alex Jayne Go as the voice of the titular character, alongside Ayo Edebiri, Bradley Cooper, Dave Bautista, Finn Wolfhard, Rachel House, and Werner Herzog as supporting roles. The film is set to be released on July 14, 2027 in France, and July 2027 in South Korea.

== Premise ==
Ally, a piglet squid living in the uncharted depths of the South Pacific Ocean, dreams of one day seeing the sun and becoming the star of a wildlife documentary. When a mysterious aircraft sinks into the ocean, her world is suddenly threatened. Alongside unlikely companions, Ally begins a journey that will take her to the surface.

== Voice cast ==
- Alex Jayne Go as Ally
- Ayo Edebiri
- Bradley Cooper
- Dave Bautista
- Finn Wolfhard
- Rachel House
- Ray Panthaki
- Werner Herzog

== Production ==
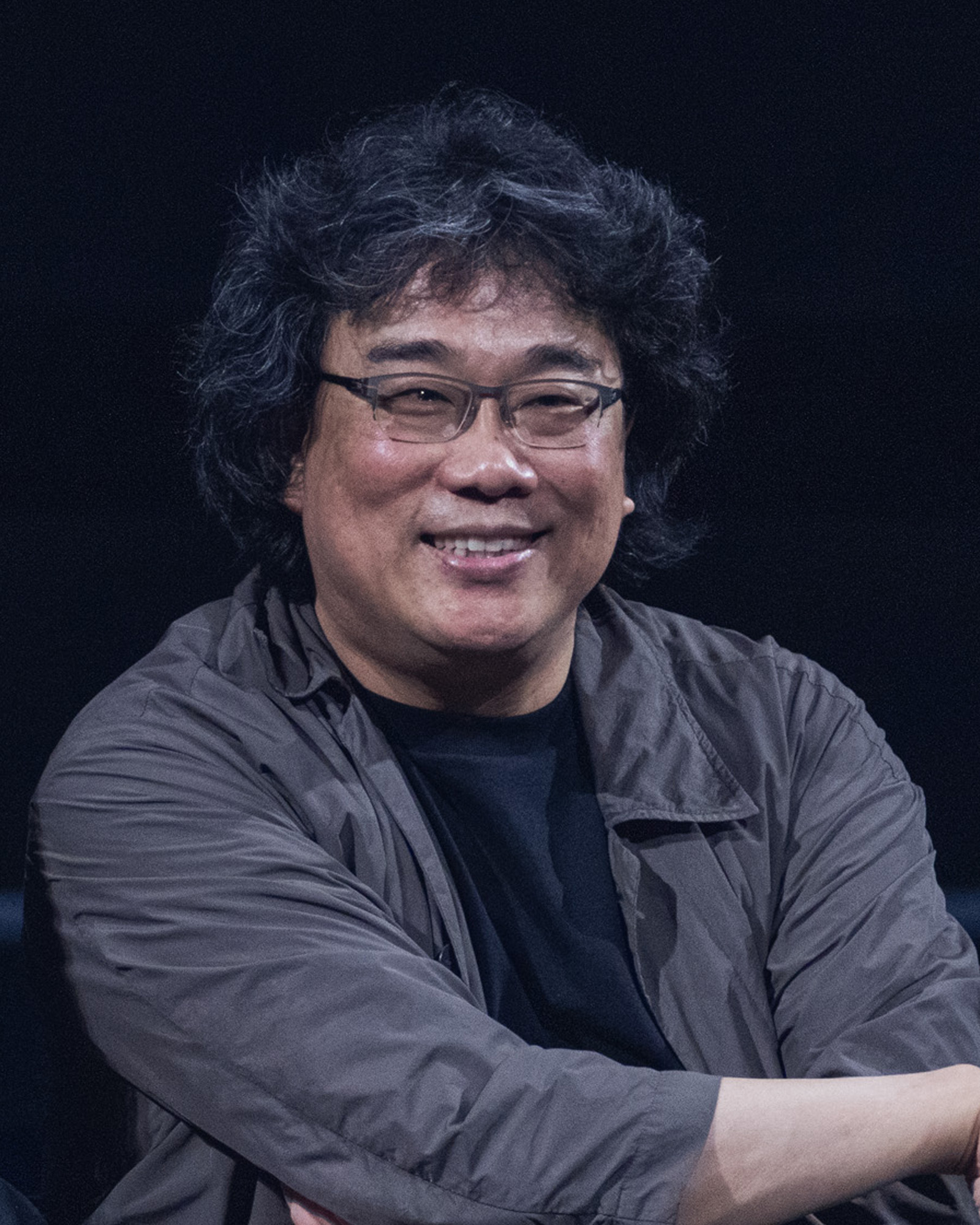
Director Bong Joon Ho in 2025

Bong Joon Ho's first experience producing animation came when he made a stop-motion animated short film, Looking For Paradise, during his university days with the Yellow Door film club as explored in the documentary film Yellow Door: '90s Lo-fi Film Club. Bong, after having previously made all live-action films, had since expressed a desire to revisit animation, making this project a meaningful return to the medium.

The film was announced in 2018, after the completion of Bong's critically-acclaimed film Parasite. Bong and Jason Yu began co-writing the screenplay this year and completed it in early 2021. Seo Woo-sik, producer of Bong's Mother and Okja, stated Bong sketched storyboards for the animation process in his hotel room. Inspired by Claire Nouvian's novel The Deep: The Extraordinary Creatures of the Abyss, Bong describes the film as exploring the connection between deep-sea creatures and humans. Werner Herzog will be part of the voice cast in the film. Alex Jayne Go, Ayo Edebiri, Bradley Cooper, Dave Bautista, Finn Wolfhard, and Rachel House were also announced in May 2026.

In an Arena Homme + interview on March 20, 2025, Bong said that The Valley (더 밸리) was the film's working title. In April 2026, Deadline Hollywood reported the film would be titled Ally, featuring a piglet squid named "Ally" as the main character.

=== Animation ===
The film will be handled by DNEG.

=== Music ===
Marco Beltrami was announced as the film's composer in April 2026, after previously working with Bong on Snowpiercer (2013).

== Release ==
The film is set for a 2027 international release. Pathé will directly distribute in France, the Benelux, Switzerland and West Africa. The company also handled international sales outside China, Hong Kong, Taiwan and Japan, where Penture Invest sold rights to other distributors, as well as South Korea, Turkey, Indonesia and Vietnam, where CJ Entertainment will directly release the film. In April 2026, Neon, which previously distributed Bong's 2019 film Parasite, acquired North American distribution rights to Ally.
