= The Devil's Game (film) =

- Theatrical poster
- Hangul: 더 게임
- RR: Deo geim
- MR: Tŏ keim
- Directed by: Yoon In-ho
- Written by: Yoon In-ho; Kim Mi-ra; Lee Jae-jin
- Produced by: Lee Seo-yeol; Kim Sang-yun; Park Chang-hyeon; Jeong Geun-hyeon
- Starring: Shin Ha-kyun; Byun Hee-bong
- Cinematography: Baek Dong-hyeon
- Edited by: Moon In-dae
- Music by: Kim Jun-seong
- Distributed by: Prime Entertainment
- Release date: 31 January 2008
- Running time: 116 minutes
- Country: South Korea
- Language: Korean
- Box office: US$10,287,987

The Devil's Game (Korean: 더 게임; RR: Deo geim; lit. 'The Game') is a 2008 South Korean film.

== Plot ==
Struggling artist Min Hee-do (Shin Ha-kyun), is offered three billion won to bet his life to a game against a rich old man, Kang No-sik (Byun Hee-bong), who is dying from a terminal illness. The game is for each man to dial a random phone number and guess if the person who answers will be male or female. He loses the bet, and after a monthlong brain operation, he wakes up to find that they have swapped bodies.

== Cast ==
- Shin Ha-kyun as Min Hee-do
- Byun Hee-bong as Kang No-sik
- Lee Hye-young as Lee Hye-rin, No-sik's wife
- Son Hyun-joo as Min Tae-seok, Hee-do's uncle
- Lee Eun-sung as Joo Eun-ah, Hee-do's girlfriend
- Jang Hang-sun as Park Chang-ha
- Kim Hyeok as Secretary Mr. Ahn
- Choo Sang-rok as Dr. Kim
- Maeng Bong-hak as Trustee Mr. Yoon
- Jo Cheong-ho as President Kim

== Release ==
The Devil's Game was released in South Korea on 31 January 2008, and topped the box office on its opening weekend with 361,650 admissions. As of 31 March 2008 it had received a total of 1,496,215 admissions, and as of 16 March 2008 grossed a toal of US$10,287,987.
