= Shim Sung-bo =

South Korean filmmaker (born 1972)

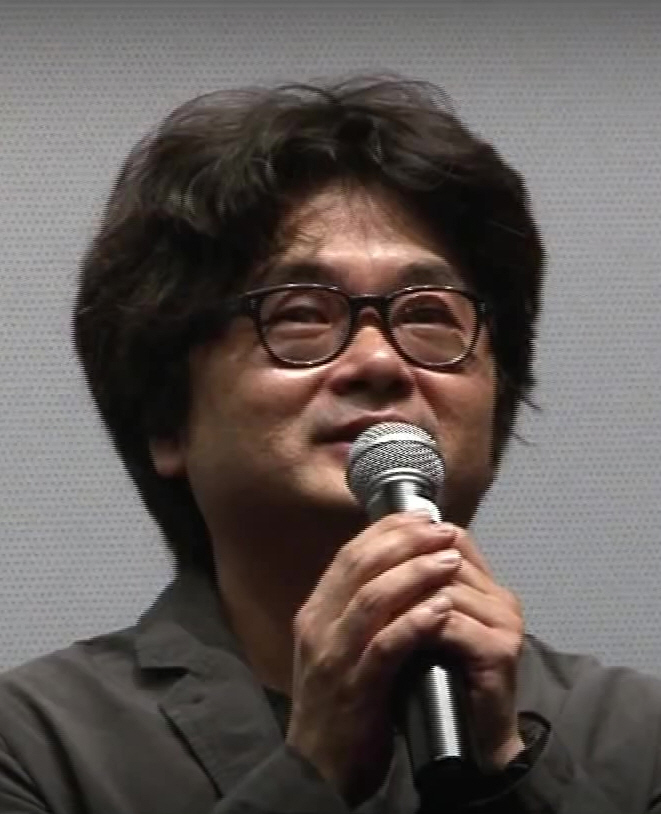
- Born: 1972 (age 53–54); South Korea
- Education: Korea National University of Arts
- Occupations: Film director, screenwriter

Korean name
- Hangul: 심성보
- RR: Sim Seongbo
- MR: Sim Sŏngbo

Shim Sung-bo (Korean: 심성보; born 1972) is a South Korean film director and screenwriter.

== Filmography ==
- Memories of Murder (2003) - screenwriter, assistant director, script editor, actor
- Visiting Report in Korea (short film, 2004) - director
- What the...? (2011) - director
- Sea Fog (2014) - director, screenwriter

== Awards ==
- 2003 11th Chunsa Film Art Awards: Best Screenplay (Memories of Murder)
- 2003 2nd Korean Film Awards: Best Screenplay (Memories of Murder)
- 2014 15th Busan Film Critics Awards: Best New Director (Sea Fog)
