= The Stone (2013 film) =

- Film poster
- Directed by: Cho Se-rae
- Written by: Cho Se-rae
- Produced by: Jo Hyun-woo
- Starring: Cho Dong-in; Kim Roi-ha; Park Won-sang
- Cinematography: Ha Kyung-ho
- Edited by: Uhm Jin-hwa
- Music by: Noh Hyeong-woo
- Production company: Shine Picture
- Distributed by: Cinus Entertainment
- Release dates: August 2013 (Locarno); June 12, 2014 (South Korea)
- Running time: 119 minutes
- Country: South Korea
- Language: Korean

The Stone (Korean: 스톤; RR: Seuton) is a 2013 South Korean film written and directed by Cho Se-rae. It premiered at the 2013 Locarno International Film Festival.

== Plot ==
Min-su is a graduate of the Korean Baduk Academy but despite his outstanding talent, he has been wasting his days as a gambler without pursuing a real career out of it. He chooses to play the game for money, easily beating every opponent that comes his way. Nam-hae is a middle-aged, smalltime gangster boss, brought up on the streets and used to using his fists to gain authority. After accidentally meeting, playing and losing to Min-su in a gambling club, while his goons were collecting the monthly installment of protection money, his taste for the ancient game is rekindled and he hires the boy to become his private instructor.

As he goes deeper into the baduk experience, Nam-hae begins reviewing his own past in the perspective of the rules and requirements of the game and begins to lose interest in the criminal world, becoming far more concerned with the future of his tutor, whom he encourages to face the challenge of a pro tournament and carve a legitimate future for himself. The fatherless young Min-su, on the other hand, discovers the coarse masculine underworld, the meaning of life and true victory through Nam-hae. However, when Nam-hae's competition starts to expand their territory, he is forced into a path to destruction.

== Cast ==
- Cho Dong-in as Min-su
- Kim Roi-ha as Nam-hae
- Park Won-sang as In-geol
- Myung Gye-nam
- Park Min-gyu
- Son Jong-hak
- Kim Dong-gon
- Jo Ji-hwan
- Heo Joon-seok
- Choi Jeong-hyeon
- Il Soo-pa
- So Hee-jung
