= Bong Joon Ho =

South Korean filmmaker (born 1969)

- Bong at the Busan International Film Festival, 2025
- Born: September 14, 1969 (age 57); Daegu, South Korea
- Education: Yonsei University
- Occupations: Film director; screenwriter; producer
- Years active: 1994–present
- Works: Full list
- Political party: Democratic Labor Party (2003–2008); New Progressive Party (2008–2012)
- Spouse: Jung Sun-young (m. 1995)
- Children: 1
- Father: Bong Sang-gyun
- Relatives: Park Taewon (grandfather)
- Awards: Full list

Korean name
- Hangul: 봉준호
- Hanja: 奉俊昊
- RR: Bong Junho
- MR: Pong Chunho

Bong Joon Ho (Korean: 봉준호; pronounced [poːŋ tɕuːnho]; born September 14, 1969) is a South Korean filmmaker. His work is characterized by emphasis on social and class themes, genre-mixing, dark comedy, and sudden tone shifts. He is the recipient of numerous accolades including three Academy Awards, two British Academy Film Awards, and five Asian Film Awards, as well as nominations for two Golden Globe Awards. In 2017, he was included on Metacritic's list of the 25 best film directors of the 21st century, and in 2020, he was listed as one of the 100 most influential people in the world by Time and among the Bloomberg 50.

Bong first became known to audiences and gained a cult following with his feature directorial debut, the dark comedy film Barking Dogs Never Bite (2000). He later achieved widespread critical success with his subsequent films: the crime thriller Memories of Murder (2003), the monster film The Host (2006), the science fiction action film Snowpiercer (2013), which served as Bong's English-language debut, and the dark comedy thriller Parasite (2019). The latter three are also among the highest-grossing films in South Korea, with Parasite being the highest-grossing South Korean film in history.

All of Bong's films have been South Korean productions, although Snowpiercer, Okja (2017) and Mickey 17 (2025) are Hollywood co-productions with major use of the English language. Two of his films have screened in competition at the Cannes Film Festival—Okja in 2017 and Parasite in 2019; the latter earned the Palme d'Or, which was a first for a South Korean film. Bong won Academy Awards for Best Picture, Best Director, and Best Original Screenplay, making Parasite the first non-English language film to win Best Picture.

== Early life ==
Bong Joon Ho was born on September 14, 1969, in Bongheok-dong, Daegu, South Korea. He has three older siblings. His mother, Park So-young, was a housewife; his father, Bong Sang-gyun, was a graphic designer, industrial designer, professor of art at Yeungnam University, and head of the art department at the National Film Institute. His father retired from Seoul Institute of Technology as a professor of design in 2007 and died in 2017. Bong's maternal grandfather, Park Taewon, was an esteemed author during the Japanese colonial period, best known for his work A Day in the Life of Kubo the Novelist and his defection to North Korea in 1950. His older brother, Bong Joon-soo, is an English professor at the Seoul National University; his older sister, Bong Ji-hee, teaches fashion styling at Anyang University. Bong Joon Ho was raised as a Catholic, and his Christian name is Michael.

While Bong was in elementary school, the family relocated to Seoul, taking up residence in Jamsil-dong by the Han River. He later attended Jamsil High School, and lived in an apartment near the Jamsil Bridge at that time. One day, while at the apartment preparing for his college entrance exam during his third year at the high school (in 1987), Bong was reportedly startled by seeing out the window what he believed to be a monster crawling up a pillar of the Jamsil Bridge and then falling into the Han River. He was already desiring to become a film director at that point in time and vowed to make a movie about a large creature living around the river someday. 19 years later, he fulfilled his dream when his monster movie The Host (2006) was released.

In 1988, Bong enrolled in Yonsei University, majoring in sociology. He also studied the English language while in college, and he credits Spike Lee's films with teaching him English profanity. College campuses such as Yonsei's were then hotbeds for the South Korean democracy movement; Bong was an active participant of student demonstrations, frequently subjected to tear gas early in his college years. He served a two-year term in the military in accordance with South Korea's compulsory military service before returning to college in 1992. Bong later co-founded a film club named "Yellow Door" with students from neighboring universities. As a member of the club, Bong made his first films, including a stop motion short titled Looking for Paradise and 16 mm film short titled Baeksaekin (White Man). He graduated from Yonsei University in 1995.

== Career ==
=== 1994–2005: Early work and feature debut ===
After graduating from university, Bong enrolled in the two-year program at the Korean Academy of Film Arts. While there, he made many 16 mm short films. His graduation films, Incoherence and Memories in My Frame, were invited to screen at the Hong Kong International Film Festival and Vancouver International Film Festival. Bong also collaborated on several works with his classmates, which included working as cinematographer on the highly acclaimed short 2001 Imagine (1994), directed by his friend Jang Joon-hwan. Aside from cinematography, Bong was also a lighting technician on two shorts—The Love of a Grape Seed and Sounds From Heaven and Earth—in 1994. He was credited as a screenwriter on the anthology film Seven Reasons Why Beer is Better Than a Lover (1996); both screenplay and assistant director credits on Park Ki-yong's debut Motel Cactus (1997); and is one of four writers (along with Jang Joon-hwan) credited for the screenplay of Phantom: The Submarine (1999).

In 1999, Bong began shooting his first feature Barking Dogs Never Bite (released in 2000) under producer Cha Seung-jae, who had overseen the production of both Motel Cactus and Phantom: The Submarine. The film, about a low-ranking university lecturer who abducts a neighbor's dog, was shot in the same apartment complex where Bong lived after his marriage. At the time of its release in February 2000, it received little commercial interest but some positive critical reviews. It was invited to the competition section of Spain's San Sebastián International Film Festival, and won awards at the Slamdance Film Festival and Hong Kong International Film Festival. Slowly building international word of mouth also helped the film financially; over two years after its local release, the film reached its financial break-even point due to sales to overseas territories.

Bong's second film, Memories of Murder (2003), a much larger project, was adapted from a stage play centered on a real-life serial killer who terrorized a rural town in the 1980s. Production of the film was a difficult process (the film set a local record for the number of locations it used). It was released in April 2003 and proved a critical and popular success. Word of mouth drove the film to sell over five million tickets (rescuing Cha Seung-jae's production company Sidus from near-bankruptcy), and a string of national honors followed, including Best Picture, Best Director, Best Actor (for Song Kang-Ho) and Best Lighting prizes at the Grand Bell Awards in 2003. Although passed over by the Cannes Film Festival and Venice Film Festival, the film eventually received its international premiere, again at the San Sebastián International Film Festival, where it picked up three awards including Best Director. The film also received an unusually strong critical reception on its release in foreign territories, such as France and the U.S.

Following this, Bong took some time to contribute short films to two anthology film projects. Influenza (2004) is a 30-minute work acted out entirely in front of real CCTV cameras stationed throughout Seoul. The film, which charts a desperate man's turn to violent crime over the space of five years, was commissioned by the Jeonju International Film Festival, together with works by Japanese director Sogo Ishii and Hong Kong-based Yu Lik-wai. Twentidentity, meanwhile, is a 20-part anthology film made by alumni of the Korean Academy of Film Arts, on the occasion of the school's 20th anniversary. Bong's contribution is Sink & Rise (2003), a work set alongside the Han River.

=== 2006–2012: International success ===
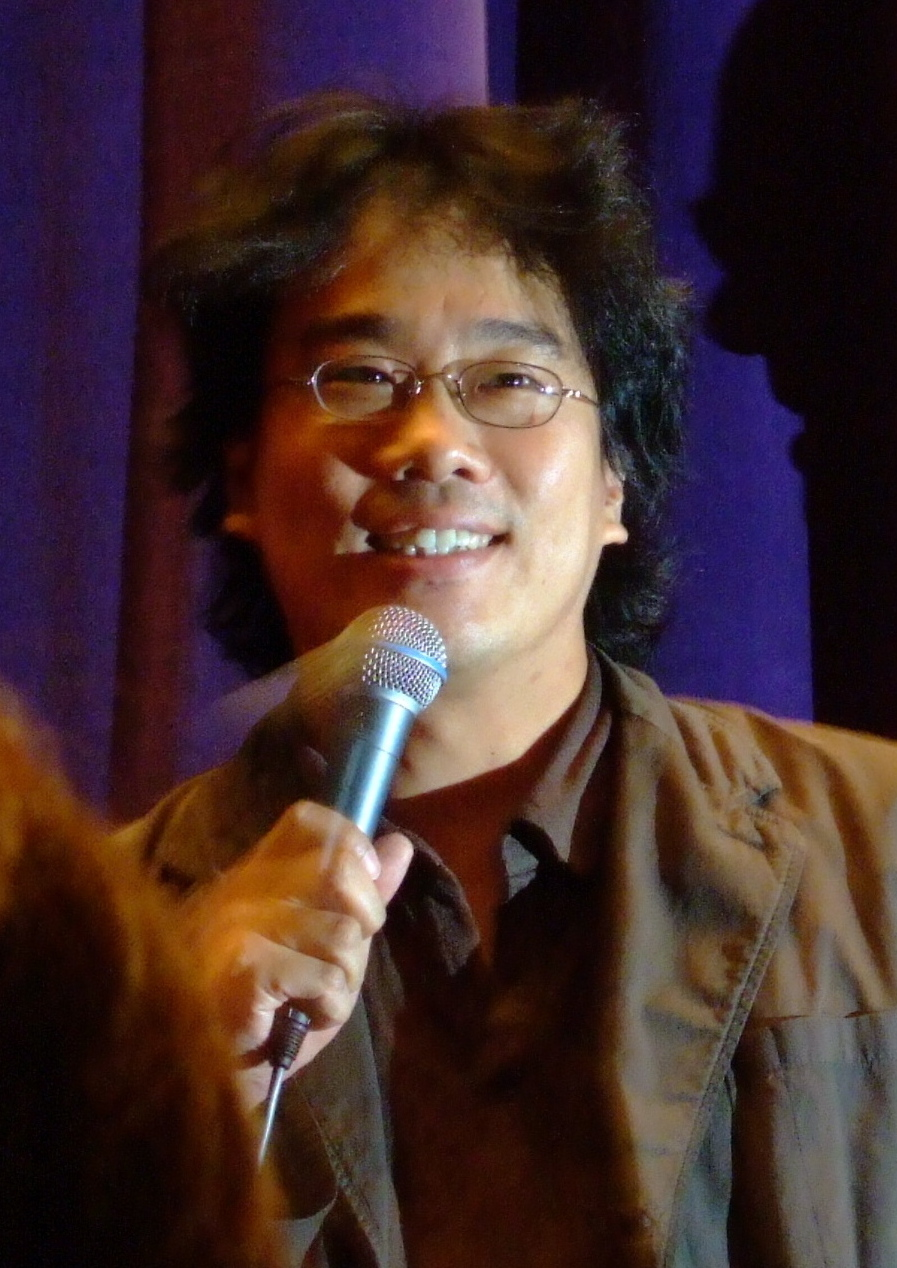
Bong at a Q&A session for The Host in September 2006.

The Host (2006) marked a step up in scale in Bong's career, and for the Korean film industry as a whole. The big-budget ($11 million) work centered on a fictional monster that rises up out of the Han River to wreak havoc on the people of Seoul—and on one family in particular. Featuring many of the actors who had appeared in his previous films, the film was the focus of strong audience interest even before it started shooting, but there were many doubts raised about whether a Korean production could rise to the challenge of creating a full-fledged, believable digital monster. After initially contacting New Zealand's Weta Digital—the company responsible for the CGI in The Lord of the Rings—scheduling conflicts led Bong to San Francisco-based The Orphanage, who took on the majority of the effects work. After rushing to meet deadlines, the film received a rapturous premiere in the Directors' Fortnight section of the 2006 Cannes Film Festival. Although local audiences were slightly more critical of The Host than attendees at Cannes, the film was nonetheless a major summer hit. With theater owners calling for more and more prints, the film enjoyed South Korea's widest release ever (on over a third of the nation's 1,800 screens) and set a new box office record with 13 million tickets sold. The Host was bought by US studio Universal for the remake rights. The administrations of Lee Myung-bak and Park Geun-hye later deemed The Host promoted leftist viewpoints, and included Bong on a leftist blacklist.

Bong, along with French film directors Michel Gondry and Leos Carax, directed a segment of Tokyo! (2008), a triptych feature telling three separate tales of the city. Bong's segment is about a man who has lived for a decade as a Hikikomori—the term used in Japan for people unable to adjust to society who do not leave their homes—and what happens when he falls in love with a pizza delivery girl. Bong's fourth feature film Mother (2009) is the story of a doting mother who struggles to save her disabled son from a murder accusation. It premiered in the Un Certain Regard section at the 2009 Cannes Film Festival to much acclaim, particularly for actress Kim Hye-ja; she went on to win the Los Angeles Film Critics Association Award for Best Actress. Mother repeated its critical success nationally and in the international film festival circuit. The film appeared on many film critics' "best-of" lists of 2010. In 2011, Bong contributed to 3.11 A Sense of Home Films, another anthology film, addressing the theme of home. The films were made by 21 filmmakers in response to the devastating earthquake and tsunami which hit the Tohoku region of Japan on March 11, 2011. The film screened on the first anniversary of the disaster. In Bong's short film Iki, a teenage girl finds a toddler, seemingly dead, on a beach. That same year, Bong served as a jury member for the 27th Sundance Film Festival. He was also the head of the jury for the Caméra d'Or section of the 2011 Cannes Film Festival and 2013 Edinburgh International Film Festival.

=== 2013–2018: American co-productions ===
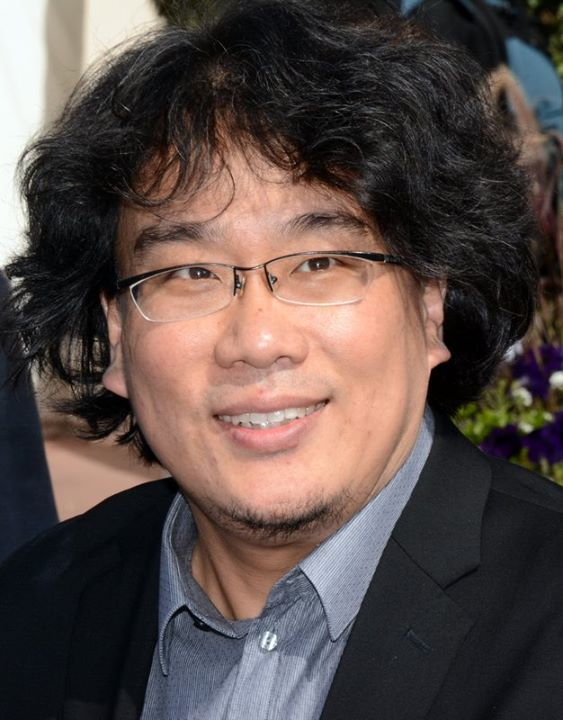
Bong at the 2013 Deauville American Film Festival

Bong's first English-language film, Snowpiercer, was released in 2013. It is based on the graphic novel Le Transperceneige (1982) by Jacques Lob and Jean-Marc Rochette, and set largely on a futuristic train where those on board are separated according to their social status. The film premiered at Times Square on July 29, 2013, in Seoul, before screening at the 2013 Deauville American Film Festival as the closing film on September 7, 2013, the 64th Berlin International Film Festival as part of Berlin's Forum Sidebar on February 7, 2014, opening the LA Film Festival on June 11, 2014, and the Edinburgh International Film Festival on June 22, 2014. Upon release in cinemas, Snowpiercer was met with near universal praise and strong ticket sales in South Korea and abroad. As of April 2014, it is the tenth highest-grossing domestic film in South Korea, with 9,350,141 admissions. The film also holds the domestic record for the fastest movie (domestic and foreign) to reach four million admissions, which it achieved five days after the premiere, and another record for the highest weekend figure (from Friday to Sunday) for a Korean film, with 2.26 million viewers. In addition to receiving several awards and nominations, Snowpiercer appeared on several critics' lists of the ten best films of 2014.

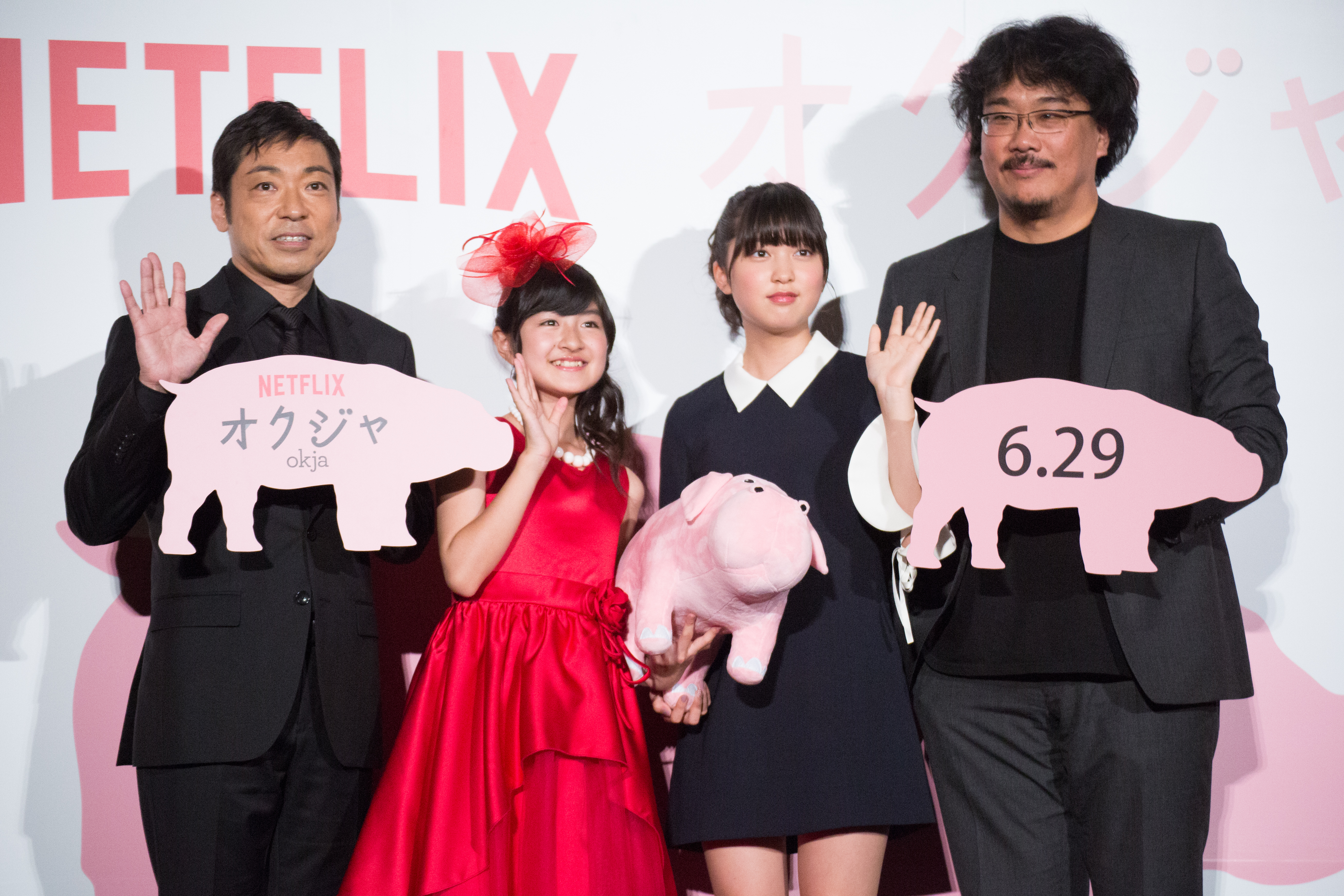
Bong (far right) at the Japanese premiere of Okja (2017).

In 2015, Bong's next film, Okja, was announced. On April 30, 2015, screenwriter Jon Ronson announced on his Twitter account that he was writing the second draft of Bong's screenplay for the film. Darius Khondji joined the film as cinematographer in February 2016. Filming began in April 2016. Okja premiered at the 2017 Cannes Film Festival, where it competed for the Palme d'Or and sparked controversy for being produced by Netflix. The film was met with boos mixed with applause during a press screening at the festival, when the Netflix logo appeared on screen and again during a technical glitch; the film was projected in the incorrect aspect ratio for its first seven minutes. The festival later apologized to the filmmakers. But the film received a four-minute standing ovation after its actual premiere. It was released on Netflix on June 28, 2017, and received positive reviews. New York Times critic A. O. Scott wrote: "Okja is a miracle of imagination and technique, and Okja insists, with abundant mischief and absolute sincerity, that she possesses a soul."

=== 2019–present: Parasite and Mickey 17 ===
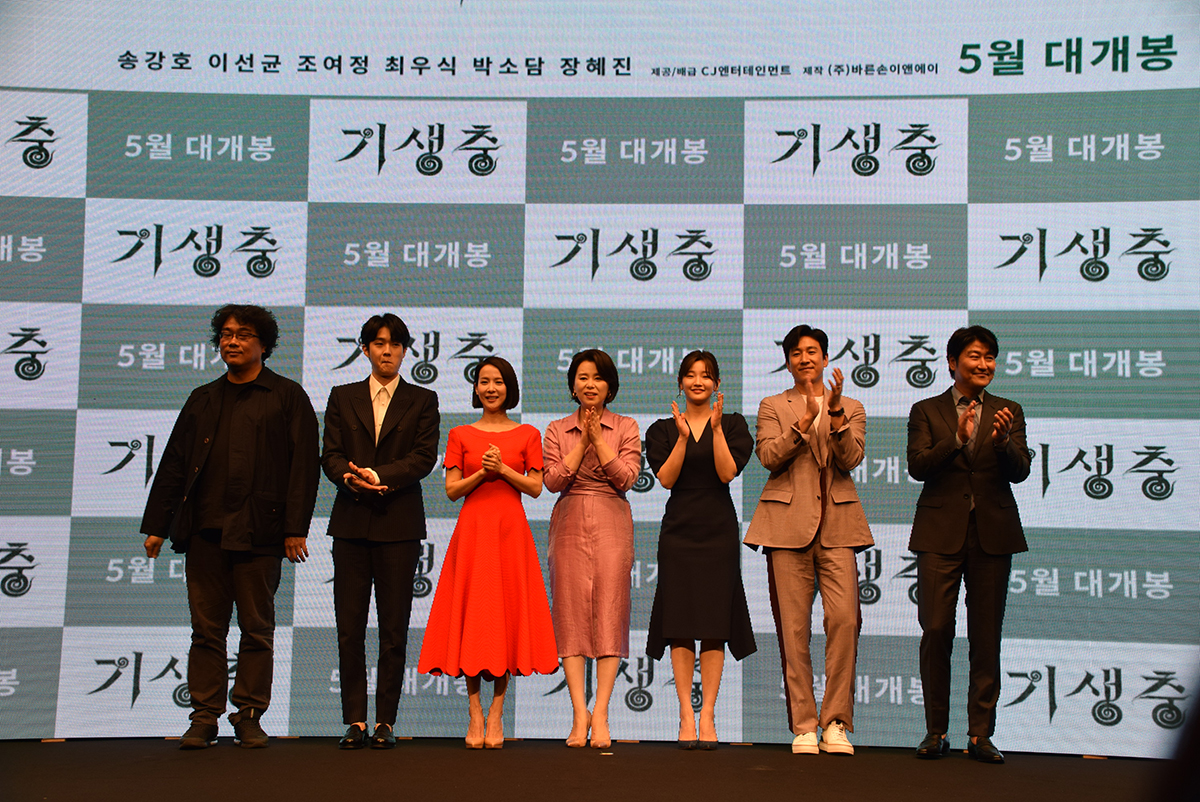
Bong and stars at a 2019 press event for Parasite.

In 2019, Bong directed the South Korean film Parasite, a dark comedy thriller about a poor family that infiltrates a wealthy household by gaining employment as unrelated staff members. The film premiered at the 2019 Cannes Film Festival, where it won the Palme d'Or, becoming the first Korean film to receive the award and the first film to do so with a unanimous vote since Blue Is the Warmest Colour at the 2013 Cannes Film Festival. On June 16, 2019, the film won the $60,000 Sydney Film Prize at the Sydney Film Festival where it was in competition alongside 11 features from countries such as North Macedonia, Brazil and Spain, and Australian entrants Mirrah Foulkes (for Judy and Punch) and Ben Lawrence (for Hearts and Bones).

Parasite was released in South Korea by CJ Entertainment on May 30, 2019, and in the United States by Neon on October 11, 2019. It received unanimous critical acclaim and earned $266 million at the worldwide box office, becoming Bong's highest-grossing release. Regarding motivation of the film's creation, Bong hoped that he would live a comfortable life, however he was disappointed several times in reality. He wanted to express the anxiety, sadness, and deep fear that came from reality of life via his film.

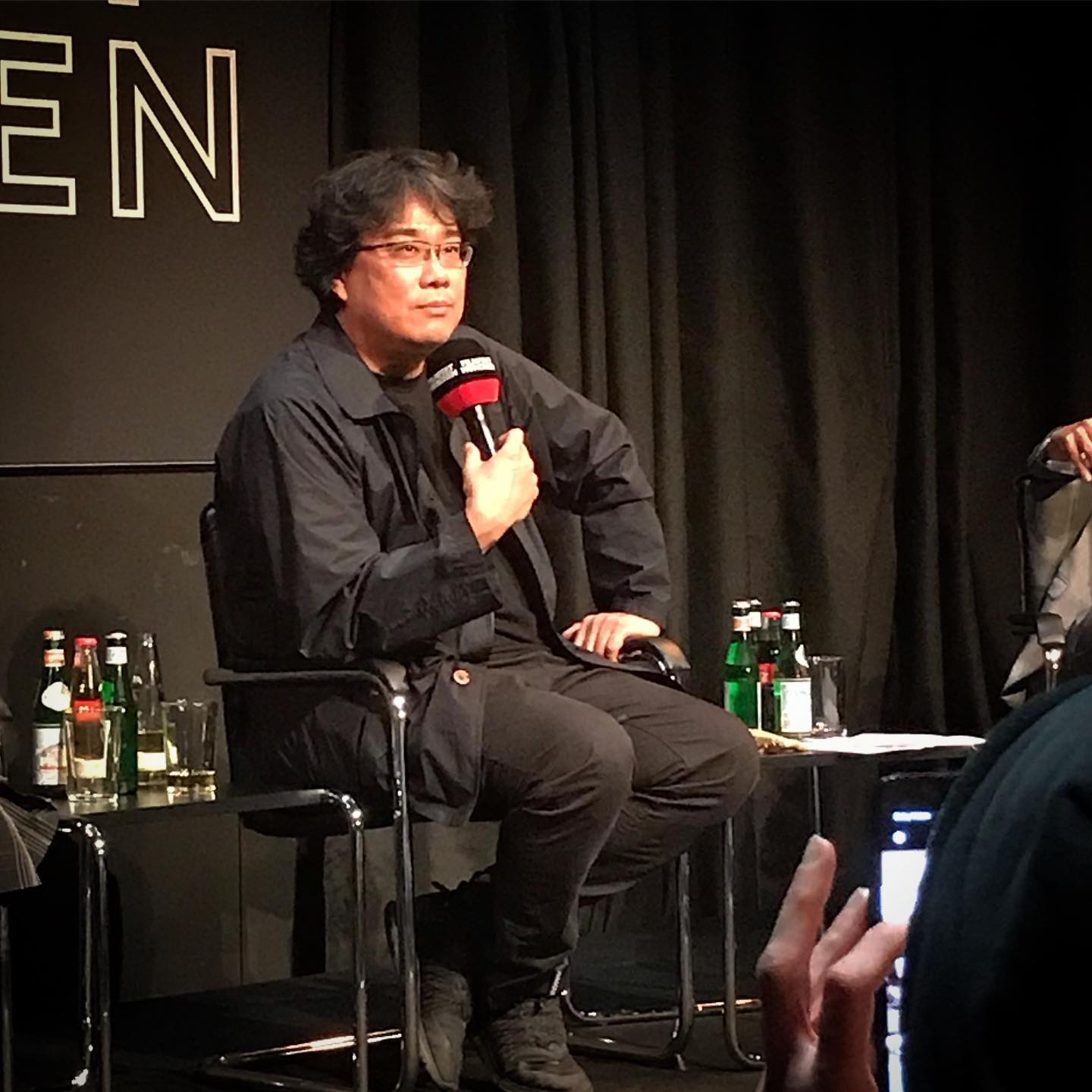
Bong at the Munich International Film Festival in July 2019

Throughout the 2019–2020 film awards season, Bong and the film received numerous accolades. Bong received the Hollywood Filmmaker Award at the 23rd Hollywood Film Awards and Critics' Choice Movie Award for Best Director (tied with Sam Mendes for 1917) at the 25th Critics' Choice Awards. He was also nominated for Best Director and Best Screenplay (shared with Han Jin-won) at the 77th Golden Globe Awards, with the film itself winning Best Foreign Language Film. This was the first Golden Globe Award nomination (and win) for any South Korean film. Parasite also became the first non-English-language film to win the top prize at the 70th American Cinema Editors Eddie Awards when film editor Yang Jin-mo won Best Edited Feature Film – Dramatic. At the 26th Screen Actors Guild Awards, the cast of Parasite won the Screen Actors Guild Award for Outstanding Performance by a Cast in a Motion Picture, making history as the first foreign-language film to win in the category. At the 73rd British Academy Film Awards, Parasite was nominated in four categories, winning two awards—Best Original Screenplay and Best Film Not in the English Language.

Parasite was later submitted as the South Korean entry for Best International Feature Film for the 92nd Academy Awards, making the December shortlist. It eventually became the first South Korean film to receive an Academy Award nomination in any category, receiving a total of six nominations and winning four awards—Best Picture, Best Director, Best Original Screenplay, and Best International Feature Film. This was also the first time a non-English language film won the Academy Award for Best Picture and the first time Asian writers won Academy Awards for screenwriting. While accepting the Academy Award for Best Director, Bong expressed his deep respect and appreciation for fellow nominees Martin Scorsese, who inspired his work, and Quentin Tarantino, who supported and praised his earlier films. He also mentioned a quote from Scorsese—"The most personal is the most creative"—that also inspired him, which prompted the audience to give Scorsese an enthusiastic standing ovation. Scorsese later wrote and sent a heartfelt letter to Bong after Parasite's Oscar success. Parasite's Best Picture win was well received by film critics, who hailed it as a major step forward for popular appreciation of international film and for restoring the legitimacy of the academy. "The academy gave best picture to the actual best picture", wrote Justin Chang of the Los Angeles Times, who continued that the film awards body was "startled ... into recognizing that no country's cinema has a monopoly on greatness". Conversely, U.S. president Donald Trump lambasted Parasite's win at a campaign rally in Colorado on February 20, 2020, questioning why a foreign film won Best Picture. Distribution company Neon responded by tweeting: "Understandable, he can't read."

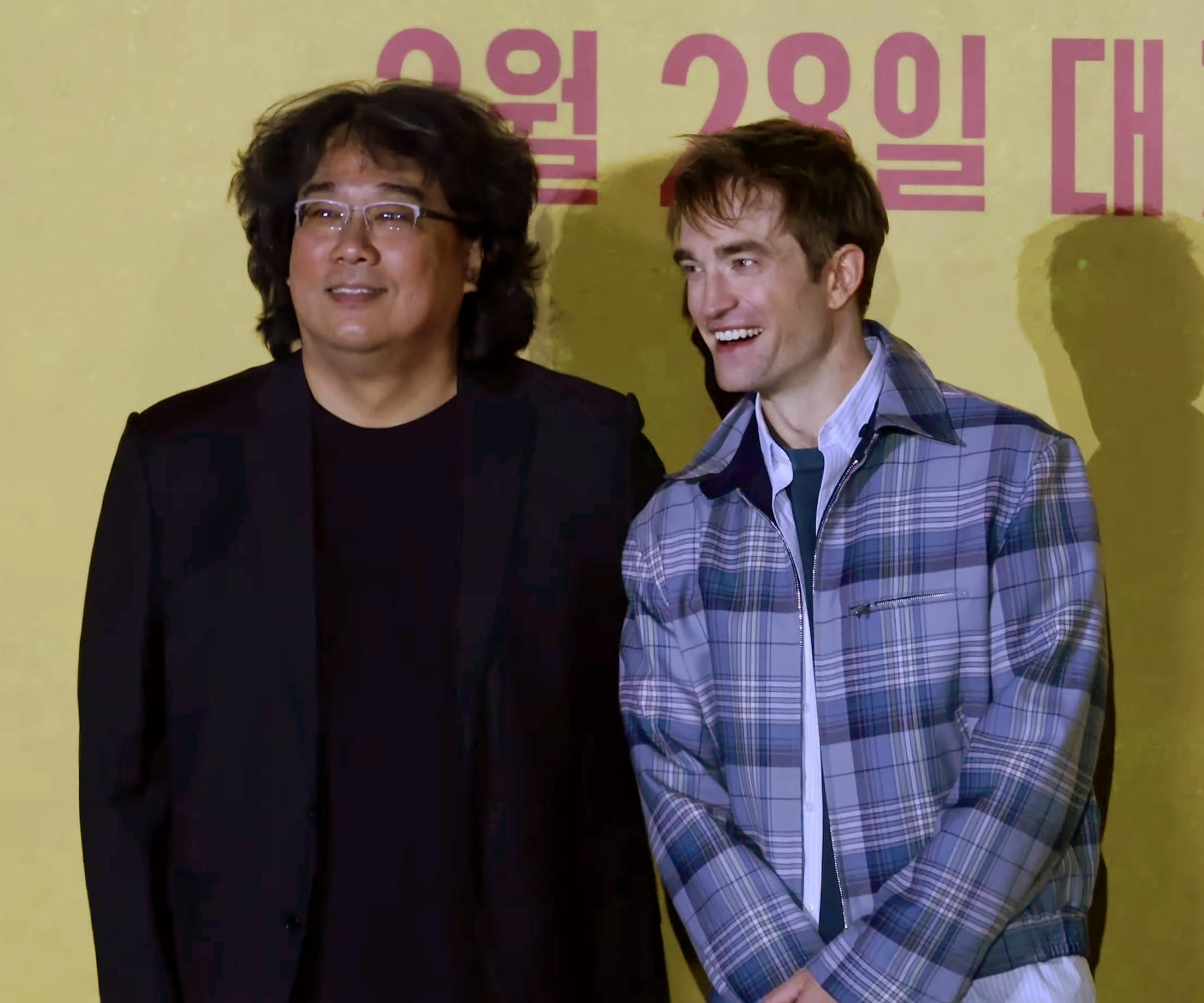
Bong with Robert Pattinson in South Korea in 2025

In January 2020, an HBO six-hour limited series based on the film, with Bong and Adam McKay serving as executive producers, currently in early development, was announced as an upcoming project. Bong has stated that the series, also titled Parasite, will explore stories "that happen in between the sequences in the film". In February 2020, Mark Ruffalo was rumored to star while Tilda Swinton was confirmed to being cast as the female lead. Swinton left the project in October 2022 and Bong confirmed in February 2025 that the series was still in development.

In September 2021, Bong served as jury president of the 78th Venice International Film Festival. In January 2022, it was revealed Bong's next film would be Mickey 17, an adaptation of Edward Ashton's novel Mickey7. Bong was given an advance manuscript of the novel in late 2021. The film, which was written, co-produced and directed by Bong, is being distributed by Warner Bros. Pictures and stars Robert Pattinson, Bong's first collaborations with both. In May 2022, Naomi Ackie, Toni Collette, and Mark Ruffalo joined the cast and the film entered into pre-production at Warner Bros. Studios, Leavesden. In July 2022, Steven Yeun joined the cast. Production commenced on August 1, 2022. Mickey 17 premiered at the 75th Berlin International Film Festival on February 15, 2025, before being theatrically released by Warner Bros. Pictures in South Korea on February 28, and in the United States on March 7, 2025.

==== Upcoming projects ====
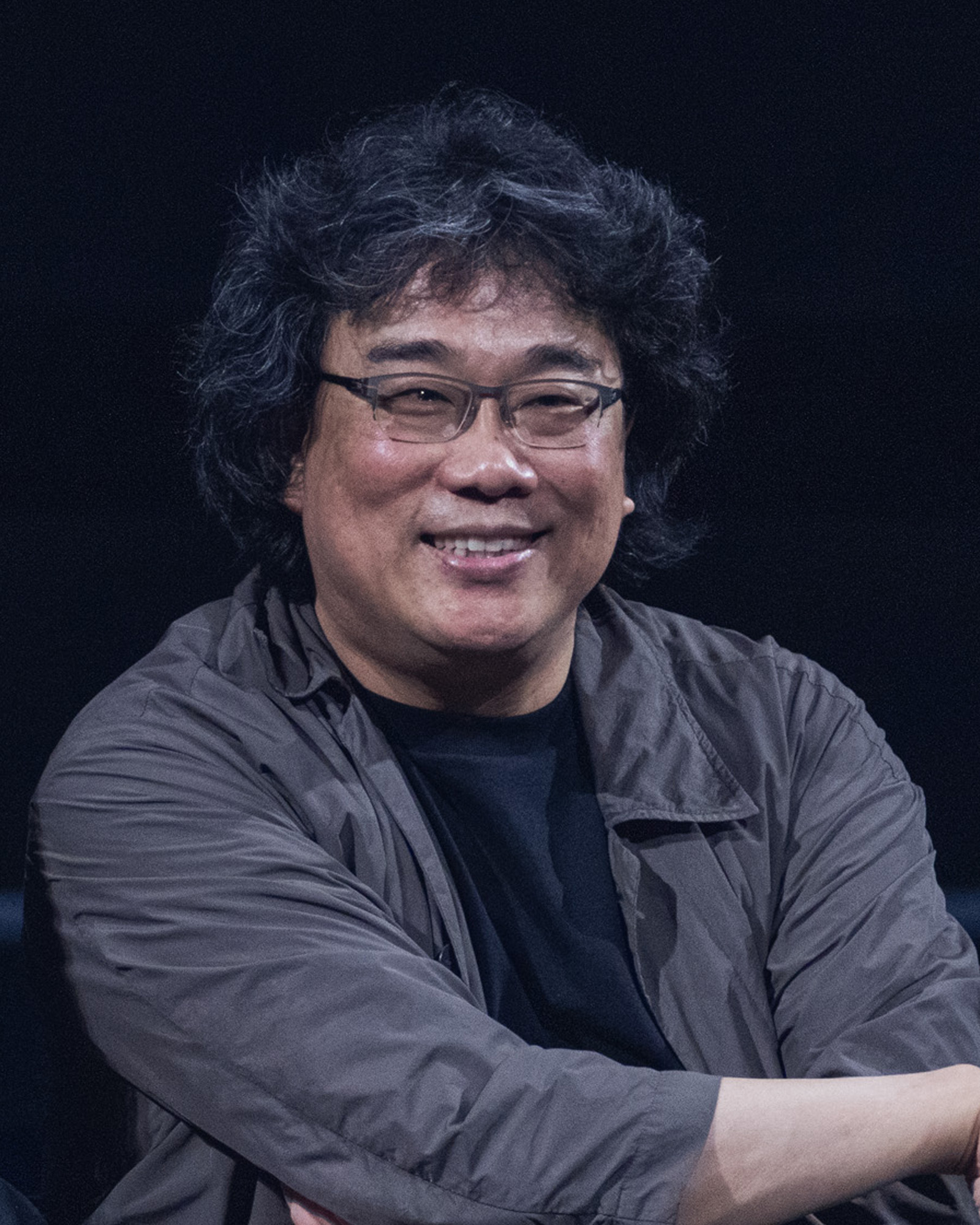
Bong in 2025

In February 2021, Bong said that he had been working on two scripts after completing Parasite, one in English and one in Korean, and that he had finished one of them. He said that the Korean film "is located in Seoul and has unique elements of horror and action" and that the English film is "a drama film based on a true event that happened in 2016." Bong is also working on a Korean animated film, tentatively titled Ally, which was conceived in 2018 and focuses on deep-sea creatures and humans. In 2024, Bong confirmed that both the animated film and the Seoul horror film remained in development and expressed interest in making a biographical film about a historical figure after being inspired by Harbin.

== Inspirations and style ==
As a child, Bong watched Black Orpheus (1959) on Korean television, which made a big impact on him. While he was in film school, Bong watched the Qatsi trilogy (1982–2002). His main inspirations are from Guillermo del Toro—his favorite films of del Toro's are The Devil's Backbone (2001) and Pan's Labyrinth (2006)—and Nagisa Ōshima, describing Oshima as "one of the most controversial masters". Bong also studied the films of Martin Scorsese and cited him as one of his major influences during his acceptance speech for the Academy Award for Best Director when he won for Parasite (2019). Bong called manga artist Naoki Urasawa "the greatest storyteller of our time" and cited his stories and the way he develops scenes as an influence.

The most defining trademark of Bong's films are their sudden tone shifts (sometimes within scenes) between drama, darkness, and black or slapstick humor. During a TIFF Master Class at the 2017 Toronto International Film Festival, Bong claimed: "I'm never really conscious of the tone shifts or the comedy that I apply, I never think 'oh, the tone shifts at this point or it's funny at this point.' I'm never conscious of it during the filmmaking or screenwriting process." Bong also uses real filming locations or specially built sets in all his films as opposed to green screens, even to the extent of filming in Seoul's sewers for The Host (2006); Memories of Murder (2003) set a local record for the number of locations it used. His process when working with actors is to make them feel comfortable and gives them a high amount of freedom when performing, even allowing them to improvise. Bong has commented that he doesn't like the term 'Directing Actors' as he feels that "acting is the actor's job and it's something I don't feel like I can direct".

In an interview promoting Snowpiercer (2013), actor Ed Harris described Bong's shooting process as "cutting while filming". Harris also said that "if I was doing a scene and it was a couple of pages long, he would never shoot the whole thing one way. He'd shoot a few lines, like the first beat of the scene, and then he would turn the camera around and get my part for that part of the scene. Then he would change the angle a little bit". He additionally noted that "the editor was sitting right there on the stage, right below the set with a big tent, actually getting the footage as they were filming. Fellow actor Daniel Henshall echoed Harris's sentiment calling Bong "precise" and "very sure of what he wants". Henshall continued by saying: "He only shoots what he's going to use in the edit. Doesn't do any coverage. I've never worked like that before. You're trimming the fat before you've shot it, which is very brave, because when you get into the edit, if something's missing you haven't got it. He's been planning it for four years that meticulously."

In 2015, Bong's list of 50 inspirational films was published on the French streaming platform LaCinetek. His list includes three works by Martin Scorsese (Mean Streets, Raging Bull, Goodfellas) and two films each by Nagisa Ōshima, Shōhei Imamura, Kim Ki-young, Alfred Hitchcock, François Truffaut, Federico Fellini, John Carpenter, David Lynch, Akira Kurosawa and Stanley Kubrick.

== Personal life ==
Bong married screenwriter Jung Sun-young in 1995. They have a son together, Bong Hyo-min, who is also a filmmaker. In 2009, Bong had a tattoo of a bird done on his left arm to celebrate the release of Mother, and pay homage to a scene in the film.

Bong was a member and supporter of the now-defunct Democratic Labor Party during the 2000s, reportedly starting in June 2003. He left the Democratic Labor Party in March 2008 and joined its successor, the New Progressive Party, the following month. He later voted for the latter party in the 2012 South Korean presidential election. On December 7, 2024, he was among approximately 2,520 employees of the South Korean film industry who called for a successful impeachment and arrest of President Yoon Suk Yeol due to his declaration of martial law during the 2024 South Korean martial law crisis.

== Filmography ==
Directed features

- Barking Dogs Never Bite (2000)
- Memories of Murder (2003)
- The Host (2006)
- Mother (2009)
- Snowpiercer (2013)
- Okja (2017)
- Parasite (2019)
- Mickey 17 (2025)
- Ally (2027)

== Recurring collaborators ==
Work Actor	2000	2003	2006	2009	2013	2017	2019	2025
Work Actor	Barking Dogs Never Bite	Memories of Murder	The Host	Mother	Snowpiercer	Okja	Parasite	Mickey 17
Byun Hee-bong†								
Kim Roi-ha								
Seong Jeong-seon								
Bae Doona								
Go Soo-hee								
Kim Jin-goo								
Kwon Byung-gil†								
Yu In-su								
Song Kang-ho								
Lee Dong-yong								
Choi Gyo-sik								
Jo Deok-jae								
Kwon Hyeok-poong								
Lee Jae-eung								
Park Hae-il								
Park Jin-woo								
Park No-shik								
Shin Hyun-jong								
Son Jin-hwan								
Yoo Seung-mok								
Jeon Mi-seon†								
Jo Moon-eui								
Lee Dae-hyeon								
Lee Ok-joo								
Yoon Je-moon								
Min Kyung-jin								
Go Ah-sung								
Paul Lazar								
Park Jeong-gi								
Lee Jung-eun								
Tilda Swinton								
Steve Park								
Ahn Seong-bong								
Choi Woo-shik								
Andreas Fronk								
Park Keun-rok								
Daniel Henshall								
Steven Yeun								

== See also ==
- Cinema of Korea
