= Byun Hee-bong =

South Korean actor (1942–2023)

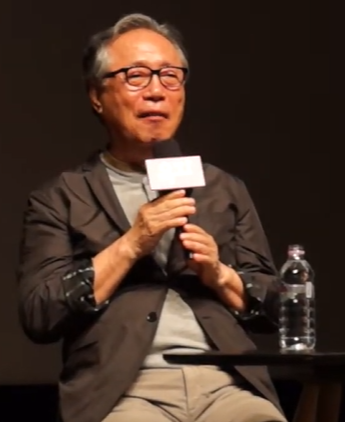
- Byun in July 2017
- Born: Byun In-chul; 8 June 1942; Jangseong County, Zenranan-dō, Korea, Empire of Japan (now South Jeolla Province, South Korea)
- Died: 18 September 2023 (aged 81); Seoul, South Korea
- Occupation: Actor
- Years active: 1970–2019
- Honours: Eungwan Order of Cultural Merit (2020)

Korean name
- Hangul: 변인철
- Hanja: 邊仁徹
- RR: Byeon Incheol
- MR: Pyŏn Inch'ŏl

Stage name
- Hangul: 변희봉
- Hanja: 邊希峰
- RR: Byeon Huibong
- MR: Pyŏn Hŭibong

Byun Hee-bong (Korean: 변희봉; born Byun In-chul; 8 June 1942 – 18 September 2023) was a South Korean film, television and voice actor. In 1963, he embarked on his voice acting career by making his debut in the first season of DBS Donga Broadcasting. He further expanded his experience by joining the second season of MBC Culture Broadcasting in 1965.

Making his acting debut in 1970, he was known as director Bong Joon-ho's personal favorite actor, and his performances in the director's films have sparked a fresh wave of recognition for his unique contributions as a supporting actor. He appeared in four of Bong Joon-ho's feature films. In Barking Dogs Never Bite, he portrayed a peculiar apartment security guard with a deep affinity for bone soup. In Memories of Murder, he took on the role of a local detective chief, while in The Host, he captivated audiences as Park Hee-bong, the grandfather of the film's protagonist's family. For this role, Byun also won several awards, including the 27th Blue Dragon Film Awards for best supporting actor. In Okja, Byun made a special appearance as Joo Hee-bong.

== Early life ==
Byun In-chul was born in Sinchang Village, Sinpyeong-ri, Buk-myeon, Jangseong County, South Jeolla Province.

He attended Salesian High School in Gwangju. He took up law at Chosun University before dropping out to pursue acting.

== Career ==
Byun entered the MBC actor's auditions in 1965, and made his acting debut in 1970. A year later in 1971, he became a regular on the landmark police procedural Chief Inspector. At the time of his debut, he used his real name, Byeon In-cheol, but in 1977, in an attempt to improve his image as a villain, he used the stage name Byun Hee-bong.

Throughout the 1970s, he became known on TV as a character actor who played eccentric men who didn't quite fit in with mainstream Korean society. He transitioned to the big screen in the 1980s, and earlier in his film career, starred in the classic Lee Doo-yong film Eunuch (1986) and A Surrogate Father (1993).

In 2000, Byun appeared in a memorable supporting role in Bong Joon-ho's directorial debut Barking Dogs Never Bite, playing a bizarre apartment maintenance man with a love for dog meat. It rejuvenated his career, and Bong would later cast him in the short film Sink & Rise (2004), and his seminal works crime drama Memories of Murder (2003) and monster movie The Host (2006). The Host became the top-grossing Korean film of all time, and Byun won much acclaim for his performance as the strong-willed patriarch of a "loser" family, including Best Supporting Actor awards at the Asia Pacific Film Festival and Blue Dragon Film Awards.

Among Byun's other notable roles were in martial arts fantasy Volcano High (2001), rural dramedy My Teacher, Mr. Kim (2003), horror comedy To Catch a Virgin Ghost (2004), body swap thriller The Devil's Game (2008), and espionage film The Spies (2012). Byun was also known for being active in television, with his portrayals of endearing, humorous fathers/grandfathers, or stern, cunning professionals.

== Death ==
Byun died from complications of pancreatic cancer in Seoul on 18 September 2023, at the age of 81.

== Filmography ==
=== Film ===
Year	Title	Role	Ref.
1980	Dull Servant Pal Bul-chul		
1983	Hotel at 00:00	Reporter Kim	
1985	A Man With Color		
1986	Eunuch		
1986	No Woman Is Afraid of the Night	Deok Sa-gong	
1988	We Are Going to Geneva Now	Countryside doctor	
1988	Karma		
1988	The World of Women	Professor Park	
1992	A Surrogate Father		
2000	Barking Dogs Never Bite	Byun Byeong-bi	
2001	Volcano High	Vice principal Jang Hak-sa	
2003	Scent of Love	Second-hand bookstore owner	
2003	My Teacher, Mr. Kim	Choi No-in	
2003	Memories of Murder	Sergent Koo Hee-bong	
2003	Spring Breeze	Writer Noh	
2004	Au Revoir, UFO	Real estate agent	
2004	To Catch a Virgin Ghost		
2004	Lovely Rivals	Principal Byun In-chul	
2004	Sink & Rise (short film)		
2005	Another Public Enemy	Byun Hee-bong	
2005	Crying Fist	Sang-hwan's coach	
2005	Detective Mr. Gong	Gong Pil-doo's father	
2006	The Host	Park Hee-bong	
2006	Mission Sex Control	Mr. Kang	
2007	Small Town Rivals	CEO Baek	
2008	The Devil's Game	Kang No-shik	
2009	Lifting King Kong	school superintendent	
2009	Searching for the Elephant	zoo official (cameo)	
2010	Haunters	Jung-shik	
2011	In Love and War	Village leader	
2012	I Am the King	Shin Ik-yeok	
2012	The Spies	Adviser Yoon	
2013	Mr. Go	Weiwei's grandfather (cameo)	
2017	Okja	Hee-bong	
2019	By Quantum Physics: A Nightlife Venture	Baek Young-Kam	

=== Television ===
Television series appearances
Year	Title		Role	Ref.
Year	English	Korean	Role	Ref.
1970	101 Hong Kong	홍콩 101번지	bit part	
1971	Chief Inspector	수사반장	bit part	
1973	113 Investigation Division	113 수사본부	bit part	
1976	Wealthy Merchant Im Sang-ok	거상 임상옥	bit part	
1978	Government	정부인	bit part	
1979	Season of Love	사랑의 계절	bit part	
1979	Last Witness	최후의 증인	bit part	
1979	Anguk-dong Madam	안국동 아씨	bit part	
1980	The End of the Line	종점	bit part	
1980	Power Diary	전원일기	Various minor roles other than Hyeran's father	
1981	New Madam	새아씨		
1981	1st Republic	제1공화국	Ahn Jae-hong	
1982	Market People	시장사람들		
1983	Trade King Choi Bong-joon	무역왕 최봉준		
1983	Sunflower in Winter	겨울 해바라기		
1983	Five Hundred Years of the Joseon Dynasty – "The King of Chudong Palace"	조선왕조 오백년 – 추동궁 마마	Nam Eun	
1983	3840 Shortstop	3840 유격대		
1984	Five Hundred Years of the Joseon Dynasty – "The Ume Tree in the Midst of the Snow"	조선왕조 오백년 – 설중매	Yu Jagwang	
1984	Governor-General of Korea	조선총독부	Lee Wan-yong	
1984	Chusa Kim Jung-hee	추사 김정희		
1985	Wild Orchid	풍란 (드라마)	Yu Jagwang	
1985	White-haired Youth	백발의 청춘		
1985	The Season of Men	남자의 계절	Kim Joong-han	
1986	Five Hundred Years of the Joseon Dynasty – "Hoecheonmun"	조선왕조 오백년 – 회천문	Choe Myeong-gil	
1986	Five Hundred Years of the Joseon Dynasty – "Namhan Mountain Castle"	조선왕조 오백년 – 남한산성	Choe Myeong-gil	
1987	Beautiful Secret Love Affair	아름다운 밀회	President Jang	
1988	Three Women	세 여인		
1988	Five Hundred Years of the Joseon Dynasty – "The Memoirs of Lady Hyegyeong"	조선왕조 오백년 – 한중록	Park Mun-su	
1988	Our Town	우리 읍내	Nam Dae-chun	
1989	The 2nd Republic	제2공화국		
1989	The Fifth Row	제5열	Jo Geum-san	
1989	Legacy	유산	Lawyer Hwang	
1990	Daewongun	대원군 (1990년 드라마)	Hong Soon- mok	
1990	Anti-People Special Committee	반민특위 (드라마)	Choi Un- ha	
1990	The Handmaid and Gainae	머슴아와 가이내		
1991	Eyes of Dawn	여명의 눈동자	Park Choon-geum	
1991	Three Day Promise	3일의 약속		
1991	We're Middle Class	우리는 중산층	Patriarch Park	
1993	For The Poet	시인을 위하여		
1993	The 3rd Republic		Hyun Seok-ho	
1993	MBC Best Theater – "Soon-dal and Byung-gu and Ok-joo"		Byung-gu's father	
1993	Moonlight Hometown	달빛 고향		
1994	Close One Eye	한쪽 눈을 감아요		
1995	Relationship Is	인연이란		
1995	Seoul Nightsangok	서울 야상곡		
1995	Asphalt Man			
1995	Glorious Dawn		Heungseon Daewongun	
1996	Halt	간이역		
1996	Tears of the Dragon			
1997	Desire		Yoon-seok	
1997	Scamper	질주		
1998	Love and Success			
1998	The King's Path			
1998	Legend of Ambition			
1999	Hur Jun		Sung In-chul	
2000	Mokminsimseo		서용보	
2000	Secret		Chan-shik	
2000	Foolish Princes		Yeo Jae-man	
2002	The Dawn of the Empire		Kim Geun-ryul	
2002	Lovers		Gong Hee-bong (cameo)	
2003	Something About 1%		Lee Kyu-chul	
2003	Drama City – "The Truth About Wormwood and Garlic"	쑥과 마늘에 관한 진실	principal	
2003	Damo			
2004	Good Morning Confucius	굿모닝 공자	Go Dok-han	
2004	New Human Market		Oh Jong-doo	
2004	Choice			
2004	A Second Proposal			
2005	Green Rose		Prosecutor Jung	
2005	My Girl		Seol Woong	
2005	Drama City – "Gyeryongsan Buyong"	계룡산 부용이	Sabu	
2006	Great Inheritance		Jung Il-do	
2006	Wolf		Senator Yoon Gab-soo	
2007	Behind the White Tower		Oh Kyung-hwan	
2007	Witch Yoo Hee		Ma Yoon-hoon	
2009	My Too Perfect Sons		Song Shi-yeol	
2010	Master of Study		Cha Ki-bong	
2010	My Girlfriend Is a Gumiho		Cha Poong	
2010	The President		Go Sang-ryul	
2011	Glory Jane		Old man Hwang (cameo)	
2012	Ohlala Couple		Wolha, matchmaker of fate	
2013	Princess Aurora		Oh Dae-san	
2013	Goddess of Fire		Moon Sa-seung	
2014	Flower Grandpa Investigation Unit		Han Won-bin	
2014	Drama Festival – "Lump in My Life"		Pan-shik	
2014	Pinocchio		Choi Gong-pil	
2015	Save the Family		Jung Soo-bong	
2016	Madame Antoine: The Love Therapist		President Kim	
2016	Blow Breeze		Kim Deok-cheon	
2019	My Lawyer, Mr. Jo 2: Crime and Punishment		Kook Hyun-il	

== Theater ==
Year	Title		Role	Theater	Date	Ref.
Year	English	Korean	Role	Theater	Date	Ref.
2013	Snow of March	3월의 눈	Jang-oh	National Theatre Company Baek Sung-jang Min-ho Theatre	March 1–23	

== Awards and nominations ==
Year	Award	Category	Nominated work	Result	Ref.
1982	MBC Drama Awards			Won	
1985	Hankook Ilbo	Popularity Award	The Ume Tree in the Midst of the Snow	Won	
1985	21st Baeksang Arts Awards	Most Popular Actor (TV)	The Ume Tree in the Midst of the Snow	Won	
1986	JoongAng Ilbo	Our Star Award	The Ume Tree in the Midst of the Snow	Won	
2003	2nd Korean Film Awards	Best Supporting Actor	My Teacher, Mr. Kim	Nominated	
2004	KBS Drama Awards	Best Actor in a One-Act Drama/Special	My Teacher, Mr. Kim	Won	
2006	51st Asia Pacific Film Festival	Best Supporting Actor	The Host	Won	
2006	27th Blue Dragon Film Awards	Best Supporting Actor	The Host	Won	
2006	9th Director's Cut Awards	Performer of the Year (ensemble cast)	The Host	Won	
2007	43rd Baeksang Arts Awards	Best Actor (Film)	The Host	Nominated	
2007	44th Grand Bell Awards	Best Supporting Actor	The Host	Nominated	
2007	4th Best Film Awards	Best Supporting Actor	The Host	Won	
2008	44th Baeksang Arts Awards	Best Actor (Film)	The Devil's Game	Nominated	
2009	KMDb Choiwos Awards	Best Supporting Actor	The Devil's Game	Won	
2010	KBS Drama Awards	Best Supporting Actor	Master of Study	Nominated	
2014	MBC Drama Awards	Best Actor in a One-Act/Short Drama	Lump in My Life	Won	

=== State honors ===
List of State Honour(s)
State	Award Ceremony	Year	Honor	Ref.
South Korea	Korean Popular Culture and Arts Awards (Note: Since 2010 Honors are given at the Korean Popular Culture and Arts Awards, arranged by the Korea Creative Content Agency and hosted by the Ministry of Culture, Sports and Tourism.)	2020	Eungwan Order of Cultural Merit	
