= Kim Roi-ha =

South Korean actor

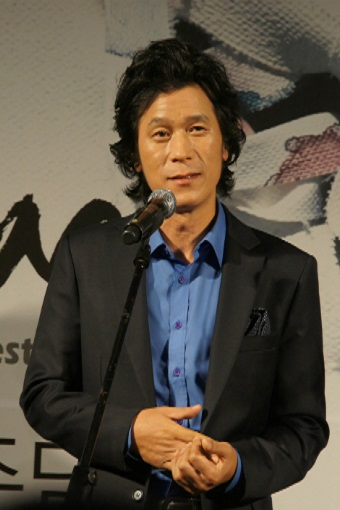
- Kim in 2013
- Born: November 15, 1965 (age 60); Gyeonggi Province, South Korea
- Other name: Kim Roe-ha
- Education: Dankook University - Ceramics
- Occupation: Actor
- Years active: 1994–present
- Spouse: Park Yoon-kyung (m. 2006)

Korean name
- Hangul: 김뢰하
- Hanja: 金雷夏
- RR: Gim Roeha
- MR: Kim Roeha

Kim Roi-ha (born November 15, 1965) is a South Korean actor. Notable roles include a detective in Memories of Murder (2003), and a gangster in A Bittersweet Life (2005).

Kim won Best Actor at the 2001 Dong-A Theatre Awards for his portrayal of Yeonsangun of Joseon in the stage play Yi. He reprised the role in 2010.

== Personal life ==
Kim married actress Park Yoon-kyung on September 10, 2006 at the Park Eul-bok Embroidery Museum in Ui-dong, Seoul.

== Filmography ==
=== Film ===
- No Parking (2025)
- Default (2018)
- The Stone (2014)
- Monster (2014)
- Doomsday Book (2012)
- Hindsight (2011)
- A Little Pond (2010)
- Where is Jung Seung-pil (2009)
- Dachimawa Lee (2008)
- Life Is Cool (2008) (cameo)
- Radio Dayz (2008)
- Wide Awake (2007)
- Magang Hotel (2007)
- The Host (2006)
- Detective Mr. Gong (2006)
- Forbidden Quest (2006)
- A Bittersweet Life (2005)
- Father and Son: The Story of Mencius (2004)
- Memories of Murder (2003)
- Save the Green Planet! (2003)
- H (2002)
- Yellow Flower (2002)
- Jungle Juice (2002)
- New Millenium Gymnastics (short film, 2001)
- Barking Dogs Never Bite (2000)
- Rainbow Trout (1999)
- Soul Guardians (1998)
- Whispering Corridors (1998)
- Incoherence (short film, 1994)
- Baeksekin (White Man) (short film, 1994)

=== Television series ===
- My Sweet Mobster (2024)
- Crime Puzzle (2021)
- The Road: The Tragedy of One (2021)
- Let Me Introduce Her (2018)
- Whisper (2017)
- Voice (2017)
- Shine or Go Crazy (2015)
- Inspiring Generation (2014)
- The King's Daughter, Soo Baek-hyang (2013-2014)
- Jeon Woo-chi (2012-2013)
- Drama Special "The Great Dipper" (2012)
- Lights and Shadows (2011-2012)
- Girl K (OCN, 2011)
- The Princess' Man (2011)
- Legend of the Patriots (2010)
- Swallow the Sun (2009)
- The Slingshot (2009)
- Hometown of Legends "Demon's Story" (2008)
- Iljimae (2008)
- How to Meet a Perfect Neighbor (2007)
- War of Money (2007)
- Lovers (2006)
- Special of My Life (2006)

=== Web series ===
- Big Bet (2022)
- Connect (2022)
- Kingdom: Ashin of the North (2021)

=== Variety shows ===
- Island Trio "Episode 8-11" (tvN, 2017)

== Theater ==
- Pumba (품바; 2013)
- When the Sun Rises (둥근 해가 떴습니다; 2012)
- A Story of Old Thieves (늘근도둑 이야기; 2011)
- The Tenant (임차인; at Yoon Young-sun Festival, 2008)
- Come and See Me (날 보러와요; 2003)
- Yi (이; 爾; 2001, 2010)

== Awards ==
- 2001 Dong-A Theatre Awards: Best Actor (Yi)
