= Memories of Murder =

2003 film by Bong Joon Ho

- Theatrical release poster
- Hangul: 살인의 추억
- Hanja: 殺人의 追憶
- RR: Sarinui chueok
- MR: Sarinŭi ch'uŏk
- Directed by: Bong Joon Ho
- Screenplay by: Bong Joon Ho; Shim Sung-bo
- Based on: Come to See Me by Kim Kwang-lim
- Produced by: Cha Seung-jae
- Starring: Song Kang-ho; Kim Sang-kyung
- Cinematography: Kim Hyung-koo
- Edited by: Kim Sun-min
- Music by: Taro Iwashiro
- Production companies: CJ Entertainment; Sidus Pictures
- Distributed by: CJ Entertainment
- Release date: May 2, 2003
- Running time: 131 minutes
- Country: South Korea
- Language: Korean
- Budget: US$2.8 million
- Box office: US$12 million

Memories of Murder (Korean: 살인의 추억) is a 2003 South Korean neo-noir crime thriller film directed by Bong Joon Ho, from a screenplay by Bong and Shim Sung-bo, and based on the 1996 play Come to See Me by Kim Kwang-lim. It stars Song Kang-ho and Kim Sang-kyung. In the film, detectives Park Doo-man (Song) and Seo Tae-yoon (Kim) lead an investigation into a string of rapes and murders taking place in Hwaseong in the late 1980s, by a man known as the Hwaseong Killer. The film is a semi-biographical retelling of Korea's police hunting Lee Choon-jae.

Development of the film was confirmed in September 2002, after CJ Entertainment purchased the rights to Kim's play, which is loosely based on South Korea's first confirmed serial murders. It is also inspired by detective fiction and elements of Bong's personal life. Principal photography took place across South Korea, including Jangseong County, Haenam County, and Jinju.

Memories of Murder was first released theatrically in South Korea on May 2, 2003, by CJ Entertainment. The film received critical acclaim, with praise for its screenplay, Bong's direction, the performances of its cast (particularly Song's), tone, and editing. It received numerous awards and nominations, and is widely considered one of the greatest films of the 21st century.

== Plot ==
In October 1986, two women are found raped and murdered on the outskirts of a small town. The local police department, inept and ill-equipped to deal with such a serious case, is quickly overwhelmed. Fabricating evidence and employing violent methods, detectives Park Doo-man and Cho Yong-koo coerce Baek Kwang-ho, a scarred and cognitively disabled young man, into a confession. Seo Tae-yoon, a detective from Seoul with more comprehensive training, determines that Baek is not capable of committing the crimes. After closely studying the reports, he discovers the decomposed remains of a third victim, and deduces that the killer struck on rainy nights and targeted women wearing red. Inspector Kwon Kwi-ok, the police force's under-appreciated female officer, observes that the same obscure song was requested on the local radio station on the night of each crime.

Despite a stakeout, on the next rainy night, the killer murders a woman near a gypsum mine. At the next stakeout, Park, Cho and Seo apprehend a miner masturbating near the crime scene, but his forced confession does not fit the details of the crime. Recalling a story told by two local schoolgirls, Seo investigates the school outhouses and finds the killer's only surviving victim, a traumatized woman living nearby. She divulges additional details, including the fact that the killer has soft hands. The killer strikes again soon after.

Park and Seo's investigation leads them to Hyeon-gyu, a clerk at the mine from whom the song requests originated. Seo notices that Hyeon-gyu has soft hands and moved to the town around the time of the first murder, but otherwise has no concrete evidence. Recalling Baek's forced confession, they realize that he was a witness to one of the murders. Park and Seo visit the restaurant run by Baek's father and encounter a drunken Cho, who has been suspended for attacking Hyeon-gyu. Angered by other patrons' mockery, Cho instigates a brawl. A panicked Baek runs out, stumbles in front of a passing train and is killed before Park and Seo can question him.

The coroner discovers semen in the latest victim, but as South Korea lacks the capability to conduct forensic DNA analysis, the police are forced to send the sample to the United States to compare it against Hyeon-gyu's. Meanwhile, an untreated wound in Cho's leg inflicted by Baek during the brawl develops tetanus, forcing it to be amputated.

On the next rainy night, Seo surveils Hyeon-gyu but dozes off and loses track of him, and a schoolgirl is murdered later. An enraged Seo attacks Hyeon-gyu the next day and attempts to force a confession at gunpoint, just as Park arrives with the results of the DNA test, which prove inconclusive. As Seo tries to shoot Hyeon-gyu, Park stops him and allows Hyeon-gyu to leave.

In 2003, Park is married with two children and works as a salesman. Passing by the first crime scene one day, he stops at the ditch where the victim was found. A young girl tells him she saw a man in the exact place, reminiscing about something he had done there a long time ago. When asked what the man looks like, she answers that he looks ordinary, so much to the point that he could blend into society. Shaken by the realization that the killer is still out there, and could be anyone easily met at any point during life, Park stares into the camera, realising he may never be caught.

== Cast ==
- Song Kang-ho as Park Doo-man, the lead detective
- Kim Sang-kyung as Seo Tae-yoon, a detective from Seoul
- Kim Roi-ha as Cho Yong-koo, Park's partner
- Song Jae-ho as Sergeant Shin Dong-chul
- Byun Hee-bong as Sergeant Koo Hee-bong
- Go Seo-hee as Officer Kwon Kwi-ok
- Ryu Tae-ho as Jo Byeong-Sun, the second suspect
- Park No-shik as Baek Kwang-ho, the initial suspect
- Park Hae-il as Park Hyeon-gyu, the third suspect
- Jeon Mi-seon as Kwok Seol-yung, Park Doo-man's girlfriend and then wife

== Production ==
=== Development ===
On September 9, 2002, Bong announced the start of filming in a press conference held at the Kumho Museum of Art. During the conference, Bong addressed the difficulties of shooting the film, saying that "even though they avoided the location of the incident, Hwaseong, while filming, it was done carefully since the family of the victims of the real cases were still alive". In an interview with South Korean newspaper Hankook Ilbo in August 2002, regarding the motivation for making the film, he replied that as a fan of detective fiction he "aimed to depict the horror that has not yet been revealed through the emotions evoked through the clash of unmatching concepts of scenic landscapes and grotesque corpses" along with the limitation of the times. The conflict framework and the elements of investigation through the usage of FM radio was borrowed from the play Come to See Me, and the scenario was written based on real case reports of the incident as well as personal interviews of the detective who was involved in the case. The film also aimed to reflect his personal reflections from the domestic box office failure of his previous work Barking Dogs Never Bite, which he described as an "enumeration of personal interests".

=== Filming ===
Filming took place in Jangseong County, South Jeolla Province and the reed field scene was filmed in Haenam County, South Jeolla Province, with cinematography by Kim Hyung-koo. The tunnel scenes were filmed at the Jukbong tunnel located in Jinju.

== Music ==
The production team initially contacted many famous Japanese composers such as Joe Hisaishi, and yet tried to find the right music that would not "overwhelm the film", and later found about Taro Iwashiro. Bong and Iwashiro met each other on two occasions to exchange ideas in 10-hour meetings in Japan and South Korea respectively. Initially over 20 demo tapes were sent to Bong, with some modifications in response to Bong's requests. To reflect the blank spaces that are intentionally laid on the screens in the frames of the film as well as the missing information in time, the music was composed in "almost connected, yet almost disconnected rhythms". The style of the music was also required to be realistic and to contain themes of memory of the times and murder.

== Reception ==
Within a year of its debut, Memories of Murder was received as a cult film. Later in the decade, it was praised by numerous international publications, referred to as one of the best crime films of the 21st century and one of the greatest Korean films of all time. On the review aggregator website Rotten Tomatoes, 95% of 80 critics' reviews are positive, with an average rating of 8.2/10. The website's consensus reads: "Memories of Murder blends the familiar crime genre with social satire and comedy, capturing the all-too human desperation of its key characters." Metacritic, which uses a weighted average, assigned the film a score of 82 out of 100, based on 18 critics, indicating "universal acclaim".

Manohla Dargis of The New York Times wrote, "Memories of Murder is such a taut, effective thriller it's a shame you have to read subtitles to gauge just how good a movie it is. If you don't speak Korean, that is. [...] The movie in question works better than most Hollywood thrillers and even those Law & Order procedurals." Desson Thomson of The Washington Post called the film "involving and skillfully mounted" and opined that it "is as exciting for its narrative twists and turns as for its Korean textures and rhythms." Peter Bradshaw of The Guardian gave it four out of five stars and stated, "Memories of Murder is a great satire of official laxity and arrogance, and its final scene is very chilling." Derek Elley of Variety described the film as "a powerful, slow-burning portrait of human fallibility."

By the end of the film's domestic run, it had been seen by 5,101,645 people, making it the most watched film during the year 2003 in South Korea. While it was eventually outgained by Silmido, which was released in the same year, most of Silmido's audience did not see it until 2004. At the end of the film's run, Memories of Murder was also the fourth most viewed film of all time in the country, after Shiri, Friend and Joint Security Area. The commercial success of the film has been credited as saving one of its production companies, Sidus Pictures, from bankruptcy.

Memories of Murder received screenings at several international film festivals, including New Zealand International Film Festival, South Western International Film Festival, Hawaii International Film Festival, London International Film Festival, Tokyo International Film Festival and San Sebastian International Film Festival, where Bong Joon Ho won the Best Director Award.

Director Quentin Tarantino named it, along with Bong's The Host, one of his Top 20 favorite movies since 1992. It was also chosen as the best Korean film of the century. Sight & Sound included it in their list of "30 key films that defined the decade". It was No. 63 in Slant Magazine's list of the 100 best films of the 2000s.

In 2010, Film Comment listed their top films of the decade based on an international poll of various cinephiles, including filmmakers, critics and academics. Two films directed by Bong Joon Ho were included in the list – The Host (No. 71) and Memories of Murder (No. 84).

In 2025, it ranked number 99 on The New York Times' list of "The 100 Best Movies of the 21st Century" and number 49 on the "Readers' Choice" edition of the list.

== Release ==
In 2020, distributor NEON had acquired the rights to restore Memories of Murder. The film was released on Blu-ray on April 20, 2021, by The Criterion Collection.

== Real-life case ==
While a total body count was never mentioned in the film, at least 10 similar murders were committed in the Hwaseong area between October 1986 and April 1991 in what became known as the Hwaseong serial murders.

Some of the details of the murders presented in the movie, such as the killer's gagging the women with their underwear, were taken from the case. As in the film, at the crime scenes, the investigators found bodily fluids suspected to belong to the murderer, but they did not have access to equipment to determine whether the DNA matched suspect DNA until late in the investigations. After the ninth murder, DNA evidence was sent to Japan (unlike the film, where it was sent to America) for analysis, but the results did not match any suspects.

At the time of the film's release, the actual murderer had not yet been caught. As the case was growing close to reaching the statute of limitations, South Korea's leading Uri Party sought to amend the law to give the prosecutors more time to find the murderer. However, in 2006, the statute of limitations was reached for the last-known victim.

Over a decade later, on September 18, 2019, police announced that a man in his 50s, Lee Choon-jae, had been identified as a suspect in the killings. He was identified after DNA from the underwear of one victim was matched with his, and subsequent DNA testing linked him to four of the other unsolved serial murders. At the time he was identified, he was already serving a life sentence in a prison in Busan for the rape and murder of his sister-in-law.

Lee initially denied any involvement in the serial murders, but, on October 2, 2019, police announced he had confessed to killing 14 people, including all 10 serial murders. Two of the additional four murders happened in Suwon, and the other two happened in Cheongju; as of October 2019, details about the victims have not been released because the investigation is ongoing. In addition to the murders, Lee also confessed to more than 30 rapes and attempted rapes.

After Lee's identification, Bong Joon Ho commented, "When I made the film, I was very curious, and I also thought a lot about this murderer. I wondered what he look[ed] like." He later added, "I was able to see a photo of his face. And I think I need more time to really explain my emotions from that, but right now I'd just like to applaud the police force for their endless effort to find the culprit."

== Themes ==
The movie deals with extreme content: murder, rape, and violence. Moreover, Bong eschews the conventional Western detective genre movie by placing it in a Korean context, particularly that of the 1980s, a dark time symbolized by political oppression and cultural conservatism. In interviews, he has said that he has continually sought to deconstruct western cinema genres created during the second half of the 20th century by showing how they fail to account for specific lived Korean experiences.

=== The Abyss ===
Professor of Korean Studies and cultural critic David Tizzard has pointed to Bong's use of the abyss in his movies, seeing it evident in Memories of Murder (2003), Mother (2009), and Parasite (2019). He describes it as "a dark blackness that stands unapologetically in his films. A space devoid of light. Both psychological and physical. It is the train tunnel in Memories of Murder, the alley in Mother, and the basement in Parasite. That darkness is the host of that which we do not want to see. It is our shadow, as both individuals and a species."

== Awards and honors ==
2003 Chunsa Film Art Awards

- Best Film
- Best Director – Bong Joon-ho
- Best Actor – Song Kang-ho
- Best Supporting Actor – Park No-shik
- Best Screenplay – Bong Joon-ho, Shim Sung-bo
- Best Cinematography – Kim Hyung-koo
- Best Editing – Kim Sun-min

2003 Busan Film Critics Awards

- Best Director – Bong Joon-ho
- Best Screenplay – Bong Joon-ho

2003 Grand Bell Awards

- Best Film
- Best Director – Bong Joon-ho
- Best Actor – Song Kang-ho

2003 Tokyo International Film Festival

- Best Asian Film

2003 Blue Dragon Film Awards

- Best Cinematography – Kim Hyung-koo

2003 Korean Film Awards

- Best Film
- Best Director – Bong Joon-ho
- Best Actor – Song Kang-ho
- Best Screenplay – Bong Joon-ho and Shim Sung-bo
- Best Cinematography – Kim Hyung-koo
- Best Editing – Kim Sun-min

2003 Director's Cut Awards

- Best Director – Bong Joon-ho
- Best Actor – Song Kang-ho
- Best Producer – Cha Seung-jae

2003 Torino Film Festival

- Best Screenplay – Bong Joon-ho and Shim Sung-bo

2004 Festival du Film Policier de Cognac

- First Prize
- Premier Prize

== Adaptation ==
Screenwriter Kim Eun-hee (Sign, Phantom) was attached to a television adaptation with the working title Signal, which aired on tvN in 2016.

Gap-dong, which aired on tvN in 2014, was also loosely inspired by the film.

The Bollywood movie Footfairy was also loosely based on the film.
