= Barking Dogs Never Bite =

2000 dark comedy film directed by Bong Joon Ho

- Promotional release poster
- Hangul: 플란다스의 개
- RR: Peullandaseuui gae
- MR: P'ŭllandasŭŭi kae
- Directed by: Bong Joon Ho
- Written by: Bong Joon-ho; Song Ji-ho; Derek Son Tae-woong
- Produced by: Cha Seung-jae
- Starring: Lee Sung-jae; Bae Doona
- Cinematography: Jo Yong-gyu
- Edited by: Lee Eun-soo
- Music by: Jo Seong-woo
- Distributed by: Cinema Service
- Release date: 19 February 2000
- Running time: 106 minutes
- Country: South Korea
- Language: Korean

Barking Dogs Never Bite (Korean: 플란다스의 개, also known as A Higher Animal and Dog of Flanders) is a 2000 South Korean independent dark comedy film directed and co-written by Bong Joon Ho in his directorial debut. The film's Korean title is satirically named after the 1872 novel A Dog of Flanders, a European pet story that is very popular in parts of East Asia.

Barking Dogs Never Bite stars Lee Sung-jae as an out-of-work academic who is irritated by the sound of barking dogs in his apartment building and resorts to kidnapping and killing them. Meanwhile, a young woman who works at the apartment complex (played by Bae Doona) decides to investigate the matter after she starts receiving notices from tenants about the missing dogs.

== Plot ==
Ko Yun-ju, an unemployed academic, lives in an apartment complex with his pregnant wife Eun-sil. He is struggling to become a professor and grappling with his strained relationship with Eun-sil. Searching for the barking dog of one of his neighbors, which is driving him crazy, he finds an unattended Shih Tzu. He tries to drop the dog from the roof, but hesitates and is stopped when an old woman comes to dry radishes there. He takes the dog into the basement and, being unable to hang it, locks it inside a cabinet.

Park Hyun-nam, the lazy bookkeeper and custodian of the apartment complex, longs to be famous like a bank teller she and her friend Yoon Jang-mi saw on TV, who was rewarded for stopping a robbery. A little girl comes to Hyun-nam with flyers she wants to hang up in order to find her missing dog, the Shih Tzu. Yun-ju continues to hear barking, and sees the old woman from the roof with her Min Pin, the actual source of the noise. He reads on the flyer for the missing dog that it was unable to bark because of a throat operation. Realizing his mistake, he goes to the basement at night to free the dog from the cabinet, but hides when a janitor arrives. Yun-ju watches in horror as the janitor pulls out the dead Shih Tzu and prepares to cook and eat it.

The next day, Yun-ju disguises himself and sneaks up on the old woman and steals her dog. Hyun-nam witnesses him throw the dog off the roof. Seeing an opportunity to achieve her dream of gaining fame, she chases Yun-ju, never seeing his face, but is knocked unconscious when she is hit by an opening door, and Yun-ju escapes. The old woman comes to Hyun-nam with "lost dog" flyers, and when Hyun-nam shows her the Min Pin's body, she faints from shock and is hospitalized. Hyun-nam gets the janitor to bury the Min Pin, but he digs up the body and takes it to the basement to make a stew. When he goes to get some seasoning, a homeless man living in the basement comes out and tastes the janitor's food. The janitor comes back to discover his stew is gone.

As Yun-ju struggles to come up with the money needed to bribe his way into a professorial position, Eun-sil, who has lost her job, comes home with a Toy Poodle. She shows more affection for the dog, which she names Soon-Ja (Baby), than her husband, and treats Yun-ju like a servant. While in the park, Yun-ju becomes distracted and loses Soon-Ja. When Eun-sil scolds him for losing the dog, he snaps and accuses her of wasting money. Eun-sil tearfully tells him she bought the dog with a small portion of her severance pay and planned to give the rest to Yun-ju so he could become a professor. Shocked, Yun-ju makes up missing dog flyers and takes them to Hyun-nam, who offers to help him, but he gives up his search after nobody, not even the dog-eating janitor, seems to have Soon-Ja.

While being berated for her sloppiness at work, Hyun-nam learns the old woman died from the shock of losing her dog, her only family, and left a letter bequeathing to Hyun-nam the dried radishes that are still on the roof. When Hyun-nam goes to get them, she discovers Soon-Ja with the homeless man, who kidnapped her, having developed a taste for dog meat. Hyun-nam rescues the dog and the man chases her through the apartment building. Jang-mi arrives and knocks out the homeless man, who is arrested by police, and Hyun-nam returns Soon-Ja to Yun-ju.

Hyun-nam watches a news broadcast about the missing dogs, but sees no mention of herself, leaving her annoyed. Later that night, she finds a drunk Yun-ju on the sidewalk. Overcome with guilt after hearing she got fired for spending time looking for dogs, he confesses he was the man she saw throw the Min Pin off the roof.

Some time later, Yun-ju has succeeded in becoming a professor, though he appears unsatisfied, and Hyun-nam goes on a long-awaited hike in the woods with Jang-mi.

== Cast ==
- Lee Sung-jae as Go Yoon-joo (Ko Yun-ju), a young academic struggling to become a professor
- Bae Doona as Park Hyun-nam, an ignorant maintenance worker and bookkeeper for the apartments who aspires to become famous
- Kim Ho-jung as Eun-sil, Yun-ju's pregnant wife
- Byun Hee-bong as the janitor, who steals lost and dead dogs and uses them as stew meat
- Go Soo-hee as Yoon Jang-mi, a toy store owner and Hyun-nam's friend
- Kim Roi-ha as the homeless man, who lives in the apartment basement
- Kim Jin-goo as the old lady, a resident of the apartment who owns a min pin

== Production ==
=== Plot development ===
The plot was inspired by Bong's childhood experience of finding a dead puppy on the top of the building. This left a strong impression on him, and he was scared that the security guards would eat it.

=== Casting ===
Despite Bae Doona being new to the Korean film industry, she was recommended to the production company by Bong who loved her "smooth moves like an octopus" and her unpretentious speech patterns. Lee Sung-jae was cast because of his performance in the 1998 TV drama Lie (거짓말).

=== Camerawork ===
The movie was filmed to invoke emotions that people would feel while watching a cartoon, and thus was shot by mixing the speed of filming.

== Release ==
Magnolia Pictures acquired the American distribution rights to the film in late summer of 2009.

== Reception ==
The film only attracted 57,000 audience members in its initial release, but critics consider it to be a "cursed masterpiece".

On the review aggregator website Rotten Tomatoes, 88% of 17 critics' reviews are positive, with an average rating of 8.0/10. On Metacritic, the film has a weighted average score of 66 out of 100 based on 8 critic reviews, indicating "generally favorable reviews". Stephen Short of Time Asia remarked that Barking Dogs Never Bite "may be this year's most inventive Asian film", favorably comparing it to Jean-Pierre Jeunet's Amélie released that same year.

At the 2000 Grand Bell Awards in South Korea, Bae Doona was nominated for the Grand Bell Award for Best New Actress. Lead actress Bae Doona stated in 2019 that the film contained the most memorable scene of her career, in which she is being chased by a homeless man throughout the apartment complex.

== See also ==
- List of Korean-language films
