= Okja =

2017 film by Bong Joon Ho

- Release poster
- Directed by: Bong Joon Ho
- Screenplay by: Bong Joon Ho; Jon Ronson
- Story by: Bong Joon Ho
- Produced by: Dede Gardner; Jeremy Kleiner; Lewis Taewan Kim; Dooho Choi; Seo Woo-sik; Bong Joon Ho; Ted Sarandos
- Starring: Tilda Swinton; Paul Dano; Ahn Seo-hyun; Byun Hee-bong; Steven Yeun; Lily Collins; Yoon Je-moon; Shirley Henderson; Daniel Henshall; Devon Bostick; Choi Woo-shik; Giancarlo Esposito; Jake Gyllenhaal
- Cinematography: Darius Khondji
- Edited by: Yang Jin-mo
- Music by: Jung Jae-il
- Production companies: Plan B Entertainment; Lewis Pictures; Kate Street Picture Company
- Distributed by: Netflix (international); Next Entertainment World (South Korea)
- Release dates: May 19, 2017 (Cannes); June 28, 2017 (United States); June 29, 2017 (South Korea)
- Running time: 120 minutes
- Countries: South Korea; United States
- Languages: English; Korean
- Budget: $50 million
- Box office: $2 million

Okja (Korean: 옥자; pronounced [ok̚.tɕ͈a]) is a 2017 science fiction action-adventure film directed by Bong Joon Ho with a screenplay by Bong and Jon Ronson from a story by Bong. The film is about a teenage girl who raised a genetically modified "super pig" (the titular Okja). When Okja is taken to the United States by a meat industry corporation, the girl goes on a mission to rescue Okja from mistreatment and slaughter while befriending the Animal Liberation Front. An international co-production of South Korea and the United States, it stars an ensemble cast headed by child actor Ahn Seo-hyun in her film debut, along with Byun Hee-bong, Yoon Je-moon, Choi Woo-shik, Tilda Swinton (in a dual role), Paul Dano, Steven Yeun, Lily Collins, Shirley Henderson, Daniel Henshall, Devon Bostick, Giancarlo Esposito, and Jake Gyllenhaal.

The film competed for the Palme d'Or in the main competition section at the 2017 Cannes Film Festival. It was released on Netflix on June 28, 2017. The film received positive reviews from critics.

== Plot ==
In 2007, Lucy Mirando, pretending to be a environmentalist, becomes CEO of the Mirando Corporation, succeeding her twin sister Nancy. Announcing they have been breeding a special kind of "super pig", 26 specimens are sent to farmers around the world. 10 years later, one of them will be awarded the title of best super pig.

In 2017, a teenage girl named Mija lives in the South Korean mountains with her grandfather and their super pig Okja. Mija and Okja have a very close relationship as they spend much of their time together. At one point, Okja saves Mija from falling off a cliff. They are visited by Mirando spokesperson and zoologist Dr. Johnny Wilcox, who declares Okja the best super pig, and announces that they will take her to New York City. Her grandfather gives Mija a solid gold pig figurine, explaining he saved up to replace Okja when she was taken away. Devastated, Mija goes to Seoul to find Okja, where she sees her being loaded onto a truck. Mija chases down the truck, but it is intercepted by the Animal Liberation Front.

In the resulting chaos, Mija and Okja run away and are eventually saved by the ALF led by Jay. The truck driver Kim Woo-shik resigns from his job. Jay asks another ALF member K to translate and tell Mija that they plan to put a recording device in Okja's ear and let her be recaptured by the Mirando Corporation to document how they mistreat animals. Mija asks them to return her to the mountains, but K purposely mistranslates and tells them Mija agrees. They leave and Okja is recaptured.

To minimize PR damage to the company, Lucy pays for Mija to come to New York to stage a heart-warming reunion with her pig. Okja is taken to a laboratory where she is forcibly bred with another super pig and flesh is taken from her for a taste test. After the ALF sees the footage, K reveals that he lied to the rest of the group about Mija's support of the plan. Jay beats up K and expels him from the ALF while promising to return his equipment when they are done with it.

In New York, Mija has to comply with the Mirando Corp. Jay slips into her room and tells her they plan to rescue Okja while on stage. During the Mirando parade, a battered and temporarily blinded Okja attacks Mija. Jay tries to hurt Okja to protect the girl, but Mija doesn't let him and calms Okja down. The ALF shows Okja's mistreatment to the public, who quickly turn against Mirando. Lucy surrenders Mirando back to Nancy who contacts the private security firm Black Chalk to take out the ALF members. Okja is recaptured and the ALF members are arrested except for Mija and Jay who are rescued by a remorseful K. Nancy starts full production at the slaughterhouse.

K, Mija, and Jay travel to a processing plant in search of Okja and find her being forced up a ramp into a slaughterhouse. On the verge of being slaughtered, Mija shows a Mirando employee a photo of herself with baby Okja, prompting him to stop. Nancy arrives and Mija offers the gold pig in exchange for Okja's life. Although initially reluctant, Nancy agrees as she deemed it a good business deal, having Jay and K arrested by Black Chalk. As Mija and Okja are escorted away, a pair of super pigs push their newborn through the electric fence to Okja to hide and rescue from the farm.

Back in the countryside, Mija resumes her life with her grandfather, Okja, and the new piglet. She then joins her grandfather for dinner as Okja looks on.

In a post-credits scene, Jay is released from prison, boarding a bus with K and the other released members of the ALF. With their newest member Kim Woo-shik, who was revealed to have started mirandoisfucked.com, they plan to disrupt a major Mirando shareholders meeting as more new recruits are revealed.

== Cast ==
- Ahn Seo-hyun as Mija, a Korean farm girl who takes care of and helped raise Okja
- Tilda Swinton as:
  - Lucy Mirando, the eccentric powerful CEO of the Mirando Corporation looking to profit from Okja and the super pig program
  - Nancy Mirando, Lucy's twin sister and the cruel former CEO of the Mirando Corporation who later regains control of the corporation
- Paul Dano as Jay, the leader of an animal-rights activist group called the Animal Liberation Front (ALF)
- Byun Hee-bong as Hee Bong, a farmer who is Mija's grandfather
- Jake Gyllenhaal as Johnny Wilcox, a disturbed zoologist and TV personality
- Steven Yeun as K, an animal-rights activist and ALF member who serves as translator between Mija and the rest of the ALF
- Giancarlo Esposito as Frank Dawson, an executive with the Mirando Corporation who is loyal to the Mirandos
- Lily Collins as Red, an animal-rights activist and ALF member
- Yoon Je-moon as Mundo Park, a Korean representative of the Mirando Corporation
- Shirley Henderson as Jennifer, Lucy's personal assistant
- Daniel Henshall as Blond, an animal-rights activist and ALF member
- Devon Bostick as Silver, an animal-rights activist, ALF member, and the boyfriend of Blond
- Choi Woo-shik as Kim Woo-shik, a young driver for the Mirando Corporation who later sides with ALF by the post-credits scene
- Lee Jung-eun as:
  - Okja's vocal effects
  - Wheelchair woman
- Lee Bong-ryun as Mirando Korea desk clerk

== Development and production ==
In October 2015, it was announced that director Bong Joon Ho's next film would feature a South Korean female lead and a cast of English-speaking supporting actors, with filming set in New York. On November 10, 2015, it was picked up by Netflix and Plan B Entertainment with a budget of $50 million, with production starting in late 2016 for release in 2017. Darius Khondji joined the film as cinematographer in February 2016.

Bong sought out Welsh author Jon Ronson to help with the script. Working with a rough draft of the story, Ronson helped develop the English-speaking characters.

Principal photography began on April 22, 2016, in Seoul, South Korea. It moved to Vancouver, British Columbia, Canada for more filming on July 31, 2016. Bong visited a Colorado slaughterhouse to prepare for the film's slaughterhouse sequence, an experience that converted Bong and producer Dooho Choi into temporary vegans. Bong has called Okja "a very shy and introverted animal. It's a unique animal that we've not seen before." Filming wrapped on August 27, 2016.

=== Themes ===
In an interview, Bong said the film touched on "capitalism". Co-writer Jon Ronson said he believed the movie would "turn people vegetarian", adding, "I really don't think that was my intention or Bong's intention".

== Release ==
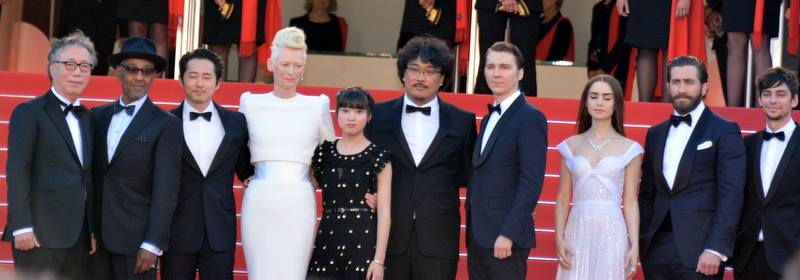
Cast and director at the 2017 Cannes Film Festival.

Okja had its world premiere at the 2017 Cannes Film Festival on May 18, 2017. During the first few minutes of its screening at its Cannes premiere, the film was met with boos mixed with some applause twice: once when the Netflix logo appeared on the screen and again during a technical glitch which projected the film in an incorrect aspect ratio for its first seven minutes. The festival later issued an apology to its filmmakers for projecting the film incorrectly. In the end, the film received a four-minute standing ovation at its end.

The film was released on Netflix on June 28, 2017. In July 2022, it was released on Blu-ray and DVD as part of The Criterion Collection.

== Reception ==
=== Box office ===
Several independent theatres in South Korea screened the film to much success, with earnings totalling 2.3 billion KRW ($2.1 million USD) from 300,953 tickets sold.

=== Critical response ===
On the film review aggregator website Rotten Tomatoes, the film has an approval rating of 87% based on 238 reviews, with a weighted average of 7.6/10; the site's "critics consensus" reads: "Okja sees Bong Joon-ho continuing to create defiantly eclectic entertainment – and still hitting more than enough of his narrative targets in the midst of a tricky tonal juggling act." On Metacritic, the film has a weighted average score of 75 out of 100 based on 36 critics, indicating "generally favorable reviews".

A.O. Scott of The New York Times wrote of the film: "Okja is a miracle of imagination and technique, and Okja insists, with abundant mischief and absolute sincerity, that she possesses a soul." In November 2019, the film was included on The Times' list of "The 10 Most Influential Films of the Decade".

A reference is made to the film in "The Stall" is the third episode of Poker Face, a Mystery / Comedy-Drama series airing on Peacock. "The Stall" focuses on a brother-owned meat business. One brother, George, befriends the main character, Charlie, and she offers him a couple of DVDs to get his mind off of things. She includes Okja in this selection and it catches his eye; she off-handedly says "I haven't finished it but the first half was pretty cute." The following shot is the next morning, where George exits his trailer distraught and looking emotionally worn. The film had a profound impact on his decision to continue being a part of the meat business, as he falls to his knees in front of his meat smoker and tells Charlie, "I'm a murderer."

=== Accolades ===
Year	Awards Body	Category	Recipient(s) and nominee(s)	Result	Ref.
2017	Cannes Film Festival	Palme d'Or	Bong Joon-ho	Nominated	
2018	Saturn Awards	Best Television Presentation	Okja	Nominated	

== See also ==
- Genetically modified food
- Meat industry
