= Gwangjujwa =

1916–1931 theater in Gwangju, Korea

Gwangjujwa (Korean: 광주좌; Hanja: 光州座) was a historic theater that existed between 1916 and 1931 during the Japanese colonial period in Hwanggeum-dong, Dong District, Gwangju, Korea, Empire of Japan.

It was established by Japanese person Fujigawa Tadayoshi (藤川忠義). It had two stories and could seat around 300 people, although people were expected to be seated on tatami mats on the floor, instead of on chairs. It was located at what is now the Palace Tourist Hotel. It was known for not only screening films, but also for hosting various types of cultural performances, including plays and concerts. It was expanded in March 1924 and reopened on November 3, 1925. However, on November 8, 1931, it was destroyed due to an accidental fire caused by a candle Fujigawa had lit.

== See also ==
- Gwangju Cinema – a Korean-owned theater established to fill a niche that Gwangjujwa left after its destruction
