= Jeon Bong-jun =

Korean peasant revolutionary (1853–1895)

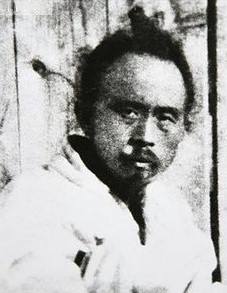
- Born: December 3, 1855; Gochang, Jeolla Province, Joseon
- Died: April 24, 1895 (aged 39); Seoul, Joseon
- Other names: Jeon Yeong-jun "General Mung Bean"
- Spouse(s): Lady Song of the Yeosan Clan; Lady Yi of the Nampyeong Clan
- Children: 4
- Parents: Jeon Chang-hyuk (father); Lady Kim of the Eonyang Clan (mother)

- Jeon Bong-jun
- Hangul: 전봉준
- Hanja: 全琫準
- RR: Jeon Bongjun
- MR: Chŏn Pongjun

Art name
- Hangul: 해몽
- Hanja: 海夢
- RR: Haemong
- MR: Haemong

Courtesy name
- Hangul: 명숙
- Hanja: 明淑
- RR: Myeongsuk
- MR: Myŏngsuk

Jeon Bong-jun (Note: Also written Chon Bong-joon) (Korean: 전봉준; December 3, 1855 – April 24, 1895) was a Korean peasant revolutionary who was a prominent leader of the Donghak movement. During the Donghak Peasant Revolution, he led the initial revolt in Gobu and later led the Southern Jeob rebels. After his defeat at the Battle of Ugeumchi, he was captured and was later executed in April 1895. Due to his short physical stature, he was called "Nokdu Janggun" (녹두장군, General mung bean).

== Early life ==
Jeon Bong-jun was born on December 3, 1855, (Note: According to the undermentioned genealogy book, Jeon was born on December 3, 1855, on the Gregorian Calendar. Several other sources cite January 10, 1855 as his date of birth.) in Jeolla Province (now North Jeolla Province), as a member of the Cheonan Jeon clan. Previously, Korean historians have suggested various places, including Wanju, Jeongeup, and Gochang as his specific place of birth. However, following the discovery of compelling evidence from a genealogy book of the Cheonan Jeon clan, many historians now agree that his exact place of birth was Dangchon village, Jukrim-ri, Gochang-eup, Gochang.

Jeon Bong-jun's father, Jeon Chang-hyuk (전창혁; 全彰爀), was a neo-Confucianist scholar who was a member of the Hyanggyo of Gobu. Jeon learned classical Chinese from his father, and occasionally wrote poetry. In 1940, writer Oh Ji-young, who had been an acquaintance of Jeon's, published a book containing a poem titled Baekgusi (백구시; 白鷗詩), which he claimed was written by Jeon when he was a child. However, this claim has been discredited by the historical community.

During his early adolescence, Jeon left Dangchon village with his father and migrated throughout multiple regions in Jeolla, probably in search of better livelihoods. During his late teenage years, Jeon migrated to a village in Donggok-ri, Taein, (Note: now administratively part of sanwae-myeon, Jeongeup, North Jeolla) which was likely where he first met Kim Gae-nam. According to other local tales of his youth, Jeon lived in a village in Wonpyeong, Geumgu (Note: now Geumsan-myeon, Gimje, North Jeolla) during his late adolescence years.

According to the aforementioned genealogy book, Jeon's first spouse was Lady Song of the Yeosan Clan, the daughter of Song Du-ok (송두옥; 宋斗玉). When Song died in 1877, he remarried Lady Yi of the Nampyeong Clan, daughter of Yi Mun-ki (이문기; 李文琦). He had two daughters with Lady Song and two sons with Lady Yi. Recent studies on Jeon Bong-jun's family lineage have also suggested that Jeon may have been the brother-in-law of renowned Seon Buddhist monk Gyeongheo, whose father's name was also Song Du-ok. According to historian Hong Hyeon-ji, a letter, written and sent by Gyeongheo himself to Jeon Chang-hyuk, was discovered. The letter discussed matters over the marriage between his sister and Jeon.

Jeon made a living as a medicine seller, farmer, and village teacher. During an 1895 interrogation, Jeon recounted that he and his family had lived in poverty before his involvement in the revolt, and were barely able to "have rice as breakfast, and porridge as dinner." (Note: 동학 농민 운동에 가담하기 전 전봉준의 가정 형편을 알 수 있는 자료로는 1895년 공초 자료가 있다. 이 자료에 따르면 전봉준은 “전답 3두락을 가지고 있으며 아침에는 밥을, 저녁에는 겨우 죽을 먹을 정도”라고 말하였다.)

== Ideas of reform ==
Around the late 19th century, Joseon Korea was plagued with various social problems, including poverty, excessive taxation, and corruption. Outside of its borders, foreign powers, such as Japan, France, Germany, Russia, Qing China, and the United States all sought to expand their influence over Korea, often through unequal treaties and gunboat diplomacy. Joseon politics were split between pro-Russian, pro-Japanese, and pro-Qing factions, with little effort made to alleviate the burdens of the peasantry. These issues brought discontent and protest among peasants, and ideas of political and social reform among scholars. At some point around his late 20s to early 30s, Jeon acquired a copy of Chŏng Yagyong's Gyeongse Yupyo, which had previously been retained by seonbis from Haenam and Gangjin. Jeon became heavily influenced by Jeong's ideas. He exchanged ideas of reform with other thinkers, including Son Hwa-jung, Choi Gyeong-seon, and Kim Gae-nam.

=== Career as Regent Heungseon's retainer ===
In 1890, Jeon visited Unhyeongung palace to see regent Heungseon, who had been residing there since his return to the palace in August 1885. There, Jeon was appointed by Heungseon as his retainer. Jeon exchanged ideas of national reform with him during his career. In 1892, Jeon concluded his career as a retainer and returned to Gobu.

=== Involvement in Donghak ===
The Donghak movement, which was first created by Choe Je-u in 1860, had spread to the Jeolla region by the 1880s, gaining widespread support from the indignant peasantry through its ideas of universal equality and human welfare. Jeon Bong-jun joined Donghak between 1888 and 1891, presumably after moving to Gobu from Taein. Jeon interpreted the Donghak movement as a movement that promoted both personal spirituality and discipline (수심경천; 守心敬天) along with social reform (보국안민; 輔國安民). According to the March 6, 1895 issue of the Tokyo Asahi Shimbun, Jeon claimed in an interrogation that he was introduced to the Donghak movement by Kim Chi-do (김치도; 金致道) in 1892. He detailed that he participated in the movement as he was moved by its principles and wished to "achieve the goals" of "driving out corrupt officials" and "protecting the nation and bringing comfort to the people", rather than due to religious motives. (Note: 동학 입교에 대해서는 1895년 3월 6일자 『동경 조일 신문』 동학당 대두목의 후속 심문을 보면 “평상시 보국안민(輔國安民)의 생각을 지니고 있었는데 1892년 김치도(金致道)에 의해 동학 문건을 건네받고 ‘정심(正心)’이라는 내용에 감동해서 입교하였다”라고 밝히고 있다. 그리고 동학에 입교한 주목적을 “종교적 입장보다 탐관오리를 축출하고 보국안민의 대업을 이루려는 구상을 실현하기 위해 협동 일치와 결당(結黨)의 유용성 때문”이라고 밝혔다.)

Jeon became a prominent figure of the movement through his active engagement during the Gyojo Shinwon movement. Among the three main goals of the movement, he is said to have participated most enthusiastically in the expulsion of Japanese and Western influence. Jeon participated in several mass protests and pleas against the Joseon government's suppression of Donghak. He took a leading role during the 1892 protests at Samrye and later gathered Donghak members in Wonpyeong in preparation for the February 1893 mass appeals at Gyeongbokgung and the subsequent March 1893 protests in Boeun. He was soon promoted as the regional leader of the movement of Gobu by Choe Si-hyeong.

== Struggle and revolution ==
=== Gobu Revolt ===
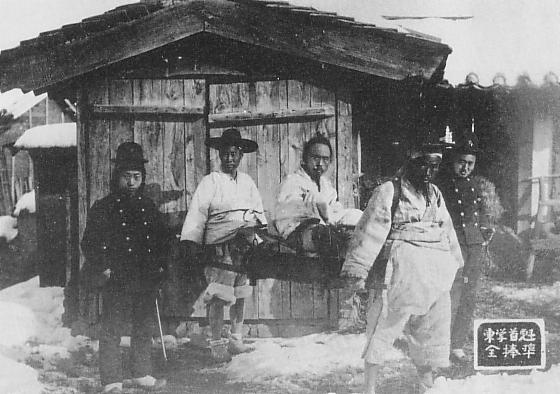
Jeon, seated at center, after his capture at Ugeumchi in 1894.

In December 1893, a group of Gobu peasants, who were enraged by the harsh policies enacted by Gobu magistrate Jo Byeong-Gap, pleaded the lifting of heavy taxes and the return of extorted property. Jeon acted as the head of the protesters, with his name cited on the head of the written complaint. This plea was rejected, and Jeon and the peasants were forcefully dismissed from the local Gwan-a. In response, Jeon gathered a group of 20 revolutionaries who pledged to gather forces and initiate a general revolt, with their names signed on the Sabal Tongmun code. On January 10, 1894, a total of 1000 peasants revolted and attacked the Gwan-a under Jeon Bong-jun's leadership.

The revolt was successful. The local rice storage was destroyed, and most of the illegally taxed rice was retrieved. Jo Byeon-gap fled to nearby Jeonju. The Joseon government appointed hyeongam (Note: (현감; 縣監) governor of a hyeon) of yong-an Pak Won-myeong (박원명; 朴源明) as the new magistrate of Gobu, and ordered the investigation and management of the incident. Most of the rebels returned to their households following the successful revolt. However, Jeon took hold of his forces and relocated them to Baeksan Mountain.

== End of revolution ==
On April 28, 1894, Jeon Bong Jun's revolution became anti-Western and anti-Japanese because of the oppressive and brutal actions of the Japanese army in punishing the Korean farmers. This revolution spread from town to county as the peasant army vowed to eradicate the entirety of the Korean ruling class and expel all Japanese and western parties. By September his peasant revolt came to a violent end as his army of farmers were decisively defeated by a well trained, better equipped Japanese military in the Battle of Ugeumchi. Jeon Bong-jun was arrested by the governor of Jeolla province, Yi Do-jae, and was executed by hanging on 24 April 1895.

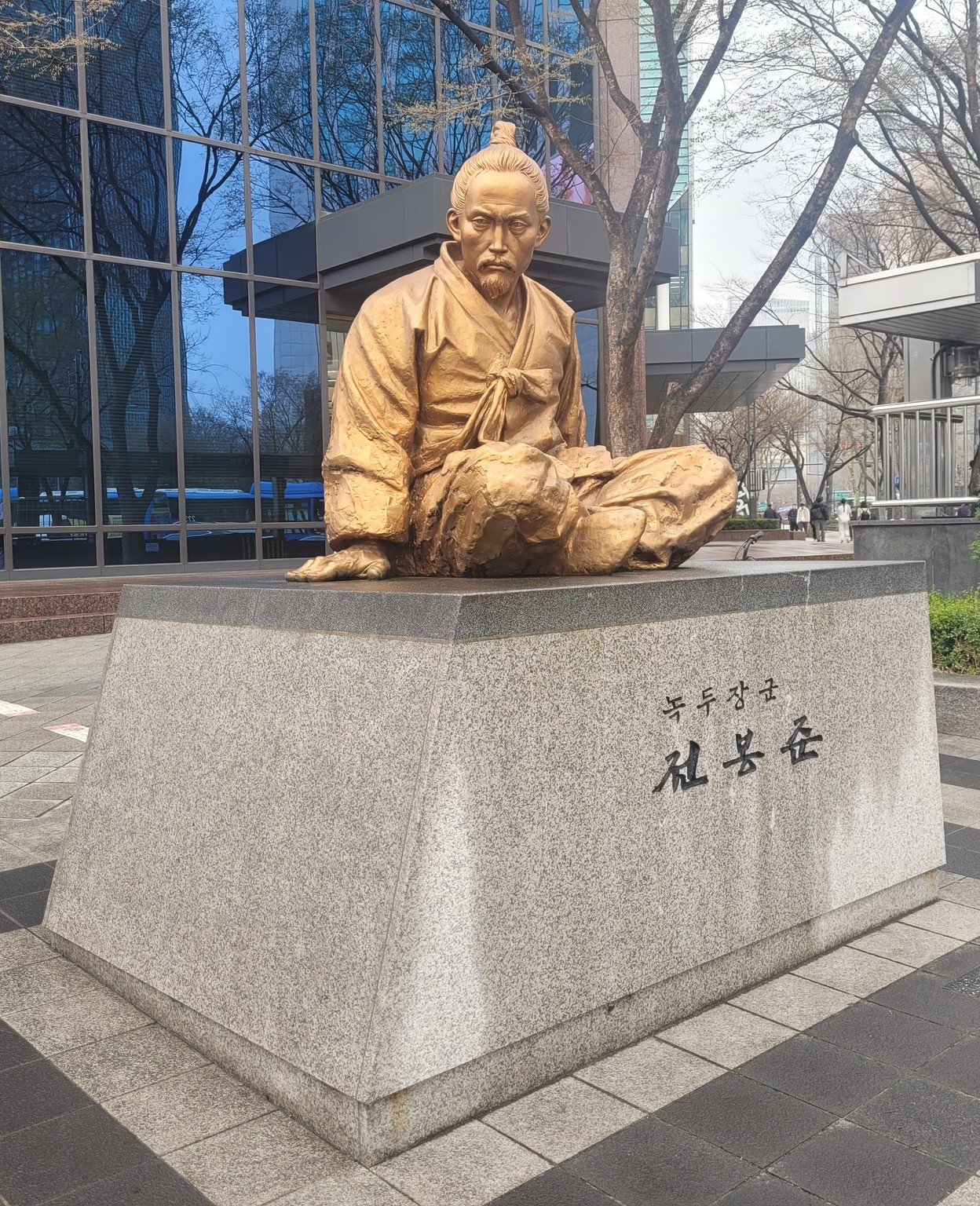
Jeon Bong-jun statue in Seoul

== Cultural depictions ==
- Portrayed by Choi Moo-sung in the 2019 SBS TV series Nokdu Flower.
- There is a statue of Jeon Bong Jun in Seoul, at the intersection of Jong-ro and Ujeongguk-ro.

== See also ==
- Cheondoism
- Donghak Peasant Revolution
- Son Byong-Hi

== Bibliography ==
- Lee, E-Hwa (2004). 이이화 선생님이 들려주는 만화 한국사 이야기 7.근대와 일제 시대 (in Korean). Vol. 7. 삼성출판사. ISBN 89-15-02541-5.
- Lee, E-Hwa (2014). 전봉준, 혁명의 기록 (in Korean). Thinking Garden. ISBN 9791185035925.
- Park, Maeng-soo (2017). "전봉준의 평화사상". 통일과 평화 (in Korean). Vol. 1 (9 ed.). The Institute for Peace and Unification Studies of Seoul National University.

=== Further reading ===
Lew, Young Ick. "The Conservative Character of the 1894 Tonghak Peasant Uprising: A Reappraisal with Emphasis on Chŏn Pong-jun's Background and Motivation." Journal of Korean Studies 7, no. 1 (1990): 149-80.
