= Park Chung-seop =

When Life Gives You Tangerines character

- When Life Gives You Tangerines character
- Kim Seon-ho as Park Chung-seop in the scene that inspired the "Kim Seon-ho Smile Challenge"
- First appearance: "The Wind Goes Whoosh, My Heart Goes Boo-Hoo"; When Life Gives You Tangerines; March 21, 2025
- Last appearance: "Here's to All You've Been Through"; When Life Gives You Tangerines; March 28, 2025
- Created by: Lim Sang-choon
- Portrayed by: Kim Seon-ho

In-universe information
- Full name: Park Chung-seop

Korean name
- Hangul: 박충섭
- RR: Bak Chungseop
- MR: Pak Ch'ungsŏp
- Nicknames: Picasso; Park Casso; Park Toto
- Gender: male
- Occupation: Painter; Art Teacher
- Family: Bun-hui (mother); Sae-bom (daughter)
- Spouse: Yang Geum-myeong (wife)
- Origin: Bongcheon-dong, Seoul
- Nationality: South Korean

Park Chung-seop (Korean: 박충섭; pronounced [pak̚.tɕʰuŋ.sʰʌp̚]) is a fictional character in the 2025 Netflix series When Life Gives You Tangerines, created by screenwriter Lim Sang-choon. Portrayed by Kim Seon-ho in a special appearance throughout Volume III and IV, he is a film poster painter and art teacher who becomes the love interest and later husband of Yang Geum-myeong (played by IU).

Despite limited screen time, the character drew significant attention due to Kim Seon-ho's performance. His wedding scene in episode 13 inspired the global "Kim Seon-ho Smile Challenge." This viral meme was cited by a Netflix Korea marketing executive as a case study in organic, audience-driven content engagement at the 2026 media conference at Yonsei University.

== Appearance ==
=== Volume III ===
Set in 1990s Seoul, Volume III of When Life Gives You Tangerines (episodes 9–12) features a subplot following the relationship between Park Chung-seop and Yang Geum-myeong (played by IU). Chung-seop is introduced as an aspiring painter and art school graduate whose strikingly disheveled appearance, with a stubbled face and shaggy hair, mirrors his artistic work as a film poster artist at the Cannes Theater.

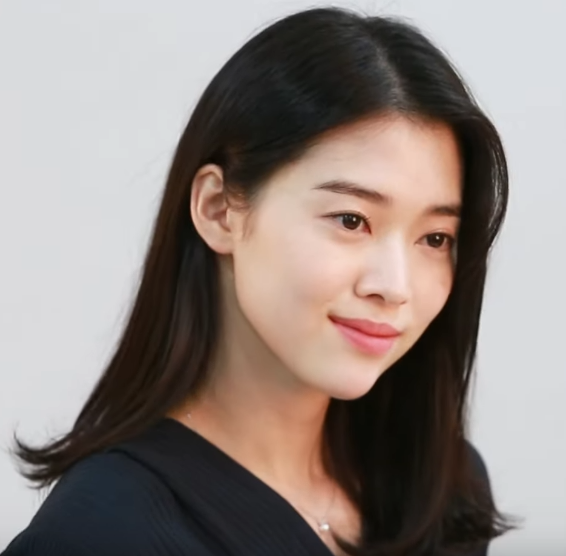
Actress Jung Yi-seo plays the character of Sung Bu-seon.

When he and Geum-myeong first cross paths in October 1990, Geum-myeong has just moved into a boarding house run by Song Yeong-sam. Around this time, Chung-seop is dating Yeong-sam's daughter, Bu-seon (played by Jung Yi-seo). Their relationship begins when Chung-seop unexpectedly begs Geum-myeong to hide him in her closet to escape Yeong-sam. A month later, he returns the favor by helping her land a part-time job selling tickets at the Cannes Theater. At the same time, Geum-myeong is dating Park Yeong-beom (played by Lee Jun-young).

Working together at the theater introduces Geum-myeong to Chung-seop's stubborn artistic idealism. Rather than arguing verbally, he quietly resists theater president Kim Hae-bong by painting strictly on his own terms. Instead of creating provocative posters for the theater's erotic film screenings, he paints the character Ong-nyeo fully clothed in a hanbok for a Byun Kang-soe poster and limits Madame Aema 4 imagery to just four horses. While these conflicts repeatedly trigger empty threats of dismissal from Hae-bong, Chung-seop simply retreats to his basement studio, earning him the nicknames "Basement Picasso" and "Park-casso," portmanteau puns playing on his surname and the legendary painter Picasso.

Their bond deepens through two pivotal events. First, when theater president Hae-bong mistakes Chung-seop's mother, Bun-hui (played by Lee Ji-hyun) for a scalper while she is admiring her son's film posters, Geum-myeong resolves the misunderstanding by gifting her a complimentary ticket to Cinema Paradiso. Grateful, Chung-seop agrees to fulfill her request for a painting. After watching the film, Bun-hui mentions a resemblance between her son and the character Toto, prompting Geum-myeong to nickname him "Park Toto." Bun-hui then gifts Geum-myeong study materials from her copy shop and asks her son to help her carry them. A second, more dramatic turning point unfolds when Geum-myeong's mother, Ae-sun, finds her daughter unconscious from coal briquette poisoning. Chung-seop rushes to her rescue, carrying her on his back to an ambulance and riding with them to the hospital. From that point on, Chung-seop becomes a steady presence in her life, frequently walking her home while carrying study materials from his mother.

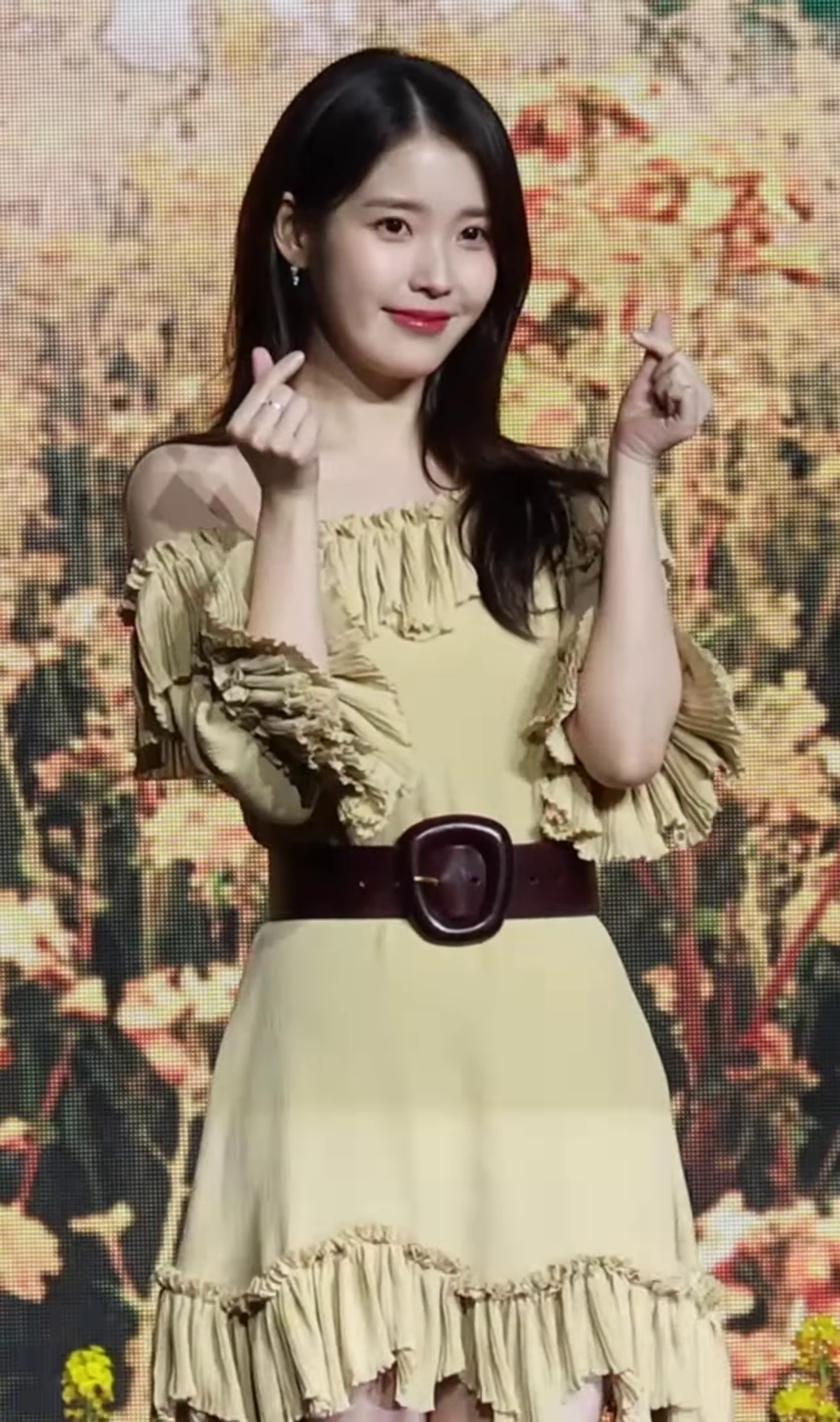
Actress IU plays the character of Yang Geum-myeong.

As 1994 drew to a close, during their final walk together, he delivers a heartfelt farewell: "Yang Geum-myeong, you are like a Christmas tree. A tree sparkles even when it is in a single-room basement apartment or standing alone in front of a failed shop. It makes your heart flutter." He quietly departs for mandatory military enlistment without saying goodbye, though he fulfills a final promise by leaving behind a portrait of her. He completes his service on January 31, 1996, and immediately spots Geum-myeong on a departing bus. He desperately tries to chase it down, only to be blocked by a surging crowd of Seo Taiji and Boys fans, setting up a cliffhanger to close out Volume III.

=== Volume IV ===
The reunion of Chung-seop and Geum-myeong forms a subplot in Volume IV (episodes 13–16), with Chung-seop appearing primarily in episode 13. His appearance is more refined, featuring cleaner grooming and improved attire. Their paths cross again during the 1997 Asian financial crisis on November 21, 1997, following the Cannes Theater's final screening of Cinema Paradiso. Spotting her once more on a departing bus, Chung-seop chases it for three stops before catching up. He later reveals that he visited the theater daily in hopes of reuniting with her.

Now both single, the two begin dating immediately. At the end of winter, Chung-seop asks Geum-myeong's family in Jeju for permission to marry her. They wed in a cathedral in August 1998. In later episodes, Chung-seop appears less frequently. In his scenes, he is depicted as a supportive husband. In episode 14, they joke about spotting his ex-girlfriend in a noodle-shop commercial, and later that same episode, they welcome their daughter, Sae-bom, on August 23, 2001, following a difficult labor. In episode 15, he appears at home with his wife, while in episode 16, he is present only through his voice and in family portraits.

== Production ==
=== Casting ===
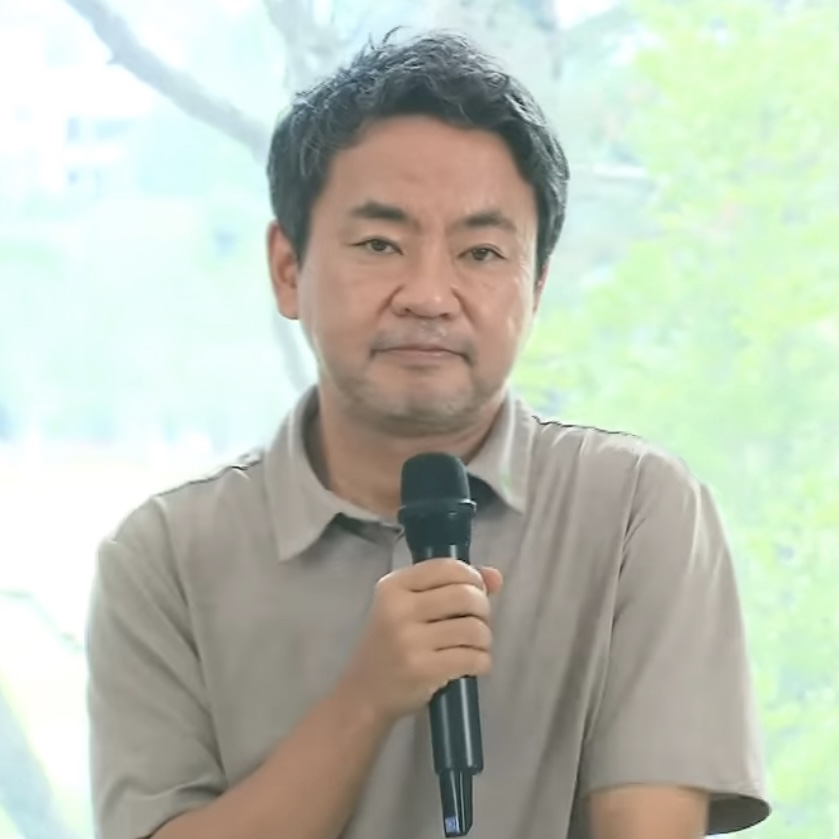
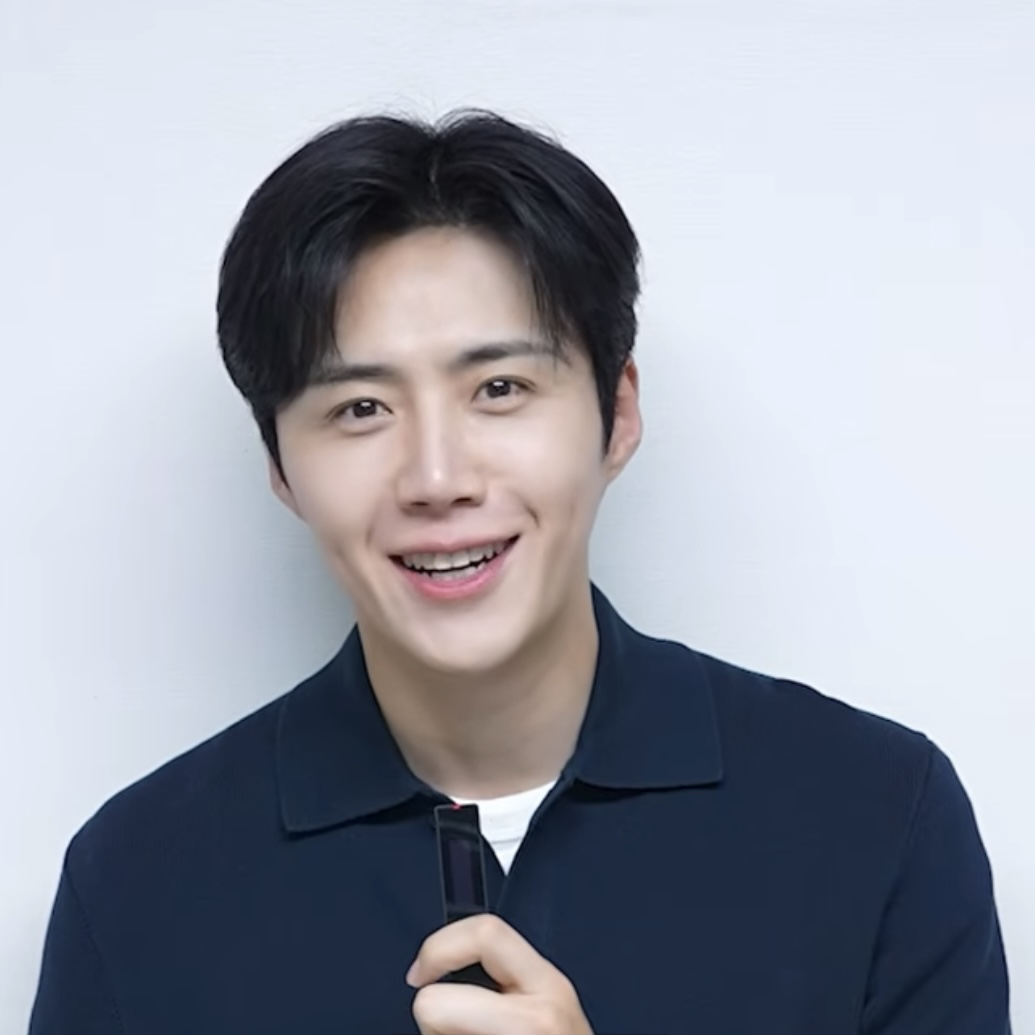
Director Kim Won-seok (left) cast actor Kim Seon-ho (right) for the role of Park Chung-seop.

In July 2023, media outlets reported on Kim Seon-ho's potential special appearance in the series. In December of the same year, while attending the 8th Asia Artist Awards in Bulacan, Philippines, Kim confirmed his involvement personally. Director Kim Won-seok deliberately withheld further information regarding his character to maintain the narrative focus. Because the series primarily centers on the lives of Ae-sun and Gwan-sik, the director feared that announcing him early would distract viewers from the core story. While Kim Seon-ho plays a significant role as Geum-myeong's husband, he is not a central driver of the overarching plot; therefore, the production utilized the common Korean practice of withholding information about a special appearance to preserve the element of surprise for the audience.

Details regarding his casting were only revealed after the series concluded. In an interview, Moon So-ri, who acted as the main protagonist Ae-sun, mentioned that Kim participated in full-cast script readings prior to the start of filming, which was held on March 7, 2023. At a promotional event for a different Netflix series, Kim explained that the director had even omitted his character from cast albums prepared for team dinners to prevent spoilers.

Regarding his reasons for joining, Kim shared that he holds great admiration for Director Kim Won-seok, noting that the story was exceptionally well-written and suited his sensibilities. He described the experience of focusing on character relationships as uniquely impactful, as it was the first time he had shed so many tears while reading a script. Because of the special nature of the appearance and the director's concern regarding potential spoilers, Kim was only provided with the scripts for 8 of the 16 episodes. While working on the series, Kim became an admirer of writer Lim Sang-choon's work, stating he had no regrets about participating in the project even before filming began.

=== Portrayal ===
Kim made his first appearance at Geum-myeong's boarding house in Bongcheon-dong. Kim noted that because Chung-seop hails from the same neighborhood where he grew up, he feels a deep sense of nostalgia. He shared that the atmosphere, scents, and environment reminded him of his own childhood, making it easy to immerse himself in the role and connect with his own parents' experiences. He remarked, "I feel as though this character was truly created for me to play."

Because Chung-seop is not articulate, Kim developed a slow, deliberate speech pattern to reflect a character who thinks carefully before speaking. He layered small habits to build character, practicing them daily to ensure they remained consistent during filming; as a result of this preparation, Kim admitted to occasionally stammering in his real life throughout the production. Kim portrayed Park Chung-seop through shifting visual styles. To achieve the aesthetic of a struggling 1990s artist, described in the script as appearing "like a hedgehog" with stubble and unkempt hair, Kim underwent a rigorous three to four-hour daily makeup process, which included applying hair extensions rather than a wig. The director and writer intentionally sought this transformation to ensure he remained unrecognizable.

During a Netflix behind-the-scenes commentary, cast members and the director praised his quick wit and meticulous approach to performance. Director Kim Won-seok highlighted that Kim Seon-ho ad-libbed the physical comedy in the drunk scene and added nuanced vocal shifts, noting, "His acting is detailed." IU, who filmed approximately ten sessions with Kim, remarked "on the palpable tension their characters consistently maintain." She also highlighted the significant technical and emotional preparation he brought to the set, noting that he developed multiple versions of individual scenes and consulted extensively with Director Kim Won-seok. Park Hae-joon described Kim as an open-minded partner who maintained a playful demeanor and frequently proposed alternative interpretations for their scenes. Ryu Seong-hie, who meticulously designed the props and set for Chung-seop shared that she and the production team speculated on the casting. Satisfied with the final choice, Ryu noted that Kim "brought Chung-seop to life perfectly."

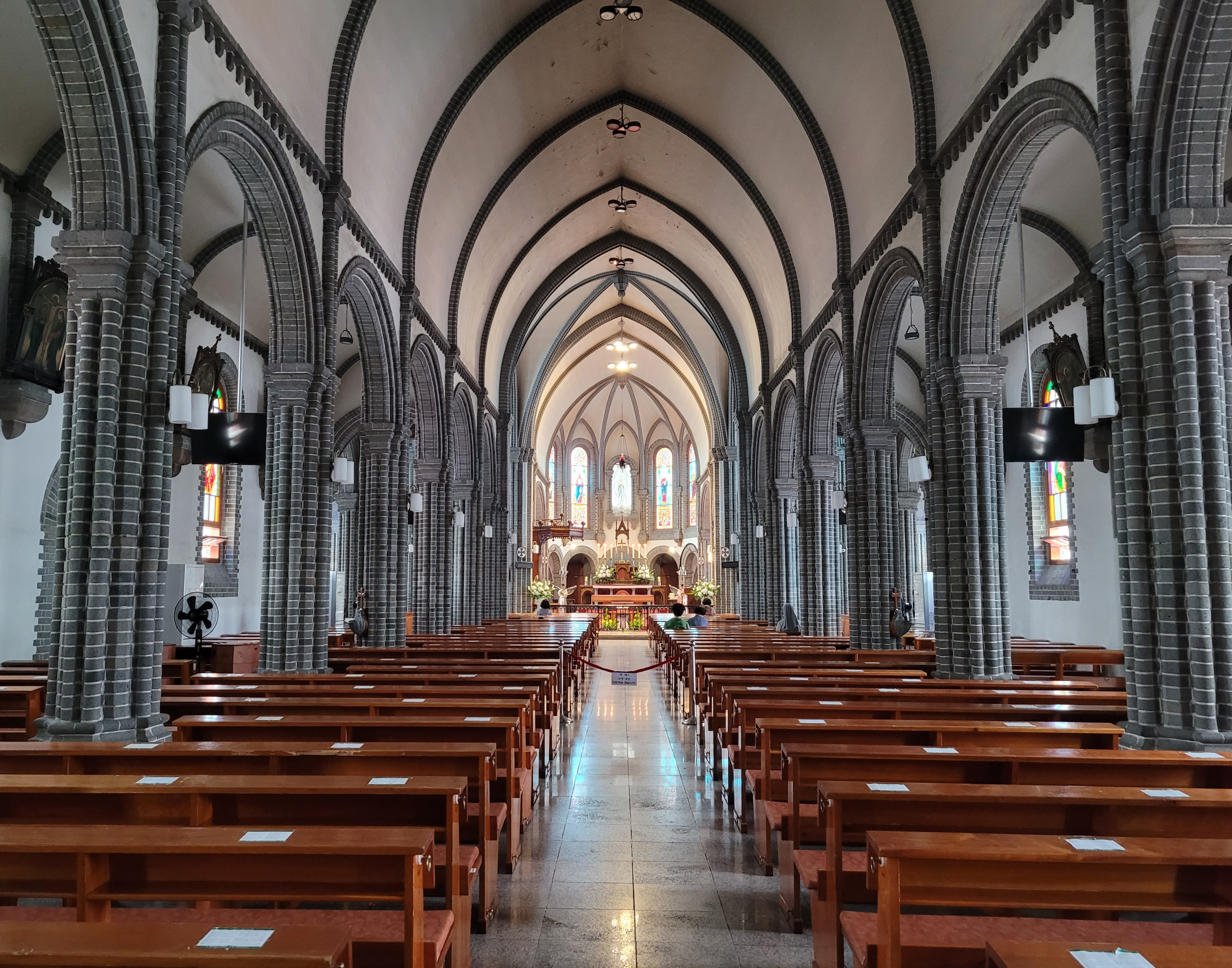
Interior of Our Lady of Lourdes Cathedral, Daegu (pictured)

Despite Kim's special appearance status, he filmed across numerous locations. For example, the Cannes Theater setting was synthesized from several locations, notably an exterior set at Hapcheon Film Park, a projection room in Jongno, the lobby and interior screening room at the Gwangju Cinema in Dong-gu, Gwangju, and indoor ticket office on set. Scenes in Geum-myeong's hometown, utilized the Andong outdoor set (Dodong-ri fishing village) and the Yeoncheon set (Hanyeo seafood restaurant). For the bus chase scenes, the production team dressed the core of Jeonju's old downtown commercial district (Jeonju Plaza, Paldal-ro, and Chunggyeong-ro) which was then enhanced via CGI, to recreate the 1990s Seoul era. The wedding scene was filmed at two locations: Gasil Catholic Church in Chilgok for the exterior and Gyesan Our Lady of Lourdes Cathedral in Daegu for the interior.

== Themes and analysis ==
Critics have highlighted several thematic layers in Park Chung-seop's narrative arc. Writing for Max Movie, Lee Hae-ri identified a critical scene when Chung-seop's attempt to reach Geum-myeong is blocked by fans of Seo Taiji and Boys. She interpreted this thwarted pursuit as a metaphor for the disruption caused by their paths crossing, equating the moment to the cultural shock of the group's sudden retirement in January 1996.

Kookmin University professor Kim Jae-joon wrote in a column for Weekly DongA that the character exists at the intersection of popular and fine art. While Chung-seop's film poster serves a commercial purpose, its inherent artistry transcends mere advertising and symbolizes the potential of the creative economy. He further contended that the character's significance lies in his refusal to merely fulfill assignments, opting instead to build a unique, independent artistic identity. Kim Hyung-ki of Securities and Economic News echoed this view, saying that Chung-seop stands out for his ability to carve his own path between commercial goals and artistic integrity. He described this as a hallmark of the K-content approach: maintaining mass appeal without losing authenticity.

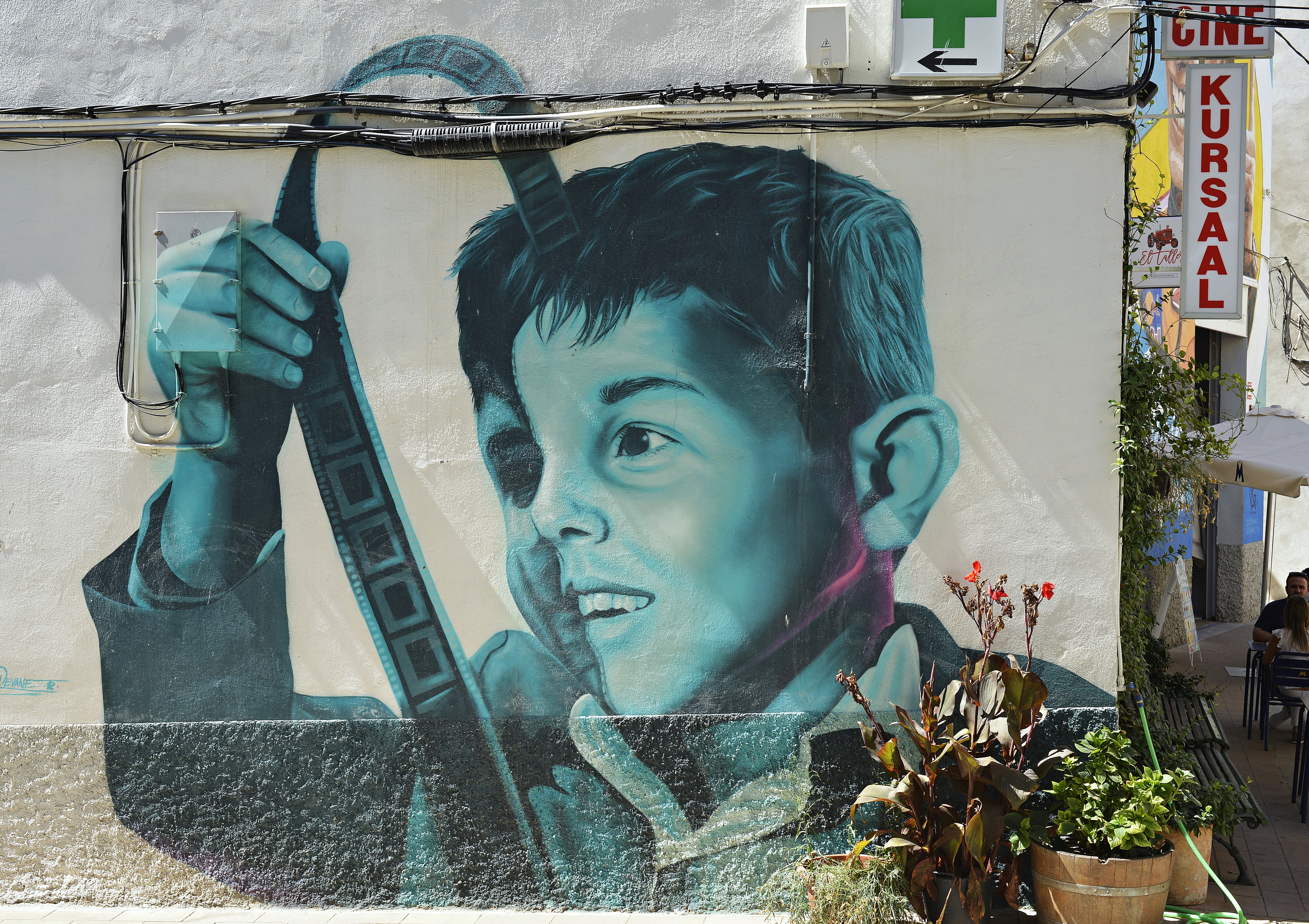
A mural of the character Toto from Cinema Paradiso painted on a wall of the restored Kursaal Cinema (pictured)

Art Insight editor Shin Dong-ha suggested that the drama uses Cinema Paradiso as a narrative device to evoke the spirit of the time. He observed that the series mirrors the film's core themes, including a relationship hindered by a class divide (the breakup between Toto and Elena). Shin also linked the closure of the Cannes Theater during the 1997 Asian financial crisis to the symbolic end of the cinema depicted in the film. Shin further draws thematic parallels between Sicily and Jeju Island, noting their shared histories of conflict: Sicily's World War II and Jeju's 1948 4·3 Incident. While Jeju's narrative often centers on ideological conflict, the series prefers to highlight local resilience, mirroring the romanticized neorealism of the film. Shin posited that Bun-hui's line to her son Chung-seop, "You are just like Toto" functions as a profound message of comfort to the people of Jeju.

== Reception and impact ==
=== Reception ===
On March 17, When Life Gives You Tangerines released an autumn poster, a Volume III trailer, and a second set of press stills. The poster captured attention by featuring a man, shown only from the back, greeting middle-aged Oh Ae-soon and Yang Gwan-sik alongside their daughter, Geum-myeong. While the series established a romance between Geum-myeong and Young-beom, these materials implied a more complex narrative. Netizens identified the man in the poster as Park Chung-seop, sparking speculation that Kim Seon-ho had been cast in the role. This ignited intense debate over Geum-myeong's eventual husband and popularized the term "Eonamseop," a portmanteau meaning "the husband is Chung-seop."

During a promotional event for a different Netflix project, comedian Yoo Byung-jae remarked that he had inquired about the man featured in the posters, only to be denied information due to the production's strict security measures. Yoo admitted that he remained uncertain of the actor's identity throughout the initial episodes. Kim expressed his satisfaction with the audience's failure to recognize him, noting that it validated the extensive daily makeup process required for his transformation. Initially appearing disheveled with stubble and unkempt hair at the beginning of Volume III, the character's look left many viewers, including his own fans, unable to identify the actor. Following the character's military discharge at the end of Volume III, his appearance transitioned to a formal, polished style, coinciding with his romantic arc with Geum-myeong. During these episodes, viewers frequently compared his demeanor and appearance to Geum-myeong's father, Yang Gwan-sik.

Despite limited screen time, Kim's portrayal received positive reception for his emotional and comedic range. Critics described his performance as a "hidden card" that improved narrative immersion, marking his return to the romance genre. This success was also reflected in industry metrics: in the third week of March 2025, Kim ranked tenth on Good Data Corporation's "TV-OTT Drama Performer Buzzworthiness" list and second on "Top 10 Drama Cast Keywords," rising to third in the following week. He also ranked second on the "Top 10 Drama Cast Keywords" list in the third week of March and placing fourth in the first week of April.

=== K-content trickle-down effect ===
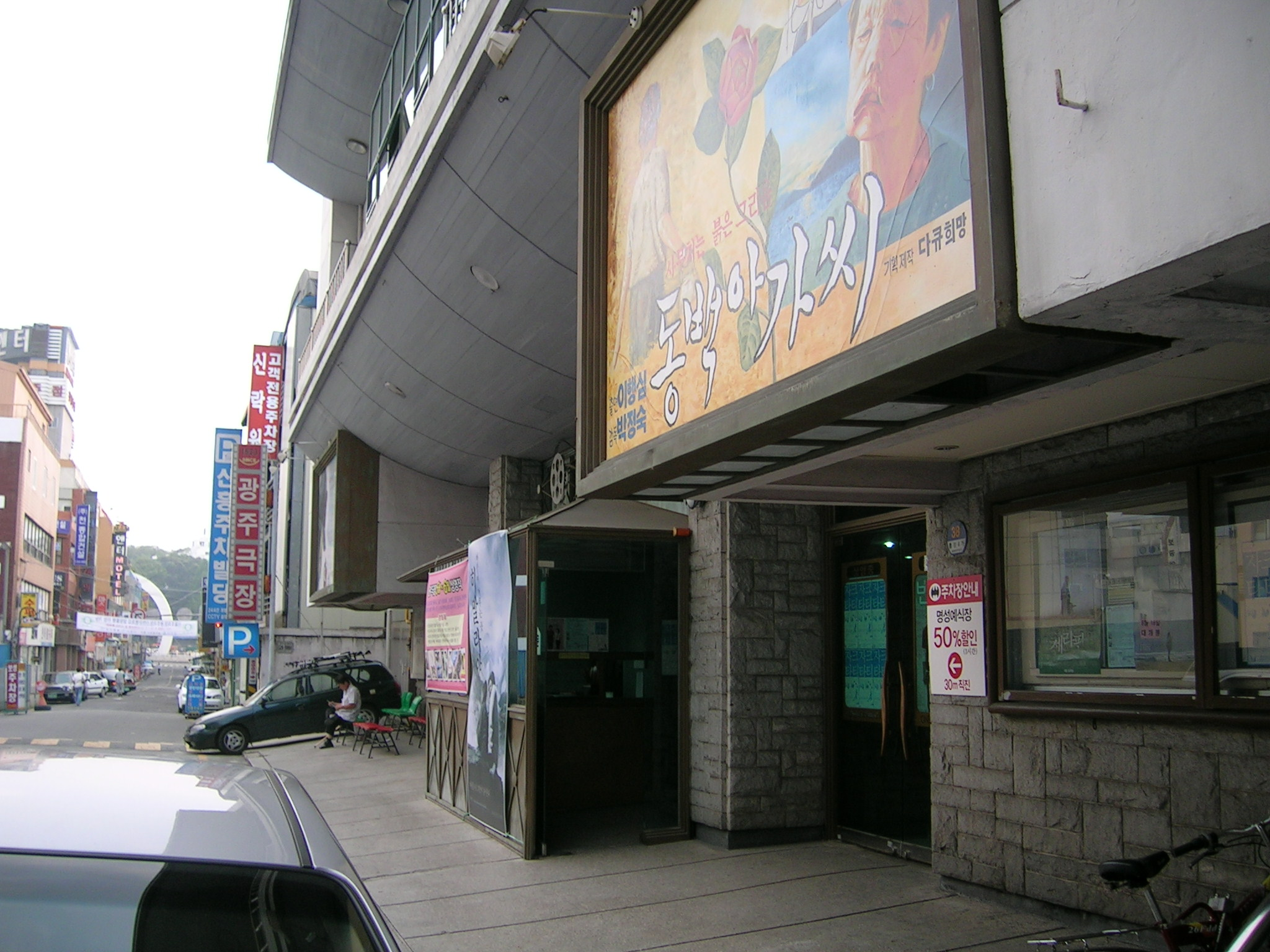
Gwangju Cinema, Dong-gu, Gwangju (pictured)

The narrative arc involving Yang Geum-myeong and Park Chung-seop has become one of drivers of set-jetting. By spring 2025, tourism at Gasil Catholic Church surged. Chilgok Mayor Kim Jae-wook noted the drama helped highlight the site's cultural value, prompting plans for a commemorative marker and fan photo events. By September 2025, church officials reported triple the usual autumn attendance. The Gwangju Cinema, the oldest single-screen cinema in Korea, also experienced a significant influx of tourists.Yonhap News presented it as a case study of K-content trickle-down effect. Dong-gu Mayor Im Taek expressed pride that Gwangju Cinema reached a global audience via Netflix. He pledged ongoing support to ensure the historic cultural landmark remain a vibrant destination for visitors.

Jeonju, which hosted filming for the 1990s Seoul setting in episode 12, is also positioning itself as an international film industry hub. In 2024, the city partnered with New Zealand's Kumeu Film Studio to establish the second Kumeu Film Studios in Asia along with a virtual production facility. Furthermore, the city announced that they would invest 575 billion won ($413 million) into Jeonju, with the intention of making it a global film and video industry center by 2034.

=== Cross-media influence ===
Yang Geum-myeong and Park Chung-seop's love story has served as a primary driver for renewed interest in Giuseppe Tornatore's film Cinema Paradiso in South Korea. Capitalizing on this, a special Cinema Paradiso Original Film Concert was held at the Mapo Arts Center's Art Hall Mac on Saturday, June 21, 2025. The event featured a screening of the film paired with a live orchestral performance of Ennio Morricone's iconic score by the Seoul Philharmonic Orchestra, conducted by Park Min-kyu. Guitarist Denis Sung-ho appeared as a special guest. To mark its 35th domestic anniversary, Cinema Paradiso returned to South Korean theaters on July 2, 2025; the film originally premiered in Italy in 1988 before its 1990 Korean release.

Independently of the series, the Cinema Paradiso immersive special exhibition "To. Toto" was organized to commemorate the 140th anniversary of diplomatic relations between Korea and Italy. A collaboration between Soop International, the Cross Media Group, and the media company Sanghwa, the exhibition was originally scheduled to run from December 20, 2024, through March 31, 2025. Volume III of the series featuring the film premiered on March 21, while the exhibition was in progress, and following a subsequent surge in interest, the exhibition was extended through May 11, 2025.

=== The "Kim Seon-ho Smile Challenge" ===
The wedding scene in Episode 13, in which Chung-seop reacts to seeing his bride, Geum-myeong, by clutching his chest, feigning a faint, winking, and smiling, triggered a trend known as the "Kim Seon-ho Smile Challenge." The trend began on Chinese social media platforms, gaining momentum as actors like Bai Lu, Chen Feiyu, and Yan An participated. By April 2025, it amassed over 170 million views on Douyin and 1 million likes on Xiaohongshu.

Following a viral TikTok edit, featuring Ariana Grande's song "Supernatural" which garnered over 22 million views and 2 million likes, the challenge spread globally. Due to its viral nature, it also drew participation from celebrities and influencers across the Philippines, Indonesia, and beyond, as well as propelling the song back onto the music charts. In May, Grande shared a compilation featuring the original scene and a selection of fan-made clips on her Instagram. Capitalizing on the momentum, Netflix India released a reel comparing Kim Seon-ho's smile with Shah Rukh Khan's iconic moment in Om Shanti Om. The reels went on to make the Top 20 list of the most-viewed Instagram reels.

Kim admitted that he was initially in disbelief at the global scale of the trend until Grande participated. He clarified that the scene was not an ad-lib; the script explicitly called for his character to playfully react as if struck by a gunshot and smile, and the natural chemistry between him and IU allowed the scene to naturally unfold. He described the experience of witnessing fans recreating his performance as strange, new, and deeply moving. He later included the challenge into his 2026 Asia Tour due to sustained fan demand.

The phenomenon has since been utilized as a model for modern digital marketing strategies. Writing for the Indonesian marketing portal Redcomm, Nur Priyanto published a case study dissecting the trend. The analysis outlines five steps for brands, illustrating how the calculated adoption of organic consumer trend can effectively optimize audience engagement metrics. The challenge was further cited as an example of organic, fandom-driven marketing during a major media industry conference titled "The Global Expansion of K-Content Led by Netflix, the Effect of Korean Tourism, and New Networks." Netflix Korea Marketing Director Kim Mi-hoo cited the trend to explain the company's shift away from traditional advertising toward a strategy centered on "global fandom building." Kim emphasized that facilitating widespread global conversation rather than deploying standard commercial media is he primary driver behind K-content's global presence. Held on June 30, 2026, the event was organized as a collaborative initiative between the K-Entertech Hub and Yonsei University (School of Media and Communication and the Institute for Communication Research).
