= Gwangju International Film Festival =

Annual film festival in South Korea

Coordinates: 35°09′55″N 126°50′55″E

- Location: Gwangju, South Korea
- Founded: 7 December 2001; 24 years ago
- Most recent: 2015
- Awards: Children's Show and others
- No. of films: 100 in 2015
- Language: International
- Website: www.giff.org

Current: 15th
- 16th 14th

Gwangju International Film Festival is an international film festival that takes place in Gwangju, South Korea. The festival was first held from 12/7/2001 to 12/14/2001 at Gwangju Cinema, Mudeung Theater, Jaeil Cinema, and Cine City. The festival was held annually in various venues within the city until it was indefinitely postponed in 2016. It was originally a non-competitive film festival and it was partially converted into a competitive film festival in 2002. The main focus of the festival is to introduce movies that are critically acclaimed but have not been introduced to South Korea and to lay a cultural groundwork by grafting the cultural heritage of Jeollanam-Do together with movie as a new cultural code. It also intends to bring awareness to important historical events such as Gwangju Uprising through films.

From 2001 to 2015, the festival has experienced multiple issues including lack of audiences, technological issues regarding the sound system, and movies being cancelled. The festival was eventually indefinitely postponed in 2016 when an internal conflict within the organizing committee occurred between the chairman and the executive director. The conflict occurred in regards to the settlement of revenue from previous year's film festival and this has threatened the funding of the festival, which caused the festival to be indefinitely postponed 2 months prior to the opening. 500 films from 25 countries in Europe and Asia were received by the organizing committee before it was postponed. Currently, as of 2023, the festival remains postponed.

== History ==
- 1st Gwangju International Film Festival, 2001.12.7 ~ 2001.12.14

Films screened: 140 films from 26 countries
Opening Film: L'Emploi du temps, Laurent Cantet, France
Closing Film: This is Law, Byeongjin Min, South Korea

- 2nd Gwangju International Film Festival, 2002.10.25 ~ 2002.10.31

Films screened: 203 films from 30 countries
Opening Film: Unborn but Forgotten, Im Chang-jae, South Korea
Closing Film: Welcome to Collinwood, Anthony and Joe Russo, US

- 3rd Gwangju International Film Festival, 2003.8.22 ~ 2003.8.31

Films screened: 212 films from 31 countries
Opening Film: Spring, Summer, Fall, Winter...and Spring
Closing Film: That Day

- 4th Gwangju International Film Festival, 2004.9.2 ~ 2004.9.11

Films screened: 120 films from 23 countries
Opening Film: Loved Gun
Closing Film: Road

- 5th Gwangju International Film Festival, 2005.08.26 ~ 2005.09.04

Films screened: 180 films from 33 countries
Opening Film: Hands In The Hair
Closing Film: A Stranger Of Mine

- 6th Gwangju International Film Festival, 2006.12.14 ~ 2006.12.18

Films screened: 49 films from 13 countries
Opening Film: A Long Walk
Closing Film: Junebug

- 7th Gwangju International Film Festival, 2007.11.28 ~ 2007.12.3

Films screened: 40 films
Opening Film: Western Trunk Line
Closing Film: Los Borgia

- 8th Gwangju International Film Festival, 2008.12.4 ~ 2008.12.8

Films screened: 40 films
Opening Film: Thick As Thieves
Closing Film: Vitus

- 9th Gwangju International Film Festival, 2009.09.16 ~ 2009.09.20

Films screened: 50 films from 10 countries
Opening Film: Penguins In The Sky - Asahiyama Zoo
Closing Film: The Piano Forest

- 10th Gwangju International Film Festival, 2010.12.09 ~ 2010.12.12

Films screened: 40 films
Opening Film: O' Horten
Closing Film: Chef's Special

- 11th Gwangju International Film Festival, 2011.10.27 ~ 2011.10.31

Films screened: 60 films
Opening Film: People Mountain People Sea
Closing Film: Offside

- 12th Gwangju International Film Festival, 2012.11.08 ~ 2012.11.12

Films screened: 60 films
Opening Film: Leona Calderon
Closing Film: Aung San Suu Kyi, lady of no fear

- 13th Gwangju International Film Festival, 2013.08.29 ~ 2013.09.02

Films screened: 91 films from 24 countries
Opening Film: Sweet Heart Chocolate
Closing Film: Stable Life

- 14th Gwangju International Film Festival, 2014.08.28 ~ 2014.09.01

Films screened: 92 films from 25 countries
Opening Film: Late Spring
Closing Film: WEST

- 15th Gwangju International Film Festival, 2015.05.14 ~ 2015.05.18

Films screened: 103 films from 31 countries
Opening Film: Test
Closing Film: Flying Home

== Awards ==
Kim Daejung Nobel Peace Film Award

No.	Year	Name
1	2011	Jafar Panahi
2	2012	Chung Ji-Young
3	2013	Đặng Nhật Minh
4	2014	Kim Dong-Won

Excellent Asia-Pacific Young Director Award

No.	Year	Name
1st Place	2015	Children's Show
2nd Place	2015	My Mandala
3rd Place	2015	Morning Boy!

Audience Award

No.	Year	Name
1	2004	Hou Yong
2	2005	Davide Ferrario

== See also ==
- List of festivals in South Korea
- List of festivals in Asia
- Culture of South Korea
