= Son Hong-kyu =

South Korean writer (born 1975)

- Born: 1975 (age 50–51); Jeongeup, North Jeolla Province
- Education: Dongguk University
- Occupation: Writer

Korean name
- Hangul: 손홍규
- Hanja: 孫洪奎
- RR: Son Honggyu
- MR: Son Honggyu

Son Hong-kyu (Korean: 손홍규; born 1975) is a South Korean writer.

== Life ==
Son Hong-kyu was born in 1975 in Jeongeup, North Jeolla Province. He graduated in Korean literature from Dongguk University. He began his literary career when he won the Writer's World New Writer's Award in 2001. He was awarded the Daesan Creative Fund in 2004, and the National Arts Fund in 2005. He has also won the 5th Violet People's Fiction Award in 2008.

== Writing ==
The special characteristic of Son's fiction is his serious exploration of the world, and people. It is easy to think strangely of saying that a certain writer's characteristic is about the sincere examination of the world and people, because in fiction that is such an obvious thing to do. However, the reason why that is a characteristic of Son's writing is that it is so obvious. The fact that fiction's sincerity is obvious means that the tradition of such sincerity is that much old, and that it is becoming considered as worn out or outdated. To the generation of Son, who was born in 1975, what is important to fiction is not quite sincerity, but wit, experimentation, and uncommon sensations. Therefore, Son's sincerity can actually be his unique characteristic. Literary critic Shin Hyeong-cheol has said of Son that, on the contrary to the current trend of postmodernist theme of death, whether of a person or a subject, "his works honestly show frustration and scars, and his lines are keen with the struggle for finding a reason for new hope". He has added that his works "toss and turn with the anger against the inhuman world, and the affection for humanity", that "he is a writer who is able to lean on the old hope that only people can shed tears."

It is said that the characteristic of Son's fiction is serious study into the world and man, but it is not that his fiction only uses the old writing methods of realism. Son's fiction includes what almost every person would consider as 'inhuman imagination'. In Saramui sinhwa (사람의 신화 The Legend of Humans), the protagonist 'I' does not think that he is a human, and thus can only talk with things that are not human, such as his dead grandfather, his nephew in his sister's belly who isn't actually human yet, and a snake that hides away in order to become a dragon. In "Geomi" (거미 The Spider), the 'I' is also not a person. Between an incompetent and violent father, a mother suffering from hardships of life, and a sister who is raped by her father's creditor, 'I' begins to remember that she was actually a spider, and begins to break away. Though inhuman imagination, Son depicts how the great violence of the world is defiling life of its decency, and that within that setting, people are reproducing the violence of the world, therefore asking the following: is it really that valuable to be a human?

== Works ==
- Geu namja-ui gachul (그 남자의 가출 The Man Who Ran Away From Home), 2015.
- Dajeonghan pyeongyeon (다정한 편견 The Kind Prejudice), 2015.
- Kim Dae-jung (김대중), 2014.
- Seoul (서울), 2014.
- Tomeun tomgwa jatda (톰은 톰과 잤다 Tom Slept With Tom), 2012.
- The Muslim Butcher (이슬람 정육점), 2010.
- Cheongnyeonuisa janggiryeo (청년의사 장기려 Jang Gi-ryeo the Young Doctor), 2008.
- Bongseopi garasadae (봉섭이 가라사대 Bongseop Says), 2008.
- Gwisinui sidae (귀신의 시대 The Age of Ghosts), 2006.
- Saramui sinhwa (사람의 신화 The Legend of Humans), 2005.

=== Works in translation ===
- Baska Topraklarda Rüzgar Sert Eser (Turkish)
- Tuesday River (English)
- The Muslim Butcher (English)

== Awards ==
- Chae Man-sik Literary Award, 2016.
- Oh Yeongsu Literary Award, 2013.
- Baek Shin-ae Literature Prize, 2013.
- Violet People's Fiction Award, 2008.
