= Chung-seop =

- Hangul: 충섭
- RR: Chungseop
- MR: Ch'ungsŏp

Chung-seop (Korean: 충섭) is a Korean given name. Notable people and fictional characters with the name include:

- Park Chung-seop, fictional character in the 2025 Netflix series When Life Gives You Tangerines
- Song Chung-seop, South Korean film director, screenwriter, novelist, critic, and professor
