= Gobu Revolt =

1894 Donghak Peasant Revolution conflict

- Part of Donghak Peasant Revolution
Date	January 11, 1894
Location	Gobu, Jeolla, Korea
Result	Rebel victory

Belligerents
Donghak Peasant Army	Kingdom of Joseon: Joseon Army

Commanders and leaders
Jeon Bong-jun	Jo Byung-gap

Strength
1,000 peasants	Unknown

The Gobu Revolt (Korean: 고부 민란) was the initial uprising that occurred in Gobu, Jeolla Province, erupted in January 1894 (the 31st year of King Gojong's reign) during the Joseon Dynasty. It was fueled by the anger of the local farmers against the exploitative practices of the county magistrate, Jo Byung-gap. While the causes and processes of the Gobu Revolt were similar to other uprisings during the late Joseon Dynasty, the significance lies in the fact that the leaders and the people were able to elevate it to a higher level of peasant uprising through their experiences with previous uprisings. The Gobu Revolt was not a spontaneous or impulsive event but a planned movement with clear objectives initiated by the Donghak local leaders, including Jeon Bong-jun, as part of the anti-feudal and anti-foreign movement that emerged mainly among the Donghak peasant farmers after the Boeun Assembly in March 1893. The Gobu Revolt became a catalyst for the development of the Donghak Peasant Revolution throughout Jeolla Province.

== Background ==
In the late Joseon period, rural areas were completely exposed to the predatory system of the ruling class. The discontent among the peasants grew as a result of political corruption, widespread bribery, and extreme corruption among the officials. Under such contradictory circumstances, any region was poised to explode into rebellion given the right circumstances.

Jeolla Province was the most extensive plain and fertile land in the southern part of Korea. As a result, the central government heavily relied on Jeolla Province for its finances, and it was also the region where the royal family had the most land and properties compared to other regions. Therefore, the imposition of taxes and exploitation by officials dispatched from the central government, as well as the excessive levies and exactions, were more severe in Jeolla Province than in any other region, burdening the peasants with double or triple the hardships.

Gobu was one of the most prosperous villages in Jeolla Province, known as a granary for rice. Situated along the Dongjin River and connecting the fertile plains of Gimje and Mankyeong, Gobu was a granary encompassing 28 villages in the surrounding area. Additionally, there were four ports—Julp'o, Yeomso, Dongjin, and Sap'o—near Gobu, from where a considerable amount of rice was exported to various regions. Particularly, Julp'o on the western side of Gobu, located about 20 ri away, was the center of tax collection and rice transportation along with Bupyeong's Bubseongpo. Consequently, Gobu County had a higher possibility of exploitation than any other region, and the actual plundering by the ruling class was severe. In particular, the plundering by Gobu County Magistrate Jo Byeong-gap, Juntian Commissioner Kim Chang-seok, and Transportation Commissioner Jo Bibyung was unparalleled.

== Oppression in Gobu ==
In 1892, Jo Byeong-gap, who had gained a notorious reputation for his corrupt practices while serving as a local official in various regions, was appointed as the magistrate of Gobu County. From 1893 onwards, Jo Byeong-gap began revealing his true nature of corruption.

When Jeon was captured at the end of the revolution, Jeon gave a detailed account of Jo's misdeeds:

- He built Manseokbo reservoir under the already existing Min Reservoir (now Yedeung Reservoir) and took water taxes from the peasants, two sacks of rice for using the upper reservoir and a sack of rice for using the lower reservoir. He collected seven hundred sacks of rice in total.
- He promised that peasants who farmed abandoned land would be exempt from taxes for five years, but he forced them to pay taxes in the autumn of 1893.
- He fined affluent peasants for dubious crimes, including 'infidelity', 'lack of harmony', 'adultery', and 'needless talents', by which he collected 20,000 nyang (nyang was a unit of Korean currency, equivalent to seventy US dollars, making 20,000 nyang equivalent 1.4 million U.S. dollars).
- He taxed a thousand nyang (the equivalent of 700,000 US dollars) to build a monument to his father, Jo Hugyun, who had been the magistrate of Taein.
- For sacks of rice to send to the government, he sent only sacks of spoiled rice to Seoul, taking unspoiled sacks for himself.
- While he was building the reservoir, he heedlessly cut down trees centuries old and did not give any wages to the workers.

Of these, the construction of Manseokbo reservoir caused the most fury. Yedeung Reservoir had caused the Baedeul fields to not suffer from starvation ever since Yedeung was built. However, the construction of the new reservoir blocked creeks in the region, causing widespread damage through flooding.

The exploitation by Juntian Commissioner Kim Chang-seok was also unbearable for the people of Gobu County. The Yeonhae region in Honam had suffered from poor harvests due to natural disasters almost every year since the mid-1870s. Especially in 1893, most areas of Honam experienced a severe drought, resulting in a near-total failure of crops that year. The Joseon government, unable to afford the loss of peasants leaving their hometowns, dispatched officials to persuade and force peasants to cultivate fallow lands. Kim Chang-seok, as a Honam Juntian Commissioner, promised tax exemption for several years to the peasants who reclaimed fallow lands. However, as soon as the harvest season arrived, he started collecting taxes just like the previous year, even if the peasants had left the land fallow. This was essentially no different from imposing a land tax, which further intensified the resistance of the already impoverished peasants. It was no coincidence that the peasants from the northern rural areas, which had suffered greatly from natural disasters, actively participated in the uprising.

Zhao Biyong, the Transportation Commissioner, was no less corrupt. Since the establishment of the Jeonun system in 1886, which involved the transportation of crops by ships, the introduction of the crop transportation system by foreign ships disrupted the traditional methods of transportation. In 1893, with the establishment of Gongmi Transportation Company, the taxes imposed on ship repairs and damages, as well as other miscellaneous taxes, further fueled the grievances of the peasants towards the Jeonun Company, led by Jo Pil-yeong. Jo Pil-yeong responded to the peasants' resistance by capturing and torturing them, pulling out their beards or branding them with scars. In fact, the peasants' initial complaints during the Donghak Peasant Revolution were directed towards the Jeonun Company, indicating the corrupt practices of the new system. The issue of crop transportation was not limited to a single county but was a common problem in various counties in Jeolla Province.

== Revolt ==
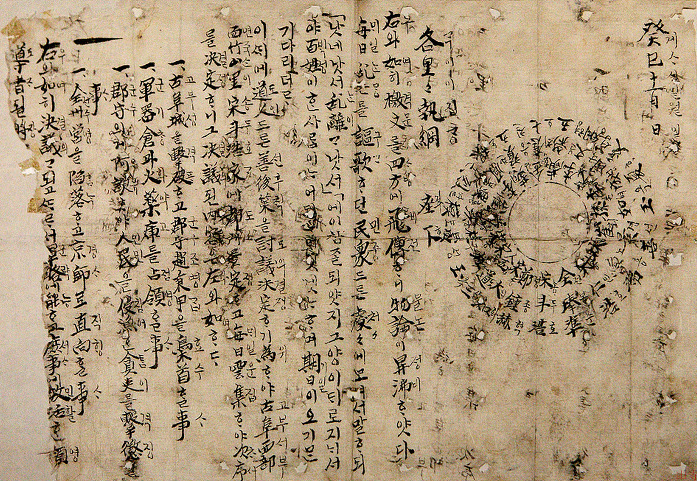
Sabal Tongmun code, made by twenty rebels of Jeongeub, Gobu, and Taein, including Jeon Bong-jun

In this context, in November 1893, Donghak believers and angered peasants began forming a rebel army. They used the Sabal Tongmun, in which names were written around a circular cone as to form a circle. The Sabal Tongmun made the leader of the writers unclear (because it was impossible to know who had signed their name first). When the "Sapotongmun" (a secret document circulated among the masses) began circulating, people gathered in various places and expressed their frustration, saying, "Things are getting worse and worse. We can't tolerate this anymore. We can't continue living like this. How can the people survive?" They were eagerly waiting for a rebellion to break out.

On the early morning of January 11, 1894, more than a thousand uprising peasants gathered at the Malmok Market and proclaimed Jeon Bong-jun as their leader. They divided into two groups, broke through the three gates of Gobu Township, and marched towards the Gobu government office. One group passed through Yeongwon Unhakdong, while the other group crossed Cheonchijae and stormed the Gobu government office without much difficulty. It was said that "the camp was calm and the orders were clear, unlike the typical 'stone-flag army' (a term used in Japan to describe uprisings of peasants using stones as weapons)." Jo Byeong-gap, who noticed the assault by the uprising peasants, quickly fled through the back gate and over the fence. He hid in the house of Jin Sun-ma, a signboard maker in Ipseok-ri, and then disguised himself and hastily fled to Jeonju Garrison via Jeongeup and Sunchang (he was exiled after the war ended, and returned from his exile to become a judge). For a week, the people brought out the officials of the Yicheong and severely punished them, destroyed the warehouse and distributed the grain, confiscated about 1,400 sacks of grain collected by Jinjeon, returned taxed and fined property to original owners, and demolishing the reservoir built under the Manseok Road. Despite achieving the demands they had been seeking, the uprising did not dissolve and continued for a long time in an organized manner precisely because there was a leader.

== Building an army ==
After dealing with the affairs of the government office for about a week, they moved their main forces to Mahangjang and left some troops in the township. During this time, the uprising peasants set up their camp in the town and lit bonfires at night. Six days later, on January 17, they moved their camp back to Malmok Market. At this time, the elderly and infirm were all sent back, and only young men formed the uprising army. A peasant army under a unified command was formed.

=== Struggling to gain support ===
On January 25, they relocated their entire army to the fortress at Baeksan. Jeon Bong-jun urged the common people to "advance to Hamyeol and overthrow Jeon Un-yeong and arrest Jeon Pil-yeong." However, the chaos did not unfold solely according to Jeon Bong-jun's intentions. The overall sentiment of the common people did not agree with the notion of a "rebellion" that deviated from the general characteristics of the chaos. The common people did not respond, as they believed that when civilian disturbances escalate, they are labeled as rebels. Thus, the outbreak of the Gobu Rebellion was an explosion that occurred when Jeon Bong-jun, who had the plans for the rebellion, was inadequately prepared. The fact that the neighboring villages did not respond also played a significant role in the failure of the Gobu Rebellion to unfold as intended by Jeon Bong-jun. To implement the "sabal-tongmun" plan, it was not possible for Gobu Township alone to carry it out; it required the support of neighboring villages. Jeon Bong-jun had been consistently seeking coordination with neighboring villages. However, as the outbreak of the Gobu Rebellion was not prearranged with neighboring villages, there was no organized support or coordination.

=== Conceptual gap ===
There was a conceptual gap between the spontaneously occurring "refugees" and the leadership, who had premeditated plans, and there was no prior coordination. Conflict between the leadership and the common people emerged from the early stages of the chaos. When they occupied government warehouses and divided the stored grains among themselves, the common people stated, "We will return now that our demands have been met." Therefore, the common people sought to disband. However, as the leadership had premeditated plans, they could not tolerate such a sentiment. Jeon Bong-jun could not remain uninvolved when the chaos erupted, but due to the lack of preparation, conflicts arose between the leadership and the common people, and there was no response from neighboring villages. Jeon Bong-jun threatened or persuaded the common people who wanted to disband, saying, "Since you have consumed official rice, you are guilty of a capital offense. Let us strive to live together." As a result, they entered a state of stalemate. Although the peasant army retreated from the government offices, they did not disband and instead established their base in a horse market.

To resolve this conceptual gap between the leadership and the common people, Jeon Bong-jun utilized intermediate bodies such as village leaders and local officials. "They (Jeon Bong-jun and others) did not restrict the responsibility to themselves alone, but also assigned the same responsibility to village leaders and local officials of each village. Therefore, when things went wrong in the morning, even the village leaders and local officials of the 18 administrative districts would bear the same responsibility. As a result, the unity of the people increased without causing mass exodus or dissatisfaction." However, the division between the leadership and the common people could not be resolved, and when Park Won-myeong took office as the newly appointed military governor, the common people disbanded.

At this time, the blunders made by the government envoy, Lee Yong-tae, further provoked the peasant soldiers. Jeon Bong-jun sent out messages in all directions, and after the uprising in Baeksan on March 21, they entered a full-scale war. The news spread, and peasant from various villages gathered under the command of Jeon Bong-jun, preparing for all-out warfare.

== Analysis ==
There is a view that the Gobu Uprising was systematically planned and organized by leaders such as Jeon Bong-jun. However, the outbreak of the uprising itself appears to have started similarly to other uprisings during the late Joseon period. According to the Haktong, the Gobu Uprising was caused by the people of the entire region enduring and enduring until they could no longer endure, and finally "causing a disturbance". Therefore, from the beginning, it was the action of the Gobu peasants alone. In Hwang Hyeon's "Woo Ha Gi Bun," it is also mentioned that "the common people could not bear it and gathered thousands of people to make a genuine appeal, but Jeon Bong-jun fled to Jeonju". In Li Bok-yong's "Record of Southern Travel," it is described that "at first, the Gobu peasants gathered outside the government office to express their grievances. There were only a few people, but as the rumors spread, more people gathered and formed a crowd. Jeon Bong-jun jumped into the crowd and incited them, leading to the development of the uprising".

However, what distinguished the Gobu Uprising from other uprisings was the involvement of a leader named Jeon Bong-jun in a naturally occurring uprising. In other words, the resentment of the Gobu peasants towards Jo Byeong-gap naturally led to the outbreak of the uprising, and as a result, when the gathered Gobu peasants proclaimed Jeon Bong-jun as their leader, Jeon Bong-jun, who had been waiting for the right moment as seen in the Sasal Tongmun plan, decided to take advantage of the natural unrest of the Gobu peasants to incite a rebellion, even though his preparations were inadequate. Jeon Bong-gun stated in court that he became the leader of the uprising because the common people recognized his knowledge, but he did not become the leader of the uprising simply by being passively pushed into that position. Jeon Bong-jun had a long-standing plan called the "Sasal Tongmun" to achieve the great task of "assisting the world and comforting the people." During the trial, when asked why he incited the uprising when he had not suffered much damage from Jo Byeong-gap, he openly stated, "The world's affairs have deteriorated to the point where it was necessary for someone to save the world," indicating that it was not just a personal problem of Jo Byeong-gap, but rather Jeon Bong-jun had already acquired a broader consciousness of "the people" and "the world" as a leader. Therefore, unlike other uprisings in the past, the Gobu Uprising was able to develop into a peasant war.

== See also ==
- Donghak Peasant Revolution
- Jeon Bong-jun

== Specific books ==
- Yi, Yihwa (2012). 동학농민운동(평등과 자주를 외친) [The Donghak Peasant Revolution: Claiming for Equality and Statehood] (in Korean). illustrated by Kim Tae-hyun. Seoul: Safari. p. 327. ISBN 9788-9648-0765-1.
- Yu, Hongjun (유홍준) (2011b). 산은 강을 넘지 못 하고 [Mountains Cannot Cross Rivers]. 나의 문화 유산 답사기 [Exploring my Cultural Heritage] (in Korean). Vol. 2. Changbi. pp. 1–466. ISBN 9788-9364-7202-3.
