= Lee E-Hwa =

Korean historian

- 이이화
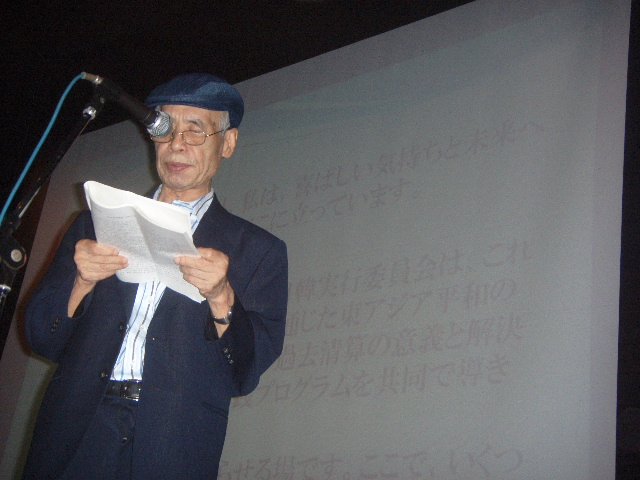
- Lee in 2010
- Born: August 23, 1937; Daegu, Korea, Empire of Japan
- Died: March 18, 2020 (aged 82); Seoul, South Korea
- Occupations: Historian, writer
- Years active: 1980–2020 (as a writer)
- Spouse: Kim Young-hui
- Children: Lee Eung-il, Lee Eung-so
- Parent(s): Lee Dal, Park Sun-geum

Lee E-Hwa (Korean: 이이화; Hanja: 李離和; RR: I Ihwa; August 23, 1937 – March 18, 2020) was a Korean historian. He was the author of more than 100 books and journals.

== Early life and education ==
Lee was born in 1937 as the fourth son of renowned I Ching scholar Lee Dal (이달; 李達; 1889 – 1958) in the Yonan Lee Clan. His birthplace was Bisan-dong, Daegu, North Gyeongsang province. Lee briefly spent his childhood in Wolseong-dong, Gyeongju until he moved to Iksan, North Jeolla Province with the rest of his family in 1942. In 1945, he entered Mount Daedun with his father to study Classical Chinese. Lee left his family in 1951 and first settled in an orphanage in Busan, where he was admitted into Hanyoung Middle School's provisional refugee school. He then ran away to an orphanage in Yeosu, ran away again, and finally settled in Gwangju, where he applied and was admitted into Gwangju High School with a forged middle school diploma. Lee graduated from Gwangju High School in 1958 and was admitted into Seorabeol University of Art's (Note: merged into Chungang University in 1972) Department of Creative Writing, where he studied with other writers including Cheon Seung-sae and Kim Joo-young. Lee was forced to drop out of university due to economic hardships. He spent the rest of his youth caring for his mother who was diagnosed with cancer, making a living as a vendor, private educator, waiter, and insurance salesman.

== Career ==
After finding an interest in history, Lee began his career as an autodidact historian in his mid-twenties. He studied Korean history mostly through books, making a living as a chestnut vendor. In 1967, Lee found a temporary job in the Donga Ilbo, where he translated old texts using his knowledge of Classical Chinese. He also wrote translated summaries of old texts in Seoul National University's Kyujanggak Archives. During his career as a translator, Lee wrote history-related articles for several magazines including Changjakkwa Bipyeong, Shindonga, Ppuri Gipeun Namu, Monthly Chosun, and Monthly Jungang. Lee recalled in an interview that his lack of a formal degree ironically benefitted him by allowing him to write more books for a broader audience instead of having to focus on academic papers. (Note: "아까 말한 대로 한국사 22권을 한길사에서 내려고 하는데, 이게 교수였으면 절대 못써요. 교수가 아니었기 때문에 쓴 거라고 생각합니다. 이게 거꾸로야. 오히려 정식 학위 받지 않고 교수 안 된 것이 나한테는 더 보람을 가져다 줄 수 있었다고 생각합니다. 내가 정식으로 학위를 받을 여건도 안됐지만 다 과감하게 노력으로만 해결한 거라고 할 수 있죠.") In 1974, he became a member of the Minjok Munhwa Ch'ujinhoe (민족문화추진회; lit. 'National Culture Promotion Association'). (Note: Re-established as the Institute for the Translation of Korean Classics in 2007) In 1980, Lee published his first book, The Thoughts of Heo Gyun (허균의 생각), in which he detailed novelist Heo Gyun's ideas as a philosopher. In 1981, he became a member of the Academy of Korean Studies and participated in the publication of the Encyclopedia of Korean Culture.

From 1986 to 1996, Lee participated as a member and later the head of The Institute for Korean Historical Studies and an editor for the institute's quarterly journal, Critical Review of History. From 1989 to 1994, he directed the Tonghak Nongmin Chŏnjaeng 100-chunyŏn Kinyŏm Saŏp Chʻujin Wiwŏnhoe (Committee for the Commemorative Project for the 100th Anniversary of the Donghak Peasant War).

Lee underwent surgery for stomach cancer in 2005. He died on March 18, 2020, around 7:00 AM in Seoul National University Hospital at the age of 82. (Note: 84 in Korean age)

== Works ==
- 허균의 생각 [The Thoughts of Heo Gyun] (1980)
- 이야기 인물한국사 [Peoples of Korean History Story] (1993)
- 조선후기의 정치사상과 사회변화[Political Ideologies and Social Changes of the Late Joseon Dynasty] (1994) ISBN 8935630446, 9788935630448
- 역사풍속기행 [History and Tradition Journals] (1999) ISBN 9788976962416, 8976962419
- 이이화의 동학농민혁명사 [Lee E-Hwa's History of the Donghak Peasant Revolution] (3 volumes, 2020) ISBN 9791190277525
