= Jo Yongho =

Korean novelist and journalist

Jo Yongho (Korean: 조용호, 1961 - ) is a Korean novelist and journalist. He has written several novels and short stories while also working as a reporter of a daily newspaper. His written works focus on travel and music, which is based on his experiences as a reporter.

== Life ==
He was born in 1961 in Jeongeup, North Jeolla Province (Jeollabuk-do). In college, he traveled around while singing folk songs, and after graduating, he participated in the Society of Research on Folk Songs as a singer for a little while. In 1986, he started his career as a reporter in the cultural department of daily newspaper, Segye Ilbo. Since 1993, he began to practice writing fictions, and debuted in 1998 by publishing a short story, "Benisro ganeun majimak yeolcha (베니스로 가는 마지막 열차 The Last Train to Venice)" in a literary magazine, Segyeui Munhak (세계의 문학 World's Literature). Ever since, he has continued to write fictions and essays while working as a reporter. He won the Muyeong Literary Award with a short story collection, Walili goyangi namu (왈릴리 고양이 나무 Walili Cat Tree) in 2006, and won the Tongyeong Literary Award – Kim Yongik Novel Literary Award with another short story collection, Tteodanine (떠다니네 Drifting) in 2014. He published a collection of interviews of writers, Yeogiga ggeutiramyeon (여기가 끝이라면 If Here is the End) in 2018, that had been published serially in a daily newspaper.

== Writings ==
Writings by journalist writers have common characteristics: a narrative focusing on the flow of major events, social consciousness, speedy and simple writing style. As opposed to these characteristics, Jo's novels consist of sensuous descriptions and beautifully elaborate sentences; use a motif based on love and travel; and reveal his global awareness that ;staying and wandering is the same after all.' His essays in the form of a traveler's journal also received favorable comments for their role as a guide to the writers and their works.

Novels

His only full-length novel, Gitayeo, nega malhaedao (기타여, 네가 말해다오 Guitar, Please Talk to Me) (2010) is the best work to show characteristics of Jo's writings that combine music and literature. It introduces traditional folk songs and protest songs that contain tragic history of Korea and Latin America. Particularly, this book has lyrics of various songs such as "Guitarra, dimelo tu (Guitar, Please Talk to Me)" by Atahualpa Yupanqui who played a pivotal role for Nueva canción.

The novel is developed with two paths crossing: one based on a memo written by the narrator's friend, Yeonu, who disappeared, and the other based on the narrator and Seungmi who use the memo to find him. Yeonu is a singer and a member of the folk song band from college and he disappears leaving a memo behind to the narrator. The narrator goes to Chile with Seungmi who is also a member of the band and Yeonu's wife to find any trace of Yeonu relying on the memo. Over the course of the novel, Yeonu's fateful yet tragic love with a mysterious woman, Seonhwa, is gradually revealed. Along with the flashbacks and the moves of the characters, the historical background of the Minjung song movement in 1980 and Nueva cancion in Latin America is presented. In particular, it describes in lively detail performances of university folk song bands in the 1980s followed by protests, conflicts between arts and protest movements, and concerns about popularization and modernization of Korean traditional music.

Essays

His first book is not a novel but a collection of essays, titled, Norae, sarange bbajin geudaeege (노래, 사랑에 빠진 그대에게 Song, To You Falling in Love) (1998). To him, essays are as important as novels. Especially, his travel essays are distinguished with descriptions and structure that usher readers into the literary world based on his in-depth understanding of literature.

Kisneun kis hansumeun hansum (키스는 키스, 한숨은 한숨 Kiss is Kiss; Sigh is Sigh) (2003) is a travel essay that introduces Latin American and African literary sites that are not familiar to Korean readers. He collected resources himself by traveling to eight sites across five Latin American countries and ten sites across three African countries from 2001 to 2002. He tried to understand literature based on the historical and cultural background of the region and this book introduces several writers and writings that are not known to Korean readers.

Kkotege gireul mutta (꽃에게 길을 묻다 Asking Flowers for Directions) (2006) is a collection of photo essays. Using flowers as the theme, this collection consists of travel stories in pursuit of beautiful flowers, photos of flowers he took himself, and poems about the flowers.

== Works ==
1) Short Story Collections

《베니스로 가는 마지막 열차》, 문이당, 2001 / Benisro ganeun majimak yeolcha (The Last Train to Venice), Munidang, 2001.

《왈릴리 고양이나무》, 민음사, 2005 / Walili goyangi namu (Walili Cat Tree), Mineumsa, 2005.

《떠다니네》, 민음사, 2013 / Tteodanine (Drifting), Mineumsa, 2013.

2) Novels

《기타여, 네가 말해다오》, 문이당, 2010 / Gitayeo, nega malhaedao (Guitar, Please Talk to Me), Munidang, 2010.

3) Essay Collections

《노래, 사랑에 빠진 그대에게》, 이룸, 1998 / Norae, sarange bbajin geudaeege (Song, To You Falling in Love), irum, 1998.

《돈키호테를 위한 변명》, 문이당, 1994 / Donkihotereul wihan byeonmyeong (Excuse for Don Quixote), Munidang, 1994.

《키스는 키스 한숨은 한숨: 중남미 아프리카 문학기행》, 마음산책, 2003 / Kisneun kis hansumeun hansum (Kiss is Kiss; Sigh is Sigh), Maeumsanchaek, 2003.

《꽃에게 길을 묻다》, 생각의 나무, 2006. 북랩, 2015 / Kkotege gireul mutta (Asking Flowers for Directions), Saenggake namu, 2006. Boklap, 2015.

《시인에게 길을 묻다》, 섬앤섬, 2011 / Siinege gireul mutta (Asking a Poet for Directions), Seomaenseom, 2011.

4) Interviews

《여기가 끝이라면》, 작가, 2018 / Yeogiga ggeutiramyeon (If Here is the End), Jakka, 2018.

== Awards ==
2006, The 7th Muyeong Literary Award (Walili Cat Tree)

2014, Tongyeong Literary Award – Kim Yongik Novel Literary Award (Drifting)
