= List of most-viewed Instagram reels =

The list of the most-viewed reels on Instagram is ranked based on total view count.

As of November 20th, 2026, the top 20 most-viewed Instagram reels are as follows:

Rank	Creator / Campaign	Description	Views	Ref(s)
1	Deepika Padukone (Hilton – It Matters Where You Stay)	Promotional reel featuring Padukone as Hilton’s global ambassador	1.9 billion	
2	Hardik Pandya (BGMI – Take the Shot)	Gaming collaboration with Battlegrounds Mobile India	1.6 billion	
3	BGMI – Flex Your New Phone	Promotional reel for Battlegrounds Mobile India	1.4 billion	
4	Lionel Messi	Paid partnership with Mastercard	1.4 billion	
5	Canva India	Promotional reel showing off Canva's editing features	1.2 billion	
6	Virat Kohli	Paid collaboration with Oakley Meta	1.1 billion	
7	Lionel Messi	Paid partnership with ChatGPT	1.1 billion	
8	Netflix India	Promotional reel featuring Aditya Roy Kapoor and Shraddha Kapoor from film Ok Jaanu	1.1 billion	
9	Narendra Modi	Tour to Vantara	1 billion	
10	Deepika Padukone (Ranveer Singh & visitabudhabi – It Matters Where You Stay)	Promotional reel featuring Padukone and Ranveer Singh as visitabudhabi global ambassador	1 billion	
11	lotos_moyhizmati	Corrupted car maintenance video	1 billion	
12	Lionel Messi	Paid partnership with Mastercard	1 billion	
13	Anthony Butenyi	Corrupted trombone practice video (View count is frozen at 936 million)	936 million	
14	Netflix India	Promotional reel comparing Shah Rukh Khan in Om Shanti Om with Kim Seon-ho from When Life Gives You Tangerines doing Kim Seon-ho Smile Challenge	903 million	
15	Canva India	GenZ GF vs Millennial BF	887 million	
16	J.Mossis	Tie a tie tutorial	870 million	
17	Ed Sheeran	Promotional reel for "Symmetry" featuring Karan Aujla	777 million	
18	Martin Garrix and Lauv	Behind the scenes of the "MAD" music video	632 million	
19	Muhammed Riswan – Has anyone seen the ball?	Freestyle football clip filmed near a waterfall	626 million	
20	Cristiano Ronaldo	International Retirement Announcement	619 million	

== See also ==
- List of most-followed Instagram accounts
- List of most-liked Instagram posts
