= Gwangju Cinema =

Historic movie theater in South Korea

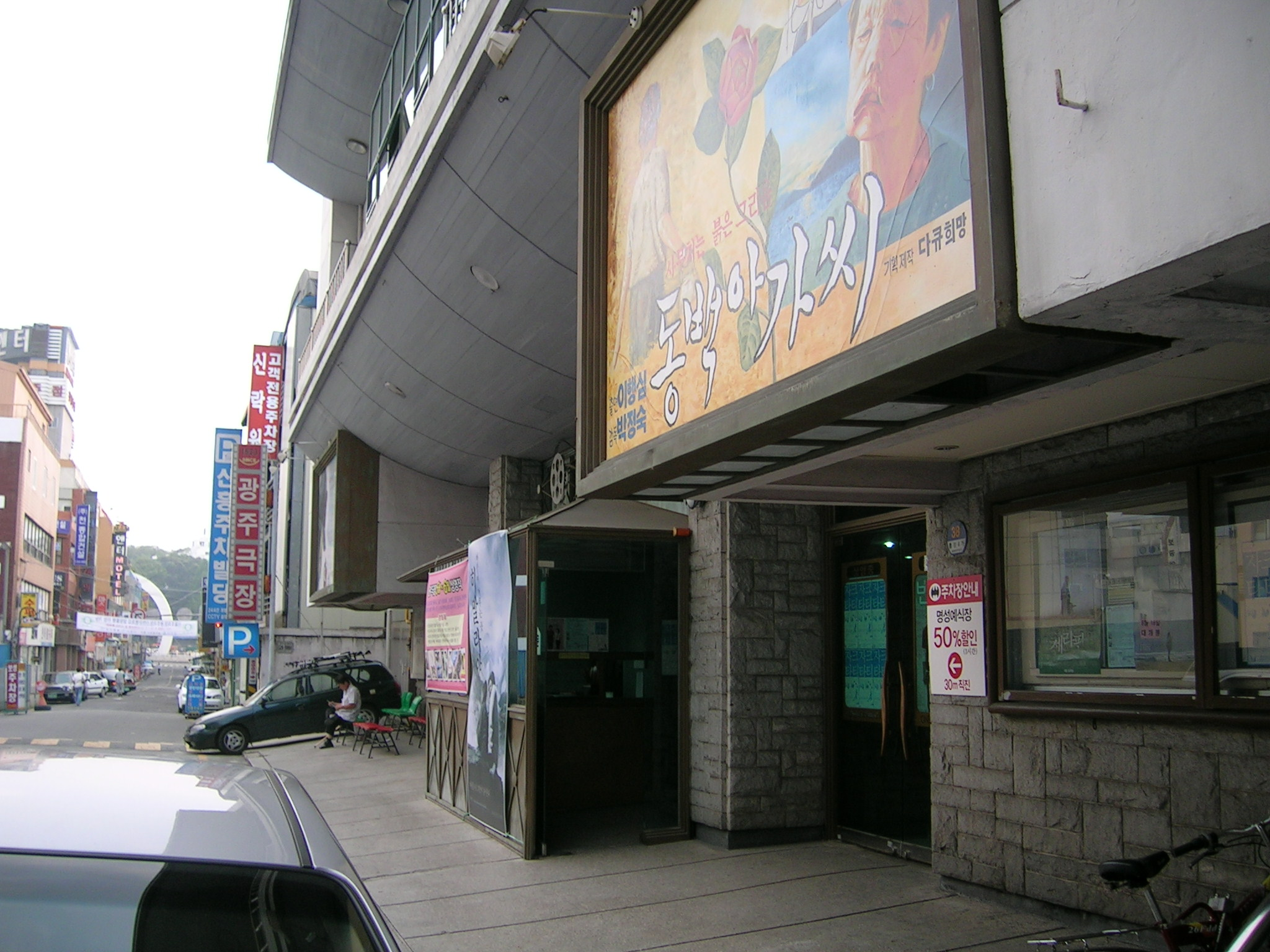
- Interactive map of Gwangju Cinema
- Address: 10 Chungjang-ro 46beon-gil, Dong-gu, Gwangju, South Korea
- Coordinates: 35.14985°N 126.91242°E

Construction
- Opened: October 1, 1935

Website
- m.cafe.naver.com/ca-fe/cinemagwangju (in Korean)

Gwangju Cinema (Korean: 광주극장; Hanja: 光州劇場; also Gwangju Theater) is a historic theater in Dong District, Gwangju, South Korea. The theater first opened on October 1, 1935, and screened its first film on October 10. At the time of its opening, it was the theater with the largest seating capacity in Korea. It has been described as the only single-screen theater left in the country, as multiplex theaters have become the norm. It now specializes in art films.

The theater has also historically hosted other types of productions, including concerts, pansori productions, and stage plays.

== History ==
After the Japanese-owned movie theater Gwangjujwa burned down, the only other theater left in the city was the Imperial Theater (제국관; 帝國館), which was also owned by a Japanese person. In order to meet the need for not only a new movie theater, but also one owned by Koreans, a corporation for Gwangju Theater was established in 1933.

Construction on the theater began in 1934, and it finished on October 1, 1935. It opened as a two-story reinforced concrete building with a floor space of 400 pyeong (1,300 m^{2}). It was able to accommodate 1,200 people, twice as many as the other theater in the city at the time. The first screening was held on October 10. As the office of the Japanese Governor-General mandated that all theaters must show Japanese-language films, the first screening was of a Japanese film (日像月像; 1935). An interpreter described the events of the film for Koreans during its screening. The first Korean film shown was the 1935 Chunhyang jeon. This film was also the first Korean talkie.

Like other movie theaters in Korea, during the colonial period, Gwangju Cinema also served as a public forum for discussing politics. It held this role even after the 1945 liberation of Korea. For example, on October 21, 1948, shortly after the controversial establishment of the First Republic of Korea, protest films were shown that condemned both the South Korean and American governments. By December of that year, the theater was used to host cultural events sponsored by the United States, which led to it becoming a conduit for the spread of American culture in Korea. The theater continued operating even during the Korean War, when it was used to show newsreels to the public. It continued to be a place of significant societal importance until the mid-1960s.

It was destroyed by a fire on January 18, 1968, around 4 a.m. According to one contemporary news article, it was caused by someone stealing a motor, which caused an electrical fire in the basement that ignited fireworks used for special effects. By then, the business was owned by the second generation of its original founding family. Despite advice to the contrary, the owner decided to reconstruct the theater. By October 4, the building was restored and renovated, with four floors above ground in the same architectural style as the original. A dressing room and waiting room for actors was installed behind the screen on the first floor.

The rise of multiplex theaters in South Korea during the 1990s significantly impacted single-screen theaters in the country. The theater survived in its single-screen form due to subsidies from the Korean Film Council. By contrast, other historic theaters, like the first movie theater in Korea Ae Kwan Theater, remodelled into multiplexes.

As of 2021, the theater fills the niche of an art film theater, that focuses on local artists and international films. It has hosted a number of film festivals, including some that it has operated. It currently has a membership program that helps fund its continued operation. In December 2020, the Dong District government created a "Movie Alley" next to the theater.

== See also ==
- Ae Kwan Theater – The first movie theater in Korea (1895)
- Dansungsa – A historically significant theater that screened the first Korean film, Righteous Revenge
- Korean News – A major newsreel by the South Korean government during the Korean War era
