= Gwangju High School =

School in Gwangju, South Korea

Coordinates: 35.15911°N 126.92200°E

- Dong-gu, Gwangju; South Korea

Information
- Established: September 1951
- Principal: Kim Jong-geun
- Faculty: 66
- Enrolment: 846
- Website: http://www.gwangju.hs.kr/

- Gwangju High School
- Hangul: 광주고등학교
- Hanja: 光州高等學校
- RR: Gwangju godeunghakgyo
- MR: Kwangju kodŭnghakkyo

Gwangju High School (Korean: 광주고등학교; Hanja: 光州高等學校) is a high school in Dong-gu district, Gwangju, South Korea. It was established in 1951.
