= Our Lady of Lourdes Cathedral, Daegu =

Our Lady of Lourdes Cathedral
- 계산동 성당
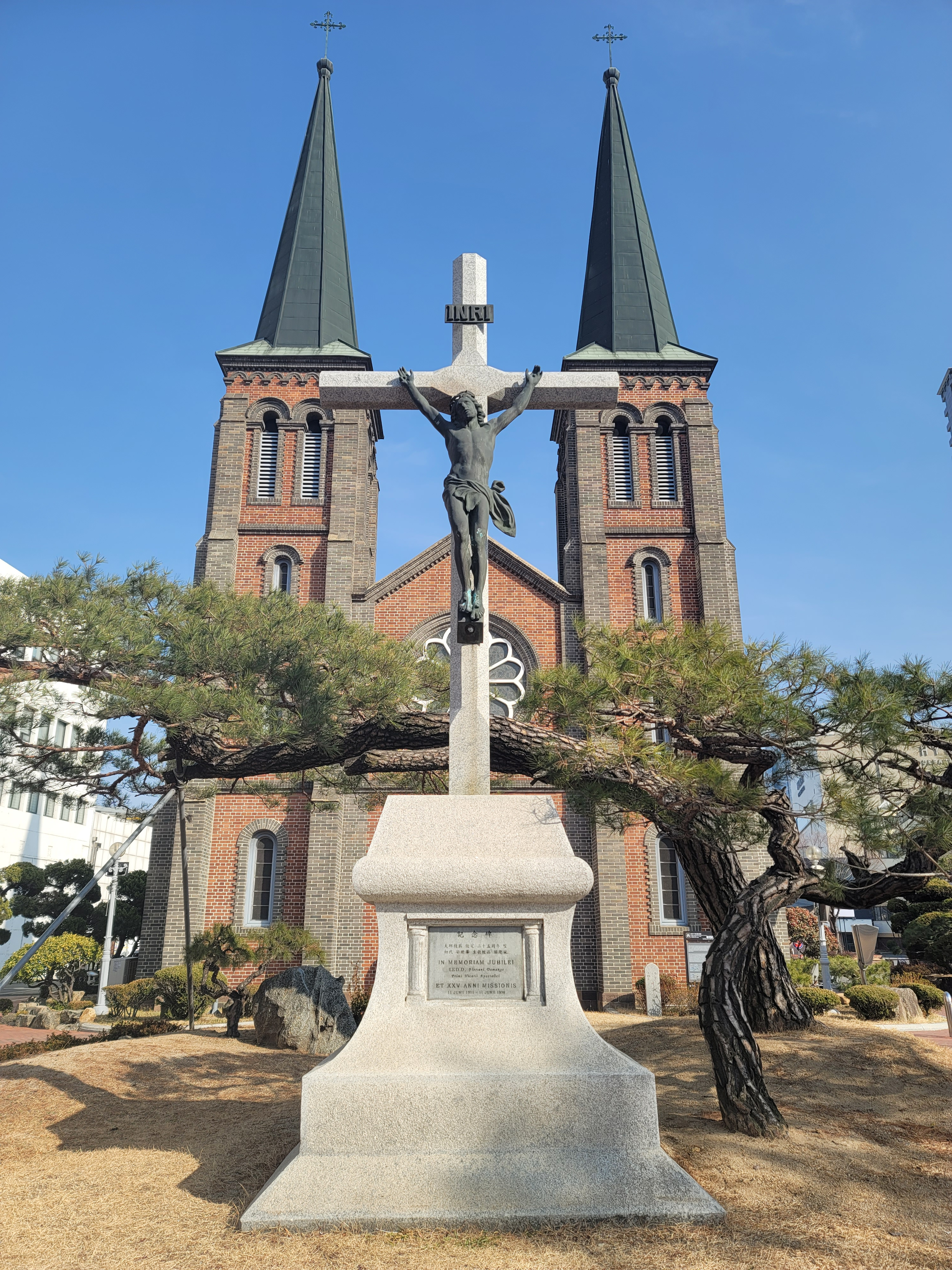
- Our Lady of Lourdes Cathedral
- 35°52′05″N 128°35′16″E
- Location: Daegu
- Country: South Korea
- Denomination: Roman Catholic Church

Architecture
- Heritage designation: Historic Sites of South Korea
- Designated: 1981-09-25

The Our Lady of Lourdes Cathedral (Korean: 계산동 성당) or simply Cathedral of Daegu, is a religious building belonging to the Catholic Church and is located in Daegu part of North Gyeongsang Province, South Korea.

It is a temple that follows the Roman or Latin rite and functions as the headquarters of the Metropolitan Archdiocese of Daegu (Archidioecesis Taeguensis or 천주교 대구대교구) which was created in 1962 by bull "Fertile Evangelii semen" by the Pope John XXIII.

The present building was built between 1902 and 1903 and remodeled when it was elevated to cathedral status in 1911. Pope John Paul II visited the temple in May 1984.

The original structure was made of wood but it burnt down in 1899.

== See also ==
- Roman Catholicism in South Korea
- Our Lady of Lourdes
