= Dong District, Jeonnam-Gwangju =

District of Jeonnam-Gwangju, South Korea

Coordinates: 35.15°N 126.92°E

Dong
- Autonomous District
- Flag

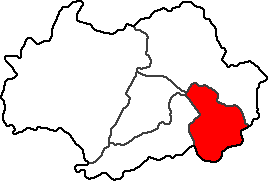
- Country: South Korea
- Region: Honam
- Provincial-level city: Jeonnam-Gwangju

Government
  - Mayor: Lim Taek (임택)

Population (July 2025)
  - Total: 104,942
  - Dialect: Jeolla
- Website: Dong District Office

Korean name
- Hangul: 동구
- Hanja: 東區
- RR: Dong-gu
- MR: Tong-gu

Dong District (Korean: 동구) is a district of Jeonnam-Gwangju, South Korea. It was once a part of the city of Gwangju, but on July 1, 2026, that city was merged into Jeonnam-Gwangju.

Mudeungsan is a famous landmark in the district. Modern art is displayed at the Street of Art, which was the first one of its kind in South Korea. It has Asian Cultural Center and Gwangju International Community Center.

== Education ==
- Gwangju High School
- Chosun University High School

== See also ==
- Hwanggeum-dong, Gwangju
