= Jeongeup =

City in North Jeolla, South Korea

- Municipal city
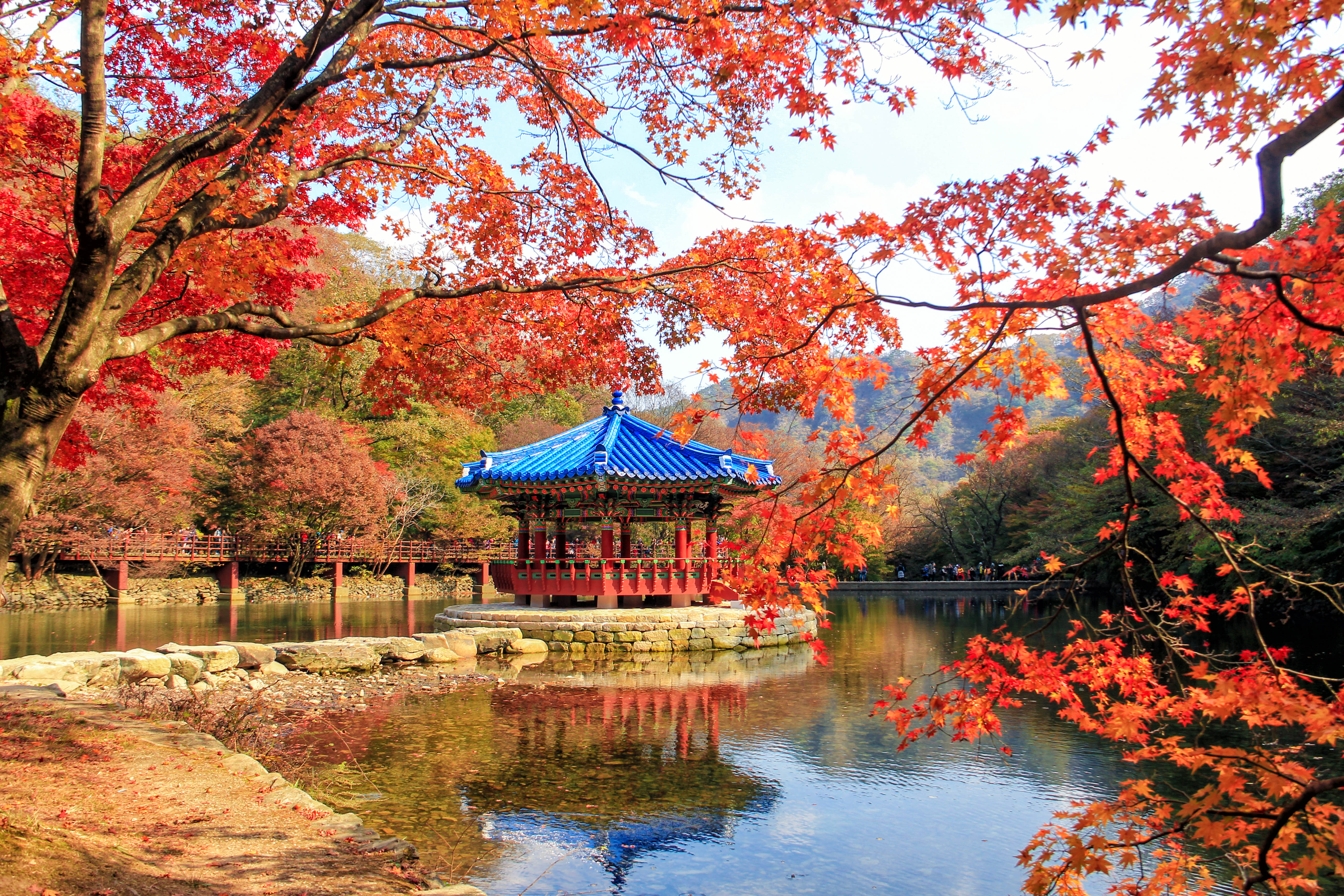
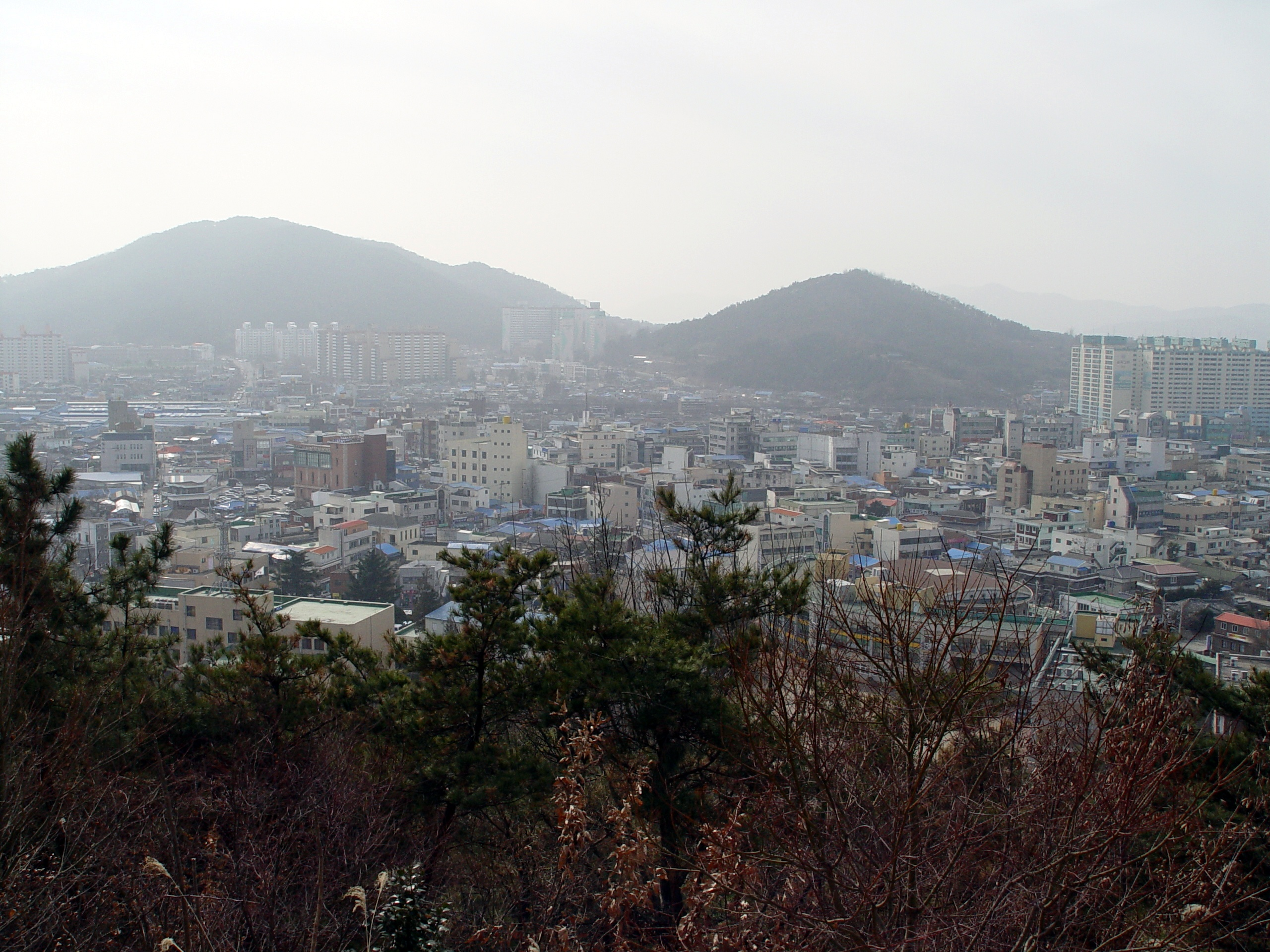
- From the top: Naejangsan, Jeongeup seen from Seonghwangsan

- Flag Emblem of Jeongeup

- Location in South Korea
- Coordinates: 35°34′N 126°51′E
- Country: South Korea
- State: Jeonbuk
- Administrative divisions: 1 eup, 14 myeon, 12 dong

Area
  - Total: 692.66 km^{2} (267.44 sq mi)

Population (March, 2022)
  - Total: 106,187
  - Density: 153/km^{2} (400/sq mi)
  - Dialect: Jeolla

Korean name
- Hangul: 정읍시
- Hanja: 井邑市
- RR: Jeongeup-si
- MR: Chŏngŭp-si

Jeongeup (Korean: 정읍; Korean pronunciation: [tɕʌŋ.ɯp̚]) is a city in North Jeolla Province, South Korea. The city limits include Naejang-san National Park, a popular destination particularly in autumn due to its foliage. Jeongeup is on the Honam Expressway and Honam Line, with the Seohaean Expressway also within easy reach, providing links to Seoul and Mokpo.

== Demographics ==
Jeongeup's population is in decline, with an average of 56 people moving to the city every day but 91 leaving, with the birth and death rates being equal. The divorce rate currently runs at 50%.

== Geography ==
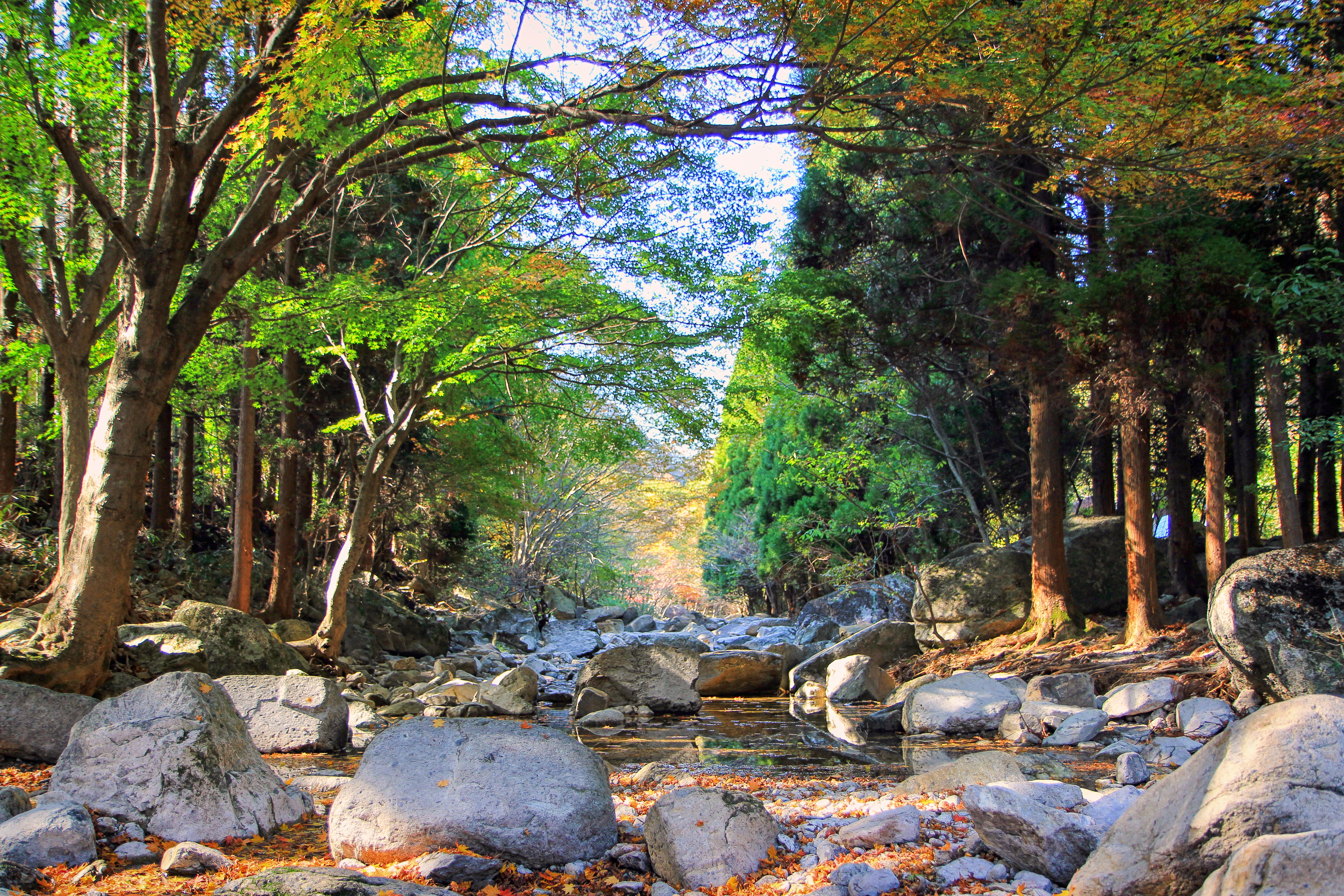
Namchang Valley, Naejangsan

The main hills in Jeongeup are Naejang-san National Park and Ibamsan, though there are also several smaller hills in the city. It is the east of the city which is more mountainous, the west being a plain around the Dongjin River. There are several streams in Jeongeup, most notably the Jeongeupcheon, a tributary of the Dongjin. This over went a makeover by the city council in December 2009.

== Attractions ==
Jeongeup, like many cities in Korea, had a hyanggyo, or Confucian school, where people were trained in Confucian ways. This building is a tourist attraction today, but is not open to the public.

Jeongeup is known for a traditional song from the Baekje Kingdom era, known as Jeongeup-ga. The song tells the tale of the lamenting heart of a woman waiting for her peddler husband's return.

Naejangsa Temple: first erected in 636, but most of its current buildings were built after the Japanese invasions of Korea in 1597 and the Korean War. On 31 October 2012, the temple was destroyed in a fire that broke out.

== Festivals ==
A maple festival around Naejang-san is held annually. The maple leaves here are widely regarded as some of the most beautiful in the country. The festival was abolished in 2002 but was revived in 2007. This festival includes several events regarding the chrysanthemum love.

Additionally, a century ago, Jeongeup was the site of a revolution by the religious movement of Cheondoism. Many peasants joined the movement to fight against invading Japanese troops. For this, Jeongeup holds an annual ceremony to commemorate the event.

== Notable people ==
- Jo Yongho, author
- Seung Hwan Oh, professional baseball player, Olympic gold medalist
- Song Dae-kwan, singer
- Yu Sung-yup, politician

== Twin towns – sister cities ==
Jeongeup is twinned with:

- Jongno District, Seoul
- Sacheon, South Gyeongsang Province
- Sokcho, Gangwon
- Suseong District, Daegu
- Xuzhou, Jiangsu, China
- Narita, Chiba, Japan

== Climate ==
Jeongeup has a cooler version of a humid subtropical climate (Köppen climate classification Cfa).

Climate data for Jeongeup (1991–2020 normals, extremes 1970–present)
Month	Jan	Feb	Mar	Apr	May	Jun	Jul	Aug	Sep	Oct	Nov	Dec	Year
Record high °C (°F)	18.5 (65.3)	21.7 (71.1)	28.4 (83.1)	31.0 (87.8)	34.1 (93.4)	34.2 (93.6)	37.3 (99.1)	38.4 (101.1)	37.3 (99.1)	31.1 (88.0)	27.6 (81.7)	19.6 (67.3)	38.4 (101.1)
Mean daily maximum °C (°F)	4.5 (40.1)	7.1 (44.8)	12.7 (54.9)	19.3 (66.7)	24.5 (76.1)	27.9 (82.2)	30.3 (86.5)	31.1 (88.0)	26.9 (80.4)	21.3 (70.3)	14.2 (57.6)	6.9 (44.4)	18.9 (66.0)
Daily mean °C (°F)	−0.2 (31.6)	1.7 (35.1)	6.4 (43.5)	12.4 (54.3)	18.0 (64.4)	22.2 (72.0)	25.7 (78.3)	26.1 (79.0)	21.4 (70.5)	15.1 (59.2)	8.6 (47.5)	2.1 (35.8)	13.3 (55.9)
Mean daily minimum °C (°F)	−4.4 (24.1)	−2.9 (26.8)	1.0 (33.8)	6.4 (43.5)	12.2 (54.0)	17.5 (63.5)	22.2 (72.0)	22.3 (72.1)	16.9 (62.4)	9.8 (49.6)	3.7 (38.7)	−2.2 (28.0)	8.5 (47.3)
Record low °C (°F)	−19.8 (−3.6)	−20.0 (−4.0)	−10.9 (12.4)	−4.2 (24.4)	2.4 (36.3)	8.5 (47.3)	13.1 (55.6)	11.6 (52.9)	5.6 (42.1)	−1.5 (29.3)	−10.4 (13.3)	−15.2 (4.6)	−20.0 (−4.0)
Average precipitation mm (inches)	36.5 (1.44)	39.0 (1.54)	56.0 (2.20)	82.5 (3.25)	87.2 (3.43)	136.1 (5.36)	284.0 (11.18)	298.1 (11.74)	148.5 (5.85)	61.0 (2.40)	55.6 (2.19)	45.3 (1.78)	1,329.8 (52.35)
Average precipitation days (≥ 0.1 mm)	9.9	7.6	8.6	8.3	8.8	9.5	14.3	14.4	9.1	6.6	8.5	10.9	116.5
Average snowy days	9.4	6.0	2.5	0.1	0.0	0.0	0.0	0.0	0.0	0.0	2.2	7.1	27.4
Average relative humidity (%)	73.2	67.9	64.2	61.5	63.8	70.9	77.1	76.6	75.0	71.7	71.5	73.1	70.5
Mean monthly sunshine hours	138.2	159.0	197.0	215.3	227.3	176.1	152.9	168.9	179.9	190.6	151.4	131.4	2,088
Percentage possible sunshine	47.8	52.4	52.8	57.4	54.2	44.4	39.4	46.8	51.3	58.9	50.8	46.5	50.1
Source: Korea Meteorological Administration (snow and percent sunshine 1981–2010)

== Gallery ==
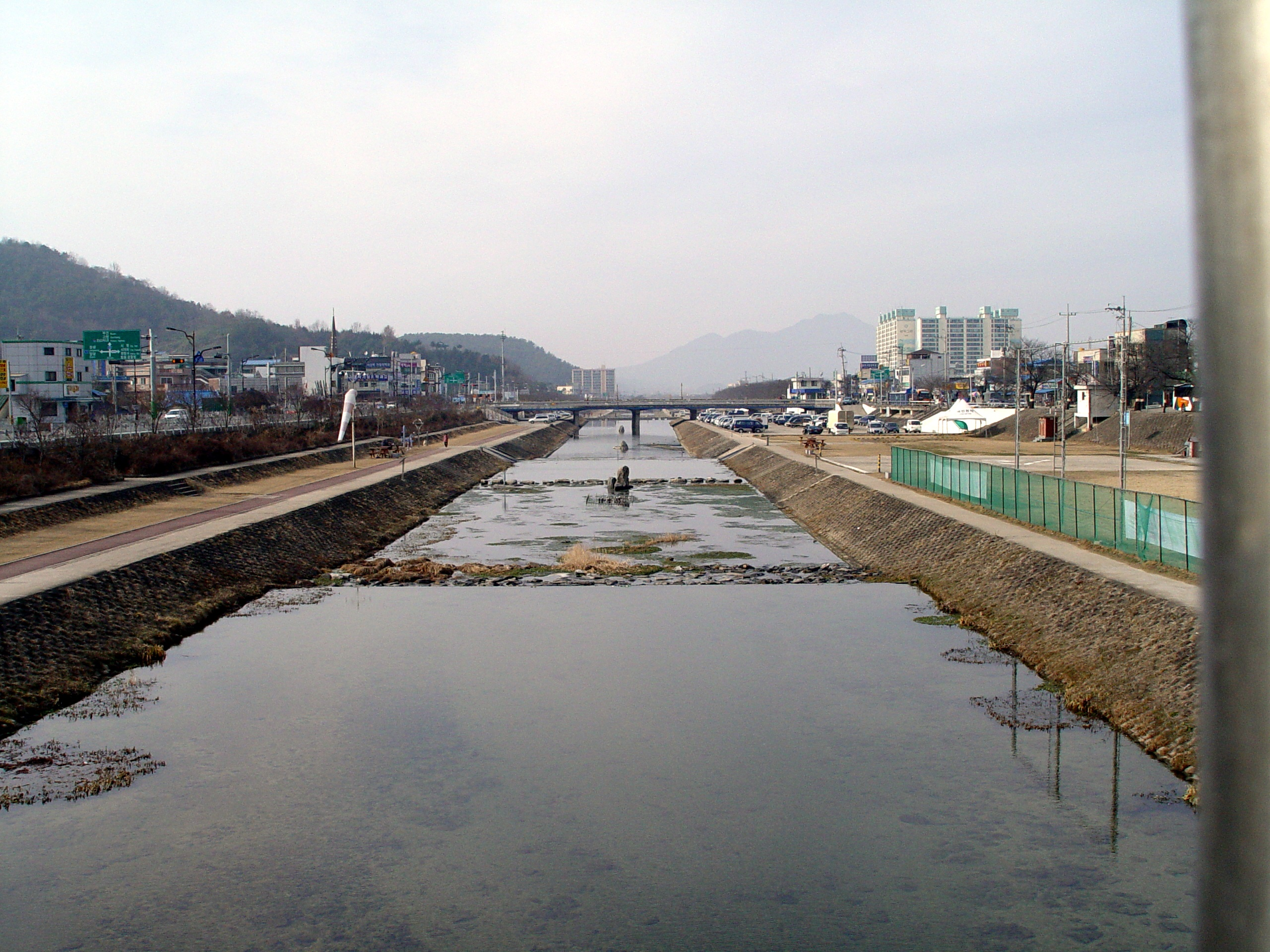
Looking downstream along the Jeongeupcheon from Chosangyo

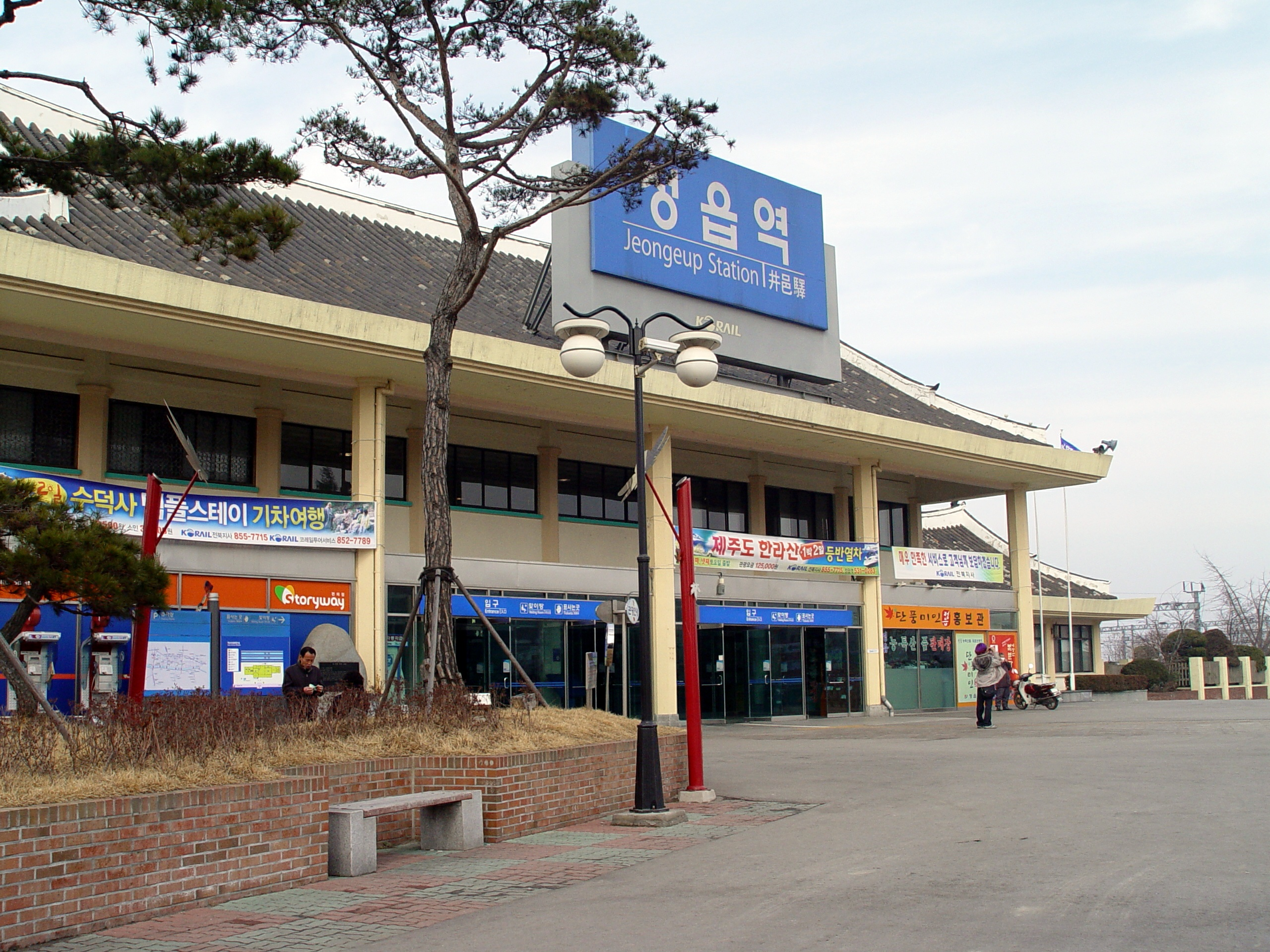
Jeongeup Station

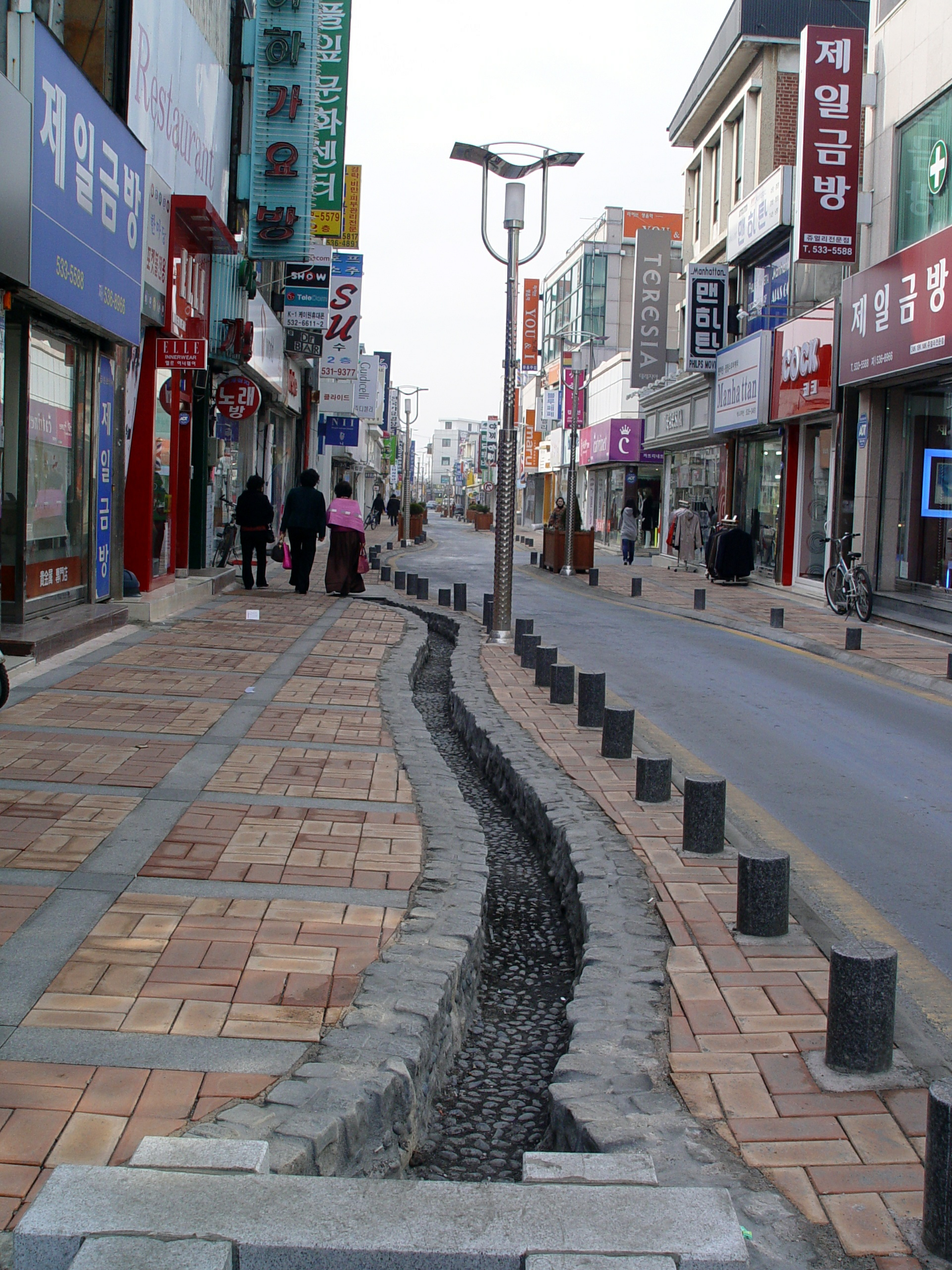
Street in central Jeongeup

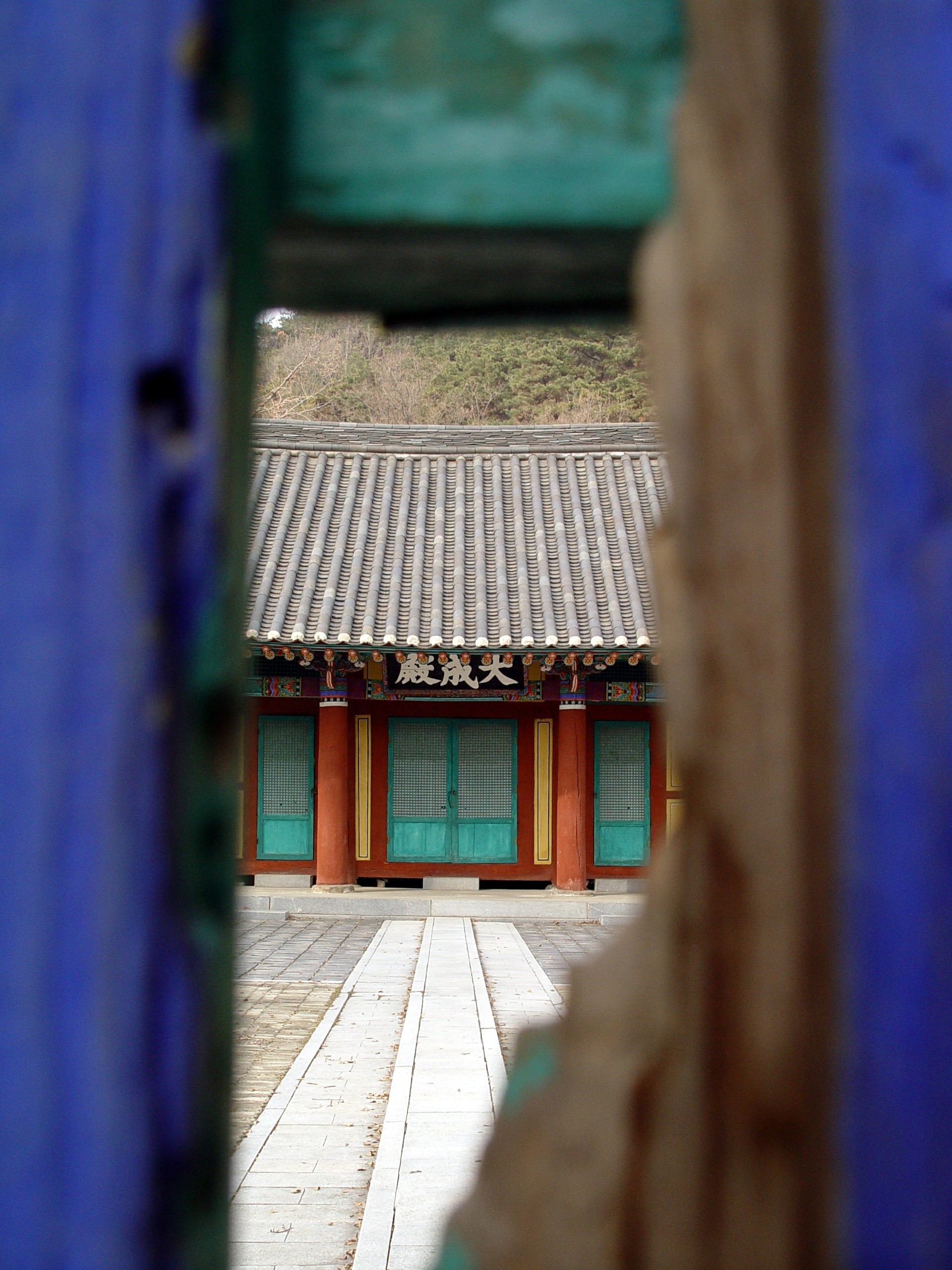
Hyanggyo

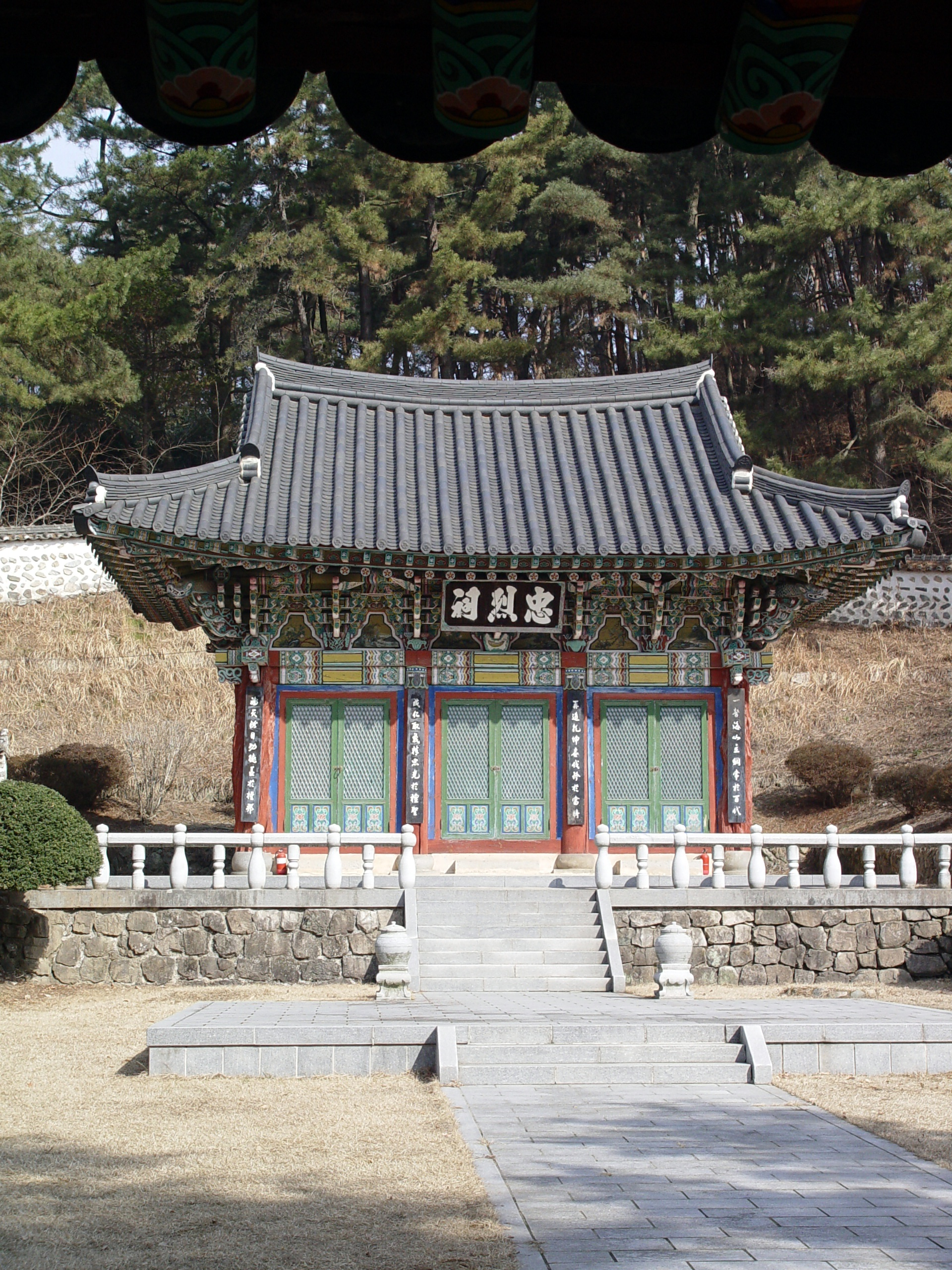
Chungryeolsa

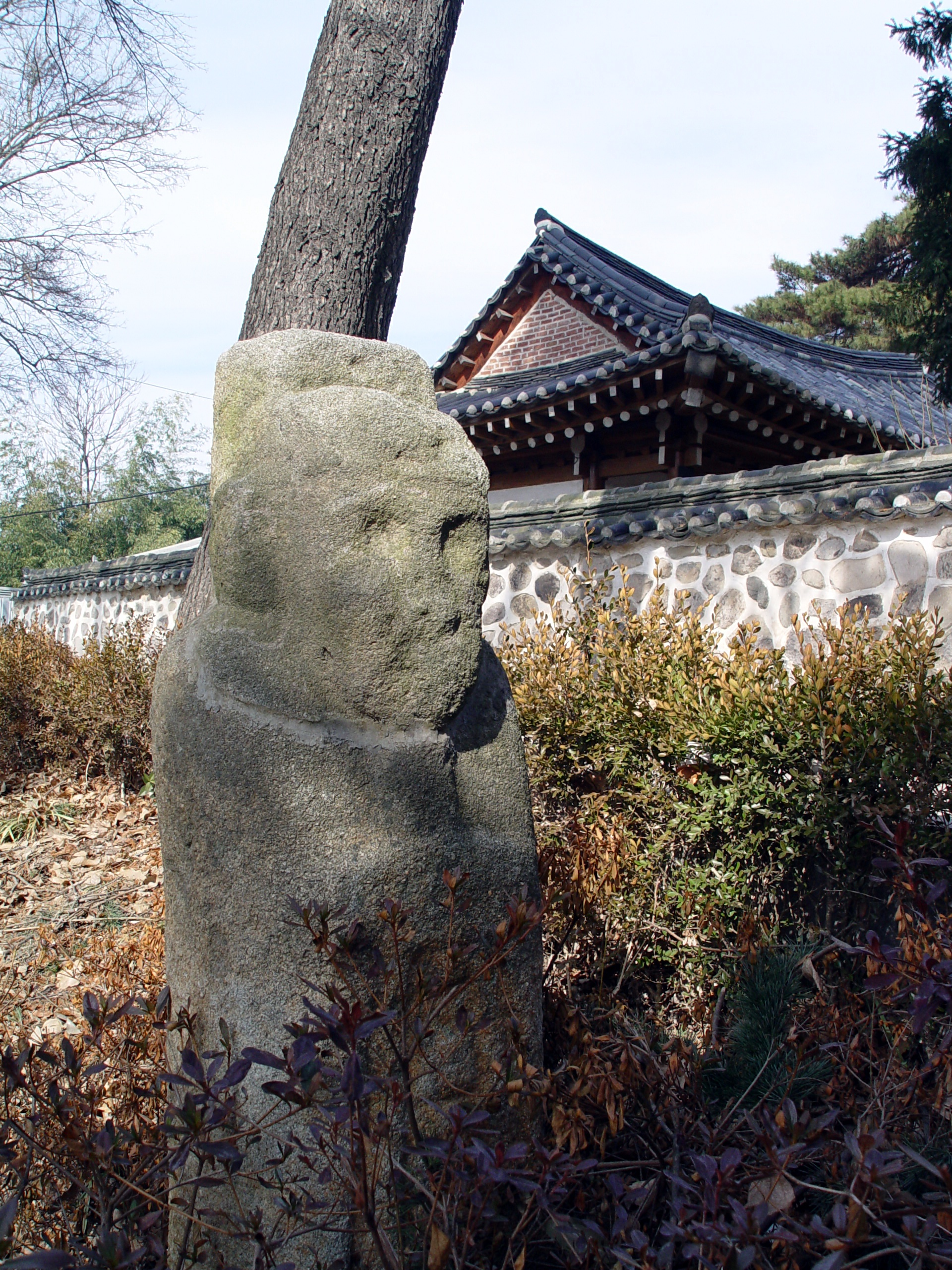
Statue guarding Chungryeolsa

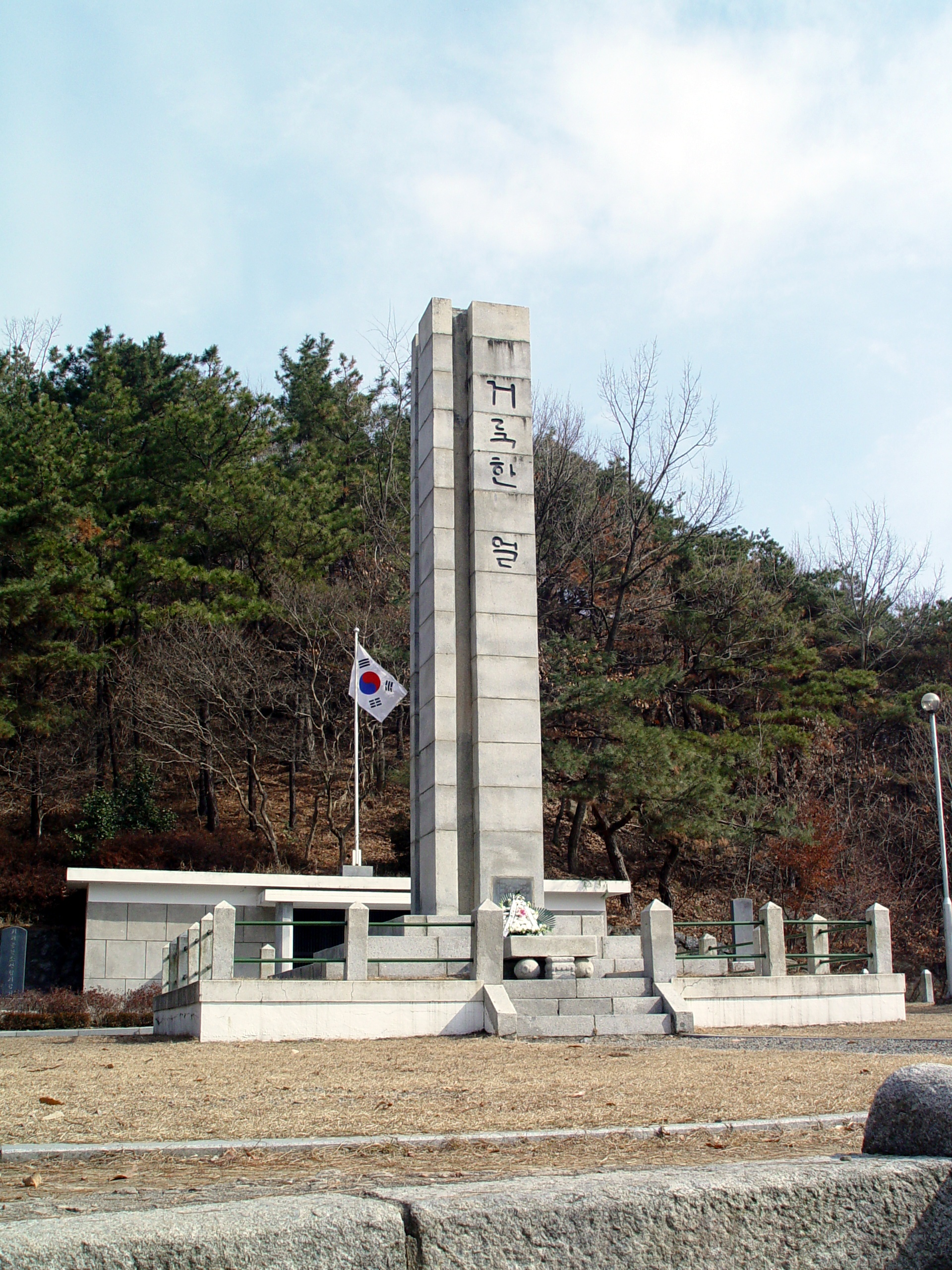
Memorial to those who fell defending South Korea

== See also ==
- Naejang-san
- List of cities in South Korea
