= List of accolades received by Burning =

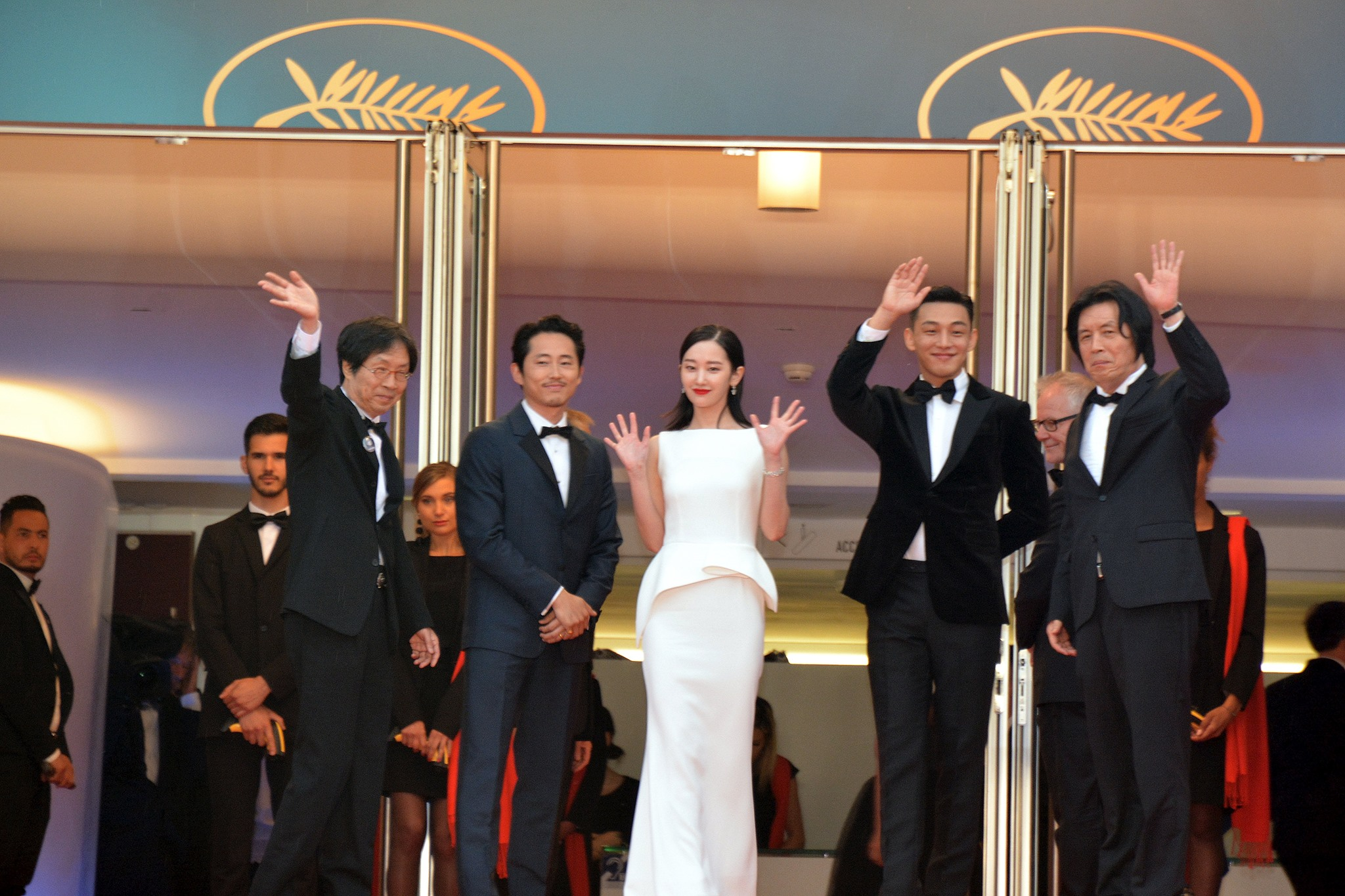
- Lee Joon-dong, Steven Yeun, Jeon Jong-seo, Yoo Ah-in, Lee Chang-dong at Cannes 2018.
Accolades
Award	Wins	Nominations
Cannes Film Festival	2	3
International Cinephile Society Cannes Awards	1	1
Munich International Film festival	0	1
World Cinema Amsterdam	0	1
ShinFilm Art Film Festival	1	1
Film by the Sea International Film Festival	0	2
Miskolc International Film Festival	0	1
International Adana Film Festival	1	1
Haifa International Film Festival	0	1
Manaki Brothers Film Festival	1	1
Buil Film Awards	2	8
Sitges Film Festival	0	1
Pingyao International Film Festival	1	1
Adelaide Film Festival	0	1
Grand Bell Awards	1	8
The Seoul Awards	0	3
Korean Association of Film Critics Awards	3	3
Tour du Cinéma Français	1	1
Oslo Film from the South Festival	1	2
Key West Film Festival	1	1
Stockholm Film Festival	0	1
Blue Dragon Film Awards	0	4
National Board of Review	1	1
Asia Pacific Screen Awards	1	3
Washington D.C. Area Film Critics Association	0	1
Cahiers du cinéma	1	1
Busan Film Critics Awards	1	1
Los Angeles Online Film Critics Society Awards	0	1
Chicago Film Critics Association	0	2
Toronto Film Critics Association	4	4
British Film Institute	1	1
Los Angeles Film Critics Association	3	3
San Francisco Film Critics Circle	0	1
New Mexico Film Critics	4	4
London Film Week	3	3
Director's Cut Awards	1	3
Phoenix Critics Circle	0	1
Utah Film Critics Association	1	1
Boston Society of Film Critics	1	1
Seattle Film Critics Society	0	2
Dallas–Fort Worth Film Critics Association	1	1
Vancouver Film Critics Circle	0	2
North Texas Film Critics Association	1	1
IndieWire Critics Poll	5	5
Cine 21 Awards	3	3
Florida Film Critics Circle	1	2
Greater Western New York Film Critics Association	2	5
North Carolina Film Critics Association	0	1
Online Film Critics Society	0	2
Houston Film Critics Society	0	1
Columbus Film Critics Association	1	2
National Society of Film Critics	4	4
Austin Film Critics Association	1	3
Dorian Awards	0	1
Club Média Ciné	1	1
Alliance of Women Film Journalists	0	1
Georgia Film Critics Association	0	1
Denver Film Critics Society	0	1
Hawaii Film Critics Society	0	1
Palm Springs International Film Festival	0	2
Critics' Choice Movie Awards	0	1
Latino Entertainment Journalists Association	0	1
KOFRA Film Awards	1	1
American Film Awards	1	3
Santa Barbara International Film Festival	1	1
Belgian Film Press Union	1	1
Chicago Independent Film Critics Circle	0	1
Online Film & Television Association	0	1
Robert Awards	0	1
International Cinephile Society	5	9
Prix des auditeurs du Masque et la Plume	1	1
Independent Spirit Awards	0	1
International Online Cinema Awards	3	6
Gold Derby Awards	0	1
Bodil Awards	0	1
Miami International Film Festival	1	2
Asian Film Awards	2	9
Chlotrudis Awards	0	3
Florence Korea Film Fest	2	2
MOOOV Film Festival	1	1
Baeksang Arts Awards	1	6
IndieLisboa	0	1
Golden Trailer Awards	0	2
Chunsa Film Art Awards	1	5
Saturn Award	1	3
CineLibri	1	1
Prêmio Guarani	0	1
Australian Film Critics Association	0	1
Mainichi Film Awards	0	1
Kinema Junpo Awards	1	1
Turkish Film Critics Association	1	1

Totals (Note: Certain award groups do not simply award one winner. They acknowledge several different recipients, have runners-up, and have third place. Since this is a specific recognition and is different from losing an award, runner-up mentions are considered wins in this award tally. For simplification and to avoid errors, each award in this list has been presumed to have had a prior nomination.)
- Wins: 83
- Nominations: 191

Burning is a 2018 South Korean mystery drama film directed by Lee Chang-dong. The film stars Yoo Ah-in, Steven Yeun, and Jeon Jong-seo. The film is based on one of Haruki Murakami's seventeen short stories in The Elephant Vanishes, "Barn Burning". It was selected to compete for the Palme d'Or at the 2018 Cannes Film Festival and won the FIPRESCI Prize. It became the highest-rated film in the history of Screen International’s Cannes jury grid. It was also selected as the South Korean entry for the Best Foreign Language Film at the 91st Academy Awards and became the first Korean film to make it to the final nine-film shortlist.

The first film directed by Lee Chang-dong in eight years, Burning was among the lineup in competition entries announced for the 2018 Cannes Film Festival. Lee's 2007 film Secret Sunshine and 2010 film Poetry both premiered as in competition entries at the Cannes Film Festival.

The film was sold to more than 100 countries and territories at the Marché du Film in Cannes Film Festival. This include Hong Kong, China, Taiwan, Singapore, the United Kingdom, Japan, Australia, New Zealand, Spain, Greece, Poland and Turkey.

In South Korea, Burning premiered in theaters on May 17, 2018.

== Accolades ==
Award	Date of ceremony	Category	Recipient(s) and nominee(s)	Result	Ref(s)
Adelaide Film Festival	20 October 2018	International Best Feature	Burning	Nominated	
Alliance of Women Film Journalists	10 January 2019	Best Non-English Language Film	Burning	Nominated	
American Film Awards	15 February 2019	Best Dramatic Film	Burning	Won	
American Film Awards	15 February 2019	Best Asian Film	Burning	Nominated	
American Film Awards	15 February 2019	Best Director	Lee Chang-dong	Nominated	
Asia Pacific Screen Awards	29 November 2018	Burning	Best Feature Film	Nominated	
Asia Pacific Screen Awards	29 November 2018	Burning	Jury Grand Prize	Won	
Asia Pacific Screen Awards	29 November 2018	Best Screenplay	Oh Jung-mi, Lee Chang-dong	Nominated	
Asian Film Awards	17 March 2019	Best Film	Burning	Nominated	
Asian Film Awards	17 March 2019	Best Director	Lee Chang-dong	Won	
Asian Film Awards	17 March 2019	Best Actor	Yoo Ah-in	Nominated	
Asian Film Awards	17 March 2019	Best Newcomer	Jeon Jong-seo	Nominated	
Asian Film Awards	17 March 2019	Best Screenplay	Oh Jung-mi, Lee Chang-dong	Nominated	
Asian Film Awards	17 March 2019	Best Cinematography	Hong Kyung-pyo	Nominated	
Asian Film Awards	17 March 2019	Best Sound	Lee Seung-chul	Nominated	
Asian Film Awards	17 March 2019	Best Production Design	Shin Jeom-hee	Nominated	
Asian Film Awards	17 March 2019	Lifetime Achievement Award	Lee Chang-dong	Recipient	
Austin Film Critics Association	7 January 2019	Best Supporting Actor	Steven Yeun	Nominated	
Austin Film Critics Association	7 January 2019	Best Cinematography	Hong Kyung-pyo	Nominated	
Austin Film Critics Association	7 January 2019	Best Foreign Language Film	Burning	Won	
Australian Film Critics Association	7 February 2020	Best Film (Foreign Language)	Burning	Nominated	
Baeksang Arts Awards	1 May 2019	Best Film	Burning	Nominated	
Baeksang Arts Awards	1 May 2019	Best Director	Lee Chang-dong	Nominated	
Baeksang Arts Awards	1 May 2019	Best Actor	Yoo Ah-in	Nominated	
Baeksang Arts Awards	1 May 2019	Best Supporting Actor	Steven Yeun	Nominated	
Baeksang Arts Awards	1 May 2019	Best New Actress	Jeon Jong-seo	Nominated	
Baeksang Arts Awards	1 May 2019	Technical Award	Hong Kyung-pyo	Won	
Belgian Film Press Union	1 February 2019	Grand Prix of 2018	Burning	Won	
Blue Dragon Film Awards	23 November 2018	Best Actor	Yoo Ah-in	Nominated	
Blue Dragon Film Awards	23 November 2018	Best Supporting Actor	Steven Yeun	Nominated	
Blue Dragon Film Awards	23 November 2018	Best New Actress	Jeon Jong-seo	Nominated	
Blue Dragon Film Awards	23 November 2018	Best Music	Mowg	Nominated	
Bodil Awards	2 March 2019	Best Non-English Language Film	Burning	Nominated	
Boston Society of Film Critics	16 December 2018	Best Supporting Actor	Steven Yeun	Runner-up	
British Film Institute	11 December 2018	Sight & Sound's Best Films of 2018	Burning	3rd place	
Buil Film Awards	5 October 2018	Best Film	Burning	Nominated	
Buil Film Awards	5 October 2018	Best Director	Lee Chang-dong	Won	
Buil Film Awards	5 October 2018	Best Actor	Yoo Ah-in	Nominated	
Buil Film Awards	5 October 2018	Best Supporting Actor	Steven Yeun	Nominated	
Buil Film Awards	5 October 2018	Best New Actress	Jeon Jong-seo	Nominated	
Buil Film Awards	5 October 2018	Best Screenplay	Oh Jung-mi, Lee Chang-dong	Nominated	
Buil Film Awards	5 October 2018	Best Cinematography	Hong Kyung-pyo	Nominated	
Buil Film Awards	5 October 2018	Best Music	Mowg	Won	
Busan Film Critics Awards	7 December 2018	Technical Award	Hong Kyung-pyo	Won	
Cahiers du cinéma	3 December 2018	Top 10 Films	Burning	4th place	
Cannes Film Festival	19 May 2018	Palme d'Or	Lee Chang-dong	Nominated	
Cannes Film Festival	19 May 2018	FIPRESCI Prize	Lee Chang-dong	Won	
Cannes Film Festival	19 May 2018	Vulcan Award	Shin Jeom-hee	Won	
Chicago Film Critics Association	8 December 2018	Best Supporting Actor	Steven Yeun	Nominated	
Chicago Film Critics Association	8 December 2018	Best Foreign Language Film	Burning	Nominated	
Chicago Independent Film Critics Circle	2 February 2019	Best Foreign Film	Burning	Nominated	
Chlotrudis Awards	17 March 2019	Best Movie	Burning	Nominated	
Chlotrudis Awards	17 March 2019	Best Supporting Actor	Steven Yeun	Nominated	
Chlotrudis Awards	17 March 2019	Best Supporting Actress	Jeon Jong-seo	Nominated	
Chunsa Film Art Awards	18 July 2019	Best Director	Lee Chang-dong	Nominated	
Chunsa Film Art Awards	18 July 2019	Best Actor	Yoo Ah-in	Nominated	
Chunsa Film Art Awards	18 July 2019	Best Supporting Actor	Steven Yeun	Won	
Chunsa Film Art Awards	18 July 2019	Best New Actress	Jeon Jong-seo	Nominated	
Chunsa Film Art Awards	18 July 2019	Technical Award	Hong Kyung-pyo	Nominated	
Cine 21 Awards	19 December 2018	Best Film	Burning	Won	
Cine 21 Awards	19 December 2018	Best Director	Lee Chang-dong	Won	
Cine 21 Awards	19 December 2018	Best Cinematography	Hong Kyung-pyo	Won	
CineLibri International Book&Movie Festival	16 October 2019	Best Literary Adaptation Award	Burning	Won	
Club Média Ciné	8 January 2019	Best Foreign Language Film	Burning	Won	
Columbus Film Critics Association	3 January 2019	Best Adapted Screenplay	Oh Jung-mi, Lee Chang-dong	Runner-up	
Columbus Film Critics Association	3 January 2019	Best Foreign Language Film	Burning	Runner-up	
Critics' Choice Movie Awards	13 January 2019	Best Foreign Language Film	Burning	Nominated	
Dallas–Fort Worth Film Critics Association	17 December 2018	Best Foreign Language Film	Burning	4th place	
Denver Film Critics Society	14 January 2019	Best Foreign Language Film	Burning	Nominated	
Director's Cut Awards	14 December 2018	Best Director	Lee Chang-dong	Nominated	
Director's Cut Awards	14 December 2018	Best Screenplay	Oh Jung-mi, Lee Chang-dong	Nominated	
Director's Cut Awards	14 December 2018	Special Mention Award	Burning	Won	
Film by the Sea International Film Festival	13 September 2018	Film and Literature Award	Burning	Nominated	
Film by the Sea International Film Festival	13 September 2018	Youth Jury Award	Burning	Nominated	
Florence Korea Film Fest	28 March 2019	Best Film	Burning	Won	
Florida Film Critics Circle	21 December 2018	Best Supporting Actor	Steven Yeun	Won	
Florida Film Critics Circle	21 December 2018	Best Foreign Language Film	Burning	Nominated	
Gay and Lesbian Entertainment Critics Association	8 January 2019	Foreign Language Film of the Year	Burning	Nominated	
Georgia Film Critics Association	12 January 2019	Best Foreign Film	Burning	Nominated	
Golden Trailer Awards	29 May 2019	Best Foreign Thriller Trailer	Burning	Nominated	
Golden Trailer Awards	29 May 2019	Best Foreign Poster	Burning	Nominated	
Grand Bell Awards	22 October 2018	Best Film	Burning	Won	
Grand Bell Awards	22 October 2018	Best Director	Lee Chang-dong	Nominated	
Grand Bell Awards	22 October 2018	Best Actor	Yoo Ah-in	Nominated	
Grand Bell Awards	22 October 2018	Best Supporting Actor	Steven Yeun	Nominated	
Grand Bell Awards	22 October 2018	Best New Actress	Jeon Jong-seo	Nominated	
Grand Bell Awards	22 October 2018	Best Cinematography	Hong Kyung-pyo	Nominated	
Grand Bell Awards	22 October 2018	Best Lightning	Kim Chang-ho	Nominated	
Grand Bell Awards	22 October 2018	Best Music	Mowg	Nominated	
Greater Western New York Film Critics Association	28 December 2018	Best Picture	Burning	Nominated	
Greater Western New York Film Critics Association	28 December 2018	Best Director	Lee Chang-dong	Nominated	
Greater Western New York Film Critics Association	28 December 2018	Best Supporting Actor	Steven Yeun	Won	
Greater Western New York Film Critics Association	28 December 2018	Best Adapted Screenplay	Oh Jung-mi, Lee Chang-dong	Nominated	
Greater Western New York Film Critics Association	28 December 2018	Best Foreign Film	Burning	Won (Note: Shared with Roma.)	
Haifa International Film Festival	29 September 2018	Carmel Award	Burning	Nominated	
Hawaii Film Critics Society	12 January 2019	Best Foreign Language Film	Burning	Nominated	
Houston Film Critics Society	3 January 2019	Best Foreign Language Film	Burning	Nominated	
Independent Spirit Awards	23 February 2019	Best International Film	Burning	Nominated	
IndieLisboa International Independent Film Festival	12 May 2019	Silvestre Award for Best Feature Film	Burning	Nominated	
IndieWire Critics Poll	17 December 2018	Best Film	Burning	3rd place	
IndieWire Critics Poll	17 December 2018	Best Director	Lee Chang-dong	2nd place	
IndieWire Critics Poll	17 December 2018	Best Supporting Actor	Steven Yeun	Won	
IndieWire Critics Poll	17 December 2018	Best Screenplay	Oh Jung-mi, Lee Chang-dong	5th place	
IndieWire Critics Poll	17 December 2018	Best Foreign Language Film	Burning	2nd place	
International Adana Film Festival	29 September 2018	Golden Boll International Best Feature	Burning	Won	
International Cinephile Society	3 February 2019	Best Picture	Burning	Runner-up	
International Cinephile Society	3 February 2019	Best Director	Lee Chang-dong	Nominated	
International Cinephile Society	3 February 2019	Best Actor	Yoo Ah-in	Nominated	
International Cinephile Society	3 February 2019	Best Supporting Actor	Steven Yeun	Runner-up	
International Cinephile Society	3 February 2019	Best Supporting Actress	Jeon Jong-seo	Nominated	
International Cinephile Society	3 February 2019	Best Adapted Screenplay	Oh Jung-mi, Lee Chang-dong	Won	
International Cinephile Society	3 February 2019	Best Cinematography	Hong Kyung-pyo	Nominated	
International Cinephile Society	3 February 2019	Best Original Score	Mowg	Runner-up	
International Cinephile Society	3 February 2019	Best Film Not in the English Language	Burning	Runner-up	
International Cinephile Society Cannes Awards	19 May 2018	Palme d'Or	Burning	Won	
Key West Film Festival	18 November 2018	Best Foreign Language Film	Burning	Won	
Kinema Junpo Awards	11 February 2020	Best Foreign Film	Burning	10th place	
KOFRA Film Awards	30 January 2019	Best Director	Lee Chang-dong	Won	
Korean Association of Film Critics Awards	13 November 2018	Top 11 Films	Burning	Won	
Korean Association of Film Critics Awards	13 November 2018	FIPRESCI Award	Burning	Won	
Korean Association of Film Critics Awards	13 November 2018	Best Cinematography	Hong Kyung-pyo	Won	
Latino Entertainment Film Awards	20 January 2019	Best Foreign Language Film	Burning	Nominated	
London Film Week	13 December 2018	Best Film	Burning	Won	
London Film Week	13 December 2018	Best Director	Lee Chang-dong	Won	
London Film Week	13 December 2018	Best Screenplay	Oh Jung-mi, Lee Chang-dong	Won	
Los Angeles Film Critics Association	9 December 2018	Best Film	Burning	Runner-up	
Los Angeles Film Critics Association	9 December 2018	Best Supporting Actor	Steven Yeun	Won	
Los Angeles Film Critics Association	9 December 2018	Best Foreign Language Film	Burning	Won (Note: Shared with Shoplifters.)	
Los Angeles Online Film Critics Society Awards	7 December 2018	Best Foreign Film	Burning	Nominated	
Mainichi Film Awards	13 February 2020	Foreign Film Best One Award	Burning	Nominated	
Manaki Brothers Film Festival	29 September 2018	Golden Camera 300	Hong Kyung-pyo	Won	
Miami International Film Festival	10 March 2019	Knight Marimbas Award	Burning	Nominated	
Miami International Film Festival	10 March 2019	Alacran Music in Film Award	Mowg	Won	
Miskolc International Film Festival	22 September 2018	Emeric Pressburger Prize	Burning	Nominated	
MOOOV Film Festival	26 April 2019	Sembène Award	Burning	Won	
Munich International Film festival	7 July 2018	Best International Film	Burning	Nominated	
National Board of Review	27 November 2018	Top Five Foreign Language Film	Burning	Won	
National Society of Film Critics	5 January 2019	Best Film	Burning	Runner-up	
National Society of Film Critics	5 January 2019	Best Director	Lee Chang-dong	Runner-up	
National Society of Film Critics	5 January 2019	Best Supporting Actor	Steven Yeun	Won	
National Society of Film Critics	5 January 2019	Best Foreign Language Film	Burning	Runner-up	
New Mexico Film Critics Awards	9 December 2018	Best Film	Burning	Runner-up	
New Mexico Film Critics Awards	9 December 2018	Best Director	Lee Chang-dong	Runner-up	
New Mexico Film Critics Awards	9 December 2018	Best Adapted Screenplay	Oh Jung-mi, Lee Chang-dong	Won	
New Mexico Film Critics Awards	9 December 2018	Best Foreign Language Film	Burning	Won	
North Carolina Film Critics Association	2 January 2019	Best Foreign Language Film	Burning	Nominated	
North Texas Film Critics Association	18 December 2018	Best Foreign Language Film	Burning	3rd place	
Online Film Critics Society	2 January 2019	Best Supporting Actor	Steven Yeun	Nominated	
Online Film Critics Society	2 January 2019	Best Foreign Language Film	Burning	Nominated	
Online Film & Television Association	10 February 2019	Best Foreign Language Film	Burning	Nominated	
Oslo Film from the South Festival	17 November 2018	Silver Mirror Award	Burning	Won	
Oslo Film from the South Festival	17 November 2018	Audience Award	Burning	Nominated	
Palm Springs International Film Festival	14 January 2019	Best Foreign Language Film	Burning	Nominated	
Palm Springs International Film Festival	14 January 2019	Ricky Jay Magic of Cinema Award	Burning	Nominated	
Phoenix Critics Circle	17 December 2018	Best Foreign Language Film	Burning	Nominated	
Pingyao International Film Festival	15 October 2018	Crouching Tiger Hidden Dragon East-West Award	Lee Chang-dong	Won	
Prêmio Guarani de Cinema Brasileiro	28 December 2019	Filme Estrangeiro (Best Foreign Film)	Burning	Nominated	
Prix des auditeurs du Masque et la Plume	17 February 2019	Films Étrangers (Best Foreign Film)	Burning	5th place	
Robert Awards	3 February 2019	Best Non-English Language Film	Burning	Nominated	
San Francisco Film Critics Circle	9 December 2018	Best Foreign Language Film	Burning	Nominated	
Santa Barbara International Film Festival	9 February 2019	Virtuoso Award	Steven Yeun	Won	
Saturn Award	13 September 2019	Best Supporting Actor	Steven Yeun	Nominated	
Saturn Award	13 September 2019	Best Writing	Oh Jung-mi, Lee Chang-dong	Nominated	
Saturn Award	13 September 2019	Best International Film	Burning	Won	
Seattle Film Critics Society	17 December 2018	Best Actor in a Supporting Role	Steven Yeun	Nominated	
Seattle Film Critics Society	17 December 2018	Best Foreign Language Film	Burning	Nominated	
ShinFilm Art Film Festival	8 September 2018	Shin Sang-ok Director Award	Lee Chang-dong	Won	
Sitges Film Festival	13 October 2018	Best Film	Burning	Nominated	
Stockholm Film Festival	18 November 2018	FIPRESCI Award	Burning	Nominated	
The Seoul Awards	27 October 2018	Best Film	Burning	Nominated	
The Seoul Awards	27 October 2018	Best Actor	Yoo Ah-in	Nominated	
The Seoul Awards	27 October 2018	Best New Actress	Jeon Jong-seo	Nominated	
Toronto Film Critics Association	9 December 2018	Best Film	Burning	Runner-up	
Toronto Film Critics Association	9 December 2018	Best Director	Lee Chang-dong	Runner-up	
Toronto Film Critics Association	9 December 2018	Best Supporting Actor	Steven Yeun	Won	
Toronto Film Critics Association	9 December 2018	Best Foreign Language Film	Burning	Won	
Tour du Cinéma Français	12 November 2018	Etoile du Cinéma Award	Burning	Won	
Turkish Film Critics Association	26 March 2020	Best Foreign Film	Burning	3rd place	
Utah Film Critics Association	16 December 2018	Best Non-English Language Film	Burning	Runner-up	
Vancouver Film Critics Circle	17 December 2018	Best Supporting Actor	Steven Yeun	Nominated	
Vancouver Film Critics Circle	17 December 2018	Best Foreign Language Film	Burning	Nominated	
Washington D.C. Area Film Critics Association	3 December 2018	Best Foreign Language Film	Burning	Nominated	
World Cinema Amsterdam	25 August 2018	Best Film	Burning	Nominated	

== See also ==
- List of South Korean films of 2018
