= Hong Kyung-pyo =

South Korean cinematographer

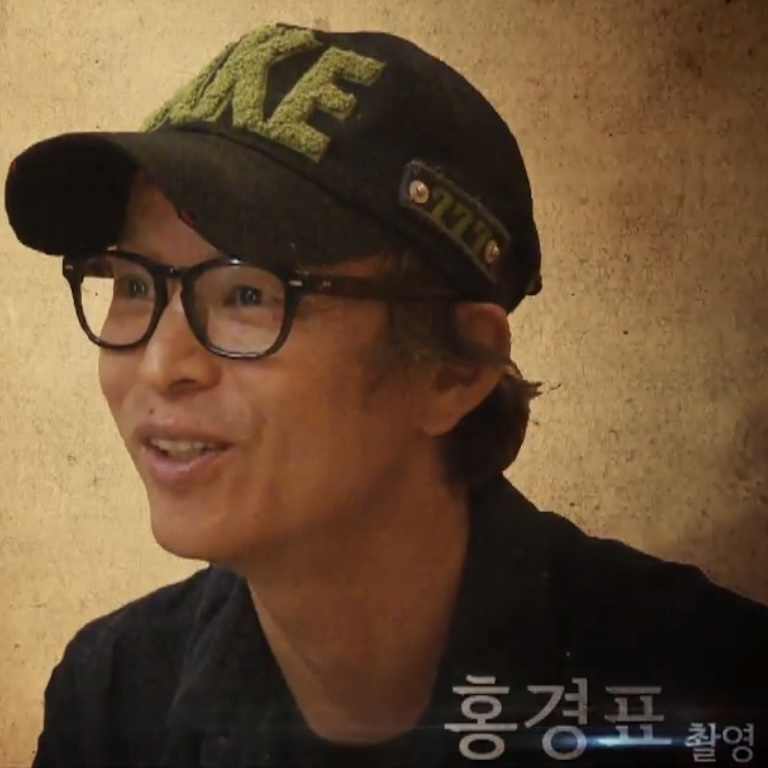
- Hong in 2017
- Born: August 11, 1962 (age 64); Chilgok, North Gyeongsang Province, South Korea
- Other name: Alex Hong
- Occupation: Cinematographer
- Years active: 1989–present

Korean name
- Hangul: 홍경표
- Hanja: 洪坰杓
- RR: Hong Gyeongpyo
- MR: Hong Kyŏngp'yo

Hong Kyung-pyo (Korean: 홍경표, born August 11, 1962), also known as Alex Hong, is a South Korean cinematographer. In 2025, he became the first cinematographer to win the Grand Prize for Film at the 61st Baeksang Arts Awards for his work in Harbin. His most known films are Bong Joon Ho's Parasite and Lee Chang-dong's Burning.

He has worked with several acclaimed film directors, including Bong Joon Ho, Lee Chang-dong, Kang Je-gyu, Kim Ji-woon, Na Hong-jin, Lee Sang-il, and Hirokazu Kore-eda.

== Early life ==
Hong Kyung-pyo was born on August 11, 1962, the third of four brothers. Hong was raised in Waegwan, Chilgok County, North Gyeongsang Province, located near a U.S. military base. Hong was a high-achieving student through middle school, but his academic performance declined during his high school years in Daegu. This period of instability led to his expulsion during his second year. After transferring to Yangmok High School in his hometown, Hong briefly ran away to Seoul with a friend. Upon returning a month later, he refocused on his studies with the goal of eventually establishing himself in Seoul. Following his graduation from Yangmok High School in 1981, Hong enrolled in the economics department of a college near Seoul. He remained there for one year before withdrawing from the program.

== Career ==
=== Career beginnings ===
After dropping out of college, Hong remained uncertain about his future. In 1987, the improving quality of television commercials sparked his interest in a film career. The purchase of a camcorder by his elder brother marked the beginning of his filmmaking endeavors. The following year, he bought a video production textbook at Kyobo Bookstore in Gwanghwamun, and the author's contact information led him to the Korean Society of Cinematographers. Hong then become member of Korean Society of Cinematographers.

In 1989, Hong started as a cinematographer's assistant on the film All That Falls Has Wings. At 27, he was older than most assistants, who were usually 21 or 22. Hong's early experiences in Chungmuro motivated him to pursue further study, particularly after being profoundly affected by Andrei Tarkovsky's Mirror. He grew frustrated with the Chungmuro apprenticeship system, which mandated at least five years of work as an assistant before one could become a cinematographer.

Hong went to Los Angeles in 1991 as an assistant cinematographer for the film Camels Don't Cry Alone. He chose to stay until 1994, a period he has referred to as his "period of wandering." While living at a homestay in Santa Monica, he spent most of his time watching films. He did not go to film school but rented and watched about 800 to 900 films from a local video store, including classic, Hong Kong, and Chinese movies. He intentionally avoided using a camera, except for occasional part-time work to support himself, believing he would "pick it up again when I'm sure what to film." His first real job in Los Angeles was overseeing the filming for Kim Soo-hee's film The Harmonica of Grief.

=== Debut and early acclaim ===
Upon returning to South Korea, Hong began his career as a cinematographer in 1998 with Im Sang-soo's film, Girls' Night Out. For this project, he utilized a silver retention process to achieve a metallic aesthetic. In 1999, he used 16mm film for Kim Si-eon's film Fly Low. He garnered immediate attention for his distinctive use of light and color, experimentalism, and creativity. Both films were selected for the 'New Currents' main competition section at the Busan International Film Festival.

That same year, Hong worked as cinematographer in Min Byung-chun's Phantom: The Submarine. He utilized a "dry-for-wet" technique to achieve underwater visuals without actual water, similar to methods used in Hollywood films such as Crimson Tide. For a 25-minute submarine combat sequence, Hong maintained dense smog on a 400-square-meter set for 36 days, using approximately 200 liters of oil-based smog. To simulate an underwater environment, he continuously adjusted smog concentration, filters, and lighting while sealing the set throughout the winter. Although considered safe, the conditions required the crew to wear gas masks. Initially, crew members expressed concern that the footage resembled toys in a blurry fog rather than a deep-sea environment.

By the end of 1999, Cine21 recognized Hong as Cinematographer of the Year for his technical contributions to Korean cinema, noting his use of the "dry-for-wet" technique. His work on the film incorporated artificial lighting and vibrant colors to convey the somber atmosphere and a stylized visual tone.

=== Collaborations and rising profile ===
In 2000, Hong served as cinematographer for three films: Kim Jee-woon's The Foul King, Lee Hyun-seung's Il Mare, and E J-yong's film Asako in Ruby Shoes.

The 2002 film Champion marked a turning point for Hong, as it was his first project where he exercised direct oversight over the lighting department. Previously, he had deferred to lighting directors, often noting tonal inconsistencies as a result. With Champion, he reduced these discrepancies, aligning the visual tone more closely with his intentions. The boxing sequence set in Las Vegas incorporated computer graphics to achieve camera movement through the ring ropes. Due to the film's modest box office performance, these technical elements received limited widespread attention.

In Jang Joon-hwan's Save the Green Planet!, Hong executed a sequence featuring a continuous camera transition from the exterior to the interior of a building. The film utilized a range of visual techniques, including diverse flashback sequences, inventive framing, and open-angle filming. For scenes requiring an intense depiction of blood, Hong used a film stock other than Kodak for the first time. For flashback sequences, he employed a silver retention development process, leaving a high concentration of silver particles on the film to achieve a distinct look. While Director Jang envisioned a style akin to Panic Room, budget constraints limited the realization of certain aspects of their shared artistic vision.

Hong's cinematography in Kang Je-gyu's 2004 war film Taegukgi: The Brotherhood of War was noted for its intensity and scale, drawing comparisons to Saving Private Ryan. The film portrayed the Korean War through extensive close-quarters shooting and frequent close-ups—a style favored by Director Kang to convey battlefield chaos—alongside low-angle shots to ground the war scenes.

To capture explosion effects, Hong commissioned engineer Song Seon-dae to build a custom, remote-controlled vibrating device, opting for local production due to the limited three-week rental period for international equipment. Song created the device within a month using a motor sourced from Cheonggyecheon to shake the camera and mimic the impact of explosions. Because movie cameras use a spinning mirror (typically set at 180 degrees) for smooth video, reducing this angle to 90, 45, or 25 degrees creates a choppier motion. Given the camera's approximately 25-kilogram weight, inducing natural shaking was challenging, making the custom device necessary. Hong's work on the film earned multiple accolades, including Best Cinematography at the Grand Bell Awards, the Blue Dragon Film Awards, the Korean Association of Film Critics Awards, and the Golden Cinematography Awards. Later that year, Hong served as cinematographer for E J-yong short film Joy of love (2004).

In 2007, he worked on Lee Myung-se's film M, receiving Best Cinematography at the Korean Association of Film Critics Awards and the Technical Award at the Busan Film Critics Awards. While Hong was in Los Angeles—commuting between Mexico and the Dominican Republic for a project titled Fire Bay—production was abruptly postponed a week before filming was scheduled to begin. During this period, he met Bong Joon-ho, who was visiting the United States. Bong asked about Hong's availability and invited him to work on Mother, noting an appreciation for Hong's ability to convey subtle messages through color, which he felt suited the film's delicate aesthetic.

=== International recognition and Grand Prize ===
Na Hong-jin selected Hong as the cinematographer for The Wailing following a recommendation from actor Kim Yun-seok, who had previously worked with Hong on Sea Fog. Kim believed their personalities would complement each other, saying to Na, "I think you both have similar energies," prompting Na to offer Hong the script.

Hong later reunited with Bong Joon-ho for the film Parasite. Principal photography spanned from May 18 to September 19, 2018, with locations in Seoul and Jeonju. For the production, Hong used Arri Alexa 65 cameras paired with Angénieux zoom lens.For practical lighting, he requested sophisticated indirect illumination alongside the warmth of tungsten light sources. Prior to set construction, Hong and art director Lee Ha-jun conducted multiple site visits to track the sun's movement and collaboratively determine optimal set placement. Reviewer Zack Sharf noted Hong as a cinematographer to watch, highlighting his dynamic camerawork. Director Bong Joon-ho has stated that he intends to work with Hong on all of his future Korean films.

At the 61st Baeksang Arts Awards, Hong received the Grand Prize in the film category in the film category for his work on Harbin. This marked a milestone in the awards' history as the first time the Grand Prize was awarded to a crew member rather than a film, director, or actor.

In his acceptance speech, Hong shared the honor with his crew, stating, "Harbin was filmed in Mongolia, Latvia, and Korea in the cold midwinter under strong winds and harsh cold. I would like to share this honor and joy with all my comrades on the set of the film who have put their passion and dedication into achieving artistic perfection."

== Filming style ==
Hong Kyung-pyo utilizes an integrated director of photography system that combines camera and lighting operations under the cinematographer's control. During his four years in Los Angeles working on local productions, including Kim Soo-hee's Harmonica of Sorrow, he observed that American crews merged filming and lighting responsibilities, unlike the separate departments common in Chungmuro at the time.

Upon returning to Korea, Hong introduced this integrated shooting and lighting approach. He stated, "Because light comes first and that light comes through the lens, how and at what angle the light is handled determines the quality of the shooting." Although the system initially faced industry resistance, its adoption became a defining aspect of his production workflow.

Hong's crew training prioritizes collaborative workflow and communication across departments, such as lighting and grip teams, over technical skills alone. Excluding the B camera unit, his standard crew typically consists of a four-person camera team handling exposure, focus, equipment, and film management; a five-person lighting team; and a five-person grip team.

== Filmography ==
Film(s) credit of Hong
Year	Film	Director	Notes	Ref.
1998	Fly Low	Kim Si-eon	Debut	
1998	Girls' Night Out	Im Sang-soo		
1999	Phantom: The Submarine	Min Byung-chun		
2000	The Foul King	Kim Jee-woon		
2000	Il Mare	Lee Hyun-seung		
2000	Asako in Ruby Shoes	E J-yong		
2001	Guns & Talks	Jang Jin		
2002	Champion	Kwak Kyung-taek		
2003	Save the Green Planet!	Jang Joon-hwan		
2004	Taegukgi: The Brotherhood of War	Kang Je-gyu		
2005	Typhoon	Kwak Kyung-taek		
2007	Love Exposure	Lee Eun-hee		
2007	M	Lee Myung-se		
2008	Eye for an Eye	Kwak Kyung-taek		
2009	Mother	Bong Joon Ho		
2009	Actresses	E J-yong		
2009	Timeless	Ryoo Seung-wan	short film	
2010	Haunters	Kim Min-seok		
2011	Always	Song Il-gon		
2013	Boomerang Family	Song Hae-sung		
2013	Snowpiercer	Bong Joon Ho		
2014	Sea Fog	Shim Sung-bo		
2016	The Wailing	Na Hong-jin		
2016	Run-Off	Kim Jong-hyeon		
2018	Burning	Lee Chang-dong		
2019	Parasite	Bong Joon Ho		
2020	Deliver Us From Evil	Hong Won-chan		
2022	Wandering	Lee Sang-il	Japanese film	
2022	Broker	Hirokazu Kore-eda		
2023	Project Silence	Kim Tae-gon		
2024	Harbin	Woo Min-ho		
2026	Hope	Na Hong-jin		

=== Series ===
Key
†	Denotes television productions that have not yet been released

Year	Title		Director	Notes	Ref.
Year	English	Korean	Director	Notes	Ref.
2026	Portraits of Delusion †	현혹	Han Jae-rim	Disney+ Korea Original Series	

== Accolades ==
=== Awards and nominations ===
Awards and nominations received by Hong
Award	Year	Category	Nominated work	Result	Ref.
Asian Film Awards	2019	Best Cinematography	Burning	Nominated	
Asian Film Awards	2025	Best Cinematography	Harbin	Won	
Asia-Pacific Film Festival	2013	Best Cinematography	Snowpiercer	Nominated	
Austin Film Critics Association	2019	Best Cinematography	Burning	Nominated	
Austin Film Critics Association	2020	Best Cinematography	Parasite	Nominated	
Baeksang Arts Awards	2019	Technical Award	Burning	Won	
Baeksang Arts Awards	2021	Best Technical award	Deliver Us From Evil	Nominated	
Baeksang Arts Awards	2020	Technical Award	Parasite	Nominated	
Baeksang Arts Awards	2025	Grand Prize – Film	Harbin	Won	
Baeksang Arts Awards	2025	Best Technical Achievement	Harbin	Nominated	
Blue Dragon Film Awards	2004	Best Cinematography	Taegukgi: The Brotherhood of War	Won	
Blue Dragon Film Awards	2013	Best Cinematography	Snowpiercer	Nominated	
Blue Dragon Film Awards	2014	Best Cinematography	Sea Fog	Nominated	
Blue Dragon Film Awards	2016	Best Cinematography	The Wailing	Nominated	
Blue Dragon Film Awards	2019	Best Cinematography and Lighting	Parasite (Note: Nomination was shared with Kim Chang-ho (lighting))	Nominated	
Blue Dragon Film Awards	2021	Best Cinematography and Lighting	Deliver Us From Evil	Won	
Blue Dragon Film Awards	2025	Best Cinematography and Lighting	Harbin	Won	
Blue Dragon Film Awards	2026	Best Cinematography and Lighting	Hope	Pending	
Blue Dragon Film Awards	2026	Technical Award (SFX)	Hope	Pending	
Buil Film Awards	2009	Best Cinematography	Mother	Won	
Buil Film Awards	2015	Best Cinematography	Sea Fog	Won	
Buil Film Awards	2016	Best Cinematography	The Wailing	Nominated	
Buil Film Awards	2018	Best Cinematography	Burning	Nominated	
Buil Film Awards	2019	Best Cinematography	Parasite	Won	
Buil Film Awards	2020	Best Cinematography	Deliver Us From Evil	Won	
Buil Film Awards	2025	Best Cinematography	Harbin	Nominated	
Buil Film Awards	2026	Best Cinematography	Hope	Won	
Busan Film Critics Awards	2008	Technical Award	M	Won	
Busan Film Critics Awards	2009	Technical Award	Mother	Won	
Busan Film Critics Awards	2018	Technical Award	Burning	Won	
Chunsa Film Art Awards	2000	Best New Cinematographer Award	Il Mare	Won	
Chunsa Film Art Awards	2015	Technical Award	Seafog	Nominated	
Chunsa Film Art Awards	2019	Technical Award	Burning	Nominated	
Chunsa Film Art Awards	2021	Technical Award	Snowpiercer	Nominated	
Chicago Film Critics Association Awards	2019	Best Cinematography	Parasite	Nominated	
Cine21 Film Awards	1999	Cinematographer of the Year	Phantom: The Submarine	Won	
Cine21 Film Awards	2018	Cinematographer of the Year	Burning	Won	
Cine21 Film Awards	2019	Cinematographer of the Year	Parasite	Won	
Dallas–Fort Worth Film Critics Association Awards	2019	Best Cinematography	Parasite	Runner-up	
Golden Cinematography Award	2009	Best Cinematography — Silver Award	Mother	Won	
Golden Cinematography Award	2021	Best Cinematography — Gold Award	Parasite	Won	
Grand Bell Awards	2004	Best Cinematography	Taegukgi: The Brotherhood of War	Won	
Grand Bell Awards	2013	Best Cinematography	Snowpiercer	Nominated	
Grand Bell Awards	2014	Best Cinematography	Sea Fog	Nominated	
Grand Bell Awards	2016	Best Cinematography	The Wailing	Won	
Grand Bell Awards	2018	Best Cinematography	Burning	Nominated	
Grand Bell Awards	2020	Best Cinematography	Parasite	Nominated	
Houston Film Critics Society Awards	2020	Best Cinematography	Parasite	Nominated	
International Cinephile Society	2019	Best Cinematography	Burning	Nominated	
Korean Association of Film Critics Awards	2004	Best Cinematography	Taegukgi: The Brotherhood of War	Won	
Korean Association of Film Critics Awards	2007	Best Cinematography	M	Won	
Korean Association of Film Critics Awards	2018	Best Cinematography	Burning	Won	
Korean Association of Film Critics Awards	2019	Best Cinematography	Parasite	Won	
Korean Association of Film Critics Awards	2026	Best Cinematography	Possible Love	Won	
3rd Korea Film Award	2004	Best Cinematography	Taegukgi: The Brotherhood of War	Won	
1st Korean Film Producers Association Awards	2014	Best Cinematography	Sea Fog	Won	
1st Korean Film Producers Association Awards	2016	Best Cinematography	The Wailing	Won	
Manaki Brothers Film Festival	2018	Golden Camera 300	Burning	Won	
Seattle Film Critics Society Awards	2019	Best Cinematography	Parasite	Nominated	
Sitges Film Festival	2016	Best Cinematography	The Wailing	Won	

=== State honors ===
Name of country or organization, year given, and name of honor
Country or organization	Award ceremony	Year	Honor or award	Ref.
South Korea	Korean Popular Culture and Arts Awards (Note: Honors are given at the Korean Popular Culture and Arts Awards, arranged by the Korea Creative Content Agency and hosted by the Ministry of Culture, Sports and Tourism. They are awarded to those who have contributed to the arts and South Korea's pop culture.)	2019	Presidential Commendation	

=== Listicles ===
Name of publisher, year listed, name of listicle, and placement
Publisher	Year	Listicle	Placement	Ref.
Cultura	2019	[Korean Cinema 100th Anniversary Series 9] 10 Cinematographers	Top 10	
IndieWire Critics Poll	2019	Best Cinematography for Parasite	5th Place	
