= Lee Chang-dong =

South Korean film director (born 1954)

- Lee Chang-dong in 2026
- Born: July 4, 1954 (age 72); Daegu, South Korea
- Education: Kyungpook National University (1981)
- Occupations: Film director; screenwriter
- Years active: 1997–present
- Honours: Legion of Honour - Knight (2006)

Korean name
- Hangul: 이창동
- Hanja: 李滄東
- RR: I Changdong
- MR: I Ch'angdong

Lee Chang-dong (Korean: 이창동; born July 4, 1954) is a South Korean film director, screenwriter, and novelist. He has directed seven feature films: Green Fish (1997), Peppermint Candy (1999), Oasis (2002), Secret Sunshine (2007), Poetry (2010), Burning (2018), and Possible Love (2026). Burning became the first Korean film to make it to the 91st Academy Awards' final nine-film shortlist for Best Foreign Language Film. Burning also won the Fipresci International Critics' Prize at the 71st Cannes Film Festival, Best Foreign Language Film in Los Angeles Film Critics Association, and Best Foreign Language Film in Toronto Film Critics Association.

Lee has won Silver Lion for Best Director and Fipresci International Critics' Prize at the 2002 Venice Film Festival, the Best Screenplay Award at the 2010 Cannes Film Festival and Grand Jury Prize at the 2026 Venice Film Festival. He also won the award for Achievement in Directing at the 4th Asia Pacific Screen Awards in 2017, Jury Grand Prize at the 2018 Asia Pacific Screen Awards, Best Director and Lifetime Achievement Award at the 13th Asian Film Awards in 2019, and he has been nominated for the Golden Lion and the Palme d'Or. Lee served as South Korea's Minister of Culture and Tourism from 2003 to 2004.

== Early life ==
Lee Chang-dong was born in Daegu, South Korea, the fifth of six children, to an impoverished leftist activist father and hanbok seamstress mother. Unmotivated as a student at first, Lee was introduced to foreign literature and theatre by his older brother, and helped run the literature club at his secondary school. He graduated in 1981 with a degree in Korean Literature from Kyungpook National University in Daegu, where he spent much of his time in the theater, writing and directing plays. He went on to teach high school Korean and established himself as a novelist with his first novel Chonri in 1983. Around that time, he married aspiring writer Lee Jung-ran; their first child died in a traffic accident in 1985. Lee began growing his involvement in politics afterwards, emboldened by the pro-democracy movement at the time.

== Career ==
Lee had no formal training in filmmaking. He was approached by Park Kwang-su to write the screenplay for To the Starry Island. Lee negotiated an assistant director (AD) position as part of the deal and was promoted to first AD on the first day of the shoot when the original first AD failed to show up. The film was released in 1993. He later wrote A Single Spark in 1995, which won Best Film at the 1995 Blue Dragon Film Awards.

After his contemporaries encouraged him to finally step behind the director's chair, Lee made Green Fish, a "critique of Korean society told through the eyes of a young man who becomes enmeshed in the criminal underworld", in 1997. Green Fish won Best Film at Blue Dragon Film Awards, Dragons and Tigers Award at the Vancouver International Film Festival and NETPAC Award's Special Mention at the Rotterdam International Film Festival.

In 2000, Lee made Peppermint Candy, chronicling a single man in reverse chronology through 20 years of South Korean history—from the student demonstrations of the 1980s to the film's 2000 release. The movie won the Special Jury Prize at Bratislava International Film Festival and three awards at the Karlovy Vary International Film Festival including the Don Quixote Award, Special Jury Prize and NETPAC Award. The film also won Best Film at the Grand Bell Awards of Korea.

In 2002, Lee released Oasis about a mentally ill man and a woman with cerebral palsy, winning the Silver Lion for Best Director at the 2003 Venice Film Festival. Oasis was the Korean entry for Best Foreign Language Film at the 75th Academy Awards. In 2003, it got the Chief Dan George Humanitarian Award at the Vancouver International Film Festival and the Venice International Film Festival's Special Director's Award, FIPRESCI Prize and SIGNIS Award. Lee won the Baeksang Arts Award for Best Director. Oasis was nominated at the 2005 Independent Spirit Awards for Best Foreign Film.

From 2003-04, Lee was his country's minister of culture and tourism. On the political appointment, he said:

At the time of President Roh Moo-hyun's election campaign, one of the things he promised was that his Minister of Culture would be selected from the field of culture and art rather than a professional politician. Well, he got elected, and a lot of people recommended me as this new Minister of Culture. I never thought that this was an outfit that suited me particularly well, but had to accept it as one of those bitter cups one has to accept in the course of life.

In October 2006, Lee was awarded the Chevalier (Knight) order of the Legion d'Honneur (Legion of Honor) by the French government for "his contribution to maintaining the screen quota to promote cultural diversity as a cultural minister." It was delivered to the French Embassy in Seoul by French Minister of Culture Renaud Donnedieu de Vabres during an official visit.

Lee's fourth film, Secret Sunshine about a grieving mother who loses her son, was completed in 2007. At the 60th Cannes Film Festival, the film was in the competition category with lead actress Jeon Do-yeon, winning the Prix d'interprétation féminine. It was released in South Korea in 2007 and served as the country's nominee for Best Foreign Language Film of the 2008 Academy Awards. Secret Sunshine won Best Feature Film at the Asia Pacific Screen Awards; Best Film and Best Director at the 2008 Asian Film Awards; Best Picture and Best Director at the Korean Film Awards; Best Director at the Director's Cut Awards; and Special Award at the Grand Bell Awards.

In 2009, Lee was appointed to the jury of the international competition at the 61st Cannes Film Festival along with Isabelle Huppert, Shu Qi and Robin Wright.

Released the following year, Lee's film Poetry tells a of a suburban woman in her 60s who begins to develop an interest in poetry while struggling with Alzheimer's disease and her irresponsible grandson. It garnered positive critical reviews and won Best Screenplay at the 2010 Cannes Film Festival. The starring role was played by Yoon Jeong-hee, who returned to the screen after an absence of 16 years. For this film, Lee won Achievement in Directing at the Asia Pacific Screen Awards. Poetry also won Best Film and Best Screenplay at the 2010 Grand Bell Awards and Best Director at the 2011 Baeksang Arts Awards.

In 2018, Lee returned after an eight-year hiatus with the psychological drama mystery film Burning, based on one of Haruki Murakami's 17 short stories in The Elephant Vanishes, "Barn Burning". The film premiered at the 71st Cannes Film Festival, winning the Fipresci International Critics' Prize. It became the highest-rated film in the history of Screen International's Cannes jury grid. Burning was selected as Korea's nominee for Best Foreign Language Film at the 91st Academy Awards,. It was the first Korean film to make it to the shortlist of the final nine of the award. Burning also won the Best Foreign Language Film at the Los Angeles Film Critics Association, Best Foreign Language Film in Toronto Film Critics Association, and runner-up of the National Board of Review's Top Five Foreign Language Film. For this film, Lee won Best Director at the 2018 Buil Film Awards and 2019 KOFRA Film Awards. In addition to international acclaim, "Burning won the 2018 Grand Bell Awards for Best Film and FIPRESCI Award at the Korean Association of Film Critics Awards.

In March 2019, Lee won the Best Director for Burning and the Lifetime Achievement Award at the 13th Asian Film Awards. In 2021, he was appointed to head the jury of the international competition at the 15th Asian Film Awards. He also worked with Jason Yu's first film "Sleep" along with Bong Joon-ho.

In May 2025, Lee's next movie Possible Love was announced with Netflix on board as the film's distributor, for release in 2026.

== Political beliefs ==
Lee was born in Daegu, the most conservative and rightist city in Korea, to lower middle-class parents, who were left-leaning, particularly his father. His family came from the educated noble class of the old Korea. This contradiction of growing up in an ex-noble family with socialist ties shaped his character, and subsequently his film style.

Lee supported Roh Moo-hyun's candidacy since 2002, and after he won the elections, Lee served in the office as Minister of Culture from 2003 to 2004. During his term, Lee proposed a screen quota for independent film but his proposal met with fierce opposition by the Korean movie industry and American trade officials and diplomats; he cut the quota in half. However, in October 2006, he was rewarded for his efforts with the Chevalier (Knight) order of the Legion d'Honneur (Legion of Honor) by the French government for "his contribution to maintaining the screen quota to promote cultural diversity as a cultural minister".

Lee has been boycotting and refusing to attend the Blue Dragon Film Awards ceremony since 2002 due to political conflicts with The Chosun Ilbo, a conservative South Korean newspaper which hosts the awards. Consequently, since 2002 his films have never been submitted to the competition and were excluded from the nomination for the award's best picture and best director.

For nearly a decade until 2017, during the Lee Myung-bak and Park Geun-hye presidential administrations, Lee was blacklisted by the government. Artists such as Lee that were put on the blacklist were subject to investigations and denial of subsidies. Lee recalls of his eight-year-hiatus:

During these eight years, I questioned myself a lot: what kind of films I want to make and what kind of films am I going to make for my audience? Actually, it wasn't necessary to catch up for such a long time: I just could've easily made films that people wanted to see, with a touch of my personal style so they could be critically acclaimed, but I was looking for my own films, that's all I can speak and talk about. At the time I was thinking about people's anger: everybody I knew back then was angry, no matter their religion or nationality or differences. (Burning) original story put me in connection with my own questions and story.

== Film and directing style ==
Lee describes his creative process as one of utter despair. All his films are dark stories of innocence lost, suffering and alienation. His key themes have been consistently about psychological trauma. Rather than allowing his characters simply to wallow in their misery, Lee draws them into situations that make them search, often futilely, for the meaning of life. Memory has often been an important theme for Lee. His work can be defined by the tragedy genre and his stories almost always involve his characters experiencing some degree of suffering.

His films are the reflection of the repressive social and political climate of the South Korea, and depictions of marginalized blue-collar Koreans. His characters are characteristically anti-heroic, but he seems to justify them due to their background. Through realistic portraits of troubled characters, Lee asks the audience to examine themselves and to look at what society pushes under the rug. However, he shies away from masking his themes with bold surrealism. Instead, he's more driven by naturalism.

Lee doesn't give too specific direction when he works with actors. He believes that an actor's reaction is more important than the action. He doesn't have a particular method of directing. He doesn't tell the actors to act or be in a certain way. Instead, he tells them to become the persona, the character in the film. He said,

"What I try to have them do is become the character, to feel like the character. I do not try to be very specific in how I direct my actors, for instance I will not say things like 'Use this expression' or 'Speak this way', or 'Can you please raise the pitch of your voice a bit higher' or anything like that." And, "Sometimes, actors expect from me a bit more detail, to give them specific advise but I don't do that. But what I DO sometimes is to tell them different stories, or speak about other things that do not seem to have anything in common with what the actors should be playing, but indirectly might help them feel the same way as the character feels so that they become the character."

It was talked about that there is a lot of pressure on a Lee Chang-dong set. In response to the pressures felt by Moon So-ri and Sul Kyung-gu on his film set, Lee said,

"[...] I've never raised my voice, and I'm never really about giving any sort of strict direction, especially when it comes to working with the actors. When it comes to acting, I really prefer the actors to find themselves in the character, and find themselves living in the situations, themselves. I'm not someone to tell them, or to instruct them how to express whatever in a certain sort of situation." And, "[...] One of the things that I say a lot to my actors is, 'Don't act'. That be a bit flabbergasting to actors, because, 'Wait, I'm an actor, I'm supposed to act. What do you mean? What does that mean?' That can come as a confusing statement."

== Literature ==
In 1987, Lee published his first short story, "Possession", followed by the novella There's a Lot of Shit in Nokcheon in 1992 which won him The Korea Times Literary Prize, and then Tenaciousness in 1996.

Lee said about his writing style,

"I always wrote for one person, for this person who thought and felt the same way as I do. It almost felt like I was writing a love letter to this very specific person who would understand what I'm writing and share the same feelings and thoughts."

In 2007, Lee's short story, "The Dreaming Beast" (translated by Heinz Insu Fenkl), was published in the journal AZALEA. In 2018, his short story, "On Destiny" (translated by Soyoung Kim), was published in the journal Asymptote.

In 2023, Lee's short story, "Snowy Day" (translated by Heinz Insu Fenkl and Yoosup Chang), was published in the March 6th, 2023 issue of The New Yorker. In 2024, Lee's short story, "The Leper" (translated by Heinz Insu Fenkl) was also published in the December 30th, 2024 and January 6, 2025 double issue of The New Yorker.

Lee's first collection of short stories in English, Snowy Day & Other Stories (translated by Heinz Insu Fenkl and Yoosup Chang), was published to acclaim by Penguin Random House in early 2025. The collection includes four short stories and three novellas taken from his two original Korean collections, There's a Lot of Shit in Nokcheon (1992) and Burning Paper (1987).

== Personal life ==
Lee is the third son out of four brothers. He said that they were very close and called themselves fraternity brothers. His youngest brother, Lee Joon-dong, is a film producer for Lee's films. Lee hoped to become a painter growing up, but he could not afford art supplies. Lee and the president of MBC television and radio network company, Choi Seung-ho, are old friends and Kyungpook National University alumni. He personally asked Choi to appear in Burning playing as Jong-su's father. He is also a close friend of his frequent collaborator, actor Moon Sung-keun.

Lee has been married to writer Lee Jung-ran since the early 1980s. Their firstborn son died in an accident in 1985; their other two children are still living.

== Filmography ==
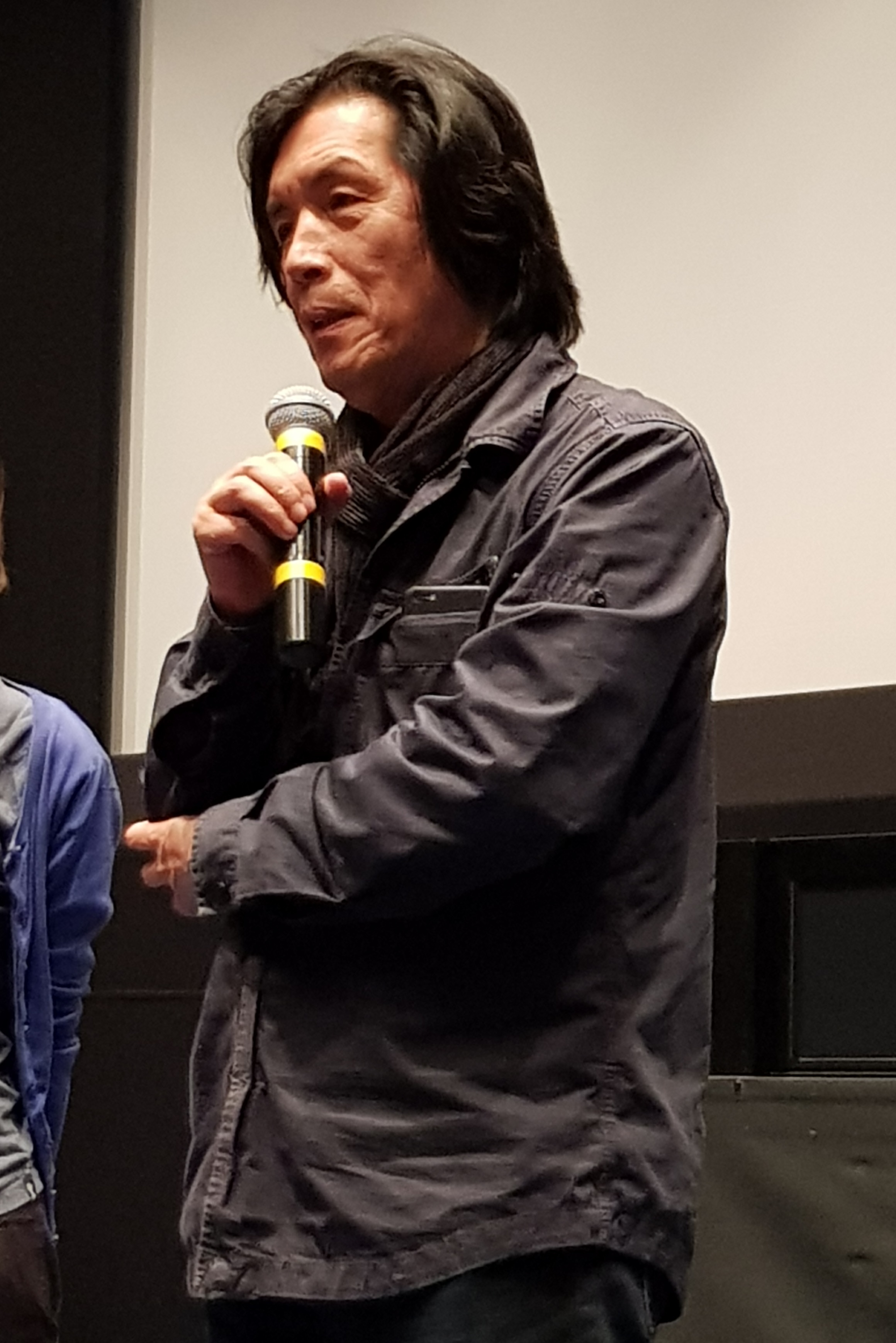
Lee at the French Cinematheque, August 2018

=== Feature films ===
Year	English Title	Original Title	Notes
1997	Green Fish	초록 물고기	
1999	Peppermint Candy	박하사탕	
2002	Oasis	오아시스	Silver Lion for Best Direction at the 2002 Venice International Film Festival; 75th Academy Awards submission for Best Foreign Language Film
2007	Secret Sunshine	밀양	Also producer 80th Academy Awards submission for Best Foreign Language Film
2010	Poetry	시	Best Screenplay at the 2010 Cannes Film Festival
2018	Burning	버닝	91st Academy Awards shortlisted for Best Foreign Language Film
2026	Possible Love	가능한 사랑	Grand Jury Prize at the 2026 Venice International Film Festival; 99th Academy Awards submission for Best International Feature Film

=== Other credits ===
Year	Title	Credited as			Notes
Year	Title	Director	Writer	Producer	Notes
1993	To the Starry Island	Assistant Director	Yes	No	
1995	A Single Spark	No	Yes	No	
2007	Never Forever	No	No	Yes	
2009	A Brand New Life	No	No	Yes	
2013	Hwayi: A Monster Boy	No	No	Yes	
2014	A Girl at My Door	No	No	Yes	
2015	Collective Invention	No	No	Yes	
2016	The World of Us	No	No	Yes	
2019	Birthday	No	No	Yes	
2022	Heartbeat	Yes	Yes	Yes	Short film

== Awards and nominations ==
=== International awards ===
Year	Award	Category	Nominated work	Result
1997	Vancouver International Film Festival	Dragons and Tigers Award	Green Fish	Won
1998	Rotterdam International Film Festival	NETPAC Award	Green Fish	Special Mention
2000	Bratislava International Film Festival	Special Jury Prize	Peppermint Candy	Won
2000	Karlovy Vary International Film Festival	Don Quijote Award	Peppermint Candy	Won
2000	Karlovy Vary International Film Festival	NETPAC Award	Peppermint Candy	Special Mention
2000	Karlovy Vary International Film Festival	Special Jury Prize	Peppermint Candy	Won
2002	Vancouver International Film Festival	Chief Dan George Humanitarian Award	Oasis	Won
2002	Venice International Film Festival	Golden Lion	Oasis	Nominated
2002	Venice International Film Festival	FIPRESCI Prize	Oasis	Won
2002	Venice International Film Festival	Silver Lion for Best Direction	Oasis	Won
2002	Venice International Film Festival	SIGNIS Award	Oasis	Won
2002	Venice International Film Festival	Premio CinemAvvenire	Oasis	Won
2003	Castellinaria International Festival of Young Cinema	Three Castles Award	Oasis	Won
2003	Gardanne Film Festival	Audience Award	Oasis	Won
2005	Independent Spirit Awards	Best Foreign Film	Oasis	Nominated
2007	Asia Pacific Screen Awards	Best Feature Film	Secret Sunshine	Won
2007	60th Cannes Film Festival	Palme d'Or	Secret Sunshine	Nominated
2008	2nd Asian Film Awards	Best Director	Secret Sunshine	Won
2008	2nd Asian Film Awards	Best Film	Secret Sunshine	Won
2010	Cannes Film Festival	Palme d'Or	Poetry	Nominated
2010	Cannes Film Festival	Best Screenplay	Poetry	Won
2010	Cannes Film Festival	Prize of the Ecumenical Jury - Special Mention	Poetry	Won
2010	Asia Pacific Screen Awards	Achievement in Directing	Poetry	Won
2012	Chlotrudis Society for Independent Films	Best Movie	Poetry	Nominated
2012	Chlotrudis Society for Independent Films	Best Original Screenplay	Poetry	Won
2018	Cannes Film Festival	Palme d'Or	Burning	Nominated
2018	Cannes Film Festival	FIPRESCI Prize	Burning	Won
2018	International Cinephile Society Cannes Awards	Palme d'Or	Burning	Won
2018	International Adana Film Festival	Golden Boll International Best Feature	Burning	Won
2018	National Board of Review	Top Five Foreign Language Film	Burning	Runner-up
2018	Los Angeles Film Critics Association	Best Foreign Language Film	Burning	Won
2018	Toronto Film Critics Association	Best Foreign Language Film	Burning	Won
2018	Tour du Cinéma Français	Etoile du Cinéma Award	Burning	Won
2018	ShinFilm Art Film Festival	Shin Sang-ok Director Award	Burning	Won
2018	Pingyao International Film Festival	Crouching Tiger Hidden Dragon East-West Award	Burning	Won
2018	Oslo Film from the South Festival	Silver Mirror Award	Burning	Won
2018	New Mexico Film Critics Awards	Best Foreign Language Film	Burning	Won
2018	New Mexico Film Critics Awards	Best Adapted Screenplay	Burning	Won
2018	Key West Film Festival	Best Foreign Language Film	Burning	Won
2018	Greater Western New York Film Critics Association	Best Foreign Language Film	Burning	Won
2018	London Film Week	Best Film	Burning	Won
2018	London Film Week	Best Director	Burning	Won
2018	London Film Week	Best Screenplay	Burning	Won
2018	Asia Pacific Screen Awards	Jury Grand Prize	Burning	Won
2019	Club Média Ciné	Best Foreign Language Film	Burning	Won
2019	International Cinephile Society	Best Adapted Screenplay	Burning	Won
2019	91st Academy Awards	Best Foreign Language Film	Burning	Shortlisted
2019	Latino Entertainment Film Awards	Best Foreign Language Film	Burning	Won
2019	Austin Film Critics Association	Best Foreign Language Film	Burning	Won
2019	International Cinephile Society	Best Adapted Screenplay	Burning	Won
2019	13th Asian Film Awards	Best Director	Burning	Won
2019	13th Asian Film Awards	Lifetime Achievement Award	Burning	Recipient
2019	MOOOV Film Festival	Sembène Award	Burning	Won
2019	45th Saturn Awards	Best International Film	Burning	Won
2019	Asian Film Critics Association Awards	Best Director	Burning	Won
2026	Mill Valley Film Festival	Auteur Award	Lee Chang-dong	Honored
2026	TIFF Tribute Awards	TIFF Ebert Director Award	Lee Chang-dong	Honored
2026	Toronto International Film Festival	International People's Choice Award	Possible Love	Runner-up
2026	83rd Venice International Film Festival	Golden Lion	Possible Love	Nominated
2026	83rd Venice International Film Festival	Grand Jury Prize	Possible Love	Won
2026	83rd Venice International Film Festival	FIPRESCI Prize	Possible Love	Won
2026	83rd Venice International Film Festival	ARCA CinemaGiovani Award for Best Film of Venezia 83	Possible Love	Won
2026	San Sebastián International Film Festival	Zabaltegi-Tabakalera Award	Possible Love	Nominated
2026	Montclair Film Festival	Fiction Feature Competition	Possible Love	Won
2026	Chicago International Film Festival	Gold Hugo	Possible Love	Nominated
2026	Denver Film Festival	Krzysztof Kieslowski Award for Best Feature Film	Possible Love	Nominated
2026	Gotham Independent Film Awards	Best International Feature	Possible Love	Pending
2026	Gotham Independent Film Awards	Best Original Screenplay	Possible Love	Pending
2026	British Independent Film Awards	Best International Independent Film	Possible Love	Pending

=== Local awards ===
Year	Award	Category	Nominated work	Result
1995	Blue Dragon Film Awards	Best Film	A Single Spark	Won
1997	Blue Dragon Film Awards	Best Film	Green Fish	Won
2000	Grand Bell Awards	Best Film	Peppermint Candy	Won
2003	Baeksang Arts Awards	Best Director	Oasis	Won
2007	Korean Film Awards	Best Picture	Secret Sunshine	Won
2007	Korean Film Awards	Best Director	Secret Sunshine	Won
2007	Director's Cut Awards	Best Director	Secret Sunshine	Won
2007	Grand Bell Awards	Special Award	Secret Sunshine	Won
2010	Grand Bell Awards	Best Film	Poetry	Won
2010	Grand Bell Awards	Best Screenplay	Poetry	Won
2011	Baeksang Arts Awards	Best Director	Poetry	Won
2018	Buil Film Awards	Best Director	Burning	Won
2018	Grand Bell Awards	Best Film	Burning	Won
2018	Korean Association of Film Critics Awards	FIPRESCI Award	Burning	Won
2018	Cine21 Film Awards	Best Film	Burning	Won
2018	Cine21 Film Awards	Best Director	Burning	Won
2019	KOFRA Film Awards	Best Director	Burning	Won
2026	Korean Association of Film Critics Awards	Best Film	Possible Love	Won
2026	Blue Dragon Film Awards	Best Screenplay	Possible Love	Pending

=== State honors ===
Name of country, year given, and name of honor
Country	Award Ceremony	Year	Honor	Ref.
France	Legion d'Honneur - Jacques Chirac Administration	2006	the Chevalier (Knight) order	
South Korea	Korean Culture and Arts Awards (Note: Since 1973, honors are given at Cultural Day (문화의 날), 3rd Saturday in October by the Ministry of Culture, Sports and Tourism)	2002	Ministry of Culture, Sports and Tourism Order of Cultural Merit	
South Korea	Republic of Korea Order of Civil Merit	2005	Blue Stripes Order of Civil Merit	

== See also ==
- List of Korean film directors
- Cinema of Korea
