= Asako in Ruby Shoes =

2000 film by E J-yong

- Theatrical release poster
- Hangul: 순애보
- RR: Sunaebo
- MR: Sunaebo
- Directed by: E J-yong
- Written by: E J-yong
- Starring: Lee Jung-jae; Misato Tachibana
- Cinematography: Hong Kyung-pyo; Masashi Chikamori
- Edited by: E J-yong; Jeong Yun-seop
- Music by: Jo Seong-woo
- Production companies: Koo & Film
- Distributed by: Cinema Service; Shochiku
- Release dates: December 9, 2000 (South Korea); October 6, 2001 (Japan)
- Running time: 117 minutes
- Countries: South Korea; Japan
- Languages: Korean; Japanese

Asako in Ruby Shoes (Korean: 순애보; Japanese: 純愛譜) is a 2000 romantic drama film written and directed by E J-yong, starring Lee Jung-jae and Misato Tachibana. It was released on December 9, 2000.

== Premise ==
The story follows Woo-in, a lonely civil servant who becomes obsessed with a webcam girl, Asako, spending recklessly to watch her daily until her impending departure drives him to seek her out in person.

== Cast ==
- Lee Jung-jae as Woo-in
- Misato Tachibana as Aya / Asako
- Kim Min-hee as Mi-a
- Ren Osugi as Aya's father
- Kimiko Yo as Aya's mother
- Kim Dong-gyun as Jong-wan
- Kim Sang-mi as Guk-jeong
- Suguru Ishii as Yusuke
- Urara Awata as Rie
- Masatoshi Matsuo as Takashi
- Lee Young-jin as Motorcycle girl
- Gi Ju-bong as Woo-in's brother-in-law
- Ha Seung-ri as Woo-in's niece
