= Burning (2018 film) =

2018 South Korean film by Lee Chang-dong

- Theatrical release poster
- Hangul: 버닝
- RR: Beoning
- MR: Pŏning
- Directed by: Lee Chang-dong
- Screenplay by: Oh Jung-mi; Lee Chang-dong
- Based on: "Barn Burning" by Haruki Murakami
- Produced by: Lee Joon-dong; Lee Chang-dong
- Starring: Yoo Ah-in; Steven Yeun; Jeon Jong-seo
- Cinematography: Hong Kyung-pyo
- Edited by: Kim Hyeon; Kim Da-won
- Music by: Mowg
- Production companies: Pinehouse Film; Now Film; NHK; Finecut
- Distributed by: CGV Arthouse (South Korea); Twin Co., Ltd (Japan)
- Release dates: May 16, 2018 (Cannes); May 17, 2018 (South Korea); February 1, 2019 (Japan)
- Running time: 148 minutes
- Countries: South Korea; Japan
- Language: Korean
- Box office: US$8.1 million

Burning (Korean: 버닝) is a 2018 South Korean psychological thriller film co-written, produced, and directed by Lee Chang-dong. The film is based on the short story "Barn Burning" from The Elephant Vanishes by Haruki Murakami, with elements inspired by William Faulkner's story of the same name. It stars Yoo Ah-in, Steven Yeun, and Jeon Jong-seo. The plot depicts a young deliveryman, Jong-su (Yoo), who runs into his childhood friend, Hae-mi (Jeon). They soon meet an enigmatic young man named Ben (Yeun), whom Jong-su becomes suspicious of, and he begins to believe Hae-mi is in danger.

The first film by Lee after a hiatus of eight years, the film premiered on May 16, 2018, at the 2018 Cannes Film Festival, where it competed for the Palme d'Or; it ended up receiving the FIPRESCI International Critics' Prize at the festival. It was released the following day in South Korea and on October 26, 2018, in the United States.

The film received widespread critical acclaim, with praise for its sense of unease, ambiguous narrative, and performances. It was selected as the South Korean entry for Best Foreign Language Film at the 91st Academy Awards; although it was not nominated, it became the first Korean film to make it to the final nine-film shortlist. It received numerous other accolades, and was included on several critics' "top ten" lists for the year 2018, notably those of The New York Times, Los Angeles Times, and the Associated Press. It has been regarded by some critics as one of the best films of the 21st century, and it was voted as the best Korean film of all time on Korean Screen, from a poll of over 150 critics from 28 countries, displacing movies like Parasite (2019), Oldboy (2003) and The Housemaid (1960).

== Plot ==
Lee Jong-su, an aspiring young novelist, performs odd jobs in Seoul. One day he runs into Shin Hae-mi, a childhood neighbor and classmate, at a promotion at which he is making a delivery. Jong-su initially does not remember her, but Hae-mi tells him she had plastic surgery. Jong-su gives her the pink watch that he won at the promotion. Later, she tells him about her upcoming trip to Africa and asks him to feed her cat, Boil, while she is away. Before Hae-mi's departure, Jong-su's father, a cattle farmer in Paju, becomes entangled in disagreeable legal affairs, and Jong-su has to return to the farm. Jong-su visits Hae-mi's apartment, where he receives instructions about feeding the cat. They then have sex.

After Hae-mi departs, Jong-su dutifully feeds her cat, although he never sees it. He does, however, presume that a cat is there because he finds feces in the litter box. He begins habitually masturbating in Hae-mi's apartment. One day Hae-mi calls, saying she had become stranded at Nairobi Airport for three days after a bombing nearby. When Jong-su comes to pick her up, she arrives with Ben, a man whom she met and bonded with during the crisis. The three go out for dinner, where Hae-mi cries and confesses that she wants to disappear. Ben is wealthy, but does not give a clear answer when asked what kind of work he does.

At Jong-su's farm, the trio smokes cannabis and Hae-mi dances topless. After Hae-mi has fallen asleep on the sofa, Ben confesses that every two months, he burns an abandoned greenhouse as a hobby. He notes that Jong-su's rural neighborhood is full of greenhouses. When asked when his next burning will take place, Ben claims it will be very soon and close to Jong-su's house. Jong-su chastises Hae-mi for disrobing in front of other men. She quietly gets into Ben's car and they drive off.

Jong-su keeps watch around the neighborhood to see if any greenhouses burn down, but none do. One afternoon, in front of an intact greenhouse that he is inspecting, he receives a call from Hae-mi, which cuts off after a few seconds of ambiguous noises. Jong-su becomes worried as she does not answer any of his calls, and begins to investigate after her phone number becomes disconnected. He convinces the landlady to let him into Hae-mi's apartment so that he can feed her cat. Hae-mi's apartment is unnaturally clean; her suitcase remains, and all signs of the cat are gone. Jong-su begins staking out Ben's Gangnam apartment and following him to see where he goes. When he sees Ben's Porsche parked outside a restaurant, he goes inside to confront him. Ben insists that he did burn down a greenhouse near Jong-su's house. A young woman approaches the table, apologizing to Ben for being late. As the three of them leave the restaurant, Jong-su asks Ben if he has heard from Hae-mi and whether she has gone on a trip. Ben says he has not heard from her, and he doubts she has gone on a trip because she could not afford it. Ben says Jong-su was the only person she trusted and that it made him jealous for the first time in his life.

One day, Ben finds Jong-su waiting outside his place and invites him up to his apartment. Ben has a new cat, which he claims is a rescued stray. In the restroom, Jong-su finds a pink watch, similar to the one he gave Hae-mi, hidden in a drawer containing other pieces of women's jewelry. When Ben's cat runs out of the apartment, Jong-su finds that it answers to the name "Boil." Jong-su silently leaves the dinner party Ben is hosting, despite Ben's pleas for him to stay.

Jong-su asks to meet Ben in the countryside, claiming he is with Hae-mi. Ben sees that Hae-mi is not there and asks Jong-su where she is; Jong-su stabs him to death. He then douses Ben's car and body in gasoline and sets them on fire, tossing his blood-soaked clothes in as well. He stumbles naked to his truck and drives off.

== Cast ==
- Yoo Ah-in as Lee Jong-su
- Steven Yeun as Ben
- Jeon Jong-seo as Shin Hae-mi
- Kim Soo-Kyung as Yeon-ju
- Choi Seung-ho as Lee Yong-seok
- Lee Joong-ok as Patrolman
- Moon Sung-keun as Lawyer
- Min Bok-gi as Judge
- Ban Hye-ra as Jong-su's mother
- Song Duk-ho as Logistics Center part-time applicant
- Lee Bong-ryun as Hae-mi's sister

== Production ==
Developed as the work of the international project which was based on one of Haruki Murakami's short stories in The Elephant Vanishes, "Barn Burning". Production was set to begin in November 2016 but was delayed by a dispute between Murakami and NHK, which owns the rights to many of Murakami's works. It also merges elements of William Faulkner's 1939 short story also called "Barn Burning". In October 2016 at the Busan International Film Festival, however, Lee said, "it is a story about young people in today's world. When they think of their lives and the world, it must feel like a mystery". In September 2017, the studio said that it had only brought the basic outlines of the story.

In 2016, it was thought that Gang Dong-won and Yoo Ah-in would feature in the film, but an official announcement was not made. On September 5, 2017, it was announced that Yoo Ah-in had been confirmed for the role of Jong-su. Three days later, newcomer Jeon Jong-seo was cast for the role of Hae-mi based on auditions which began in August. On September 20, Steven Yeun joined the film as Ben.

Principal photography began on September 11, 2017. Filming was completed on January 30, 2018, in Paju.

== Release ==
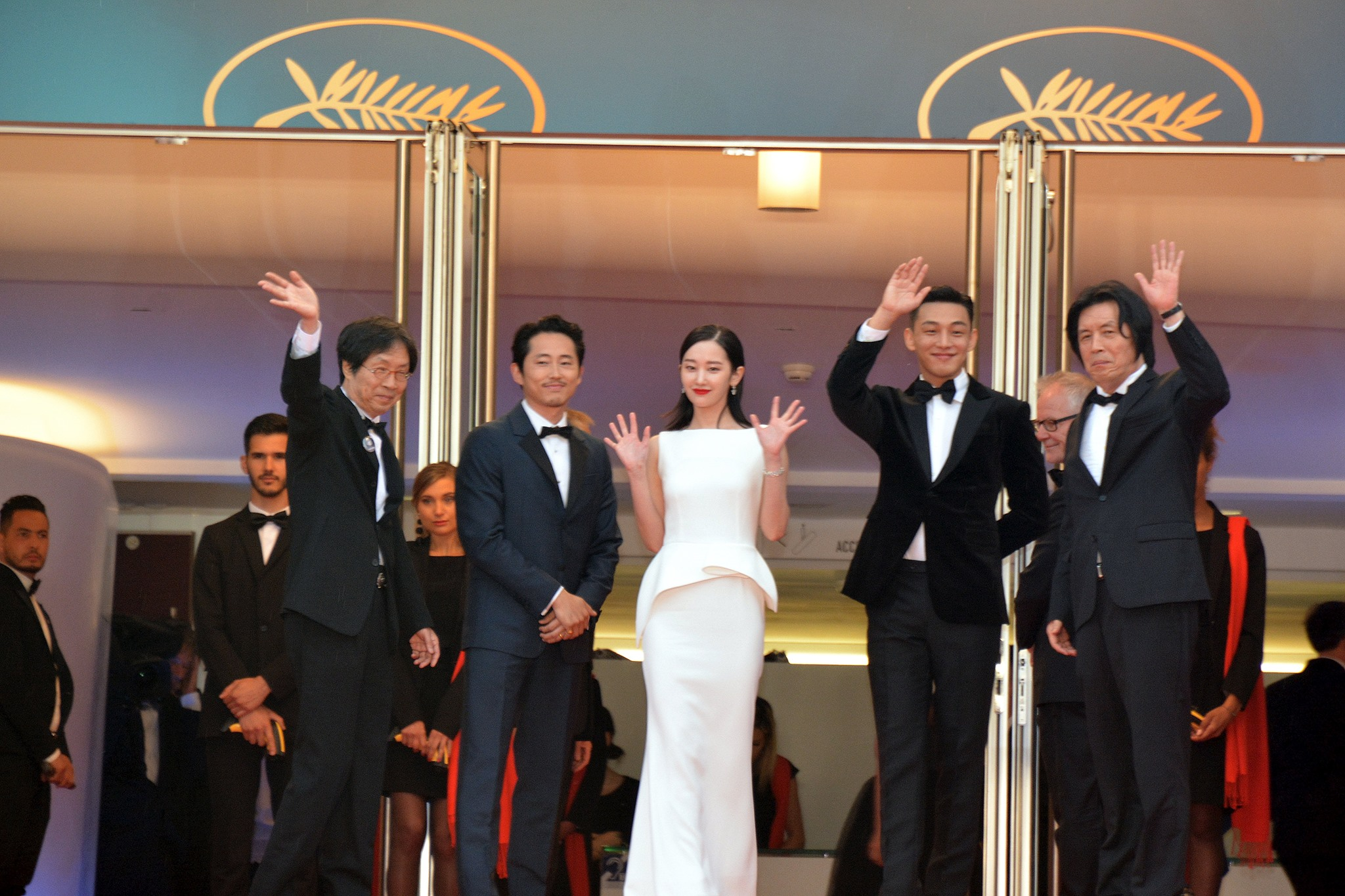
Cast and director at the 2018 Cannes Film Festival.

The first film directed by Lee Chang-dong in eight years, Burning was widely predicted by film critics and insiders to be an in-competition entry at the upcoming 2018 Cannes Film Festival. Lee's 2007 film Secret Sunshine and his 2010 film Poetry both premiered as in-competition entries at the Cannes Film Festival. In April 2018, Burning was among the lineup of in-competition entries announced for the 2018 Cannes Film Festival.

Burning was sold to more than 100 countries and territories at the Marché du Film in Cannes Film Festival. This included Hong Kong, China, Taiwan, Singapore, the United Kingdom, Japan, Australia, New Zealand, Spain, Greece, Poland and Turkey. In South Korea, Burning premiered in theaters on May 17, 2018. It was released in the United States on October 26, 2018. Film rights were acquired by Energia Entusiasta for Latin America. On April 29, 2019, Netflix released Burning on its streaming service.

It was screened at the 28th Busan International Film Festival as part of 'Korean American Special Exhibition: Korean Diaspora' on 6 October 2023. In 2025, the film was showcased in the section 'Decisive Moments in Asian Cinema' at the 30th Busan International Film Festival, as part of the special "Asian Cinema 100", being the signature work of the director Lee Chang-dong.

=== Home media ===
Distributor Well Go USA Entertainment released Burning on Blu-ray and DVD on March 5, 2019.

== Reception ==
=== Box office ===
Burning grossed $719,772 in the United States and Canada, and $6.1 million in other territories (including $4.2 million in South Korea), for a total worldwide gross of $6.8 million.

On its opening day in South Korea, Burning attracted 52,324 viewers in total, ranking second at the box office behind Deadpool 2 (248,904 viewers). Over the first weekend of its release, Burning received 220,717 admissions, placing third at the local box office. By the end of its run, the film recorded 528,168 admissions in its home country.

In its opening weekend in France, the film attracted 53,876 audience in total, ranking third at the box office behind Mile 22, while in its opening weekend in the United States, the film made $26,130 from two theaters. The film had its widest release in its third weekend, playing in 27 theaters and grossing $76,608.

=== Critical response ===
On review aggregator Rotten Tomatoes, the film holds an approval rating of 95% from 197 reviews, with an average rating of 8.6/10. The website's critical consensus reads, "Burning patiently lures audiences into a slow-burning character study that ultimately rewards the viewer's patience – and subverts many of their expectations." On Metacritic, the film has a weighted average score of 91 out of 100, based on 38 critics, indicating "universal acclaim".

Los Angeles Times's Justin Chang called it "a masterpiece of psychological unease – the most lucid and absorbing new movie I've seen this year, as well as the most layered and enigmatic". The Guardian's Peter Bradshaw called it "a gripping nightmare" and lavished praise on how "Lee creates a sense of mood and place with masterly flair." Sight & Sound rated it the third best film of 2018, and Jessica Kiang wrote in her Cannes review, "The embers are banked up so gradually that it's not until a few hours after the ending of this elusive, riveting masterpiece that you are far enough away to appreciate the scale of the conflagration." Tim Robey in The Daily Telegraph observed, "This is Lee's closest ever film to a thriller, but it defies expectations, offering multiple, murky solutions to a set of mysteries at once." Vulture's Emily Yoshida praised the film for its "perception of the rich vampirizing youth – not directly biologically or physically or financially, but emotionally" but considered that "Burning lost its steam in its second half". Peter Debruge of Variety suggested that "[t]he degree to which Burning succeeds will depend largely on one's capacity to identify with the unspoken but strongly conveyed sense of jealousy and frustration its lower-class protagonist feels". Rolling Stone's Peter Travers wrote that the film "sizzles with a cumulative power that will knock the wind out of you" and declared that "Lee has crafted a hypnotic and haunting film that transcends genre to dig deep into the human condition. You won't be able to get it out of your head."

Geoff Andrew of Time Out was similarly positive, hailing it as a "movie rich in teasing ambiguities and possible lies... Lee's interest lies not in crime-solving but in exploring Jongsu's emotional confusion... Both a slow-burn suspense drama and an intriguing enigma, his film is beautifully executed". Todd McCarthy of The Hollywood Reporter reacted enthusiastically to the film, writing that "[t]his is a beautifully crafted film loaded with glancing insights and observations into an understated triangular relationship, one rife with subtle perceptions about class privilege, reverberating family legacies, creative confidence, self-invention, sexual jealousy, justice and revenge". For The Canadian Press, David Friend said the film includes "simmering layers of subtext and tension build over the film's two-and-a-half hour runtime".

Nick Pinkerton, writing in Artforum, was more muted, writing that "Burning is strewn with all sorts of information whose exact meaning and validity is impossible to determine... a film with such a diffident, often passive protagonist must generate its tensions and attractions elsewhere – memorable supporting players, a tactile atmosphere, a complex sense of the social sphere, an emphatic emotionalism". Writing in the Korea Times, David Tizzard argued that Ben may function not as an autonomous character but as Jeong-su’s projected double—a "Fight Club–style" manifestation of his fantasies, resentments, and dissociated self. This reading suggests that Ben and Jeong-su form a single psychological entity, with their mirrored actions, shared habits, and overlapping memories implying two figures occupying one fractured consciousness.

The depiction of the female character Hae-mi in the film attracted some criticism. However, Adam Nayman from Film Society of Lincoln Center argued and emphasized for The Ringer that the story is "told fully from Jongsu's point of view", so "it's fair to ask whether Lee Chang Dong is cultivating true audience solidarity or urging us to understand the story exclusively through the lens of his hero's prejudices: to see Haemi and Ben as idealized and demonized figures, respectively." Phoebe Chen of the Film Feminist Journal: Another Gaze, analyzed that Haemi's existence had a grander purpose in the film, and wrote, "If you know Burning is adapted from a Haruki Murakami short story, however loosely, you know that Haemi will vanish. The trope of the missing woman is built into Murakami's narrative DNA: her vanishing will preoccupy the protagonist, neurotically at first, then fade over the months and years to a dull malaise", and "The mystery of Haemi's disappearance is technically 'solved', but becomes supplanted by one grander: the mystery of a world that tantalises with the hope of futurity while locking its millions of subjects in a cold impasse." Alexandra Heller-Nicholas of Alliance of Women Film Journalists wrote that the character of Hae-mi is much more than simply a missing woman as a plot device, but one of the most powerful parts of a film that casually yet firmly addresses the pressures on women.

=== Accolades ===
Burning won the FIPRESCI Prize at the 2018 Cannes Film Festival. It became the highest-rated film in the history of Screen International's Cannes jury grid. Burning also won Best Foreign Language Film in the Los Angeles Film Critics Association, Best Foreign Language Film in the Toronto Film Critics Association and the National Board of Review's Top Five Foreign Language Film. It went on to be nominated for three Asia Pacific Screen Awards, winning the Jury Grand Prize. It was included on RogerEbert.com's Ten Best Films of 2018. It was nominated for eight Asian Film Awards, including Best Film, and won the Best Director award. In September 2019, it won the Saturn Award for Best International Film.

Burning was selected as the South Korean entry for the Best Foreign Language Film category at the 91st Academy Awards; although it was not nominated, it became the first Korean film to make it to the final nine-film shortlist.

==== Top ten lists ====
Burning appeared on many critics' year-end top ten lists for 2018, among them:

- 1st – The A.V. Club
- 1st – Justin Chang, Los Angeles Times
- 1st – Jake Coyle, Associated Press
- 1st – John Powers, Vogue
- 2nd – Manohla Dargis, The New York Times
- 2nd – Film Comment
- 4th – Marlow Stern, The Daily Beast
- 5th – Barry Hertz, The Globe and Mail
- 6th – David Ehrlich, IndieWire

Not ranked

- Joe Morgenstern, The Wall Street Journal
- Ty Burr, The Boston Globe

==== Decade-end lists ====
In late 2019, Burning also appeared on the "Best films of the decade" lists of Rolling Stone, The A.V. Club, Associated Press, The Boston Globe, Indiewire, Insider, and Film Comment.

In July 2025, it was one of the films voted for the "Readers' Choice" edition of The New York Times' list of "The 100 Best Movies of the 21st Century," finishing at number 148. That same month, it ranked number 40 on Rolling Stone's list of "The 100 Best Movies of the 21st Century."

== See also ==
- List of submissions to the 91st Academy Awards for Best Foreign Language Film
- List of South Korean submissions for the Academy Award for Best Foreign Language Film
