= Los Angeles Film Critics Association Award for Best Foreign Language Film =

Annual US film award

- Country: United States
- Presented by: Los Angeles Film Critics Association
- First award: Claude Lelouch; And Now My Love (1975)
- Currently held by: Kleber Mendonça Filho; The Secret Agent (2025)
- Website: lafca.net

The Los Angeles Film Critics Association Award for Best Foreign Language Film is an award given annually by the Los Angeles Film Critics Association. It was first introduced in 1975 to reward an outstanding film not in the English language.

== Winners ==
=== 1970s ===
| Year | English title | Original title | Country | Director |
|---|---|---|---|---|
Best Foreign Film
| 1975 | And Now My Love | Toute une vie | France / Italy | Claude Lelouch |
| 1976 | Face to Face | Ansikte mot ansikte | Sweden | Ingmar Bergman |
| 1977 | That Obscure Object of Desire | Cet obscur objet du désir | France / Spain | Luis Buñuel |
| 1978 | Madame Rosa | La vie devant soi | France | Moshé Mizrahi |
| 1979 | Soldier of Orange | Soldaat van Oranje | Netherlands | Paul Verhoeven |

=== 1980s ===
| Year | English title | Original title | Country | Director |
|---|---|---|---|---|
| 1981 | The Tin Drum | Die Blechtrommel | West Germany | Volker Schlöndorff |
| 1982 | Pixote | Pixote: A lei do mais fraco | Brazil | Hector Babenco |
| 1983 | Mad Max 2: The Road Warrior | | Australia | George Miller |
| 1984 | Fanny and Alexander | Fanny och Alexander | Sweden | Ingmar Bergman |
| 1984 | The Fourth Man | De vierde man | Netherlands | Paul Verhoeven |
| 1985 | Ran | | Japan / France | Akira Kurosawa |
| 1985 | The Official Story | La historia oficial | Argentina | Luis Puenzo |
| 1986 | Vagabond | Sans toit ni loi | France / UK | Agnès Varda |
| 1987 | Goodbye, Children | Au revoir les enfants | France / West Germany | Louis Malle |
| 1988 | Wings of Desire | Der Himmel über Berlin | France / West Germany | Wim Wenders |
| 1989 | Distant Voices, Still Lives | | UK | Terence Davies |
| 1989 | Story of Women | Une affaire de femmes | France | Claude Chabrol |

=== 1990s ===
| Year | English title | Original title | Country | Director |
|---|---|---|---|---|
| 1990 | Life and Nothing But | La vie et rien d'autre | France | Bertrand Tavernier |
| 1991 | The Beautiful Troublemaker | La belle noiseuse | France / Switzerland | Jacques Rivette |
| 1992 | The Crying Game | | UK / Japan | Neil Jordan |
| 1993 | Farewell My Concubine | Ba wang bie ji | China / Hong Kong | Chen Kaige |
| 1994 | Three Colours: Red | Trois couleurs: Rouge | France / Poland | Krzysztof Kieślowski |
Best Foreign Language Film
| 1995 | Wild Reeds | Les roseaux sauvages | France | André Téchiné |
| 1996 | La Cérémonie | La cérémonie | France | Claude Chabrol |
| 1997 | The Promise | La promesse | Belgium | Jean-Pierre and Luc Dardenne |
| 1998 | The Celebration | Festen | Denmark | Thomas Vinterberg |
| 1999 | All About My Mother | Todo sobre mi madre | Spain | Pedro Almodóvar |

=== 2000s ===
| Year | English title | Original title | Country | Director |
|---|---|---|---|---|
| 2000 | Yi Yi | Yī Yī | Japan / Taiwan | Edward Yang |
| 2001 | No Man's Land | | Bosnia-Herzegovina | Danis Tanovic |
| 2002 | And Your Mother Too | Y Tu Mamá También | Mexico | Alfonso Cuarón |
| 2003 | The Man on the Train | L'homme du train | France | Patrice Leconte |
| 2004 | House of Flying Daggers | Shi mian mai fu | China / Hong Kong | Zhang Yimou |
| 2005 | Hidden | Caché | Austria / France | Michael Haneke |
| 2006 | The Lives of Others | Das Leben der Anderen | Germany | Florian Henckel von Donnersmarck |
| 2007 | 4 Months, 3 Weeks and 2 Days | 4 luni, 3 săptămâni şi 2 zile | Romania | Cristian Mungiu |
| 2008 | Still Life | Sanxia haoren | China / Hong Kong | Jia Zhangke |
| 2009 | Summer Hours | L'Heure d'été | France | Olivier Assayas |

=== 2010s ===
| Year | English title | Original title | Country | Director |
|---|---|---|---|---|
| 2010 | Carlos | | France / Germany | Olivier Assayas |
| 2011 | City of Life and Death | Nanjing! Nanjing! | China | Lu Chuan |
| 2012 | Holy Motors | | France | Leos Carax |
| 2013 | Blue Is the Warmest Colour | La vie d'Adèle | France | Abdellatif Kechiche |
| 2014 | Ida | | Poland | Paweł Pawlikowski |
| 2015 | Son of Saul | Saul fia | Hungary | László Nemes |
| 2016 | The Handmaiden | Agassi | South Korea | Park Chan-wook |
| 2017 | BPM (Beats per Minute) | 120 battements par minute | France | Robin Campillo |
| 2017 | Loveless | Нелюбовь | Russia | Andrey Zvyagintsev |
| 2018 | Burning | Beoning | South Korea | Lee Chang-dong |
| 2018 | Shoplifters | 万引き家族 / Manbiki Kazoku | Japan | Hirokazu Kore-eda |
| 2019 | Pain and Glory | Dolor y Gloria | Spain | Pedro Almodóvar |

=== 2020s ===
| Year | English title | Original title | Country | Director |
|---|---|---|---|---|
| 2020 | Beanpole | Dylda | Russia | Kantemir Balagov |
| 2021 | Petite Maman | | France | Céline Sciamma |
| 2022 | EO | Io | Poland | Jerzy Skolimowski |
| 2023 | Anatomy of a Fall | Anatomie d'une chute | France | Justine Triet |
| 2024 | All We Imagine as Light | | India | Payal Kapadia |
| 2025 | The Secret Agent | O Agente Secreto | Brazil | Kleber Mendonça Filho |

== Multiple winners ==
5 director has won the award multiple times.

| Wins | Director |
|---|---|
| 2 | (Spain) Pedro Almodóvar |
| 2 | (France) Olivier Assayas |
| 2 | (Sweden) Ingmar Bergman |
| 2 | (France) Claude Chabrol |
| 2 | (Netherlands) Paul Verhoeven |
