= 13th Asian Film Awards =

2019 edition of award ceremony

- Date: March 17, 2019
- Site: TVB City, Hong Kong

Highlights
- Best Film: Shoplifters
- Most awards: Shadow (4)
- Most nominations: Burning (8)

The 13th Asian Film Awards are the 2019 edition of the Asian Film Awards. The ceremony was held on March 17, 2019, at the TVB City in Hong Kong.

== Winners and nominees ==
Winners are listed first and highlighted in bold.

Best Film	Best Director
**Shoplifters** (Japan); Burning (South Korea); Dying to Survive (China); Jinpa (China); Sanju (India)	**Lee Chang-dong – Burning** (South Korea); Pema Tseden – Jinpa (China); Rajkumar Hirani – Sanju (India); Hirokazu Kore-eda – Shoplifters (Japan); Fruit Chan – Three Husbands (Hong Kong)
Best Actor	Best Actress
**Kōji Yakusho – The Blood of Wolves** (Japan); Yoo Ah-in – Burning (South Korea); Xu Zheng – Dying to Survive (China); Aaron Kwok – Project Gutenberg (Hong Kong) (China); Ranbir Kapoor – Sanju (India)	**Samal Yeslyamova – Ayka** (Russia) (Kazakhstan); Zhao Tao – Ash Is Purest White (China); Han Ji-min – Miss Baek (South Korea); Sakura Ando – Shoplifters (Japan); Chloe Maayan – Three Husbands (Hong Kong)
Best Supporting Actor	Best Supporting Actress
**ZHANG Yu – Dying to Survive** (China); Kwon Hae-hyo – Hotel by the River (South Korea); Shinya Tsukamoto – Killing (Japan); Vicky Kaushal – Sanju (India); River Huang – Tracey (Hong Kong)	**Kara Hui – Tracey** (Hong Kong); Jin Seo-yeon – Believer (South Korea); Ding Ning – Cities of Last Things (Taiwan); Xu Qing – Hidden Man (China); Mayu Matsuoka – Shoplifters (Japan)
Best New Director	Best Newcomer
**Oliver Chan – Still Human** (Hong Kong); Yeo Siew Hua – A Land Imagined (Singapore) (France) (Netherlands); Rima Das – Bulbul Can Sing (India); Phuttiphong Aroonpheng – Manta Ray (Thailand) (France) (China); Shinichirou Ueda – One Cut of the Dead (Japan); Bai Xue – The Crossing (China)	**Huang Jingyu – Operation Red Sea** (China) (Hong Kong); Erika Karata – Asako I & II (Japan); Jeon Jong-seo – Burning (South Korea); Zhang Ying Xie – Cities of Last Things (Taiwan); HUANG Yao – The Crossing (China); Peter Chan – Three Husbands (Hong Kong)
Best Screenplay	Best Editing
**Jia Zhangke – Ash Is Purest White** (China); Oh Jung-mi, Lee Chang-dong – Burning (South Korea); Han Jianü, Zhong Wei, Wen Muye – Dying to Survive (China); Felix Chong – Project Gutenberg (Hong Kong) (China); Rajkumar Hirani, Abhijat Joshi – Sanju (India)	**Shinya Tsukamoto – Killing** (Japan); Choi Chi Hung, Lam Chi Hang – Operation Red Sea (China) (Hong Kong); Curran Pang – Project Gutenberg (Hong Kong) (China); Zhou Xiaolin – Shadow (China); Kim Sang-bum, Kim Jae-bum – The Spy Gone North (South Korea)
Best Cinematography	Best Original Music
**Zhao Xiaoding – Shadow** (China); Hong Kyung-pyo – Burning (South Korea); Songye Lu – Jinpa (China); Nawarophaat Rungphiboonsophit – Manta Ray (Thailand) (France) (China); Pankaj Kumar – Tumbbad (India)	**Haruomi Hosono – Shoplifters** (Japan); Dalpalan – Believer (South Korea); Lim Giong, Point Hsu – Jinpa (China); A. R. Rahman, Atul Raninga, Sanjay Wandrekar – Sanju (India); Loudboy – Shadow (China)
Best Costume Designer	Best Production Design
**Chen Minzheng – Shadow** (China); Dong Zhongmin, Uma Wang, Shuping Zhang – Hidden Man (China); Lim Chung Man – Project Gutenberg (Hong Kong) (China); Kazuhiro Sawataishi – Punk Samurai Slash Down (Japan); Chae Kyung-hwa – The Spy Gone North (South Korea)	**Horace Ma – Shadow** (China); Shin Jeom-hee – Burning (South Korea); Liu Qing – Hidden Man (China); Keiko Mitsumatsu – Shoplifters (Japan); Rakesh Yadav, Nitin Zihani Choudhary – Tumbbad (India)
Best Visual Effects	Best Sound
**Alex Lim Hung-Fung – Project Gutenberg** (Hong Kong) (China); Srinivas Mohan – 2.0 (India); Wang Shaoshuai, Yang Yuejuan – Hidden Man (China); Lee In-ho, Kang Tae-gyun – Operation Red Sea (China) (Hong Kong); Katsuro Onoue – Punk Samurai Slash Down (Japan)	**Yang Jiang, Zhao Nan – Shadow** (China); Resul Pookutty, Amrit Pritam – 2.0 (India); Lee Seung-chul – Burning (South Korea); Masaya Kitada – Killing (Japan); Nopawat Likitwong, Sarunyu Nurnsai – Operation Red Sea (China) (Hong Kong)
Lifetime Achievement Award	2018 Highest Grossing Asian Film
**Lee Chang-dong** (South Korea)	**Operation Red Sea** (China) (Hong Kong) (Morocco)
Excellence in Asian Cinema Award	AFA Next Generation Award
**Yakusho Koji** (Japan)	**Kim Jae-joong** (South Korea)
