= Toronto Film Critics Association Award for Best Foreign Language Film =

Annual award given by Toronto Film Critics Association

The Toronto Film Critics Association Award for Best Foreign (Language) Film is one of the annual awards given by the Toronto Film Critics Association.

== Winners ==
=== 2000s ===
Year	Winner	Country	Director(s)	Ref
2003	City of God (Cidade de Deus)	Brazil	Fernando Meirelles	
2004	Hero (Ying xiong)	China/Hong Kong	Zhang Yimou	
2005	The World (Shijie)	China	Jia Zhangke	
2006	L'Enfant	Belgium	Jean-Pierre and Luc Dardenne	
2006	Pan's Labyrinth (El laberinto del fauno)	Mexico	Guillermo del Toro	
2006	Volver	Spain	Pedro Almodóvar	
2007	4 Months, 3 Weeks and 2 Days (4 luni, 3 saptamani si 2 zile)	Romania	Cristian Mungiu	
2007	The Diving Bell and the Butterfly (Le scaphandre et le papillon)	France/USA	Julian Schnabel	
2007	The Lives of Others (Das Leben der Anderen)	Germany	Florian Henckel von Donnersmarck	
2008	Let the Right One In (Låt den rätte komma in)	Sweden	Tomas Alfredson	
2008	A Christmas Tale (Un conte de Noël)	France	Arnaud Desplechin	
2008	The Class (Entre les murs)	France	Laurent Cantet	
2008	I've Loved You So Long (Il y a longtemps que je t'aime)	France	Philippe Claudel	
2009	The White Ribbon (Das weiße Band, Eine deutsche Kindergeschichte)	Austria/Germany	Michael Haneke	
2009	Police, Adjective (Poliţist, Adjectiv)	Romania	Corneliu Porumboiu	
2009	Summer Hours (L'Heure d'été)	France	Olivier Assayas	

=== 2010s ===
Year	Winner	Country	Director(s)	Ref
2010	Uncle Boonmee Who Can Recall His Past Lives	Thailand	Apichatpong Weerasethakul	
2010	Mother	South Korea	Bong Joon-ho	
2010	Of Gods and Men	France	Xavier Beauvois	
2011	Mysteries of Lisbon	Portugal	Raúl Ruiz	
2011	Attenberg	Greece	Athina Rachel Tsangari	
2011	Le Havre	Finland/France/Germany	Aki Kaurismäki	
2011	A Separation	Iran	Asghar Farhadi	
2012	Amour	Austria / France / Germany	Michael Haneke	
2012	Holy Motors	France / Germany	Leos Carax	
2012	Tabu	Portugal	Miguel Gomes	
2013	A Touch of Sin	China	Jia Zhangke	
2013	Blue Is the Warmest Colour	France	Abdellatif Kechiche	
2013	The Hunt	Denmark	Thomas Vinterberg	
2014	Force Majeure	Sweden	Ruben Östlund	
2014	Ida	Poland / Denmark	Paweł Pawlikowski	
2014	Leviathan	Russia	Andrey Zvyagintsev	
2015	Phoenix	Germany	Christian Petzold	
2015	The Assassin	Taiwan / China / Hong Kong	Hou Hsiao-hsien	
2015	Son of Saul	Hungary	László Nemes	
2016	Toni Erdmann	Germany	Maren Ade	
2016	The Handmaiden	South Korea	Park Chan-Wook	
2016	Elle	France	Paul Verhoeven	
2017	The Square	Sweden	Ruben Östlund	
2017	Faces Places	France	Agnès Varda and JR	
2017	Loveless	Russia	Andrey Zvyagintsev	
2018	Burning	South Korea	Lee Chang-dong	
2018	Cold War	Poland	Paweł Pawlikowski	
2018	Roma	Mexico	Alfonso Cuarón	
2019	Parasite	South Korea	Bong Joon-ho	
2019	Pain and Glory	Spain	Pedro Almodóvar	
2019	Portrait of a Lady on Fire	France	Céline Sciamma	

=== 2020s ===
Year	Winner	Country	Director(s)	Ref
2020	Bacurau	Brazil, France	Kleber Mendonça Filho	
2020	Another Round (Druk)	Denmark	Thomas Vinterberg	
2020	Beanpole	Russia	Kantemir Balagov	
2021	Drive My Car	Japan	Ryusuke Hamaguchi	
2021	Petite Maman	France	Céline Sciamma	
2021	The Worst Person in the World (Verdens verste menneske)	Norway	Joachim Trier	
2022	Saint Omer	France	Alice Diop	
2022	Decision to Leave	South Korea	Park Chan-wook	
2022	EO	Poland / Italy	Jerzy Skolimowski	
2023	Fallen Leaves	Finland	Aki Kaurismäki	
2023	Anatomy of a Fall	France	Justine Triet	
2023	The Zone of Interest	United Kingdom	Jonathan Glazer	
2024	All We Imagine as Light	France, Italy, Luxembourg, Netherlands, India	Payal Kapadia	
2024	Evil Does Not Exist (Aku wa Sonzai Shinai)	Japan	Ryusuke Hamaguchi	
2024	Green Border (Zielona granica)	Poland, Czech Republic, France, Belgium	Agnieszka Holland	
2025	Sirāt	France, Spain	Oliver Laxe	
2025	It Was Just an Accident	France, Iran, Luxembourg	Jafar Panahi	
2025	The Secret Agent	Brazil, France, Germany, Netherlands	Kleber Mendonça Filho	
