= Heinz Insu Fenkl =

American writer and academic (born 1960)

Heinz Insu Fenkl (born 1960) is an author, editor, translator, and folklorist. His autobiographical novels Memories of My Ghost Brother and Skull Water are widely taught at colleges and universities. He is known internationally for his collection of Korean Folktales and is also an expert on Asian American and Korean literature, including North Korean comics and literature.

== Academic work ==
Heinz Insu Fenkl is a Professor of English at SUNY New Paltz, where he currently teaches creative writing in addition to courses on Asian and Asian American literature and film. He was a member of the editorial board for Harvard University's Azalea: Journal of Korean Literature and Culture from its inception until 2017. He previously served as coordinator of the Creative Writing Program and was director of The Interstitial Studies Institute at SUNY New Paltz. He is currently a member of the editorial board for SIJO: an international journal of poetry and song.

He has taught a wide array of creative writing, folklore, literature, and Asian and Asian American studies courses at Vassar College, Eastern Michigan University, and Sarah Lawrence College. He was also a core faculty member for the Milton Avery M.F.A. Program at Bard College and has taught at Yonsei University in Korea.

== Works ==
Books:

Skull Water (Spiegel & Grau, 2023)

Memories of My Ghost Brother (Dutton, 1996: Bo-Leaf Books, 2005)

Korean Folktales (Bo-Leaf Books, 2007)

Cathay: translations and transformations (Codhill Press, 2007)

Korean Myths co-authored with Bella Myong-wol Dalton-Fenkl was published in 2025 by Thames and Hudson.

Edited volumes:

Kori: The Beacon Anthology of Korean American Literature. co-edited with Walter K. Lew (Beacon, 2002)

Century of the Tiger: 100 Years of Korean Culture in America, co-edited with Jenny Ryun Foster and Frank Stewart (University of Hawaii Press, 2002)

Fenkl also edited a special section in Harvard University's Azalea, Volume 2, 2009 on North Korean Literature and coedited a special section in Azalea, Volume 7, 2014 on Korean American Literature.|

Translations:

The Nine Cloud Dream by Kim Man-jung (Penguin Classics, 2019)

Tales from the Temple by Musan Cho Oh-hyun (Codhill Press, 2019)

The Red Years: Forbidden Poems from Inside North Korea by Bandi (Zed Books, 2019)

For Nirvana: 108 Zen Poems by Musan Cho Oh-hyun (Columbia University Press, 2016)

Meeting with My Brother by Yi Mun-yol (Weatherhill Books on Asia, 2017)

A section of Fenkl's translation of the Kim Man-jung's 17th-century Buddhist masterpiece, The Nine Cloud Dream, also appeared in AZALEA, Volume 7, 2014. Fenkl's translation of the novel was published by Penguin Classics in 2019. Publishers Weekly writes that "Man-Jung’s tale is a hypnotic journey, a scholarly, instructive Buddhist bildungsroman set across Tang dynasty China, and in Insu Fenkl’s skilled translation, a glimpse into the rich crossroads of religions and society...".

== Personal ==
Fenkl received his A.B. in English from Vassar College and his M.A. in English/Creative Writing from the University of California, Davis. He was a Fulbright Scholar in South Korea, where he began a project collecting narrative folktales and studied literary translation. He was also co-director of the Fulbright Summer Seminar in Korean History and Culture. Fenkl studied in the Ph.D. Program in Cultural Anthropology at University of California, Davis. His areas of specialization were shamanism, East Asian narrative folklore, and ethnographic theory. Fenkl was raised in Korea and (in his later years) Germany and the United States. He lives in the Hudson Valley with his wife and daughter.
