= APSA Jury Grand Prize =

Special award of the Asia Pacific Screen Awards

The Asia Pacific Screen Award Jury Grand Prize is presented at the discretion of the jury. The winners of this award are

Year	Film	Winners and Nominees	Nationality
2007	The Night Bus (Autobus-E Shab)	Kiomars Pourahmad (director)	Iran
2008	The Red Awn (Hongse Kangbaiyin) The Prisoner	Cai Shangjun (director) Pryas Gupta (director)	China India
2009	About Elly (Darbareye Elly) The Time That Remains	Asghar Farhadi (director) Elia Suleiman (director)	Iran Palestine
2010	Caterpillar Lebanon	Shinobu Terajima (actress) Samuel Maoz (director)	Japan Israel
2011	Once Upon a Time in Anatolia (Bir Zamanlar Anadolu’da)	Zeynep Özbatur Atakan (producer)	Turkey
2012	Gangs of Wasseypur Pieta	Anurag Kashyap (director) Jo Min-su (actress)	India South Korea
2013	Television The Lunchbox	Mostofa Sarwar Farooki (director) Ritesh Batra (director)	Bangladesh India
2014	Blind Massage (Tui Na) Tales	Nai An, Li Ling, Kristina Larsen, Wang Yong (producers) Rakhshān Banietemad (director)	China France Iran
2015	Alive () Frenzy	Park Jung-bum (director) Emin Alper (director)	South Korea Turkey
2016	The Bacchus Lady Crosscurrent (Chang Jiang Tu)	Youn Yuh-jung (actress) Mark Lee Ping-Bing (cinematography)	South Korea Republic of China
2017	Arrhythmia Scary Mother	Aleksandr Yatsenko (actor) Ana Urushadze (director)	Russia Georgia
2018	Burning	Lee Chang-dong (director), Lee Joon-dong (producer)	South Korea
2019		Elia Suleiman (director)	Palestine
2021	The Drover's Wife; Rehana Maryam Noor	Leah Purcell (director) Abdullah Mohammad Saad	Australia; Bangladesh
