= The Elephant Vanishes =

1993 short story collection by Haruki Murakami

- U.S. First edition cover
- Editor: Gary Fisketjon
- Author: Haruki Murakami
- Original title: 象の消滅; Zō no shōmetsu
- Translator: Alfred Birnbaum, Jay Rubin
- Language: Japanese
- Genre: Short story collection
- Published: March 31, 1993 (Knopf)
- Publication place: Japan
- Media type: Print (hardcover)
- Pages: 327
- ISBN: 0-679-42057-6
- OCLC: 26805691
- LC Class: PL856.U673 E44 1993

The Elephant Vanishes (象の消滅, Zō no shōmetsu) is a collection of 17 short stories by Japanese author Haruki Murakami. The stories were written between 1980 and 1991, and published in Japan in various magazines, then collections. The contents of this compilation were selected by Gary Fisketjon (Murakami's editor at Knopf) and first published in an English translation in 1993 (its Japanese counterpart was released later in 2005). Several of the stories had already appeared (often with alternate translations) in the magazines The New Yorker, Playboy, and The Magazine (Mobil Corp.) before this compilation was published.

Stylistically and thematically, the collection aligns with Murakami's previous work. The stories mesh normality with surrealism, and focus on painful issues involving loss, destruction, confusion and loneliness. The title for the book is derived from the final story in the collection.

== Synopsis ==
=== "The Wind-up Bird and Tuesday's Women" ===
Note: This story was subsequently updated as the first chapter of The Wind-Up Bird Chronicle.

After being disturbed by a strange phone-call from an unknown woman demanding ten minutes of his time, a man goes in search of his wife's missing cat and meets a girl in a neighbor's garden.

=== "The Second Bakery Attack" ===
A recently married couple in their late twenties lie in bed, famished; they have little in their refrigerator: a six-pack of beer and some cookies. After drinking and eating all of it, the man recounts to his wife a time he and his friend “robbed” a bakery ten years ago. The two intended to take all the bread they could from a bakery by force. The man who ran the bakery offers a counterproposal before the two men can act: since he is a Richard Wagner fanatic, if they listen to Tannhäuser and The Flying Dutchman with him in the bakery, he will give them all the bread they can carry. They agree, and the bread is enough to feed the two men for a few days. After hearing of that story, the woman suggests that they do the same thing, despite it being 2:30 A.M.

They drive around Tokyo looking for a bakery but all of them are closed; they “compromise” to “rob” a McDonald's instead. With ski-masks and a Remington automatic shotgun, they enter the restaurant and demand thirty Big Macs. The three employees working there fulfill the peculiar request. The couple then leave the restaurant and drive until they find an empty parking lot; they then eat four to six Big Macs each until they are full. The man feels calm after this experience.

=== "The Kangaroo Communiqué" ===
A man working in the product-control section of a department store received a letter from a woman who wrote to complain that she had mistakenly bought Mahler instead of Brahms. The man is captivated by the woman's letter of complaint and so decides to make personal contact with her after seeing Kangaroos at a zoo; he decides to call this letter to her "The Kangaroo Communiqué."

=== "On Seeing the 100% Perfect Girl One Beautiful April Morning" ===
A Tokyo man tells of passing the "100% perfect girl" for him in a Harajuku neighborhood. He imagines a scenario where an eighteen-year-old boy and a sixteen-year-old girl meet and agree that they are 100% perfect for each other. To prove their hypothesis, they agree to go their separate ways and let fate bring them back together. Years go by and one winter, they both get terrible influenza which causes them to forget much of their respective young adult years. They run into each other in Harajuku when he is thirty-two and she is thirty, but they do not stop for each other. The man says that this is what he should have said to the "100% perfect girl."

=== "Sleep" ===
A woman has not slept for 17 days but does not feel the need for sleep. She conceals her condition from her husband and children but spends the nights eating chocolate, drinking Rémy Martin brandy, reading Anna Karenina and going for drives through the city in her Civic. Ultimately, her insomnia takes her to a nearly deserted parking lot, where danger awaits.

=== "The Fall of the Roman Empire, the 1881 Indian Uprising, Hitler's Invasion of Poland, and the Realm of Raging Winds" ===
A man writes his diary, prompted by unique phrases to remind him of the day's events.

=== "Lederhosen" ===
A woman tells of her mother's divorce, prompted by a trip to buy some lederhosen in Germany as a souvenir for her husband who has remained at home in Tokyo. The shop refuses to sell her any as her husband is not there to be fitted, so she finds a stranger of the same size.

=== "Barn Burning" ===
A 31-year-old married man and a 20-year-old woman begin a casual and unclear relationship. The woman, an amateur mime, decides to leave Japan for Algiers. Three months later, she returns with a Japanese boyfriend. One day, the woman and her boyfriend ask if they can visit the man's home; because his wife is away visiting relatives, he agrees to the gathering. The three drink carelessly and smoke marijuana in the man's living room; the woman needs to be helped to bed after smoking one joint.

Back in the living room, the boyfriend tells him about his idiosyncratic need to burn a barn about every two months. Interested, the man asks why and how he does this. The boyfriend replies that he feels morally obligated to do so and that he picks the barns that he will burn based on their condition. After the woman wakes up, she and the boyfriend leave the man's place, leaving the man very curious about barn burning. He plans his next few days around scouting possible barns nearby that the boyfriend might burn. He narrows it down to five barns, and passes by all of them on his morning run for a month, but there are no signs of arson.

The man sees the boyfriend again during Christmas and they share coffee. He asks if the boyfriend has burned a barn recently; he says he did about ten days after he visited the man's house. Before leaving, the boyfriend asks if the man has seen the woman lately; he says no, and the boyfriend says that he has not either, and she does not answer her phone or door. The man checks her apartment and sees that her mailbox is filled with fliers. When he checks again later, he sees a new name on the door and realizes that she has disappeared. Continuing his daily routine, he sometimes thinks about barns burning.

This story was the basis for the 2018 South Korean psychological thriller film, Burning.

=== "The Little Green Monster" ===
A monster burrows up into a woman's garden, breaks into her house, and proposes love. The creature can read her mind and she uses this fact to fight against it. Because of her adamant rejection of the monster, it eventually dies, reduced to nothing more than a shadow.

=== "Family Affair" ===
A bachelor and his younger sister live together in a Tokyo apartment. During a trip to Fisherman's Wharf in San Francisco, the sister meets a man named Noboru Watanabe who later becomes her fiancé; the man disapproves of her choice. The sister retorts by saying that she thinks her brother tries to make a joke out of everything.

When the sister invites Noboru over for dinner at the apartment, the men get a chance to interact with each other talking about plans after the wedding. The bachelor then leaves to go out for a drink. He meets a woman at a bar; they talk about baseball and proceed to have sex at her apartment after a few more drinks. When he returns home, he and his sister have a talk about their sex lives, where they learn the number of partners they each slept with; the bachelor says twenty-six while the sister says two before she met Noboru. After, they proceed to their separate rooms for the night.

=== "A Window'" ===
A graduate spends a year working at "The Pen Society" where he is employed to reply to letters from members, grading and making constructive comments on their prose. When he leaves he makes personal contact with one of his correspondents, a childless, married woman. They spend an evening at her place eating dinner and discussing their interests, particularly regarding arts and letters, before he leaves. When he passes by her neighborhood ten years later, he thinks fondly of that afternoon he spent with her.

=== "TV People" ===
20–30% smaller than normal people, the TV people install a television in the narrator's flat, but the change is ignored by his wife. He later spots them carrying a television through his workplace, but when he mentions it to his colleagues they change the subject. Then his wife disappears, but he meets TV People again.

=== "A Slow Boat to China" ===
A Tokyo man recounts his contacts with Chinese people.

In 1959 or 1960 when the man was still in secondary school, he goes to a "Chinese elementary school" to take a standardized aptitude test. He remembers having to traverse up a hill to the classroom. When the proctor arrives he gives clear test-taking directions before announcing that he is Chinese and teaches at the school. He then asks the forty test-takers to respect the desks by not vandalizing them. Everyone but the narrator responds "yes" and the proctor tells them to be proud.

As a nineteen-year-old college student in Tokyo, he meets a similar-aged Chinese woman during a part-time job at a publisher's warehouse; being born in Japan, she has little ties to her ethnic background. After their final day on the job, they agree to have dinner together and go to the discotheque. After their night of leisure, he mistakenly directs her onto the wrong train. Noticing his mistake, he takes the next train to the last station to reunite with her. After admitting his mistake and the woman confessing her insecurities, he says that he will call her tomorrow before she takes the next train back home. The following morning, he realizes that he threw away the matchbook on which her phone number was written. Despite that gaffe, he tries multiple alternatives to obtaining her number but is unsuccessful; he never sees her again.

As a 28-year-old businessman, the man runs into a Chinese classmate from high school in Aoyama. Although they talk for a while in a coffee shop, the man is unable to recall who his colleague is until the line "a lot of water has gone under the bridge" is uttered, a memorable line from their English textbook from high school. The colleague then tells him about how he sells encyclopedias to Chinese families in Tokyo. Wanting for information about the infobooks, he gives his business card to the colleague before they go their separate ways.

The story ends with the narrator reminiscing on his idiosyncratic relationship with Chinese people.

=== "The Dancing Dwarf" ===
A man working at a factory manufacturing elephants dreams of a dancing dwarf, then hears the dwarf existed and danced for the king prior to the revolution. In a subsequent dream he makes a pact with the dwarf to win the heart of a beautiful girl at the factory dance.

=== "The Last Lawn of the Afternoon" ===
Proud of his work, a man decides to give up his job mowing lawns as having split up from his girlfriend he no longer needs the money. He tells of his last assignment near Yomiuri Land.(1987)

=== "The Silence" ===
While waiting for a flight to Niigata, an unnamed narrator asks his friend Ozawa, an amateur boxer, if the pugilist has ever punched another person over an argument; Ozawa responds by saying that he did once, during a middle school feud with classmate Aoki.

Aoki was a model student who always got the top scores on tests. However, during one English test in middle school, Ozawa bested Aoki's score; Ozawa confesses that his parents promising him to buy an exclusive item motivated him to study harder than ever before. When Aoki learns of his "failure," he spreads the rumor that Ozawa cheated on the test. When Ozawa confronted Aoki about the incident, Aoki showed much contempt and Ozawa retaliated by punching him in the jaw; the two do not talk for years even when they are in high school.

During the final year of high school, Matsumoto, a classmate of both boys, committed suicide by jumping in front of a train. When the police investigated the tragedy, they learned that he was bullied by classmates, but are not sure of who gave him the bruises. They suspected Ozawa because of his boxing background and because he had hit another student in the past; Ozawa concluded that Aoki spread that rumor about him, still feeling sore about their run-in during middle school. Ozawa, despite being cleared of any wrongdoing, was still ignored by his classmates; they maintained a complete silence towards him for the rest of high school. Once, he stared down Aoki while enduring the silence until the end of the school year.

Ozawa tells the narrator that he has an idiosyncratic admiration for people like Aoki who cunningly seize opportunity. Ozawa then expresses disappointment in humanity that so many are willing to believe lies and follow without question people like Aoki. The two men decide to get a beer as they continue to wait for their flight.

=== "The Elephant Vanishes" ===
An elderly elephant and its keeper disappear without a trace, the narrator being the last to see them.

== Contents ==
Contents are:

English Title (Japanese Title)	Year of Japanese publication	Elephant Vanishes translator	First published in English in	Year of first English publication
"The Wind-up Bird and Tuesday's Women" ("Nejimaki-dori to kayōbi no onna-tachi")	1986	Alfred Birnbaum	The New Yorker	1990
"The Second Bakery Attack" ("Pan'ya saishūgeki")	1985	Jay Rubin	Marie Claire Japan, Playboy	1992
"The Kangaroo Communiqué" ("Kangarū tsūshin")	1981	Alfred Birnbaum	Zyzzyva (translated by J. Philip Gabriel)	1988
"On Seeing the 100% Perfect Girl One Beautiful April Morning" ("Shigatsu no aru hareta asa ni 100 pāsento no onna no ko ni deau koto ni tsuite")	1981	Jay Rubin	The Elephant Vanishes	1993
"Sleep" ("Nemuri")	1989	Jay Rubin	The New Yorker	1992
"The Fall of the Roman Empire, the 1881 Indian Uprising, Hitler's Invasion of Poland, and the Realm of Raging Winds" ("Rōma teikoku no hōkai, 1881-nen no Indian hōki, Hittorā no Pōrando shinnyū, soshite kyōfū sekai")	1986	Alfred Birnbaum	The Magazine (Mobil Corp.)	
"Lederhosen" ("Rēdāhōzen")	1985	Alfred Birnbaum	Granta	1993
"Barn Burning" ("Naya o yaku")	1983	Alfred Birnbaum	The New Yorker (translated by J. Philip Gabriel)	1992
"The Little Green Monster" ("Midori-iro no kedamono")	1981	Jay Rubin	The Elephant Vanishes	1993
"Family Affair" ("Famirii-afea")	1985	Jay Rubin	The Elephant Vanishes	1993
"A Window" ("Mado")	1991	Jay Rubin	The Elephant Vanishes	1993
"TV People" ("TV Piipuru")	1989	Alfred Birnbaum	The New Yorker	1990
"A Slow Boat to China" ("Chūgoku-yuki no surō bōto")	1980	Alfred Birnbaum	The Threepenny Review	1993
"The Dancing Dwarf" ("Odoru kobito")	1984	Jay Rubin	The Elephant Vanishes	1993
"The Last Lawn of the Afternoon" ("Gogo no saigo no shibafu")	1982	Alfred Birnbaum	The Elephant Vanishes	1993
"The Silence" ("Chinmoku")	1991	Alfred Birnbaum	The Elephant Vanishes	1993
"The Elephant Vanishes" ("Zō no shōmetsu")	1985	Jay Rubin	The New Yorker	1991

== Additional publication ==
While the list above details which stories appeared before the publication of The Elephant Vanishes, many of the stories have also appeared elsewhere more recently:

- "On Seeing the 100% Perfect Girl One Beautiful April Morning" was read on the Public Radio International show This American Life.
- "The Little Green Monster" was read on the Public Radio International show Selected Shorts.

== Theatrical adaptation ==
The British theatre company Complicité collaborated with Japan's Setagaya Public Theatre to produce a stage adaptation also entitled The Elephant Vanishes. The production featured three of the stories in Murakami's collection ("Sleep," "The Second Bakery Attack," and the title story). Directed by Simon McBurney and starring a Japanese cast, the play opened in May, 2003, in Tokyo before touring internationally in limited festival runs. The performance was in Japanese with English supertitles.

The show incorporated a great deal of multimedia, which Complicité had traditionally eschewed, but married it with the company's trademark communal storytelling and demanding physical performance style. The eponymous elephant, for example, was represented at one time by a magnified eye on a video screen, and at another time by four live actors bent over office chairs. This combination of technical wizardry and compelling human narrative received high praise from critics, who also cited the play's humor, realism, and dreamlike motion, a fitting tribute to Murakami's prose.

== Popular culture ==
- The short story "The Elephant Vanishes" inspired a research paper on Asian elephants and their impact on the well-being of the rural poor in India.
- "The Second Bakery Attack" was used as a scene in The Polar Bear, a German movie starring Til Schweiger, written and co-directed by Granz Henman.
- "The Second Bakery Attack" also became a basis for an episode of the South Korean film trilogy Acoustic.
- "Barn Burning" was adapted into the 2018 film Burning by South Korean filmmaker Lee Chang-dong, which premiered to great acclaim at the Cannes film festival of that same year.
- "The Wind-up Bird and Tuesday's Women" was adapted into a short film in 2004 by Israeli filmmakers Oded Binnun and Mihal Brezis, which premiered at several international film festivals as well as had a theatrical release in Israel.
