= 2018 Los Angeles Film Critics Association Awards =

Annual US film awards ceremony

44th LAFCA Awards
- Date: December 9, 2018

Highlights
- Best Picture: Roma

The 44th Los Angeles Film Critics Association Awards, given by the Los Angeles Film Critics Association (LAFCA), honored the best in film for 2018.

== Winners ==
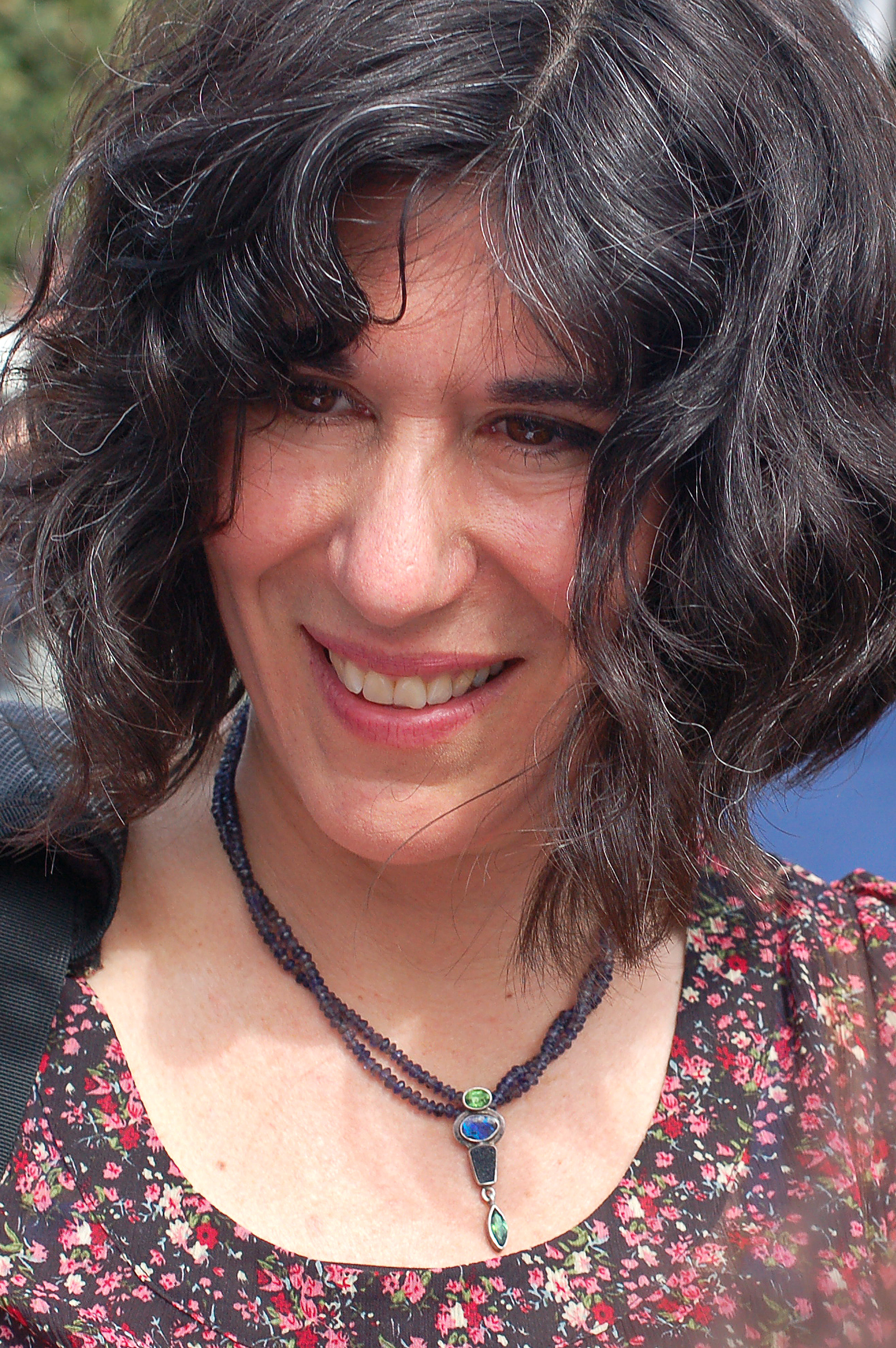
Debra Granik, Best Director winner

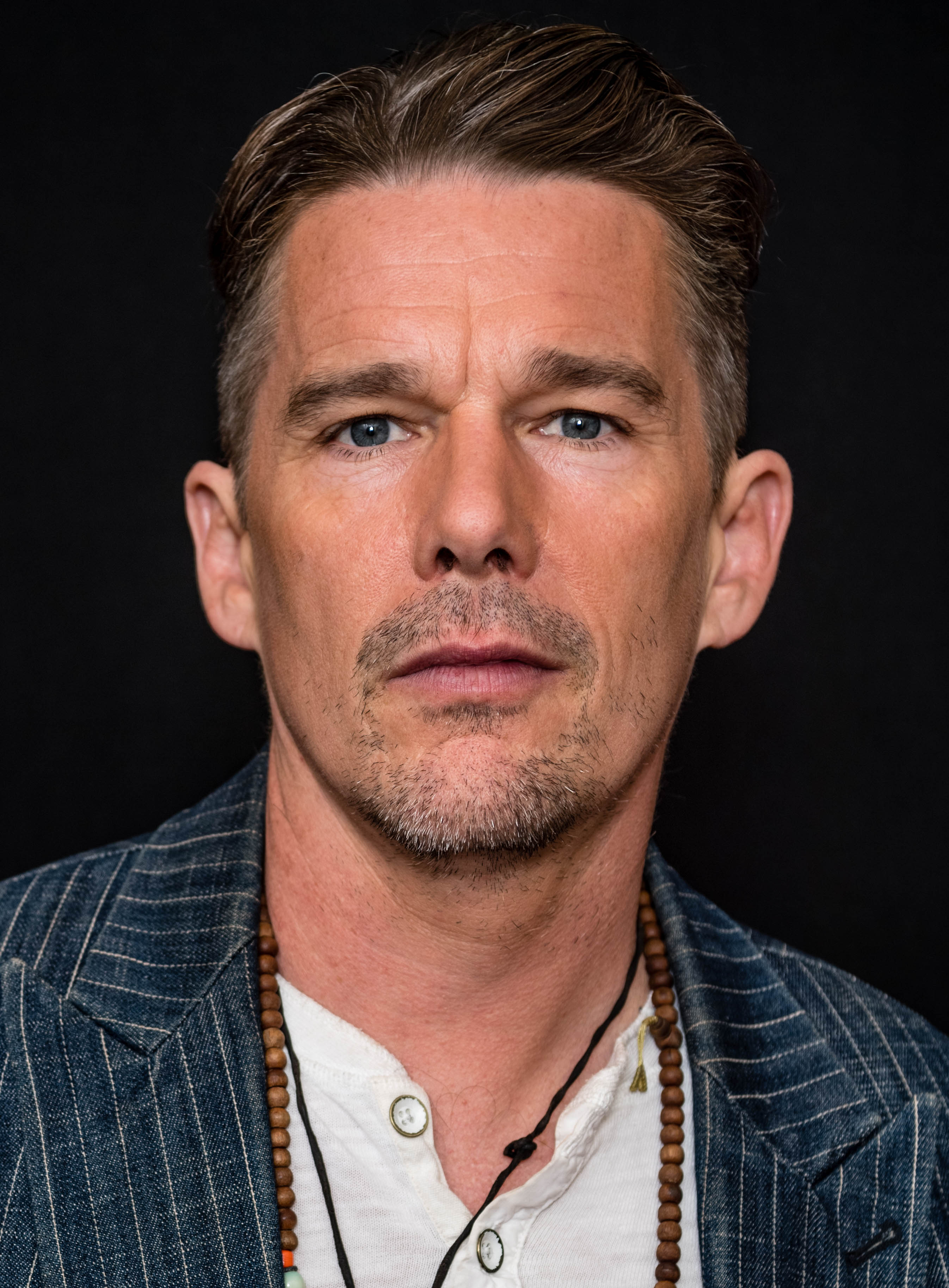
Ethan Hawke, Best Actor winner

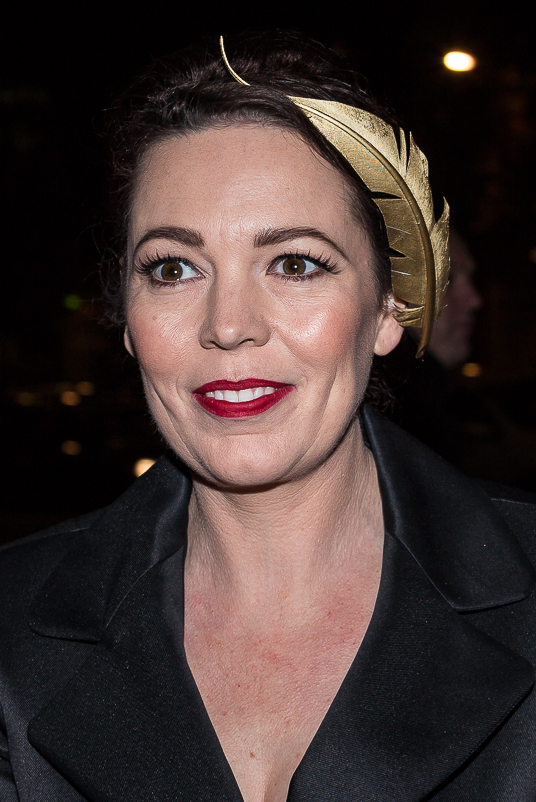
Olivia Colman, Best Actress winner

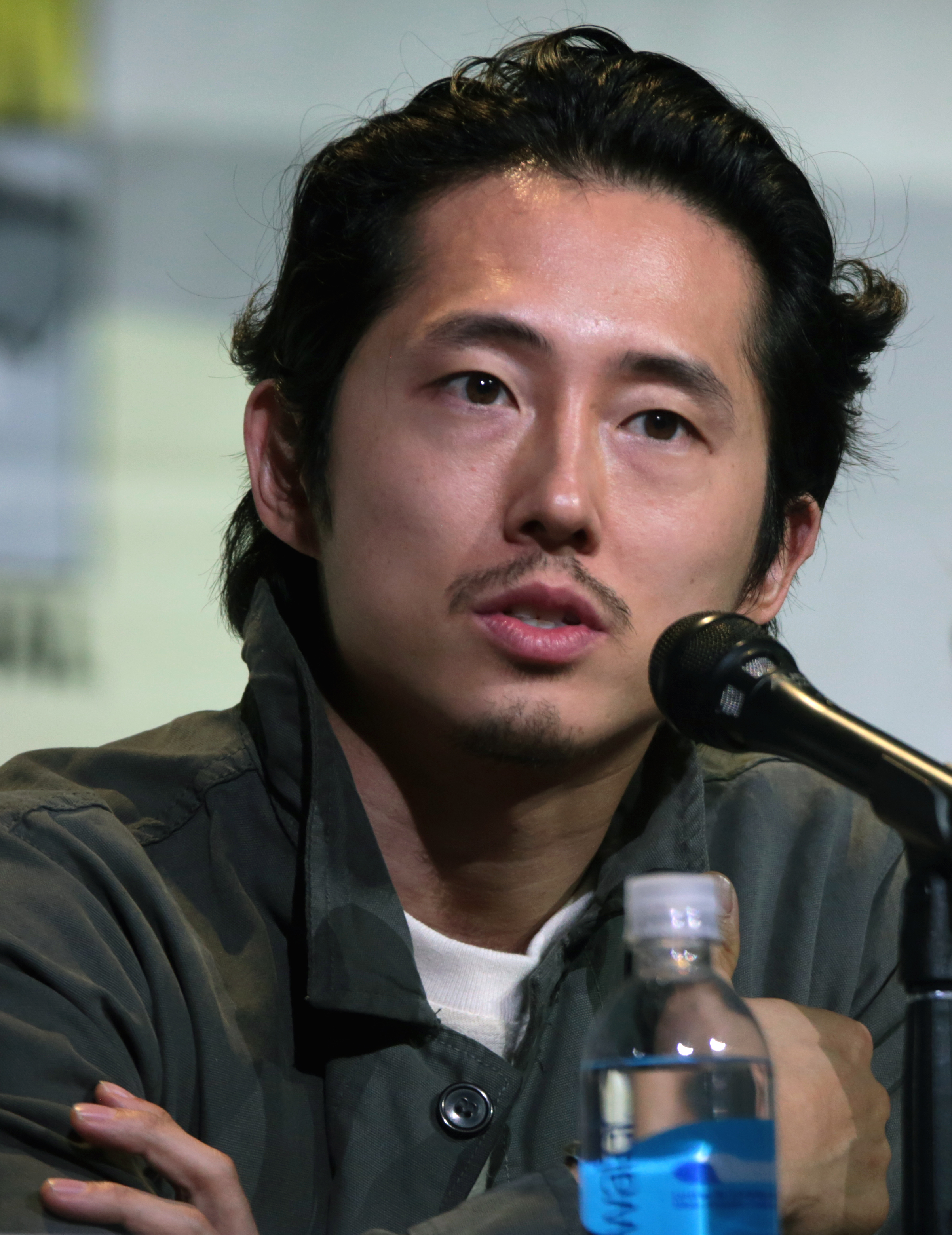
Steven Yeun, Best Supporting Actor winner

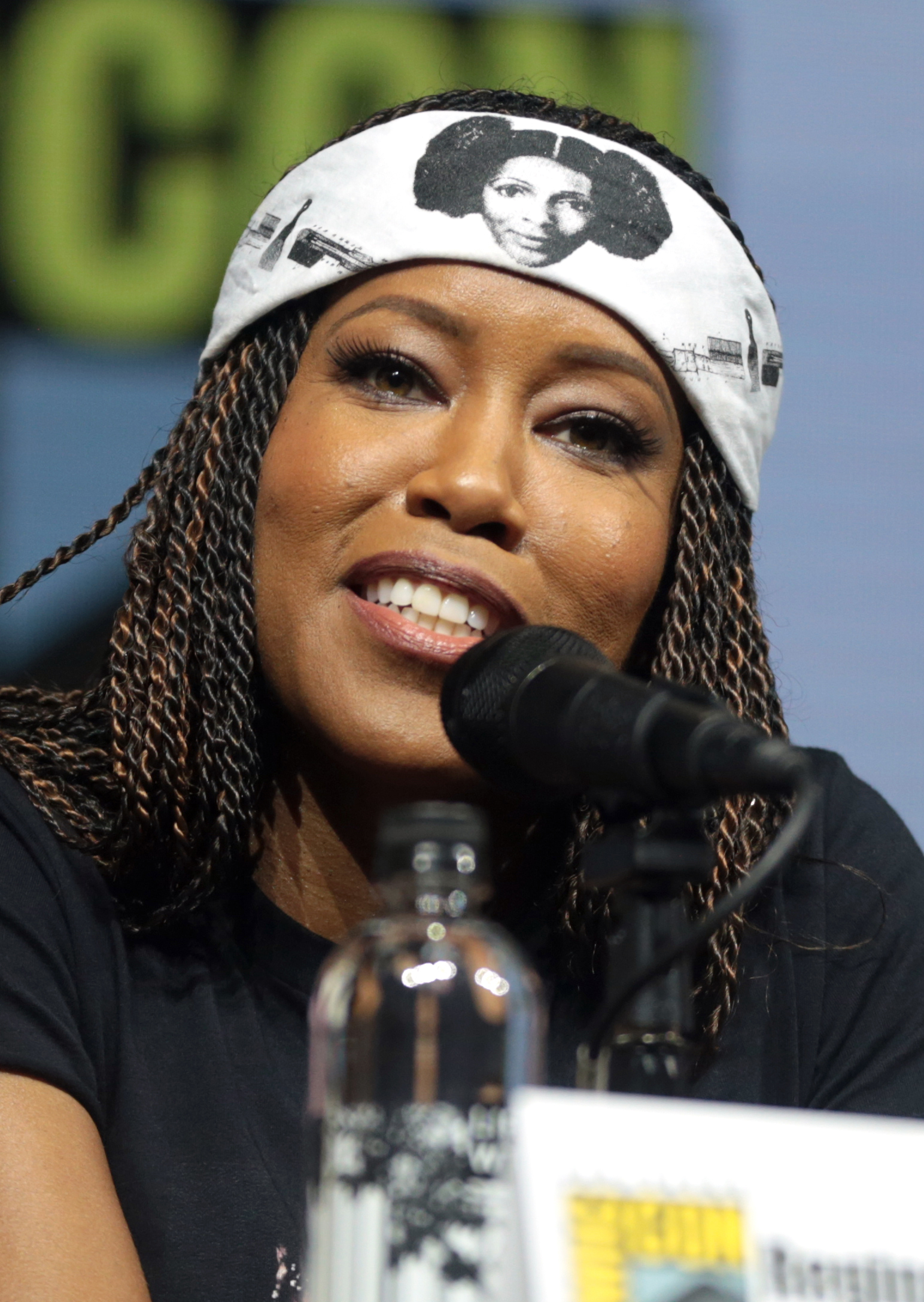
Regina King, Best Supporting Actress winner

- Best Picture:
  - Roma
    - Runner-up: Burning
- Best Director:
  - Debra Granik – Leave No Trace
    - Runner-up: Alfonso Cuarón – Roma
- Best Actor:
  - Ethan Hawke – First Reformed
    - Runner-up: Ben Foster – Leave No Trace
- Best Actress:
  - Olivia Colman – The Favourite
    - Runner-up: Toni Collette – Hereditary
- Best Supporting Actor:
  - Steven Yeun – Burning
    - Runner-up: Hugh Grant – Paddington 2
- Best Supporting Actress:
  - Regina King – If Beale Street Could Talk
    - Runner-up: Elizabeth Debicki – Widows
- Best Screenplay:
  - Nicole Holofcener and Jeff Whitty – Can You Ever Forgive Me?
    - Runner-up: Deborah Davis and Tony McNamara – The Favourite
- Best Cinematography:
  - Alfonso Cuarón – Roma
    - Runner-up: James Laxton – If Beale Street Could Talk
- Best Editing:
  - Joshua Altman and Bing Liu – Minding the Gap
    - Runner-up: Alfonso Cuarón and Adam Gough – Roma
- Best Production Design:
  - Hannah Beachler – Black Panther
    - Runner-up: Fiona Crombie – The Favourite
- Best Music Score:
  - Nicholas Britell – If Beale Street Could Talk
    - Runner-up: Justin Hurwitz – First Man
- Best Foreign Language Film (TIE):
  - Burning • South Korea
  - Shoplifters • Japan
- Best Documentary/Non-Fiction Film:
  - Shirkers
    - Runner-up: Minding the Gap
- Best Animation:
  - Spider-Man: Into the Spider-Verse
    - Runner-up: Incredibles 2
- New Generation Award:
  - Chloé Zhao
- Career Achievement Award:
  - Hayao Miyazaki
- The Douglas Edwards Experimental/Independent Film/Video Award:
  - Evan Johnson, Galen Johnson, and Guy Maddin – The Green Fog
- Special Citation:
  - The Other Side of the Wind
