= International Cinephile Society =

Film critics' organization

- Formation: 2003
- Purpose: Film critics
- Members: 170 (2024)
- Website: icsfilm.org

The International Cinephile Society is an online organization of professional film critics and journalists worldwide. It was founded in 2003 and, as of February 2024, has approximately 170 members—among them are Mike D'Angelo, Justin Chang (Los Angeles Times), and Stephanie Zacharek (Time).

Led by Cédric Succivalli, each year the organization honors the finest in international cinema. Its nominations have been noted for being different from other awards' submissions, such as the Academy Awards. Their annual announcements have received coverage from Variety, IndieWire, and Screendaily.

== Award categories ==
- Best Picture
- Best Director
- Best Foreign Language Film
- Best Actor
- Best Actress
- Best Supporting Actor
- Best Supporting Actress
- Best Original Screenplay
- Best Adapted Screenplay
- Best Cinematography
- Best Editing
- Best Production Design
- Best Original Score
- Best Ensemble
- Best Animated Film
- Best Documentary
- Best Breakthrough Performance
