= Movie theaters in South Korea =

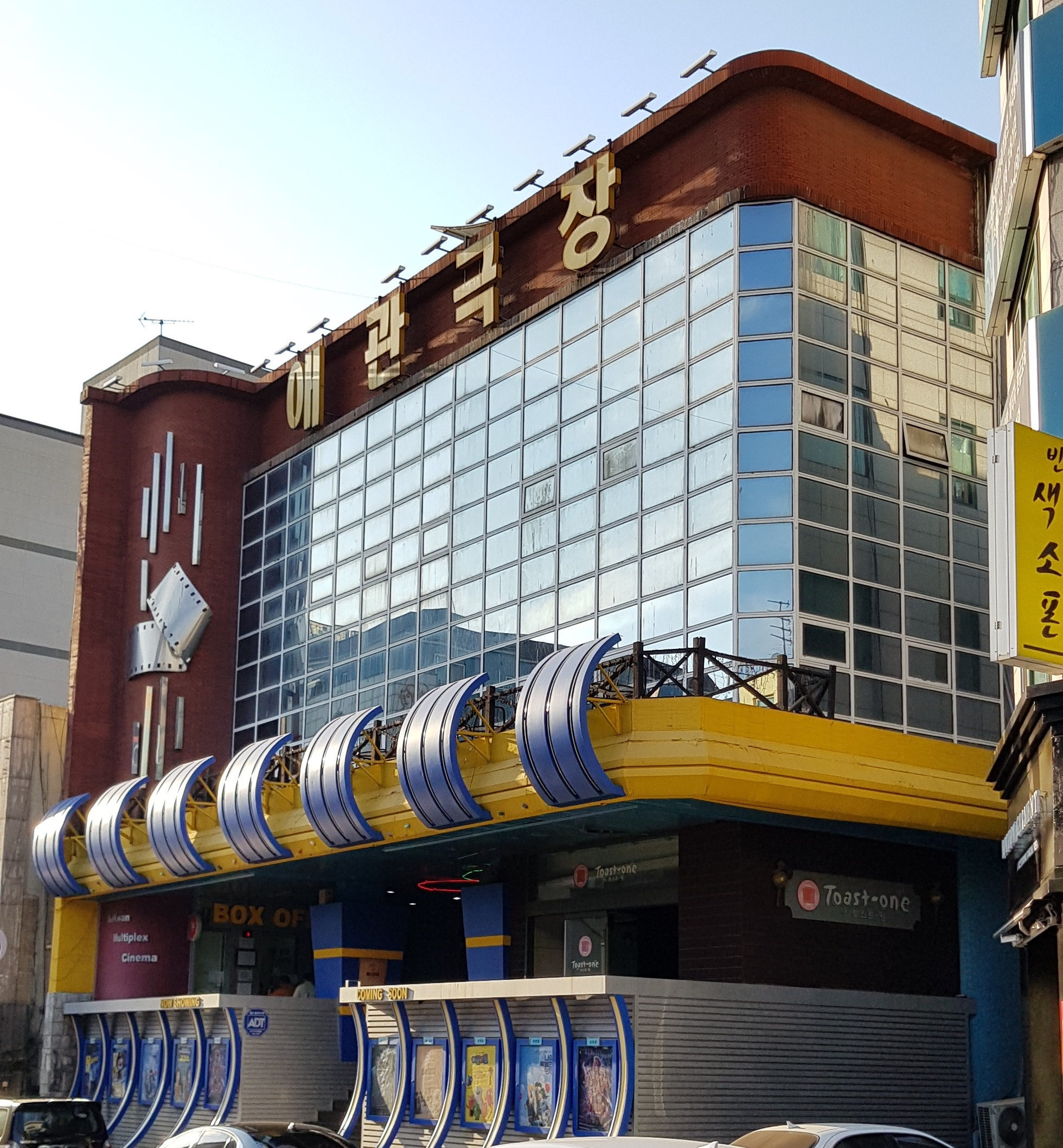
The first movie theater in Korea, Ae Kwan Theater

Movie theaters have existed in what is now South Korea for over a century now. The earliest theaters arrived in the peninsula beginning in the late Joseon period. The first known dedicated theater was Ae Kwan Theater, which was founded in 1895 and is still in operation as of 2023. Other notable early theaters include the 1907 Dansungsa and the 1910 Umigwan. During the 1910–1945 Japanese colonial period, theaters became naturally divided along the lines of language, with Japanese audiences attending some theaters and Korean audiences attending others. This caused Korean theaters to become forums for Korean independence activism, which led to frequent arrests during movie screenings.

Between the liberation and division of Korea in 1945, and the end of the Korean War in 1953, the Korean film industry experienced significant disruption. Poverty was widespread around this time, which led to significantly depressed movie attendance. By the late 1950s, the industry began to recover, with the historic one-screen Daehan Theater opening in 1958. The industry grew rapidly until the beginning of the 1970s, until the rise of televisions and strict media censorship laws.

The industry experienced another historic disruption in the 1990s, with the rise of multiplex theaters. Historic one-screen theaters like Dansungsa and Daehan Theater experienced significant declines in revenue, and eventually moved to remodel into multiplexes. Dansungsa did not survive the transition, and permanently closed by 2010.

Since the 1990s, the industry has consolidated, with the companies CGV, Lotte Cinema, and Megabox owning significant market share. South Korea has also since become an innovator in the field of movie technology, with technologies such as 4DX and ScreenX having been invented in the country and exported abroad. Concession snacks have also diversified, with numerous flavors of popcorn and a variety of foods being served.

== History ==
=== Early history ===
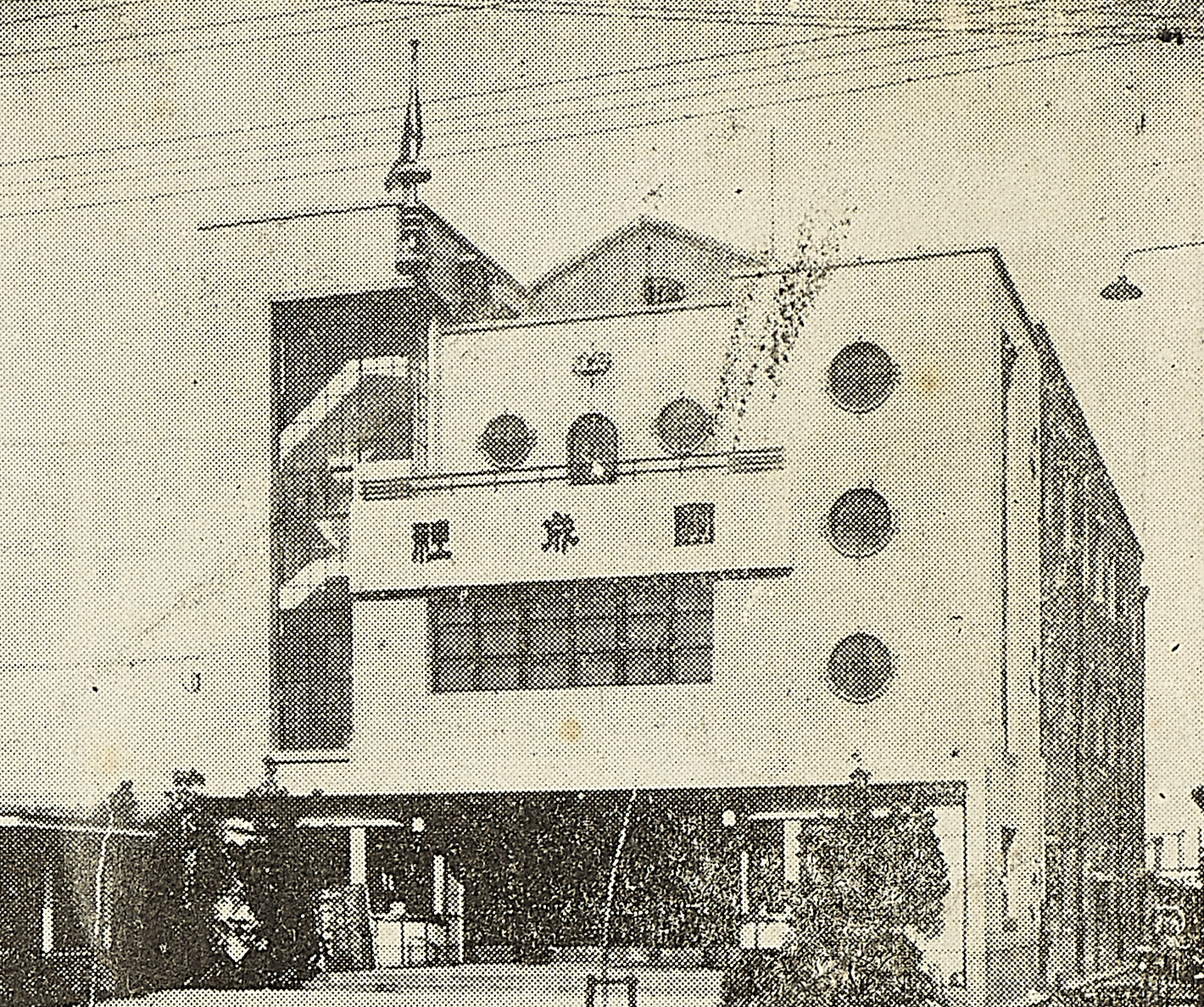
The historic theater Dansungsa (c. 1937)

Movie theaters first arose in Korea during the Joseon and Korean Empire periods. The first dedicated movie theater on the Korean peninsula was Ae Kwan Theater in Incheon, which opened in 1895 and is still in operation as of 2023. Dansungsa, a theater in Seoul that opened in 1907, was widely believed to have held that title until recently. Dansungsa has also since ceased operation, and now hosts a jewelry business.

Another notable theater was Hyomnyulsa, which opened in 1902 in Seoul, although it was not intended to be a permanent theater.

Umigwan was another movie theatre that opened during this time. This theatre was capable of playing imported movies from France because of the facility having up-to-date video equipment.

=== Japanese colonial period ===
From 1910 to 1945, Korea was a colony of the Empire of Japan. When American films were shown in the country, theatres became segregated by whether they used the Korean or Japanese language. Japanese audiences went to Namchon to watch movies, whereas Korean audiences went to Bukchon.

Theaters became seen as a public space for political discourse. For instance, street demonstrations were difficult due to the Japanese military, so instead, audiences in Danseongsa and Umiguwan shouted "Independence of Korea" during film screening as a form of protest. In one particular instance at the Chosun Theatre on December 13, 1929, Kim Moo-sam, secretary of the newspaper The Chosun Ilbo, was arrested for reading a document on the Gwangju Student Independence Movement during a film screening. Because of incidents such as these, the colonial government became known to interrupt films to catch dissidents.

=== After 1945 ===
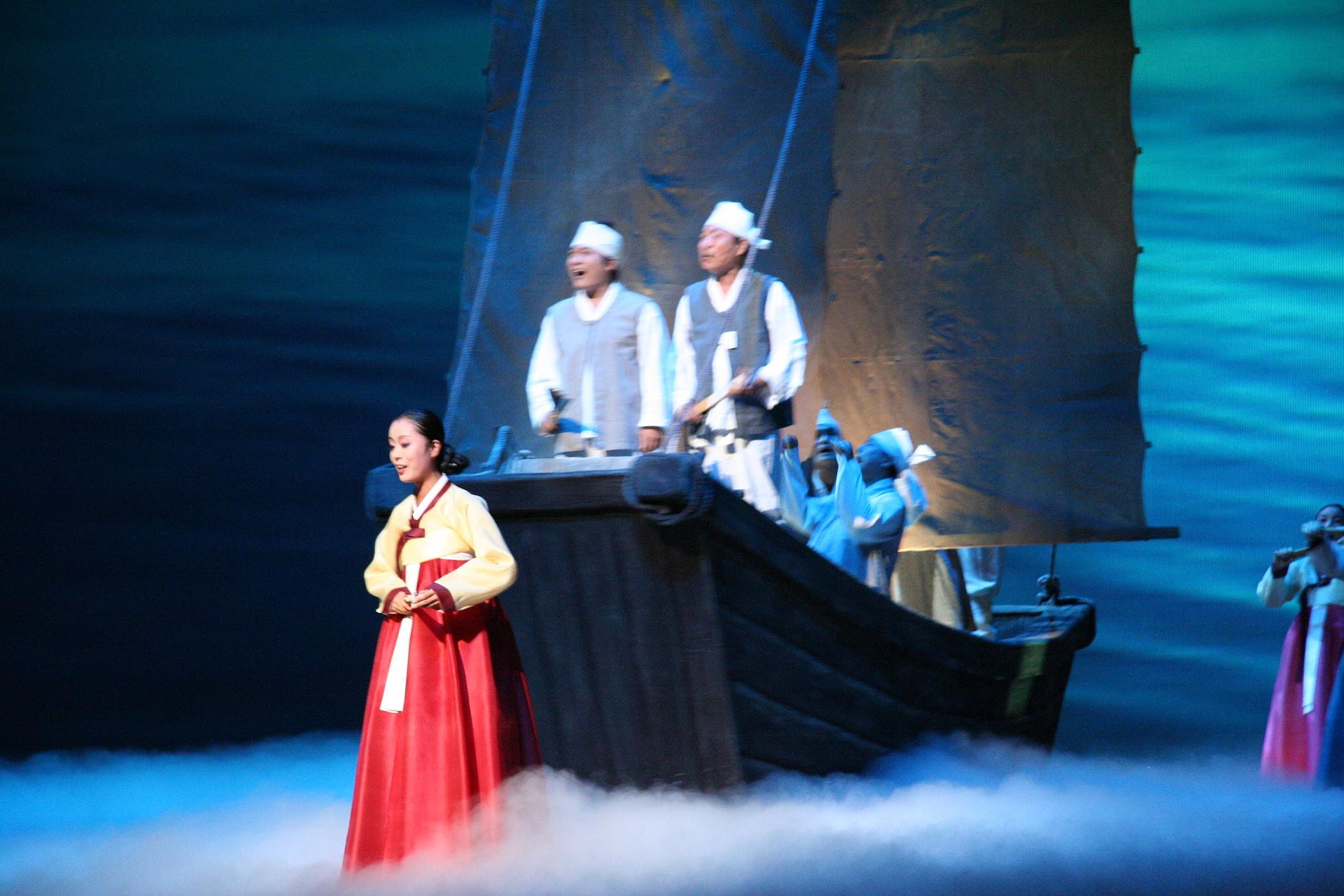
A Changgeuk performance (2006)

Korea was liberated in 1945, although it was immediately divided into northern and southern occupation zones. This eventually led to the 1950–1953 Korean War. These events had significant impact on the film industry. Poverty was rife after the war, which led to a glut in the film industry. As a result, public entertainment was often limited to either foreign films or original theatre productions. This led to the rise of Changgeuk, a genre of Korean opera.

=== Revival and turbulence ===
Beginning in the late 1950s, the domestic film industry experienced a revival. Films began to be produced and consumed in volume once again, and theaters began achieving financial success. In 1958, the historic single-screen Daehan Theater opened, and held the reputation of being one of the most prestigious and successful theaters in the city until around the 1980s. In 1962, there was a 34.8% increase of movie watchers in the country over the previous year.

However, once television became widespread in the early 1970s, the number of moviegoers began to decline. In addition, strict censorship laws made the production of films more difficult. The slump continued during the late 1970s.

By the 1980s, newer, foreign films were popular with the younger and more educated. Older and domestic films were popular with the other groups. The more educated tended to be more urbanized, with higher exposure to foreign culture and films.

A series of technological changes significantly impacted the industry beginning in the mid 1980s. IMAX reached the country in 1985, with the first such screen in the famous 63 Building. Another opened later at the 1993 World Expo in Daejeon. As of 2017, there were a total of 16 IMAX theaters in the country.

One of the most significant changes was the rise of multiplex theaters with more modern amenities. They quickly took away market share from single-screen theaters. Multiplexes were appealing because they offered a greater variety of films and even other activities in the same place; people could engage in other activities while waiting for their films to start. However, this trend proved an existential threat to many of the country's historic theaters. Dansungsa was renovated in 2001 to become a multiplex, but it failed to pay back its debts and closed permanently by 2010. Daehan Theater too was renovated beginning in 2000, although it survived the transition and continues to be in operation as of 2023.

Around the 1990s, the novelty of drive-in theaters also emerged. The first drive-in theater of South Korea opened on April 23, 1994 at Bearstown in Pocheon, Gyeonggi Province. It had a large screen, measuring 12 meters wide and 5 meters long. Drive-ins were seen as luxuries and status symbols, as private cars were difficult to afford for many people at the time.

== Recent history ==
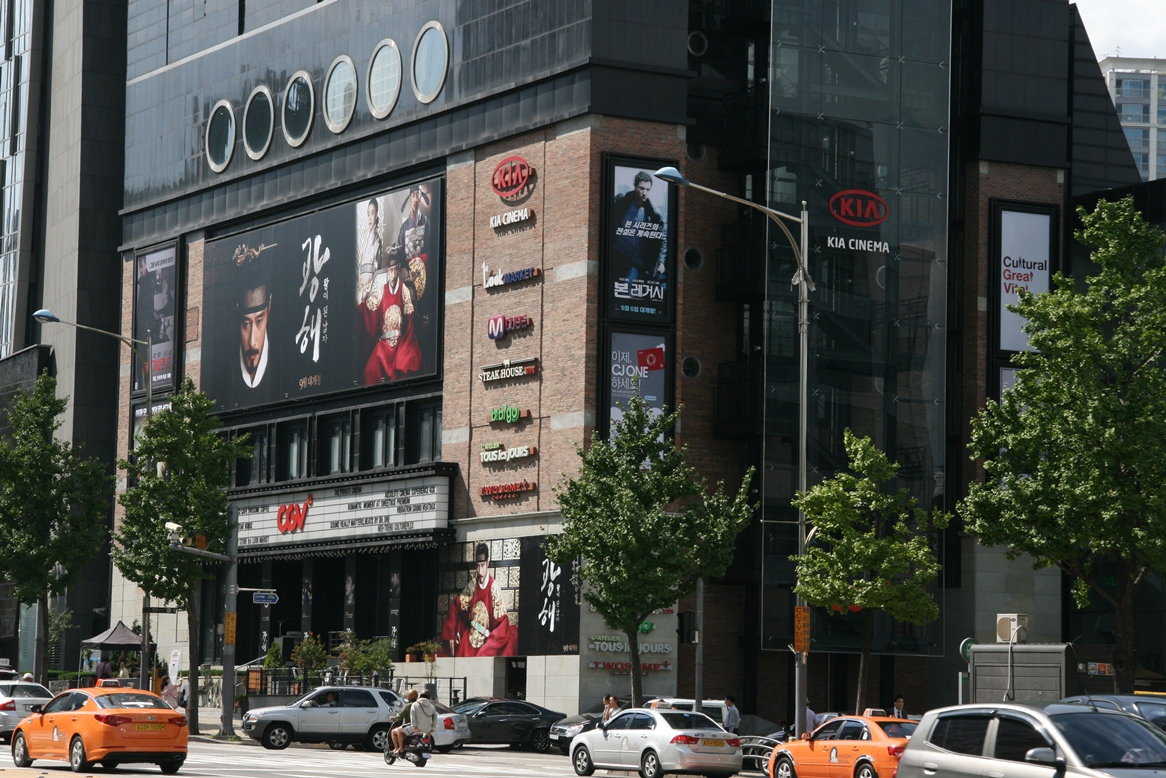
A CGV Theatre in Gangnam (2012)

Despite the loss of some historic original theaters, multiplexes have since led to a boom in film viewership since the turn of the century.

The era has seen the rise of consolidation and the decline of smaller theaters, however. Currently, the companies CGV, Lotte Cinema, and Megabox dominate the industry.

=== Technological and conceptual innovation ===
Other technologies have continued to be added to the theaters. 4D theaters now exist in the country, with CJ 4DPLEX, a CGV subsidiary, opening the world's first 4D theater. It opened its first 4DX theater at CGV Sangam in 2009. Dolby Atmos first appeared in the country in 2012. South Korean movie technology companies have also emerged as global technology leaders, and have seen been contracted to install equipment in theaters abroad.

ScreenX is a screen system that utilizes not only the front screen of a movie theater but also the left and right walls as a screen, so surrounded by three screens. It is currently installed on 64 screens in 50 theaters nationwide. It is the world's first multi-face screening system that was co-developed by CGV and the Korea Advanced Institute of Science and Technology (KAIST) in 2013.

A hologram performance was held in 2014, that involved the musicians Psy, BigBang, and 2NE1 at the concert hall "Klive", which was funded by the government Ministry of Science, ICT and Information and Communication and the private company KT. It offered a 270-degree view media facade.

Some theaters target specific audiences. "Silver Cinemas" cater to the elderly. One such theater is located in the Jongno District. It offers discounted tickets for senior citizens over 55, and shows movies that the elderly might have seen when they were young.

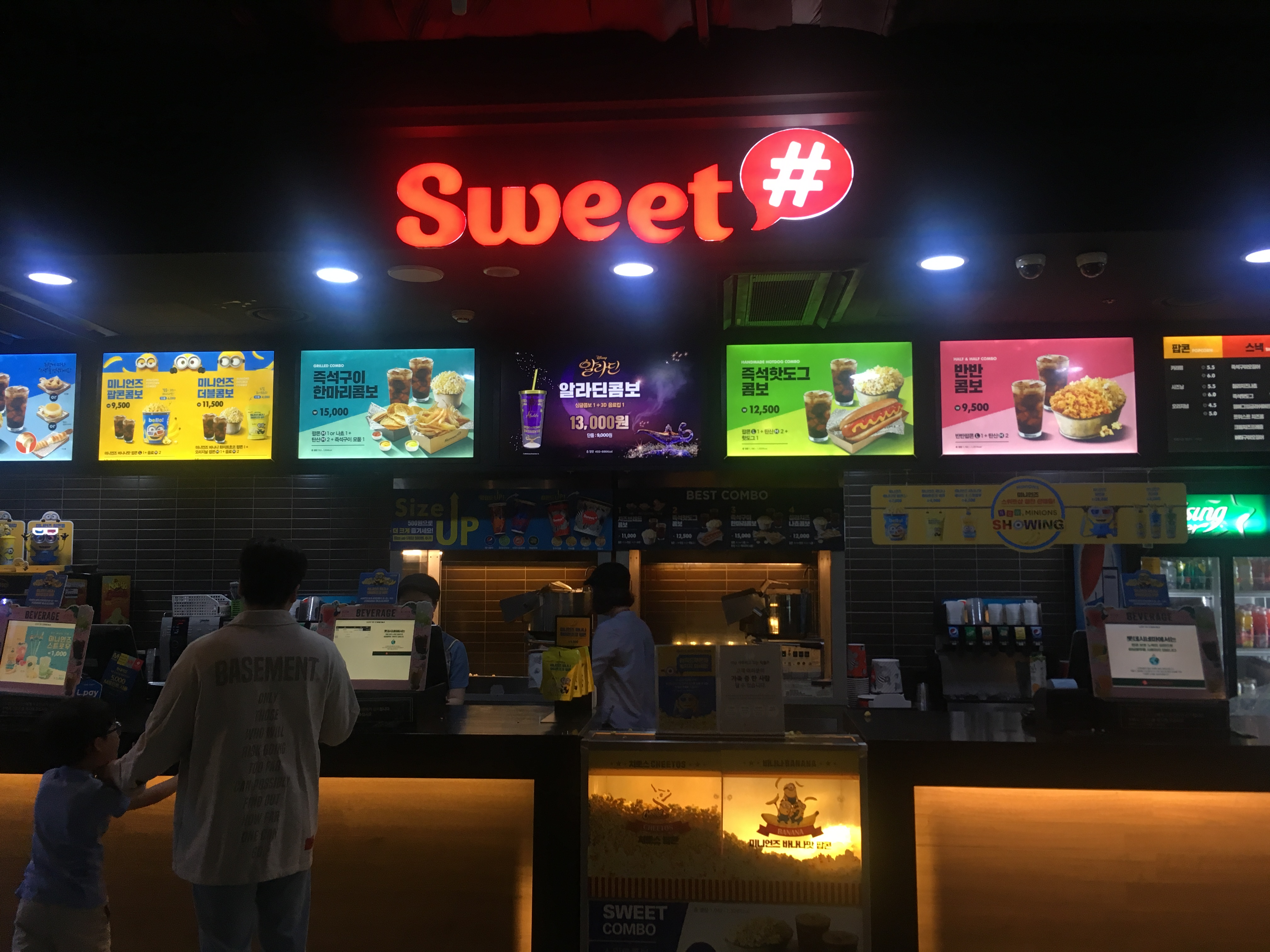
Concessions in a Lotte Cinema (2019)

The South Korean government encourages a "Culture Day", which is the last Wednesday of each month. Movie theaters and other facilities like museums offer services at a discount or even for free on those days. Some theaters now sell alcohol and an increased variety of snack foods, including flavored popcorns, fried chicken, sausages, and different potato dishes.
