= National Dance Company of Korea =

Korean dance company

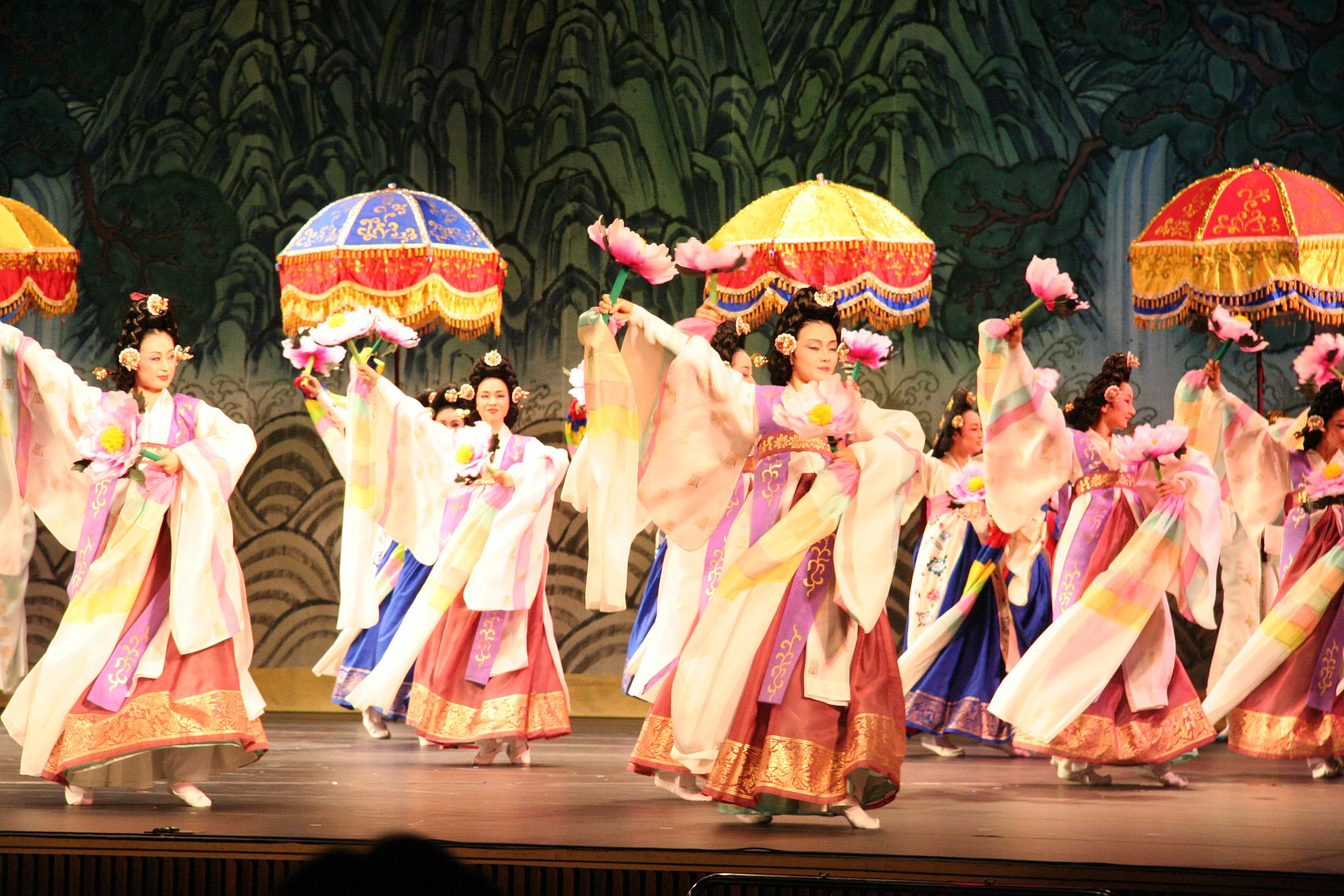
- A 2006 performance of "Light of Dawn" by the dance company.

Korean name
- Hangul: 국립무용단
- Hanja: 國立舞踊團
- RR: Gungnip muyongdan
- MR: Kungnip muyongdan

The National Dance Company of Korea is the national dance company of South Korea.

== Affiliation ==
The dance company is affiliated with the National Theater of Korea, located in the neighborhood of Jangchung-dong, Jung-gu, central Seoul. The National Dance Company of Korea, along with the National Theater Company of Korea, the National Changguk Company Of Korea, and the National Orchestra Company of Korea, mainly perform there.

== History and Work ==
National Dance Company of Korea was established by the director, Im Seong-nam (임성남) and 12 other dancers in February 1962. Since then, it has been a representative dance company in South Korea with the purpose to create new dances based on Korean traditional dance and to perform the works. By participating in various international festivals, National Dance Company has presented the world, its rich repertoire.
From October 2006 to April 2007 Soul, Sunflower, the dance production of National Dance Company and the German Musical group Saltacello (Peter Schindler) has been several sold-out appearances in Seoul. This production is a unique cultural cooperation between Germany and Korea and re-create the Korean dance Salpuri with a modern interpretation.
Nearly since fifty years, the National Dance Company of Korea has expressed the feeling of Korean humans and the aesthetic appeal of Korean culture in dance performances.

== Gallery ==
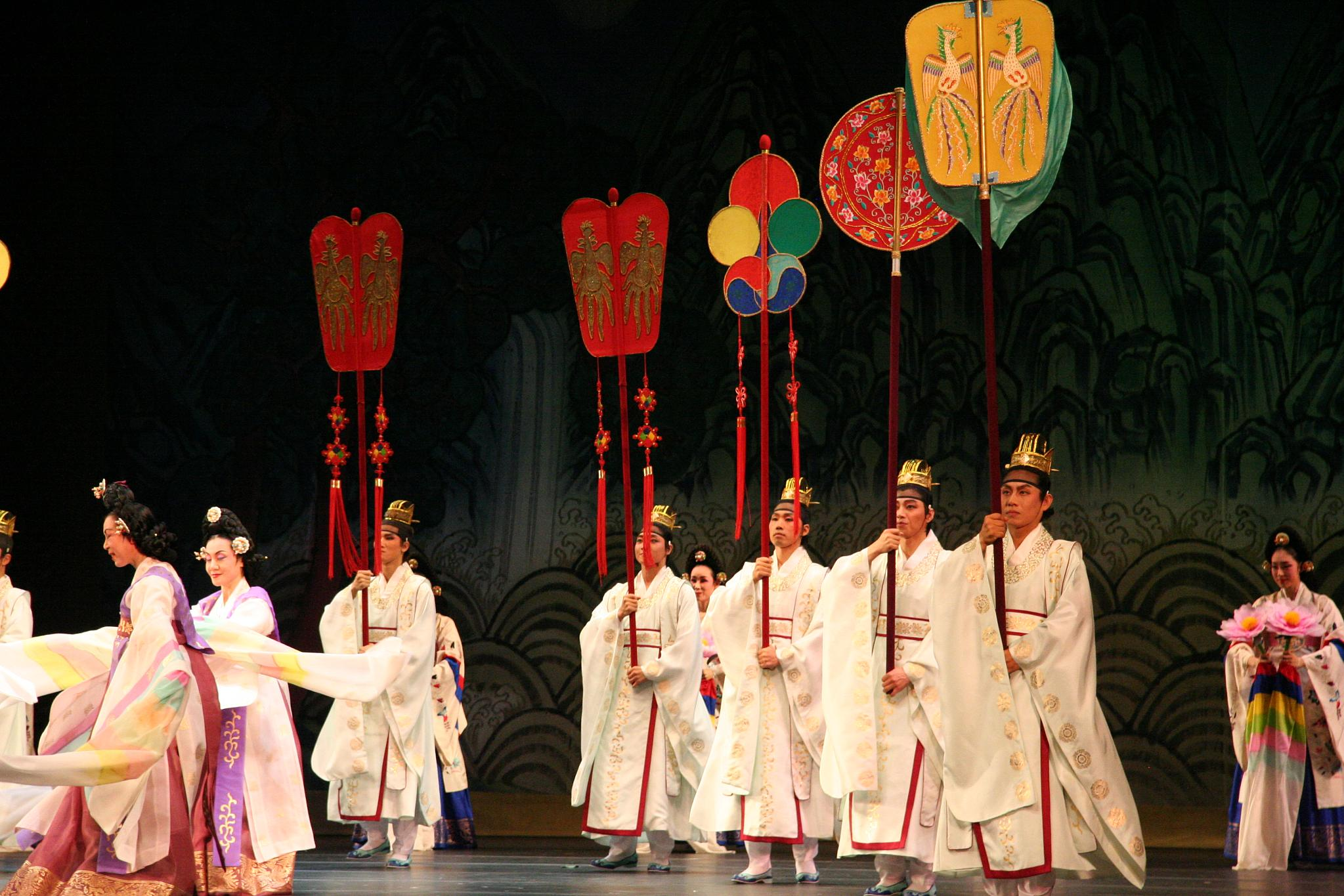
Light of Dawn (여명의 빛)

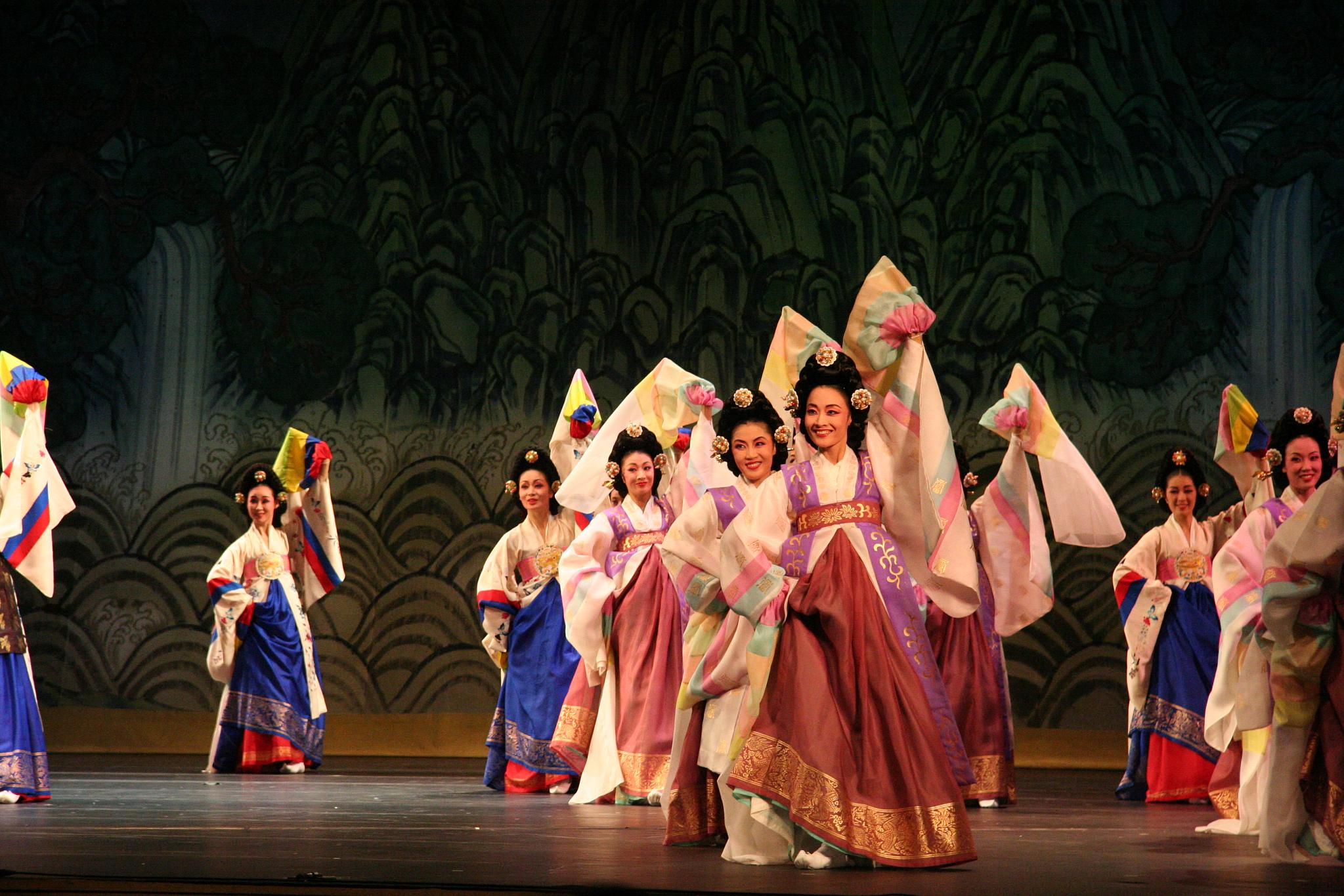
Light of Dawn (여명의 빛)

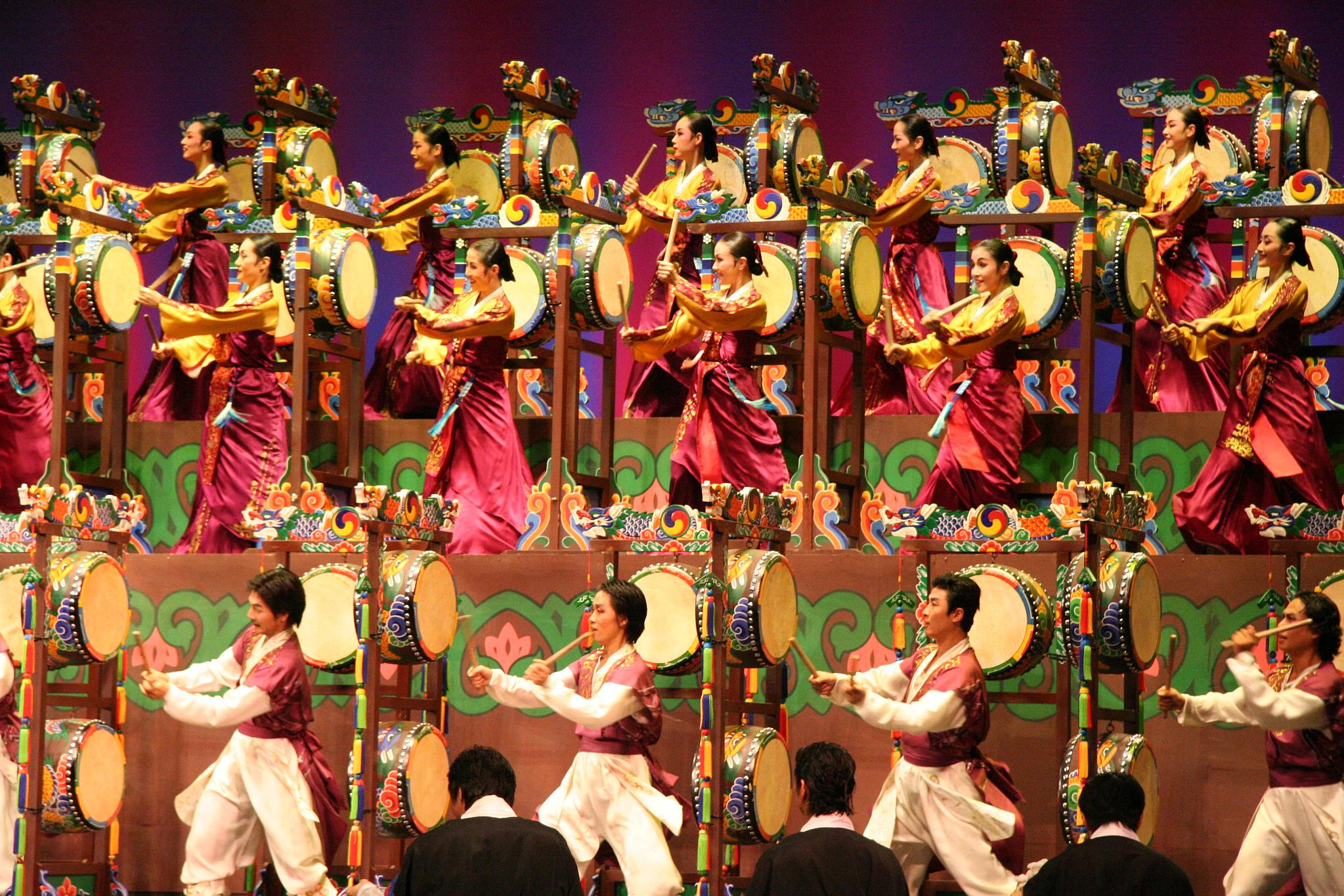
Samgomu Ogomu (삼고무 오고무)

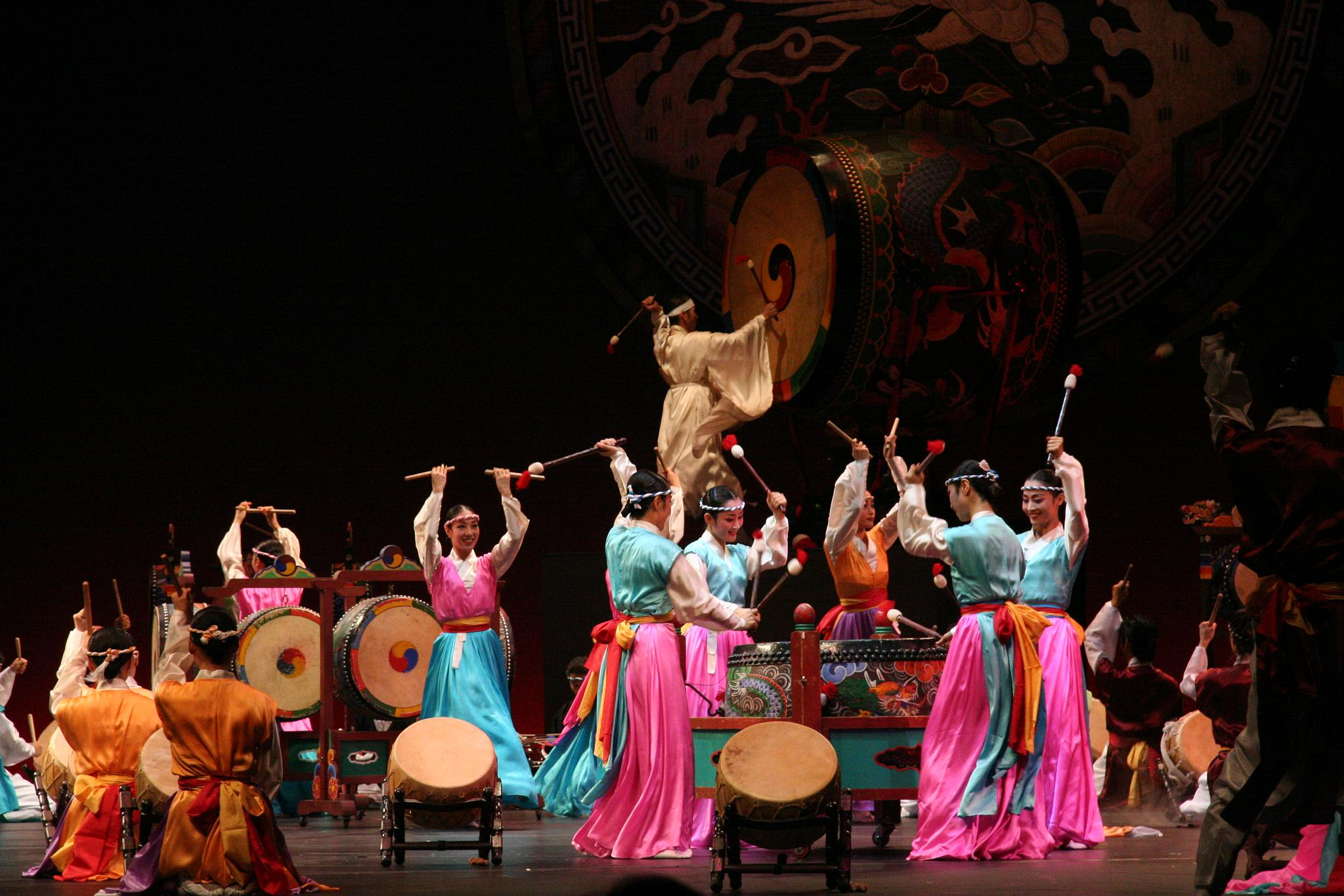
Grand Drum Ensemble (북의 대합주)

== See also ==
- List of dance companies
- Korean dance
- The National Center for Korean Traditional Performing Arts
- Changgeuk
