= Korean opera =

Korean opera may refer to:

- Changgeuk, Korean musical drama since 1902
- Korean revolutionary opera, North Korean music theatre since 1971
- Western opera in Korean

== See also ==
- Korea National Opera
- Korean theatre
