= 金湖 =

金湖, meaning "golden lake", may refer to:

In the Mandarin Chinese reading Jīnhú:

- Jinhu County, Huai'an, Jiangsu, People's Republic of China
- Jinhu, Kinmen, township in Fukien Province, Republic of China

In the Korean reading Geumho (also spelled Kǔmho):

- Geumho-dong, Seungdong-gu, Seoul, South Korea
- Geumho Station, Seoul Metro station in Geumho-dong, Seungdong-gu, Seoul, South Korea
- Geumho-dong (Gwangju), Seo-gu, Gwangju, South Korea; see List of administrative divisions in Gwangju

== See also ==
Places with the same meaning in other languages:

- Gold Lake, California, United States
- Golden Lake, Ontario, Canada
- Golden Lake (Nova Scotia), Canada
- Altyn-Köl, Altai Republic, Russia
