= Chungmu =

Chungmu may refer to:

- Chungmu (충무, 忠武, literally “loyal valor”), the posthumous name given to the great military commanders of the Joseon Dynasty. Those who were given the posthumous title are called Chungmugong (충무공, 忠武公, “ Lord of Loyal Valor”).
  - Chungmugong Jo Yeong-mu (조영무, 趙英茂, ?-1414)
  - Chungmugong Nam I (남이, 南怡, 1441-1468)
  - Chungmugong Yi Jun (구성군, 龜城君, 1441-1479)
  - Chungmugong Yi Sun-sin (이순신, 李舜臣, 1545-1598) - Both the name and title of Chungmu have become nearly synonymous with Yi Sun-sin.
  - Chungmugong Kim Si-min (김시민, 金時敏, 1554-1592)
  - Chungmugong Yi Su-il (이수일, 李守一, 1554-1632)
  - Chungmugong Jeong Chung-sin (정충신, 鄭忠信, 1576-1636)
  - Chungmugong Gu In-hu (구인후, 具仁垕, 1578-1658)
  - Chungmugong Kim Eung-ha (김응하, 金應河, 1580-1619)
- Chungmu City - City in South Korea. It was absorbed to Tongyeong in 1994
- Chungmu-dong - Administrative unit of South Korea
- Chungmuro - The street in Seoul
- Chungmuro Station - The station in Seoul
- Chungmugong Yi Sun-sin class destroyer - The multipurpose destroyer of the Republic of Korea Navy
- Chungmu Kimbap - A type of gimbap
- Chungmu - Taekwondo Form
- A degree of the Order of Military Merit (Korea)
