= Golden Lake (disambiguation) =

Golden Lake is a lake in Ontario, Canada.

Golden Lake or Golden Lakes may also refer to:

- Golden Lake (Minnesota), a lake in Anoka County
- Golden Lake (Nova Scotia), a lake of Halifax Regional Municipality
- Golden Lakes, Florida, a former town
- Golden Lakes (Washington), in Mount Rainier National Park
- The Golden Lake, an 1890 novel by Carlton Dawe

== See also ==
- Algonquins of Pikwàkanagàn First Nation, formerly called Golden Lake First Nation
