= National Changgeuk Company of Korea =

Coordinates: 37°33′9″N 127°0′0″E

National Changgeuk Company of Korea is a changgeuk organization founded in 1962 (63 years ago) with the objective of "reviving the beauty and spirit of Korean songs."

== See also ==
- National Theater of Korea
- Traditional music of Korea
- Contemporary culture of South Korea
- Korean theater
