= Mukjeong-dong =

Neighbourhood in Seoul, South Korea

- Interactive map of Mukjeong-dong
- Country: South Korea

Area
  - Total: 0.06 km^{2} (0.023 sq mi)

Korean name
- Hangul: 묵정동
- Hanja: 墨井洞
- RR: Mukjeong-dong
- MR: Mukchŏng-dong

Mukjeong-dong (Korean: 묵정동) is a legal dong (neighbourhood) of Jung District, Seoul, South Korea. It is administered by Jangchung-dong.

== See also ==
- Administrative divisions of South Korea
