= Dongguk University station =

Train station in Seoul, South Korea

동대입구; Dongguk Univ.
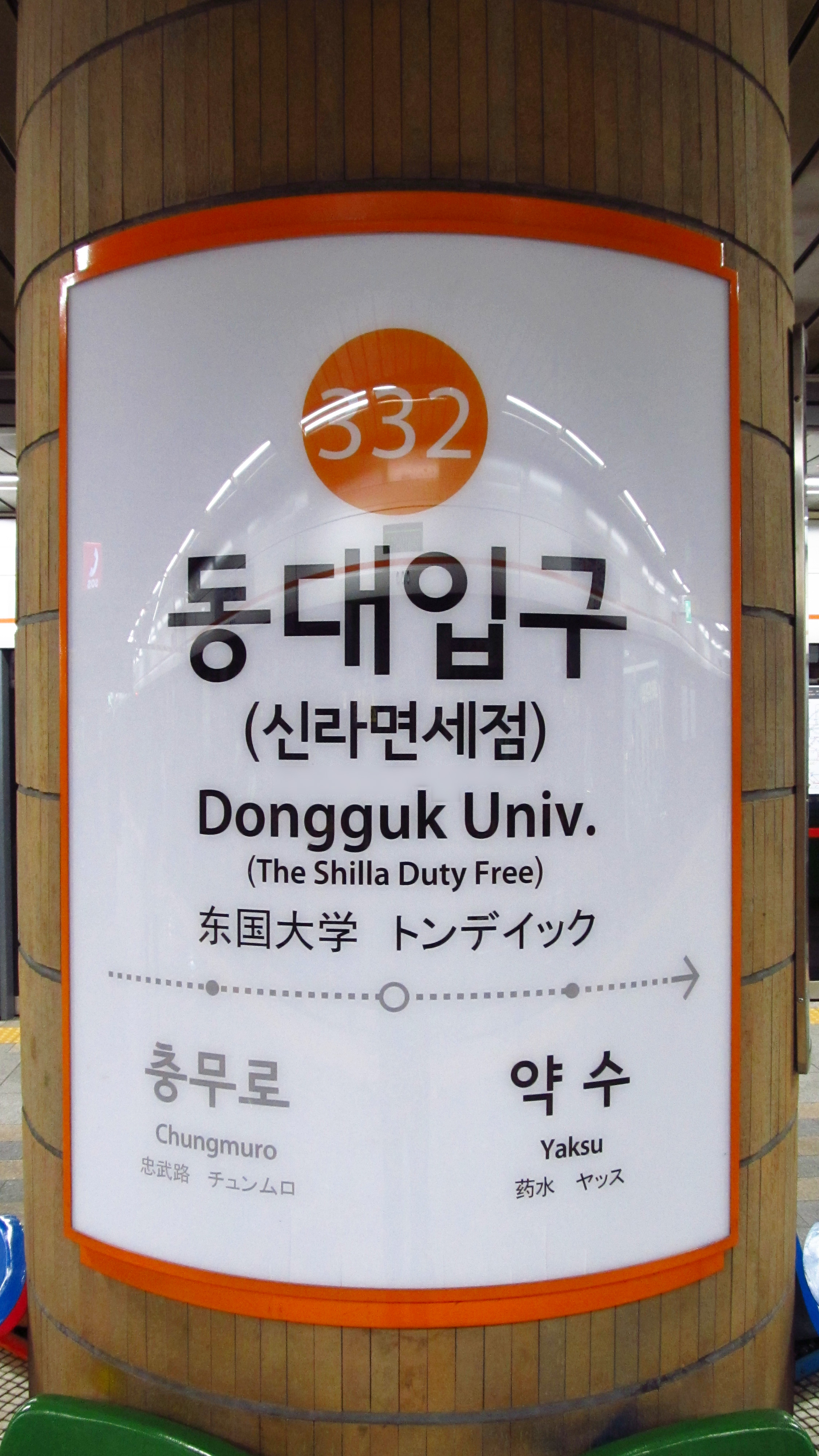

Korean name
- Hangul: 동대입구역
- Hanja: 東大入口驛
- Revised Romanization: Dongdaeipgu-yeok
- McCune–Reischauer: Tongdaeipku-yŏk

General information
- Location: 256 Donghoro Jiha, 189-2 Jangchung-dong 2-ga, Jung District, Seoul
- Coordinates: 37°33′33″N 127°00′20″E
- Operator: Seoul Metro
- Line: Line 3
- Platforms: 1
- Tracks: 2

Construction
- Structure type: Underground

Key dates
- October 18, 1985: Line 3 opened
Location

Dongguk University Station (Korean: 동대입구역) is a station on the Seoul Subway Line 3 located in Jangchung-dong 2-ga, Jung District, Seoul, South Korea. As its name indicates, it serves the nearby Dongguk University. In addition, Jangchung Gymnasium, an indoor sports arena most famous for hosting ssireum (Korean wrestling) matches on holidays, is outside Exit 5. It is also the closest station to Shilla Hotel.

== Station layout ==
G	Street level	Exit

L1; Concourse	Lobby	Customer Service, Shops, Vending machines, ATMs

L2; Platform	Northbound	← Line 3 toward Daehwa (Chungmuro)
L2; Platform	Island platform, doors will open on the left
L2; Platform	Southbound	Line 3 toward Ogeum (Yaksu) →

== Vicinity ==
- Jokbal Street

Jangchungdong (administrative name of this area) is famous for food shops serving Jokbal, Bindaetteok and Cola.

- Jangchungdan Park

Entrance No.6 comes out in Janchungdan park with many paths and a roller-skating rink.

- Street Stalls

There are many near entrance no. 2 serving for example Tteokbokki, Mandu and Sundae.

Preceding station	Seoul Metropolitan Subway	Following station
Chungmuro towards Daehwa	Line 3	Yaksu towards Ogeum
