= Kim Ja-rim =

South Korean playwright (1926–1994)

- 김자림
- Born: August 21, 1926; Pyongyang, Korea, Empire of Japan
- Died: September 26, 1994 (aged 68); Seattle, Washington State, United States of America
- Education: Pyongyang Normal School (dropped out of Korean language department)
- Occupations: Playwright; Essayist; Teacher
- Spouse: Yang Myong-mun
- Writing career
- Language: Korean
- Period: 1959–1991
- Genres: Drama; Essay
- Notable work: Iminsun (Note: The Emigrant Ship, Korean: 이민선)

Kim Ja-rim (Note: Korean: 김자림; Hanja: 金玆林; pronounced [kim.t͡ɕa.rim]) (21 August 1926 – 26 September 1994) was a Korean playwright, essayist, and teacher. She was the first professional Korean female playwright.

Her childhood name was Kim Chŏngsuk. (Note: Romanized using the McCune–Reischauer system as she was born before the division of Korea per English Wikipedia's Korean naming conventions) (Note: Korean: 김정숙; Hanja: 金貞淑; pronounced [kim.t͡ɕʌŋ.suk])

== Life ==
Kim was born in Pyongyang during the period that Korea was under Japanese rule. She was the third daughter of nine children. Her father was a professor of pharmacy whose family followed traditional Confucian principles, and her mother was a Christian elementary school graduate. When she was young, Kim's mother was ill, so she was raised in "an enlightened and liberal environment" by her maternal grandmother.

After dropping out of Pyongyang Normal School, she worked as a teacher in Pyongyang before moving to Seoul in 1949. She married the poet Yang Myong-mun in 1952, marrying for love rather than a traditional arranged marriage. She continued to work as a teacher before making her debut in 1959 as a playwright with Dolgae-baram, (Note: The Whirlwind, Korean: 돌개바람) a one-act play published by Chosun Ilbo, South Korea's oldest daily newspaper.

== Work ==
Kim was the first professional Korean female playwright, among a group of others who wrote and had their work performed beginning in the 1960s, called the 'first generation of women playwrights' by scholar Lee Mi Won. According to Kim, she chose a career in drama because she believed in the social functions of art to "lead culture, purify emotion, and reveal humanity."

In 1959, she published her debut one-act play, Dolgae-baram. She received sharp criticism for it, the play being dismissed as a "common love story."

In 1965, she established the Women's Theater (Yoin Kukchang), a theatre company with the intention of "awakening" women through plays that dealt with women's issues from a female perspective.

Kim was the first female playwright to stage a play in the National Theater of Korea, her 1966 play Iminsun, which is considered to be her magnum opus. It features more than 28 characters on stage, and depicts a Korean farming community trying to move to Brazil to make more money.

An anthology of her early plays was published in 1971, also titled Iminsun. This collection includes her 1970 one-act Hwa-don. (Note: Flower Pig, Korean: 화돈)

As of 1984, she had produced twenty plays, five radio and TV dramas, and one novel.

== Bibliography ==
- Kim, Ock-Ran (October 31, 1999). "The Femininity and Modernity of Kim Ja-Rim's Drama in 1960s". The Journal of Korean Drama and Theatre (in Korean) (10). The Learned Society Of Korean Drama And Theatre: 93–136 – via Korea Journal Central.
- Kwon, Jingyeong (August 2023). 1960년대 여성 극작가의 가족 형상화 방식 : 김자림과 박현숙을 중심으로 [The Family Figuration of 1960s Women Playwright : Focusing on Kim Ja-rim and Park Hyon-sook] (Thesis) (in Korean). Korea University. doi:10.23186/korea.000000276503.11009.0000126.
