= Korean Film Museum =

Film museum in Seoul, South Korea

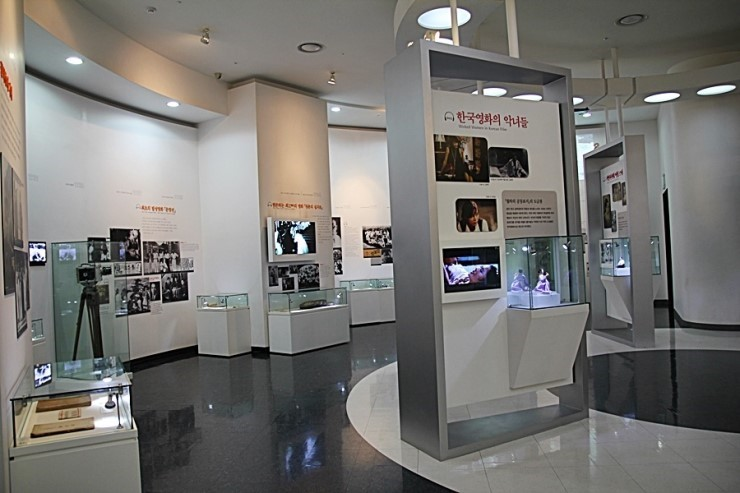
- Established: May 9, 2008
- Location: 400 Worldcupbuk-ro, Mapo District, Seoul, South Korea
- Coordinates: 37.580437°N 126.889479°E
- Owner: Korean Film Archive
- Nearest parking: On site (no charge)
- Website: eng.koreafilm.or.kr/pages/PC_00000104 (in English)

Korean name
- Hangul: 한국영화박물관
- Hanja: 韓國映畫博物館
- RR: Hanguk yeonghwa bangmulgwan
- MR: Han'guk yŏnghwa pangmulgwan

The Korean Film Museum (Korean: 한국영화박물관) is a national museum dedicated to the cinema of Korea located in Mapo District, Seoul, South Korea. It opened on May 9, 2008. Entrance is free of charge.

The museum is associated with the Korean Film Archive, and is physically located within the archive's main building. It was elevated to the status of national museum in 2015, and was the only film museum in South Korea at that time. It has hosted a number of special exhibits. Topics include women in cinema, 21st century cinema, and directors like Yu Hyun-mok.

Its permanent exhibits first cover the invention of film, then moves to how film spread to Korea during the Joseon and Korean Empire periods. It then covers the character of films in each major era of modern Korean history, including the Japanese colonial period, the Liberation of Korea, the Korean War, and South Korean film. It also highlights films, filmmakers, and actors that it finds exceptional and definitive to each time period.

== See also ==
- Ae Kwan Theater: first movie theater in Korea
- Dansungsa: historic Korean movie theater
- Cinema of Korea
- Cinema of South Korea
- List of museums in Seoul
- National Museum of Korean Contemporary History
