= Daehan Cinema =

Historic movie theater in Seoul, South Korea

Coordinates: 37.5611°N 126.9954°E

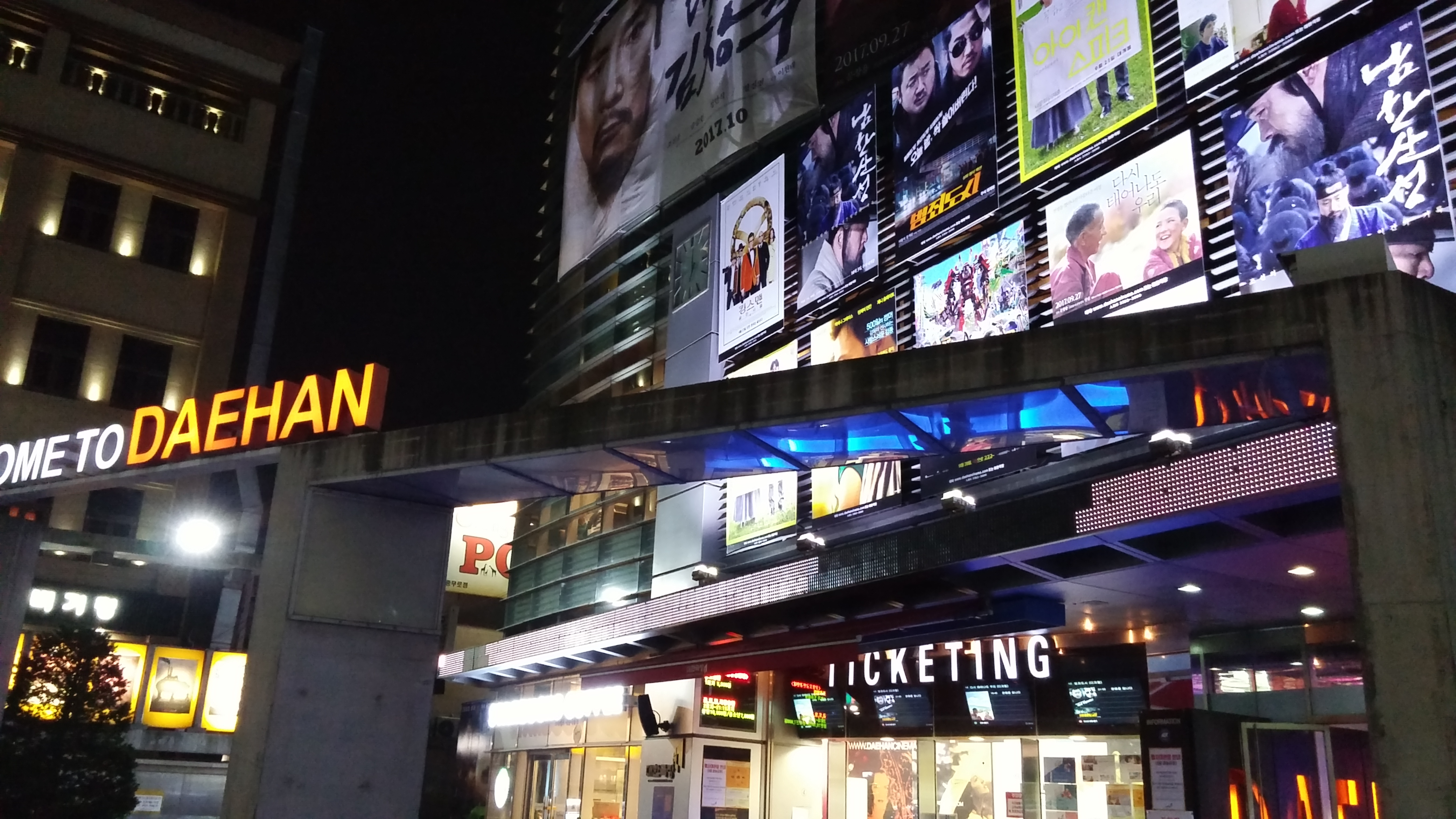
- An entrance to the theater (2017)
- Interactive map of the Daehan Cinema area

General information
- Type: Multiplex movie theater
- Location: 125-18, Chungmu-ro 4-ga, Jung District, Seoul, South Korea
- Opened: April 1958; 67 years ago
- Renovated: December 15, 2001 (reopened)

Technical details
- Floor count: 8

Design and construction
- Architect: 20th Century Fox (original)

Other information
- Seating capacity: 2,752

Website
- www.daehancinema.co.kr (in Korean)

Korean name
- Hangul: 대한극장
- Hanja: 大韓劇場
- RR: Daehan geukjang
- MR: Taehan kŭkchang

Daehan Cinema (Korean: 대한극장; Hanja: 大韓劇場) is a historic movie theater at Chungmu-ro, Jung District, Seoul, South Korea. It was founded in 1958 and was considered one of the premiere theaters in the country until the 1980s.

The building has an entrance within the Chungmuro station on lines 3 and 4 of the Seoul Metropolitan Subway.

== Description ==
The theater currently has eight floors (one basement and seven above-ground) that have eleven screens and a total seating capacity of 2,754.

== History ==
The theater was designed by the American company 20th Century Fox and established in April 1958. It originally had one screen. Its seating capacity was 1,900, the highest of any theater in Seoul at the time. The facilities were considered top-of-the-line at the time, with the latest technology and striking architecture.

It was considered a significant venue for showing foreign blockbuster films, including the 1959 Ben Hur, which notably ran for six months, with significant demand for tickets. Through the 1960s and 1970s, the theater was widely considered the best in the country, and was even the only place one could watch a 70 mm wide screen until the 1980s. Other notable box office successes at the theater include the 1965 Sound of Music, the 1984 Killing Fields, and the 1987 The Last Emperor. In its heyday, the theater had 1,460,000 ticket sales a year.

By the mid-1990s, business was significantly slower for it and other historic one-screen theaters like Kukdo Theater and Dansungsa. The theater had a fond spot in the memory of many movie fans, which it attempted to appeal to by showing classic films like the 1965 Doctor Zhivago, but ticket sales only averaged around 100 per day. By this point, many felt that the theater would soon remodel in order to compete against the rise of other multiplex theaters at the time. The last film it showed before closing was the 1998 Chinese film Genghis Khan. The theater was demolished on May 21, 2000, after 45 years of continuous operation. The theater reopened on December 15, 2001, with eleven screens. The new facility offered shopping and dining in the same building.

== Gallery ==
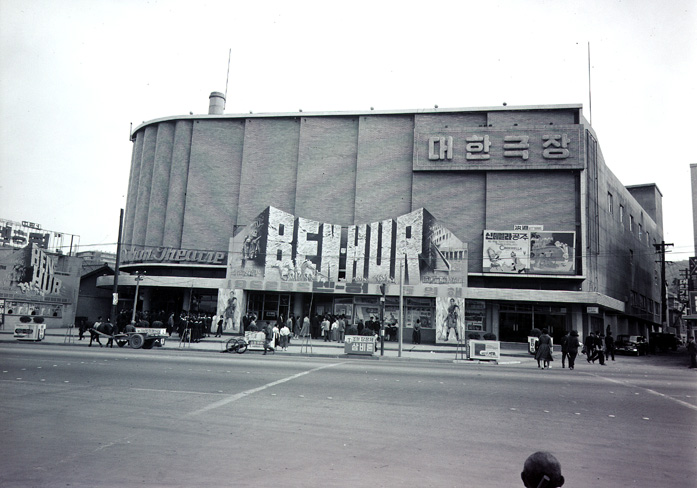
The theater in 1962

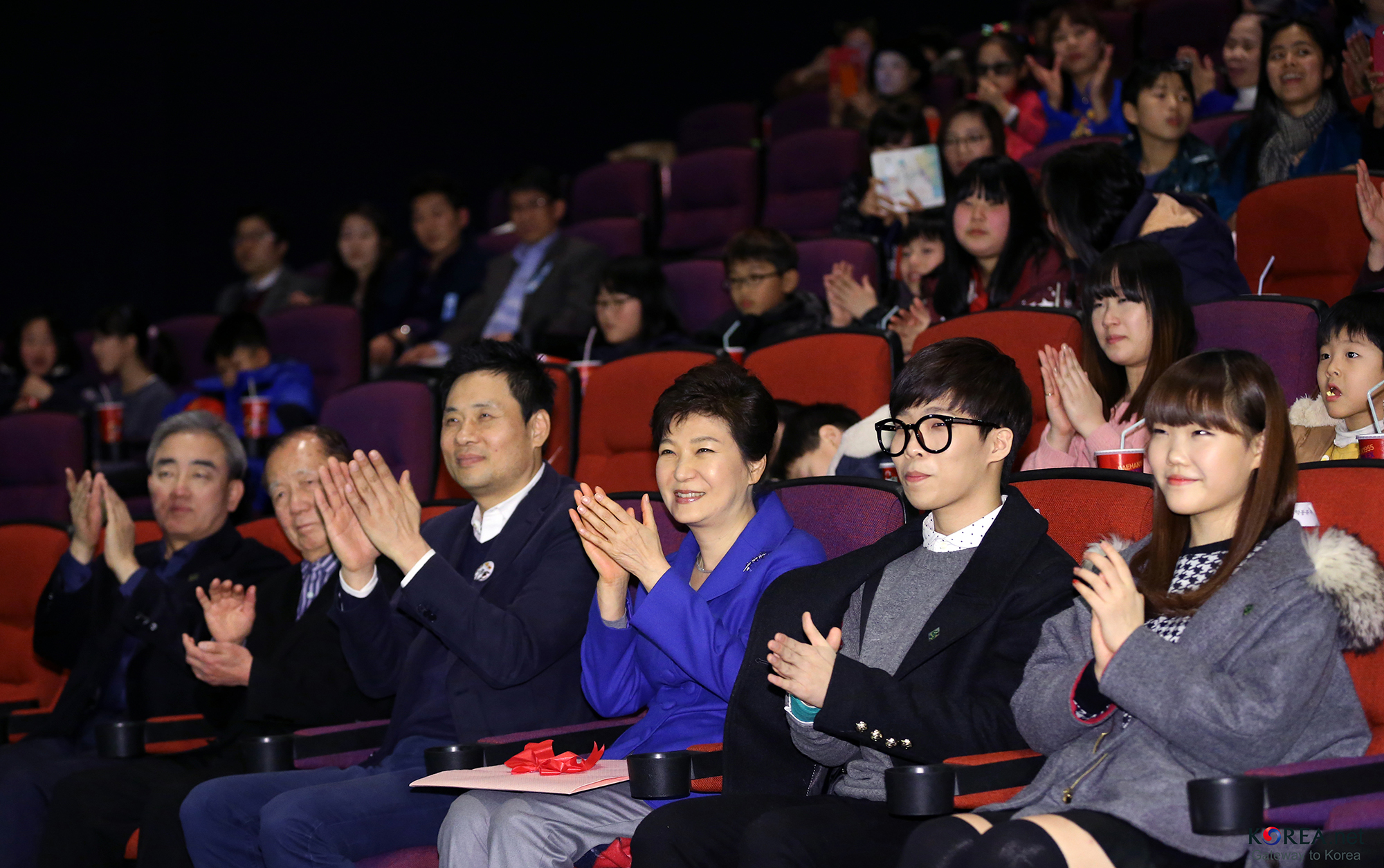
President Park Geun-hye (center, in blue) at the theater (2014)
