= Hyŏmnyulsa =

1902–1906 theater in Seoul, Korea

- Hangul: 협률사
- Hanja: 協律社
- RR: Hyeomnyulsa
- MR: Hyŏmnyulsa

Hyŏmnyulsa (Korean: 협률사) was among the earliest indoor theatres in Korea, and was supported by the Korean Empire from its opening in 1902 until its closing, around 1906.

Before 1902, Korean theatre took the forms of outdoor performance and folk theatre. In that year, Hyŏmnyulsa was established as the first modern indoor theatre in Korea, where they staged dramatized stories in Pansori musical styles. This reformed style of Pansori was a kind of opera or music drama called Changgeuk. Later, with strong financial support, it overpowered other private theatres and exercised great influence on other theatres.

== See also ==
- Ae Kwan Theater: now considered the first movie theater in the country (1895)
- Dansungsa: formerly considered to be the first movie theater (1907)
