= National Theater Company of Korea =

South Korean theatre company

Coordinates: 37°33′9″N 127°0′0″E

The National Theater Company of Korea (NTCK, Korean: 국립극단) is a South Korean theatre company founded in 1950 as an affiliate of the National Theater of Korea. In 2010, in its 60th anniversary year, NTCK separated from the National Theater of Korea and began to operate independently with two studio theater spaces in Seogye-dong, Seoul. NTCK resumed the use of Myeongdong Theater in 2015 which was its previous home venue for performances from 1957 to 1975.

== Productions ==
Since 1986, the 'World Classic Stage' has planned to introduce a series of classics and has performed 20 plays including Uncle Vanya, Le Bourgeois gentilhomme, The Robbers, Hamlet and the Terrorist.

In 2004, the NTCK launched the 'Restoration of the Representative Repertoires & Re-creation Series' project and has performed Thunderstorm, Attachment of Life, Wildfire, Spray, Merchant of Venice, Celebration at the Maeng Jin Sa.

== Performance venues ==
- Myeongdong Theater (558 seats)
- Baek Seonghui & Jang Minho Theater (190 seats)
- The Theater PAN (100 seats)

== See also ==
- National Theater of Korea
- Contemporary culture of South Korea
- Korean art
- Korean theater
