= National Orchestra Company of Korea =

South Korean orchestra

Coordinates: 37°33′9″N 127°0′0″E

National Orchestra of Korea (Korean: 국립국악관현악단) is a government-established orchestra of traditional Korean instruments. The orchestra was founded in 1995.

== See also ==
- National Theater of Korea
- Contemporary culture of South Korea
- Korean art
- Korean theater
- List of concert halls
