= National Theater of Korea =

Theater in Seoul, South Korea

Coordinates: 37°33′9″N 127°0′0″E

National Theatre of Korea
- 국립극장
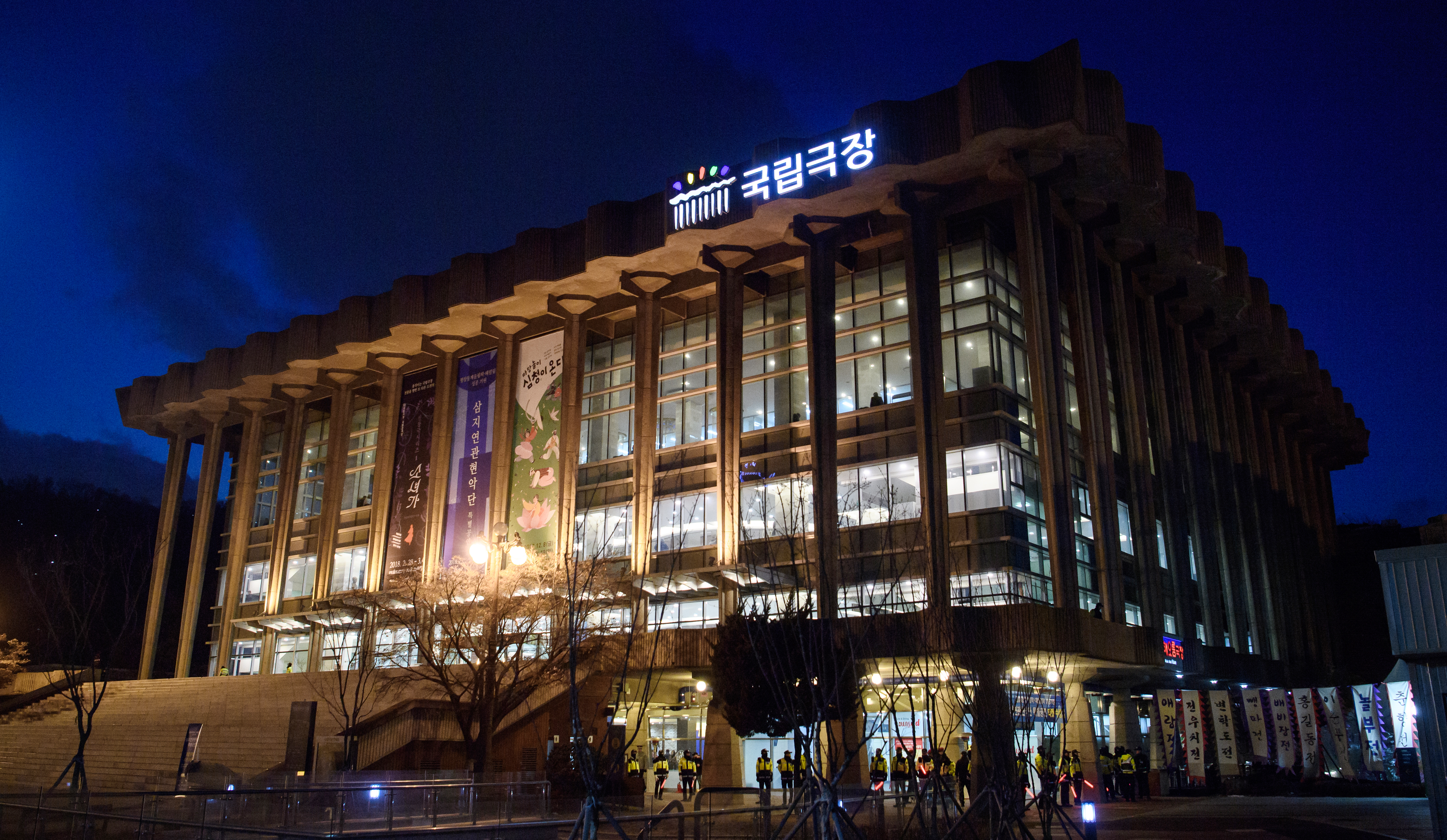
- Interactive map of National Theatre of Korea
- Address: Jangchung-dong, Jung-gu; Seoul; South Korea
- Owner: Shin Sun-hee
- Designation

Seoul Future Heritage
- Reference no.: 2013-027

Construction
- Opened: April 29, 1950

Website
- https://www.ntok.go.kr/ntok-en/main.do

Korean name
- Hangul: 국립극장
- Hanja: 國立劇場
- RR: Gungnip geukjang
- MR: Kungnip kŭkchang

The National Theater of Korea (Korean: 국립극장) is a national theatre located in the neighborhood of Jangchung-dong, Jung District, Seoul, South Korea. It is the first nationally managed theater in Asia.

== Affiliation ==
The National Theater of Korea was established in 1950 by the government of South Korea and hosts the National Theater Company of Korea, which performs both Korean and international plays, the National Changgeuk Company of Korea, which performs traditional Korean changgeuk, the National Dance Company of Korea, and the National Orchestra Company of Korea.

== Facilities ==
- Main Hall 'Haeoreum Grand Theater' (해; "sun")
- Small Hall 'Daloreum Theater' (달; "moon")
- Studio 'Byeol' (별; "star")
- KB Haneul Youth Theater (하늘; "sky")
- Culture Square

== Events ==
=== Youth Performing Arts Festival ===
The Youth Performing Arts Festival of the National Theater, held every April until May, is a festival for youth. With the theme 'Youth Embracing the Sky,' the festival contributes to fostering the positive emotions of youth through programs that allow the experience of traditional dance music, ↵musicals, mime, plays, and dances of Korean and international classics. In 2008, when the first festival was held, The Journey to Folksong with Suksun Ahn was performed for youth and multi-cultural families in culturally neglected areas. The Youth Performing Arts Festival is the signature event of the National Theater, intending to inspire those who will be the future leaders of society and the performing arts.

=== The World Festival of National Theaters ===
Starting in 2007, the World Festival of National Theaters takes place from September to October every year. The festival's stated goal is to promote the mutual understanding of cultures, allowing Korean audiences to see domestic and overseas performances. The National Theater of Korea's stated aim is to solidify its position as a center of performing arts in Korea. Performances representing national theaters of various nations are on stage together with additional events like shows and exhibitions. National theaters, embassies and cultural centers of various countries participate in the festival. The World Festival of National Theaters is the biggest festival hosted by the National Theater of Korea. It is considered by some to be one of the greatest festivals in Korea.

=== The Saturday Cultural Plaza ===
Since 1993, the Saturday Cultural Plaza has been the oldest open-air performance by the National Theater. Various concerts and performances, such as ballets, contemporary music concerts and orchestra concerts, are held in the open-air cultural plaza every May to September, on Saturdays at 6:00PM. So far, 350 thousand people have visited the Saturday Cultural Plaza. From 2002 to 2007, Renault-Samsung Motors sponsored the Plaza, and starting in 2008, KB Kookmin Bank sponsored it, which received the Mecenat Award in 2008. This activity aspires to serve as a partnership model between art and business.

=== Midday Concert ===
The Midday Concert was designed to show the potential of traditional classical music so the public can easily understand Korean music's past and present. The National Orchestra rearranged and modernised folksongs, contemporary music, and original soundtracks of soap↵operas and films. The artistic director, Byeongki Hwang, ↵ commented on each work to enrich the concert's content.

=== Seasons Festival ===
The National Theater of Korea provides various events every spring, summer, fall and winter.

== Shows ==
- 1966: Kim Ja-rim's magnum opus The Emigrant Ship premieres; it is the first play by a woman to be staged at the National Theater.^{:86-87}
- August 2010: Actors Lee Joon-gi and Ju Ji-hoon co-starred in the military musical, Voyage of Life. The musical, to commemorate the 60th anniversary of the Korean War, was co-produced by the Ministry of National Defense and the Korea Musical Theatre Association. It ran from 21 to 29 August at the Theater.
- January 2013: The Ministry of National Defense, in collaboration with the Korea Musical Theatre Association, produced another military musical, The Promise, to commemorate the 60th anniversary of the signing of an armistice. It ran from 9 to 20 January at the Theater, starring actors Ji Hyun-woo, Kim Mu-yeol, and Jung Tae-woo; as well as singers Leeteuk of Super Junior, Yoon Hak of Supernova, and Lee Hyun of 8Eight. The musical is centered on a group of soldiers who keep a promise made to each other during the 6.25 war.

== See also ==
- Contemporary culture of South Korea
- Korean art
- Korean theater
- List of concert halls
- Yuk Young-soo, First Lady of South Korea and spouse of Park Chung Hee – she was assassinated at the theater during a Gwangbokjeol (Independence Day) ceremony on August 15, 1974.
