= Golden Lake (Minnesota) =

Lake in the state of Minnesota, United States

- Location within Minnesota
- Location: Anoka County, Minnesota
- Coordinates: 45°8′19″N 93°9′10″W
- Type: lake
- Surface area: 57.2 acres (23.1 ha)
- Average depth: 8 feet (2.4 m)
- Max. depth: 24 feet (7.3 m)
- Website: https://www.dnr.state.mn.us/fishing/fin/kidsponds/golden.html

Golden Lake is a lake in Anoka County, Minnesota, in the United States.

Golden Lake was named for John Golden, the original owner of the land surrounding the lake.

== See also ==
- List of lakes in Minnesota
