= Ae Kwan Theater =

First movie theater in Korea

- The building in 2019
- Interactive map of the Ae Kwan Theater area
- Former names: Hyŏmnyulsa, Ch'ukhangsa

General information
- Location: 238 Gyeong-dong, Jemulpo District, South Korea
- Coordinates: 37.47227°N 126.62984°E
- Opened: 1895

Design and construction
- Known for: First movie theater in Korea

Website
- Official website (in Korean)

Korean name
- Hangul: 애관극장
- Hanja: 愛館劇場
- RR: Aegwan geukjang
- MR: Aegwan kŭkchang

Ae Kwan Theater (Korean: 애관극장) is a movie theater in Incheon, South Korea. It is believed to be the oldest movie theater in Korea, having been founded in 1895. It is believed to predate what was widely considered to be the first movie theater, Dansungsa, which was founded in 1907.

Ae Kwan is still in operation, although Dansungsa has since ceased. It is now owned by the AE KWAN Theater Co., Ltd.

The theater formerly went by the names Hyŏmnyulsa and Ch'ukhangsa.

== History ==
According to a book (《개항과 양관 역정》) from Choe Seong-yeon, the theater was first founded in 1895, during the First Sino-Japanese War, as Hyŏmnyulsa (협률사; 協律舍; Hyeomnyulsa, not to be confused with Hyŏmnyulsa, which has a different final Hanja character). In 1912, it changed its name to Ch'ukhangsa (축항사; 築港舍; Chukhangsa). In 1921, it again changed its name to Ae Kwan (애관; 愛館; Aegwan), and renovated on October 10, 1927.

== See also ==
- Cinema of Korea
- Cinema of South Korea
- Korean Film Museum
- Korean Film Archive
