= Chungmuro station =

Train station in Seoul, South Korea

| 충무로; Chungmuro |
| 충무로; Chungmuro |
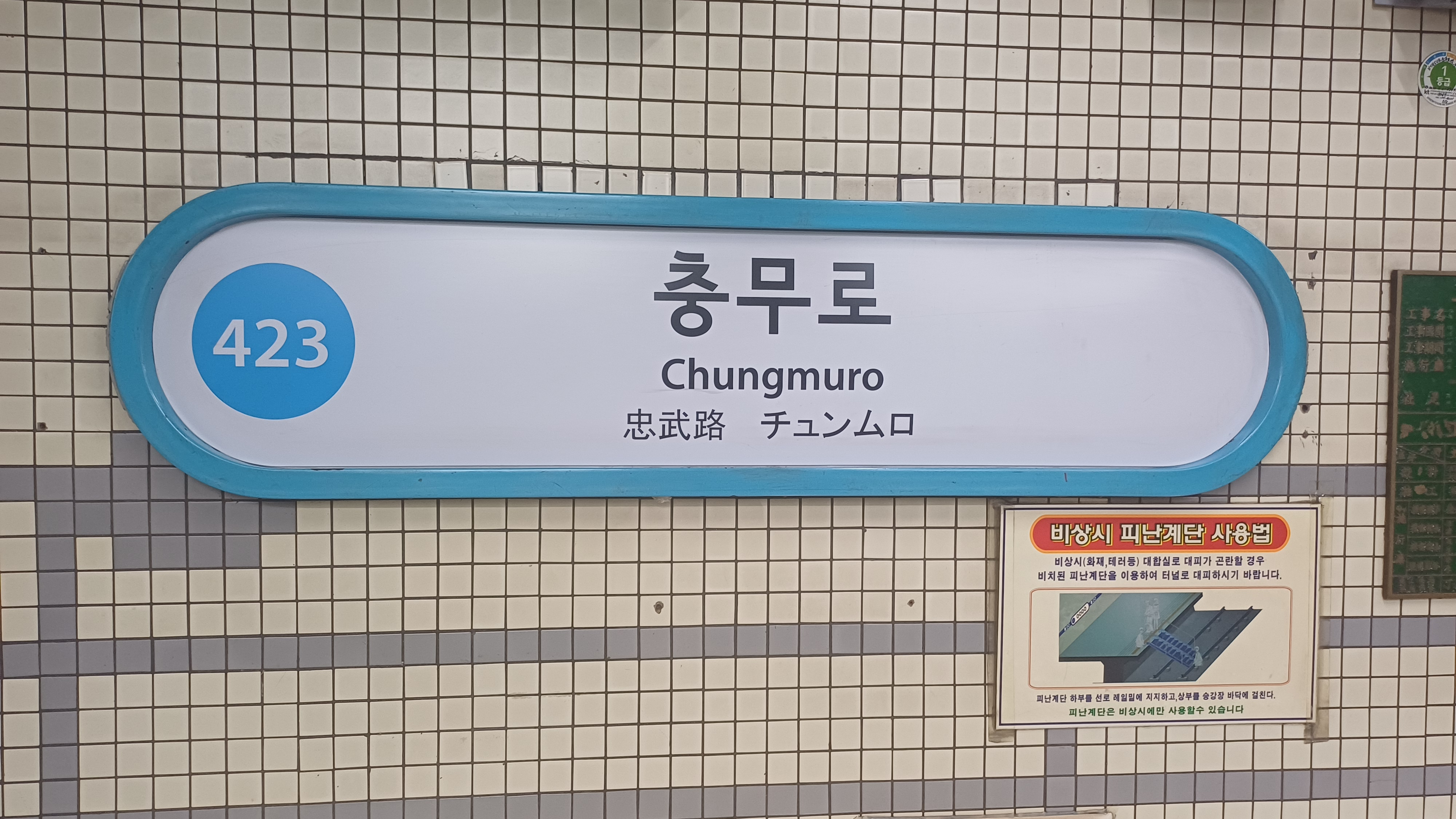
- Line 4 station nameplate

Korean name
- Hangul: 충무로역
- Hanja: 忠武路驛
- Revised Romanization: Chungmuro-yeok
- McCune–Reischauer: Ch'ungmuro-yŏk

General information
- Location: 125 Chungmuro 4-ga,199 Toigye-ro Jiha; Jung District, Seoul
- Coordinates: 37°33′40.7″N 126°59′40.2″E
- Operator: Seoul Metro
- Lines: Line 3 Line 4
- Platforms: 3
- Tracks: 4

Construction
- Structure type: Underground

Key dates
- October 18, 1985: Line 3 opened
- October 18, 1985: Line 4 opened
Location

Chungmuro Station is a station on Line 3 and Line 4 of the Seoul Subway system. Platforms for both Line 3 and Line 4 are located in Chungmuro-4-ga, Jung District, Seoul.

This station is named after the road under which it passes, in honor of the Chosun general Yi Sunsin, who was also known by the title of Chungmugong.

== Station layout ==
| G | Street level | Exit |

| L1; Concourse | Lobby | Customer Service, Shops, Vending machines, ATMs |

| L2; Line 3 platforms | Northbound | ← Line 3 toward Daehwa (Euljiro 3 (sam)-ga) |
| L2; Line 3 platforms | Island platform, doors will open on the left |
| L2; Line 3 platforms | Southbound | Line 3 toward Ogeum (Dongguk Univ.) → |

| L3; Line 4 platforms | Side platform, doors will open on the right |
| L3; Line 4 platforms | Northbound | ← Line 4 toward Jinjeop (Dongdaemun History & Culture Park) |
| L3; Line 4 platforms | Southbound | Line 4 toward Oido (Myeong-dong) → |
| L3; Line 4 platforms | Side platform, doors will open on the right |

== Cinema ==
Chungmuro is considered the best place to view Korean movies. Just outside the exit by the rear entrance to Dongguk University is Daehan Cinema, where Chungmuro Film Festival in Seoul was first held.

== Gallery ==
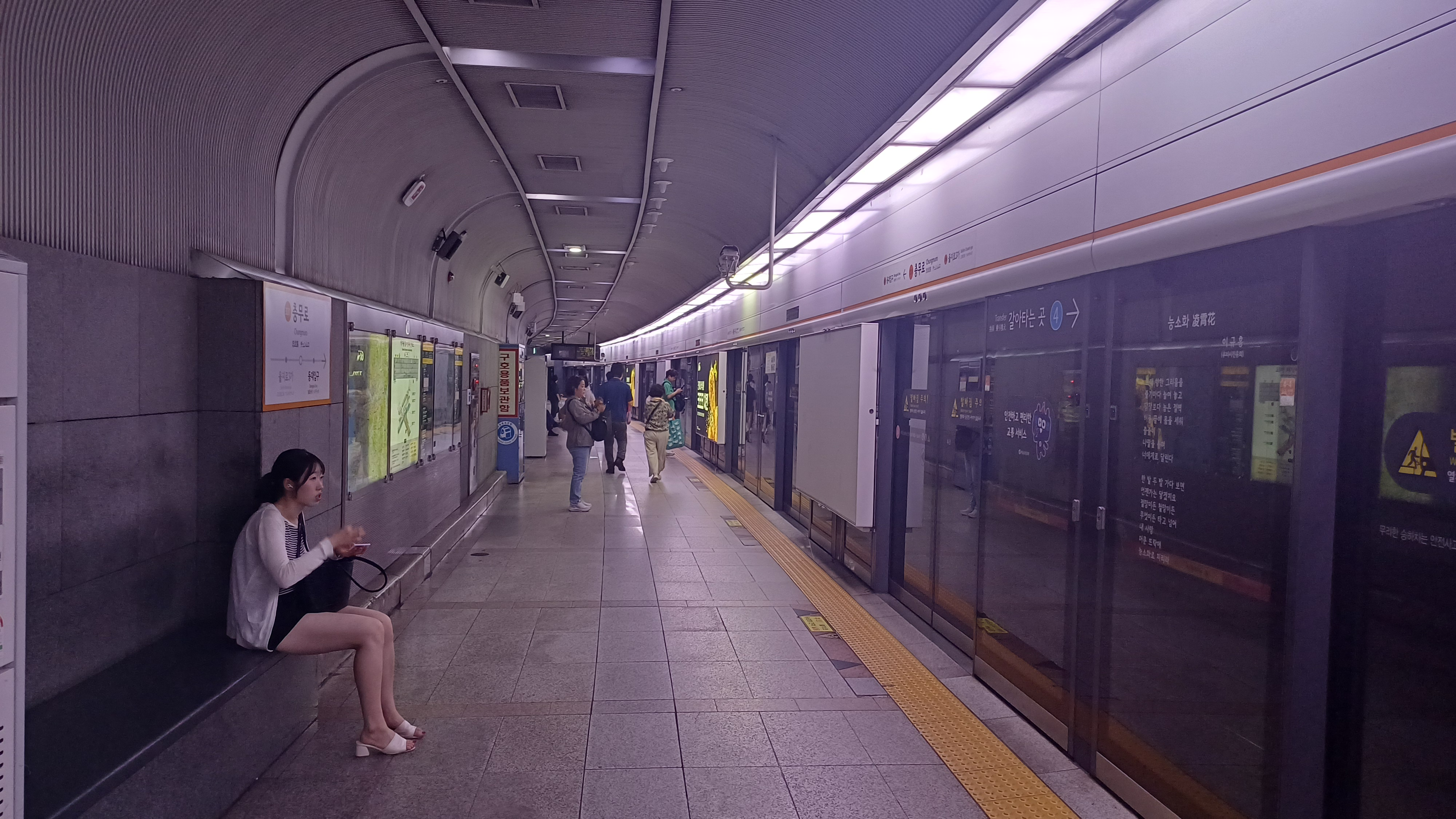
Line 3 platform

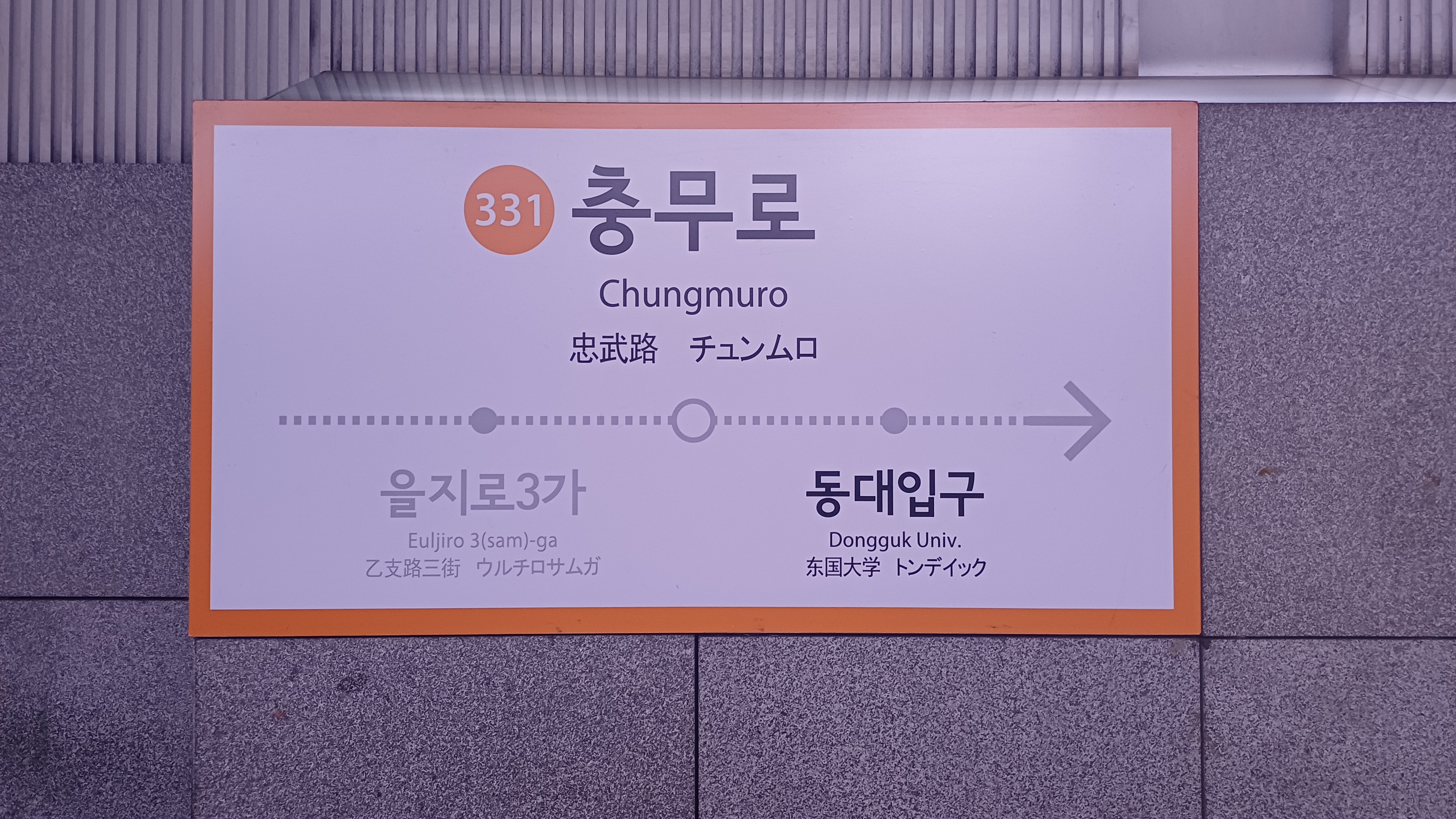
Line 3 station nameplate

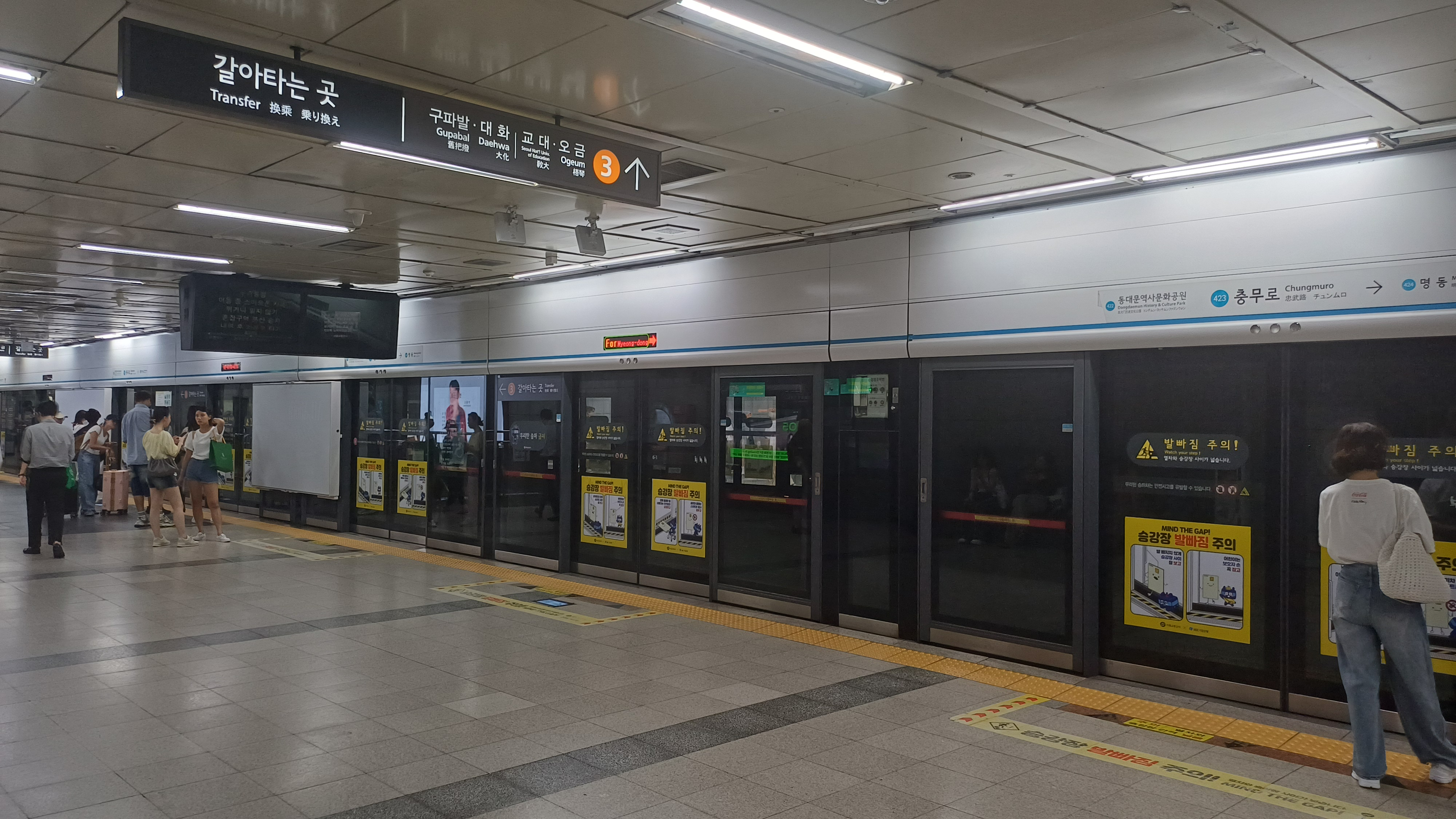
Line 4 platform

| Preceding station | Seoul Metropolitan Subway | Following station |
|---|---|---|
| Euljiro 3(sam)-ga towards Daehwa | Line 3 | Dongguk University towards Ogeum |
| Dongdaemun History & Culture Park towards Jinjeop | Line 4 | Myeong-dong towards Oido |
