= Geumho station =

Railway station in Seoul, South Korea

금호; Geumho
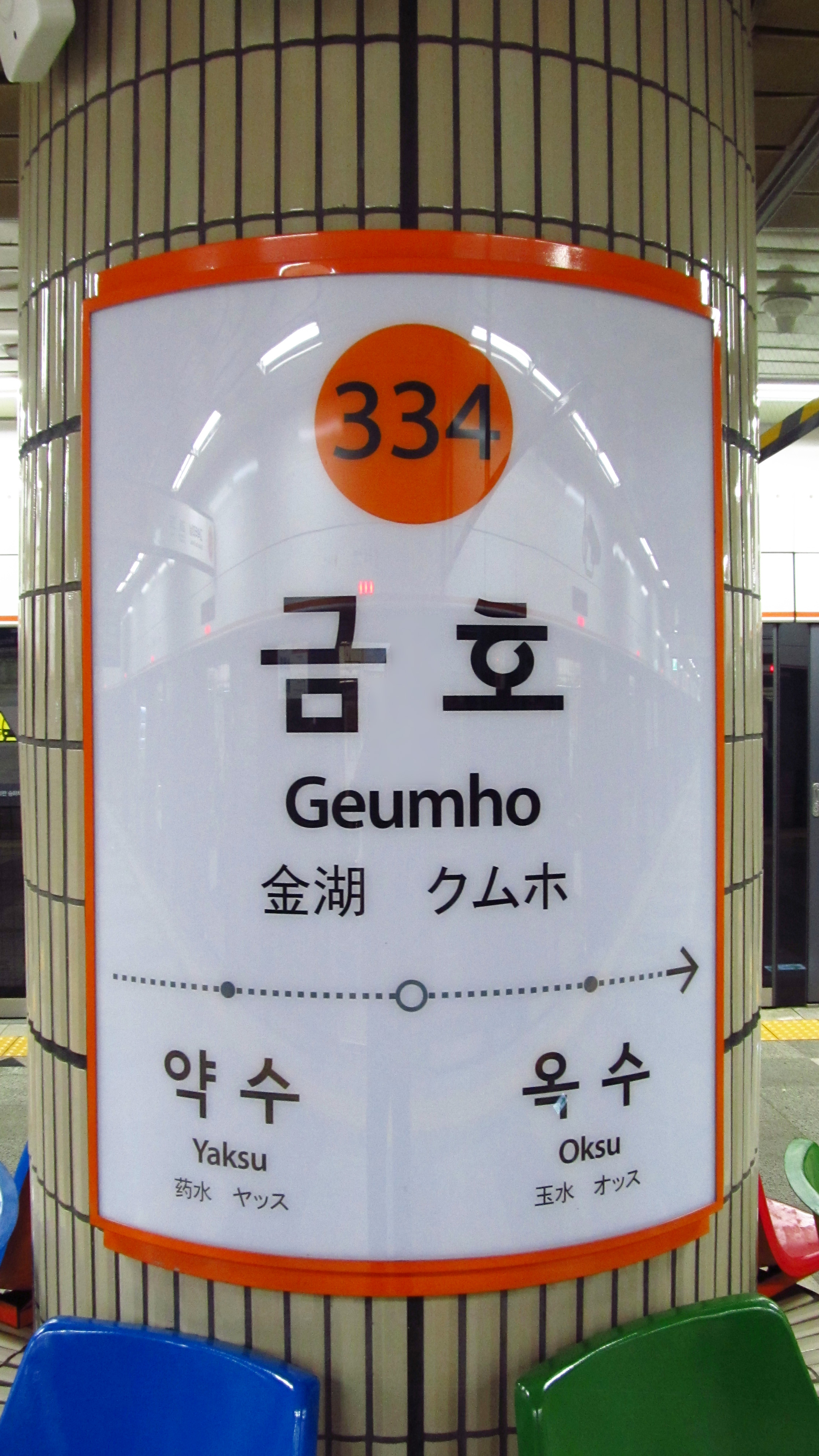
- Station Sign

Korean name
- Hangul: 금호역
- Hanja: 金湖驛
- Revised Romanization: Geumho-yeok
- McCune–Reischauer: Kŭmho-yŏk

General information
- Location: 104 Dongho-ro Jiha, 1470 Geumho-dong 4-ga, Seongdong-gu, Seoul
- Coordinates: 37°32′53″N 127°00′58″E
- Operator: Seoul Metro
- Line: Line 3
- Platforms: 1
- Tracks: 2

Construction
- Structure type: Underground

Key dates
- October 18, 1985: Line 3 opened

Passengers
- (Daily) Based on Jan–Dec 2012; Line 3: 16,500
Location

Geumho Station (Korean: 금호역) is a station on the Seoul Subway Line 3 in Seongdong District, Seoul, South Korea. The name of the station literally means "golden lake", although there is no lake to be found today in the neighborhood of this station. The short piece of road under which this station is built is situated between two consecutive road tunnels nearby.

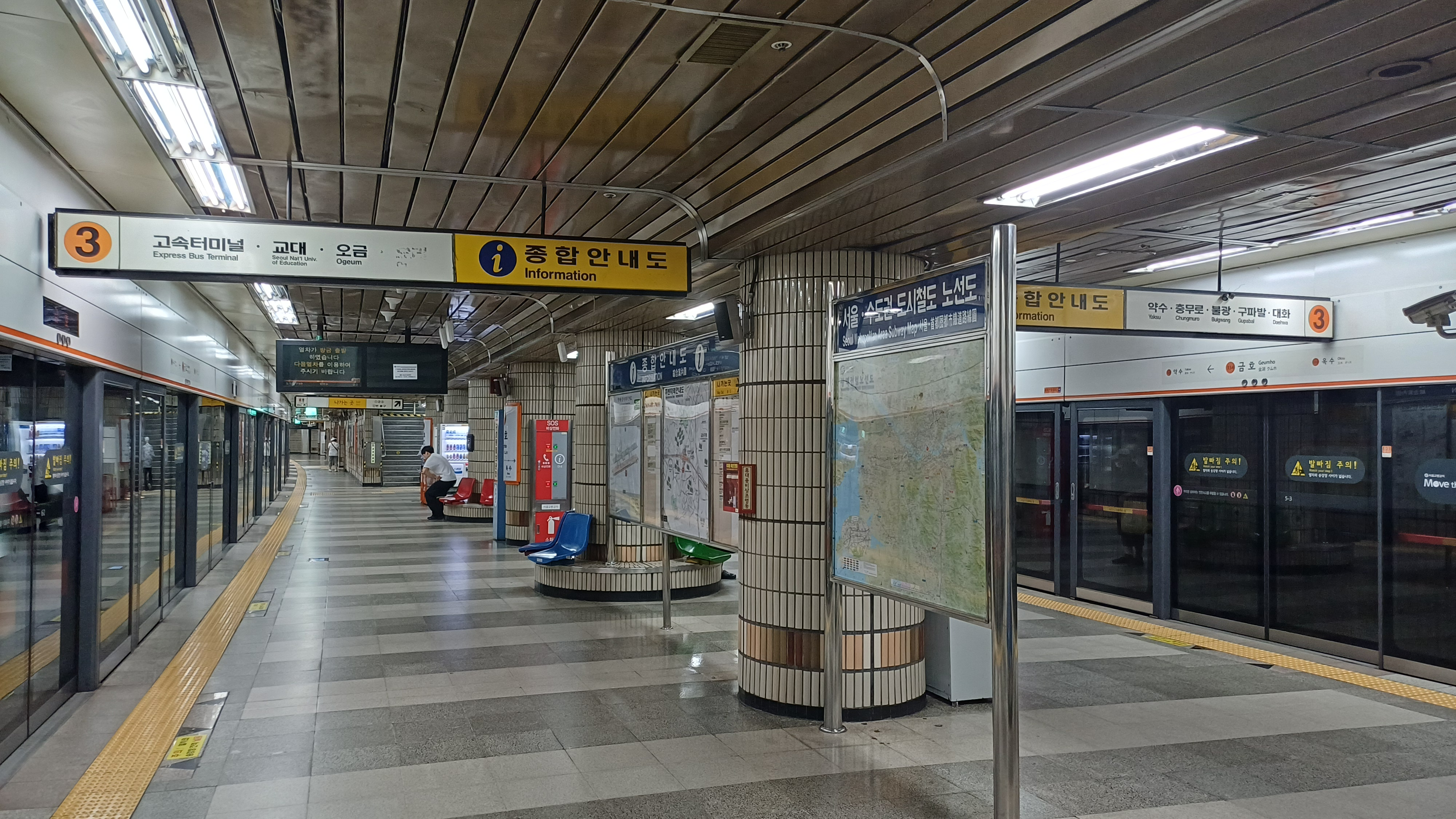
Station platform

== Station layout ==
G	Street level	Exit

L1; Concourse	Lobby	Customer Service, Shops, Vending machines, ATMs

L2; Platform	Northbound	← Line 3 toward Daehwa (Yaksu)
L2; Platform	Island platform, doors will open on the left
L2; Platform	Southbound	Line 3 toward Ogeum (Oksu) →

== Vicinity ==
- Exit 1 : Dusan APT, Geumho Park
- Exit 2 : Geumho samgeori (3-way intersection)
- Exit 3 : Geumok Elementary School
- Exit 4 : Oksu Tunnel
- Exit 5 : Geumho Tunnel

Preceding station	Seoul Metropolitan Subway	Following station
Yaksu towards Daehwa	Line 3	Oksu towards Ogeum
