= Jangchung-dong =

Neighborhood in Seoul, South Korea

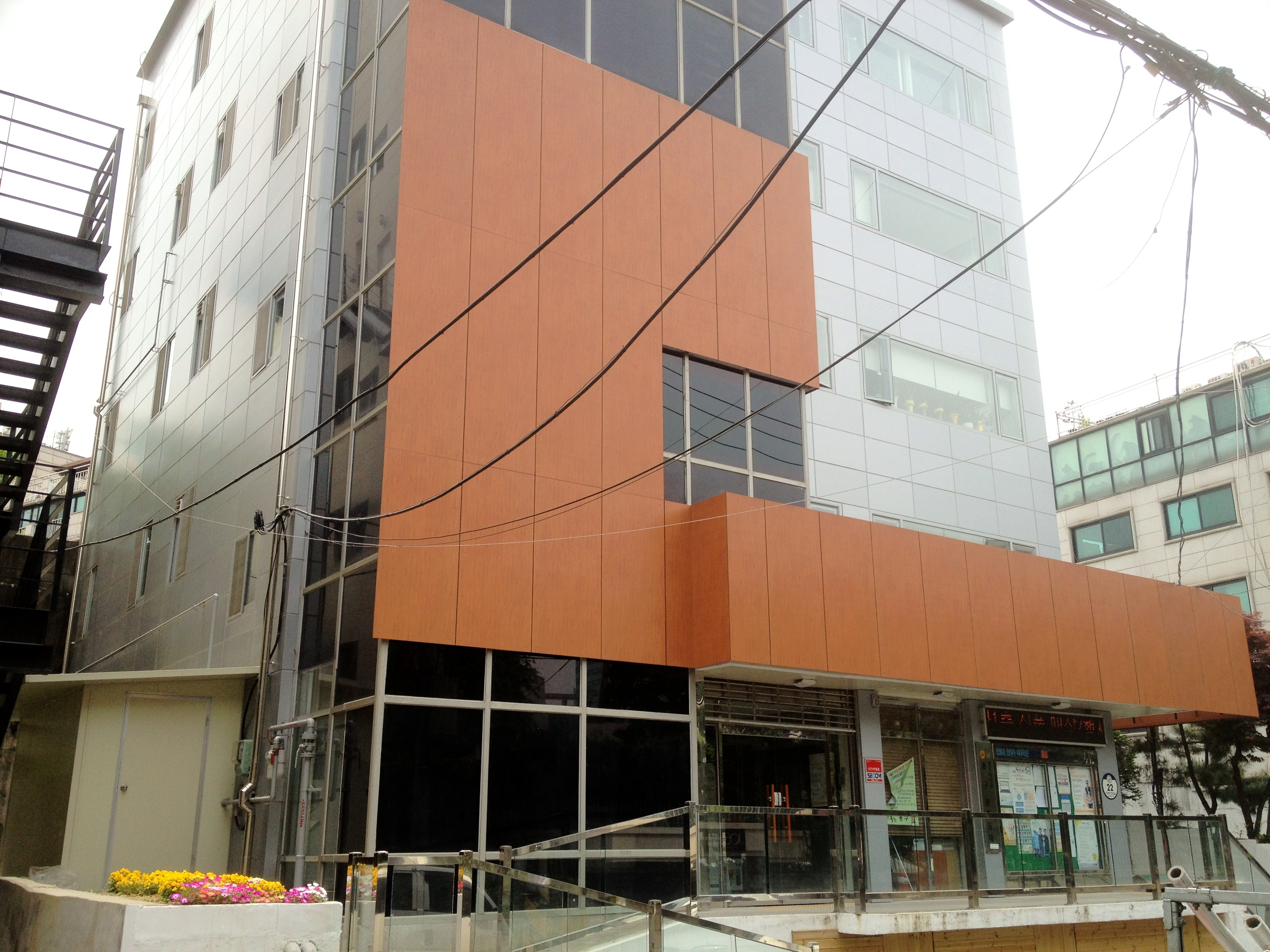
- Jangchung-dong Jokbal Alley Jangchung-dong Resident Office

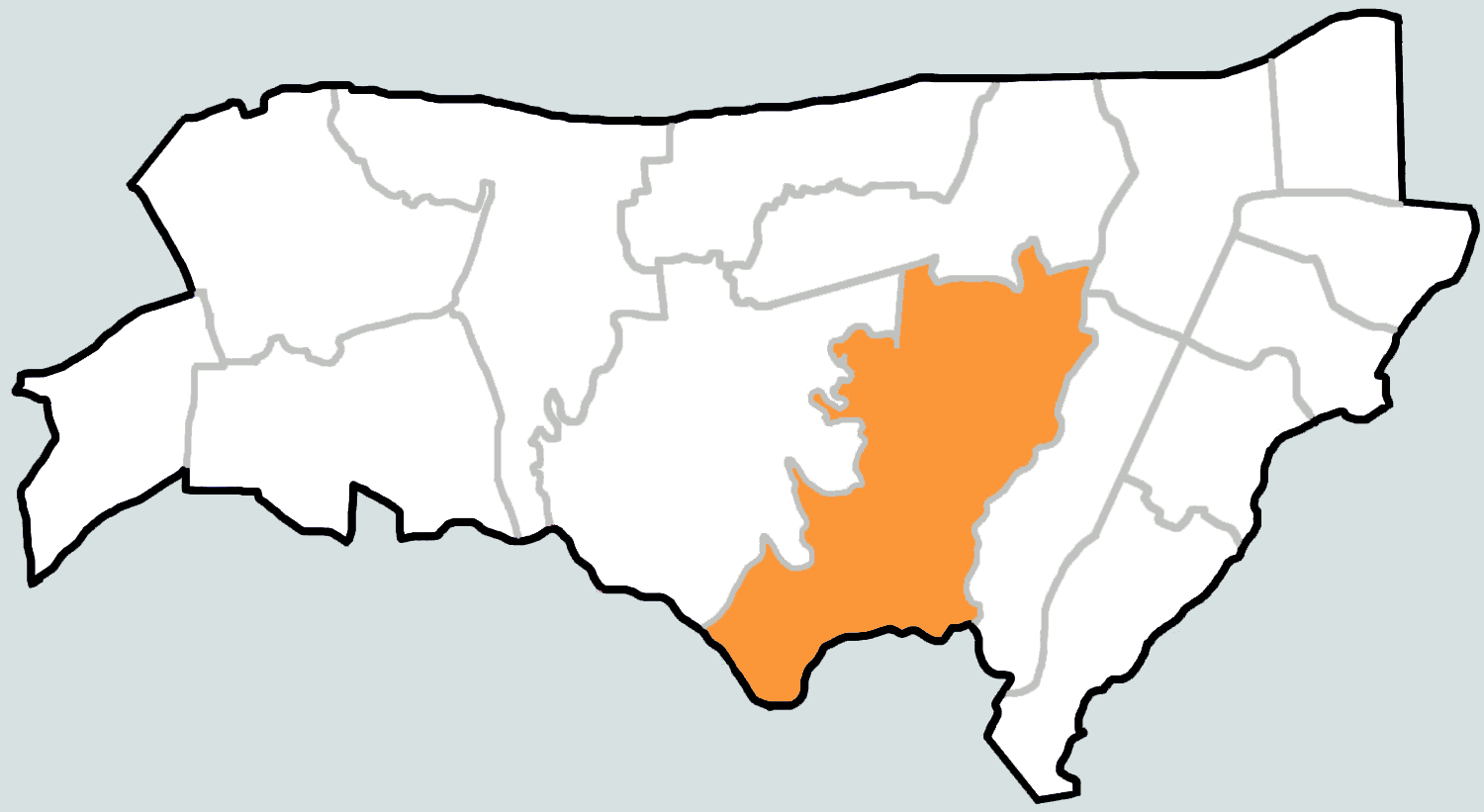
- Country: South Korea

Area
  - Total: 1.36 km^{2} (0.53 sq mi)

Population (2013)
  - Total: 5,622
  - Density: 4,130/km^{2} (10,700/sq mi)

Korean name
- Hangul: 장충동
- Hanja: 奬忠洞
- RR: Jangchung-dong
- MR: Changch'ung-dong

Jangchung-dong (Korean: 장충동) is a dong (neighborhood) of Jung District, Seoul, South Korea.

== Etymology ==
The name Jangchung-dong originated from the Jangchungdan that was located in this area. Established in 1900, Jangchungdan was a place where ceremonies honoring loyal subjects and martyrs who sacrificed their lives for the country during the Eulmi Incident (the assassination of Empress Myeongseong) were held. On 1 October 1946, during the process of changing the Japanese-style neighborhood names to ones with deep Korean roots, this entire area was named 'Jangchung-dong'.

== Attractions ==
- National Theater of Korea
- Jangchung Gymnasium
- Grand Ambassador Seoul hotel
- Jangchung (장충단 奬忠壇)
- Jangchungdan Park (장충단공원 奬忠壇公園)
- The Advisory on Democratic Peaceful Unification (민주평화통일자문회의 民主平和統一諮問會議)
- Korea Freedom League (한국자유총연맹 韓國自由總聯盟)
- Freedom Center (자유센터), building for Korea Freedom League
- Kyungdong Presbyterian Church (경동교회)
- Banyan Tree Club and Spa (반얀트리 클럽&스파)
- Shilla Hotel

== Transportation ==
- Dongguk University Station of

== See also ==
- Administrative divisions of South Korea
