= Golden Lake (Nova Scotia) =

Lake in Nova Scotia, Canada

- Location within Nova Scotia
- Location: Halifax, Nova Scotia
- Coordinates: 44°52′44.9″N 63°38′29″W
- Basin countries: Canada

Golden Lake is a lake in Halifax, Nova Scotia, Canada.

== See also ==
- List of lakes in Nova Scotia
