= Chungmu-ro =

Street in Seoul, South Korea

Coordinates: 37°33′41″N 126°59′36″E

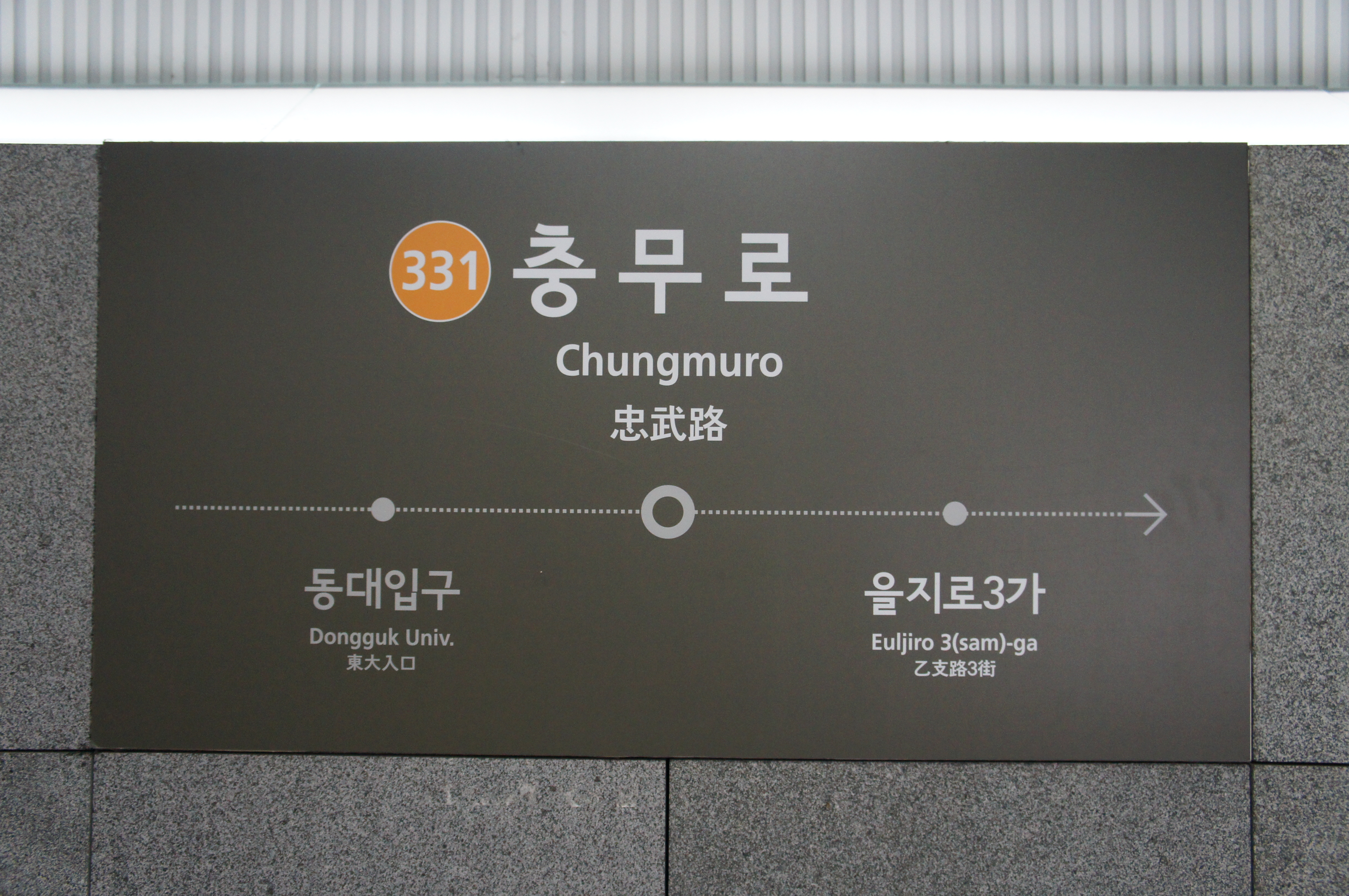
- Chungmuro station

Korean name
- Hangul: 충무로
- Hanja: 忠武路
- RR: Chungmuro
- MR: Ch'ungmuro

Chungmuro (Korean: 충무로) is an avenue 1.75 km (1.09 mi) in length and 10 to 20 m (33 to 66 ft) in width and the area nearby, located in Jung District, Seoul, South Korea. Since the 1960s, Chungmuro has been known as the street of culture, artists, and the film industry. Dansungsa, the first movie theater of Korea, established in 1907, is also situated in the area, then known by its Japanese name, Honmachi. Since 1974, Jongno 3(sam)-ga station has become the nearest station around. Chungmuro was named after Chungmugong, the posthumous title of Korean Admiral Yi Sun-shin, which means "martial duke of loyalty." The last syllable "ro" refers to road in Korean.

== History ==
During Japanese rule in Korea, Chungmuro was known as "Honmachi".

Although many film studios have since moved from Chungmuro to the Gangnam District or other areas of Seoul, Chungmuro still symbolizes the South Korean film industry and continues to be used as a metonym for it.

== See also ==
- Chungmuro station
- Cinema of South Korea
- Cinema of Korea
