= Changgeuk =

Genre of Korean opera

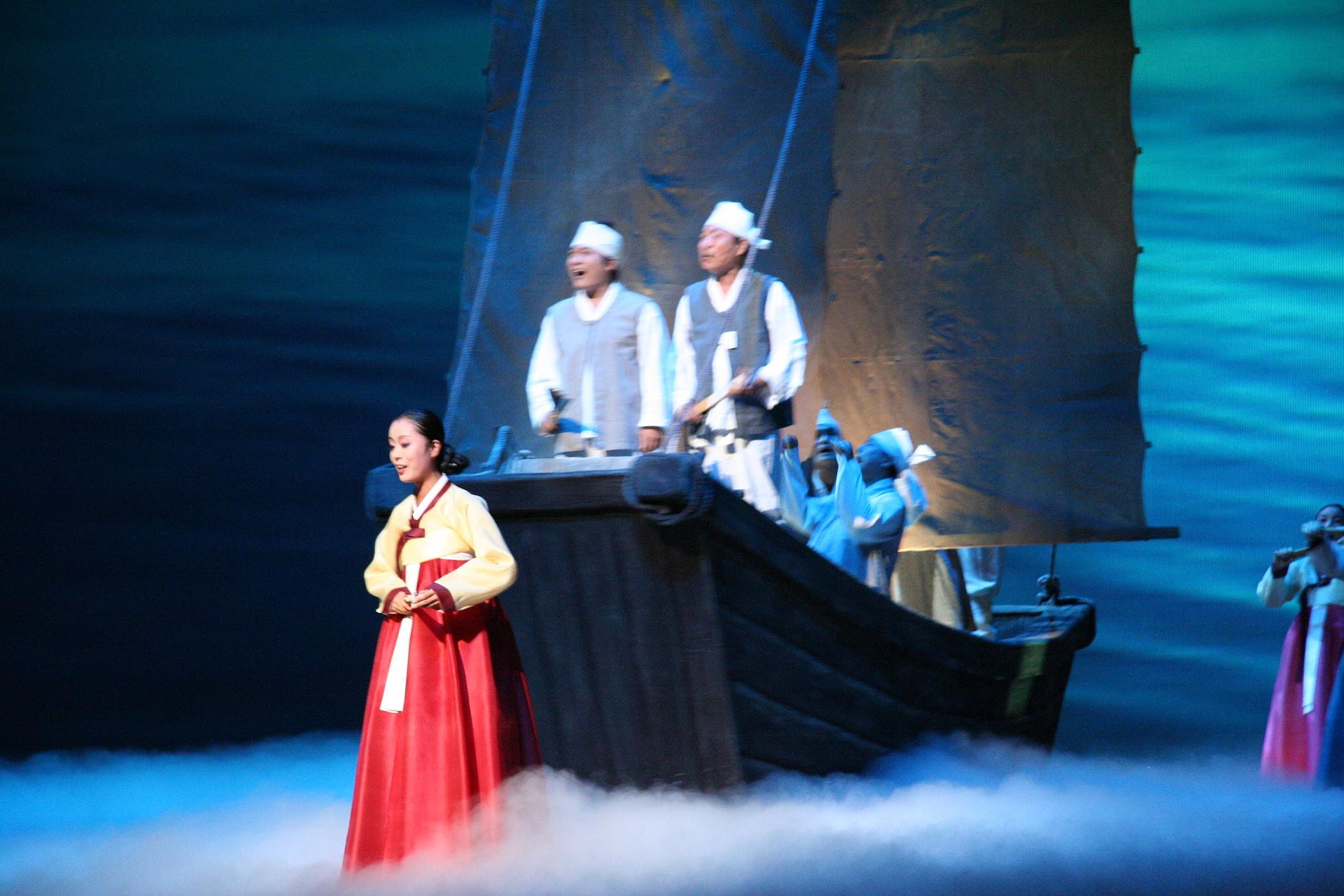
- A performance of the changgeuk titled "Leaving Ship" (떠나가는 배)

Korean name
- Hangul: 창극
- Hanja: 唱劇
- RR: changgeuk
- MR: ch'anggŭk

Changgeuk (Korean: 창극) or ch'angguk is a genre of traditional Korean opera, performed as a play but in the Korean folk song style known as pansori. Shamanic songs are the ultimate origin of Pansori as well. There are many similarities between Pansori and Shamanic songs of western Korea. Pansori began as a recognized form of entertainment in Korea dating back to the 17th century, however, it wasn’t popular until towards the 19th century. In the 20th century, it declined in popularity, just like Talchum, during the occupation of the Japanese while Korea fought for its independence.

Pansori almost completely vanished by the 1960’s. Since the 1970’s, there has been quite an increase of interest among scholars and the people, which helped Pansori gain popularity again. In Korean, "chang" means pansori and "geuk" means drama. Changgeuk represents a fusion of pansori and Western theater/drama, drawing upon elements of both traditions to create a unique and dynamic form of musical theater that reflects Korea's cultural heritage while also embracing global influences. It maintains the narrative storytelling aspect of pansori and incorporates Western storytelling techniques. Changgeuk productions typically involve a large cast of performers who take on the roles of different characters in the story. They combine traditional Korean instruments like the buk (drum) and gayageum (zither) with Western instruments such as the violin and piano, and they make use of elaborate sets, costumes, props, and staging techniques to create the world of the story and enhance the storytelling experience. Korean theater dates back to 1000 BCE, as spectacularly dressed Shamans danced to draw in spirits. These Korean Shamans, were people said to have powers from a trance or extreme religious experience.

The word Shaman literally comes from the words “The one who knows”. The first Korean theater became known during the time that was known as “The Three Kingdoms.” During The Japanese Empire Changgeuk Wasn’t practiced Leading to the traditional way Lost in history.

== History and Evolution ==
During the 17th century, Korea became increasingly isolationist and transformed into a hermit kingdom, cut off from the rest of the world. This era of isolationism, sometimes referred to as the "Closed Door Policy," lasted until the turn of the 20th century. After Korea opened its doors to foreign countries, new forms of entertainment - such as Japanese shinpa, or new wave, theater, and modern Western drama - were introduced and started to gain popularity, meanwhile the popularity of traditional pansori began to decline. Subsequently, changgeuk emerged. 1908 officially marked the beginning of modern Korean musical theater with the first changgeuk performance, a work titled "The Silver World" ("Eunsegye"). When it was first introduced, however, changgeuk failed to flourish due to a lack of creative materials, among other reasons, and it languished in obscurity for a long time. In the past few years, some notable changes have occurred which has led to the revival of changgeuk. At the center of this renaissance is the National Changgeuk Company of Korea, established in 1962 as a troupe of the National Theater of Korea. The Company has produced a series of creative works featuring fresh interpretations and stylish stage settings that has catapulted changgeuk into the national spotlight. The Company operates around three key initiatives: first, recreating the five surviving stories of pansori (including Shimcheong-ga, Chunhyang-ga, Heungbo-ga, Sugung-ga, and Jeokbyeok-ga) into changgeuk; second, updating the seven pansori classics that have been partially handed down (e.g., Byeon Gangsoe Taryeong, Baebijang Taryeong, Byeongangsoe-ga) into changgeuk; and third, adapting foreign classical plays into changgeuk. The Company also launched the "Changgeuk of World Master's Choice" program, which invited prominent theater directors from overseas to reinterpret changgeuk works in new ways. The Company's efforts have been successful and received enthusiastic responses from contemporary audiences.

== See also ==
- Pansori
- Korean music
- Korean theatre
- National Changgeuk Company of Korea
