= Theater in Korea =

Koreans have held performances for others since antiquity. The character of these performances has changed over time.

== History ==
=== Silla ===
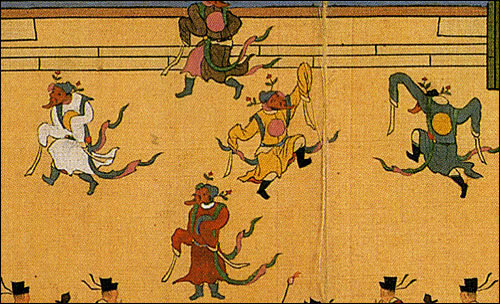
Choeyongmu

Silla unified the three kingdoms in the late 7th century and collected the music of Gaya, Baekje, and Goguryeo together, most of which were handed down to later generations as Silla music. Cheoyongmu, a Silla royal dance performance, is still performed today. It was originally a dance that was performed to drive away evil spirits from the annual royal court.

=== Joseon ===
==== Pansori ====
Pansori is a genre of musical storytelling. The origin of pansori was around the time of King Sukjong's reign. Pansori developed mostly in southern-central Korea, and many of its performers were from Jeolla Province. On 24 December 1964, it was designated as an Intangible Cultural Heritage of South Korea No. 5, and on 7 November 2003, it was classified by UNESCO as an intangible heritage.

==== Folk drama ====
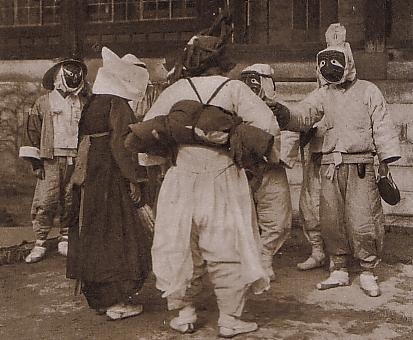
Korean folk drama

Folk dramas (민속극) were also popular. One theory holds that they developed from religious rituals, such as farming rituals and funerals. Folk puppet plays, shadow plays, and pansori also featured in folk dramas.

Masked dramas include Yangju byeolsandae nori and Songpasandae-nori, a talchum popularized in the 19th century.

=== Modern era ===
Before the 20th century there were few scripted plot-driven drama plays; stories were handed down orally for generations. Performative presentations, including dance, shamanic rituals, and circuses, were called noreum (놀음) or yeonhui (연희; lit. 'playing'). Until the 19th century, the two leading forms of Korean public theater were talchum and pansori.

==== New theater ====
The establishment of the theater impacted how modern plays were performed. Previously, plays were performed in outdoor courtyards. Performances were also traditionally held outdoors, in places like palace courtyards. But after Korea ended its isolationism, the first modern indoor theater Hyopyul-sa was built in 1902. 'New Theater' (신극), which involved performances of Western plays or Western-style plays, became popular.

In 1902 the first theater, Hyopyul-sa, was established to celebrate the 40th anniversary of Emperor Gojong's ascension. Hyopyulsa was an exclusive organization, with 170 performers in various fields from all over the country. It initially did private performances, but eventually performed public ones.

In July 1908 Hyeopryulsa was reopened as a private rental theater called Wongaksa. It was led by Lee Dong-baek and had 64 performers, including 40 men and 24 women. Its output was called "New Theater" (신연극). One example of a New Theater production was Yi Injik's "Eun Segye", which opened in November 1908 and performed at Wongaksa.

==== Early soap opera ====
The Changgeuk Movement, which was centered on Wongaksa Temple, was pushed back to the provinces and the Sinpa Theater filled the place. They built theaters such as Sujwa, and the large-scale opera troupes flowed in. They performed a number of plays with themes of Korean independence activist sentiment.

== See also ==
- Hyopyul-sa
- National Theater of Korea
- Jump (comic martial-arts performance)
