= Cinema of South Korea =

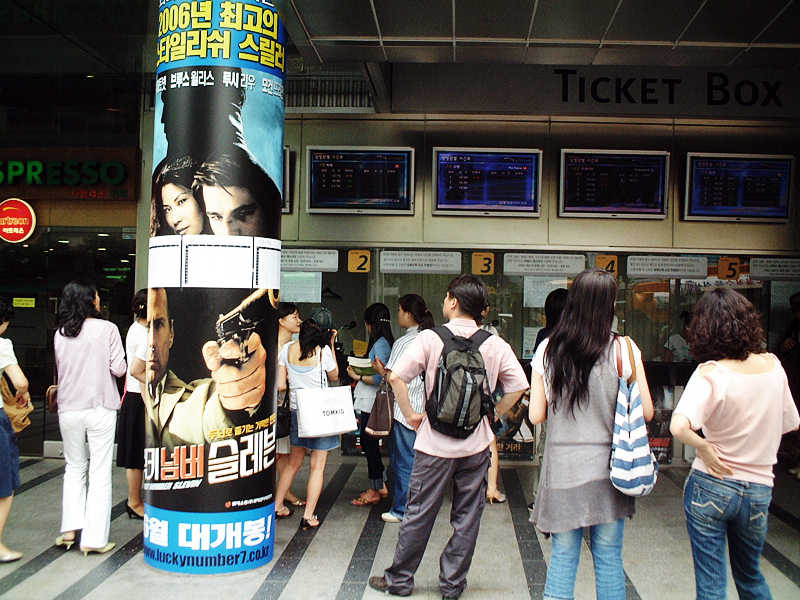
- Movie theater in Sincheon
- No. of screens: 3475 (2024)
  - Per capita: 5.3 per 100,000 (2015)
- Main distributors: CJ E&M (21%); NEW (18%); Lotte (15%)

Produced feature films (2015)
- Total: 269

Number of admissions (2015)
- Total: 217,300,000
- National films: 113,430,600 (52%)

Gross box office (2015)
- Total: ₩1.59 trillion
- National films: ₩830 billion (52%)

South Korean films have been heavily influenced by such events and forces as the Korea under Japanese rule, the Korean War, government censorship, the business sector, globalization, and the democratization of South Korea.

The golden age of South Korean cinema in the mid-20th century produced what are considered two of the best South Korean films of all time, The Housemaid (1960) and Obaltan (1961), while the industry's revival with the Korean New Wave from the late 1990s to the present produced both of the country's highest-grossing films, The Admiral: Roaring Currents (2014) and Extreme Job (2019), as well as prize winners on the festival circuit including Golden Lion recipient Pietà (2012) and Palme d'Or recipient and Academy Award winner Parasite (2019) and international cult classics including Oldboy (2003), Snowpiercer (2013), and Train to Busan (2016).

With the increasing global success and globalization of the Korean film industry, the past two decades have seen Korean actors like Lee Byung-hun and Bae Doona star in American films, Korean auteurs such as Park Chan-wook and Bong Joon-ho direct English-language works, Korean American actors crossover to star in Korean films as with Steven Yeun and Ma Dong-seok, and Korean films be remade in the United States, China, and other markets. The Busan International Film Festival has also grown to become Asia's largest and most important film festival.

American film studios have also set up local subsidiaries like Warner Bros. Korea and 20th Century Fox Korea to finance Korean films like The Age of Shadows (2016) and The Wailing (2016), putting them in direct competition with Korea's Big Four vertically integrated domestic film production and distribution companies: Lotte Cultureworks (formerly Lotte Entertainment), CJ Entertainment, Next Entertainment World (NEW), and Showbox. Netflix has also entered Korea as a film producer and distributor as part of both its international growth strategy in search of new markets and its drive to find new content for consumers in the U.S. market amid the "streaming wars" with Disney, which has a Korean subsidiary, and other competitors.

== History ==
The earliest movie theaters in the country opened during the late Joseon to Korean Empire periods. The first was Ae Kwan Theater, followed by Dansungsa.

=== Liberation and war (1945–1953) ===
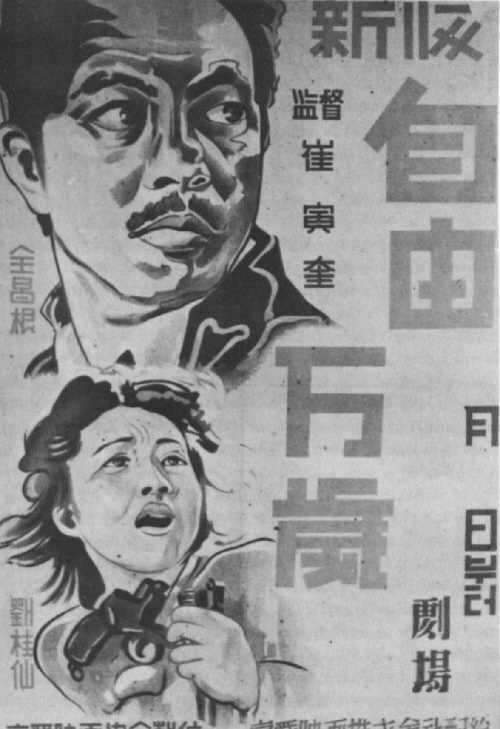
Poster for Viva Freedom! (1946)

With the surrender of Japan in 1945 and the subsequent liberation of Korea, freedom became the predominant theme in South Korean cinema in the late 1940s and early 1950s. One of the most significant films from this era is director Choi In-gyu's Viva Freedom! (1946), which is notable for depicting the Korean independence movement. The film was a major commercial success because it tapped into the public's excitement about the country's recent liberation.

However, during the Korean War, the South Korean film industry stagnated, and only 14 films were produced from 1950 to 1953. All of the films from that era have since been lost. Following the Korean War armistice in 1953, South Korean president Syngman Rhee attempted to rejuvenate the film industry by exempting it from taxation. Additionally foreign aid arrived in the country after the war that provided South Korean filmmakers with equipment and technology to begin producing more films.

=== Golden age (1955–1972) ===
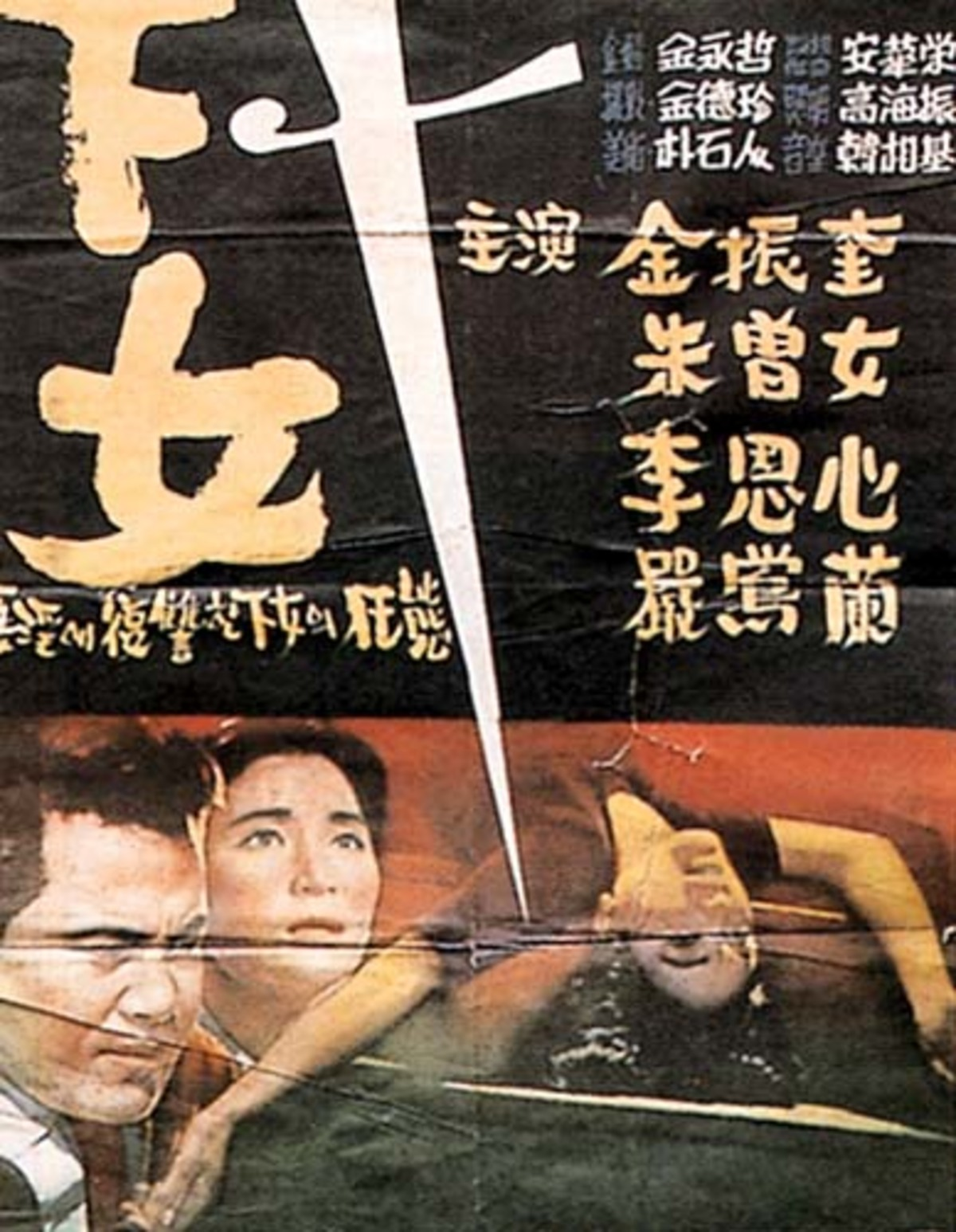
Poster for The Housemaid (1960)

Though filmmakers were still subject to government censorship, South Korea experienced a golden age of cinema, mostly consisting of melodramas, starting in the mid-1950s. The number of films made in South Korea increased from only 15 in 1954 to 111 in 1959.

One of the most popular films of the era, director Lee Kyu-hwan's now lost remake of Chunhyangjeon (1955), drew 10 percent of Seoul's population to movie theaters However, while Chunhyang-jeon re-told a traditional Korean story, another popular film of the era, Han Hyung-mo's Madame Freedom (1956), told a modern story about female sexuality and Western values.

South Korean filmmakers enjoyed a brief freedom from censorship in the early 1960s, between the administrations of Syngman Rhee and Park Chung Hee. Kim Ki-young's The Housemaid (1960) and Yu Hyun-mok's Obaltan (1960), now considered among the best South Korean films ever made, were produced during this time. Kang Dae-jin's The Coachman (1961) became the first South Korean film to win an award at an international film festival when it took home the Silver Bear Jury Prize at the 1961 Berlin International Film Festival.

When Park Chung Hee became acting president in 1962, government control over the film industry increased substantially. Under the Motion Picture Law of 1962, a series of increasingly restrictive measures was enacted that limited imported films under a quota system. The new regulations also reduced the number of domestic film-production companies from 71 to 16 within a year. Government censorship targeted obscenity, communism, and unpatriotic themes in films. Nonetheless, the Motion Picture Law's limit on imported films resulted in a boom of domestic films. South Korean filmmakers had to work quickly to meet public demand, and many films were shot in only a few weeks. During the 1960s, the most popular South Korean filmmakers released six to eight films per year. Notably, director Kim Soo-yong released ten films in 1967, including Mist, which is considered to be his greatest work.

In 1967, South Korea's first animated feature film, Hong Kil-dong, was released. A handful of animated films followed including Golden Iron Man (1968), South Korea's first science-fiction animated film.

=== Censorship and propaganda (1973–1979) ===
Government control of South Korea's film industry reached its height during the 1970s under President Park Chung Hee's authoritarian "Yusin System." The Korean Motion Picture Promotion Corporation was created in 1973, ostensibly to support and promote the South Korean film industry, but its primary purpose was to control the film industry and promote "politically correct" support for censorship and government ideals. According to the 1981 International Film Guide, "No country has a stricter code of film censorship than South Korea – with the possible exception of the North Koreans and some other Communist bloc countries."

Only filmmakers who had previously produced "ideologically sound" films and who were considered to be loyal to the government were allowed to release new films. Members of the film industry who tried to bypass censorship laws were blacklisted and sometimes imprisoned. One such blacklisted filmmaker, the prolific director Shin Sang-ok, was kidnapped by the North Korean government in 1978 after the South Korean government revoked his film-making license in 1975.

The propaganda-laden movies (or "policy films") produced in the 1970s were unpopular with audiences who had become accustomed to seeing real-life social issues onscreen during the 1950s and 1960s. In addition to government interference, South Korean filmmakers began losing their audience to television, and movie-theater attendance dropped by over 60 percent from 1969 to 1979.

Films that were popular among audiences during this era include Yeong-ja's Heydays (1975) and Winter Woman (1977), both box office hits directed by Kim Ho-sun. Yeong-ja's Heydays and Winter Women are classified as "hostess films," which are movies about prostitutes and bargirls. Despite their overt sexual content, the government allowed the films to be released, and the genre was extremely popular during the 1970s and 1980s.

=== Recovery (1980–1996) ===
In the 1980s, the South Korean government began to relax its censorship and control of the film industry. The Motion Picture Law of 1984 allowed independent filmmakers to begin producing films, and the 1986 revision of the law allowed more films to be imported into South Korea.

Meanwhile, South Korean films began reaching international audiences for the first time in a significant way. Director Im Kwon-taek's Mandala (1981) won the Grand Prix at the 1981 Hawaii Film Festival, and he soon became the first Korean director in years to have his films screened at European film festivals. His film Gilsoddeum (1986) was shown at the 36th Berlin International Film Festival, and actress Kang Soo-yeon won Best Actress at the 1987 Venice International Film Festival for her role in Im's film, The Surrogate Woman.

In 1985, the South Korean government signed an agreement to lift all restrictions on foreign films, allowing US companies to import films freely and distribute their films in Korea rather than through Korean distributors. By 1988, United International Pictures (UIP) and 20th Century Fox had set up offices in the country. However, the Performance Ethics Committee would not allow more than one film per company on its censorship list at a time and took over 2 months to approve a film for release, which restricted the number of films that could be released. In September 1988, Fatal Attraction was the first film to be directly distributed by a US company (UIP), with the film sold on a royalty basis, but the release led to protests from Korean film directors, producers and distributors as they were concerned that UIP wanted to remit all the ticket sale revenue to the US which would have a negative impact on the manufacture and promotion of Korean motion pictures. In order for domestic films to compete, the government once again enforced a screen quota that required movie theaters to show domestic films for at least 146 days per year. However, despite the quota, the market share of domestic films was only 16 percent by 1993.

The South Korean film industry was once again changed in 1992 with Kim Ui-seok's hit film Marriage Story, released by Samsung. It was the first South Korean movie to be released by business conglomerate known as a chaebol, and it paved the way for other chaebols to enter the film industry, using an integrated system of financing, producing, and distributing films.

Until 1996, when the Film Promotion Law was passed, the film industry was still subject to censorship. Censoring of scripts in pre-production was officially dismissed in the late 1980s, still producers were unofficially expected to present two copies to the Public Performance Ethics Committee, who had the power to modify by completely cutting scenes.

=== Renaissance (1997–present) ===
As a result of the 1997 Asian financial crisis, many chaebols began to scale back their involvement in the film industry. However, they had already laid the groundwork for a renaissance in South Korean film-making by supporting young directors and introducing good business practices into the industry. "New Korean Cinema," including glossy blockbusters and creative genre films, began to emerge in the late 1990s and 2000s. At the same time, representation of women in visual media drastically declined in the aftermath of the 1997 IMF Crisis.

South Korean cinema saw domestic box-office success exceeding that of Hollywood films in the late 1990s largely due to screen quota laws that limited the public showing foreign films. First enacted in 1967, South Korea's screen quota placed restrictions on the number of days per year that foreign films could be shown at any given theater—garnering criticism from film distributors outside South Korea as unfair. As a prerequisite for negotiations with the United States for a free-trade agreement, the Korean government cut its annual screen quota for domestic films from 146 days to 73 (allowing more foreign films to enter the market). In February 2006, South Korean movie workers responded to the reduction by staging mass rallies in protest. According to Kim Hyun, "South Korea's movie industry, like that of most countries, is grossly overshadowed by Hollywood. The nation exported US$2 million-worth of movies to the United States last year [2005] and imported $35.9 million-worth".

One of the first blockbusters was Kang Je-gyu's Shiri (1999), a film about a North Korean spy in Seoul. It was the first film in South Korean history to sell more than two million tickets in Seoul alone. Shiri was followed by other blockbusters including Park Chan-wook's Joint Security Area (2000), Kwak Jae-yong's My Sassy Girl (2001), Kwak Kyung-taek's Friend (2001), Kang Woo-suk's Silmido (2003), and Kang Je-gyu's Taegukgi (2004). In fact, both Silmido and Taegukgi were seen by 10 million people domestically—about one-quarter of South Korea's entire population.

South Korean films began attracting significant international attention in the 2000s, due in part to filmmaker Park Chan-wook, whose movie Oldboy (2003) won the Grand Prix at the 2004 Cannes Film Festival and was praised by American directors including Quentin Tarantino and Spike Lee, the latter of whom directed the remake Oldboy (2013).

Director Bong Joon-ho's The Host (2006) and later the English-language film Snowpiercer (2013), are among the highest-grossing films of all time in South Korea and were praised by foreign film critics. Yeon Sang-ho's Train to Busan (2016), also one of the highest-grossing films of all time in South Korea, became the second highest-grossing film in Hong Kong in 2016.

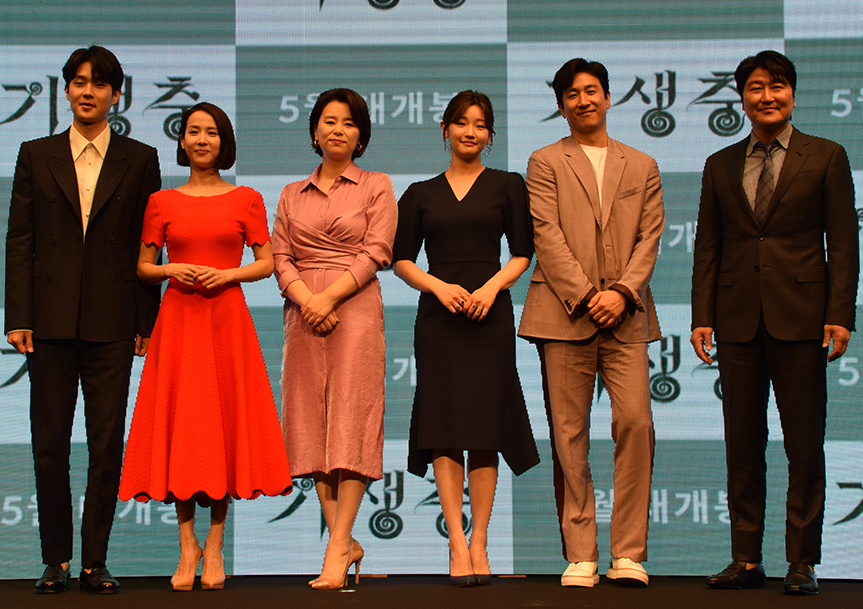
The cast of Parasite, the first Korean film to win the Palme d'Or and Academy Award for Best Picture

In 2019, Bong Joon-ho's Parasite became the first film from South Korea to win the prestigious Palme d'Or at the Cannes Film Festival. At the 92nd Academy Awards, Parasite became the first South Korean film to receive any sort of Academy Awards recognition, receiving six nominations. It won Best Picture, Best Director, Best International Feature Film and Best Original Screenplay, becoming the first film produced entirely by an Asian country to receive a nomination for the Academy Award for Best Picture since Crouching Tiger, Hidden Dragon, as well as the first non-English-language film to win the Academy Award for Best Picture. (Note: Although Parasite was the first film with a non-English script to win Best Picture at the Oscars, it is not to be confused with the first foreign film (produced by a company of a country that does not have English as its primary language) to win Best Picture, which was achieved by The Artist in 2012. The French-produced film was largely silent with French intertitles and contained a few spoken lines in English. The Academy dictates foreign language as the main qualification for international film, hence The Artist did not qualify. Further, while prior winners The Last Emperor and Slumdog Millionaire include significant amounts of non-English dialogue, they were considered products of the Hollywood system.)

Park Chan-wook's Decision to Leave and Hirokazu Kore-eda's Broker each won an award at the 2022 Cannes Film Festival. While Song Kang-ho became the first South Korean actor to win Best Actor at the same festival.

== Highest-grossing films ==
The Korean Film Council has published box office data on South Korean films since 2004. As of March 2025, the top ten highest-grossing domestic films in South Korea since 2004 are as follows.

1. The Admiral: Roaring Currents (2014)
2. Extreme Job (2019)
3. Along with the Gods: The Two Worlds (2017)
4. Ode to My Father (2014)
5. Veteran (2015)
6. 12.12: The Day (2023)
7. The Host (2006)
8. The Thieves (2012)
9. Miracle in Cell No.7 (2013)
10. Assassination (2015)

== Genres ==
- Aeni
- Sageuk
- Korean horror has entered its first fertile period in the 1960s. Modern South Korean horror films are typically distinguished by stylish directing, themes of social commentary, and genre blending. Horror films are designed to 'cool' the audience; traditionally, horror films are screened domestically during the summer months, as they are thought to be effective at lowering body temperature by providing 'chills'.
- Korean science fiction
- Zainichi cinema
- South Korean Queer Cinema

== Film awards ==
South Korea's first film awards ceremonies were established in the 1950s, but have since been discontinued. The longest-running and most popular film awards ceremonies are the Grand Bell Awards, which were established in 1962, and the Blue Dragon Film Awards, which were established in 1963. Other awards ceremonies include the Baeksang Arts Awards, the Korean Association of Film Critics Awards, and the Busan Film Critics Awards.

== Film festivals ==
=== In South Korea ===
Founded in 1996, the Busan International Film Festival is South Korea's major film festival and has grown to become one of the largest and most prestigious film events in Asia.

=== South Korea at international festivals ===
The first South Korean film to win an award at an international film festival was Kang Dae-jin's The Coachman (1961), which was awarded the Silver Bear Jury Prize at the 1961 Berlin International Film Festival. The tables below list South Korean films that have since won major international film festival prizes.

==== Academy Awards ====
Year	Award	Film	Recipient
2020	Best Picture	Parasite	Kwak Sin-ae, Bong Joon-ho
2020	Best Director	Parasite	Bong Joon-ho
2020	Best Original Screenplay	Parasite	Bong Joon-ho, Han Jin-won
2020	Best International Feature Film	Parasite	Bong Joon-ho
2021	Best Supporting Actress	Minari	Youn Yuh-jung

==== Berlin International Film Festival ====
Year	Award	Film	Recipient
1961	Silver Bear Extraordinary Jury Prize	The Coachman	Kang Dae-jin
1962	Silver Bear Extraordinary Jury Prize	To the Last Day	Shin Sang-ok
1994	Alfred Bauer Prize	Hwa-Om-Kyung	Jang Sun-woo
2004	Silver Bear for Best Director	Samaritan Girl	Kim Ki-duk
2005	Honorary Golden Bear	—N/a	Im Kwon-taek
2007	Alfred Bauer Prize	I'm a Cyborg, But That's OK	Park Chan-wook
2011	Golden Bear for Best Short Film	Night Fishing	Park Chan-wook, Park Chan-kyong
2011	Silver Bear for Best Short Film	Broken Night	Yang Hyo-joo
2017	Silver Bear for Best Actress	On the Beach at Night Alone	Kim Min-hee
2020	Silver Bear for Best Director	The Woman Who Ran	Hong Sang-soo
2021	Silver Bear for Best Screenplay	Introduction	Hong Sang-soo
2022	Silver Bear Grand Jury Prize	The Novelist's Film	Hong Sang-soo
2024	Silver Bear Grand Jury Prize	A Traveler's Needs	Hong Sang-soo

==== Cannes Film Festival ====
Year	Award	Film	Recipient
2002	Best Director	Chi-hwa-seon	Im Kwon-taek
2004	Grand Prix	Oldboy	Park Chan-wook
2007	Best Actress	Secret Sunshine	Jeon Do-yeon
2009	Prix du Jury	Thirst	Park Chan-wook
2010	Best Screenplay Award	Poetry	Lee Chang-dong
2010	Prix Un Certain Regard	Hahaha	Hong Sang-soo
2011	Prix Un Certain Regard	Arirang	Kim Ki-duk
2013	Short Film Palme d'Or	Safe	Moon Byoung-gon
2019	Palme d'Or	Parasite	Bong Joon-ho
2022	Best Director	Decision to Leave	Park Chan-wook
2022	Best Actor	Broker	Song Kang-ho

==== Venice Film Festival ====
Year	Award	Film	Recipient
1987	Volpi Cup for Best Actress	The Surrogate Woman	Kang Soo-yeon
2002	Silver Lion	Oasis	Lee Chang-dong
2004	Silver Lion	3-Iron	Kim Ki-duk
2012	Golden Lion	Pietà	Kim Ki-duk

==== Toronto International Film Festival ====
Year	Award	Film	Recipient
2019	Grolsch People's Choice Award 2nd Runner-Up	Parasite	Bong Joon-ho

==== Sundance Film Festival ====
Year	Award	Film	Recipient
2004	Freedom of Expression Award	Repatriation	Kim Dong-won
2013	World Cinema Grand Jury Prize: Dramatic	Jiseul	O Muel

==== Telluride Film Festival ====
Year	Award	Film	Recipient
2000	Silver Medallion	N/A	Im Kwon-taek

==== Tokyo International Film Festival ====
Year	Award	Film	Recipient
1987	FIPRESCI Prize	The Man with Three Coffins	Lee Jang-ho
1992	Grand Prix	White Badge	Chung Ji-young
1992	Best Director	White Badge	Chung Ji-young
1998	Gold Award	Spring in My Hometown	Lee Kwang-mo
1999	Special Jury Prize	Rainbow Trout	Park Jong-won
2000	Special Jury Prize	Virgin Stripped Bare by Her Bachelors	Hong Sang-soo
2000	Asian Film Award - Special Mention	Virgin Stripped Bare by Her Bachelors	Hong Sang-soo
2001	Best Artistic Contribution Award	One Fine Spring Day	Hur Jin-ho
2003	Asian Film Award	Memories of Murder	Bong Joon-ho
2003	Asian Film Award - Special Mention	Jealousy Is My Middle Name	Park Chan-ok
2004	Best Director	The President's Barber	Im Chan-sang
2004	Audience Award	The President's Barber	Im Chan-sang
2004	Asian Film Award	Possible Changes	Min Byeong-guk
2004	Asian Film Award - Special Mention	Springtime	Ryu Jang-ha
2009	Asian Film Award	A Brand New Life	Ounie Lecomte
2012	Special Jury Prize	Juvenile Offender	Kang Yi-Kwan
2012	Best Actor	Juvenile Offender	Seo Young-Joo
2013	Audience Award	Red Family	Lee Ju-hyoung

==== Locarno Festival ====
Year	Award	Film	Recipient
1989	Golden Leopard	Why Has Bodhi-Dharma Left for the East?	Bae Yong-kyun
2001	Best Actress	Nabi	Kim Ho-jung
2013	Best Direction	Our Sunhi	Hong Sang-soo
2015	Golden Leopard	Right Now, Wrong Then	Hong Sang-soo
2015	Best Actor	Right Now, Wrong Then	Jung Jae-young
2018	Best Actor	Hotel by the River	Gi Ju-bong
2019	Special Jury Prize	Height of the Wave	Park Jung-bum
2024	Best Performance	By the Stream	Kim Min-hee

== See also ==
- Cinema of Korea
- Cinema of North Korea
- List of South Korean Academy Award winners and nominees
