= Music quota =

Radio broadcasting quota

Music quota refers to policy that enforces minimum airtime of domestic songs for a certain period to protect the local music industry.

== Australia ==
The Australian music quota imposed on domestic radio stations depends on how it its classified by the Australian Communications and Media Authority (ACMA).

== Canada ==
The Canadian Radio-television and Telecommunications Commission (CRTC) requires at least 35% of music played on domestic radio stations to have been written and/or recorded/performed by a Canadian. The requirement was introduced in 1971 at 25%, and was then increased over the years.

== France ==
A 1994 law in France requires a minimum of four in ten songs broadcast by domestic radio stations to be in the French language.

== Germany ==
There is no legislation in Germany mandating a radio quota but there has been efforts to introduced one since the mid-1990s.

== Ireland ==
There is no radio quota in place in Ireland where music created in Ireland is played once to every six plays for international artists as of 2020. A bill filed in the Dáil Éireann proposing to impose 40% radio quota for Irish music was defeated in 2016.

== Philippines ==
Under Executive Order No. 255 issued by President Corazon Aquino in 1987, radio stations with musical format programs in the Philippines are required to broadcast a minimum of four Original Pilipino Music compositions every clockhour.

== See also ==
- Screen quotas
