= Celine Song =

Canadian director and writer (born 1988)

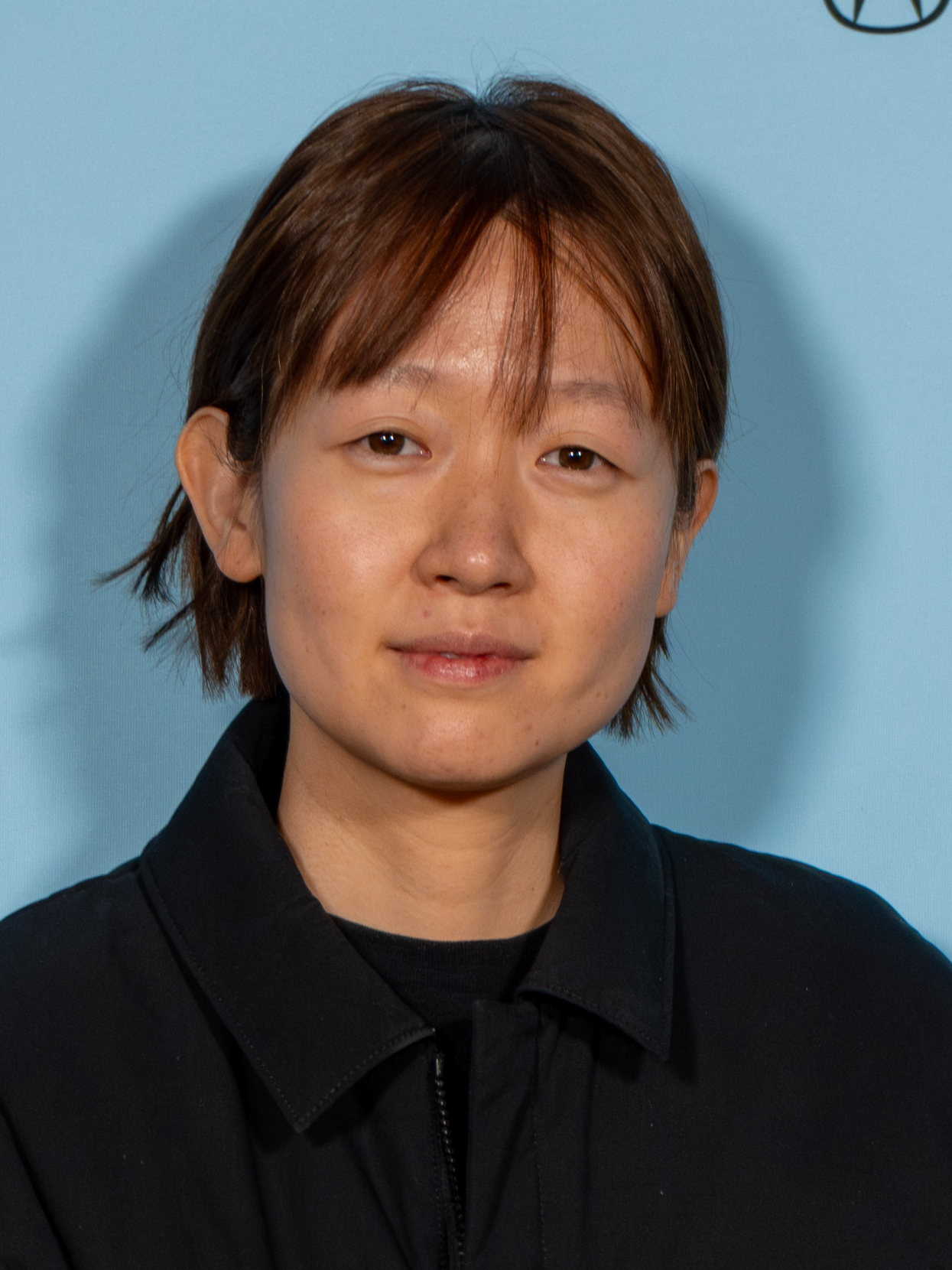
- Celine Song at the 2025 Sundance Film Festival
- Born: Song Ha-Young; 19 September 1988 (age 38); South Korea
- Citizenship: Canada
- Education: Queen's University (BA); Columbia University (MFA)
- Occupations: Filmmaker; playwright
- Years active: 2017–present
- Spouse: Justin Kuritzkes (m. 2016)

Korean name
- Hangul: 송하영
- RR: Song Hayeong
- MR: Song Hayŏng

Celine Song (born Song Ha-Young; Korean: 송하영; born 19 September 1988) is a Canadian director, playwright, and screenwriter based in New York City. Among her plays are Endlings and The Seagull on The Sims 4 (both 2020). Her directorial film debut, Past Lives (2023), released by A24, received critical acclaim and was nominated for the Academy Award for Best Picture and Best Original Screenplay. Her second film, Materialists, also with A24, earned more than $100 million worldwide.

== Early life and education ==
Song was born in South Korea. Her parents, both artists, moved the family to Markham, Ontario, Canada when she was 12. Upon moving to Ontario, Song was given permission by her parents to select a new forename and decided it would be Celine (formerly Ha-Young). Some of her immediate family members believe that she selected the name from the 1974 film Céline and Julie Go Boating, whereas Song is convinced that she decided upon the name after seeing a Céline Dion album. Her father, Song Neung-han, is a filmmaker. Her mother is an illustrator and graphic designer.

Song wrote her first play, an adaptation of Prometheus, at a classics conference she attended (the Ontario Student Classics Conference) with the Markham District Classics Club. During her undergraduate studies in 2009, Song wrote and directed a play titled Sound Utterly Serious, which was referred to as an "innovative gem" by The Queen's Journal.

In Markham, Song attended public school Markham District High School (MDHS). Song received her undergraduate degree from Queen's University in Kingston, Ontario, where she studied psychology with a minor in philosophy, graduating in 2010. She was the founder of an atheist club there, and was its first president. Song was initially hoping to pursue a career in clinical psychology. She initially sought that career path as a stepping stone towards becoming a writer, but decided to skip becoming a psychologist and go straight into writing after taking a German literature course where she was exposed to the work of Bertolt Brecht. She received her MFA in playwriting from Columbia University in 2014. She applied to multiple schools, pursuing programs in both playwriting and screenwriting, but decided on Columbia University because of a professor who convinced her to come to New York.

== Career ==
=== 2014–2018: Playwriting ===
Song's early career was largely dedicated to further developing her playwriting skills. From 2014 to 2015, she was part of the Ars Nova's Play Group, and in 2014 and 2016 was a Great Plains Theatre Conference Playwright. She was also part of the Public Theater's Emerging Writers Group from 2016 to 2017, and held a writing fellowship with Playwrights Realm during the 2017-2018 season.

=== 2019–2020: Off-Broadway works ===
Song's play Endlings premiered in 2019 at the American Repertory Theater. The show's off-Broadway run opened in March 2020 at New York Theatre Workshop, but was cut short due to the COVID-19 pandemic. The show tells the story of three older Korean women haenyeos and a Korean-Canadian writer living in New York. In a mixed review, Alexandra Schwartz of The New Yorker called Endlings "two works spliced roughly together: a traditional play that seeks to depict people's lives, and a metafictional examination of the playwright's own motivations, which flirts with honesty before traipsing down a solipsistic path of no return." The play was chosen for the 2018 O'Neill Playwrights Conference and was a finalist for the 2020 Susan Smith Blackburn Prize. Endlings was also incorporated on the 2017 Kilroy's List.

In November 2020, Song directed a live production of Chekhov's The Seagull using The Sims 4 on Twitch for New York Theatre Workshop, called The Seagull on The Sims 4. In a review for Vulture, Helen Shaw praised the play: "I think Song's game-play/play-game managed the trick by capturing the experience not of going to a show but of working on one. At her urging, viewers brought the quality of attention that comes with collaboration, and that felt like a churning motor under everything, trying to propel the show into being."

Song's other plays include Tom and Eliza, which was named a semifinalist for the American Playwriting Foundation's 2016 Relentless Award, Family, and The Feast. According to her biography on The Playwright's Realm, "she has been awarded residences, fellowships, and commissions from MTC/Sloan, Sundance, the Millay Colony for the Arts, the MacDowell Colony, Yaddo, and the Edward F. Albee Foundation."

=== 2021–present: Breakthrough ===
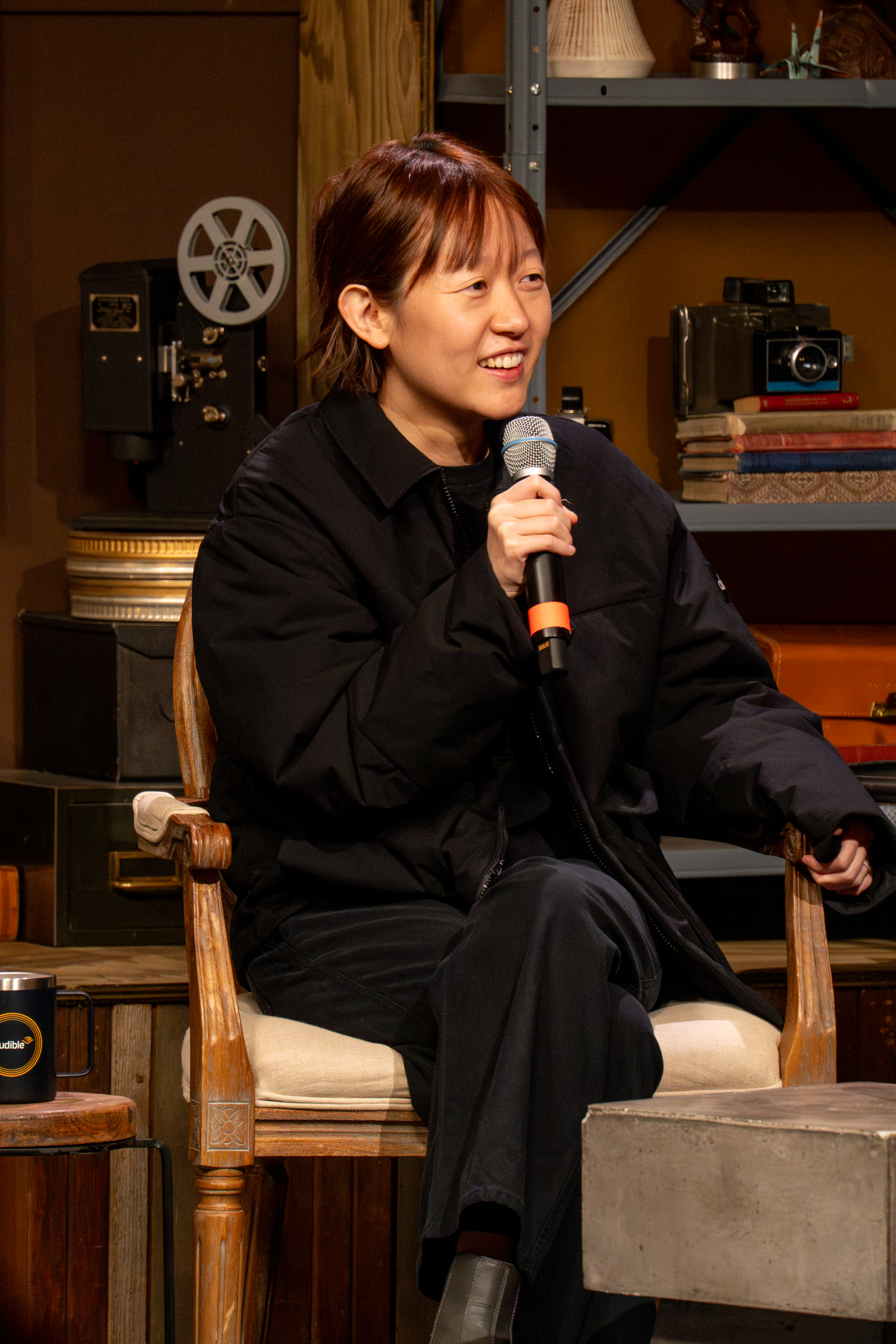
Song at the 2025 Sundance Film Festival

Song's first television screenwriting job was as a staff writer for the first season of Amazon's The Wheel of Time in 2021. The opportunity for the screenwriting job arose after Rafe Judkins, the showrunner for a TV series in development, had read a script that Song wrote.

Song wrote the screenplay for Past Lives, her directorial film debut, about two childhood friends who reunite as adults (portrayed by Greta Lee and Teo Yoo). The film is partly inspired by Song's life, specifically a dinner she had with her English-speaking husband and a Korean-speaking friend visiting New York. She said that "at one point, I realized that I wasn't just translating between their languages and cultures, but also translating between these two parts of myself as well." The film was produced by A24 and premiered at the Sundance Film Festival in January 2023.

Past Lives received critical acclaim and has been compared to the work of Richard Linklater, Woody Allen, and Noah Baumbach. The Guardian's Benjamin Lee wrote that "as writer, Song manages to keep her dialogue believably light-footed and spare while as director, she confidently and evocatively captures both cities with a breadth that belies her inexperience". Richard Lawson of Vanity Fair called the film "understated and yet vast in its consideration of the slow changes of life, of the past ever whispering to the present. The film is as auspicious a debut as one can hope to see at Sundance, the announcement of a filmmaker confident in her craft and generous with her heart." The film Past Lives has also been praised for its portrayal of an immigrant experience and for its universal representation of love and fate. The film received many accolades, including nominations for Best Picture and Best Original Screenplay at the 96th Academy Awards. Song was the first Asian woman to be nominated for the Academy Award for Best Original Screenplay. For Past Lives, Song was also awarded outstanding directorial achievement in a first-time feature film by the Directors Guild of America.

Her next film project with A24, Materialists, starring Dakota Johnson, Pedro Pascal, and Chris Evans, was released in theaters on 13 June 2025. Materialists was inspired by Song's experience and knowledge gained from her time being a matchmaker in New York City. The idea was further solidified at a charity event in New York when a wealthy donor she was talking to completely ignored a waiter that she knew from grad school. She spent the six-month period between when Past Lives was finished and when it debuted at the 2023 Sundance Film Festival writing the screenplay. The film follows Lucy's (played by Dakota Johnson) story when it comes to love in both matchmaking and her own romantic pursuits. It highlights Lucy's talent and skill as a matchmaker, as well as her struggle within her love triangle to pick between new-boy Harry (played by Pedro Pascal) and her ex-partner John (played by Chris Evans).

Within a few months post-release, the film Materialists earned more than $100 million worldwide. Marriska Fernandes of CBC Arts wrote that the film Materialists "is a masterclass in weaving profound questions into a narrative that remains both captivating and emotionally intelligent. Materialists has been garnering attention from moviegoers globally because it smartly subverts traditional rom-com tropes by making the material aspects of potential partners glaringly explicit". The film received praise for its portrayal of love as both an analytical and selective process as well as a spontaneous, destined, and emotional connection. However, the film was also criticized for the expectedness and unoriginality of its ending and for its missteps in its portrayal of a love triangle plot, with a review stating that "romantic triangles can collapse if all three legs aren't properly supported".

In April 2024, the music video for pop artist Laufey's song "Goddess" was released, directed by Song. And in July 2025, it was announced that Song was to write an upcoming sequel to My Best Friend's Wedding (1997) by Sony Pictures. Song's other upcoming project is a new A24 drama series Damage at HBO, where she is working with David Hinojosa, Jacqueline Lesko, Craig Mazin, and Cecil O'Connor. She was an executive producer and writer for this project. Song previously worked with David Hinojosa on both of her films Past Lives and Materialists. The development of this series began in September 2025.

In November 2025, a short film directed by Celine Song for Armani was released, called The Waiting Room. Part of their crossroads series, it depicts five women recounting their stories of transformation at personal or professional crossroads.

In 2026, Song became the recipient of the 2026 Whiting Award in Drama.

== Other activities ==
In 2025, Song served on the jury of the Marrakech International Film Festival, chaired by Bong Joon Ho.

== Filmmaking style and themes ==
=== Directing actors ===
Song is very precise when it comes to directing actors. She does not allow improvisation, and instead meticulously tests her dialogue with other screenwriters to hone it down. When directing Past Lives, she did not allow Greta Lee and Teo Yoo to physically touch each other until their characters reunite onscreen as adults. Similarly, Yoo and John Magaro were not allowed to meet at all until their characters do for the first time. The first take of this scene is what was used in the final cut of the film. When asked about this, Song said,

I wanted the whole film to feel like a knife, and it's got to build to the point where it's sharp and you're going to stab. By the time we enter the third act and they meet each other, it's like an explosion.

=== Love and romance ===
Both of her currently released films, Past Lives and Materialists, have a strong focus on love and modern-day relationships. The way they explore those themes is very different, though; Materialists is about a protagonist who focuses on the material even in the pursuit of love, and is caught in a love triangle where she must choose whether or not to continue believing that. Past Lives has the outer appearance of a love triangle, but is instead about the protagonist, Nora, finding peace with the roads she has taken in her life.

== Personal life ==
Song resides in New York City with her husband, writer Justin Kuritzkes, whom she met at an artist residency hosted by the Edward F. Albee Foundation. Song has said he is always the first person to read her scripts. Song confirmed on 19 September 2026 that she and Kuritzkes are expecting their first child.

== Works ==
=== Film ===
Year	Title	Director	Writer	Producer	Ref.
2023	Past Lives	Yes	Yes	Executive	
2025	Materialists	Yes	Yes	Yes	

=== Television ===
Year	Title	Note	Ref.
2021	The Wheel of Time	Staff writer, Wrote episode "Blood Calls Blood"	

=== Theatre ===
Year	Title	Notes	Ref.
2020	Endlings	NYTW, February–March, 2020	
2020	The Seagull on The Sims 4	NYTW, 27–28 October 2020	

== Accolades ==
Association	Year	Category	Work	Result	Ref.
Alliance of Women Film Journalists	2023	Best Director	Past Lives	Nominated	
Alliance of Women Film Journalists	2023	Best Original Screenplay	Past Lives	Nominated	
Alliance of Women Film Journalists	2023	Best Woman Director	Past Lives	Nominated	
Alliance of Women Film Journalists	2023	Best Woman Screenwriter	Past Lives	Won	
Asia Pacific Screen Awards	2023	Best Director	Past Lives	Won	
Berlin International Film Festival	2023	Golden Bear	Past Lives	Nominated	
Boston Society of Film Critics	2023	Best New Filmmaker	Past Lives	Won	
British Independent Film Awards	2023	Best International Independent Film	Past Lives	Nominated	
Chicago Film Critics Association	2023	Best Original Screenplay	Past Lives	Nominated	
Chicago Film Critics Association	2023	Milos Stehlik Award for Breakthrough Filmmaker	Past Lives	Won	
Dallas–Fort Worth Film Critics Association	2023	Best Director	Past Lives	5th place	
Dublin Film Critics' Circle	2023	Best Director	Past Lives	Won	
Florida Film Critics Circle	2023	Best Director	Past Lives	Nominated	
Florida Film Critics Circle	2023	Best First Film	Past Lives	Won	
Florida Film Critics Circle	2023	Best Original Screenplay	Past Lives	Won	
Florida Film Critics Circle	2023	Pauline Kael Breakout Award	Past Lives	Runner-up	
Gotham Awards	2023	Best Feature	Past Lives	Won	
Gotham Awards	2023	Breakthrough Director	Past Lives	Nominated	
Los Angeles Film Critics Association	2023	New Generation Award	Past Lives	Won	
National Board of Review	2023	Best Directorial Debut	Past Lives	Won	
New York Film Critics Online	2023	Best Debut Director	Past Lives	Won	
San Diego Film Critics Society	2023	Best First Feature	Past Lives	Runner-up	
San Diego Film Critics Society	2023	Best Original Screenplay	Past Lives	Nominated	
St. Louis Film Critics Association	2023	Best Director	Past Lives	Nominated	
St. Louis Film Critics Association	2023	Best Original Screenplay	Past Lives	Nominated	
Sydney Film Festival	2023	Best Film	Past Lives	Nominated	
Toronto Film Critics Association	2023	Best Original Screenplay	Past Lives	Nominated	
Washington D.C. Area Film Critics Association	2023	Best Director	Past Lives	Nominated	
Washington D.C. Area Film Critics Association	2023	Best Original Screenplay	Past Lives	Won	
Academy Awards	2024	Best Original Screenplay	Past Lives	Nominated	
Astra Film Awards	2024	Best Director	Past Lives	Nominated	
Astra Film Awards	2024	Best First Feature	Past Lives	Won	
Astra Film Awards	2024	Best Original Screenplay	Past Lives	Nominated	
Austin Film Critics Association	2024	Best Director	Past Lives	Nominated	
Austin Film Critics Association	2024	Best First Film	Past Lives	Won	
Austin Film Critics Association	2024	Best Original Screenplay	Past Lives	Won	
Austin Film Critics Association	2024	The Robert R. "Bobby" McCurdy Memorial Breakthrough Artist Award	Past Lives	Nominated	
British Academy Film Awards	2024	Best Original Screenplay	Past Lives	Nominated	
British Academy Film Awards	2024	Best Film Not in the English Language	Past Lives	Nominated	
Critics' Choice Movie Awards	2024	Best Original Screenplay	Past Lives	Nominated	
Directors Guild of America Awards	2024	Outstanding Directing – First-Time Feature Film	Past Lives	Won	
Independent Spirit Awards	2024	Best Director	Past Lives	Won	
Independent Spirit Awards	2024	Best Screenplay	Past Lives	Nominated	
Georgia Film Critics Association	2024	Best Director	Past Lives	Nominated	
Georgia Film Critics Association	2024	Best Original Screenplay	Past Lives	Runner-up	
Georgia Film Critics Association	2024	Breakthrough Award	Past Lives	Nominated	
Golden Globe Awards	2024	Best Motion Picture - Drama	Past Lives	Nominated	
Golden Globe Awards	2024	Best Director	Past Lives	Nominated	
Golden Globe Awards	2024	Best Screenplay	Past Lives	Nominated	
International Cinephile Society	2024	Best Debut Film	Past Lives	Nominated	
London Film Critics' Circle	2024	Screenwriter of the Year	Past Lives	Nominated	
National Society of Film Critics	2024	Best Picture	Past Lives	Won	
Online Film Critics Society	2024	Best Director	Past Lives	Nominated	
Online Film Critics Society	2024	Best Original Screenplay	Past Lives	Nominated	
Online Film Critics Society	2024	Best Feature Debut	Past Lives	Won	
San Francisco Bay Area Film Critics Circle	2024	Best Director	Past Lives	Nominated	
San Francisco Bay Area Film Critics Circle	2024	Best Original Screenplay	Past Lives	Nominated	
Satellite Awards	2024	Best Original Screenplay	Past Lives	Nominated	
Seattle Film Critics Society	2024	Best Director	Past Lives	Nominated	
Seattle Film Critics Society	2024	Best Screenplay	Past Lives	Nominated	
Sundance Film Festival	2024	Vanguard Award	—N/a	Won	
Writers Guild of America Awards	2024	Best Original Screenplay	Past Lives	Nominated	
Blue Dragon Film Awards	2024	Best New Director	Past Lives	Nominated	
Blue Dragon Film Awards	2024	Best Screenplay	Past Lives	Nominated	
Cinema for Peace	2024	Most Valuable Film of the Year	Past Lives	Nominated	

== See also ==
- List of Academy Award winners and nominees of Asian descent
- List of South Korean Academy Award winners and nominees
