= List of awards and nominations received by Steven Yeun =

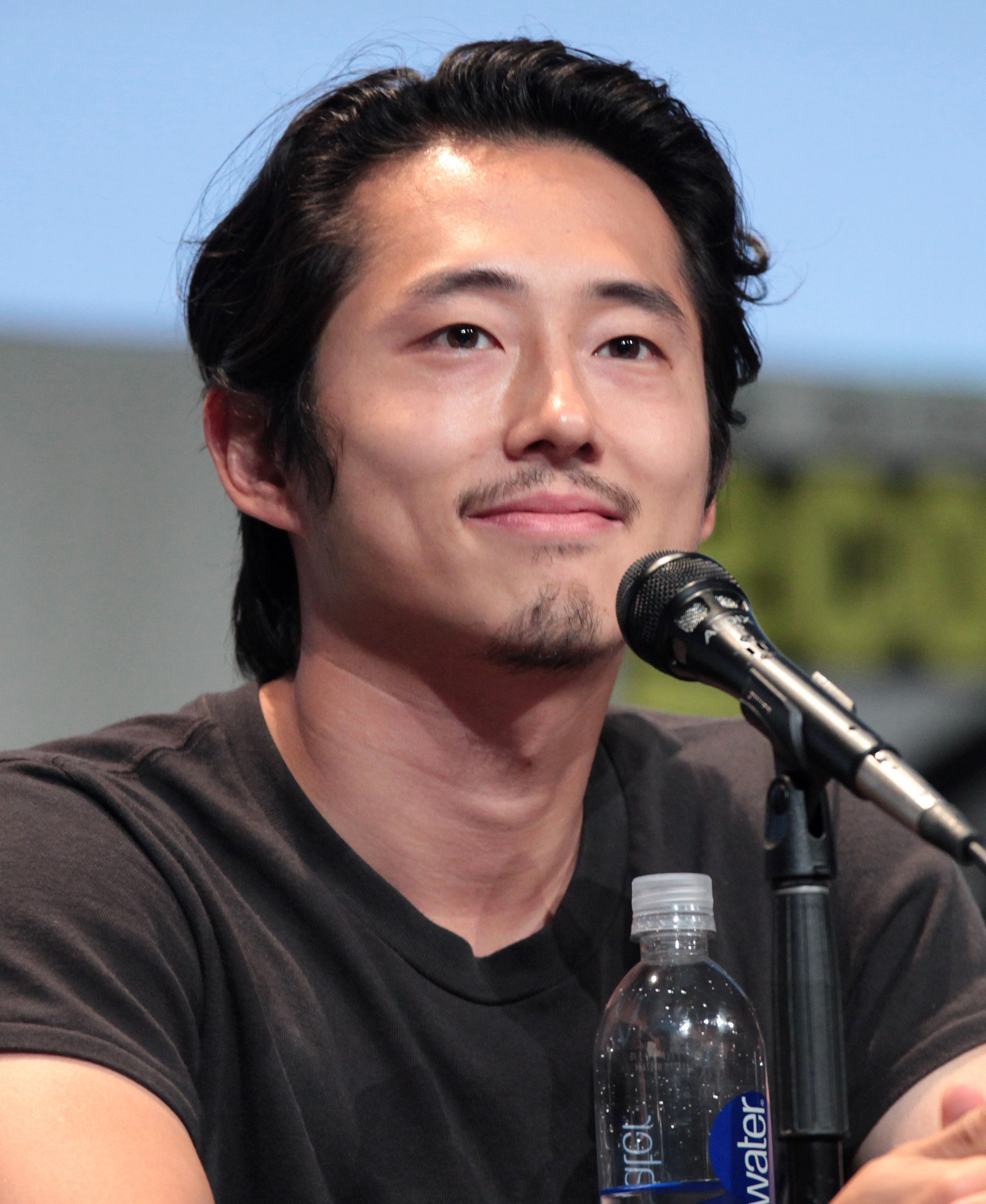
Steven Yeun at Comic Con in 2015

This article is a List of awards and nominations received by Steven Yeun.

Steven Yeun is an American actor known for his performances on film and television. He started his career playing Glenn Rhee in the AMC horror series The Walking Dead from 2010 to 2016. He transitioned into film earning acclaim for his roles in independent dramas such as Okja (2017), Burning (2018), Minari (2020), The Humans (2021) and Nope (2022). He returned to television producing and acting in the Netflix series Beef (2023).

Yeun has received numerous accolades including two Primetime Emmy Award, two Critics' Choice Awards, and two Golden Globe Awards in addition to nominations for an Academy Award and three Screen Actors Guild Awards. He was nominated for the Academy Award for Best Actor for his role as Jacob Yi in Minari (2020). He received the Primetime Emmy Award, Golden Globe Award, and Critics' Choice Award for Best Actor in a Miniseries or Movie for his role as Danny Cho in Beef (2023). He also received nominations for the Independent Spirit Award and Screen Actors Guild Award for the role as well.

== Major associations ==
=== Academy Awards ===
Year	Category	Nominated work	Result	Ref.
2020	Best Actor	Minari	Nominated	

=== BAFTA Awards ===
Year	Category	Nominated work	Result	Ref.
British Academy Television Awards
2024	Best International Programme	Beef	Nominated	

=== Critics' Choice Awards ===
Year	Category	Nominated work	Result	Ref.
Critics' Choice Movie Awards
2020	Best Actor	Minari	Nominated	
Critics' Choice Television Awards
2023	Best Limited Series	Beef	Won	
2023	Best Actor in a Movie/Miniseries	Beef	Won	

=== Emmy Awards ===
Year	Category	Nominated work	Result	Ref.
Primetime Emmy Awards
2023	Outstanding Limited or Anthology Series	Beef	Won	
2023	Outstanding Lead Actor in a Limited Series or Movie	Beef	Won	
2025	Outstanding Character Voice-Over Performance	Invincible	Nominated	
2026	Outstanding Character Voice-Over Performance	Invincible	Nominated	
2026	Outstanding Limited or Anthology Series	Beef	Pending	

=== Golden Globe Awards ===
Year	Category	Nominated work	Result	Ref.
2023	Best Limited or Anthology Series or Television Film	Beef	Won	
2023	Best Actor – Miniseries or Television Film	Beef	Won	

=== Independent Spirit Awards ===
Year	Category	Nominated work	Result	Ref.
2020	Best Male Lead	Minari	Nominated	
2023	Best New Scripted Series	Beef	Won	
2023	Best Lead Performance in a New Scripted Series	Beef	Nominated	

=== Screen Actors Guild Awards ===
Year	Category	Nominated work	Result	Ref.
2020	Outstanding Actor in a Leading Role	Minari	Nominated	
2020	Outstanding Cast in a Motion Picture	Minari	Nominated	
2023	Outstanding Actor in a Miniseries or Television Movie	Beef	Won	

== Critics awards ==
Year	Award	Category	Nominated work	Result	Ref.
2018	Boston Society of Film Critics	Best Supporting Actor	Burning	Runner-up	
2018	Chicago Film Critics Association	Best Supporting Actor	Burning	Nominated	
2018	Florida Film Critics Circle	Best Supporting Actor	Burning	Won	
2018	Greater Western New York Film Critics Association	Best Supporting Actor	Burning	Won	
2018	IndieWire Critics Poll	Best Supporting Actor	Burning	Won	
2018	Los Angeles Film Critics Association	Best Supporting Actor	Burning	Won	
2018	Seattle Film Critics Society	Best Actor in a Supporting Role	Burning	Nominated	
2018	Toronto Film Critics Association	Best Supporting Actor	Burning	Won	
2018	Vancouver Film Critics Circle	Best Supporting Actor	Burning	Nominated	
2018	Austin Film Critics Association	Best Supporting Actor	Burning	Nominated	
2018	National Society of Film Critics	Best Supporting Actor	Burning	Won	
2018	Online Film Critics Society	Best Supporting Actor	Burning	Nominated	
2020	Chicago Film Critics Association	Best Actor	Minari	Nominated	
2020	Chicago Indie Critics Awards	Best Actor	Minari	Nominated	
2020	Columbus Film Critics Association	Best Actor	Minari	Nominated	
2020	DiscussingFilm Critics Awards	Best Actor	Minari	Nominated	
2020	Greater Western New York Film Critics Association	Best Actor	Minari	Nominated	
2020	Houston Film Critics Society	Best Actor	Minari	Nominated	
2020	Indiana Film Journalists Association	Best Actor	Minari	Nominated	
2020	New Mexico Film Critics	Best Actor	Minari	Nominated	
2020	New Mexico Film Critics	Best Ensemble	Minari	Won	
2020	North Carolina Film Critics Association	Best Actor	Minari	Nominated	
2020	North Texas Film Critics Association	Best Actor	Minari	Nominated	
2020	Online Film Critics Society	Best Actor	Minari	Nominated	
2020	San Diego Film Critics Society	Best Actor	Minari	Nominated	
2020	San Francisco Bay Area Film Critics Circle	Best Actor	Minari	Nominated	
2020	Seattle Film Critics Society	Best Actor	Minari	Nominated	
2020	Washington D.C. Area Film Critics Association	Best Actor	Minari	Nominated	

== Assorted awards ==
Year	Award	Category	Nominated work	Result	Ref.
2011	Saturn Awards	Best Supporting Actor on Television	The Walking Dead	Nominated	
2012	Saturn Awards	Best Television Ensemble	The Walking Dead	Won	
2012	Satellite Awards	Best Cast – Television Series	The Walking Dead	Won	
2017	BTVA People's Choice Voice Acting Award	Best Vocal Ensemble in a New Television Series	Voltron: Legendary Defender	Won	
2017	BTVA Television Voice Acting Award	Best Vocal Ensemble in a New Television Series	Voltron: Legendary Defender	Nominated	
2017	Brooklyn Horror Film Festival	Best Actor	Mayhem	Won	
2018	Blue Dragon Film Awards	Best Supporting Actor	Burning	Nominated	
2018	Buil Film Awards	Best Supporting Actor	Burning	Nominated	
2018	Grand Bell Awards	Best Supporting Actor	Burning	Nominated	
2018	Baeksang Arts Awards	Best Supporting Actor	Burning	Nominated	
2018	Chlotrudis Awards	Best Supporting Actor	Burning	Nominated	
2018	Chunsa Film Art Awards	Best Supporting Actor	Burning	Won	
2018	International Cinephile Society	Best Supporting Actor	Burning	Runner-up	
2018	International Online Cinema Awards	Best Supporting Actor	Burning	Won	
2018	Santa Barbara International Film Festival	Virtuoso Award	Burning	Won	
2018	Saturn Awards	Best Supporting Actor	Burning	Nominated	
2018	Denver Film Festival	Excellence in Acting Award	Burning	Won	
2018	Satellite Awards	Best Actor	Burning	Nominated	
2023	American Film Institute Awards	Top 10 Television Programs of the Year	Beef	Won	
2023	Astra TV Awards	Best Streaming Limited or Anthology Series	Beef	Won	
2023	Astra TV Awards	Best Actor in a Streaming Limited or Anthology Series or Movie	Beef	Nominated	
2023	Gotham Independent Film Awards	Breakthrough Series – Short Form	Beef	Won	
2023	Gotham Independent Film Awards	Outstanding Performance in a New Series	Beef	Nominated	
2023	AACTA International Awards	Best Drama Series	Beef	Nominated	
2023	Producers Guild of America Awards	Best Limited Series Television	Beef	Won	
2023	People's Choice Awards	The TV Performance of the Year	Beef	Nominated	
2023	Satellite Awards	Best Miniseries or Television Film	Beef	Nominated	
2023	Satellite Awards	Best Actor – Miniseries or Television Film	Beef	Nominated	
