= The Coachman (film) =

- Poster to The Coachman
- Hangul: 마부
- Hanja: 馬夫
- RR: Mabu
- MR: Mabu
- Directed by: Kang Dae-jin
- Written by: Lim Hee-jae
- Produced by: Lee Hwa-ryong
- Starring: Kim Seung-ho; Shin Young-kyun
- Cinematography: Lee Mun-baek
- Edited by: Kim Hee-su
- Distributed by: Hwa Seong Films Co., Ltd.
- Release date: February 15, 1961
- Country: South Korea
- Language: Korean

The Coachman (Korean: 마부) is a 1961 South Korean film directed by Kang Dae-jin. At the 11th Berlin International Film Festival in 1961, The Coachman became the first Korean film to win a major international award. It was nominated for the Golden Bear Award and won the Silver Bear Extraordinary Jury Prize.

== Synopsis ==
A single father living with his adult children makes a living with a horse-drawn cart. He finds companionship with the maid of his boss. His eldest daughter is a deaf-mute married to an abusive man, his youngest seeks to meet a man of means and his youngest son is rebellious. His eldest son wants to help relieve the families financial problems by passing the bar exam.

== Bibliography ==
- "A Coachman (Mabu) (1961)". KMDb Korean Movie Database.
- "마부 A Coachman, 1961" (in Korean). Cine21.
- Mabu (1961) at IMDb
- Paquet, Darcy. "The Coachman (1961)". www.koreanfilm.org.
