= Screen quota =

Titles of legislation

A screen quota is a country's legislated policy that enforces a minimum number of days each year for the cinematic screening of that country's own films (and sometimes a minimum number of said films each year) in order to protect the status of those films, primarily as a method of preventing foreign markets from making inroads into the country's domestic film market. The screen quota system originated with the United Kingdom's Cinematograph Films Act 1927, with other countries such as Brazil, France, Greece, Italy, Japan, Pakistan, South Korea, and Spain subsequently enforcing their own screen quotas.

== In South Korea ==
The screen quota system has been enforced in South Korea since 1966. The system is:

- screening more than 6 Korean films each year and more than 90 screening days each year (1966)
- screening more than 3 Korean films each year and more than 30 screening days each year (1970)
- more than 1/3 of screening days each year (1973)
- more than 2/5 of screening days each year and reciprocal screening of Korean and foreign films in cities of more than 300,000 of population (1985)

In South Korea, the screen quota has contributed to the rapid increase in the film market. Until the 1990s, the Korean film market had lacked the ability to raise capital funds for films. The quality of Korean films has increased dramatically, with an inflow of capital funds into South Korean film market since 2000. The government has decided to reduce its 40-year-old screen quotas from 146 days to 73 days in 2006. As a result of the free trade agreement between South Korea and the United States, which was agreed on April 2, 2007, the screen quotas in South Korea will not be subject to change from the current 73 days.

=== Controversy of limiting screen quotas ===
The controversy of limiting screen quotas initially stemmed from South Korea-America BIT (Bilateral Investment Treaty). As a solution to South Korea's foreign exchange crisis in 1997, President Kim Daejung suggested BIT between South Korea and the United States in a hope that it would increase credibility of South Korean economy, thus boosting foreign investments. In June 1998, President Kim and Bill Clinton agreed to enforce BIT during Kim's visit to the US American government requested several requirements in opening South Korean market, including the alleviation of screen quotas. American government called for the reduction and abolition of screen quotas for the sake of Hollywood's expansion. Initially, the South Korean government did not expect this to be much of a problem that it agreed to consider it. The representatives tried to reach an agreement by decreasing the duration of screening days to a certain extent.

=== Domestic protests ===
When the decision to limit screen quotas was notified to the public, however, the Korean movie industry vehemently opposed the change. The movie industry strongly criticized both the South Korean and American government and struggled to resist the amendments. As the objection grew serious, the issue grasped the attention of the public. Under the name of protecting cultural sovereignty, many in the country sympathized with the movie industry and condemned lessening of screen quotas.

=== Current situation ===
The amendment of decreasing screening days to 73 days is in effect today. Mainly two factors contributed to the ratification of amendment. First, United States continued demand for the alleviation of screen quotas. Due to the change in industry structure, Hollywood suffered from increased deficit in its domestic market. One way to deal with this problem was to increase exportation by expanding into the foreign market. By 2004, the South Korean government suggested FTA (Free Trade Agreement) rather than BIT but the United States was hesitant in considering it. The American government urged that South Korea cannot start FTA and continue screen quotas act at the same time. The US demanded an effort to loosen screen quotas system before initiating FTA. This contributed to the alleviation of screen quotas, since the American government had been constantly requesting the abolition of screen quotas since South Korea- America BIT in 1998 while no change have been made, it was not a decisive factor.

The major factor was the change in Ministry of Culture and Tourism's stance. Until June 2004, the ministry had consistently sided with the pro screen quotas. The minister Lee Changdong had a background as a movie director and a political chairman of anti-screen quota union. Thus, the minister used to hold a firm stance toward continuation of screen quotas. However, there were several political barriers that resisted Lee from holding onto his belief. The dominant opinion of the politics was that screen quotas should quickly be dealt with by accepting the requirements of America. The government also argued that the screen quota was paralysing other important policies. Moreover, President Roh Muhyeon had a firm belief that South Korea – America FTA should be signed as fast as possible, with all the obstacles such as screen quotas being solved quickly.

== In other countries ==
The United Kingdom was the first country to enforce screen quotas under the Cinematograph Films Act 1927. It introduced a requirement for British cinemas to show a quota of British films for a duration of 10 years. The act's supporters believed that this would promote the emergence of a vertically integrated film industry, in which production, distribution and exhibition infrastructure are controlled by the same companies. The vertically integrated American film industry saw rapid growth in the years immediately following the end of World War I. The idea, therefore, was to try and counter Hollywood's perceived economic and cultural dominance by promoting similar business practices among British studios, distributors and cinema chains. By creating an artificial market for British films, it was hoped that the increased economic activity in the production sector would eventually lead to the growth of a self-sustaining industry. The quota was initially set at 7.5% for exhibitors, which was raised to 20% in 1935. However, the act is generally not considered as a success, with an absurd influx of poorly made films being produced known as "Quota Quickies" which were produced purely to fulfill the act; 192 films were produced in 1936 alone. Later, the act was modified by the Cinematograph Films Act 1938 and further acts, and eventually quotas (and levy rates) were abolished in the Films Act 1985.

In Brazil, quota is defined by a presidential decree every year. Currently, the requirement depends on the number of screens, varying from 28 days (for single screen movie theatres) to 644 (for 20 screens multiplexes).

In Greece, minimum days of showing domestic films each year is 28 days.

In Japan, the screen quota was enacted in the early Showa era, and was abolished in 1945.

In Spain, the minimum number of screening days of domestic films is between 73 and 91 days.

== See also ==
- Film Quota Act
- Music quota
