= Viva Freedom! =

1946 North Korean film by Choi In-kyu

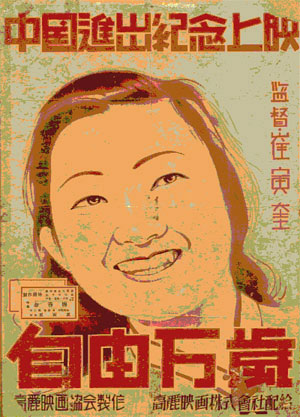
- Theatrical poster to Viva Freedom! (1946)
- Hangul: 자유만세
- Hanja: 自由萬歲
- RR: Jayu manse
- MR: Chayu manse
- Directed by: Choi In-kyu
- Written by: Jeon Chang-geun
- Produced by: Choi Wan-gyoo
- Starring: Jeon Chang-geun; Hwang Yeo-heui; Yu Gye-seon
- Cinematography: Han Hyeong-mo
- Edited by: Yang Joo-nam
- Music by: Pak T'ae-hyeon; Jo Baek-bong
- Production company: Koryo Film Co. Ltd.(고려영화주식회사)
- Distributed by: Dongshin film Co.(동신영화공사)
- Release date: October 21, 1946
- Running time: 53 minutes
- Country: Korea
- Language: Korean

Viva Freedom! (Korean: 자유만세; aka Hurrah! For Freedom) is a 1946 Korean film directed by Choi In-kyu. It was one of the first films made in the country after achieving independence from Japan.

During the colonial period, Choi was only allowed to make certain films, but the plot of Viva Freedom! is distinctly different, telling the story of a Korean patriotic resistance fighter in 1945.

The film was made a Registered Cultural Heritage of South Korea in 2007.

== Plot ==
Protagonist Choi Han-Jung, who was imprisoned for his independence activism, succeeds in breaking out of prison. Upon escaping, he stays with a comrade in the cause for independence, Park Jin-beom. He meets his other political comrades in a basement under a house built in a western-style and persuades them to continue their resistance to the Japanese Kempeitai in the 1940s when the fall of the Japanese empire was imminent. However, a member of the movement gets caught by the Japanese while moving the dynamite, which leads to Choi striving to save him and ends up surrounded by the Japanese military police. He hides in the residence of Mi-hyang, who is a mistress of the Japanese police high official Nanbu (南部). A gunfight with the Kempeitai ensues, which leads to Choi being injured and imprisoned in a university hospital while receiving treatment. With the help of nurse Hye-ja who loved Choi, Han-jung can keep doing his endeavors for independence. With the atomic bomb on Hiroshima and Nagasaki, Korea gains its independence due to Japan's surrender. While the streets of Jongno celebrate the event, Han-jung searches for the tomb of Mi-hyang, who lost her life.

== Cast ==
- Choi han jung: Jeon Chang-geun (全昌根)
- Mihyang: Yu Gye-seon (劉桂仙)
- Hyeja: Hwang Yeo-heui (黃麗姬)

== Reception ==
The film was well-received by the then audience who was touched by the liberation of Korea.

Chiang Kai-shek is reported to have written a calligraphic banner that reads "Viva freedom! Viva Korea! (自由萬歲 韓國萬歲)" after watching the movie in China.

== See also ==
- Our Construction – widely believed to be the first North Korean film
