= Steven Yeun =

South Korean and American actor (born 1983)

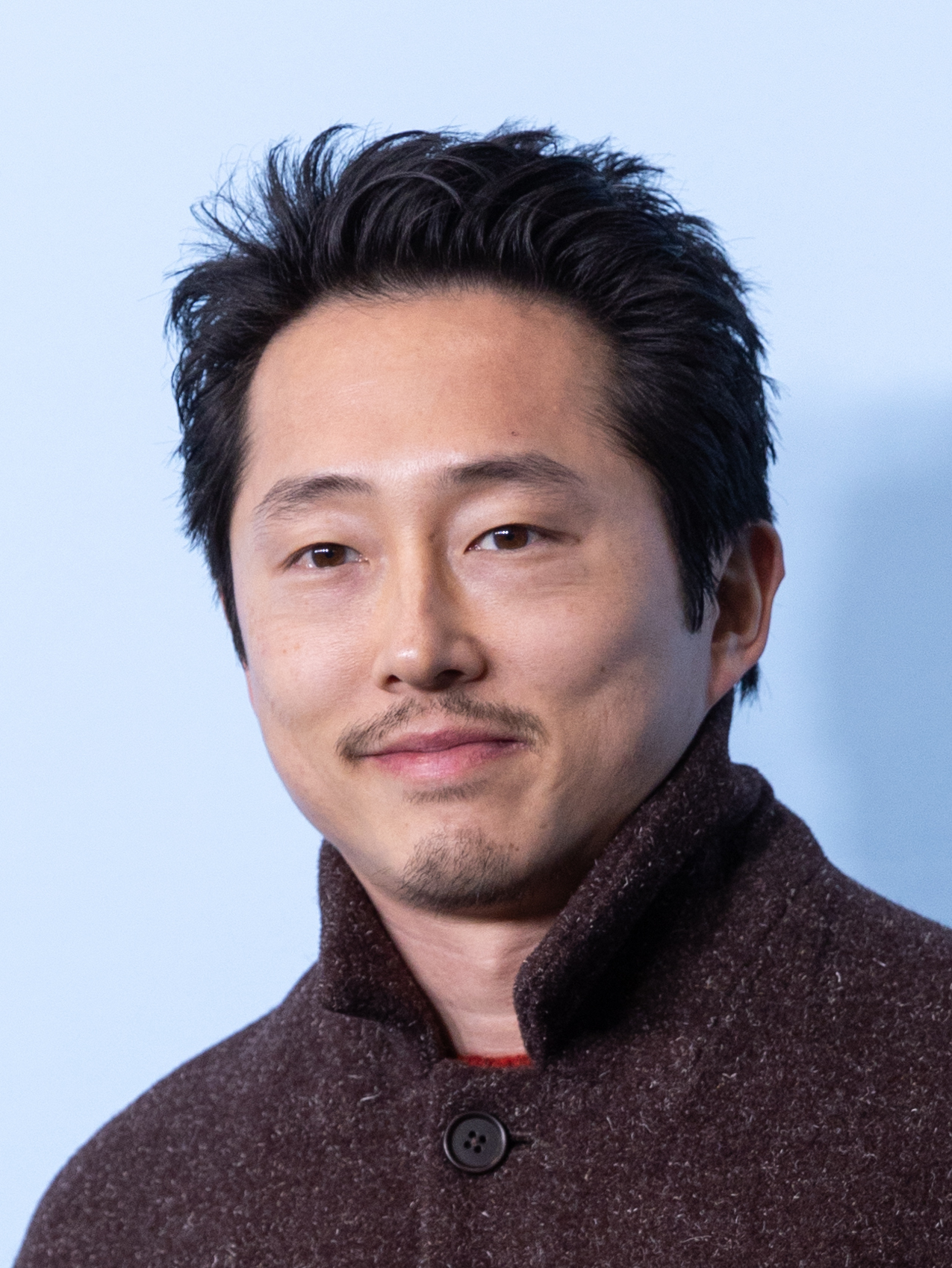
- Yeun in 2025
- Born: Sang-yeop Yeun; December 21, 1983 (age 42); Seoul, South Korea
- Citizenship: South Korea; United States
- Education: Kalamazoo College (BA)
- Occupation: Actor
- Years active: 2004–present
- Spouse: Joana Pak (m. 2016)
- Children: 2
- Awards: Full list

Korean name
- Hangul: 연상엽
- RR: Yeon Sangyeop
- MR: Yŏn Sangyŏp

Sang-yeop Yeun (Korean: 연상엽; born December 21, 1983), known professionally as Steven Yeun (/jʌn/ YUHN), is an American actor. He rose to prominence for playing Glenn Rhee in the television series The Walking Dead (2010–2016). He earned critical acclaim for the films Burning (2018) and Minari (2020). For the latter, he became the first East Asian-American nominated for the Academy Award for Best Actor. Time magazine named him one of the 100 most influential people in the world in 2021. For the Netflix dark comedy series Beef (2023), which he produced and starred in, Yeun received Primetime Emmy Awards for Outstanding Limited Series and Outstanding Lead Actor.

Yeun has also appeared in the films Okja (2017), Sorry to Bother You (2018), The Humans (2021), and Nope (2022). He has also voiced main characters in animated television series such as Voltron: Legendary Defender (2016–2018), Tales of Arcadia (2016–2021), Stretch Armstrong and the Flex Fighters (2017–2018), Final Space (2018–2021), Tuca & Bertie (2019–2022), and Invincible (2021–present).

== Early life and education ==
Yeun was born in Seoul on December 21, 1983, to Je and June Yeun. His father was an architect in South Korea before moving his family in 1988 to Canada, where they lived in Regina, Saskatchewan. In Regina, he attended Ruth M. Buck Elementary School. He has a younger brother named Brian. The family later moved to the U.S. and settled in Taylor, Michigan, and then Troy, Michigan, a Detroit suburb where Yeun lived until he graduated from Troy High School in 2001. Growing up, Yeun's family spoke Korean at home.

Yeun was raised in a Christian household. His parents, who owned beauty-supply stores in Detroit, began calling him "Steven" after meeting a doctor by that name. He received a bachelor's degree in psychology with a concentration in neuroscience from Kalamazoo College in 2005. At Kalamazoo, he befriended the sister of comedian Jordan Klepper and she took him to see Klepper's improv show, which inspired him to take his first acting class and later follow Klepper to Chicago, where they joined The Second City.

== Career ==
=== 2005–2009: Early career ===
Yeun revealed to his parents that he planned to pursue an improv career in Chicago instead of enrolling in law school or medical school. His parents were unhappy with the decision, but supported him nonetheless and gave him two years to pursue acting. He moved to Chicago in 2005, living in the city's Lincoln Square with his brother. Shortly after graduation, he joined Stir Friday Night, a Chicago-based Asian American sketch comedy troupe. Other alumni of the group include Danny Pudi, known for his role in Community. He joined The Second City in Chicago before moving to Los Angeles in October 2009.

=== 2010–2016: Breakout with The Walking Dead ===
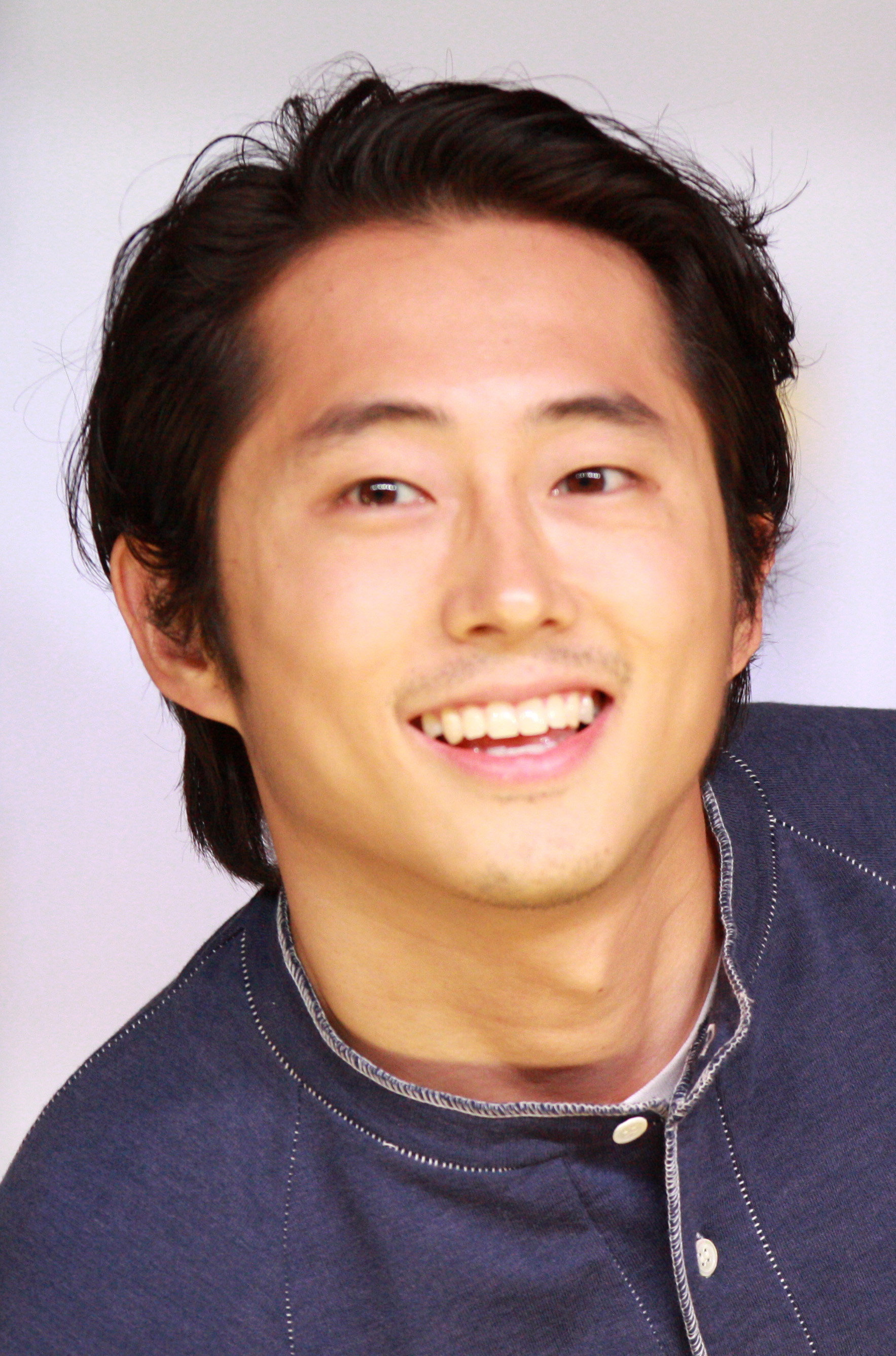
Yeun at the 2013 San Diego Comic-Con

Yeun's breakout role was the starring role of Glenn Rhee on The Walking Dead, an AMC television horror drama based on the comic book series of the same name. The series, which began in 2010, involves a group of characters who fight to survive in a violent apocalyptic world infested with flesh-eating zombies. The Walking Dead became the highest-rated series in cable television history, and seasons three through six of the show garnered the most 18 to 49-year-old viewers of any cable or broadcast television series. The series has received mostly positive reviews from professional television critics. Per Variety, Yeun was "a major part" of the show's success; his character developed "from a plucky young member of the show's central group to a bona fide action hero and sex symbol". Yeun left the show in 2016 after the season 7 premiere.

=== 2017–present: Transition to films and acclaim ===
Yeun was cast in Joe Lynch's action horror film Mayhem (2017). The film was released in theaters on November 10, 2017. In April 2016, Yeun was cast in Bong Joon-ho's action-adventure film Okja. The film competed for the Palme d'Or in the main competition section at the 2017 Cannes Film Festival. It was released on Netflix on June 28, 2017. Yeun also provided the voice of Bo in 2017's The Star. Yeun co-starred in Boots Riley's dark comedy Sorry to Bother You, alongside Lakeith Stanfield, Armie Hammer and Tessa Thompson, which was released in theaters on July 6, 2018. The film had its premiere at the Sundance Film Festival in January 2018. It additionally won The 2019 National Board of Review's Top Ten Independent Films award, as well as Best Screenplay and Best First Feature at the 2019 Independent Spirit Awards.

In late 2018, Yeun played Ben in the South Korean mystery drama film Burning, directed by Lee Chang-dong. The film was first unveiled at the 2018 Cannes Film Festival. His performance in the film was acclaimed. Yeun won Best Supporting Actor at the 2018 Los Angeles Film Critics Association Awards, Toronto Film Critics Association Awards 2018, Florida Film Critics Circle Awards 2018, and 2018 National Society of Film Critics Awards. In late 2018, Yeun landed a main role in an episode of Jordan Peele's revival of The Twilight Zone. He currently voices the title protagonist Mark Grayson in the animated superhero series Invincible, adapting Robert Kirkman's comic book series, which was released on Amazon Prime in March 2021.

In 2020, Yeun starred in and served as an executive producer for Lee Isaac Chung's A24 immigrant drama Minari, which also includes Youn Yuh-jung, Han Ye-ri, Alan Kim, Noel Kate Cho, Will Patton and Scott Haze among the cast. The film is about a Korean immigrant family becoming farmers in Arkansas; Yeun included his own immigrant experience in his acting. The film had its world premiere and won two top awards at the Sundance Film Festival in January 2020. Yeun received an Academy Award for Best Actor nomination for Minari. He also became the first Asian-American actor to be nominated at the Screen Actors Guild for Outstanding Performance by a Male Actor in a Leading Role.

Yeun does voice acting in both animated television series and films. Some of these roles include Avatar Wan in the second season of The Legend of Korra (2013), Steve Palchuk in Trollhunters (2016–2018) and 3Below (2018–2019), Keith in Voltron: Legendary Defender (2016–2018), Nathan Park/Wingspan in Stretch Armstrong and the Flex Fighters (2017–2018), Little Cato in Final Space, (2018–2021) and Speckle in Tuca & Bertie (2019–2022). It was later revealed that Yeun's role as Steve Palchuk would continue into Wizards, the third series of the Tales of Arcadia trilogy. The first season of 3Below was released on Netflix on December 21, 2018, and the second and final season was released on July 12, 2019.

In 2021, he was included in the Time 100, Time's annual list of the 100 most influential people in the world. In 2021, he co-starred alongside Jayne Houdyshell, Richard Jenkins and Amy Schumer, in Stephen Karam's award-winning one-act play adaptation The Humans. In 2022, he co-starred alongside Daniel Kaluuya and Keke Palmer in Jordan Peele's science fiction horror film Nope, as Ricky "Jupe" Park, the owner of the fictional theme park Jupiter's Claim.

In 2023, Yeun starred opposite Ali Wong in the Netflix dark comedy series Beef, for which he also served as executive producer. For his performance, he won a Primetime Emmy Award for Outstanding Lead Actor and a Golden Globe Award for Best Actor. He is the second person of Asian descent to win the Golden Globe Award in the category of best actor.

== Personal life ==
Yeun married photographer Joana Pak on December 3, 2016. They reside in Los Angeles and have two children together.

He is a longtime fan of the Detroit Pistons and Detroit Red Wings, and endorsed Andrew Yang for president in the 2020 U.S. election.

== Filmography ==
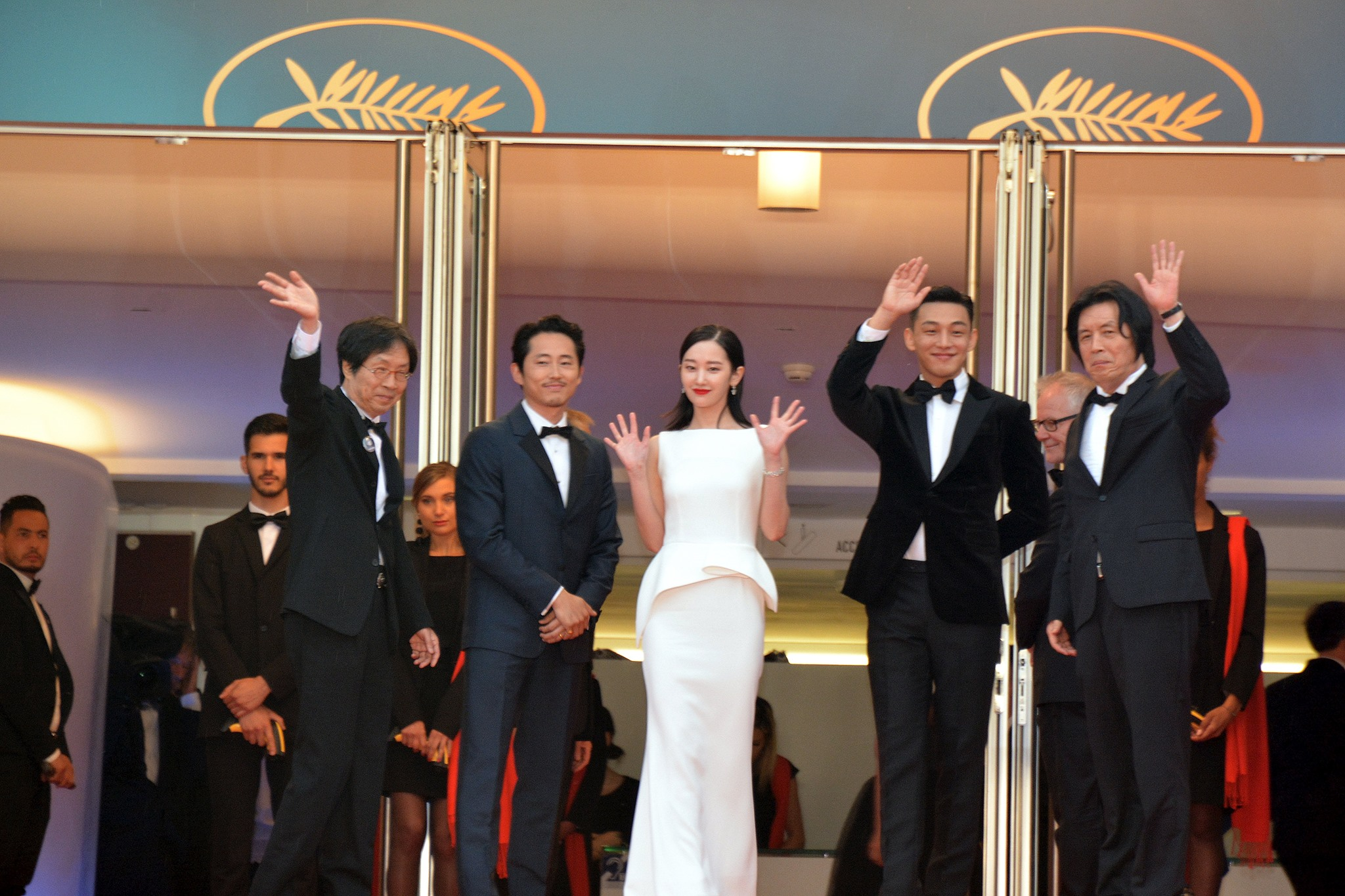
Yeun at 2018 Cannes Film Festival

=== Film ===
| Year | Title | Role | Notes | Ref. |
|---|---|---|---|---|
| 2009 | The Kari Files | Chip | Short film | |
| 2009 | My Name Is Jerry | Chaz | | |
| 2010 | Carpe Millennium | Kevin | Short film | |
| 2010 | Blowout Sale | Customer | Short film | |
| 2014 | I Origins | Kenny | | |
| 2015 | Like a French Film | Steve | | |
| 2017 | Okja | K | | |
| 2017 | Mayhem | Derek Cho | | |
| 2017 | The Star | Bo | Voice | |
| 2018 | Sorry to Bother You | Squeeze | | |
| 2018 | Burning | Ben | | |
| 2019 | Naysayer | Ian | Short film | |
| 2020 | Minari | Jacob Yi | Also executive producer | |
| 2021 | Space Jam: A New Legacy | Warner Bros. Executive | Cameo appearance | |
| 2021 | Trollhunters: Rise of the Titans | Steve Palchuk | Voice | |
| 2021 | The Humans | Richard | | |
| 2022 | Nope | Ricky "Jupe" Park | | |
| 2024 | Love Me | Iam / Liam | | |
| 2025 | Bubble & Squeak | Bkofl | Also producer | |
| 2025 | Mickey 17 | Timo | | |
| 2025 | Crash Site | Max | Short film | |
| 2026 | The Rip | Det. Mike Ro | | |
| 2026 | Avatar Aang: The Last Airbender | Zuko | Voice | |
| 2026 | Animals | Sam Allison | | |

=== Television ===
| Year | Title | Role | Notes | Ref. |
|---|---|---|---|---|
| 2010 | The Big Bang Theory | Sebastian | Episode: "The Staircase Implementation" | |
| 2010–2016 | The Walking Dead | Glenn Rhee | 73 episodes | |
| 2011 | Law & Order: LA | Ken Hasui | Episode: "Hayden Tract" | |
| 2011 | Warehouse 13 | Gibson Rice | Episode: "Don't Hate the Player" | |
| 2012 | NTSF:SD:SUV:: | Ricky Meeker | Episode: "16 Hop Street" | |
| 2012 | Harder Than it Looks | Steven | Episode: "Lockdown" | |
| 2013 | The Legend of Korra | Avatar Wan | Voice, 3 episodes | |
| 2013 | Filthy Preppy Teen$ | Martin | Pilot | |
| 2014 | Drunk History | Daniel Inouye | Episode: "Hawaii" | |
| 2014 | American Dad! | Charles | Voice, episode: "Blagsnarst, a Love Story" | |
| 2014 | Comedy Bang! Bang! | Himself | Episode: "Steven Yeun Wears Rolled Up Black Jeans & No Socks" | |
| 2016–2018 | Voltron: Legendary Defender | Keith | Voice, 64 episodes | |
| 2016–2018 | Trollhunters: Tales of Arcadia | Steve Palchuk | Voice, 28 episodes | |
| 2017–2018 | Stretch Armstrong and the Flex Fighters | Nathan Park / Wingspan additional voices | Voice, 24 episodes | |
| 2017 | Bajillion Dollar Propertie$ | Eric | Episode: "Disaster Drills" | |
| 2017 | Robot Chicken | Glenn Rhee | Voice, episode: "The Robot Chicken Walking Dead Special: Look Who's Walking" | |
| 2018–2021 | Final Space | Little Cato; Additional voices | Voice, 36 episodes | |
| 2018–2019 | 3Below: Tales of Arcadia | Steve Palchuk | Voice, 19 episodes | |
| 2019 | Weird City | Barsley | Episode: "Chonathan & Mulia & Barsley & Phephanie" | |
| 2019 | The Twilight Zone | A. Traveler | Episode: "A Traveler" | |
| 2019 | I Think You Should Leave with Tim Robinson | Jacob | Episode: "Has This Ever Happened To You?" | |
| 2019–2022 | Tuca & Bertie | Speckle | Voice, 30 episodes, also producer | |
| 2020 | Wizards: Tales of Arcadia | Steve Palchuk | Voice, 10 episodes | |
| 2021–present | Invincible | Mark Grayson / Invincible | Voice, 31 episodes | |
| 2023 | Beef | Danny Cho | Main role, also executive producer | |

=== Music video appearances ===
| Year | Title | Artist |
|---|---|---|
| 2016 | "Fire" | Park Jin-young (feat. Conan O'Brien & Jamie) |

=== Video games ===
| Year | Title | Role | Notes |
|---|---|---|---|
| 2007 | Crysis | North Korean soldier 2 | Voice |
| 2008 | Crysis Warhead | North Korean soldier 2 | Voice |
| 2017 | DreamWorks Voltron VR Chronicles | Keith | Voice |

== Awards and nominations ==
Over his career, Yeun has received numerous accolades. For his leading performance in Minari (2020) he received a nomination for the Academy Award, Independent Spirit Award, and Screen Actors Guild Award for Best Actor. For his work on Beef (2023) he received two Primetime Emmy Awards, a Golden Globe Award, and two Critics' Choice Television Awards as well as nominations for two Independent Spirit Awards and a Screen Actors Guild Award.

== See also ==
- List of Academy Award winners and nominees of Asian descent
- List of South Korean Academy Award winners and nominees
- List of Primetime Emmy Award winners
- List of Golden Globe winners
