= List of Academy Award winners and nominees from South Korea =

List of South Korean Academy Award winners and nominees
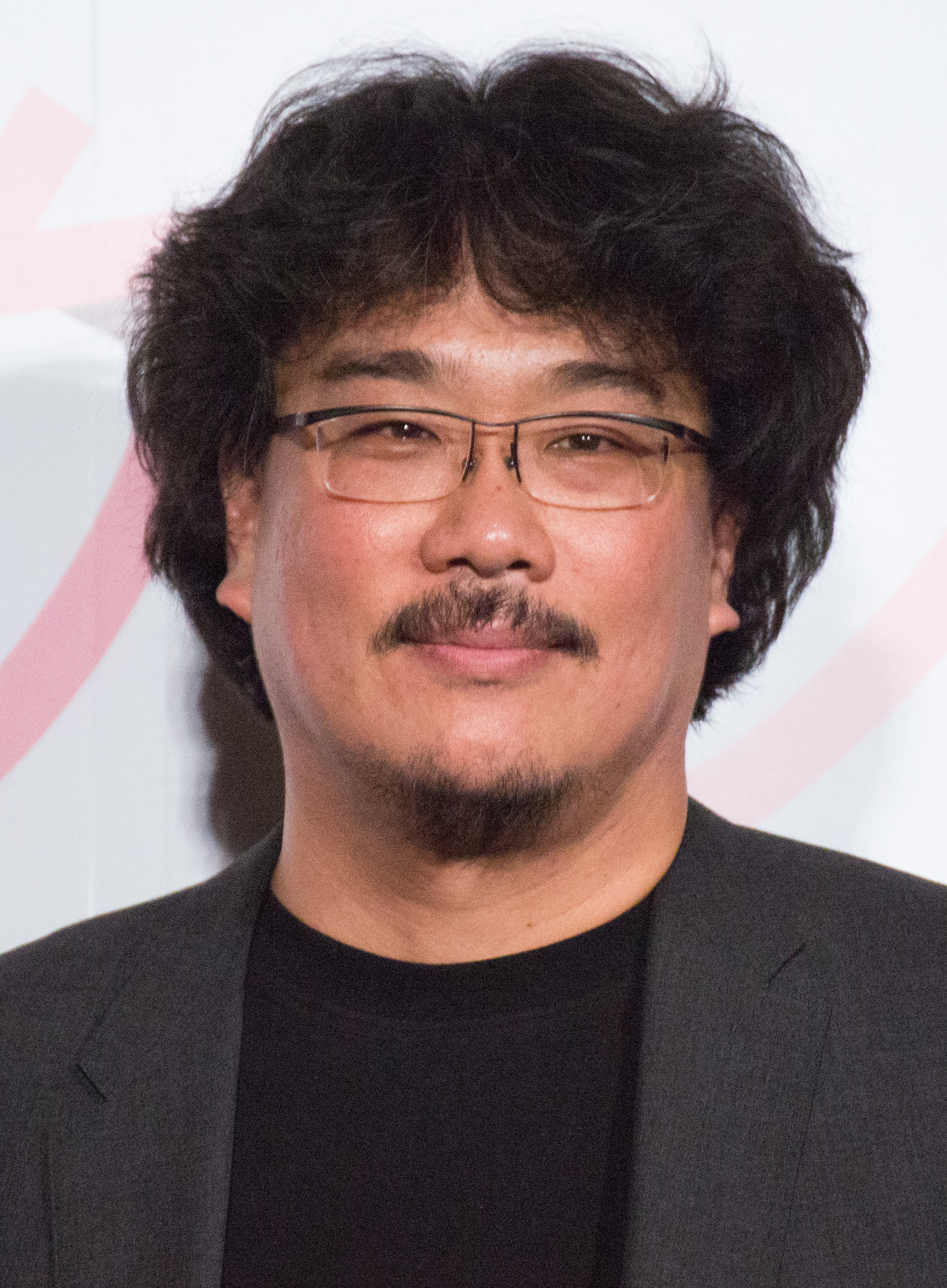
- Bong Joon-ho (pictured in 2017) has won three Academy Awards, the most out of all South Koreans.
Awards and nominations
| Award | Wins | Nominations |
| Picture | 1 | 2 |
| Director | 1 | 2 |
| Actor | 0 | 1 |
| Supporting Actress | 1 | 1 |
| Original Screenplay | 1 | 3 |
| Documentary Feature | 0 | 2 |
| Documentary Short Subject | 0 | 3 |
| Animated Feature | 0 | 2 |
| Animated Short Film | 0 | 2 |
| International Feature Film | 1 | 1 |
| Film Editing | 0 | 1 |
| Production Design | 0 | 1 |
| Original Song | 0 | 1 |

Totals (Note: Certain award groups do not simply award one winner. They acknowledge several different recipients, have runners-up, and have third place. Since this is a specific recognition and is different from losing an award, runner-up mentions are considered wins in this award tally. For simplification and to avoid errors, each award in this list has been presumed to have had a prior nomination.)
- Wins: 5
- Nominations: 24

This list details South Koreans working in the film industry who have been nominated for, or won, Academy Awards (also known as Oscars). These include artists and filmmakers, both naturalized and diaspora, or South Korean film production companies. North Korea has never sought to participate in the awards due to tensions with the United States and South Korea.

South Koreans had not received any nominations for almost six decades following the inauguration launch of Academy Award, until Christine Choy was nominated in 1988. In 2004, Sejong Park was the second.

In the late 2010s, South Korean consecutive entrants Chang-dong's Burning and Joon-ho's Parasite shortlisted the International Feature Film category: The former became the first to make it to the final nine-film shortlist of the 91st Academy Awards for Best International Feature Film but it didn't make for the nomination. The latter became the first South Korean film to earn a nomination for Best International Feature Film, but not limited to; it also was the first South Korean film to be nominated for Best Picture, Best Director, Best Original Screenplay, Best Film Editing, and Best Production Design; it won all the first four including Best Picture.

Out of eleven non-English international films who have been previously nominated for, Parasite is the first non-English language film ever to win Best Picture, established in 2019/2020, emerge a global phenomenon to the new wave of South Korean culture and interests at the start of the 2020s.

== Production ==
=== Best Picture ===
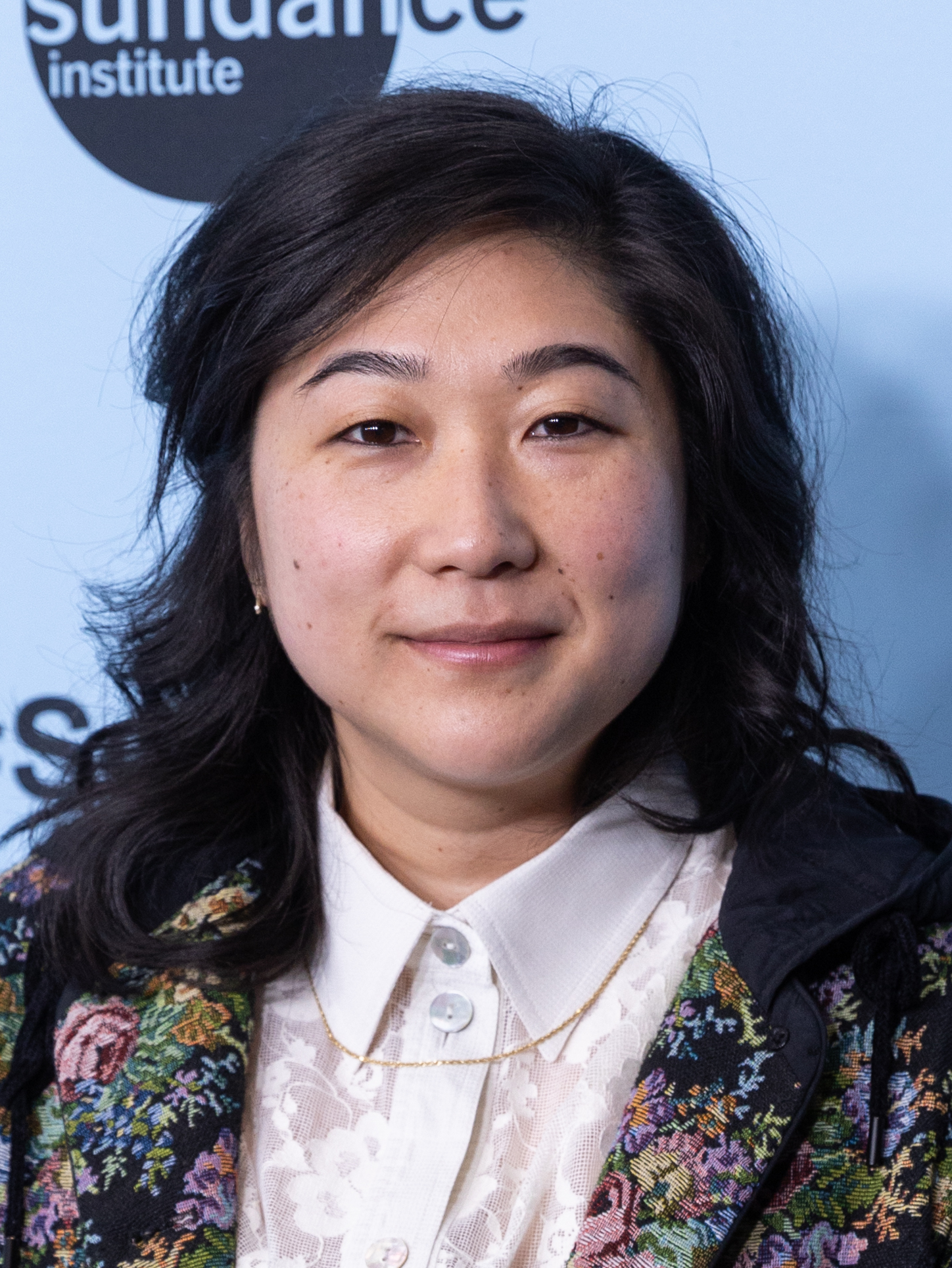
Christina Oh was nominated for Best Picture category for producing Minari (2020).

Best Picture
| Year | Film | Nominee | Status | Milestone / Notes |
| 2019 (92nd) | Parasite | Bong Joon-ho; Kwak Sin-ae | Won | First East Asians to win Best Picture. First non-English language film to win Best Picture. |
| 2020 (93rd) | Minari | Christina Oh | Nominated | South Korean-American. |

=== Best Documentary Feature ===
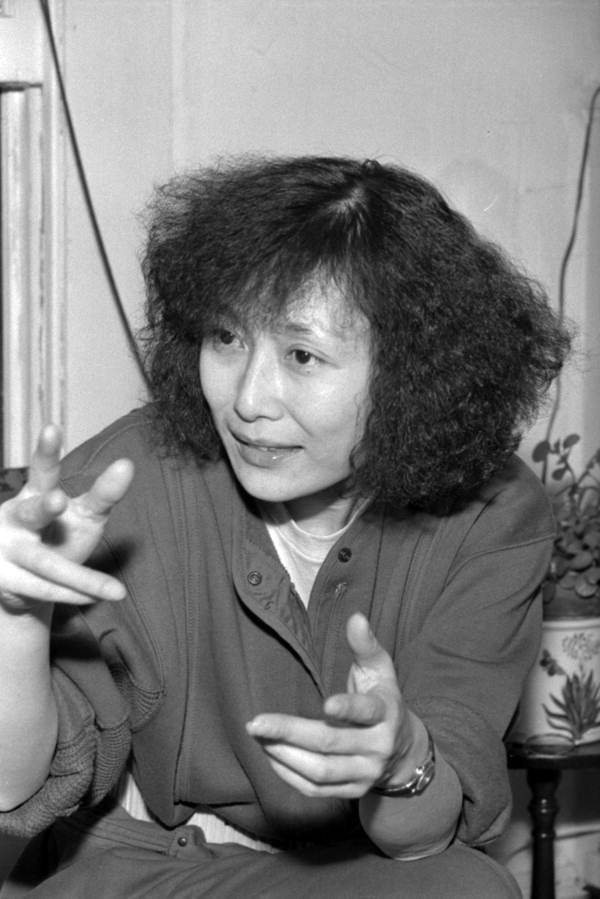
Christine Choy, who is half-Korean through her father, was nominated for Best Documentary Feature category.

Documentary Feature
| Year | Name | Film | Status | Milestone / Notes |
| 1988 (61st) | Christine Choy | Who Killed Vincent Chin? | Nominated | Choi is American born of Korean and Chinese descent. |
| 2018 (91st) | Su Kim | Hale County This Morning, This Evening | Nominated | Kim is American born of Korean descent. (Shared with RaMell Ross and Joslyn Barnes.) |

=== Best Documentary Short Subject ===
Documentary Short Subject
| Year | Name | Film | Status | Milestone / Notes |
| 2019 (92nd) | Yi Seung-Jun | In the Absence | Nominated | |
| 2019 (92nd) | Gary Byung-Seok Kam | In the Absence | Nominated | |

=== Best Animated Feature ===
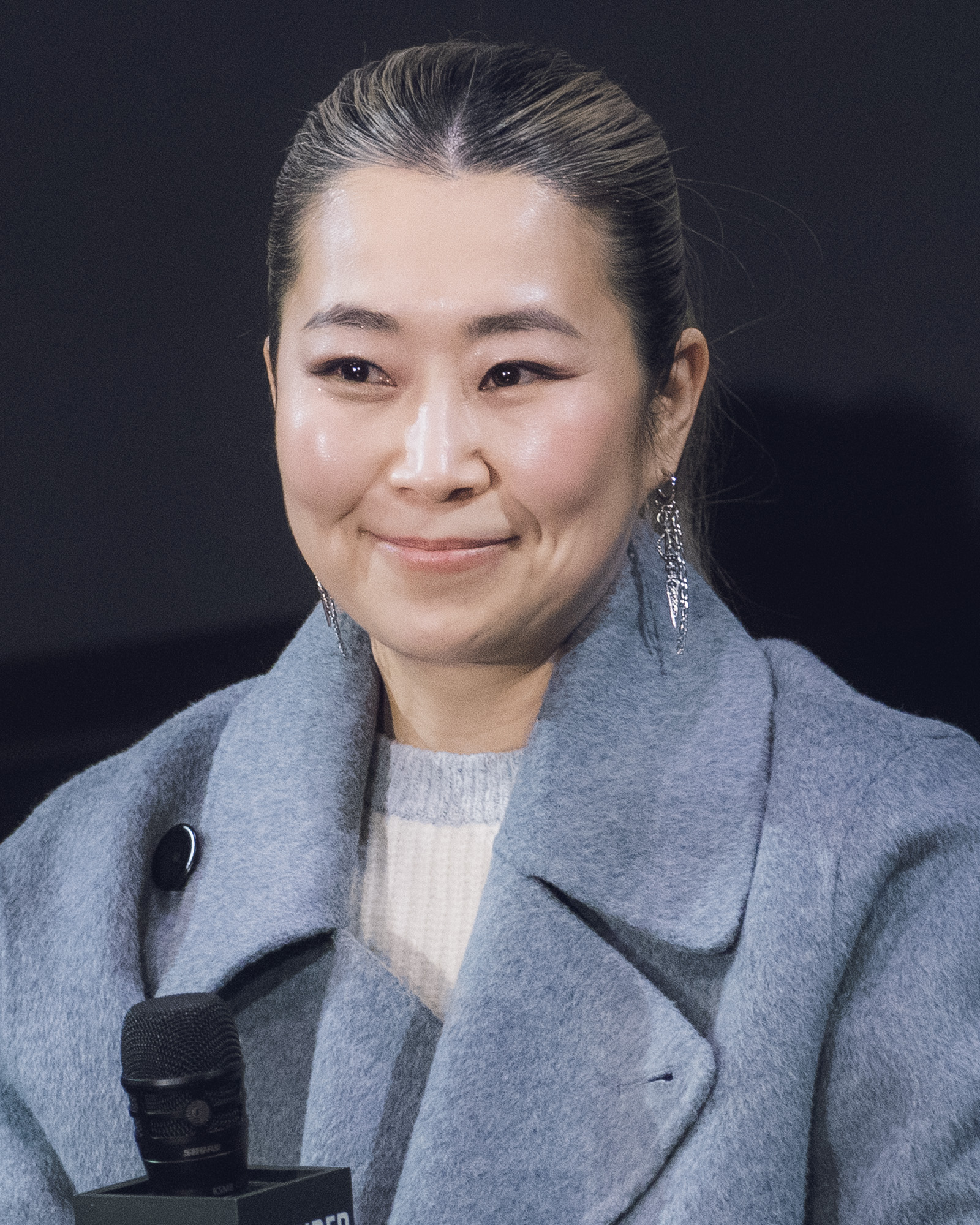
Maggie Kang co-won the Best Animated Feature category.

Best Animated Feature
| Year | Name | Film | Status | Milestone / Notes |
| 2011 (84th) | Jennifer Yuh Nelson | Kung Fu Panda 2 | Nominated | First woman of color to be nominated for Best Animated Feature category. |
| 2023 (96th) | Peter Sohn | Elemental | Nominated | |
| 2025 (98th) | Maggie Kang | KPop Demon Hunters | Won | Shared with Chris Appelhans and Michelle L.M. Wong |

=== Best Animated Short Film ===
Animated Short Film
| Year | Name | Film | Status | Milestone / Notes |
| 2004 (77th) | Sejong Park | Birthday Boy | Nominated | Australian born of Korean descent. |
| 2011 (84th) | Minkyu Lee | Adam and Dog | Nominated | |
| 2020 (93rd) | Erick Oh | Opera | Nominated | American born of Korean descent. |

=== Best International Feature Film ===
NOTE: In this category is awarded to countries, not individuals. This list contains directors of nominated films, who typically accept the award on behalf of their country.

International Feature Film
| Year | Film | Director | Status | Milestone / Notes |
| 2019 (92nd) | Parasite (Gisaengchung) 기생충 | Bong Joon-ho | Won | First South Korean film to be nominated for and to win Best Foreign Language Film. |

== Performance ==
=== Best Actor ===
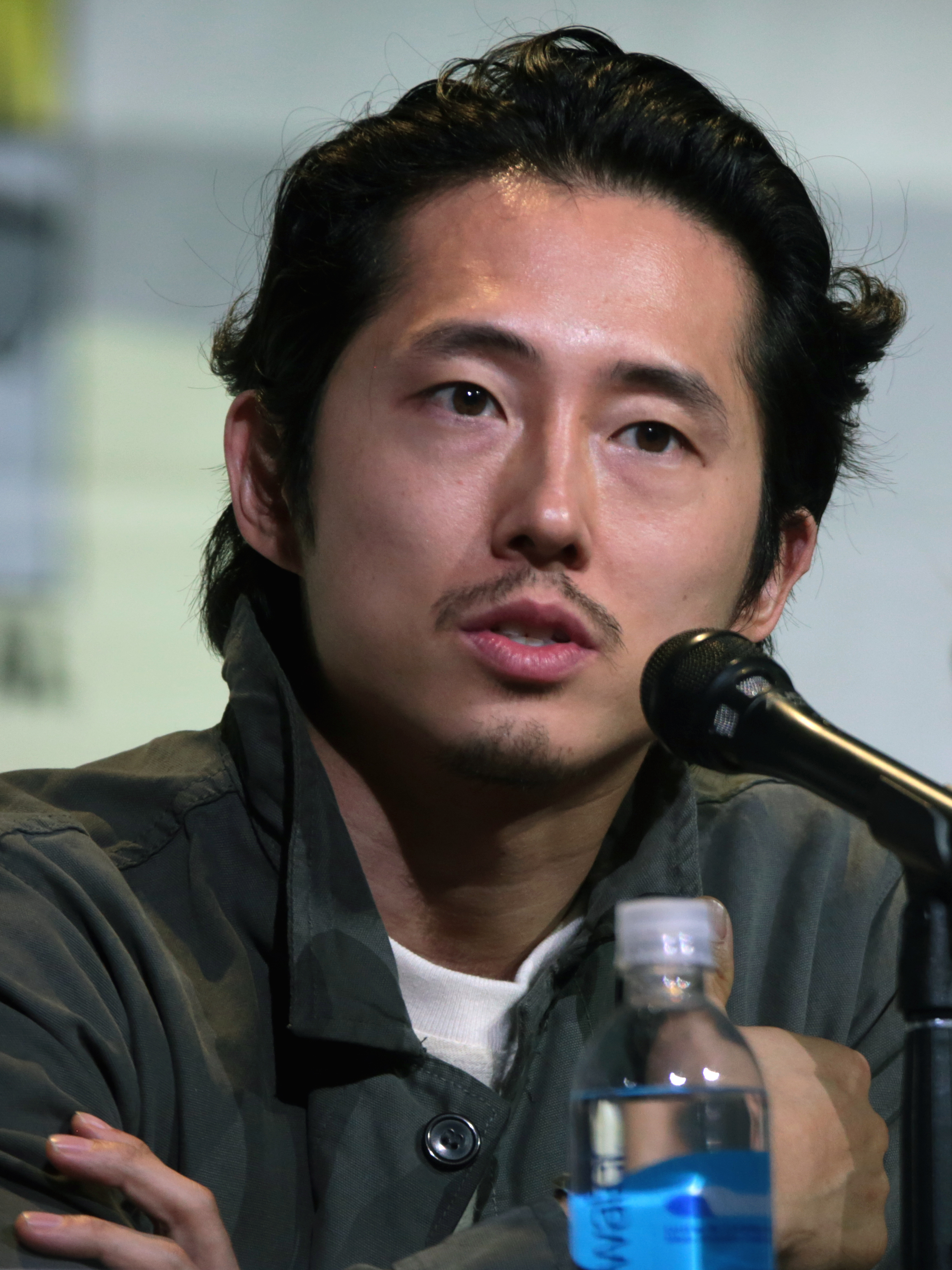
Steven Yeun (pictured in 2016) was nominated for Best Actor category.

Actor in a Leading Role
| Year | Name | Film | Role | Status | Milestone / Notes |
| 2020 (93rd) | Steven Yeun | Minari | Jacob Yi | Nominated | First East Asian and Asian American actor to be nominated for Best Actor. |

=== Best Supporting Actress ===
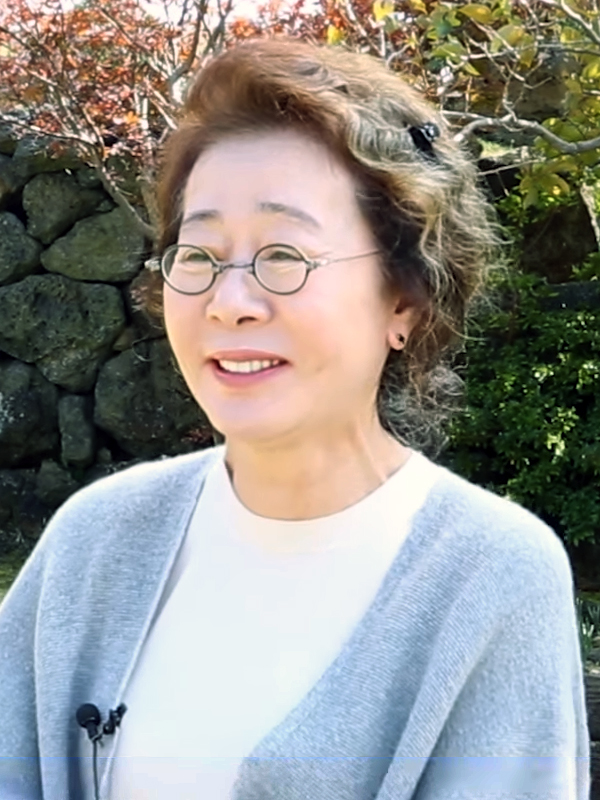
Youn Yuh-jung (pictured in 2016) was the second Asian actress to win behind Japanese actress Miyoshi Umeki, and the first Korean to do so.

Actress in a Supporting Role
| Year | Name | Film | Role | Status | Milestone / Notes |
| 2020 (93rd) | Youn Yuh-jung | Minari | Soon-ja | Won | First Korean actress to win an acting award. |

== Craft ==
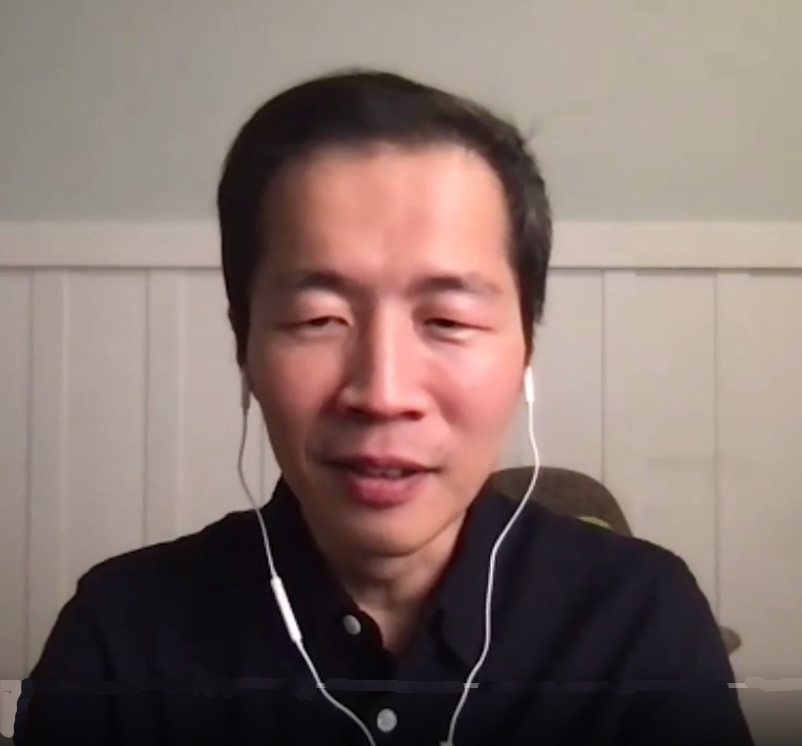
South Korean-American Lee Isaac Chung was nominated for Best Director category.

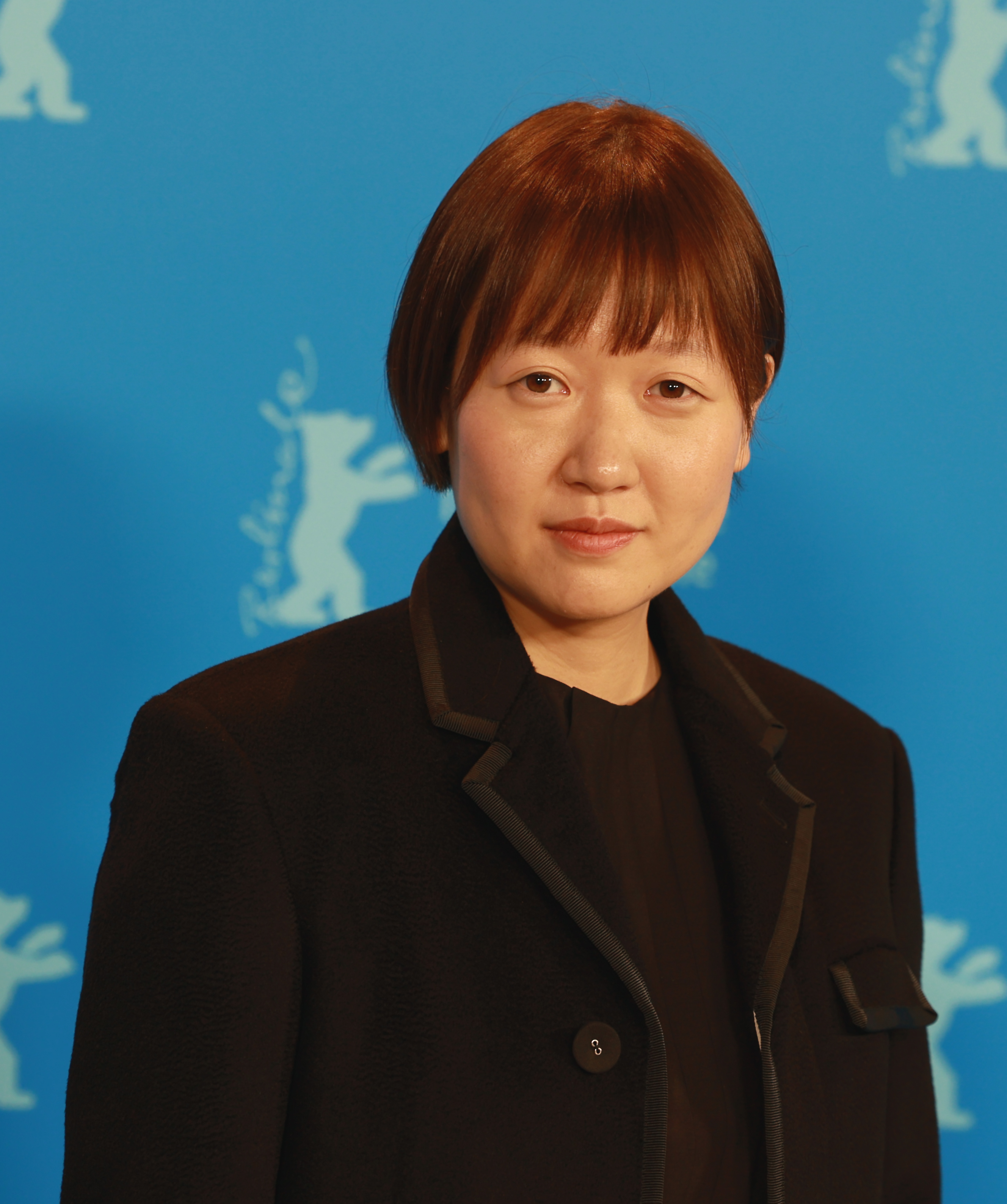
South Korean-Canadian Celine Song was nominated for Best Original Screenplay category.

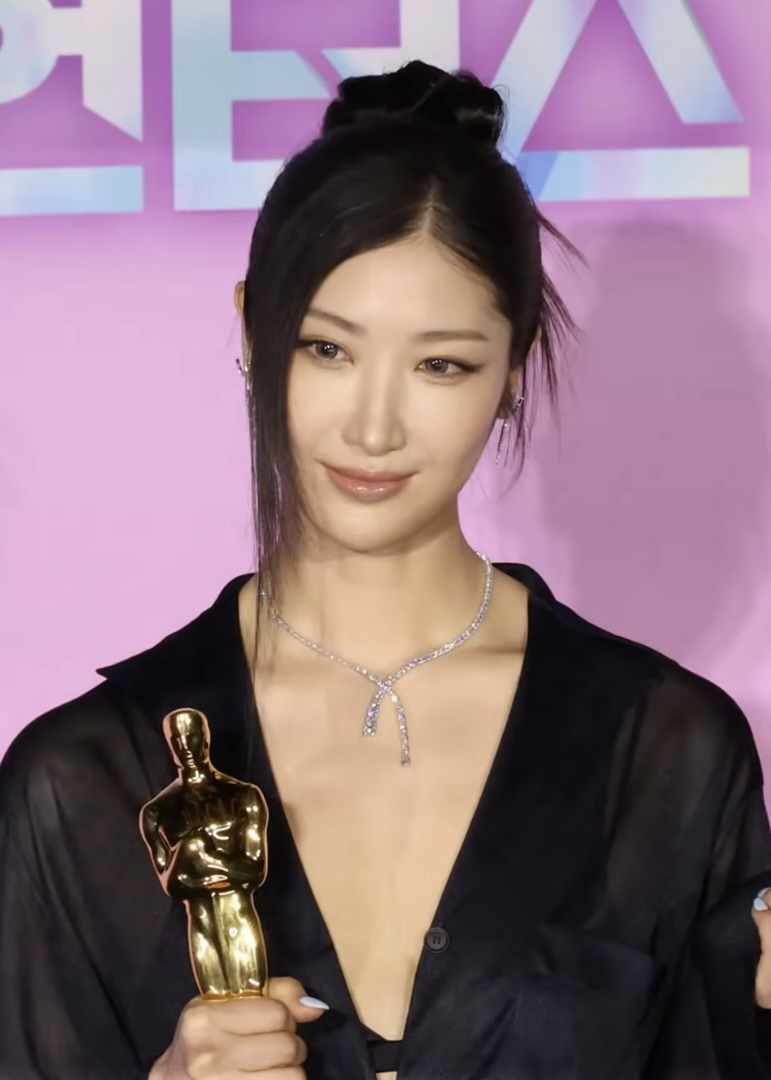
Ejae co-won the Best Original Song category.

=== Best Director ===
Director
| Year | Name | Film | Status | Milestone / Notes |
| 2019 (92nd) | Bong Joon-ho | Parasite | Won | First Korean to be nominated and win. Second director to win for a non-English language film. |
| 2020 (93rd) | Lee Isaac Chung | Minari | Nominated | South Korean-American. |

=== Best Original Screenplay ===
Original Screenplay
| Year | Name | Film | Status | Milestone / Notes |
| 2019 (92nd) | Bong Joon-ho; Han Jin-won | Parasite | Won | First Asian writers to win any screenwriting Academy Award. |
| 2020 (93rd) | Lee Isaac Chung | Minari | Nominated | South Korean-American. |
| 2023 (96th) | Celine Song | Past Lives | Nominated | South Korean-Canadian. |

=== Best Film Editing ===
Film Editing
| Year | Name | Film | Status | Milestone / Notes |
| 2019 (92nd) | Yang Jin-mo | Parasite | Nominated | |

=== Best Production Design ===
Production Design
| Year | Name | Film | Status | Milestone / Notes |
| 2019 (92nd) | Lee Ha-jun; Cho Won-woo | Parasite | Nominated | |

=== Best Original Song ===
Original Song
| Year | Name | Film | Song | Status | Milestone / Notes |
| 2013 (86th) | Karen O | Her | "The Moon Song" | Nominated | American citizen of Polish and South Korean descent |
| 2025 (98th) | Ejae; 24; Ido; Teddy | KPop Demon Hunters | "Golden" | Won | Shared with Mark Sonnenblick and Ian Eisendrath |
