= BAFTA Award for Best Makeup and Hair =

British film industry award

BAFTA Award for Best Make Up and Hair
- Awarded for: Make Up & Hair
- Location: United Kingdom
- Presented by: British Academy of Film and Television Arts
- Currently held by: Jordan Samuel, Cliona Furey, Mike Hill and Megan Many for Frankenstein (2025)
- Website: https://www.bafta.org

The BAFTA Award for Best Make Up and Hair is a film award presented by the British Academy of Film and Television Arts (BAFTA) at the annual British Academy Film Awards, in recognition of make-up artists and hairstylists who have delivered outstanding makeup and hairstyling in a film.

BAFTA is a British organisation that hosts annual awards shows for film, television, and video games (and formerly also for children's film and television). Since 1982, selected make-up artists and hairstylists have been awarded with the BAFTA award for Best Make Up and Hair at an annual ceremony.

In the following lists, the titles and names in bold with a gold background are the winners and recipients respectively; those not in bold are the nominees. The years given are those in which the films under consideration were released, not the year of the ceremony, which always takes place the following year.

== Winners and nominees ==
indicates the winner

=== 1980s ===
Year	Film	Recipient(s)
Best Make-Up Artist
**1982** (36th)	**Quest for Fire**	**Sarah Monzani, Christopher Tucker and Michèle Burke**
**1982** (36th)	Blade Runner	Marvin Westmore
**1982** (36th)	E.T. the Extra-Terrestrial	Robert Sidell
**1982** (36th)	Gandhi	Tom Smith
**1983** (37th)	**Tootsie**	**Dorothy Pearl, George Masters, C. Romania Ford and Allen Weisinger**
**1983** (37th)	Heat and Dust	Gordon Kay
**1983** (37th)	Return of the Jedi	Phil Tippett and Stuart Freeborn
**1983** (37th)	Zelig	Fern Buchner and John Caglione Jr.
**1984** (38th)	**Greystoke: The Legend of Tarzan, Lord of the Apes**	**Paul Engelen, Peter Frampton, Rick Baker and Joan Hills**
**1984** (38th)	The Company of Wolves	Jane Royle and Christopher Tucker
**1984** (38th)	The Dresser	Alan Boyle
**1984** (38th)	The Killing Fields	Tommie Manderson
**1985** (39th)	**Amadeus**	**Paul LeBlanc and Dick Smith**
**1985** (39th)	The Emerald Forest	Peter Frampton, Paul Engelen, Anna Dryhurst, Luis Michelotti and Beth Presares
**1985** (39th)	Legend	Peter Robb-King and Rob Bottin
**1985** (39th)	Mask	Michael Westmore
**1986** (40th)	**Ran**	**Tameyuki Aimi, Shohichiro Meda, Chihako Naito and Noriko Takamizawa**
**1986** (40th)	Aliens	Peter Robb-King
**1986** (40th)	Dreamchild	Jenny Shircore
**1986** (40th)	Sid and Nancy	Peter Frampton
**1987** (41st)	**The Name of the Rose**	**Hasso von Hugo**
**1987** (41st)	The Fly	Chris Walas and Stephan Dupuis
**1987** (41st)	Hope and Glory	Anna Dryhurst
**1987** (41st)	Jean de Florette	Michèle Dernelle and Jean-Pierre Eychenne
**1988** (42nd)	**The Last Emperor**	**Fabrizio Sforza**
**1988** (42nd)	Beetlejuice	Ve Neill, Steve La Porte and Robert Short
**1988** (42nd)	A Handful of Dust	Sally Sutton
**1988** (42nd)	RoboCop	Carla Palmer
**1989** (43rd)	**The Adventures of Baron Munchausen**	**Maggie Weston, Fabrizio Sforza and Pam Meager**
**1989** (43rd)	Batman	Paul Engelen and Nick Dudman
**1989** (43rd)	Dangerous Liaisons	Jean-Luc Russier
**1989** (43rd)	My Left Foot	Ken Jennings

=== 1990s ===
Year	Film	Recipient(s)
**1990** (44th)	**Dick Tracy**	**John Caglione Jr. and Doug Drexler**
**1990** (44th)	Cinema Paradiso	Maurizio Trani
**1990** (44th)	Ghost	Ben Nye Jr.
**1990** (44th)	The Witches	Christine Beveridge and The Jim Henson Creature Shop
Best Make-Up
**1991** (45th)	**Cyrano de Bergerac**	**Jean-Pierre Eychenne and Michèle Burke**
**1991** (45th)	The Addams Family	Fern Buchner, Katherine James and Kevin Haney
**1991** (45th)	Dances with Wolves	Francisco X. Pérez
**1991** (45th)	Edward Scissorhands	Ve Neill
**1992** (46th)	**The Last of the Mohicans**	**Peter Robb-King**
**1992** (46th)	Batman Returns	Ve Neill and Stan Winston
**1992** (46th)	Chaplin	Wally Schneiderman, Jill Rockow and John Caglione Jr.
**1992** (46th)	Howards End	Christine Beveridge
**1993** (47th)	**Orlando**	**Morag Ross**
**1993** (47th)	Addams Family Values	Kevin Haney, Katherine James, Fred C. Blau Jr. and Fern Buchner
**1993** (47th)	Bram Stoker's Dracula	Greg Cannom, Michèle Burke and Matthew W. Mungle
**1993** (47th)	Schindler's List	Christina Smith, Matthew W. Mungle, Waldemar Pokromski and Pauline Heys
Best Make-Up and Hair
**1994** (48th)	**The Adventures of Priscilla, Queen of the Desert**	**Cassie Hanlon, Angela Conte and Strykermeyer**
**1994** (48th)	Interview with the Vampire	Stan Winston, Michèle Burke and Jan Archibald
**1994** (48th)	The Mask	Greg Cannom and Sheryl Leigh Ptak
**1994** (48th)	Mrs. Doubtfire	Greg Cannom, Ve Neill and Yolanda Toussieng
**1995** (49th)	**The Madness of King George**	**Lisa Westcott**
**1995** (49th)	Braveheart	Peter Frampton, Paul Pattison and Lois Burwell
**1995** (49th)	Ed Wood	Ve Neill, Rick Baker and Yolanda Toussieng
**1995** (49th)	Sense and Sensibility	Morag Ross and Jan Archibald
**1996** (50th)	**The Nutty Professor**	**Rick Baker and David LeRoy Anderson**
**1996** (50th)	101 Dalmatians	Lynda Armstrong, Martial Corneville, Colin Jamison, Paul Huntley and Jean-Luc Russier
**1996** (50th)	The English Patient	Fabrizio Sforza and Nigel Booth
**1996** (50th)	Evita	Sarah Monzani and Martin Samuel
**1997** (51st)	**The Wings of the Dove**	**Sallie Jaye and Jan Archibald**
**1997** (51st)	L.A. Confidential	John M. Elliott Jr., Scott H. Eddo and Janis Clark
**1997** (51st)	Mrs Brown	Lisa Westcott
**1997** (51st)	Titanic	Tina Earnshaw, Simon Thompson, Kay Georgiou and Greg Cannom
**1998** (52nd)	**Elizabeth**	**Jenny Shircore**
**1998** (52nd)	Saving Private Ryan	Lois Burwell and Jeanette Freeman
**1998** (52nd)	Shakespeare in Love	Lisa Westcott
**1998** (52nd)	Velvet Goldmine	Peter Swords King
**1999** (53rd)	**Topsy-Turvy**	**Christine Blundell**
**1999** (53rd)	American Beauty	Tania McComas and Carol A. O'Connell
**1999** (53rd)	The End of the Affair	Christine Beveridge
**1999** (53rd)	An Ideal Husband	Peter Swords King

=== 2000s ===
Year	Film	Recipient(s)
**2000** (54th)	**How the Grinch Stole Christmas**	**Rick Baker, Toni G, Sylvia Nava, Gail Ryan and Kazuhiro Tsuji**
**2000** (54th)	Chocolat	Naomi Donne
**2000** (54th)	Crouching Tiger, Hidden Dragon	Man Yun Ling and Chau Siu Mui
**2000** (54th)	Gladiator	Paul Engelen and Graham Johnston
**2000** (54th)	Quills	Peter Swords King and Nuala Conway
**2001** (55th)	**The Lord of the Rings: The Fellowship of the Ring**	**Peter Swords King, Peter Owen and Richard Taylor**
**2001** (55th)	Gosford Park	Jan Archibald and Sallie Jaye
**2001** (55th)	Harry Potter and the Philosopher's Stone	Nick Dudman, Eithne Fennel and Amanda Knight
**2001** (55th)	Moulin Rouge!	Maurizio Silvi and Aldo Signoretti
**2001** (55th)	Planet of the Apes	Rick Baker, Toni G and Kazuhiro Tsuji
**2002** (56th)	**Frida**	**Judy Chin, Beatrice De Alba, John E. Jackson and Regina Reyes**
**2002** (56th)	Chicago	Judi Cooper-Sealy and Jordan Samuel
**2002** (56th)	Gangs of New York	Manlio Rocchetti and Aldo Signoretti
**2002** (56th)	The Hours	Jo Allen, Conor O'Sullivan and Ivana Primorac
**2002** (56th)	The Lord of the Rings: The Two Towers	Peter Swords King, Peter Owen and Richard Taylor
**2003** (57th)	**Pirates of the Caribbean: The Curse of the Black Pearl**	**Ve Neill and Martin Samuel**
**2003** (57th)	Big Fish	Jean Ann Black and Paul LeBlanc
**2003** (57th)	Cold Mountain	Paul Engelen and Ivana Primorac
**2003** (57th)	Girl with a Pearl Earring	Jenny Shircore
**2003** (57th)	The Lord of the Rings: The Return of the King	Peter Swords King, Peter Owen and Richard Taylor
**2004** (58th)	**The Aviator**	**Kathryn Blondell, Siân Grigg and Morag Ross**
**2004** (58th)	Finding Neverland	Christine Blundell
**2004** (58th)	Harry Potter and the Prisoner of Azkaban	Nick Dudman, Eithne Fennel and Amanda Knight
**2004** (58th)	House of Flying Daggers	Kwan Lee-Na, Chau Siu-Mui and Yang Xiaohai
**2004** (58th)	Vera Drake	Christine Blundell
**2005** (59th)	**The Chronicles of Narnia: The Lion, the Witch and the Wardrobe**	**Howard Berger, Nikki Gooley and Greg Nicotero**
**2005** (59th)	Charlie and the Chocolate Factory	Peter Owen and Ivana Primorac
**2005** (59th)	Harry Potter and the Goblet of Fire	Nick Dudman, Eithne Fennel and Amanda Knight
**2005** (59th)	Memoirs of a Geisha	Kate Biscoe, Lyndell Quiyou, Kelvin R. Trahan and Noriko Watanabe
**2005** (59th)	Pride & Prejudice	Fae Hammond
**2006** (60th)	**Pan's Labyrinth**	**José Quetglás and Blanca Sánchez**
**2006** (60th)	The Devil Wears Prada	Angel De Angelis and Nicki Ledermann
**2006** (60th)	Marie Antoinette	Desiree Corridoni and Jean-Luc Russier
**2006** (60th)	Pirates of the Caribbean: Dead Man's Chest	Ve Neill and Martin Samuel
**2006** (60th)	The Queen	Daniel Phillips
**2007** (61st)	**La Vie en Rose**	**Jan Archibald and Didier Lavergne**
**2007** (61st)	Atonement	Ivana Primorac
**2007** (61st)	Elizabeth: The Golden Age	Jenny Shircore
**2007** (61st)	Hairspray	Judi Cooper-Sealy and Jordan Samuel
**2007** (61st)	Sweeney Todd: The Demon Barber of Fleet Street	Ivana Primorac and Peter Owen
**2008** (62nd)	**The Curious Case of Benjamin Button**	**Jean Ann Black and Colleen Callaghan**
**2008** (62nd)	The Dark Knight	Peter Robb-King
**2008** (62nd)	The Duchess	Jan Archibald and Daniel Phillips
**2008** (62nd)	Frost/Nixon	Edouard F. Henriques and Kim Santantonio
**2008** (62nd)	Milk	Steven E. Anderson and Michael White
**2009** (63rd)	**The Young Victoria**	**Jenny Shircore**
**2009** (63rd)	Coco Before Chanel	Madeleine Cofano, Jane Milon and Thi Thanh Tu Nguyen
**2009** (63rd)	An Education	Elizabeth Yianni-Georgiou
**2009** (63rd)	The Imaginarium of Doctor Parnassus	Sarah Monzani
**2009** (63rd)	Nine	Peter Swords King

=== 2010s ===
Year	Film	Recipient(s)
**2010** (64th)	**Alice in Wonderland**	**Valli O'Reilly and Paul Gooch**
**2010** (64th)	Black Swan	Judy Chin and Geordie Sheffer
**2010** (64th)	Harry Potter and the Deathly Hallows – Part 1	Nick Dudman, Amanda Knight and Lisa Tomblin
**2010** (64th)	The King's Speech	Frances Hannon
**2010** (64th)	Made in Dagenham	Elizabeth Yianni-Georgiou
**2011** (65th)	**The Iron Lady**	**Marese Langan, J. Roy Helland and Mark Coulier**
**2011** (65th)	The Artist	Cydney Cornell and Julie Hewett
**2011** (65th)	Harry Potter and the Deathly Hallows – Part 2	Nick Dudman, Amanda Knight and Lisa Tomblin
**2011** (65th)	Hugo	Jan Archibald and Morag Ross
**2011** (65th)	My Week with Marilyn	Jenny Shircore
**2012** (66th)	**Les Misérables**	**Lisa Westcott**
**2012** (66th)	Anna Karenina	Ivana Primorac
**2012** (66th)	Hitchcock	Julie Hewett, Martin Samuel and Howard Berger
**2012** (66th)	The Hobbit: An Unexpected Journey	Peter Swords King, Richard Taylor and Rick Findlater
**2012** (66th)	Lincoln	Lois Burwell and Kay Georgiou
**2013** (67th)	**American Hustle**	**Evelyne Noraz, Lori McCoy-Bell and Kathrine Gordon**
**2013** (67th)	Behind the Candelabra	Kate Biscoe and Marie Larkin
**2013** (67th)	The Butler	Debra Denson, Candace Neal, Robert L. Stevenson and Matthew W. Mungle
**2013** (67th)	The Great Gatsby	Maurizio Silvi and Kerry Warn
**2013** (67th)	The Hobbit: The Desolation of Smaug	Peter Swords King, Richard Taylor and Rick Findlater
**2014** (68th)	**The Grand Budapest Hotel**	**Frances Hannon and Mark Coulier**
**2014** (68th)	Guardians of the Galaxy	Elizabeth Yianni-Georgiou and David White
**2014** (68th)	Into the Woods	Peter Swords King and J. Roy Helland
**2014** (68th)	Mr. Turner	Christine Blundell and Lesa Warrener
**2014** (68th)	The Theory of Everything	Jan Sewell and Kristyan Mallett
**2015** (69th)	**Mad Max: Fury Road**	**Damian Martin and Lesley Vanderwalt**
**2015** (69th)	Brooklyn	Morna Ferguson and Lorraine Glynn
**2015** (69th)	Carol	Jerry DeCarlo, Patricia Regan and Morag Ross
**2015** (69th)	The Danish Girl	Jan Sewell
**2015** (69th)	The Revenant	Siân Grigg, Duncan Jarman and Robert Pandini
**2016** (70th)	**Florence Foster Jenkins**	**J. Roy Helland and Daniel Phillips**
**2016** (70th)	Doctor Strange	Jeremy Woodhead
**2016** (70th)	Hacksaw Ridge	Shane Thomas
**2016** (70th)	Nocturnal Animals	Donald Mowat and Yolanda Toussieng
**2016** (70th)	Rogue One: A Star Wars Story	Amanda Knight, Neal Scanlan and Lisa Tomblin
**2017** (71st)	**Darkest Hour**	**David Malinowski, Ivana Primorac, Lucy Sibbick and Kazuhiro Tsuji**
**2017** (71st)	Blade Runner 2049	Donald Mowat and Kerry Warn
**2017** (71st)	I, Tonya	Deborah La Mia Denaver and Adruitha Lee
**2017** (71st)	Victoria & Abdul	Daniel Phillips and Lou Sheppard
**2017** (71st)	Wonder	Naomi Bakstad, Robert Pandini and Arjen Tuiten
**2018** (72nd)	**The Favourite**	**Nadia Stacey**
**2018** (72nd)	Bohemian Rhapsody	Mark Coulier and Jan Sewell
**2018** (72nd)	Mary Queen of Scots	Jenny Shircore
**2018** (72nd)	Stan & Ollie	Mark Coulier, Jeremy Woodhead and Josh Weston
**2018** (72nd)	Vice	Kate Biscoe, Greg Cannom, Patricia Dehaney and Chris Gallaher
Best Make Up & Hair
**2019** (73rd)	**Bombshell**	**Vivian Baker, Kazu Hiro and Anne Morgan**
**2019** (73rd)	1917	Naomi Donne
**2019** (73rd)	Joker	Kay Georgiou and Nicki Ledermann
**2019** (73rd)	Judy	Jeremy Woodhead
**2019** (73rd)	Rocketman	Lizzie Yianni Georgiou

=== 2020s ===
Year	Film	Recipient(s)
**2020** (74th)	**Ma Rainey's Black Bottom**	**Matiki Anoff, Larry M. Cherry, Sergio López-Rivera and Mia Neal**
**2020** (74th)	The Dig	Jenny Shircore
**2020** (74th)	Hillbilly Elegy	Patricia Dehaney, Eryn Krueger Mekash and Matthew W. Mungle
**2020** (74th)	Mank	Colleen LaBaff, Kimberley Spiteri and Gigi Williams
**2020** (74th)	Pinocchio	Dalia Colli, Mark Coulier and Francesco Pegoretti
**2021** (75th)	**The Eyes of Tammy Faye**	**Linda Dowds, Stephanie Ingram and Justin Raleigh**
**2021** (75th)	Cruella	Naomi Donne and Nadia Stacey
**2021** (75th)	Cyrano	Alessandro Bertolazzi and Siân Miller
**2021** (75th)	Dune	Love Larson and Donald Mowat
**2021** (75th)	House of Gucci	Frederic Aspiras, Jana Carboni, Giuliano Mariano and Sarah Nicole Tanno
**2022** (76th)	**Elvis**	**Jason Baird, Mark Coulier, Louise Coulston and Shane Thomas**
**2022** (76th)	All Quiet on the Western Front	Heike Merker
**2022** (76th)	The Batman	Naomi Donne, Mike Marino and Zoe Tahir
**2022** (76th)	Roald Dahl's Matilda the Musical	Naomi Donne, Barrie Gower and Sharon Martin
**2022** (76th)	The Whale	Annemarie Bradley, Judy Chin and Adrien Morot
**2023** (77th)	**Poor Things**	**Nadia Stacey, Mark Coulier and Josh Weston**
**2023** (77th)	Killers of the Flower Moon	Kay Georgiou and Thomas Nellen
**2023** (77th)	Maestro	Siân Grigg, Kay Georgiou, Kazu Hiro and Lori McCoy-Bell
**2023** (77th)	Napoleon	Jana Carboni, Francesco Pegoretti, Satinder Chumber and Julia Vernon
**2023** (77th)	Oppenheimer	Luisa Abel, Jaime Leigh McIntosh, Jason Hamer and Ahou Mofid
**2024** (78th)	**The Substance**	**Pierre-Olivier Persin, Stéphanie Guillon, Frédérique Arguello and Marilyne Scarselli**
**2024** (78th)	Wicked	Frances Hannon, Laura Blount, Sarah Nuth and Johanna Nielsen
**2024** (78th)	Emilia Pérez	Julia Floch Carbonel, Emmanuel Janvier, Jean-Christophe Spadaccini and Romain Marietti
**2024** (78th)	Nosferatu	David White, Traci Loader and Suzanne Stokes-Munton
**2024** (78th)	Dune: Part Two	Love Larson and Eva Von Bahr
**2025** (79th)	**Frankenstein**	**Jordan Samuel, Cliona Furey, Mike Hill and Megan Many**
**2025** (79th)	Hamnet	Nicole Stafford
**2025** (79th)	Marty Supreme	Kyra Panchenko, Kay Georgiou and Mike Fontaine
**2025** (79th)	Sinners	Siân Richards, Shunika Terry, Ken Diaz, Mike Fontaine
**2025** (79th)	Wicked: For Good	Frances Hannon, Laura Blount, Mark Coulier and Sarah Nuth

== Multiple wins and nominations ==
=== Multiple nominations ===
10 nominations

- Peter Swords King

8 nominations

- Jenny Shircore

7 nominations

- Jan Archibald
- Mark Coulier
- Ve Neill
- Ivana Primorac

6 nominations

- Nick Dudman
- Amanda Knight

5 nominations

- Rick Baker
- Greg Cannom
- Naomi Donne
- Paul Engelen
- Kay Georgiou
- Peter Owen
- Morag Ross
- Richard Taylor
- Kazuhiro Tsuji

4 nominations

- Christine Blundell
- Michèle Burke
- Peter Frampton
- Matthew W. Mungle
- Daniel Phillips
- Peter Robb-King
- Martin Samuel
- Lisa Westcott
- Elizabeth Yianni-Georgiou

3 nominations

- Christine Beveridge
- Kate Biscoe
- Fern Buchner
- Lois Burwell
- John Caglione Jr.
- Judy Chin
- Eithne Fennel
- Siân Grigg
- J. Roy Helland
- Sarah Monzani
- Donald Mowat
- Jean-Luc Russier
- Jan Sewell
- Fabrizio Sforza
- Nadia Stacey
- Lisa Tomblin
- Yolanda Toussieng
- Jeremy Woodhead

2 nominations

- Howard Berger
- Jean Ann Black
- Jana Carboni
- Judi Cooper-Sealy
- Patricia Dehaney
- Anna Dryhurst
- Jean-Pierre Eychenne
- Rick Findlater
- Toni G
- Kevin Haney
- Frances Hannon
- Julie Hewett
- Katherine James
- Sallie Jaye
- Paul LeBlanc
- Nicki Ledermann
- Lori McCoy-Bell
- Robert Pandini
- Francesco Pegoretti
- Jordan Samuel
- Aldo Signoretti
- Maurizio Silvi
- Shane Thomas
- Christopher Tucker
- Kerry Warn
- Josh Weston
- Stan Winston

=== Multiple wins ===
4 wins

- Mark Coulier

3 wins

- Rick Baker
- Kazuhiro Tsuji

2 wins

- Michèle Burke
- J. Roy Helland
- Fabrizio Sforza
- Jenny Shircore
- Nadia Stacey
- Lisa Westcott

== See also ==
- Saturn Award for Best Make-up
- Critics' Choice Movie Award for Best Makeup
- Academy Award for Best Makeup and Hairstyling
- Make-Up Artists and Hair Stylists Guild Award for Best Contemporary Make-Up in a Feature-Length Motion Picture
- Make-Up Artists and Hair Stylists Guild Award for Best Special Make-Up Effects in a Feature-Length Motion Picture
- Make-Up Artists and Hair Stylists Guild Award for Best Contemporary Hair Styling in a Feature-Length Motion Picture
- Make-Up Artists and Hair Stylists Guild Award for Best Period and/or Character Make-Up in a Feature-Length Motion Picture
- Make-Up Artists and Hair Stylists Guild Award for Best Period and/or Character Hair Styling in a Feature-Length Motion Picture
