= Make-Up Artists & Hair Stylists Guild Awards 2022 =

- Date: February 11, 2023
- Site: The Beverly Hilton, California
- Hosted by: Melissa Peterman

The 15th Make-Up Artists and Hair Stylists Guild Awards, presented by Dyson and HASK Beauty, honored outstanding achievements of both make-up and hair stylists in motion pictures, television, commercials and live theater for 2022 on February 11, 2023, at The Beverly Hilton. The nominations were announced on January 11, 2023. The event was hosted by Melissa Peterman.

== Winners and nominees ==
The winners are listed first and in bold.

=== Feature-Length Motion Picture ===
Best Contemporary Make-Up	Best Contemporary Hair Styling
**Everything Everywhere All at Once – Michelle Chung, Erin Rosenmann, Dania A. Ridgway**; The Batman – Naomi Donne, Doone Forsyth, Norma Webb, Jemma Carballo; The Menu – Deborah La Mia Denaver, Mazena Puksto, Donna Cicatelli, Deb Rutherford; Nope – Shutchai Tym Buacharern, Jennifer Zide-Essex, Eleanor Sabaduquia, Kato De Stefan; Spirited – Monica Huppert, Autumn J. Butler, Vivian Baker	**Black Panther: Wakanda Forever – Camille Friend, Evelyn Feliciano, Marva Stokes, Victor Paz**; The Batman – Zoe Tahir, Melissa van Tongeren, Paula Price, Andrea Lance Jones; Everything Everywhere All at Once – Anissa E. Salazar, Meghan Heaney, Miki Caporusso; Glass Onion: A Knives Out Mystery – Jeremy Woodhead, Tracey Smith, Leslie D. Bennett; The Menu – Adruitha Lee, Monique Hyman, Kate Loftis, Barbara Sanders
Best Period and/or Character Make-Up	Best Period Hair Styling and/or Character Hair Styling
**Elvis – Shane Thomas and Angela Conte**; Amsterdam – Nana Fischer, Miho Suzuki, Jason Collins; Babylon – Heba Thorisdottir, Shaunna Bren Chavez, Jean Black, Mandy Artusato; Blonde – Tina Roesler Kerwin, Elena Arroy, Cassie Lyons; Till – Denise Tunnell, Janice Tunnell, Ashley Langston	**Elvis – Shane Thomas and Louise Coulston**; Amsterdam – Adruitha Lee, Lori McCoy-Bell, Cassandra L. Russek, Yvette Shelton; Babylon – Jaime Leigh McIntosh, Ahou Mofid, Aubrey Marie; Blonde – Jaime Leigh McIntosh, Lynnae Duley, Ahou Mofid, Robert Pickens; The Woman King – Louisa Anthony, Jamika Wilson, Plaxedes Kelias, Charity Gwakuka
Best Special Make-Up Effects
**The Whale – Adrien Morot, Kathy Tse, Chris Gallaher**; The Batman – Michael Marino, Mike Fontaine, Yoichi Art Sakamoto, Göran Lundström; Black Panther: Wakanda Forever – Joel Harlow, Kim Felix; Elvis – Mark Coulier, Jason Baird, Barrie Gower, Emma Faulkes, Chloe Muton-Phillips

=== Television Series, Limited, Miniseries, or Movie for Television ===
Best Contemporary Make-Up	Best Contemporary Hair Styling
**Euphoria – Doniella Davy, Tara Lang Shah, Alexandra J. French**; Abbott Elementary – Alisha L. Baijounas, Jenn Bennett, Constance Foe, Emilia Werynska; Emily in Paris – Aurélie Payen, Joséphine Bouchereau, Carole Nicolas, Corinne Maillard; Hacks – Bridget O'Neill; The White Lotus – Rebecca Hickey, Federica Emidi	**Abbott Elementary – Moira Frazier, Dustin Osborne, Christina R. Joseph**; American Horror Stories – Valerie Jackson, Lauren Poole, Suzette Boozer; Black-ish – Nena Ross-Davis, Stacey Morris, Shirlena Allen, Debra Brown; Emily in Paris – Carole Nicolas, Mike Désir, Miharu Oshima, Julien Parizet; Kindred – Jamie Amadio, Chantell Carrtherol
Best Period and/or Character Make-Up	Best Period and/or Character Hair Styling
**Pam & Tommy – David Williams, Jennifer Aspinall, Dave Snyder, Bill Myer**; Bridgerton – Erika Ökvist, Jessie Deol, Sophie Brown, Bethany Long; House of the Dragon – Amanda Knight, Sara Kramer, Heather McCullen; Stranger Things – Amy L. Forsythe, Devin Morales, Lisa Poe, Nataleigh Verrengia; Wednesday – Tara McDonald, Nirvana Jalalvand, Gabriela Cretan	**Our Flag Means Death – Margarita Pidgeon, Stacy Bisel, Kate Loftis, Christopher Enlow**; Bridgerton – Erika Ökvist, Emma Rigby; Dangerous Liaisons – Daniel Parker, Deborah Kenton, Claudia Stolze, Jana Radilová; Hocus Pocus 2 – Cheryl R. Marks, Curtis William Foreman, Mandy Lyons; Pam & Tommy – Barry Lee Moe, Erica Adams, George Guzman, Helena Cepeda
Best Special Make-Up Effects
**Pam & Tommy – David Williams, Jason Collins, Mo Meinhart, Abby Lyle Clawson**; Angelyne – Vincent Van Dyke, Kate Biscoe, Mike Mekash, Abby Lyle Clawson; Gaslit – Kazu Hiro, Richard Redlefsen, Mike Ornela; Guillermo del Toro's Cabinet of Curiosities – Sean Sansom, Mike Hill; Stranger Things – Barrie Gower, Duncan Jarman, Patt Foad, Paula Eden

=== Television Special, One Hour or More Live Program Series ===
Best Contemporary Make-Up	Best Contemporary Hair Styling
**Legendary – Tonia Green, Tyson Fountaine, Silvia Leczel, Sean Conklin**; Beauty and the Beast: A 30th Celebration – Bruce Grayson, James MacKinnon, Melanie Weaver, Angie Wells; Dancing with the Stars – Julie Socash, Donna Bard, Alison L. Gladieux, Farah Bunch; Saturday Night Live – Louie Zakarian, Amy Tagliamonti, Jason Milani, Young Bek; The Voice – Darcy Gilmore, Gina Ghiglieri, Ernesto Casillas, Kristene Bernard	**Legendary – Jerilynn Stephens, Kimi Messina, Dean Francis Banowetz, Lalisa Turner**; Dancing with the Stars – Kimi Messina, Jani Kleinbard, Cheryl Eckert, Gail Ryan; Lizzo's Watch Out for the Big Grrrls – Chantelle Johnson Mosley, Shelby Swain; So You Think You Can Dance – Dean Francis Banowetz, Kimi Messina, LaLisa Turner, Ryan Randall; The Voice – Jerilynn Stephens, Darbie Ann Wieczorek, Suzette Boozer, Robert Lamarr Randle
Best Period and/or Character Make-Up	Best Period Hair Styling and/or Character Hair Styling
**The Guardians of the Galaxy Holiday Special – Michael Ornelaz, Matt Sprunger, Jon Moore, Robin Pritchard**; Beauty and the Beast: A 30th Celebration – Bruce Grayson, James MacKinnon, Tyson Fountaine, Julie Socash; Legendary – Tonia Green, Tyson Fountaine, Jennifer Fregozo, Glen Alen; Saturday Night Live – Louie Zakarian, Amy Tagliamonti, Jason Milani, Daniela Zivcovic; So You Think You Can Dance – Tonia Green, Silvia Leczel, Jennifer Fregozo, Natalie Malchev	**Beauty and the Beast: A 30th Celebration – Anthony Wilson, Jennifer Guerrero, Maria Sandoval, Myo Lai**; Dancing with the Stars – Kimi Messina, Johnny Lomeli, Megg Massey, Jani Kleinbard; The Guardians of the Galaxy Holiday Special – Cassandra L. Russek, Amber S. Hamilton, Sean Smith, Dugg Kirkpatrick; Legendary – Jerilynn Stephens, Kimi Messina, Johnny Lomeli, Suzette Boozer; So You Think You Can Dance – Dean Francis Banowetz, Kimi Messina, Crystal Haynes, Johnny Lomeli
Best Special Make-Up Effects
**The Guardians of the Galaxy Holiday Special – Alexei Dmitriew, Scott Stoddard, LuAndra Whitehurst, Mo Meinhart**; Beauty and the Beast: A 30th Celebration – Bruce Grayson, James MacKinnon, Alexei Dmitriew, Mo Meinhart; Dancing with the Stars – Brian Sipe, Julie Socash, Bianca Marie Appice, David Snyder; Legendary – Tonia Green, Tyson Fountaine, Marcel Banks, Sean Conklin; Saturday Night Live – Louie Zakarian, Jason Milani, Tom Denier Jr., Brandon Grether

=== Daytime Television ===
Best Make-Up	Best Hair Styling
**The Boulet Brothers' Dragula: Titans – Swanthula Boulet, Dracmorda Boulet**; The Bold and the Beautiful – Christine Lai-Johnson, Hajja Barnes, James Elle, Dan Crawley; I Can See Your Voice – Tonia Green, Christina M. Jimenez; The Kelly Clarkson Show – Chanty LaGrana, Valente Frazier, Gloria Elias-Foeillet, Jessica Reyes Paccitti; The Young and the Restless – Patricia Denney, Stacey Alfano, Kelsey Collins, Robert Bolger	**The Kelly Clarkson Show – Tara Copeland, Roberto Ramos**; The Bold and the Beautiful – Stephanie Paugh, Karlye Buff, Alexis Reyes, Danielle Dubinsky; The Talk – Jasmin Robles; The Young and the Restless – Lauren Mendoza, Justin Jackson, Michelle Corona, Guilherme Schoedler

=== Children and Teen Television Programming ===
Best Make-Up	Best Hair Styling
**The Quest – Elle Favorule, Michelle Sfarzo, Sonia Cabrera**; Danger Force – Michael Johnston, Bradley Look, Kevin Westmore, Tyson Fountaine; The Fairly OddParents: Fairly Odder – Michael Johnston, Julie Hassett, Gerardo Avila, Tyson Fountaine; High School Musical: The Musical: The Series – Kimberly Collea, James Cool Benson, Maryann Marchetti; The Really Loud House – Sierra Barton, Alisha Baijounas	**The Quest – Erica Adams, Alyn R. Topper, Lauren McKeever, Jennifer Tremont**; Danger Force – Joe Matke, Roma Goddard, Yunea Cruz, Danyell Lynn Weinberg; The Fairly OddParents: Fairly Odder – Joe Matke, Melanie Verkins, Justin Jackson, Jennifer Green; Raven's Home – Dwayne Ross, Tamara Tripp, Lauren Kinermon; That Girl Lay Lay – Dwayne Ross, Kari Williams, Lauren Kinermon

=== Commercials and Music Videos ===
Best Make-Up	Best Hair Styling
**American Horror Stories: "Dollhouse Promo" – Kerry Herta, Jason Collins, Alyssa Morgan, Christina Kortum**; Amazon: "Medusa Makes Friends" – Dominie Till, Christien Tinsley, Josh Foster, Gunn Espegard; Imagine Dragons: "Bones" (Official Music Video) – Ally McGillicuddy, Malina Stearns, Meg Wilbur, Dave Snyder; Omaze: "Ozzy Osbourne Has a Falling Out with His Pet Demon" – Richard Redlefsen, Chelsea Delfino; Ozzy Osbourne: "Patient No. 9" (Official Music Video) ft. Jeff Beck – Richard Redlefsen, Chelsea Delfino	**American Horror Stories: "Season 2 Promo" – Joe Matke, Tiphanie Baum, Jerilynn Stephens, Johnny Lomeli**; Amazon: "Holidays: Romeo and Juliet" – Dominie Till, Gunn Espegard, Dawn V. Dudley, Renee Vaca; GEICO: "Life in a Victorian Home" – Audrey Futterman-Stern, Tom Opitz, Jackie Weiss, Kerry Mendenhall; Lil Nas X – Vitamin Water: "Nourish Every You" – Stacey Morris, Dominique Evans, Taurus Jerome; Taylor Swift: "Bejeweled" – Cheryl R. Marks, Allyson Joyner, Jemma Muradian

=== Theatrical Productions (Live Stage) ===
Best Make-Up	Best Hair Styling
**Kinky Boots – Brandi Strona, Glen Alen, Lilia Villasenor**; Harry Potter and the Cursed Child – Jason Michael Torres, Timothy Santry, Jenni Gilbert, Yulitzin Alvarez; Lucia di Lammermoor – Samantha Wiener, Brandi Strona; Sleeping Beauty – Lindsay Saier, Lyre Alston; Tosca – Samantha Wiener, Brandi Strona, Danielle E. Richter	**La traviata – Jeanna Parham, Christina E. Martin**; Kinky Boots – Brandi Strona, Jacki Nocerino, Mary Czech; Omar – Samantha Wiener, Danielle E. Richter, Jacki Nocerino; Sense and Sensibility – Lindsay Saier, Leilani Norman

=== Honorary Awards ===
- Distinguished Artisan Award – Angela Bassett
- Vanguard Award – Fred C. Blau Jr. and Judy Crown
- Lifetime Achievement Award – Steve La Porte and Josée Normand
