= Make-Up Artists & Hair Stylists Guild Awards 2023 =

- Date: February 18, 2024
- Site: The Beverly Hilton, California
- Hosted by: Melissa Peterman
- Most wins: Dancing with the Stars (3)
- Most nominations: Dancing with the Stars (5)

The 16th Make-Up Artists & Hair Stylists Guild Awards, presented by Dyson and HASK Beauty, honored outstanding achievements for both make-up and hair stylists in motion pictures, television, commercials and live theater for 2023 on February 18, 2024, at The Beverly Hilton. The nominations were announced on January 2, 2024. The event was hosted by Melissa Peterman for the third consecutive year.

== Winners and nominees ==
The winners are listed first and in bold.

=== Feature-Length Motion Picture ===
Best Contemporary Make-Up	Best Contemporary Hair Styling
**Saltburn – Siân Miller, Laura Allen**; Candy Cane Lane – Tym Shutchai Buacharern, Michele Lewis, Jennifer Zide-Essex, Yvettra Grantham; Guardians of the Galaxy Vol. 3 – Jane Galli; Haunted Mansion – Kimberly Jones, Dionne Wynn, Bridgit Crider, Carla Vannessa Wallace; Nyad – Felicity Bowring, Ann Maree Hurley, Julie Hewett, Maha Mimo	**Saltburn – Siân Miller, Laura Allen**; Candy Cane Lane – Yvette Shelton, Shian Banks, Stacey Morris, Maisha Oliver; Joy Ride – Jeannie Chow, Kim Lee; Nyad – Daniel Curet, Vanessa Columbo, Enzo Angileri, Darlene Brumfeld; Pain Hustlers – Michelle Johnson, Dennis Bailey
Best Period and/or Character Make-Up	Best Period Hair Styling and/or Character Hair Styling
**Maestro – Siân Grigg, Jackie Risotto, Elisa Tallerico, Nicky Pattison-Illum**; Barbie – Ivana Primorac, Victoria Down, Maha Mimo; Guardians of the Galaxy Vol. 3 – Alexei Dmitriew, Nicole Sortillon, Amos Samantha Ward, LuAndra Whitehurst; Oppenheimer – Luisa Abel, Jason Hamer, Kerrin Jackson, Jamie Loree Hess; Poor Things – Nadia Stacey	**Barbie – Ivana Primorac, Marie Larkin, Clare Corsick**; Chevalier – Roo Maurice, Francesco Pegoretti; The Color Purple – Lawrence Davis, Andrea Mona Bowman, Tym Wallace; Guardians of the Galaxy Vol. 3 – Cassandra Lyn Russek, Stephanie Fenner, Peter Tothpal, Connie Criswell; Maestro – Kay Georgiou, Lori McCoy-Bell, Jameson Eaton, Amanda Duffy-Evans
Best Special Make-Up Effects
**Maestro – Kazu Hiro, Siân Grigg, Duncan Jarman, Mike Mekash**; Golda – Karen Thomas, Eva Susanna Johnson Theodosiou; Guardians of the Galaxy Vol. 3 – Alexei Dmitriew, Lindsay MacGowen, Shane Mahan, Scott Stoddard; Poor Things – Nadia Stacey, Mark Coulier; Rebel Moon: Part One – A Child of Fire – Ozzy Alvarez, Justin Raleigh, Kelsey Berk, Jonathan Shroyer

=== Television Series – Limited, Miniseries, or Movie for Television ===
Best Contemporary Make-Up	Best Contemporary Hair Styling
**The Idol – Kirsten Sage Coleman, Mandy Artusato, Jessie Bishop, Erin Blinn (HBO)**; Abbott Elementary – Alisha L. Baijounas, Emilia Werynska, Jenn Bennett, Constance Foe (ABC); The Bear – Ignacia Soto-Aguilar, Nicole Rogers (FX); The Last of Us – Connie Parker, Joanna Mireau, Joanne Preece, Danielle Hanson (HBO); Poker Face – Amy L. Forsythe, Heidi Pakdel-Payan, Rebecca Levine, Shannon Dollison (Peacock)	**The Morning Show – Nicole Venables, Jennifer Petrovich, Janine Thompson, Lona Vigi (Apple TV+)**; The Bear – Ally Vickers, Angela Brasington, Melanie Shaw (FX); The Idol – Christopher Fulton, Gloria Conrad, Kamaura Eley, Kya Bilal (HBO); Ted Lasso – Nicky Austin (Apple TV+); You People – Tinisha Boyd, Alyson Black-Barrie, Lisa Buford, Tracey Macky (Netflix)
Best Period and/or Character Make-Up	Best Period and/or Character Hair Styling
**The Crown – Cate Hall, Emilie Yong-Mills, Debbie Ormrod, Stacey Holman (Netflix)**; Ahsoka – Alexei Dmitriew, Cristina Waltz, Alex Perrone, Cale Thomas (Disney+); Daisy Jones & the Six – Rebecca Wachtel, RJ McCasland, Sherri Simmons, Michele Tyminski Schoenbach (Prime Video); Lessons in Chemistry – Miho Suzuki, Martina Kohl (Apple TV+); The Marvelous Mrs. Maisel – Patricia Regan, Joseph A. Campayno, Claus Lulla, Michael Laudati (Prime Video)	**Queen Charlotte: A Bridgerton Story – Nic Collins, Giorgio Galliero (Netflix)**; The Crown – Cate Hall, Emilie Yong- Mills, Francesca Hissey, Oonagh Bagley (Netflix); The Gilded Age – Sean Flanigan, Christine Fennell-Harlan, Jonathan Sharpless, Aaron Kinchen (HBO); Lessons in Chemistry – Teressa Hill, Carol Mitchell, Juan Nunez, Sharisse Fine (Apple TV+); The Marvelous Mrs. Maisel – Kimberley Spiteri, KeLeen Snowgren (Prime Video)
Best Special Make-Up Effects
**The Last of Us – Barrie Gower, Paul Spateri, Sarah Gower, Paula Eden (HBO)**; Ahsoka – Alexei Dmitriew, Cristina Waltz, Ana Gabriela Quinonez, Ian Goodwin (Disney+); The Fall of the House of Usher – Ozzy Alvarez, Justin Raleigh, Kelsey Berk, Harlow MacFarlane (Netflix); The Marvelous Mrs. Maisel – Mike Marino, Richard Redlefsen, Kevin Kirkpatrick (Prime Video); Star Trek: Picard – James MacKinnon, Hugo Villasenor, Bianca Appice, Vincent VanDyke (Paramount+); The Witcher – Mark Coulier, Deb Watson, Stephen Murphy, Josh Weston (Netflix)

=== Television Special, One Hour or More Live Program Series ===
Best Contemporary Make-Up	Best Contemporary Hair Styling
**Dancing with the Stars – Julie Socash, Donna Bard, Lois Harriman, Sarah Woolf (ABC / Disney+)**; American Idol – Tonia Green, Gina Ghiglieri, Natalie Malchev, Michael Anthony (ABC); Nickelodeon Kids' Choice Awards 2023 – Thad Nalitz, Alison Gladieux, Christina Jimenez, Kathy Santiago (Nickelodeon); Saturday Night Live – Louie Zakarian, Amy Tagliamonti, Jason Milani, Young Bek (NBC); The Voice – Darcy Gilmore, Gina Ghiglieri, Kristene Bernard, Marylin Lee Spiege (NBC)	**Dancing with the Stars – Dwayne Ross, Joe Matke, Amber Nicholle Maher, Marion Rogers (ABC / Disney+)**; 65th Annual Grammy Awards – Brian Steven Banks (CBS); American Idol – Dean Banowetz, Amber Maher, Kimi Messina, Lalisa Turner (ABC); The Voice – Jerilynn Stephens, Darbie Wieczorek, Lalisa Turner, Suzette Boozer (NBC); Nickelodeon Kids' Choice Awards 2023 – Jerilynn Stephens, Kimi Messina, Joe Matke, Suzette Boozer (Nickelodeon)
Best Period and/or Character Make-Up	Best Period Hair Styling and/or Character Hair Styling
**Saturday Night Live – Louie Zakarian, Amy Tagliamonti, Jason Milani, Joanna Pisani (NBC)**; The Boulet Brothers' Dragula: "Halfway to Halloween" – Swanthula Boulet, Dracmorda Boulet (AMC); Dancing with the Stars – Julie Socash, Brian Sipe, James MacKinnon, Tyson Fountaine (ABC / Disney+)	**Dancing with the Stars – Kimi Messina, Dwayne Ross, Joe Matke, Brittany Spaulding (ABC / Disney+)**; 95th Academy Awards – Anthony Wilson, Jennifer Guerrero, Myo Lai, Florence Witherspoon (ABC); Hannah Waddingham: Home for Christmas – Debbie Dannell, Lewis Pallett, Lisa Houghton (Apple TV+)
Best Special Make-Up Effects
**Saturday Night Live – Louie Zakarian, Jason Milani, Bradon Grether, Tom Denier Jr. (NBC)**; Dancing with the Stars – Brian Sipe, James MacKinnon, Cary Ayers, Julie Socash (ABC / Disney+)

=== Daytime Television ===
Best Make-Up	Best Hair Styling
**The Boulet Brothers' Dragula – Swanthula Boulet, Dracmorda Boulet (AMC)**; The Big Nailed It Baking Challenge – Moira Frazier, Denise Baker, Ryan Randall, LaLisa Turner (Netflix); The Bold and the Beautiful – Christine Lai-Johnson, Hajja Barnes, Briana Garcia, Daniela Delgado (CBS); The Kelly Clarkson Show – Chanty LaGrana, Gloria Elias-Foeillet, Valente Frazier, Monica Boyd Lester (Syndicated); The Young and the Restless – Stacey Browning, Jamie Kelch, Robert Bolger, Riley Nightingall (CBS)	**The Young and the Restless – Lauren Mendoza, Justin Jackson, Michelle Corona, Diana Santana (CBS)**; The Big Nailed It Baking Challenge – Moira Frazier, Denise Baker, Ryan Randall, LaLisa Turner (Netflix); The Bold and the Beautiful – Stephanie Paugh, Alexis Reyes, Danielle Dubinsky, Karlye Buff (CBS); The Kelly Clarkson Show – Roberto Ramos Corey Morris Tara Copeland, Adam Long (Syndicated); Snake Oil – Crystal Broedel, Karen Stein (Fox)

=== Children and Teen Television Programming ===
Best Make-Up	Best Hair Styling
**American Born Chinese – Jorjee Linda Douglass, Mara Rouse, Nicole Hawkyard, Ralis Kahn (Disney+)**; Danger Force – Michael Johnston, Brad Look, Kevin Westmore, Orlando Marin (Nickelodeon); Goosebumps – Zabrina Wanjiru Matiru, Werner Pretorius, Krista Hann, Felix Fox (Disney+ / Hulu); Monster High 2 – Leah Ehman, Gila Bois, Kiara Desjarlais, Lindsay Pilkey (Paramount+); The Santa Clauses – Erica Preus, Howard Berger, Scott Stoddard, Eryn Krueger Mekash (Disney+)	**The Santa Clauses – Anissa Emily Salazar, Nina Adado, Morgan Ferrando, Patricia Lansingh (Disney+)**; Danger Force – Joe Matke, Danyell Weinberg Alexis Stafford (Nickelodeon); Monster High 2 – Debra Frances Wiebe, Tammy Lim, Julie McHaffie, Sharon Markell (Paramount+); One Piece – Amanda Ross-McDonald, Vera Alimanova, Odette Rebok, Ermine Kirstein-Venter (Netflix); Saturdays – Ruhamah Taylor, Brittany Powell, Kelvin Ingram Jr., Nadling Fletcher (Disney Channel)

=== Commercials and Music Videos ===
Best Make-Up	Best Hair Styling
**American Horror Story: Delicate – Kerry Ann Herta, Jason Collins, Alyssa Morgan, Orlando Marin**; Capital One Quicksilver: "Holiday Night Fever with John Travolta as Santa" – Michael Ornelaz, Scott Stoddard, Alexei Dmitriew, Connie Criswell; Doja Cat: "Demons" – Olha Tarnovetska, Catherine Paschen, Nicolas D. Gonzalez, Patrick Bradberry; GEICO: "The Ease Specialist: Wormhole Edition" – Jennifer Aspinall, Leonard MacDonald, Allasigga Jonsdotti; General Motors & Netflix: "Will Ferrell Super Bowl Ad" – Justin Raleigh, Tony Alvarez, Kelsey Berk, Jamie Kelman	**American Horror Story: Delicate – Joe Matke, Jeri Baker, Johnny Lomeli**; Halle Bailey: "Angel" – Tinisha Boyd Nena Davis; General Motors & Netflix: "Will Ferrell Super Bowl Ad" – Cheryl Marks, Allyson Joyner, Vanessa Price; HelloFresh | Guardians of the Galaxy Vol. 3: "From the Cubicle to the Cosmos" – Ashleigh Childers; Scott for Scotts Ad – Tiphanie Baum

=== Theatrical Productions (Live Stage) ===
Best Make-Up	Best Hair Styling
**Dr. Seuss' How the Grinch Stole Christmas! The Musical – Robyn-Marie Rebbe, Chloe Nil Acerol, Ashley Roller, Angelina Avallone**; Die Frau ohne Schatten Opera by Richard Strauss – Jeanna Parham, Melanie Birch, Denise Gutierrez, Lisa Patnoe; Don Giovanni – Samantha Wiener, Brandi Strona, Nicole Rodrigues, Nathalie Eidt; El último sueño de Frida y Diego – Samantha Wiener, Brandi Strona, Nicole Rodrigues, Kelso Millett; MADCAP by San Francisco Ballet – Maurisa Rondeau, Gerd Mairandres, Jordan Plath, Toby Mayer	**Dr. Seuss' How the Grinch Stole Christmas! The Musical – Robyn-Marie Rebbe, Chloe Nil Acerol, Elizabeth Printz, Thomas Augustine**; The Barber of Seville – Y. Sharon Peng; Bolero by San Francisco Ballet – Thomas Richards-Keyes, Ksenia Antonoff, Melissa Kallstrom, Robert Mrazik; Jane Austen Unscripted: Tea at Pemberley – Laura Caponera; The Marriage of Figaro – Samantha Wiener, Danielle Richter, Jacki Noccerino, Morgan Sellars

=== Honorary Awards ===
- Vanguard Award – Michael Westmore
- Distinguished Artisan Award – Annette Bening
- Lifetime Achievement Award – Kevin Haney and Ora T. Green
