= Make-Up Artists & Hair Stylists Guild Award for Best Period and/or Character Hair Styling in a Feature-Length Motion Picture =

Make-Up Artists and Hair Stylists Guild Award for Best Period and/or Character Make-Up in a Feature-Length Motion Picture
- Country: United States
- Presented by: Make-Up Artists and Hair Stylists Guild (MUAHS)
- First award: 2014
- Currently held by: Lindy Dunn, Teressa Hill, Yvonne De Patis-Kupka, Kim Santantonio; Being the Ricardos (2021)
- Website: Make-Up Artists & Hair Stylists Guild

The Make-Up Artists and Hair Stylists Guild Award for Best Period and/or Character Hair Styling in a Feature-Length Motion Picture is one of the awards given annually to people working in the motion picture industry by the Make-Up Artists and Hair Stylists Guild (MUAHS). It is presented to the hair stylists whose work has been deemed "best" in a given year, within a period-set film, and/or for specific character hair styling. The award was first given in 2014, during the sixth annual awards. For the first five ceremonies, the period and character aspects of the category were separated, and awarded individually.

== Winners and nominees ==
=== 1990s ===
Best Period Hair Styling- Feature

Year	Film	Nominees
(1999); 1st
(1999); 1st	Tea with Mussolini	Vivian McAteer
(1999); 1st	The 13th Warrior	Peter Tothpal, Janet MacDonald, Angelina P. Cameron
(1999); 1st	Austin Powers: The Spy Who Shagged Me	Candy L. Walken, Jeri Baker, Jennifer Bower O'Halloran, Toni-Ann Walker

=== 2000s ===
Best Character Hair Styling - Feature

Year	Film	Nominees
(2001); 3rd
(2001); 3rd	A.I. Artificial Intelligence	Candace Neal, Karen Asano-Myers, Terry Baliel
(2001); 3rd	Bandits	Marlene Williams
(2001); 3rd	Planet of the Apes	Patty Miller, Terry Baliel, Randy Sayer
(2002); 4th
(2002); 4th	The Lord of the Rings: The Two Towers (Arwen)	Peter King, Peter Owen
(2002); 4th	Austin Powers in Goldmember (Austin Powers, Dr. Evil, Fat Bastard, Goldmember)	Candy L. Walken, Jeri Baker, Susan V. Kalinowski
(2002); 4th	Frida (Frida Kahlo)	Beatrice De Alba
(2003); 5th
(2003); 5th	Pirates of the Caribbean: The Curse of the Black Pearl	Martin Samuel, Lucia Mace
(2003); 5th	The Cat in the Hat	Voni Hinkle, Shari Perry, Karl Wesson
(2003); 5th	The Lord of the Rings: The Return of the King	Peter King, Peter Owen

Best Period Hair Styling - Feature

Year	Film	Nominees
(2000); 2nd
(2000); 2nd	The Patriot	Kay Georgiou, Kelvin R. Trahan, Geraldine Jones
(2000); 2nd	Almost Famous	
(2000); 2nd	Thirteen Days	
(2001); 3rd
(2001); 3rd	Moulin Rouge!	Aldo Signoretti, Ferdinando Merolla, Giorgio Gregorini
(2001); 3rd	Ali	Pierce Austin (personal)
(2001); 3rd	Blow	Martin Samuel, Rita Troy, Karl Wesson
(2002); 4th
(2002); 4th	Gangs of New York	Aldo Signoretti
(2002); 4th	Austin Powers in Goldmember	Candy L. Walken, Jeri Baker, Susan V. Kalinowski
(2002); 4th	Frida	Beatrice De Alba
(2003); 5th
(2003); 5th	The Last Samurai	Janice Alexander, Terry Baliel, Karen Asano-Myers, Carol Pershing, Kimberley Spiteri
(2003); 5th	Master and Commander: The Far Side of the World	Yolanda Toussieng, Kim Santantonio, Barbara Lorenz
(2003); 5th	Pirates of the Caribbean: The Curse of the Black Pearl	Martin Samuel, Lucia Mace, Nina Paskowitz

=== 2010s ===
Best Period and/or Character Makeup - Feature Films

Year	Film	Nominees
(2013); 6th
(2013); 6th	American Hustle	Kathrine Gordon, Michelle Johnson
(2013); 6th	Jobs	Nina Paskowitz, Michael Moore
(2013); 6th	The Lone Ranger	Gloria Pasqua-Casny, Jules Holdren
(2014); 7th
(2014); 7th	The Grand Budapest Hotel	Frances Hannon, Julie Dartnell
(2014); 7th	Get on Up	Carla Farmer, Shannon Bakeman
(2014); 7th	Into the Woods	Peter King, J. Roy Helland
(2014); 7th	Selma	Melissa Forney, Pierce Austin
(2014); 7th	The Theory of Everything	Jan Sewell, Agnes Legere

Best Period and/or Character Make-Up in a Feature-Length Motion Picture

Year	Film	Nominees
(2015); 8th
(2015); 8th	Cinderella	Carol Hemming, Orla Carrol, Wakana Yoshihara
(2015); 8th	Brooklyn	Lorraine Glynn, Lorraine Brennan, Michelle Côté
(2015); 8th	Carol	Jerry DeCarlo, John Jack Curtin, Kay Georgiou
(2015); 8th	The Danish Girl	Jan Sewell, Renata Gilbert
(2015); 8th	Mad Max: Fury Road	Anita Morgan, Kerstin Weller, Kylie Clarke
(2016); 9th
(2016); 9th	Hail, Caesar!	Cydney Cornell, Pauletta O. Lewis, Matt Danon
(2016); 9th	Fantastic Beasts and Where to Find Them	Fae Hammond, Marilyn MacDonald
(2016); 9th	Florence Foster Jenkins	J. Roy Helland
(2016); 9th	Jackie	Catherine Leblanc, Tony Rocchetti
(2016); 9th	Loving	Kenneth Walker, Elizabeth Paschall
(2017); 10th
(2017); 10th	I, Tonya	Adruitha Lee, Mary Everett
(2017); 10th	Atomic Blonde	Donald Mowat, Jo-Ann MacNeil, Csilla Blake-Horváth
(2017); 10th	Beauty and the Beast	Jenny Shircore, Marc Pilcher, Charlotte Hayward
(2017); 10th	Blade Runner 2049	Kerry Warn, Lizzie Lawson, Jaime Leigh McIntosh
(2017); 10th	Darkest Hour	Ivana Primorac, Flora Moody
(2018); 11th
(2018); 11th	Mary Queen of Scots	Jenny Shircore, Marc Pilcher
(2018); 11th	BlacKkKlansman	LaWanda M. Pierre, Shaun Perkins
(2018); 11th	Black Panther	Camille Friend, Jaime Leigh McIntosh, Louisa V. Anthony
(2018); 11th	Bohemian Rhapsody	Jan Sewell, Mark Coulier
(2018); 11th	Mary Poppins Returns	Peter King, Paula Price
(2019); 12th
(2019); 12th	Downton Abbey	Anne Oldham, Elaine Browne, Marc Pilcher
(2019); 12th	Dolemite Is My Name	Carla Farmer, Stacey Morris, Linda Villalobos
(2019); 12th	Maleficent: Mistress of Evil	Audrey Futterman-Stern
(2019); 12th	Once Upon a Time ... in Hollywood	Janine Rath, Michelle Diamantides
(2019); 12th	Rocketman	Elizabeth Yianni-Georgiou, Tapio Salmi, Laura Solari

=== 2020s ===
Year	Film	Nominees
(2020); 13th
(2020); 13th	Ma Rainey's Black Bottom	Mia Neal, Larry Cherry, Leah Loukas, Tywan Williams
(2020); 13th	Hillbilly Elegy	Patricia Dehaney, Tony Ward, Martial Corneville, Stacey Butterworth
(2020); 13th	Jingle Jangle: A Christmas Journey	Sharon Martin, Kat Fa
(2020); 13th	Mank	Kimberley Spiteri, Colleen LaBaff
(2020); 13th	Mulan	Denise Kum, Rick Findlater, Georgia Lockhart-Adams, Terry Baliel
(2021); 14th
(2021); 14th	Being the Ricardos	Lindy Dunn, Teressa Hill, Yvonne De Patis-Kupka, Kim Santantonio
(2021); 14th	Cruella	Naomi Donne, Nadia Stacey, Julia Vernon
(2021); 14th	The Eyes of Tammy Faye	Bryson Conley, Heather Hawkins, Stephanie Ingram, Betty Lou Skinner
(2021); 14th	House of Gucci	Frederic Aspiras, Alexis Continente, Anna Carin Lock, Giuliano Mariano
(2021); 14th	West Side Story	Jerry DeCarlo, Kay Georgiou
(2022); 15th	Elvis	Shane Thomas, Louise Coulston
(2022); 15th	Amsterdam	Adruitha Lee, Lori McCoy-Bell, Cassandra L. Russek, Yvette Shelton
(2022); 15th	Babylon	Jaime Leigh McIntosh, Ahou Mofid, Aubrey Marie
(2022); 15th	Blonde	Jaime Leigh McIntosh, Lynnae Duley, Ahou Mofid, Robert Pickens
(2022); 15th	The Woman King	Louisa Anthony, Jamika Wilson, Plaxedes Kelias, Charity Gwakuka
(2023); 16th
(2023); 16th	Barbie	Ivana Primorac, Marie Larkin, Clare Corsick
(2023); 16th	Chevalier	Roo Maurice, Francesco Pegoretti
(2023); 16th	The Color Purple	Lawrence Davis, Andrea Mona Bowman, Tym Wallace
(2023); 16th	Guardians of the Galaxy Vol. 3	Cassandra Lyn Russek, Stephanie Fenner, Peter Tothpal, Connie Criswell
(2023); 16th	Maestro	Kay Georgiou, Lori McCoy-Bell, Jameson Eaton, Amanda Duffy-Evans
