= Make-Up Artists & Hair Stylists Guild Award for Best Contemporary Hair Styling in a Feature-Length Motion Picture =

Make-Up Artists and Hair Stylists Guild Award for Best Contemporary Hair Styling in a Feature-Length Motion Picture
- Country: United States
- Presented by: Make-Up Artists and Hair Stylists Guild (MUAHS)
- First award: 1999
- Currently held by: Louisa Anthony, Carla Farmer, Stacey Morris, Victor Paz; Coming 2 America (2021)
- Website: Make-Up Artists & Hair Stylists Guild

The Make-Up Artists and Hair Stylists Guild Award for Best Contemporary Hair Styling in a Feature-Length Motion Picture is one of the awards given annually to people working in the motion picture industry by the Make-Up Artists & Hair Stylists Guild (MUAHS). It is presented to the hair stylists whose work has been deemed "best" in a given year, within a contemporary-set film. The award was first given in 2000, during the first annual awards, and was given when the awards were brought back in 2014.

== Winners and nominees ==
=== 1990s ===
Year	Film	Nominees
(1999); 1st
(1999); 1st	The Thomas Crown Affair	Enzo Angileri
(1999); 1st	American Beauty	Cydney Cornell
(1999); 1st	Anywhere But Here	Paul LeBlanc
(1999); 1st	Simpatico	Frances Mathias

=== 2000s ===
Year	Film	Nominees
(2000); 2nd
(2000); 2nd	Charlie's Angels	Barbara Olvera, Anne Morgan, Barbara Lorenz, Lori McCoy-Bell
(2000); 2nd	Bedazzled	
(2000); 2nd	Erin Brockovich	
(2001); 3rd
(2001); 3rd	Legally Blonde	Joy Zapata, Linda Arnold
(2001); 3rd	Amélie	John Nollet, Veronique Boitout
(2001); 3rd	Mulholland Drive	Patty Miller, Katherine Rees, Emjay Olson
(2002); 4th
(2002); 4th	Sorority Boys	Donna Barrett Gilbert, Joanne Harris
(2002); 4th	Die Another Day	Colin Jamison
(2002); 4th	Sweet Home Alabama	Anne Morgan
(2003); 5th
(2003); 5th	Legally Blonde 2: Red, White & Blonde	Toni-Ann Walker, Stephen Robinette, Edward Morrison
(2003); 5th	The Italian Job	Enzo Angileri
(2003); 5th	Terminator 3: Rise of the Machines	Peter Tothpal, Cydney Cornell
(2003); 5th	Under the Tuscan Sun	Candy L. Walken

=== 2010s ===
Year	Film	Nominees
(2013); 6th
(2013); 6th	Lee Daniels' The Butler	Candace Neal, Robert L. Stevenson
(2013); 6th	One Chance	Christine Blundell, Donald McInnes
(2013); 6th	Unfinished Song	Lucy Cain
(2014); 7th
(2014); 7th	Birdman or (The Unexpected Virtue of Ignorance)	Jerry Popolis, Kat Drazen
(2014); 7th	Guardians of the Galaxy	Elizabeth Yianni-Georgiou
(2014); 7th	Interstellar	Patricia DeHaney, Jose Zamora
(2014); 7th	St. Vincent	Suzy Mazzarese-Allison
(2014); 7th	Winter's Tale	Alan D'Angerio, Jasen Joseph Sica
(2015); 8th
(2015); 8th	Pitch Perfect 2	Cheryl Marks, Meagan Herrera, Daina Daigle
(2015); 8th	Ex Machina	Siân Grigg, Charlotte Rogers
(2015); 8th	Furious 7	Linda D. Flowers, Jennifer Santiago, Lisa Ann Wilson
(2015); 8th	Spectre	Zoe Tahir
(2015); 8th	Spy	Sarah Love, Linda D. Flowers
(2016); 9th
(2016); 9th	La La Land	Barbara Lorenz, Jacklin Masteran, Frida Aradottir
(2016); 9th	The Girl on the Train	Alan D'Angerio
(2016); 9th	Nocturnal Animals	Yolanda Toussieng, Jules Holdren
(2016); 9th	Sully	Patricia DeHaney, Jose Zamora
(2016); 9th	Zoolander 2	Aldo Signoretti
(2017); 10th
(2017); 10th	Guardians of the Galaxy Vol. 2	Camille Friend, Louisa V. Anthony, Jules Holdren
(2017); 10th	The Big Sick	Tonia Ciccone, Toni Roman
(2017); 10th	Pitch Perfect 3	Cheryl Marks, Melissa Malkasian, Andrea Bowman
(2017); 10th	Three Billboards Outside Ebbing, Missouri	Cydney Cornell, Susan Buffington
(2017); 10th	Wonder	Robert Pandini, Ailsa Macmillan
(2018); 10th
(2018); 10th	Crazy Rich Asians	Heike Merker, Sophia Knight
(2018); 10th	Nappily Ever After	Dawn Turner, Larry Simms
(2018); 10th	A Star Is Born	Lori McCoy-Bell, Joy Zapata, Frederic Aspires
(2018); 10th	Vox Lux	Esther Ahn, Daniel Koye
(2018); 10th	Widows	Linda Flowers, Daniel Curet, Denise Wynbrandt
(2019); 12th
(2019); 12th	Bombshell	Anne Morgan, Jaime Leigh McIntosh, Adruitha Lee
(2019); 12th	Hustlers	Angel De Angelis, Dierdre Harris
(2019); 12th	John Wick: Chapter 3 – Parabellum	Kerrie Smith, Therese Ducey
(2019); 12th	Joker	Kay Georgiou, Vanessa Anderson
(2019); 12th	The Laundromat	Marie Larkin, Yvette Stone, J. Roy Helland

=== 2020s ===
Year	Film	Nominees
(2020); 13th
(2020); 13th	Birds of Prey (and the Fantabulous Emancipation of One Harley Quinn)	Adruitha Lee, Cassie Russek, Margarita Pidgeon, Nikki Nelms
(2020); 13th	Bill & Ted Face the Music	Donna Spahn-Jones, Budd Bird, Jeri Baker, Ulla Gaudin
(2020); 13th	Borat Subsequent Moviefilm	Kimberly Boyenger, Tyler Ely
(2020); 13th	The Prom	Chris Clark, Natalie Driscoll, Ka’Maura Eley, J. Roy Helland
(2020); 13th	Promising Young Woman	Daniel Curet, Bryson Conley, Lee Ann Brittenham
(2021); 14th
(2021); 14th	Coming 2 America	Louisa Anthony, Carla Farmer, Stacey Morris, Victor Paz
(2021); 14th	In the Heights	Annemarie Bradley-Sherron, Diedre Harris, Betsy Reyes, Valerie Velez
(2021); 14th	The Matrix Resurrections	Flora Moody, Kerrie Smith, Shunika Terry
(2021); 14th	No Time to Die	Daniel Phillips
(2021); 14th	The Suicide Squad	Michelle Diamantides, Janine Rath-Thompson, Kristen Saia, Melizah Wheat
(2022); 15th	Black Panther: Wakanda Forever	Camille Friend, Evelyn Feliciano, Marva Stokes, Victor Paz
(2022); 15th	The Batman	Zoe Tahir, Melissa Van Tongeran, Paula Price, Andrea Lance Jones
(2022); 15th	Everything Everywhere All at Once	Anissa E. Salazar, Meghan Heaney, Miki Caporusso
(2022); 15th	Glass Onion: A Knives Out Mystery	Jeremy Woodhead, Tracey Smith, Leslie D. Bennett
(2022); 15th	The Menu	Adruitha Lee, Monique Hyman, Kate Loftis, Barbara Sanders
(2023); 16th
(2023); 16th	Saltburn	Siân Miller, Laura Miller
(2023); 16th	Candy Cane Lane	Yvette Shelton, Shian Banks, Stacey Morris, Maisha Oliver
(2023); 16th	Joy Ride	Jeannie Chow, Kim Lee
(2023); 16th	Nyad	Daniel Curet, Vanessa Columbo, Enzo Angileri, Darlene Brumfeld
(2023); 16th	Pain Hustlers	Michelle Johnson, Dennis Bailey
