= British Independent Film Award for Best Make-Up & Hair Design =

- Awarded for: Best Make-Up and Hair Design
- Country: United Kingdom
- Presented by: BIFA
- First award: 2017
- Currently held by: Unicorns – Lisa Mustafa (2024)
- Website: www.bifa.org.uk

The British Independent Film Award for Best Make-Up & Hair Design is an annual award given by the British Independent Film Awards (BIFA) to recognize the best make-up and hair design in a British independent film. The award was first presented in the 2017 ceremony.

Prior to 2017, make-up was included in the category Best Technical Achievement alongside different areas of crafts in film, this category was presented from 2001 to 2016.

== Winners and nominees ==
=== 2010s ===
Year	Film	Recipient(s)
2017 (20th)	The Death of Stalin	Nicole Stafford
2017 (20th)	Breathe	Jan Sewellm and Mark Coulier
2017 (20th)	I Am Not a Witch	Julene Paton
2017 (20th)	Journeyman	Nadia Stacey
2017 (20th)	Lady Macbeth	Sian Wilson
2018 (21st)	The Favourite	Nadia Stacey
2018 (21st)	Colette	Ivana Primorac
2018 (21st)	Peterloo	Christine Blundell
2018 (21st)	A Prayer Before Dawn	Stacey Louise Holman
2018 (21st)	Stan & Ollie	Mark Coulier and Jeremy Woodhead
2019 (22nd)	Judy	Jeremy Woodhead
2019 (22nd)	Dirty God	Morten Jacobsen, Rogier Samuels and Lindelotte Van Der Meer
2019 (22nd)	In Fabric	Emma Scott
2019 (22nd)	The Personal History of David Copperfield	Karen Hartley-Thomas
2019 (22nd)	Wild Rose	Jody Williams

=== 2020s ===
Year	Film	Recipient(s)
2020 (23rd)	Misbehaviour	Jill Sweeney
2020 (23rd)	Ammonite	Ivana Primorac
2020 (23rd)	His House	Sharon A. Martin
2020 (23rd)	Rocks	Nora Robertson
2020 (23rd)	Saint Maud	Jacquetta Levon
2021 (24th)	The Electrical Life of Louis Wain	Vickie Lang, Kristyan Mallett and Donald McInnes
2021 (24th)	Belfast	Wakana Yoshihara
2021 (24th)	Censor	Ruth Pease
2021 (24th)	Everybody's Talking About Jamie	Nadia Stacey
2021 (24th)	The Souvenir Part II	Siobhan Harper-Ryan
2022 (25th)	Medusa Deluxe	Eugene Souleiman, Scarlett O'Connell
2022 (25th)	Aftersun	Oya Aygör and Murat Çağin
2022 (25th)	Flux Gourmet	Siobhan Harper-Ryan
2022 (25th)	The Origin	Niamh Morrison
2022 (25th)	The Wonder	Morna Ferguson and Lorry Ann King
2023 (26th)	Femme	Marie Deehan
2023 (26th)	All of Us Strangers	Zoe Clare Brown
2023 (26th)	How to Have Sex	Natasha Lawes
2023 (26th)	Polite Society	Claire Carter
2023 (26th)	Rye Lane	Bianca Simone Scott
2024 (27th)	Unicorns	Lisa Mustafa
2024 (27th)	Back to Black	Peta Dunstall
2024 (27th)	Firebrand	Jenny Shircore
2024 (27th)	Love Lies Bleeding	Megan Daum and Frieda Valenzuela
2024 (27th)	The Outrun	Kat Morgan
