= Make-Up Artists & Hair Stylists Guild Award for Best Special Makeup Effects in Television, Limited/Miniseries, or New Media Series =

Make-Up Artists and Hair Stylists Guild Award for Best Special Make-Up Effects in Television and New Media Series
- Country: United States
- Presented by: Make-Up Artists and Hair Stylists Guild (MUAHS)
- First award: 2014
- Currently held by: Glenn Hetrick, Rocky Faulkner, Nicola Bendrey, Chris Burgoyne; Star Trek: Discovery (2021)
- Website: Make-Up Artists & Hair Stylists Guild

The Make-Up Artists and Hair Stylists Guild Award for Best Special Make-Up Effects in Television and New Media Series is one of the awards given annually to people working in the television industry by the Make-Up Artists and Hair Stylists Guild (MUAHS). It is presented to makeup artists who work in Special Effects makeup, or "Prosthetic makeup", whose work has been deemed "best" in a given year. The award was first given in 2000, during the first annual awards, and was given when the awards were brought back in 2014. During the 2001 and 2002 ceremonies, as well as ceremonies from 2015 to 2018, the awards made the distinction between regular series and miniseries/television films. This was amended in 2019, when miniseries nominees were placed alongside continuing series, while television films and specials were given their own category.

== Winners and nominees ==
=== 1990s ===
Year	Program	Episode(s)	Nominees	Network
(1999); 1st	Best Special Effects Makeup – Television (for a Single Episode of a Regular Series – Sitcom, Drama or Daytime)			
(1999); 1st	Buffy the Vampire Slayer	"Living Conditions"	Todd McIntosh, Robin Beauchesne, Douglas Noe, Kenny Myers, Brigette A. Myre	The WB
(1999); 1st	L.A. Doctors	"Just Duet"	Bill Corso, Douglas Noe	CBS
(1999); 1st	Star Trek: Voyager	"Dark Frontier"	Michael Westmore, Scott Wheeler, James Rohland, Ellis Burman Jr.	UPN

=== 2000s ===
Year	Program	Episode(s)	Nominees	Network
(2000); 2nd
(2000); 2nd	MADtv	"Mad TV Goes to the Movies"	Jennifer Aspinall, Randy Westgate	Fox
(2000); 2nd	Angel	"The Shroud of Rahmon"	Dayne Johnson, David DeLeon, Stephen Prouty	The WB
(2000); 2nd	Buffy the Vampire Slayer	"New Moon Rising"	Todd McIntosh, Robin Beauchesne, Douglas Noe, Brigette A. Myre, Jay Wejebe	The WB
(2000); 2nd	Best Special Makeup Effects – Television (for a Mini-Series/Motion Picture Made for Television)			
(2000); 2nd	Gepetto		Michael Westmore, Earl Ellis, Mary Kay Morse	ABC
(2000); 2nd	Jackie Bouvier Kennedy Onassis		Leonard Engelman, Nicole Lapierre	CBS
(2000); 2nd	The Corner		Betty Beebe, Jeannee Josefczyk	HBO
(2001); 3rd	Best Special Effects Makeup – Television (for a Single Episode of a Regular Series – Sitcom, Drama or Daytime)			
(2001); 3rd	MADtv	"Episode #707"	Jennifer Aspinall, Randy Westgate, James Rohland, Stephanie L. Massie	Fox
(2001); 3rd	Buffy the Vampire Slayer	"Bargaining"	Todd McIntosh, Jay Wejebe, Veronica Lorenz, Brigette A. Myre	The WB
(2001); 3rd	Star Trek: Voyager	"The Void"	Michael Westmore	UPN
(2001); 3rd	Best Special Makeup Effects – Television (for a Mini-Series/Motion Picture Made for Television)			
(2001); 3rd	She Creature		Myke Michaels, Richard Wetzel, Shane Mahan, Stephanie Coffey	Cinemax
(2001); 3rd	The Day the World Ended		Myke Michaels, Richard Wetzel, Shane Mahan	Cinemax
(2001); 3rd	How to Make a Monster		Myke Michaels, Richard Wetzel, Shane Mahan	Cinemax
(2002); 4th	Best Special Makeup Effects – Television Series			
(2002); 4th	Buffy the Vampire Slayer		Peter Montagna, Brigette A. Myre, Carol Schwartz	The WB
(2002); 4th	MADtv		Jennifer Aspinall, Scott Wheeler, Randy Westgate, Julie Purcell, Nathalie Fratti, David Williams	Fox
(2002); 4th	Primetime Glick		Kristina Vogel, Kevin Haney, Brian Penikas, Kathleen Crawford	Comedy Central
(2003); 5th
(2003); 5th	Nip/Tuck	"Pilot"	James MacKinnon, Thomas R. Burman, Bari Dreiband-Burman	FX
(2003); 5th	MADtv		Jennifer Aspinall, Scott Wheeler, Randy Westgate	Fox
(2003); 5th	Nip/Tuck		Eryn Krueger Mekash, Thomas R. Burman, Pinky Babajian	FX

=== 2010s ===
Year	Program	Nominees	Network
(2013); 6th	Best Special Makeup Effects in Television and New Media Series		
(2013); 6th	The Walking Dead	Greg Nicotero, Jake Garber	AMC
(2013); 6th	Longmire	Steve La Porte	A&E
(2013); 6th	Vikings	Tom McInerney	History
(2014); 7th
(2014); 7th	The Walking Dead	Greg Nicotero, Jake Garber	AMC
(2014); 7th	Boardwalk Empire	Michele Paris, Joseph Farulla	HBO
(2014); 7th	Grimm	Barney Burman, Mike Smithson	NBC
(2014); 7th	Sleepy Hollow	Leo Corey Castellano, Mark Nieman	Fox
(2014); 7th	Sons of Anarchy	Tracey Anderson, Carlton Coleman, Margie Kaklamanos	FX
(2014); 7th	Best Special Makeup Effects in a Television Mini-Series or Motion Picture Made for Television		
(2014); 7th	American Horror Story: Freak Show	Eryn Krueger Mekash, Michael Mekash, Christopher Nelson	FX
(2014); 7th	Fargo	Gail Kennedy, David Trainor, Gunther Schetterer	FX
(2014); 7th	Houdini	Gregor Eckstein	History
(2014); 7th	The Knick	Justin Raleigh	Cinemax
(2014); 7th	Olive Kitteridge	Christien Tinsley, Gerald Quist, Hiro Yada	HBO
(2015); 8th	Best Special Makeup Effects in Television and New Media Series		
(2015); 8th	The Walking Dead	Greg Nicotero, Garrett Immel	AMC
(2015); 8th	The Knick	Justin Raleigh, Kevin Kirkpatrick, Kelly Golden	Cinemax
(2015); 8th	Penny Dreadful	Nick Dudman, Sarita Allison	Showtime
(2015); 8th	Saturday Night Live	Louie Zakarian, Jason Milani	NBC
(2015); 8th	Vikings	Tom McInerney	History
(2015); 8th	Best Special Makeup Effects in a Television Mini-Series or Motion Picture Made for Television		
(2015); 8th	American Horror Story: Hotel	Eryn Krueger Mekash, Michael Mekash, David LeRoy Anderson	FX
(2015); 8th	Fargo	Gail Kennedy, David Trainor, Christina Scott	FX
(2015); 8th	Killing Jesus	Clare Ramsey, Jo Grover	Nat Geo
(2015); 8th	Sons of Liberty	Davina Lamont, Simon Rose	History
(2016); 9th	Best Special Makeup Effects in Television and New Media Series		
(2016); 9th	Westworld	Christien Tinsley, Georgia Allen, Hiro Yada	HBO
(2016); 9th	Game of Thrones	Barrie Gower, Sarah Gower	HBO
(2016); 9th	Penny Dreadful	Nick Dudman, Sarita Allison	Showtime
(2016); 9th	Saturday Night Live	Louie Zakarian, Jason Milani, Tom Denier Jr.	NBC
(2016); 9th	The Walking Dead	Greg Nicotero, Jake Garber	AMC
(2016); 9th	Best Special Makeup Effects in a Television Mini-Series or Motion Picture Made for Television		
(2016); 9th	American Horror Story: Roanoke	Eryn Krueger Mekash, Michael Mekash, David LeRoy Anderson	FX
(2016); 9th	All the Way	Bill Corso, Andy Clement	HBO
(2016); 9th	The American West	Amy Wadford, Fiona Mifsud	AMC
(2016); 9th	Black Mirror: Men Against Fire	Kristyan Mallett, Tanya Lodge	Netflix
(2016); 9th	Roots	Elvis Jones, Adam Walls, Bailey Domke	History
(2017); 10th	Best Special Makeup Effects in Television and New Media Series		
(2017); 10th	Game of Thrones	Barrie Gower, Sarah Gower	HBO
(2017); 10th	The Orville	Howard Berger, Tami Lane, Garrett Immel	Fox
(2017); 10th	Saturday Night Live	Louie Zakarian, Jason Milani, Tom Denier Jr.	NBC
(2017); 10th	Stranger Things	Amy L. Forsythe, Jillian Erickson	Netflix
(2017); 10th	The Walking Dead	Greg Nicotero	AMC
(2017); 10th	Best Special Makeup Effects in a Television Mini-Series or Motion Picture Made for Television		
(2017); 10th	American Horror Story: Cult	Eryn Krueger Mekash, Michael Mekash, David LeRoy Anderson	FX
(2017); 10th	Black Mirror: USS Callister	Tanya Lodge	Netflix
(2017); 10th	Fargo	Gail Kennedy, David Trainor, Christina Scott	FX
(2017); 10th	Genius: Einstein	Davina Lamont, Göran Lundström	Nat Geo
(2017); 10th	Twin Peaks	Debbie Zoller, Richard Redlefsen, Jamie Kelman	Showtime
(2018); 11th	Best Special Makeup Effects in Television Series, Television Limited or Miniseries, or Television New Media Series		
(2018); 11th	Westworld	Justin Raleigh, Kevin Kirkpatrick, Thomas Floutz	HBO
(2018); 11th	American Horror Story: Apocalypse	Eryn Krueger Mekash, Michael Mekash, David LeRoy Anderson	FX
(2018); 11th	The Assassination of Gianni Versace: American Crime Story	Michael Mekash, Silvina Knight, David LeRoy Anderson	FX
(2018); 11th	Genius: Picasso	Davina Lamont, Göran Lundström, Natasha Lees	Nat Geo
(2018); 11th	Saturday Night Live	Louie Zakarian, Jason Milani, Tom Denier Jr.	NBC
(2019); 12th
(2019); 12th	Chernobyl	Daniel Parker, Barrie Gower, Paul Spateri	HBO
(2019); 12th	American Horror Story: 1984	Michael Mekash, Vincent Van Dyke, Carleigh Herbert	FX
(2019); 12th	Fosse/Verdon	Audrey Futterman-Stern	FX
(2019); 12th	Game of Thrones	Debbie Zoller, Vincent Van Dyke, David Presto	HBO
(2019); 12th	Star Trek: Discovery	Glenn Hetrick, James MacKinnon, Rocky Faulkner	CBS All Access

=== 2020s ===
Year	Program	Nominees	Network
(2020); 13th
(2020); 13th	The Mandalorian	Brian Sipe, Alexei Dmitriew, Samantha Ward, Scott Stoddard	Disney+
(2020); 13th	Hollywood	Eryn Krueger Mekash, Kerrin Jackson, Ana Gabriela Quinonez	Netflix
(2020); 13th	Lovecraft Country	Jayson Medina, Abraham Esparza, Nicole Walpert, Brian Steven Banks	HBO
(2020); 13th	Star Trek: Picard	James MacKinnon, Richard Redlefsen, Alexei Dmitriew, Vincent Van Dyke	CBS All Access
(2020); 13th	Westworld	Justin Raleigh, Kevin Kirkpatrick, Thomas Floutz	HBO
(2021); 14th
(2021); 14th	Best Special Makeup Effects in Television, Limited/Miniseries, or New Media Series		
(2021); 14th	Star Trek: Discovery	Glenn Hetrick, Rocky Faulkner, Nicola Bendrey, Chris Burgoyne	Paramount+
(2021); 14th	American Horror Stories	Jason Hamer, Cale Thomas, Hiroshi Yada, Cary Ayers	FX on Hulu
(2021); 14th	Impeachment: American Crime Story	Justin Raleigh, Kelly Golden, Chris Hampton, Thom Floutz	FX
(2021); 14th	This Is Us	Zoe Hay, Stevie Bettles, Tania McComas, Elizabeth Hoel Chang	NBC
(2021); 14th	The Witcher	Barrie Gower, Deb Watson	Netflix
(2022); 15th
(2022); 15th	Pam & Tommy	David Williams, Jason Collins, Mo Meinhart, Abby Lyle Clawson	Hulu
(2022); 15th	Angelyne	Vincent Van Dyke, Kate Biscoe, Mike Mekash, Abby Lyle Clawson	Peacock
(2022); 15th	Gaslit	Kazu Hiro, Richard Redlefsen, Mike Ornela	Starz
(2022); 15th	Guillermo del Toro's Cabinet of Curiosities	Sean Sansom, Mike Hill	Netflix
(2022); 15th	Stranger Things	Barrie Gower, Duncan Jarman, Patt Foad, Paula Eden	Netflix
(2023); 16th
(2023); 16th	The Last of Us	Barrie Gower, Paul Spateri, Sarah Gower, Paula Eden	HBO
(2023); 16th	Ahsoka	Alexei Dmitriew, Cristina Waltz, Ana Gabriela Quinonez, Ian Goodwin	Disney+
(2023); 16th	The Fall of the House of Usher	Ozzy Alvarez, Justin Raleigh, Kelsey Berk, Harlow MacFarlane	Netflix
(2023); 16th	The Marvelous Mrs. Maisel	Mike Marino, Richard Redlefsen, Kevin Kirkpatrick	Prime Video
(2023); 16th	Star Trek: Picard	James MacKinnon, Hugo Villasenor, Bianca Appice, Vincent VanDyke	Paramount+
(2023); 16th	The Witcher	Mark Coulier, Deb Watson, Stephen Murphy, Josh Weston	Netflix
(2024); 17th
(2024); 17th	The Penguin	Mike Marino, Michael Fontaine, Crystal Jurado, Diana Y. Choi, Claire Flewin	HBO
(2024); 17th	Evil	Joel Harlow, Jeremy Selenfriend	Paramount+
(2024); 17th	House of the Dragon	Waldo Mason, Emma Faulkes, Hannah Ecclestone, Heather McMullen	HBO
(2024); 17th	Interview with the Vampire	Tami Lane, Howard Berger, Polly McKay, Aneta Janíčková	AMC
(2024); 17th	The Lord of the Rings: The Rings of Power	Barrie Gower, Sarah Gower, Paul Spateri, Emma Faulks	Prime Video
