= 2nd Astra Creative Arts Awards =

Astra Film Creative Arts Awards

2nd Astra Film Creative Arts Awards
- Date: February 26, 2024
- Site: City Market Social House, Los Angeles, California
- Official website: hollywoodcreative.org

Highlights
- Most awards: Barbie; Oppenheimer (3)
- Most nominations: Oppenheimer (8)

The 2nd Astra Film Creative Arts Awards, presented by the Hollywood Creative Alliance, were announced on January 6, 2024, to recognize technical achievements in films of 2023. The ceremony took place on February 26, 2024, at City Market Social House in Los Angeles, California.

Following the renaming of the Hollywood Critics Association to the Hollywood Creative Alliance, the organization renamed its award ceremonies as the "Astra Awards". The name change was approved by the HCA's advisory committee on November 17, 2023, affecting the film, television, and creative arts ceremonies.

The nominations for both the film awards and the film creative arts awards were announced live on December 7, 2023, on HCA's YouTube channel, by actresses Anjali Bhimani and Melora Hardin, who were joined by Hollywood Creative Alliance's Vice Chair Yong Chavez, Head of Member Engagement Jeandra LeBeauf and Secretary Morgan Rojas. Oppenheimer led the creative arts awards nominations with eight, followed by Poor Things with six. Barbie and Oppenheimer won the most awards with three wins apiece.

== Winners and nominees ==
Winners are listed first and highlighted with boldface

**Best Casting**: **Barbie – Allison Jones and Lucy Bevan**; Air – Mary Vernieu and Lindsay Graham Ahanonu; American Fiction – Jennifer Euston; The Color Purple – Bernard Telsey, Tiffany Little Canfield, and Destiny Lilly; The Holdovers – Susan Shopmaker; Oppenheimer – John Papsidera	**Best Cinematography**: **Oppenheimer – Hoyte van Hoytema**; John Wick: Chapter 4 – Dan Laustsen; Killers of the Flower Moon – Rodrigo Prieto; Maestro – Matthew Libatique; Poor Things – Robbie Ryan; Saltburn – Linus Sandgren
**Best Costume Design**: **Poor Things – Holly Waddington**; Barbie – Jacqueline Durran; Chevalier – Oliver García; The Color Purple – Francine Jamison-Tanchuck; Guardians of the Galaxy Vol. 3 – Judianna Makovsky; Killers of the Flower Moon – Jacqueline West	**Best Editing**: **John Wick: Chapter 4 – Nathan Orloff**; Anatomy of a Fall – Laurent Sénéchal; The Holdovers – Kevin Tent; Killers of the Flower Moon – Thelma Schoonmaker; Oppenheimer – Jennifer Lame; Spider-Man: Across the Spider-Verse – Michael Andrews
**Best Hair and Make-Up**: **Maestro – Kazu Hiro, Siân Grigg, Kay Georgiou, and Lori McCoy-Bell**; Barbie – Ivana Primorac; The Color Purple – Carol Rasheed, Saisha Beecham, Lawrence Davis, and Tym Wallace; Dungeons & Dragons: Honor Among Thieves – Alessandro Bertolazzi, Ryo Murakawa, and Cristina Waltz; Guardians of the Galaxy Vol. 3 – Cassie Russek and Alexei Dmitriew; Poor Things – Nadia Stacey	**Best Publicity Campaign**: **Barbie**; John Wick: Chapter 4; M3GAN; Oppenheimer; The Super Mario Bros. Movie; Wonka
**Best Production Design**: **Barbie – Sarah Greenwood and Katie Spencer**; Asteroid City – Adam Stockhausen; Killers of the Flower Moon – Jack Fisk and Adam Willis; Oppenheimer – Ruth De Jong; Poor Things – James Price and Shona Heath; Saltburn – Suzie Davies and Charlotte Dirickx	**Best Score**: **Oppenheimer – Ludwig Göransson**; Elemental – Thomas Newman; Killers of the Flower Moon – Robbie Robertson; Poor Things – Jerskin Fendrix; Saltburn – Anthony Willis; Spider-Man: Across the Spider-Verse – Daniel Pemberton
**Best Sound**: **Oppenheimer**; Ferrari; John Wick: Chapter 4; The Killer; Maestro; Spider-Man: Across the Spider-Verse	**Best Visual Effects**: **Spider-Man: Across the Spider-Verse**; The Creator; Guardians of the Galaxy Vol. 3; Mission: Impossible – Dead Reckoning Part One; Oppenheimer; Poor Things

== Films with multiple wins and nominations ==
The following films received multiple awards:

Wins	Film
3	Barbie
3	Oppenheimer

The following films received multiple nominations:

Nominations	Film
8	Oppenheimer
6	Poor Things
5	Barbie
5	John Wick: Chapter 4
5	Killers of the Flower Moon
4	Spider-Man: Across the Spider-Verse
3	The Color Purple
3	Guardians of the Galaxy Vol. 3
3	Maestro
3	Saltburn
2	The Holdovers

== See also ==
- 3rd Astra TV Awards
- 6th Hollywood Critics Association Midseason Film Awards
- 7th Astra Film Awards
