= Loulia Sheppard =

English hair designer (1944–2025)

- Born: 15 December 1944
- Died: 28 January 2025 (aged 80)
- Occupation(s): Hair designer, hair stylist

Loulia Sheppard (15 December 1944 – 28 January 2025) was an English hair designer. Known for her work on films Fantastic Beasts and Where to Find Them, Now You See Me 2, Florence Foster Jenkins, Avengers: Age of Ultron, Guardians of the Galaxy, Anna Karenina, The King's Speech, and Victoria & Abdul, for which she was nominated with Daniel Phillips for Academy Award for Best Makeup and Hairstyling nomination at 90th Academy Awards.

Sheppard died on 28 January 2025, at the age of 80.

== Awards and nominations ==
=== Academy Awards ===
Year	Category	Nominated work	Result
2017	Best Makeup and Hairstyling	Victoria & Abdul (with Daniel Phillips)	Nominated

=== British Academy Film Awards ===
Year	Category	Nominated work	Result
2017	Best Makeup and Hair	Victoria & Abdul (with Daniel Phillips)	Nominated

=== Primetime Emmy Awards ===
Year	Category	Nominated work	Result
2001	Outstanding Hairstyling for a Miniseries, Movie or a Special	The Lost Empire	Nominated
2008	Outstanding Hairstyling for a Miniseries or a Movie	John Adams (with Jan Archibald)	Nominated
2011	Outstanding Hairstyling for a Miniseries or a Movie	The Pillars of the Earth (with Tricia Cameron)	Nominated
