= Josh Weston (make-up artist) =

English make-up artist

- Occupation: Make-up artist

Josh Weston, also known as Joshua Weston, is an English make-up artist. He won an Academy Award in the category Best Makeup and Hairstyling for the film Poor Things.

At the 77th British Academy Film Awards, he won a BAFTA Award for Best Makeup and Hair for Poor Things. His win was shared with Nadia Stacey and Mark Coulier.

== Selected filmography ==
- Stormbreaker (2006)
- Fred Claus (2007)
- Harry Potter and the Deathly Hallows – Part 2 (2011)
- Snow White & the Huntsman (2012)
- Poor Things (2023)
