= Larry M. Cherry =

American hairstylist

- Born: June 7, 1956
- Died: January 4, 2026 (aged 69)
- Occupation: Hairstylist

Larry M. Cherry (June 7, 1956 – January 4, 2026) was an American hairstylist. He won a British Academy Film Award in the category Best Makeup and Hair for the film Ma Rainey's Black Bottom.

Cherry died on January 4, 2026, at the age of 69.

At the 98th Academy Awards, his name was mentioned in the In Memoriam section.

== Selected filmography ==
- Ma Rainey's Black Bottom (2020; co-won with Matiki Anoff, Sergio López-Rivera and Mia Neal)
