= Jean-Pierre Eychenne =

French make-up artist

- Born: France
- Other names: J.P. Eychenne
- Occupation: Make-up artist

Jean-Pierre Eychenne is a retired French make-up artist. He is best known for his work on the film Cyrano de Bergerac (1990), for which he was nominated for an Academy Award and won a BAFTA Award.

== Awards and nominations ==
=== Academy Awards ===
Year	Nominated work	Category	Result	Ref.
1991	Cyrano de Bergerac	Best Makeup	Nominated	

=== British Academy Film Awards ===
Year	Nominated work	Category	Result	Ref.
1988	Jean de Florette	Best Make-Up Artist	Nominated	
1992	Cyrano de Bergerac	Best Make-Up Artist	Won	
