= Lisa Tomblin =

- Occupation: make-up artist
- Years active: 1987-present
- Parent: David Tomblin (father)

Lisa Tomblin is a film make-up department chief hairdresser.

On 24 January 2012, she was nominated for an Academy Award for the movie Harry Potter and the Deathly Hallows – Part 2. Her nomination was shared with Nick Dudman and Amanda Knight.

She is the daughter of the film producer, film director and assistant director David Tomblin.
