= Sarah Monzani =

- Born: 1949 (age 76–77)
- Occupation: Make-up artist
- Years active: 1975–present

Sarah Monzani (born 1949) is a make-up artist. In 1983, she won an Oscar and a BAFTA for her work in the film Quest for Fire.
