= Peter Montagna =

American make-up artist

- Born: March 27, 1952 (age 73); Brooklyn, New York, U.S.
- Occupation: Make-up artist

Peter Montagna (born March 27, 1952) is an American make-up artist. He was nominated for an Academy Award in the category Best Makeup and Hairstyling for the film Hitchcock.

== Selected filmography ==
- Hitchcock (2012; co-nominated for an Oscar with Howard Berger and Martin Samuel)
