= Tristan Versluis =

British make-up artist

- Occupation: Make-up artist

Tristan Versluis is a British make-up artist. He was nominated for an Academy Award in the category Best Makeup and Hairstyling for the film 1917.

== Selected filmography ==
- 1917 (2019; co-nominated with Naomi Donne and Rebecca Cole)
