= Carla Farmer =

American make-up artist

- Occupation: Make-up artist

Carla Farmer is an American make-up artist. She was nominated for an Academy Award in the category Best Makeup and Hairstyling for the film Coming 2 America.

== Selected filmography ==
- Coming 2 America (2021; co-nominated with Mike Marino and Stacey Morris)
