= Rebecca Cole (make-up artist) =

British make-up artist

- Occupation: Make-up artist

Rebecca Cole is a British make-up artist. She was nominated for an Academy Award in the category Best Makeup and Hairstyling for the film 1917.

== Selected filmography ==
- 1917 (2019; co-nominated with Naomi Donne and Tristan Versluis)
