= Paul Pattison =

Makeup artist

- Occupation: Makeup artist
- Years active: 1979–present
- Website: film-makeup.com

Paul Pattison is a makeup artist.

== Biography ==
Pattison, along with Lois Burwell and Peter Frampton, won at the 68th Academy Awards in 1995 for Best Makeup for the film Braveheart. He also won the BAFTA award for his work on Braveheart in 1996. In 2004 and 2012 he was a nominee for the Primetime Emmy Award for his work on Ike: Countdown to D-Day and Hemingway & Gellhorn. His work on Hemingway & Gellhorn also won the Online Film & Television Association award. Paul won the APDG and AACTA Awards for his work on Mad Max: Fury Road in 2015 and Lambs of God in 2019. He is also known for his work on The Cave. He was a member of the Academy of Television Arts & Sciences.

== Cinematography ==
=== Film ===
- Blonde (2022)
- The Old Guard (2020)
- Hobbs & Shaw (2019)
- Hellboy (2019)
- The Meg (2018)
- Atomic Blonde (2017)
- Singularity (2017)
- Lion (2016)
- All The Way (2016)
- Mechanic: Resurrection (2016)
- Furious 7 (2015)
- Mad Max: Fury Road (2015)
- The Expendables 3 (2014)
- Stonehearst Asylum (2014)
- Hummingbird (2013)
- Parker (2013)
- The Expendables 2 (2012)
- Hemingway & Gellhorn (2012, TV film)
- Killer Elite (2011)
- Hawke (2010, TV film)
- Tomorrow, When the War Began (2010)
- Action Replay (2010)
- The Waiting City (2009)
- Solomon Kane (2009)
- Dying Breed (2008)
- Blood & Chocolate (2007)
- Silent Hill (2006)
- The Cave (2005)
- Cash Truck (2004)
- Anacondas: The Hunt for the Blood Orchid (2004)
- Ike: Countdown to D-Day (2004, TV film)
- Lucy Ball Story (2003, TV film)
- Beyond Borders (2003)
- Love's Brother (2004)
- Scooby-Doo (2002)
- The Extreme Team
- The Monkey's Mask (2000)
- Mission: Impossible 2 (2000)
- Dear Claudia (1999)
- Praise (1998)
- Mr Nice Guy (1997)
- The Well (1997)
- Doing Time for Pasty Cline (1997)
- Beverly Hills Family Robinson (1996, TV film)
- Dead Heart (1996)
- Braveheart (1995)
- Rapa-Nui (1994)
- Body Melt (1993)
- Silver Brumby (1993)
- The Nostradamus Kid (1992)
- Spotswood (aka The Efficiency Expert) (1990)
- Farewell to the King (1989)
- Kangaroo
- Wind
- Return to Snowy River (aka The Man from Snowy River II) (1988)
- The Light Horsemen (1987)
- Ground Zero (1987)
- Marco Polo
- Tontine Massacre (aka Chichane)
- The Company
- Noah's Ark
- Twisted Tails

=== Television ===
- Lambs of God (2019)
- Dirt Game (2009, TV miniseries)
- Farscape (1999-2004)
- Moby Dick (1998, TV miniseries)
- Mission Top Secret (1992–95)
- The Flying Doctors (1988–96)
- Mission:Impossible (1988)
- The Far Country (1987, TV miniseries)
