= Julia Vernon =

British make-up artist

- Occupation: Make-up artist

Julia Vernon is a British make-up artist. She was nominated for an Academy Award in the category Best Makeup and Hairstyling for the film Cruella.

== Selected filmography ==
- Cruella (2021; co-nominated with Nadia Stacey and Naomi Donne)
