= Nicki Ledermann =

German makeup artist

- Born: January 8, 1968 (age 58); Kempten, Germany
- Occupations: TV and film makeup artist
- Years active: 1989 - present
- Partner: Anastas Michos
- Children: 3

Nicole "Nicki" Ledermann (born January 8, 1968) is a German make-up artist for TV and film, known for her character makeup and period creations.

Ledermann was nominated for an Academy Award for Best Makeup and Hairstyling in 2020 for her work on Joker (2019). This was Ledermann's first Academy Award nomination, as well as the first time in Academy Award history that a German artist was nominated in the Best Makeup and Hairstyling category.

== Early life ==
Born in Kempten, Germany and raised in Munich, Nicki majored in Latin and Fine Arts at Munich's Pestalozzi Gymnasium High School of the Performing Arts. After studying at the Conservatory of Music in Munich, she relocated to New York City in 1988 to become a makeup artist.

== Career ==
Ledermann began her career working in New York's independent movie scene in the early 1990s, working on the likes of Palookaville and Happiness before moving onto television and major motion pictures. In the 2000s, she worked on Sex and the City, as well as well-loved movies including P.S. I Love You and Enchanted. Ledermann has since designed makeup for some notable directors in the industry, including Steven Soderbergh, Martin Scorsese and The Coen Brothers. Ledermann is a six-time Emmy nominee for her work on shows such as: Sex and the City, Soderbergh's drama The Knick and Martin Scorsese's HBO series Vinyl. Ledermann won an Emmy Award for her makeup design for Martin Scorsese's pilot of Boardwalk Empire, whilst her work on The Devil Wears Prada earned Ledermann a BAFTA nomination. Some of Nicki’s most recent makeup design work includes the film musical The Greatest Showman and Martin Scorsese's The Irishman. Todd Phillips' Joker earned Nicki an Academy Award Nomination as well as a BAFTA Nomination. In 2019, Ledermann was invited to become an active member of both the British Academy of Film and Television Arts (BAFTA) and the Academy of Motion Picture Arts and Sciences.

== Personal life ==
Ledermann lives in Brooklyn, New York City with her partner, renowned Director of Photography Anastas Michos. She has three children: Ginger, Willa and Jamieson. She was formerly married to director Alan Taylor (director).

== Filmography ==
- "The Devil Wears Prada 2 (2026) (Department Head)
- "The Bride! (2025) (Department Head/Designer)
- "Is This Thing On? (2025) (Department Head/Designer)
- "Joker: Folie à Deux" (2024) (Department Head/Designer)
- "Sharper" (2023) (Department Head/Designer)
- "The Gilded Age" (2022) (Department Head)
- "Marry Me" (2022) (Department Head)
- "Many Saints of Newark" (2021) (Department Head/Designer)
- "Joker" (2019) (Department Head/Designer)
- "The Kitchen" (2019) (Department Head)
- "The Irishman" (2019) (Department Head)
- "The Greatest Showman" (2017) (Department Head/Designer)
- "The Only Living Boy in New York" (2017) (Department Head)
- "Snatched" (2017) (Department Head)
- "The Comedian" (2016) (Department Head)
- "Vinyl" (2016) (Season 1) (Department Head/Designer)
- "The Knick" (2014-2015) (Season 1 & 2)(Department Head/Designer)
- "The Other Woman" (2014) (Department Head)
- "Now You See Me" (2013) (Department Head, Reshoots, Add. Photography)
- "Fading Gigolo (2013)" (Department Head/Designer)
- "Side Effects" (2013) (Department Head/Designer)
- "Inside Llewyn Davis" (2013) (Department Head/Designer)
- "Disconnect" (2012) (Department Head/Designer)
- "Spring/Fall" (2011) (Personal makeup for Sigourney Weaver)
- "New Year's Eve" (2011) (Department Head/Designer)
- 2011 Academy Awards (Personal makeup for Anne Hathaway)
- "The Moth Diaries" (2011) (Makeup Design Consultant)
- "Too Big To Fail" (2011) (Department Head/Designer)
- "The Big Year, (2011)" (NY Department Head)
- "Sex and the City 2" (2010) (Personal Makeup for Kristen Davis)
- "After.Life, (2009)" (Department Head/Designer)
- "Valentine's Day" (2010) (Personal Makeup for Anne Hathaway)
- "Boardwalk Empire" (2010) (Department Head/Designer)
  - episode 1.01 "Pilot"
- "Bored to Death" (Department Head/Designer)
  - episode 2.01 "Escape from the Dungeon!" (2010)
  - episode 1.04 "The Case of the Stolen Skateboard" (2009)
  - episode 1.03 "The Case of the Missing Screenplay" (2009)
  - episode 1.02 "The Alanon Case" (2009)
- "Exit 19" (2009) (Department Head/Designer)
- "Get Smart, (2008) (Personal Makeup for Anne Hathaway)
- "P.S. I Love You" (2007) (Department Head)
- "Enchanted" (2007) (Department Head/Designer)
- "The Devil Wears Prada" (2006) (Department Head/Designer)
- "Failure To Launch" (2006) (Personal Makeup for Sarah Jessica Parker)
- "The Groomsmen" (2006)(Personal makeup for Brittany Murphy)
- "The Notorious Bettie Page" (2005) (Department Head/Designer)
- "Law and Order: Trial by Jury" (2005-2006) (Department Head)
  - episode 1.13 "Eros in the Upper Eighties" (2006)
  - episode 1.11 "Day" (2005)
  - episode 1.10 "Blue Wall" (2005)
  - episode 1.08 "Skeleton" (2005)
  - episode 1.07 "Bang & Blame" (2005)
  - episode 1.05 "Baby Boom" (2005)
  - episode 1.04 "Truth or Consequences" (2005)
  - episode 1.02 "41 Shots" (2005)
  - episode 1.01 "The Abominable Showman" (2005)
- "Sex and the City" (2000-2004) (Seasons 1,2,3,4) (Department Head/Designer/Personal Makeup for Sarah Jessica Parker, Kristen Davis)
- "Running Scared" (2006) (NY Department Head)
- "City By The Sea, (2002)" (Department Head)
- "Fifteen Minutes, (2001)" (NYC Personal Makeup to Edward Burns)
- "Glitter (2001)" (NY Department Head)
- "Before Night Falls" (2000) (NY Department Head)
- "Sidewalks of New York" (2001) (Department Head/Designer)
- "The In Crowd" (2000) (Department Head/Designer)
- "Turn It Up" (2000) (NY Department Head)
- "Down to You" (2000) (Department Head/Designer)
- "Passion of Mind" (2000) (NY Department Head)
- "Madigan Men" (2000) (Department Head/Designer)
  - episode 1.02 "Irish Men Can't Jump" (2000)
  - episode 1.01 "Pilot" (2000)
- "Talk to Me" (2000) (Personal Makeup for Beverly DeAngelo)
  - Season 1,
- "Jesus' Son" (1999) (Department Head/Designer)
- "Election" (1999) (NY/DC Department Head)
- "Boys Don't Cry" (1999) (Makeup/hair consultant for Hilary Swank)
- "Simply Irresistible" (1999) (Key makeup)
- "LateLine" (1999) (Personal makeup for Al Franken)
  - episode 2.04 "Kids 'N' Guns" (1999)
- "Coming Soon" (1999) (Department Head/Designer)
- "Row Your Boat (1998)" (Department Head/Designer)
- "Happiness" (1998) (Department Head/Designer)
- "Six Ways to Sunday" (1997) (Department Head/Designer)
- "A Fish in the Bathtub" (1999) (Department Head/Designer)
- "Louis & Frank" (1998) (Department Head/Designer)
- "New York Crossing" (1996) (Department Head/Designer)
- "Sudden Manhattan"' (1996) (Department Head/Designer)
- "Walking and Talking" (1996) (Department Head/Designer)
- "Caught" (1996) (Department Head/Designer)
- "Grind" (1997) (Department Head/Designer)
- "Under The Bridge" (1996) (Department Head/Designer)
- "Palookaville" (1995) (Department Head/Designer)

== Awards ==
=== Academy Awards for Academy Award for Best Makeup and Hairstyling ===
Year	Nominated work	Shared with	Result
2020	Joker	Kay Georgiou	Nominated

=== BAFTA Awards for Best Makeup and Hairstyling ===
Year	Nominated work	Shared with	Result
2020	Joker	Kay Georgiou	Nominated
2007	The Devil Wears Prada	Angel De Angelis	Nominated

=== EMMY Awards for Outstanding Makeup and Hairstyling ===
Year	Nominated work	Shared with	Result
2016	The Knick	Stephanie Pasicov, Sunday Englis, Tania Ribalow, Rachel Geary, Luann Claps, Cassandra Saulter	Nominated
2016	Vinyl	Sunday Englis, Tania Ribalow, Cassandra Saulter, Michel Laudati, Rachel Geary	Nominated
2015	The Knick	Stephanie Pasicov, Sunday Englis, Tania Ribalow, Rachel Geary, Luann Claps, Cassandra Saulter	Nominated
2011	Boardwalk Empire	Evelyne Noraz	Won
2003	Sex and the City	Judy Chin, Kerrie R Plant, Maryann Marchetti	Nominated
2001	Sex and the City	Judy Chin, Marjorie Durand	Nominated

=== Hollywood Makeup Artist and Hair Stylist Guild Awards for Best Period and/or Character Makeup ===
Year	Nominated work	Shared with	Result
2020	Joker	Sunday Englis, Tania Ribalow	Won
2018	The Greatest Showman	Sunday Englis, Tania Ribalow	Nominated
2003	Sex and the City	Judy Chin, Kerrie R. Plant	Won
2003	Sex and the City	Judy Chin, Kerrie R. Plant, Maryann Marchetti	Nominated

=== Critics' Choice Awards for Best Makeup ===
Year	Nominated work	Shared with	Result
2020	Joker	Kay Georgiou	Nominated
2020	The Irishman	Sean Flanigan, Carla White	Nominated

=== Hollywood Beauty Awards ===
Year	Nominated work	Result
2020	Outstanding Achievement in Makeup	Won
