= Howard Berger =

American make-up artist (born 1964)

- Born: 20 December 1964 (age 61); Burbank, California, U.S.
- Occupation: Special make-up effects creator
- Years active: 1977-present.
- Children: 3 (Kelsey, Travis, and Jake)

Howard Berger (born 20 December 1964) is a special make-up effects creator who is best known for his work on The Chronicles of Narnia films. He has over 200 films to his credit since 1977.

Berger is the co-founder of KNB EFX Group along with Robert Kurtzman and Greg Nicotero. The company specializes in prosthetic makeup, better known as special make-up effects, and has worked on over 400 film and television projects.

Berger also often works with Sam Raimi, whom he has been working with since 1986. Most recently they worked together on Oz the Great and Powerful.

He also has won an Emmy for the makeup in the TV show The Walking Dead.

== Oscar nominations ==
Both of these are in Best Makeup

- 78th Academy Awards-The Chronicles of Narnia: The Lion, the Witch and the Wardrobe. Shared with Tami Lane. Won.
- 85th Academy Awards-Nominated for Hitchcock, nomination shared with Peter Montagna and Martin Samuel. Lost to Les Misérables.

== Personal life ==
He has 3 children, named Kelsey, Travis, and Jake.
