= Peter Robb-King =

English make-up artist

- Occupation: Make-up artist

Peter Robb-King is an English make-up artist. He was nominated for an Academy Award in the category Best Makeup and Hairstyling for the 1985 film Legend. He was also nominated for the annual Makeup Artists and Hairstylists Guild Awards 2019 for the film Mary Poppins Returns.
