= Amanda Knight =

Make-up artist

- Born: Hounslow
- Occupation: make-up artist
- Years active: 1988-present
- Children: Billy Monger

Amanda Knight is a make-up artist.

On January 24, 2012, she was nominated for an Academy Award for the movie Harry Potter and the Deathly Hallows – Part 2. This was at the 84th Academy Awards in the category of Best Makeup. She shared her nomination with Nick Dudman and Lisa Tomblin.
