= Anne Morgan (make-up artist) =

American make-up artist

- Occupation: Make-up artist

Anne Morgan is an American make-up artist. She won an Academy Award in the category Best Makeup and Hairstyling for the film Bombshell.

== Selected filmography ==
- Bombshell (2019; co-won with Kazu Hiro and Vivian Baker)
