= Jan Archibald =

British hair designer and make-up artist (born 1949)

- Born: October 1949 (age 75)
- Occupations: Hair designer; make-up artist
- Years active: 1984–present

Jan Archibald (born October 1949) is a British hair designer and make-up artist. Her work in La Vie en Rose (2007) earned her the Academy Award for Best Makeup as well as a BAFTA Award for Best Makeup and Hair. She had previously won the latter award for her work in The Wings of the Dove (1997). She won the Primetime Emmy Award for Outstanding Hairstyling for a Miniseries or a Special for her work on Poor Little Rich Girl: The Barbara Hutton Story (1987).
