= Peter Frampton (make-up artist) =

British Oscar-winning makeup artist

- Born: London, UK
- Occupation: makeup artist
- Years active: 1969–1995
- Parent: Harry Frampton (1915–1992)

Peter Frampton is a British makeup artist. He won at the 1995 Academy Awards for Best Makeup for the film Braveheart, which he shared with Lois Burwell and Paul Pattison.

== Selected filmography ==
- Braveheart (1995)
- The Commitments (1991)
- Henry V (1989)
- Withnail & I (1987)
- Sid and Nancy (1986)
- The Emerald Forest (1985)
- Greystoke: The Legend of Tarzan, Lord of the Apes (1984)
- Pink Floyd The Wall (1982)
- Victor Victoria (1982)
- Raw Meat (1972)
