= Marese Langan =

British make-up artist

- Occupation: Make-up artist

Marese Langan is a British make-up artist. She was nominated for an Academy Award in the category Best Makeup and Hairstyling for the film Emma.

== Selected filmography ==
- Emma (2020; co-nominated with Laura Allen and Claudia Stolze)
