= Fabrizio Sforza =

Italian make-up artist

- Died: 12 October 2009; Rome, Italy
- Occupation: makeup artist
- Years active: 1970–2009

Fabrizio Sforza (died 12 October 2009) was an Italian makeup artist. He was nominated for an Academy Award in the category Best Makeup and Hairstyling for the film The Adventures of Baron Munchausen.

== Selected filmography ==
- The Adventures of Baron Munchausen (1988)
