= Lois Burwell =

British make-up artist

- Born: 1960 (age 65–66); UK
- Occupation: makeup artist
- Years active: 1981–present
- Spouse: John Toll (m. 1998)

Lois Burwell (born 1960) is a British makeup artist. She won the Best Makeup Oscar at the 68th Academy Awards for the film Braveheart, which she shared with Peter Frampton and Paul Pattison. She received her second Academy Award nomination at the 71st Academy Awards for Saving Private Ryan (losing to Elizabeth), which she shared with Conor O'Sullivan and Daniel C. Striepeke. She frequently collaborates with Steven Spielberg, having worked on five of his films.

== Personal life ==
Burwell is married to cinematographer John Toll. They have worked together on The Rainmaker, Almost Famous, Captain Corelli’s Mandolin and The Last Samurai, for which her husband won the Academy Award for Best Cinematography for the second time in a row.

She holds dual citizenships in the United States and the United Kingdom.

== Positions ==
In 2015, Burwell was elected the Governor for the Makeup Artists and Hair Stylists branch of the Academy of Motion Picture Arts and Sciences, and in 2017, she was elected the first Vice President of the Academy.

For the 7th season of Face Off Burwell replaced judge Ve Neill who was not able to be present for the competition.

== Selected filmography ==
- The BFG (2016)
- Lincoln (2012)
- War Horse (2011)
- War of the Worlds (2005)
- The Last Samurai (2003)
- Catch Me if You Can (2002)
- The Green Mile (1999)
- Saving Private Ryan (1998)
- The Fifth Element (1997)
- Mission: Impossible (1996)
- Braveheart (1995)
- The Muppet Christmas Carol (1992)
- Who Framed Roger Rabbit (1988)
- The Princess Bride (1987)
