= Julie Hewett =

Julie Hewett is an American makeup artist. She first began working in the field with the 1987 film The Whales of August and since then has gone on to work with films such as American Beauty, Spider-Man 2, Ocean's Eleven and The Artist. Hewett has her own cosmetics company, Julie Hewett Los Angeles.

== Awards and nominations ==
- Primetime Emmy Award for Outstanding Makeup for a Miniseries or a Movie (Non-Prosthetic) (2005, nominated for Mrs. Harris)
- Primetime Emmy Award for Outstanding Makeup for a Miniseries or a Movie (Non-Prosthetic) (2011, nominated for Cinema Verite)
- BAFTA Award for Best Makeup and Hair (2011, nominated for The Artist)
- Gold Derby Award for Makeup/Hair (2012, nominated for The Artist)
- BAFTA Award for Best Makeup and Hair (2013, nominated for Hitchcock)
- Saturn Award for Best Make-up (2013, nominated for Hitchcock)
- Italian Online Movie Award for Best Makeup (2014, nominated for Hitchcock)
- Artisan Award for Best Contemporary Makeup - Feature Motion Picture at the Hollywood Makeup Artist and Hair Stylist Guild Awards (2016, nominated for The Big Short)

== Film and television work ==
- 2017 Downsizing (makeup department head) (pre-production)
- 2016 Mother's Day (make up artist to Julia Roberts) (completed)
- 2016 Sleepless Night (makeup department head) (post-production)
- 2016 Hail, Caesar! (key makeup artist)
- 2015 The Big Short (makeup department head)
- 2015 Danny Collins (makeup artist: Annette Bening)
- 2014 Get on Up (makeup designer)
- 2013 Saving Mr. Banks (co-department head makeup - as Julie Hewitt)
- 2012 The Guilt Trip (makeup artist: Barbra Streisand)
- 2012 Hitchcock (makeup department head)
- 2012 Magic Mike (makeup department head)
- 2011 Jack and Jill (makeup artist: Mr. Pacino)
- 2011 The Descendants (makeup department head)
- 2011 The Ides of March (makeup department head)
- 2011 The Artist (makeup designer)
- 2011 Cinema Verite (TV Movie) (makeup artist: Diane Lane)
- 2010 Secretariat (makeup artist: Ms. Lane)
- 2010 The Last Song (makeup artist: Ms. Cyrus)
- 2009 State of Play (department head makeup: additional photography)
- 2009 The New Adventures of Old Christine (TV Series) (makeup artist - 1 episode)

- Too Close for Christine (2009) ... (makeup artist)

- 2008 The Women (makeup artist: Annette Bening) / (makeup department head)
- 2008 Leatherheads (department head makeup artist - as Julie Hewett Mu-Dh)
- 2007 Nancy Drew (makeup department head)
- 2007 Ocean's Thirteen (makeup department head)
- 2007 Because I Said So (makeup department head)
- 2006 The Good German (makeup department head)
- 2006 Running with Scissors (makeup artist: Ms. Bening)
- 2005 Flightplan (makeup artist: Jodie Foster - as Julie Hewitt)
- 2005 Mrs. Harris (TV Movie) (makeup artist: Ms. Bening)
- 2004 Ocean's Twelve (makeup department head)
- 2004 Eros (key makeup artist - segment "Equilibrium")
- 2004 Spider-Man 2 (makeup department head)
- 2004 Iron Jawed Angels (TV Movie) (makeup artist: Hilary Swank)
- 2003 Open Range (makeup artist: Ms. Bening)
- 2002 Solaris (makeup department head)
- 2001 Ocean's Eleven (makeup department head)
- 2001 The Man from Elysian Fields (makeup artist: Mick Jagger)
- 2001 Pearl Harbor (makeup department head)
- 2000 The Kid (key makeup artist)
- 2000 Cupid & Cate (TV Movie) (makeup artist: Mary-Louise Parker)
- 1999 American Beauty (makeup artist: Ms. Bening)
- 1999 Payback (makeup artist)
- 1998 Lethal Weapon 4 (makeup artist)
- 1997 Mousehunt (key makeup artist)
- 1997 The Peacemaker (makeup artist: Ms. Kidman)
- 1997 Inventing the Abbotts (makeup department head)
- 1997 Liar Liar (makeup artist: second unit)
- 1996 Mars Attacks! (makeup artist)
- 1996 Bastard Out of Carolina (key makeup artist)
- 1996 Matilda (additional makeup artist)
- 1995 Batman Forever (makeup artist)
- 1995 A Walk in the Clouds (key makeup artist)
- 1995 A Little Princess (makeup artist)
- 1994 Mother's Boys (key makeup artist)
- 1994 In the Line of Duty: The Price of Vengeance (TV Movie) (makeup artist)
- 1993 Freaked (makeup artist)
- 1993 House of Cards (makeup artist: Ms. Turner)
- 1993 For Their Own Good (TV Movie) (key makeup artist)
- 1992 The Public Eye (key makeup artist)
- 1992 Stormy Weathers (TV Movie) (makeup artist)
- 1991 The Linguini Incident (key makeup artist)
- 1991 Little Man Tate (makeup artist)
- 1991 Death Dreams (TV Movie) (head makeup artist)
- 1991 Guilty by Suspicion (key makeup artist - as Julie Hewitt)
- 1990 Meet the Applegates (key makeup artist)
- 1990 Welcome Home, Roxy Carmichael (makeup artist)
- 1990 The Grifters (makeup artist)
- ABC Weekend Specials (TV Series) (hair stylist - 1 episode, 1988) (makeup artist - 1 episode, 1988)

- Runaway Ralph (1988) ... (hair stylist - as Julie Hewitt) / (makeup artist - as Julie Hewitt)

- 1988 Heathers (makeup artist)
- 1988 The Unholy (makeup/hair: additional special effects unit)
- 1987 Funny, You Don't Look 200: A Constitutional Vaudeville (TV Movie documentary) (makeup artist - as Julie Hewitt)
- 1987 The Whales of August (makeup artist)
