= Frankenstein (film) =

The horror novel Frankenstein by Mary Shelley has inspired a number of films:

From the silent film era:

- Frankenstein (1910)
- Life Without Soul (1915)
- Il mostro di Frankenstein (1920)

A film series by Universal Studios:

- Frankenstein (1931)
- Bride of Frankenstein (1935)
- Son of Frankenstein (1939)
- The Ghost of Frankenstein (1942)
- Frankenstein Meets the Wolf Man (1943)
- House of Frankenstein (1944)
- House of Dracula (1945)
- Abbott and Costello Meet Frankenstein (1948)

A film series by Hammer Film Productions:

- The Curse of Frankenstein (1957)
- The Revenge of Frankenstein (1958)
- The Evil of Frankenstein (1963)
- Frankenstein Created Woman (1967)
- Frankenstein Must Be Destroyed (1969)
- The Horror of Frankenstein (1970)
- Frankenstein and the Monster from Hell (1974)

Other adaptations of the novel:

- Flesh for Frankenstein (1973)
- Frankenstein: The True Story (1973)
- Frankenstein Unbound (1990)
- Frankenstein (1992 film) (1992)
- Mary Shelley's Frankenstein (film) (1994)
- Frankenstein (US TV miniseries) (2004)
- Frankenstein (2004 film) (2004)
- Frankenstein (2007 film) (2007)
- Frankenstein (2015 film) (2015)
- Frankenstein (2025 film) (2025)

Adaptations loosely based on the novel:

- Frankenstein 1970 (1958)
- Young Frankenstein (1974)
- The Bride (film) (1985)
- I, Frankenstein (2014)
- Victor Frankenstein (2015)
- The Frankenstein Chronicles (2015 TV Series)
