= Tami Lane =

American prosthetic makeup artist

- Born: June 16, 1974 (age 51); Peoria, Illinois, U.S.
- Occupation: prosthetic makeup artist
- Notable work: The Hobbit: An Unexpected Journey; The Chronicles of Narnia: The Lion, the Witch and the Wardrobe

Tami Lane (born June 16, 1974) is an American prosthetic makeup artist who won the Academy Award for Best Makeup for the 2005 film The Chronicles of Narnia: The Lion, the Witch and the Wardrobe. She received an additional Academy Award nomination for the 2012 film The Hobbit: An Unexpected Journey.

== Life and career ==
Lane is a native of Peoria, Illinois, graduated from Woodruff High School, and graduated from Bradley University in 1996 with a Bachelor of Arts with a major in Art and emphasis in Graphic Design.

As a college student, she had the opportunity to visit makeup effects company KNB EFX Group in Los Angeles; after graduation she worked for KNB EFX with part-owner Howard Berger for four years before heading out on her own in 2000. She also worked on The Lord of the Rings film trilogy, The Green Mile, and Superman Returns.

In 2004, she was the lead prosthetic artist for The Chronicles of Narnia: The Lion, the Witch and the Wardrobe, leading a team of 42 makeup and prosthetic experts. For this movie, she and Howard Berger won the 2005 Academy Award for Best Makeup. In 2013, she, Peter Swords King, and Rick Findlater, were nominated for another Academy Award for Makeup, for The Hobbit: An Unexpected Journey.

She appeared on the first episode of the NBC show Identity with the identity of "Academy Award winner", but the contestant incorrectly identified Eve Plumb as the winner. Lane's identity was not revealed until the end of the show.
