= Jean Ann Black =

American make-up artist

Jean Ann Black is an American make-up artist best known for her work on films, particularly as a long-time collaborator with David Fincher, the Coen Brothers, Julia Roberts and especially Brad Pitt.

== Filmography ==
- A Serious Man
- Big Fish
- Born on the Fourth of July
- By the Sea
- Derailed
- Faster
- Greenberg
- Hail, Caesar!
- Legends of the Fall
- No Country for Old Men
- Ocean's Eleven
- Ocean's Thirteen
- Seven
- Spy Game
- The Big Lebowski
- The Curious Case of Benjamin Button
- The Ring
- The Tree of Life
- The Twilight Saga: Breaking Dawn – Part 1
- The Twilight Saga: Breaking Dawn – Part 2
- Water for Elephants
