= Jenny Shircore =

British make-up artist

- Born: British India
- Occupation: Make-up artist

Jenny Shircore is a British make-up artist. She won the Academy Award for Best Makeup for her work in Elizabeth (1998) and the BAFTA Award for Best Makeup and Hair for her work in Elizabeth and The Young Victoria (2009).

She was born in British India to an Armenian father and a French mother, moving to the United Kingdom at age 10.

Shircore is a well-known expert in creating visuals for historical dramas, particularly those of the Elizabethan era. She worked on high-profile film productions set in that period, including Elizabeth as well as its sequel, Elizabeth: The Golden Age (2007), and Mary Queen of Scots (2018).

== Awards and nominations ==
Year	Award	Category	Nominated work	Result	Ref.
1998	Academy Awards	Best Makeup and Hairstyling	Elizabeth	Won	
2009	Academy Awards	Best Makeup and Hairstyling	The Young Victoria	Nominated	
2018	Academy Awards	Best Makeup and Hairstyling	Mary Queen of Scots	Nominated	
1986	British Academy Film Awards	Best Makeup and Hair	Dreamchild	Nominated	
1998	British Academy Film Awards	Best Makeup and Hair	Elizabeth	Won	
2003	British Academy Film Awards	Best Makeup and Hair	Girl with a Pearl Earring	Nominated	
2007	British Academy Film Awards	Best Makeup and Hair	Elizabeth: The Golden Age	Nominated	
2009	British Academy Film Awards	Best Makeup and Hair	The Young Victoria	Won	
2011	British Academy Film Awards	Best Makeup and Hair	My Week with Marilyn	Nominated	
2018	British Academy Film Awards	Best Makeup and Hair	Mary Queen of Scots	Nominated	
2020	British Academy Film Awards	Best Makeup and Hair	The Dig	Nominated	
2015	British Academy Television Craft Awards	Best Make-Up & Hair Design	The Dresser	Won	
