= Lori McCoy-Bell =

American hair stylist

- Occupation: Hair stylist

Lori McCoy-Bell is an American hairstylist. She won a Primetime Emmy Award in the category Outstanding Hairstyling for her work on the television program Westworld. She also won a British Academy Film Award for the film American Hustle.

McCoy-Bell has been a longtime collaborator with film director David O. Russell. In 2024, she was nominated for an Academy Award in the category Best Makeup and Hairstyling for the film Maestro. Her nomination was shared with Kazu Hiro and Kay Georgiou.

== Selected filmography ==
- Silver Linings Playbook (2012)
- A Thousand Words (2012)
- American Hustle (2013)
- The House (2017)
- Only the Brave (2017)
- Zeroville (2019)
- El Camino: A Breaking Bad Movie (2019)
- Maestro (2023)
