= Paul LeBlanc (hairstylist) =

Canadian hairstylist (1946–2019)

- Born: 1946; Dieppe, New Brunswick, Canada
- Died: October 2, 2019 (aged 73); Dieppe, New Brunswick, Canada
- Other name: Paul Le Blanc
- Occupation: Hairstylist
- Years active: 1976–2010

Paul LeBlanc (1946 – October 2, 2019) was a Canadian Academy Award-winning hairstylist who won at the 1984 Academy Awards for Best Makeup and Hairstyling for the film Amadeus. He shared the Oscar with Dick Smith.

One of his first films was the Francis Ford Coppola-produced The Black Stallion Returns. LeBlanc continued to work for Coppola as well as for Lucasfilm, creating new hairstyles for the character of Princess Leia in Return of the Jedi.

In 2003, LeBlanc received the Lifetime Achievement Award from the Make-Up Artists and Hair Stylists Guild. He died at his home in Dieppe, New Brunswick, on October 2, 2019, at the age of 73.

== Selected filmography ==
- Black Swan (2010)
- No Country for Old Men (2007)
- The Terminal (2004)
- Moonlight Mile (2002)
- O Brother, Where Art Thou? (2000)
- Requiem for a Dream (2000)
- The Mask of Zorro (1998)
- Stepmom (1998)
- Jack (1996)
- The Quick and the Dead (1995)
- Casino (1995)
- Lorenzo's Oil (1992)
- We're No Angels (1989)
- Mississippi Burning (1988)
- Angel Heart (1987)
- Children of a Lesser God (1986)
- Amadeus (1984)
- Birdy (1984)
- The Black Stallion Returns (1983)
- Return of the Jedi (1983)
- More American Graffiti (1979)
