= Daniel Phillips (make-up artist) =

English special effects make-up artist

Daniel Phillips is an English special effects make-up artist known for his work on films Florence Foster Jenkins, Dracula Untold, Closed Circuit, The Duchess, The Queen, and Victoria & Abdul, for which he was nominated with Lou Sheppard for the Academy Award for Best Makeup and Hairstyling in the 90th Academy Awards.
