= Robert Pandini =

Canadian make-up artist

- Born: Robert A. Pandini; June 3, 1961 (age 63); Edmonton, Alberta, Canada
- Occupation: Makeup artist
- Years active: 1988–present

Robert Pandini (born June 3, 1961, in Edmonton, Alberta) is a Canadian make-up artist.

He was nominated at the 88th Academy Awards in the category of Best Makeup and Hairstyling for his work on the film The Revenant. His nomination was shared with Siân Grigg and Duncan Jarman.
