= Rick Findlater =

- Occupation: makeup artist
- Years active: 1997–present

Rick Findlater is a makeup artist who has worked on the makeup for The Lord of the Rings as well as The Hobbit films.

He was nominated for Best Makeup and Hairstyling at the 85th Academy Awards for The Hobbit: An Unexpected Journey. His nomination was shared with Peter Swords King and Tami Lane.

== Selected filmography ==
- Shang-Chi and the Legend of the Ten Rings (2021)
- Love and Monsters (2020)
- Mulan (2020)
- Mortal Engines (2018)
- Pirates of the Caribbean: Dead Men Tell No Tales (2017)
- San Andreas (2015)
- The Hobbit: The Battle of the Five Armies (2014)
- Unbroken (2014)
- The Hobbit: The Desolation of Smaug (2013)
- The Hobbit: An Unexpected Journey (2012)
- The Chronicles of Narnia: The Voyage of the Dawn Treader (2010)
- Avatar (2009)
- Flight of the Phoenix (2004)
- The Lord of the Rings: The Return of the King (2003)
- The Lord of the Rings: The Two Towers (2002)
- The Lord of the Rings: The Fellowship of the Ring (2001)
