= Naomi Donne =

British make-up artist

- Occupation: Make-up artist

Naomi Donne is a British make-up artist. She has been nominated for three Academy Awards in the category Best Makeup and Hairstyling for the films 1917, Cruella, and The Batman.

== Selected filmography ==
- 1917 (2019; co-nominated with Tristan Versluis and Rebecca Cole)
- Cruella (2021; co-nominated with Nadia Stacey and Julia Vernon)
- The Batman (2022; co-nominated with Mike Marino and Mike Fontaine)
