= Ivana Primorac =

Croatian make-up artist

Ivana Primorac (born in Zagreb in 1965) is a Croatian make-up artist and hairstylist. She began her career working in television after a job working for the BBC. Primorac later moved on to working in feature films, including Atonement, Sweeney Todd, The Reader, and Barbie. Primorac has earned various awards and nominations for her work.

== Career ==
Primorac started working as a hair and make-up artist in television. She wanted to work at the BBC, as she believed their training was the best and eventually got a job with the BBC-trained designers as a trainee. Primorac moved on to working in feature films and she has worked on many films since the nineties began, including Elizabeth, Gladiator, The Hours, Atonement, Sweeney Todd, The Reader, and Barbie. While working on the 2000 film, Billy Elliot, Primorac graduated to hair and make-up.

In 2009, Primorac donated her time to a television public service announcement promoting awareness of domestic violence. The announcement, titled Cut, starred actress Keira Knightley. Commenting on her rise to prominence within the film industry, Primorac said "You can't become a makeup artist overnight."

=== Notable recognition ===
Primorac has been nominated for five BAFTA awards for her work. Primorac has attended the Academy Awards’ "bake-off" sessions for The Hours, Cold Mountain and Sweeney Todd.

In 2018, Primorac and Flora Moody jointly won the Make-Up Artists and Hair Stylists Guild Award for Best Period and/or Character Make-Up in a Feature-Length Motion Picture, for Darkest Hour, as well as being jointly nominated for the Make-Up Artists and Hair Stylists Guild Award for Best Period and/or Character Hair Styling in a Feature-Length Motion Picture, also for Darkest Hour.

In 2024, Primorac and Marie Larkin and Clare Corsick jointly won the Make-Up Artists and Hair Stylists Guild Award for Best Period and/or Character Hair Styling in a Feature-Length Motion Picture, for Barbie.

== Filmography ==
Year	Film
1989	Djavolji raj
1990	Rosencrantz & Guildenstern Are Dead
1991	Bernard and the Genie (TV); Under Suspicion; The Case-Book of Sherlock Holmes: Shoscombe Old Place (TV); The Full Wax (TV)
1992	The Case-Book of Sherlock Holmes: The Master Blackmailer (TV)
1994	Sister My Sister; Second Best; The Memoirs of Sherlock Holmes: The Mazarin Stone (TV); The Memoirs of Sherlock Holmes: The Red Circle (TV); The Memoirs of Sherlock Holmes: The Golden Pince-Nez (TV); The Memoirs of Sherlock Holmes: The Three Gables (TV)
1995	A Midwinter's Tale; The Infiltrator (TV)
1996	Mary Reilly; Gulliver's Travels (TV)
1997	Spice World
1998	Elizabeth; Cousin Bette; Painted Angels; The Land Girls
1999	The Last Yellow; History Is Made at Night; A Kind of Hush; The War Zone
2000	Billy Elliot; Gladiator
2001	The Martins; Intimacy
2002	The Hours
2003	Cold Mountain; The Lord of the Rings: The Return of the King; The Core
2004	The Libertine; Hotel Infinity; The Village; Animal Passions (TV)
2005	Charlie and the Chocolate Factory
2006	Goya's Ghosts; Breaking and Entering
2007	Sweeney Todd; Atonement; Wednesday
2008	The Reader; Bringing the Past to Life: The Making of Atonement; The Other Boleyn Girl
2009	10 Minute Tales: Perfect Day (TV); 10 Minute Tales: Through the Window (TV); 10 Minute Tales: The Three Kings (TV); 10 Minute Tales: Let It Snow (TV); 10 Minute Tales: Ding Dong (TV); 10 Minute Tales: Deep & Crisp & Even (TV)
2010	The Last Airbender; Brighton Rock (post-production)
2011	Hanna (post-production); One Day; Extremely Loud & Incredibly Close
2012	Anna Karenina
2013	Labor Day; The Railway Man
2014	Grace of Monaco; The Imitation Game
2015	Steve Jobs; The Dressmaker
2016	Collateral Beauty
2018	Colette
2023	Barbie

== Notable Awards and Nominations ==
Year	Award	Film	Result
2002	BAFTA Award for Best Makeup and Hair	The Hours	Nominated (with Jo Allen and Conor O'Sullivan)
2003	BAFTA Award for Best Makeup and Hair	Cold Mountain	Nominated (with Paul Engelen)
2005	BAFTA Award for Best Makeup and Hair	Charlie and the Chocolate Factory	Nominated (with Peter Owen)
2007	BAFTA Award for Best Makeup and Hair	Sweeney Todd	Nominated (with Peter Owen)
2007	BAFTA Award for Best Makeup and Hair	Atonement	Nominated
2018	Make-Up Artists and Hair Stylists Guild Award for Best Period and/or Character Make-Up in a Feature-Length Motion Picture	Darkest Hour	Won (with Flora Moody)
2018	Make-Up Artists and Hair Stylists Guild Award for Best Period and/or Character Hair Styling in a Feature-Length Motion Picture	Darkest Hour	Nominated (with Flora Moody)
2024	Make-Up Artists and Hair Stylists Guild Award for Best Period and/or Character Hair Styling in a Feature-Length Motion Picture	Barbie	Won (with Marie Larkin and Clare Corsick)
