= Adruitha Lee =

Hair stylist

- Occupation: Hairstylist
- Years active: 1993–present

Adruitha Lee is a hairstylist. In 2014, she and Robin Mathews won an Academy Award for Best Makeup and Hairstyling for their work in the film Dallas Buyers Club. In 2018, she and Deborah La Mia Denaver were nominated for a BAFTA Award for Best Makeup and Hair for their work in the film I, Tonya, which also earned them a few other nominations.
