= Vivian Baker =

American make-up artist

- Occupation: Make-up artist

Vivian Baker is an American make-up artist. She won an Academy Award in the category Best Makeup and Hairstyling for the film Bombshell. She also won the Primetime Emmy Award for Outstanding Prosthetic Makeup.

== Selected filmography ==
- Bombshell (2019; co-won with Kazu Hiro and Anne Morgan)
