= Martin Samuel (hair stylist) =

British make-up artist

Martin Samuel MBE
- Occupation: Hair stylist
- Years active: 1974-present
- Spouse: Mary Samuel (1970-Present)

Martin Samuel is a British hair stylist who has been nominated three times in the category of Academy Award for Best Makeup and Hairstyling. He is most famous for doing the hair on the first three Pirates of the Caribbean movies along with Ve Neill. He has had over 55 credits since 1974.

Samuel was appointed Member of the Order of the British Empire (MBE) in the 2021 New Year Honours for services to international screen hair styling.

== Academy Award nominations ==
- 2003 Academy Awards-Nominated for Pirates of the Caribbean: The Curse of the Black Pearl, nomination shared with Ve Neill. Lost to The Lord of the Rings: The Return of the King.
- 2007 Academy Awards-Nominated for Pirates of the Caribbean: At World's End, nomination shared with Ve Neill. Lost to La Vie en rose.
- 2012 Academy Awards-Nominated for Hitchcock, nomination shared with Howard Berger and Peter Montagna. Lost to Les Misérables.

== Selected filmography ==
- The Man Who Fell to Earth (1976)
- Hitchcock (2012)
- Pirates of the Caribbean: At World's End (2007)
- Pirates of the Caribbean: Dead Man's Chest (2006)
- Pirates of the Caribbean: The Curse of the Black Pearl (2003)
