= Deborah La Mia Denaver =

American make-up artist

- Occupation: Make-up artist
- Years active: 1990–present

Deborah La Mia Denaver is an American make-up artist. She was nominated for an Academy Award in the category Best Makeup and Hairstyling for the film Ghosts of Mississippi.

== Selected filmography ==
- Ghosts of Mississippi (1996; co-nominated with Matthew W. Mungle)
