= Duncan Jarman =

British makeup artist

Duncan Jarman is a British make-up artist. He received Emmy awards for his work on Alice in Wonderland (1999) and Arabian Nights (2000). In 2016, he received his first Oscar nomination at 88th Academy Awards in the category of Best Makeup and Hairstyling for his work on the film The Revenant. His nomination was shared with Siân Grigg and Robert Pandini.
