= Jeremy Woodhead =

American make-up artist

- Born: London, England
- Occupation: Make-up artist

Jeremy Woodhead is a British make-up artist. He was nominated for an Academy Award in the category Best Makeup and Hairstyling for the film Judy.

== Selected filmography ==
- Judy (2019)
