= Christine Blundell =

British make-up artist

- Born: October 1961 (age 64); London, England, UK
- Occupation: makeup artist
- Years active: 1990-present
- Website: http://www.cbmacademy.com/

Christine Blundell (born October 1961) is a British make-up artist who won an Academy Award in the category of Best Makeup during the 72nd Academy Awards. She won for the film Topsy-Turvy. Her win was shared with Trefor Proud.

She has over 50 credits since her start in 1990 as well as a make-up academy based in London, the Christine Blundell Make-Up Academy (CBMA).
