= Kay Georgiou =

American make-up artist

- Occupation: Make-up artist

Kay Georgiou is an American make-up artist. She was nominated for two Academy Awards in the category Best Makeup and Hairstyling for the films Joker and Maestro.

== Selected filmography ==
- Joker (2019; co-nominated with Nicki Ledermann)
- Maestro (2023; co-nominated with Kazu Hiro and Lori McCoy-Bell)
