= Nadia Stacey =

British make-up artist

- Occupation: Make-up artist

Nadia Stacey is a British make-up artist. She won an Academy Award and was nominated for another one in the category Best Makeup and Hairstyling for the films Cruella and Poor Things.

== Selected filmography ==
- The Favourite (2018)
- Cruella (2021)
- Poor Things (2023)

== Selected awards and nominations ==
- 2022: Co-nominated for an Academy Award for Best Makeup and Hairstyling for Cruella with Naomi Donne and Julia Vernon
- 2024: Won the Academy Award for Best Makeup and Hairstyling for Poor Things with Mark Coulier and Josh Weston
