= Siân Grigg =

Welsh make-up artist

- Occupation: Makeup artist
- Years active: 1988–present

Siân Grigg is a Welsh make-up artist. She is best known for her blockbusters and critically acclaimed feature film projects such as Saving Private Ryan (1998), The Aviator (2004), The Departed (2006), Inception (2010) and Django Unchained (2012). Grigg is a BAFTA award winner. At the 58th British Academy Film Awards she won the BAFTA Award for Best Makeup and Hair for her work on The Aviator. In 2016, she received another nomination from BAFTA for Best Makeup and Hair and her first Oscar nomination at 88th Academy Awards in the category of Best Makeup and Hairstyling for her work on the film The Revenant. Her nomination was shared with Duncan Jarman and Robert Pandini.

Grigg is a former pupil of Ysgol Gyfun Gymraeg Glantaf, Cardiff Art College and the London College of Fashion, where she studied make-up and hair for film and television.

== Selected filmography ==
- Titanic (1997)
- Saving Private Ryan (1998)
- 28 Days Later (2002)
- The Aviator (2004)
- The Departed (2006)
- Inception (2010)
- Never Let Me Go (2010)
- A Little Bit of Heaven (2011)
- Something Borrowed (2011)
- J. Edgar (2011)
- Django Unchained (2012)
- Ex Machina (2015)
- The Revenant (2015)
- Far from the Madding Crowd (2015)
- Once Upon a Time in Hollywood (2019)
