= J. Roy Helland =

American make-up artist

- Born: January 28, 1943 (age 83); Glendale, California, U.S.
- Occupation: Make-up artist
- Years active: 1980–present

J. Roy Helland (born January 28, 1943) is an American make-up artist.

He has done the hair and make-up for Meryl Streep since her first New York stage appearance in Arthur Wing Pinero's Trelawny of the Wells at the Vivian Beaumont Theatre, in 1975, and in all of her movies since Still of the Night in 1982.

He and prosthetic designer Mark Coulier won an Academy Award, a BAFTA, the Gold Derby Award and an OFTA Film Award, and was nominated for an International Online Cinema Award for their work on the movie The Iron Lady. Roy also has an Emmy and another BAFTA, as well as being nominated for a third BAFTA, another OFTA Film Award and Gold Derby Award, an Awards Circuit Community Award and two Hollywood Makeup Artist and Hair Stylist Guild Awards.
