= Peter Owen (make-up artist) =

Make-up artist

- Occupation: Make-up artist
- Years active: 1982–present

Peter Owen is a make-up artist who won at the 74th Academy Awards in the category of Best Makeup for the 2001 film The Lord of the Rings: The Fellowship of the Ring. He shared his win with Richard Taylor.

== Selected filmography ==
- The Dark Crystal (1982)
- Dangerous Liaisons (1988)
- Wolf (1994)
- Marvin's Room (1996)
- The Peacemaker (1997)
- A Thousand Acres (1997)
- Sleepy Hollow (1999)
- Shadow of the Vampire (2000)
- The Lord of the Rings: The Fellowship of the Ring (2001)
- Zoolander (2001)
- The Lord of the Rings: The Two Towers (2002)
- The Lord of the Rings: The Return of the King (2003)
- Charlie and the Chocolate Factory (2005)
- Clash of the Titans (2010)
