= Nick Dudman =

British make-up effects and creature designer

Nick Dudman is a British make-up effects and creature designer for motion pictures.

Dudman and his team have created the make-up effects and the animatronic creatures in the Harry Potter films, garnering BAFTA Award nominations for six of the eight films in the series. He was also nominated for an Academy Award. Dudman got his start working on the Jedi master Yoda as a trainee to famed British make-up artist Stuart Freeborn, on The Empire Strikes Back. After apprenticing with Freeborn for four years, Dudman was asked to head up the English makeup laboratory for Ridley Scott's Legend. He subsequently worked on the makeup and prosthetics for such films as Mona Lisa, Labyrinth, Willow, Indiana Jones and the Last Crusade, Batman, Alien 3 and Interview with the Vampire, among others.

In 1995, Dudman's career path widened into animatronics and large-scale creature effects when he was asked to oversee the 55-man creature department for the Luc Besson film The Fifth Element, for which he won a BAFTA Award for Visual Effects. Since then, he has led the creatures/make-up effects departments on several blockbusters, including Star Wars: Episode I – The Phantom Menace, The Mummy, The Mummy Returns and consulted on the Costume effects for Batman Begins. Dudman designed the animatronics for Alfonso Cuaron's Children of Men.

In 2007, he was awarded the Genie Award for Best Makeup by the Academy of Canadian Cinema & Television for his work on Beowulf and Grendel. In 2013 Dudman was made an honorary fellow of Arts University Bournemouth. In March 2015, Dudman was nominated for the Fangoria Chainsaw Awards in the Category Best TV Make-up/Creature SFX.
