= Stacey Morris =

American barber and hairdresser

- Occupations: Barber, hairdresser

Stacey Morris is an American barber and hairdresser. She was nominated for an Academy Award in the category Best Makeup and Hairstyling for the film Coming 2 America.

In addition to her Academy Award nomination, she was nominated for six Primetime Emmy Awards in the category Outstanding Hairstyling, and for seven MUAHS awards, winning once. She has been a personal barber-stylist for Eddie Murphy, Anthony Anderson, Lil Nas X, and Alfonso Ribiero.

== Selected filmography ==
- Coming 2 America (2021; co-nominated with Mike Marino and Carla Farmer)
