= Mark Coulier =

Make-up artist

- Born: 1964 (age 61–62); Leyland, Lancashire, England
- Occupation: makeup artist
- Years active: 1988-present.

Mark Coulier (born 1964) is a British make-up artist and prosthetic makeup expert. He has received three Academy Awards for The Iron Lady (2011), The Grand Budapest Hotel (2014), and Poor Things (2023). He also received two Primetime Emmy Awards for Merlin (1998) and Arabian Nights (2000).

== Career ==
Coulier has worked in the Harry Potter film series, X-Men and The Mummy Returns. He and J. Roy Helland won the Academy Award for Best Makeup and BAFTA Award for Best Makeup and Hair for The Iron Lady (2011). Coulier received his second Oscar for the film The Grand Budapest Hotel at the 87th Academy Awards. He received his third Oscar for the film Poor Things at the 96th Academy Awards. His win was shared with Frances Hannon.

== Filmography ==
=== Film ===
- The Mummy Returns (2001)
- Harry Potter and the Philosopher's Stone (2001)
- The League of Extraordinary Gentlemen (2003)
- Harry Potter and the Goblet of Fire (2005)
- Harry Potter and the Order of the Phoenix (2007)
- Harry Potter and the Half-Blood Prince (2009)
- Harry Potter and the Deathly Hallows – Part 1 (2010)
- X-Men: First Class (2011)
- Harry Potter and the Deathly Hallows – Part 2 (2011)
- The Iron Lady (2011)
- World War Z (2013)
- Dracula Untold (2014)
- The Grand Budapest Hotel (2014)
- In the Heart of the Sea (2015)
- Spectre (2015)
- Suspiria (2018)
- Pinocchio (2019)
- Elvis (2022)
- Poor Things (2023)

=== Television ===
- Merlin (miniseries) (1998)
- Arabian Nights (Miniseries) (2000)
- Jason and the Argonauts (2000)

== Awards and nominations ==
| Year | Association | Category | Work | Result | Ref. |
|---|---|---|---|---|---|
| 2011 | Academy Awards | Best Makeup and Hairstyling | The Iron Lady | Won | |
| 2014 | Academy Awards | Best Makeup and Hairstyling | The Grand Budapest Hotel | Won | |
| 2020 | Academy Awards | Best Makeup and Hairstyling | Pinocchio | Nominated | |
| 2022 | Academy Awards | Best Makeup and Hairstyling | Elvis | Nominated | |
| 2023 | Academy Awards | Best Makeup and Hairstyling | Poor Things | Won | |
| 2011 | British Academy Film Awards | Best Makeup and Hair | The Iron Lady | Won | |
| 2014 | British Academy Film Awards | Best Makeup and Hair | The Grand Budapest Hotel | Won | |
| 2018 | British Academy Film Awards | Best Makeup and Hair | Bohemian Rhapsody | Nominated | |
| 2018 | British Academy Film Awards | Best Makeup and Hair | Stan & Ollie | Nominated | |
| 2020 | British Academy Film Awards | Best Makeup and Hair | Pinocchio | Nominated | |
| 2022 | British Academy Film Awards | Best Makeup and Hair | Elvis | Won | |
| 2023 | British Academy Film Awards | Best Makeup and Hair | Poor Things | Won | |
| 2024 | British Academy Film Awards | Best Makeup and Hair | Wicked: For Good | Nominated | |
| 1998 | Primetime Emmy Awards | Outstanding Makeup for a Miniseries, Movie or a Special | Merlin | Won | |
| 2000 | Primetime Emmy Awards | Outstanding Makeup for a Miniseries, Movie or a Special | Arabian Nights | Won | |
| 2000 | Primetime Emmy Awards | Outstanding Makeup for a Miniseries, Movie or a Special | Jason and the Argonauts | Nominated | |
| 2024 | Primetime Emmy Awards | Outstanding Prosthetic Makeup | The Witcher | Nominated | |
