= List of accolades received by the DC Extended Universe =

The DC Extended Universe (DCEU) is a shared universe centered on a group of film franchises based on characters by DC Comics and distributed by Warner Bros. Pictures. The associated media franchise also includes tie-in novels, comic books and video games, a podcast and a spin-off television series. Like the original DC Universe in the comics, the DCEU is established by crossing over common plot elements, settings, cast, and characters.

Titles in the DCEU have won an Academy Award and been nominated for three Annie Awards, seven Critics' Choice Movie Awards (winning two), 13 Critics' Choice Super Awards (winning two), 12 Golden Raspberry (winning four), five Grammy Awards, two Hugo Awards (winning one), three Golden Reel Awards, 14 MTV Movie & TV Awards (winning two), one Primetime Creative Arts Emmy Award, 35 Saturn Awards (winning one), and eight Visual Effects Society Awards, among others.

== Annie Awards ==
Accolades received by DC Extended Universe from Annie Awards
Category	Year	Title	Recipient	Result	Ref.
Outstanding Animated Effects – Live Action	2014	Man of Steel	Jonathan Paquin, Brian Goodwin, Gray Horsfield, Mathieu Chardonnet, and Adrien Toupet	Nominated	
Best Character Animation – Live Action	2022	The Suicide Squad	Thomas Becker, Daniel Cavalcante, Philipp Winterstein, Victor Dinis and Thiago Martins	Nominated	
Best Character Animation – Live Action	2023	Peacemaker	Michael Cozens, Mark Smith, Kai-Hua Lan, Selene McLean and Richard John Moore	Nominated	

== Critics' Choice Movie Awards ==
Accolades received by DC Extended Universe from Critics' Choice Movie Awards
Category	Year	Title	Recipient	Result	Ref.
Best Action Movie	2018	Wonder Woman	Wonder Woman	Won	
Best Actor in an Action Movie	2014	Man of Steel	Henry Cavill	Nominated	
Best Actress in an Action Movie	2016	Batman v Superman: Dawn of Justice	Gal Gadot	Nominated	
Best Actress in an Action Movie	2016	Suicide Squad	Margot Robbie	Won	
Best Costume Design	2018	Wonder Woman	Lindy Hemming	Nominated	
Best Visual Effects	2018	Wonder Woman	Wonder Woman	Nominated	
Best Visual Effects	2021	Wonder Woman 1984	Wonder Woman 1984	Nominated	

== Critics' Choice Super Awards ==
Accolades received by DC Extended Universe from Critics' Choice Super Awards
Category	Year	Title	Recipient	Result	Ref.
Best Actor in a Superhero Movie	2021	Birds of Prey	Ewan McGregor	Won	
Best Actor in a Superhero Movie	2022	The Suicide Squad	John Cena	Nominated	
Best Actor in a Superhero Movie	2022	The Suicide Squad	Idris Elba	Nominated	
Best Actor in a Superhero Series, Limited Series or Made-For-TV Movie	2023	Peacemaker	John Cena	Nominated	
Best Actress in a Superhero Movie	2021	Birds of Prey	Margot Robbie	Won	
Best Actress in a Superhero Movie	2021	Birds of Prey	Jurnee Smollett-Bell	Nominated	
Best Actress in a Superhero Movie	2022	Zack Snyder's Justice League	Gal Gadot	Nominated	
Best Actress in a Superhero Movie	2022	The Suicide Squad	Margot Robbie	Nominated	
Best Actress in a Superhero Series, Limited Series or Made-For-TV Movie	2023	Peacemaker	Danielle Brooks	Nominated	
Best Superhero Movie	2021	Birds of Prey	Birds of Prey	Nominated	
Best Superhero Movie	2022	Zack Snyder's Justice League	Zack Snyder's Justice League	Nominated	
Best Superhero Movie	2022	The Suicide Squad	The Suicide Squad	Nominated	
Best Superhero Series, Limited Series or Made-for-TV Movie	2023	Peacemaker	Peacemaker	Nominated	

== Golden Raspberry ==
Accolades received by DC Extended Universe from Golden Raspberry Awards
Category	Year	Title	Recipient(s)	Result	Ref.
Worst Actor	2017	Batman v Superman: Dawn of Justice	Ben Affleck	Nominated	
Worst Actor	2017	Batman v Superman: Dawn of Justice	Henry Cavill	Nominated	
Worst Actress	2024	Shazam! Fury of the Gods	Helen Mirren	Nominated	
Worst Director	2017	Batman v Superman: Dawn of Justice	Zack Snyder	Nominated	
Worst Picture	2017	Batman v Superman: Dawn of Justice	Batman v Superman: Dawn of Justice	Nominated	
Worst Picture	2024	Shazam! Fury of the Gods	Shazam! Fury of the Gods	Nominated	
Worst Prequel, Remake, Rip-off or Sequel	2017	Batman v Superman: Dawn of Justice	Batman v Superman: Dawn of Justice	Won	
Worst Prequel, Remake, Rip-off or Sequel	2021	Wonder Woman 1984	Wonder Woman 1984	Nominated	
Worst Screenplay	2017	Batman v Superman: Dawn of Justice	Chris Terrio and David S. Goyer	Won	
Worst Screenplay	2017	Suicide Squad	David Ayer	Nominated	
Worst Screenplay	2024	Shazam! Fury of the Gods	Henry Gayden and Chris Morgan	Nominated	
Worst Screen Combo	2017	Batman v Superman: Dawn of Justice	Ben Affleck and Henry Cavill	Won	
Worst Supporting Actor	2017	Batman v Superman: Dawn of Justice	Jesse Eisenberg	Won	
Worst Supporting Actor	2017	Suicide Squad	Jared Leto	Nominated	
Worst Supporting Actress	2021	Wonder Woman 1984	Kristen Wiig	Nominated	
Worst Supporting Actress	2024	Shazam! Fury of the Gods	Lucy Liu	Nominated	

== Golden Reel ==
Accolades received by DC Extended Universe from Golden Reel Awards
Category	Year	Title	Recipients	Result	Ref.
Outstanding Achievement in Sound Editing – Feature Underscore	2018	Wonder Woman	Christopher Benstead, Simon Changer, J.J. George, and Gerard McCann	Nominated	
Outstanding Achievement in Sound Editing – Feature Underscore	2019	Aquaman	J.J. George and Paul Rabjohns	Nominated	
Outstanding Achievement in Sound Editing – Feature Underscore	2021	Wonder Woman 1984	Gerard McCann, Ryan Rubin, Michael Connell, Timeri Duplat, Chris Barrett, Adam Miller, and Alfredo Pasquel	Nominated	

== MTV Movie & TV Awards ==
Accolades received by DC Extended Universe from MTV Movie & TV Awards
Category	Year	Title	Recipient(s)	Result	Ref.
Best Comedic Performance	2019	Shazam!	Zachary Levi	Nominated	
Best Comedic Performance	2022	Peacemaker	John Cena	Nominated	
Best Fight	2018	Wonder Woman	Gal Gadot vs. German Soldiers	Won	
Best Fight	2021	Birds of Prey	"Final Funhouse Fight"	Nominated	
Best Fight	2021	Zack Snyder's Justice League	"Final Fight vs. Steppenwolf"	Nominated	
Best Hero	2014	Man of Steel	Henry Cavill	Won	
Best Hero	2018	Wonder Woman	Gal Gadot	Nominated	
Best Hero	2019	Shazam!	Zachary Levi	Nominated	
Best Hero	2021	Wonder Woman 1984	Gal Gadot	Nominated	
Best Kiss	2019	Aquaman	Jason Momoa and Amber Heard	Nominated	
Best Movie	2018	Wonder Woman	Wonder Woman	Nominated	
Best Musical Moment	2022	Peacemaker	"Do Ya Wanna Taste It?"	Nominated	
Best Villain	2017	Suicide Squad	Jared Leto	Nominated	
Best Villain	2021	Birds of Prey	Ewan McGregor	Nominated	

== Saturn Awards ==
Accolades received by DC Extended Universe from Saturn Awards
Category	Year	Title	Recipient(s)	Result	Ref.
Best Action / Adventure Series (Streaming)	2022	Peacemaker	Peacemaker	Nominated	
Best Actor in a Film	2022	The Suicide Squad	Idris Elba	Nominated	
Best Actress	2018	Wonder Woman	Gal Gadot	Won	
Best Actress	2021	Birds of Prey	Margot Robbie	Nominated	
Best Comic-to-Film Motion Picture	2014	Man of Steel	Man of Steel	Nominated	
Best Comic-to-Film Motion Picture	2017	Batman v Superman: Dawn of Justice	Batman v Superman: Dawn of Justice	Nominated	
Best Comic-to-Film Motion Picture	2017	Suicide Squad	Suicide Squad	Nominated	
Best Comic-to-Film Motion Picture	2018	Wonder Woman	Wonder Woman	Nominated	
Best Comic-to-Film Motion Picture	2019	Aquaman	Aquaman	Nominated	
Best Comic-to-Film Motion Picture	2019	Shazam!	Shazam!	Nominated	
Best Comic-to-Film Motion Picture	2021	Birds of Prey	Birds of Prey	Nominated	
Best Comic-to-Film Motion Picture	2022	The Suicide Squad	The Suicide Squad	Nominated	
Best Costume Design	2018	Wonder Woman	Lindy Hemming	Nominated	
Best Costume Design	2019	Aquaman	Kym Barrett	Nominated	
Best Costume Design	2019	Shazam!	Leah Butler	Nominated	
Best Costume Design	2021	Birds of Prey	Erin Benach	Nominated	
Best Director	2018	Wonder Woman	Patty Jenkins	Nominated	
Best Director	2019	Aquaman	James Wan	Nominated	
Best Editing	2019	Aquaman	Kirk Morri	Nominated	
Best Make-up	2017	Suicide Squad	Allan Apone, Jo-Ann MacNeil and Marta Roggero	Nominated	
Best Make-up	2022	The Suicide Squad	Heba Thorisdottir, Greg Funk, Brian Sipe	Nominated	
Best Performance by a Younger Actor	2014	Man of Steel	Dylan Sprayberry	Nominated	
Best Performance by a Younger Actor	2019	Shazam!	Asher Angel	Nominated	
Best Performance by a Younger Actor	2019	Shazam!	Jack Dylan Grazer	Nominated	
Best Performance by a Younger Actor	2021	Birds of Prey	Ella Jay Basco	Nominated	
Best Production Design	2019	Aquaman	Bill Brzeski	Nominated	
Best Special Effects	2014	Man of Steel	Joe Letteri, John "DJ" Desjardin, Dan Lemmon	Nominated	
Best Special Effects	2021	Birds of Prey	Mark Hawker, Yael Majors & Greg Steele	Nominated	
Best Supporting Actor	2018	Wonder Woman	Chris Pine	Nominated	
Best Supporting Actress in a Film	2017	Suicide Squad	Margot Robbie	Nominated	
Best Supporting Actress in a Film	2019	Aquaman	Amber Heard	Nominated	
Best Supporting Actress in a Film	2021	Birds of Prey	Jurnee Smollett-Bell	Nominated	
Best Supporting Actress in a Film	2022	The Suicide Squad	Viola Davis	Nominated	
Best Supporting Actress in a Streaming Series	2022	Peacemaker	Danielle Brooks	Nominated	
Best Writing	2018	Wonder Woman	Allan Heinberg	Nominated	

== Visual Effects Society ==
Accolades received by DC Extended Universe from Visual Effects Society
Category	Year	Title	Recipients	Result	Ref.
Outstanding Created Environment in a Photoreal Feature	2019	Aquaman	Quentin Marmier, Aaron Barr, Jeffrey De Guzman, Ziad Shureih for "Atlantis"	Nominated	
Outstanding Created Environment in a Photoreal Feature	2022	The Suicide Squad	Nick Cattell, Jason Desjarlais, Matt Fitzgerald, Jerome Moo (for Valle Del Marre)	Nominated	
Outstanding Effects Simulations in a Photoreal Feature	2014	Man of Steel	Brian Goodwin, Gray Horsfield, Mathieu Chardonnet, Adrien Toupet	Nominated	
Outstanding Effects Simulations in a Photoreal Feature	2022	The Suicide Squad	David R. Davies, Rogier Fransen, Sandy Sutherland, Brandon James Fleet (for Corto Maltese City Destruction)	Nominated	
Outstanding Model in a Photoreal or Animated Project	2022	The Suicide Squad	Simon Dean Morley, Cedric Enriquez Canlas, Layne Howe, Alberto R. S. Hernandez (for Jötunheim)	Nominated	
Outstanding Special (Practical) Effects in a Photoreal Project	2023	Black Adam	JD Schwalm, Nick Rand, Andrew Hyde, Andy Robot (for Robotic Flight)	Nominated	
Outstanding Virtual Cinematography in a CG Project	2014	Man of Steel	Daniel Paulsson, Edmund Kolloen, Joel Prager, David Stripinis	Nominated	
Outstanding Virtual Cinematography in a CG Project	2019	Aquaman	Claus Pedersen, Mohammad Rastkar, Cedric Lo, Ryan McCoy for "Third Act Battle"	Nominated	

== Other ==
Accolades received by DC Extended Universe from Academy Awards, Hugo, Grammy, and Primetime Creative Arts Emmy Awards
Award	Category	Year	Title	Recipient(s)	Result	Ref.
Academy Awards	Best Makeup and Hairstyling	2017	Suicide Squad	Alessandro Bertolazzi, Giorgio Gregorini and Christopher Nelson	Won	
Hugo Awards	Best Dramatic Presentation, Long Form	2018	Wonder Woman	Patty Jenkins, Allan Heinberg, Zack Snyder, and Jason Fuchs	Won	
Hugo Awards	Best Dramatic Presentation, Long Form	2021	Birds of Prey	Cathy Yan and Christina Hodson	Nominated	
Grammy Awards	Best Compilation Soundtrack for Visual Media	2017	Suicide Squad (Collector's Edition)	Various Artists	Nominated	
Grammy Awards	Best Rock Performance	2017	Suicide Squad	"Heathens" by Twenty One Pilots (Tyler Joseph, songwriter)	Nominated	
Grammy Awards	Best Rock Song	2017	Suicide Squad	"Heathens" by Twenty One Pilots (Tyler Joseph, songwriter)	Nominated	
Grammy Awards	Best Song Written for Visual Media	2017	Suicide Squad	"Heathens" by Twenty One Pilots (Tyler Joseph, songwriter)	Nominated	
Grammy Awards	Best Song Written for Visual Media	2017	Suicide Squad	"Purple Lamborghini" by Skrillex and Rick Ross (Shamann Cooke, Sonny Moore and William Roberts, songwriters)	Nominated	
Primetime Creative Arts Emmy Awards	Outstanding Stunt Coordination for a Comedy Series or Variety Program	2022	Peacemaker	Peacemaker	Nominated	

== See also ==
- List of accolades received by Marvel Cinematic Universe films
