= List of accolades received by Suicide Squad =

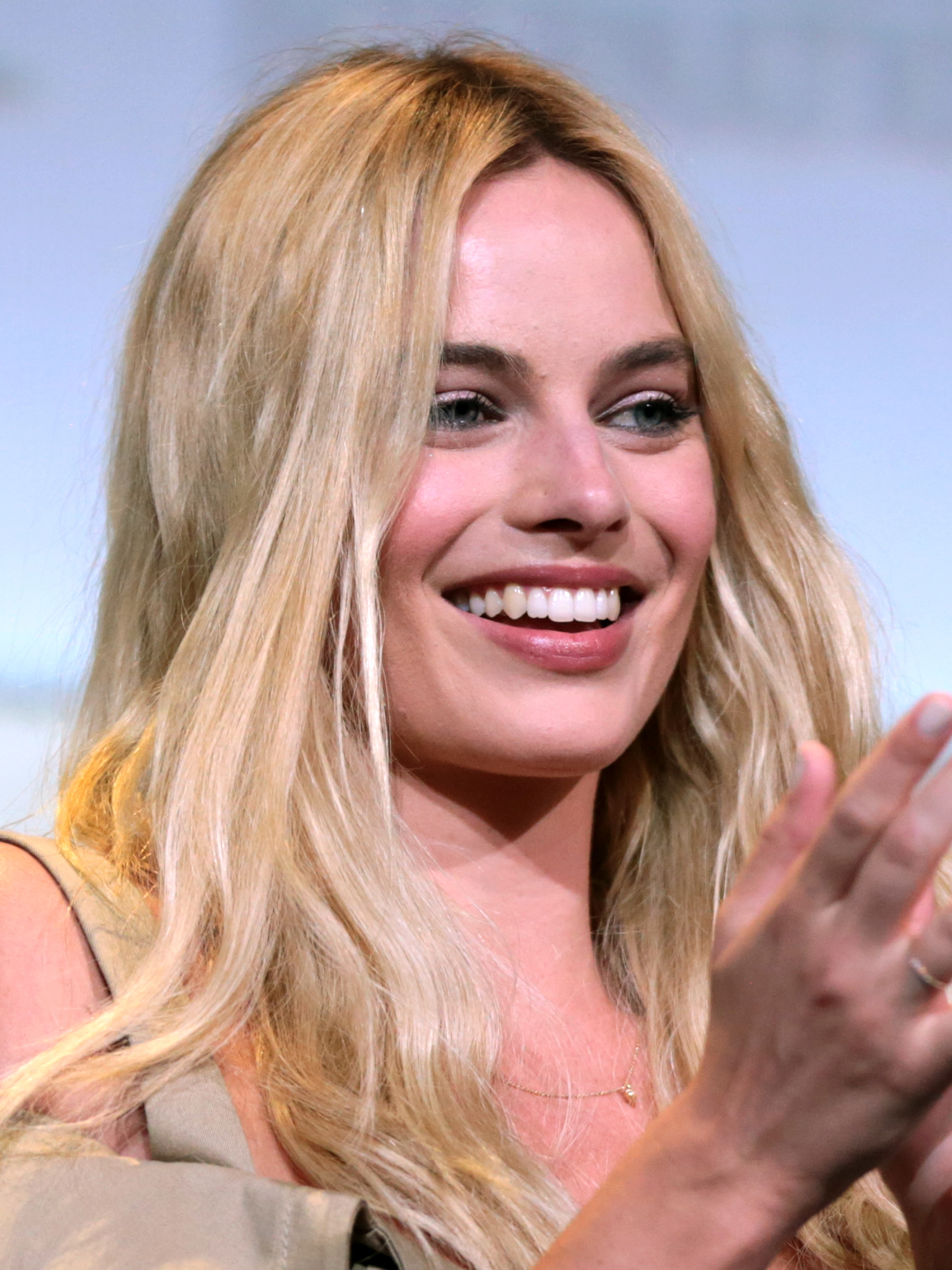
- Margot Robbie received the most nominations for her performance with a total of seven.
Accolades
Award	Won	Nominated
Academy Awards	1	1
Alliance of Women Film Journalists	0	2
Billboard Music Awards	0	1
Critics' Choice Movie Awards	1	1
Empire Awards	0	1
Golden Raspberry Awards	0	2
Grammy Awards	0	3
Hollywood Music in Media Awards	1	3
iHeartRadio Music Awards	0	1
Jupiter Awards	0	2
Make-Up Artists and Hair Stylists Guild	1	2
MTV Movie & TV Awards	0	1
Nickelodeon Kids' Choice Awards	1	1
NME Awards	0	1
People's Choice Awards	1	7
Saturn Awards	0	3
Teen Choice Awards	2	5
Village Voice Film Poll	1	1
- Total number of awards and nominations
Totals	9	39
- References

Suicide Squad is a 2016 American superhero film written and directed by David Ayer. The film stars Will Smith, Jared Leto, Margot Robbie, Joel Kinnaman, Viola Davis, Jai Courtney, Jay Hernandez, Adewale Akinnuoye-Agbaje, Ike Barinholtz, Scott Eastwood and Cara Delevingne. In the film, a secret government agency led by Amanda Waller recruits imprisoned supervillains to execute dangerous black ops missions and save the world from a powerful threat, in exchange for leaner sentences.

Suicide Squad, produced on a budget of $175 million, was released theatrically in the United States on August 5, 2016, following a strong debut that set new box office records. The film grossed over $745 million worldwide, making it the 10th highest-grossing film of 2016. It received generally negative reviews from critics, who criticized the plot, directing and characters, though Robbie's performance received praise. The film has garnered numerous awards and nominations with most nominations recognising the film itself and the performances of the cast.

Suicide Squad was nominated for three Grammy Awards as well as one Critics' Choice Movie Awards (winning one), seven People's Choice Awards (winning one) and received five Teen Choice Awards nominations, which were "Choice AnTEENcipated Movie", "Choice Movie Actor: AnTEENcipated" for Will Smith and Scott Eastwood, and "Choice Movie Actress: AnTEENcipated" for Margot Robbie and Cara Delevingne. It won in both the former and latter categories. The film won an Academy Award for Best Makeup and Hairstyling at the 89th Academy Awards, making it the only film in the DC Extended Universe to win an Academy Award.

== Accolades ==
Award	Date of ceremony	Category	Recipients	Result	Ref.
Academy Awards	February 26, 2017	Best Makeup and Hairstyling	Alessandro Bertolazzi, Giorgio Gregorini and Christopher Nelson	Won	
Alliance of Women Film Journalists	December 21, 2016	Hall of Shame	David Ayer and Margot Robbie	Nominated	
Alliance of Women Film Journalists	December 21, 2016	Actress Most in Need of a New Agent	Margot Robbie	Nominated	
Billboard Music Awards	May 21, 2017	Top Soundtrack	Suicide Squad (Collector's Edition) – Various Artists	Nominated	
BET Awards	June 25, 2017	Best Actress	Viola Davis	Nominated	
Critics' Choice Awards	December 11, 2016	Best Actress in an Action Movie	Margot Robbie	Won	
Empire Awards	March 19, 2017	Best Make-Up and Hairstyling	Suicide Squad	Nominated	
Golden Raspberry Awards	February 25, 2017	Worst Supporting Actor	Jared Leto	Nominated	
Golden Raspberry Awards	February 25, 2017	Worst Screenplay	David Ayer	Nominated	
Grammy Awards	February 12, 2017	Best Compilation Soundtrack for Visual Media	Suicide Squad (Collector's Edition) – Various Artists	Nominated	
Grammy Awards	February 12, 2017	Best Song Written for Visual Media	"Heathens" by Twenty One Pilots (Tyler Joseph, songwriter)	Nominated	
Grammy Awards	February 12, 2017	Best Song Written for Visual Media	"Purple Lamborghini" by Skrillex and Rick Ross (Shamann Cooke, Sonny Moore and William Roberts, songwriters)	Nominated	
Hollywood Music in Media Awards	November 17, 2016	Best Original Song – Sci-Fi/Fantasy Film	"Sucker for Pain" by Lil Wayne, Wiz Khalifa and Imagine Dragons with Logic, Ty Dolla Sign and X Ambassadors	Nominated	
Hollywood Music in Media Awards	November 17, 2016	Outstanding Music Supervision – Film	Gabe Hilfer	Nominated	
Hollywood Music in Media Awards	November 17, 2016	Best Soundtrack Album	Suicide Squad (Collector's Edition) – Various Artists	Won	
iHeartRadio Music Awards	March 5, 2017	Best Song from a Movie	"Heathens" by Twenty One Pilots	Nominated	
Jupiter Awards	March 29, 2017	Best International Film	Suicide Squad	Nominated	
Jupiter Awards	March 29, 2017	Best International Actor	Jared Leto	Nominated	
Make-Up Artists and Hair Stylists Guild	February 19, 2017	Best Special Make Up Effects – Feature-Length Motion Picture	Christopher Nelson, Sean Sansom and Greg Nicotero	Nominated	
Make-Up Artists and Hair Stylists Guild	February 19, 2017	Best Period and/or Character Makeup – Feature-Length Motion Picture	Alessandro Bertolazzi	Won	
MTV Movie & TV Awards	May 7, 2017	Best Villain	Jared Leto	Nominated	
NME Awards	February 15, 2017	Best Film	Suicide Squad	Nominated	
Nickelodeon Kids' Choice Awards	March 11, 2017	Favorite Soundtrack	Suicide Squad (Collector's Edition) – Various Artists	Won	
People's Choice Awards	January 18, 2017	Favorite Movie	Suicide Squad	Nominated	
People's Choice Awards	January 18, 2017	Favorite Action Movie	Suicide Squad	Nominated	
People's Choice Awards	January 18, 2017	Favorite Sci-Fi/Fantasy Movie	Suicide Squad	Nominated	
People's Choice Awards	January 18, 2017	Favorite Movie Actor	Will Smith	Nominated	
People's Choice Awards	January 18, 2017	Favorite Movie Actress	Margot Robbie	Nominated	
People's Choice Awards	January 18, 2017	Favorite Action Movie Actor	Will Smith	Nominated	
People's Choice Awards	January 18, 2017	Favorite Action Movie Actress	Margot Robbie	Won	
Saturn Awards	June 28, 2017	Best Comic-to-Film Motion Picture	Suicide Squad	Nominated	
Saturn Awards	June 28, 2017	Best Supporting Actress	Margot Robbie	Nominated	
Saturn Awards	June 28, 2017	Best Make-up	Allan Apone, Jo-Ann MacNeil and Marta Roggero	Nominated	
Teen Choice Awards	July 31, 2016	Choice AnTEENcipated Movie	Suicide Squad	Won	
Teen Choice Awards	July 31, 2016	Choice Movie Actor: AnTEENcipated	Will Smith	Nominated	
Teen Choice Awards	July 31, 2016	Choice Movie Actor: AnTEENcipated	Scott Eastwood	Nominated	
Teen Choice Awards	July 31, 2016	Choice Movie Actress: AnTEENcipated	Margot Robbie	Nominated	
Teen Choice Awards	July 31, 2016	Choice Movie Actress: AnTEENcipated	Cara Delevingne	Won	
