= Primetime Emmy Award for Outstanding Hairstyling =

Television award category

Primetime Emmy Award for Outstanding Contemporary Hairstyling
- Awarded for: Outstanding Contemporary Hairstyling
- Country: United States
- Presented by: Academy of Television Arts & Sciences
- First award: 2020
- Currently held by: Margo's Got Money Troubles (2026)
- Website: http://www.emmys.com/

Primetime Emmy Award for Outstanding Period and/or Character Hairstyling
- Awarded for: Outstanding Period and/or Character Hairstyling
- Country: United States
- Presented by: Academy of Television Arts & Sciences
- First award: 2020
- Currently held by: Bridgerton (2026)
- Website: http://www.emmys.com/

This is a list of winners and nominees of the Primetime Emmy Award for Outstanding Contemporary Hairstyling and Outstanding Period and/or Character Hairstyling. Prior to 2020, awards were split between miniseries or movies and ongoing series.

Beginning in 2024, the Outstanding Period and/or Character Hairstyling category will be renamed Outstanding Period or Fantasy/Sci-Fi Hairstyling.

In the following list, the first titles listed in gold are the winners; those not in gold are nominees, which are listed in alphabetical order. The years given are those in which the ceremonies took place:

== Winners and nominations ==
=== 1970s ===
Year	Program	Episode	Nominees	Network
1970	Outstanding Individual Achievement in Any Area of Creative Technical Crafts (Note: As a juried award, nominees had to garner 50% approval to win the award. The nominees did not meet the benchmark and no award was given.)			
1970	The Don Adams Special: Hooray for Hollywood		Edie Panda	CBS
1974	Outstanding Individual Achievement in Any Area of Creative Technical Crafts (Note: As a juried award, nominees had to garner 50% approval to win the award.)			
1974	Benjamin Franklin		Lynda Gurasich	CBS
1974	The Sonny & Cher Comedy Hour		Rena Leuschner	CBS
1975	Outstanding Individual Achievement in Any Area of Creative Technical Crafts (Note: As a juried award, nominees had to garner 50% approval to win the award.)			
1975	Benjamin Franklin	"The Ambassador"	Edie Panda	CBS
1975	Little House on the Prairie	"If I Should Wake Before I Die"	Larry Germain	NBC
1976	Outstanding Individual Achievement in Any Area of Creative Technical Crafts (Note: As a juried award, nominees had to garner 50% approval to win the award.)			
1976	Eleanor and Franklin		Billie Laughridge, Jean Burt Reilly	ABC
1977	Outstanding Individual Achievement in Any Area of Creative Technical Crafts (Note: As a juried award, nominees had to garner 50% approval to win the award.)			
1977	Eleanor and Franklin: The White House Years		Emma di Vittorio, Vivienne Walker	ABC
1977	The Great Houdini		Naomi Cavin	ABC
1977	Little House on the Prairie	"To Live with Fear"	Larry Germain	NBC
1978	Outstanding Individual Achievement in Any Area of Creative Technical Crafts (Note: As a juried award, nominees had to garner 50% approval to win the award. The nominees did not meet the benchmark and no award was given.)			
1978	The Awakening Land	"Part 3"	Sugar Blymyer	NBC
1978	Little House on the Prairie	"Here Comes the Brides"	Larry Germain, Gladys Witten	NBC

Outstanding Achievement in Hairstyling

Year	Program	Episode	Nominees	Network
1979
1979	The Triangle Factory Fire Scandal		Janice D. Brandow	NBC
1979	Backstairs at the White House	"Book Four"	Susan Germaine, Lola Kemp, Vivian McAteer	NBC
1979	Ike: The War Years	"Part 3"	Jean Burt Reilly	ABC

=== 1980s ===
Year	Program	Episode	Nominees	Network
1980
1980	The Miracle Worker		Larry Germain, Donna Barrett Gilbert	NBC
1980	Fantasy Island	"Dr. Jekyll and Ms. Hyde/Aphrodite"	Joan Phillips	ABC
1980	Haywire		Carolyn Elias, Bette Iverson	CBS
1980	Murder Can Hurt You		Naomi Cavin, Mary Hadley	ABC
1980	The Silent Lovers		Leonard Drake	NBC
1981
1981	Madame X		Shirley Padgett	NBC
1981	Father Damien: The Leper Priest		Janice D. Brandow	NBC
1981	The Jayne Mansfield Story		Silvia Abascal, Janis Clark	CBS
1981	Little House on the Prairie	"To See the Light"	Larry Germain	NBC
1981	Lou Grant	"Stroke"	Jean Austin	CBS
1982
1982	Eleanor, First Lady of the World		Hazel Catmull	CBS
1982	Cagney & Lacey	"Street Scene"	Stephen Robinette	CBS
1982	Fame	"The Strike"	Gloria Montemayor	NBC
1982	Jacqueline Bouvier Kennedy		Emma M. diVittorio, Dione Taylor	ABC
1982	Marco Polo	"Part 4"	Renata Magnanti, Elda Magnanti	NBC
1983
1983	Rosie: The Rosemary Clooney Story		Edie Panda	CBS
1983	The Life and Adventures of Nicholas Nickleby		Mark Nelson	Syndicated
1983	Missing Children: A Mother's Story		Janice D. Brandow	CBS
1983	Wizards and Warriors	"The Rescue"	Sharleen Rassi	CBS
1984
1984	The Mystic Warrior		Dino Ganzino	ABC
1984	The Day After		Dorothea Long, Judy Crown	ABC
1984	Dempsey		Adele Taylor	CBS
1984	George Washington	"Part 1"	Janice D. Brandow, Shirley Crawford, Irene Aparicio, Cathy Engel, Emma M. diVittorio	CBS
1984	Samson and Delilah		Jan Van Uchelen	ABC
1985
1985	The Jesse Owens Story		Robert L. Stevenson	OPT
1985	The Atlanta Child Murders		Janice D. Brandow, Robert L. Stevenson	CBS
1985	The Burning Bed		Stephen Robinette	NBC
1985	Love Lives On		Vivian McAteer	ABC
1985	My Wicked, Wicked Ways: The Legend of Errol Flynn		Adele Taylor	CBS
1985	Robert Kennedy and His Times	"Part 1"	Lynda Gurasich	CBS
1986	Outstanding Hairstyling for a Miniseries or a Special			
1986	Second Serve		K.G. Ramsey	CBS
1986	Alice in Wonderland	"Part 1"	Josée Normand, Jo Thomas	CBS
1986	North and South	"Part 1"	Yolanda Toussieng, Shirley Crawford	ABC
1986	North and South, Book II	"Part 1"	Virginia Darcy	ABC
1986	Outstanding Hairstyling for a Series			
1986	Amazing Stories	"Gather Ye Acorns"	Bunny Parker	NBC
1986	Dynasty	"Masquerade"	Gerald Solomon, Cherie, Linda Leiter Sharp	ABC
1986	Moonlighting	"The Dream Sequence Always Rings Twice"	Judy Crown, Josée Normand	ABC
1987	Outstanding Hairstyling for a Miniseries or a Special			
1987	The Two Mrs. Grenvilles	"Part 2"	Marsha Lewis, Mike Lockey, Sydney Guilaroff	NBC
1987	Amerika	"Part 3"	Virginia Kearns	ABC
1987	Fresno	"Part 4"	Carol A. O'Connell, Janice Alexander	CBS
1987	George Washington II: The Forging of a Nation	"Part 2"	Shirley Crawford, Irene Aparicio, Cathy Engel, Gus Le Pre	CBS
1987	A Year in the Life	"Springtime/Autumn"	Janice D. Brandow	NBC
1987	Outstanding Hairstyling for a Series			
1987	Moonlighting	"Atomic Shakespeare"	Kathryn Blondell, Josée Normand	ABC
1987	Crime Story	"Top of the World"	Bunny Parker	NBC
1987	Dynasty	"The Ball"	Gerald Solomon, Cherie	ABC
1987	The Facts of Life	"62 Pickup"	JoAnn Stafford-Chaney, Phillip Ackerman	NBC
1987	Max Headroom	"Body Banks"	Janice Alexander	ABC
1988	Outstanding Hairstyling for a Miniseries or a Special			
1988	Poor Little Rich Girl: The Barbara Hutton Story		Claudia Thompson, Aaron F. Quarles, Jan Archibald, Stephen Rose	NBC
1988	Elvis and Me		Russell Smith	ABC
1988	Lincoln		Kelvin R. Trahan	NBC
1988	Right to Die		N. Kristine Chadwick, Kathy W. Estocin	NBC
1988	Outstanding Hairstyling for a Series			
1988	Designing Women	"I'll Be Seeing You"	Judy Crown, Monique DeSart	CBS
1988	Crime Story	"Moulin Rouge"	Bunny Parker	NBC
1988	Dynasty	"The Fair"	Gerald Solomon, Cherie, Monica Helpman	ABC
1988	Frank's Place	"Dueling Voodoo"	Ora Green	CBS
1988	Star Trek: The Next Generation	"Haven"	Richard Sabre	Syndicated
1989	Outstanding Hairstyling for a Miniseries or a Special			
1989	Jack the Ripper	"Part 1"	Betty Glasow, Stevie Hall, Elaine Bowerbank	CBS
1989	Around the World in 80 Days	"Part 1"	Dorothy D. Fox, Maria Rizzo, Wendy Rawson, Fung Wai Man	NBC
1989	Lonesome Dove	"On the Trail"	Philip Leto, Manlio Rocchetti	CBS
1989	War and Remembrance	"Part 3"	Janis Clark, Dino Ganziano, Chris Taylor, Jan Archibald	ABC
1989	Outstanding Hairstyling for a Series			
1989	Quantum Leap	"Double Identity"	Virginia Kearns	NBC
1989	Almost Grown	"If This Diamond Ring Don't Shine"	Susan Schuler-Page, Sharleen Rassi	CBS
1989	Star Trek: The Next Generation	"Unnatural Selection"	Richard Sabre, Georgina Williams	Syndicated
1989	Thirtysomething	"We'll Meet Again"	Carol Pershing	ABC
1989	The Tracey Ullman Show	"The Subway"	Billy Laughridge	Fox

=== 1990s ===
Year	Program	Episode	Nominees	Network
1990	Outstanding Hairstyling for a Miniseries or a Special			
1990	Fall from Grace		Janice Alexander, Dorothy Andre	NBC
1990	The Phantom of the Opera	"Part 1"	Cédric Chami	NBC
1990	Billy Crystal: Midnight Train to Moscow		Janice Alexander	HBO
1990	Blind Faith	"Part 1"	Carolyn Elias	NBC
1990	Great Expectations	"Part 2"	Eithne Fennel	Disney
1990	Outstanding Hairstyling for a Series			
1990	The Tracey Ullman Show	"My Date With Il Duce," "The Thrill Is Gone," "The Wrong Message"	Linle White, Peggy Shannon	Fox
1990	Guns of Paradise	"A Gathering of Guns"	Linda Leiter Sharp	CBS
1990	Murder, She Wrote	"When the Fat Lady Sings"	Ronald W. Smith, Gerald Solomon, Rita Bellissimo, Dino Ganziano, Ann Wadlington	CBS
1990	Star Trek: The Next Generation	"Hollow Pursuits"	Vivian McAteer, Barbara Lampson, Rita Bellissimo	Syndicated
1990	Thirtysomething	"Strangers"	Carol Pershing	ABC
1991	Outstanding Hairstyling for a Miniseries or a Special			
1991	The Josephine Baker Story		Aldo Signoretti, Ferdinando Merolla, Jánosné Kajtár	HBO
1991	An Inconvenient Woman	"Part 2"	Anthony Esposito	ABC
1991	Lucy & Desi: Before the Laughter		Jeffrey Sacino	CBS
1991	Jackie Collins' Lucky/Chances	"Part 1"	Carolyn Elias, Barbara Lampson	NBC
1991	Son of the Morning Star	"Part 2"	Marsha Lewis, Jennifer Bell, Casey Camp-Horinek, Beth Miller	ABC
1991	Outstanding Hairstyling for a Series			
1991	Dark Shadows	"Episode 8"	Dee-Dee Petty, Jan Van Uchelen, Susan Boyd	NBC
1991	Anything but Love	"Long Day's Journey Into... What?"	Joanne Harris, Gus Le Pre, Peggy Shannon	ABC
1992	Outstanding Hairstyling for a Miniseries or a Special			
1992	Miss Rose White		Terry Baliel	NBC
1992	Homefront	"S.N.A.F.U."	Georgina Williams, Jerry Gugliemotto	ABC
1992	Marilyn and Me		Linle White	ABC
1992	O Pioneers!		Arturo Rojas	CBS
1992	Young Indiana Jones and the Curse of the Jackal		Meinir Jones-Lewis, Tricia Cameron	ABC
1992	Outstanding Hairstyling for a Series			
1992	Homefront	"Man This Joint Is Jumping"	Jerry Gugliemotto, Barbara Ronci	ABC
1992	In Living Color	"310"	Pauletta O. Lewis, Victoria Wood, Pinky Cunningham	Fox
1992	Sessions	"Thursday We Eat Italian"	Lucia Mace	HBO
1992	Star Trek: The Next Generation	"Cost of Living"	Joy Zapata, Patricia Miller	Syndicated
1993	Outstanding Hairstyling for a Miniseries or a Special			
1993	Alex Haley's Queen		Linda De Andrea	CBS
1993	Citizen Cohn		Mona Orr	HBO
1993	The Jacksons: An American Dream		Robert L. Stevenson	ABC
1993	Love, Honor & Obey: The Last Mafia Marriage		Leslie Ann Anderson, Karl Wesson	CBS
1993	Sinatra	"Part 1"	Bette Iverson, Adele Taylor	CBS
1993	Outstanding Hairstyling for a Series			
1993	Star Trek: The Next Generation	"Time's Arrow, Part 2"	Joy Zapata, Candace Neal, Patricia Miller, Laura Connolly, Richard Sabre, Julia L. Walker, Josée Normand	Syndicated
1993	Homefront	"Life Is Short"	Jerry Gugliemotto, Georgina Williams	ABC
1993	Murphy Brown	"A Year to Remember"	Judy Crown	CBS
1993	Sisters	"The Cold Light of Day"	Sharleen Rassi, Barry Rosenberg	NBC
1993	Star Trek: Deep Space Nine	"Move Along Home"	Candace Neal, Ronald W. Smith, Gerald Solomon, Susan Zietlow-Maust	Syndicated
1994	Outstanding Hairstyling for a Miniseries or a Special			
1994	Oldest Living Confederate Widow Tells All		Linda De Andrea, Darlene Brumfield, K-Bobby	CBS
1994	Abraham		Elda Magnanti, Mauro Tamagnini, Gianna Viola	TNT
1994	The 66th Annual Academy Awards		Mary Guerrero, Gail Rowell-Ryan	ABC
1994	And the Band Played On		Arturo Rojas, Martin Christopher	HBO
1994	Frankenstein		Tricia Cameron	TNT
1994	Gypsy		Carol Meikle, Hazel Catmull, Gloria Montemayor	CBS
1994	Outstanding Hairstyling for a Series			
1994	Dr. Quinn, Medicine Woman	"Where the Heart Is"	Laura Lee Grubich, Cheri Hufman, Shirley Dolle, Virginia Grobeson, Barbara Minster, Rebecca De Morrio	CBS
1994	Star Trek: Deep Space Nine	"Armageddon Game"	Josée Normand, Ronald W. Smith, Norma Lee, Gerald Solomon	Syndicated
1994	Star Trek: The Next Generation	"Firstborn"	Joy Zapata, Patricia Miller, Laura Connolly, Carolyn Elias, Don Sheldon, Susan Zietlow-Maust	Syndicated
1994	The Young Indiana Jones Chronicles	"Paris, May 1919"	Meinir Jones-Lewis	ABC
1995	Outstanding Hairstyling for a Miniseries or a Special			
1995	Scarlett		Linda De Andrea, Tricia Cameron	CBS
1995	Big Dreams and Broken Hearts: The Dottie West Story		James Encao	CBS
1995	Buffalo Girls		Dorothy D. Fox, Lynda Gurasich, Michael Kriston	CBS
1995	In Search of Dr. Seuss		Danny Valencia, Erwin H. Kupitz	TNT
1995	Liz: The Elizabeth Taylor Story		Lynn Del Kail, Candida Conery	NBC
1995	Naomi & Wynonna: Love Can Build a Bridge		Linda De Andrea	NBC
1995	Outstanding Hairstyling for a Series			
1995	Dr. Quinn, Medicine Woman	"A Washington Affair"	Karl Wesson, Kelly Kline, Deborah Holmes Dobson, Virginia Grobeson, Leslie Ann Anderson, Laura Connolly, Caryl Codon-Tharp, Carol Pershing	CBS
1995	Babylon 5	"The Geometry of Shadows"	Tracy Smith	Syndicated
1995	The Nanny	"Stock Tip"	Dugg Kirkpatrick	CBS
1995	Roseanne	"Skeletons in the Closet"	Pixie Schwartz	ABC
1995	Star Trek: Deep Space Nine	"Improbable Cause"	Josée Normand, Norma Lee, Ronald W. Smith, Gerald Solomon, Michael Moore, Chris McBee, Caryl Codon-Tharp, Faith Vecchio, Rebecca De Morrio, Joan Phillips	Syndicated
1995	Star Trek: Voyager	"Caretaker"	Josée Normand, Patricia Miller, Shawn McKay, Karen Asano-Myers, Dino Ganziano, Rebecca De Morrio, Barbara Minster, Janice D. Brandow, Gloria Ponce, Caryl Codon-Tharp, Katherine Rees, Virginia Kearns, Patricia Vecchio, Faith Vecchio, Audrey Levy	UPN
1996	Outstanding Hairstyling for a Miniseries or a Special			
1996	Gulliver's Travels		Aileen Seaton	NBC
1996	The Best of Tracey Takes On...		Audrey Futterman-Stern, Evelyn Rozenfeld	HBO
1996	Bye Bye Birdie		Roy Sidick, Judy Crown, Geordie Sheffer, Dean Scheck	ABC
1996	The Heidi Chronicles		Cynthia P. Romo	TNT
1996	Norma Jean & Marilyn		Andre Blaise	HBO
1996	Outstanding Hairstyling for a Series			
1996	Dr. Quinn, Medicine Woman	"When a Child Is Born"	Karl Wesson, Kelly Kline, Deborah Holmes Dobson, Laura Lee Grubich, Virginia Grobeson, Christine Lee	CBS
1996	Chicago Hope	"Right to Life"	Mary Ann Valdes, Dione Taylor	CBS
1996	Saturday Night Live	"Host: Quentin Tarantino"	David H. Lawrence, Wanda Gregory, Valerie Gladstone-Appel, Linda Rice	NBC
1996	Star Trek: Deep Space Nine	"Our Man Bashir"	Shirley Dolle, Cherie, Lee Crawford, Brian A. Tunstall, Ellen Powell, Susan Zietlow-Maust, Barbara Ronci	Syndicated
1996	Star Trek: Voyager	"Persistence of Vision"	Barbara Minster, Karen Asano-Myers, Laura Connolly, Suzan Bagdadi	UPN
1996	3rd Rock from the Sun	"The Dicks They Are a Changin'"	Pixie Schwartz	NBC
1997	Outstanding Hairstyling for a Miniseries or a Special			
1997	Mrs. Santa Claus		Gloria Montemayor, Lola 'Skip' McNalley, Dorothy Andre	CBS
1997	Bette Midler in Concert: Diva Las Vegas		Robert Ramos	HBO
1997	Crazy Horse		Joani Yarbrough, JoJo Guthrie, Jeaneen Muckerman	TNT
1997	The Hunchback		Jánosné Kajtár, Monika Hufnagel, Libuse Barlova	TNT
1997	If These Walls Could Talk		Clare M. Corsick, Enzo Angileri, Sally J. Harper, Renate Leuschner, Voni Hinkle, Serena Radaelli, Cammy R. Langer	HBO
1997	The Odyssey		Suzanne Stokes-Munton, Petra Schaumann	NBC
1997	Outstanding Hairstyling for a Series			
1997	Star Trek: Voyager	"Fair Trade"	Josée Normand, Suzan Bagdadi, Karen Asano-Myers, Monique DeSart, Charlotte Parker, Jo Ann Phillips, Frank Fontaine, Diane Pepper	UPN
1997	Dr. Quinn, Medicine Woman	"Starting Over"	Karl Wesson, Kelly Kline, Deborah Holmes Dobson, Virginia Grobeson, Christine Lee, Leslie Ann Anderson	CBS
1997	Star Trek: Deep Space Nine	"Trials and Tribble-ations"	Norma Lee, Brian A. Tunstall, Jacklin Masteran, Linle White, Francine Shermaine, Caryl Codon-Tharp, Susan Zietlow-Maust, Charlotte Harvey	Syndicated
1997	3rd Rock from the Sun	"A Nightmare on Dick Street"	Pixie Schwartz, Camille Friend	NBC
1997	Tracey Takes On...	"Childhood"	Audrey Futterman-Stern	HBO
1998	Outstanding Hairstyling for a Miniseries, Movie or a Special			
1998	From the Earth to the Moon		Vicky Phillips, Lynda Gurasich	HBO
1998	The Day Lincoln Was Shot		Sally J. Harper, Bob Harper	TNT
1998	Don King: Only in America		Leonard Drake, Pauletta O. Lewis, Alan Scott	HBO
1998	Rodgers & Hammerstein's Cinderella		Jennifer Guerrero-Mazursky, Ellin La Var, Carla Farmer, Julia L. Walker, Kimberly Kimble, Lucia Mace	ABC
1998	The Warlord: Battle for the Galaxy		Josée Normand, Norma Lee	UPN
1998	Outstanding Hairstyling for a Series			
1998	Tracey Takes On...	"Smoking"	Audrey Futterman-Stern	HBO
1998	Buffy the Vampire Slayer	"Becoming"	Jeri Baker, Francine Shermaine, Suzan Bagdadi, Susan Carol Schwary, Dugg Kirkpatrick	The WB
1998	Dr. Quinn, Medicine Woman	"A New Beginning"	Deborah Holmes Dobson, Virginia Grobeson, Laura Lee Grubich, Christine Lee, Elaina P. Schulman, Jennifer Guerrero-Mazursky, Kelly Kline	CBS
1998	Star Trek: Deep Space Nine	"Far Beyond the Stars"	Norma Lee, Brian A. Tunstall, Rebecca De Morrio, Darlis Chefalo, Gloria Pasqua Casny, Kathrine Gordon, Hazel Catmull, Ruby Ford, Louisa V. Anthony, Barbara Ronci, Suzan Bagdadi, JoAnn Stafford-Chaney	Syndicated
1998	Star Trek: Voyager	"The Killing Game"	Josée Normand, Charlotte Parker, Viviane Normand, Gloria Montemayor, Chris McBee, Mimi Jafari, Ruby Ford, Delree F. Todd, Laura Connolly, Hazel Catmull, Diane Pepper, Adele Taylor, Barbara Ronci, Lola 'Skip' McNalley	UPN
1999	Outstanding Hairstyling for a Miniseries, Movie or a Special			
1999	Houdini		Judy Crown	TNT
1999	And the Beat Goes On: The Sonny and Cher Story		Tim Jones, Marlene D. Williams	ABC
1999	Cleopatra		Maria Teresa Corridoni, Desideria Corridoni, Barry Richardson	ABC
1999	Joan of Arc		Jan Archibald, Benjamin Robin	CBS
1999	The Rat Pack		Audrey Futterman-Stern, Gail Rowell-Ryan, Kelvin R. Trahan	HBO
1999	Outstanding Hairstyling for a Series			
1999	Tracey Takes On...	"Hair"	Audrey Futterman-Stern	HBO
1999	MADtv	"402"	Matthew Kasten	Fox
1999	Saturday Night Live	"Host: Gwyneth Paltrow"	Bobby H. Grayson	NBC
1999	Star Trek: Deep Space Nine	"Badda-Bing Badda-Bang"	Norma Lee, Brian A. Tunstall, Gloria Pasqua Casny, Rebecca De Morrio, Laura Connolly, Lauran Upshaw, Frank Fontaine, Tim Jones, Susan Zietlow-Maust, Angela Gurule, Gloria Ponce, Virginia Grobeson, Linda Leiter Sharp	Syndicated
1999	That '70s Show	"Prom Night"	Gabriella Pollino, Cindy Costello, Valerie Scott, Deborah Ann Piper	Fox

=== 2000s ===
Year	Program	Episode	Nominees	Network
2000	Outstanding Hairstyling for a Miniseries, Movie or a Special			
2000	Introducing Dorothy Dandridge		Hazel Catmull, Kathrine Gordon, Katherine Rees, Jennifer Bell, Virginia Kearns	HBO
2000	Annie		Matthew Kasten, Mishell Chandler, Natasha Ladek	ABC
2000	Arabian Nights	"Part 2"	Aldo Signoretti, Giorgio Gregorini, Massimiliano Duranti, Marina Marin, Ferdinando Merolla, Alessio Pompei, Nadia Rosati	ABC
2000	Gepetto		Judy Crown, Cheri Ruff, Shirley Dolle, Francine Shermaine, Warren Lewis, Gloria Pasqua Casny, Shannon Soucie	ABC
2000	RKO 281		Roseann Samuel, Elaine Browne, Karen Z.M. Turner, Aileen Seaton, Lesley Noble	HBO
2000	Outstanding Hairstyling for a Series			
2000	Saturday Night Live	"Host: Alan Cumming"	Bobby H. Grayson	NBC
2000	Buffy the Vampire Slayer	"Beer Bad"	Sean Flanigan, Lisa Marie Rosenberg, Gloria Pasqua Casny, Loretta Jody Miller	The WB
2000	MADtv	"Movie Show"	Dugg Kirkpatrick, Judith Tiedemann, Christine Curry, Virginia Grobeson, Danny Goldstein, Bryn E. Leetch, Matthew Kasten, Kenneth Michael Beck	Fox
2000	The Sopranos	"Full Leather Jacket"	Mel McKinney, William A. Kohout	HBO
2000	Star Trek: Voyager	"Dragon's Teeth"	Josée Normand, Charlotte Parker, Gloria Montemayor, Viviane Normand, Jo Ann Phillips	UPN
2000	That '70s Show	"Vanstock"	Gabriella Pollino, Cindy Costello, Valerie Scott	Fox
2001	Outstanding Hairstyling for a Miniseries, Movie or a Special			
2001	Life with Judy Garland: Me and My Shadows		Marie-Ange Ripka, Andrea Tranmueller	ABC
2001	Horatio Hornblower	"Mutiny"	Kevin Alexander	A&E
2001	Jackie Bouvier Kennedy Onassis		Bob Pritchett, Linda De Andrea	CBS
2001	The Last of the Blonde Bombshells		Lisa Westcott, Julie Dartnell, Beverley Binda, Jayne Buxton, Kate Benton	HBO
2001	The Lost Empire		Loulia Sheppard	NBC
2001	61*		William A. Farley, Hazel Catmull, Dino Ganziano	HBO
2001	Outstanding Hairstyling for a Series			
2001	MADtv	"601"	Matthew Kasten, Mishell Chandler, Desmond Miller, Rod Ortega, Mimi Jafari, Fabrizio Sanges	Fox
2001	The Lot	"Daddy Dearest"	Cheri Ruff, Carl Bailey, Stephen Elsbree	AMC
2001	Sex and the City	"All or Nothing"	Michelle Johnson, Jacques Stephane Lempire, Sacha Quarles	HBO
2001	Star Trek: Voyager	"Prophecy"	Josée Normand, Charlotte Parker, Gloria Montemayor	UPN
2001	That '70s Show	"Backstage Pass"	Gabriella Pollino, Cindy Costello, Terrie Velazquez Owen	Fox
2002	Outstanding Hairstyling for a Miniseries or a Movie			
2002	Anne Rice's The Feast of All Saints	"Part 1"	Regan Noble	Showtime
2002	Band of Brothers	"Crossroads"	Helen Smith, Paula Price	HBO
2002	Dinotopia	"Part 1"	Suzanne Stokes-Munton	ABC
2002	James Dean		Carol A. O'Connell	TNT
2002	The Mists of Avalon	"Part 1"	Carol Hemming	TNT
2002	Path to War		Toni-Ann Walker, Joy Zapata, Stephen Robinette, Patricia Budz, Lumas Hamilton Jr., Ora Green	HBO
2002	Outstanding Hairstyling for a Series (Non-Prosthetic)			
2002	Star Trek: Enterprise	"Two Days and Two Nights"	Michael Moore, Gloria Pasqua Casny, Roma Goddard, Laura Connolly, Cheri Ruff	UPN
2002	Alias	"Q&A"	Michael Reitz, Karen Bartek	ABC
2002	Buffy the Vampire Slayer	"Hell's Bells"	Sean Flanigan, Lisa Marie Rosenberg, Francine Shermaine, Thomas Real, Linda Arnold	UPN
2002	Sex and the City	"Ghost Town"	Michelle Johnson, Angel De Angelis, Sacha Quarles, Suzana Neziri	HBO
2002	Six Feet Under	"I'll Take You"	Randy Sayer, Kimberley Spiteri, Pinky Babajian	HBO
2003	Outstanding Hairstyling for a Miniseries or a Movie			
2003	Door to Door		Julie McHaffie	TNT
2003	Cher: The Farewell Tour		Serena Radaelli, Morgane Bernhard	NBC
2003	Frank Herbert's Children of Dune		Paul LeBlanc, Tamara Koubová	Sci Fi
2003	My House in Umbria		Maria Teresa Corridoni, Desideria Corridoni, Gianna Viola, Anna De Santis	HBO
2003	Napoléon		Agathe Dupuis	A&E
2003	Outstanding Hairstyling for a Series			
2003	American Dreams	"I Want to Hold Your Hand"	Cheri Ruff, Soo-Jin Yoon, Paulette Pennington	NBC
2003	Alias	"The Counteragent"	Michael Reitz, Karen Bartek	ABC
2003	MADtv	"805"	Matthew Kasten, Mishell Chandler, K. Troy Zestos, Stacey Bergman	Fox
2003	Sex and the City	"Plus One Is the Loneliest Number"	Wayne Herndon, Mandy Lyons, Suzana Neziri, Donna Marie Fischetto	HBO
2003	Six Feet Under	"Perfect Circles"	Randy Sayer, Dennis Parker, Pinky Babajian	HBO
2004	Outstanding Hairstyling for a Miniseries or a Movie			
2004	The Reagans		Linda Bourgon, Marie-Ange Ripka	Showtime
2004	Angels in America		David Brian Brown, Jasen Joseph Sica, Angel De Angelis	HBO
2004	Dreamkeeper		Réjean Forget, Don Olson	ABC
2004	Ike: Countdown to D-Day		Paul Pattison, Kimberley Spiteri	A&E
2004	The Lion in Winter		Martial Corneville, Silke Lisku, Klári Szinek	Showtime
2004	Tracey Ullman in the Trailer Tales		Cydney Cornell, Charlotte Parker	HBO
2004	Outstanding Hairstyling for a Series (Non-Prosthetic)			
2004	Carnivàle	"After the Ball Is Over"	Kerry Mendenhall, Louisa V. Anthony, Elizabeth Rabe	HBO
2004	Alias	"Unveiled"	Michael Reitz, Karen Bartek, Grace Hernandez, Julie M. Woods	ABC
2004	Deadwood	"Plague"	Josée Normand, Peter Tothpal, Susan Carol Schwary, Ellen Powell	HBO
2004	MADtv	"MADtv's 200th Episode"	Matthew Kasten, Mishell Chandler, Anthea Grutsis, Desmond Miller	Fox
2004	Saturday Night Live	"Hosts: Jessica Simpson & Nick Lachey"	Clariss Morgan, Michaelanthony, Linda Rice	NBC
2005	Outstanding Hairstyling for a Miniseries or a Movie			
2005	The Life and Death of Peter Sellers		Veronica McAleer, Enzo Angileri, Ashley Johnson	HBO
2005	Lackawanna Blues		Charles Gregory Ross, Fay Kelly	HBO
2005	Their Eyes Were Watching God		Alan D'Angerio, Barbara Lorenz	ABC
2005	Tracey Ullman: Live and Exposed		Audrey Futterman-Stern	HBO
2005	Warm Springs		Taylor Knight, Vanessa Davis	HBO
2005	Outstanding Hairstyling for a Series			
2005	Deadwood	"Boy the Earth Talks To"	Carol Pershing, Terry Baliel, Kimberley Spiteri	HBO
2005	Alias	"Nocturne"	Michael Reitz	ABC
2005	American Dreams	"Starting Over"	Mary Ann Valdes, Norma Lee, Paulette Pennington, Cathrine A. Marcotte	NBC
2005	Carnivàle	"Outside New Canaan"	Norma Lee, Nanci Cascio, Violet Ortiz	HBO
2005	MADtv	"1017"	Matthew Kasten, Anthea Grutsis, Desmond Miller, Raissa Patton	Fox
2005	Star Trek: Enterprise	"In a Mirror, Darkly"	Norma Lee, Nanci Cascio, Violet Ortiz	UPN
2006	Outstanding Hairstyling for a Miniseries or a Movie			
2006	Elizabeth I	"Part 2"	Fae Hammond, Sue Westwood	HBO
2006	Into the West	"Casualties of War"	Mary Hedges Lampert, Jennifer Santiago	TNT
2006	Into the West	"Manifest Destiny"	Iloe Flewelling	TNT
2006	Mrs. Harris		Bunny Parker, Susan Schuler-Page, Elle Elliott	HBO
2006	Outstanding Hairstyling for a Series			
2006	Rome	"Stealing from Saturn"	Aldo Signoretti, Ferdinando Merolla, Stefano Ceccarelli, Gaetano Panico	HBO
2006	Alias	"There's Only One Sydney Bristow"	Michael Reitz, Katherine Rees, Shimmy Osman	ABC
2006	Desperate Housewives	"Remember"	Gabor Heiligenberg, Dena Green, James Dunham, Nicole DeFrancesco	ABC
2006	Six Feet Under	"Everyone's Waiting"	Randy Sayer, Miia Kovero, Karl Wesson, Daphne Lawson	HBO
2006	Will & Grace	"The Finale"	Luke O'Connor, Tim Burke	NBC
2007	Outstanding Hairstyling for a Miniseries or a Movie			
2007	Jane Eyre		Anne Oldham, Nicola Mansell, Faye De Bremaeker	PBS
2007	The 79th Annual Academy Awards		Maria Valdivia, Anthony Wilson, Cynthia P. Romo	ABC
2007	Broken Trail		Penny Thompson	AMC
2007	Bury My Heart at Wounded Knee		Iloe Flewelling, Chris Harrison-Glimsdale, Heather L. Ingram, Penny Thompson	HBO
2007	Outstanding Hairstyling for a Series			
2007	Rome	"De Patre Vostro (About Your Father)"	Aldo Signoretti, Stefano Ceccarelli, Claudia Catini, Michele Vigliotta	HBO
2007	Dancing with the Stars	"303"	Mary Guerrero, Lucia Mace, Cynthia P. Romo	ABC
2007	Deadwood	"A Constant Throb"	Gabor Heiligenberg, Dena Green, James Dunham, Maria Fernandez DiSarro	HBO
2007	Desperate Housewives	"It Takes Two"	Gabor Heiligenberg, Dena Green, James Dunham, Maria Fernandez DiSarro	ABC
2007	Ugly Betty	"I'm Coming Out"	Mary Ann Valdes, Lynda Kyle Walker, Norma Lee	ABC
2008	Outstanding Hairstyling for a Miniseries or a Movie			
2008	Cranford		Alison Elliott	PBS
2008	Bernard and Doris		Robin Day, Milton Buras	HBO
2008	John Adams		Jan Archibald, Loulia Sheppard	HBO
2008	Tin Man		Anji Bemben, Linda Jones	Sci Fi
2008	Outstanding Hairstyling for a Single-Camera Series			
2008	Mad Men	"Shoot"	Gloria Ponce, Katherine Rees, Marilyn Phillips, Michele Payne	AMC
2008	Desperate Housewives	"In Buddy's Eyes"	Gabor Heiligenberg, Dena Green, James Dunham, Maria Fernandez DiSarro	ABC
2008	Dirty Sexy Money	"The Bridge"	Dennis Parker, Polly Lucke, Kay Majerus, Anna Maria Orzano	ABC
2008	Pushing Daisies	"Smell of Success"	Daniel Curet, Yuko T. Koach	ABC
2008	Tracey Ullman's State of the Union	"104"	Martin Samuel	Showtime
2008	Ugly Betty	"A Nice Day for a Posh Wedding"	Mary Ann Valdes, Lynda Kyle Walker, Norma Lee, Kim Messina	ABC
2009	Outstanding Hairstyling for a Miniseries or a Movie			
2009	Grey Gardens		Jenny Arbour, Nancy E. Warren	HBO
2009	Gifted Hands: The Ben Carson Story		Julia L. Walker, Deena Adair, Clifton Chippewa	TNT
2009	House of Saddam		Marella Shearer, Juliette Tomes	HBO
2009	Into the Storm		Kerin Parfitt, Stefano Ceccarelli	HBO
2009	Little Dorrit		Karen Hartley Thomas	PBS
2009	Outstanding Hairstyling for a Single-Camera Series			
2009	Mad Men	"The Gold Violin"	Gloria Ponce, Katherine Rees, Marilyn Phillips, Michele Payne	AMC
2009	Desperate Housewives	"The Best Thing That Ever Could Have Happened"	Gabor Heiligenberg, Dena Green, James Dunham, Maria Fernandez DiSarro	ABC
2009	Pushing Daisies	"Dim Sum Lose Some"	Daniel Curet, Yuko T. Koach, Gloria Conrad, Elizabeth Rabe	ABC
2009	Tracey Ullman's State of the Union	"202"	Martin Samuel, Colleen LaBaff	Showtime
2009	The Tudors	"Protestant Anne of Cleves"	Dee Corcoran	Showtime

=== 2010s ===
Year	Program	Episode	Nominees	Network
2010	Outstanding Hairstyling for a Miniseries or a Movie			
2010	Emma		Anne Oldham	PBS
2010	Georgia O'Keeffe		Enid Arias, Geordie Sheffer	Lifetime
2010	Return to Cranford		Karen Hartley Thomas	PBS
2010	Temple Grandin		Geordie Sheffer, Charles Yusko	HBO
2010	You Don't Know Jack		Colleen Callaghan, Joseph Whitmeyer, Cydney Cornell	HBO
2010	Outstanding Hairstyling for a Single-Camera Series			
2010	Mad Men	"Souvenir"	Lucia Mace, Anthony Wilson, Mary Guerrero, Peggy Semtob	AMC
2010	Castle	"Vampire Weekend"	Toni-Ann Walker, Yuko T. Koach, Lillie S. Frierson	ABC
2010	Glee	"Hairography"	Lynda Kyle Walker, Ann Marie Luddy, Michael S. Ward, Gina Bonacquisti	Fox
2010	Glee	"The Power of Madonna"	Stacey K. Black, Mary Gail Stultz, Roxanne N. Sutphen, Gina Bonacquisti	Fox
2010	Tracey Ullman's State of the Union	"301"	Martin Samuel, Colleen LaBaff	Showtime
2010	The Tudors	"Sixth and the Final Wife"	Dee Corcoran	Showtime
2011	Outstanding Hairstyling for a Miniseries or a Movie			
2011	The Kennedys		Jenny Arbour, Judi Cooper-Sealy	Reelz
2011	Cinema Verite		Terry Baliel, Carol Pershing, Beth Miller	HBO
2011	Mildred Pierce		Jerry DeCarlo, Jerry Popolis	HBO
2011	The Pillars of the Earth		Tricia Cameron, Loulia Sheppard	Starz
2011	Outstanding Hairstyling for a Single-Camera Series			
2011	Mad Men	"Christmas Comes But Once a Year"	Sean Flanigan, Gloria Pasqua Casny, Lucia Mace, Theraesa Rivers, Jules Holdren	AMC
2011	Boardwalk Empire	"Boardwalk Empire"	Michael Kriston, Jerry DeCarlo	HBO
2011	Game of Thrones	"A Golden Crown"	Kevin Alexander, Candice Banks, Rosalia Culora, Gary Machin	HBO
2011	Glee	"The Sue Sylvester Shuffle"	Janis Clark, Sterfon Demings, Monte Haught, Susan Zietlow-Maust, Stacey K. Black	Fox
2011	Mad Men	"Hands and Knees"	Lucia Mace, Theraesa Rivers, Terrie Velazquez Owen	AMC
2012	Outstanding Hairstyling for a Miniseries or a Movie			
2012	American Horror Story		Monte Haught, Samantha Wade, Melanie Verkins, Natalie Driscoll, Michelle Ceglia	FX
2012	Hatfields & McCoys		Giorgio Gregorini, Peter Nicastro, Gabriele Gregorini	History
2012	Hemingway & Gellhorn		Yvette Rivas, Frances Mathias	HBO
2012	Outstanding Hairstyling for a Single-Camera Series			
2012	Downton Abbey	"Episode 1"	Anne Oldham, Christine Greenwood	PBS
2012	Boardwalk Empire	"Two Boats and a Lifeguard"	Francesca Paris, Christine Cantrell	HBO
2012	The Borgias	"The Confession"	Stefano Ceccarelli, Tahira Herold, Claudia Catini, Sevlene Roddy	Showtime
2012	Game of Thrones	"The Old Gods and the New"	Kevin Alexander, Candice Banks, Rosalia Culora, Gary Machin	HBO
2012	Mad Men	"The Phantom"	Theraesa Rivers, Lucia Mace, Arturo Rojas, Maria Sandoval, David Blair	AMC
2013	Outstanding Hairstyling for a Miniseries or a Movie			
2013	Behind the Candelabra		Marie Larkin, Yvette Stone, Kerrie Smith, Kay Georgiou	HBO
2013	American Horror Story: Asylum		Monte Haught, Natalie Driscoll, Janis Clark, Michelle Ceglia, Stacey K. Black	FX
2013	Liz & Dick		Beatrice De Alba, Lee Ann Brittenham, Richard De Alba	Lifetime
2013	Phil Spector		Stanley Hall, Cydney Cornell, Michael Kriston	HBO
2013	Political Animals		Mary Ann Valdes, Nancy Stimac, Qodi Armstrong	USA
2013	Ring of Fire		Susan Jennifer Lipson, Deena Adair, Darrell Redleaf-Fielder	Lifetime
2013	Outstanding Hairstyling for a Single-Camera Series			
2013	Boardwalk Empire	"Resolution"	Francesca Paris, Lisa DelleChiaie, Sarah Stamp	HBO
2013	The Borgias	"The Wolf and the Lamb"	Stefano Ceccarelli, Claudia Catini, Sevlene Roddy, Judit Halász	Showtime
2013	Downton Abbey	"Episode 4"	Magi Vaughan, Vanya Pell	PBS
2013	Game of Thrones	"Second Sons"	Kevin Alexander, Candice Banks, Rosalia Culora, Gary Machin, Dana Kalder	HBO
2013	Mad Men	"The Doorway"	Theraesa Rivers, Arturo Rojas, David Blair, Jules Holdren	AMC
2014	Outstanding Hairstyling for a Miniseries or a Movie			
2014	American Horror Story: Coven		Monte Haught, Michelle Ceglia, Yolanda Mercadel, Daina Daigle	FX
2014	Bonnie & Clyde		Audrey L. Anzures, Catherine Childers	Lifetime
2014	Mob City	"A Guy Walks Into a Bar"	Nina Paskowitz, Michael Moore, Elizabeth Cortez, Jennifer Singleton, Mary Howd	TNT
2014	The Normal Heart		David DeLeon, Todd McIntosh, Amber Crowe	HBO
2014	The White Queen	"Long Live the King"	Karen Dawson, Kate Starr, Julie Kendrick, Louise Coles	Starz
2014	Outstanding Hairstyling for a Single-Camera Series			
2014	Downton Abbey	"Episode 8"	Magi Vaughan, Adam James Phillips	PBS
2014	Boardwalk Empire	"William Wilson"	Francesca Paris, Lisa DelleChiaie, Therese Ducey	HBO
2014	Game of Thrones	"The Lion and the Rose"	Kevin Alexander, Candice Banks, Rosalia Culora, Gary Machin, Nicola Mount	HBO
2014	Mad Men	"The Runaways"	Theraesa Rivers, Arturo Rojas, Valerie Jackson, Ai Nakata	AMC
2014	The Originals	"Dance Back from the Grave"	Colleen LaBaff, Kimberley Spiteri	The CW
2015	Outstanding Hairstyling for a Limited Series or Movie			
2015	American Horror Story: Freak Show		Monte Haught, Michelle Ceglia, Daina Daigle, Amy Wood, Sherri B. Hamilton	FX
2015	Bessie		Lawrence Davis, Monty Schuth, Iasia Merriweather, Victor Jones	HBO
2015	Grace of Monaco		Agathe Dupuis, Silvine Picard	Lifetime
2015	Olive Kitteridge		Cydney Cornell	HBO
2015	The Secret Life of Marilyn Monroe		Cliona Furey, Cathy Shibley, Jacqueline Robertson Cull, Vincent Sullivan	Lifetime
2015	Outstanding Hairstyling for a Single-Camera Series			
2015	Downton Abbey	"Episode 6"	Nic Collins	HBO
2015	Boardwalk Empire	"Eldorado"	Francesca Paris, Lisa DelleChiaie, Sarah Stamp	HBO
2015	Game of Thrones	"Mother's Mercy"	Kevin Alexander, Candice Banks, Rosalia Culora, Gary Machin, Laura Pollock, Nicola Mount	HBO
2015	The Knick	"Get the Rope"	Jerry DeCarlo, Rose Chatterton, Suzy Mazzarese-Allison, Victor DeNicola, Christine Cantrell	Cinemax
2015	Mad Men	"Person to Person"	Theraesa Rivers, Arturo Rojas, Valerie Jackson, Ai Nakata	AMC
2016	Outstanding Hairstyling for a Limited Series or Movie			
2016	The People v. O. J. Simpson: American Crime Story		Chris Clark, Natalie Driscoll, Shay Sanford-Fong, Katrina Chevalier	FX
2016	All the Way		Anne Morgan, Terrie Velazquez-Owen, Brian Andrew-Tunstall, Julia Holdren, Barry Rosenberg, Quan Pierce	HBO
2016	American Horror Story: Hotel		Monte C. Haught, Fredric Aspiras, Darlene Brumfield, Kelly Muldoon, Gina Bonacquisti	FX
2016	Fargo		Chris Glimsdale, Judy Durbacz, Penny Thompson, Cindy Ferguson, Tracy Murray	FX
2016	Roots	"Part One"	Tony Ward, Adam Gaeta, Talli Pachter, Sherri B. Hamilton	History
2016	Outstanding Hairstyling for a Single-Camera Series			
2016	Downton Abbey	"Episode 9"	Nic Collins, Adele Firth	PBS
2016	Game of Thrones	"The Door"	Kevin Alexander, Candice Banks, Nicola Mount, Laura Pollock, Gary Machin, Rosalia Culora	HBO
2016	The Knick	"Williams and Walker"	Jerry DeCarlo, John 'Jack' Curtin, Nathan Busch, Karen Dickenson, Suzy Mazzarese Allison	Cinemax
2016	Masters of Sex	"Matters of Gravity"	Mary Ann Valdes, Matthew Holman, George Guzman	Showtime
2016	Penny Dreadful	"Glorious Horrors"	Ferdinando Merolla, Sevlene Roddy, Giuliano Mariano, Orla Carroll	Showtime
2017	Outstanding Hairstyling for a Limited Series or Movie			
2017	Feud: Bette and Joan		Chris Clark, Ralph Michael Abalos, Wendy Southard, Helena Cepeda	FX
2017	American Horror Story: Roanoke		Michelle Ceglia, Valerie Jackson, Jose Zamora	FX
2017	Big Little Lies		Michelle Ceglia, Nickole C. Jones, Lona Vigi, Frances Mathias, Jocelyn Mulhern	HBO
2017	Fargo		Chris Glimsdale, Penny Thompson, Judy Durbacz, Eva Blanchard	FX
2017	Genius	"Einstein: Chapter One"	Tash Lees, Fae Hammond, Adela Robova, Alex Rouse	Nat Geo
2017	Outstanding Hairstyling for a Single-Camera Series			
2017	Westworld	"Contrapasso"	Joy Zapata, Pavy Olivarez, Bruce Samia, Donna Anderson	HBO
2017	The Crown	"Hyde Park Corner"	Ivana Primorac, Amy Riley	Netflix
2017	Penny Dreadful	"Ebb Tide"	Ferdinando Merolla, Sevlene Roddy, Giuliano Mariano, Orla Carroll	Showtime
2017	Stranger Things	"Chapter Two: The Weirdo on Maple Street"	Sarah Hindsgaul, Evelyn Roach	Netflix
2017	Vikings	"Revenge"	Dee Corcoran, Catherine Argue, Jenny Readman, Ida Erickson, Zuelika Delaney	History
2018	Outstanding Hairstyling for a Limited Series or Movie			
2018	The Assassination of Gianni Versace: American Crime Story		Chris Clark, Natalie Driscoll, Shay Sanford-Fong, Helena Cepeda	FX
2018	American Horror Story: Cult		Michelle Ceglia, Samantha Wade, Brittany Madrigal, Julie Rael, Valerie Jackson, Joanne Onorio	FX
2018	Genius: Picasso		Kate Starr, Alex Rouse, Judit Halasz, Janosne Kajtar	Nat Geo
2018	Godless		Geordie Sheffer, Megan Daum, Carmen Jones	Netflix
2018	The Last Tycoon	"Oscar, Oscar, Oscar"	Theraesa Rivers, Valerie Jackson, Mishell Chandler, Amanda Mofield, Deborah Pierce, Loretta Nero	Amazon Prime Video
2018	Twin Peaks		Clare M. Corsick, Bryn Leetch	Showtime
2018	Outstanding Hairstyling for a Single-Camera Series			
2018	Westworld	"Akane No Mai"	Joy Zapata, Lori McCoy-Bell, Dawn Victoria Dudley, Karen Zanki, Connie Kallos, Norma Lee	HBO
2018	The Crown	"Dear Mrs. Kennedy"	Ivana Primorac	Netflix
2018	Game of Thrones	"The Dragon and the Wolf"	Kevin Alexander, Candice Banks, Nicola Mount, Rosalia Culora	HBO
2018	GLOW	"Pilot"	Theraesa Rivers, Valerie Jackson, Leslie Bennett, Jules Holdren	Netflix
2018	The Marvelous Mrs. Maisel	"Pilot"	Francesca Paris, Christine Cantrell, Cassie Hurd, Reo Anderson	Amazon Prime Video
2019	Outstanding Hairstyling for a Limited Series or Movie			
2019	Fosse/Verdon		Christopher Fulton, Christen Edwards, Nicole Bridgeford, Christine Cantrell, Charlene Belmond	FX
2019	Chernobyl		Julio Parodi, Jovana Jovanavic	HBO
2019	Deadwood: The Movie		Melissa Yonkey, Laine Trzinski, Jose Zamora	HBO
2019	Sharp Objects	"Closer"	Jose Zamora, Michelle Ceglia, Jocelyn Mulhern, Patti Dehaney, Melissa Yonkey, Stacey K. Black	HBO
2019	True Detective		Brian B. Badie, Andrea Mona Bowman, Lawrence Cornell Davis	HBO
2019	Outstanding Hairstyling for a Single-Camera Series			
2019	The Marvelous Mrs. Maisel	"We're Going to the Catskills!"	Jerry DeCarlo, Jon Jordan, Peg Schierholz, Christine Cantrell, Sabana Majeed	Amazon
2019	American Horror Story: Apocalypse	"Forbidden Fruit"	Michelle Ceglia, Helena Cepeda, Lydia Fantani, Romaine Markus-Meyers	FX
2019	Game of Thrones	"The Long Night"	Kevin Alexander, Candice Banks, Nicola Mount, Rosalia Culora	HBO
2019	GLOW	"The Good Twin"	Theraesa Rivers, Valerie Jackson, Mishell Chandler, Deborah Pierce, Loretta Nero, Jason Green	Netflix
2019	Pose	"Pilot"	Chris Clark, Barry Lee Moe, Jameson Eaton, Mia Neal, Tim Harvey, Sabana Majeed	FX

=== 2020s ===
Year	Program	Episode	Nominees	Network
2020	Outstanding Contemporary Hairstyling			
2020	Black-ish	"Hair Day"	Araxi Lindsey, Robert C. Mathews III, Enoch Williams	ABC
2020	Grace and Frankie	"The Laughing Stock"	Kelly Kline, Jonathan Hanousek, Marlene Williams	Netflix
2020	The Handmaid's Tale	"Liars"	Paul Elliot, Ewa Latak-Cynk	Hulu
2020	The Politician	"Pilot"	Chris Clark, Natalie Driscoll, Havana Prats	Netflix
2020	Schitt's Creek	"Happy Ending"	Annastasia Cucullo, Ana Sorys	Pop TV
2020	This Is Us	"Strangers, Part 2"	Michael Peter Reitz, Katherine Rees, Germicka Barclay, Renia Green-Edittorio, Corey Hill	NBC
2020	Outstanding Period and/or Character Hairstyling			
2020	Hollywood	"A Hollywood Ending"	Michelle Ceglia, Barry Lee Moe, George Guzman, Michele Arvizo, Maria Elena Pantoja	Netflix
2020	The Crown	"Cri de Coeur"	Cate Hall, Louise Coles, Sarah Nuth, Suzanne David, Emilie Yong, Catriona Johnstone	Netflix
2020	The Marvelous Mrs. Maisel	"A Jewish Girl Walks Into the Apollo..."	Kimberley Spiteri, Michael S. Ward, Tijen Osman	Prime Video
2020	Pose	"Worth It"	Barry Lee Moe, Timothy Harvey, Sabana Majeed, Liliana Meyrick, Lisa Thomas, Greg Bazemore, Jessie Mojica, Charlene Belmond	FX
2020	Star Trek: Picard	"Stardust City Rag"	Maxine Morris, Maria Sandoval, Wendy Southard, Sallie Nicole Ciganovich, Ashleigh Childers, Yesim Osman	CBS All Access
2021	Outstanding Contemporary Hairstyling			
2021	Pose	"Series Finale"	Barry Lee Moe, Timothy Harvey, Greg Bazemore, Tene Wilder, Lisa Thomas, Rob Harmon	FX
2021	Black-ish	"Our Wedding Dre"	Nena Ross Davis, Stacey Morris, Ka'Maura Eley, Enoch Williams IV, Robert C. Mathews III, Marcia Hamilton	ABC
2021	The Handmaid's Tale	"Vows"	Paul Elliot, Franchi Pir	Hulu
2021	Mare of Easttown	"Sore Must Be the Storm"	Shunika Terry, Lawrence Davis, Lydia Benaim, Ivana Primorac	HBO
2021	The Politician	"What's in the Box?"	Liliana Maggio, Timothy Harvey, Lisa Thomas, Josh First, Matthew Wilson	Netflix
2021	Outstanding Period and/or Character Hairstyling			
2021	Bridgerton	"Art of the Swoon"	Marc Pilcher, Lynda J. Pearce, Claire Matthews, Adam James Phillips, Tania Couper, Lou Bannell	Netflix
2021	The Crown	"War"	Cate Hall, Emilie Yong Mills, Sam Smart, Suzanne David, Debbie Ormrod, Stacey Louise Holman	Netflix
2021	The Mandalorian	"Chapter 16: The Rescue"	Maria Sandoval, Ashleigh Childers, Wendy Southard	Disney+
2021	Ratched	"The Dance"	Chris Clark, Natalie Driscoll, Dawn Victoria Dudley, Michelle Ceglia, George Guzman, Helena Cepeda	Netflix
2021	WandaVision	"Don't Touch That Dial"	Karen Bartek, Cindy Welles, Nikki Wright, Anna Quinn, Yvonne Kupka	Disney+
2022	Outstanding Contemporary Hairstyling			
2022	Impeachment: American Crime Story	"The Assassination of Monica Lewinsky"	Natalie Driscoll, Nanxy Tong-Heater, Michelle Ceglia, Suzy Mazzarese, Lauren Kress, Leighann Pitchon	FX
2022	American Horror Stories	"Game Over"	Valerie Jackson, Lauren Poole, Roma Goddard, Allison Keck	FX
2022	Black-ish	"That's What Friends Are For"	Nena Ross Davis, Debra Brown, Stacey Morris, Shirlena Allen, Dominique Evans, Lionel Brown	ABC
2022	Euphoria	"The Theater and Its Double"	Kimberly Kimble, Kendra Garvey, Patricia Vecchio, Teresita Mariscal	HBO
2022	Hacks	"The Captain's Wife"	Jennifer Bell	HBO Max
2022	Ted Lasso	"No Weddings and a Funeral"	Nicky Austin, Nicola Springall	Apple TV+
2022	Outstanding Period and/or Character Hairstyling			
2022	Bridgerton	"The Viscount Who Loved Me"	Erika Okvis, Jenny Rhodes-McLean, Sim Camps	Netflix
2022	The First Lady	"See Saw"	Colleen LaBaff, Louisa Anthony, Lawrence Davis, Julie Kendrick, Robert Wilson, Jamika Wilson, Evelyn Roach, Jaime Leigh McIntosh	Showtime
2022	The Marvelous Mrs. Maisel	"How Do You Get to Carnegie Hall?"	Kimberley Spiteri, Barbara Dally, Daniel Koye	Prime Video
2022	Pam & Tommy	"Jane Fonda"	Barry Lee Moe, Erica Adams, George Guzman, Helena Cepeda	Hulu
2022	Stranger Things	"Chapter Seven: The Massacre at Hawkins Lab"	Sarah Hindsgaul, Katrina Suhre, Brynn Berg, Dena Gibson, Jamie Freeman, Tariq Furgerson, Chase Heard, Charles Grico	Netflix
2023	Outstanding Contemporary Hairstyling			
2023	The White Lotus	"Abductions"	Miia Kovero, Elena Gregorini, Italo Di Pinto	HBO
2023	Abbott Elementary	"Festival"	Moira Frazier, Dustin Osborne, Christina Joseph	ABC
2023	Emily in Paris	"Coo D'état"	Carole Nicolas, Mike Désir, Frédéric Souquet, Miharu Oshima, Jessie Durimel, Julien Parizet	Netflix
2023	The Last of Us	"Long, Long Time"	Chris Glimsdale, Penny Thompson, Courtney Ullrich	HBO
2023	Only Murders in the Building	"I Know Who Did It"	Betsy Reyes, Tonia Ciccone, Fabian Garcia, Kerrie Smith	Hulu
2023	P-Valley	"Snow"	Arlene Martin, Latoya Kelley Howard, Kasi York, LeVura Geuka, Jason Yancey	Starz
2023	Ted Lasso	"So Long, Farewell"	Nicky Austin, Nikki Springall, Sophie Roberts, Nicola Pope	Apple TV+
2023	Outstanding Period and/or Character Hairstyling			
2023	Queen Charlotte: A Bridgerton Story	"Crown Jewels"	Nic Collins, Giorgio Galliero	Netflix
2023	The Crown	"Mou Mou"	Cate Hall, Emilie Yong Mills	Netflix
2023	Dahmer – Monster: The Jeffrey Dahmer Story	"Lionel"	Shay Sanford-Fong, Maggie Hayes Jackson, Michael S. Ward, Havanna Pratt	Netflix
2023	The Mandalorian	"Chapter 19: The Convert"	Maria Sandoval, Ashleigh Childers, Sallie Ciganovich	Disney+
2023	The Marvelous Mrs. Maisel	"A House Full of Extremely Lame Horses"	Kimberley Spiteri, Keleen Snowgren, Diana Sikes, Valerie Gladstone, Emily Rosko, Matthew Armentrout	Prime Video
2024	Outstanding Contemporary Hairstyling			
2024	The Morning Show	"The Kármán Line"	Nicole Venables, Jennifer Petrovich, Janine Thompson, Lona Vigi	Apple TV+
2024	Abbott Elementary	"Mother's Day"	Moira Frazier, Dustin Osborne, Christina Joseph	ABC
2024	The Bear	"Fishes"	Ally Vickers, Angela Brasington, Melanie Shaw	FX
2024	Hacks	"Yes, And"	Jennifer Bell	Max
2024	Only Murders in the Building	"Opening Night"	Jameson Eaton, Jimmy Goode, Leah Loukas, J. Roy Helland	Hulu
2024	Outstanding Period or Fantasy/Sci-Fi Hairstyling			
2024	Shōgun	"A Stick of Time"	Sanna Kaarina Seppanen, Mariah Crawley, Madison Gillespie, Nakry Keo, Janis Bekkering	FX
2024	Ahsoka	"Part One: Master and Apprentice"	Maria Sandoval, Ashleigh Childers, Sallie Ciganovich, Marc Mapile, Alyn Topper	Disney+
2024	Feud: Capote vs. The Swans	"Hats, Gloves and Effete Homosexuals"	Sean Flanigan, Chris Clark, Joshua Gericke, Kevin Maybee	FX
2024	The Gilded Age	"You Don't Even Like Opera"	Sean Flanigan, Christine Fennell-Harlan, Jonathan Zane-Sharpless, Aaron Mark Kinchen, Tim Harvey, Jennifer M. Bullock	HBO
2024	Palm Royale	"Maxine Rolls the Dice"	Karen Bartek, Brittany Madrigal, Cyndra Dunn, Tiffany Bloom, Fríða Aradóttir, Jill Crosby	Apple TV+
2025	Outstanding Contemporary Hairstyling			
2025	The Penguin	"Cent'Anni"	Brian Badie, Jenn Vasilopoulos, Mariko Miyagi	HBO
2025	Abbott Elementary	"100th Day of School"	Moira Frazier, Dustin Osborne, Christina Joseph, Charolette Noon, Natita Stribling	ABC
2025	Emily in Paris	"Back on the Crazy Horse"	Carole Nicolas, Miharu Oshima, Mike Désir, Julien Parizet, Stéphane Delahaye	Netflix
2025	Hacks	"I Love L.A."	Aubrey Marie, Becca Weber, Marva Stokes, Alexis Sade Stafford, Jennifer Bell	HBO Max
2025	The Studio	"CinemaCon"	Vanessa Price, Alexandra Ford, Lauren McKeever	Apple TV+
2025	The White Lotus	"Amor Fati"	Miia Kovero, Derrick Anthony Spruill, Punchaya "Nern" Phorang, Teresa Hinton, Sudjai 'Jaiko' Tangsiripracha	HBO
2025	Outstanding Period or Fantasy/Sci-Fi Hairstyling			
2025	Bridgerton	"Old Friends"	Erika Okvist, Farida Ghwedar, Grace Stella Gorman, Emma Rigby, Hannah Forbes, Laura Sim	Netflix
2025	Anne Rice's Interview with the Vampire	"No Pain"	Francesco Pegoretti, Marica Falso, Elena Fabbiani	AMC
2025	House of the Dragon	"Smallfolk"	Rosalia Culora, Stacey Johnson, Kashiya Hinds, Tania Couper, Sarah Spears, Ella Burton	HBO
2025	Monsters: The Lyle and Erik Menendez Story	"Hang Men"	Karen Bartek, Brittany Madrigal, Elissa Ruminer, Analyn Cruz, Kaity Licina	Netflix
2025	What We Do in the Shadows	"The Finale"	Tamara Harrod, Amanda Nestico, Regan Noble	FX
2026	Outstanding Contemporary Hairstyling			
2026	Margo's Got Money Troubles	"Buddies"	Jaime Leigh McIntosh, Ahou Mofid, Celeste Gonzalez, Kim Santantonio, R'riyana Kilne	Apple TV
2026	All's Fair	"Oh, Jesus!"	Valerie Jackson, Linda Flowers, Sharif Poston, Dimitris Giannetos, Michelle Ceglia	Hulu
2026	Emily in Paris	"Veni, Vidi, Venezia"	Carole Nicolas, Mike Desir, Julien Parizet, Jay Durimel, Miharu Oshima	Netflix
2026	Euphoria	"The Ballad of Paladin"	Kimberly Kimble, Kendra Garvey, Kase Glenn, Marquita Lynch, Stacy Schneiderman	HBO
2026	Hacks	"No New Tricks"	Jennifer Bell	HBO Max
2026	Wednesday	"Woe Me the Money"	Francesco Pegoretti, Sevlene Roddy, Marica Falso, Peter Burke, Nirvana Jalalvand	Netflix
2026	Outstanding Period or Fantasy/Sci-Fi Hairstyling			
2026	Bridgerton	"The Waltz"	Nic Collins, Giorgio Galliero, Jade Clarke, Valentina Nesti, Katharine Scott, Laura Hartney	Netflix
2026	Fallout	"The Strip"	Dennis Bailey, April Schuller, Katy McClintock, George Wilson, Raquel Bianchini, Roma Goddard	Prime Video
2026	The Gilded Age	"My Mind Is Made Up"	Sean Flanigan, Christine Fennell Harlan, Jonathan Zane-Sharpless, Tim Harvey, Aaron M. Kinchen, Anika Seitu	HBO
2026	A Knight of the Seven Kingdoms	"The Morrow"	Pippa Woods, Lucille Harding, Tamara Mae Richards-Bloomfield, Anna Knight, Cat Coogan, Lauren Appleby	HBO
2026	Palm Royale	"Maxine Drinks Martinis Now"	Karen Bartek, Brittany Madrigal, Tiffany Bloom, Anna Quinn, Jill Crosby, Frida Aradottir	Apple TV

== Programs with multiple wins ==
4 awards

- Bridgerton
- Downton Abbey
- Mad Men

3 wins

- American Crime Story
- American Horror Story
- Dr. Quinn, Medicine Woman

2 wins

- Rome
- Tracey Takes On...
- Westworld

== Programs with multiple nominations ==
9 nominations

- Mad Men

8 nominations

- American Horror Story
- Game of Thrones

7 nominations

- Star Trek: Deep Space Nine

6 nominations

- Star Trek: The Next Generation
- Star Trek: Voyager

5 nominations

- Alias
- Boardwalk Empire
- The Crown
- Downton Abbey
- Dr. Quinn, Medicine Woman
- The Marvelous Mrs. Maisel

4 nominations

- Bridgerton
- Deadwood
- Desperate Housewives
- Hacks
- Little House on the Prairie

3 nominations

- Abbott Elementary
- American Crime Story
- Black-ish
- Buffy the Vampire Slayer
- Dynasty
- Emily in Paris
- Glee
- Homefront
- Pose
- Sex and the City
- Six Feet Under
- Tracey Ullman's State of the Union

2 nominations

- American Dreams
- The Borgias
- Carnivàle
- Crime Story
- Euphoria
- Fargo
- Feud
- Genius
- The Gilded Age
- GLOW
- The Handmaid's Tale
- Into the West
- The Knick
- The Mandalorian
- Monster
- Moonlighting
- Only Murders in the Building
- Palm Royale
- Penny Dreadful
- The Politician
- Pushing Daisies
- Rome
- Star Trek: Enterprise
- Stranger Things
- Ted Lasso
- Thirtysomething
- The Tudors
- Ugly Betty
- Westworld
- The White Lotus
- The Young Indiana Jones Chronicles
