= William A. Farley =

American hairstylist (1938–2025)

- Born: June 2, 1938; New York City, U.S.
- Died: September 4, 2025 (aged 87)
- Occupation: Hairstylist

William A. Farley (June 2, 1938 – September 4, 2025) was an American hairstylist. He was nominated for a Primetime Emmy Award in the category Outstanding Hairstyling for his work on the television film 61*. His nomination was shared with Hazel Catmull and Dino Ganziano.

Farley died on September 4, 2025, at the age of 87.
