= Suicide Squad (2016 film) =

2016 American film by David Ayer

- Theatrical release poster
- Directed by: David Ayer
- Written by: David Ayer (Note: The footage shot during the film's principal photography was written by David Ayer but the footage shot during the films reshoots/additional photography (described as being a higher amount than the average for a film) was written by Geoff Johns. Ayer retained sole writing credit for the finished film.)
- Based on: Characters from DC
- Produced by: Charles Roven; Richard Suckle
- Starring: Will Smith; Jared Leto; Margot Robbie; Joel Kinnaman; Viola Davis; Jai Courtney; Jay Hernandez; Adewale Akinnuoye-Agbaje; Ike Barinholtz; Scott Eastwood; Cara Delevingne
- Cinematography: Roman Vasyanov
- Edited by: John Gilroy
- Music by: Steven Price
- Production companies: Warner Bros. Pictures; DC Films; RatPac Entertainment; Atlas Entertainment
- Distributed by: Warner Bros. Pictures
- Release dates: August 1, 2016 (Beacon Theatre); August 5, 2016 (United States)
- Running time: 123 minutes
- Country: United States
- Language: English
- Budget: $175 million
- Box office: $749.2 million

Suicide Squad is a 2016 American superhero film based on the DC Comics anti-hero team the Suicide Squad. It is the third installment in the DC Extended Universe (DCEU). Written and directed by David Ayer, it stars an ensemble cast including Will Smith, Jared Leto, Margot Robbie, Joel Kinnaman, Viola Davis, Jai Courtney, Jay Hernandez, Adewale Akinnuoye-Agbaje, Ike Barinholtz, Scott Eastwood, and Cara Delevingne. In the film, a secret government agency led by Amanda Waller recruits imprisoned supervillains to execute dangerous black ops missions and save the world from a powerful threat in exchange for reduced sentences.

By February 2009, a Suicide Squad film was in development at Warner Bros. Ayer signed on to write and direct in September 2014, and by October the casting process had begun. Principal photography began in Toronto on April 13, 2015, with additional filming in Chicago, and ended in August that year.

Suicide Squad premiered in New York City on August 1, 2016, and was released in the United States on August 5 by Warner Bros. Pictures. It was a box office success, grossing $749 million on a budget of $175 million, becoming the tenth-highest-grossing film of 2016, but received mostly negative reviews from critics. Ayer himself disowned the film after its release, claiming that extensive studio interference had ruined his vision. It won an Academy Award for Best Makeup and Hairstyling at the 89th Academy Awards, making it the only DCEU film to have won an Academy Award, and received numerous other accolades. It was followed by a spin-off film, Birds of Prey (2020), and a sequel, The Suicide Squad (2021).

== Plot ==
In the aftermath of Superman's death, (Note: As depicted in Batman v Superman: Dawn of Justice (2016)) intelligence officer Amanda Waller convinces the U.S. government to greenlight Task Force X, a response team of criminals and supervillains. The team will be used to combat metahuman threats, under Waller's control via nanite bombs implanted in each criminal's neck, which can be remotely detonated if they try to rebel or escape. If successful, they will have their sentences shortened.

Dr. June Moone, an American archaeologist, becomes possessed by a witch called Enchantress. Waller can control Enchantress by seizing her magical heart, which wounds her if it is struck. Waller's subordinate Colonel Rick Flag Jr. is in love with Moone, and is made a lead member of Task Force X. However, Enchantress betrays Waller, conquering Midway City, transforming humans into monsters, and summoning her brother Incubus to destroy mankind.

Task Force X is formed to stop Enchantress, using six inmates from Belle Reve penitentiary. The roster consists of hitman Deadshot, who wants to reunite with his daughter Zoe; Harley Quinn, a volatile and crazed former psychiatrist-turned-girlfriend of Gotham crime lord the Joker; Australian boomerang-wielding thief Captain Boomerang; pyrokinetic ex-gangster El Diablo; mutant cannibal Killer Croc; and rope-climber mercenary Slipknot. The team is led by Flag and joined by his associate Katana, a Japanese swordswoman. Waller and Flag deliberately hide the latter's relationship with Moone from the team.

Upon arrival in Midway City, the team's helicopter is shot down, forcing them to travel on foot. Boomerang convinces Slipknot to take off, thinking that the bombs are a ruse, but Flag kills Slipknot by activating the bombs when he tries to escape; satisfying Boomerang's curiosity of the bombs' legitimacy. Scaling a skyscraper and fighting their way through waves of heavily mutated soldiers under Enchantress' control, the team discover the mission target was Waller herself.

As Waller and the squad await helicopter extraction, they are attacked by the Joker, who learned of Harley's predicament. With tech stolen from an A.R.G.U.S. laboratory, the Joker disables Harley's bomb, and helps her escape. Waller shoots down the Joker's helicopter, though Harley survives and rejoins the squad, believing the Joker is dead. Enchantress captures Waller to regain her heart. Deadshot finds Waller's top-secret files and discovers Flag's relationship with Moone. The team abandon Flag, sharing a drink in an abandoned bar, where El Diablo reveals his powers and criminal lifestyle led to the deaths of his family. Flag relieves the squad of their mission, but realizing they have the opportunity to prove themselves, the group set out to save the city.

The squad attack Enchantress, while Killer Croc and Flag's platoon of Navy SEALs plant a bomb beneath the subway to kill Incubus. El Diablo embraces his pyrokinesis, sacrificing himself to maneuver and keep Incubus in the right spot. Enchantress invites the squad to join her, and Harley pretends to be tempted to get close enough to cut out Enchantress's heart. Flag crushes her heart, killing her and releasing Moone. Waller deducts ten years off each squad member's sentence and fulfill their requests (except for Boomerang, who is instead detained). The Joker, who is still alive, breaks into Belle Reve and rescues Harley.

In a mid-credits scene, Waller meets with Bruce Wayne, who agrees to protect her from the legal consequences of the events in Midway City in exchange for government files on the growing metahuman community. He reveals his plans to contact the heroes in the file, including the Flash and Aquaman, in order to build his own superhero team. (Note: The story continues in Justice League (2017) and its 2021 director's cut) (Note: The team is identified off-screen as the Justice League.) She advises him to stop working late nights, implying she knows Bruce is Batman. In response, he tells Waller to shut down Task Force X or he and his "friends" will do it for her.

== Cast ==
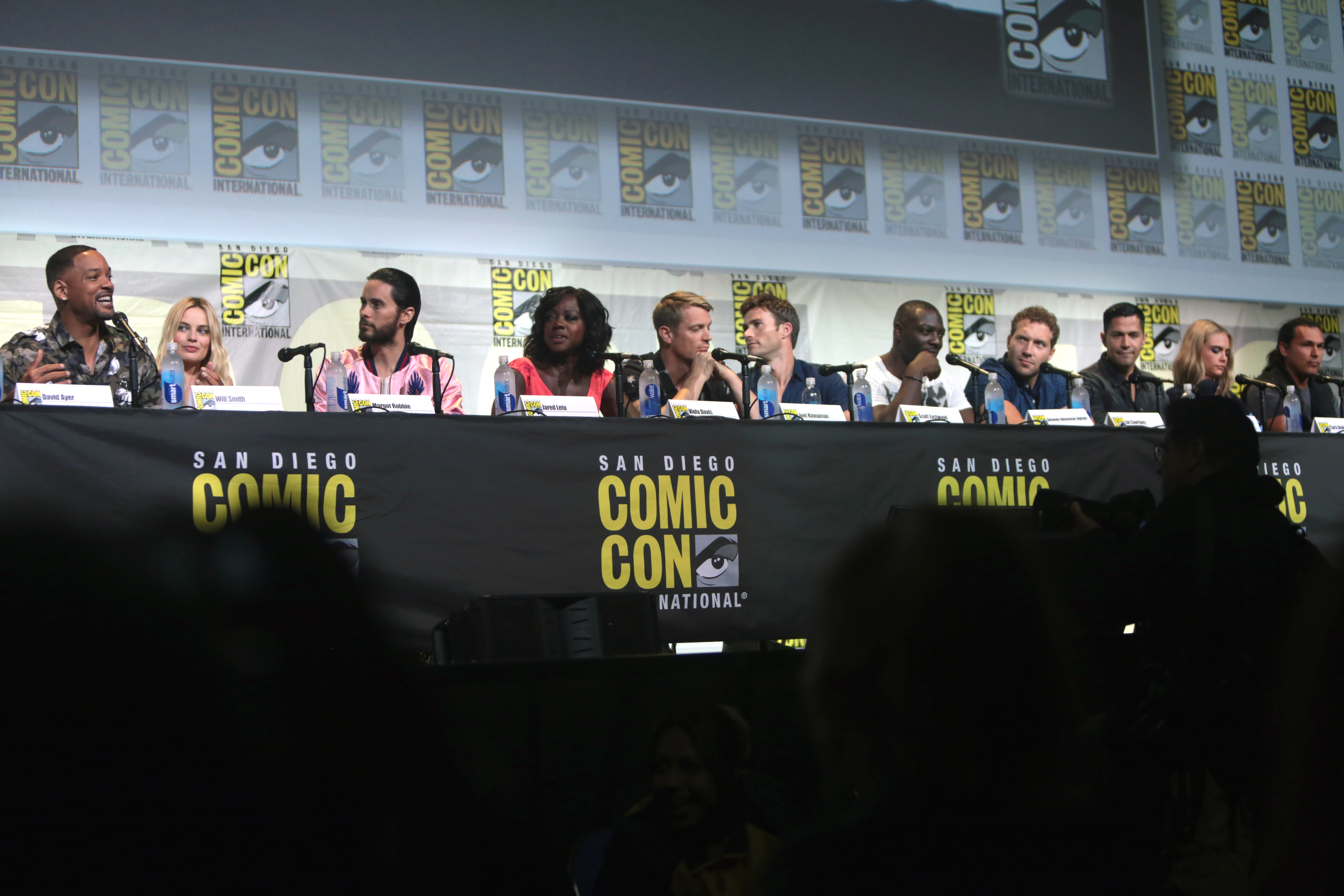
Cast of Suicide Squad at the 2016 San Diego Comic-Con. From left to right: Will Smith, Margot Robbie, Jared Leto, Viola Davis, Joel Kinnaman, Scott Eastwood, Adewale Akinnuoye-Agbaje, Jai Courtney, Jay Hernandez, Cara Delevingne, and Adam Beach

- Will Smith as Floyd Lawton / Deadshot:
  An expert marksman and assassin. A mercenary by day and a concerned father by night, Deadshot is a conflicted criminal who enjoys the hunt but still tries to do right by his young daughter. Smith was simultaneously offered to appear in Suicide Squad and Independence Day: Resurgence, the sequel to Independence Day which he starred in. Smith opted to portray Deadshot, saying that the choice was "nothing about the qualities of the movie—but the choice of trying to go forward versus clinging and clawing backwards."
- Jared Leto as the Joker:
  A psychopathic Gotham City crime lord and the archenemy of Batman. Leto described his role as "nearly Shakespearean" and a "beautiful disaster of a character;" about portraying the villain, he stated, "I took a pretty deep dive. But this was a unique opportunity and I couldn't imagine doing it another way. It was fun, playing these psychological games. But at the same time it was very painful." Leto never broke character throughout filming, with Smith going as far as stating he never met him. In preparation for the role, Leto spent his time alone, listened to gospel music from the 1920s—commenting he senses "Joker may be much older than people think"—and read literature on shamanism. Influences for the character's appearance include the work of Alejandro Jodorowsky. The Joker's tattoos were added by Ayer, who believed they gave the character a modernized gangster look. David Bowie was also cited as an influence on the character by Leto.
- Margot Robbie as Dr. Harleen Quinzel / Harley Quinn:
  A former psychiatrist at Arkham Asylum seduced by the Joker into becoming his crazed partner-in-crime. Producer Richard Suckle described the character as, "a fan fave. Funny, crazy, scary. ... You can't come up with enough adjectives to describe all the different things you see her do." Robbie described Harley as one of the Squad's most manipulative members and her relationship with the Joker as "incredibly dysfunctional", adding that Harley is, "mad about him—like, literally, mad. She's crazy. But she loves him. And it's a really unhealthy, dysfunctional relationship. But an addictive one."
- Joel Kinnaman as Rick Flag Jr.:
  The heroic, military leader of the Task Force X. A West Point graduate and Green Beret colonel who leads the Suicide Squad in the field. He is all business and executes Amanda Waller's orders but does not always agree with her goals or her methods. Tom Hardy was previously cast in the role but was forced to drop out because of scheduling conflicts.
- Viola Davis as Amanda Waller:
  The government official who gives out the Squad's orders. Ambitious and devious, she has big plans and intends to let no metahuman or military protocol get in her way. Davis stated she is fascinated by the character, singling out her psychology and strength and describing her as a "powerful black woman, hard, ready to pick up a gun and shoot anyone at will." She described Waller as "relentless in her villainy" and noted that her powers are "her intelligence and her complete lack of guilt."
- Jai Courtney as Digger Harkness / Captain Boomerang:
  A thief who uses deadly boomerangs, described as rugged, unpredictable and mouthy. About his role, Courtney stated, "he is an absolute bogan, in the purest sense. David Ayer's first instruction was, 'find your inner dirtbag'."
- Karen Fukuhara as Tatsu Yamashiro / Katana:
  A volunteer heroic member of the Task Force X, who acts as Rick Flag's bodyguard. She is a widow and an expert martial artist and swordswoman. Katana mourns her husband's death and wields the Soultaker Blade, a mystical weapon capable of trapping the souls of its victims; the artifact that holds her husband's soul. As she is not a criminal, she does not have a micro-bomb implant. Fukuhara stated that Katana "has morals and codes. She can also slice through hundreds of people without taking a breath."
- Jay Hernandez as Chato Santana / El Diablo:
  A former Los Angeles gang member who has mystical metahuman powers that allow him to summon flames, and transform himself into a monstrous fire entity. He has squelched his fire-conjuring powers to a solitary flame as penance for the horrors he inflicted on those he loved. Hernandez set his character apart from his teammates as he "just wants to stay out of the fight," while "most of [the Squad members] are happy to get out there and kill people."
- Adewale Akinnuoye-Agbaje as Waylon Jones / Killer Croc:
  A cannibalistic metahuman criminal who suffers from a regressive atavism which caused him to develop reptilian features. Being a meta-human, he possesses near superhuman strength, high endurance, and the capacity to breathe underwater. His skin allows him to withstand high caliber weapons and skin abrasion. Akinnuoye-Agbaje described the character as "a cannibal with rage issues".
- Ike Barinholtz as Capt. Hunter Griggs:
  An officer at Belle Reve's Special Security Barracks, the black site where the government imprisons the squad.
- Scott Eastwood as "GQ" Edwards:
  A Navy SEAL Lieutenant who assists Flag during the squad's mission. After working with actor Shia LaBeouf on Fury, Ayer originally sought him out for the role, but the studio was not interested in the actor.
- Adam Beach as Christopher Weiss / Slipknot:
  A man who can climb anything.
- Cara Delevingne as Dr. June Moone / Enchantress:
  An archaeologist who is possessed by an ancient evil force that transforms her into a host of a powerful sorceress, when summoned. Unleashed after a long period of imprisonment, the entity draws the attention of Waller. Delevingne described Moone as "an adventure-seeker who's always wanted some excitement" and Enchantress as "a feral being". Originally, the film was going to feature the revelation that Enchantress was being controlled by Steppenwolf, the main antagonist of Justice League (2017), but this was scrapped after the Justice League story changed.

Additionally, Ben Affleck and Ezra Miller reprise their respective roles of Bruce Wayne / Batman and Barry Allen / The Flash from Batman v Superman: Dawn of Justice; with Affleck's appearance being an uncredited supporting role and Miller's appearance being a cameo role. Alain Chanoine portrays Incubus, the brother of Enchantress, who possesses the body of a businessman in Midway City in order to have a physical form. Jim Parrack and Common appear as the Joker's henchmen, Jonny Frost and Monster T, respectively. David Harbour portrays government official Dexter Tolliver, Alex Meraz portrays Navy SEAL Gomez, and Matt Baram portrays Dr. Van Criss, a scientist at Wayne Enterprises' branch Van Criss Laboratories. Shailyn Pierre-Dixon plays Zoe Lawton, Deadshot's daughter, and Corina Calderon plays Grace Santana, Diablo's wife. David Ayer, writer and director of the film, makes a cameo appearance as a Belle Reve officer.

== Production ==
=== Development ===
The film was announced in 2009 with Dan Lin as producer, Stephen Gilchrist as co-producer and Justin Marks as the screenwriter. David Ayer signed on to direct and write the film in September 2014. He later described the film to Empire as "Dirty Dozen with supervillains". While Ayer's first script originally included Steppenwolf as a force behind Enchantress, this had to change and Ayer had six weeks to rewrite the screenplay, given the release date was already set. This was later misinterpreted as Ayer having written the entire screenplay in six weeks. Two years earlier, the movie Batman: Assault on Arkham had been released with a similar scenario.

=== Casting ===
In October 2014, Warner Bros. had initially offered Ryan Gosling, Tom Hardy, Margot Robbie, and Will Smith roles in the film. In November, TheWrap revealed that Jared Leto was in talks for the role of Joker, for which Gosling was originally sought. The main cast was announced by Warner Brothers in December 2014 with Smith, Hardy, Leto, Robbie, Jai Courtney, and Cara Delevingne along with their respective roles as Deadshot, Rick Flag, the Joker, Harley Quinn, Captain Boomerang, and the Enchantress. Emma Roberts was considered for Harley Quinn before Robbie was cast. The studio was also considering Viola Davis, Octavia Spencer, and Oprah Winfrey for the role of Amanda Waller. Following the announcement of the cast, comic book writer John Ostrander (creator of the modern incarnation of the Suicide Squad) talked with Comic Book Resources about the casting, saying, "I have no problem with the casting... what I am really impressed by with all of the casting is that they are getting some very good actors to play these parts."

In January 2015, Davis expressed interest in playing Amanda Waller during an interview, saying "I'm fascinated by [Waller]." Meanwhile, Tom Hardy had to drop out as Rick Flag because of scheduling issues with his film The Revenant. Hardy later stated that he was disappointed that he had to leave the role as he liked the script. Jake Gyllenhaal, who worked with Ayer on End of Watch, was then given an offer to replace Hardy as Flag, but he declined. The studio was then looking at Joel Kinnaman to play the role. In February, Jay Hernandez joined the cast and Kinnaman was also confirmed to play Flag. At the 87th Academy Awards, it was revealed that Davis had been cast as Amanda Waller. In March 2015, boxer Raymond Olubawale was reported to have an unspecified role in the film, and Scott Eastwood announced that he had been cast. Later that month, it was confirmed that Adewale Akinnuoye-Agbaje and Karen Fukuhara had been cast as Killer Croc and Katana, respectively. Adam Beach, Ike Barinholtz, and Jim Parrack were added to the cast in April 2015. In January 2016, Ben Affleck was confirmed to reprise his role as Batman from Batman v Superman: Dawn of Justice.

=== Filming ===
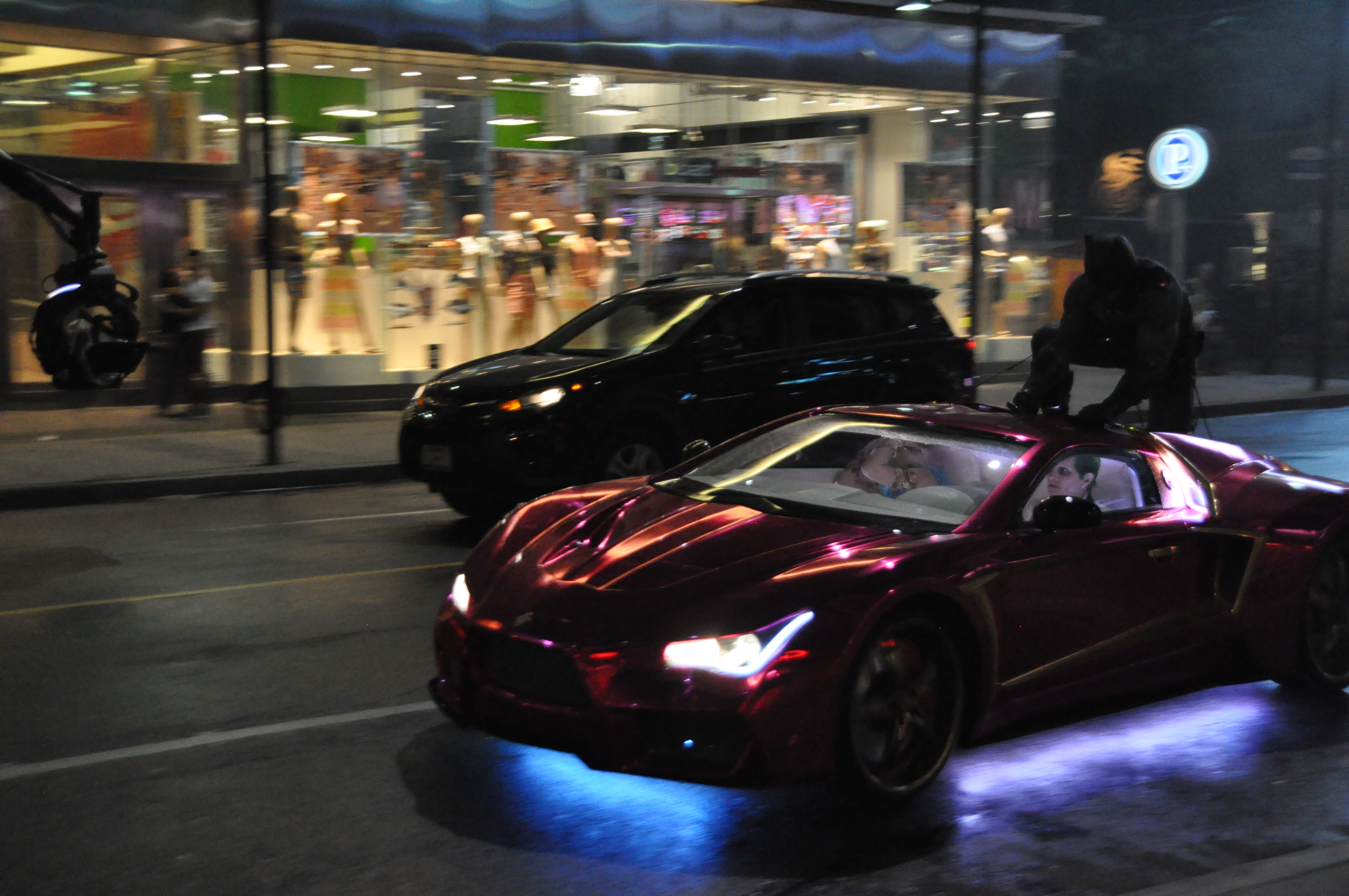
Filming of a chase sequence on Yonge Street in Downtown Toronto, May 2015

Filming began on April 13, 2015, in Toronto. On April 26 and 27, filming took place at Hy's Steakhouse. A "snowstorm" scene was filmed on April 29 on Adelaide St. and in Ching Lane. On May 5, a few major scenes were filmed in downtown Toronto next to Yonge and Dundas Square. Principal photography wrapped on August 28, 2015 after additional filming took place in Chicago, Illinois. The visual effects were later provided by Moving Picture Company, Sony Pictures Imageworks, Mammal Studios and Ollin VFX and Supervised by Robert Winter, Mark Breakspaer, Gregory D. Liegey, Charlie Iturriaga and Jerome Chen as the Production Supervisor.

=== Post-production ===
The film had a troubled post-production. Editor John Gilroy left the project in early 2016, leading to Charles Roven recommending Lee Smith to Ayer "to take a slightly different approach, but not totally change the tone of the movie with his work". Smith created Ayer's final picture-locked director's cut based on Gilroy's Assemblies, and remains credited as an editor in the final film. This cut ran roughly 143 minutes, contained no additional music outside of Steven Price's score, and had a linear arrangement of scenes. Additional editor Kevin Hickman confirmed the tone and pacing was militaristic and akin to Black Hawk Down. Warner executives worked on a different cut than Ayer's, with assistance from the company that had made the film's teaser, and tested it against a "somber" version Ayer presented. Roven noted that second cut was not Smith's cut, but by an unknown editor. Ayer later confirmed that this version was a modified version of the studio's cut. After both versions tested near-identically, the studio decided to do reshoots to reach a place of "consensus" between the two versions.

Reshoots written by Geoff Johns ensued in 2016 following Warner's desire to compromise the tested cuts together and make a more light-hearted film overall; it was reported the reshoots cost as much as $22 million (more than the typical $6–10 million that additional filming costs). It was also confirmed that Zack Snyder filmed a scene with the Flash while shooting Justice League in London, while Ayer was in post-production on Suicide Squad. These reshoots included an almost entirely different third act from the original, and new versions of scenes featuring Harley Quinn and the Joker to make their relationship less abusive and more appealing to teenage audiences. Ayer confirmed that the film was completed on June 24, 2016.

=== Music ===
Steven Price, who previously worked with Ayer on Fury, composed the score for Suicide Squad. Suicide Squad: Original Motion Picture Score was announced for a release date of August 8, 2016. A soundtrack album for the film, titled Suicide Squad: The Album, was announced in June 2016, and released on August 5, 2016. Many artists were featured on the soundtrack, including Kehlani, Logic, Skylar Grey, Wiz Khalifa, Ty Dolla Sign, X Ambassadors, Lil Wayne, and Imagine Dragons. The album's lead single, "Heathens" by Twenty One Pilots, was released on June 20, 2016. A music video for the song, set in a prison and featuring footage from the film, was released on June 21. "Sucker for Pain" was released as the second single on June 24. The album's third single, "Purple Lamborghini" by Skrillex and Rick Ross, was released on July 22. "Gangsta" by Kehlani; "Standing in the Rain" by Action Bronson, Mark Ronson, and Dan Auerbach of The Black Keys; "Medieval Warfare" by Grimes; and a cover of Queen's "Bohemian Rhapsody" performed by Panic! at the Disco were released as four promotional singles on August 2, August 3, and August 4, 2016, respectively, with "Medieval Warfare" and "Bohemian Rhapsody" being released on the same day.

== Release ==
Suicide Squad premiered at the Beacon Theatre in New York City on August 1, 2016. The subsequent London premiere took place on August 3, 2016. It was theatrically released in the United States on August 5, 2016.

=== Marketing ===
Suicide Squad held a panel at the 2015 San Diego Comic-Con, with stars Smith, Robbie, Courtney, Davis, and Kinnaman among those who appeared. A trailer intended to be exclusive to the event premiered but was leaked online, with Warner Bros. responding by stating they would not release an official version. However, the following day, Warner Bros. released an official version, stating: "Warner Bros. Pictures and our anti-piracy team have worked tirelessly over the last 48 hours to contain the Suicide Squad footage that was pirated from Hall H on Saturday. We have been unable to achieve that goal. Today we will release the same footage that has been illegally circulating on the web, in the form it was created and high quality with which it was intended to be enjoyed. We regret this decision as it was our intention to keep the footage as a unique experience for the Comic-Con crowd, but we cannot continue to allow the film to be represented by the poor quality of the pirated footage stolen from our presentation."

=== Home media ===
Suicide Squad was released on Digital HD on November 15, 2016, and on Blu-ray, 4K Ultra-HD Blu-Ray, Blu-Ray 3D, and DVD on December 13, 2016. An extended cut of the film is included in the home entertainment releases, except for the DVD version. The extended cut contains roughly thirteen minutes of footage absent from the theatrical version. A novelization of the movie was written by Marv Wolfman. Ayer has suggested that this is truer to his vision than the theatrical cut of the film.

== Reception ==
=== Box office ===
Suicide Squad was a box office success, grossing $325.1 million in the United States and Canada and $424.1 million in other territories for a worldwide total of $749.2 million, against a production budget of $175 million ($325 million including advertising and promotion costs). Suicide Squad was highly anticipated by audiences worldwide. It recorded a worldwide opening of $267.1 million from 59 countries and IMAX global debut of $18.2 million, both of which set new records for the month of August. That is also the second-best debut worldwide for a DC property after Dawn of Justice ($422.5 million) and the seventh-best for a superhero title. The Hollywood Reporter highlighted that Dawn of Justice had an advantage of receiving a coveted day-and-date release with China, while Suicide Squad did not secure a release date in the country. Forbes pointed out that had the film secured a release in China, it might well have matched or topped the $773 million total of Guardians of the Galaxy and the $782 million gross of Deadpool. Deadline Hollywood calculated the net profit of the film to be $158.45 million, when factoring together all expenses and revenues for the film, making it the 10th-most-profitable release of 2016.

==== North America ====
Projections for its opening weekend in the United States and Canada were being continuously revised upwards starting from $100 million to as high as $150 million. The film opened across 4,255 theaters, the widest for the month of August. Of that, 382 theaters were in IMAX, over 490 large-format screens locations, 270-plus drive-ins, 180-plus D-Box locations and over 200 dine-in/luxury theaters. It opened Friday, August 5, 2016, on about 11,000 screens and earned $65.1 million, marking the biggest August opening and single day, and the third-biggest opening-day gross of 2016. Of that, $5.8 million came from IMAX theaters, also a new August record. This includes $20.5 million it earned from Thursday previews, which began at 6:00 pm, setting the record for biggest-ever preview of August and the second-biggest for a non-sequel film (behind Man of Steel). IMAX comprised $2.4 million (12%) of that figure. Much like Batman v Superman and The Dark Knight Rises, however, the film saw a steep Friday-to-Saturday decline, grossing $38.8 million (a drop of 41%). In total, it earned $133.7 million in its opening weekend, setting records for the month of August (previously held by Guardians of the Galaxy) and for Will Smith's career (previously held by I Am Legend). It is also the second-biggest debut for a non-sequel, behind The Hunger Games ($152 million), the fourth-biggest of the year and the fifth-biggest for Warner Bros. IMAX made up $11 million of the opening numbers from 382 theaters, $200,000 shy of breaking Guardians of the Galaxy's record. Nevertheless, it did beat Guardians of the Galaxy's $7.6 million in terms of premium large format screens which comprised $13 million. For Cinemark XD screens, which made $3.2 million, the sixth-highest opening.

The opening numbers helped Warner Bros. push past the $1 billion mark in North America for the sixteenth year in a row. The film also helped the total weekend tickets sales to an unprecedented $221.3 million in August. Previously, August has not exceeded $200 million at the box office in a single weekend in North America. Suicide Squad scored a massive debut primarily on the backs of the under-35 set which made up 76% of the opening weekend. Audiences were also diverse, with African Americans and Hispanic Americans making up 41% of the patrons.

Following its record breaking opening weekend, it posted the biggest August Monday gross with $13.1 million, a drop of 56.5% from its Sunday gross. This broke Guardians of the Galaxy's previous record of $11.7 million, and also the biggest August Tuesday with $14.3 million, up 9% from its Monday take. The film has earned the biggest Friday, Saturday, Sunday, Monday and Tuesday in August history. It made $179.1 million in its first week of release, the fourth-biggest of the year. Despite earning $13.4 million on its second Friday, the film dropped 79%, slightly less than Batman v Superman's 81% drop. Following a first-place finish in its first weekend of release, the film faced a steep decline of 67.2% in its second weekend, earning an estimated $43.8 million to score the biggest August second-weekend gross. It also passed the $200 million mark in ten days and was able to hold the top spot for the second time in a row despite competition from the comedy Sausage Party. However, the drop is one of the biggest declines for a studio superhero film, and for Warner Bros., which The Hollywood Reporter called it "deja vu all over again" after Batman v Superman tumbled 69% in its second weekend earlier in the year. The second weekend decline is the second biggest in summer history, behind Warcraft's historic 70% drop in June of the same year. The site also highlighted possible reasons for the significantly steep drop: dismal reviews, general apathy among moviegoers, altering movie-going habits and competition.

After three weeks of holding the top spot, it was overtaken by Don't Breathe on its fourth weekend. It maintained the second spot in its fifth weekend and registered its best hold with a 20% decline while also passing the $300 million threshold on its thirty-second day of release. It remained in the top ten for eight weekends until falling off in its ninth weekend.

==== Other territories ====
Internationally, Suicide Squad secured a release in approximately 62 countries. It was released in 57 countries (70% of the marketplace) in conjuncture with its North American debut, including France, South Korea, Australia, Russia and the Commonwealth of Independent States (CIS), Brazil, the United Kingdom, Republic of Ireland, Spain and Mexico beginning from Wednesday, August 3. According to trackings, the film was projected to have an opening anywhere between $85 million to $120 million, which would be a new August international debut record. Deadline Hollywood pointed out that although the film is a lesser-known property, similar to Guardians of the Galaxy, stars such as Will Smith are better known internationally, which could potentially aid the film's performance. It opened Wednesday, August 3, 2016, in 7 countries, earning $8.1 million. It opened in 50 more countries on August 4 and 5, earning $53.8 million for a three-day total of $64.6 million from 57 countries. Through Sunday, August 7, it delivered a five-day opening of $133.3 million from 57 countries on 17,630 screens, nearly double the previous August record held by Guardians of the Galaxy. It also set IMAX opening record with $7 million. It added $58.7 million on its second weekend, a drop of 57% on 15,600 screens in 62 territories. After two straight wins, it was overtaken by the animated The Secret Life of Pets in its third weekend.

It recorded the biggest opening day of all time for Warner Bros. in Russia ($3.9 million), the biggest August opening day in the United Kingdom ($6.2 million), Brazil ($3 million), South Korea ($2.9 million, also the second biggest Warner Bros. opening day), France ($2.7 million), Sweden ($564,000) and Holland ($517,000, also the biggest opening of the year). Mexico and Spain opened with $3.9 million and $1.4 million, respectively. In terms of opening weekend, the film recorded the biggest Warner Bros. opening of all time in Russia ($11.4 million). In Brazil, despite playing amidst the 2016 Summer Olympics, it managed to open with $11.75 million, marking the biggest August opening weekend of all time, the biggest Will Smith opening, and the fourth-biggest opening for a superhero film. Its opening numbers alone made it the second-biggest film for the studio there. In South Korea, although the film was off to a strong start, it was eventually overtaken by The Last Princess and Operation Chromite debuting at No. 3. It made $10.8 million in five days (Wednesday to Sunday). The UK and Ireland posted the biggest opening market for the film with £11.25 million ($14.8 million) from 573 theaters. Discounting previews, it delivered the third-biggest UK opening of the year, behind Batman v Superman: Dawn of Justice (£14.62 million) and Captain America: Civil War (£14.47 million). It also became the first newly released film of August since 2014 to debut above £3 million. Elsewhere, it scored the biggest August opening in Australia ($10.5 million), Mexico ($10.4 million) and Argentina ($2.5 million), while in Spain, it recorded the biggest DC opening with $3.4 million, where it was behind The Secret Life of Pets for the weekend and France a $7.9 million opening. It opened in first place in India for a non-local film with $1.8 million from 462 screens, despite facing competition from Jason Bourne ($1.1 million from 1,027 screens) which also opened on the same weekend. Despite the later film occupying twice the screen number of the former, Suicide Squad managed to take the top spot. Italy opened with an estimated $2.2 million in two days, that's the biggest opening for Smith there. It opened in first place in Germany with $6.9 million. It opened in Japan—the film's last market—on September 9 where it debuted with $3.8 million. It finished in second spot (and first among new releases) behind local anime Your Name. With such a robust opening, Variety projected that the film would end its run there around $20 million. It has so far grossed $9.4 million there.

In terms of total earnings, its biggest market outside of North America is the UK ($43.3 million), followed by Brazil ($35.1 million) and Mexico ($27.1 million). In two weeks, it became the second-highest-grossing Warner Bros. film of all time in Brazil behind Dawn of Justice.

=== Critical response ===
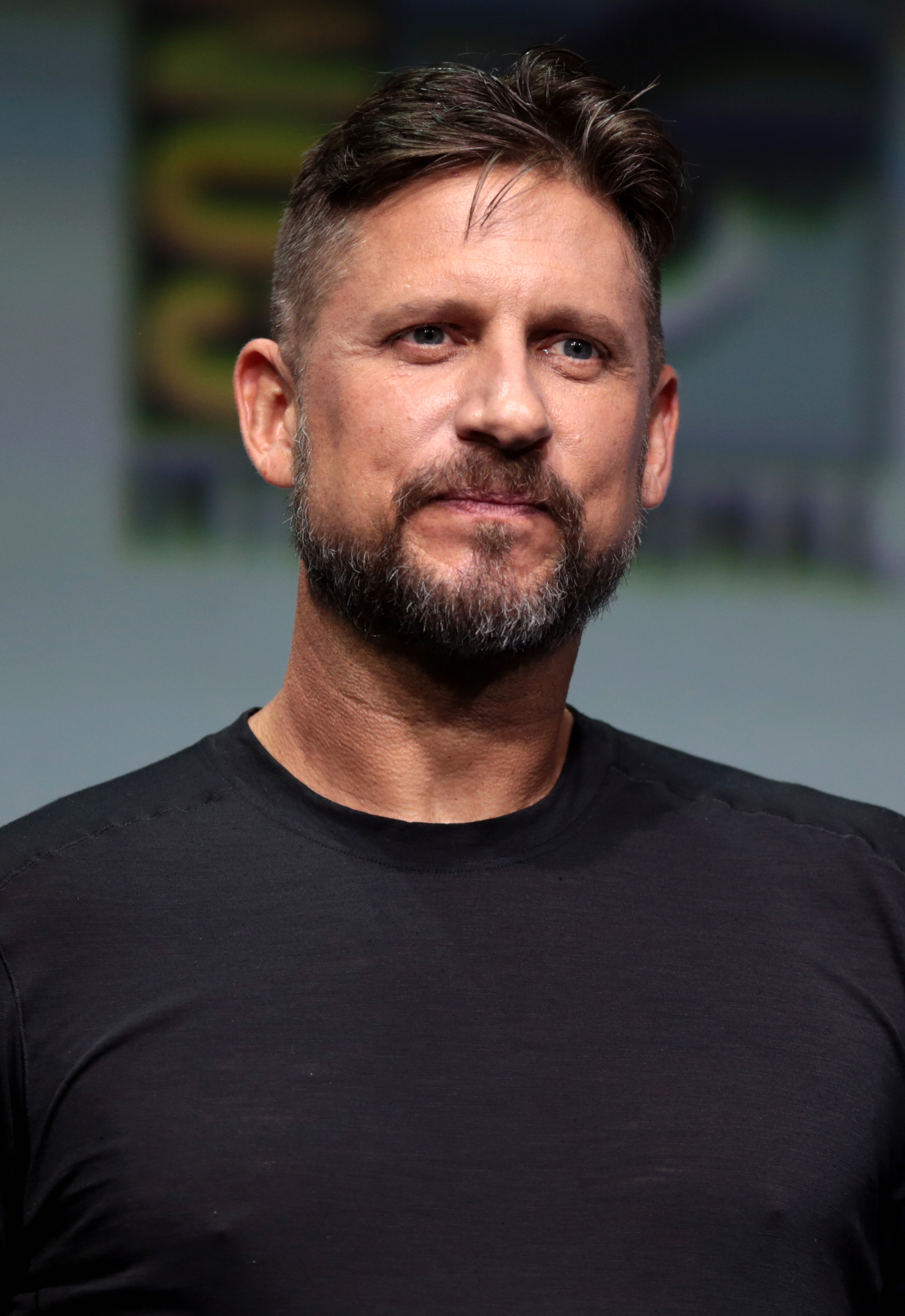
"The studio cut is not my movie. Read that again.": David Ayer on Twitter, 2021.

On Rotten Tomatoes, the film has an approval rating of 26% based on 394 reviews, with an average rating of 4.8/10. The site's critical consensus reads, "Suicide Squad boasts a talented cast and a little more humor than previous DCEU efforts, but they aren't enough to save the disappointing end result from a muddled plot, thinly written characters, and choppy directing." On Metacritic, the film has a weighted average of 40 out of 100, based on 53 critics, indicating "mixed or average" reviews. Audiences polled by CinemaScore gave the film an average grade of "B+" on an A+ to F scale, while PostTrak reported filmgoers gave it a 73% overall positive score.

Rolling Stone's Peter Travers wrote, "DC Comics tries something different with Suicide Squad, an all-star collection of crime fighting villains—and the result is anything but super." Richard Lawson of Vanity Fair said, "Suicide Squad is just bad. It's ugly and boring, a toxic combination that means the film's highly fetishized violence doesn't even have the exciting tingle of the wicked or the taboo." Writing for The Wall Street Journal, Joe Morgenstern heavily criticized the film saying, "In a word, Suicide Squad is trash. In two words, it's ugly trash." He further said, it "amounts to an all-out attack on the whole idea of entertainment," and called the film a product of "shameless pandering".

Chris Nashawaty of Entertainment Weekly gave the film a B−, saying, "Suicide Squad kicks off with fizzy, punk-rock ferocity before turning flat and spiraling into familiar formulas," and called Jared Leto's "scene-stealing" the Joker "wasted" and "stranded in the periphery". He concluded by saying, "For DC, Suicide Squad is a small step forward. But it could have been a giant leap." IGN gave the film 5.9 out of 10, saying: "Suicide Squad is a decidedly different flavor than Batman v Superman. It goes for subversive, funny and stylish, and it succeeds wildly during the first act. But then the movie turns into something predictable and unexciting." Drew McWeeny from HitFix gave it a positive review, writing "Suicide Squad is not the darkest mainstream superhero comic book movie ever made, nor is it even the darkest live-action film featuring Batman ever made. However, it is gleefully nihilistic, and it takes a different approach to what has become a fairly familiar story form at this point, right at the moment when it feels like superhero movies either have to evolve or die." Brian Truitt from USA Today wrote, "Compared to its ilk, Suicide Squad is an excellently quirky, proudly raised middle finger to the staid superhero-movie establishment." Christy Lemire from RogerEbert.com wrote "Writer/director David Ayer has created a movie that’s simultaneously underwritten and overstuffed. It has too many characters yet precious few who even come close to resembling actual human beings."

Margot Robbie's performance as Harley Quinn was well received, with many critics eager to see more of the character in future films. In January 2017, David Ayer said he wished he had done certain things differently in the film including story elements, as well as giving more screen time to the Joker. Ayer, responding to a tweet, has since admitted that he had objectified the presence of Harley in the film, and has apologized for his treatment of her character. In June 2021, Joel Kinnaman said that he was disappointed with Suicide Squad: "I thought the first 40 minutes of the film were fucking great, and then there were conflicting visions and it just didn't end up being what we all hoped it was. It didn't feel like the movie that we hoped we were going to make." In August 2023, Ayer singled out the movie as his biggest Hollywood heartbreak: "Hollywood, I tell people, is like watching someone you love get fucked by someone you hate," Ayer said. "The big one is Suicide Squad. That shit broke me. That handed me my ass."

=== Accolades ===
Suicide Squad was nominated for various awards, winning several. Alessandro Bertolazzi, Giorgio Gregorini, and Christopher Nelson won the Academy Award for Best Makeup and Hairstyling for their work on the film. Additionally, Margot Robbie won the Critics' Choice Movie Award for Best Actress in an Action Movie and the film received three Grammy Award nominations.

== Future ==
The film's mid-credits scene glimpses the 2017 film Justice League. There were also multiple spin-offs and sequels announced to be in development:

=== Sequel ===
The Suicide Squad was announced with intention of David Ayer to return as director from the first film, but Ayer left the project to instead work on the ultimately cancelled Gotham City Sirens. This followed with Gavin O'Connor hired as co-screenwriter-director, while production was originally slated to begin October 2018, though the script's similarities to Birds of Prey led to principal photography delays. James Gunn was later hired to re-write the screenplay, after he was fired from Marvel Studios. Gunn directed the film, and unlike the original film which was rated PG-13, its sequel carried an R rating. The film was released in August 2021, to positive reviews from critics, who praised Gunn's script, direction, and visual style. The film was in turn followed by spin-off television series Peacemaker, starring John Cena as Christopher Smith / Peacemaker. The series was released in January 2022 for HBO Max.

=== Spin-offs ===
After the release and financial success of Suicide Squad, Warner Bros. and DC Studios announced six separate films being developed featuring Margot Robbie reprising her role as Harley Quinn. Various sources reported that the studios planned to feature the anti-heroine in a trilogy of films for the character's first story-arc.

- Birds of Prey: The film features Harley, who after being left by the Joker, teams up with other antiheroes to protect Cassandra Cain from Gotham City crime boss Roman Sionis / Black Mask. Cathy Yan serves as director, with a script by Christina Hodson. Principal photography lasted from January through April 2019. The film was released on February 7, 2020, to a generally positive reception from critics.
- Gotham City Sirens: Gotham City Sirens was set to be directed by David Ayer, with a script from Geneva Robertson-Dworet. The project was originally scheduled to begin production mid-2017, though the film was delayed due to the production team's busy schedules on other projects, and in favor of Birds of Prey. Despite the project's delay, Ayer continued to work on developing the film, but later stated that the film was on hold.
- Untitled Deadshot film: In December 2016, a film centered around Floyd Lawton / Deadshot was announced to be in development.
- Untitled Harley Quinn film: By May 2020, Warner Bros. was in talks to make another Harley Quinn film set after The Suicide Squad.

=== #ReleaseTheAyerCut movement ===
Concurrent to the similar #ReleaseTheSnyderCut movement around Justice League, fans also began the #ReleaseTheAyerCut campaign. Calls strengthened following the announcement of Zack Snyder's Justice League in May 2020 due to the success of the #ReleaseTheSnyderCut movement campaign, garnering support from the director and writer David Ayer. He has requested assistance in bringing his own vision into HBO Max, where Snyder's cut was released in 2021. The following are some notable ideas and subplots that were filmed but left out, as well as several reshoots and script alterations that took place during post-production:

- The first 40 minutes of the film were cut with sections of it potentially being used for the flashbacks in the film.
- The third act was changed with the Joker originally having an influence within it, with the majority of Leto's scenes being omitted from the theatrical cut, which upset Leto.
- Diablo would have originally survived.
- Harley Quinn, Slipknot, Batman, Enchantress, and Katana originally had larger roles, with Katana having become possessed and attacking the team at one point.
- Scenes showing Harley and the Joker's abusive relationship were removed from the theatrical cut.
- A Killer Croc line was added for the theatrical cut without Ayer's input.
- Geoff Johns added Harley being an accomplice to Robin's murder to the theatrical cut.
- Parts of the original score were replaced with pop songs for the theatrical cut.
- The final cut was taken away from Ayer and instead handed to trailer production company, Trailer Park, Inc.

After the fan's campaign was launched, Ayer later stated in July how his vision was changed due to the success of Deadpool and the negative criticism received by Snyder's Batman v Superman: Dawn of Justice, highlighting an early trailer that "nailed the tone and intention of the film [he] made", saying that his "soulful drama was beaten into a 'comedy'". Later that month, Ayer confirmed that a director's cut for Suicide Squad "definitely exists" and requested that AT&T "[let] it see the sunlight". Ayer also confirmed that the official movie novelization by Marv Wolfman is closer to his original cut than the cinematic release. Affleck's stunt double Richard Cetrone said the film would have included "more Batman". Many Suicide Squad cast and crew members, and other directors of DCEU movies or actors, have voiced their support for a release of the director's cut.

In March 2021, Ann Sarnoff, the then-chairman and CEO of Warner Bros., said that the company had no intentions to release Ayer's cut of the film. Ayer responded to Sarnoff's comments on Twitter asking "Why?". Despite Sarnoff's comments, fans have continued to campaign for the cut, with the phrase "Release the Ayer Cut" trending on Twitter with 80 thousand tweets on March 22, and again on April 16, reaching over 100 thousand tweets. Ayer once again criticized the theatrical cut of Suicide Squad on before praising James Gunn's sequel in July, adamantly stating that "the studio cut [was] not [his] movie".

In an April 2022 interview, actor Jay Hernandez reaffirmed his support for the cut's possible release. According to Hernandez, co-stars like Leto and Kinnaman and everyone else that he had talked to were in full support of the release. Hernandez suggested that a streaming service like HBO Max should release the cut. HBO Max stated that there were no plans currently to release the cut. Ayer later said in May that his cut would only require finishing the VFX work and that no reshoots would be needed. Ayer held a private screening for the admin of the official Twitter account for the #ReleaseTheAyerCut movement in October that shed further light on the state of his cut after sharing the shooting script with them in the previous year. In August 2023, Ayer said that he talked about his director's cut with Gunn, who had recently been named co-CEO of DC Studios with Peter Safran, and stated that it would be released sometime in the future. In January 2024, Ayer ceased supporting the release of his director's cut, citing a lack of interest by Warner Bros. and his desire to move on from it as the reason. Despite that, that August, Ayer returned to campaigning for his director's cut once again. Ayer stated in a 2025 interview with The Hollywood Reporter that Gunn was still interested in releasing his cut, but wanted to "first get some scores on the board".
