= Alessandro Bertolazzi =

Italian makeup artist

- Born: 16 February 1958 (age 68); Casanova Elvo, Piedmont, Italy
- Occupation: Makeup artist
- Years active: 1988–present

Alessandro Bertolazzi (born 16 February 1958) is an Italian makeup artist. His work on films such as Babel (2006), Biutiful (2010), J. Edgar (2011), To the Wonder (2012), Skyfall (2012), The Impossible (2012), Fury (2014) and Suicide Squad has earned him numerous awards and nominations. For Suicide Squad, he won the Academy Award for Best Makeup and Hairstyling at the 89th Academy Awards.

== Partial filmography ==
- Flight of the Innocent (1992)
- The Rebel (1993)
- The Best Man (1998)
- Viola Kisses Everybody (1998)
- The Phantom of the Opera (1998)
- Malèna (2000)
- Unfair Competition (2001)
- Heaven (2002)
- Remember Me, My Love (2003)
- The Order (2003)
- What Will Happen to Us (2004)
- Evilenko (2004)
- But When Do the Girls Get Here? (2005)
- The Fine Art of Love (2005)
- Babel (2006)
- Napoleon and Me (2006)
- Gomorrah (2008)
- Wild Blood (2008)
- Giovanna's Father (2008)
- Angels & Demons (2009)
- Baarìa (2009)
- Biutiful (2010)
- Kiss Me Again (2010)
- Eat Pray Love (2010)
- The Solitude of Prime Numbers (2010)
- J. Edgar (2011)
- To Rome with Love (2012)
- To the Wonder (2012)
- Twice Born (2012)
- Skyfall (2012)
- The Impossible (2012)
- Fury (2014)
- Love & Mercy (2014)
- Suicide Squad (2016)
- Bright (2017)
- War Machine (2017)
- Christopher Robin (2018)
- The King (2019)
