= Giorgio Gregorini =

Italian make-up artist

Giorgio Gregorini is an Italian makeup artist. He has worked on films such as Moulin Rouge! (2001), Gangs of New York (2002), Troy (2004), Kingdom of Heaven (2005), Babel (2006), Avengers: Age of Ultron (2015) and Suicide Squad (2016), which has earned him numerous awards and nominations. For the latter he won Academy Award for Best Makeup and Hairstyling at 89th Academy Awards.

== Awards and nominations ==
- 2002: Primetime Emmy Award for Outstanding Hairstyling for a Limited Series or Movie - Arabian Nights
- 2012: Primetime Emmy Award for Outstanding Hairstyling for a Limited Series or Movie - Hatfields & McCoys
- 2017: Academy Award for Best Makeup and Hairstyling - Suicide Squad
