= List of Emily Blunt performances =

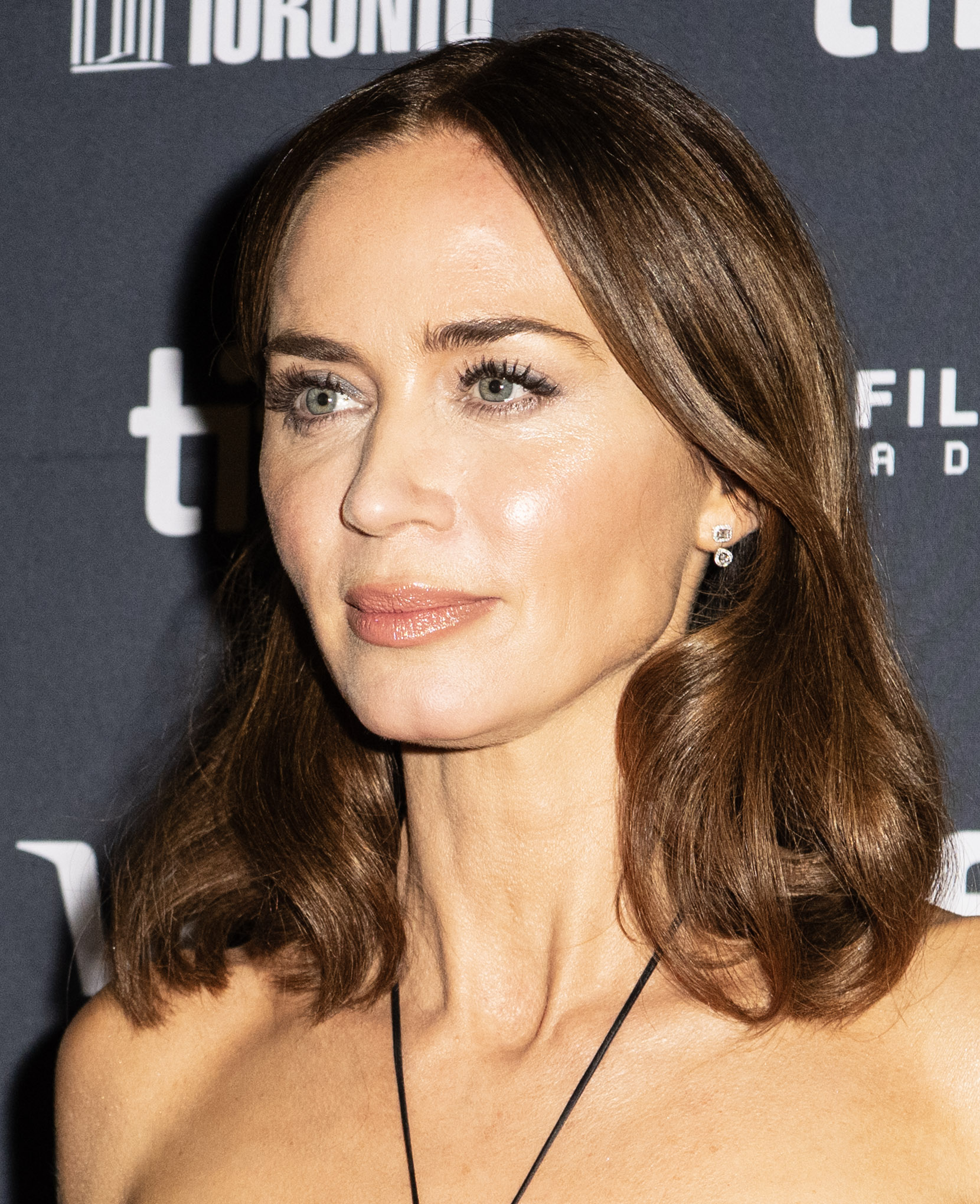
Blunt at the premiere of The Smashing Machine at the Toronto International Film Festival in 2025

English actress Emily Blunt began her career as a teenager at the West End theatre, appearing alongside Judi Dench in a production of The Royal Family in 2001. Her first screen appearance was in the television film Boudica (2003), and she made her film debut with the lead role of a teenager exploring her homosexuality in Paweł Pawlikowski's drama My Summer of Love (2004). For playing the title role of an emotionally troubled young woman in the BBC television film Gideon's Daughter (2006), Blunt won the Golden Globe Award for Best Supporting Actress – Series, Miniseries or Television Film. In the same year, she gained wider recognition for playing a fashion editor's assistant in the American comedy The Devil Wears Prada, earning a nomination for the BAFTA Award for Best Actress in a Supporting Role.

Following this breakthrough, Blunt played lead roles in several films, including the period drama The Young Victoria (2009), the science fiction romance The Adjustment Bureau (2011), and the romance Salmon Fishing in the Yemen (2011). In 2014, she starred as a hardened sergeant in the action film Edge of Tomorrow and as the Baker's Wife in the musical fantasy Into the Woods. She gained praise for playing a principled FBI agent in the crime film Sicario (2015) and an alcoholic in the thriller The Girl on the Train (2016); the latter earned her a nomination for the BAFTA Award for Best Actress in a Leading Role. In 2018, she starred in the critically acclaimed horror film A Quiet Place, directed by her husband John Krasinski, and in the musical fantasy Mary Poppins Returns, in which she played the title character. The former earned her the Screen Actors Guild Award for Best Supporting Actress. She has since starred in the sequel A Quiet Place Part II, the adventure film Jungle Cruise (both 2021), and the revisionist Western television miniseries The English (2022). In 2023, she portrayed Katherine Oppenheimer in Christopher Nolan's biographical thriller film Oppenheimer, which earned her a nomination for the Academy Award for Best Supporting Actress, and ranks as her highest-grossing release.

Alongside her screen work, Blunt has provided her voice to several animated films, including Gnomeo & Juliet (2011) and its sequel Sherlock Gnomes (2018), and the English dub for The Wind Rises (2013). She has also narrated the audiobook Sum: Forty Tales from the Afterlives in 2010, and recorded songs for the soundtrack of her films Into the Woods, My Little Pony: The Movie, and Mary Poppins Returns.

== Film ==
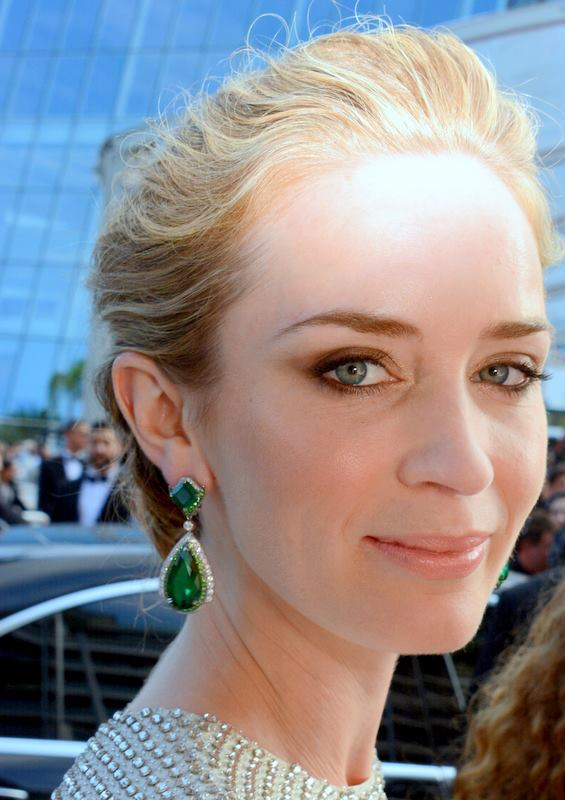
Blunt at the 2015 Cannes Film Festival

Key
†	Denotes films that have not yet been released

Year (Note: Refers to the film's earliest release)	Title	Role	Notes	Ref(s)
2004	My Summer of Love	Tamsin		
2006	The Devil Wears Prada	Emily Charlton		
2006	Irresistible	Mara		
2007	Wind Chill	Girl		
2007	The Jane Austen Book Club	Prudie Drummond		
2007	Dan in Real Life	Ruthie Draper		
2007	Charlie Wilson's War	Jane Liddle		
2008	The Great Buck Howard	Valerie Brennan		
2008	Sunshine Cleaning	Norah Lorkowski		
2009	The Young Victoria	Queen Victoria		
2009	Curiosity	Emma	Short film	
2010	The Wolfman	Gwen Conliffe		
2010	Wild Target	Rose		
2010	Gulliver's Travels	Princess Mary		
2011	Gnomeo & Juliet	Juliet	Voice	
2011	The Adjustment Bureau	Elise Sellas		
2011	Salmon Fishing in the Yemen	Harriet Chetwode-Talbot		
2011	Your Sister's Sister	Iris		
2011	The Muppets	Miss Piggy's Receptionist	Cameo	
2012	The Five-Year Engagement	Violet Barnes		
2012	Looper	Sara		
2012	Arthur Newman	Michaela / Charlotte Fitzgerald (Note: She played a dual role in the film.)		
2014	The Wind Rises	Naoko Satomi	Voice; English dub	
2014	Edge of Tomorrow	Rita Vrataski		
2014	Into the Woods	Baker's Wife		
2015	Sicario	Kate Macer		
2016	The Huntsman: Winter's War	Queen Freya		
2016	The Girl on the Train	Rachel Watson		
2017	Animal Crackers	Zoe Huntington	Voice	
2017	My Little Pony: The Movie	Tempest Shadow / Fizzlepop Berrytwist	Voice	
2018	A Quiet Place	Evelyn Abbott		
2018	Sherlock Gnomes	Juliet	Voice	
2018	Mary Poppins Returns	Mary Poppins		
2020	A Quiet Place Part II	Evelyn Abbott		
2020	Wild Mountain Thyme	Rosemary Muldoon		
2021	Jungle Cruise	Lily Houghton		
2023	Oppenheimer	Katherine "Kitty" Oppenheimer		
2023	Pain Hustlers	Liza Drake	Also executive producer	
2024	The Fall Guy	Jody Moreno		
2024	IF	Uni	Voice	
2025	The Smashing Machine	Dawn Staples		
2026	The Devil Wears Prada 2	Emily Charlton		
2026	Disclosure Day	Margaret Fairchild		
2027	A Quiet Place Part III †	Evelyn Abbott	Filming	
TBA	Walk the Blue Fields †	Margaret Flusk	Post-production; Also producer	

== Television ==
Year	Title	Role	Notes	Ref
2003	Boudica	Isolda	Television film; aka Warrior Queen	
2003	Foyle's War	Lucy Markham	Episode: "War Games"	
2003	Henry VIII	Catherine Howard		
2004	Agatha Christie's Poirot	Linnet Ridgeway	Episode: "Death on the Nile"	
2005	Empire	Camane		
2005	The Strange Case of Sherlock Holmes & Arthur Conan Doyle	Jean Leckie	Television film	
2006	Gideon's Daughter	Natasha	Television film	
2009	The Simpsons	Juliet Hobbes	Episode: "Lisa the Drama Queen"; voice	
2015	Lip Sync Battle	Herself	Episode: "Emily Blunt vs. Anne Hathaway"	
2016	Saturday Night Live	Herself (host)	Episode: "Emily Blunt/Bruno Mars"	
2022	The English	Cornelia Locke	Also executive producer	
2024	Saturday Night Live	Herself	Episode: "Ryan Gosling/Chris Stapleton"	

== Stage ==
Year	Production	Role	Theater	Ref
2000	Bliss	Unknown	Edinburgh Fringe Festival	
2001–2002	The Royal Family	Gwen Cavendish	Theatre Royal Haymarket	
2002	Vincent in Brixton	Eugenie Loyer	Royal National Theatre	
2002	Romeo and Juliet	Juliet Capulet	Chichester Festival Theatre	

== Radio ==
Year	Title	Role	Ref
2004	Bumps and Bruises	Holly	

== Audiobook ==
Year	Title	Ref
2010	Sum: Forty Tales from the Afterlives	

== Web series ==
Year	Title	Role	Notes	Ref
2020	Some Good News	Herself	Episode 2	
2020	Some Good News	Herself	Episode 7	

== Discography ==
Soundtrack/Album	Year	Song	Label	Ref
Call Me Irresponsible	2007	"Me and Mrs. Jones"	Reprise Records	
Into the Woods	2014	"A Very Nice Prince"	Walt Disney Records	
Into the Woods	2014	"It Takes Two"	Walt Disney Records	
Into the Woods	2014	"Any Moment"	Walt Disney Records	
Into the Woods	2014	"Moments in the Woods"	Walt Disney Records	
Into the Woods	2014	"Finale/Children Will Listen (Part 1)"	Walt Disney Records	
My Little Pony: The Movie	2017	"Open Up Your Eyes"	Hasbro Studios	
Mary Poppins Returns	2018	"Can You Imagine That?"	Walt Disney Records	
Mary Poppins Returns	2018	"The Royal Doulton Music Hall"	Walt Disney Records	
Mary Poppins Returns	2018	"Introducing Mary Poppins"	Walt Disney Records	
Mary Poppins Returns	2018	"A Cover Is Not the Book"	Walt Disney Records	
Mary Poppins Returns	2018	"The Place Where Lost Things Go"	Walt Disney Records	
Mary Poppins Returns	2018	"Turning Turtle"	Walt Disney Records	
Mary Poppins Returns	2018	"Trip a Little Light Fantastic"	Walt Disney Records	
Mary Poppins Returns	2018	"Trip a Little Light Fantastic (reprise)"	Walt Disney Records	

== See also ==
- List of awards and nominations received by Emily Blunt
