= List of awards and nominations received by Emily Blunt =

Emily Blunt awards and nominations
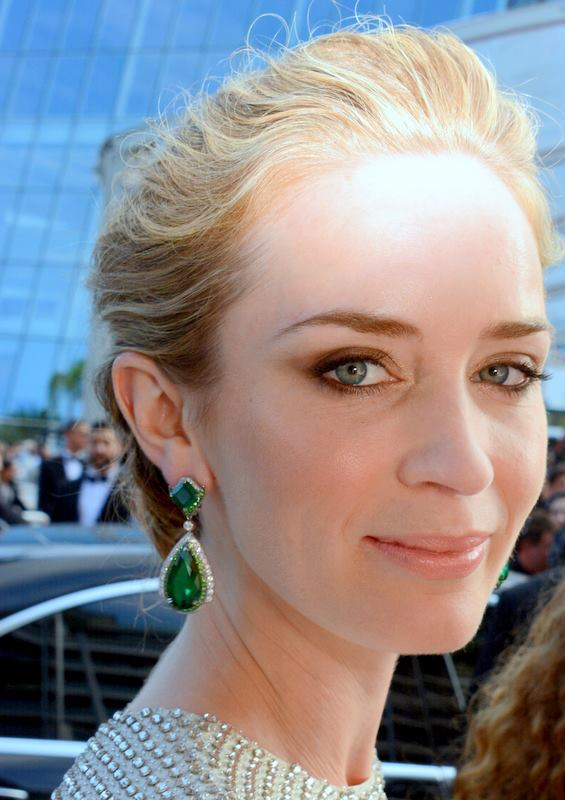
- Blunt at the 2015 Cannes Film Festival
Awards and nominations
| Award | Wins | Nominations |
| Academy Awards | 0 | 1 |
| Actor Awards | 2 | 6 |
| BAFTA Awards | 1 | 5 |
| Critics' Choice Awards | 3 | 9 |
| Golden Globe Awards | 1 | 8 |

Totals (Note: Certain award groups do not simply award one winner. They acknowledge several different recipients, have runners-up, and have third place. Since this is a specific recognition and is different from losing an award, runner-up mentions are considered wins in this award tally. For simplification and to avoid errors, each award in this list has been presumed to have had a prior nomination.)
- Wins: 31
- Nominations: 130

British actress Emily Blunt has received many awards and nominations for her work on screen. Among other accolades, she has won a Golden Globe Award, two Screen Actors Guild Awards, two Critics' Choice Movie Awards, and received nominations for an Academy Award and four British Academy Film Awards.

Blunt won the Golden Globe Award for Best Supporting Actress – Series, Miniseries or Television Film for her performance in the BBC drama film Gideon's Daughter (2006), and received nominations for her performances in the comedy-drama film The Devil Wears Prada (2006), the period drama The Young Victoria (2009), the romantic comedy-drama Salmon Fishing in the Yemen (2013), the musical fantasy films Into the Woods (2014), Mary Poppins Returns (2018), and the biographical thriller film Oppenheimer (2023).

She won the Screen Actors Guild Award for Outstanding Performance by a Female Actor in a Supporting Role for her performance in the horror film A Quiet Place (2018), and was also nominated for the psychological thriller The Girl on the Train (2016), Mary Poppins Returns, the revisionist western miniseries The English (2022), and Oppenheimer. She has also received four British Academy Film Award nominations for the BAFTA Rising Star Award, The Devil Wears Prada, The Girl on the Train, and Oppenheimer. In 2024, she received an Academy Award nomination for Best Supporting Actress for her performance in Oppenheimer.

== Major associations ==
=== Academy Awards ===
| Year | Category | Nominated work | Result | Ref. |
|---|---|---|---|---|
| 2024 | Best Supporting Actress | Oppenheimer | Nominated | |

=== Actor Awards ===
| Year | Category | Nominated work | Result | Ref. |
|---|---|---|---|---|
| 2017 | Outstanding Actress in a Leading Role | The Girl on the Train | Nominated | |
| 2019 | Outstanding Actress in a Leading Role | Mary Poppins Returns | Nominated | |
| 2019 | Outstanding Actress in a Supporting Role | A Quiet Place | Won | |
| 2023 | Outstanding Actress in a Miniseries or Television Movie | The English | Nominated | |
| 2024 | Outstanding Actress in a Supporting Role | Oppenheimer | Nominated | |
| 2024 | Outstanding Performance by a Cast in a Motion Picture | Oppenheimer | Won | |

=== BAFTA Awards ===
| Year | Category | Nominated work | Result | Ref. |
British Academy Film Awards
| 2007 | Best Actress in a Supporting Role | The Devil Wears Prada | Nominated | |
| 2007 | Rising Star Award | | Nominated | |
| 2017 | Best Actress in a Leading Role | The Girl on the Train | Nominated | |
| 2024 | Best Actress in a Supporting Role | Oppenheimer | Nominated | |
British Academy Britannia Awards
| 2009 | British Artist of the Year | —N/a | Won | |

=== Critics' Choice Awards ===
| Year | Category | Nominated work | Result | Ref. |
Critics' Choice Movie Awards
| 2010 | Best Actress | The Young Victoria | Nominated | |
| 2013 | Best Actress in an Action Movie | Looper | Nominated | |
| 2015 | Best Actress in an Action Movie | Edge of Tomorrow | Won | |
| 2016 | Best Actress in an Action Movie | Sicario | Nominated | |
| 2019 | Best Actress | Mary Poppins Returns | Nominated | |
| 2019 | Best Actress in a Comedy | Mary Poppins Returns | Nominated | |
| 2024 | Best Supporting Actress | Oppenheimer | Nominated | |
| 2024 | Best Acting Ensemble | Oppenheimer | Won | |
Critics' Choice Super Awards
| 2026 | Best Actress in a Science Fiction/Fantasy Movie | Disclosure Day | Won | |

=== Golden Globe Awards ===
| Year | Category | Nominated work | Result | Ref. |
|---|---|---|---|---|
| 2007 | Best Supporting Actress – Motion Picture | The Devil Wears Prada | Nominated | |
| 2007 | Best Supporting Actress – Television | Gideon's Daughter | Won | |
| 2010 | Best Actress in a Motion Picture – Drama | The Young Victoria | Nominated | |
| 2012 | Best Actress in a Motion Picture – Musical or Comedy | Salmon Fishing in the Yemen | Nominated | |
| 2015 | Best Actress in a Motion Picture – Musical or Comedy | Into the Woods | Nominated | |
| 2019 | Best Actress in a Motion Picture – Musical or Comedy | Mary Poppins Returns | Nominated | |
| 2024 | Best Supporting Actress – Motion Picture | Oppenheimer | Nominated | |
| 2026 | Best Supporting Actress – Motion Picture | The Smashing Machine | Nominated | |

== Other awards ==
| Organisation | Year (Note: The year in which the award was given) | Category | Work | Result | Ref. |
|---|---|---|---|---|---|
| AACTA Awards | 2016 | Best Actress | Sicario | Nominated | |
| AACTA Awards | 2019 | Best Supporting Actress | A Quiet Place | Nominated | |
| Alliance of Women Film Journalists | 2012 | Best Animated Female | Gnomeo & Juliet | Nominated | |
| Alliance of Women Film Journalists | 2015 | Most Egregious Age Difference Between the Leading Man and the Love Interest (shared with Tom Cruise) | Edge of Tomorrow | Nominated | |
| Alliance of Women Film Journalists | 2015 | Best Female Action Star | Edge of Tomorrow | Won | |
| Alliance of Women Film Journalists | 2016 | Best Female Action Star | Sicario | Nominated | |
| Astra Midseason Movie Awards | 2018 | Best Actress | A Quiet Place | Nominated | |
| Astra Midseason Movie Awards | 2021 | Best Supporting Actress | A Quiet Place Part II | Nominated | |
| Astra Midseason Movie Awards | 2024 | Best Actress | The Fall Guy | Nominated | |
| Astra Midseason Movie Awards | 2026 | Best Actress | Disclosure Day | Runner-up | |
| Astra Midseason Movie Awards | 2026 | Best Supporting Actress | The Devil Wears Prada 2 | Nominated | |
| Austin Film Critics Association | 2023 | Best Supporting Actress | Oppenheimer | Nominated | |
| British Independent Film Awards | 2004 | Most Promising Newcomer | My Summer of Love | Nominated | |
| British Independent Film Awards | 2009 | Best Actress | The Young Victoria | Nominated | |
| Capri Hollywood International Film Festival | 2023 | Best Ensemble Cast Award | Oppenheimer | Won | |
| Chicago Film Critics Association | 2012 | Best Supporting Actress | Looper | Nominated | |
| Dallas–Fort Worth Film Critics Association | 2006 | Best Supporting Actress | The Devil Wears Prada | Nominated | |
| Dallas–Fort Worth Film Critics Association | 2009 | Best Actress | The Young Victoria | Nominated | |
| Dallas–Fort Worth Film Critics Association | 2023 | Best Supporting Actress | Oppenheimer | Nominated | |
| Detroit Film Critics Society | 2014 | Best Ensemble | Into the Woods | Nominated | |
| Dublin Film Critics' Circle | 2015 | Best Actress | Sicario | Nominated | |
| Empire Awards | 2010 | Best Actress | The Young Victoria | Nominated | |
| Empire Awards | 2015 | Best Actress | Edge of Tomorrow | Nominated | |
| Empire Awards | 2016 | Best Actress | Sicario | Nominated | |
| Evening Standard British Film Awards | 2005 | Most Promising Newcomer | My Summer of Love | Won | |
| Evening Standard British Film Awards | 2016 | Best Actress | Sicario | Nominated | |
| Fangoria Chainsaw Awards | 2019 | Best Actress | A Quiet Place | Nominated | |
| Florida Film Critics Circle | 2023 | Best Supporting Actress | Oppenheimer | Nominated | |
| Georgia Film Critics Association | 2013 | Best Supporting Actress | Looper | Nominated | |
| Georgia Film Critics Association | 2016 | Best Actress | Sicario | Nominated | |
| Georgia Film Critics Association | 2023 | Best Supporting Actress | Oppenheimer | Runner-up | |
| Golden Schmoes Awards | 2006 | Best Supporting Actress | The Devil Wears Prada | Nominated | |
| Golden Schmoes Awards | 2012 | Best Supporting Actress | Looper | Nominated | |
| Golden Schmoes Awards | 2014 | Best T&A of the Year | Edge of Tomorrow | Nominated | |
| Golden Schmoes Awards | 2015 | Best Actress of the Year | Sicario | Nominated | |
| Golden Schmoes Awards | 2018 | Best Actress of the Year | Mary Poppins Returns | Nominated | |
| Golden Schmoes Awards | 2018 | Best Supporting Actress | A Quiet Place | Won | |
| Golden Schmoes Awards | 2018 | Favourite Celebrity of the Year | —N/a | Nominated | |
| Gotham Awards | 2012 | Best Ensemble Cast (shared with Rosemarie DeWitt and Mark Duplass) | Your Sister's Sister | Won | |
| Gotham Awards | 2023 | Breakthrough Series – Long Form (executive producer) | The English | Nominated | |
| Harper's Bazaar Women of the Year Awards | 2012 | British Actor of the Year | —N/a | Won | |
| Houston Film Critics Society Awards | 2016 | Best Actress | Sicario | Nominated | |
| Houston Film Critics Society Awards | 2023 | Best Supporting Actress | Oppenheimer | Nominated | |
| IGN Summer Movie Awards | 2018 | Best Lead Performance in a Movie | Mary Poppins Returns | Nominated | |
| Jupiter Awards | 2011 | Best International Actress | The Young Victoria | Won | |
| Jupiter Awards | 2016 | Best International Actress | Sicario | Nominated | |
| Kansas City Film Critics Circle | 2015 | Best Actress | Sicario | Nominated | |
| London Film Critics' Circle | 2005 | British Newcomer of the Year | My Summer of Love | Nominated | |
| London Film Critics' Circle | 2007 | British Supporting Actress of the Year | The Devil Wears Prada | Won | |
| London Film Critics' Circle | 2010 | British Actress of the Year | The Young Victoria | Nominated | |
| London Film Critics' Circle | 2010 | British Supporting Actress of the Year | Sunshine Cleaning | Nominated | |
| London Film Critics' Circle | 2013 | British Actress of the Year | Looper and Your Sister's Sister | Nominated | |
| London Film Critics' Circle | 2015 | British Actress of the Year | Into the Woods and Edge of Tomorrow | Nominated | |
| London Film Critics' Circle | 2016 | British/Irish Actress of the Year | Sicario | Nominated | |
| London Film Critics' Circle | 2019 | British/Irish Actress of the Year | Mary Poppins Returns, A Quiet Place and Sherlock Gnomes | Nominated | |
| Motovun Film Festival | 2005 | Special Jury Prize (shared with Natalie Press) | My Summer of Love | Won | |
| MTV Movie & TV Awards | 2007 | Best Breakthrough Performance | The Devil Wears Prada | Nominated | |
| MTV Movie & TV Awards | 2007 | Best Comedic Performance | The Devil Wears Prada | Nominated | |
| MTV Movie & TV Awards | 2018 | Best Frightened Performance | A Quiet Place | Nominated | |
| Nickelodeon Kids' Choice Awards | 2017 | Favourite Frenemies (shared with Charlize Theron) | The Huntsman: Winter's War | Nominated | |
| Nickelodeon Kids' Choice Awards | 2019 | Favorite Movie Actress | Mary Poppins Returns | Nominated | |
| Nickelodeon Kids' Choice Awards | 2023 | Favorite Movie Actress | Jungle Cruise | Nominated | |
| Online Film Critics Society | 2024 | Best Supporting Actress | Oppenheimer | Nominated | |
| Palm Springs International Film Festival | 2019 | Ensemble Cast | Mary Poppins Returns | Won | |
| People's Choice Awards | 2013 | Favourite Comedic Movie Actress | —N/a | Nominated | |
| People's Choice Awards | 2016 | Favourite Action Movie Actress | —N/a | Nominated | |
| People's Choice Awards | 2017 | Favourite Dramatic Movie Actress | —N/a | Nominated | |
| People's Choice Awards | 2018 | The Drama Movie Star of 2018 | A Quiet Place | Nominated | |
| People's Choice Awards | 2021 | The Drama Movie Star of 2021 | A Quiet Place Part II | Nominated | |
| People's Choice Awards | 2021 | The Comedy Movie Star of 2021 | Jungle Cruise | Nominated | |
| San Francisco Bay Area Film Critics Circle | 2024 | Best Supporting Actress | Oppenheimer | Nominated | |
| Santa Barbara International Film Festival | 2010 | Virtuoso Award | The Young Victoria | Won | |
| Santa Barbara International Film Festival | 2027 | Kirk Douglas Award | For Excellence in Film | Won | |
| Satellite Awards | 2009 | Best Actress – Motion Picture Drama | The Young Victoria | Nominated | |
| Satellite Awards | 2009 | Best Supporting Actress – Motion Picture | Sunshine Cleaning | Nominated | |
| Satellite Awards | 2015 | Best Ensemble – Motion Picture | Into the Woods | Won | |
| Satellite Awards | 2019 | Best Actress in a Motion Picture, Musical or Comedy | Mary Poppins Returns | Nominated | |
| Satellite Awards | 2024 | Best Supporting Actress - Motion Picture | Oppenheimer | Nominated | |
| Satellite Awards | 2024 | Best Ensemble – Motion Picture | Oppenheimer | Won | |
| Saturn Awards | 2012 | Best Supporting Actress | The Adjustment Bureau | Won | |
| Saturn Awards | 2015 | Best Actress | Edge of Tomorrow | Nominated | |
| Saturn Awards | 2016 | Best Actress | Sicario | Nominated | |
| Saturn Awards | 2017 | Best Actress | The Girl on the Train | Nominated | |
| Saturn Awards | 2019 | Best Actress | Mary Poppins Returns | Nominated | |
| Saturn Awards | 2022 | Best Actress | A Quiet Place Part II | Nominated | |
| Saturn Awards | 2023 | Best Supporting Actress | Oppenheimer | Won | |
| Scream Awards | 2010 | Best Horror Actress | The Wolfman | Nominated | |
| St. Louis Film Critics Association | 2018 | Best Supporting Actress | A Quiet Place | Nominated | |
| St. Louis Film Critics Association | 2023 | Best Supporting Actress | Oppenheimer | Nominated | |
| Teen Choice Awards | 2006 | Choice Movie: Female Breakout Star | The Devil Wears Prada | Nominated | |
| Teen Choice Awards | 2014 | Choice Movie Actress: Action | Edge of Tomorrow | Nominated | |
| Teen Choice Awards | 2019 | Choice Sci-Fi/Fantasy Movie Actress | Mary Poppins Returns | Nominated | |
| Vancouver Film Critics Circle | 2010 | Best Actress in a Canadian Film | The Young Victoria | Won | |
| Vancouver Film Critics Circle | 2024 | Best Supporting Actress | Oppenheimer | Nominated | |
| Washington D.C. Area Film Critics Association | 2014 | Best Ensemble | Into the Woods | Nominated | |
| Washington D.C. Area Film Critics Association | 2023 | Best Supporting Actress | Oppenheimer | Nominated | |
| Washington D.C. Area Film Critics Association | 2023 | Best Ensemble | Oppenheimer | Won | |

== Honorary awards ==
| Year | Organisation | Category | Result | Ref. |
|---|---|---|---|---|
| 2007 | Women in Film Crystal + Lucy Awards | MaxMara Face of the Future | Honoured | |
| 2010 | Costume Designers Guild | Swarovski Award | Honoured | |
| 2018 | Savannah Film Festival | Icon Award | Honoured | |
| 2018 | Variety's Power of Women | Honoree | Honoured | |
| 2023 | Variety's Power of Women | Alumni Award | Honoured | |

== See also ==
- List of Emily Blunt performances
