= Bjoern Rehbein =

German-American hairstylist and make-up artist

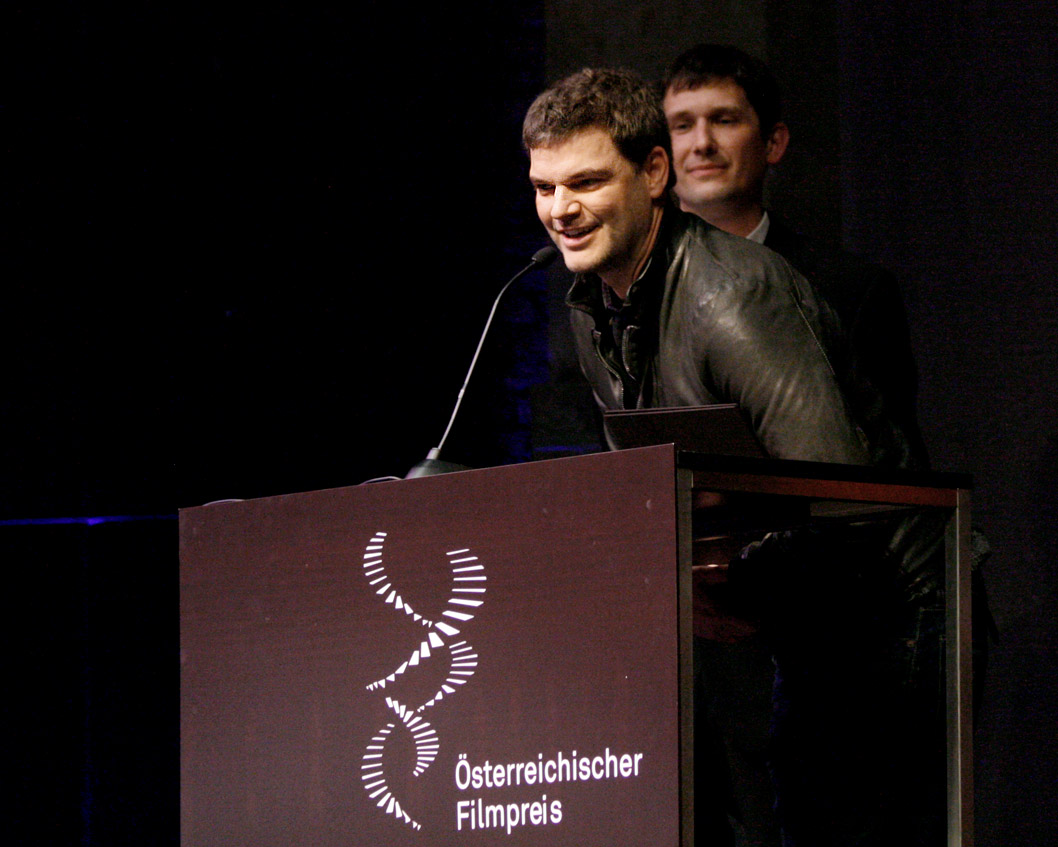
- Rehbein in 2011
- Occupations: Hairstylist, make-up artist

Bjoern Rehbein, also known as Björn Rehbein, is a German-American hairstylist and make-up artist. He was nominated for an Academy Award in the category Best Makeup and Hairstyling for the film The Smashing Machine.

In addition to his Academy Award nomination, he was nominated for a Primetime Emmy Award in the category Outstanding Makeup for his work on the television program The Wiz Live!. His nomination was shared with Cookie Jordan, Matiki Anoff, Debi Young, Stephanie McGee and Christine Domaniecki.

== Selected filmography ==
- The Smashing Machine (2025; co-nominated with Kazu Hiro and Glen P. Griffin)
