= Glen P. Griffin =

American make-up and special effects artist

- Occupations: Make-up and special effects artist

Glen P. Griffin is an American make-up and special effects artist. He was nominated for an Academy Award in the category Best Makeup and Hairstyling for the film The Smashing Machine.

== Selected filmography ==
- The Smashing Machine (2025; co-nominated with Kazu Hiro and Bjoern Rehbein)
