= Into the Woods (soundtrack) =

Into the Woods (Original Motion Picture Soundtrack)

Soundtrack album by Various artists
- Released: December 16, 2014
- Recorded: August 2013–14
- Studios: Angel Recording Studios, London; Air Lyndhurst Studios, London; British Grove Studios, London
- Genre: Film soundtrack
- Length: 59:37
- Label: Walt Disney
- Producers: Mike Higham; Rob Marshall; John DeLuca

Into the Woods is the soundtrack album to the 2014 Walt Disney Pictures musical fantasy film of the same name. The album features music written and composed by Stephen Sondheim, and featuring vocals from the film's ensemble cast including Meryl Streep, Emily Blunt, James Corden, Anna Kendrick, Chris Pine, Johnny Depp, Daniel Huttlestone, Lilla Crawford, MacKenzie Mauzy, Tracey Ullman, Christine Baranski, Tammy Blanchard, and Lucy Punch.

Two editions of the soundtrack were released by Walt Disney Records on December 16, 2014: a single-disc traditional edition, and a two-disc digipak deluxe edition. Walt Disney Records subsequently released an instrumental version of the soundtrack on January 15, 2015.

== Background ==
Stephen Sondheim had written a new song for the film, titled "She'll Be Back," written specifically for The Witch. "It was beautiful and spectacular, but it was very clear, as good as the song was, that [the movie] was stronger without.", director Rob Marshall proclaimed. "Rainbows," a song originally written for a film adaption of Into the Woods in the 1990s, was reportedly to be included, although Marshall denied such a claim.

Paul Gemignani and Jonathan Tunick, who conducted and orchestrated (respectively) the original Broadway stage show, returned to conduct and orchestrate the music for the film at Angel Recording Studios in London, with the cast's vocals being recorded separately.

== Track listing ==
All tracks are written by Stephen Sondheim.

Into the Woods (Original Motion Picture Soundtrack – Two-Disc Deluxe Edition) (disc 1)
No.	Title	Performer(s)	Length
1.	"Prologue: Into the Woods"	Company of Into the Woods	14:35
2.	"Cinderella at the Grave"	Joanna Riding	1:41
3.	"Hello, Little Girl"	Johnny Depp and Lilla Crawford	2:32
4.	"Rapunzel's Song"	MacKenzie Mauzy	0:56
5.	"The Cape as Red as Blood"	Stephen Sondheim	0:42
6.	"The Cow as White as Milk"	Emily Blunt and James Corden	0:30
7.	"Magic Beans"	Stephen Sondheim	1:27
8.	"Rapunzel's Hair"	Stephen Sondheim	1:24
9.	"Granny's Cottage"	Stephen Sondheim	1:37
10.	"I Know Things Now"	Lilla Crawford	2:05
11.	"The Beanstalk Grows"	Stephen Sondheim	2:05
12.	"Cinderella Runs"	Stephen Sondheim	0:54
13.	"A Very Nice Prince"	Anna Kendrick and Emily Blunt	1:32
14.	"Giants in the Sky"	Daniel Huttlestone	2:27
15.	"'Who Cares!'"	Stephen Sondheim	0:31
16.	"Baker and Wife Part"	Stephen Sondheim	0:34
17.	"Princes' Fanfare"	Stephen Sondheim	0:17
18.	"Agony"	Chris Pine and Billy Magnussen	2:33
19.	"The Forbidden Tower"	Stephen Sondheim	2:20
20.	"'May I Compare This Ear of Corn?'"	Christophe Beck	1:44
21.	"It Takes Two"	Emily Blunt and James Corden	2:31
22.	"Two Midnights Gone"	Stephen Sondheim	0:35
23.	"One Day Left"	Stephen Sondheim	0:59
24.	"Stay with Me"	Meryl Streep	3:15
25.	"Jack Chops Down the Beanstalk"	Stephen Sondheim	1:23
26.	"On the Steps of the Palace"	Anna Kendrick	3:15
27.	"'She Won't Go Far with One Shoe'"	Stephen Sondheim	0:59
28.	"Searching for Cinderella"	Stephen Sondheim	1:06
29.	"Careful My Toe"	Christine Baranski, Tammy Blanchard, and Lucy Punch	1:11
30.	"The Slipper Fits"	Stephen Sondheim	1:13
31.	"Rapunzel's Tear"	Stephen Sondheim	1:20
32.	"'This Cow Is Covered with Flour'"	Stephen Sondheim	0:50
33.	"Almost Midnight"	Stephen Sondheim	1:08
34.	"The Witch's Transformation"	Stephen Sondheim	1:35
Total length:			61:31

Into the Woods (Original Motion Picture Soundtrack – Two-Disc Deluxe Edition) (disc 2)
No.	Title	Artist(s)	Length
35.	"Ever After" (Instrumental)	Stephen Sondheim	1:16
36.	"Back into the Woods"	Stephen Sondheim	0:51
37.	"Find the Boy"	Stephen Sondheim	1:32
38.	"Witch's Lament"	Meryl Streep	1:16
39.	"Any Moment"	Chris Pine and Emily Blunt	1:42
40.	"Moments in the Woods"	Emily Blunt	3:09
41.	"Your Fault"	Daniel Huttlestone, James Corden, Lilla Crawford, Meryl Streep and Anna Kendrick	1:57
42.	"Last Midnight"	Meryl Streep	3:35
43.	"No More" (Instrumental)	Stephen Sondheim	2:38
44.	"The Far Away Prince"	Stephen Sondheim	1:06
45.	"No One Is Alone"	Anna Kendrick, James Corden, Lilla Crawford and Daniel Huttlestone	2:59
46.	"The Giant Attack"	Stephen Sondheim	2:13
47.	"Finale/Children Will Listen (Part 1)"	James Corden, Emily Blunt, Meryl Streep, and Cast	3:32
48.	"Finale/Children Will Listen (Part 2)"	Company	1:46
49.	"Stay with Me" (Instrumental)	Stephen Sondheim	2:39
50.	"Last Midnight" (Instrumental)	Stephen Sondheim	3:47
Total length:			36:00

Into the Woods (Original Motion Picture Soundtrack – One-Disc Edition)
No.	Title	Performer(s)	Length
1.	"Prologue: Into the Woods"	Company of Into the Woods	14:35
2.	"Cinderella at the Grave"	Joanna Riding	1:41
3.	"Hello, Little Girl"	Johnny Depp and Lilla Crawford	2:32
4.	"I Know Things Now"	Lilla Crawford	2:05
5.	"A Very Nice Prince"	Anna Kendrick and Emily Blunt	1:30
6.	"Giants in the Sky"	Daniel Huttlestone	2:26
7.	"Agony"	Chris Pine and Billy Magnussen	2:32
8.	"It Takes Two"	Emily Blunt and James Corden	2:30
9.	"Stay with Me"	Meryl Streep	3:14
10.	"On the Steps of the Palace"	Anna Kendrick	3:14
11.	"Careful My Toe"	Christine Baranski, Tammy Blanchard, and Lucy Punch	1:11
12.	"Ever After" (Instrumental)	Stephen Sondheim	1:16
13.	"Witch's Lament"	Meryl Streep	1:15
14.	"Any Moment"	Chris Pine and Emily Blunt	1:41
15.	"Moments in the Woods"	Emily Blunt	3:08
16.	"Your Fault"	Daniel Huttlestone, James Corden, Lilla Crawford, Meryl Streep, and Anna Kendrick	1:57
17.	"Last Midnight"	Meryl Streep	3:35
18.	"No One Is Alone"	Anna Kendrick, James Corden, Lilla Crawford, and Daniel Huttlestone	2:58
19.	"Finale/Children Will Listen (Part 1)"	James Corden, Emily Blunt, Meryl Streep, and Cast	3:31
20.	"Finale/Children Will Listen (Part 2)"	Company	1:43
Total length:			58:34

Disney Movie Rewards Bonus Track
No.	Title	Performer(s)	Length
21.	"She'll Be Back (Deleted Song)"	Meryl Streep	3:08
Total length:			3:08

Into the Woods (Instrumental Songs Version)
No.	Title	Performer(s)	Length
1.	"Prologue: Into the Woods" (Instrumental)	Stephen Sondheim	14:29
2.	"Cinderella at the Grave" (Instrumental)	Stephen Sondheim	1:41
3.	"Hello, Little Girl" (Instrumental)	Stephen Sondheim	2:30
4.	"I Know Things Now" (Instrumental)	Stephen Sondheim	2:05
5.	"A Very Nice Prince" (Instrumental)	Stephen Sondheim	1:30
6.	"Giants in the Sky" (Instrumental)	Stephen Sondheim	2:27
7.	"Agony" (Instrumental)	Stephen Sondheim	2:30
8.	"It Takes Two" (Instrumental)	Stephen Sondheim	2:30
9.	"Stay with Me" (Instrumental)	Stephen Sondheim	3:14
10.	"On the Steps of the Palace" (Instrumental)	Stephen Sondheim	3:14
11.	"Careful My Toe" (Instrumental)	Stephen Sondheim	1:11
12.	"Witch's Lament" (Instrumental)	Stephen Sondheim	1:14
13.	"Any Moment" (Instrumental)	Stephen Sondheim	1:40
14.	"Moments in the Woods" (Instrumental)	Stephen Sondheim	3:07
15.	"Your Fault" (Instrumental)	Stephen Sondheim	1:57
16.	"Last Midnight" (Instrumental)	Stephen Sondheim	3:33
17.	"No One Is Alone" (Instrumental)	Stephen Sondheim	2:58
18.	"Finale/Children Will Listen (Part 1)" (Instrumental)	Stephen Sondheim	3:31
19.	"Finale/Children Will Listen (Part 2)" (Instrumental)	Stephen Sondheim	1:45
Total length:			55:52

== Personnel ==
- Jonathan Tunick – orchestrator
- Paul Gemignani – music supervisor, conductor
- Jim Bruening – assistant music editor
- Jennifer Dunnington – music editor
- Mike Higham – music supervisor
- Jo Changer – orchestra contractor
- Isobel Griffiths – orchestra contractor
- Rolf Wilson – orchestra leader
- Marc Platt – executive producer
- Mitchell Leib – executive in charge of music
- Scott Holtzman – music business affairs
- Don Welty – music business affairs
- Joshua Thomas – assistant engineer
- Jason Elliott – assistant engineer
- Fred Sladkey – assistant engineer
- Anabel Sinn – art direction

== Charts ==
=== Weekly charts ===
Chart (2014–15)	Peak position
Australian Albums (ARIA)	13
Belgian Albums (Ultratop Flanders)	123
US Billboard 200	8
US Soundtrack Albums (Billboard)	2

=== Year-end charts ===
Chart (2015)	Position
US Billboard 200	134
US Soundtrack Albums (Billboard)	7
