= Adjustment Team =

1954 short story by Philip K. Dick

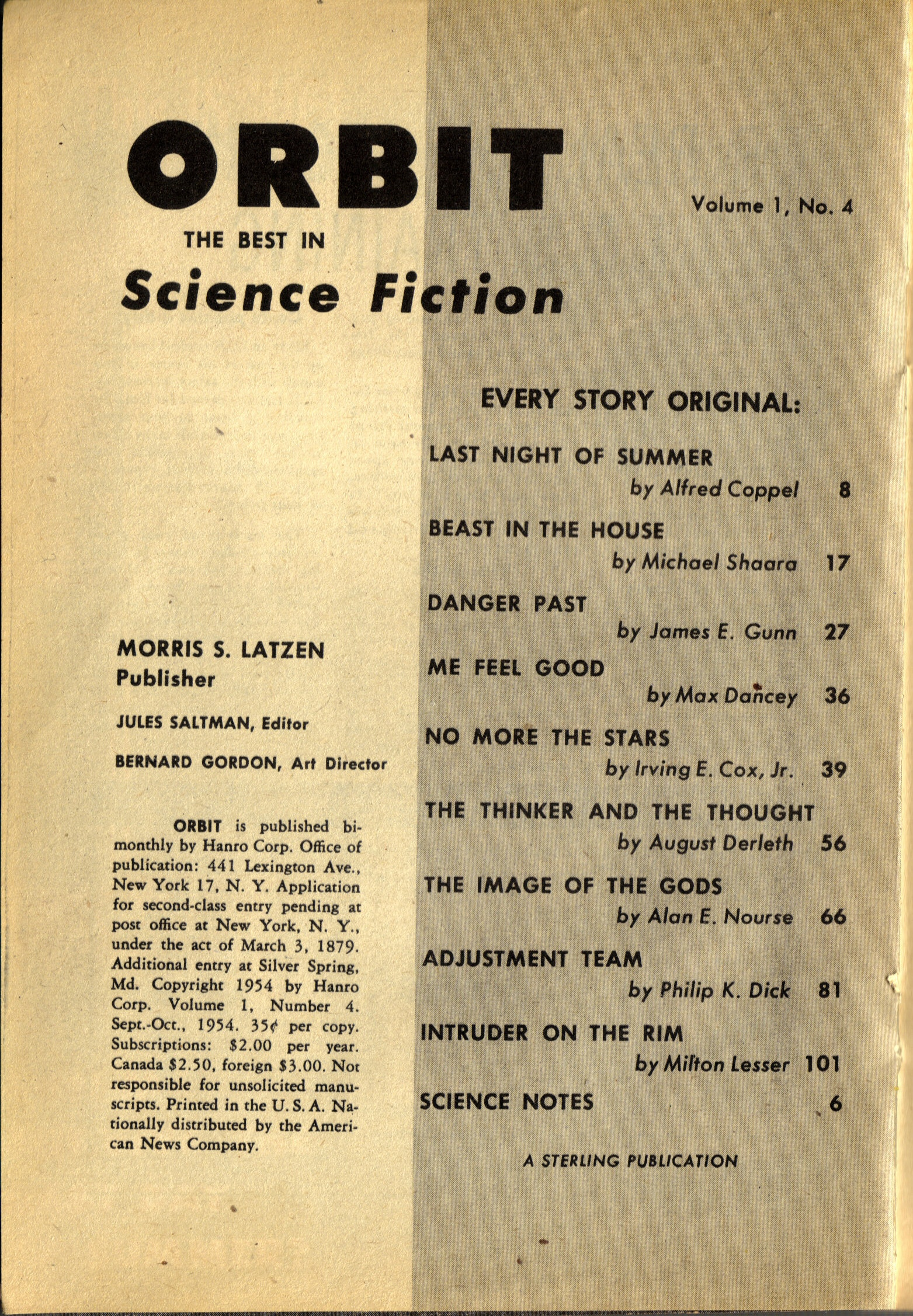
Index of the 1954 penultimate issue of Orbit Science Fiction

"Adjustment Team" is a 1954 science fiction novelette by American writer Philip K. Dick. It was first published in Orbit Science Fiction (September–October 1954, No. 4) with illustration by Faragasso. It was later reprinted in The Sands of Mars and Other Stories (Australian) in 1958, The Book of Philip K. Dick in 1973, The Turning Wheel and Other Stories (United Kingdom) in 1977, The Collected Stories of Philip K. Dick in 1987 (Underwood–Miller), 1988 (Gollancz, United Kingdom), 1990 (Citadel Twilight, United States), Selected Stories of Philip K. Dick in 2002 and in The Early Work of Philip K. Dick, Volume One: The Variable Man & Other Stories in 2009.

"Adjustment Team" served as the basis for the 2011 film The Adjustment Bureau.

== Synopsis ==
A man called the Clerk approaches a talking dog, and explains in businesslike manner that "Sector T137" is scheduled for "adjustment" at 9:00. He instructs the dog to bark at exactly 8:15, which the Clerk explains will summon "A Friend with a Car", who will take real estate agent Ed Fletcher to work before 9:00, but while the Clerk is preoccupied, the dog falls asleep and as a result barks a minute too late. Inside Ed's house, while he is getting ready for work, Ed is accosted by a door-to-door insurance salesman and is further delayed until 9:30. Ed arrives at his office building, but upon stepping onto the curb, he finds himself in a frozen, sunless, monochromatic version of the world where everything crumbles at his touch. Ed is accosted by white-robed men, who discuss "de-energizing" him with a hose-like apparatus, but he flees across the street and returns to the normal world.

The Clerk is brought to the top-level Administrative Chambers to explain what went wrong to someone referred to only as "the Old Man", who decides to personally deal with this unusual situation and orders Ed "brought up here". Meanwhile, a horrified Ed alerts his wife Ruth about his experience, and she accompanies him to his workplace to prove he has not experienced a full psychotic break or seen behind the fabric of reality, as he still fears. Things seem normal at first, and Ruth leaves, but Ed soon realizes people and objects have changed in their appearance, location, age, and countless other subtle differences. Panic-stricken, Ed runs to a phone booth to call the police, but it ascends into the sky with him inside.

Ed meets the Old Man, who explains he is not dead, but only visiting. The Old Man tells him that a serious error was made, what he experienced was a correction regarding said error, Ed himself was not changed, and his attempts at alerting others is a grave threat, explaining, "the natural process must be supplemented—adjusted here and there. Corrections must be made. We are fully licensed to make such corrections. Our adjustment teams perform vital work." In this instance, the adjustment is to bring about a chain of events that will reduce Cold War tensions. Ed is allowed to return without being de-energized and adjusted, on the condition that he tells no one about what he saw and convinces his wife he was merely suffering from a psychotic break. The Old Man threatens him that should he fail doing so, he will have a terrible fate when they meet again, and adds that every person eventually meets the Old Man.

On Ed's return, Ruth catches him lying about where he spent the afternoon and demands he tell her the truth, while he tries to stall her long enough to come up with a story she will believe. A bark is heard and a vacuum cleaner salesman rings the doorbell. While Ruth is distracted by the salesman's demonstration, Ed escapes to the bedroom, where he shakily lights a cigarette and gratefully looks up, saying, "Thanks ... I think we'll make it—after all. Thanks a lot."

== Critical commentary ==
Richard Mullen, the founder of the journal Science Fiction Studies, described the story as Dick's "first tentative try" at Frederik Pohl's "tunnel under the world" theme, in which it is imagined that mundane existence is totally a product of unseen manipulators. However, Mullen may have inadvertently reversed the relationship, considering that Dick published his story first, in September 1954, followed by Pohl's in January 1955. In Philip K. Dick and Philosophy, one critic saw the story as underscoring Dick's lifelong artistic concerns with "ethics, existentialism, and philosophy", saying that the story (and the film loosely based on it) were ultimately "about how to live".

== See also ==
- "Gabe's Story", a Twilight Zone episode
