= Kazu Hiro =

American special make-up effects artist and visual artist

- Born: Kazuhiro Tsuji; May 26, 1969 (age 57); Kyoto, Japan
- Occupations: Portrait sculptor, special make-up effects artist
- Years active: 1988–present

Kazu Hiro (born Kazuhiro Tsuji, Japanese: 辻 一弘 Tsuji Kazuhiro; born May 26, 1969) is a Japanese and American special make-up effects artist and visual artist. He won the Academy Award for Best Makeup and Hairstyling for the biographical films Darkest Hour (2017) and Bombshell (2019) after earning nominations for the comedies Click (2006) and Norbit (2007). He was additionally nominated for Maestro (2023) and The Smashing Machine (2025).

== Life and career ==
Kazu Hiro grew up in Kyoto, where he spent much of his time alone engaging in art projects. Kazu Hiro came across an issue of Fangoria which featured Dick Smith and his work turning Hal Holbrook into Abraham Lincoln for the 1976 miniseries Lincoln. This led to Kazu Hiro's own experiments with special make-up effects, photos of which he began sending to Dick Smith after discovering his P.O. box in the back of a magazine. The two would eventually meet in person when Smith traveled to Japan to work on Kiyoshi Kurosawa's Sweet Home. Smith invited Kazu Hiro to work on the film with him and this began his film career.

While working on Sweet Home, Kazu Hiro met fellow artist Eddie Yang, who was visiting from the United States. In 1996, Kazu Hiro moved to Los Angeles to work with Yang and Smith's protege, Rick Baker, on his first U.S. work, Men in Black. Continuing his work with Baker, Kazu Hiro worked on many projects including How the Grinch Stole Christmas, for which he won a BAFTA.

Kazu Hiro crafted the silicone model of Brad Pitt's head used to artificially age him via CGI for The Curious Case of Benjamin Button in 2008. In 2012, Kazu Hiro created the prosthetics which turned Joseph Gordon-Levitt into a young Bruce Willis for Looper.

After his work on Looper, Kazu Hiro retired from the film industry and focused on sculpture, crafting giant busts of people such as Frida Kahlo, Salvador Dalí, and Abraham Lincoln, as well as Smith.

For the 2017 film Darkest Hour, Gary Oldman talked Kazu Hiro out of retirement to create the Winston Churchill prosthetics. Oldman had been considered for the role of General Thade in Tim Burton's Planet of the Apes (the role went to his Rosencrantz & Guildenstern Are Dead co-star, Tim Roth) and Kazu Hiro's work at that time had impressed Oldman enough that for him, Kazu Hiro was the only man to turn him into Churchill. For this work, Kazu Hiro won the Academy Award for Best Makeup and Hairstyling in 2018, making him the first Asian to win that award.

He won the award again in 2020 for his work in the 2019 film Bombshell, where he made prosthetics for Charlize Theron as news anchor Megyn Kelly.

In 2024, Hiro received an Academy Award nomination for Best Makeup and Hairstyling for his work with Maestro. In January 2026, he received his most recent Academy Award nomination for Best Makeup and Hairstyling for his work with The Smashing Machine. His nomination was shared with Glen Griffin and Bjoern Rehbein.

== Personal life ==
In March 2019, Tsuji became an American citizen and officially changed his name to Kazu Hiro. At the 2020 Academy Awards, Kazu Hiro said he became an American citizen because he "got tired" of Japanese culture, which he found "too submissive" and a place where it is "hard to make a dream come true".

== Filmography ==
Year	Title	Designation
1989	Sweet Home	Special makeup effects artist
1991	Rhapsody in August	Special makeup effects artist
1992	Minbo	Special makeup effects artist
1997	Men in Black	Sculptor
1997	Critical Care	Makeup application: Albert Brooks
1997	The Devil's Advocate	Principal artist
2000	Nutty Professor II: The Klumps	Sculptor
1999	Life	Key makeup artist
1999	Wild Wild West	Makeup designer
2000	How the Grinch Stole Christmas	Makeup artist: Jim Carrey as Grinch
2001	Planet of the Apes	Designer/sculptor: Cinovation Studios/ makeup designer: Tim Roth as General Thade/makeup designer: ape makeup
2002	Men in Black II	Special makeup effects artist
2003	The Haunted Mansion	Special makeup effects artist
2004	Hellboy	Special makeup effects artist
2004	Blade: Trinity	Art supervisor
2005	The Ring Two	Makeup effects supervisor
2006	Click	Prosthetic makeup supervisor
2007	Norbit	Prosthetic makeup supervisor
2008	The Curious Case of Benjamin Button	Special makeup effects artist
2009	Angels & Demons	Prosthetic makeup artist
2009	Transformers: Revenge of the Fallen	Special makeup effects artist
2009	G.I. Joe: The Rise of Cobra	Prosthetic makeup designer: "The Doctor"
2010	Salt	Prosthetic makeup designer: Angelina Jolie
2010	Tron: Legacy	Special makeup effects artist
2012	Hemingway & Gellhorn	Special effects makeup artist: Nicole Kidman
2012	Total Recall	Special makeup effects artist
2012	Looper	Prosthetic makeup designer: Joseph Gordon-Levitt
2012	The Place Beyond the Pines	Prosthetic makeup crew
2017	Darkest Hour	Prosthetic makeup and hair designer: Gary Oldman as Winston Churchill
2019	Bombshell	Prosthetic makeup and hair designer: Charlize Theron as Megyn Kelly, John Lithgow as Roger Ailes
2023	Maestro	Prosthetic makeup and hair designer: Bradley Cooper as Leonard Bernstein
2025	The Smashing Machine	Prosthetic makeup and hair designer: Dwayne Johnson as Mark Kerr
2026	Digger	Prosthetic makeup and hair designer: Tom Cruise as Digger Rockwell and Curtis Markson

== Awards and nominations ==
Year	Award	Category	Nominated work	Result	Ref.
2007	Academy Award	Best Makeup & Hairstyling	Click	Nominated	
2008	Academy Award	Best Makeup & Hairstyling	Norbit	Nominated	
2018	Academy Award	Best Makeup & Hairstyling	Darkest Hour	Won	
2020	Academy Award	Best Makeup & Hairstyling	Bombshell	Won	
2024	Academy Award	Best Makeup & Hairstyling	Maestro	Nominated	
2026	Academy Award	Best Makeup & Hairstyling	The Smashing Machine	Nominated	
2022	Primetime Emmy Award	Outstanding Prosthetic Makeup	Gaslit: Final Days	Nominated	
2024	Santa Barbara International Film Festival	Variety Artisans Award – Hairstyling/Makeup	Maestro	Honored	
