= Emily Blunt =

British actress (born 1983)

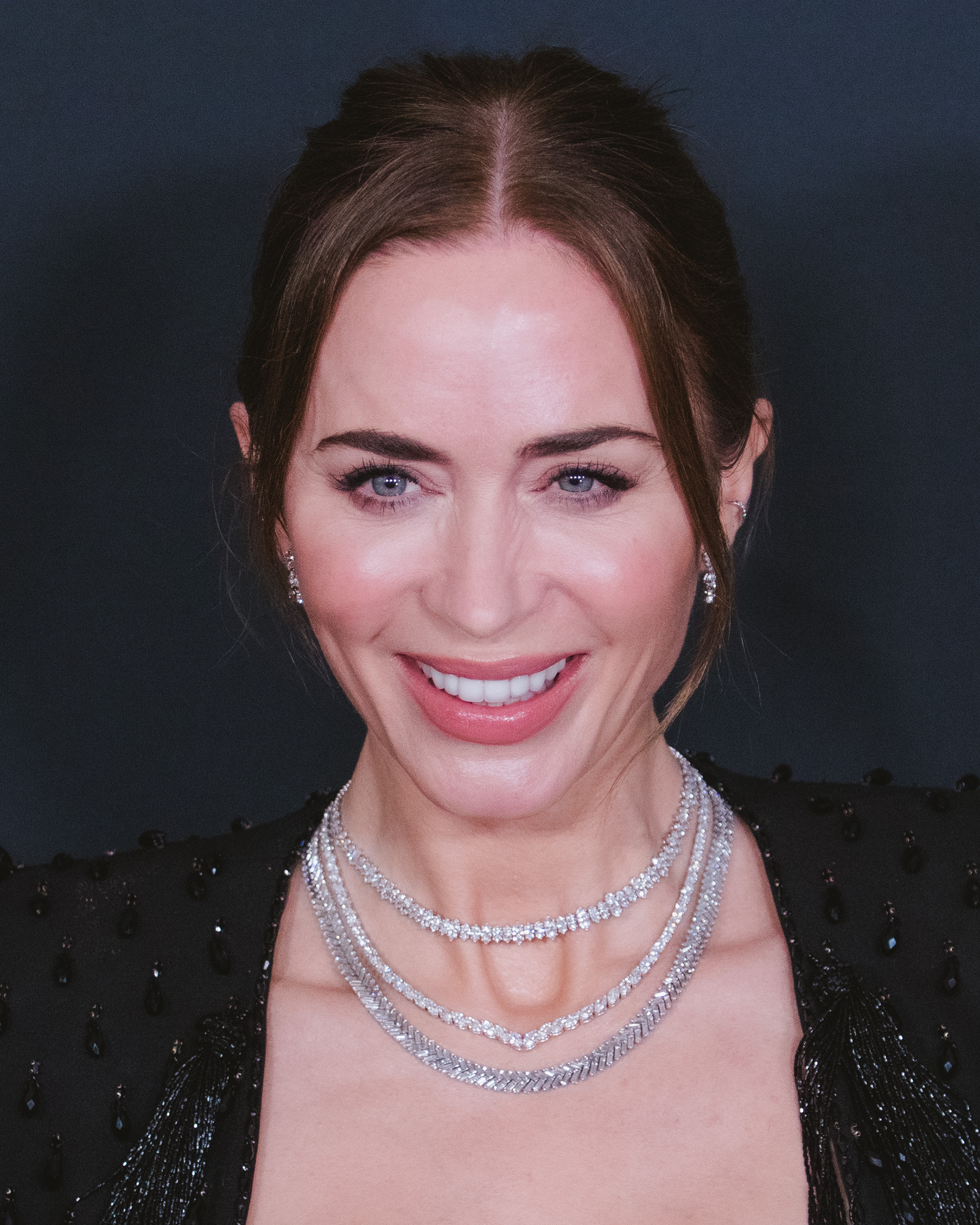
- Blunt in 2026
- Born: Emily Olivia Laura Blunt; 23 February 1983 (age 43); London, England
- Citizenship: United Kingdom; United States
- Occupation: Actress
- Years active: 2001–present
- Works: Full list
- Spouse: John Krasinski (m. 2010)
- Children: 2
- Relatives: Crispin Blunt (uncle)
- Awards: Full list

Emily Olivia Laura Blunt (born 23 February 1983) is a British actress. She is the recipient of various accolades, including a Golden Globe Award and two Actor Awards, in addition to nominations for an Academy Award and four British Academy Film Awards. Forbes ranked her as one of the highest-paid actresses in the world in 2020.

Blunt made her acting debut in a 2001 stage production of The Royal Family and portrayed Catherine Howard in the television miniseries Henry VIII (2003). She made her feature film debut in the drama My Summer of Love (2004). Blunt's breakthrough came in 2006 with her starring roles in the television film Gideon's Daughter and the comedy film The Devil Wears Prada. The former won her a Golden Globe Award for Best Supporting Actress.

Her profile continued to grow with leading roles in The Young Victoria (2009), Salmon Fishing in the Yemen (2011), The Adjustment Bureau (2011), Looper (2012), Edge of Tomorrow (2014), and Into the Woods (2014).

Blunt received critical acclaim for playing an idealistic FBI agent in the crime film Sicario (2015), an alcoholic in the thriller The Girl on the Train (2016), and a survivalist mother in her husband John Krasinski's horror film A Quiet Place (2018), for which she won the Actor Award for Best Supporting Actress. She has since starred in the sequels Mary Poppins Returns (2018), A Quiet Place Part II (2021) and The Devil Wears Prada 2 (2026), the science fiction film Disclosure Day (2026), and the miniseries The English (2022). Her portrayal of Katherine Oppenheimer in Christopher Nolan's film Oppenheimer (2023) earned her a nomination for the Academy Award for Best Supporting Actress.

Blunt has been working with the American Institute for Stuttering since 2006 to help children overcome stuttering through educational resources and raise awareness of the realities of the condition. She is on the board of directors of the institute, and hosts a gala for it to raise funds for speech therapy scholarships for children and adults.

== Early life ==
Blunt was born on 23 February 1983, in London. She is the second of four children of barrister Oliver Blunt KC and an English teacher and former actress, Joanna Mackie. Her mother gave up acting to parent full time before Blunt started school. Blunt described herself as a "shy and awkward" child, who began having difficulties with stuttering, a condition she described as debilitating and "like an imposter living in your body". She experienced it at its worst between the ages of seven and fourteen. Intimidated by speaking, she spent much time watching people, as well as creating elaborate games for herself, and playing the cello.

Blunt credits a school teacher with having encouraged her to perform in class plays, where using voices different to her own allowed her to disconnect from herself and speak fluently. This also gave her the confidence to continue on the stage and discover her love of acting. She said that her stutter largely receded in adulthood, but still occasionally emerges under stress. Blunt attended Ibstock Place School, a private school in the London suburb of Roehampton, followed by Hurtwood House, a private sixth-form boarding school in Surrey, known for its performing arts programme. After appearing in a school play at the Edinburgh Festival, Blunt was discovered and signed by an agent. Once she finished her school exams, she began auditioning.

== Career ==
=== 2001–2004: Career beginnings in British media ===
In November 2001, Blunt made her professional acting debut aged 18 in Peter Hall's West End production of the play The Royal Family, in which she played the granddaughter of Judi Dench's character. Critic Tom Keatinge hailed the production, writing that "Peter Hall's direction and Anthony Ward's tremendous set combine with all this to make The Royal Family a terrific night's entertainment", and that "it provides a vehicle for acting of the finest quality, with strong performances from the whole ensemble". For her performance, Blunt was named "Best Newcomer" by the Evening Standard. The following year, she portrayed Eugenie in Nicholas Wright's play Vincent in Brixton at the National Theatre, and Juliet in Indhu Rubasingham's production of Romeo and Juliet at Chichester Festival Theatre. In 2003, Blunt made her screen debut in the British television drama Boudica, about the life of the ancient Celtic warrior-queen who fought the Romans. That same year, she was praised for her performance as the 16th-century Queen Catherine Howard in the two-part British television drama Henry VIII.

In 2004, Blunt made her cinematic film debut in Paweł Pawlikowski's critically acclaimed independent British drama My Summer of Love, about an infatuation between two young women from different socioeconomic backgrounds set in the English countryside. The film involved much improvisation, which Blunt found an interesting challenge, later stating that Pawlikowski's approach was "free spirited, collaborative and alive". Co-starring as Tamsin, she received considerable praise and attention for her performance, with David Ansen of Newsweek writing: "Press and Blunt are major discoveries ... they conjure up the role-playing raptures of youth with perfect poetic pitch". Blunt won the Evening Standard British Film Award for Most Promising Newcomer and was nominated for the British Independent Film Award for Most Promising Newcomer. She credited her experience making the film as having an impact on her career choices, stating that it was "such a foray into the great unknown ....[like] putting your feet to the fire" and she "loved that feeling of terror and excitement" and "looked for it ever since".

=== 2005–2010: The Devil Wears Prada and breakthrough ===
Blunt's international breakthrough came in 2006. She co-starred as the troubled only child of a New Labour spin doctor in the British television drama film Gideon's Daughter, and played Emily Charlton, the senior assistant of fashion magazine editor Miranda Priestly (played by Meryl Streep), in the comedy-drama film The Devil Wears Prada. The Devil Wears Prada was a commercial success, grossing $326 million. Blunt's performance was deemed a standout, with Clifford Pugh of the Houston Chronicle asserting that "[Blunt] has many of the film's best lines and steals nearly every scene she's in." Blunt won the Golden Globe Award for Best Supporting Actress – Series, Miniseries or Television Film for her performance in Gideon's Daughter, and was nominated for the Golden Globe Award for Best Supporting Actress – Motion Picture for her performance in The Devil Wears Prada. She also received a BAFTA Award nomination for Best Actress in a Supporting Role for the latter. At the 79th Academy Awards, she and co-star Anne Hathaway co-presented the Academy Award for Best Costume Design, with both acting as their characters from the film. Blunt also appeared in the independent mystery drama Irresistible (2006). After The Devil Wears Prada, Streep described Blunt as "the best young actress I've worked with in some time, perhaps ever".

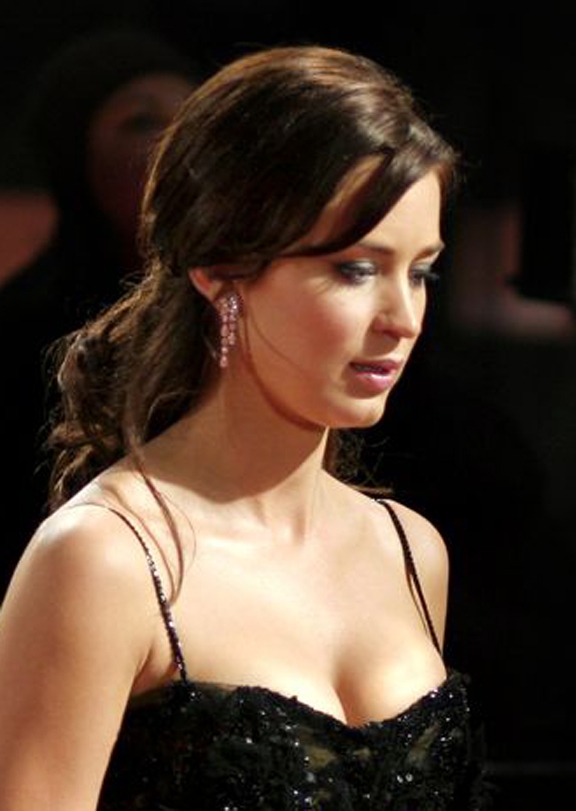
Blunt at the 60th British Academy Film Awards in 2007, where she received two BAFTA Award nominations

Blunt's profile continued to rise, and in 2007 she appeared in four films: the horror film Wind Chill, the romantic drama The Jane Austen Book Club, the comedy-drama Dan in Real Life, and the biographical comedy-drama Charlie Wilson's War. In 2008, Blunt appeared in Sunshine Cleaning in the role of Norah Lorkowski, an underachiever who starts a crime-scene clean-up business with her sister Rose (Amy Adams). The film premiered at the 2008 Sundance Film Festival, where it received positive reviews, particularly for Adams' and Blunt's performances. Peter Travers of Rolling Stone magazine commented "This funny and touching movie depends on two can-do actresses to scrub past the biohazard of noxious clichés that threaten to intrude. Adams and Blunt get the job done." A. O. Scott of The New York Times agreed, stating "Amy Adams and Emily Blunt [...] attack their roles with vivacity and dedication..." She then starred in The Great Buck Howard as Valerie Brennan, which premiered at the same festival.

In 2009, Blunt portrayed Queen Victoria in the independent period drama The Young Victoria, directed by Jean-Marc Vallée and written by Julian Fellowes, which focused primarily on her early life and reign, as well as her marriage to Prince Albert of Saxe-Coburg and Gotha. Blunt admitted to having little prior knowledge of the Queen, but after consulting her mother, had found her to be "remarkable" and "a very 21st century sort of woman". Blunt's performance earned critical accolades, and she was nominated for the Golden Globe Award for Best Actress in a Motion Picture – Drama and Critics' Choice Movie Award for Best Actress, among others. Owen Gleiberman of Entertainment Weekly concluded that "Director Jean-Marc Vallée's images have a creamy stateliness, but this is no gilded princess fantasy – it's the story of a budding ruler who learns to control her surroundings, and Blunt makes that journey at once authentic and relevant." That same year, Blunt received the BAFTA Britannia Award for British Artist of the Year.

She starred in the Toby Spanton–directed short film Curiosity. She also voiced Matilda Mouseling, the mother of the titular character, in the television series Angelina Ballerina: The Next Steps. In 2010, Blunt played a supporting role in the period horror film The Wolfman, starring Benicio del Toro and Anthony Hopkins. A re-adaptation of the 1941 film of the same name, it received mainly negative reviews, and according to the Los Angeles Times was one of the largest box-office failures of all time. Blunt was offered the role of Natasha Romanoff / Black Widow for Iron Man 2 (2010), but she was contractually obligated by 20th Century Fox to join the Jack Black-led comedy film Gulliver's Travels after the studio exercised an option it had for her when she signed on for The Devil Wears Prada.

=== 2011–2015: Rise to prominence and action-adventure roles ===
In 2011, Blunt co-starred with Matt Damon in the thriller The Adjustment Bureau, playing a dancer who is being "mysteriously kept apart" from a politician. The film earned generally positive reviews, with critics praising Blunt and Damon's chemistry. Blunt starred in the British romantic comedy-drama Salmon Fishing in the Yemen, directed by Lasse Hallström. She played a financial adviser who recruits a fisheries expert to help realise a sheikh's vision of bringing the sport of fly fishing to the Yemeni desert, resulting in a spiritual journey for both. The film premiered at the 2011 Toronto International Film Festival, receiving positive reviews, as did Blunt's performance. Kenneth Turan of the Los Angeles Times noted that "Blunt and [co-star Ewan McGregor] are two of the most gifted and attractive actors working today, able to play off each other with great style...". Blunt was nominated for the Golden Globe Award for Best Actress – Motion Picture Comedy or Musical for her performance. Also that year, she made a cameo appearance in Disney's The Muppets as Miss Piggy's receptionist, and starred in the independent comedy-drama Your Sister's Sister. In November 2011, Blunt was named the ambassador for the new Yves Saint Laurent fragrance Opium.

In 2012, Blunt starred in the romantic comedy The Five-Year Engagement, directed by Nicholas Stoller and co-starring Jason Segel, in which she and Segel played a couple whose relationship becomes strained when their engagement is continually extended. The film earned positive reviews, with Elizabeth Weitzman of the New York Daily News remarking that "Blunt has never been more relaxed, and she and Segel have a believably warm chemistry." She then starred in Looper, a science fiction action film directed by Rian Johnson. Blunt played Sara, a tough farm woman and single mother, who falls in love with a time-traveller. The film premiered and was the opening film at the 2012 Toronto International Film Festival, and earned highly positive feedback. Todd McCarthy of The Hollywood Reporter credited Blunt for "effectively [revealing] Sara's tough and vulnerable sides". Also that year, she starred in the comedy-drama Arthur Newman as the troubled Charlotte, who is trying to run away from her past. The film received mixed-to-negative reviews.

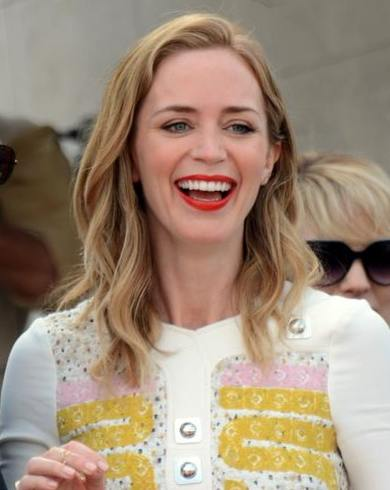
Blunt attending the premiere of Sicario at the 2015 Cannes Film Festival

In 2014, Blunt starred in Edge of Tomorrow, a film adaptation of the Japanese novel All You Need Is Kill written by Hiroshi Sakurazaka. Blunt played Sergeant Rita Vrataski, a Special Forces warrior tasked with training a public relations officer to defeat invading extraterrestrials. Blunt trained three months for her role, "focusing on everything from weights to sprints to yoga, aerial wire work and gymnastics", and studying Krav Maga. The film was commercially successful, grossing $370,541,256 and earned positive reviews. Many critics took note of the atypically dominant role portrayed by Blunt, and Justin Chang of Variety noted that "Blunt is alert, energized and emotionally present in a none-too-taxing role." For her performance, Blunt won the Critics' Choice Movie Award for Best Actress in an Action Movie.

Blunt played the role of the Baker's Wife in The Walt Disney Company's film adaptation of Stephen Sondheim's musical Into the Woods, directed by Rob Marshall and featuring an ensemble cast. Marshall shared that he cast Blunt due to her "warmth", and believed she could ensure the emotional impact of her character's sudden demise. Ironically, Blunt was pregnant throughout filming, while playing a character who is barren throughout the film's first act. Consequently, her costuming and choreography had to be adjusted to accommodate her pregnancy. The film was a commercial success and earned generally positive reviews, with Blunt earning praise for her acting and singing. Richard Corliss of Time remarked that "When Blunt is onscreen, these woods are alive with the magic of a fractured fairy tale...". She was nominated for her second Golden Globe Award for Best Actress – Motion Picture Comedy or Musical for her performance.

In 2015, Blunt starred in the crime thriller Sicario, directed by Denis Villeneuve. Blunt played Kate Macer, a principled FBI agent assigned to take down the leader of a powerful Mexican drug cartel. The film was selected to compete for the Palme d'Or at the 2015 Cannes Film Festival, where it received critical acclaim. Blunt received considerable praise for her performance, with Dan Jolin of Empire magazine calling it "nuanced", and stating that "her straight-arrow-sharp determination becomes painfully dulled", and while Peter Bradshaw of The Guardian found her character implausible, he praised Blunt for "[brazening] out any possible absurdity with great acting focus and front". Blunt was nominated for her second consecutive Critics' Choice Movie Award for Best Actress in an Action Movie.

=== 2016–2022: Established actress and A Quiet Place films ===
In 2016, Blunt co-starred in The Huntsman: Winter's War, which serves as both a prequel and sequel to Snow White and the Huntsman (2012). The film, directed by Cedric Nicolas-Troyan, was mostly dismissed by critics. Blunt then headlined the mystery thriller The Girl on the Train, directed by Tate Taylor. Based on Paula Hawkins's best-selling novel of the same name, Blunt played Rachel Watson, an alcoholic who becomes involved in a missing person investigation. While the film received mixed reviews from critics, who felt it failed to live up to the novel, Blunt's performance earned considerable praise. Writing for Rolling Stone, Peter Travers remarked that "the movie gives away the game faster than the novel", but credited Blunt for "playing the hell out of [her character] and adding a touch of welcome empathy. [She] digs into the role like an actress possessed – there's not an ounce of vanity here, [and she] raise[s] Girl to the level of spellbinder." She was nominated for the BAFTA Award for Best Actress in a Leading Role and the Actor Award for Outstanding Performance by a Female Actor in a Leading Role.

After providing her voice for the 2017 animated films My Little Pony: The Movie and Animal Crackers, Blunt made her return to live action in her husband John Krasinski's horror film A Quiet Place, which follows a family being tormented by monstrous creatures that hunt by sound. Scott Beck and Bryan Woods had begun writing the script in January 2016 based on a concept they conceived in college, and they wanted Blunt for the role of the mother. When Krasinski re-wrote the script, he did so with Blunt in mind for the role, but did not ask her as she had just had a child and was working on another film; he was concerned that if asked she would either decline, or accept it simply to support him: "I just thought if she does this, she has to come to it on her own." Blunt initially did not want to be cast, but after reading Krasinski's draft on an aeroplane flight she felt she needed to do it as the story "represented some of my deepest fears – of not being able to protect my children". Blunt contributed to the pre-production stage of the film.

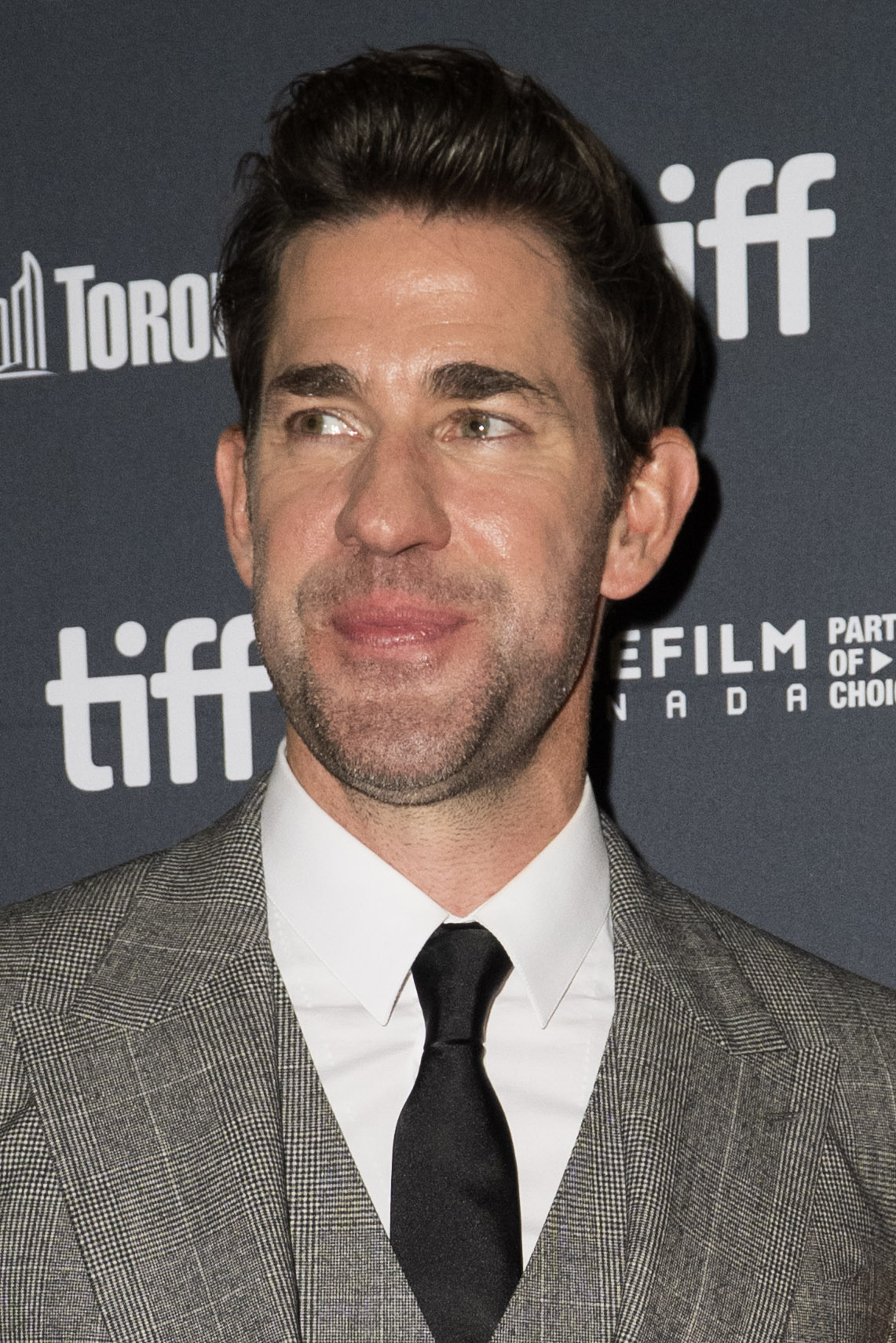
Blunt starred in her husband John Krasinski's horror film A Quiet Place (2018) and its sequel A Quiet Place Part II (2021).

A Quiet Place was the opening night film at the 2018 South by Southwest film festival, where it received critical acclaim; Eric Kohn of IndieWire lauded the cast for "contribut[ing] credible intensity to their scenes with a degree of sophistication rare for this type of material", while Laura Prudom of IGN remarked that "Blunt, in particular, is put through the wringer in ways that would seem almost farcical, if she didn't play them with such compelling conviction." Blunt played the title character in Rob Marshall's 2018 musical fantasy film Mary Poppins Returns. It served as a sequel to the 1964 film, with Blunt taking over the role from Julie Andrews. Owen Gleiberman of Variety found Blunt to be "practically perfect in every way" and added that she "inhabits Mary Poppins' snappishly entrancing spirit, and in the musical numbers she generates her own spit-spot radiance". She received two Actor Award nominations for her performances in A Quiet Place and Mary Poppins Returns, winning Best Supporting Actress for the former and her sixth Golden Globe nomination for the latter.

In 2020, Blunt guest-starred in her husband's internet series Some Good News, which began streaming on YouTube during the COVID-19 pandemic. She starred in the romantic drama Wild Mountain Thyme – based on John Patrick Shanley's play Outside Mullingar. The part required her to speak with an Irish accent; neither the film nor her accent were well received. In the same year, Forbes ranked her as the sixth highest-paid actress in the world, with annual earnings of $22.5 million.

Blunt reprised her role in the horror sequel A Quiet Place Part II (2021), which was released after a year-long delay due to the pandemic. It became one of the first major Hollywood films to be released theatrically since the beginning of the pandemic. Peter Bradshaw bemoaned that the "excellent" Blunt did not have more screen time. As with the first film, it also emerged as a commercial success. Later that year, Blunt starred alongside Dwayne Johnson in the adventure film Jungle Cruise, based on the eponymous amusement ride. It was released simultaneously in cinemas and digitally on Disney+ Premier Access. Jeannette Catsoulis of The New York Times disliked the picture saying "not even Emily Blunt, doing her best Katharine Hepburn impression, can keep this leaky boat ride afloat". The following year, Blunt played an avenging mother in the television miniseries The English, a western by Hugo Blick. Critics were impressed with her performance. Lucy Mangan of The Guardian said, "Blunt is at her best yet, giving us a woman made brave and undauntable by resolve". She received another Actor Award nomination for it.

=== 2023–present: Oppenheimer and critical achievements ===
In Christopher Nolan's biographical film Oppenheimer (2023), starring Cillian Murphy as J. Robert Oppenheimer, Blunt portrayed the eponymous scientist's wife Katherine, who was a member of the Communist Party USA. She took a pay cut to work on the film, earning $4 million in lieu of her usual $10- to $20-million salary. Nolan said that he thought about "running away" from the character while writing the script as she was "terrifying", but Blunt humanised her and surprised him in how she embraced her negative qualities: "No vanity, no fear of humiliation, no wanting to control the way she would appear". The film was praised, although some criticism was made of the writing for the female characters. Blunt's performance received praise, and was singled out for elevating the limited material she had. Writing for Empire, Dan Jolin said that Blunt "busts out of the supportive/suffering wife archetype as the alcoholic but sharp-witted Kitty Oppenheimer" and delivers "one of the film's most rousing scenes in an intense verbal duel with bullish lawyer Roger Robb", and Tomris Laffly of The Wrap called her performance "subtly scene-stealing". Blunt once again received nominations for the Golden Globe, Actor, and BAFTA Award, in addition to her first Academy Award nomination for Best Supporting Actress. With a worldwide gross of over $950 million, Oppenheimer emerged as Blunt's highest-grossing film.

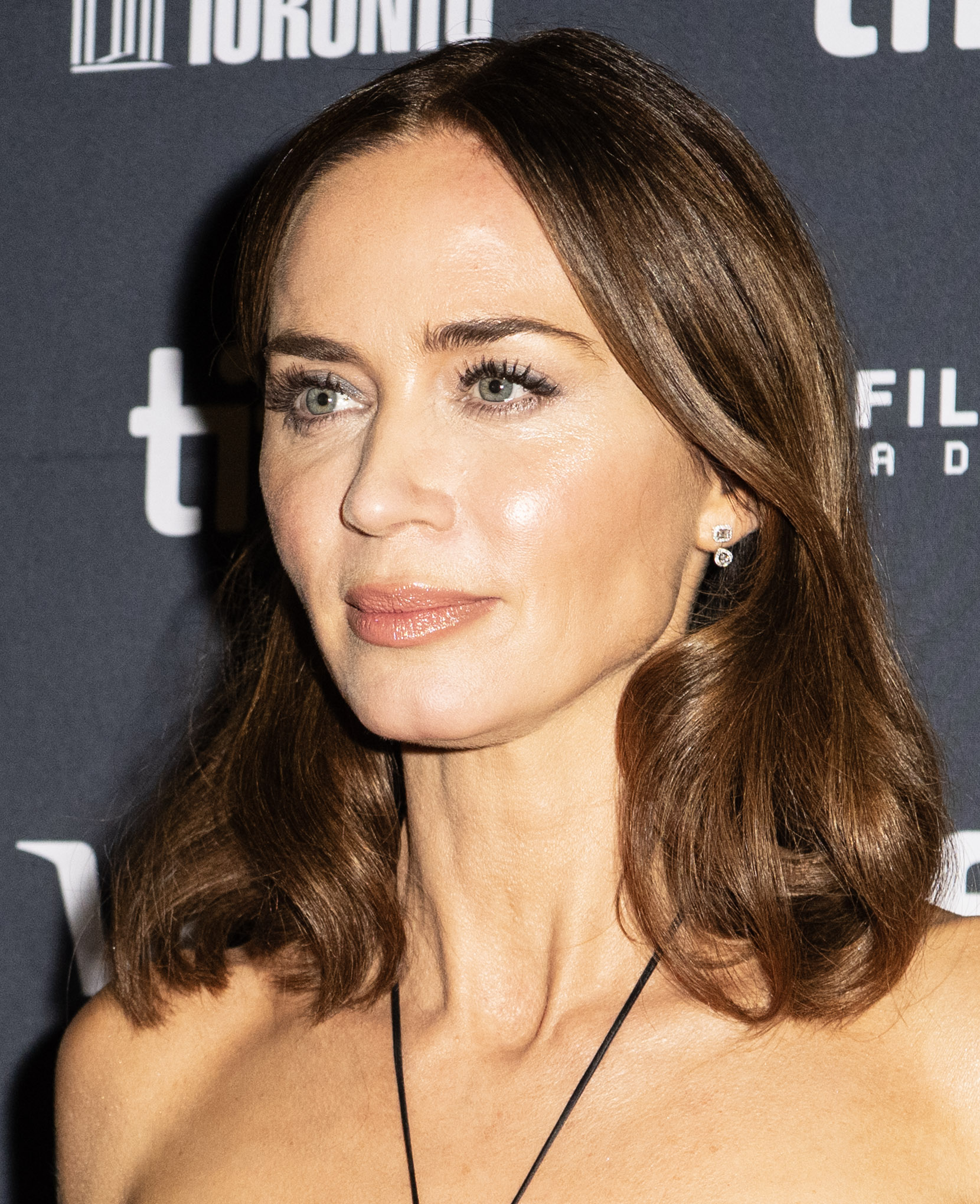
Blunt in 2025

Her later release that year, the Netflix crime drama Pain Hustlers opposite Chris Evans, received poor reviews from critics. Blunt next starred with Ryan Gosling in David Leitch's action comedy film The Fall Guy (2024). For her role as a filmmaker, she drew inspiration from Greta Gerwig. IGN's Siddhant Adlakha was appreciate of the romantic chemistry between Blunt and Gosling. It did not perform well commercially. She then had a voice role as Unicorn in Krasinski's live-action animated fantasy film IF. Blunt next starred in the Benny Safdie biographical sports drama The Smashing Machine, starring Dwayne Johnson as MMA wrestler Mark Kerr. She played Kerr's girlfriend Dawn Staples. The film received positive reviews, and Blunt received a Golden Globe nomination.

Blunt was awarded a star on the Hollywood Walk of Fame on 30 April 2026, as part of a joint ceremony with Stanley Tucci, in recognition of her contributions to motion pictures. Blunt reprised the role of Emily Charlton in The Devil Wears Prada 2, which was released on 1 May 2026. Due to $233.6 million earned globally during the opening weekend, it was the highest-grossing box office debut in her career. She is also starring in Steven Spielberg's science fiction film Disclosure Day, co-starring Josh O'Connor, released on 12 June 2026.

== Reception ==
Journalists have noted Blunt's versatility as an actor and her roles in various genres, including drama, comedy, musicals, and action. (Note: Reception:) The Guardian observed her ability to not be pigeonholed into a type of role, and wrote that she "specialises in a sort of calculated understatement", praising her "insight into what makes characters tick and her facility for accents". Commenting on her engaging screen presence, Rachel Rosenblint of Elle stated that "she has a knack for playing subtle, unspoken notes like a virtuoso". The New York Times regarded Blunt as having a "taste for the offbeat and a fetching lack of vanity when it comes to playing disagreeable women" and noted her "adventurous spirit" as a performer. Describing the nuances of a performance, The Age wrote, "It's no wonder that Meryl Streep has already pronounced Blunt "the best young actress I've worked with in some time, perhaps ever"." Aaron Hicklin said in The Guardian that Blunt's career "has been marked by a succession of stretching new roles". The Los Angeles Times assessed that from the start of her career, Blunt "has always proved up for whatever the challenge may be", and noted her "fluidity" in working between drama and comedy. Screen Rant stated that Blunt has "a number of iconic roles under her belt". Her work in action roles has also been singled out, with Collider writing that it is "proof that action cinema has the potential to be morally, ethically, and emotionally nuanced", and deeming Blunt one of the "rare performers" that exceed as both an actor and movie star. Catherine Shoard of The Guardian named her "the biggest British female movie star of her generation", comparing her to Keira Knightley, Carey Mulligan, Rachel Weisz, and Kate Winslet. Vanity Fair commented that she has portrayed "a kaleidoscope of mesmerizing characters" and found a "delicate balance" as "a movie star with character-actor range".

== Advocacy ==
Blunt helps to promote and raise funds for the Malala Fund, a non-profit organisation that advocates for girls' education, co-founded by Malala Yousafzai. She also works with Family Reach, an organisation that helps financially support families affected by cancer. Blunt has also been working with the American Institute for Stuttering since 2006 to help children overcome stuttering through educational resources and raise awareness of the realities of the condition. She is on the board of directors of the institute, and hosts a gala for it each year to raise funds for speech therapy scholarships for children and adults.

== Personal life ==
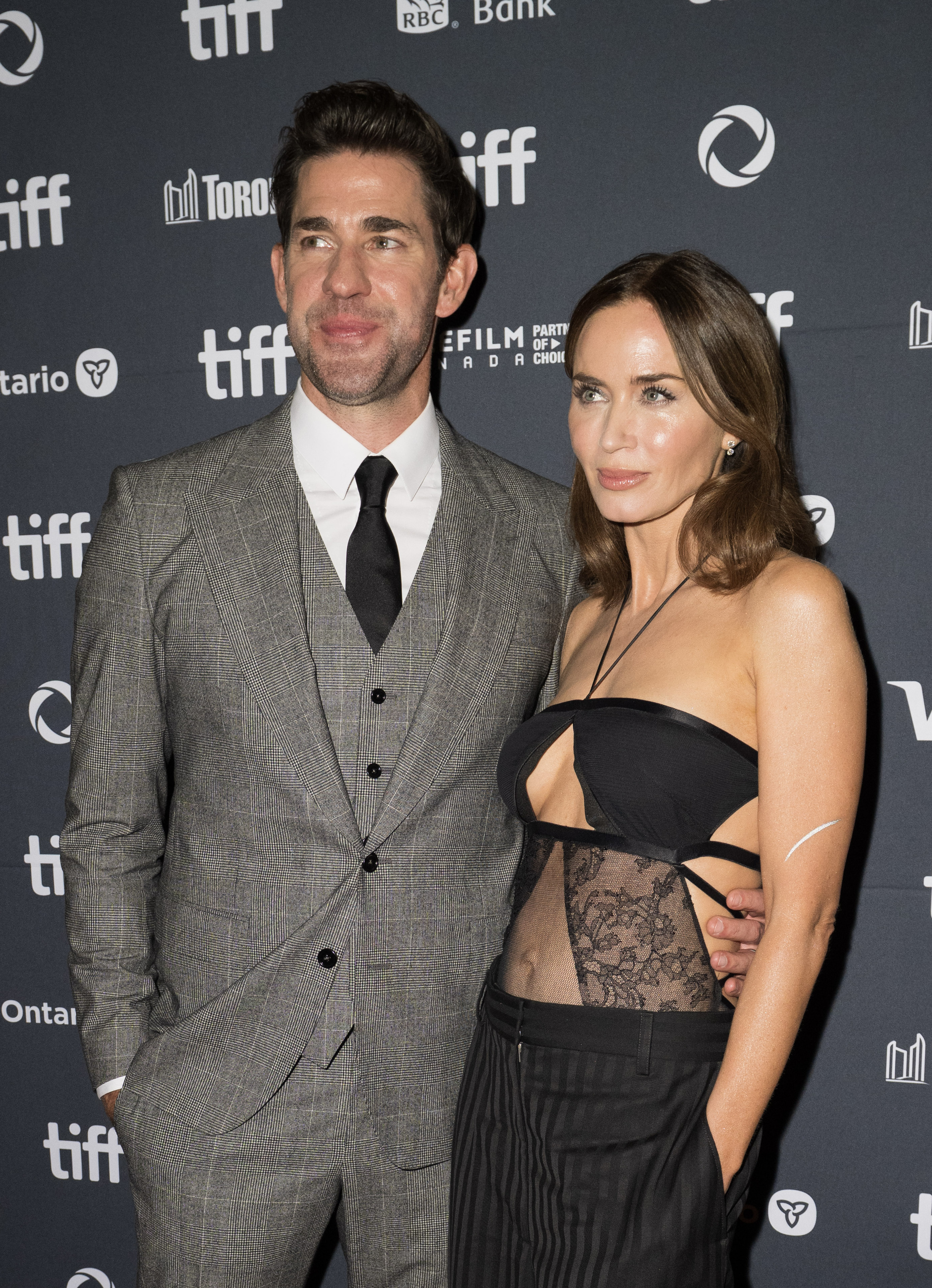
Blunt with her husband John Krasinski in 2025

Blunt was in a relationship with Canadian singer Michael Bublé from 2005 to 2008. She and American actor John Krasinski were introduced to each other by a mutual friend and began dating in November 2008. They became engaged in August 2009 and married in Como, Italy, in July 2010. They have two daughters, one born in 2014 and the other in 2016.

In 2012, Blunt became the sister-in-law of actor Stanley Tucci when he married her sister Felicity. In 2015, Blunt became an American citizen through naturalisation, making her a dual citizen of the UK and US.

== Acting credits and awards ==
According to the review aggregator site Rotten Tomatoes and the box office site Box Office Mojo, Blunt's most critically acclaimed and commercially successful films include My Summer of Love (2004), The Devil Wears Prada (2006), Sunshine Cleaning (2008), Your Sister's Sister (2011), Looper (2012), Edge of Tomorrow (2014), Into the Woods (2014), Sicario (2015), The Girl on the Train (2016), A Quiet Place (2018), Mary Poppins Returns (2018), A Quiet Place Part II (2021), and Oppenheimer (2023).

Blunt has received multiple accolades for her work across film, television and stage, including a Golden Globe Award, two Actor Awards, and nominations for an Academy Award and four British Academy Film Awards.

== See also ==
- List of actors with Academy Award nominations
- List of British Academy Award nominees and winners
