= The Adjustment Bureau =

2011 film by George Nolfi

- Theatrical release poster
- Directed by: George Nolfi
- Screenplay by: George Nolfi
- Based on: "Adjustment Team" by Philip K. Dick
- Produced by: Michael Hackett; George Nolfi; Bill Carraro; Chris Moore
- Starring: Matt Damon; Emily Blunt; Anthony Mackie; John Slattery; Michael Kelly; Terence Stamp
- Cinematography: John Toll
- Edited by: Jay Rabinowitz
- Music by: Thomas Newman
- Production companies: Media Rights Capital; Gambit Pictures; Electric Shepherd Productions
- Distributed by: Universal Pictures
- Release dates: February 14, 2011 (Ziegfeld Theatre); March 4, 2011 (United States)
- Running time: 106 minutes
- Country: United States
- Language: English
- Budget: $62 million
- Box office: $127.8 million

The Adjustment Bureau is a 2011 American science fiction romantic thriller film written, directed and co-produced by George Nolfi in his directorial debut, loosely based on Philip K. Dick's 1954 short story "Adjustment Team". The film stars Matt Damon, Emily Blunt, Anthony Mackie, John Slattery, Michael Kelly, and Terence Stamp. Its plot follows an ambitious young congressman who finds himself entranced by a beautiful dancer, but mysterious forces are conspiring to prevent their love affair.

The Adjustment Bureau premiered at the Ziegfeld Theatre in New York City on February 14, 2011, and was theatrically released in the United States by Universal Pictures on March 4, 2011. The film received positive reviews from critics and grossed over $127.8 million worldwide against a $62 million budget. It was nominated for Best Science Fiction Film and Blunt won Best Supporting Actress at the 38th Saturn Awards.

== Plot ==
In 2006, Brooklyn Democratic congressman David Norris unsuccessfully runs for the United States Senate. While rehearsing his concession speech in a men's bathroom, David meets Elise Sellas, who has been hiding after crashing a wedding and had overheard him, and they kiss. David does not get Elise's name before they are separated, but, inspired by her, he delivers an unusually candid speech that is well-received and makes him a favorite for the next Senate election.

One month later, a man named Harry Mitchell receives an assignment from a man named Richardson at Madison Square Park, which is near David's home. He is supposed to spill coffee on David's shirt by 7:05 a.m., forcing David to go home to change. However, Mitchell falls asleep, so David catches his intended bus and meets Elise again. Before she gets off the bus, David gets her name and phone number.

David arrives at work before he is supposed to and finds his coworkers frozen and being examined by unfamiliar men, including Richardson. He attempts to escape, but is incapacitated and taken to a warehouse. After some debate about what to do, Richardson reveals to David the existence of the "Adjustment Bureau", an organization that ensures people's lives proceed according to "the Plan" created by "the Chairman". Humans only have the appearance of free will, as the Bureau's experiments with withdrawing their influence resulted in the Dark Ages and the horrors of the first half of the 20th century. Richardson says that David was not supposed to see Elise a second time, destroys the card with her phone number on it, and releases David, warning him that his memory and personality will be erased if he tells anyone about what he has learned.

Three years later, David spots Elise on the street. He invites her to lunch, but Charlie (David's campaign manager), after an adjustment initiated by Richardson, interrupts them with reminders that David is scheduled to announce that he is running for another Senate seat. Richardson tries to prevent David and Elise from reuniting after the announcement. Still, David persists and outruns Richardson to Elise's rehearsal with Cedar Lake Contemporary Ballet, even though members of the Bureau have a way to teleport using ordinary doorways.

Richardson learns that David and Elise keep crossing paths because of remnants from earlier versions of the Plan in which they were meant to be together, and Thompson, a senior official in the Bureau, takes over David's case. He talks to David, who claims to have the right to choose his path through life. Thompson says that being with Elise will keep David from his fate of becoming president of the United States, and being with David will keep Elise from becoming a world-famous dancer and choreographer. To prove that he is serious, Thompson causes Elise to sprain her ankle. David later abandons her at the hospital to avoid ruining their futures.

Eleven months later, Charlie alerts David to Elise's imminent wedding. Harry surreptitiously arranges to meet with David when it is raining, since water prevents the Bureau from tracking people. As David's "caseworker", Harry feels guilty about all of the negative things he has helped to make happen to David in support of the Plan, so he teaches David how to use doors to teleport and, hopefully, reach Elise before the Bureau can stop him.

David finds Elise before the wedding and tells her about the Bureau, proving his claims by teleporting with her. Agents of the Bureau pursue them all over New York City, and, eventually, David decides to try to plead his case directly to the chairman. Elise chooses to accompany him, and they enter the Bureau's headquarters. Chased to the roof and surrounded, David and Elise declare their love and kiss. When they let go of each other, they are alone. Thompson appears, but is interrupted by Harry, who presents the chairman's newly revised Plan for David and Elise, which is blank going forward. Harry commends David and Elise for their devotion and sends them away, speculating that the chairman's actual "plan" may be for people to fight for their free will and write their destinies, as David and Elise have done.

== Cast ==
- Matt Damon as David Norris
- Emily Blunt as Elise Sellas
- Anthony Mackie as Harry Mitchell
- John Slattery as Richardson
- Michael Kelly as Charlie Traynor
- Terence Stamp as Thompson
- Donnie Keshawarz as Donaldson
- Anthony Ruivivar as McCrady
- David Bishins as Burdensky
- Amanda Warren as Senior Campaign Aide
- Jennifer Ehle as Brooklyn Ice House Bartender
- Pedro Pascal as Maitre D' Paul De Santo
- Brian Haley as Police Officer Maes
- Jessica Lee Keller as Lauren, Elise's Best Friend
- Shane McRae as Adrian Troussant, Elise's Fiancé
- David Alan Basche as Thompson's Aide

Chuck Scarborough, Jon Stewart, Michael Bloomberg, James Carville, Mary Matalin, and Betty Liu appear as themselves.

== Production ==
=== Writing ===
In early drafts of the script, the character of Norris was changed from a real-estate salesman, as in Philip K. Dick's short story, to an up-and-coming U.S. Congressman.

=== Financing ===
Media Rights Capital funded the film and then auctioned it to distributors, with Universal Studios putting in the winning bid of $62 million. Variety reported Damon's involvement on February 24, 2009, and Blunt's on July 14.

=== Filming ===
Writer/director George Nolfi worked with John Toll as his cinematographer. Shots were planned with storyboards, but changed often during shooting to fit the conditions of the day. The visual plan for the film was to use a dolly or crane to keep camera movements smooth and employ a more formal style when the Adjustment Bureau is in full control, and to use hand-held cameras and allow things to become looser when the Bureau is losing control.

=== Original ending ===
The climactic scene on the "Top of the Rock" rooftop observation deck of 30 Rockefeller Plaza was filmed four months after the completion of principal photography. According to Nolfi, the ending that had originally been shot featured "the Chairman":

[I]nitially I was going to show the Chairman. The Chairman was going to be in female form, too. Ultimately, while making the movie, I realized how important it was going to be for people to put their own beliefs in the end and not foreclose that. I don't think the scene would have foreclosed [people's] beliefs, but the more I could hint at it and the less explicit I could be about it, it wasn't enough to hint about it in the dialog and have an actual person there acting it. I just had to not show the Chairman, so I ended up not going that way.

The chairman was later revealed to have been portrayed by actress Shohreh Aghdashloo, who, in her 2013 memoir The Alley of Love and Yellow Jasmines, said Nolfi told her that Universal Pictures was to blame for the change to the ending. She said in an interview with the Los Angeles Times:

I loved that role. As actors, we all know we're at the mercy of the editing table, but not to this extent, never had I experienced it. The director, George Nolfi, decided I should play God. Everything went great until I got a call from the director who was asking to have lunch with me. He was on the verge of crying. He said, the distribution company believes that you cannot play this role.

=== Music ===
The score for the film was composed and conducted by Thomas Newman, and two songs by Richard Ashcroft appear on the soundtrack: "Future's Bright" (which was co-written by Newman) during the opening sequence and "Are You Ready?" during the end credits.

== Religious themes ==
Some reviewers identified Abrahamic theological implications in the film, such as an omnipotent and omniscient God, the concepts of free will and predestination, and elements from the descent to the underworld (a mytheme dating back at least to the story of Eurydice and Orpheus). Cathleen Falsani said that the Chairman represents God, while his caseworkers are angels. The director of the film, George Nolfi, stated that the "intention of this film is to raise questions".

== Release ==
=== Theatrical ===
The Adjustment Bureau had its world premiere at the Ziegfeld Theatre in New York City on February 14, 2011. The film was originally scheduled to be released on July 30, 2010, but was pushed back to September 17. In July 2010, Universal Pictures announced that the release date was pushed back again to March 4, 2011, because Damon had to promote his two other films, True Grit and Hereafter.

=== Home media ===
The film was released on DVD and Blu-ray Disc on June 21, 2011. It was the top selling release the first week it was for sale.

== Reception ==
=== Box office ===
The Adjustment Bureau made $20.9 million from 2,840 theaters in its opening weekend, finishing second at the box office behind Rango ($38 million). The film ultimately grossed $62.5 million in the United States and Canada, and $65.3 million in other territories, for a worldwide total of $127.8 million.

=== Critical response ===
On the review aggregator website Rotten Tomatoes, 71% of 258 critics' reviews are positive, with an average rating of 6.6/10. The website's consensus reads: "First-time writer/director George Nolfi struggles to maintain a consistent tone, but The Adjustment Bureau rises on the strong, believable chemistry of its stars." Metacritic, which uses a weighted average, assigned the film a score of 60 out of 100, based on 41 critics, indicating "mixed or average" reviews. Audiences polled by CinemaScore gave the film an average grade of "B" on an A+ to F scale.

Roger Ebert of the Chicago Sun-Times gave the film three out of four stars, describing it as "a smart and good movie that could have been a great one, if it had been a little more daring. I suspect the filmmakers were reluctant to follow its implications too far." The New York Times called the film "a fast, sure film about finding and keeping love across time and space ... [that] has brightened the season with a witty mix of science-fiction metaphysics and old-fashioned romance."

== See also ==
- List of films about angels
- List of adaptations of works by Philip K. Dick
- Matt Damon filmography
- List of Emily Blunt performances
- List of directorial debuts
- List of short fiction made into feature films
