= Your Sister's Sister =

2011 film by Lynn Shelton

- Theatrical release poster
- Directed by: Lynn Shelton
- Written by: Lynn Shelton
- Produced by: Steven Schardt
- Starring: Emily Blunt; Rosemarie DeWitt; Mark Duplass
- Cinematography: Benjamin Kasulke
- Edited by: Nat Sanders
- Music by: Vinny Smith
- Production company: ADA Films
- Distributed by: IFC Films
- Release dates: September 11, 2011 (TIFF); June 15, 2012 (United States)
- Running time: 90 minutes
- Country: United States
- Language: English
- Budget: $120,000
- Box office: $3.2 million

Your Sister's Sister is a 2011 American romantic comedy-drama film written and directed by Lynn Shelton. It stars Emily Blunt, Rosemarie DeWitt, and Mark Duplass. It follows a grieving man who, after his brother's death, accepts his best friend's offer to spend a weekend at her family's isolated cabin, where he runs into her half-sister.

The film had its world premiere at the 36th Toronto International Film Festival on September 11, 2011, and was theatrically released in the United States on June 15, 2012, by IFC Films. It received positive reviews from critics, who particularly praised the performances of the cast. It won Best Ensemble Performance at the 22nd Gotham Independent Film Awards and DeWitt was nominated for Best Supporting Female at the 28th Independent Spirit Awards.

== Plot ==
Jack is struggling emotionally a year after the death of his brother. His friend, Iris, who is also his brother's ex-girlfriend, offers to let him stay at her family's remote island retreat in the Pacific Northwest to restore his spirits. Upon arrival, he finds Iris's lesbian sister, Hannah, who has recently broken up with her partner and is staying there without Iris's knowledge.

They talk and drink together, and end up sleeping together, using Hannah's condom. Iris arrives at the cabin unexpectedly the next morning, and Jack suggests that he and Hannah shouldn't tell her they slept together. Iris later tells her sister that she's fallen in love with Jack.

The next day, Iris mentions that Hannah wants to have a baby. Jack examines the used condom, and finds Hannah had poked holes in it. Hannah confesses to Iris she slept with Jack. Iris confronts Jack about it, and Jack accuses Hannah of stealing his sperm. Hannah admits it, but says she would never have slept with Jack if she had known Iris was in love with him. Jack is stunned to hear Iris loves him, and Iris is stunned that Hannah told him.

Later that night, Jack talks to Iris and apologizes. He reveals to Iris that he was only with Hannah because he can't be with her, which breaks Iris's heart because they could have avoided it all if only they had confessed their feelings towards each other sooner. Both Jack and Iris break down crying, and Jack leaves. Over the next day or so, the sisters gradually reconcile, with Iris offering to help Hannah to raise the child should she give birth.

Eventually, Jack returns to the cabin and requites Iris's love, also offering to help Hannah to take care of her possible baby. The trio return to the city, and the final scene has Hannah taking a home pregnancy test with Iris and Jack joining her to see the result, which is not revealed.

== Cast ==
- Emily Blunt as Iris
- Rosemarie DeWitt as Hannah
- Mark Duplass as Jack
- Mike Birbiglia as Al
- Jeanette Maus as Tom's friend

== Production ==
The film was shot in 12 days on Fidalgo Island and in the San Juan Islands of Washington state. Rachel Weisz was originally cast to play the character of Hannah, but had to drop out three days before the shoot. Rosemarie DeWitt was cast the day before the shoot began. The actors partly improvised their dialogue.

== Reception ==
=== Critical response ===
On the review aggregator website Rotten Tomatoes, 85% of 143 critics' reviews are positive. The website's consensus reads: "Superbly acted and satisfyingly engaging, Your Sister's Sister subverts rom-com conventions with sensitive direction, an unconventional screenplay, and a big heart." Metacritic, which uses a weighted average, assigned the film a score of 72 out of 100, based on 29 critics, indicating "generally favorable" reviews.

Justin Chang of Variety described the film as a "deftly performed, semi-improvised three-hander [which] reps a step up in polish and ambition from its predecessor — arguably too much ambition in an excess of late-breaking narrative complication." A. O. Scott of The New York Times stated, "The picture is, intermittently, delightful to contemplate. […] The loose, vagabond rhythm makes Your Sister's Sister feel a bit like a French movie, immersed in personalities rather than driven by the machinery of plot." Ann Hornaday of The Washington Post gave the film 3 out of 4 stars and wrote, "Very little is simple in Your Sister's Sister — not the emotions, the naturalistic tone or the unstudied, easygoing performances. But the film's pleasures are." Peter Travers of Rolling Stone rated it 3 out of 5 stars and highlighted, "A trio of superb performances guide a plot that pivots on secrets and lies before they fester. Your Sister's Sister works its way into your head until you can't stop thinking about it." Eric Kohn of IndieWire gave the film an "A−" and opined, "While not an unbridled crowdpleaser on par with Humpday, this smaller achievement is endearing for other reasons. The excessive chatter flows nicely thanks to fine-tuned performances and the chemistry to sustain them." Lisa Schwarzbaum of Entertainment Weekly also gave it an "A−" and commented, "Your Sister's Sister moves far beyond easy conventions, and the rewards are all the richer. […] Each an actor of distinctive delicacy, Duplass, DeWitt, and Blunt do some of their subtlest, most sweetly calibrated work ever."

== Remake ==
A French remake entitled Half Sister, Full Love (Et Ta Sœur in French speaking markets) premiered in 2014. The film was written and directed by Marion Vernoux and stars Virginie Efira, Grégoire Ludig and Géraldine Nakache as Marie, Pierrick and Tessa, the respective analogues of Iris, Jack and Hannah. It is the second Lynn Shelton film to be remade in France after Humpday three years earlier.
