= The Smashing Machine (2025 film) =

2025 film by Benny Safdie

- Theatrical release poster
- Directed by: Benny Safdie
- Written by: Benny Safdie
- Produced by: Benny Safdie; Dwayne Johnson; Eli Bush; Hiram Garcia; Dany Garcia; David Koplan
- Starring: Dwayne Johnson; Emily Blunt; Ryan Bader; Bas Rutten; Oleksandr Usyk
- Cinematography: Maceo Bishop
- Edited by: Benny Safdie
- Music by: Nala Sinephro
- Production companies: A24; Out for the Count; Seven Bucks Productions; Magnetic Fields Entertainment
- Distributed by: A24
- Release dates: September 1, 2025 (Venice); October 3, 2025 (United States)
- Running time: 123 minutes
- Country: United States
- Language: English
- Budget: $50 million
- Box office: $21.1 million

The Smashing Machine is a 2025 American biographical sports drama film, written and directed by Benny Safdie. It stars Dwayne Johnson as American combat sportsman Mark Kerr, alongside Emily Blunt as Kerr's girlfriend, with supporting roles from Ryan Bader, Bas Rutten and Oleksandr Usyk.

The Smashing Machine premiered at the 82nd Venice International Film Festival on September 1, 2025, where it won the Silver Lion. It was released in the United States on October 3 by A24, and received generally positive reviews from critics, with particular praise towards Johnson's performance. The film was a box office bomb, grossing $21 million against a $50 million budget. It was nominated for Best Makeup and Hairstyling at the 98th Academy Awards. At the 83rd Golden Globe Awards, Johnson was nominated for Best Actor and Blunt was nominated for Best Supporting Actress.

== Plot ==
The film begins in 1997 with an interview of Mark Kerr, who explains to the interviewer his success in the Ultimate Fighting Championship, before he leaves for his next bout.

In 1999, Mark is at home with his girlfriend, Dawn, with whom he shares a complicated relationship. Later, he prepares for a fight while being coached by Mark Coleman, and stumbles in and out of narcotic painkiller use while meeting Japanese officials regarding his pay.

Mark sits in his locker room in a vaguely altered state due to the painkillers, when he and Dawn begin to argue. After a devastating loss in the ring, he quietly leaves to his locker room and begins sobbing. Back home, his relationship with Dawn further deteriorates and he overdoses the next morning. Coleman visits him and tells him that he needs to change, which Mark agrees with. He begins rehab, which strains his relationship with Dawn, eventually resulting in her leaving and Mark leaving to camp with Bas Rutten.

Mark does extremely well under the coaching of Bas, getting into peak shape, and winning his first fight since the overdose. He eventually reconciles with Dawn, which, to the dismay of Bas, results in Mark leaving camp. Mark and Dawn later have a falling out over her hedonistic habits, resulting in Mark breaking up with Dawn and asking her to leave. A distraught Dawn attempts suicide, resulting in her going into care. In Japan, a distracted Mark loses his next fight brutally, as he has flashbacks of Dawn and other moments of his life and career. Later, with Mark's encouragement, Coleman wins the 2000 Pride Grand Prix, while Mark receives stitches. He sits in the shower, smiling and laughing, content at his loss.

In a flash forward to 2025, the real Mark Kerr is shown shopping at a grocery store in Scottsdale. As he makes his way through the parking lot, it is revealed that he and Dawn got married 10 days after his loss at the 2000 Grand Prix; they were married for six years and had a son, and he retired in 2009. While mostly unknown today, he is one of the most influential pioneers in the MMA world.

At the end of the epilogue, he bids goodbye to the audience, gets in his car, and leaves.

== Cast ==
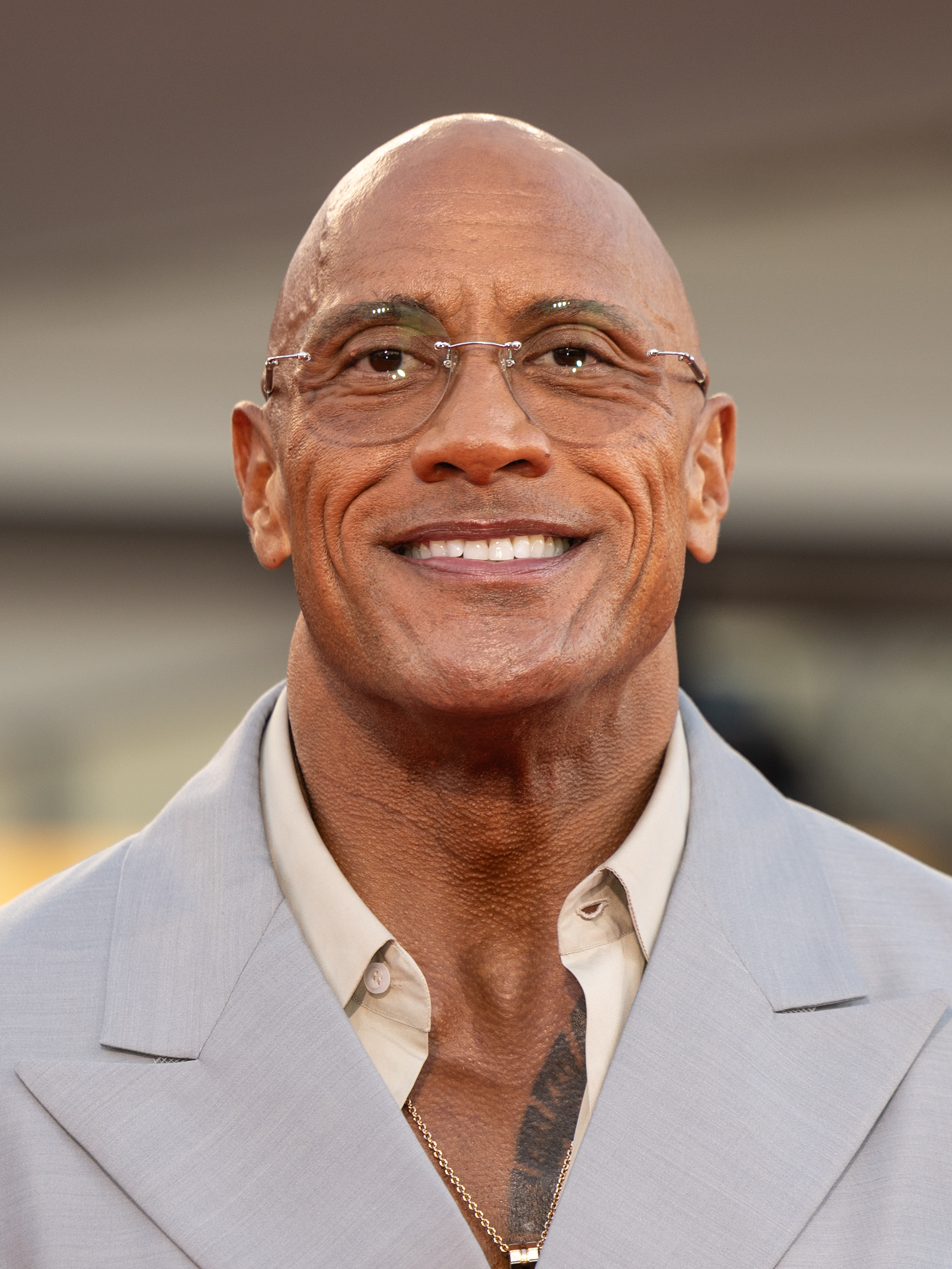
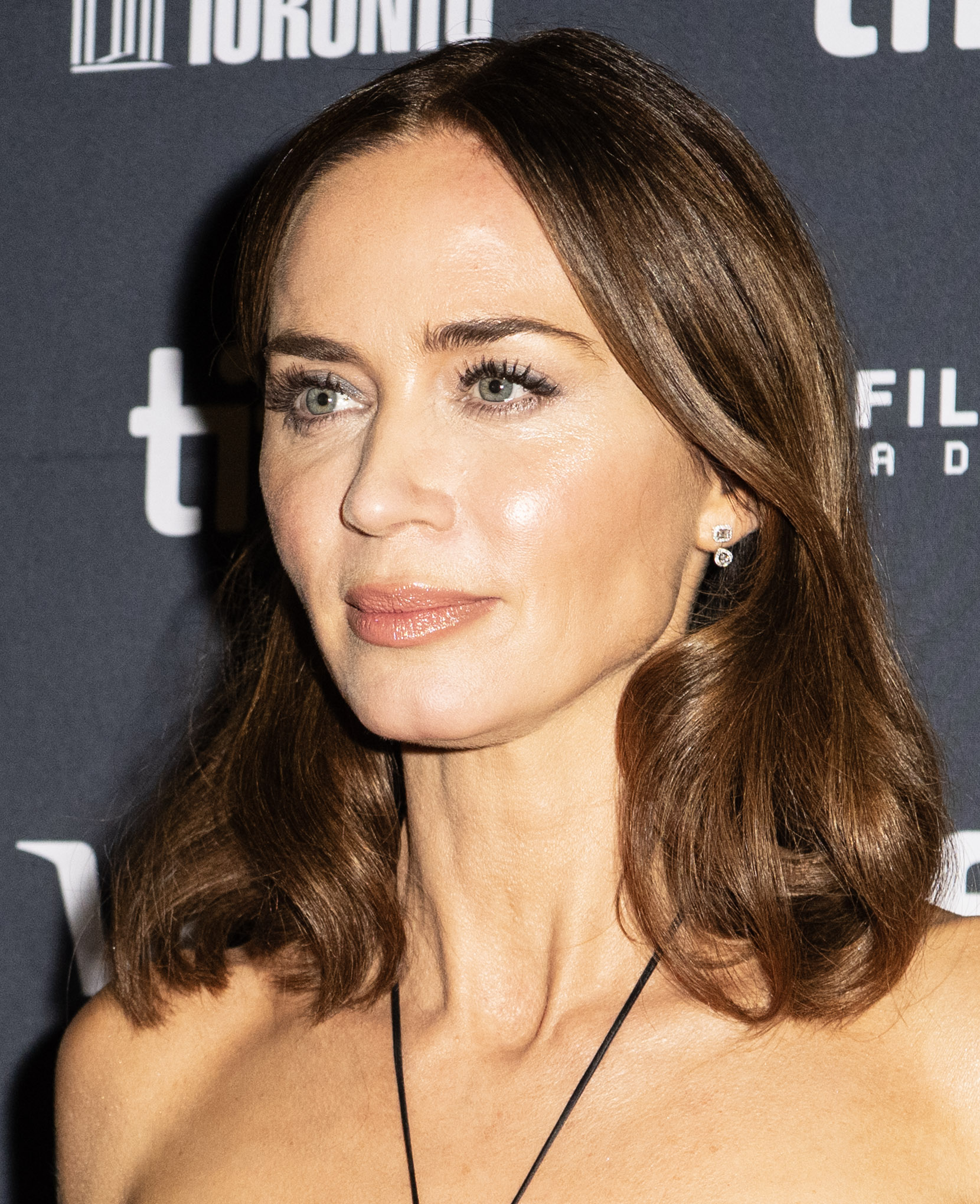
The film stars Dwayne Johnson and Emily Blunt in shared leading roles.
- Dwayne Johnson as Mark Kerr
  - Kerr also appears as himself in the ending scene.
- Emily Blunt as Dawn Staples
- Ryan Bader as Mark Coleman
- Bas Rutten as himself
- Oleksandr Usyk as Igor Vovchanchyn
- Olga Dzyurak as Igor's translator
- Lyndsey Gavin as Elizabeth Coleman
- Satoshi Ishii as Enson Inoue
- James Moontasri as Akira Shoji
- Yoko Hamamura as Kazuyuki Fujita
- Stephen Quadros as himself
- Paul Cheng as Masaaki Satake
- Cyborg Abreu as Fábio Gurgel
- Andre Tricoteux as Paul Varelans
- Marcus Aurélio as Mestre Hulk
- Whitney Moore as Jacqueline
- Paul Lazenby as Hans Nijman
- Jonathan Corbblah as UFC 1997 interviewer
- Nala Sinephro as "The Star-Spangled Banner" performer

== Production ==
In November 2019, it was announced that Dwayne Johnson would star in and produce a biographical sports drama film based on the life and career of Mark Kerr. In December 2023, it was announced that A24 would co-produce and distribute the film, with Benny Safdie writing and directing. On the red carpet for 96th Academy Awards, Johnson confirmed that Emily Blunt would star in the film as Kerr's wife Dawn Staples. Blunt was instrumental in connecting Safdie (her co-star in Oppenheimer) with Johnson (her co-star in Jungle Cruise). Lyndsey Gavin, Oleksandr Usyk, Ryan Bader, Bas Rutten, and Zoe Kosovic joined the cast in May 2024.

Principal photography ran from May 21 to August 7, 2024, spanning locations such as New Mexico, Tokyo, and Vancouver. The project was shot predominantly on 16mm film, with some scenes filmed using 70mm film as well as VHS cameras. Johnson was paid $4 million to star in the film.

=== Music ===
In late 2024, Johnson tweeted that Belgian musician Nala Sinephro would compose the score.

The film's score also includes the Cleaners from Venus track "Corridor of Dreams", which is played in its entirety during the pivotal scene in which Mark Kerr suffers a humbling loss.

== Release ==
The first trailer for The Smashing Machine was released on April 29, 2025. The film had its world premiere in competition at the 82nd Venice International Film Festival on September 1, 2025. It also screened at the Toronto International Film Festival on September 8, 2025. It was theatrically released in the United States and Canada on October 3, 2025.

== Reception ==
=== Box office ===
The Smashing Machine grossed $11.4 million in the United States and Canada, and $9.7 million in other territories, for a worldwide total of $21.1 million.

In its opening weekend, the film debuted to just $5.8 million, finishing in third and marking the lowest opening weekend of Johnson's career. This was attributed to limited demographic appeal, lackluster word-of-mouth, and a digital-centric advertisement campaign that failed to reach older adult audiences. Johnson responded to the opening box office numbers with: "In our storytelling world, you can't control box office results — but what I realized you can control is your performance, and your commitment to completely disappear and go elsewhere. And I will always run to that opportunity... Truth is this film has changed my life."

=== Critical response ===
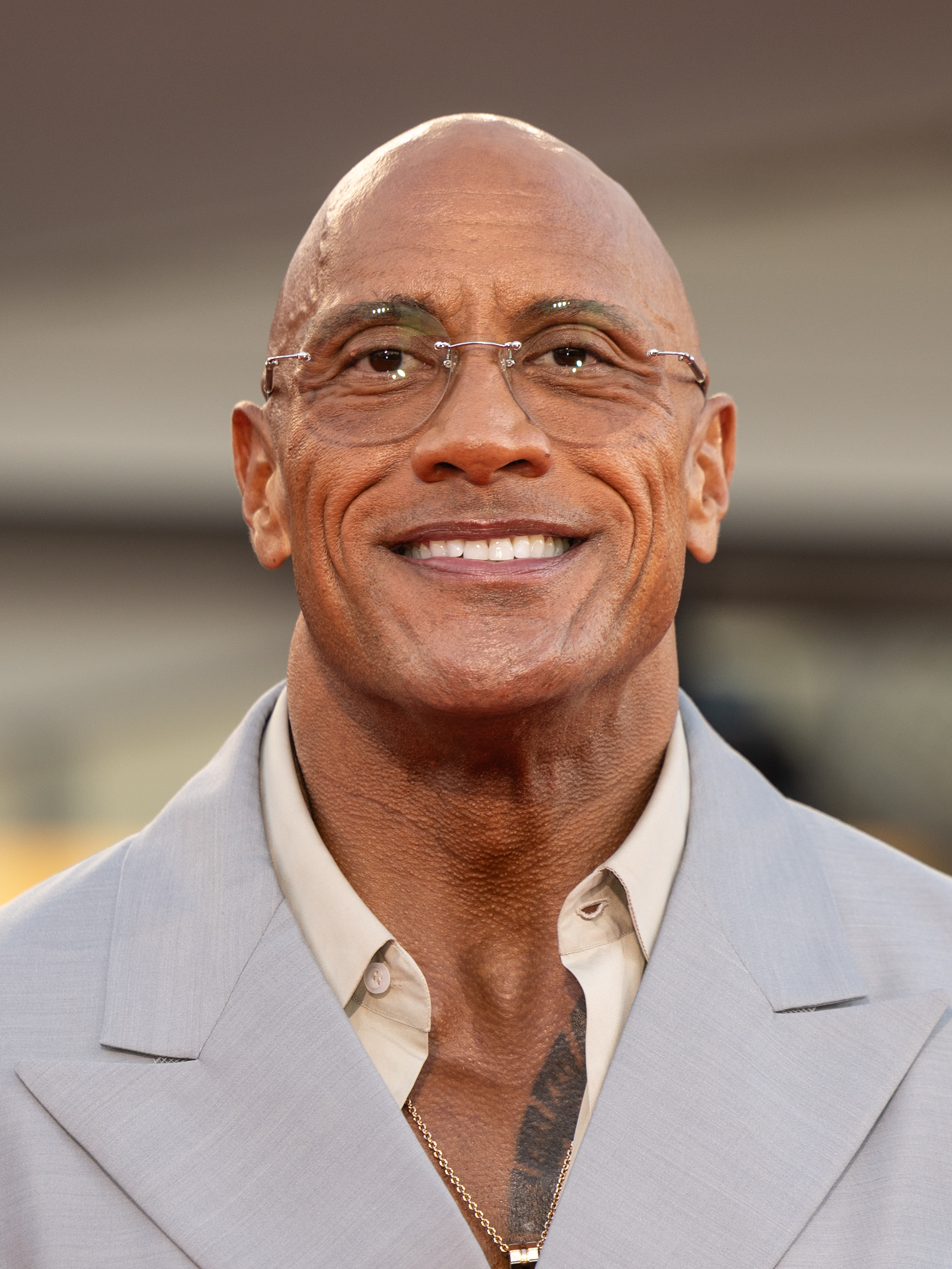
Dwayne Johnson garnered critical praise for his performance.

On the review aggregator website Rotten Tomatoes, 71% of 307 critics' reviews are positive, with an average rating of 6.4/10. The website's consensus reads: "Dwayne Johnson goes the distance with his transformative turn as Mark Kerr in The Smashing Machine, a gritty biopic that sidesteps cliché even at the expense of narrative satisfaction while still landing the dramatic body blows that count." Metacritic, which uses a weighted average, assigned the film a score of 65 out of 100, based on 56 critics, indicating "generally favorable" reviews. Audiences polled by CinemaScore gave the film an average grade of "B-" on an A+ to F scale.

Safdie was awarded the Silver Lion for Best Director at the Venice Film Festival following its world premiere.

=== Accolades ===
| Award | Date of ceremony | Category | Recipient(s) | Result | Ref. |
|---|---|---|---|---|---|
| Venice International Film Festival | September 6, 2025 | Golden Lion | Benny Safdie | Nominated | |
| Venice International Film Festival | September 6, 2025 | Silver Lion | Benny Safdie | Won | |
| Savannah Film Festival | October 1, 2025 | Maverick Director Award | Benny Safdie | Won | |
| Las Vegas Film Critics Society | December 19, 2025 | Best Supporting Actress | Emily Blunt | Nominated | |
| North Texas Film Critics Association | December 29, 2025 | Best Actor | Dwayne Johnson | Nominated | |
| Palm Springs International Film Festival | January 3, 2026 | Variety Creative Impact in Acting Award | Dwayne Johnson | Won | |
| Critics' Choice Movie Awards | January 4, 2026 | Best Makeup | Kazu Hiro, Felix Fox, and Mia Neal | Nominated | |
| Astra Film Awards | January 9, 2026 | Best Actor – Drama | Dwayne Johnson | Nominated | |
| AARP Movies for Grownups Awards | January 10, 2026 | Best Actor | Dwayne Johnson | Nominated | |
| Golden Globe Awards | January 11, 2026 | Best Actor – Drama | Dwayne Johnson | Nominated | |
| Golden Globe Awards | January 11, 2026 | Best Supporting Actress – Motion Picture | Emily Blunt | Nominated | |
| Black Reel Awards | February 16, 2026 | Outstanding Lead Performance | Dwayne Johnson | Nominated | |
| Black Reel Awards | February 16, 2026 | Outstanding Editing | Benny Safdie | Nominated | |
| Black Reel Awards | February 16, 2026 | Outstanding Hair and Makeup | Kazu Hiro, Felix Fox & Mia Neal | Nominated | |
| Black Reel Awards | February 16, 2026 | Outstanding Production Design | James Chinlund, production designer; Marcia Calosio, Mike Keel & Frank Okay, set decorators | Nominated | |
| Academy Awards | March 15, 2026 | Best Makeup and Hairstyling | Kazu Hiro, Glen Griffin and Bjoern Rehbein | Nominated | |

== See also ==
- List of mixed martial arts films
- The Smashing Machine: The Life and Times of Extreme Fighter Mark Kerr
