= 92nd Academy Awards =

- Official poster
- Date: February 9, 2020
- Site: Dolby Theatre; Los Angeles, California, U.S.
- Preshow hosts: Lily Aldridge; Tamron Hall; Elvis Mitchell; Billy Porter; Ryan Seacrest
- Produced by: Stephanie Allain; Lynette Howell Taylor
- Directed by: Glenn Weiss

Highlights
- Best Picture: Parasite
- Most awards: Parasite (4)
- Most nominations: Joker (11)

TV in the United States
- Network: ABC
- Duration: 3 hours, 36 minutes
- Ratings: 23.64 million 13.6% (Nielsen ratings)

The 92nd Academy Awards ceremony, presented by the Academy of Motion Picture Arts and Sciences (AMPAS), honored films released in 2019 and took place on February 9, 2020, at the Dolby Theatre in Hollywood, Los Angeles, beginning at 5:00 p.m. PST / 8:00 p.m. EST. During the ceremony, the AMPAS presented Academy Awards (commonly referred to as Oscars) in 24 categories. The ceremony, televised in the United States by ABC, was produced by Stephanie Allain and Lynette Howell Taylor and was directed by Glenn Weiss. Three months earlier in a ceremony at the Ray Dolby Ballroom of the Hollywood & Highland Center in Hollywood held on October 27, 2019, the Academy held its 11th Annual Governors Awards ceremony.

Parasite won four awards including Best Picture, becoming the first non-English language film to win that award. Other winners included 1917 with three awards, Ford v Ferrari, Joker, and Once Upon a Time in Hollywood with two awards, and American Factory, Bombshell, Hair Love, Jojo Rabbit, Judy, Learning to Skateboard in a Warzone (If You're a Girl), Little Women, Marriage Story, The Neighbors' Window, Rocketman, and Toy Story 4 with one. The telecast garnered 23.64 million viewers.

== Winners and nominees ==
The nominees for the 92nd Academy Awards were announced on January 13, 2020, at the David Geffen Theater of the Academy Museum of Motion Pictures in Los Angeles, California, by actors John Cho and Issa Rae. Joker led all nominees with eleven nominations; The Irishman, 1917, and Once Upon a Time in Hollywood tied for second with ten nominations each. This marked the first time in Oscars' history that four films each earned ten or more nominations.

The winners were announced during the awards ceremony on February 9, 2020. Parasite became the first non-English language film to win Best Picture. (Note: Although Parasite was the first non-English speaking film to win Best Picture at the Oscars, it is not to be confused with the first foreign film (produced by a company of a country that does not have English as its primary language) to win Best Picture, which was achieved by The Artist in 2012. The French-produced film was largely silent with French intertitles and contained a few spoken lines in English. The Academy dictates foreign language as the main qualification for international film, hence The Artist did not qualify. Further, while prior winners The Last Emperor and Slumdog Millionaire included significant amounts of non-English dialogue, they were considered as domestic productions.) It was also the sixth film nominated for both Best Picture and Best International Feature in the same year. (Note: Z, Life Is Beautiful, Crouching Tiger, Hidden Dragon, Amour, and Roma were the films that previously accomplished this feat.) Its four wins tied it with Fanny and Alexander and Crouching Tiger, Hidden Dragon as the most-awarded foreign language films in Academy Awards history. Parasite became the 12th film to win Best Picture without an acting nomination. With his wins in Best Picture, Director, and Original Screenplay, as well as his accepting of the award for International Feature Film on behalf of South Korea, Bong Joon Ho was the second person to collect four statuettes in a single ceremony since Walt Disney at the 26th Academy Awards held in 1954 and the first to do so for a single film. (Note: Technically, the country of the film is recognized as winner of the Best International Feature award. However, the award is accepted by the director on behalf of the country, and since 2014, the director's name is engraved on the statuette.)

As a result of Joaquin Phoenix winning Best Actor for his performance as the titular character in the film Joker, he and Heath Ledger, who previously won for playing the same character in 2008's The Dark Knight, became the second pair of actors to win for portraying the same character in two different films. (Note: Marlon Brando and Robert De Niro were the first pair of actors to achieve this feat. Brando won Best Actor for portraying Vito Corleone in 1972's The Godfather; De Niro won Best Supporting Actor for portraying a younger version of the same character in 1974's The Godfather Part II.) Scarlett Johansson was the twelfth actor to receive double acting nominations in the same year. With her nominations in Best Actress and Best Original Song for Harriet, Cynthia Erivo became the third consecutive and overall person to earn acting and songwriting nominations for the same film after Mary J. Blige for 2017's Mudbound and Lady Gaga for 2018's A Star Is Born, and the second consecutive and overall person (and the first person of color ever) to do so in a leading role. Best Original Score winner Hildur Guðnadóttir was the third woman to win for composing a musical score and the first one to do so for a dramatic musical score. (Note: From the 68th ceremony in 1996 until the 71st in 1999, the Best Original Score award was split into two categories: Best Original Dramatic Score and Best Original Comedy or Musical Score. During that time, composers Rachel Portman and Anne Dudley won awards in the Best Original Comedy or Musical Score category for their work on 1996's Emma and 1997's The Full Monty, respectively.) Honeyland became the first film to be nominated for both Best International Feature Film and Best Documentary Feature. John Williams became the first person to receive Oscar nominations in seven different decades (he was nominated in each decade from the 1960s to the 2020s).

=== Awards ===
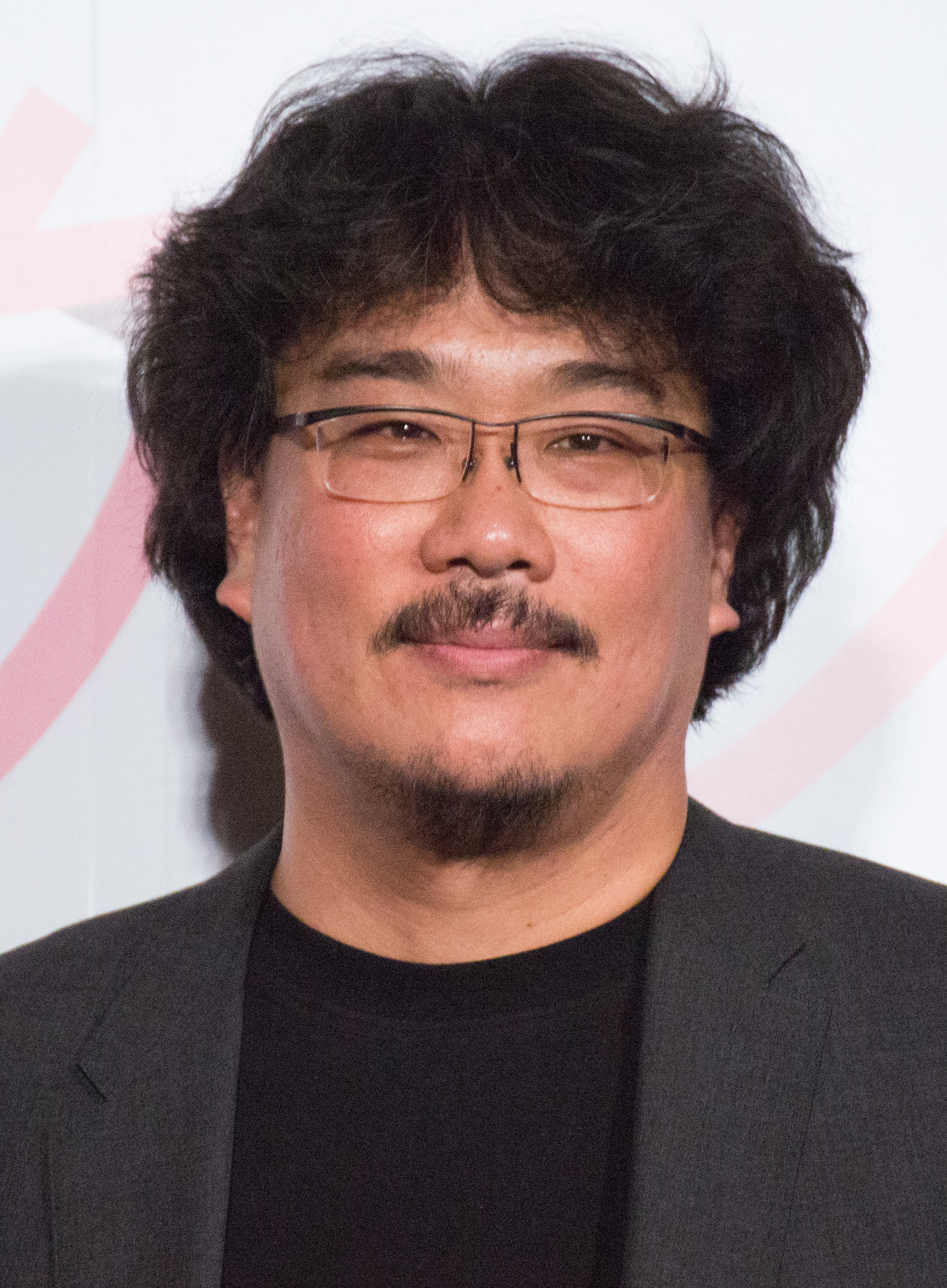
Bong Joon Ho, Best Picture and Best Original Screenplay co-winner, and Best Director and Best International Feature Film winner

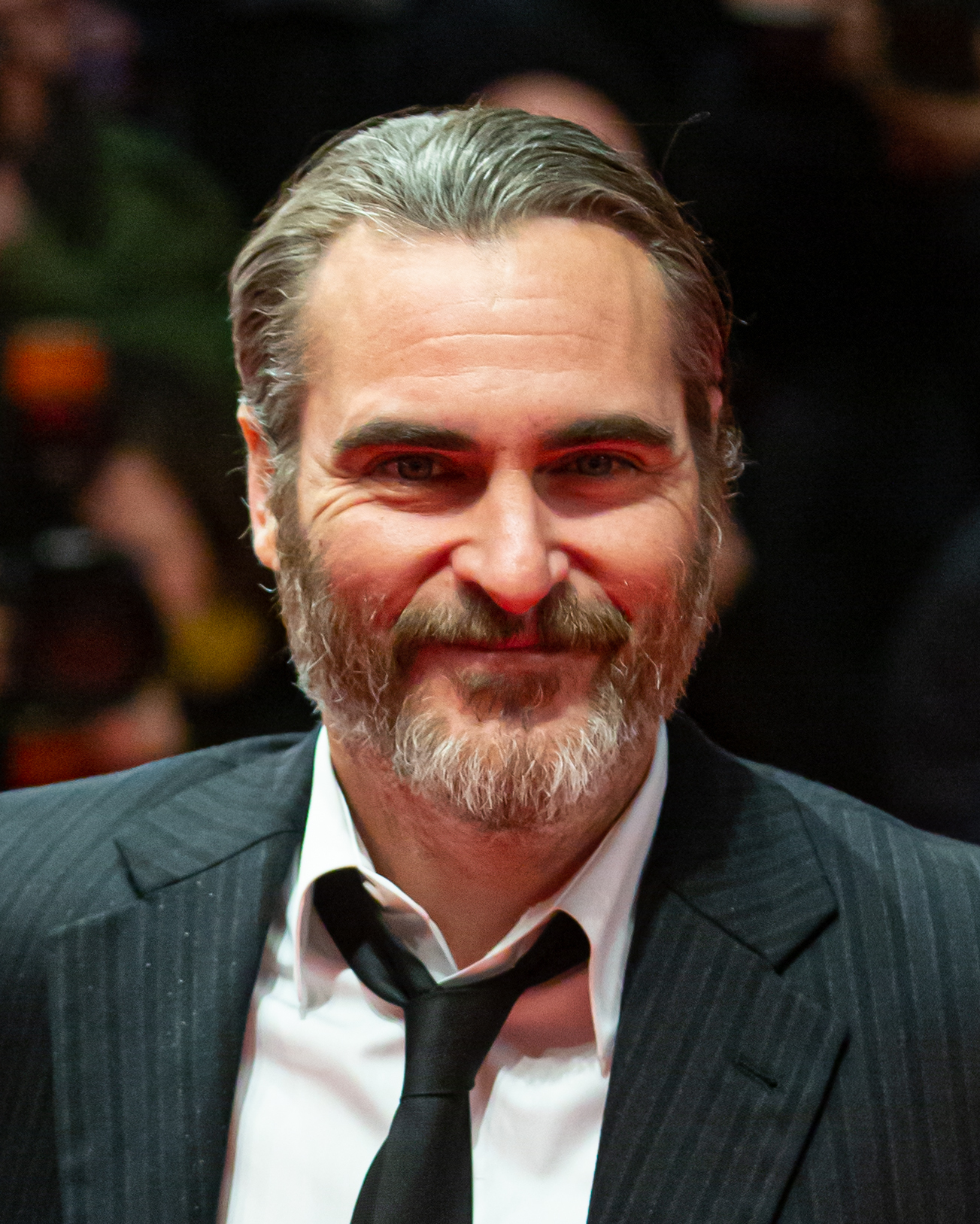
Joaquin Phoenix, Best Actor winner

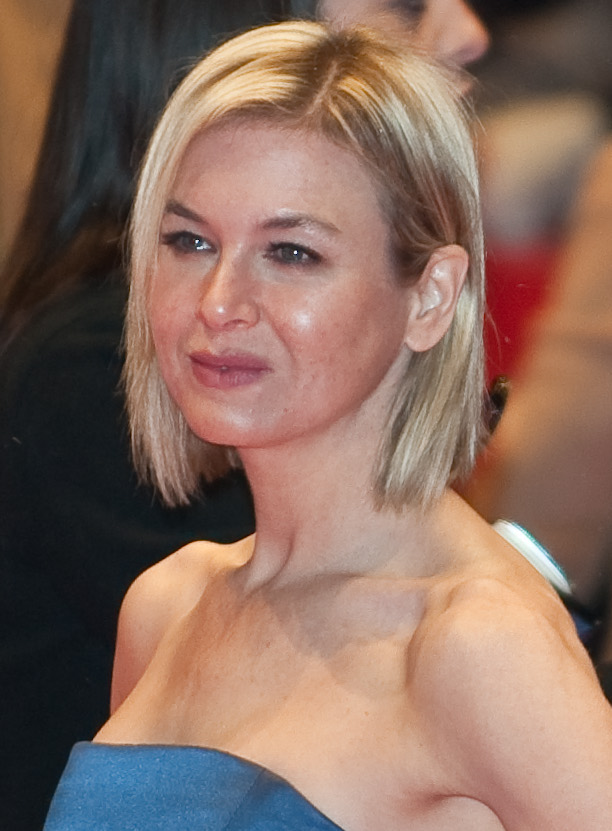
Renée Zellweger, Best Actress winner

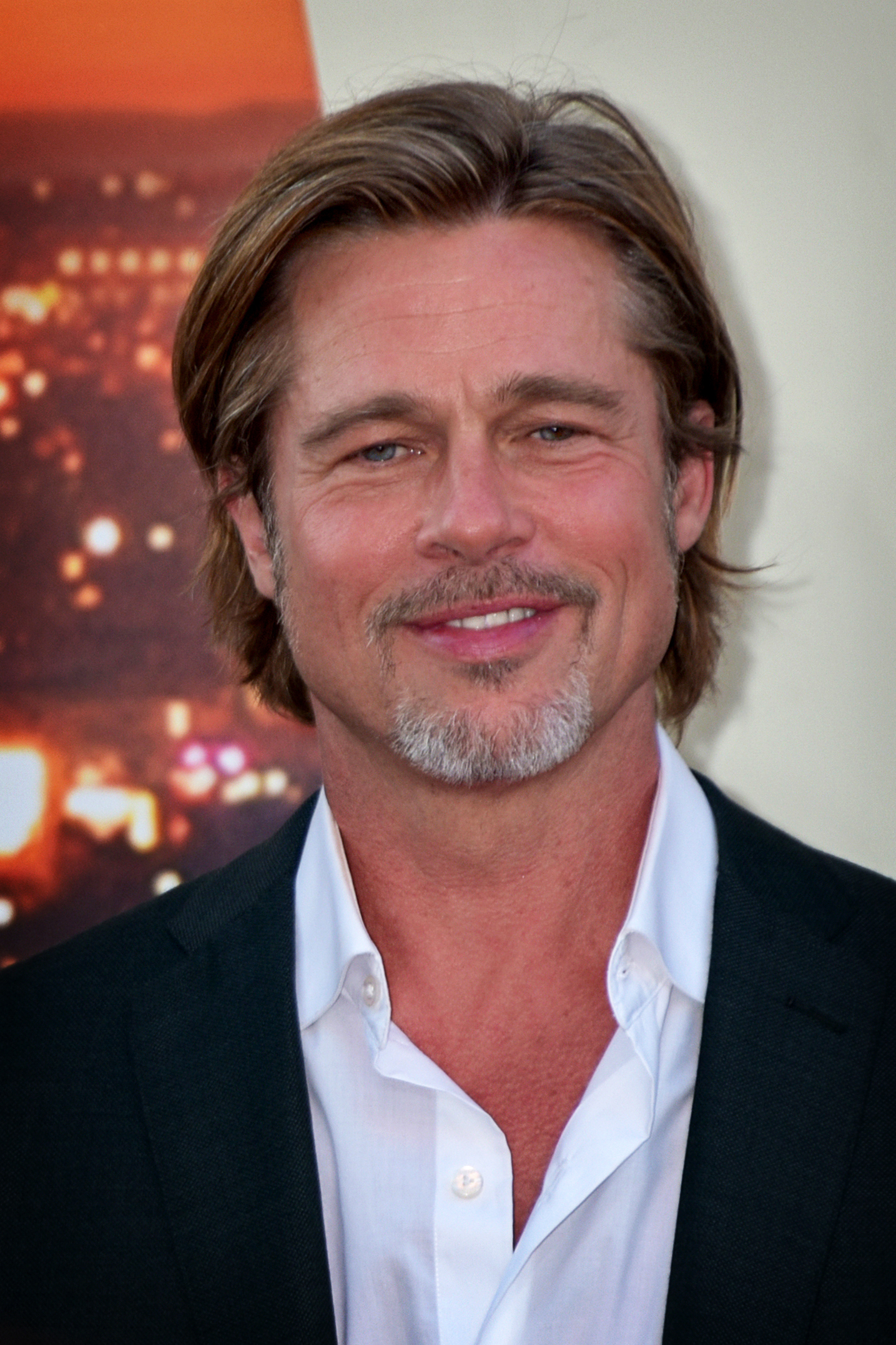
Brad Pitt, Best Supporting Actor winner

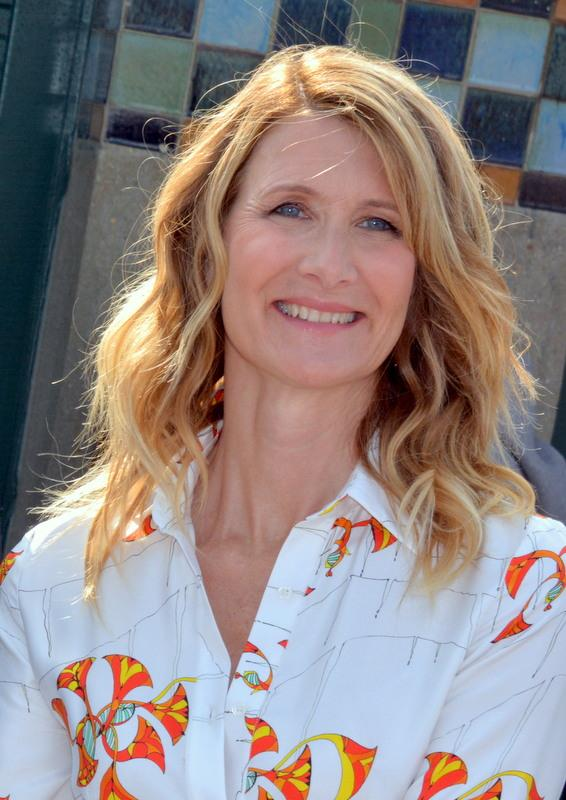
Laura Dern, Best Supporting Actress winner

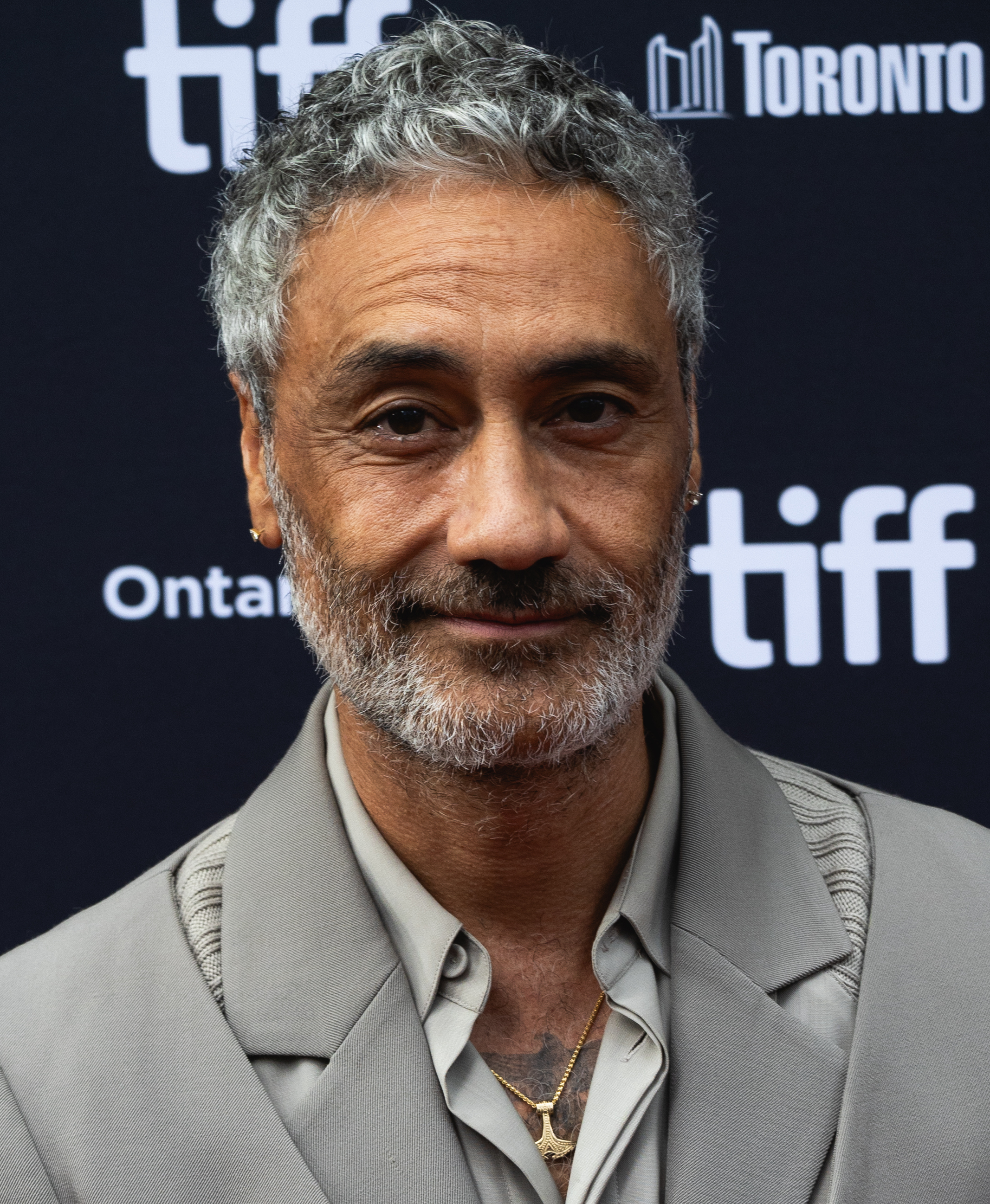
Taika Waititi, Best Adapted Screenplay winner

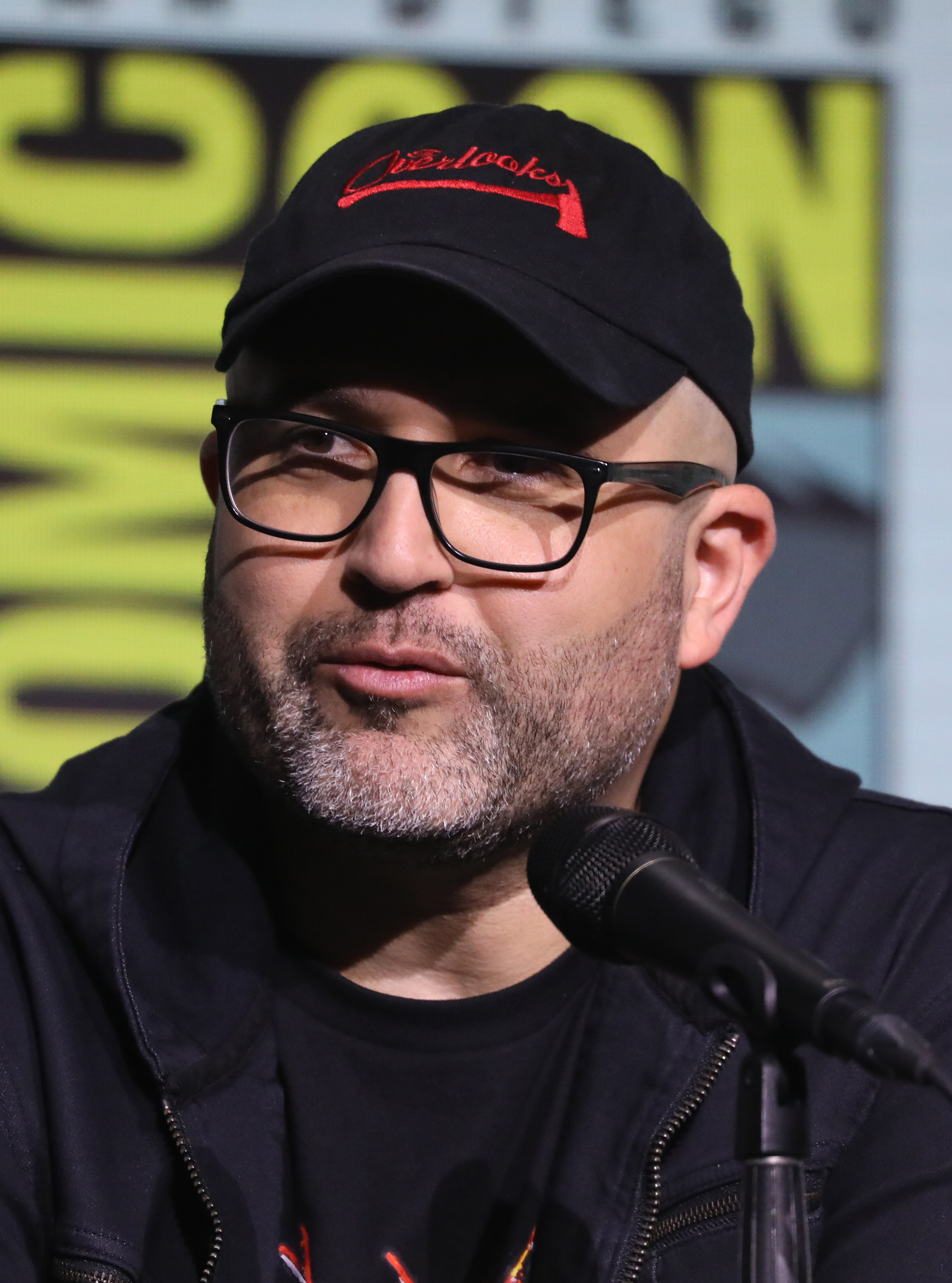
Josh Cooley, Best Animated Feature Film co-winner

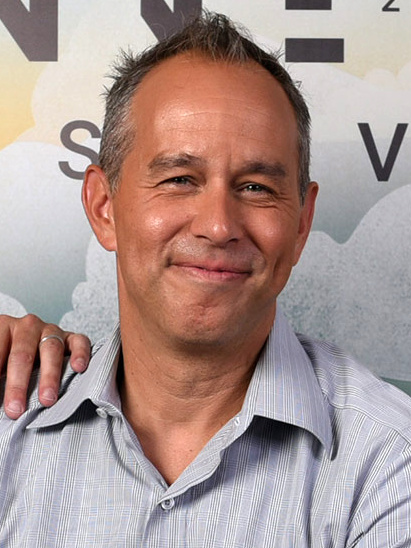
Jonas Rivera, Best Animated Feature Film co-winner

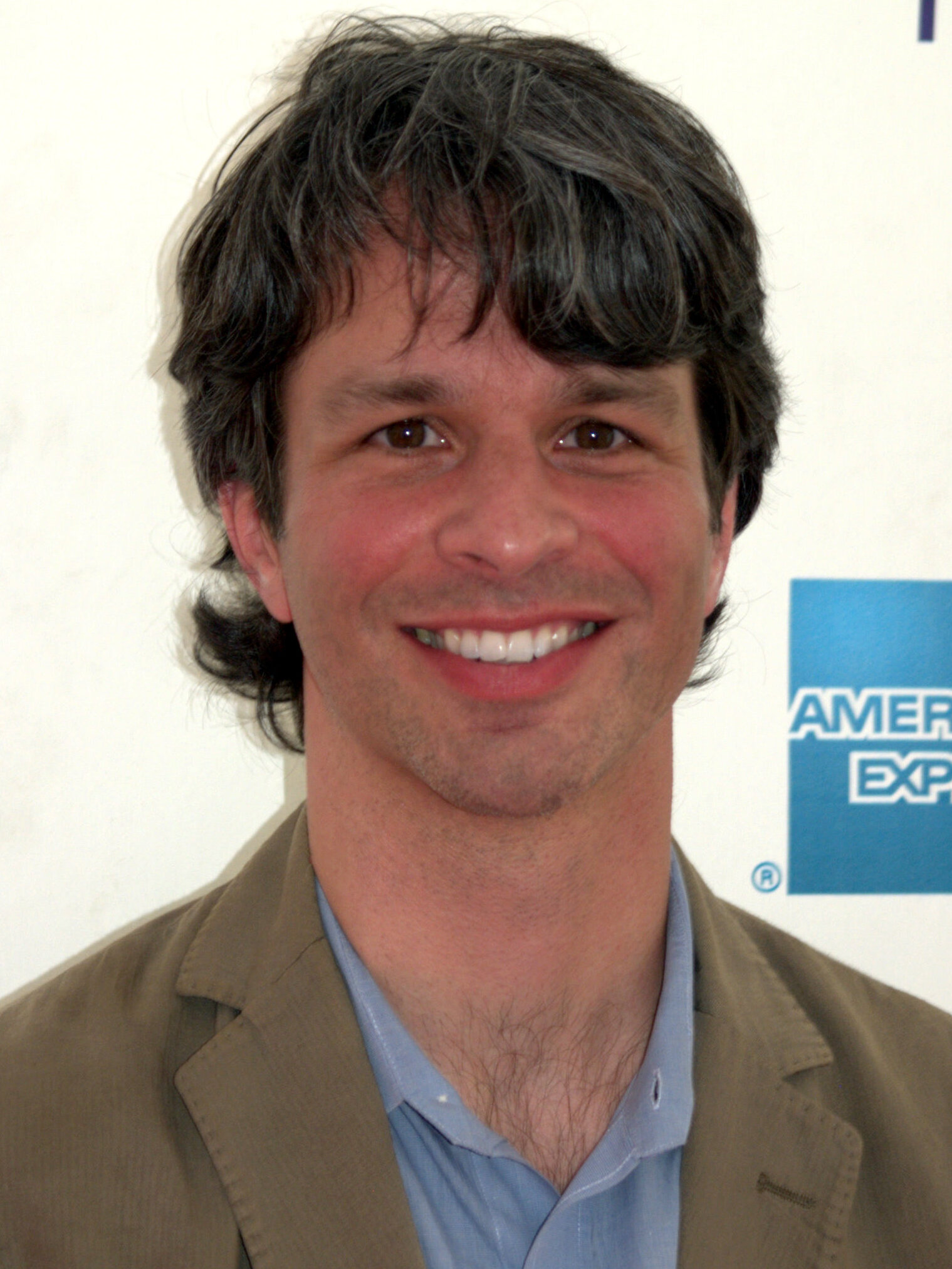
Marshall Curry, Best Live Action Short Film winner

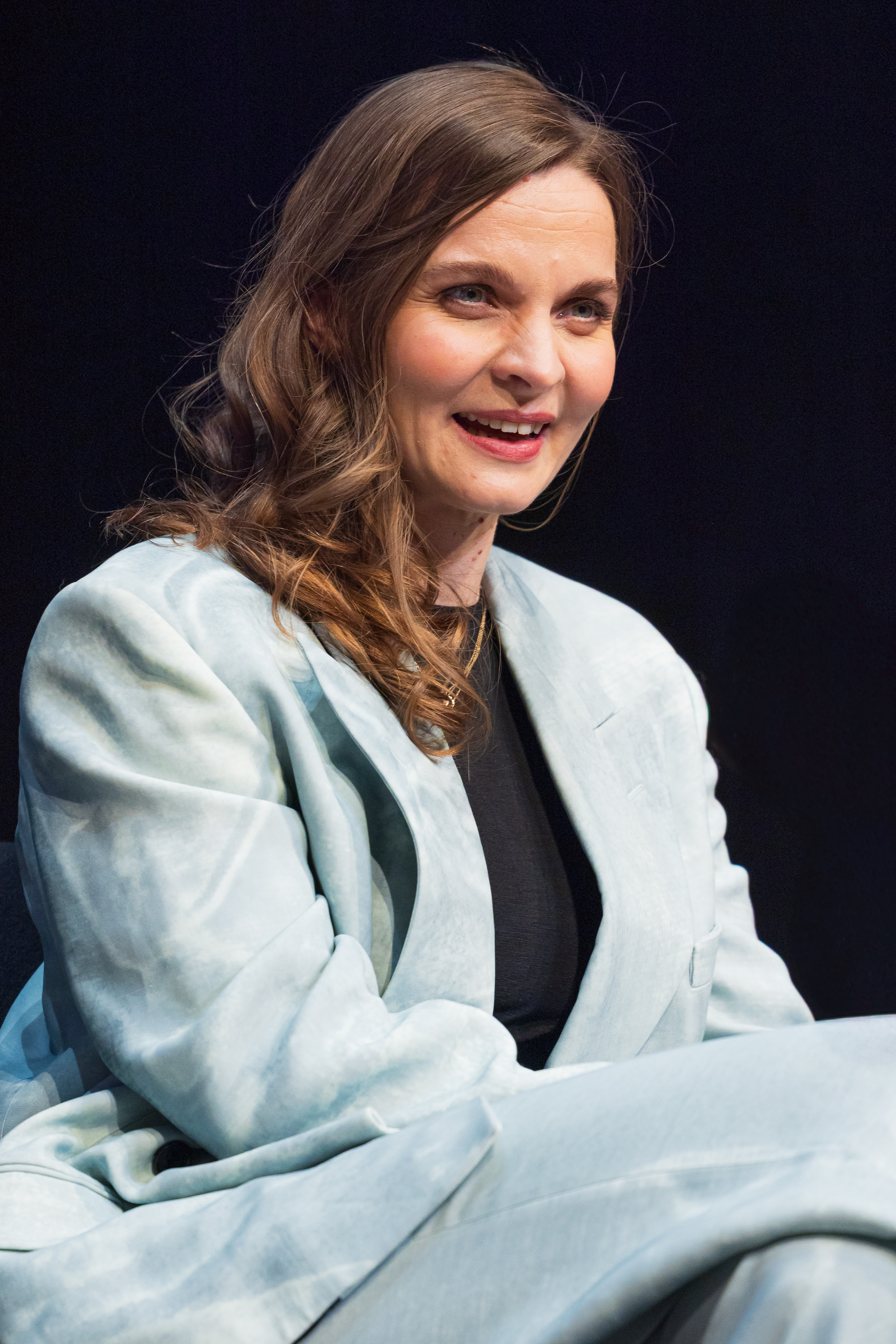
Hildur Guðnadóttir, Best Original Score winner

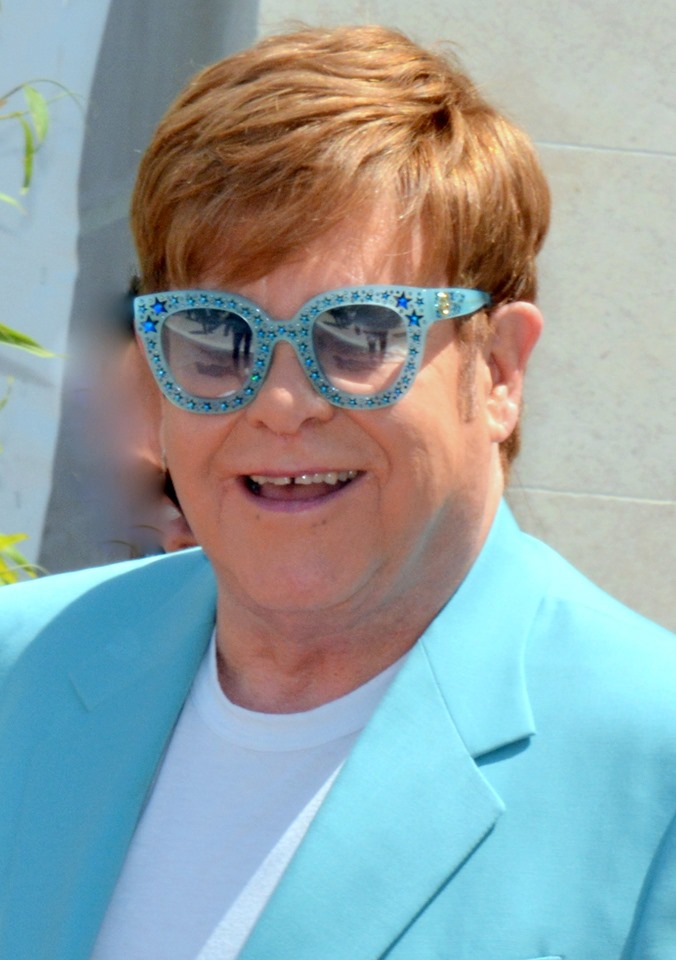
Elton John, Best Original Song co-winner

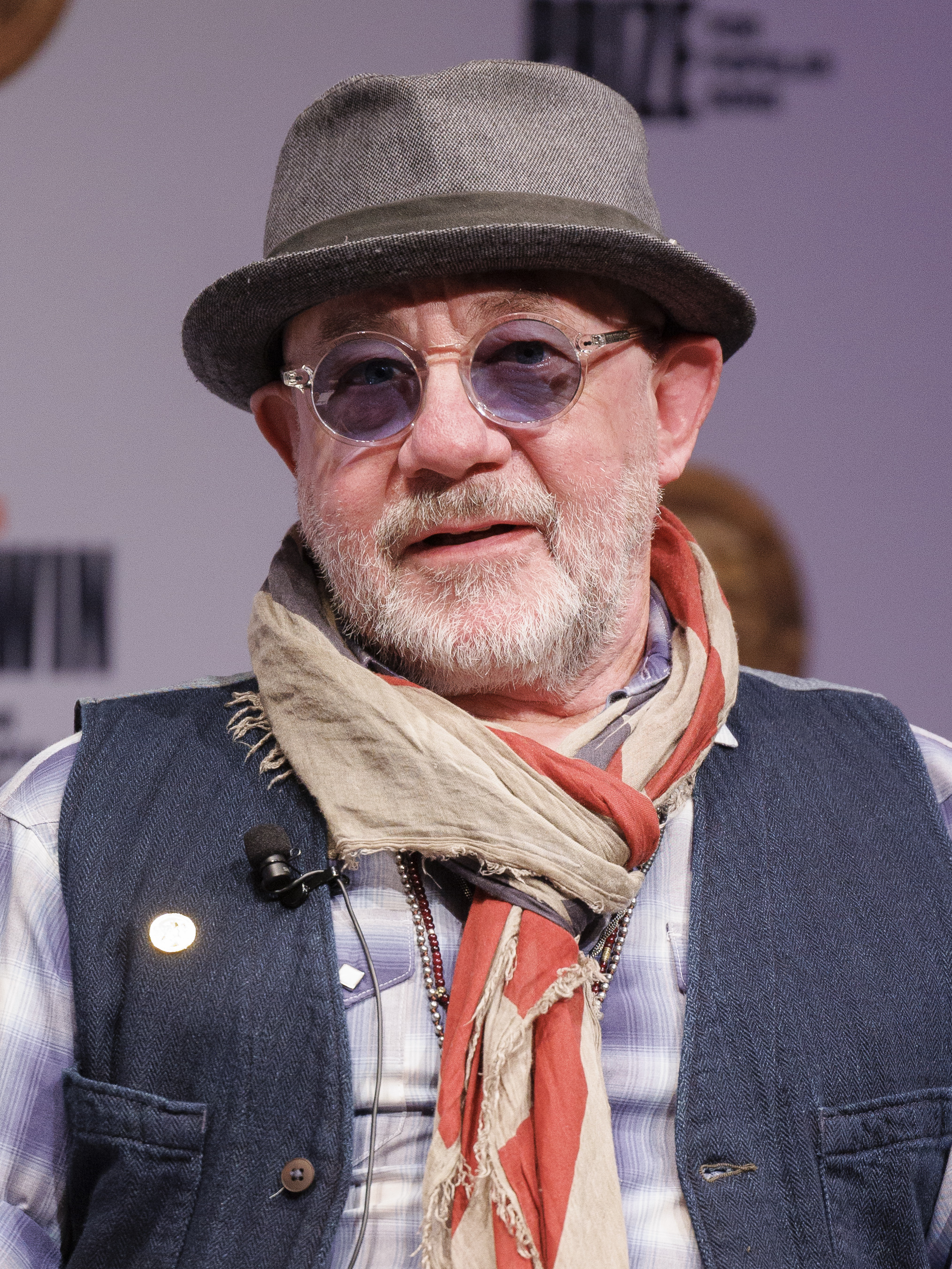
Bernie Taupin, Best Original Song co-winner

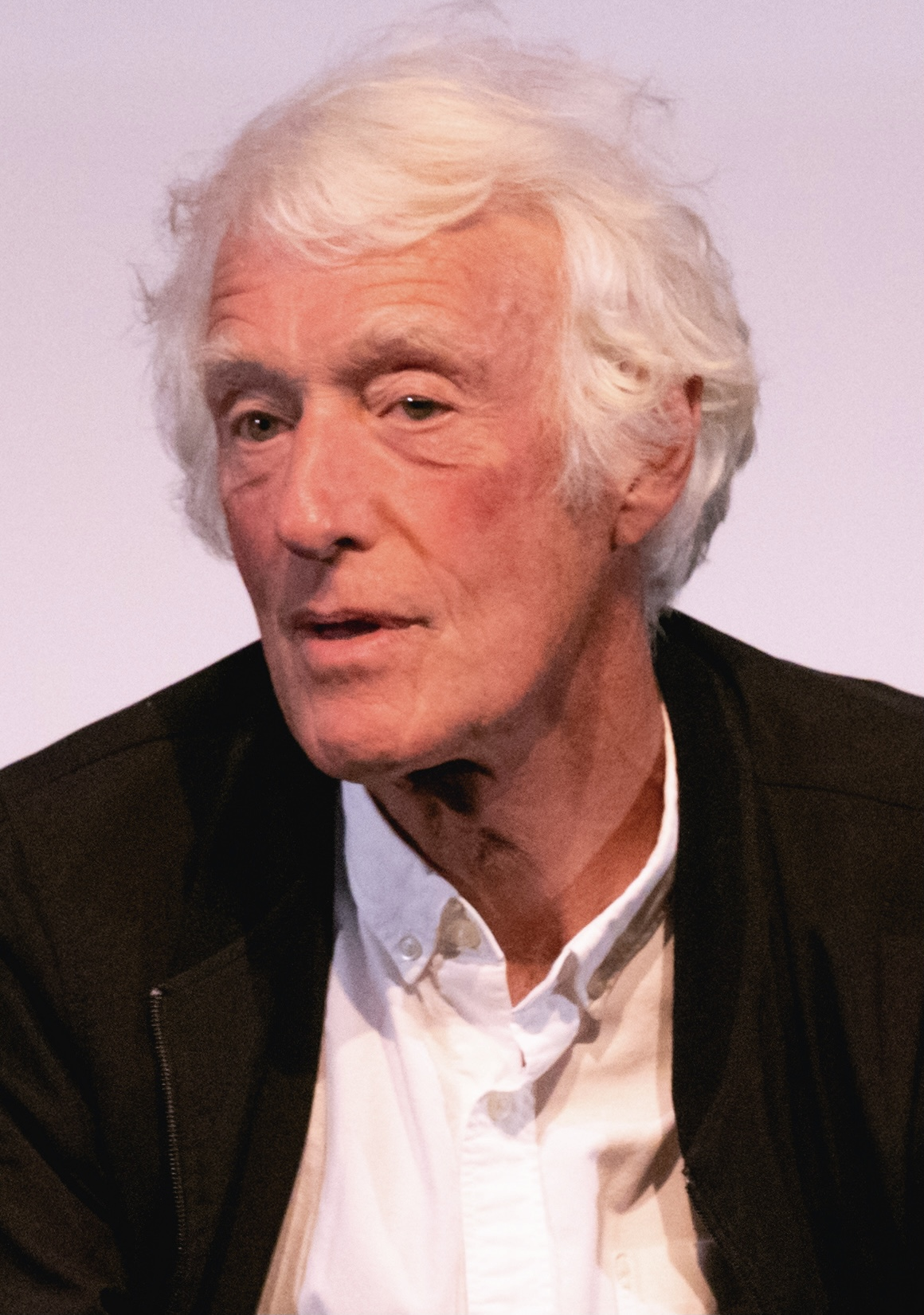
Roger Deakins, Best Cinematography winner

Winners are listed first, highlighted in boldface, and indicated with a double dagger (‡).

**Best Picture**: **Parasite – Kwak Sin Ae and Bong Joon Ho, producers**‡; Ford v Ferrari – Peter Chernin, Jenno Topping and James Mangold, producers; The Irishman – Martin Scorsese, Robert De Niro, Jane Rosenthal and Emma Tillinger Koskoff, producers; Jojo Rabbit – Carthew Neal, Taika Waititi and Chelsea Winstanley, producers; Joker – Todd Phillips, Bradley Cooper and Emma Tillinger Koskoff, producers; Little Women – Amy Pascal, producer; Marriage Story – Noah Baumbach and David Heyman, producers; 1917 – Sam Mendes, Pippa Harris, Jayne-Ann Tenggren and Callum McDougall, producers; Once Upon a Time in Hollywood – David Heyman, Shannon McIntosh and Quentin Tarantino, producers	**Best Directing**: **Bong Joon Ho – Parasite**‡; Martin Scorsese – The Irishman; Todd Phillips – Joker; Sam Mendes – 1917; Quentin Tarantino – Once Upon a Time in Hollywood
**Best Actor in a Leading Role**: **Joaquin Phoenix – Joker as Arthur Fleck / Joker**‡; Antonio Banderas – Pain and Glory as Salvador Mallo; Leonardo DiCaprio – Once Upon a Time in Hollywood as Rick Dalton; Adam Driver – Marriage Story as Charlie Barber; Jonathan Pryce – The Two Popes as Cardinal Jorge Mario Bergoglio	**Best Actress in a Leading Role**: **Renée Zellweger – Judy as Judy Garland**‡; Cynthia Erivo – Harriet as Harriet Tubman; Scarlett Johansson – Marriage Story as Nicole Barber; Saoirse Ronan – Little Women as Josephine "Jo" March; Charlize Theron – Bombshell as Megyn Kelly
**Best Actor in a Supporting Role**: **Brad Pitt – Once Upon a Time in Hollywood as Cliff Booth**‡; Tom Hanks – A Beautiful Day in the Neighborhood as Fred Rogers; Anthony Hopkins – The Two Popes as Pope Benedict XVI; Al Pacino – The Irishman as Jimmy Hoffa; Joe Pesci – The Irishman as Russell Bufalino	**Best Actress in a Supporting Role**: **Laura Dern – Marriage Story as Nora Fanshaw**‡; Kathy Bates – Richard Jewell as Barbara "Bobi" Jewell; Scarlett Johansson – Jojo Rabbit as Rosie Betzler; Florence Pugh – Little Women as Amy March; Margot Robbie – Bombshell as Kayla Pospisil
**Best Writing (Original Screenplay)**: **Parasite – Screenplay by Bong Joon Ho and Han Jin Won; story by Bong Joon Ho**‡; Knives Out – Rian Johnson; Marriage Story – Noah Baumbach; 1917 – Sam Mendes and Krysty Wilson-Cairns; Once Upon a Time in Hollywood – Quentin Tarantino	**Best Writing (Adapted Screenplay)**: **Jojo Rabbit – Taika Waititi; based on the novel Caging Skies by Christine Leunens‡**; The Irishman – Steven Zaillian; based on the book I Heard You Paint Houses by Charles Brandt; Joker – Todd Phillips and Scott Silver; based on characters created by Bill Finger, Bob Kane and Jerry Robinson; Little Women – Greta Gerwig; based on the novel by Louisa May Alcott; The Two Popes – Anthony McCarten; based on his play The Pope
**Best Animated Feature Film**: **Toy Story 4 – Josh Cooley, Mark Nielsen and Jonas Rivera**‡; How to Train Your Dragon: The Hidden World – Dean DeBlois, Bradford Lewis and Bonnie Arnold; I Lost My Body – Jérémy Clapin and Marc du Pontavice; Klaus – Sergio Pablos, Jinko Gotoh and Marisa Román; Missing Link – Chris Butler, Arianne Sutner and Travis Knight	**Best International Feature Film**: **Parasite (South Korea) in Korean – directed by Bong Joon Ho**‡; Corpus Christi (Poland) in Polish – directed by Jan Komasa; Honeyland (North Macedonia) in Turkish and Macedonian – directed by Tamara Kotevska and Ljubomir Stefanov; Les Misérables (France) in French – directed by Ladj Ly; Pain and Glory (Spain) in Spanish – directed by Pedro Almodóvar
**Best Documentary (Feature)**: **American Factory – Steven Bognar, Julia Reichert and Jeff Reichert**‡; The Cave – Feras Fayyad, Kirstine Barfod and Sigrid Dyekjær; The Edge of Democracy – Petra Costa, Joanna Natasegara, Shane Boris and Tiago Pavan; For Sama – Waad Al-Kateab and Edward Watts; Honeyland – Ljubomir Stefanov, Tamara Kotevska and Atanas Georgiev	**Best Documentary (Short Subject)**: **Learning to Skateboard in a Warzone (If You're a Girl) – Carol Dysinger and Elena Andreicheva**‡; In the Absence – Yi Seung-Jun and Gary Byung-Seok Kam; Life Overtakes Me – John Haptas and Kristine Samuelson; St. Louis Superman – Smriti Mundhra and Sami Khan; Walk Run Cha-Cha – Laura Nix and Colette Sandstedt
**Best Short Film (Live Action)**: **The Neighbors' Window – Marshall Curry**‡; Brotherhood – Meryam Joobeur and Maria Gracia Turgeon; Nefta Football Club – Yves Piat and Damien Megherbi; Saria – Bryan Buckley and Matt Lefebvre; A Sister – Delphine Girard	**Best Short Film (Animated)**: **Hair Love – Matthew A. Cherry and Karen Rupert Toliver**‡; Dcera (Daughter) – Daria Kashcheeva; Kitbull – Rosana Sullivan and Kathryn Hendrickson; Mémorable – Bruno Collet and Jean-François Le Corre; Sister – Siqi Song
**Best Music (Original Score)**: **Joker – Hildur Guðnadóttir**‡; Little Women – Alexandre Desplat; Marriage Story – Randy Newman; 1917 – Thomas Newman; Star Wars: The Rise of Skywalker – John Williams	**Best Music (Original Song)**: **"(I'm Gonna) Love Me Again" from Rocketman – Music by Elton John; lyrics by Bernie Taupin**‡; "I Can't Let You Throw Yourself Away" from Toy Story 4 – Music and lyrics by Randy Newman; "I'm Standing with You" from Breakthrough – Music and lyrics by Diane Warren; "Into the Unknown" from Frozen 2 – Music and lyrics by Kristen Anderson-Lopez and Robert Lopez; "Stand Up" from Harriet – Music and lyrics by Joshuah Brian Campbell and Cynthia Erivo
**Best Sound Editing**: **Ford v Ferrari – Donald Sylvester**‡; Joker – Alan Robert Murray; 1917 – Oliver Tarney and Rachael Tate; Once Upon a Time in Hollywood – Wylie Stateman; Star Wars: The Rise of Skywalker – Matthew Wood and David Acord	**Best Sound Mixing**: **1917 – Mark Taylor and Stuart Wilson**‡; Ad Astra – Gary Rydstrom, Tom Johnson and Mark Ulano; Ford v Ferrari – Paul Massey, David Giammarco and Steven A. Morrow; Joker – Tom Ozanich, Dean Zupancic and Tod Maitland; Once Upon a Time in Hollywood – Michael Minkler, Christian P. Minkler and Mark Ulano
**Best Production Design**: **Once Upon a Time in Hollywood – Production Design: Barbara Ling; Set Decoration: Nancy Haigh**‡; The Irishman – Production Design: Bob Shaw; Set Decoration: Regina Graves; Jojo Rabbit – Production Design: Ra Vincent; Set Decoration: Nora Sopková; 1917 – Production Design: Dennis Gassner; Set Decoration: Lee Sandales; Parasite – Production Design: Lee Ha Jun; Set Decoration: Cho Won Woo	**Best Cinematography**: **1917 – Roger Deakins**‡; The Irishman – Rodrigo Prieto; Joker – Lawrence Sher; The Lighthouse – Jarin Blaschke; Once Upon a Time in Hollywood – Robert Richardson
**Best Makeup and Hairstyling**: **Bombshell – Kazu Hiro, Anne Morgan and Vivian Baker**‡; Joker – Nicki Ledermann and Kay Georgiou; Judy – Jeremy Woodhead; Maleficent: Mistress of Evil – Paul Gooch, Arjen Tuiten and David White; 1917 – Naomi Donne, Tristan Versluis and Rebecca Cole	**Best Costume Design**: **Little Women – Jacqueline Durran**‡; The Irishman – Sandy Powell and Christopher Peterson; Jojo Rabbit – Mayes C. Rubeo; Joker – Mark Bridges; Once Upon a Time in Hollywood – Arianne Phillips
**Best Film Editing**: **Ford v Ferrari – Michael McCusker and Andrew Buckland**‡; The Irishman – Thelma Schoonmaker; Jojo Rabbit – Tom Eagles; Joker – Jeff Groth; Parasite – Yang Jin-mo	**Best Visual Effects**: **1917 – Guillaume Rocheron, Greg Butler and Dominic Tuohy**‡; Avengers: Endgame – Dan DeLeeuw, Russell Earl, Matt Aitken and Dan Sudick; The Irishman – Pablo Helman, Leandro Estebecorena, Nelson Sepulveda-Fauser and Stephane Grabli; The Lion King – Robert Legato, Adam Valdez, Andrew R. Jones and Elliot Newman; Star Wars: The Rise of Skywalker – Roger Guyett, Neal Scanlan, Patrick Tubach and Dominic Tuohy

=== Governors Awards ===
The Academy held its 11th annual Governors Awards ceremony on October 27, 2019, during which the following awards were presented:

==== Honorary Awards ====
- David Lynch – "For fearlessly breaking boundaries in pursuit of his singular cinematic vision."
- Wes Studi – "In recognition of the power and craft he brings to his indelible film portrayals and for his steadfast support of the Native American community."
- Lina Wertmüller – "For her provocative disruption of political and social norms delivered with bravery through her weapon of choice: the camera lens."

==== Jean Hersholt Humanitarian Award ====
- Geena Davis – For her work fighting for gender-parity in media through her Geena Davis Institute on Gender in Media.

=== Films with multiple nominations and awards ===
Films that received multiple nominations
Nominations	Film
11	Joker
10	The Irishman
10	1917
10	Once Upon a Time in Hollywood
6	Jojo Rabbit
6	Little Women
6	Marriage Story
6	Parasite
4	Ford v Ferrari
3	Bombshell
3	Star Wars: The Rise of Skywalker
3	The Two Popes
2	Harriet
2	Honeyland
2	Judy
2	Pain and Glory
2	Toy Story 4

Films that received multiple awards
Awards	Film
4	Parasite
3	1917
2	Ford v Ferrari
2	Joker
2	Once Upon a Time in Hollywood

== Presenters and performers ==
The following individuals, listed in order of appearance, presented awards or performed musical numbers.

=== Presenters ===
Name	Role
Melissa Disney	Served as announcer for the 92nd annual Academy Awards
Steve Martin; Chris Rock	Performed opening comedy dialogue and introduced presenter Regina King
Regina King	Presented the award for Best Supporting Actor
Beanie Feldstein	Introduced presenter Mindy Kaling
Mindy Kaling	Presented the awards for Best Animated Feature and Best Animated Short Film
Josh Gad	Introduced the performance of Best Original Song nominee "Into the Unknown"
Kelly Marie Tran	Introduced presenters Diane Keaton and Keanu Reeves
Diane Keaton; Keanu Reeves	Presented the award for Best Original Screenplay
Timothée Chalamet; Natalie Portman	Presented the award for Best Adapted Screenplay
Shia LaBeouf; Zack Gottsagen	Presented the award for Best Live Action Short Film
Maya Rudolph; Kristen Wiig	Presented the awards for Best Production Design and Best Costume Design
Mark Ruffalo	Presented the awards for Best Documentary Feature and Best Documentary Short Subject
Mahershala Ali	Presented the award for Best Supporting Actress
Anthony Ramos	Introduced presenter Lin-Manuel Miranda
Lin-Manuel Miranda	Presented the "Music in Film" montage
Salma Hayek Pinault; Oscar Isaac	Presented the awards for Best Sound Editing and Best Sound Mixing
Utkarsh Ambudkar	Introduced presenters Will Ferrell and Julia Louis-Dreyfus
Will Ferrell; Julia Louis-Dreyfus	Presented the awards for Best Cinematography and Best Film Editing
David Rubin (AMPAS president)	Introduced presenter Tom Hanks
Tom Hanks	Presented a segment announcing the opening of the Academy Museum of Motion Pictures
Zazie Beetz	Introduced the performance of Best Original Song nominee "Stand Up"
James Corden; Rebel Wilson	Presented the award for Best Visual Effects
Sandra Oh; Ray Romano	Presented the award for Best Makeup and Hairstyling
Penélope Cruz	Presented the award for Best International Feature Film
Taika Waititi	Introduced presenters Gal Gadot, Sigourney Weaver and Brie Larson
Gal Gadot; Brie Larson; Sigourney Weaver	Presented the awards for Best Original Score and Best Original Song
Spike Lee	Presented the award for Best Director
Steven Spielberg	Presented the "In Memoriam" tribute
George MacKay	Introduced presenter Olivia Colman
Olivia Colman	Presented the award for Best Actor
Rami Malek	Presented the award for Best Actress
Jane Fonda	Presented the award for Best Picture

=== Performers ===
Name(s)	Role	Performed
Rickey Minor	Musical director Conductor	Orchestral
Janelle Monáe; Billy Porter	Performers	"Won't You Be My Neighbor?" "Come Alive (The War of the Roses)" "I'm Still Standing"
Idina Menzel; Aurora; Maria Lucia Heiberg Rosenberg; Willemijn Verkaik; Takako Matsu; Carmen García Sáenz; Lisa Stokke; Kasia Łaska; Anna Buturlina; Gisela; Gam Wichayanee	Performers	"Into the Unknown" from Frozen 2
Chrissy Metz	Performer	"I'm Standing with You" from Breakthrough
Eminem	Performer	"Lose Yourself" as part of the "Music in Film" tribute
Randy Newman	Performer	"I Can't Let You Throw Yourself Away" from Toy Story 4
Utkarsh Ambudkar	Performer	"Oscars Recap Rap"
Cynthia Erivo	Performer	"Stand Up" from Harriet
Elton John	Performer	"(I'm Gonna) Love Me Again" from Rocketman
Eímear Noone	Conductor	Conducted orchestra during performance of selections of Best Original Score nominees
Billie Eilish; Finneas O'Connell	Performers	"Yesterday" during the annual "In Memoriam" tribute

== Ceremony ==
Originally in April 2017, the Academy had scheduled the 92nd ceremony for February 23, 2020. However, due to record low television viewership and ratings attained by recent Oscar broadcasts, the AMPAS Board of Governors decided to move the date for the 2020 gala by two weeks to February 9 in hopes of combating film awards season fatigue. This marked the earliest date on which the ceremony has been held. In November 2019, the Academy announced that the show would be produced by Stephanie Allain and Lynette Howell Taylor. In January 2020, Glenn Weiss was announced as the director for the fifth year in a row. Furthermore, in light of the recent success of last year's hostless ceremony that resulted in an improvement in ratings, ABC entertainment president Karey Burke announced in January 2020 that the event would proceed without a host for the second consecutive year. Burke stated the ceremony would feature "huge entertainment values, big musical numbers, comedy, and star power".

Several other people participated in the production of the ceremony. Production designer Jason Sherwood designed an ambitiously technological stage design for the ceremony which prominently featured a sculptural shell that protruded toward the audience and 1,100 Swarovski crystals. Furthermore, the stage itself was used to display movie clips and nominations graphics packages instead of projecting those images onto a regular rectangular screen. Rickey Minor served as musical director and conductor for the ceremony. Musician Questlove served as an in-house DJ during the gala. Rapper Eminem made a surprise appearance during the ceremony to perform his Oscar-winning song "Lose Yourself" from the 2002 film 8 Mile after being absent from the 75th ceremony in 2003 to perform the song. During the performance of "Into the Unknown", several foreign language excerpts were sung by the actresses who performed it in local versions. During the performance of excerpts from the Best Original Score nominees, Eímear Noone became the first woman to conduct the orchestra during an Oscar ceremony.

=== Category renaming and rule changes ===
During its board of directors meeting in April 2019, the Academy voted to rename the Best Foreign Language Film category to Best International Feature Film. In a press release justifying the name change, International Feature Film Committee co-chairs Larry Karaszewski and Diane Weyermann stated, "We have noted that the reference to 'foreign' is outdated within the global filmmaking community. We believe that international feature film better represents this category, and promotes a positive and inclusive view of filmmaking, and the art of film as a universal experience." However, the requirement for nominees to have the majority of their dialogue be in a language other than English remained in force.

Rule changes were also approved by the AMPAS Board of Directors. The category of Best Makeup and Hairstyling was expanded from a roster consisting of three nominees to five nominees, with the pre-nominations shortlist also expanded from seven films to ten. In addition, the Academy voted to drop the requirement of eight theatrically-released animated feature films in a calendar year in order for the category of Best Animated Feature to be activated, and nominations voting in that category would be open to all active Short Films and Animation Branch members. Finally, prospective nominees for Best Animated Short Film and Best Live Action Short Film could now premiere theatrically in either Los Angeles County or New York City in order to be eligible for consideration.

=== Box office performance of Best Picture nominees ===
When the nominations were announced, seven of the nine films nominated for Best Picture had earned a combined gross of $747.2 million at the American and Canadian box offices at the time. Joker was the highest-grossing film among the Best Picture nominees with $334 million in domestic box office receipts. Once Upon a Time in Hollywood came in second with $141.1 million; this was followed by Ford v. Ferrari ($111 million), Little Women ($74 million), 1917 ($39.2 million), Parasite ($25.4 million), and Jojo Rabbit ($22 million). Box office grosses for The Irishman and Marriage Story were unavailable due to their distributor Netflix's policy of refusing to release such figures.

=== Critical reviews ===
The show received a mixed reception from media publications. Some media outlets received the broadcast positively. Television critic James Poniewozik of The New York Times wrote, "The ceremony was most effective when it simply got out of the way of its stars' shine." He added, "At its absolute best, this Oscars succeeded with what you can't script: great artists being recognized, and recognizing others." Matthew Gilbert from The Boston Globe commented, "Sometimes, a few good moments are enough to get you there. And there were a few good ones throughout the Oscarcast Sunday night, which, like every Oscarcast ever, hosted or host-free, predictable or filled with surprises, jubilant or downbeat, was longer than it needed to be." Entertainment Weekly columnist Darren Franlch remarked, "The 2020 Oscars were a bit of a shambles, and we can definitely lose all the introducers next year. But the last hour had the quality of a well-deserved coronation. Four wins for Parasite? I was so happy that I lost myself."

Others were more critical of the show. Columnist Kristin Turnquist of The Oregonian quipped, "If the 2020 Oscars broadcast was competing for a 'Most Confusing Mess of an Awards Show' trophy, it really hit the mark. But that's the best that can be said for the 92nd Annual Academy Awards, which, despite a few surprises, was mostly predictable and seemed to go on forever." Television critic Lorraine Ali from the Los Angeles Times wrote, "This year's Oscars ceremony showed an art form in dire need of a relevancy check. Instead we got the biggest rap act of 2002 and a whole lot of jokes about the industry's inability to see its own stasis." Entertainment editor Bruce Miller of the Sioux City Journal noted, "Because it lacked focus (a host was needed), this year's Academy Awards rambled as much as Zellweger and Phoenix. Someone like Jimmy Kimmel or Ellen DeGeneres could have prevented some of the train wrecks and made more of its wins.

=== Ratings and reception ===
The American telecast on ABC drew in an average of 23.64 million people over its length, which was a 20% decrease from the previous year's ceremony. The show also earned lower Nielsen ratings compared to the previous ceremony with 13.6% of households watching the ceremony. In addition, it garnered a lower rating among viewers between ages 18-49 with a 5.3 rating among viewers in that demographic. Furthermore, some media outlets pointed out that the 62nd Grammy Awards that were broadcast on CBS two weeks earlier earned a higher 18-49 demographic rating with a 5.4 figure. It earned the lowest viewership for an Academy Award telecast since figures were compiled beginning with the 46th ceremony in 1974. However, it was the tenth most watched telecast in the United States in 2020, behind only sport events and The Masked Singer season 3 premiere.

In July 2020, the show received nine nominations at the 72nd Primetime Creative Arts Emmys. Two months later, the ceremony won two of those nominations for Outstanding Production Design for a Variety Special (Jason Sherwood and Alana Billingsley) and Outstanding Sound Mixing for a Variety Series or Special (Paul Sandweiss, Tommy Vicari, Biff Dawes, Pablo Munguia, Kristian Pedregon, Patrick Baltzell, Michael Parker, Christian Schrader, John Perez, Marc Repp, and Thomas Pesa).

== "In Memoriam" ==
The annual "In Memoriam" segment was presented by Steven Spielberg. Singers Billie Eilish and Finneas O'Connell performed the Beatles song "Yesterday" during the tribute.

- Kobe Bryant – athlete, producer
- Rip Torn – actor
- Barbara Hammer – filmmaker
- Patricia Blau – visual effects
- Bernie Pollack – costume designer
- Steve Golin – producer, executive
- Paul LeBlanc – hairstylist
- John Briley – writer
- Diahann Carroll – actress, singer
- Terry Jones – writer, director, actor
- Catherine Burns – actress
- Agnès Varda – director, writer
- Wayne Fitzgerald – title designer
- David Foster – producer
- Danny Aiello – actor
- Buck Henry – writer, actor, director
- Stanley Donen – director, choreographer
- David V. Picker – producer, executive
- Barry Malkin – film editor
- Robert Forster – actor
- Robert Evans – producer, executive, actor
- Richard Williams – animator
- Machiko Kyō – actress
- James R. Alexander – sound mixer
- Anna Karina – actress
- D. A. Pennebaker – documentarian
- Leonard Goldberg – producer, executive
- Fernando Luján – actor
- André Previn – composer, conductor
- Peter Mayhew – actor
- Sylvia Miles – actress
- William J. Creber – production designer
- Godfrey Gao – actor
- Bibi Andersson – actress
- Michael Lynne – executive, producer
- Gene Warren Jr. – special effects, visual effects
- Alvin Sargent – writer
- Doris Day – actress
- Anna Udvardy – producer
- Sid Ramin – composer, arranger
- Michelle Guish – casting director
- Sidney Sheinberg – executive, producer
- Ben Barenholtz – distributor, executive, producer
- Joss Williams – special effects
- Piero Tosi – costume designer
- Kenneth Walker – hairstylist
- Rutger Hauer – actor
- Syd Mead – designer, concept artist
- Harriet Frank Jr. – writer
- Franco Zeffirelli – director
- John Witherspoon – actor
- Bernard Chevry – producer
- Seymour Cassel – actor
- Peter Fonda – actor, director, writer
- Branko Lustig – producer
- Gerry Smith – marketing executive
- John Singleton – director, writer, producer
- Kirk Douglas – actor, producer

== See also ==
- Autograph suit of Sandy Powell
- List of submissions to the 92nd Academy Awards for Best International Feature Film
- List of most watched United States television broadcasts of 2020
