= Daniel Macarin =

New Zealand visual effects artist

- Occupation: Visual effects artist

Daniel Macarin is a New Zealand visual effects artist. He was nominated for an Academy Award in the category Best Visual Effects for the film Alien: Romulus.

== Selected filmography ==
- Alien: Romulus (2024; co-nominated with Eric Barba, Nelson Sepulveda-Fauser and Shane Mahan)
