= Nelson Sepulveda-Fauser =

Argentine visual effects artist

- Born: 1967 (age 57–58); Argentina
- Occupation: Visual effects artist

Nelson Sepulveda-Fauser (born 1967) is an Argentine visual effects artist. He was nominated for two Academy Awards in the category Best Visual Effects for the films The Irishman and Alien: Romulus.

== Selected filmography ==
- Kong: Skull Island (2017)
- Avengers: Infinity War (2018)
- The Irishman (2019; co-nominated with Pablo Helman, Leandro Estebecorena and Stephane Grabli)
- Space Jam: A New Legacy (2021)
- Ahsoka (2023)
- Alien: Romulus (2024; co-nominated with Eric Barba, Daniel Macarin and Shane Mahan)
