= List of most watched United States television broadcasts of 2020 =

The following is a list of most watched United States television broadcasts of 2020.

== Most watched by week ==
Most watched single-network primetime programs
Week of	Title	Network	Viewers (million)	Ref.
January 6	NFC Divisional playoff (Seahawks vs. Packers)	Fox	37.24	
January 13	NFC Championship (Packers vs. 49ers)	Fox	42.79	
January 20	62nd Annual Grammy Awards	CBS	18.69	
January 27	Super Bowl LIV	Fox	100.45	
February 3	92nd Academy Awards	ABC	23.57	
February 10	NCIS	CBS	11.76	
February 17	Ninth Democratic debate	NBC	12.11	
February 24	Tenth Democratic debate	CBS	15.34	
March 2	60 Minutes	CBS	9.39	
March 9	NCIS	CBS	10.76	
March 16	60 Minutes	CBS	10.90	
March 23	NCIS	CBS	13.20	
March 30	NCIS	CBS	13.66	
April 6	60 Minutes	CBS	9.68	
April 13	NCIS	CBS	13.50	
April 20	60 Minutes	CBS	10.90	
April 27	Young Sheldon	CBS	10.15	
May 4	60 Minutes	CBS	9.53	
May 11	60 Minutes	CBS	9.94	

Highest rated syndicated programs (weekly average)
Week of	Title	Distributor	Rating (household)	Ref.
January 6	Jeopardy!	CTD	7.1	
January 13	Judge Judy	CTD	6.8	
January 20	Family Feud	D-M	6.2	
January 20	Wheel of Fortune	CTD	6.2	
January 20	Jeopardy!	CTD	6.2	
January 27	Jeopardy!	CTD	6.3	
February 3	Judge Judy	CTD	6.5	
February 10	Judge Judy	CTD	6.9	
February 17	Judge Judy	CTD	6.5	
February 24	Judge Judy	CTD	6.6	
March 2	Judge Judy	CTD	6.4	
March 2	Jeopardy!	CTD	6.4	
March 9	Jeopardy!	CTD	6.5	
March 16	Jeopardy!	CTD	7.3	
March 23	Jeopardy!	CTD	7.3	
March 30	Jeopardy!	CTD	7.2	
April 6	Family Feud	D-M	7.4	
April 13	Family Feud	D-M	7.2	
April 13	Jeopardy!	CTD	7.2	
April 20	Family Feud	D-M	7.1	
April 27	Jeopardy!	CTD	7.0	
