= Stephane Grabli =

French visual effects artist

- Occupation: Visual effects artist

Stephane Grabli is a French visual effects artist. He was nominated for an Academy Award in the category Best Visual Effects for the film The Irishman.

== Selected filmography ==
- The Irishman (2019; co-nominated with Pablo Helman, Leandro Estebecorena and Nelson Sepulveda-Fauser)
