= Alien: Romulus =

2024 film by Fede Álvarez

- Theatrical release poster
- Directed by: Fede Álvarez
- Written by: Fede Álvarez; Rodo Sayagues
- Based on: Characters by: Dan O'Bannon; Ronald Shusett
- Produced by: Ridley Scott; Michael Pruss; Walter Hill
- Starring: Cailee Spaeny; David Jonsson; Archie Renaux; Isabela Merced; Spike Fearn; Aileen Wu
- Cinematography: Galo Olivares
- Edited by: Jake Roberts
- Music by: Benjamin Wallfisch
- Production companies: 20th Century Studios; Scott Free Productions; Brandywine Productions
- Distributed by: 20th Century Studios
- Release dates: August 12, 2024 (Los Angeles); August 15, 2024 (Edinburgh); August 16, 2024 (United States)
- Running time: 119 minutes
- Countries: United States; United Kingdom
- Language: English
- Budget: $80 million
- Box office: $350.9 million

Alien: Romulus is a 2024 science fiction horror film directed by Fede Álvarez, who co-wrote the script with Rodo Sayagues. It is the seventh installment in the Alien film series, set between the events of Alien (1979) and Aliens (1986). The film stars Cailee Spaeny, David Jonsson, Archie Renaux, Isabela Merced, Spike Fearn, and Aileen Wu as six downtrodden young space colonists who encounter hostile creatures while scavenging a derelict space station from which they plan to steal cryostasis chambers to navigate to another planet.

At CinemaCon in April 2019, 20th Century Studios (then-named 20th Century Fox) announced plans to produce future Alien films. Álvarez was attached as director in March 2022, and Spaeny joined as the lead later that year. Filming took place from March to July 2023.

Alien: Romulus premiered in Los Angeles on August 12, 2024, and was theatrically released in the United States by 20th Century Studios on August 16. The film was a commercial success, grossing $350.9 million worldwide on a $80 million budget, and it received generally positive reviews from critics. It received several industry nominations, namely for its technical aspects, including an Academy Award nomination for Best Visual Effects. A sequel is in development.

== Plot ==
In 2142, a Weyland-Yutani probe recovers a large cocoon from the wreckage of the USCSS Nostromo. (Note: As depicted in Alien (1979).) Months later, at the run-down Jackson's Star mining colony on the perpetually dark planet LV-410, orphaned colonist Rain Carradine discovers that Weyland-Yutani has forcibly extended her work contract. Determined to escape, she teams up with her adopted brother Andy (a malfunctioning android reprogrammed by her father), her ex-boyfriend Tyler, his pregnant sister Kay, their cousin Bjorn, and Bjorn's adopted sister Navarro. The group commandeers the hauler Corbelan IV to reach Renaissance, a seemingly abandoned Weyland-Yutani station split into the modules Romulus and Remus, intending to steal cryostasis equipment to survive the nine-year journey to Yvaga III, an apparently idyllic planet unaffiliated with Weyland-Yutani.

Bjorn taunts Andy with the fact that Yvaga III does not allow androids, meaning Andy will have to remain behind, leaving Rain guilt-ridden. Tyler and Bjorn attempt to retrieve cryostasis fuel but unintentionally trigger a lockdown and release dozens of facehugger parasites. In desperation, Rain upgrades Andy's security access with a control chip from the station's damaged science officer android, Rook. However, this reprogramming shifts Andy's loyalty from Rain to Weyland-Yutani. Andy leads the group to safety, but not before a facehugger impregnates Navarro.

Rain reactivates Rook, who reveals that the cocoon contained the xenomorph that killed most of the Nostromo's crew. Renaissance scientists experimented on the alien, reverse-bioengineering the facehuggers. However, the xenomorph escaped and massacred most of the crew; those remaining died when the xenomorph was killed, as its acidic blood melted through Remus's hull, causing explosive decompression.

Bjorn attempts to flee with Navarro and Kay on the Corbelan, but an infant xenomorph bursts from Navarro's chest, killing her and causing the ship to crash into Romulus's hangar, accelerating the station's collision course with LV-410's planetary rings. As the infant rapidly matures, Bjorn wounds it with a stun baton and is killed by its acid blood. Kay escapes into Romulus, pursued by the creature. Rain and Tyler attempt to rescue her, but Andy, suspecting the xenomorph is using her as bait, refuses to open the door between them. Helpless, they watch as it abducts Kay.

Rook instructs Andy to retrieve Z-01, a potent fluid harvested from the facehuggers that can rapidly rewrite and adapt DNA. Weyland-Yutani plans to use it to create genetically perfect humans capable of thriving in space. He orders that it be taken to Jackson's Star, or he will not release the Corbelan. Rain and Tyler arm themselves with rifles, but Andy warns them against injuring the xenomorph to avoid another explosive decompression.

The group discovers a xenomorph nest, where they rescue a badly injured Kay. Andy gives her a vial of Z-01 to heal, which she keeps. Hordes of facehuggers and xenomorphs attack them, and Tyler sacrifices himself to protect Rain and Kay while Andy is incapacitated. Rain drags Kay to safety and returns to rescue Andy, restoring his original programming. With xenomorphs and facehuggers surrounding them, Rain disables the station's gravity, allowing her to shoot them without their blood touching the hull. As the gravity reactivates, Rain is confronted by the Navarro xenomorph, but Andy intervenes and kills it. Rain and Andy escape aboard the Corbelan as Renaissance is destroyed by LV-410's rings.

Rain prepares Andy for the trip to Yvaga III, insisting they will remain together despite the planet's rules against androids. Kay—having injected herself with the Z-01—gives birth to a human–xenomorph hybrid mutated by the substance. The hybrid kills Kay and disables Andy before Rain ejects it into LV-410's rings, disintegrating it. After setting course for Yvaga III, Rain and Andy enter cryostasis.

== Cast ==
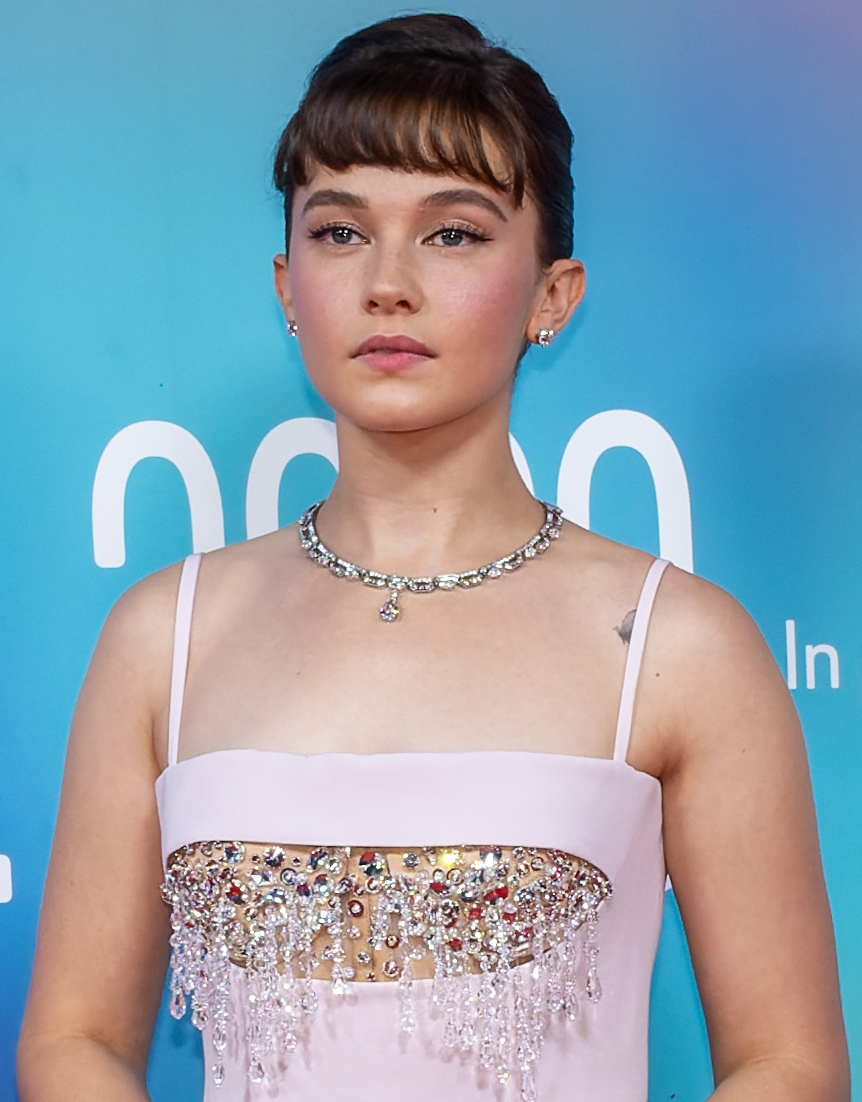
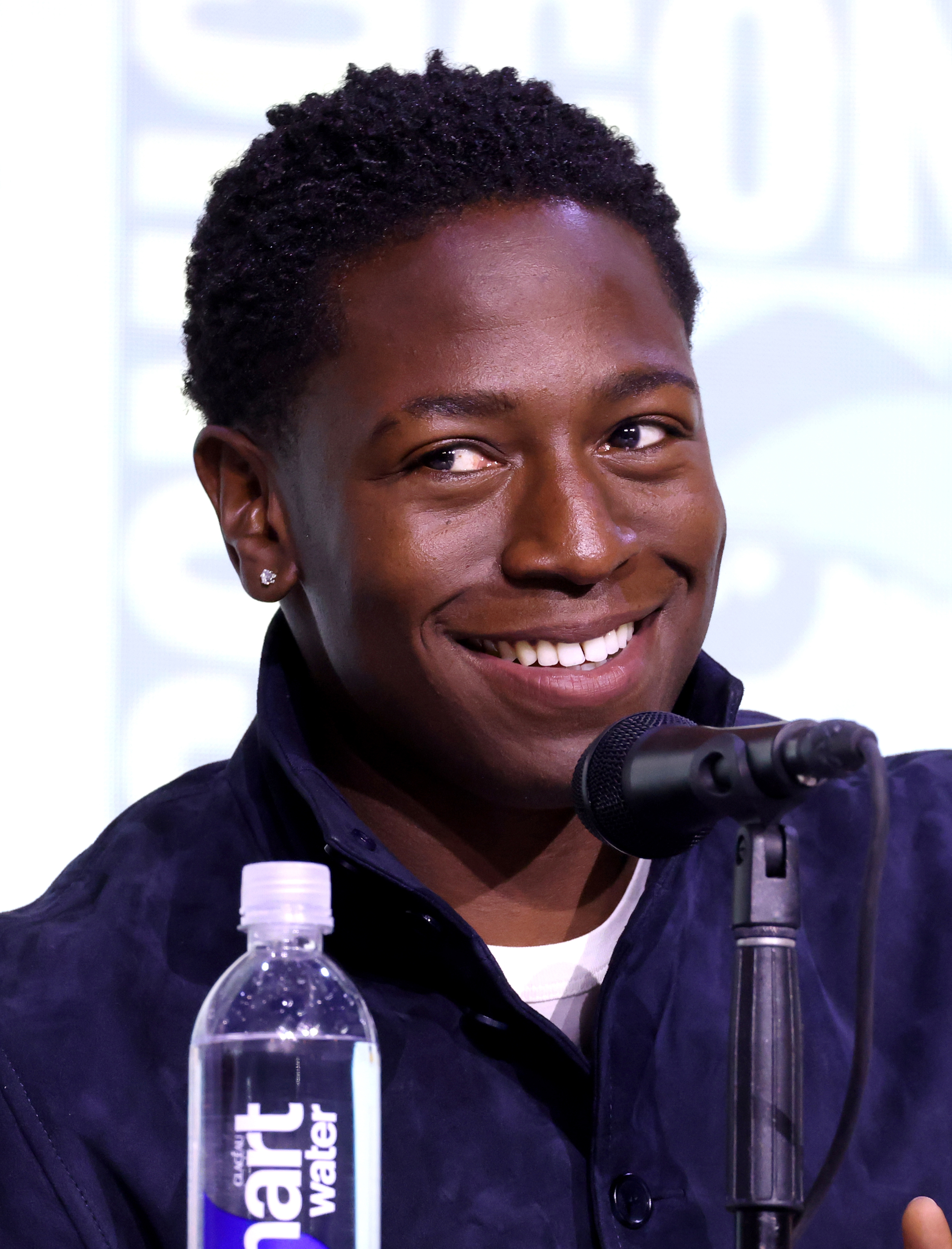
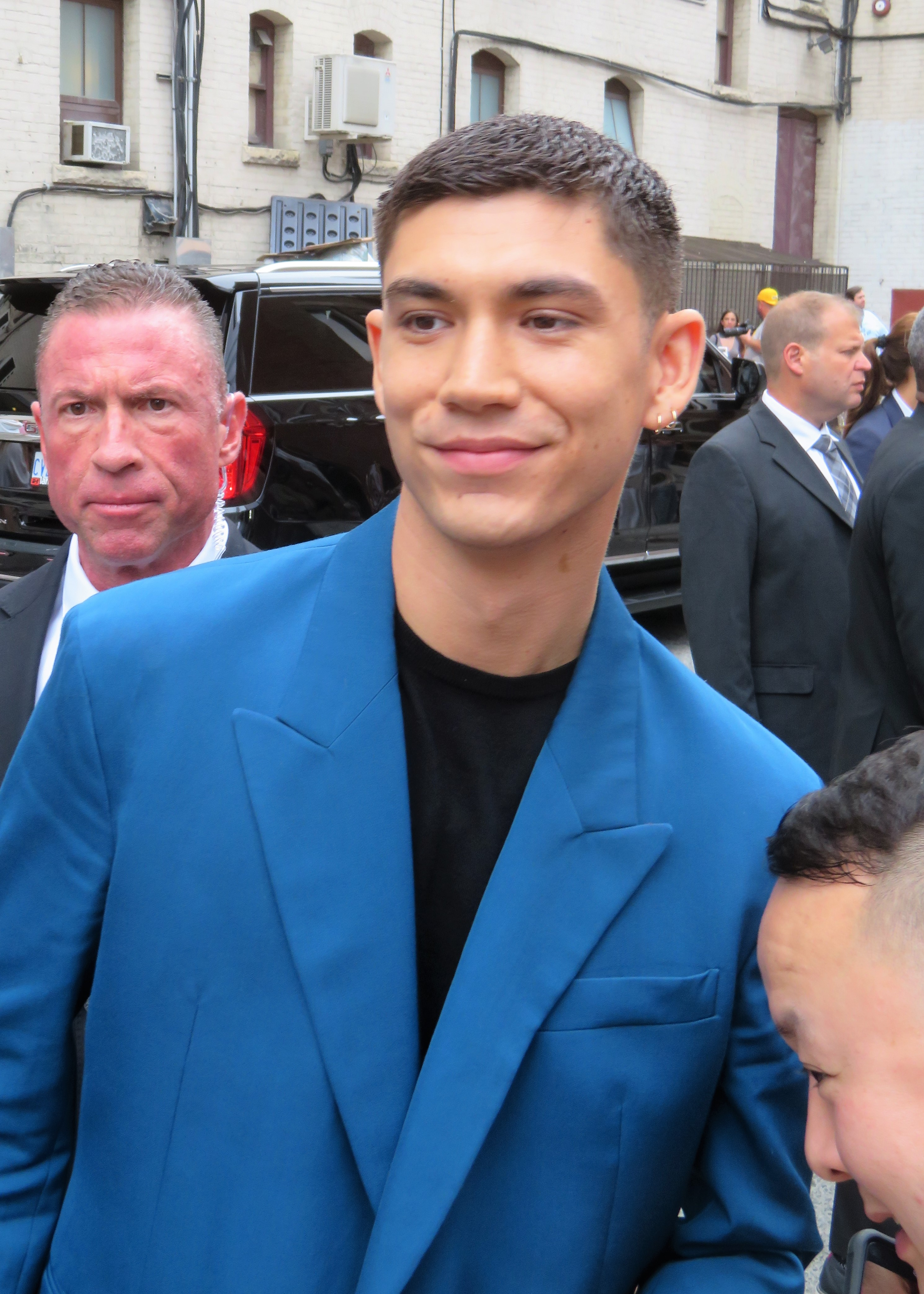
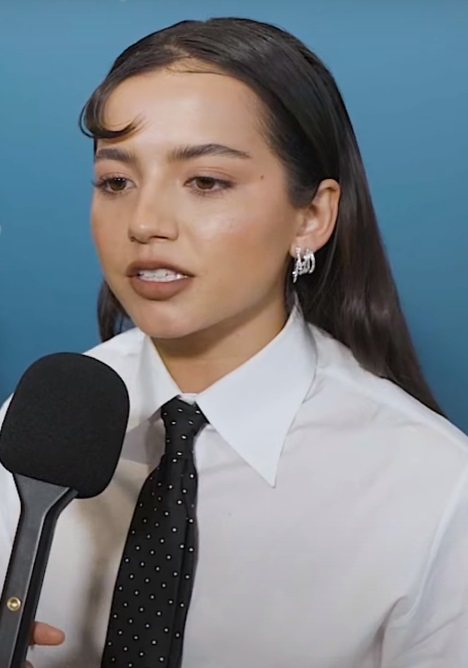
Cailee Spaeny (pictured in 2023), David Jonsson (2025), Archie Renaux (2022), and Isabela Merced (2024)
- Cailee Spaeny as Marie Raines "Rain" Carradine, an orphaned miner
- David Jonsson as Andy, an android reprogrammed by Rain's late father as her surrogate brother
- Archie Renaux as Tyler Harrison, Rain's ex-boyfriend
- Isabela Merced as Kay Harrison, Tyler's younger sister who is pregnant
- Spike Fearn as Bjorn, Tyler and Kay's cousin who lost his mother to an android
- Aileen Wu as Navarro, a pilot and Bjorn's adopted sister

Rook, an android science officer on board the Romulus, is voiced by Daniel Betts, while his physical appearance is based on the likeness of the late Ian Holm, who portrayed the android Ash in the original film. After securing permission from Holm's estate, Rook was realized by effects company Legacy Effects, who created an animatronic head and torso based on a headscan Holm had made during the production of The Lord of the Rings film trilogy. For certain shots, the practical character was also enhanced with machine-learning tools from the AI company Metaphysic, which visual effects supervisor Eric Barba said were used to retarget eyelines, add blinks and adjust the facial performance in post-production. Betts' dialogue recordings were then modified with the filtering software Speecher, to be based on Ash's dialogue pulled from the original Alien. Annemarie Griggs voices the Romulus's computer "Mother".

Trevor Newlin portrays the xenomorph, while the human–xenomorph hybrid (credited as the "Offspring") is portrayed by Romanian former basketball player Robert Bobroczkyi. To portray the Offspring, Bobroczkyi wore full body prosthetic makeup created by Legacy Effects, with the exception of the creature's tail which was CGI.

== Production ==
=== Development ===
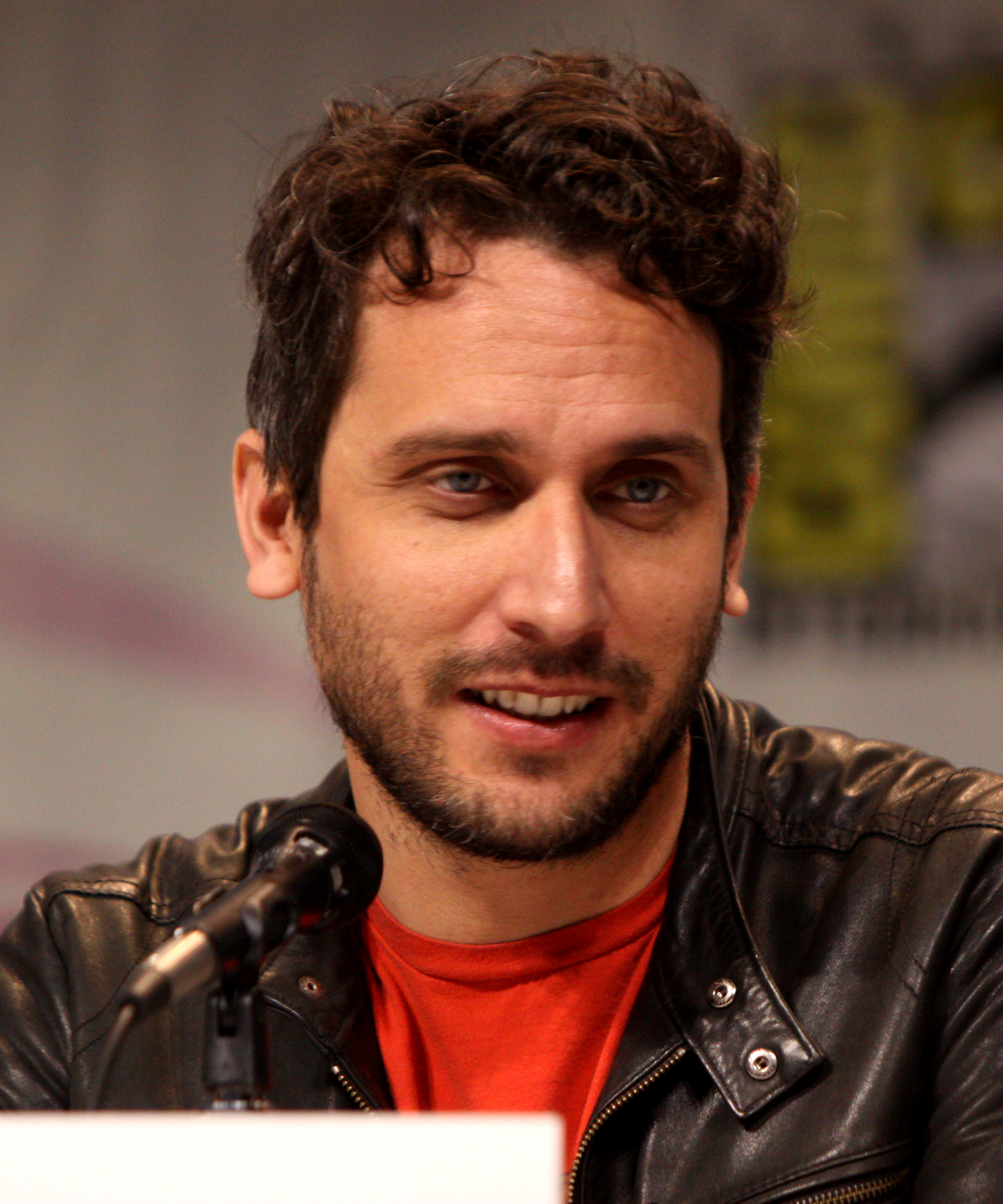
Fede Álvarez was chosen to direct the film after pitching his own story.

After the acquisition of 21st Century Fox by The Walt Disney Company, 20th Century Fox confirmed at the 2019 CinemaCon that future Alien films were in development. In March 2022, it was reported that Fede Álvarez would write and direct a seventh Alien film after pitching his own story, said to be "unconnected" to the previous films in the franchise, with the project set to be released on Hulu. Álvarez later clarified that the film was not a standalone story. The film was said to take place between the events of Alien (1979) and Aliens (1986), with some technical crew members returning from the latter film.

Álvarez stuck as close as possible to the established canon of the film series and used the fan wiki Xenopedia as a reference point while writing the story. The film features connections and references to all of the six prior Alien films—Alien, Aliens, Alien 3 (1992), Alien Resurrection (1997), Prometheus (2012), and Alien: Covenant (2017)—in some capacity, as well as the novel Alien: The Cold Forge (2018) by Alex White. In particular, the film ties directly to Alien and Prometheus, with Weyland-Yutani recovering the xenomorph that attacked Ellen Ripley in Alien from the USCSS Nostromo, an android named Rook who physically resembles Ash from the first film, and the "black goo" from Prometheus that gives birth to a human–xenomorph hybrid resembling an Engineer from Prometheus and the creature from the ending of Resurrection, and to The Cold Forge in Rook seeking to harvest the Plagiarus Praepotens (Z-01) from that novel to develop human immortality. Rook appears via an animatronic with the likeness of the late Ian Holm, who previously portrayed Ash. Álvarez confirmed the connections to Prometheus and stated that the hybrid's resemblance to the Engineers was intentional; this was done to bridge the gap between the prequels and the original films. The film also draws inspiration from the video game Alien: Isolation (2014). This involved integrating the emergency phone registration points from the game into the film's set design. These phones, which functioned as save points in the game, served as easter eggs that would foreshadow impending danger for the audience. The pregnancy of character Kay was inspired by Dina from The Last of Us Part II (2020), who would later be portrayed by the same actress, due to Álvarez playing the game while writing the film. The story centers on three pairs of siblings, whether blood relatives or found family.

=== Casting ===
By November 2022, Cailee Spaeny had entered negotiations to star. In March 2023, Isabela Merced was set to co-star opposite Spaeny. Later that month, David Jonsson, Archie Renaux, Spike Fearn, and Aileen Wu joined the cast. Renaux also auditioned for Jonsson's role and was secretly cast in December 2022; while Fearn was cast in February 2023 after two quick self tapes. Fearn initially tried to do an American accent but the director asked him to keep his own British accent.

=== Filming ===
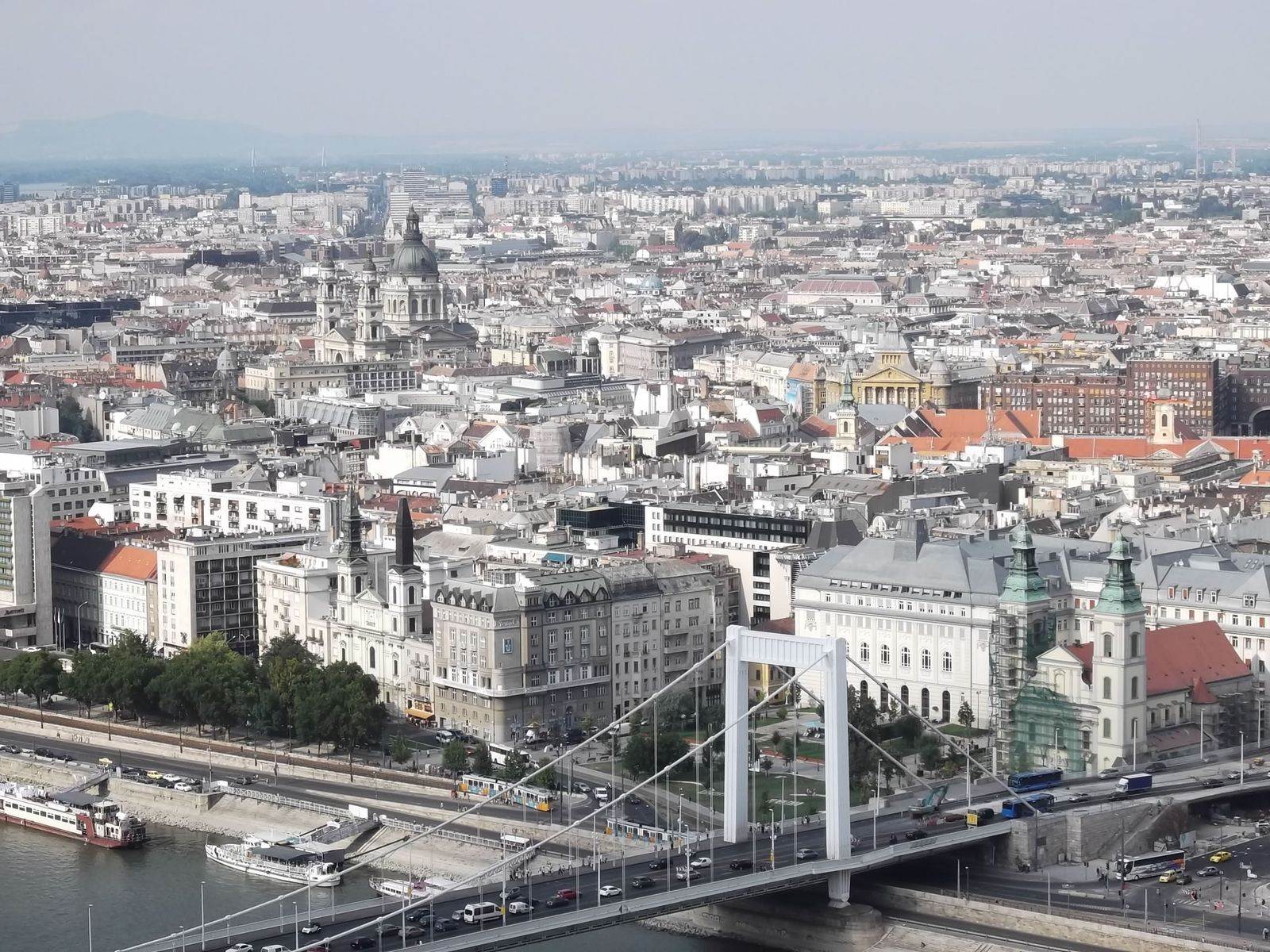
Filming was done in Budapest which was chosen for its "out-of-the-norm locations".

Principal photography took place in Budapest from March 9 to July 3, 2023, utilizing unique locations including a working power plant for the Jackson's Star mining colony. Production designer Naaman Marshall aimed to reinterpret the Alien world while honoring the franchise's legacy, particularly the first two films in the series. As such, the Romulus section of the Renaissance space station was designed to be reminiscent of the set design seen in the film Alien and the video game Alien: Isolation, influenced by the original Alien concept art by Ron Cobb, as well as industrial heavy-lift machinery and vehicles. Meanwhile, the more advanced Remus section was designed to be reminiscent of the production design depicted in the film Aliens. Sets were built as enclosed spaces, with the cockpit of the Corbelan IV hauler built on a gimbal to simulate flight.

The film was filmed chronologically and emphasized practical effects, using physical sets and creature designs to enhance realism. This approach focused on creating a tangible, immersive experience, contrasting with the heavier reliance on CGI in modern productions. To that end, effects companies Legacy Effects, Studio Gillis, and Wētā Workshop created the film's practical adult Xenomorphs, chestbursters and facehuggers, respectively, and the production would alternate between using animatronics, rod puppets or creature suits depending on the amount of movement required for the shot. The Xenomorph was made to more closely resemble H. R. Giger's original Alien design from the first film, rather than designs from the sequels. However the Xenomorphs' design was altered to feature serrated skin resembling that of a shark, to give the impression that someone could be cut just by touching it. Filmefex Studios created the prosthetic makeup for the actors as well as the film's dead bodies, while a sequence showing time lapse security footage of a rat being crushed and regenerated was stop motion animation created by Phil Tippett. One notable design element is the pulse rifle, which merges features from the original Alien flamethrower and the Aliens pulse rifle. This hybrid design reflects the film's intent to blend elements from both films, creating something familiar yet new.

Cinematographer Galo Olivares shot the film using Arri Alexa 35 digital cameras with Arri Master Prime and Ultra Prime spherical lenses for a 2.39:1 widescreen aspect ratio. This was chosen to be a visual balance between Alien, which was shot using anamorphic lenses in a 2.39:1 aspect ratio, and Aliens, which was filmed using spherical lenses for a 1.85:1 aspect ratio. Olivares would begin filming scenes with wide angle lenses, and gradually switch to increasingly longer lenses as scenes became more intense, with a 75mm lens being the longest lens used. Álvarez selected an orange hue as the film's defining color, diverging from the blue tones of earlier "Alien" films. This choice aimed to give the film a distinct visual identity while maintaining a connection to the franchise's established aesthetic.

Álvarez consulted Alien director Ridley Scott and Aliens director James Cameron during the film's production, who both expressed approval. However, Scott's comments two years after the film's release suggested otherwise.

=== Post-production ===
The film's computer generated imagery was created by effects studios Industrial Light and Magic, Fin Design, Image Engine, Tippett Studio, Wētā FX, Wylie Co., Atomic Arts, and Metaphysic. Effects supervisor Nelson Sepulveda-Fauser said that Alvarez's emphasis on tangible elements built out of practical effects meant that "everything else that we needed to build in computer graphics had to work around that, and integrate into photography seamlessly.” For the Xenomorphs themselves, the digital versions were used for actions unfeasible with Legacy Effects's puppets — "we can’t get a practical creature of that size to perform some of the movements required for an action sequence" — with the motions being unsettling while not over-exaggerated, such as the Xenomorphs slowly crawling on walls. While the creature movements tried to mostly be close to the original films, the Facehuggers were faster and more fluid to overcome the technical limitations of the animatronic versions and make the scene more exciting. Two particularly complex effects were Navarro using an x-ray wand to discover a Chestburster, that required a reproduction of the character's internal anatomy, and the acid blood floating in zero gravity.

Visual effects artist Ian Hunter created miniature effects for the film, in collaboration with the effects company Pro Machina and its founders Alec Gillis, Camille Balsamo-Gillis, and Reid Collums. This consisted of the spaceship Corbelan IV and the Weyland-Yutani Echo probe. These effects would be either filmed directly, or scanned into a computer for CGI modeling. Originally the miniatures were only designed to work as visual effect aids; however, the miniatures were eventually built, painted and finished by effects company Studio Gillis and shot in front of full screens and smoke. Filming of miniatures took place in Los Angeles to facilitate the required stage space, crew members and amenities.

== Music ==
The score was composed by Benjamin Wallfisch. The score features themes and cues from Alien, composed by Jerry Goldsmith; Aliens, composed by James Horner; and the tracks 'Life' and 'We Were Right' from Prometheus, composed by Harry Gregson-Williams. The composition "Entry of the Gods into Valhalla" from Richard Wagner's Das Rheingold, which was briefly featured in Alien: Covenant, is also heard. The soundtrack album was released by Hollywood Records on August 16. A vinyl edition of the soundtrack, featuring six bonus tracks, was released on November 15, 2024.

== Release ==
=== Marketing ===
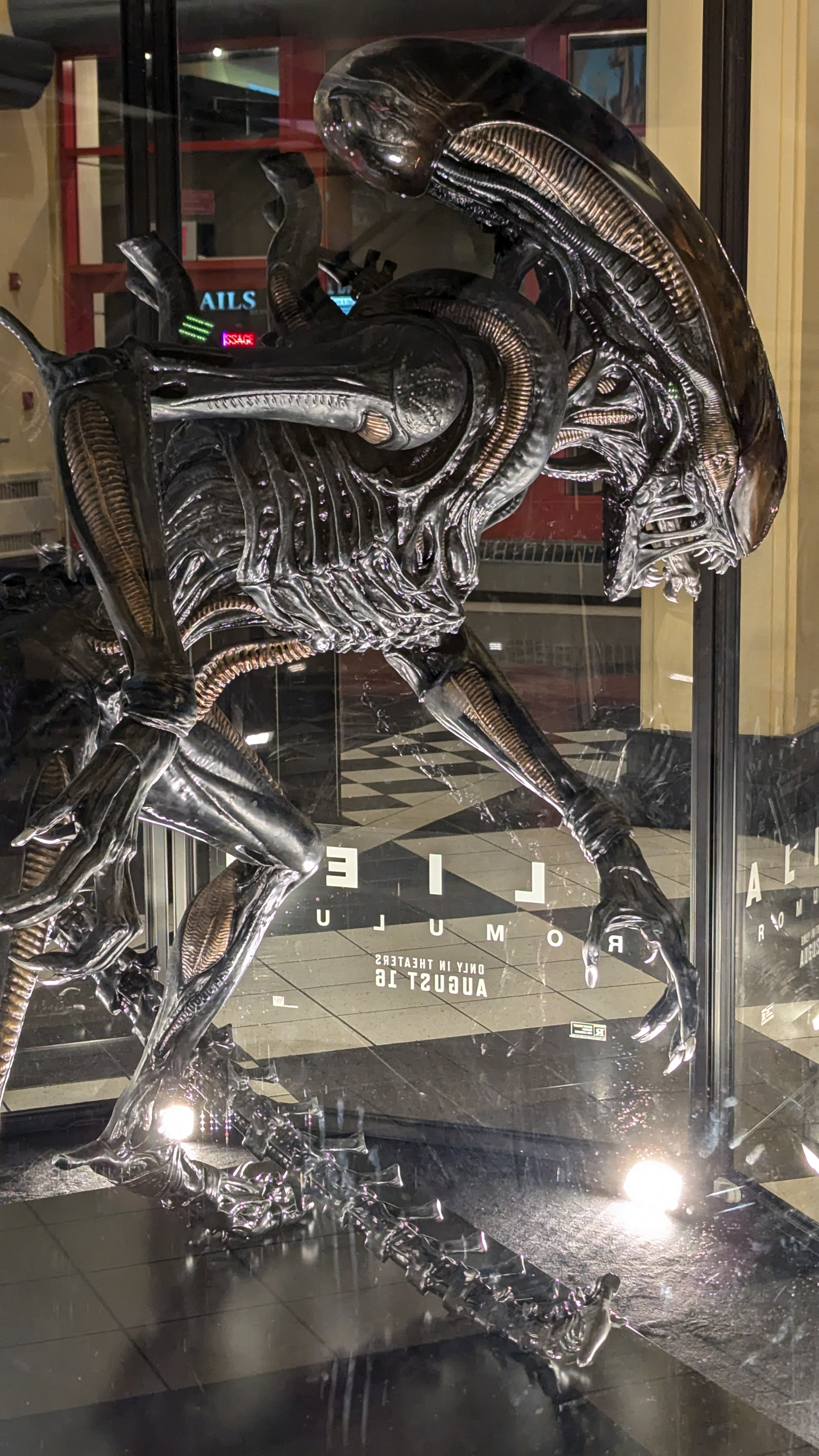
A promotional display for the film featuring a xenomorph

After early reviews found the third act to be divisive, Disney promptly created digital ads to generate buzz by urging audiences to watch the movie before hearing spoilers about the ending. The marketing was reliant on the legacy of the Alien brand, with the first trailer on March 20 amassing nearly 50 million views in 24 hours. Cinema partnerships offered customized food, beverage items, and life-size xenomorph statues, which were widely shared on social media. These products also included a popcorn bucket, part of a trend after Dune: Part Two (see popcorn bucket meme) and Deadpool & Wolverine earlier in the year. The campaign also extended across Disney's platforms, with takeovers on ESPN SportsCenter, Alien marathons on FX, and prominent placement on Hulu and Disney+. Promotional tie-ins included limited edition Reebok x Aliens shoes, Alien-themed beer from Angel City Brewery, and cosmetics from Phoenix Rising. Additionally, the franchise offered consumer products and hosted a partnership with the video game Dead by Daylight, which featured a new character tied to the film's release. Marketing efforts capitalized on the franchise's legacy, according to Deadline Hollywood, with 52% of audiences polled by Screen Engine and Comscore PostTrak citing their love for the series as the main reason for watching the movie on opening weekend.

=== Theatrical ===
Alien: Romulus was originally intended to be released directly on Hulu, but 20th Century Studios moved the film to a theatrical release shortly before filming commenced. The film held its world premiere in Los Angeles on August 12, 2024, and its UK premiere at the 77th Edinburgh International Film Festival on August 15, 2024. It was released by 20th Century Studios in the United States and United Kingdom the following day, on August 16, 2024.

=== Home media ===
Alien: Romulus was released through digital download on October 15, 2024, and was released on Ultra HD Blu-ray, Blu-ray, and DVD on December 3, by Sony Pictures Home Entertainment. The Blu-ray versions include deleted scenes and behind-the-scenes featurettes. The film also received a limited release on VHS on the same date, making it the first installment in the series to receive an official release on the format since Alien vs. Predator (2004), as well as the first major Hollywood film to do so since 2006.

In the United States, following its premium digital release on October 15, Alien: Romulus ranked No. 7 on iTunes and No. 5 on Fandango at Home's weekly digital sales and rental chart for the week ending October 28. On physical media, the film ranked No. 1 on Circana's VideoScan combined DVD and Blu-ray Disc sales chart, as well as the dedicated Blu-ray Disc sales chart, for the week ending December 7. High-definition formats accounted for 72% of first-week unit sales, including 27% from standard Blu-ray and 45% from 4K Ultra HD. The film also ranked No. 1 on the 4K Ultra HD disc sales chart. The film retained its No. 1 position on the VideoScan combined sales chart for the week ending December 14 and also remained No. 1 on the 4K disc chart. For December 2024, Alien: Romulus placed No. 1 on Circana's Top 10 physical media titles list. For the year, the film ranked twenty-third on Circana VideoScan’s Top Selling Titles on Disc (DVD and Blu-ray combined) of 2024. It achieved a sales index of 24.61, with Blu-ray formats accounting for 68 percent of total unit sales, including a 37% share from 4K Ultra HD. The film also placed twelfth on the Top Selling Blu-ray Discs of 2024 and fifth on the Top Selling 4K Ultra HD Blu-rays of 2024. In 2025, Alien: Romulus ranked forty-ninth on Circana VideoScan's Top Selling Titles on Disc. The film recorded a sales index of 14.37 relative to the year's top-selling title. Blu-ray formats accounted for 68% of total unit sales, including a 36% share from 4K Ultra HD.

Nielsen Media Research, which records streaming viewership on U.S. television screens, reported that Alien: Romulus was watched for 325 million minutes from November 18—24, 2024. The streaming aggregator Reelgood, which tracks real-time data from 20 million U.S. users for original and acquired content across SVOD and AVOD services, calculated that it ranked as the third most-streamed program between November 21—27. JustWatch, a guide to streaming content with access to data from more than 20 million users around the world, announced that Alien: Romulus was the tenth most-streamed horror film in Canada during the Halloween period between October 1, 2022, and October 13, 2025.

== Reception ==
=== Box office ===
Alien: Romulus grossed $105.3 million in the United States and Canada, and $245.5 million in other territories, for a worldwide total of $350.9 million. The film made $40 million from global IMAX, making it the highest-grossing horror film in the format.

In the United States and Canada, Alien: Romulus was projected to gross $28–40 million in its opening weekend, with some estimates going as high as $45–55 million. The film made $18 million on its first day, including $6.5 million from Thursday night previews. It went on to debut to $42 million, topping the box office. The three-day opening included an estimated 2.7 million admissions and was the second-highest for the franchise and a record for director Fede Álvarez (beating the $26.4 million earned by 2016's Don't Breathe) and actress Cailee Spaeny (surpassing the $28.1 million earned by 2018's Pacific Rim Uprising). When asked about the biggest factors in watching the film, audiences polled by PostTrak listed the in-theater trailer (21%), online trailer (13%), and word of mouth (13%). In its second weekend, the film made $16.4 million, a drop of 61%, finishing behind holdover Deadpool & Wolverine. In just two weekends, the film became the second highest-grossing horror film in IMAX with $31.2 million, only behind Prometheus ($31.8 million).

Outside the United States and Canada, the film made $68.1 million from international markets in its opening weekend for a global $110.1 million debut, which The New York Times listed as a success. Its international gross included $25.7 million from China, which Deadline Hollywood called an "over-performance". It was the second highest-grossing Hollywood film in China of the year with $110 million, behind Godzilla x Kong: The New Empire.

=== Critical response ===
Alien: Romulus received positive reviews from critics. The review aggregator website Rotten Tomatoes reported that critics praised the film's "striking visuals and claustrophobic terror with gory action and a formidable lead performance from Cailee Spaeny", calling it "arguably the best installment since Aliens". On the website, 80% of 392 critics gave the film a positive review, with an average rating of 6.9/10. Its critics consensus reads: "Honoring its nightmarish predecessors while chestbursting at the seams with new frights of its own, Romulus injects some fresh acid blood into one of cinema's great horror franchises." According to Metacritic, the film received "generally favorable" reviews based on a weighted average score of 64 out of 100 from 57 critics. Audiences polled by CinemaScore gave the film an average grade of "B+" on an A+ to F scale, while those surveyed by PostTrak gave it an 82% positive score, with 65% saying they would definitely recommend it.

Jordan Hoffman of Entertainment Weekly praised the film's direction, design, and writing, calling it "impressive, however, especially in how it looks like a new movie but is simpatico with the tech of the 1979 original" and deemed Spaeny "the finest weapon in the arsenal... differentiating herself quite a bit from the doe-eyed characters she played in Civil War and Priscilla. Her petite nature may not scream action hero, but, as has long been established, in space, no one can hear you scream anyway." Owen Gleiberman of Variety called Alien: Romulus "one of the best Alien sequels... It delivers the slimy creep-out goods in a way that none of the last three Alien films have." He further wrote that "Spaeny, with her clear eyes and serene resolve, makes her presence felt as Rain, the closest equivalent here to the fearless Ripley."

James Mottram, in a five star review for NME, described the film as "thrilling and scary" and coming "close to the brilliance of Ridley Scott and James Cameron". He praised the production design, digital work, practical and visual effects and the score. Mottram described the performance of Jonsson as Andy as a "stand-out" a view shared by Clarisse Loughrey writing for The Independent.

Mick LaSalle of the San Francisco Chronicle criticized the film, writing: "The first 45 minutes are boring beyond description. [...] The script has the aliens waking up and falling asleep at the convenience of the screenwriters, not in a way that makes consistent sense. [...] The foundational mistake came when someone said, 'Hey, let's make another Alien movie.' News flash: The alien concept is dead. Leave it alone, and leave poor Ian Holm out of it." David Ehrlich of Indiewire wrote: "The director would rather torture his cast than develop their characters. There's nothing inherently wrong with that trade-off, but Álvarez doesn't satisfy the first half of the equation well enough to justify his disregard for the second. High on jolts [...] and low on more probing scares, Romulus isn't nearly inventive enough to forefront its slaughter at the expense of its soul." Bilge Ebiri, writing for Vulture, expressed disappointment in the film's lessened ambition in comparison with other installments, stating that it is "a film engineered mostly to provide some basic genre thrills and keep the IP alive so that the now-Disney-owned Fox can generate more Alien movies.... Alien: Romulus is diverting enough, but it's also instantly forgettable—something I don't think I've ever said about any other Alien film, good or bad."

In August 2026, Ridley Scott opined that, looking back on Alien: Romulus, he thinks the film "was OK", but could have been better. He thus saw it as a sign that the franchise "needs some help", hence his intentions to return to the property, which he announced to do so by rewriting the next Alien film.

==== Response to Rook's likeness of Ian Holm ====
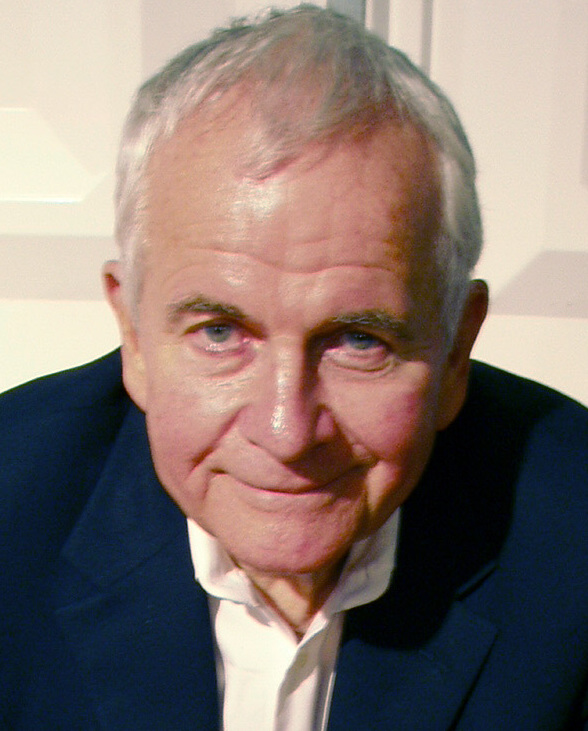
The decision to use the likeness of the deceased Ian Holm for the character of Rook was widely criticized.

The decision to digitally add the late Ian Holm for the character of Rook was widely criticized. Wendy Ide of The Guardian called it "a queasily misguided choice" that was "ghoulish, exploitative, disrespectful and unnecessary". In Slate, Sam Adams asked, "Why let the dead rest when there's IP [intellectual property] to be mined?" He went on to compare the film's studio to the franchise's villainous Weyland-Yutani corporation, in that it's "a massive conglomerate that puts profit ahead of respect for human lives". Loughrey called it "ethically problematic" and "cinematic necromancy" while Jesse Schedeen for IGN called it an "unforced error" that was "distractingly bad and completely unnecessary" and which almost ruined the movie. Similarly, SlashFilm reviewer Chris Evangelista wrote, "It's distracting and weird. It never, ever looks real [...] The simple truth here is that not only does this look bad, it's a bad idea all around". The Daily Telegraph critic Tim Robey commented, "One thing I never thought I'd complain about in 2024 was a film having too much Ian Holm in it".

In response to the backlash, Álvarez compared the use of CGI to recreate Ian Holm's likeness to other actors' wearing prosthetics to portray historical figures, such as Gary Oldman as Winston Churchill in Darkest Hour: "I don't think Churchill wanted that, and I think that's worse, because that is them pretending to be them... This is not me pretending it's Ian Holm... It's just the makeup that makes it look like him." Álvarez told the Los Angeles Times that he had obtained permission from Holm's family, and stated it had been done to honor Holm's role in the franchise. Reviewer James Mottram praised the digital inclusion, saying that it "works well, both technically and narratively."

The visual effects used to recreate Holm, which were incomplete for the theatrical release due to time constraints in post-production, were updated and fixed for the home video release. Álvarez said, "I convinced the studio we need to spend the money and make sure we give the companies that were involved in making it the proper time to finish it and do it right. It's so much better."

=== Accolades ===
Award	Date of ceremony	Category	Recipient(s)	Result	Ref.
Astra Midseason Movie Awards	July 3, 2024	Most Anticipated Movie	Alien: Romulus	Nominated	
Hollywood Professional Association Awards	November 7, 2024	Outstanding Visual Effects – Live Action Theatrical Feature	Ale Melendez, Steven Denyer, Sebastian Ravagnani, Nicolas Caillier, and Nelson Sepúlveda	Nominated	
Hollywood Professional Association Awards	November 7, 2024	Outstanding Sound – Theatrical Feature	David V. Butler, Mark Paterson, Polly McKinnon, Chris Terhune, Will Files, and Lee Gilmore	Nominated	
Astra Film and Creative Arts Awards	December 8, 2024	Best Horror or Thriller Feature	Alien: Romulus	Nominated	
San Diego Film Critics Society	December 9, 2024	Best Sound Design	Alien: Romulus	Nominated	
San Diego Film Critics Society	December 9, 2024	Best Visual Effects	Alien: Romulus	Nominated	
San Diego Film Critics Society	December 9, 2024	Best Stunt Choreography	Alien: Romulus	Nominated	
St. Louis Film Critics Association	December 15, 2024	Best Visual Effects	Eric Barba, Shane Mahan, and Nelson Sepulveda	Nominated	
Alliance of Women Film Journalists	January 2025	Best Stunt Performance	Cailee Spaeny	Nominated	
Golden Globe Awards	January 5, 2025	Cinematic and Box Office Achievement	Alien: Romulus	Nominated	
Saturn Awards	February 2, 2025	Best Horror Film	Alien: Romulus	Won	
Saturn Awards	February 2, 2025	Best Film Direction	Fede Álvarez	Nominated	
Saturn Awards	February 2, 2025	Best Supporting Actor in a Film	David Jonsson	Nominated	
Saturn Awards	February 2, 2025	Best Supporting Actress in a Film	Cailee Spaeny	Nominated	
Saturn Awards	February 2, 2025	Best Film Production Design	Naaman Marshall	Nominated	
Saturn Awards	February 2, 2025	Best Film Make Up	Pam Smyth	Nominated	
Saturn Awards	February 2, 2025	Best Film Visual / Special Effects	Eric Barba, Nelson Sepulveda-Fauser, Daniel Macarin, and Shane Mahan	Nominated	
Set Decorators Society of America	February 2, 2025	Best Achievement in Décor/Design of a Fantasy or Science Fiction Film	Zsuzsanna Sipos, Naaman Marshall	Nominated	
AACTA Awards	February 7, 2025	Best Visual Effects or Animation	Nelson Sepulveda-Fauser, Jhon Alvarado, Alé Melendez, Sebastian Ravagnani, and Nicolas Caillier	Nominated	
Visual Effects Society Awards	February 11, 2025	Outstanding Model in a Photoreal or Animated Project	Waldemar Bartkowiak, Trevor Wide, Matt Middleton, Ben Shearman (for "Renaissance Space Station" )	Won	
Golden Reel Awards	February 23, 2025	Outstanding Achievement in Sound Editing – Feature Dialogue / ADR	Will Files, Lee Gilmore, Matt "Smokey" Cloud, Polly McKinnon, David Butler, Ryan Cole, Jacob Riehle, Ailene Roberts	Nominated	
Golden Reel Awards	February 23, 2025	Outstanding Achievement in Sound Editing – Feature Effects / Foley	Will Files, Lee Gilmore, Chris Terhune, Luis Galdames, Dan Kenyon, Ken McGill, James Miller, Matt "Smokey" Cloud, Steve Neal, Samuel Munoz, Lyndsey Schenk, Jacob McNaughton, Noel Vought	Nominated	
Academy Awards	March 2, 2025	Best Visual Effects	Eric Barba, Nelson Sepulveda-Fauser, Daniel Macarin and Shane Mahan	Nominated	
Critics' Choice Super Awards	August 7, 2025	Best Science Fiction/Fantasy Movie	Alien: Romulus	Nominated	
Critics' Choice Super Awards	August 7, 2025	Best Actor in a Science Fiction/Fantasy Movie	David Jonsson	Nominated	
Critics' Choice Super Awards	August 7, 2025	Best Actress in a Science Fiction/Fantasy Movie	Cailee Spaeny	Nominated	

== Comic book ==
A tie-in prequel comic book, bridging the events of Alien and Romulus, written by Zac Thompson, drawn by Daniel Picciotto and colored by Yen Nitro, with a cover by Leinil Francis Yu, was published by Marvel Comics on October 23, 2024. The one-shot, simply titled Alien: Romulus #1, explores the events that unfolded on the space station Renaissance, providing context for the alien encounter faced by Rain, Andy, and their crew aboard the deteriorated spacecraft.

== Future ==
Álvarez told Brian Davids of The Hollywood Reporter that he had ideas in mind for a sequel to Romulus, but did not want to rush into anything, citing the seven-year gap between the first two films: "We really try to think about it more in terms of story and if it needs another chapter and whether people want to know what happens next. So we'll wait to see what people think and if people ask for it. My philosophy is that you should never make [a sequel] in two years. You've got to get away. You've got to get the audience to really want it. If you think about Alien and Aliens, there's seven years between them. But we definitely have ideas about where it should go."

Álvarez also said he was open to directing a third Alien vs. Predator film, proposing to Melanie Brooks and Anthony D'Alessandro of Deadline Hollywood that he would enjoy directing it along with Dan Trachtenberg, the director of the Predator films Prey (2022), Predator: Killer of Killers (2025) and Predator: Badlands (2025): "Maybe it's something I have to co-direct with my buddy Dan. Maybe we should do like [Quentin] Tarantino and Robert Rodriguez did with [From] Dusk till Dawn. I'll direct a half, and he'll direct another half."

In October 2024, 20th Century Studios president Steve Asbell said, "We're working on a sequel idea now. We haven't quite closed our deal with Fede [Álvarez], but we are going to, and he has an idea that we're working on." In November 2024, a sequel to Alien: Romulus was confirmed. By February 2025, Álvarez confirmed that he was then writing the script for a sequel, stating that it would be the next project on which he begins production, and principal photography tentatively scheduled for later that year. In June, Álvarez stated that pre-production for the sequel was underway, with filming slated to begin in October. In September 2025, Álvarez confirmed that a script was completed, and that although he would remain as a producer, he would not be returning to direct the sequel.

In August 2026, Scott revealed that he was rewriting the next Alien film as he felt that Romulus "was OK" but could have been better and therefore that the Alien franchise needed a boost, hence his decision to return to it due to perceiving that it needed his help. He confirmed to be working on continuing the trilogy which began with Prometheus and Alien: Covenant with a new film featuring the character of David played by Michael Fassbender in the two previous films.
