= Shane Mahan =

American makeup artist and puppeteer

- Born: Shane Patrick Mahan; 1964 (age 61–62); Greenville, Michigan
- Occupations: Creature design, prosthetic make up & special effects supervisor currently Movie Producer

Shane Patrick Mahan (born September 22, 1964) is an American special effects creator, creature designer, puppeteer and producer known for his work at Stan Winston Studio and its successor, Legacy Effects. His film credits include The Terminator and Terminator 2: Judgment Day; Aliens; Predator and Predator 2; The Lost World: Jurassic Park; Iron Man, Iron Man 2 and Iron Man 3; Pacific Rim and The Shape of Water.

== Background ==
Mahan was born and raised in Greenville, Michigan. After graduating from Greenville High School in 1981 he left for Hollywood. His first job was with Stan Winston Studios as a crew member working on The Terminator in 1983. There he worked as a creature effects supervisor. After Stan winston's passing he formed Legacy effects with three partners who were also his former colleagues at Stan Winston studios and this has now become the Leading VFX company in Hollywood

Mahan and his design team made the special suits worn by Robert Downey Jr. in the film Iron Man. They also designed the suit for Iron Man which was ten feet tall, weighed 800lbs and required 5 operators to puppeteer. Besides several other nominations, Mahan and his team were nominated for the 2008 Oscar for 'Best Achievement in Visual Effects' for Iron Man. The team was hired as concept artists by James Cameron for his film Avatar. This was special for Mahan as his first special effects credits were for the film The Terminator.

Mahan worked for Stan Winston Studios until the death of Stan Winston in 2008 when he and three other veterans of the company, Lindsay MacGowan, J. Alan Scott and John Rosengrant, incorporated Legacy Effects, a character design, make-up and animatronic studio, so named in honor of the late Winston's legacy and lifelong achievements. He lives in Los Angeles.

== Partial filmography ==
=== Movie special effects ===
Year	Movie
1984	The Terminator
1986	The Vindicator
1986	Aliens
1987	Predator
1987	The Monster Squad
1988	Alien Nation
1989	Leviathan
1991	Terminator 2: Judgment Day
1993	Jurassic Park
1994	Interview with the Vampire
1995	Congo
1997	The Lost World: Jurassic Park
1998	Creature (TV)
1999	Instinct
1999	Inspector Gadget
1999	Galaxy Quest
2000	What Lies Beneath
2001	Pearl Harbor
2001	Artificial Intelligence: AI
2001	Earth vs. the Spider (TV)
2001	Mermaid Chronicles Part 1: She Creature (TV)
2002	Teenage Caveman
2003	Big Fish
2005	Constantine
2005	War of the Worlds
2005	Zathura: A Space Adventure
2006	Eight Below
2006	Skinwalkers
2007	The Deaths of Ian Stone
2008	Nosebleed
2008	Iron Man
2008	Indiana Jones and the Kingdom of the Crystal Skull
2009	G.I. Joe: The Rise of Cobra
2010	Passion Play

=== Other special effects ===
Puppeteer

- A Gnome Named Gnorm (1990)
- Predator 2 (1990)
- Jurassic Park (1993)
- T2 3-D: Battle Across Time (1996)
- The Lost World: Jurassic Park (1997)
- Inspector Gadget (1999)
- What Lies Beneath (2000)
- Because of Winn-Dixie (2005)
- Zathura: A Space Adventure (2005)
- Eight Below (2006)

Make-up

- Chiller (1985) (TV)
- Batman Returns (1992)
- The Island of Dr. Moreau (1996)
- Wrong Turn (2003)
- Constantine (2005)
- Smile (2005)
- Zathura: A Space Adventure (2005)
- Fur (2006)

== Awards and nominations ==
Year	Nominee / work	Award	Result
1997	The Island of Dr. Moreau	Saturn Award for Best Make-Up	Nominated
2002	The Day the World Ended	Make-Up Artists and Hair Stylists Guild Award for Best Special Makeup Effects	Nominated
2002	How to Make a Monster	Make-Up Artists and Hair Stylists Guild Award for Best Special Makeup Effects	Nominated
2002	Mermaid Chronicles Part 1: She Creature	Make-Up Artists and Hair Stylists Guild Award for Best Special Makeup Effects	Won
2008	Iron Man	Satellite Award Best Visual Effect	Nominated
2008	Iron Man	Academy Award for Best Achievement in Visual Effects	Nominated
2009	Iron Man	BAFTA Award for Best Special Visual Effects	Nominated
2009	Iron Man	Saturn Award for Best Special Effects	Nominated
2024	Alien: Romulus	Academy Award for Best Achievement in Visual Effects	Nominated
