= Leandro Estebecorena =

American special effects director

Leandro Estebecorena is a Special Effects Technical Director for the company Industrial Light & Magic. Born in Buenos Aires, Argentina, Estebecorena has been working in the film industry of the USA since 1996. He has participated in the special effects of the films Transformers, Pirates of the Caribbean: Dead Man's Chest, Mission: Impossible III and Chicken Little. He is the principal Technical Director for the special effects of the 2008 film The Spiderwick Chronicles.
