= List of Academy Award winners and nominees of Asian descent =

This is a list of Academy Award winners and nominees who are of Asian descent. This list is current as of the 98th Academy Awards.

== Best Picture ==
Best Picture
Year	Name	Country	Film	Status	Milestone / Notes
1973	William Peter Blatty	(United States) / (Lebanon)	The Exorcist	Nominated	Lebanese descent. First American of Asian descent to be nominated for Best Picture.
1980	Ronald L. Schwary	(United States) / (Lebanon)	Ordinary People	Won	Lebanese descent. First American of Asian descent to win for Best Picture.
1984	Ronald L. Schwary	(United States) / (Lebanon)	A Soldier's Story	Nominated	(Shared with Norman Jewison and Patrick Palmer.)
1986	Ismail Merchant	(United Kingdom) / (India)	A Room with a View	Nominated	Indian descent.
1988	Hank Moonjean	(United States) / (Armenia)	Dangerous Liaisons	Nominated	Armenian descent. (Shared with Norma Heyman.)
1989	Tony Thomas	(United States) / (Lebanon)	Dead Poets Society	Nominated	Lebanese descent.
1989	A. Kitman Ho	(Hong Kong) / (United States)	Born on the Fourth of July	Nominated	Chinese descent. First Asian-American nominated for Best Picture (Shared with Oliver Stone.)
1991	A. Kitman Ho	(Hong Kong) / (United States)	JFK	Nominated	(Shared with Oliver Stone.)
1992	Ismail Merchant	(United Kingdom) / (India)	Howards End	Nominated	Indian descent.
1993	Ismail Merchant	(United Kingdom) / (India)	The Remains of the Day	Nominated	Indian descent. (Shared with Mike Nichols and John Calley.)
1996	Richard Sakai	(United States) / (Japan)	Jerry Maguire	Nominated	Japanese-American. (Shared with James L. Brooks, Laurence Mark, and Cameron Crowe)
2000	Ang Lee; William Kong; Hsu Li-kong	(Taiwan) (Hong Kong) (China)	Crouching Tiger, Hidden Dragon	Nominated	All three are of Chinese descent.
2011	Thomas Langmann	(France) / (Lebanon)	The Artist	Won	Lebanese descent.
2012	Ang Lee	(Taiwan)	Life of Pi	Nominated	Taiwanese. (Shared with Gil Netter and David Womark)
2019	Kwak Sin-ae; Bong Joon-ho	(South Korea)	Parasite	Won	Korean. First Best Picture win by Asian filmmakers.
2020	Christina Oh	(United States) / (South Korea)	Minari	Nominated	Korean-American.
2020	Chloé Zhao	(China)	Nomadland	Won	Chinese descent.
2021	Teruhisa Yamamoto	(Japan)	Drive My Car	Nominated	Japanese.
2021	Tanya Seghatchian	(United Kingdom) / (Armenia)	The Power of the Dog	Nominated	Armenian descent. (Shared with Jane Campion, Iain Canning, Roger Frappier, and Emile Sherman)
2022	Jonathan Wang	(United States) / (Taiwan)	Everything Everywhere All at Once	Won	Both are of Chinese descent. (Shared with Daniel Scheinert)
2022	Daniel Kwan	(United States) / (Taiwan) / (Hong Kong)	Everything Everywhere All at Once	Won	Both are of Chinese descent. (Shared with Daniel Scheinert)
2024	Samantha Quan	(Canada) / (Vietnam)	Anora	Won	Vietnamese descent. Shared with Alex Coco and Sean Baker.
2025	Zinzi Coogler	(United States) / (Philippines) / (China)	Sinners	Nominated	Filipino and Chinese descent.

== Best Director ==
Best Director
Year	Name	Country	Film	Status	Notes
1965	Hiroshi Teshigahara	(Japan)	Woman in the Dunes	Nominated	Japanese descent. First Asian nominated for Best Director.
1985	Akira Kurosawa	(Japan)	Ran	Nominated	Japanese descent.
1997	Atom Egoyan	(United Arab Republic) / (Armenia) / (Canada)	The Sweet Hereafter	Nominated	Of Armenian descent.
1998	Terrence Malick	(United States) / (Lebanon)	The Thin Red Line	Nominated	Lebanese and Assyrian descent.
1999	M. Night Shyamalan	(United States) / (India)	The Sixth Sense	Nominated	Indian descent. First Asian-American director to be nominated.
2000	Ang Lee	(Taiwan)	Crouching Tiger, Hidden Dragon	Nominated	
2005	Ang Lee	(Taiwan)	Brokeback Mountain	Won	First Asian to win Best Director.
2011	Terrence Malick	(United States) / (Lebanon)	The Tree of Life	Nominated	
2012	Ang Lee	(Taiwan)	Life of Pi	Won	First Asian to win Best Director multiple times.
2019	Bong Joon-ho	(South Korea)	Parasite	Won	First Korean director to be nominated and win Best Director.
2020	Lee Isaac Chung	(United States) / (South Korea)	Minari	Nominated	Korean descent.
2020	Chloé Zhao	(China)	Nomadland	Won	Chinese descent. First Asian woman to win Best Director.
2021	Ryusuke Hamaguchi	(Japan)	Drive My Car	Nominated	
2022	Daniel Kwan	(United States) / (Taiwan) / (Hong Kong)	Everything Everywhere All at Once	Won	Chinese descent. (Shared with Daniel Scheinert)
2025	Chloé Zhao	(China)	Hamnet	Nominated	First Asian woman to be nominated twice in the category.

== Best Actor ==
Best Actor
Year	Name	Country	Film	Role	Status	Milestone / Notes
1956	Yul Brynner	(Far Eastern Republic) (Switzerland) (United States)	The King and I	King Mongkut	Won	Buryat (Mongol) descent as well First Asian (and first Asian-American, overall) to be nominated for Best Actor, First Asian (and first Asian-American) to win Best Actor. Brynner became a naturalized U.S. citizen in 1943.
1982	Ben Kingsley	(United Kingdom) / (India)	Gandhi	Mahatma Gandhi	Won	Half-Indian descent (father is Indian).
1984	F. Murray Abraham	(United States) / (Syria)	Amadeus	Antonio Salieri	Won	Half-Syrian descent (father is Syrian).
2003	Ben Kingsley	(United Kingdom) / (India)	House of Sand and Fog	Massoud Behrani	Nominated	Tied for third most Oscar-nominated Asian of all time, with four nominations.
2011	Demián Bichir	(Mexico) / (Lebanon)	A Better Life	Carlos Galindo	Nominated	Lebanese descent.
2020	Riz Ahmed	(United Kingdom) / (Pakistan)	Sound of Metal	Ruben Stone	Nominated	Pakistani descent. First Muslim actor to be nominated for Best Actor.
2020	Steven Yeun	(United States) / (South Korea)	Minari	Jacob Yi	Nominated	Korean descent. First East Asian actor to be nominated for Best Actor.

== Best Actress ==
Best Actress
Year	Name	Country	Film	Role	Status	Milestone / Notes
1935	Merle Oberon	(British Raj) / (United Kingdom)	The Dark Angel	Kitty Vane	Nominated	Part-Sri Lankan and Māori (Polynesian) descent. First Asian nominated for any Academy Award. First actress of Asian (Burgher) descent to be nominated for Best Actress.
1987	Cher	(United States) / (Armenia)	Moonstruck	Loretta Castorini	Won	Born in the United States, is of Armenian descent.
2002	Salma Hayek	(Mexico) / (Lebanon)	Frida	Frida Kahlo	Nominated	Lebanese descent.
2010	Natalie Portman	(United States) / (Israel)	Black Swan	Nina	Won	Israeli descent.
2016	Natalie Portman	(United States) / (Israel)	Jackie	Jacqueline "Jackie" Kennedy	Nominated	Israeli descent.
2022	Michelle Yeoh	(Malaysia)	Everything Everywhere All at Once	Evelyn Quan Wang	Won	Malaysian-Chinese descent. First Southeast Asian actress nominated for and to win Best Actress. Second person of color to win Best Actress.

== Best Supporting Actor ==
Best Supporting Actor
Year	Name	Country	Film	Role	Status	Milestone / Notes
1936	Akim Tamiroff	(United States) / (Armenia)	The General Died at Dawn	General Yang	Nominated	Armenian descent. First Asian to be nominated in a supporting acting category. First Asian with multiple nominations in acting categories.
1943	Akim Tamiroff	(United States) / (Armenia)	For Whom the Bell Tolls	Pablo	Nominated	Armenian descent. First Asian to be nominated in a supporting acting category. First Asian with multiple nominations in acting categories.
1957	Sessue Hayakawa	(Japan)	The Bridge on the River Kwai	Colonel Saito	Nominated	Japanese descent.
1962	Omar Sharif	(Egypt) / (Syria)	Lawrence of Arabia	Sherif Ali ibn el Kharish	Nominated	Syrian descent.
1966	Mako Iwamatsu	(Japan)	The Sand Pebbles	Po-Han	Nominated	Japanese descent.
1984	Haing S. Ngor	(Cambodia)	The Killing Fields	Dith Pran	Won	Born in Cambodia, is of Chinese descent.
1984	Pat Morita	(United States) / (Japan)	The Karate Kid	Mr. Miyagi	Nominated	Japanese descent. First Asian American to be nominated for Best Supporting Actor.
1991	Ben Kingsley	(United Kingdom) / (India)	Bugsy	Meyer Lansky	Nominated	
2001	Ben Kingsley	(United Kingdom) / (India)	Sexy Beast	Don Logan	Nominated	
2003	Ken Watanabe	(Japan)	The Last Samurai	Lord Katsumoto Moritsugu	Nominated	Japanese descent.
2016	Dev Patel	(United Kingdom) / (India)	Lion	Saroo Brierley	Nominated	Indian descent.
2022	Ke Huy Quan	(United States) / (Vietnam)	Everything Everywhere All at Once	Waymond Wang	Won	Born in Vietnam, is of Chinese descent.

== Best Supporting Actress ==
Best Supporting Actress
Year	Name	Country	Film	Role	Status	Milestone / Notes
1957	Miyoshi Umeki	(Japan) / (United States)	Sayonara	Katsumi Kelly	Won	She was a shin Issei, or post-1945 immigrant from Japan. The first Asian woman to win an Academy Award for acting.
1983	Cher	(United States) / (Armenia)	Silkwood	Dolly Pelliker	Nominated	Armenian descent.
1985	Meg Tilly	(Canada) / (China)	Agnes of God	Sister Agnes	Nominated	Half-Chinese descent. First Asian American and first Chinese American to be nominated for Best Supporting Actress.
1994	Jennifer Tilly	(Canada) / (China)	Bullets Over Broadway	Olive Neal	Nominated	Half-Chinese descent.
1999	Catherine Keener	(United States) / (Lebanon)	Being John Malkovich	Maxine Lund	Nominated	Lebanese descent.
2003	Shohreh Aghdashloo	(United States) / (Iran)	House of Sand and Fog	Nadereh "Nadi" Behrani	Nominated	Iranian descent.
2004	Natalie Portman	(United States) / (Israel)	Closer	Alice Ayres / Jane Jones	Nominated	Israeli descent.
2005	Catherine Keener	(United States) / (Lebanon)	Capote	Nelle Harper Lee	Nominated	
2006	Rinko Kikuchi	(Japan)	Babel	Chieko Wataya	Nominated	First Japanese actress to be nominated for an Academy Award in 50 years.
2010	Hailee Steinfeld	(United States) / (Philippines)	True Grit	Mattie Ross	Nominated	Filipino descent (maternal grandfather was of half Filipino and half African-American descent). Youngest Asian American to be nominated for acting (age 14).
2020	Youn Yuh-jung	(South Korea)	Minari	Soon-ja	Won	First South Korean actor to be nominated and win an Academy Award.
2022	Hong Chau	(United States) / (Vietnam)	The Whale	Liz	Nominated	Vietnamese descent. First time two Asian American actresses nominated in the same year.
2022	Stephanie Hsu	(United States) / (Taiwan)	Everything Everywhere All at Once	Joy Wang/Jobu Tupaki	Nominated	Chinese descent. First time two Asian American actresses nominated in the same year.

== Best Original Screenplay ==
Best Original Screenplay
Year	Name	Country	Film	Status	Notes
1986	Ken Shadie	(Australia) / (Lebanon)	Crocodile Dundee	Nominated	Lebanese descent.
1986	Hanif Kureishi	(United Kingdom) / (Pakistan)	My Beautiful Laundrette	Nominated	Half-Pakistani descent (father is Pakistani).
1991	Callie Khouri	(United States) / (Lebanon)	Thelma & Louise	Won	Lebanese descent First American of Asian descent to win for Best Original Screenplay.
1999	M. Night Shyamalan	(United States) / (India)	The Sixth Sense	Nominated	Indian descent.
2002	Steven Zaillian	(United States) / (Armenia)	Gangs of New York	Nominated	Armenian descent.
2006	Iris Yamashita	(United States) / (Japan)	Letters from Iwo Jima	Nominated	Japanese descent. Second time a screenplay written almost entirely in an Asian language (Japanese) was nominated for a screenplay award. (Shared with Paul Haggis.)
2011	Asghar Farhadi	(Iran)	A Separation	Nominated	Iranian descent. First screenplay written in Persian to be nominated for a screenplay award.
2015	Alex Garland	(United Kingdom) / (Lebanon)	Ex Machina	Nominated	Lebanese descent.
2015	Ronnie del Carmen	(Philippines)	Inside Out	Nominated	Filipino descent. (Shared with Pete Docter, Meg LeFauve, and Josh Cooley.)
2017	Kumail Nanjiani	(Pakistan) / (United States)	The Big Sick	Nominated	Pakistani descent. (Shared with Emily V. Gordon.)
2019	Bong Joon-ho; Han Jin-won	(South Korea)	Parasite	Won	First Asian writers to win any screenwriting Academy Award.
2020	Lee Isaac Chung	(United States) / (South Korea)	Minari	Nominated	Korean descent.
2022	Daniel Kwan	(United States) / (Hong Kong)	Everything Everywhere All at Once	Won	Chinese descent. (Shared with Daniel Scheinert)
2023	Celine Song	(Canada) / (South Korea)	Past Lives	Nominated	Korean descent.
2025	Jafar Panahi; Shadmehr Rastin; Nader Saïvar; Mehdi Mahmoudian	(Iran)	It Was Just an Accident	Nominated	Iranian descent.

== Best Adapted Screenplay ==
Best Adapted Screenplay
Year	Name	Country	Film	Adapted From	Status	Notes
1973	William Peter Blatty	(United States) / (Lebanon)	The Exorcist	The Exorcist by William Peter Blatty	Won	Lebanese descent. First American of Asian descent to win for Best Adapted Screenplay.
1990	Steven Zaillian	(United States) / (Armenia)	Awakenings	Awakenings by Oliver Sacks	Nominated	
1993	Steven Zaillian	(United States) / (Armenia)	Schindler's List	Schindler's Ark by Thomas Keneally	Won	
1997	Hossein Amini	(Iran) / (United Kingdom)	The Wings of the Dove	The Wings of the Dove by Henry James	Nominated	
1997	Atom Egoyan	(United Arab Republic) / (Armenia) / (Canada)	The Sweet Hereafter	The Sweet Hereafter by Russell Banks	Nominated	Of Armenian descent.
1998	Terrence Malick	(United States) / (Lebanon)	The Thin Red Line	The Thin Red Line by James Jones	Nominated	Lebanese and Assyrian descent.
2000	Wang Hui-ling; Kuo Jung Tsai	(Taiwan) (China)	Crouching Tiger, Hidden Dragon	Crane-Iron Pentalogy by Wang Dulu	Nominated	Both are of Chinese descent. First Asian-language screenplay to be nominated in a writing category. (Shared with James Schamus.)
2011	Steven Zaillian	(United States) / (Armenia)	Moneyball	Moneyball: The Art of Winning an Unfair Game by Michael Lewis	Nominated	(Shared with Aaron Sorkin.)
2019	Steven Zaillian	(United States) / (Armenia)	The Irishman	I Heard You Paint Houses: Frank "The Irishman" Sheeran and Closing the Case on Jimmy Hoffa by Charles Brandt	Nominated	
2020	Chloé Zhao	(China)	Nomadland	Nomadland: Surviving America in the Twenty-First Century by Jessica Bruder	Nominated	
2020	Ramin Bahrani	(United States) / (Iran)	The White Tiger	The White Tiger by Aravind Adiga	Nominated	Iranian descent.
2020	Nina Pedrad	(United States) / (Iran)	Borat Subsequent Moviefilm	Borat Sagdiyev, created by Sacha Baron Cohen	Nominated	Iranian descent. (Shared with Sacha Baron Cohen, Peter Baynham, Jena Friedman, Anthony Hines, Lee Kern, Dan Mazer, Erica Rivinoja and Dan Swimer.)
2021	Ryusuke Hamaguchi and Takamasa Oe	(Japan)	Drive My Car	Short story of the same name by Haruki Murakami	Nominated	
2022	Kazuo Ishiguro	(Japan) / (United Kingdom)	Living	Ikiru by Akira Kurosawa, Shinobu Hashimoto and Hideo Oguni	Nominated	
2025	Chloé Zhao	(China)	Hamnet	Novel of the same name by Maggie O'Farrell	Nominated	(Shared with Maggie O'Farrell.)

== Best Cinematography ==
Best Cinematography
Year	Name	Country	Film	Status	Notes
1938	James Wong Howe	(United States) (Qing dynasty) / (Taiwan)	Algiers	Nominated	Chinese descent. First Asian to be nominated for Best Cinematography.
1940	James Wong Howe	(United States) (Qing dynasty) / (Taiwan)	Abe Lincoln in Illinois	Nominated	
1942	James Wong Howe	(United States) (Qing dynasty) / (Taiwan)	Kings Row	Nominated	
1943	James Wong Howe	(United States) (Qing dynasty) / (Taiwan)	Air Force	Nominated	(nominated with Elmer Dyer and Charles A. Marshall)
1943	James Wong Howe	(United States) (Qing dynasty) / (Taiwan)	The North Star	Nominated	
1955	James Wong Howe	(United States) (Qing dynasty) / (Taiwan)	The Rose Tattoo	Won	First Asian to win Best Cinematography.
1958	James Wong Howe	(United States) (Qing dynasty) / (Taiwan)	The Old Man and the Sea	Nominated	
1963	James Wong Howe	(United States) (Qing dynasty) / (Taiwan)	Hud	Won	First Asian to win multiple Academy Awards.
1966	James Wong Howe	(United States) (Qing dynasty) / (Taiwan)	Seconds	Nominated	
1970	Osamu Furuya; Shinsaku Himeda; Masamichi Satoh	(Japan)	Tora! Tora! Tora!	Nominated	All three are of Japanese descent. (Shared with Charles F. Wheeler.)
1975	James Wong Howe	(United States) (Qing dynasty) / (Taiwan)	Funny Lady	Nominated	Most Oscar-nominated Asian of all time, with ten nominations.
1985	Takao Saito; Masaharu Ueda; Asakazu Nakai	(Japan)	Ran	Nominated	All three are of Japanese descent.
1993	Gu Changwei	(China)	Farewell My Concubine	Nominated	Chinese descent.
1995	Lü Yue	(China)	Shanghai Triad	Nominated	Chinese descent.
1996	Darius Khondji	(Iran) / (France)	Evita	Nominated	Iranian descent.
2000	Peter Pau	(Hong Kong)	Crouching Tiger, Hidden Dragon	Won	Chinese descent.
2004	Zhao Xiaoding	(China)	House of Flying Daggers	Nominated	Chinese descent.
2010	Matthew Libatique	(United States) / (Philippines)	Black Swan	Nominated	Filipino descent. First Asian American to be nominated for Best Cinematography since Howe.
2018	Matthew Libatique	(United States) / (Philippines)	A Star Is Born	Nominated	
2022	Darius Khondji	(Iran) / (France)	Bardo, False Chronicle of a Handful of Truths	Nominated	Iranian descent.
2023	Matthew Libatique	(United States) / (Philippines)	Maestro	Nominated	Filipino descent.
2025	Autumn Durald Arkapaw	(United States) / (Philippines)	Sinners	Won	Filipino descent. First Asian American woman to be nominated for Best Cinematography.
2025	Darius Khondji	(Iran) / (France)	Marty Supreme	Nominated	

== Best Costume Design ==
Best Costume Design
Year	Name	Country	Film	Status	Notes
1952	Irene Sharaff	(United States) / (Armenia)	An American in Paris	Won	Armenian descent. First designer of Asian descent to win for Best Costume Design. Award shared with Orry-Kelly & Walter Plunkett
1954	Irene Sharaff	(United States) / (Armenia)	Call Me Madam	Nominated	Armenian descent.
1955	Sanzo Wada	(Japan)	Gate of Hell	Won	Japanese descent. First designer of East Asian descent to win for Best Costume Design
1955	Irene Sharaff	(United States) / (Armenia)	Brigadoon	Nominated	Armenian descent.
1955	Irene Sharaff	(United States) / (Armenia)	A Star Is Born	Nominated	Armenian descent.
1956	Tadaoto Kainosho	(Japan)	Ugetsu	Nominated	Japanese descent.
1956	Irene Sharaff	(United States) / (Armenia)	Guys and Dolls	Nominated	Armenian descent.
1957	Irene Sharaff	(United States) / (Armenia)	The King and I	Won	Armenian descent.
1957	Kohei Ezaki	(Japan)	Seven Samurai	Nominated	Japanese descent.
1960	Irene Sharaff	(United States) / (Armenia)	Porgy and Bess	Nominated	Armenian descent.
1961	Irene Sharaff	(United States) / (Armenia)	Can-Can	Nominated	Armenian descent.
1962	Irene Sharaff	(United States) / (Armenia)	West Side Story	Won	Armenian descent.
1962	Yoshirō Muraki	(Japan)	Yojimbo	Nominated	Japanese descent.
1964	Irene Sharaff	(United States) / (Armenia)	Cleopatra	Won	Armenian descent. With Renié & Vittorio Nino Novarese
1967	Irene Sharaff	(United States) / (Armenia)	Who's Afraid of Virginia Woolf?	Nominated	Armenian descent.
1968	Irene Sharaff	(United States) / (Armenia)	The Taming of the Shrew	Nominated	Armenian descent.
1970	Irene Sharaff	(United States) / (Armenia)	Hello, Dolly!	Nominated	Armenian descent.
1978	Irene Sharaff	(United States) / (Armenia)	The Other Side of Midnight	Nominated	Armenian descent.
1982	Bhanu Athaiya	(India)	Gandhi	Won	First Indian to win an academy award in costume design
1986	Emi Wada	(Japan)	Ran	Won	Japanese descent.
1993	Eiko Ishioka	(Japan)	Bram Stoker's Dracula	Won	Japanese descent.
2001	Tim Yip	(Hong Kong)	Crouching Tiger, Hidden Dragon	Nominated	Chinese descent from Hong Kong.
2007	Yee Chung-man	(Hong Kong)	Curse of the Golden Flower	Nominated	Chinese descent from Hong Kong.
2013	Eiko Ishioka	(Japan)	Mirror Mirror	Nominated	Japanese descent. Posthumous nomination.
2014	William Chang	(Hong Kong)	The Grandmaster	Nominated	Chinese descent from Hong Kong.
2022	Shirley Kurata	(United States) / (Japan)	Everything Everywhere All at Once	Nominated	Japanese descent.
2025	Miyako Bellizzi	(United States) / (Japan)	Marty Supreme	Nominated	Half-Japanese descent.

== Best Film Editing ==
Best Film Editing
Year	Name	Country	Film	Status	Notes
1975	Richard Chew	(United States) / (China)	One Flew Over the Cuckoo's Nest	Nominated	Chinese descent. First Asian nominated for Best Film Editing. First Asian American nominated for Best Film Editing. (Shared with Lynzee Klingman and Sheldon Kahn.)
1977	Richard Chew	(United States) / (China)	Star Wars	Won	First Asian to win Best Film Editing. First Asian American to win Best Film Editing. (Shared with Paul Hirsch and Marcia Lucas.)
1992	Kant Pan	(Hong Kong) (Malaysia) (Singapore)	The Crying Game	Nominated	Chinese descent.
1999	Tariq Anwar	(India) / (United Kingdom) / (United States)	American Beauty	Nominated	Half-Indian descent (father is Indian).
2010	Tariq Anwar	(India) / (United Kingdom) / (United States)	The King's Speech	Nominated	Half-Indian descent (father is Indian).
2014	Tom Cross	(United States) / (Vietnam)	Whiplash	Won	Half-Vietnamese descent (mother is Vietnamese).
2016	Tom Cross	(United States) / (Vietnam)	La La Land	Nominated	Half-Vietnamese descent (mother is Vietnamese).
2019	Yang Jin-mo	(South Korea)	Parasite	Nominated	
2020	Chloé Zhao	(China)	Nomadland	Nominated	First Asian (and Asian woman, overall) to be nominated for Best Film Editing while serving as director, producer, writer, and editor.

== Best International Feature Film ==
The Academy Award for Best International Feature Film is awarded to countries, not individuals. This list contains directors of nominated films of Asian descent, who typically accept the award on behalf of their country.

Best International Feature Film
Year	Director(s)	Country	Film	Status	Notes
1951	Akira Kurosawa	(Japan)	Rashomon	Won	Honorary Oscar
1954	Teinosuke Kinugasa	(Japan)	Gate of Hell	Won	Honorary Oscar
1955	Hiroshi Inagaki	(Japan)	Samurai, The Legend of Musashi	Won	Honorary Oscar
1956	Kon Ichikawa	(Japan)	Harp of Burma	Nominated	
1957	Mehboob Khan	(India)	Mother India	Nominated	
1961	Keisuke Kinoshita	(Japan)	Immortal Love	Nominated	
1963	Noburu Nakamura	(Japan)	Twin Sisters of Kyoto	Nominated	
1964	Ephraim Kishon	(Israel)	Sallah Shabati	Nominated	
1964	Hiroshi Teshigahara	(Japan)	Woman in the Dunes	Nominated	
1965	Masaki Kobayashi	(Japan)	Kwaidan	Nominated	
1967	Noboru Nakamura	(Japan)	Portrait of Chieko	Nominated	
1971	Akira Kurosawa	(Japan)	Dodes'ka-den	Nominated	
1971	Ephraim Kishon	(Israel)	The Policeman	Nominated	
1972	Moshé Mizrahi	(Israel)	I Love You Rosa	Nominated	
1973	Moshé Mizrahi	(Israel)	The House on Chelouche Street	Nominated	
1975	Kei Kumai	(Japan)	Sandakan No. 8	Nominated	
1977	Menahem Golan	(Israel)	Operation Thunderbolt	Nominated	
1980	Akira Kurosawa	(Japan)	Kagemusha (The Shadow Warrior)	Nominated	
1981	Kôhei Oguri	(Japan)	Muddy River	Nominated	
1984	Uri Barbash	(Israel)	Beyond the Walls	Nominated	
1988	Mira Nair	(India)	Salaam Bombay!	Nominated	
1990	Zhang Yimou; Yang Fengliang	(China)	Ju Dou	Nominated	
1991	Zhang Yimou	(China)	Raise the Red Lantern	Nominated	
1993	Chen Kaige	(China)	Farewell My Concubine	Nominated	
1993	Trần Anh Hùng	(Vietnam)	The Scent of Green Papaya	Nominated	
1993	Ang Lee	(Taiwan)	The Wedding Banquet	Nominated	
1994	Ang Lee	(Taiwan)	Eat Drink Man Woman	Nominated	
1996	Nana Jorjadze	(Georgia (country))	A Chef in Love	Nominated	
1998	Majid Majidi	(Iran)	Children of Heaven	Nominated	
2000	Ang Lee	(Taiwan)	Crouching Tiger, Hidden Dragon	Won	First Asian film to be nominated for Best International Feature and Best Picture.
2001	Ashutosh Gowariker	(India)	Lagaan	Nominated	
2002	Zhang Yimou	(China)	Hero	Nominated	
2003	Yoji Yamada	(Japan)	The Twilight Samurai	Nominated	
2005	Hany Abu-Assad	(Palestine)	Paradise Now	Nominated	
2007	Joseph Cedar	(Israel)	Beaufort	Nominated	
2007	Sergei Bodrov	(Kazakhstan)	Mongol	Nominated	
2008	Yōjirō Takita	(Japan)	Departures	Won	
2008	Ari Folman	(Israel)	Waltz with Bashir	Nominated	
2009	Scandar Copti; Yaron Shani	(Israel)	Ajami	Nominated	
2011	Asghar Farhadi	(Iran)	A Separation	Won	
2011	Joseph Cedar	(Israel)	Footnote	Nominated	
2013	Rithy Panh	(Cambodia)	The Missing Picture	Nominated	
2013	Hany Abu-Assad	(Palestine)	Omar	Nominated	
2015	Naji Abu Nowar	(Jordan)	Theeb	Nominated	
2016	Asghar Farhadi	(Iran)	The Salesman	Won	
2017	Ziad Doueiri	(Lebanon)	The Insult	Nominated	
2018	Nadine Labaki	(Lebanon)	Capernaum	Nominated	
2018	Hirokazu Kore-eda	(Japan)	Shoplifters	Nominated	
2019	Bong Joon-ho	(South Korea)	Parasite	Won	First Asian film to win (and second to be nominated for) Best Picture and Best International Feature.
2020	Derek Tsang	(Hong Kong)	Better Days	Nominated	
2021	Ryusuke Hamaguchi	(Japan)	Drive My Car	Won	Third Asian film to be nominated for Best International Feature and Best Picture.
2021	Pawo Choyning Dorji	(Bhutan)	Lunana: A Yak in the Classroom	Nominated	
2024	Mohammad Rasoulof	(Germany)	The Seed of the Sacred Fig	Nominated	Iranian descent.
2025	Jafar Panahi	(France)	It Was Just an Accident	Nominated	Iranian descent.

== Best Makeup and Hairstyling ==
Best Makeup and Hairstyling
Year	Name	Country	Film	Status	Notes
2006	Kazu Hiro	(United States) / (Japan)	Click	Nominated	Japanese descent. First Asian to be nominated for Best Makeup and Hairstyling (Shared with Bill Corso.)
2007	Kazu Hiro	(United States) / (Japan)	Norbit	Nominated	(Shared with Rick Baker.)
2017	Kazu Hiro	(United States) / (Japan)	Darkest Hour	Won	First Asian to win for Best Makeup and Hairstyling. (Shared with David Malinowski and Lucy Sibbick.)
2019	Kazu Hiro	(United States) / (Japan)	Bombshell	Won	Became a US citizen in 2019. (Shared with Anne Morgan and Vivian Baker.)
2021	Frederic Aspiras	(United States) / (Philippines) / (Vietnam)	House of Gucci	Nominated	Vietnamese-Filipino descent. Second Asian to be nominated for Best Makeup and Hairstyling. (Shared with Göran Lundström and Anna Carin Lock.)
2022	Judy Chin	(United States)	The Whale	Won	The first woman of Asian descent to win the Academy Award for Best Makeup and Hairstyling. (Shared with Adrien Morot and Annemarie Bradley.)
2023	Kazu Hiro	(United States) / (Japan)	Maestro	Nominated	(Shared with Kay Georgiou and Lori McCoy-Bell.)
2025	Kazu Hiro	(United States) / (Japan)	The Smashing Machine	Nominated	(Shared with Glen Griffin and Bjoern Rehbein.)
2025	Kyoko Toyokawa; Naomi Hibino; Tadashi Nishimatsu	(Japan)	Kokuho	Nominated	

== Best Production Design ==
Best Production Design
Year	Name	Country	Film	Status	Notes
1936	Eddie Imazu	(United States) / (Japan)	The Great Ziegfeld	Nominated	First Asian to be nominated for Best Production Design. (Shared with Cedric Gibbons and Edwin B. Willis.)
1942	Emile Kuri	(Mexico) / (United States) / (Lebanon)	Silver Queen	Nominated	Lebanese descent. Black and White.
1949	Emile Kuri	(Mexico) / (United States) / (Lebanon)	The Heiress	Won	Lebanese descent. The first Asian to win an Academy Award. Black and White.
1952	So Matsuyama; H. Matsumoto	(Japan)	Rashomon	Nominated	Japanese. Black and White.
1952	Emile Kuri	(Mexico) / (United States) / (Lebanon)	Carrie	Nominated	Lebanese descent. Black and White.
1954	Emile Kuri	(Mexico) / (United States) / (Lebanon)	20,000 Leagues Under the Sea	Won	Lebanese descent. Color
1954	Emile Kuri	(Mexico) / (United States) / (Lebanon)	Executive Suite	Nominated	Lebanese descent. Black and White.
1956	So Matsuyama	(Japan)	Seven Samurai	Nominated	Japanese descent.
1956	Albert Nozaki	(United States) / (Japan)	The Ten Commandments	Nominated	Japanese descent. Color. (Shared with Hal Pereira, Walter H. Tyler, Samuel M. Comer, and Ray Moyer.)
1961	Emile Kuri	(Mexico) / (United States) / (Lebanon)	The Absent-Minded Professor	Nominated	Black and White.
1964	Emile Kuri	(Mexico) / (United States) / (Lebanon)	Mary Poppins	Nominated	Color.
1969	George B. Chan	(United States) / (China)	Gaily, Gaily	Nominated	Chinese descent. (Shared with Robert F. Boyle, Edward G. Boyle, and Carl Biddiscombe.)
1971	Yoshirō Muraki and Taizô Kawashima	(Japan)	Tora! Tora! Tora!	Nominated	Japanese descent. (Shared with Jack Martin Smith and Richard Day.)
1972	Emile Kuri	(Mexico) / (United States) / (Lebanon)	Bedknobs and Broomsticks	Nominated	
1981	Yoshirō Muraki	(Japan)	Kagemusha	Nominated	Japanese descent.
1986	Yoshirō Muraki and Shinobu Muraki	(Japan)	Ran	Nominated	Japanese descent.
2001	Tim Yip	(Hong Kong)	Crouching Tiger, Hidden Dragon	Won	Hong Kong Chinese.
2008	James J. Murakami	(United States) / (Japan)	Changeling	Nominated	Japanese descent. (Shared with Gary Fettis.)
2013	Ra Vincent	(New Zealand)	The Hobbit: An Unexpected Journey	Nominated	Maori descent. (Production Design: Dan Hennah; Set Decoration: Ra Vincent and Simon Bright.)
2017	Paul Denham Austerberry	(Canada) / (United Kingdom) / (Philippines)	The Shape of Water	Won	Filipino descent. (Shared with Shane Vieau and Jeff Melvin.)
2020	Lee Ha-jun; Cho Won-woo	(South Korea)	Parasite	Nominated	

== Best Original Score ==
Best Original Score
Year	Name	Country	Film	Status	Notes
1966	Toshiro Mayuzumi	(Japan)	The Bible	Nominated	Japanese descent. First Asian to be nominated for Best Original Score.
1982	Ravi Shankar	(India)	Gandhi	Nominated	Indian descent. First Asian to be nominated for both Academy and Grammy Awards. (Shared with George Fenton)
1987	Cong Su; Ryuichi Sakamoto	(China) (Japan)	The Last Emperor	Won	Su is of Chinese descent. Sakamoto is of Japanese descent. First Asians to win Best Original Score. (Shared with David Byrne.)
1996	Gabriel Yared	(France) / (Lebanon)	The English Patient	Won	Lebanese descent.
1999	Gabriel Yared	(France) / (Lebanon)	The Talented Mr. Ripley	Nominated	Lebanese descent.
2000	Tan Dun	(China)	Crouching Tiger, Hidden Dragon	Won	Chinese descent.
2003	Gabriel Yared	(France) / (Lebanon)	Cold Mountain	Nominated	
2008	A. R. Rahman	(India)	Slumdog Millionaire	Won	First Indian to win two Oscars in one night.
2010	A. R. Rahman	(India)	127 Hours	Nominated	
2022	Ian Chang; Rafiq Bhatia	(Hong Kong) (United States) / (India) (Kenya)	Everything Everywhere All at Once	Nominated	Nominated as the group Son Lux, with Ryan Lott.

== Best Original Song ==
Best Original Song
Year	Name	Country	Film	Song	Status	Notes
1978	Paul Jabara	(United States) / (Lebanon)	Thank God It's Friday	"Last Dance"	Won	Lebanese descent.
2000	Tan Dun	(China)	Crouching Tiger, Hidden Dragon	"A Love Before Time"	Nominated	Chinese. (Shared with Jorge Calandrelli and James Schamus.)
2008	Gulzar; A.R. Rahman	(India)	Slumdog Millionaire	"Jai Ho"	Won	Indian.
2008	M.I.A. A.R. Rahman	(United Kingdom) / (Sri Lanka) (India)	Slumdog Millionaire	"O Saya"	Nominated	M.I.A. is of Sri Lankan descent.
2012	Bombay Jayashri	(India)	Life of Pi	"Pi's Lullaby"	Nominated	Indian. (Shared with Mychael Danna.)
2013	Robert Lopez	(United States) / (Philippines)	Frozen	"Let It Go"	Won	Part-Filipino descent (paternal grandfather is Filipino, paternal grandmother is part-Filipino). First Asian American to be nominated for Best Original Song. First Asian American to win Best Original Song. (Shared with Kristen Anderson-Lopez.)
2013	Karen O	(United States) / (Poland) / (South Korea)	Her	"The Moon Song"	Nominated	Half-Korean descent (mother is Korean, father is Polish). (Shared with Spike Jonze.)
2015	Belly	(Palestine) / (Canada)	Fifty Shades of Grey	"Earned It"	Nominated	Palestinian-born Canadian. (nominated with DaHeala, Stephan Moccio and The Weeknd)
2017	Robert Lopez	(United States) / (Philippines)	Coco	"Remember Me"	Won	(Shared with Kristen Anderson-Lopez.)
2019	Robert Lopez	(United States) / (Philippines)	Frozen II	"Into the Unknown"	Nominated	(Shared with Kristen Anderson-Lopez.)
2020	H.E.R.	(United States) / (Philippines)	Judas and the Black Messiah	"Fight for You"	Won	American born, of Filipino descent. (Shared with D'Mile & Tiara Thomas.)
2020	Savan Kotecha	(United States) / (India)	Eurovision Song Contest: The Story of Fire Saga	"Husavik"	Nominated	American born, of Indian descent. (Shared with Rickard Göransson & Fat Max Gsus.)
2022	M. M. Keeravani; Chandrabose	(India)	RRR	"Naatu Naatu"	Won	Indian (Telugu) descent.
2022	Mitski	(Japan) / (United States)	Everything Everywhere All at Once	"This is a Life"	Nominated	Japanese descent. (Shared with Ryan Lott & David Byrne.)
2025	Ejae; 24; Ido; Teddy	(South Korea)	KPop Demon Hunters	"Golden"	Won	(Shared with Mark Sonnenblick and Ian Eisendrath.)

== Best Sound ==
Prior to the 93rd Academy Awards, the Best Sound Mixing and Best Sound Editing were separate categories.

Best Sound
Year	Name	Country	Film	Category	Status	Notes
1999	Ren Klyce	(United States) / (Japan)	Fight Club	Editing	Nominated	Japanese descent. First Asian to be nominated for Best Sound Editing. First Asian American to be nominated for Best Sound Editing. (Shared with Richard Hymns.)
2006	Kami Asgar	(United States) / (Iran)	Apocalypto	Editing	Nominated	Iranian descent. First and only Middle Eastern to date to be nominated for Best Sound Editing. (Shared with Sean McCormack.)
2008	Ren Klyce	(United States) / (Japan)	The Curious Case of Benjamin Button	Mixing	Nominated	Japanese descent. First Asian to be nominated for Best Sound Mixing. First Asian American nominated for Best Sound Mixing. (Shared with David Parker, Michael Semanick & Mark Weingarten.)
2010	Ren Klyce	(United States) / (Japan)	The Social Network	Mixing	Nominated	(Shared with David Parker, Michael Semanick & Mark Weingarten.)
2011	Ren Klyce	(United States) / (Japan)	The Girl with the Dragon Tattoo	Mixing	Nominated	(Shared with David Parker, Michael Semanick & Bo Persson.)
2011	Ren Klyce	(United States) / (Japan)	The Girl with the Dragon Tattoo	Editing	Nominated	
2017	Ren Klyce	(United States) / (Japan)	Star Wars: The Last Jedi	Mixing	Nominated	(Shared with David Parker, Michael Semanick & Stuart Wilson.)
2017	Ren Klyce	(United States) / (Japan)	Star Wars: The Last Jedi	Editing	Nominated	(Shared with Matthew Wood.)
2020	Ren Klyce	(United States) / (Japan)	Mank	Sound	Nominated	(Shared with Jeremy Molod, David Parker, Nathan Nance & Drew Kunin.)
2020	Ren Klyce	(United States) / (Japan)	Soul	Sound	Nominated	(Shared with Coya Elliot & David Parker.)

== Best Visual Effects ==
Best Visual Effects
Year	Name	Country	Film	Status	Notes
1977	Greg Jein	(United States) / (China)	Close Encounters of the Third Kind	Nominated	Chinese descent. First Asian nominated for Best Visual Effects. First Asian American nominated for Best Visual Effects. (Shared with Roy Arbogast, Douglas Trumbull, Matthew Yuricich, and Richard Yuricich.)
1979	Greg Jein	(United States) / (China)	1941	Nominated	(Shared with William A. Fraker and A. D. Flowers.)
1992	Doug Chiang	(Taiwan) / (United States)	Death Becomes Her	Won	Chinese descent. First Asian to win Best Visual Effects. (Shared with Ken Ralston, Douglas Smythe, and Tom Woodruff Jr.)
1993	Ariel Velasco Shaw	(United States) / (Philippines)	The Nightmare Before Christmas	Nominated	Filipino descent. First person of Filipino descent to be nominated for Best Visual Effects. (Shared with Pete Kozachik, Eric Leighton, and Gordon Baker.)
1999	Jerome Chen	(United States) / (China)	Stuart Little	Nominated	Chinese descent. (Shared with John Dykstra, Henry F. Anderson III, & Eric Allard.)
2023	Takashi Yamazaki; Kiyoko Shibuya; Masaki Takahashi; Tatsuji Nojima	(Japan)	Godzilla Minus One	Won	First Japanese production to win for Best Visual Effects.
2025	Charmaine Chan	(United States) / (China)	Jurassic World Rebirth	Nominated	Chinese descent. (Shared with David Vickery, Stephen Aplin, and Neil Corbould)

== Best Documentary Feature ==
Best Documentary Feature
Year	Name	Country	Film	Status	Notes
1985	Steven Okazaki	(United States) / (Japan)	Unfinished Business	Nominated	Japanese descent. First Asian nominated for Best Documentary Feature. First Asian American nominated for Best Documentary Feature.
1988	Renee Tajima-Peña	(United States) / (Japan)	Who Killed Vincent Chin?	Nominated	Tajima-Peña is of Japanese descent. (Shared with Christine Choy.)
1994	Freida Lee Mock	(United States) / (China)	Maya Lin: A Strong Clear Vision	Won	Chinese descent. First Asian to win Best Documentary Feature. First Asian American to win Best Documentary Feature. (Shared with Terry Sanders.)
2010	Audrey Marrs	(United States) / (Japan)	Inside Job	Won	Half-Japanese descent (mother is Japanese)
2011	Jehane Noujaim	(United States) / (Lebanon)	The Square	Nominated	Lebanese descent
2014	Joanna Natasegara	(United Kingdom) / (Malaysia) / (Japan)	Virunga	Nominated	Malaysian and Japanese descent. (Shared with Orlando von Einsiedel.)
2014	John Maloof	(Lebanon) / (United States)	Finding Vivian Maier	Nominated	Lebanese descent.
2015	Asif Kapadia	(United Kingdom) / (India)	Amy	Won	Indian descent (Shared with James Gay-Rees.)
2018	Elizabeth Chai Vasarhelyi; Jimmy Chin	(Hong Kong) (Hungary) (Brazil) (United States)	Free Solo	Won	Vasarhelyi is of Chinese, Hong Kong, Hungarian, and Brazilian descent. Chin is of Chinese and Taiwanese descent. They are the first married couple of Asian descent to share a nomination. (Shared with Evan Hayes and Shannon Dill.)
2018	Elizabeth Chai Vasarhelyi; Jimmy Chin	(China) / (Taiwan) / (United States)	Free Solo	Won	Vasarhelyi is of Chinese, Hong Kong, Hungarian, and Brazilian descent. Chin is of Chinese and Taiwanese descent. They are the first married couple of Asian descent to share a nomination. (Shared with Evan Hayes and Shannon Dill.)
2018	Bing Liu; Diane Moy Quon	(United States) / (China)	Minding the Gap	Nominated	Liu and Moy Quon are of Chinese descent.
2018	Su Kim	(United States) / (South Korea)	Hale County This Morning, This Evening	Nominated	Korean descent. (nominated with RaMell Ross and Joslyn Barnes.)
2019	Joanna Natasegara	(United Kingdom) / (Malaysia) / (Japan)	The Edge of Democracy	Nominated	(Shared with Petra Costa, Shane Boris and Tiago Pavan.)
2019	Waad Al-Kateab	(Syria)	For Sama	Nominated	(Shared with Edward Watts.)
2021	Joseph Patel	(India) / (United States)	Summer of Soul	Won	(Shared with Questlove, Robert Fyvolent, and David Dinerstein)
2021	Jessica Kingdon	(Taiwan) / (United States)	Ascension	Nominated	(Shared with Kira Simon-Kennedy and Nathan Truesdell)
2022	Aman Mann	(Canada) / (India)	All That Breathes	Nominated	Canadian of Indian descent.
2023	Nisha Pahuja	(Canada) / (India)	To Kill a Tiger	Nominated	Canadian of Indian descent. (Shared with Cornelia Principe and David Oppenheim)
2024	Shiori Itō	(Japan)	Black Box Diaries	Nominated	(Shared with Eric Nyari and Hanna Aqvilin.)
2024	Basel Adra; Rachel Szor; Hamdan Ballal; Yuval Abraham	(Palestine) (Israel)	No Other Land	Won	Adra and Ballal are the first Palestinians to win Academy Awards.
2025	Mohammadreza Eyni; Sara Khaki	(Iran) / (United States)	Cutting Through Rocks	Nominated	
2025	Geeta Gandbhir	(India) / (United States)	The Perfect Neighbor	Nominated	(Shared with Alisa Payne, Nikon Kwantu, and Sam Bisbee)

== Best Animated Feature ==
Best Animated Feature
Year	Name	Country	Film	Status	Notes
2002	Hayao Miyazaki	(Japan)	Spirited Away	Won	Japanese descent.
2005	Hayao Miyazaki	(Japan)	Howl's Moving Castle	Nominated	Japanese descent.
2007	Marjane Satrapi	(Iran) (France)	Persepolis	Nominated	Iranian descent. (Shared with Vincent Paronnaud.)
2011	Jennifer Yuh Nelson	(South Korea) / (United States)	Kung Fu Panda 2	Nominated	Korean descent. First woman to direct a Hollywood animated feature film.
2013	Hayao Miyazaki; Toshio Suzuki	(Japan)	The Wind Rises	Nominated	Japanese descent.
2014	Isao Takahata; Yoshiaki Nishimura	(Japan)	The Tale of the Princess Kaguya	Nominated	Japanese descent.
2015	Rosa Tran	(United States) / (Vietnam)	Anomalisa	Nominated	Vietnamese descent. (Shared with Charlie Kaufman and Duke Johnson.)
2015	Hiromasa Yonebayashi; Yoshiaki Nishimura	(Japan)	When Marnie Was There	Nominated	Japanese descent.
2016	Toshio Suzuki	(Japan)	The Red Turtle	Nominated	Japanese descent. (Shared with Michaël Dudok de Wit.)
2017	Ramsey Naito	(United States) / (Japan)	The Boss Baby	Nominated	Japanese descent. (Shared with Tom McGrath.)
2018	Mamoru Hosoda; Yuichiro Saito	(Japan)	Mirai	Nominated	Japanese descent.
2019	Jinko Gotoh	(United States) / (Japan)	Klaus	Nominated	Born in Japan and raised in California. (Shared with Sergio Pablos and Marisa Román.)
2020	Gennie Rim	(United States) / (China)	Over the Moon	Nominated	Chinese descent.
2020	Peilin Chou	(United States) / (China)	Over the Moon	Nominated	Chinese descent.
2022	Domee Shi	(Canada) / (China)	Turning Red	Nominated	Chinese descent. (Shared with Lindsey Collins)
2023	Hayao Miyazaki; Toshio Suzuki	(Japan)	The Boy and the Heron	Won	
2023	Peter Sohn	(United States) / (South Korea)	Elemental	Nominated	Korean descent (Shared with Denise Ream)
2025	Maggie Kang; Michelle L.M. Wong	(South Korea) / (Canada)	KPop Demon Hunters	Won	(Shared with Chris Appelhans)
2025	Domee Shi	(Canada) / (China)	Elio	Nominated	(Shared with Madeline Sharafian, Adrian Molina, and Mary Alice Drumm)
2025	Liane-Cho Han	(France)	Little Amélie or the Character of Rain	Nominated	Shared with Maïlys Vallade, Nidia Santiago and Henri Magalon.

== Best Documentary Short Subject ==
Best Documentary Short Subject
Year	Name	Country	Film	Status	Notes
1982	Freida Lee Mock	(United States) / (China)	To Live or Let Die	Nominated	First Asian American nominated for Best Documentary Short Subject.
1983	Arthur Dong	(United States) / (China)	Sewing Woman	Nominated	Chinese descent.
1984	Paul T.K. Lin	(Canada) / (China)	The Children of Soong Ching Ling	Nominated	Chinese descent. (Shared with Gary Bush.)
1988	Lise Yasui	(United States) / (Japan)	Family Gathering	Nominated	Japanese descent. (Shared with Ann Tegnell.)
1990	Freida Lee Mock	(United States) / (China)	Rose Kennedy: A Life to Remember	Nominated	(Shared with Terry Sanders.)
1990	Steven Okazaki	(United States) / (Japan)	Days of Waiting: The Life & Art of Estelle Ishigo	Won	First Asian to win Best Documentary Short Subject. First Asian American to win Best Documentary Short Subject.
1995	Freida Lee Mock	(United States) / (China)	Never Give Up: The 20th Century Odyssey of Herbert Zipper	Nominated	(Shared with Terry Sanders.)
1996	Jessica Yu	(United States) / (China)	Breathing Lessons: The Life and Work of Mark O'Brien	Won	Chinese descent.
1998	Keiko Ibi	(United States) / (Japan)	The Personals: Improvisations on Romance in the Golden Years	Won	Japanese descent.
1998	Shui-Bo Wang	(Canada) / (China)	Sunrise Over Tiananmen Square	Nominated	Chinese descent. (Shared with Donald McWilliams.)
2001	Freida Lee Mock	(United States) / (China)	Sing!	Nominated	Tied for second most Oscar-nominated Asian of all time, with five nominations. (Shared with Jessica Sanders.)
2005	Steven Okazaki	(United States) / (Japan)	The Mushroom Club	Nominated	
2006	Ruby Yang	(Hong Kong) / (China)	The Blood of Yingzhou District	Won	(Shared with Thomas Lennon.)
2008	Steven Okazaki	(United States) / (Japan)	The Conscience of Nhem En	Nominated	Tied for third most Oscar-nominated Asian of all time, with four nominations.
2011	Sharmeen Obaid-Chinoy	(Pakistan) / (Canada)	Saving Face	Won	Pakistani descent. (Shared with Daniel Junge.)
2015	Sharmeen Obaid-Chinoy	(Pakistan) / (Canada)	A Girl in the River: The Price of Forgiveness	Won	
2016	Joanna Natasegara	(United Kingdom) / (Malaysia) / (Japan)	The White Helmets	Won	Malaysian and Japanese descent. (Shared with Orlando von Einsiedel.)
2018	Rayka Zehtabchi	(United States) / (Iran)	Period. End of Sentence.	Won	Iranian descent. (Shared with Melissa Berton.)
2019	Smriti Mundhra; Sami Khan	(United States) / (India)	St. Louis Superman	Nominated	Indian descent.
2022	Kartiki Gonsalves; Guneet Monga	(India)	The Elephant Whisperers	Won	
2023	S. Leo Chiang; Jean Tsien	(United States) (Taiwan)	Island in Between	Nominated	
2023	Sean Wang	(United States) (Taiwan)	Nǎi Nai & Wài Pó	Nominated	(Shared with Sam Davis.)
2024	Smriti Mundhra	(United States) / (India)	I Am Ready, Warden	Nominated	Indian descent. (Shared with Maya Gnyp.)
2024	Ema Ryan Yamazaki	(United Kingdom) / (Japan)	Instruments of a Beating Heart	Nominated	(Shared with Eric Nyari.)
2025	Geeta Gandbhir	(India) / (United States)	The Devil Is Busy	Nominated	(Shared with Christalyn Hampton.)

== Best Animated Short Film ==
Best Animated Short Film
Year	Name	Country	Film	Status	Notes
1968	Jimmy T. Murakami	(United States) / (Japan)	The Magic Pear Tree	Nominated	Japanese descent. First Asian nominated for Best Animated Short Film. First Asian American nominated for Best Animated Short Film.
2002	Kōji Yamamura	(Japan)	Mt. Head	Nominated	
2008	Kunio Kato	(Japan)	La maison en petits cubes	Won	Japanese descent first Asian to win for Best Animated short film
2010	Shaun Tan	(Australia) / (China)	The Lost Thing	Won	Half-Chinese descent (father is Chinese) (Shared with Andrew Ruhemann.)
2011	Minkyu Lee	(United States) / (South Korea)	Adam and Dog	Nominated	Korean descent.
2014	Robert Kondo; Daisuke Tsutsumi	(United States) / (Japan) (Japan)	The Dam Keeper	Nominated	Japanese descent.
2015	Sanjay Patel	(United States) / (India)	Sanjay's Super Team	Nominated	Indian descent. (Shared with Nicole Paradis Grindle.)
2017	Ru Kuwahata	(United States) / (Japan)	Negative Space	Nominated	Japanese descent. (Shared with her husband, Max Porter.)
2018	Domee Shi	(Canada) / (China)	Bao	Won	Chinese descent. (Shared with Becky Neiman-Cobb.)
2018	Trevor Jimenez	(Canada) / (Philippines)	Weekends	Nominated	Filipino descent.
2018	Bobby Pontillas	(United States) / (Philippines)	One Small Step	Nominated	Filipino descent. (Shared with Andrew Chesworth.)
2019	Siqi Song	(China)	Sister	Nominated	Chinese descent.
2020	Madeline Sharafian	(United States) / (Armenia)	Burrow	Nominated	Armenian descent. (Shared with Michael Capbarat.)
2023	Tal Kantor Amit R. Gicelter	(Israel)	Letter to a Pig	Nominated	
2023	Yegane Moghaddam	(Iran)	Our Uniform	Nominated	
2024	Shirin Sohani; Hossein Molayemi	(Iran)	In the Shadow of the Cypress	Won	
2024	Daisuke Nishio; Takashi Washio	(Japan)	Magic Candies	Nominated	

== Best Live Action Short Film ==
Best Live Action Short Film
Year	Name	Country	Film	Status	Notes
1977	Yuki Yoshida	(Japan) / (Canada)	I'll Find a Way	Won	Japanese descent. (Shared with Beverly Shaffer.)
1982	Michael Toshiyuki Uno	(Japan) / (United States)	The Silence	Nominated	Japanese descent. First Asian American nominated for Best Live Action Short Film. (Shared with Joseph Benson.)
1988	Matia Karrell	(United States) / (Lebanon)	Cadillac Dreams	Nominated	Lebanese descent.
1997	Chris Tashima	(Japan) / (United States)	Visas and Virtue	Won	Japanese descent (father is Japanese). First Asian American to win Best Live Action Short Film. (Shared with Chris Donahue.)
1999	Mehdi Norowzian	(Iran) / (United Kingdom)	Killing Joe	Won	Iranian descent. (Shared with Steve Wax.)
2002	Lexi Alexander	(Germany) / (Palestine)	Johnny Flynton	Nominated	Half-Palestinian descent (mother is German, father is Palestinian). (Shared with Alexander Buono.)
2005	Pia Clemente	(Philippines) / (United States)	Our Time is Up	Nominated	Filipino descent. (Shared with Rob Pearlstein.)
2013	Baldwin Li	(China) / (United Kingdom)	The Voorman Problem	Nominated	(Shared with Mark Gill.)
2020	Farah Nabulsi	(Palestine) / (United Kingdom)	The Present	Nominated	Palestinian descent (mother is Palestinian, father is Palestinian-Egyptian).
2021	Riz Ahmed; Aneil Karia	(United Kingdom) / (Pakistan) (United Kingdom) / (India)	The Long Goodbye	Won	
2023	Nazrin Choudhury	(Bangladesh) / (United Kingdom)	Red, White, and Blue	Nominated	Bangladeshi descent (Shared with Sara McFarlane.)
2024	Suchitra Mattai	(Guyana) / (United States) / (India)	Anuja	Nominated	Guyanese-born and Indian descent (Shared with Adam J. Graves.)

== Honorary Awards ==
Academy Honorary Awards
Year	Name	Country	Award
1989	Akira Kurosawa	(Japan)	Academy Honorary Award for cinematic accomplishments that have inspired, delighted, enriched and entertained worldwide audiences and influenced filmmakers throughout the world.
1991	Satyajit Ray	(India)	Academy Honorary Award in recognition of his rare mastery of the art of motion pictures, and of his profound humanitarian outlook, which has had an indelible influence on filmmakers and audiences throughout the world.
2014	Hayao Miyazaki	(Japan)	Academy Honorary Award has deeply influenced animation forever, inspiring generations of artists to work in our medium and illuminate its limitless potential.
2016	Jackie Chan	(Hong Kong)	Academy Honorary Award; Chan starred in – and sometimes wrote, directed and produced – more than 30 martial arts features in his native Hong Kong, charming audiences with his dazzling athleticism, inventive stunt work and boundless charisma.

== Non-Competitive Awards ==
Non-Competitive Awards
Year	Name	Country	Award
2004	Takuo Miyagishima	(Japan) / (United States)	Gordon E. Sawyer Award; Takuo Miyagishima, one of the most notable design engineers in the motion picture industry, has been voted the Gordon E. Sawyer Award by the Board of Governors of the Academy of Motion Picture Arts and Sciences.

== See also ==
- List of Asian Golden Globe winners and nominees
- List of Asian Tony Award winners and nominees
