= Charles Bernstein (composer) =

American composer (b. 1943)

- Born: Charles Bernstein; February 28, 1943 (age 83); Minneapolis, Minnesota, U.S.
- Genres: Film score; television score
- Occupations: Composer; orchestrator
- Years active: 1969–present

Charles Bernstein (born February 28, 1943) is an American composer of film and television scores. He is a Daytime Emmy Award winner, and a two-time Primetime Emmy Award nominee. Since 1995, he has been a member of the Board of Governors of the Academy of Motion Picture Arts and Sciences' Music Branch. He has also been a member of the Board of Directors for both the American Society of Composers, Authors and Publishers and the Society of Composers & Lyricists.

== Early life and education ==
Bernstein was born in Minneapolis to mother Mildred Wolf (1910–2011) and father Charles Bernstein, Sr. (d. 1952). His mother was a pianist. As for his father, he "was involved in writing and producing music in his early career," according to Bernstein. Bernstein also has a sister Carol Auslander and a stepfather Julius Wolf. Bernstein studied music at the Juilliard School.

Though they share a surname and an occupation, he is not related to composers Elmer Bernstein and Leonard Bernstein.

== Career ==
Bernstein did his first score for the 1969 Oscar-winning documentary, Czechoslovakia 1968. According to Bernstein, "I met the director, Denis Sanders, through friends at UCLA. It was a brilliant film, and I convinced Denis that I knew what sort of music would tell the story of the small country's invasion by its two most powerful neighbors. The film was unusual because it had no spoken words, only music and occasional sound effects to tell the story."

Bernstein's early film scores included the B movies The Man from O.R.G.Y. (1970), Sweet Kill (1972, the directorial debut of Curtis Hanson), Invasion of the Bee Girls (1973, also directed by Sanders), and the cult Western horror film Hex (also 1973).

His first score for a major Hollywood studio was for the United Artists film, White Lightning (1973), starring Burt Reynolds. The film marked the first of many collaborations between Bernstein and director Joseph Sargent. Bernstein also scored the sequel to the film, Gator (1976). Other films Bernstein scored during the 1970s include That Man Bolt (1973), Mr. Majestyk (1974), Trackdown (1976), A Small Town in Texas (1976), Viva Knievel! (1977), Outlaw Blues (1977) and Love at First Bite (1979). He even wrote the dance music in the latter film.

During the 1980s, Bernstein scored the music for the horror films The Entity (1982), Cujo (1983), April Fool's Day (1986) and Deadly Friend (1986). Bernstein also scored non-horror films such as Foolin' Around (1980).

He continued to score music for documentaries such as Maya Lin: A Strong Clear Vision (1994) and After Innocence (2005), with the former winning the Academy Award for Best Documentary. He also scored music for made-for-television movies such as Sadat (1983), Miss Evers' Boys (1997), The Long Island Incident (1998) and Out of the Ashes (2003).

Bernstein reunited with Cujo director Lewis Teague to score his independent films, Cante Jondo (2007) and Charlotta-TS (2010).

=== A Nightmare on Elm Street ===
Under the recommendation of his agent, Bernstein met with Wes Craven and was hired to score his film, A Nightmare on Elm Street (1984). On working with Craven: "Wes was easy to work with, he gave me a lot of freedom, but we could discuss ideas and approaches. In many ways he was an ideal director to communicate with because he listened well and was open to all ideas." Bernstein used an electronic score since the film had a small budget.

Bernstein did not return to score the music for the other films in the franchise, though Renny Harlin briefly talked to him about scoring the fourth film.

=== Use of his music ===
Quentin Tarantino has included Bernstein's music from White Lightning and The Entity in the soundtracks of his films Kill Bill: Volume 1 (2003) and Inglourious Basterds (2009). Various hip hop artists have sampled Bernstein’s film scores, such as Logic, who has used his music from Love at First Bite for his song Vinyl Days, as well as Drake & 21 Savage, who have used a choral sample of his music from Invasion of the Bee Girls for their song Rich Flex.

== Other activities ==
In addition to film composing, Bernstein is also the author of two books. One of them is titled Film Music and Everything Else. The other is Movie Music: An Insider’s View. He has also taught courses in the University of Southern California and the University of California, Los Angeles.

Bernstein has been a long-serving member of the Board of Governors of the Academy of Motion Picture Arts and Sciences since 1995. He is also in the Board of Directors for both the American Society of Composers, Authors and Publishers and the Society of Composers & Lyricists. He co-founded the latter organization.

== Personal life ==
Bernstein is married to Georgianne Cowan. They have one daughter, Serina. They reside in Los Angeles.

== Filmography ==
=== Film ===
Year	Title	Director
1969	Stoney	Wray Davis
1970	The Man from O.R.G.Y.	James Hill
1972	Daddy's Deadly Darling	Marc Lawrence
1972	Sweet Kill	Curtis Hanson
1973	Invasion of the Bee Girls	Denis Sanders
1973	Hex	Leo Garen
1973	White Lightning	Joseph Sargent
1973	That Man Bolt	David Lowell Rich; Henry Levin
1974	Mr. Majestyk	Richard Fleischer
1976	The Zebra Force	Joe Tornatore
1976	Trackdown	Richard T. Heffron
1976	A Small Town in Texas	Jack Starrett
1976	Gator	Burt Reynolds
1977	Viva Knievel!	Gordon Douglas
1977	Outlaw Blues	Richard T. Heffron
1979	Love at First Bite	Stan Dragoti
1980	Coast to Coast	Joseph Sargent
1980	Foolin' Around	Richard T. Heffron
1982	The Entity	Sidney J. Furie
1983	Independence Day	Robert Mandel
1983	Cujo	Lewis Teague
1984	A Nightmare on Elm Street	Wes Craven
1986	Deadly Friend	Wes Craven
1986	April Fool's Day	Fred Walton
1987	The Allnighter	Tamar Simon Hoffs
1987	Dudes	Penelope Spheeris
1993	Excessive Force	Jon Hess
1995	Out of Annie's Past	Stuart Cooper
1995	Rumpelstiltskin	Mark Jones
1997	When Danger Follows You Home	David Peckinpah
2007	Fighting Words	E. Paul Edwards
2008	Shattered!	Chris St. Croix
2010	Charlotta-TS	Lewis Teague
2017	Liza, Liza, Skies Are Grey	Terry Sanders

=== Television ===
==== TV series ====
Year	Title	Notes
1977	Special Treat	Episode: "Five Finger Discount"
1978	Who's Watching the Kids?	21 episodes
1987	CBS Schoolbreak Special	Episode: "Little Miss Perfect"
2000	American Experience	Episode: "Return with Honor"
2002–06	Alejo & Valentina	52 episodes
2009	Nova	Episode: "Darwin's Darkest Hour"

==== TV movies and miniseries ====
Year	Title
1975	A Shadow in the Streets
1976	Look What's Happened to Rosemary's Baby
1976	Nightmare in Badham County
1977	Escape from Bogen County
1977	Four Against the Desert
1978	Wild and Wooly
1978	Thaddeus Rose and Eddie
1978	Cops and Robin
1978	Steel Cowboy
1978	Fast Lane Blues
1978	Are You in the House Alone?
1978	Katie: Portrait of a Centerfold
1978	The Winds of Kitty Hawk
1979	Women at West Point
1979	The House on Garibaldi Street
1980	Bogie
1980	Scruples
1983	Sadat
1985	Secret Weapons
1985	Malice in Wonderland
1985	Generation
1985	Covenant
1985	The Long Hot Summer
1985	Chase
1986	Rockabye
1987	The Last Fling
1987	Ghost of a Chance
1987	The Man Who Broke 1,000 Chains
1988	A Whisper Kills
1989	Desperate for Love
1989	Love and Betrayal
1990	Drug Wars: The Camarena Story
1990	Too Young to Die?
1990	Fall from Grace
1990	Caroline?
1990	Ivory Hunters
1990	She Said No
1990	The Love She Sought
1991	Payoff
1991	Guilty Until Proven Innocent
1991	Love, Lies and Murder
1991	Yes Virginia, There Is a Santa Claus
1992	Drug Wars: The Cocaine Cartel
1992	Trial: The Price of Passion
1992	Somebody's Daughter
1993	Between Love and Hate
1993	The Sea Wolf
1993	Final Appeal
1994	My Name Is Kate
1996	Sophie & the Moonhanger
1996	Dead Ahead
1996	Bloodhounds II
1997	Miss Evers' Boys
1997	The Ticket
1998	The Hunted
1998	The Long Island Incident
2000	Picnic
2000	Enslavement: The True Story of Fanny Kemble
2001	The Day the World Ended
2002	Crossing the Line
2002	A Christmas Visitor
2003	Profoundly Normal
2003	Out of the Ashes
2004	Family Sins
2007	Sybil
2008	Sweet Nothing in My Ear
2015	Sharktopus vs. Whalewolf

=== Documentary works ===
Year	Title	Director
1969	Czechoslovakia 1968	Denis Sanders; Robert M. Fresco
1990	Rose Kennedy: A Life to Remember	Terry Sanders
1994	Maya Lin: A Strong Clear Vision	Freida Lee Mock
1999	Return with Honor	Freida Lee Mock; Terry Sanders
2005	After Innocence	Jessica Sanders
2007	Refusenik	Laura Bialis
2014	Jesus Town, USA	Billie Mintz; Julian T. Pinder
2019	Battlefield: Home: Breaking the Silence	Anita Sugimura Holsapple

== Awards and nominations ==
Award	Year	Category	Work	Result
CableACE Award	1989	Best Original Score	The Man Who Broke 1,000 Chains	Nominated
Daytime Emmy Award	1987	Outstanding Achievement in Music Direction and Composition	CBS Schoolbreak Special ("Little Miss Perfect")	Won
Primetime Emmy Award	1993	Outstanding Music Composition for a Limited or Anthology Series, Movie or Special	The Sea Wolf	Nominated
Primetime Emmy Award	2000	Outstanding Music Composition for a Limited or Anthology Series, Movie or Special	Enslavement: The True Story of Fanny Kemble	Nominated
