= Anita: Speaking Truth to Power =

- Theatrical release poster
- Directed by: Freida Mock
- Written by: Freida Mock
- Produced by: Freida Mock
- Starring: Anita Hill
- Cinematography: Bestor Cram; Don Lenzer; Erik Daarstad
- Edited by: Brian Johnson
- Music by: Lili Haydn
- Production companies: American Film Foundation; Chanlim Films; Impact Partners; Artemis Rising Foundation; ITVS
- Distributed by: Samuel Goldwyn Films
- Release dates: January 20, 2013 (Sundance); March 21, 2014 (United States)
- Running time: 76 minutes
- Country: United States
- Language: English
- Box office: $176,979

Anita: Speaking Truth to Power is a 2013 American documentary film, written, directed, and produced by Freida Mock. It follows Anita Hill, a lawyer who testified against Clarence Thomas's Supreme Court nomination, exposing the problem of sexual harassment around the world.

The film had its world premiere at the Sundance Film Festival on January 20, 2013. It was released on March 21, 2014, by Samuel Goldwyn Films.

== Synopsis ==
The film follows lawyer Anita Hill who testifies against Clarence Thomas's Supreme Court nomination, exposing the problem of sexual harassment around the world. It also follows Hill after the testimony as she continues to raise awareness of sexual harassment in the workplace.

== Release ==
The film had its world premiere at the Sundance Film Festival on January 20, 2013. It also screened at the AFI Docs on June 22, 2013. In August 2013, Samuel Goldwyn Films acquired U.S. distribution rights to the film. It was released on March 21, 2014.

=== Critical reception ===
Anita: Speaking Truth to Power It holds a 79% approval rating on review aggregator website Rotten Tomatoes, based on 33 reviews, with a weighted average of 6.70/10. On Metacritic, the film holds a rating of 68 out of 100, based on 15 critics, indicating "generally favorable" reviews.
