= Ruth: Justice Ginsburg in Her Own Words =

- Official poster
- Directed by: Freida Lee Mock
- Written by: Freida Lee Mock; M.A. Golán
- Produced by: Freida Lee Mock
- Cinematography: Jon Shenk; Don Lenzer; Erich Roland; Rob Rainey
- Edited by: M.A. Golán
- Music by: Lili Haydn
- Production companies: Sanders and Mock Productions; American Film Foundation; Artemis Rising Foundation
- Distributed by: Kino Lorber; Virgil Films
- Release dates: June 22, 2019 (AFI Docs); February 12, 2021 (United States)
- Running time: 89 minutes
- Country: United States
- Language: English

Ruth: Justice Ginsburg in Her Own Words is a 2019 American documentary film, directed and produced by Freida Lee Mock, written by Mock and M.A. Golán. It follows Ruth Bader Ginsburg, the second female Supreme Court of the United States Associate Justice.

The film had its world premiere at AFI Docs on June 22, 2019. It was released through virtual cinema on February 12, 2021, followed by video on demand on March 9, 2021, by Kino Lorber and Virgil Films.

== Synopsis ==
The film follows Ruth Bader Ginsburg, the second female Supreme Court of the United States Associate Justice. Goodwin Liu, Erwin Chemerinsky, Irin Carmon, Shana Knizhnik, Jennifer Carroll Foy, M.E. Freeman, Lilly Ledbetter and Kathleen Peratis appear in the film.

== Production ==
In 2015, Regina K. Scully and Geralyn Dreyfous approached Freida Lee Mock about making a documentary film revolving around Ruth Bader Ginsburg. Mock agreed and wrote to Bader Ginsburg who stated to wait until On the Basis of Sex had been released. Principal photography on the film began in mid-2017, with Mock conducing hours of research and going through hundreds of hours of footage of Ginsburg to shape the film.

== Release ==
The film had its world premiere at AFI Docs on June 22, 2019. In September 2020, it was announced the film was being screened digitally to various film distributors, with the goal of having the film released prior to the 2020 United States presidential election. In January 2021, Virgil Films and Kino Lorber acquired U.S. distribution rights to the film, and set it for a virtual cinema release on February 12, 2021, prior to video on demand on March 9, 2021. That same month, Starz acquired television rights to the film, and broadcast it on March 1, 2021.

== Reception ==
Ruth: Justice Ginsburg in Her Own Words holds a 94% approval rating on review aggregator website Rotten Tomatoes, based on 16 reviews, with an average of 7/10. The site's critical consensus reads, "This assembly of archival footage doesn't distinguish itself from other documentaries about Ruth Bader Ginsburg's life, but it does offer a heartfelt glimpse into her judicial philosophy In Her Own Words." On Metacritic, the film holds a rating of 58 out of 100, based on 4 critics, indicating "mixed or average reviews".
