= Jessica Sanders =

American filmmaker

Jessica Sanders is an American producer, director and screenwriter.

== Accolades ==
Together with Freida Lee Mock, Sanders was a nominee for the Best Short Documentary in 2001 for the film Sing!. Further, she won the Special Jury Prize at the Sundance Film Festival 2005 for the documentary After Innocence.
