= Grace Nash =

American music educator and violinist (1909–2010)

Grace Elinor Chapman Nash (November 19, 1909—November 9, 2010) was an American music educator, writer, and violinist.

== Biography ==
Born in Garrettsville, Ohio on November 19, 1909, Grace Chapman was one of five siblings, all of whom received piano lessons from their mother. She was educated at Hiram College and Ohio Wesleyan University, receiving her bachelor's degree in French and music from the latter in 1930 and became an English and music teacher at the junior high school level. In 1936, she completed her master's degree in performance and composition at the Chicago Musical College. That same year, she married Ralph Nash; soon thereafter she took a position as assistant concertmaster with the Manila Symphony Orchestra. In 1942, during the Japanese invasion of the Philippines, she and her family were imprisoned by the Japanese, being released in 1945; she later told the story of their ordeal in That We Might Live, published in 1984. Returning to the United States, Nash taught music theory and violin in the area around Chicago. In 1989, she became the first recipient of the Distinguished Service Award from the American Orff-Schulwerk Association. In 1991, she received a lifetime achievement award from Hiram College. Upon her husband's death in 1992, Nash moved to a retirement community in Tallahassee, Florida. She taught her last workshops at Florida State University. She died in Tallahassee on November 9, 2010, survived by a sister and by her three sons.
