= Wrestling with Angels: Playwright Tony Kushner =

Wrestling With Angels: Playwright Tony Kushner
- Directed by: Freida Lee Mock
- Written by: Freida Lee Mock
- Produced by: Freida Lee Mock
- Starring: Tony Kushner
- Cinematography: Ed Marritz
- Edited by: Anne Stein
- Distributed by: Balcony Releasing
- Release date: 2006
- Running time: 98 min.
- Language: English

Wrestling with Angels: Playwright Tony Kushner is a 2006 documentary film that follows the personal and political life of Tony Kushner, leading American playwright and author of the epochal Angels in America. The film begins in 2001 and ends in 2004, tracing the production of his play Homebody/Kabul, his marriage to Mark Harris, and his work on John Kerry's presidential campaign.

Wrestling with Angels was written, produced, and directed by the award-winning filmmaker Freida Lee Mock and aired on PBS in 2007 as part of the P.O.V. series. The film was met with critical praise and received a 72% "Fresh" rating on Rotten Tomatoes.
