= Sunrise Over Tiananmen Square =

1998 animated short documentary

- Directed by: Shui-Bo Wang
- Produced by: Don McWilliams
- Narrated by: Shui-Bo Wang
- Cinematography: Pierre Landry; Lynda Pelley
- Edited by: Don McWilliams
- Distributed by: National Film Board of Canada
- Release date: October 16, 1998
- Running time: 29 minutes
- Country: Canada
- Language: English

Sunrise Over Tiananmen Square (French: Le jour se lève sur la place Tienanmen) is a 1998 short animated documentary directed by Shui-Bo Wang and distributed by the National Film Board of Canada.

== Summary ==
It is an autobiography about the director's life, career and ultimate disillusionment with the Chinese Communist Party.

== Accolades ==
It was nominated for an Academy Award for Best Documentary Short, but lost to The Personals.

Other honours for the film included the Gemini Award for Best History/Biography Documentary program, the Yorkton Film Festival Golden Sheaf Award for Best Documentary Short Subject, and the award for Best Short Documentary at Hot Docs.
