= Portrait of Zubin Mehta =

1968 film directed by Terry Sanders

Portrait of Zubin Mehta (1968) is a 38-min. documentary film by Terry Sanders about the life of the conductor Zubin Mehta.

The documentary has been filmed in Bombay and Los Angeles. In the film, the camera follows Zubin Mehta over a length of time – during rehearsals, meetings, performances and backstage activities, as well as on a tour with the orchestra during which he visited his birthplace, Bombay. The film ends with a ten-minute rendition of the last section of the Ravel arrangement of Mussorgsky's "Pictures at an exhibition", during which the camera never leaves the conductor.
