= Four Stones for Kanemitsu =

1973 film

- Produced by: June Wayne
- Starring: Matsumi Kanemitsu
- Cinematography: Eric Daarstad and Terry Sanders
- Edited by: Jax Cambas
- Production company: Tamarind Institute
- Distributed by: Tamarind Institute
- Release date: 1973
- Running time: 28 minutes
- Country: United States
- Language: English

Four Stones for Kanemitsu is a 1973 American short documentary film, written and produced by June Wayne and filmed by Terry Sanders. It was nominated for an Academy Award for Best Documentary Short. The film is educational and records in details each of the steps in making of a color lithograph by artist, Matsumi Kanemitsu.

== See also ==
- List of American films of 1973
