= Return with Honor =

- Directed by: Freida Lee Mock; Terry Sanders
- Written by: Freida Lee Mock; Terry Sanders; Christine Z. Wiser
- Produced by: Freida Lee Mock; Terry Sanders; Christine Z. Wiser
- Narrated by: Tom Hanks
- Music by: Charles Bernstein
- Release date: June 11, 1999
- Running time: 101-103 minutes
- Country: United States
- Language: English

Return with Honor is a 1999 documentary film about U.S. prisoners of war during the Vietnam War. Among those profiled is Senator John McCain. It is narrated by Tom Hanks.

Directors Freida Lee Mock and Terry Sanders won the Best Film award at the 1999 Cleveland International Film Festival.

== Home media ==
It was released on VHS on June 13, 2000, and on DVD on April 24, 2001.
