= Academy Award for Best Documentary Short Film =

American award for documentary short films

- Country: United States
- Presented by: Academy of Motion Picture Arts and Sciences (AMPAS)
- First award: February 26, 1942; 84 years ago (for films released in 1941)
- Most recent winner: Joshua Seftel, Conall Jones; All the Empty Rooms (2025)
- Website: oscars.org

The Academy Award for Best Documentary Short Film is an award given annually by the Academy of Motion Picture Arts and Sciences (AMPAS) at the Academy Awards ceremony honoring the best documentary short film. The award was first presented at the 14th Academy Awards in 1942. Copies of every winning film (along with copies of most nominees) are held by the Academy Film Archive. Fifteen films are shortlisted before nominations are announced.

== Rules and eligibility ==
Per the recent rules of the Academy of Motion Picture Arts and Sciences (AMPAS), a Short Subject Documentary is defined as a nonfiction motion picture "dealing creatively with cultural, artistic, historical, social, scientific, economic or other subjects". It may be photographed in actual occurrence, or may employ partial reenactment, stock footage, stills, animation, stop-motion or other techniques, as long as the emphasis is on fact, and not on fiction. It must have a run time of no more than 40 minutes and released during a special eligibility period which may vary from year to year, but generally begins the month of October of the prior year and ends in September of the award year. (This eligibility differs from most other Academy Award categories which only includes films released between January and December of the award year.) The documentary's release must also occur within two years of the film's completion, and there are also rules governing the formatting of audio and video used to produce and exhibit the picture.

In addition, to be eligible the film must meet one of the following criteria:

- complete a commercial showing of at least 7 days in either Los Angeles County, California or anywhere in New York City before being released to other non-theatrical venues such as DVD or TV; or
- regardless of any public exhibition or nontheatrical release the film must have won a qualifying award at a competitive film festival, as specified by the Academy; or
- win a Gold, Silver or Bronze Medal award in the Documentary category of the Academy's Student Academy Award Competition.

The film must run daily for seven days, open to the public for paid admission, and must be advertised in one of the city's major circulars during its run, with screening times included. Additionally, the film must be shown at least once during every day of its qualifying run. Unlike the Best Documentary Feature award, whose rules mandate at least one screening starting between noon and 10 pm local time on each day of the qualifying run, there is no restriction on the start time of any screening. The film must have narration or dialogue primarily in English or with English subtitles, and must be the whole of an original work. Partial edits from larger works and episodes from serialized films are not eligible.

Eligibility rules for prior years may have differed from these.

=== Nomination process ===
The Documentary Branch of the Academy first votes to select ten pictures for preliminary nomination, after which a second round of balloting is conducted to select the five documentary nominees. The entire Academy membership will then vote for one of these five for the Oscar. A maximum of two people involved with the production of the documentary may be nominated for the award, one of whom must be the film's credited director. One producer may also be nominated, but if more than one non-director producer is credited the Academy Documentary Branch will vet the producers to select the one they believe was most involved in the creation of the film.

== Winners and nominees ==
=== 1940s ===
Year	Film	Nominees
1941 (14th)	Churchill's Island	National Film Board of Canada
1941 (14th)	Adventure in the Bronx	Film Associates
1941 (14th)	Bomber	United States Office for Emergency Management Film Unit
1941 (14th)	Christmas Under Fire	British Ministry of Information
1941 (14th)	Letter from Home	British Ministry of Information
1941 (14th)	Life of a Thoroughbred	Truman Talley
1941 (14th)	Norway in Revolt	The March of Time
1941 (14th)	A Place to Live	Philadelphia Housing Association
1941 (14th)	Russian Soil	Amkino
1941 (14th)	Soldiers of the Sky	Truman Talley
1941 (14th)	Warclouds in the Pacific	National Film Board of Canada
1942 (15th)
1942 (15th)	Short subject and feature documentaries competed in a combined Best Documentary category.	
1943 (16th) (Note: A preliminary list of 21 films were announced as nominees, but the Documentary Award Committee subsequently narrowed the field to 7 titles included on the final ballot. The 14 films that did not advance were: Bismarck Convoy Smashed (Australian Department of Information Film Unit), Day of Battle (United States Office of War Information Domestic Motion Picture Bureau), The Dutch Tradition (National Film Board of Canada), Kill or Be Killed (British Ministry of Information), The Labor Front (National Film Board of Canada), Land of My Mother (Polish Information Centre), Letter from Livingston (United States Army 4th Signal Photographic Unit), Life Line (United States Army Pictorial Service), The Rear Gunner (United States Department of War), Servant of a Nation (Union of South Africa), Task Force (United States Coast Guard), The Voice That Thrilled the World (Warner Bros.), Water, Friend or Enemy (Walt Disney), and Wings Up (United States Army Air Force 1st Motion Picture Unit).)
1943 (16th)	December 7th	United States Navy
1943 (16th)	Children of Mars	RKO Radio
1943 (16th)	Plan for Destruction	Metro-Goldwyn-Mayer
1943 (16th)	Swedes in America	United States Office of War Information Overseas Motion Picture Bureau
1943 (16th)	To the People of the United States	Walter Wanger
1943 (16th)	Tomorrow We Fly	United States Navy Bureau of Aeronautics
1943 (16th)	Youth in Crisis	The March of Time
1944 (17th)
1944 (17th)	With the Marines at Tarawa	United States Marine Corps
1944 (17th)	Hymn of the Nations	United States Office of War Information Overseas Motion Picture Bureau
1944 (17th)	New Americans	RKO Radio
1945 (18th)
1945 (18th)	Hitler Lives?	Gordon Hollingshead
1945 (18th)	Library of Congress	United States Office of War Information Overseas Motion Picture Bureau
1945 (18th)	To the Shores of Iwo Jima	United States Marine Corps
1946 (19th)
1946 (19th)	Seeds of Destiny	United States Department of War
1946 (19th)	Atomic Power	The March of Time
1946 (19th)	Life at the Zoo	Artkino
1946 (19th)	Paramount News Issue #37 (Twentieth Anniversary Issue! 1927.....1947)	Paramount
1946 (19th)	Traffic with the Devil	Herbert Morgan
1947 (20th)
1947 (20th)	First Steps	United Nations Division of Films and Visual Information
1947 (20th)	Passport to Nowhere	Frederic Ullman Jr.
1947 (20th)	School in the Mailbox	Australian News & Information Bureau
1948 (21st)
1948 (21st)	Toward Independence	United States Army
1948 (21st)	Heart to Heart	Herbert Morgan
1948 (21st)	Operation Vittles	United States Army Air Force
1949 (22nd)
1949 (22nd)	A Chance to Live (TIE)	Richard de Rochemont
1949 (22nd)	So Much for So Little (TIE)	Edward Selzer
1949 (22nd)	1848	French Cinema General Cooperative
1949 (22nd)	The Rising Tide	St. Francis-Xavier University, Antigonish, Nova Scotia

=== 1950s ===
Year	Film	Nominees
1950 (23rd)	Why Korea?	Edmund Reek
1950 (23rd)	The Fight: Science Against Cancer	Guy Glover
1950 (23rd)	The Stairs	Film Documents, Inc.
1951 (24th)
1951 (24th)	Benjy	Made by Fred Zinnemann with the cooperation of Paramount Pictures Corporation for the Los Angeles Orthopaedic Hospital (Note: A press release issued by the Academy of Motion Picture Arts and Sciences in 2005 stated that "Documentary Short Subject winners Benjy (1951) and Neighbours (1952) are among a group of films that not only competed, but won Academy Awards in what were clearly inappropriate categories. Benjy, directed by Fred Zinnemann and narrated by Henry Fonda, is the fictional tale of a crippled boy. The film was used as a fundraiser for the Los Angeles Orthopedic Hospital... Norman McLaren's Neighbours, which today would compete in the Animated Short category, used 'pixelation' – animation using living people – to create an allegory of war.")
1951 (24th)	One Who Came Back	Owen Crump (Film sponsored by the Disabled American Veterans, in cooperation with the United States Department of Defense and the Association of Motion Picture Producers)
1951 (24th)	The Seeing Eye	Gordon Hollingshead
1952 (25th)
1952 (25th)	Neighbours	Norman McLaren
1952 (25th)	Devil Take Us	Herbert Morgan
1952 (25th)	The Garden Spider (Epeira Diadema)	Alberto Ancilotto
1952 (25th)	Man Alive!	Stephen Bosustow
1953 (26th)
1953 (26th)	The Alaskan Eskimo	Walt Disney
1953 (26th)	The Living City	John Barnes
1953 (26th)	Operation Blue Jay	United States Army Signal Corps
1953 (26th)	They Planted a Stone	James Carr
1953 (26th)	The Word	John Healy and John Adams
1954 (27th)
1954 (27th)	Thursday's Children	World Wide Pictures and Morse Films
1954 (27th)	Jet Carrier	Otto Lang
1954 (27th)	Rembrandt: A Self-Portrait	Morrie Roizman
1955 (28th)
1955 (28th)	Men Against the Arctic	Walt Disney
1955 (28th)	The Battle of Gettysburg	Dore Schary
1955 (28th)	The Face of Lincoln	Wilbur T. Blume
1956 (29th)
1956 (29th)	The True Story of the Civil War	Louis Clyde Stoumen
1956 (29th)	A City Decides	Charles Guggenheim & Associates, Inc.
1956 (29th)	The Dark Wave	John Healy
1956 (29th)	The House Without a Name	Valentine Davies
1956 (29th)	Man in Space	Ward Kimball
1957 (30th)
1957 (30th)	No award given	
1958 (31st)
1958 (31st)	Ama Girls	Ben Sharpsteen
1958 (31st)	Employees Only	Kenneth G. Brown
1958 (31st)	Journey into Spring	Ian Ferguson
1958 (31st)	The Living Stone	Tom Daly
1958 (31st)	Overture	Thorold Dickinson
1959 (32nd)
1959 (32nd)	Glass	Bert Haanstra
1959 (32nd)	Donald in Mathmagic Land	Walt Disney
1959 (32nd)	From Generation to Generation	Edward F. Cullen

=== 1960s ===
Year	Film	Nominees
1960 (33rd)	Giuseppina	James Hill
1960 (33rd)	Beyond Silence	United States Information Agency
1960 (33rd)	A City Called Copenhagen	Statens Filmcentral and The Danish Government Film Office
1960 (33rd)	George Grosz' Interregnum	Charles Carey and Altina Carey
1960 (33rd)	Universe	Colin Low
1961 (34th)
1961 (34th)	Project Hope	Frank P. Bibas
1961 (34th)	Breaking the Language Barrier	United States Air Force
1961 (34th)	Cradle of Genius	Jim O'Connor and Tom Hayes
1961 (34th)	Kahl	Dido-Film-GmbH
1961 (34th)	L'Uomo in Grigio (The Man in Gray)	Benedetto Benedetti
1962 (35th)
1962 (35th)	Dylan Thomas	Jack Howells
1962 (35th)	The John Glenn Story	William L. Hendricks
1962 (35th)	The Road to the Wall	Robert Saudek
1963 (36th)
1963 (36th)	Chagall	Simon Schiffrin
1963 (36th)	The Five Cities of June	George Stevens Jr.
1963 (36th)	The Spirit of America	Algernon G. Walker
1963 (36th)	Thirty Million Letters	Edgar Anstey
1963 (36th)	To Live Again	Mel London
1964 (37th)
1964 (37th)	Nine from Little Rock	Charles Guggenheim
1964 (37th)	140 Days Under the World	Geoffrey Scott and Oxley Hughan
1964 (37th)	Breaking the Habit	Henry Jacobs and John Korty
1964 (37th)	Children Without	Charles Guggenheim
1964 (37th)	Kenojuak	National Film Board of Canada
1965 (38th)
1965 (38th)	To Be Alive!	Francis Thompson
1965 (38th)	Mural on Our Street	Kirk Smallman
1965 (38th)	Overture	Mafilm Productions
1965 (38th)	Point of View	Vision Associates Productions
1965 (38th)	Yeats Country	Patrick Carey and Joe Mendoza
1966 (39th)
1966 (39th)	A Year Toward Tomorrow	Edmond A. Levy
1966 (39th)	Adolescence	Marin Karmitz and Vladimir Forgency
1966 (39th)	Cowboy	Michael Ahnemann and Gary Schlosser
1966 (39th)	The Odds Against	Lee R. Bobker and Helen Kristt Radin
1966 (39th)	Saint Matthew Passion	Mafilm Studio
1967 (40th)
1967 (40th)	The Redwoods	Mark Jonathan Harris and Trevor Greenwood
1967 (40th)	Monument to the Dream	Charles Guggenheim
1967 (40th)	A Place to Stand	Christopher Chapman
1967 (40th)	See You at the Pillar	Robert Fitchett
1967 (40th)	While I Run This Race	Carl V. Ragsdale
1968 (41st)
1968 (41st)	Why Man Creates	Saul Bass
1968 (41st)	The House That Ananda Built	Fali Bilimoria
1968 (41st)	The Revolving Door	Lee R. Bobker
1968 (41st)	A Space to Grow	Thomas P. Kelly Jr.
1968 (41st)	A Way Out of the Wilderness	Dan E. Weisburd
1969 (42nd)
1969 (42nd)	Czechoslovakia 1968	Denis Sanders and Robert M. Fresco
1969 (42nd)	An Impression of John Steinbeck: Writer	Donald Wrye
1969 (42nd)	Jenny Is a Good Thing	Joan Horvath
1969 (42nd)	Leo Beuerman	Arthur H. Wolf and Russell A. Mosser
1969 (42nd)	The Magic Machines	Joan Keller Stern

=== 1970s ===
Year	Film	Nominees
1970 (43rd)	Interviews with My Lai Veterans	Joseph Strick
1970 (43rd)	The Gifts	Robert McBride
1970 (43rd)	A Long Way from Nowhere	Bob Aller
1970 (43rd)	Oisin	Patrick Carey and Vivien Carey
1970 (43rd)	Time Is Running Out	Horst Dallmayr and Robert Menegoz
1971 (44th)
1971 (44th)	Sentinels of Silence	Manuel Arango and Robert Amram
1971 (44th)	Adventures in Perception	Han van Gelder
1971 (44th)	Art Is...	Julian Krainin and DeWitt L. Sage Jr.
1971 (44th)	The Numbers Start with the River	Donald Wrye
1971 (44th)	Somebody Waiting	Hal Riney, Dick Snider and Sherwood Omens
1972 (45th)
1972 (45th)	This Tiny World	Charles and Martina Huguenot van der Linden
1972 (45th)	Hundertwasser's Rainy Day	Peter Schamoni
1972 (45th)	K-Z	Giorgio Treves
1972 (45th)	Selling Out	Tadeusz Jaworski
1972 (45th)	The Tide of Traffic	Humphrey Swingler
1973 (46th)
1973 (46th)	Princeton: A Search for Answers	Julian Krainin and DeWitt Sage
1973 (46th)	Background	Carmen D'Avino
1973 (46th)	Children at Work (Paisti Ag Obair)	Louis Marcus
1973 (46th)	Christo's Valley Curtain	Albert Maysles and David Maysles
1973 (46th)	Four Stones for Kanemitsu	Terry Sanders and June Wayne
1974 (47th)
1974 (47th)	Don't	Robin Lehman
1974 (47th)	City Out of Wilderness	Francis Thompson
1974 (47th)	Exploratorium	Jon Boorstin
1974 (47th)	John Muir's High Sierra	Dewitt Jones and Lesley Foster
1974 (47th)	Naked Yoga	Ronald S. Kass and Mervyn Lloyd
1975 (48th)
1975 (48th)	The End of the Game	Claire Wilbur and Robin Lehman
1975 (48th)	Arthur and Lillie	Jon Else, Steven Kovacs and Kristine Samuelson
1975 (48th)	Millions of Years Ahead of Man	Manfred Baier
1975 (48th)	Probes in Space	George V. Casey
1975 (48th)	Whistling Smith	Barrie Howells and Michael Scott
1976 (49th)
1976 (49th)	Number Our Days	Lynne Littman and Barbara Myerhoff
1976 (49th)	American Shoeshine	Sparky Greene
1976 (49th)	Blackwood	Tony Ianzelo and Andy Thomson
1976 (49th)	The End of the Road	John Armstrong
1976 (49th)	Universe	Lester Novros
1977 (50th)
1977 (50th)	Gravity Is My Enemy	John C. Joseph and Jan Stussy
1977 (50th)	Agueda Martinez: Our People, Our Country	Moctesuma Esparza
1977 (50th)	First Edition	Helen Whitney and DeWitt L. Sage Jr.
1977 (50th)	Of Time, Tombs and Treasures	James R. Messenger and Paul N. Raimondi
1977 (50th)	The Shetland Experience	Douglas Gordon
1978 (51st)
1978 (51st)	The Flight of the Gossamer Condor	Jacqueline Phillips Shedd and Ben Shedd
1978 (51st)	The Divided Trail: A Native American Odyssey	Jerry Aronson
1978 (51st)	An Encounter with Faces	K.K. Kapil
1978 (51st)	Goodnight Miss Ann	August Cinquegrana
1978 (51st)	Squires of San Quentin	J. Gary Mitchell
1979 (52nd)
1979 (52nd)	Paul Robeson: Tribute to an Artist	Saul J. Turell
1979 (52nd)	Dae	Risto Teofilovski
1979 (52nd)	Koryo Celadon	Donald A. Connolly and James R. Messenger
1979 (52nd)	Nails	Phillip Borsos
1979 (52nd)	Remember Me	Dick Young

=== 1980s ===
Year	Film	Nominees
1980 (53rd)	Karl Hess: Toward Liberty	Roland Hallé and Peter Ladue
1980 (53rd)	Don't Mess with Bill	John Watson and Pen Densham
1980 (53rd)	The Eruption of Mount St. Helens	George Casey
1980 (53rd)	It's the Same World	Dick Young
1980 (53rd)	Luther Metke at 94	Richard Hawkins and Jorge Preloran
1981 (54th)
1981 (54th)	Close Harmony	Nigel Noble
1981 (54th)	Americas in Transition	Obie Benz
1981 (54th)	Journey for Survival	Dick Young
1981 (54th)	See What I Say	Linda Chapman, Pam LeBlanc and Freddi Stevens
1981 (54th)	Urge to Build	Roland Hallé and John Hoover
1982 (55th)
1982 (55th)	If You Love This Planet	Edward Le Lorrain and Terre Nash
1982 (55th)	Gods of Metal	Robert Richter
1982 (55th)	The Klan: A Legacy of Hate in America	Charles Guggenheim and Werner Schumann
1982 (55th)	To Live or Let Die	Freida Lee Mock
1982 (55th)	Traveling Hopefully	John G. Avildsen
1983 (56th)
1983 (56th)	Flamenco at 5:15	Cynthia Scott and Adam Symansky
1983 (56th)	In the Nuclear Shadow: What Can the Children Tell Us?	Vivienne Verdon-Roe and Eric Thiermann
1983 (56th)	Sewing Woman	Arthur Dong
1983 (56th)	Spaces: The Architecture of Paul Rudolph	Robert Eisenhardt
1983 (56th)	You Are Free (Ihr Zent Frei)	Dea Brokman and Ilene Landis
1984 (57th)
1984 (57th)	The Stone Carvers	Marjorie Hunt and Paul Wagner
1984 (57th)	The Children of Soong Ching Ling	Gary Bush and Paul T.K. Lin
1984 (57th)	Code Gray: Ethical Dilemmas in Nursing	Ben Achtenberg and Joan Sawyer
1984 (57th)	The Garden of Eden	Lawrence R. Hott and Roger M. Sherman
1984 (57th)	Recollections of Pavlovsk	Irina Kalinina
1985 (58th)
1985 (58th)	Witness to War: Dr. Charlie Clements	David Goodman
1985 (58th)	The Courage to Care	Robert Gardner
1985 (58th)	Keats and His Nightingale: A Blind Date	Michael Crowley and James Wolpaw
1985 (58th)	Making Overtures: The Story of a Community Orchestra	Barbara Willis Sweete
1985 (58th)	The Wizard of the Strings	Alan Edelstein
1986 (59th)
1986 (59th)	Women – for America, for the World	Vivienne Verdon-Roe
1986 (59th)	Debonair Dancers	Alison Nigh-Strelich
1986 (59th)	The Masters of Disaster	Sonya Friedman
1986 (59th)	Red Grooms: Sunflower in a Hothouse	Thomas L. Neff and Madeline Bell
1986 (59th)	Sam	Aaron D. Weisblatt
1987 (60th)
1987 (60th)	Young at Heart	Sue Marx and Pamela Conn
1987 (60th)	Frances Steloff: Memoirs of a Bookseller	Deborah Dickson
1987 (60th)	In the Wee Wee Hours...	Dr. Frank Daniel and Izak Ben-Meir
1987 (60th)	Language Says It All	Megan Williams
1987 (60th)	Silver into Gold	Lynn Mueller
1988 (61st)
1988 (61st)	You Don't Have to Die	Malcolm Clarke and Bill Guttentag
1988 (61st)	The Children's Storefront	Karen Goodman
1988 (61st)	Family Gathering	Lise Yasui and Ann Tegnell
1988 (61st)	Gang Cops	Thomas B. Fleming and Daniel J. Marks
1988 (61st)	Portrait of Imogen	Nancy Hale and Meg Partridge
1989 (62nd)
1989 (62nd)	The Johnstown Flood	Charles Guggenheim
1989 (62nd)	Fine Food, Fine Pastries, Open 6 to 9	David Petersen
1989 (62nd)	Yad Vashem: Preserving the Past to Ensure the Future	Ray Errol Fox

=== 1990s ===
Year	Film	Nominees
1990 (63rd)	Days of Waiting	Steven Okazaki
1990 (63rd)	Burning Down Tomorrow	Kit Thomas
1990 (63rd)	Chimps: So Like Us	Karen Goodman and Kirk Simon
1990 (63rd)	Journey Into Life: The World of the Unborn	Derek Bromhall
1990 (63rd)	Rose Kennedy: A Life to Remember	Freida Lee Mock and Terry Sanders
1991 (64th)
1991 (64th)	Deadly Deception: General Electric, Nuclear Weapons and Our Environment	Debra Chasnoff
1991 (64th)	Birdnesters of Thailand (Shadow Hunters)	Éric Valli and Alain Majani
1991 (64th)	A Little Vicious	Immy Humes
1991 (64th)	The Mark of the Maker	David McGowan
1991 (64th)	Memorial: Letters from American Soldiers	Bill Couturié and Bernard Edelman
1992 (65th)
1992 (65th)	Educating Peter	Thomas C. Goodwin (posthumously) and Gerardine Wurzburg
1992 (65th)	At the Edge of Conquest: The Journey of Chief Wai-Wai	Geoffrey O'Connor
1992 (65th)	Beyond Imagining: Margaret Anderson and the 'Little Review'	Wendy L. Weinberg
1992 (65th)	The Colours of My Father: A Portrait of Sam Borenstein	Richard Elson and Sally Bochner
1992 (65th)	When Abortion Was Illegal: Untold Stories	Dorothy Fadiman
1993 (66th)
1993 (66th)	Defending Our Lives	Margaret Lazarus and Renner Wunderlich
1993 (66th)	Blood Ties: The Life and Work of Sally Mann	Steven Cantor and Peter Spirer
1993 (66th)	Chicks in White Satin	Elaine Holliman and Jason Schneider
1994 (67th)
1994 (67th)	A Time for Justice	Charles Guggenheim
1994 (67th)	Blues Highway	Vince DiPersio and Bill Guttentag
1994 (67th)	89 mm od Europy (89mm from Europe)	Marcel Łoziński
1994 (67th)	School of Assassins	Robert Richter
1994 (67th)	Straight from the Heart	Dee Mosbacher and Frances Reid
1995 (68th)
1995 (68th)	One Survivor Remembers	Kary Antholis
1995 (68th)	Jim Dine: A Self-Portrait on the Walls	Nancy Dine and Richard Stilwell
1995 (68th)	The Living Sea	Greg MacGillivray and Alec Lorimore
1995 (68th)	Never Give Up: The 20th Century Odyssey of Herbert Zipper	Terry Sanders and Freida Lee Mock
1995 (68th)	The Shadow of Hate	Charles Guggenheim
1996 (69th)
1996 (69th)	Breathing Lessons: The Life and Work of Mark O'Brien	Jessica Yu
1996 (69th)	Cosmic Voyage	Jeffrey Marvin and Bayley Silleck
1996 (69th)	An Essay on Matisse	Perry Wolff
1996 (69th)	Special Effects: Anything Can Happen	Susanne Simpson and Ben Burtt
1996 (69th)	The Wild Bunch: An Album in Montage	Paul Seydor and Nick Redman
1997 (70th)
1997 (70th)	A Story of Healing	Donna Dewey and Carol Pasternak
1997 (70th)	Alaska: Spirit of the Wild	George Casey and Paul Novros
1997 (70th)	Amazon	Kieth Merrill and Jonathan Stern
1997 (70th)	Daughter of the Bride	Terri Randall
1997 (70th)	Still Kicking: The Fabulous Palm Springs Follies	Mel Damski and Andrea Blaugrund
1998 (71st)
1998 (71st)	The Personals: Improvisations on Romance in the Golden Years	Keiko Ibi
1998 (71st)	A Place in the Land	Charles Guggenheim
1998 (71st)	Sunrise Over Tiananmen Square	Shui-Bo Wang and Donald McWilliams
1999 (72nd)
1999 (72nd)	King Gimp	Susan Hannah Hadary and William A. Whiteford
1999 (72nd)	Eyewitness	Bert Van Bork
1999 (72nd)	The Wildest Show in the South: The Angola Prison Rodeo	Simeon Soffer and Jonathan Stack

=== 2000s ===
Year	Film	Nominees
2000 (73rd)	Big Mama	Tracy Seretean
2000 (73rd)	Curtain Call	Chuck Braverman and Steve Kalafer
2000 (73rd)	Dolphins	Greg MacGillivray and Alec Lorimore
2000 (73rd)	The Man on Lincoln's Nose	Daniel Raim
2000 (73rd)	On Tiptoe: Gentle Steps to Freedom	Eric Simonson and Leelai Demoz
2001 (74th)
2001 (74th)	Thoth	Sarah Kernochan and Lynn Appelle
2001 (74th)	Artists and Orphans: A True Drama	Lianne Klapper McNally
2001 (74th)	Sing!	Freida Lee Mock and Jessica Sanders
2002 (75th)
2002 (75th)	Twin Towers	Bill Guttentag and Robert David Port
2002 (75th)	The Collector of Bedford Street	Alice Elliott
2002 (75th)	Mighty Times: The Legacy of Rosa Parks	Robert Hudson and Bobby Houston
2002 (75th)	Why Can't We Be a Family Again?	Roger Weisberg and Murray Nossel
2003 (76th)
2003 (76th)	Chernobyl Heart	Maryann DeLeo
2003 (76th)	Asylum	Sandy McLeod and Gini Reticker
2003 (76th)	Ferry Tales	Katja Esson
2004 (77th)
2004 (77th)	Mighty Times: The Children's March	Robert Hudson and Robert Houston
2004 (77th)	Autism Is a World	Gerardine Wurzburg
2004 (77th)	The Children of Leningradsky	Hanna Polak and Andrzej Celinski
2004 (77th)	Hardwood	Hubert Davis and Erin Faith Young
2004 (77th)	Sister Rose's Passion	Oren Jacoby and Steve Kalafer
2005 (78th)
2005 (78th)	A Note of Triumph: The Golden Age of Norman Corwin	Corinne Marrinan and Eric Simonson
2005 (78th)	The Death of Kevin Carter: Casualty of the Bang Bang Club	Dan Krauss
2005 (78th)	God Sleeps in Rwanda	Kimberlee Acquaro and Stacy Sherman
2005 (78th)	The Mushroom Club	Steven Okazaki
2006 (79th)
2006 (79th)	The Blood of Yingzhou District	Ruby Yang and Thomas Lennon
2006 (79th)	Recycled Life	Leslie Iwerks and Mike Glad
2006 (79th)	Rehearsing a Dream	Karen Goodman and Kirk Simon
2006 (79th)	Two Hands	Nathaniel Kahn and Susan Rose Behr
2007 (80th)
2007 (80th)	Freeheld	Cynthia Wade and Vanessa Roth
2007 (80th)	La Corona (The Crown)	Amanda Micheli and Isabel Vega
2007 (80th)	Salim Baba	Tim Sternberg and Francisco Bello
2007 (80th)	Sari's Mother	James Longley
2008 (81st)
2008 (81st)	Smile Pinki	Megan Mylan
2008 (81st)	The Conscience of Nhem En	Steven Okazaki
2008 (81st)	The Final Inch	Irene Taylor Brodsky and Tom Grant
2008 (81st)	The Witness: From the Balcony of Room 306	Adam Pertofsky and Margaret Hyde
2009 (82nd)
2009 (82nd)	Music by Prudence	Roger Ross Williams and Elinor Burkett
2009 (82nd)	China's Unnatural Disaster: The Tears of Sichuan Province	Jon Alpert and Matthew O'Neill
2009 (82nd)	The Last Campaign of Governor Booth Gardner	Daniel Junge and Henry Ansbacher
2009 (82nd)	The Last Truck: Closing of a GM Plant	Steven Bognar and Julia Reichert
2009 (82nd)	Rabbit à la Berlin	Bartek Konopka and Anna Wydra

=== 2010s ===
Year	Film	Nominees
2010 (83rd)	Strangers No More	Karen Goodman and Kirk Simon
2010 (83rd)	Killing in the Name	Jed Rothstein
2010 (83rd)	Poster Girl	Sara Nesson and Mitchell Block
2010 (83rd)	Sun Come Up	Jennifer Redfearn and Tim Metzger
2010 (83rd)	The Warriors of Qiugang	Ruby Yang and Thomas Lennon
2011 (84th)
2011 (84th)	Saving Face	Daniel Junge and Sharmeen Obaid-Chinoy
2011 (84th)	The Barber of Birmingham: Foot Soldier of the Civil Rights Movement	Robin Fryday and Gail Dolgin
2011 (84th)	God Is the Bigger Elvis	Rebecca Cammisa and Julie Anderson
2011 (84th)	Incident in New Baghdad	James Spione
2011 (84th)	The Tsunami and the Cherry Blossom	Lucy Walker and Kira Carstensen
2012 (85th)
2012 (85th)	Inocente	Sean Fine and Andrea Nix Fine
2012 (85th)	Kings Point	Sari Gilman and Jedd Wider
2012 (85th)	Mondays at Racine	Cynthia Wade and Robin Honan
2012 (85th)	Open Heart	Kief Davidson and Cori Shepherd Stern
2012 (85th)	Redemption	Jon Alpert and Matthew O'Neill
2013 (86th)
2013 (86th)	The Lady in Number 6: Music Saved My Life	Malcolm Clarke and Nicholas Reed
2013 (86th)	CaveDigger	Jeffrey Karoff
2013 (86th)	Facing Fear	Jason Cohen
2013 (86th)	Karama Has No Walls	Sara Ishaq
2013 (86th)	Prison Terminal: The Last Days of Private Jack Hall	Edgar Barens
2014 (87th)
2014 (87th)	Crisis Hotline: Veterans Press 1	Ellen Goosenberg Kent and Dana Perry
2014 (87th)	Joanna	Aneta Kopacz
2014 (87th)	Our Curse	Tomasz Śliwiński and Maciej Ślesicki
2014 (87th)	The Reaper (La Parka)	Gabriel Serra Arguello
2014 (87th)	White Earth	J. Christian Jensen
2015 (88th)
2015 (88th)	A Girl in the River: The Price of Forgiveness	Sharmeen Obaid-Chinoy
2015 (88th)	Body Team 12	David Darg and Bryn Mooser
2015 (88th)	Chau, Beyond the Lines	Courtney Marsh and Jerry Franck
2015 (88th)	Claude Lanzmann: Spectres of the Shoah	Adam Benzine
2015 (88th)	Last Day of Freedom	Dee Hibbert-Jones and Nomi Talisman
2016 (89th)
2016 (89th)	The White Helmets	Orlando von Einsiedel and Joanna Natasegara
2016 (89th)	Extremis	Dan Krauss
2016 (89th)	4.1 Miles	Daphne Matziaraki
2016 (89th)	Joe's Violin	Kahane Cooperman and Raphaela Neihausen
2016 (89th)	Watani: My Homeland	Marcel Mettelsiefen and Stephen Ellis
2017 (90th)
2017 (90th)	Heaven Is a Traffic Jam on the 405	Frank Stiefel
2017 (90th)	Edith+Eddie	Laura Checkoway and Thomas Lee Wright
2017 (90th)	Heroin(e)	Elaine McMillion Sheldon and Kerrin Sheldon
2017 (90th)	Knife Skills	Thomas Lennon
2017 (90th)	Traffic Stop	Kate Davis and David Heilbroner
2018 (91st)
2018 (91st)	Period. End of Sentence.	Rayka Zehtabchi and Melissa Berton
2018 (91st)	Black Sheep	Ed Perkins and Jonathan Chinn
2018 (91st)	End Game	Rob Epstein and Jeffrey Friedman
2018 (91st)	Lifeboat	Skye Fitzgerald and Bryn Mooser
2018 (91st)	A Night at the Garden	Marshall Curry
2019 (92nd)
2019 (92nd)	Learning to Skateboard in a Warzone (If You're a Girl)	Carol Dysinger and Elena Andreicheva
2019 (92nd)	In the Absence	Yi Seung-Jun and Gary Byung-Seok Kam
2019 (92nd)	Life Overtakes Me	John Haptas and Kristine Samuelson
2019 (92nd)	St. Louis Superman	Smriti Mundhra and Sami Khan
2019 (92nd)	Walk Run Cha-Cha	Laura Nix and Colette Sandstedt

=== 2020s ===
Year	Film	Nominees
2020/21 (93rd)	Colette	Anthony Giacchino and Alice Doyard
2020/21 (93rd)	A Concerto Is a Conversation	Ben Proudfoot and Kris Bowers
2020/21 (93rd)	Do Not Split	Anders Hammer and Charlotte Cook
2020/21 (93rd)	Hunger Ward	Skye Fitzgerald and Michael Scheuerman
2020/21 (93rd)	A Love Song for Latasha	Sophia Nahli Allison and Janice Duncan
2021 (94th)
2021 (94th)	The Queen of Basketball	Ben Proudfoot
2021 (94th)	Audible	Matthew Ogens and Geoff McLean
2021 (94th)	Lead Me Home	Pedro Kos and Jon Shenk
2021 (94th)	Three Songs for Benazir	Elizabeth Mirzaei and Gulistan Mirzaei
2021 (94th)	When We Were Bullies	Jay Rosenblatt
2022 (95th)
2022 (95th)	The Elephant Whisperers	Kartiki Gonsalves and Guneet Monga
2022 (95th)	Haulout	Evgenia Arbugaeva and Maxim Arbugaev
2022 (95th)	How Do You Measure a Year?	Jay Rosenblatt
2022 (95th)	The Martha Mitchell Effect	Anne Alvergue and Beth Levison
2022 (95th)	Stranger at the Gate	Joshua Seftel and Conall Jones
2023 (96th)
2023 (96th)	The Last Repair Shop	Ben Proudfoot and Kris Bowers
2023 (96th)	The ABCs of Book Banning	Sheila Nevins and Trish Adlesic
2023 (96th)	The Barber of Little Rock	John Hoffman and Christine Turner
2023 (96th)	Island in Between	S. Leo Chiang and Jean Tsien
2023 (96th)	Nǎi Nai & Wài Pó	Sean Wang and Sam Davis
2024 (97th)
2024 (97th)	The Only Girl in the Orchestra	Molly O'Brien and Lisa Remington
2024 (97th)	Death by Numbers	Kim A. Snyder and Janique L. Robillard
2024 (97th)	I Am Ready, Warden	Smriti Mundhra and Maya Gnyp
2024 (97th)	Incident	Bill Morrison and Jamie Kalven
2024 (97th)	Instruments of a Beating Heart	Ema Ryan Yamazaki and Eric Nyari
2025 (98th)
2025 (98th)	All the Empty Rooms	Joshua Seftel and Conall Jones
2025 (98th)	Armed Only with a Camera: The Life and Death of Brent Renaud	Craig Renaud and Juan Arredondo
2025 (98th)	Children No More: "Were and Are Gone"	Hilla Medalia and Sheila Nevins
2025 (98th)	The Devil Is Busy	Christalyn Hampton and Geeta Gandbhir
2025 (98th)	Perfectly a Strangeness	Alison McAlpine

== Multiple wins ==
=== Individuals with multiple wins ===
3 wins

- Charles Guggenheim

2 wins

- Malcolm Clarke
- Walt Disney
- Bill Guttentag
- Robin Lehman
- Sharmeen Obaid-Chinoy
- Ben Proudfoot

=== Studios with multiple wins ===
4 wins

- National Film Board of Canada

3 wins

- Walt Disney Productions

2 wins

- Breakwater Studios

== Individuals with multiple nominations ==
9 nominations

- Charles Guggenheim

4 nominations

- Karen Goodman
- Freida Lee Mock

3 nominations

- George Casey
- Walt Disney
- Bill Guttentag
- Thomas Lennon
- The March of Time
- Herbert Morgan
- National Film Board of Canada
- Steven Okazaki
- Ben Proudfoot
- DeWitt L. Sage Jr.
- Terry Sanders
- Kirk Simon
- United States Office of War Information Overseas Motion Picture Bureau
- Dick Young

2 nominations

- Jon Alpert
- Lee R. Bobker
- Kris Bowers
- British Ministry of Information
- Patrick Carey
- Malcolm Clarke
- Skye Fitzgerald
- Roland Hallé
- John Healy
- Gordon Hollingshead
- Bobby Houston
- Conall Jones
- Daniel Junge
- Steve Kalafer
- Julian Krainin
- Dan Krauss
- Robin Lehman
- Alec Lorimore
- James R. Messenger
- Greg MacGillivray
- Mafilm Studio
- Sheila Nevins
- Matthew O'Neill
- Sharmeen Obaid-Chinoy
- Robert Richter
- RKO Radio
- Jay Rosenblatt
- Joshua Seftel
- Eric Simonson
- Truman Talley
- Francis Thompson
- United States Marine Corps
- Vivienne Verdon-Roe
- Cynthia Wade
- Donald Wrye
- Gerardine Wurzburg
- Ruby Yang

== See also ==
- Submissions for Best Documentary Short Academy Award
- List of Academy Award–nominated films
