= To Live or Let Die =

1982 film

- Directed by: Terry Sanders
- Produced by: Freida Lee Mock
- Production company: American Film Foundation
- Distributed by: Perennial Education
- Release date: 1982
- Country: United States
- Language: English

To Live or Let Die is a 1982 American short documentary film directed by Terry Sanders. It was nominated for an Academy Award for Best Documentary Short.
