= Never Give Up: The 20th Century Odyssey of Herbert Zipper =

1995 film

- Directed by: Terry Sanders
- Written by: Terry Sanders
- Produced by: Freida Lee Mock; Terry Sanders
- Starring: Herbert Zipper
- Production company: American Film Foundation
- Release date: 1995
- Running time: 40 minutes
- Countries: United States; Canada
- Language: English

Never Give Up: The 20th Century Odyssey of Herbert Zipper is a 1995 short documentary film about conductor and music educator Herbert Zipper. It was written, directed, and produced by Terry Sanders, with Freida Lee Mock co-producing. It was nominated for an Academy Award for Best Documentary Short at the 68th Academy Awards in 1996.
