= Screenwriters: Words Into Image =

- Genre: Documentary
- Directed by: Terry Sanders; Freida Lee Mock
- Starring: Carl Foreman; William Goldman; Paul Mazursky; Eleanor Perry; Neil Simon; Robert Towne
- Country of origin: United States
- Original language: English

Production
- Running time: 30 minutes

Original release
- Network: PBS
- Release: 1982

Screenwriters: Words Into Image (1982) is a PBS documentary series produced in the United States and featuring six 30-minute episodes. Each explored the work of a single significant American screenwriter. The series was directed by Terry Sanders and Freida Lee Mock. Individual episodes featured Carl Foreman, who was blacklisted in the 1950s after being classified as an uncooperative witness by the House Unamerican Activities Committee and worked for years in Great Britain; William Goldman, Paul Mazursky, Eleanor Perry, Neil Simon, and Robert Towne.

The series was nominated for the Primetime Emmy Award for Outstanding Informational Series in 1983.
