= Maya Lin: A Strong Clear Vision =

- Directed by: Freida Lee Mock
- Written by: Freida Lee Mock
- Produced by: Freida Lee Mock; Terry Sanders
- Cinematography: Don Lenzer; Ed Marrick
- Music by: Charles Bernstein
- Production company: American Film Foundation
- Distributed by: Ocean Releasing
- Release date: October 1994
- Running time: 105 minutes
- Country: United States
- Language: English
- Box office: $62,186

Maya Lin: A Strong Clear Vision is a 1994 American documentary film made by Freida Lee Mock. It explores the life of American artist Maya Lin, whose best-known work is the Vietnam Veterans Memorial in Washington, D.C. The film won the 1994 Academy Award for Best Documentary Feature. While a number of movie critics objected to it receiving this award, Maya Lin: A Strong Clear Vision met with mostly positive reviews, garnering praise for its look at the controversy surrounding the Vietnam Veterans Memorial design and Lin's growth as an artist.

In 2023, the film was selected for preservation in the United States National Film Registry by the Library of Congress as being "culturally, historically, or aesthetically significant".

== Reception and legacy ==
=== Accolades ===
The film won the 1994 Academy Award for Best Documentary Feature. It later aired on the PBS series POV.

The award was mired in controversy as acclaimed films such as Hoop Dreams failed to receive a nomination. Film critic Roger Ebert also suggested that the nomination of Maya Lin stemmed from cronyism, since Mock was the chair of the committee which makes the nominations (though she stepped aside for the year that Maya Lin was under consideration), and was thus close friends with many of the committee members. Mock denied that the nomination in any way stemmed from cronyism and hired an attorney to respond to the press criticism. Ebert and his associate Gene Siskel publicly apologized to Mock after seeing Maya Lin, with Ebert saying "I think it's a good film and deserved to be nominated.", but other prominent critics such as Janet Maslin maintained that while Maya Lin was a good film it was clearly outshone by documentaries such as Hoop Dreams and Crumb which were passed up for nomination.

In 2023, the film was selected for preservation in the United States National Film Registry by the Library of Congress as being "culturally, historically, or aesthetically significant".

=== Reviews ===
Roger Ebert, despite his earlier outrage over Maya Lin: A Strong Clear Vision being nominated for an Academy Award, admitted in his review for the film that "It was not the best documentary of the year, but it is a valuable document. If you have been to the Vietnam Veterans Memorial, you will want to see it. If you have not, it will make you want to go." He applauded the scenes showing Maya Lin's struggle against opponents of her design for the Vietnam Veterans Memorial as "arresting" and "illuminating", though he criticized the film for not exploring Lin's private life. He gave it three out of four stars. Writing in The Austin Chronicle, Alison Macor agreed with Ebert that the Academy Award controversy "may have obscured what is a powerful, inspiring account of a supremely talented woman's professional transformation from a 20-year-old undergraduate architectural student at Yale to an accomplished and renowned architect and sculptor." Particularly praising Maya Lin's recount of her mixed feelings over winning the memorial design competition and the resulting controversy, and the way the film shows insight into Lin's design philosophy, she gave Maya Lin: A Strong Clear Vision three-and-a-half out of five stars.
