= Family Gathering =

1988 film

- Directed by: Lise Yasui
- Distributed by: New Day Films
- Release date: March 5, 1988
- Running time: 30 minutes
- Country: United States
- Language: English

Family Gathering is a 1988 American short documentary film by Lise Yasui, exploring three generations of her Japanese-American family, from their immigration to Oregon in the early 20th century through their imprisonment in internment camps during World War II. It was nominated for an Academy Award for Best Documentary Short.

== Cast ==
- Keith Hamilton Cobb as Felix (flashback sequence) (uncredited)
