= Sing! (2001 film) =

2001 film

- Directed by: Freida Lee Mock
- Produced by: Freida Lee Mock; Jessica Sanders
- Starring: Los Angeles Children's Chorus
- Production companies: KCET; American Film Foundation
- Distributed by: KCET
- Release date: 2001
- Running time: 36 minutes
- Country: United States
- Language: English

Sing! is a 2001 American short documentary film about the Los Angeles Children's Chorus, directed by Freida Lee Mock. It was nominated for an Academy Award for Best Documentary Short.

== Awards and nominations ==
Incomplete list of awards for Sing!
Year	Award	Category	Result
2001	74th Academy Awards	Best Documentary Short Subject	Nominated

== See also ==
- List of documentary films
- List of American films of 2001
