= Manila Symphony Orchestra =

Orchestra in Asia

- Orchestra
- Founded: 1926
- Principal conductor: Marlon Chen
- Website: www.manilasymphony.com

The Manila Symphony Orchestra (MSO) is one of the oldest orchestras in Asia. Founded by Alexander Lippay in 1926, the orchestra has played a major role in Philippine history, including acting as a symbol of resistance during the Second World War. Through the years, MSO has hosted artists Montserrat Caballé, Yehudi Menuhin, Igor Oistrakh, Eugene Istomin, Fou Ts'ong, Barry Tuckwell, Paul Badura-Skoda and Rony Rogoff, as well as conductors Andre Kostelanetz, Arthur Fiedler, Mendi Rodan, Robert Feist, Gareth Nair, Helen Quach, and Eduard Strauss II. Today, the Manila Symphony Orchestra provides a showcase for young Filipino musical talent.

== Origins ==
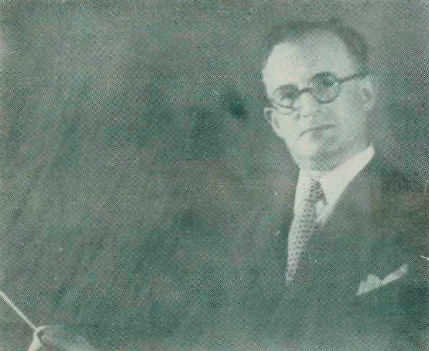
Alexander Lippay

The Manila Symphony Orchestra was founded by Alexander Lippay, and held its first concert on 22 January 1926 at the Manila Grand Opera House. They also played at the inauguration concert of the Metropolitan Theater on 10 December 1931. During this time the orchestra was plagued with financial difficulties. The introduction of the Popular Sunday Concerts in 1935 (with tickets as low as 30 centavos) proved to be a large success and greatly helped the orchestra financially. It proved so popular that it once filled the Metropolitan Theater during a signal no. 4 typhoon. Notable people such as President Manuel Quezon and his wife were avid supporters of the orchestra. Alexander Lippay suddenly died on 3 May 1939, and was replaced by Herbert Zipper as conductor the same year. Zipper was once a prisoner at Dachau then the Buchenwald concentration camp before getting liberated and journeyed to the Philippines in 1939.

Zipper expanded the activities of the orchestra and formed the Manila Concert Chorus. Under his direction Beethoven's 9th Symphony was first performed in the country in 1940. The orchestra traveled to Baguio to host a music festival in 1940 and 1941.

== War and post-war ==
During the Japanese occupation of the Philippines in 1942, Zipper was briefly detained by the Japanese as a "political prisoner" and the Manila Symphony Orchestra refused to perform as a protest and hid their instruments. In retaliation, the Japanese formed the New Philippines Symphony Orchestra under the baton of Francisco Santiago. Following the liberation of the Philippines in 1945, the Manila Symphony Orchestra was reformed by Herbert Zipper. Its first post-liberation concert was held in the ruins of Santa Cruz Church on May 9, 1945. Filipino musicians performed for the combined American and Filipino soldiers at the post-liberation army camps. Some of the musicians also toured the provinces and held special shows in hospital wards.

== Young musicians ==
MSO has instituted two main programs intended to develop Filipino musical artistry and showcase Filipino musical talent, the "Young Artists' Competitions" and the Luneta Concerts (known as "Concert in the Park"). The Manila Symphony Orchestra today has young musicians who are trained by the Philippine Research for Developing International Soloists (PREDIS), which was founded in 1985 by Basilio Manalo and Sister Mary Placid Abejo at St. Scholastica's College. Filipino conductors have also taken the helm of the MSO, including Francisco Santiago, Basilio Manalo, and later Arturo Molina.

At present the MSO is composed of around 60 musicians under the music direction of Marlon Chen. Many members the orchestra are young music students who are also enrolled in the different colleges and conservatories of music in the Metro Manila area. Many of these have been winners in the National Music Competitions for Young Artists (NAMCYA) and have represented the Philippines in international music festivals and workshops.

== Awards ==
In July 2024, MSO under conductor, Jeffrey Solares, bagged the Gold Prize and Grand Prix at the 13th Bratislava International Youth Music Festival in Slovakia.

== Notable members ==
- Herbert Zipper
