= Herbert Zipper =

Composer, conductor, and arts activist

Herbert Zipper (April 27, 1904 in Vienna, Austria – April 21, 1997 in Santa Monica, California) was a composer, conductor, and arts activist. As an inmate at Dachau concentration camp in the late 1930s, he arranged to have crude musical instruments constructed out of stolen material, and formed a small secret orchestra which performed on Sunday afternoons for the other inmates. Together with friend Jura Soyfer, he composed the "Dachau Lied" ("Dachau Song"), which was learned by the other prisoners. Released in 1939, he accepted an invitation to conduct the Manila Symphony Orchestra. Jailed for four months by the Japanese during their occupation of the Philippines, after his release, he worked secretly for the Allies, transmitting shipping information by radio. After the war, he emigrated to the United States in 1946, where he conducted the Brooklyn Symphony Orchestra and promoted music education.

== Early life ==
He was born to a prosperous engineer and inventor in Vienna, Austria. He grew up in an affluent Jewish family in the cultural center of Europe, rubbing shoulders with many of the leading writers and artists of the time, and "studied at the Vienna Music Academy with Maurice Ravel and Richard Strauss." He worked as a composer and conductor.

== Imprisonment ==
On May 27, 1938, shortly after the Anschluss, Herbert and two of his brothers were arrested at their home and sent to Dachau concentration camp. Zipper arrived at Dachau on May 31. He would spend a year in this camp, but instead of sinking into despair, he used the experience to develop his character and his love for humanity, often volunteering for the most demeaning of jobs. Zipper used music and poetry to bolster the spirits of the other inmates. He eventually had instruments made from stolen wood and wire and gathered a group of 14 musician prisoners to form an orchestra, for which he composed music. The orchestra held secret rehearsals and gave concerts on Sunday afternoons in an unused latrine. Zipper said that the concerts were not for entertainment, but a means of keeping alive some small measure of civilization and of restoring value to their lives.

Zipper encountered the poet and writer Jura Soyfer, whom he had known in Vienna. Soyfer composed the lyrics and Zipper the music for the song "Dachau Lied", which was passed through the camp and eventually made its way to other camps, providing strength and hope to the prisoners. Zipper was working on the typhoid fever detail when Soyfer fell ill and eventually succumbed to the disease at the age of 26. The inmates on the detail had not been given proper protection nor even clean water to wash themselves and many contracted typhoid fever as a result. It was Zipper's responsibility to carry the victims to be buried. Herbert wrapped his friend in the prescribed paper shirt and placed him in the box for the unceremonious burial.

On September 23, 1938, Zipper was transferred to Buchenwald because of overcrowding at Dachau. Zipper and his brothers were fortunate that their father, Emil Zipper, had been in London trying to secure documents for the family to leave Austria. Emil was eventually able to secure the release of his sons. Zipper and his brothers were released on February 21, 1939, and returned home to Vienna. Zipper and one of his brothers traveled to join the rest of the family on March 16 in Paris.

== The Philippines ==
On May 3 of that year, Zipper received a call from the Philippines asking if he would accept the position of conductor of the Manila Symphony Orchestra. Zipper’s fiancée, renowned dancer Trudl Dubsky, had been working in Manila since 1937 and had recommended him for the post. Zipper accepted and joined Trudl in Manila, where they were married on October 1, 1939.

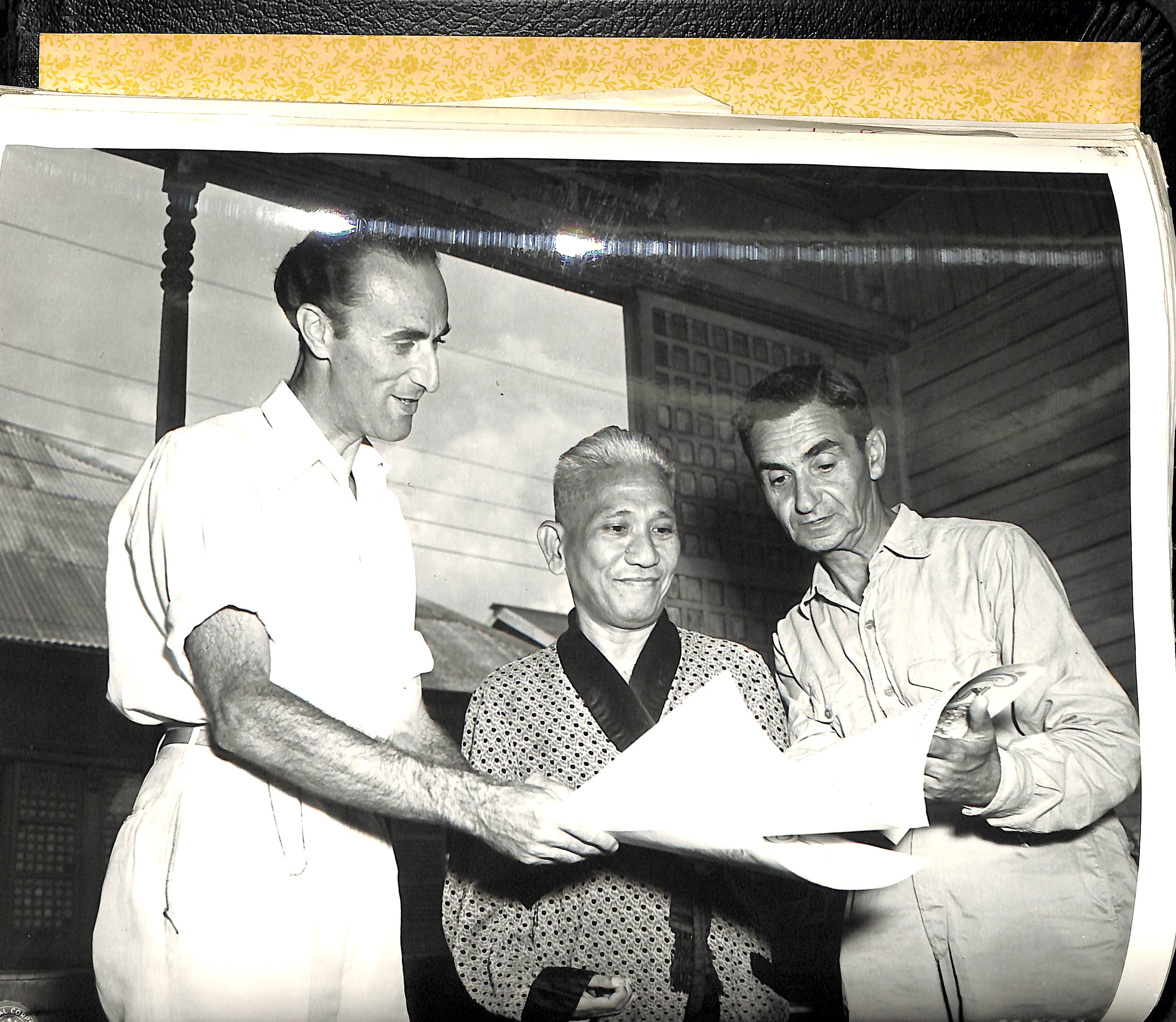
Herbert Zipper, Francisco Santiago, and Irving Berlin in Manila in 1945

Although the orchestra was of poor quality, Zipper’s skill and enthusiasm soon led to successful concerts. Then disaster struck. The Japanese invaded Manila, and Zipper found himself a prisoner again. After four months of imprisonment and interrogations, he was released, and he and Trudl spent the next few years helping friends and trying to stay alive, having lost what few belongings they had accumulated. Zipper made many friends while in Manila, including General MacArthur’s wife, who helped him organize a victory concert after the Allies liberated the island.

The Zippers had many brushes with death during the 30-day Battle of Manila in early 1945. On more than one occasion the buildings they occupied were directly hit by artillery shells. On February 26, 1945, at 4:00am, Herbert left their seven story, partially destroyed, apartment building to fetch the daily water. Recognizing an opportunity to make a run for American front lines, Zipper crossed battle lines to reach American troops. There he learned that the apartment building was scheduled to be razed to the ground by artillery bombardment in 15 minutes. Zipper exclaimed that the building could not be shelled as it was occupied by 800-1000 civilians and there were no enemy troops. The bombardment was delayed for 45 minutes, allowing Zipper to hasten back to begin an evacuation. He saved the lives of everyone in the apartment building, including his wife Trudl.

As an internee at Dachau, Herbert Zipper had vowed that he would one day commemorate the downfall of Adolf Hitler and the Nazi regime with a performance of Beethoven's 3rd Symphony "Eroica." One of his few possessions to survive the Battle of Manila was his musical score for the symphony, as he had carried it with him at all times during the intense battle. With the arrival of American forces on Luzon Island, Zipper set out to reconstitute his disbanded orchestra, though some members had not survived, including concertmaster Ernesto Vallejo. Like a phoenix from the ashes, the orchestra coalesced in the ruins of Santa Cruz Cathedral for the performance. War correspondent William J. Dunn, who reviewed the concert, recorded that on May 10, 1945, Herbert Zipper fulfilled the vow he had conceived at Dachau seven years prior. News of the fall of the Nazi regime reached Zipper the day following the concert.

== Emigration to the United States ==
In 1946, Zipper and his wife joined the rest of his family in the United States. His main reason for the trip was as a fundraising mission for the Philippine Cultural Rehabilitation Program that he had helped start. After only a few months, he received word that the program had been put on hold. While that project was stalled, Zipper saw as a deficit in arts education in U.S. schools and embarked on what would be his major life work — to help start community arts programs.

In 1947, Zipper was offered a teaching post at The New School for Social Research in New York, founded in 1918 by Alvin Johnson as one of the country’s first adult education centers. Over the next few decades, Zipper went on to start many community art centers throughout the country. He also worked on reviving the disbanded Brooklyn Symphony, a group which had not been active since their conductor, Sir Thomas Beecham, had returned to England. Zipper’s role of conductor with the Brooklyn Symphony focused much of their work on school outreach programs, while Zipper became increasingly involved in championing racial equality, social justice, and environmental causes.

In 1953, Zipper took the position of director of the Winnetka School of Music in the Chicago area, where he worked during the school year and then returned to Manila each summer to conduct a concert series. Winnetka was a community art school that served children and adults in afternoon and evening programs. In 1954, through a large fundraising effort, the school was relocated, expanded, and renamed Music Center of the North Shore (now the Music Institute of Chicago). Through this school, Zipper organized a professional orchestra whose purpose was to play concerts in area schools.

In 1972, Zipper accepted a job as project director for the Community School of Performing Arts at the University of Southern California. His beloved wife and partner Trudl died of cancer in 1976. Despite his grief, Zipper continued his zeal for the arts and in the early 1980s began trips to China where he served as a teacher, arts advocate, and conductor. Zipper helped the Community School of Performing Arts become the independent Colburn School in Los Angeles. He also conducted orchestra concerts for children in Los Angeles public schools from the 1970s through the 1990s.

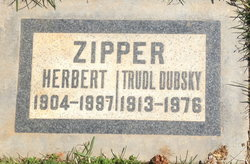
Trudl Dubsky and Herbert Zipper memorial plaque, Woodlawn Memorial Cemetery, Santa Monica, Los Angeles

Zipper remained active in the arts until his death in 1997 at age 92. He was the subject of the Oscar-nominated documentary Never Give Up: The 20th Century Odyssey of Herbert Zipper (1995). When the Colburn School moved to its own building in 1998, it named its primary performance space, Zipper Hall, in his honor.
