= Rose Kennedy: A Life to Remember =

1990 film by Terry Sanders

- Directed by: Terry Sanders
- Written by: Terry Sanders
- Produced by: Freida Lee Mock; Terry Sanders
- Cinematography: Tony Cutrono
- Production company: American Film Foundation
- Release date: 1990
- Country: United States
- Language: English

Rose Kennedy: A Life to Remember is a short documentary directed by Terry Sanders and produced by Sanders with Freida Lee Mock. It was nominated for a Best Documentary Short Oscar in 1991.
