= American Film Foundation =

California-based film production company

The American Film Foundation (AFF) is a production company based in Southern California. It was formed in 1976, headed by Terry Sanders and Freida Lee Mock. It produces films with a particular focus on the arts, humanities, and sciences. The company has won three Oscar awards among ten nominations and two Emmy awards. Most notable among those are the 1994 Academy Award for Best Documentary Feature Film for the film Maya Lin: A Strong Clear Vision and the 1988 Emmy Award for the documentary Lillian Gish: An Actor's Life for Me for the American Masters television series. The company has completed over 60 films till date.

== Selected works ==
- (1982) Screenwriters: Words Into Image
- (1988) Lillian Gish: The Actor's Life for Me, a documentary focusing on the career of American actress Lillian Gish
- (1990) Rose Kennedy: A Life to Remember, narrated by Edward Kennedy
- (1994) Maya Lin: A Strong Clear Vision
- (1995) Never Give Up: The 20th Century Odyssey of Herbert Zipper
- (2001) Sing!
- (2008) Fighting for Life
- (TBA) Wrestling with Angels
- (TBA) Tokyo Rose/American Patriot

== Controversies ==
In 1995, AFF went through a controversy when its documentary film Maya Lin: A Strong Clear Vision won the award for Academy Award for Best Documentary Feature Film at the 67th Academy Awards.

The press accused expressed their displeasure at the nomination and the subsequent awarding of the documentary, primarily because Mock was the film's director who had previously served as a chairperson at the Academy's documentary-feature screening committee. Film critic Kenneth Turan wrote that the documentary being nominated for the award "smacks of cronyism of the worst sort".
