= The Personals: Improvisations on Romance in the Golden Years =

1998 film

The Personals
- Directed by: Keiko Ibi
- Produced by: Keiko Ibi
- Cinematography: Greg Pak
- Edited by: Keiko Ibi; Milton Moses Ginsberg
- Distributed by: Fanlight Productions
- Release date: 1998
- Running time: 40 minutes
- Country: United States
- Language: English

The Personals (also known as The Personals: Improvisations on Romance in the Golden Years) is a 1998 American short documentary film directed by Keiko Ibi about a Jewish senior citizens' theatre group in New York City. In 1999, it won an Oscar at the 71st Academy Awards for Documentary Short Subject.

== Cast ==
- Gloria Bobrofsky as Performer
- Abram Calderon as Performer
- Deborah Ehrlich as Performer
- Seth Glassman as Performer
- Harold Gordon as Performer
- Harold Krinsky as Performer
- Ruth Krinsky as Performer
- Moe Kronberg as Performer
- Fred Schechter as Performer
- Rose Straub as Performer
- Shirley Tavel as Performer
- Selma Wernick as Performer
