= Freida Lee Mock =

American filmmaker

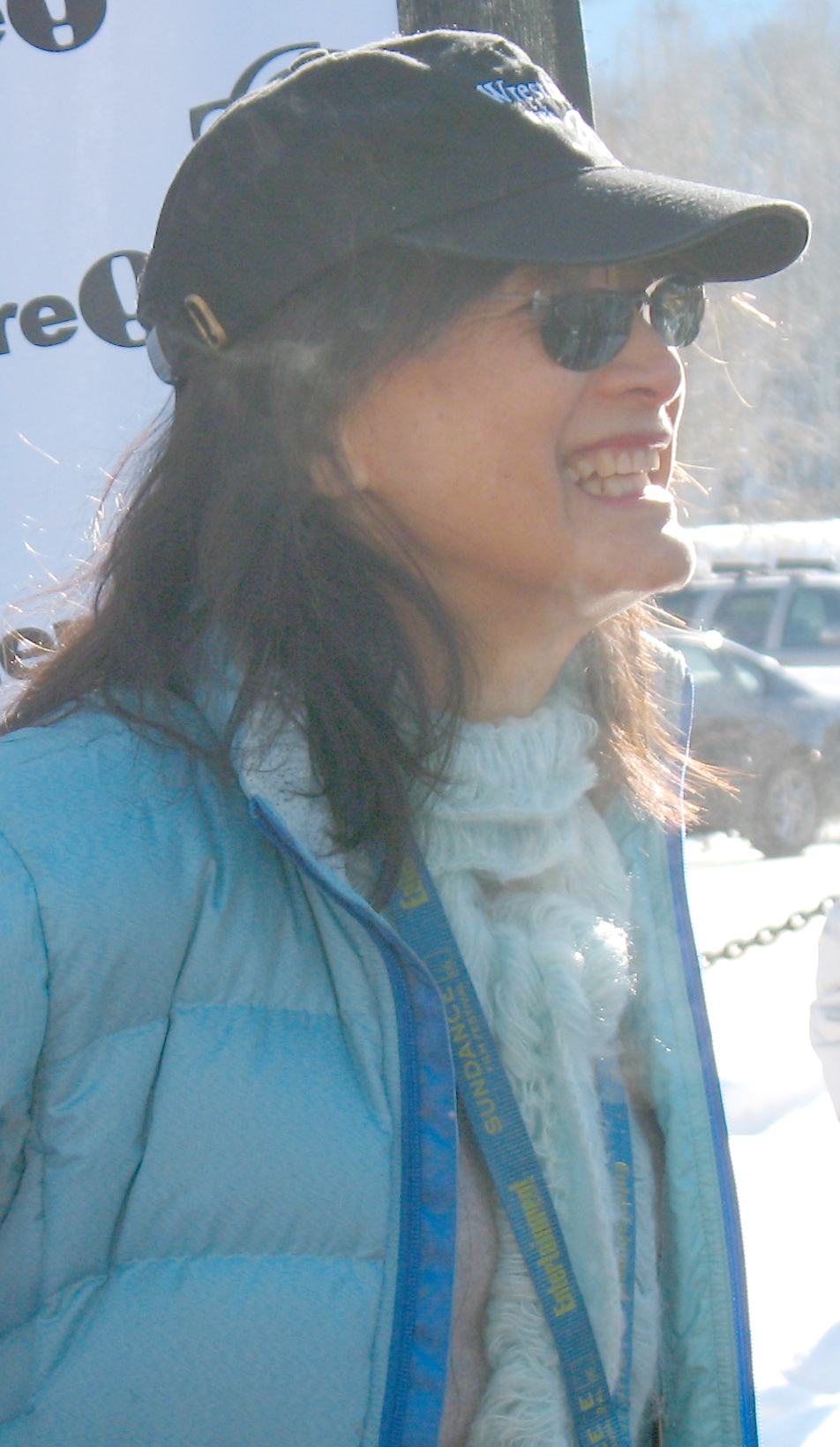
Freida Lee Mock at the Sundance Film Festival

Freida Lee Mock is an American filmmaker, director, screenwriter and producer. She is a co-founder of the American Film Foundation with Terry Sanders. Her documentary, Maya Lin: A Strong Clear Vision (1994) won an Academy Award for Best Feature Documentary in 1995.

== Background ==
Mock was the first Governor of the Documentary Branch of the Academy of Motion Picture Arts and Sciences. She received her bachelor's degree from the University of California, Berkeley, where she studied both History and Law.

== Director ==
Mock directed a documentary Anita, about Anita Hill, which premiered at the 2013 Sundance Film Festival. She has directed the documentaries G-Dog (2012), Sing China! (2009), Wrestling With Angels (2006) (which screened again on the TV show P.O.V. in 2007) a documentary feature about playwright Tony Kushner, Bird by Bird with Anne (1999; which screened again on the PBS TV show Independent Lens in 2003) about author Anne Lamott, Return with Honor (1998; which screened again on the TV show The American Experience in 2000), Maya Lin: A Strong Clear Vision (1994), and the documentary shorts Lt. Watada (2011), Sing! (2001; about a Los Angeles community children's choir and which was also an Academy Award nominee for Best Documentary Short Film in 2002), and various episodes of the TV show Screenwriters: Words Into Image in 1982, including episodes on the screenwriters Robert Towne, Carl Foreman, Neil Simon, Eleanor Perry, Paul Mazursky and William Goldman, all done in 1982 (the series was also a Primetime Emmy Award nominee for Best Series).

== Producer ==
Mock's production credits include many of the documentaries she directed, such as Maya Lin: A Strong Clear Vision, Sing!, Bird by Bird with Annie, Wrestling With Angels, G-Dog, Lt. Watada, Sing China! and Return with Honor, which was also presented by Tom Hanks.

Early in her career, Mock produced episodes of the TV show National Geographic Specials and Untamed Frontier. She has also produced the documentaries Rose Kennedy: A Life to Remember (Academy Award nominee for Best Documentary Short in 1991), To Live or Let Die (Academy Award nominee for Best Documentary Short in 1983), and Never Give Up: The 20th Century Odyssey of Herbert Zipper about Vienna-born composer and musician Herbert Zipper that was also an Academy Award nominee for Best Documentary Short in 1996. She also produced the Lillian Gish: The Actor's Life for Me (which won a Primetime Emmy Award for Outstanding Information Special in 1989).

Mock produced "The Kennedy Center Honors" biographies, which honors individuals for lifetime achievement in the performing arts -- Frank Sinatra, James Stewart, Katherine Dunham, Virgil Thomson, Elia Kazan and others (the series was also a Primetime Emmy Award Winner for Best Variety Special).

== Awards and accolades ==
Mock has received an Academy Award (for her film Maya Lin: A Strong Clear Vision), five Academy Award nominations (for films she either directed or produced), two prime-time Emmy Awards, and three prime-time Emmy Award nominations. The Maya Lin award was mired in controversy as acclaimed films such as Hoop Dreams failed to receive a nomination. Film critic Roger Ebert also suggested that the nomination of Maya Lin stemmed from cronyism as Mock was the chair of the committee which makes the nominations (though she stepped aside for the year that Maya Lin was under consideration), and was thus close friends with many of the committee members. Mock denied that the nomination in any way stemmed from cronyism and hired an attorney to respond to the press criticism. Ebert and his associate Gene Siskel publicly apologized to Mock after seeing Maya Lin, with Ebert saying "I think it's a good film and deserved to be nominated.", but other prominent critics such as Janet Maslin maintained that while Maya Lin was a good film it was clearly outshone by documentaries such as Hoop Dreams and Crumb which were passed up for nomination.

Mock is the recipient of grants from organizations such as the National Endowment for the Arts, the National Endowment for the Humanities, the Corporation for Public Broadcasting, the American Film Institute, Women in Film, the Robeson Fund and numerous foundations in support of her film projects.

== Selected filmography ==
- Sing!
- Maya Lin: A Strong Clear Vision. Academy Award Winner, Best Feature Documentary Film, 1995.
- Never Give Up: The 20th Century Odyssey of Herbert Zipper
- Rose Kennedy: A Life to Remember
- Return with Honor, presented by Tom Hanks
- To Live or Let Die
- Bird by Bird with Annie. A Film Portrait of Writer Anne Lamott
- G-DOG
- Anita: Speaking Truth to Power
- Ruth: Justice Ginsburg in Her Own Words
