= Terry Sanders =

American film director (born 1931)

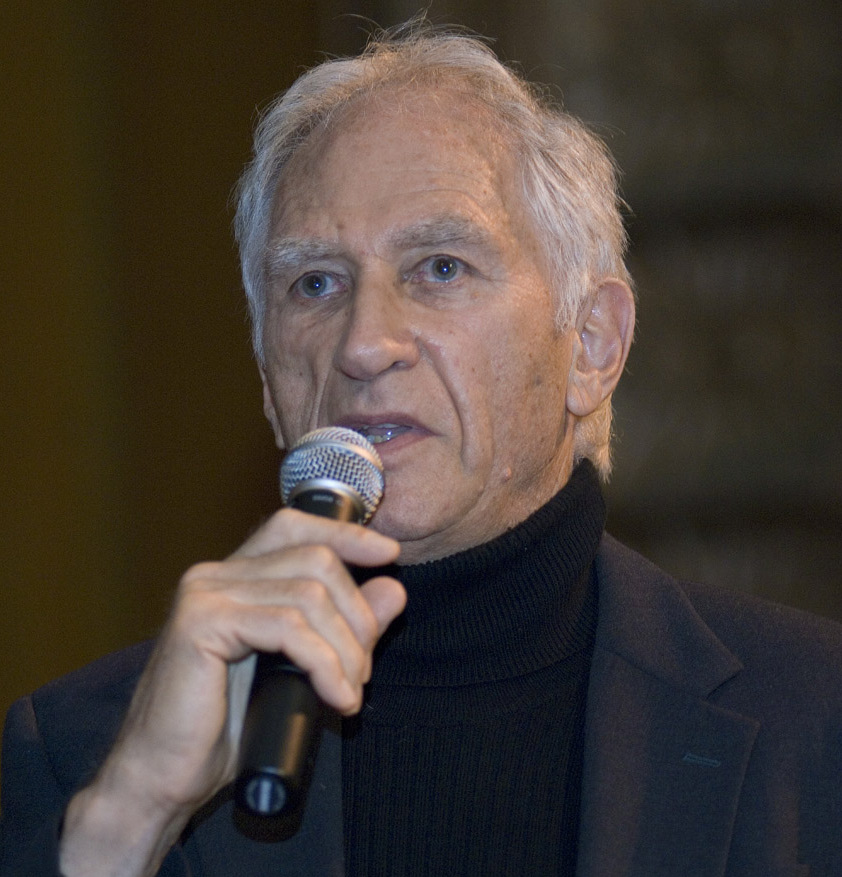
- Sanders in 2008
- Born: December 20, 1931 (age 94); New York City, New York, U.S.
- Occupation: Filmmaker
- Spouse: Freida Lee Mock
- Mother: Altina Schinasi

Terry Sanders (born December 20, 1931) is an American filmmaker and two-time Academy Award winner. He produced and/or directed more than 70 dramatic features, televisions specials, documentaries and portrait films.

== Career ==
Sanders co-heads the American Film Foundation and has produced and photographed the Oscar-winning dramatic short A Time Out of War. He was second unit director of the aerial scenes in Night of the Hunter. He received an Academy Award for Best Documentary Feature in 1994 for Maya Lin: A Strong Clear Vision. He also produced and co-directed Crime & Punishment, USA with his now-deceased brother, Denis Sanders. He worked as a producer-director for Davd Wolper Productions.

== Personal ==
He is the son of sculptor and designer Altina Schinasi.

== Filmography ==
- Liza, Liza, Skies are Grey 2017
- The Eyes of Don Bachardy
- Return with Honor, presented by Tom Hanks
- Into the Future: On the Preservation of Knowledge in the Electronic Age, 1997, narrated by Robert MacNeil (includes an interview with Tim Berners-Lee and Peter Norton of Norton Utilities)
- Never Give Up: The 20th Century Odyssey of Herbert Zipper, 1995
- Maya Lin: A Strong Clear Vision, 1994, (Oscar win)
- Rose Kennedy: A Life to Remember, 1990, narrated by Edward Kennedy (Oscar nomination)
- Slow Fires: On the Preservation of the Human Record (1987)
- The Japan Project: Made in Japan
- To Live or Let Die, 1982 (Oscar nominated)
- Screenwriters: Words Into Images, 1982
- The New Indians (1976), a National Geographic Society and WQED-Pittsburgh production produced by Sanders and Freida Lee Mock; directed by Sanders; and narrated by Robert Redford
- Copland Portrait, American Composer with Aaron Copland (1975), produced and directed by Sanders and co-produced by Freida Lee Mock, for US Information Agency
- Four Stones for Kanemitsu, 1973, (Oscar nomination)
- Lillian Gish: The Actor's Life for Me
- Portrait of Zubin Mehta (1967), produced and directed by Sanders, for US Information Agency and narrated by Lawrence Dobkin
- A Meeting With America (1965), for US Information Agency about the visit of US visit of Upper Volta President Maurice Yameogo
- 1964:The Conventions (1964), written, produced, and directed, for US Information Agency and narrated by Lawrence Dobkin
- Fighting for Life
- War Hunt,1962
- Crime & Punishment, USA, 1959
- A Time Out of War, 1954

== See also ==
- American Film Foundation (co-founder)
- Denis Sanders
