= Amanda Jones (composer) =

American composer

- Born: October 26, 1988 (age 38); Columbia, Maryland
- Genres: Indie rock, cinematic music
- Occupations: Musician, composer
- Instruments: Acoustic and electric guitar, piano and voice
- Years active: 2009-present
- Member of: The Anti-Job
- Website: www.amandacomposer.com

Amanda Jones is an American composer and musician who has composed scores for films, commercials, and television series. She is a member of the indie rock band The Anti-Job and has earned the distinction of becoming the first African American woman nominated in a score category at the Emmys for her work on the Apple TV+ series Home.

== Life ==
Jones was born on October 26, 1988, in Columbia, Maryland and began playing piano at the age of three and guitar around the age of fourteen. Jones attended Vassar College intending to study chemistry but subsequently changed her major to music. Jones studied music composition, production, and classical guitar under Terry Champlin. She earned an A.B. in music from Vassar and received certificates in film scoring and orchestration from the Berklee College of Music.

After graduating from Vassar, Jones moved to Los Angeles in 2010 to record with her indie rock band, The Anti-Job, and started to consider a parallel career composing music for television and films.

== Career ==
In 2014 through 2016, Jones worked as a music production assistant for Hans Zimmer, Henry Jackson, John Powell, and Michael Levine. Her work during that time included the films How to Train Your Dragon 2 and Kingsman: The Secret Service.

In 2016, Jones landed a job as a senior music coordinator for Lionsgate. During that time she worked on several television series including Nashville (CMT), Dear White People (Netflix), and Greenleaf (OWN). In 2018, Jones got an opportunity to score her first feature film, One Angry Black Man. Jones has since scored numerous short and feature films, including Andre Hormann's documentary feature Ringside; Smriti Mundhra and Sami Khan’s Oscar-nominated documentary St. Louis Superman; and Sujata Day’s feature film Definition Please.

Jones television credits include OWN’s anthology series Cherish the Day, produced by Ava DuVernay; BET’s Twenties produced by Lena Waithe; HBO’s A Black Lady Sketch Show produced by Robin Thede and Issa Rae; the comedy series Shitty Boyfriends produced by Lisa Kudrow; Love in the Time of Corona on Freeform; and the Apple TV+ series Home.

Jones scored the “Maine” episode of Home, for which she received an Emmy Award nomination for Outstanding Music Composition for a Documentary Series or Special (Original Dramatic Score), becoming the first African American woman nominated in a scores category at the Emmys.

== Discography ==
Year	Title	Label
2020	Home: Season 1 Episode V, "Maine" (Apple TV+ Original S Series Soundtrack)	Lakeshore
2020	Twenties (Original Series Soundtrack)	Lakeshore

== Films ==
Year	Title	Director	Notes
2018	One Angry Black Man	Menelek Lumumba	
2019	Ringside	Andre Hormann	
2019	St. Louis Superman	Sami Kahn	
2020	Definition Please	Sujata Day	
2020	On the 12th Date of Christmas	Gary Yates	
2021	Burros	Jefferson Stein	
2023	The Perfect Find	Numa Perrier	
2024	I Am Ready, Warden	Smriti Mundhra	Short documentary film
2026	Cookie Queens	Alysa Nahmias	

== Television ==
Year	Title	Episodes	Notes
2015	Shitty Boyfriends	8	
2019	A Black Lady Sketch Show	6	
2020	Twenties	8	
2020-2022	Home	2	TV docuseries Nominated for Primetime Emmy Award for Outstanding Music Composition for a Documentary Series or Special (Original Dramatic Score) (for "Maine"); Won for Daytime Emmy Award for Outstanding Music Direction and Composition (2023)
2020	Love in the Time of Corona	4	
2020	Cherish the Day	8	
2020	Adventure Time: Distant Lands	2	
2021–24	Good Trouble	57	seasons 3–5
2022	Naomi	13	
2023-25	Adventure Time: Fionna and Cake	20	season 1-2
2023	Young Love	12	
2025	Murderbot	10	season 1

== Awards and nominations ==
- Primetime Emmy Award for Outstanding Music Composition for a Documentary Series or Special (Original Dramatic Score) -Home – "Maine" – Apple TV+ – MediaWeaver/Four M Studios/Altimeter Films, Composer.
- NAACP Image Award for Outstanding Gospel/Christian Album for Greenleaf on OWN.
- S&G Rising Award for musical composition work in film and television (2019).
- Daytime Emmy Award for Outstanding Music Direction and Composition - Home: Season 2 – Apple TV+

== Initiatives ==
Co-founder of Composers Diversity Collective whose mission is to increase the visibility of composers of diverse backgrounds and facilitates mentoring.
