= Guy Mossman =

American cinematographer and director

- Born: U.S.
- Occupations: Cinematographer; Director
- Years active: 2007 - Present
- Spouse: Lisa Hepner

Guy Mossman is an American documentary cinematographer and director. He is known for his cinematography work on Buck (2011), Bending the Arc (2017), and Feels Good Man (2020), and has lensed and co-directed the feature documentaries The Human Trial (2022) and Speak. (2025).

== Life and career ==
Mossman graduated from Colorado College in 1995, where he studied studio art and played on the men’s soccer team under longtime head coach Horst Richardson. In 1999 he produced his first short film while serving as a Peace Corps volunteer in Paraguay. He later pursued an M.A. in Journalism and Documentary Filmmaking at the University of North Carolina-Chapel Hill, where he was awarded a Park Fellowship in 2002. In the mid-2000s, he co-founded Vox Pop Films in Tribeca, New York, with his wife, filmmaker Lisa Hepner, producing documentaries like Women on the Frontlines (2004), which premiered at the United Nations and aired on PBS.

Mossman’s cinematography on Buck was noted at the Sundance Film Festival and in national reviews, with coverage in the Los Angeles Times. He contributed cinematography to documentaries including Bending the Arc (2017) and Feels Good Man (2020). He co-directed The Human Trial (2022) with Lisa Hepner, the film documents a stem cell clinical trial for Type 1 diabetes. It received a theatrical release followed by digital and VOD availability through Abramorama Films, with official materials listing Mossman as co-director and cinematographer. On television, he served as series cinematographer on NuvoTV’s Los Jets (2014).

In 2025, Mossman collaborated with director Jennifer Tiexiera on SPEAK., a feature documentary that follows five high-school orators through a nine-month season culminating at the National Speech & Debate Association (NSDA) Nationals. The film premiered in the U.S. Documentary Competition at the Sundance Film Festival and has attended over 85 festivals worldwide.

== Selected filmography ==
Year	Title	Contribution	Note
2026	I'm Chevy Chase and You're Not	Cinematographer	Documentary
2025	Speak.	Co-director, cinematographer and producer	Documentary
2024	Little Empty Boxes	Cinematographer	Documentary
2024	The Antisocial Network	Cinematographer	Documentary
2022	The Human Trial	Co-director and cinematography	Documentary
2022	Land of the Giants: Titans of Tech	Cinematographer	4 Episodes
2020	Unfit: The Psychology of Donald Trump	Cinematographer	Documentary
2020	Feels Good Man	Cinematographer	Documentary
2019	Chasing the Cure	Cinematography	2 Episodes
2018	Owned: A Tale of Two Americas	Cinematography	Documentary
2017	Joe Cocker: Mad Dog with Soul	Cinematographer	Documentary
2017	Bending the Arc	Cinematographer	Documentary
2016	Magicians: Life in the Impossible	Cinematographer	Documentary
2012	Comic-Con Episode IV: A Fan's Hope	Cinematographer	Documentary
2012	Mariachi High	Cinematographer	Documentary
2011	Buck	Cinematographer	Documentary
2008	The End of America	Cinematographer	Documentary

== Awards and nominations ==
Year	Result	Award	Category	Work	Ref.
2025	Won	Full Frame Documentary Film Festival	Kathleen Bryan Edwards Award for Human Rights	SPEAK.	
2025	Nominated	Thessaloniki Documentary Festival	Special Mention	SPEAK.	
2025	Nominated	Sundance Film Festival	Best Documentary	SPEAK.	
2025	Nominated	Nashville Film Festival	Best Documentary Feature	SPEAK.	
2025	Nominated	Calgary International Film Festival	Best International Documentary	SPEAK.	
2025	Nominated	Cleveland International Film Festival	Ad Hoc Docs Competition	SPEAK.	
2025	Nominated	Cleveland International Film Festival	FilmSlam Student Choice Award	SPEAK.	
2023	Nominated	Humanitas Prize	Best Documentary	The Human Trial	
2022	Won	Mumbai International Film Festival	Best Documentary Feature	The Human Trial	
