= Burros =

Burros may refer to:

- Burros (film)
- Burros (surname)
- Feral donkeys
