= Lisa Hepner =

Canadian-American documentary filmmaker

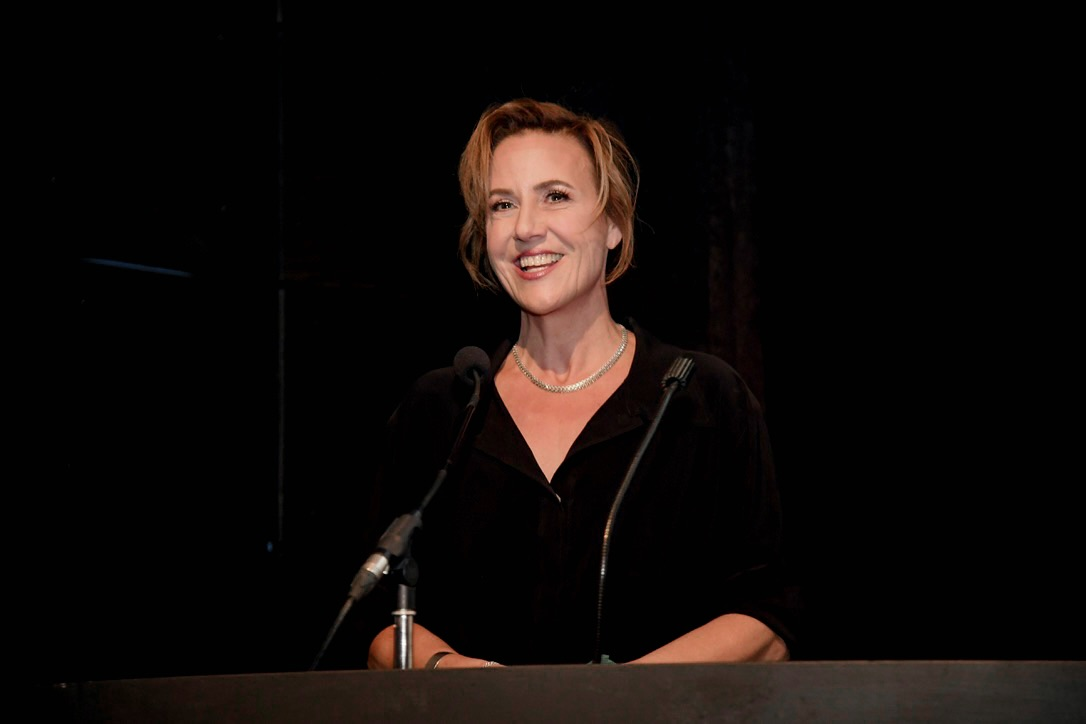
- Born: Ottawa, Ontario, Canada
- Occupations: Director; writer; producer
- Years active: 1996 – present

Lisa Hepner is a Canadian-American writer and documentary filmmaker. She is best known for directing the documentary features, The Human Trial and Women on the Frontlines.

== Career ==
Lisa graduated from Victoria College at the University of Toronto in 1993. She began her career as a journalist in Canada, but turned her writing into producing non-fiction projects when she moved to New York City. From 1995 to 2011, she produced documentaries for the CBC, PBS, HBO, MTV, Sony Pictures Classics, working alongside directors, Michael Apted, Jonathan Demme, and Lisa F. Jackson, among others.

In 2004, Lisa co-directed the documentary feature, Women on the Frontlines, that premiered at the United Nations in New York and aired on PBS. Soon after, Lisa and her cinematographer husband Guy Mossman started Vox Pop Films, a production company in Tribeca. In 2009, the couple moved to Los Angeles where Vox Pop focused on branded content and commercials.

In 2022, Lisa directed her first documentary feature, The Human Trial. The film follows a radical stem cell treatment that might be the cure for type 1 diabetes. Since the film's release, it has been featured in the New York Times, NPR, The National News and Forbes, as well as the CBC and the Toronto Star. The film was nominated for a Humanitas Prize in 2023.

In 2024, Lisa executive produced SPEAK. a feature documentary that premiered at the 2025 Sundance Film Festival. The film was awarded the Kathleen Bryan Edwards Award for Human Rights at the Full Frame Documentary Festival in 2025.

When Lisa isn't consulting on films, she works as an adjunct professor at USC’s School of Cinematic Arts. She is a member of the Producers Guild of America, New York Women in Film & Television, the Writers Guild of America, and Roco Voices, a speaker's platform for documentary filmmakers.

== Filmography ==
Year	Title	Contribution	Note
2025	Speak.	Executive producer	Documentary
2022	The Human Trial	Director, writer and producer	Documentary
2011	Dreamland	Field producer	Documentary
2011	Comic-Con Episode IV: A Fan's Hope	Field producer	Documentary
2011	Buck	Field Director	Documentary
2010	Native Century	Line producer	1 Episode
2009	The Winemakers	Field producer	TV Series
2008	The Making of 'Across the Universe'	Field producer	Documentary
2008	Pressure Cooker	Post Producer	Documentary
2007	Man from Plains	Post-production supervisor	Documentary
2007	Right to Return: New Home Movies from the Lower 9th Ward	Executive Producer	TV Series
2006	Exposé: America's Investigative Reports	Coordinating producer	12 Episodes
2006	Texas Ranch House	Story Producer	8 Episodes
2005	Operation Homecoming	Field producer	TV Series
2004	Women on the Frontlines	Director and producer	Documentary
2003	Naked World: America Undercover	Producer	Documentary
2003	Married in America	Associate producer	Documentary
2000	Face to Face: The Schappell Twins	Associate producer	Documentary
2000	Life Afterlife	Co-producer	Documentary
2000	Intimate Portrait : Cokie Roberts	Field producer	1 Episode
1998-2000	True Life	Producer	2 Episodes
1998	Molly O'Neill's New York: A Taste of the City	Co-producer	Documentary
1996	Travels with Mom	Producer	1 Episode

== Awards and nominations ==
Year	Result	Award	Category	Work	Ref.
2025	Won	Kathleen Bryan Edwards Award for Human Rights	Documentary Feature	SPEAK.	
2023	Nominated	Humanitas Prize	Best Documentary	The Human Trial	
2023	Won	Brussels International Film Festival	Best Documentary	The Human Trial	
2022	Won	Mumbai International Film Festival	Best Documentary Feature	The Human Trial	
2022	Won	Cine Paris Film Festival	Best Documentary Feature	The Human Trial	
2022	Won	Filmocracy Fest	Best Documentary Feature	The Human Trial	
2022	Won	Raw Science Film Festival	Raw Breakthrough Award in Science Communication	The Human Trial	
2014	Nominated	Clio Awards	Long Form	The Comeback Initiative	
2004	Won	Golden Eagle Cine Award	Professional Telecast Non-Fiction Division	Women on the Frontlines	
