= Belfast Festival =

Belfast Festival may refer to:

- Belfast Festival at Queen's, an arts festival at Queen's University, Belfast
- Belfast Film Festival, a film festival in Belfast
- CineMagic (film festival), a children's film festival based in Belfast and Dublin
