= Burros (film) =

- Official film poster
- Directed by: Jefferson Stein
- Written by: Jefferson Stein
- Produced by: Liz Cardenas; Russell Sheaffer; Jefferson Stein; Douglas Riggs
- Starring: Amaya Juan; Zuemmy Carrillo; Virginia Patricio
- Cinematography: Cole Graham
- Edited by: R. Brett Thomas
- Music by: Amanda Jones
- Production companies: UnbeliEVAble Entertainment; Ten to the Six Pictures; Artless Media
- Release date: June 18, 2021 (Tribeca)
- Running time: 15 mins.
- Country: United States
- Languages: English; Spanish; O'odham

Burros is a 2021 American short drama film written and directed by Jefferson Stein and starring a cast of first-time actors from the Tohono O'odham Nation where it is set. Eva Longoria serves as an executive producer.

The film held its world premiere at the 20th Annual Tribeca Film Festival on June 18, 2021, and won the Jury Award in the Live Action Short category at the 25th Annual New York International Children's Film Festival qualifying it for the 95th Annual Academy Awards.

== Plot ==
After her father, a Tohono O'odham tracker, leaves for work assisting the United States Border Patrol on the Mexico–U.S. border, Elsa, a six-year-old Tohono O'odham girl, finds a Hispanic migrant her age, separated from her father as she crossed the border into the United States. Unable to communicate, Elsa takes her through her community in Sells, Arizona and ultimately to her grandmother, Gagi, who speaks Spanish, English, and O'odham and bridges the language barrier.

== Cast ==
- Amaya Juan as Elsa
- Zuemmy Carrillo as Ena
- Virginia Patricio as Gagi
- Rupert Lopez as Joe
- Armondo 'Mondo' Gonzales as Mondo
- Michael Geronimo as Beatboxer
- Carlos Chico as Beatboxer

== Production ==
=== Development and pre-production ===
Jefferson Stein researched the Tohono O’odham Nation for two years and worked with the community on the subject matter of the film. He and the producers lived on the reservation during pre-production. Stein further explained this, by saying: "Awareness is the first thing. There were hundreds of stories that I heard while I was there that inspired moments of this project." The film is told over a 24-hour period, ending where it starts, done to highlight the cyclical nature of the separation of families at the border.

The film was developed through fiscal sponsorship by Film Independent.

=== Casting ===
The actors in the film had not acted before. Amaya Juan was discovered through the local Toka team, the women-only sport she plays in the film. Zuemmy Carrillo was cast during lunch at a Bilingual elementary school in nearby Tucson.

=== Filming ===
Principal photography took place over four days on the Tohono O'odham Nation Reservation.

== Release ==
The film had its World Premiere at the Tribeca Film Festival on June 18, 2021.

== Awards and nominations ==
Year	Award	Film Festival	Recipients	Result
2021	Best Short Film	Rhode Island International Film Festival	Burros	Nominated
2021	Best Narrative Short - Jury Award	Sidewalk Film Festival	Burros	Won
2021	Best Short Film	HollyShorts Film Festival	Burros	Nominated
2021	Best Short Film - Panorama	Tirana International Film Festival	Burros	Nominated
2021	Best Narrative Short - Grand Jury Prize	Nashville Film Festival	Burros	Nominated
2021	NAHCC's Best Hispanic Film at Nashville Film Festival Award	Nashville Film Festival	Burros	Won
2021	Best Short Film - Live Action	Edmonton International Film Festival	Burros	Nominated
2021	Best Narrative Short - Jury Award	Portland Film Festival	Burros	Nominated
2021	Best Narrative Short Film	BendFilm Festival	Burros	Nominated
2021	Best Narrative Short - Audience Choice	Santa Fe Independent Film Festival	Burros	Won
2021	International Competition - Best Short Film	Kerry Film Festival	Burros	Nominated
2021	Jury Prize for Outstanding Ensemble Cast	Tallgrass Film Festival	Cast of Burros	Won
2021	Best International Short Film	Evolution Mallorca International Film Festival	Burros	Nominated
2021	Pronck Shorts Competition Award	Leiden International Film Festival	Burros	Nominated
2021	Best Short Fiction Film	Leeds International Film Festival	Burros	Nominated
2021	Best Live Action Short Film	Chicago International Children's Film Festival	Burros	Nominated
2022	Best International Film	Minimalen Short Film Festival	Burros	Nominated
2022	Jury Favorite	Nitehawk Shorts Festival	Burros	Won
2022	Audience Award (ages 10+)	New York International Children's Film Festival	Burros	Nominated
2022	Jury Award Live Action Short Film	New York International Children's Film Festival	Burros	Won
2022	Best Short Film Award	Miami International Film Festival	Burros	Nominated
2022	Best Dramatic Short	Arizona International Film Festival	Burros	Won
2022	Official Competition supported by Sony - Best Short Award	Short Shorts Film Festival & Asia	Burros	Nominated
2022	Maremetraggio Competition - Best Short Film	ShorTS International Film Festival	Burros	Nominated
2022	Best Indigenous Film	Cordillera International Film Festival	Burros	Nominated
2022	Best Dramatic Short - 2nd Runner Up	Woods Hole Film Festival	Burros	Won
2022	Moonwalker Short Award - Best Short Film	Nòt Film Fest	Burros	Won
2022	Best Narrative Short - Jury Award	Albuquerque Film & Music Experience	Burros	Won
2022	Best Short Film - Audience Award	Indie Street Film Festival	Burros	Won
2022	Shorts Spotlight: Best of Show	SCAD Savannah Film Festival	Burros	Won
2022	New Wave Jury: Runner Up	Cornwall Film Festival	Burros	Won
2022	Best Live Action Short Film	RNCI Red Nation Awards	Burros	Won
2022	Red Nation Honors: Film Consultant Award - Larry ‘Bear’ Wilson for Burros	RNCI Red Nation Awards	Larry 'Bear' Wilson	Won
2022	Best Short Film - Teenage Jury	Cinemagic Film Festival - Belfast	Burros	Won
