= SWIFF =

SWIFF or Swiff may refer to:

- Screenwave International Film Festival (2025/6–2023), Coffs Coast, New South Wales, Australia
- South Western International Film Festival (2015–2022), Sarnia, Ontario, Canada
- SWF, a defunct Adobe Flash file format
