= Jefferson Stein =

American filmmaker

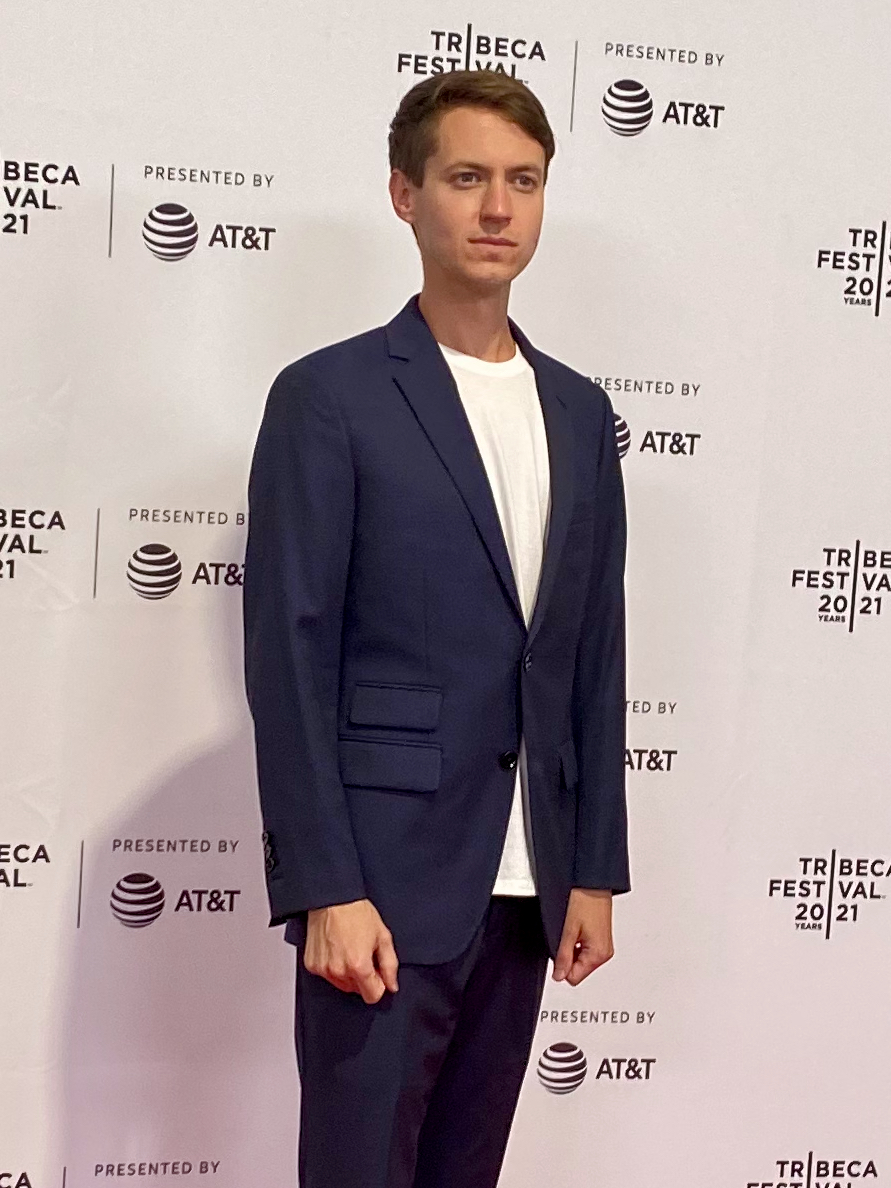
- Stein at the 2021 Tribeca Film Festival in Lower Manhattan, New York
- Born: February 10, 1989 (age 37); Dallas, Texas, U.S.
- Education: Hillcrest High School
- Alma mater: University of Texas at Austin (BBA); ArtCenter College of Design (MFA)
- Occupations: Director; writer; producer
- Years active: 2011–present
- Website: jeffersonstein.com

Jefferson Stein (born February 10, 1989) is an American filmmaker. He is best known for his 2021 film Burros, executive produced by Eva Longoria, which premiered at the 20th Annual Tribeca Film Festival and won the Jury Award in the Live Action Short category at the 25th New York International Children's Film Festival, where it qualified for the 95th Academy Awards.

== Background ==
Stein was born in Dallas. The oldest of four, he began making films as a child with VHS camcorders with his siblings, which evolved into making half-hour movies in his teenage years with his school friends. He graduated from Hillcrest High School in the city and the Business Honors Program (BHP) at the University of Texas at Austin. In 2011 he made a short film, Wayfarer, as part of his admission into Art Center College of Design in Pasadena, California where he pursued an MFA degree in directing and studied under Allen Daviau. As a student, he won a Silver Addy Award at the American Advertising Awards.

Beyond his student work, Stein made the film, Tumble Dry Low in 2015 on a shoestring budget of $1,500. It premiered at the Seattle International Film Festival, the Tallinn Black Night Film Festival in Tallinn, Estonia, and the San Diego International Film Festival, winning the Gold Remi award in the Live Action Narrative category at the 48th WorldFest-Houston International Film Festival in Houston. It was featured on Short of the Week and released by Omeleto, where it received over 2.5 million views. With the film, Stein was included in the 2015 Shoot "New Director's Showcase."

Stein's 2015 television advertisement for American Airlines was included in Shoot's "Best Work You May Never See." In 2016, he directed documentary shorts featuring UFC Welterweight Champion Johny Hendricks and UFC contender Donald Cerrone. In 2018, Stein directed documentary shorts for VICE featuring NBA basketball player Courtney Lee and Olympic gold medalist Candace Parker about becoming the first female athlete to slam dunk in a basketball game.

In 2020, Stein's script, Man in the Maze (I'itoi), a narrative feature set in the same world as Burros, was selected as a quarterfinalist for the Academy of Motion Picture Arts and Sciences Nicholl Fellowships in Screenwriting. In 2021, his short film, Burros, premiered at the 20th Annual Tribeca Film Festival after it was developed through fiscal sponsorship by Film Independent. The film has a cast of first-time actors from the Tohono O'odham Nation, where it is set and focuses on the Tohono O'odham living on the Mexico–United States border, immigration, and the Mexican drug war. Burros qualified for the 95th Annual Academy Awards after its Jury Award win in the Live Action Short category at the 25th Annual New York International Children's Film Festival. The festival jury included Uma Thurman, Geena Davis, Matthew Modine, and Kyle MacLachlan.

Stein lives in Los Angeles.

== Filmography ==
Year	Title	Role	Notes
2011	Wayfarer	Director, producer, writer	Narrative short
2012	The Animal	Director, writer	Narrative short
2013	T. and Sugar	Director, writer	Narrative short
2015	Tumble Dry Low	Director, producer, writer	Narrative short
2021	Burros	Director, producer, writer	Narrative short

== Awards and nominations ==
=== Film festival awards ===
Year	Award	Film Festival	Recipients	Result
2015	Gold Remi Award - Live Action Narrative Short Subject	WorldFest-Houston International Film Festival	Tumble Dry Low	Won
2015	Best Short Film - Honorable Mention	SENE Film, Music and Art Festival	Tumble Dry Low	Won
2021	Best Short Film	Rhode Island International Film Festival	Burros	Nominated
2021	Best Narrative Short - Jury Award	Sidewalk Film Festival	Burros	Won
2021	Best Short Film	HollyShorts Film Festival	Burros	Nominated
2021	Best Short Film - Panorama	Tirana International Film Festival	Burros	Nominated
2021	Best Narrative Short - Grand Jury Prize	Nashville Film Festival	Burros	Nominated
2021	NAHCC's Best Hispanic Film at Nashville Film Festival Award	Nashville Film Festival	Burros	Won
2021	Best Short Film - Live Action	Edmonton International Film Festival	Burros	Nominated
2021	Best Narrative Short - Jury Award	Portland Film Festival	Burros	Nominated
2021	Best Narrative Short Film	BendFilm Festival	Burros	Nominated
2021	Best Narrative Short - Audience Choice	Santa Fe Independent Film Festival	Burros	Won
2021	International Competition - Best Short Film	Kerry Film Festival	Burros	Nominated
2021	Jury Prize for Outstanding Ensemble Cast	Tallgrass Film Festival	Burros	Won
2021	Best International Short Film	Evolution Mallorca International Film Festival	Burros	Nominated
2021	Pronck Shorts Competition Award	Leiden International Film Festival	Burros	Nominated
2021	Best Short Fiction Film	Leeds International Film Festival	Burros	Nominated
2021	Best Live Action Short Film	Chicago International Children's Film Festival	Burros	Nominated
2022	Best International Film	Minimalen Short Film Festival	Burros	Nominated
2022	Jury Favorite	Nitehawk Shorts Festival	Burros	Won
2022	Audience Award (ages 10+)	New York International Children's Film Festival	Burros	Nominated
2022	Jury Award Live Action Short Film	New York International Children's Film Festival	Burros	Won
2022	Best Short Film Award	Miami International Film Festival	Burros	Nominated
2022	Best Dramatic Short	Arizona International Film Festival	Burros	Won
2022	Official Competition supported by Sony - Best Short Award	Short Shorts Film Festival & Asia	Burros	Nominated
2022	Maremetraggio Competition - Best Short Film	ShorTS International Film Festival	Burros	Nominated
2022	Best Indigenous Film	Cordillera International Film Festival	Burros	Nominated
2022	Best Dramatic Short - 2nd Runner Up	Woods Hole Film Festival	Burros	Won
2022	Moonwalker Short Award - Best Short Film	Nòt Film Fest	Burros	Won
2022	Best Narrative Short - Jury Award	Albuquerque Film & Music Experience	Burros	Won
2022	Best Short Film - Audience Award	Indie Street Film Festival	Burros	Won
2022	Shorts Spotlight: Best of Show	SCAD Savannah Film Festival	Burros	Won
2022	New Wave Jury: Runner Up	Cornwall Film Festival	Burros	Won
2022	Best Live Action Short Film	RNCI Red Nation Awards	Burros	Won
2022	Best Short Film - Teenage Jury	Cinemagic Film Festival - Belfast	Burros	Won
