= Tony Pecinovsky =

American author & politician

Personal details
- Born: October 11, 1977 (age 49)
- Party: Communist Party USA
- Occupation: Activist, politician, journalist, president of St. Louis Workers' Education Society, president of International Publishers

Tony Pecinovsky (born October 11, 1977) is an American journalist, activist, and politician from St. Louis, Missouri and President of the Saint Louis Workers' Education Society, which was opened in 2014, and President of International Publishers. Pecinovsky is also the author of Let Them Tremble: Biographical Interventions Marking 100 Years of the Communist Party, USA. He regularly speaks at colleges and universities across the U.S.

== Biography ==
Pecinovsky is a member of the Communist Party USA, and serves as the district organizer for the party in Kansas and Missouri.

Pecinovsky is a contributor for People's World, the St. Louis/Southern Illinois, Labor Tribune, Shelterforce, Z-Magazine, AlterNet, Jacobin, Political Affairs (magazine).

From 2010 to 2015 Pecinovsky served as a member of several local St. Louis political and labor organizations including the United Media Guild, Greater St. Louis CWA City Council, St. Louis Jobs with Justice and served as a delegate to the Greater St. Louis Central Labor Council.

== Political career ==
Pecinovsky is a delegate to the Greater St. Louis Central Labor Council, a member of the Missouri Progressive Coalition board and on the committee of the Missouri Immigrant and Refugee Advocates coalition. Pecinovsky was one of eighteen candidates who publicly opposed the attempted privatization of the St. Louis Lambert International Airport.

Pecinovsky is a supporter of former Missouri state representative Bruce Franks Jr.

Pecinovsky ran for St. Louis Board of Aldermen Ward 14 as a Democrat against incumbent Democrat Carol Howard. Pecinovsky lost the March 5th 2019 election 622 votes (47.99%) to Howard's 674 votes (52.01%).
