= Sam Hamadeh =

Hussam "Sam" Hamadeh (1971 – December 10, 2015) was a media entrepreneur based in New York with business interests in digital media, publishing, and film.

Hamadeh co-founded Vault.com in 1997 with his brother, Samer Hamadeh, and Mark Oldman. and served as the company's President through its successful sale in 2007 to private equity firm VSS, reportedly for nearly $100 million. In 2009, Hamadeh founded PrivCo, which provides data to subscribers on more than 500,000 private companies. Hamadeh was chief executive of PrivCo, and also a frequent commentator on private companies for mass media, until his death in December 2015.

Hamadeh was a graduate of UCLA, the University of Pennsylvania Law School with a JD, and the Wharton School of Business with an MBA. He spoke and wrote frequently about entrepreneurship, including serving as the Keynote Speaker at Wharton's Annual Entrepreneurship Conference.

Honors and awards have included Crain's Top Entrepreneur's Award, the Harvard Business School Club's Entrepreneur of the Year Silicon Alley Reporter's "100 Most Important Internet Executives" Deloitte & Touche's 50 Fastest Growing Companies, and the University of Pennsylvania Law School's Young Alumnus of the Year award.

He served as an Executive Producer of films Home Movie starring Adrian Pasdar, and Made For Each Other starring Chris Masterson, Danny Masterson, and Bijou Phillips.

Hamadeh co-hosted a fundraiser for a Democratic congressional candidate with Twitter co-founder Jack Dorsey in January 2010.

He died in 2015.
