= A Suitable Girl (film) =

2017 Documentary film

- Theatrical release poster
- Directed by: Sarita Khurana; Smriti Mundhra
- Written by: Sarita Khurana; Smriti Mundhra; Jennifer Tiexiera
- Produced by: Cal Amir (exec.); Antara Bhardwaj (associate); Sarita Khurana; Smriti Mundhra; Jennifer Tiexiera
- Cinematography: Naiti Gámez; Shivani Khattar; André de Alencar Lyon
- Edited by: Jennifer Tiexiera
- Music by: Saul Simon MacWilliams; Gingger Shankar
- Production company: The Marriage Brokers
- Distributed by: Collective Eye Films
- Release date: 22 April 2017
- Running time: 90 minutes

A Suitable Girl is a 2017 documentary film directed by Sarita Khurana and Smriti Mundhra. The film was screened at SAWCC on 7 April 2017 before premiering on 22 April at the Tribeca Film Festival, winning the Albert Maysles New Documentary Director Award. Khurana and Mundra were the first Desi women to earn the New Documentary Director Award. The film has also been screened at the British Film Institute Festival, Mumbai Film Festival, AFI Docs, Amazon and Netflix. In 2018, Library Journal reviewed and recommended the film be included in library collections.

== Synopsis ==
A Suitable Girl follows three young women in India as they struggle to follow their dreams amid familial and cultural pressures to get married. Ritu, Dipti and Amrita are educated, financially stable contemporary middle-class women living in Mumbai and New Delhi. Yet their lives take a dramatic turn when the pressure to settle down and get married hits. Documenting the matchmaking process in vérité over four years, A Suitable Girl examines the complex relationships among marriage, family, and culture.

== Cast ==
- Dipti Admane, a 29-year-old schoolteacher who lives with her parents near Mumbai.
- Amrita Jhanwar, a party and career girl in her mid-20s living in New Delhi.
- Ritu Taparia, a 24-year-old who works in Mumbai's financial district.
- Sima Taparia, a matchmaker and the mother of Ritu. She would later appear as the host of Mundhra's next project, Indian Matchmaking.

== Production ==
A Suitable Girl was co-directed by Sarita Khurana and Smriti Mundhra. They met in film school at Columbia University School of the Arts connecting over their similar Indian backgrounds and wanted to create a film that explored the complexities of arranged marriages. They followed Dipti, Amrita, and Ritu over four years as they navigated their daily lives, careers, families, and friends.

== Reception ==
The film received generally positive reviews. On Rotten Tomatoes the film has an approval rating of 88%, based on 16 reviews. Many praised the film for having an unbiased look at the marriage customs in India.

Frank Sheck of The Hollywood Reporter praised the film for examining "the difficulties women face in Indian society," as well as having "engaging personalities of its subjects and their families." Nick Schager of Variety called the film "a stark look at that country's ongoing clash between modernity and tradition when it comes to female independence (or lack thereof)." Barbara Shulgasser-Parker of Common Sense Media gave the film a 3/5 rating, stating that it "wisely tells its absorbing story without narration."

Roger Moore of Movie Nation gave the movie a 2.5/4 rating, calling it "a fascinating look into a custom that the movies and TV have only touched on and mentioned with a raised eyebrow of mild dismissal." Paul Parcellin of Film Threat gave the film an 8.5/10, saying that the film was an "honest look at a world that might be quite foreign to many of us," praising its "clear-eyed, unbiased look" at the topic of marriage.

Nathaniel Hood of The Young Folks gave the movie a 5/10, saying that the film "seems to argue that the whole process of parental matchmaking is an endurable hassle that inevitably leads to happy marriages." Wendy Ide of Screen Daily criticized the film, saying that the film provides little insight of a "vast and complex subject."

== Awards and nominations ==
Tribeca Film Festival
Award	Date of ceremony	Category	Recipient(s)	Result	Ref.
Albert Maysles New Documentary Director Award	6 February 2017	Best New Documentary Filmmaker	Sarita Khurana, Smriti Mundhra	Won	
Best Editing	6 February 2017	Best Editing in a Documentary Film	Jennifer Tiexiera	Nominated	
Best Editing	6 February 2017	Best Editing in a Documentary Feature Film	Jennifer Tiexiera	Nominated	
Jury Award	6 February 2017	Best Documentary Feature	Sarita Khurana, Smriti Mundhra	Nominated	
