= 17 Blocks =

- Official poster
- Directed by: Davy Rothbart
- Written by: Davy Rothbart; Jennifer Tiexiera
- Produced by: Michael B. Clark; Alex Turtletaub; Marc Turtletaub; Rachel Dengiz
- Cinematography: Zachary Shields
- Edited by: Jennifer Tiexiera
- Music by: Nick Urata
- Production companies: Beachside Films; Bunny Lake Films; 21 Balloons Productions
- Distributed by: MTV Documentary Films
- Release dates: April 27, 2019 (Tribeca); February 19, 2021 (United States)
- Running time: 98 minutes
- Country: United States
- Language: English

17 Blocks is a 2019 American documentary film, directed by Davy Rothbart, written by Rothbart and Jennifer Tiexiera. The film revolves around the Sanford family, who spent 20 years filming themselves.

The film had its world premiere at the Tribeca Film Festival on April 27, 2019. It was released in virtual cinema on February 19, 2021, by MTV Documentary Films.

== Synopsis ==
The film follows the Sanford family, who spent 20 years filming themselves, living just 20 minutes away from the White House.

== Release ==
The film had its world premiere at the Tribeca Film Festival on April 27, 2019. The film also screened at AFI Docs on June 20, 2019. In July 2019, MTV Documentary Films acquired distribution rights to the film. The film was released in virtual cinema on February 19, 2021.

== Reception ==
17 Blocks received positive reviews from film critics. It holds a 100% approval rating on review aggregator website Rotten Tomatoes, based on 27 reviews, with an average of 8.4/10. On Metacritic, the film holds a rating of 79 out of 100, based on 6 critics, indicating "generally favorable" reviews.
