= I Am Ready, Warden =

2024 documentary short film by Smriti Mundhra

- Official poster
- Directed by: Smriti Mundhra
- Produced by: Smriti Mundhra; Maya Gnyp; Nina Aujla; Keri Blakinger
- Starring: John Henry Ramirez
- Cinematography: Rafael Roy
- Edited by: Jennifer Tiexiera; Dan Sadowsky
- Music by: Amanda Jones
- Production companies: MTV Documentary Films; Meralta Films
- Distributed by: Paramount+
- Release date: February 21, 2024 (Big Sky)
- Running time: 37 minutes
- Country: United States
- Language: English

I Am Ready, Warden is a 2024 American documentary short film produced and directed by Smriti Mundhra. The film documents the final days of Texas death row inmate John Henry Ramirez before his execution. It had its world premiere at the Big Sky Documentary Film Festival on February 21, 2024. On January 23, 2025, it was nominated for the Best Documentary Short Film at the 97th Academy Awards.

== Synopsis ==
The film recounts the emotionally charged story of John Henry Ramirez, who was convicted of murder and sentenced to death in 2008.

== Cast ==
- John Henry Ramirez
- Aaron Castro
- Jan Trujillo
- Mark Gonzalez
- Israel A. Ramirez
- Pastor Dana Moore

== Release ==
I Am Ready, Warden had its world premiere in Best Short Competition, at the Big Sky Documentary Film Festival on February 21, 2024.

It was also presented in the Oscar qualifying program in 'Shifting Perspectives' section of the Bend Film Festival on October 10, 2024, and on October 21 in the 33rd Hot Springs Documentary Film Festival in Hot Springs, Arkansas. On October 20, it was presented in the 25th Woodstock Film Festival as special event. In December 2024, it was shortlisted for the Best Documentary Short Film at the 97th Academy Awards.

The film was showcased at the Doc NYC on November 16, 2024, in the Shorts Precious Life programme.

The film was made available for streaming on Paramount+ on November 22, 2024. It was made available for free at more than 250 United States law schools from January 11 to January 18, 2025.

== Accolades ==
Award	Date	Category	Recipient	Result	Ref.
Bend Film Festival	October 12, 2024	Best Documentary Short	I Am Ready, Warden	Won	
Critics' Choice Documentary Awards	November 10, 2024	Best Short Documentary	I Am Ready, Warden	Nominated	
Cinema Eye Honors	January 9, 2025	Outstanding Non-Fiction Short	I Am Ready, Warden	Shortlisted	
Academy Awards	March 2, 2025	Best Documentary Short Film	I Am Ready, Warden	Nominated	

== See also ==
- Academy Award for Best Documentary Short Film
- Submissions for Best Documentary Short Academy Award
