= James Morris (Missouri politician) =

American politician (born 1962)

Member of the Missouri House of Representatives from the 58th district
- In office 2009–2011
- Succeeded by: Penny Hubbard

Personal details
- Born: February 8, 1962 (age 64)
- Party: Democratic

James Morris (born February 8, 1962) is an American politician. He was member of the Missouri House of Representatives for the 58th district.
