= Indian Matchmaking =

2020 Indian reality television show

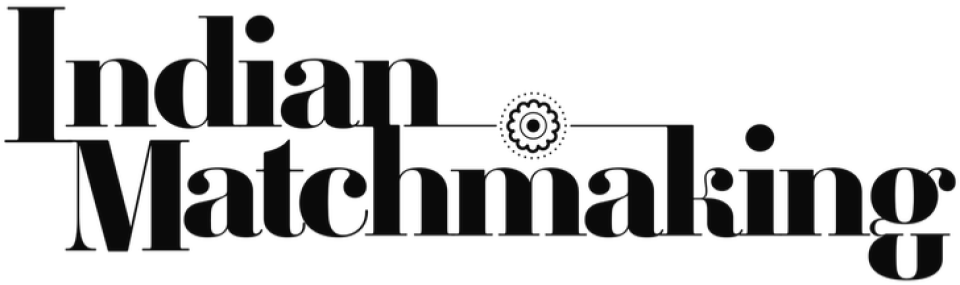
- Genre: Reality television
- Created by: Smriti Mundhra
- Presented by: Sima Taparia
- Countries of origin: India; United Kingdom; United States
- Original languages: English; Hindi
- No. of seasons: 3
- No. of episodes: 24

Production
- Executive producers: Eli Holzman; Aaron Saidman; Smriti Mundhra; J.C. Begley
- Running time: 26–42 minutes
- Production company: The Intellectual Property Corporation

Original release
- Network: Netflix
- Release: 16 July 2020 – present

Indian Matchmaking is a 2020 Indian reality television series produced by Smriti Mundhra that premiered on Netflix on 16 July 2020. In August 2021, Netflix renewed the series for a second season. In March 2022, Netflix renewed the series for a third season, which premiered in April 2023.

== Cast ==
- Sima Taparia, a marriage consultant from Mumbai who uses preferences from the people, their parents, and her years of matchmaking experience. She previously appeared on Mundhra's A Suitable Girl.

Name	Age	Job	City	Seasons		
Name	Age	Job	City	1	2	3
Aparna Shewakramani	34	attorney and general counsel	Houston	Main		
Pradhyuman Maloo (sometimes referred as Pradhyumn)	30	jeweler	Mumbai	Main		
Nadia Christina Jagessar	33	event planner who runs her own company, Euphoria Events, and works as a marketer for Givaudan	New Jersey	Main		
Vyasar Ganesan	30	teacher, college counsellor, and writer	Austin	Main		
Akshay Jakhete	36	businessman	Mumbai	Main		
Ankita Bansal	30	businesswoman in garment e-commerce	Delhi	Main		
Rupam Kaur			Denver	Main		

=== Supporting cast ===
- Shekar Jayaraman, a 34-year old Chicago attorney and entrepreneur.
- Jay Wadhwani, a 35-year old entrepreneur and product manager from Atlanta.
- Rashi Gupta, a 27-year old small & exotic animal veterinarian from Los Angeles.

== Release ==
Indian Matchmaking first aired on 16 July 2020, on Netflix.

== Episodes ==
Series overview
Series	Episodes	Originally released
1	8	16 July 2020
2	8	10 August 2022
3	8	21 April 2023

=== Season 1 (2020) ===
No. overall	No. in season	Title	Original release date
1	1	"Slim, Trim and Educated"	16 July 2020
Sima meets three unlucky-in-love clients: a stubborn Houston lawyer, a picky Mumbai bachelor and a misunderstood Morris Plains, N.J., event planner.
2	2	"Just Find Me Someone!"	16 July 2020
Nadia's and Aparna’s dates have mixed results. Friends and family get honest with Pradhyuman. Sima consults a face reader for clarity on her clients.
3	3	"I’m Trying My Best!"	16 July 2020
A setback with Vinay temporarily discourages Nadia. Sima offers two more prospects to Aparna. Feeling the pressure, Pradhyuman finally goes on a date.
4	4	"I Want to See You Again"	16 July 2020
Nadia has a promising date. Pradhyuman sees a life coach. Sima sends Aparna to an astrologer and seeks a cultural match for guidance counselor Vyasar.
5	5	"Take the Elephant out of the Room"	16 July 2020
A date with a model uplifts Pradhyuman. As Aparna’s luck seems to turn, Vyasar hits a snag. Akshay’s mother insists that he marry within the year.
6	6	"It’s High Time"	16 July 2020
Vyasar and Rashi instantly bond. As Akshay rejects over 70 matches, Preeti gives him an ultimatum. Progressive Ankita looks for an equal partnership.
7	7	"Marriages Are Breaking like Biscuits"	16 July 2020
Sima faces a challenge with single mother Rupam. A discovery about her match bothers Ankita. Vyasar frets over revealing his father’s past to Rashi.
8	8	"Adjustment and Compromise"	16 July 2020
Akshay makes a decision while a new path emerges for Rupam. Ankita has an empowering realization. As her clients move on, Sima’s work never stops.

=== Season 2 (2022) ===
No. overall	No. in season	Title	Original release date
9	1	"I've Dated Lots of Chicks"	10 August 2022
Sima meets Akshay, a bachelor whose small-town location has hindered his search for love. Meanwhile, some of her past clients return with new hopes.
10	2	"Be a Boss, Marry a Boss, Build an Empire"	10 August 2022
Sima urges Akshay to change his thinking, and worries about Nadia and Vishal's differences. New client Viral shares her criteria for an ideal mate.
11	3	"Ovo-lacto-semi-vegetarian"	10 August 2022
Viral and Aparna each go on first dates. Concerned that his past might hamper his future, Akshay takes action. Nadia faces a surprise in California.
12	4	"I Love You Like a Friend"	10 August 2022
An old client returns — and he's not alone! Sima meets soft-spoken cardiologist Arshneel. Viral seeks a physical attraction. Aparna reflects on Daman.
13	5	"The Looks of Clint Eastwood"	10 August 2022
A date leaves Arshneel apprehensive. Aparna reaches a conclusion about her needs. Sima and new client Shital debate compromise versus settling.
14	6	"Very Chulbuli"	10 August 2022
Despite a rocky date, Viral may be smitten. Arshneel and Rinkle get off to a promising start. A charming but chatty prospect gives Shital pause.
15	7	"All The Bases Covered"	10 August 2022
After a few flat dates, Shital worries about self-sabotage. Chemistry also proves elusive for Vinesh, Sima's new client, as he meets a potential match.
16	8	"I Feel Like He's The One"	10 August 2022
Opening up to Aashay, Viral notices her softer side emerging. Still struggling to find a connection, Vinesh finally considers changing his own mindset.

=== Season 3 (2023) ===
No. overall	No. in season	Title	Original release date
17	1	"Husband-in-Waiting"	21 April 2023
In London, Priya hopes for a new start and teacher Bobby wants out of the friend zone. In New Delhi, a client returns. A happy couple ponders next steps.
18	2	"Take the Bobby"	21 April 2023
Sima meets with founders of South Asian dating apps. Bobby and Priya take a salsa class. Rushali worries a spouse will separate her from her parents.
19	3	"An ABCD"	21 April 2023
Viral meets Aashay's parents. Rushali enjoys a first date — until it hits a snag. In California, Sima urges ER doctor Vikash to rethink his criteria.
20	4	"A Top Knot Appreciator"	21 April 2023
Vikash struggles to let go of his checklist. A new prospect has Priya cautiously optimistic. A life coach helps Rushali open up.
21	5	"Is Costco a Hobby?"	21 April 2023
As Priya considers rejecting an effusive suitor, Sima pushes back. Arti seeks a match with ambition and an edge. A familiar face returns with a new glow.
22	6	"Wills and Whims and Fancies"	21 April 2023
The future looks bright for Shital and Priya. Arti begins to question Sima's outlook. Vikash and a date hit it off — but they have one big difference.
23	7	"Daddy's Little Tall Girl"	21 April 2023
Finding a match for marketing professional Pavneet may be a tall order. Through a dating app, Arti finds the spark she's seeking — but Sima is skeptical.
24	8	"Marry Me"	21 April 2023
Pavneet seeks clarity when a suitor is slow to follow up. Arti is in for a surprise. As for Sima? She remains in demand as ever.

== Production ==
=== Development ===
Series director Smriti Mundhra pitched the idea of the show to a TV producer in 2009/2010, but the show was rejected for "essentially not being white enough." She pitched the show to Netflix by showing Taparia, who "were super excited about it." She had met Taparia three years before Indian Matchmaking premiered on Netflix, when she documented the lives of other three women going through the Indian marriage process in the 2017 documentary, A Suitable Girl. Taparia's daughter was one of the young women featured.

=== Casting ===
Mundhra named the casting the biggest hurdle of the show, going through a client list of 500 families and calling to see if they were willing to be on camera. Mundhra also noted that the series initially started with about a dozen singles but some of those "fell off" during production.

== Critical reception ==
The show received mixed reviews between critics and social media users. In the year of its release, 2020, Indian Matchmaking became one of Netflix’s top 10 series, though not all viewers responded positively. Many engaged with the show through a lens of critique, describing it as “trash TV,” a “cringe binge,” or tuning in for what some called “hate-watching.” The series sparked significant discussion across the Anglophone world, generating polarized reactions due to its portrayal of arranged marriage, traditional values, and perceived reinforcement of stereotypes. Inkoo Kang of The Hollywood Reporter called the show "insightful, humorous and heartwarming," praising how it showcases the preoccupation with height and caste, as well as Taparia's matchmaking tactics. Kristen Baldwin of Entertainment Weekly gave the show a B+, stating that the show as presented in a "glossy, cosmopolitan drama, without a hint of 'look at these crazy foreigners and their kooky customs!' condescension." Joel Keller of Decider called people to stream it, saying that it "brings thousands of years of tradition into the mix, and there’s a much better chance that the matches that are made at the end of the season will last." Archi Sengupta of Techquila rated the show 4 stars out of 5, calling it "sweet and entertaining."

=== Reinforcing religion and caste segregation ===
Though the show is called Indian Matchmaking, it portrays no couples who identify as Muslim, Christian, or Dalit— communities that represent close to 40 percent of India's population. The show has also been criticised for normalizing caste based discrimination such as when matchmaker Taparia declares "In India, we have to see the caste, we have to see the height..." which Yashica Dutt of The Atlantic describes as "lump[ing] an entire social system, which assigns people to a fixed place in a hierarchy from birth, together with anodyne physical preferences." Per Dutt, in the show, caste preference is coded into harmless phrases such as "similar backgrounds," "shared communities," and "respectable families," and "the show does exactly what many upper-caste Indian families tend to do when discussing this fraught subject: It makes caste invisible." The show was also said to further endorse and promote gender stereotypes.

In addition to showing "classist" and "casteist" stereotypes, the show was criticised for whitewashing the idea of arranged marriages. Kennith Rosario of The Hindu labeled the show as "The big fat desi stereotype," saying that the characters "believe in some of the most atavistic ideals of marriage, and the show, in its glossy demeanour, endorses it." Sushri Sahu of Mashable gave the show a 2/5 on the Mash Meter, criticizing how the show is "problematic and cheesy in equal parts." In response to the criticisms, Smriti Mundhra stated that she hoped that "it will spark a lot of conversations that all of us need to be having in the South Asian community with our families – that it’ll be a jumping-off point for reflections about the things that we prioritize, and the things that we internalize.” Ravi Guru Singh, a cast member who wrote a personal piece for the Huffington Post about his appearance on episode 2 of the show, criticized the producers for misrepresenting his appearance and failing to "discuss and explore casteism, homophobia and ethnocentrism" and for the date not knowing who Alexandria Ocasio-Cortez was.

The Los Angeles Times followed up with the couples appearing on the show and reported that they are not together anymore.

== See also ==
- A Suitable Girl
