= The Anti-Job =

US musical group

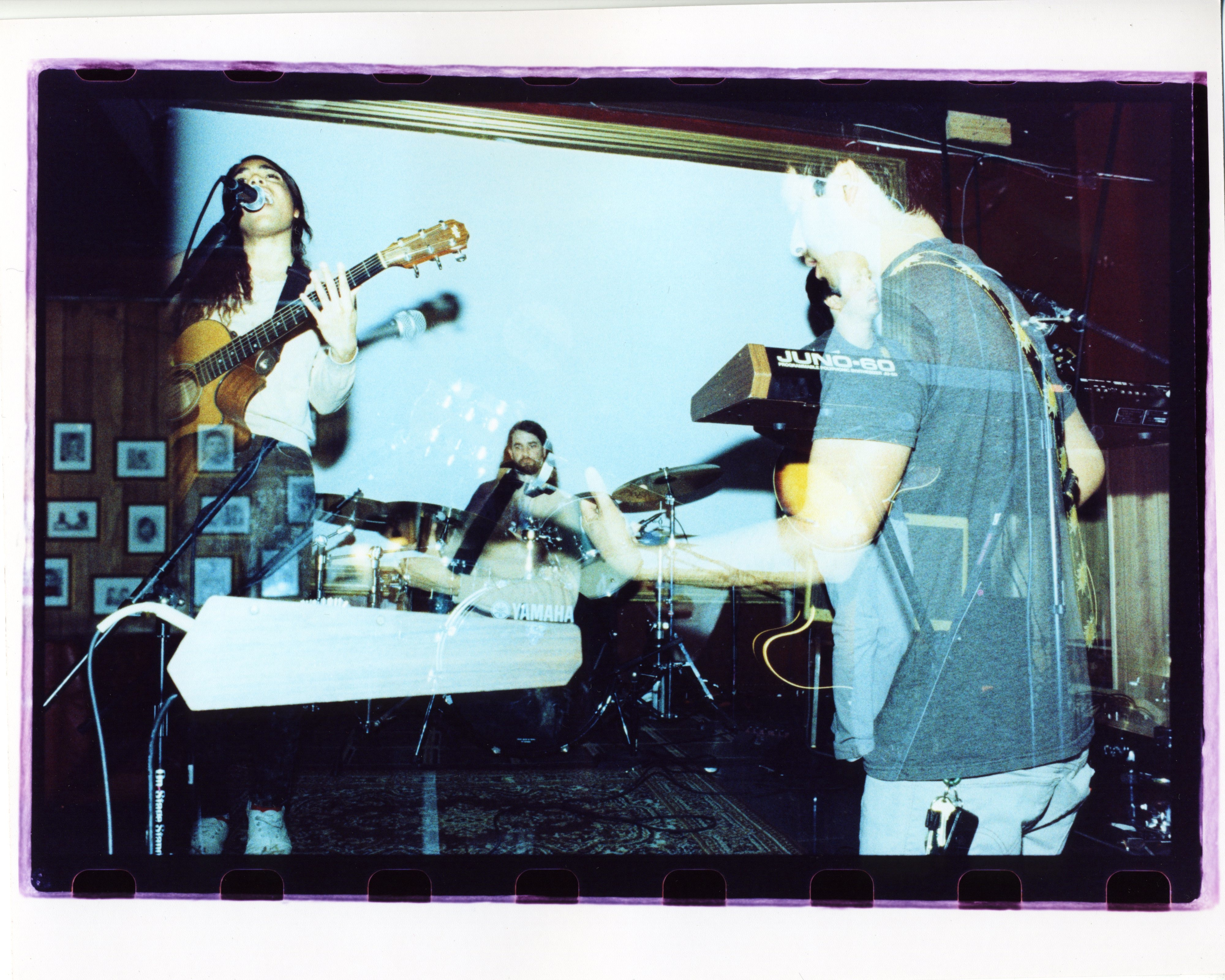
- The Anti-Job performing at Down and Out bar in Los Angeles, CA

Background information
- Origin: New York, U.S.
- Genres: indie rock, surréaliste rock, lo-fi, avant-garde, psychedelic
- Years active: 2009–present
- Label: BLOOM records
- Members: Amanda Jones; Martin Lopez-Iu; Lee Harcourt; Collaborators: Brandon Eggleston; Dawn Ho; Mike Tree
- Website: www.theanti-job.com

The Anti-Job are an American indie-avant-garde-psychedelic rock band originally from New York City. The group formed in 2009 at Vassar College. Their music offers a mixture of floral psychedelic surf rock, lyrical surrealism, electronic and folk music accented with poly-rhythms. Current members consist of Amanda Jones, Martin Lopez-Iu and Lee Harcourt. They are currently based in Los Angeles, California, signed to Bloom records.

== History ==
The Anti-Job began as an acoustic duo at Vassar College with founding members Amanda Jones and Martin Lopez-Iu. At the time the duo was called, "Amanda and Martin Incidence." In 2009 they decided to rename their project The Anti-Job and develop a more "plugged" sound. They acquired drummer/percussionist Katie Troy, another Vassar colleague and began to tour extensively all over the Hudson Valley and New York City. In 2009, The Anti-Job released their debut, EP "We Are The Anti-Job" featuring 5 tracks all self-produced and recorded after hours at the Vassar College music department, Skinner Hall.

Summer of 2010, The Anti-Job toured the East Coast and Mid-West. They traveled to 14 different cities beginning and ending in New York City. It was a successful tour but personal differences and dispute arose among the members ultimately causing drummer, Katie Troy to part ways with the band. After graduating and touring in 2010, Amanda moved to Los Angeles, California to continue writing music with Martin. From Winter of 2010 to Fall of 2011, Amanda and Martin wrote and recorded, "Bloom." "Bloom" was recorded at Martin's DIY home studio and mastered at Rye Bread Mastering Studios in Montreal, Quebec with engineer Ryan Morey (Arcade Fire, Beck, The Weakerthans, Yeah, Yeah, Yeahs). Bloom was a collaboration of a variety of musicians and concept album that paralleled the lives of the members. The content narrated a personal quest toward happiness and understanding. "Bloom" was released in March 2012 to positive reviews and acclaim.

In March 2012, The Anti-Job released their debut full-length album, "Bloom." That same month, Amanda happened to meet Henry Rollins at the LA Zine Fest and shared her music with him. Shortly thereafter Rollins began playing they're songs on his radio show via KCRW 89.9FM. Their songs remain in steady rotation. In April 2012, Martin and Amanda acquired a new drummer, Lee Harcourt. The trio make the current line-up as The Anti-Job. From April through the end of the year, The Anti-Job toured Los Angeles and the surrounding regions extensively, opening for bands like garage rockers, FIDLAR and metal experimentalists, KAYO DOT.

In July 2013, The Anti-Job recorded a 5 track EP "You're Not Real." The EP was recorded at Cloud City Sound Studios with producer / engineer Brandon Eggleston (Modest Mouse, The Mountain Goats, Tune-Yards, Sony BMG, 4AD) The EP was mastered at Golden Mastering by John Golden (Sonic Youth, Superchunk, Sub Pop, Kill Rock Stars). Anticipated release date is October 11, 2013.

== In other media ==
In 2010, after the release of their debut EP, "We Are The Anti-Job, The Anti-Job were featured on Art Rocker Magazine TV. The Anti-Job spent over a year touring and recording their next album, Bloom -– upon its release in 2012, garnered the attention of Henry Rollins, LA Record, Buzz Bands LA, the Deli Magazine Los Angeles and a variety of radio stations including, BBC radio 6, and Los Angeles stations KCRW 89.9FM, KXLU 88.9FM, KPFK 90.7FM.

In 2011, "Love Strange" from their EP "We Are The Anti-Job" was featured in the online web series, "Brooklyn Is In Love." In 2012,"Rain Dance (Part 1)" from their album, "Bloom" was featured in the trailer and pilot of the scripted drama, "DTLA" featuring actress Melanie Griffith and made by the producers of the Showtime Network series, "L Word". This song was also featured in the documentary "Anger the Intention."

== Members ==
Amanda Jones (guitar, vocals, bass, keyboard), besides being the founder and frontrunner of the band, is also a composer. In 2020 she was nominated for an Emmy for "Outstanding Composition for a Documentary Series or Special (Original Dramatic Score)" for her work on the Apple TV+ documentary Home. She also composed the Adventure Time: Distant Lands "Obsidian" soundtrack, and has been involved with How to Train Your Dragon 2, Trolls World Tour, and A Black Lady Sketch Show.

The other bandmembers are Martin Lopez-Iu (lead guitar, keyboard, bass) and Lee Harcourt (drums, percussion).

== Discography ==
=== Studio albums ===
- Bloom (2012)

=== EPs ===
- You're Not Real (2013)
- We Are The Anti-Job (2009)

=== Singles ===
- "Miss You" (2013)
- "Joni Mitchell in Love" (2013)
- "Rain Dance (Part 1)" (2012)
- "The Robbery" (2009)
