= Keri Blakinger =

American journalist (born 1984)

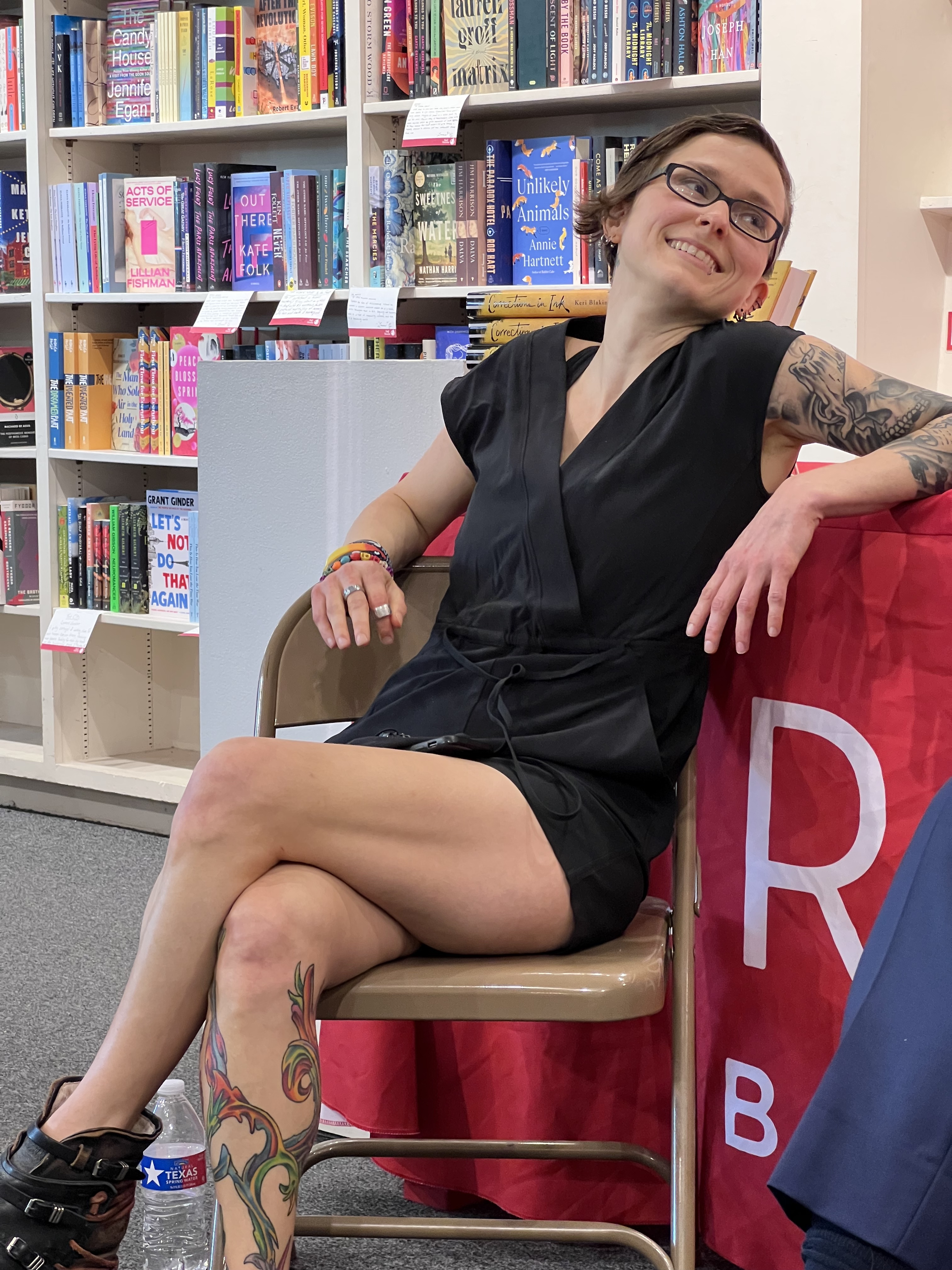
- Blakinger in June 2022
- Born: June 15, 1984 (age 42); Lancaster, Pennsylvania, U.S.
- Education: Bachelor's of English, Cornell University, 2012
- Occupation: Criminal justice journalist
- Years active: 2012–present
- Employer: ProPublica

Keri Lynn Blakinger (born June 15, 1984) is an American journalist and author. She is an investigative reporter for ProPublica, where she covers criminal justice and government corruption surrounding federal prisons. Previously, she was a reporter for the Los Angeles Times, where she investigated the Los Angeles County Sheriff's Department, and for The Marshall Project, where she covered conditions and injustices in the US prison system.

As a child, she competed as a figure skater at regional and national levels, first in singles and then in pair skating with Mark Ladwig. She struggled with bulimia during her competitions and, after her skating career ended, she developed a drug addiction in high school and college. She continued to deal with this and other problems while attending Rutgers University and later Cornell University before being arrested in December 2010 for possession of heroin. She accepted a plea deal for two and a half years in prison. The experience caused her to change her focus to journalism and trying to improve the penal system in the United States through her reporting.

Blakinger worked for a number of news outlets in the late 2010's, including the Ithaca Times, the New York Daily News, and the Houston Chronicle before joining The Marshall Project in 2019, the Los Angeles Times in 2023, and ProPublica in 2025. Her work has resulted in the charging of a prison rape perpetrator and several reforms to the prison policies regarding women and the physical and culinary options afforded inmates. In 2022, she authored a memoir, Corrections in Ink: A Memoir, in which she describes major events of her life, including her addiction, arrest, and observations on prison life, including racism she observed while incarcerated.

== Early life and education ==
=== Figure skating ===
Blakinger was born in Lancaster, Pennsylvania on June 15, 1984, to a primary school teacher mother and a lawyer father. As a child, she participated in horseback riding, piano, and gymnastics, and other activities. By third grade, she decided she wanted to be a figure skater and compete on the national level, aiming for being a member of the Olympics.

In 1993, she entered her first competition, the Hershey Open in Hershey, Pennsylvania. By sixth grade, she was commuting to larger cities for advanced coaching. In 1994, she won the gold medal at the Keystone Winter Games in the Beginner Freestyle Skating division. She practiced with the Lancaster Figure Skating Club, and placed ninth out of 90 in the 1996 South Atlantic Regionals. She was aware, however, that she couldn't compete at the singles level in the Olympics and so began looking for a partner to do pair skating. Even while she was attending a private school, Lancaster Country Day School, she was commuting to the University of Delaware to work with coach Tracey Cahill Poletis, and she ended up being paired with Mark Ladwig.

Around this time, she began suffering from bulimia to keep the lower weight she needed for competing. Blakinger and Ladwig won first place in the 2000 and 2001 competitions at the South Atlantic Regional Championships for the novice pairs division, leading her to being named to the USFSA Scholastic Honors team that same year. When the impact her eating disorder was having on her physical and mental health was discovered, she began therapy during her sophomore year of high school, which continued through her participation in the 2001 national. Her health continued to decline, and Ladwig ended their pairs partnership when she was 17, resulting in her being unable to compete for the rest of the season and ending her goal of reaching the Olympics.

=== Homelessness, addiction, and abuse ===
She then attended Harvard Summer School in Cambridge, Massachusetts, where she began using various drugs, including heroin because, she said, "I was craving the darkness". Following conflict with her parents after her return to Pennsylvania at the end of the summer, she ran away from home days after the start of her senior year of high school. Living among other homeless people in both Lancaster and Boston, she turned to sex work to support her drug addiction, and later recounted several instances of being raped, including once at knifepoint. Despite this, she attended high school while she was homeless and living in a halfway house in Scranton, Pennsylvania while taking her Advanced Placement exams. After her parents obtained the help of one of her former teachers in an effort to convince her to enter rehab, she went through a 90 day treatment center plan.

After high school, she attended Rutgers University, where she made money to pay for tuition by working at a strip club and escort agency, which allowed her to rent an apartment of her own. From her apartment, she began dealing drugs, which led her to relapse into her own drug addictions, which strained her finances and personal relationships. Despite this, she maintained a perfect grade point average at Rutgers, and was named to the dean's list in 2002, receiving the First Year Student's Award for academic excellence, and was nominated for the National Society of Collegiate Scholars.

In January 2007, she was accepted as a transfer student into Cornell University. In July 2007, Blakinger attempted suicide by jumping off a bridge at Cornell, which has a history of such attempts. She survived, but broke several vertebra. She took the subsequent year off from classes to recover, during which she returned to using heroin because the medications given her offered little relief from the pain resulting from her injuries. She adopted a dog named Charlotte that she took with her everywhere, including to drug deals. Her professors noted that, while they suspected she was doing drugs and dealing with other problems, her high intelligence and outstanding work in her classes obscured anyone from actively questioning her. In 2008, she joined the staff of The Cornell Daily Sun as a copy editor and subsequently became a journalist for the newspaper.

=== Drug charges ===
During her senior year at Cornell University, Blakinger was arrested for possession of nearly six ounces ($50,000 worth) of heroin and suspended from the university in December 2010. Charged with a second-degree felony for possession of a controlled substance, she accepted a plea deal that reduced the charges to two and a half years of prison time. She was released in late 2012. She applied to return to Cornell, and was accepted. In October 2012, she graduated with a bachelor's degree in English.

In January 2015, she told The Washington Post she saw the systemic racism in the prison system and knew she had opportunities after her release, which she attributed to white privilege.

== Career ==
After being released from prison, she was contacted by a writer for the Ithaca Times that was covering what resources were given to women in prison. After noting that she had been a writer for the Cornell student paper, she was hired by the Times as a freelancer, and covered local town meetings and other events.

In August 2015, Blakinger left the Times after being hired by the New York Daily News while living in Union City, New Jersey. While working at the New York Daily News, she reported on a sexual assault of a female inmate at Rikers Island that resulted in the charging and subsequent conviction of a corrections officer.

In 2016, she became a criminal justice reporter for the Houston Chronicle, where she covered the treatment of prisoners and the issue of people incarcerated with drug addictions and mental illness. Her reporting contributed to several reforms to Texas prison policies, including allowing inmates lacking teeth to have their dentures 3D printed. An article she wrote for The Washington Post about women's prisons in California built won her a National Magazine Award.

Blakinger joined The Marshall Project at the end of 2019. A May 2020 article she wrote during the COVID-19 pandemic in the United States on prisons giving dramatically worsened food to inmates resulted in vegetables being served again. She would additionally become an investigative journalist for the Los Angeles Times in January 2023, with her writing focusing on the Los Angeles County Sheriff's Department.

Blakinger was a finalist for the 2024 Pulitzer Prize for Feature Writing for her feature "When Wizards and Orcs Came to Death Row". Her work as producer for the 2024 documentary I Am Ready, Warden, which was based around her feature article and her other articles on death row inmates, also earned her an Oscar nomination. She is a 2025 Emerson Fellow.

In September 2025, she was hired as a national investigative reporter by ProPublica alongside Raquel Rutledge. Cornell University named Blakinger as one of three Zubrow Distinguished Visiting Journalists (DVJ) for the spring 2026 semester to meet with students and faculty and give a presentation on policing and incarceration.

== Book ==
In 2022, she authored Corrections in Ink: A Memoir, a memoir on her childhood, her struggles with eating disorders, addiction, her arrest, and experiences in prison, including people she met in prison, and her subsequent release.

== Bibliography ==
- — (2022). Corrections in Ink: A Memoir. St. Martin's Publishing Group. ISBN 9781250272867.
