= The Antisocial Network (film) =

2024 film directed by Arthur Jones and Giorgio Angelini

- Directed by: Arthur Jones; Giorgio Angelini
- Produced by: Arthur Jones; Giorgio Angelini; Andrew Fried; Dane Lillegard; Jordan Wynn
- Cinematography: Alexander Paul
- Edited by: Drew Blatman; Devin Concannon; Arthur Jones; David Osit
- Music by: Martin Crane
- Release date: March 13, 2024 (SXSW)
- Running time: 85 minutes

The Antisocial Network: Memes to Mayhem (or simply The Antisocial Network) is a 2024 documentary film directed by Arthur Jones and Giorgio Angelini that explores the intersection of internet culture and real-world politics. It was released as a follow-up to Jones' previous work, Feels Good Man. The film discusses the anonymous image board 4chan, and includes interviews from anonymous hackers and ex-members of the website. The film premiered at the 2024 South by Southwest Film Festival.

== Reception ==
On review aggregator Rotten Tomatoes, 94% of 17 critics gave the film a positive review, with an average rating of 7.0/10, earning it a "Fresh" rating.

== See also ==
- 4chan
- Pepe the Frog
