= Samer Hamadeh =

American entrepreneur

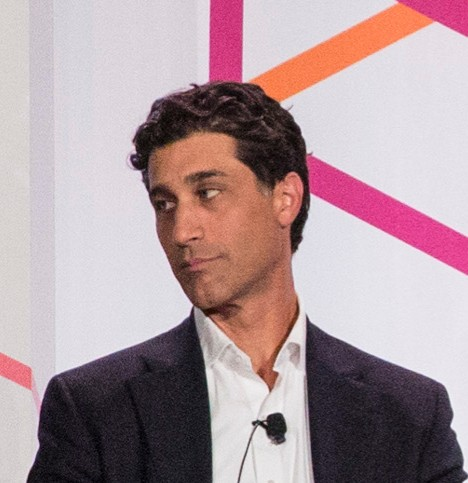
- Born: Fresno, California, USA
- Education: Stanford University
- Occupation: Entrepreneur

Samer Hamadeh is an American entrepreneur and the founder and CEO of the on-demand wellness company Zeel and co-founder and former CEO of Vault.com. The first Zeel service, Massage On Demand®, and its associated iOS and Android apps, was launched in the greater New York City area on April 2, 2013 and expanded to the San Francisco Bay Area, Los Angeles Metropolitan Area and South Florida on August 29, 2014.

== Career ==
Hamadeh began his career as an associate at the Los Angeles management consulting firm L.E.K. Consulting, where he focused on corporate and business strategy. Before that, he co-founded and managed a customized textbook printing company, worked at Chevron Corporation, and co-authored The Internship Bible and America’s Top Internships published by Random House's Princeton Review imprint.

In 1996, Hamadeh co-founded Vault.com and served as CEO until the company was sold to the New York private equity firm Veronis Suhler Stevenson in October 2007. His Vault.com co-founders were Mark Oldman and his late brother H.S. “Sam” Hamadeh.

Hamadeh sits on the board of the non-profit PeaceWorks Foundation and is or has been a board observer, angel investor and advisor in two dozen early-stage companies, including Directly, Campusfood.com (sold to GrubHub Seamless), Crunched, Splurgy, and PublicStuff (now part of Accela). Samer is also a mentor at several accelerators, including German Accelerator, Lazaridis Institute, Blueprint Health, NYCSeedStart, and First Growth Venture Network, as well as a member of Young Presidents' Organization and the Executive Board of Venture for America.

== Personal life ==
Hamadeh holds a Bachelor of Science degree in chemistry and a Master of Science degree in chemical engineering from Stanford University and is a David Rockefeller Fellow. He is a scout at Lightspeed Venture Partners, which he joined in January 2010 as an entrepreneur in residence. He is married to the American television journalist Alison Harmelin.
