= Sami Khan (filmmaker) =

Canadian filmmaker

Sami Khan is a Canadian filmmaker. He is most noted as co-director with Smriti Mundhra of the film St. Louis Superman, which was an Academy Award nominee for Best Documentary (Short Subject) at the 92nd Academy Awards in 2020.

Originally from Sarnia, Ontario, Khan attended Northern Collegiate Institute and Vocational School before studying film at Columbia University. He wrote and directed the short films The Bride, The Workout, Habibi and 75 El Camino before premiering his debut feature film Khoya in 2015. In 2020, Khan and Michael Gassert released the feature documentary film The Last Out, for which they received a special jury mention for the Albert Maysles New Documentary Director Award at the 2020 Tribeca Film Festival.

In addition to his work in film, Khan has also been a story editor on the Canadian television drama series Transplant.

In November 2020, Sarnia's South Western International Film Festival included a retrospective program of Khan's works in its lineup, due to increased local interest in his work following the Academy Award nomination.
