= South Western International Film Festival =

Former Canadian film festival (2015–2022)

The South Western International Film Festival (SWIFF) was an annual film festival in Sarnia, Ontario, staged from 2015 until 2022.

== History ==
Launched in 2015 along with the Toronto International Film Festival, the South Western International Film Festival (SWIFF) programmed a lineup of Canadian and international films in November each year, at the city's Imperial Theatre and Judith & Norman Alix Art Gallery. The inaugural festival opened with a gala screening of Into the Forest, a film by Sarnia native Patricia Rozema.

Due to the COVID-19 pandemic in Canada, the 2020 festival was staged online. The 2020 festival included a retrospective program of the work of Sami Khan, a filmmaker from Sarnia whose short documentary film St. Louis Superman was an Academy Award nominee for Best Documentary (Short Subject) at the 92nd Academy Awards.

The festival's longtime executive director was Ravi Srinivasan, until his death in January 2023. He was also an associate programmer with the Toronto International Film Festival, specializing in South Asian and Philippine films. His death resulted in the festival cancelling the 2023 edition, stating that Srinivasan's wider industry connections had been too essential to the festival's operations for it to continue without him.
