= Stephen Harmelin =

American lawyer (1939–2025)

White House Director of Speechwriting
- In office 1964–1965
- President: Lyndon B. Johnson
- Preceded by: Position established
- Succeeded by: Harry McPherson (1967)

Personal details
- Born: Stephen Joseph Harmelin; May 7, 1939 Philadelphia, Pennsylvania, U.S.
- Died: May 3, 2025 (aged 85) Philadelphia, Pennsylvania, U.S.
- Party: Republican
- Spouse: Julia Harmelin
- Children: 3, including Alison
- Education: University of Pennsylvania (BA); Harvard University (JD)

Military service
- Allegiance: United States
- Branch: United States Coast Guard

Stephen Joseph Harmelin (May 7, 1939 – May 3, 2025) was an American lawyer who specialized in corporate and transactional law. He was the co-chairman of the Philadelphia-based law firm Dilworth Paxson LLP. He also served as the White House Director of Speechwriting and as a White House aide for President Lyndon B. Johnson from 1964 to 1965.

== Early life and education ==
Harmelin was born on May 7, 1939, into a Jewish family in Philadelphia, Pennsylvania. Harmelin attended Central High School. He later went on to graduate from the University of Pennsylvania and Harvard Law School. He served in the United States Coast Guard.

== Career ==
From 1964 to 1965, Harmelin served as the White House Director of Speechwriting and as a White House aide to President Lyndon B. Johnson. Johnson tasked Harmelin with the creation of the White House Fellows program. He joined Dilworth Paxson LLP in 1965 and worked under former Philadelphia Mayor Richardson Dilworth. In 1970, Harmelin briefly left Dilworth Paxson and served as a Special Philadelphia Assistant District Attorney under Arlen Specter.

In 1989, Harmelin was appointed by Pennsylvania Governor, Bob Casey Sr. as a Commissioner on the Board of the Pennsylvania Convention Center Authority. He served in that role until 2002. In 1992, he served as General Counsel for the Legislative Reapportionment Commission on behalf of the Pennsylvania State Senate and the Pennsylvania General Assembly. From 2007 to 2008, he worked as the receiver ad litem for the Commodity Futures Trading Commission and recovered $170 million, the largest in the commission's history. He also served as a member of the Third Circuit Court of Appeals Task Force to select counsel in certain lawsuits. He retired from Dilworth Paxson in 2019.

Harmelin served as General Counsel to the National Constitution Center. Harmelin was awarded the Replansky Award by the Philadelphia Bar Association Corporate Law Committee for distinguished accomplishments in civics, law, and professionalism. He also sat on the National Constitution Center's Board of Trustees from the center's opening in 2000.

== Personal life ==
Harmelin was the founder of the Philadelphia Constitution Foundation, where he led a project to bring the original copy of the Magna Carta to Philadelphia in 1987 as a way to commemorate the U.S. Constitution's 200th anniversary, and then again in 2001. He also sat on the boards of the Barnes Foundation, the Atlantic Legal Foundation, the College of Physicians of Philadelphia, and The Philadelphia Inquirer. He appeared in the History Channel show Save Our History where he spoke about the National Constitution Center. Harmelin helped draft the Russian Federation's Constitution, which was enacted in 1993. In 2013, Harmelin led a project to return Pennsylvania's original copy of the Bill of Rights, which was held in the New York Public Library. He arranged an agreement with the library that allowed the copy to be shared between the library and the state of Pennsylvania for 100 years. According to Jeffrey Rosen, who serves as the president and CEO of the National Constitution Center, "[there is] no one else in American history who's responsible for restoring two original copies of the Bill of Rights to their owners."

Harmelin was close friends with former longtime Pennsylvania Senator, Arlen Specter. He served as the Treasurer for Specter's successful re-election campaign in 2004.

Stephen Harmelin died from Parkinson's disease at home in Society Hill, on May 3, 2025, four days before his 86th birthday.
