= The Winemakers =

- Genre: Reality television
- Directed by: Kevin Whelan
- Presented by: Brian von Dedenroth
- Judges: Mark Oldman
- Country of origin: United States
- Original language: English
- No. of seasons: 2
- No. of episodes: 14

Production
- Producer: Lisa Hepner
- Production company: Free Run Productions

Original release
- Network: PBS
- Release: October 2009 – present

The Winemakers is a reality television series that followed twelve winemakers competing to create and market a wine. It was broadcast on Public Broadcasting Service (PBS) and was the channel's only competitive reality series. Season 1 took place in Paso Robles, California. Season 2 was shot in the Rhone Valley of France and aired on PBS in the fall of 2011.
