= Smriti Mundhra =

American film director and producer (born 1980)

- Born: July 3, 1980 (age 46); Los Angeles, California
- Education: Columbia University School of the Arts; California State University, Northridge
- Occupations: Director; producer
- Notable work: St. Louis Superman; A Suitable Girl; Indian Matchmaking
- Spouse: Christian Magalhaes
- Father: Jag Mundhra

Smriti Mundhra (born July 3, 1980) is an American filmmaker based in Los Angeles. Her production company, Meralta Films, specializes in documentary films and non-fiction content.

Mundhra won the Albert Maysles New Documentary Director Award at the 2017 Tribeca Film Festival for her first feature documentary film A Suitable Girl, along with her co-director Sarita Khurana. Mundhra is also the executive producer and creator of Netflix's original reality TV series, Indian Matchmaking.

In 2020, she was nominated for the Academy Award for Best Documentary Short Subject for her film St. Louis Superman (2019). She was nominated in the same category in 2025 for I Am Ready, Warden.

She directed the Netflix documentary series, The Romantics. The four-part series explores the impact of Yash Chopra, his son Aditya Chopra, and their company Yash Raj Films on Hindi Cinema.

== Biography ==
=== Early life and education ===
Mundhra was born in Los Angeles, California and raised between Los Angeles and Mumbai, India. Her father, Jag Mundhra was also a filmmaker. Before she was born, her parents rented a single screen in Culver City, Los Angeles and became the first exhibitors of Bollywood films in the United States.

Mundhra obtained a Bachelor of Arts (BA) degree in English from California State University, Northridge and Masters of Fine Arts (MFA) degree in film at the Columbia University School of the Arts in 2010. Then, Mundhra moved to Mumbai to begin production on her documentary directorial debut film, A Suitable Girl.

=== Career ===
Mundhra started working in films in her teenage years. She was a production secretary on the Coen Brothers' The Man Who Wasn't There and O Brother, Where Art Thou? as well as Spike Jonze's Being John Malkovich. She also served as the production assistant on Neil LaBute's Nurse Betty.

Then, she went on to produce Bomb the System starring Mark Webber that was nominated for an Independent Spirit Award for the Best First Feature award. In 2005, she produced Waterborne about three sets of residents who band together after a terrorist attack against LA's water supply. Waterborne received the Special Audience Award at the SXSW Film Festival that year. After Waterborne, Mundhra produced Tanuj Chopra's Punching At the Sun. Punching At the Sun premiered at the 2006 Sundance Film Festival, was an official selection at the Tribeca Film Festival and won the Grand Jury Prize at the San Francisco International Asian American Film Festival.

Immediately after graduating from Columbia University, Mundhra, along with fellow Columbia alumna Sarita Khurana, moved to Mumbai to begin filming A Suitable Girl. The film premiered at the Tribeca Film Festival in 2017.

In 2018, she directed an ad campaign for Bumble's launch in India starring Priyanka Chopra called "Equal Not Loose". Mundhra was named DOC NYC's 40 Under 40 Filmmakers.

Mundhra directed and produced St. Louis Superman, a short documentary, with Sami Khan. The film, produced by Mundhra, Khan and Poh Si Teng, follows former Ferguson activist, battle rapper and state representative Bruce Franks Jr. as he tries to pass a critical bill for his community. It was commissioned by Al Jazeera English and premiered at the Tribeca Film Festival in 2019 where it was awarded the Special Jury Mention. It became the first short documentary acquired by MTV's new documentary banner, MTV Documentary Films, helmed by Sheila Nevins.

In 2020, St. Louis Superman was nominated for the 92nd Academy Award in the category of Best Documentary Short Film.

Mundhra is also the executive producer and creator of Netflix's original reality TV series, Indian Matchmaking.

== Personal life ==
Mundhra is married to Emmy-nominated screenwriter, Christian Magalhaes and they live in Los Angeles, California with their two children.

== Filmography ==
- A Suitable Girl (2017)
- St. Louis Superman (2019)
- The Romantics (documentary, 2023) — director
- I Am Ready, Warden (2024)
