= Jennifer Tiexiera =

American documentary filmmaker

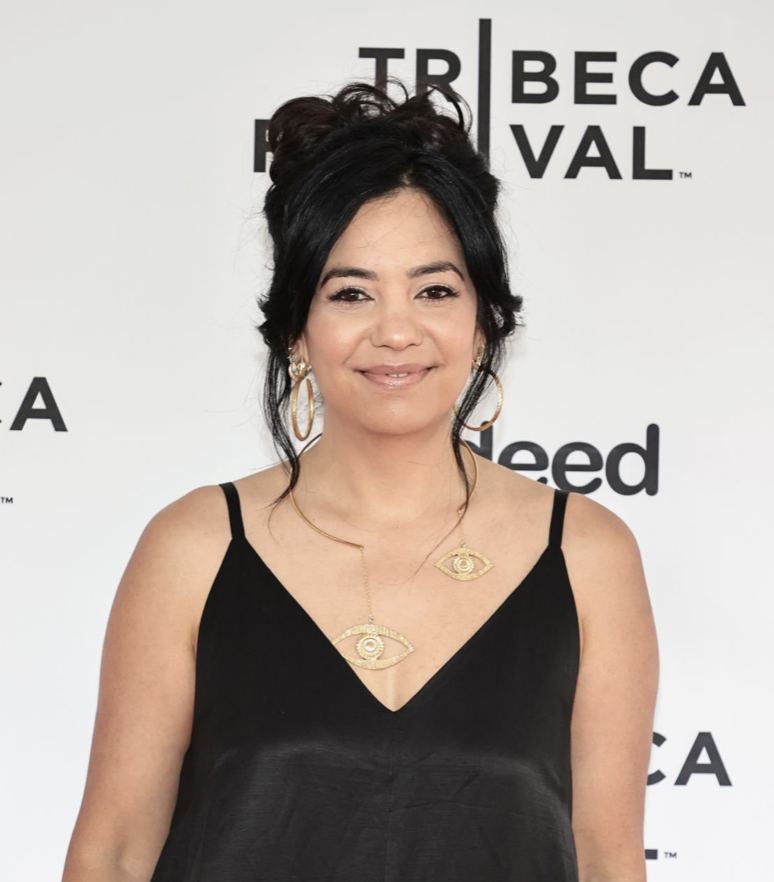
- Born: Oakland, California, U.S.
- Occupation: Filmmaker
- Years active: 2005–present

Jennifer Tiexiera is an American documentary filmmaker. She is known for directing the films P.S. Burn This Letter Please, Subject and Speak.

== Career ==
Tiexiera's editorial debut feature documentary, I Trust You to Kill Me, was originally broadcast on Sky One in 2006. She was nominated for Sports Emmy Awards in 2012, for her work on The Marinovich Project. She edited and produced VR documentaries ZIKR: A Sufi Revival and The Day the World Changed. She is a member of the International Documentary Association and Film Fatales.

In 2019, Tiexiera wrote, edited and produced, 17 Blocks, for which she won best editing at the Tribeca Festival. In 2020, she co-directed the feature documentary, P.S. Burn This Letter Please, along with Michael Seligman, which won the audience award at Outfest. In 2022, she co-directed Subject, along with Camilla Hall, which premiered and was nominated for best documentary at the Tribeca Film Festival. She also directed the HBO documentary series Unveiled: Surviving La Luz Del Mundo in 2022, It was nominated for a News and Documentary Emmy Awards in the category of Outstanding Crime and Justice Documentary in 2023.

Tiexiera directed, produced and edited Speak, which premiered and was nominated for the U.S. Documentary Competition at the Sundance Film Festival in 2025.

== Selected filmography ==
Year	Title	Writer	Director	Producer	Note
2025	Speak		✓	✓	Documentary
2022	Unveiled: Surviving La Luz Del Mundo		✓		3 episodes
2022	Subject	✓	✓	✓	Documentary
2022	Sirens			✓	Documentary
2020	P.S. Burn This Letter Please	✓	✓	✓	Documentary
2019	17 Blocks	✓			Documentary
2018	The Day the World Changed			✓	Documentary
2018	ZIKR: A Sufi Revival			✓	Documentary
2017	Waiting for Hassana			✓	Documentary
2017	A Suitable Girl	✓		✓	Documentary

As Editor

- 2025 – Speak
- 2024 – Omnivore
- 2024 – I Am Ready, Warden
- 2022 – Sirens
- 2022 – Mija
- 2021 – All These Sons
- 2020 – P.S. Burn This Letter Please
- 2019 – 17 Blocks
- 2018 – Afghan Cycles
- 2018 – The Day the World Changed
- 2017 – Biggie: The Life of Notorious B.I.G.
- 2017 – Believer with Reza Aslan
- 2017 – A Suitable Girl
- 2015 – Salam Neighbor
- 2014 – Road to Paloma
- 2013 – Eyewitness War
- 2012 – Behind the Music
- 2012 – The Marinovich Project
- 2011 – Off Limits
- 2011 – Dragonslayer
- 2008-2009 – Cities of the Underworld
- 2007 – Destination Truth
- 2006 – I Trust You to Kill Me

== Awards and nominations ==
Year	Result	Award	Category	Work	Ref.
2025	Nominated	Sundance Film Festival	U.S. Documentary Competition	Speak	
2023	Nominated	News and Documentary Emmy Awards	Outstanding Crime and Justice Documentary	Unveiled: Surviving La Luz Del Mundo	
2023	Won	Thin Line Fest	Documentary Impact Award	Subject	
2023	Nominated	Cleveland International Film Festival	Ad Hoc Docs Competition	Subject	
2023	Nominated	Palm Springs International Film Festival	Best Documentary	Subject	
2022	Nominated	Calgary International Film Festival	Best International Documentary	Subject	
2022	Nominated	Tribeca Festival	Best Documentary Feature	Subject	
2021	Nominated	Tribeca Festival	Best Editing in a Documentary Feature Film	All These Sons	
2021	Nominated	Cleveland International Film Festival	Ad Hoc Docs Competition	P.S. Burn This Letter Please	
2020	Won	Outfest	Documentary Feature	P.S. Burn This Letter Please	
2020	Nominated	Tribeca Festival	Albert Maysles New Documentary Director Award	P.S. Burn This Letter Please	
2020	Nominated	Cinema Eye Honors	Outstanding Achievement in Editing	17 Blocks	
2019	Won	Woodstock Film Festival	James Lyons Editing Award For Documentary Feature	17 Blocks	
2019	Won	Woodstock Film Festival	Best Editing of a Feature Documentary	17 Blocks	
2019	Won	Tribeca Festival	Best Editing in a Documentary Film	17 Blocks	
2017	Nominated	Tribeca Festival	Best Editing in a Documentary Film	A Suitable Girl	
2012	Nominated	Sports Emmy Awards	Outstanding Achievement in Editing	The Marinovich Project	
2012	Nominated	Cinema Eye Honors	Outstanding Achievement in Editing	Dragonslayer	
2011	Nominated	South by Southwest	Best Editing in a Documentary Feature Film	Dragonslayer	
