= Penny Hubbard =

American politician (born 1953)

Member of the Missouri House of Representatives from the 24th district
- In office 2011–2017
- Preceded by: James Morris
- Succeeded by: Bruce Franks Jr.

Personal details
- Born: October 26, 1953 (age 72) St. Louis, Missouri, U.S.
- Party: Democratic
- Spouse: Rodney
- Children: 4

Penny Hubbard (born October 26, 1953) is an American politician. She is a former Democratic member of the Missouri House of Representatives, representing District 78 from 2011 to 2017. She is a member of the Democratic party.
