= Ed Limato =

American talent agent

- Born: Edward Frank Limato; July 10, 1936; Mount Vernon, New York
- Died: July 3, 2010 (aged 73); Beverly Hills, California
- Occupation: Talent agent
- Years active: 1966–2010

Edward Frank Limato (July 10, 1936 – July 3, 2010) was an American talent agent and a senior vice president at the William Morris Agency, representing clients such as Michelle Pfeiffer, Nicolas Cage, Mel Gibson, Steve Martin, Diana Ross, Richard Gere, Antonio Banderas and Denzel Washington. Before coming to WMA, Limato was a partner and co-president at International Creative Management for more than a decade, from 1988 to 1999.

== Life and career ==
Limato grew up in a working-class Italian family in Mount Vernon, New York. He worked as a disc jockey and traveled to Europe, where he got a job as assistant to Franco Zeffirelli. Zeffirelli's agent helped Limato get a mailroom job at Ashley-Famous Agency in New York. That agency eventually merged to become International Creative Management (ICM).

Limato transferred to Los Angeles, and he eventually moved to the William Morris Agency. He later returned to ICM, rising to co-president. He sued ICM in 2007 after they tried to move him to an emeritus position. Limato prevailed in the case and returned to William Morris with his clients.

Limato was on the board of directors at Abercrombie & Fitch. He also served on the boards of the Los Angeles Conservancy, American Cinematheque, and the Motion Picture and Television Fund. Limato died of emphysema complicated by pneumonia in his home in 2010, just one week short of his 74th birthday.

== Legacy ==
Both the 2010 film Unstoppable and the 2012 film Flight include dedications to Limato. Both are Denzel Washington films.

The 2020 documentary P.S. Burn This Letter Please is based on a cache of hundreds of letters written to Limato, using his earlier radio presenter air name Reno Martin, and unearthed in a Los Angeles storage unit in 2014. The letters, dating back to the 1950s, are from some of Limato's closest friends, many of whom were drag queens in New York City. The letters represent "important written documents for drag queen history since most of these types of letters were destroyed out of fear."
