= Alison Harmelin =

American journalist

- Born: Philadelphia, Pennsylvania, USA
- Education: University of Southern California; Paris-Sorbonne University
- Occupation: News anchor
- Relatives: Stephen Harmelin (father)

Alison Harmelin is an American journalist and businesswoman who is the co-founder and chief brand officer at Zeel.com, an on-demand in-home health & wellness company. Prior to Zeel, from 2005 to 2015, she was an American television journalist for CBS News based in New York City. Harmelin last served as a fill-in anchor for CBS News Up-to-the-Minute and also served as a fill-in anchor for the CBS Morning News and CBSN. Harmelin was also a correspondent for CBS Newspath, the network's 24-hour daily news service, anchor and reporter for CBS MoneyWatch, and frequent contributor to CBS Radio News and CBSNews.com.

== Career ==
Harmelin covered breaking news for more than a decade, including Hurricane Sandy, the aftermath of the September 11 attacks and the disappearance of Malaysia Airlines Flight 370. She reported live from New Orleans during and after Hurricane Katrina. She covered the Collapse of Bear Stearns in 2008 and the impact of the Great Recession on the American people.

Harmelin began her career at NBC News in London, has covered the White House and the Supreme Court in Washington D.C., and worked as a local anchor and reporter at television stations in central Pennsylvania and Philadelphia before moving to New York City. Prior to her work in television, Harmelin clerked for a Los Angeles-based law firm. She later worked for then District Attorney of Philadelphia, Lynne Abraham.

== Personal life ==
Harmelin was born and raised in Philadelphia. Her father is Stephen Harmelin, the former White House Director of Speechwriting and a former White House Aide to Lyndon B. Johnson from 1964 to 1965. She graduated with honors from the University of Southern California and attended the Paris-Sorbonne University.

Harmelin sits on the committee for New Yorkers for Children (in foster care), and once served as a board member for the Alliance for Lupus Research. She is married to entrepreneur and investor, Samer Hamadeh.
