= St. Louis Workers' Education Society =

Non-profit organization in St. Louis, Missouri, US

The Saint Louis Workers' Education Society
- Abbreviation: WES
- Formation: 2014; 12 years ago Saint Louis, Missouri, U.S.
- Type: Non-Profit
- Legal status: Active
- Headquarters: St. Louis, Missouri, U.S.
- Methods: Education, Activism
- Field: Labor rights
- President: Tony Pecinovsky
- Website: Facebook page

The Saint Louis Workers' Education Society is a Saint Louis-based organization that focuses on labor rights, union representation, and the promotion of social justice. The WES was established in 2014. The WES provides a number of services including labor education, apprenticeships, and voter education.

== History ==
The Saint Louis Workers' Education Society was founded in 2014 and established their regional headquarters on 2929 S. Jefferson Ave., the former headquarters of The International Union of Operating Engineers's. With Tony Pecinovsky acting as president of the organization.

The WES made national news for its substantial role in opposing Missouri Proposition A, a right to work legislation that would weaken labor union powers. The WES organized a coalition of local and state labor unions and political organizations to oppose the legislation, which failed during the 2016 referendum.

President of WES, Tony Pecinovsky is currently running for alderman of the 14th ward of Saint Louis.
