= Cindy Meehl =

American documentary filmmaker

- Education: Marymount Manhattan College; The National Academy Museum and School of Fine Arts
- Known for: Director of the film Buck
- Spouse: Brian Meehl

Cindy Meehl is an American documentary filmmaker. Her first film, Buck, was released on June 17, 2011, after a successful set of showings at U.S. film festivals including the 2011 Sundance Film Festival.

== Biography ==
=== Early life ===
Cindy Meehl studied art at Marymount Manhattan College and The National Academy Museum and School of Fine Arts. Coming from a creative background in fashion and art, she ran her own label Sasha, Cindy and Phil as well as Cindy Hughes Designs in the 1980s. She designed couture evening wear that sold across the country. Her clothes were in the window at Bergdorf Goodman and were featured in film and television as well as magazines and print campaigns.

After marrying author Brian Meehl and moving to a horse farm in Redding, Connecticut, in the 1990s, Meehl began fine art painting and photography. She also raised a family and cared for her horses.

=== Film career ===
Meehl took one of her troubled horses to a Buck Brannaman clinic in Pennsylvania. As Meehl watched Brannaman lead the clinic, she thought "Everyone should know this. Everyone should know the way he teaches."

Ultimately, she worked up the courage to ask Brannaman if he would be interested in making a film about his methods. During a clinic at the McGginis Meadows Cattle & Guest Ranch in Montana, she spotted Brannaman sitting alone at lunch and approached him about doing a film. Two and a half minutes later, she had a "yes" and his phone number – and was off on a two-year journey making her first film.

Following that meeting, Meehl founded Cedar Creek Productions, LLC in 2008. She quickly hired a team of documentary producers, editors, and advisors, including Andrea Meditch, Julie Goldman, Alice Henty, and Toby Shimin. The film company has traveled from North Carolina, on to Tacoma Washington, France, Wyoming, California, Montana and Texas to film Buck Brannaman.

Filmmaking, Meehl said, is like "building a house. There are so many details down to the hinges and screws that you don’t think about. That was a surprise. There was a certain naivete, not thinking it through. It might look effortless, but it’s not."
