= P.S. Burn This Letter Please =

- Film poster
- Directed by: Michael Seligman; Jennifer Tiexiera
- Screenplay by: Michael Seligman; Jennifer Tiexiera
- Based on: Correspondence among 1950s drag queens
- Produced by: Michael Seligman; Jennifer Tiexiera; Craig Olsen
- Cinematography: Zachary Shields
- Edited by: Jennifer Tiexiera; Alex Bohs
- Music by: Jonathan Kirkscey
- Release date: April 2020 (Tribeca)
- Running time: 106 minutes
- Country: United States

P.S. Burn This Letter Please is a 2020 documentary film about gay life in New York City among 1950s drag queens. The title is taken verbatim from a letter recounting the autumn 1958 theft of 33 luxurious wigs from the Metropolitan Opera House. The film is based on a trove of correspondence found in a storage unit in 2014, and includes archival footage of cross-dressing balls.

== See also ==
- Ed Limato
- LGBT history in New York
- New York City Drag March, shown in 2017 footage at the film's conclusion
