= Speak (2025 film) =

2025 documentary film

Speak.
- Film poster
- Directed by: Jennifer Tiexiera; Guy Mossman
- Produced by: Pamela Louise Griner; Guy Mossman; Jennifer Tiexiera
- Cinematography: Guy Mossman
- Edited by: Delaney Lynch; Jennifer Tiexiera
- Music by: Osei Essed
- Production companies: Vox Pop Films; Lady & Bird Films; Schultz Family Foundation; The deNovo Initiative; Truant Pictures; World of Ha Productions
- Release dates: January 23, 2025 (Sundance); October 15, 2026
- Running time: 104 minutes
- Country: United States
- Language: English

Speak (stylized as Speak.) is a 2025 American documentary film directed by Jennifer Tiexiera and Guy Mossman. It follows five students who prepare for and participate in high school speech and debate competitions, specifically the 2024 NSDA National tournament in Des Moines, Iowa. The students' lives and speeches cover a range of topics from Anti-LGBTQ legislation to the Israeli–Palestinian conflict.

== Background ==
The project, involving Mossman at first, began development in 2020 through the COVID-19 pandemic. It was originally meant to be a series but soon pivoted to a feature film format later in 2021. By 2023, Tiexiera joined the production as Mossman's co-director:

Jen and I wanted to make a film that transcended the 'competition doc' genre in a way that felt immersive and intimate in the lives of our teenage subjects outside of competition. We dreamt of making a film that cinematically evoked a sense of adolescent wonder, whim and complexity.

== Release ==
The film debuted at the Sundance Film Festival on January 23, 2025 in the U.S. Documentary Competition.

Speak. was released on VOD and became available to stream exclusively on Documentary+ on October 15, 2026.

== Critical reception ==
On the review aggregator website Rotten Tomatoes, 100% of 15 critics' reviews are positive.

Of the five students highlighted, IndieWire wrote: "All heavy topics in their own way, each pulls at our hearts with great vigour, whether it be through tears or righteous anger." However, the reviewer noted that the film "doesn't possess the same kind of momentum that traditionally drives 'sport' docs in this vein" and found that certain aspects of competition weren't given as much attention.

The Hollywood Reporter found that it was a "pleasure" to follow the lives of the highlighted students as they navigated the trials and tribulations of debate: "By the time Speak stirringly gets to the final competition demonstrating that its subjects were well chosen, you'll be as proud of them as if they were your own children."
