= Feels Good Man =

2020 US documentary film

- Directed by: Arthur Jones
- Produced by: Giorgio Angelini; Caryn Capotosto; Arthur Jones; Aaron Wickenden
- Cinematography: Giorgio Angelini; Ben Cox; Kurt Keppeler; Guy Mossman; David Usui
- Edited by: Aaron Wickenden; Drew Blatman; Katrina Taylor
- Music by: Ari Balouzian; Ryan Hope
- Production companies: Ready Fictions; Wavelength
- Distributed by: Giant Pictures
- Release dates: January 27, 2020 (Sundance); August 28, 2020 (United States)
- Running time: 92 minutes
- Country: United States
- Language: English

Feels Good Man is a 2020 American documentary film about the Internet meme Pepe the Frog. Marking the directorial debut of Arthur Jones, the film stars artist Matt Furie, the creator of Pepe. The film follows Furie as he struggles to reclaim control of Pepe from members of the alt-right who have co-opted the image for their own purposes. The film premiered at the 2020 Sundance Film Festival and won a U.S. Documentary Special Jury Award for Emerging Filmmaker. It was also nominated in the U.S. Documentary Competition at Sundance.

== Plot ==
Pepe the Frog, a character created by Matt Furie and first featured in a comic on MySpace called Boy's Club, is one of four vicenarian postcollegiate slacker friends who live together. In one installment, Pepe is caught by one of his housemates with his pants around his ankles, urinating. Asked why, he replies, "Feels good man". The image becomes a viral Internet meme and is co-opted by the alt-right.

Furie attempts to take Pepe back from the alt-right who have turned him from a cartoon character into a symbol for hate. The film deals with the question of whether Pepe can be redeemed. The coda of the film alludes to Pepe's appropriation by pro-democracy demonstrators during the 2019–2020 Hong Kong protests.

== Development ==
Feels Good Man is the directorial debut of Arthur Jones. Jones described the film as:

The movie is really about him negotiating that uncomfortable reality for himself, [...] Matt's personal journey really makes the movie really unique that I hope a lot of people find satisfying for a lot of reasons.

Jones, who was also film editor, finished the edit two days prior to the premiere at the Sundance Film Festival. He described the editing process as a "slow-rolling panic attack", but said he was looking forward to showing the film at the festival.

== Release ==
As of early February 2020 the film was seeking distribution. It also appeared as part of PBS's Independent Lens. In October 2020, it was broadcast on BBC Four as part of its Storyville series.

== Critical response ==
On the review aggregator website Rotten Tomatoes, the film holds an approval rating of 95%, based on 81 reviews, with an average rating of 7.7/10. The website's consensus reads, "A cautionary tale on internet culture, Feels Good Man is a compelling look at an artist's journey to salvage his creation." On Metacritic, the film has a weighted average score of 79 out of 100, based on 18 critics, indicating "generally favorable" reviews.

Nick Allen of RogerEbert.com wrote: "Jones' movie is a beacon of internet literacy about a whole new language—that memes are flexible, omnipotent, and pieces of a phenomenon more powerful than their creators". Vox Media's Polygon called it "the most important political film of 2020". Nathan Matisse of Ars Technica said the film "reminds viewers time and time again of a basic communication and rhetorical studies principle: no matter the intent of someone who puts a message into the world, once it's out there, that idea/work/message/whatever no longer entirely belongs to the messenger. Some part of meaning always lies in reception."

== Awards and nominations ==
Feels Good Man won a U.S. Documentary Special Jury Award for Emerging Filmmaker at the Sundance Film Festival and won an Emmy Award in 2021 for Outstanding Research: Documentary. It was also nominated in the festival's U.S. Documentary Competition.

Awards and nominations for Feels Good Man
Award	Year	Category	Result	Ref(s).
Cleveland International Film Festival	2020	Ad Hoc Docs Competition	Nominated	
Sundance Film Festival	2020	U.S. Documentary Competition	Nominated	
Sundance Film Festival	2020	U.S. Documentary Special Jury Award for Emerging Filmmaker	Won	
Lighthouse International Film Festival	2020	Best Feature-Length Documentary	Won	
B3 BEN Award of the B3 Biennial of the Moving Image	2020	Best Documentary	Won	
