= Owned: A Tale of Two Americas =

Owned: A Tale Of Two Americas is a 2018 documentary film. The film details discrimination in the American housing market. The film was written, directed, and produced by Giorgio Angelini.
