= Burros (surname) =

Burros is a surname. Notable people with this surname include:

- Dan Burros (1937–1965), American neo-Nazi
- Marian Burros (1933–2025), American cookbook author
