= Mark Oldman =

American entrepreneur, wine expert and author

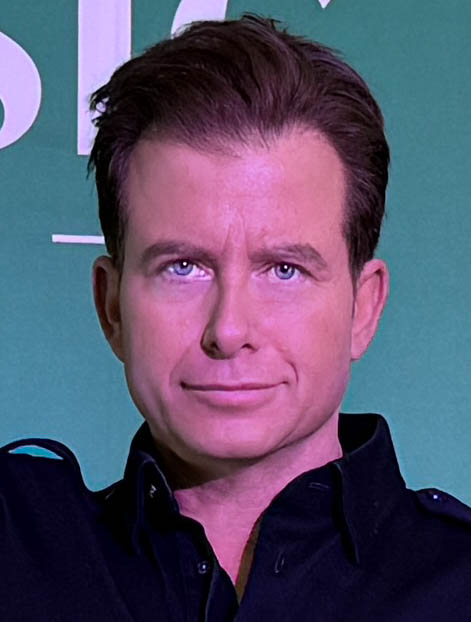
- Mark Oldman in 2024 headlining the Food & Wine Classic in Aspen
- Born: Mark Stanford Oldman; January 5, 1969 (age 57); Manhattan, New York
- Education: Stanford Law School (J.D.); Stanford University (M.A.); Stanford University (B.A.)
- Occupation: Wine critic
- Writing career
- Subject: Wine
- Website: bevinars.com

Mark Stanford Oldman (born January 5, 1969) is an American entrepreneur, wine expert, and author of several books on wine. Founder of the wine media company Bevinars.com, he has been described as "one of the wine world's great populizers" and "one of the wine world's great showmen." He is regularly named the "audience favorite" at major food and wine festivals and does private events for corporations and institutions. He also designed and teaches a course on entrepreneurship for Stanford University and was one of the youngest trustees of Stanford University.

== Early life ==
Oldman was born in the Manhattan borough of New York City, the son of a pediatrician and a psychologist. He was raised in the Martinsville section of Bridgewater Township, New Jersey and attended Bridgewater-Raritan High School East. In high school, he served as president of the National Honor Society and a member of the wrestling team.

Oldman received his B.A. and M.A. in English from Stanford University, where he graduated Phi Beta Kappa and was initiated into the Sigma Chi fraternity. He also received a J.D. from Stanford Law School, where he won the Hilmer Oehlmann Jr. Prize for excellence in writing. He founded and served as president of the Stanford Wine Circle, a popular campus club hosting tastings with California winemakers.

Oldman serves or has served on five major boards of Stanford, including its top governing body, the Stanford University Board of Trustees. As Stanford Trustee, he served as chairman of the board's Special Committee on Investment Responsibility (SCIR).

== Career ==
=== Internship expert ===
After graduating from college in 1992, Oldman and friend Samer Hamadeh conceived of and co-authored America's Top 100 Internships, published by the Princeton Review imprint of Random House. The book profiled the internship opportunities at such companies as Intel, Boeing, the Wall Street Journal, Walt Disney Studios, Rolling Stone, and MTV. In 1994, book made the Boston Globe's best-seller list. In 1995, Oldman and Hamadeh wrote The Internship Bible, also published by Random House. The book saw 17 editions published between 1995 and 2005.

=== Vault.com ===
In 1997, Oldman and Hamadeh founded Vault.com, a media company that provides career information by industry and by Fortune 1000 company, as well as rankings of companies and firms. He served as president of Vault.com until its sale in 2007 to a private equity firm. Along with Hamadeh, Oldman won Crain's "Top Entrepreneur's" award and was included on the Silicon Alley 100 list of influential tech executives.

Vault.com created what has become the authoritative prestige hierarchy for BigLaw, investment banking, and consulting. Its law firm prestige rankings proved so culturally embedded that when the brand was subsumed into a competitor platform in 2021, the backlash forced a full revival two years later. Nearly three decades after founding, the Vault 100 still draws rankings data from over 20,000 practicing associates annually.

=== Wine and food media ===
Oldman was lead judge in the PBS television series The Winemakers, filmed in Paso Robles wine country in California and in the Rhone Valley in France.

He contributes to several lifestyle magazines, including Bloomberg, Departures, Maxim, Travel & Leisure, Inc., and Wine Enthusiast.

Oldman wrote a wine column and chose the wine picks for the magazine Every Day with Rachael Ray. He has been the wine expert for Williams Sonoma, and wine columnist for the Food Network.

In 2005, he wrote Oldman’s Guide to Outsmarting Wine (Penguin), which is currently in its 11th edition and is published in Japan, Belgium, and in four volumes in France by Editions Solar. The book boils the basics of wine down to 108 concise chapters. It won the Duboeuf Best Wine Book Award for 2005 and was named a finalist for Best Wine Book at the Le Cordon Bleu World Food Media Awards.

In 2010, Oldman released Oldman's Brave New World of Wine (W.W. Norton), which profiles over 100 lesser-known wine types that are worth exploring. It includes interviews with Hilary Swank, Francis Ford Coppola, Matthew McConaughey, Jodie Foster, Ludacris, Geddy Lee, John Lithgow, and other high-profile wine lovers. It won the Duboeuf Best Wine Book Award for 2010 and was named an Apple iTunes “Best of Book of the Year”.

In 2016, he published How to Drink Like a Billionaire (Regan Arts/Simon & Schuster), which details insider methods to obtain the best value bottles and master wine in restaurants, shops, and at home. It won the 2017 IACP Cookbook Award in the Drinks category and the Gourmand World Cookbook Award for World's Best Wine Book.

Oldman regularly hosts "Wine for Billionaires" tastings at his home in Manhattan. Robert Mondavi Winery recently kicked off its 50th Anniversary Celebration with a wine tasting dinner at Oldman's Wine Sanctuary.

=== Bevinars by Mark Oldman ===
In response to the lockdown of the COVID-19 Pandemic, Oldman in 2020 launched a series of virtual wine tastings, classes, and winemaker interviews from his Wine Sanctuary in New York. Titled "Mark Oldman Virtual Wine Tastings," they are frequently subscribed to capacity on Zoom and include such subjects as "Hidden California Wines," "Sparkling Substitutes," and "War of the Celebrity Wines." They have garnered attention from media such as ABC News, the New York Post, and The Tonight Show with Jimmy Fallon.

In 2022, these tastings became Bevinars, and comprise both online and live, in-person wine tastings. The majority of Bevinars focus on an educational wine subject, while others feature Oldman interviewing a top winemaker such as Marcus Notaro of Chappellet Vineyards or Jeff Mangahas of Williams Selyem. They also consist of private events, with top companies from JP Morgan to the Jacques Pepin Foundation. Oldman's Bevinars wine classes stand out for their unbiased approach, celebrity instructor, and entertainment factor. The Bevinars style was largely honed during Oldman's many appearances at major food and wine festivals, and has been recognized by The New Yorker, the Washington Post, and Business Insider.

== Personal ==
Oldman is a noted art collector, with interests in Walton Ford, William Eggleston, Wayne Thiebaud, Harland Miller, and Vija Celmins. Stanford University named the Graduate Lounge of its McMurtry Building for Art & Art History for him.

== Bibliography ==
- America's Top 100 Internships. New York: Random House. 1995–2002. ISBN 978-0375751691.
- The Internship Bible. New York: Random House. 1996–2005. ISBN 978-0375764684.
- The Job Vault. Boston: Houghton Mifflin. 1998. ISBN 9780395861714.
- Vault Guide to the Top 100 Law Firms. New York: Vault. 2002. ISBN 978-1581314885.
- Oldman's Guide to Outsmarting Wine. New York: Penguin Group. 2004. ISBN 978-0142004920.
- Oldman's Brave New World of Wine. New York: W.W. Norton. 2010. ISBN 978-0393334845.
- How to Drink Like a Billionaire. New York: Regan Arts. 2016. ISBN 978-1942872146.

== Awards ==
- Georges Duboeuf Best Wine Book of the Year Award, 2005.
- Georges Duboeuf Best Wine Book of the Year Award, 2010.
- Gourmand International Cookbook Award, Best Drinks Education Book in the U.S., 2016.
- International Association of Culinary Professionals (IACP) Cookbook Award, Best Book for Wine, Beer, & Spirits, 2017.
- Gourmand International Cookbook Award, Best Drinks Education Book in the World, 2017.

== See also ==
- List of wine personalities
