= Dragonslayer (2011 film) =

- Promotional poster
- Directed by: Tristan Patterson
- Produced by: John Baker
- Cinematography: Eric Koretz
- Edited by: Lizzy Calhoun; Jennifer Tiexiera
- Music by: T. Griffin
- Production companies: Animals of Combat; Killer Films
- Distributed by: Drag City Records
- Release date: March 13, 2011 (SXSW)
- Running time: 73 minutes
- Country: United States
- Language: English

Dragonslayer is a 2011 American documentary film about skateboarder Josh "Skreech" Sandoval. It was directed by Tristan Patterson and won the best documentary prize at the 2011 South by Southwest Film Festival and Best International Feature at Hot Docs.

== Synopsis ==
The film follows Josh "Skreech" Sandoval, a skateboarder living in California. It was shot in various California towns as well as Copenhagen, Denmark and Malmö, Sweden.

The film begins with Sandoval cleaning out a pool behind an abandoned house. He skates in the pool a short time before a neighbor threatens to call the police. Toward the end of the film, Sandoval and Josh "Peacock" Henderson are interviewed on The Daily Habit where they discuss the effect the Great Recession has had on the availability of empty pools.

Sandoval skates in a contest in Malmö. He also skates at several different skateparks and pools in California. He spends a lot of time with his girlfriend, Leslie. They smoke marijuana, drink alcohol, hike, and fish. Sandoval also visits his infant son, Sid, and his ex-girlfriend, Angela. He gets a tattoo of a rocket with "Sid" written across it. At the tattoo parlour, Leslie flips through a skateboard book in which Sandoval is pictured as representative of "odd".

Sandoval usually stays with friends. At one point he is sleeping in a tent in a friend's backyard. After receiving a phone call from his mother, he says that he had not heard from her in six months, and before that had not heard from her in a year.

Sandoval and Leslie have a garage sale, then leave for a roadtrip to Arizona and Portland, Oregon. When they return, Leslie goes back to school and Sandoval begins working at a bowling alley next to Disneyland.

== Background ==
Filmmaker Tristan Patterson met Sandoval at a party in Chino, California. During the party, a video featuring Sandoval skating was projected on a wall. According to Patterson, Sandoval had this style that was all his own and he had this instinct for what he did."

== Reception ==
Due to its limited theatrical release, Dragonslayer was not widely reviewed. Review aggregation website Rotten Tomatoes gives the film a score of 88% based on reviews from 17 critics. It was a Critic's Pick by The New York Times, and the Los Angeles Times.

Lisa Schwarzbaum of Entertainment Weekly gave it an "A−", the Village Voice called it 'A new kind of youth movie for these uncertain times' and indieWire described it as 'the cinematic equivalent of punk rock candy.'

== SoundTrack ==
Dragon Slayer soundtrack consists of music from various Indie Punk Rock and Rock bands.

- Jacuzzi Boys - "Freakazoids"
- Children - "Subterranean Cities"
- Thee Oh Sees - "Rainbow 4. Death"
- The Soft Pack - "Move Along"
- Best Coast - "Summer Mood"
- Eddy Current and the Suppression Ring - "Hey Mum"
- Real Estate - "Basement"
- Little Girls - Golden Triangle - "Prize Fighter"
- Thee Oh Sees - "Meat Step Lively"
- Thee Oh Sees - "This Dreadful Heart"
- Saviours - "Into Abaddon"
- Bipolar Bear - "Old Guts"
- Dungeon - "Panda"

== Awards ==
- 2011 SXSW Film Festival: Grand Jury Winner, Documentary Feature Competition
- 2011 SXSW Film Festival: Best Cinematography (Eric Koretz), Documentary Feature Competition
- 2011 Hot Docs Film Festival: Best International Feature Documentary
