= Sarita Khurana =

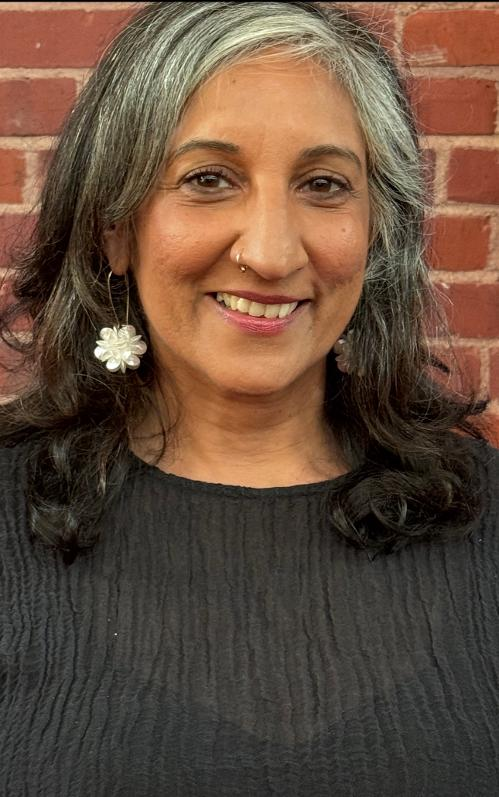
- Born: London, England
- Education: Oberlin College; Harvard University; Columbia University
- Awards: "Albert Maysles New Documentary Director Award" Tribeca Film Festival 2017

Sarita Khurana is a film director, producer, and educator based in Brooklyn, NY. Khurana's films explore South Asian stories from female perspectives. Migration, memory, culture, gender, and sexuality are common themes throughout her work. Khurana was the first Desi woman to win the Albert Maysles New Documentary Director Award at Tribeca Film Festival with her collaborator, Smriti Mundhra.

== Early life and education ==
Sarita Khurana was born in London, England in 1970, and grew up in New York City. While growing up in New York she became interested the arts, and in film in particular. She felt frustrated at the lack of representation or the misrepresentation of Asian women and immigrants in film. Khurana was part of an influential group of South Asian academics and activists working in New York in the mid-1990s. Khurana holds a B.A. from Oberlin College, a Master of Education from Harvard University, a Master in Fine Arts in Film from Columbia University's School of the Arts. Khurana contributed an essay to Sara Hill's 2007 anthology, Afterschool Matters: Creative Programs That Connect Youth Development and Student Achievement published by Corwin Press.

== Career and awards ==
Sarita Khurana is a filmmaker and cultural producer. Khurana's work in narrative, documentary and experimental film has been screened and exhibited internationally at the Tribeca Film Festival, Sheffield Doc/Fest, BFI London Film Festival, Mumbai Film Festival, and at the American Film Institute Docs Festival.

Khurana has received numerous awards, and fellowships over her career including the prestigious Albert Maysles New Documentary Director Award at the Tribeca Film Festival in New York in 2017, and the Pew Fellowship. In 2015 Khurana was awarded the NALIP-Diverse Women in Media Residency Lab Fellowship in Vermont. Khurana received a grant from Asian Women's Giving Circle in 2019 and a Fellowship from the Center for Asian American Media in 2020.

Her work has been supported by the Tribeca Film Institute, Asian American Documentary Network, the International Documentary Association, the National Film Development Corp of India, Women in Film, Film Independent, NY Women in Film & Television, the New York Times.

== Filmography ==
=== Home, Delivered (2020) ===
Home, Delivered is a micro-documentary that follows the story of community members in Queens who organized and delivered food to vulnerable Indian American seniors quarantined during the height of the Coronavirus pandemic in New York City. Home, Delivered was part of A-Doc‘s COVID stories series.

=== A Suitable Girl (2017) ===
A Suitable Girl follows three young women in India as they struggle to follow their dreams amid familial and cultural pressures to get married. Ritu, Dipti and Amrita are educated, financially stable contemporary middle-class women living in Mumbai and New Delhi. Yet their lives take a dramatic turn when the pressure to settle down and get married hits. Documenting the matchmaking process in vérité over four years, A Suitable Girl examines the complex relationships between marriage, family, and culture.

A Suitable Girl was co-directed by Sarita Khurana and Smriti Mundhra. They met in film school at Columbia University connecting over their similar Indian backgrounds and wanted to create a film that explored the complexities of arranged marriages. They followed Dipti, Amrita, and Ritu over four years as they navigated their daily lives, careers, families, and friends.

A Suitable Girl, premiered in the Tribeca Film Festival in 2017 and won the Albert Maysles New Documentary Director Award. Khurana and Mundra were the first Desi women to earn the New Documentary Director Award. The film has also been screened at British Film Institute, Mumbai Film Festival, AFI Docs, Amazon and Netflix. In 2018, Library Journal reviewed and recommended the film be included in library collections.

=== What Remains (2010) ===
What Remains follows the story of a woman who returns to her childhood home only to discover an unsettling past. This experimental film written and directed in collaboration with contemporary visual artist Chitra Ganesh. Among the places it was screened was the Brooklyn Museum and the Goteborgs Konsthall.

=== B.E.S. (Bangla East Side) (2004) ===
B.E.S. is a documentary that focuses that ways working-class Bangladeshi immigrant youth remap the geography of downtown Manhattan and create new spaces that link their memories of Dhaka with their everyday realities living in New York City. This documentary film was co-directed with Fariba Alam. B.E.S. documents the lives of four Bangladeshi Muslim teenagers living in Manhattan's Lower East Side. Mahfuja, Maroofa, Saleh and Jemi immigrated to New York as children, and as all four of them are juniors and seniors at a public high school. The directors, came to the school to videotape the students, but also gave the students cameras to film each other. Living in a post-911 New York, these young immigrants are acutely conscious of their embodiment of racial and religious difference. This film won a New York Times Production Grant.

== Cine Qua Non Lab ==
Sarita Khurana is the co-founder of Cine Qua Non Lab, an international development lab for narrative feature films founded in 2008, based in Mexico and the U.S. The collaborative lab includes Jeannie Donohoe, Julie Buck, Luis Trelles and Jesús Pimentel Melo.

In May 2020, Khurana made a short film called Home, Delivered for A-Doc's Covid Stories series about work community groups are doing in support of South Asian seniors in Queens, NY.
