= St. Louis Superman =

2019 documentary film by Sami Khan and Smriti Mundhra

- Film poster
- Directed by: Sami Khan; Smriti Mundhra
- Produced by: Sami Khan; Smriti Mundhra; Poh Si Teng; Cheyenne Tan
- Starring: Bruce Franks Jr.
- Cinematography: Sami Khan; Chris Renteria
- Production companies: MTV Studios; Meralta Films; AJE Witness; ALJAZEERA
- Distributed by: MTV Documentary Films (US only); ALJAZEERA (Globally)
- Release date: February 20, 2019 (BSFI)
- Running time: 28 minutes
- Language: English

St. Louis Superman is a 2019 American short documentary film about activist, battle rapper, and former politician Bruce Franks Jr. It was directed by Sami Khan and Smriti Mundhra. It was released by MTV Documentary Films.

== Synopsis ==
Franks became an activist in the unrest in the St. Louis suburb of Ferguson, Missouri, following the shooting of Michael Brown in 2014. Franks was elected to the Missouri House of Representatives in 2016. The film covers his time in state government and his struggles with unresolved childhood trauma, including witnessing his nine-year-old brother's death in a shooting.

== Production ==
Sheila Nevins of MTV Documentary Films purchased St. Louis Superman after it showed the 2019 Tribeca Film Festival. Nevins had the filmmakers add a coda that elaborated on Franks' mental health struggles. In the United States, it was broadcast on MTV, VH1, and MTV2 on May 18, 2020.

== Awards ==
St. Louis Superman premiered at the 2019 Big Sky Documentary Film Festival, where it won the jury Prize for Best Documentary Short. It also showed at the 2019 Tribeca Film Festival, where it won the special jury mention; Hot Docs Canadian International Documentary Festival, where it won the audience award for best short; AFI Docs, where it won the audience award; and the St. Louis International Film Festival, where it won best local short.

St. Louis Superman was nominated for Best Documentary (Short Subject) for the 92nd Academy Awards.
