= Bruce Franks Jr. =

American politician (born 1984)

Member of the Missouri House of Representatives from the 78th district
- In office 2016–2019
- Preceded by: Penny Hubbard
- Succeeded by: Rasheen Aldridge Jr.

Personal details
- Born: September 22, 1984 (age 42) Saint Louis, Missouri, US
- Party: Democratic
- Occupation: Politician
- Website: x.com/STLSupaMan

Bruce Franks Jr. (born September 22, 1984) is an American community activist, musician, battle rapper, and former politician. He served in the Missouri House of Representatives representing the 78th District and as the chairman of the Subcommittee on Police/Community Relations before resigning in 2019.

== Early life, education and career ==
Franks was born in 1984. He attended schools in the Lindbergh School District in Saint Louis County, Missouri as part of a voluntary desegregation program. Franks performed as a rapper under the name of Ooops!. In 2004, Franks was struck by a stray bullet in his knee. Franks was a notable member of the Saint Louis branch of the civil rights movement Black Lives Matter and was involved in numerous protests against police brutality, racism, and inequality. In March 2015, Franks started the organization 28 to Life, an urban employment charity that helped match black youths with jobs.

== 2016 state election for the 78th District ==
In a highly publicized legal dispute, Franks contested the results of the August 2 Democratic primary, in which Democratic candidate Penny Hubbard was victorious. Franks argued before a judge that there were irregularities in the casting of absentee ballots. Circuit Judge Rex Burlison agreed with Franks and ordered a second election, in which Franks was victorious.

== Missouri legislature ==
Franks works in St. Louis Agency on Training and Employment (SLATE), a teen mentoring program for underprivileged youths.

Franks was among seven arrested during a November 24, 2017 Black Friday protest at the Saint Louis Galleria. The protest was part of a 2017 economic boycott of Saint Louis businesses as a reaction to the acquittal of Jason Stockley. BET Network listed Representative Franks as one of the "Great 28" a list of civil rights activists who are described as "Shaking up the world and the way we see things. Redefining what’s possible. Forging their own path rather than conforming to the system." He resigned in 2019 due to mental health concerns. After resigning, he was ordered to pay $14,169 after an investigation found he spent money from his campaign fund on personal expenses and failed to file accurate reports with Missouri ethics officials.

== Political positions ==
=== Abortion and reproductive rights ===
NARAL Missouri gives Representative Franks a ranking of 89% on their 2017 legislative scorecard.

=== Criminal justice reform ===
Representative Franks has sponsored two bills relating to criminal justice reform: HB 1581, which opposes incarceration of individuals who fail to pay child support, and HB 1579, relating to good time credit for prisoners.

=== Civil rights ===
Representative Franks has introduced legislation to allow convicted felons to be able to vote.

=== Medical marijuana ===
Representative Franks is a supporter of Medical cannabis, introducing legislation to allow patients to have access to cannabis as part of their treatment.

== Personal life ==
Franks has five children and two stepsons. Franks has 33 different tattoos, most notably tear tattoos under both of his eyes. Franks is also an active Battle Rapper who goes by the name of ooops. His most iconic battle was against fellow Artist and Battle Rapper Daylyt.

Franks is the subject of the Academy Award-nominated documentary short St. Louis Superman.
