= New York International Children's Film Festival =

Annual film festival

New York International Children's Film Festival (NYICFF) was founded in 1997 to create a more dynamic film culture for kids. Its flagship event is the annual, Oscar-qualifying film festival, during which NYICFF presents the best new films from around the world for ages 3-18 (and above!) to an audience of 15,000 in New York City. Other core activities include Kid Flicks, a year-round national touring program, and FilmEd Field Trips, a media arts and literacy program.

== Annual Festival ==
The flagship New York City Festival has grown from one weekend of films into the largest film festival for children and teens in North America. Screened over the course of three weeks at venues throughout NYC, the Festival program—narrowed down from roughly 2,500 international submissions—consists of approximately 100 short and feature films, filmmaker Q&As, retrospective programs, parties, and premieres. The festival slate typically represents over 30 countries and films in more than 15 languages. Audience members of all ages vote on the Festival-winning films, and additional weight is given to votes of audiences under the age of 18. In addition to screenings and events, the festival provides an environment where kids are truly taken seriously and encouraged to use their voices.

== Festival Jury ==
Winners of the Festival's juried prizes are eligible for Academy consideration in the Best Animated and Best Live Action Short Film categories.

=== 2010 ===
- Adam Gopnik
- Frances McDormand
- Lynn McVeigh
- Matthew Modine
- Michel Ocelot
- Dana Points
- Susan Sarandon
- James Schamus
- Evan Shapiro
- Uma Thurman
- John Turturro
- Christine Vachon
- Gus Van Sant

=== 2011 ===
- Adam Gopnik
- Lynn McVeigh
- Matthew Modine
- Michel Ocelot
- Dana Points
- Susan Sarandon
- James Schamus
- Evan Shapiro
- Uma Thurman
- John Turturro
- Christine Vachon
- Gus Van Sant

=== 2012 ===
- John Canemaker
- Adam Gopnik
- Lynn McVeigh
- Matthew Modine
- Tomm Moore
- Michel Ocelot
- Dana Points
- Susan Sarandon
- James Schamus
- Evan Shapiro
- Uma Thurman
- Christine Vachon
- Gus Van Sant
- Taika Waititi
- Jeffrey Wright

=== 2013 ===
- John Canemaker
- Geena Davis
- Lynn McVeigh
- Matthew Modine
- Tomm Moore
- Michel Ocelot
- Dana Points
- Susan Sarandon
- James Schamus
- Evan Shapiro
- Christine Vachon
- Gus Van Sant
- Taika Waititi
- Jeffrey Wright

=== 2014 ===
- John Canemaker
- Geena Davis
- Lynn McVeigh
- Matthew Modine
- Richard Peña
- Bill Plympton
- Dana Points
- Susan Sarandon
- James Schamus
- Henry Selick
- Evan Shapiro
- Uma Thurman
- Christine Vachon
- Gus Van Sant
- Taika Waititi
- Jeffrey Wright

=== 2015 ===
- John Canemaker
- Geena Davis
- Lynn McVeigh
- Matthew Modine
- Richard Peña
- Bill Plympton
- Dana Points
- Susan Sarandon
- James Schamus
- Henry Selick
- Christine Vachon
- Gus Van Sant
- Taika Waititi
- Jeffrey Wright

=== 2016 ===
- John Canemaker
- Sofia Coppola
- Geena Davis
- Lynn McVeigh
- Matthew Modine
- Julianna Moore
- Richard Peña
- Bill Plympton
- Dana Points
- Susan Sarandon
- James Schamus
- Christine Vachon
- Gus Van Sant
- Taika Waititi
- Jeffrey Wright

=== 2017 ===
- John Canemaker
- Sofia Coppola
- Geena Davis
- Lynn McVeigh
- Matthew Modine
- Richard Peña
- Bill Plympton
- Dana Points
- James Schamus
- Uma Thurman
- Christine Vachon
- Gus Van Sant
- Taika Waititi
- Nadine Zylstra
- Jeffrey Wright

=== 2018 ===
- John Canemaker
- Sofia Coppola
- Geena Davis
- Lynne McVeigh
- Matthew Modine
- Julianne Moore
- Richard Peña
- Bill Plympton
- Dana Points
- Susan Sarandon
- James Schamus
- Christine Vachon
- Gus Van Sant
- Taika Waititi
- Jeffrey Wright

=== 2019 ===
- John Canemaker
- Melissa Cobb
- Sofia Coppola
- Geena Davis
- Hope Davis
- Madeline Di Nonno
- Jorge R. Gutiérrez
- Elizabeth Ito
- Kyle MacLachlan
- Lynn McVeigh
- Matthew Modine
- Mark Osborne
- Ira Sachs
- Zoe Saldaña
- Uma Thurman
- Nora Twomey
- Taika Waititi
- Jeffrey Wright

=== 2020 ===
- John Canemaker
- Geena Davis
- Hope Davis
- Madeline Di Nonno
- Jorge R. Gutiérrez
- Elizabeth Ito
- Kyle MacLachlan
- Lynn McVeigh
- Matthew Modine
- Mark Osborne
- Peter Ramsey
- Karen Rupert Toliver
- Ira Sachs
- Uma Thurman
- Nora Twomey

=== 2021 ===
- Melissa Cobb
- Sofia Coppola
- Geena Davis
- Madeline Di Nonno
- Jorge R. Gutiérrez
- Matthew Modine
- Mark Osborne
- Uma Thurman
- Nora Twomey
- Taika Waititi

=== 2022 ===
- Peilin Chou
- Melissa Cobb
- Geena Davis
- Madeline Di Nonno
- Elizabeth Ito
- Kyle MacLachlan
- Guillermo Martinez
- Matthew Modine
- Ramsey Ann Naito
- Peter Ramsey
- Ira Sachs
- Uma Thurman
- Nora Twomey

=== 2023 ===
- Hsiang Chin Moe
- Kim Díaz
- Kyle MacLachlan
- Huda Razzak
- Ira Sachs
- Uma Thurman
- Nora Twomey
- Christine Vachon

=== 2024 ===
- Jarelle Dampier
- Ilana Glazer
- Guillermo Martinez
- Matthew Modine
- Chris Nee
- Peter Ramsey
- Benjamin Renner
- Ira Sachs
- Phillipa Soo
- Ellen Su
- Uma Thurman

=== 2025 ===
- Lake Bell
- Guillermo Martinez
- Seth Meyers
- Matthew Modine
- Chris Nee
- Bob Odenkirk
- Erin Odenkirk
- Ellen Su
- Kay Wilson Stallings

=== 2026 ===
- Madeline Di Nonno
- Jorge R. Gutiérrez
- Guillermo Martinez
- Matthew Modine
- Chris Nee
- Bob Odenkirk
- Erin Odenkirk
- Peter Ramsey
