= CineMagic (film festival) =

Film festival for young people founded in Northern Ireland

CineMagic is a film festival and registered charity founded in Belfast in 1988 with the aim of nurturing the talents of aspiring filmmakers between the ages of 4 and 25. It continues to be hosted primarily in Belfast, but has spread around the world since its inception and now hosts annual events in Dublin, London, Los Angeles, and New York City.

CineMagic is the largest film and television festival for young people, and bills itself as the "World Screen Festival" for them. Its patrons include John Bell, Patrick Bergin, Pierce Brosnan, Brian Cox, Craig Doyle, Colin Farrell, Lisa Henson, Mark Huffam, Saoirse-Monica Jackson, Suranne Jones, Paula Malcomson, Seamus McGarvey, Ciaran McMenamin, Liam Neeson, Dermot O'Leary, David Parfitt, Saoirse Ronan, and Bronagh Waugh.

== See also ==
- Northern Ireland Screen
