= 61st Academy Awards =

- Official poster
- Date: March 29, 1989
- Site: Shrine Auditorium; Los Angeles, California, U.S.
- Produced by: Allan Carr
- Directed by: Jeff Margolis

Highlights
- Best Picture: Rain Man
- Most awards: Rain Man (4)
- Most nominations: Rain Man (8)

TV in the United States
- Network: ABC
- Duration: 3 hours, 19 minutes
- Ratings: 42.68 million 29.81% (Nielsen ratings)

The 61st Academy Awards ceremony, organized by the Academy of Motion Picture Arts and Sciences (AMPAS), honored the best films of 1988 and took place on March 29, 1989, at the Shrine Auditorium in Los Angeles, beginning at 6:00 p.m. PST / 9:00 p.m. EST. During the ceremony, AMPAS presented Academy Awards (commonly referred to as Oscars) in 23 categories. The ceremony, televised in the United States by ABC, was produced by Allan Carr and directed by Jeff Margolis. Ten days earlier, in a ceremony held at the Beverly Hills Hotel in Beverly Hills, California, the Academy Awards for Technical Achievement were presented by host Angie Dickinson.

Rain Man won four awards, including Best Picture. Other winners included Who Framed Roger Rabbit with four awards, Dangerous Liaisons with three, and The Accused, The Accidental Tourist, A Fish Called Wanda, The Appointments of Dennis Jennings, Beetlejuice, Bird, Hôtel Terminus: The Life and Times of Klaus Barbie, The Milagro Beanfield War, Mississippi Burning, Pelle the Conqueror, Tin Toy, Working Girl, and You Don't Have to Die with one award each.

The telecast drew in over 42 million viewers in the United States, making it the most-viewed ceremony up to that point, until it was surpassed by the 70th Academy Awards in 1998, which garnered a viewership of over 57 million. The ceremony featured changes such as the introduction of the phrase "And the Oscar goes to..." and the absence of a traditional host. The ceremony's opening number, featuring Snow White and Rob Lowe, received heavy criticism. Allan Carr faced significant backlash, leading the Academy to form a committee to address the criticisms and evaluate the ceremony's production.

== Winners and nominees ==
The nominees for the 61st Academy Awards were announced on February 15, 1989, at the Samuel Goldwyn Theater in Beverly Hills, California, by Richard Kahn, president of the Academy, and actress Anne Archer. Rain Man led all nominees, with eight; Dangerous Liaisons and Mississippi Burning tied for second with seven each.

The winners were announced at the award ceremony on March 29, 1989. Best Actress winner Jodie Foster became the eighth person in history to win the aforementioned category for a film with a single nomination. The last person to achieve this feat was Sophia Loren when she won for Two Women in 1961. Best Actor winner Dustin Hoffman was the fifth person to win the aforementioned category twice. Sigourney Weaver became the fifth performer to receive two acting nominations in the same year but did not win in either category. John Lasseter and William Reeves won Best Animated Short Film for Tin Toy, which was Pixar's first Oscar ever and the first CGI film to win an Oscar.

=== Awards ===
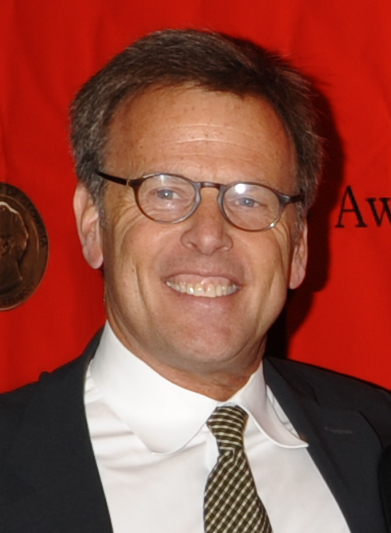
Mark Johnson, Best Picture winner

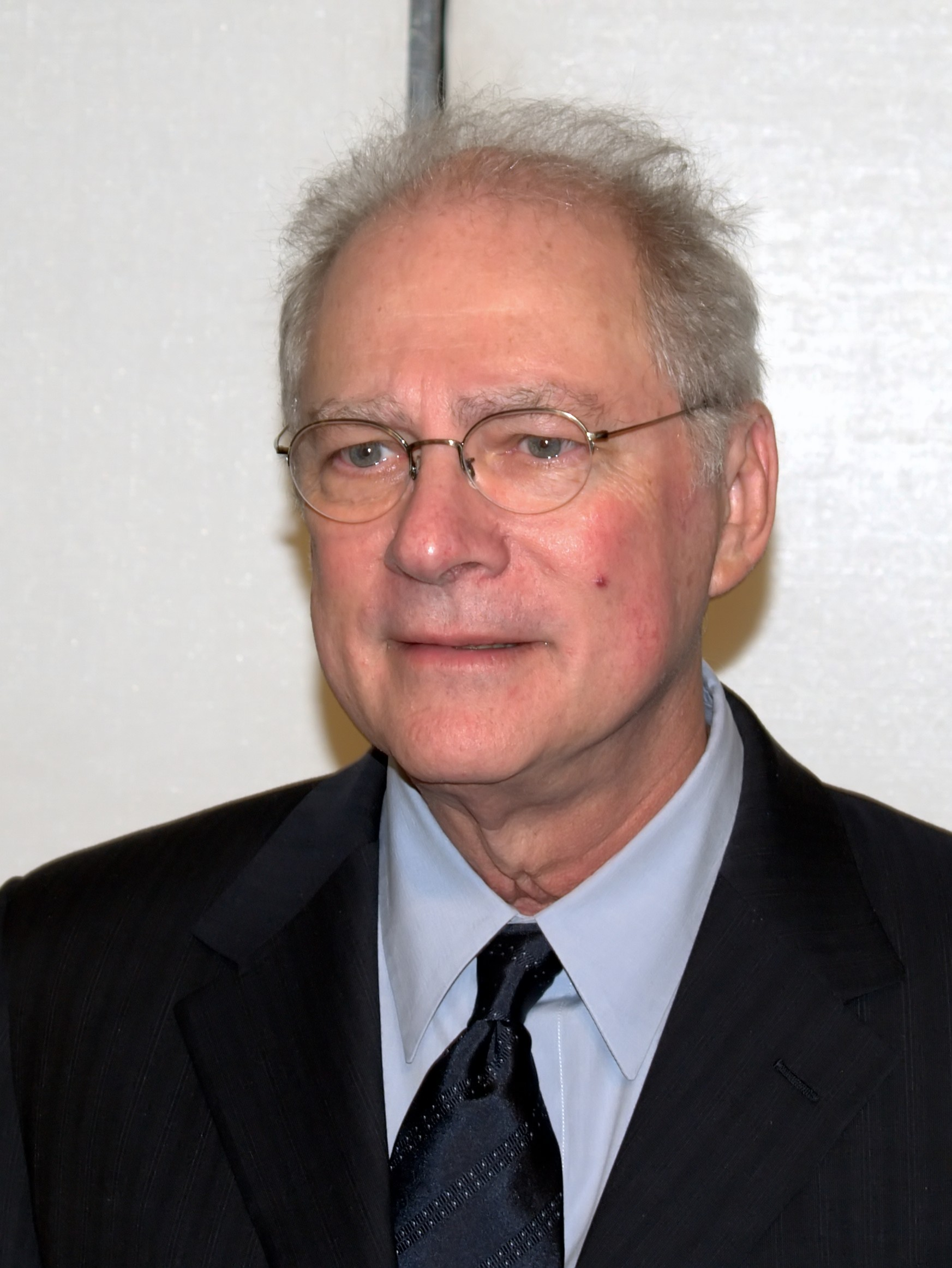
Barry Levinson, Best Director winner

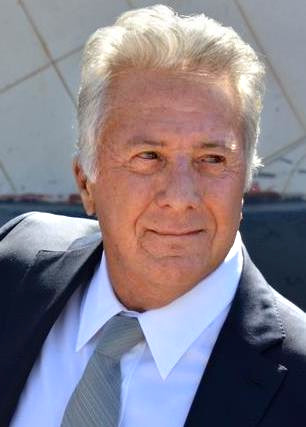
Dustin Hoffman, Best Actor winner

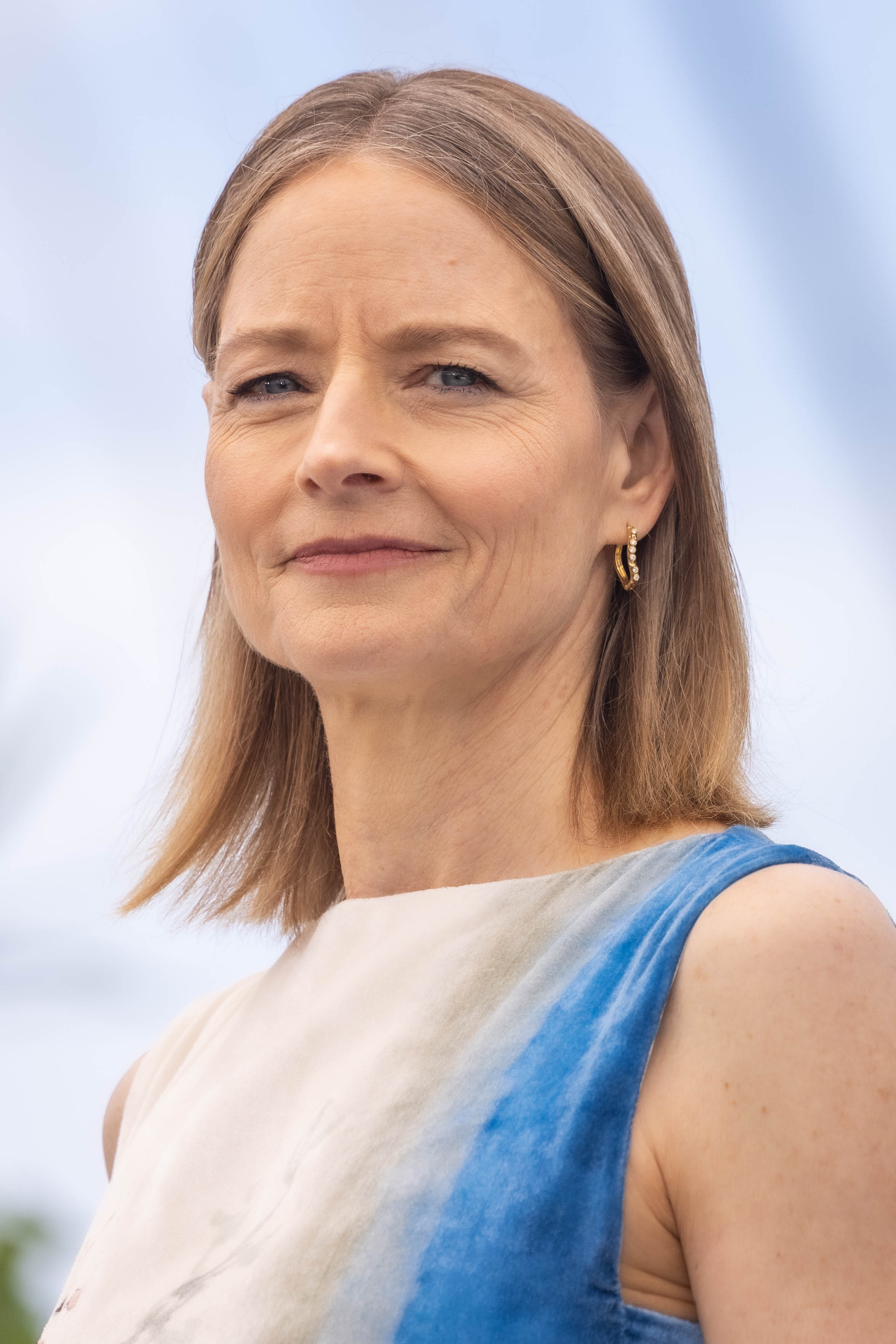
Jodie Foster, Best Actress winner

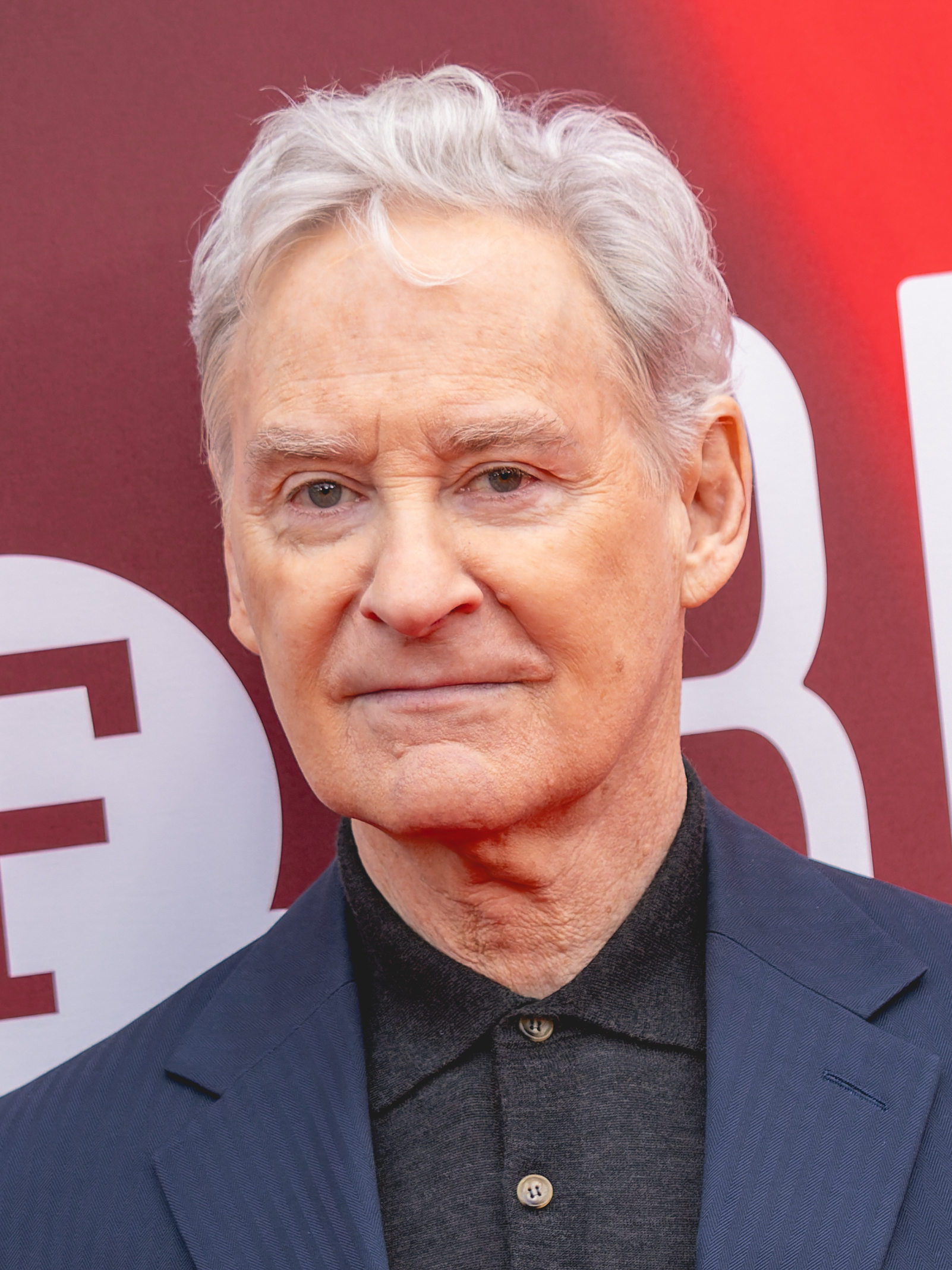
Kevin Kline, Best Supporting Actor winner

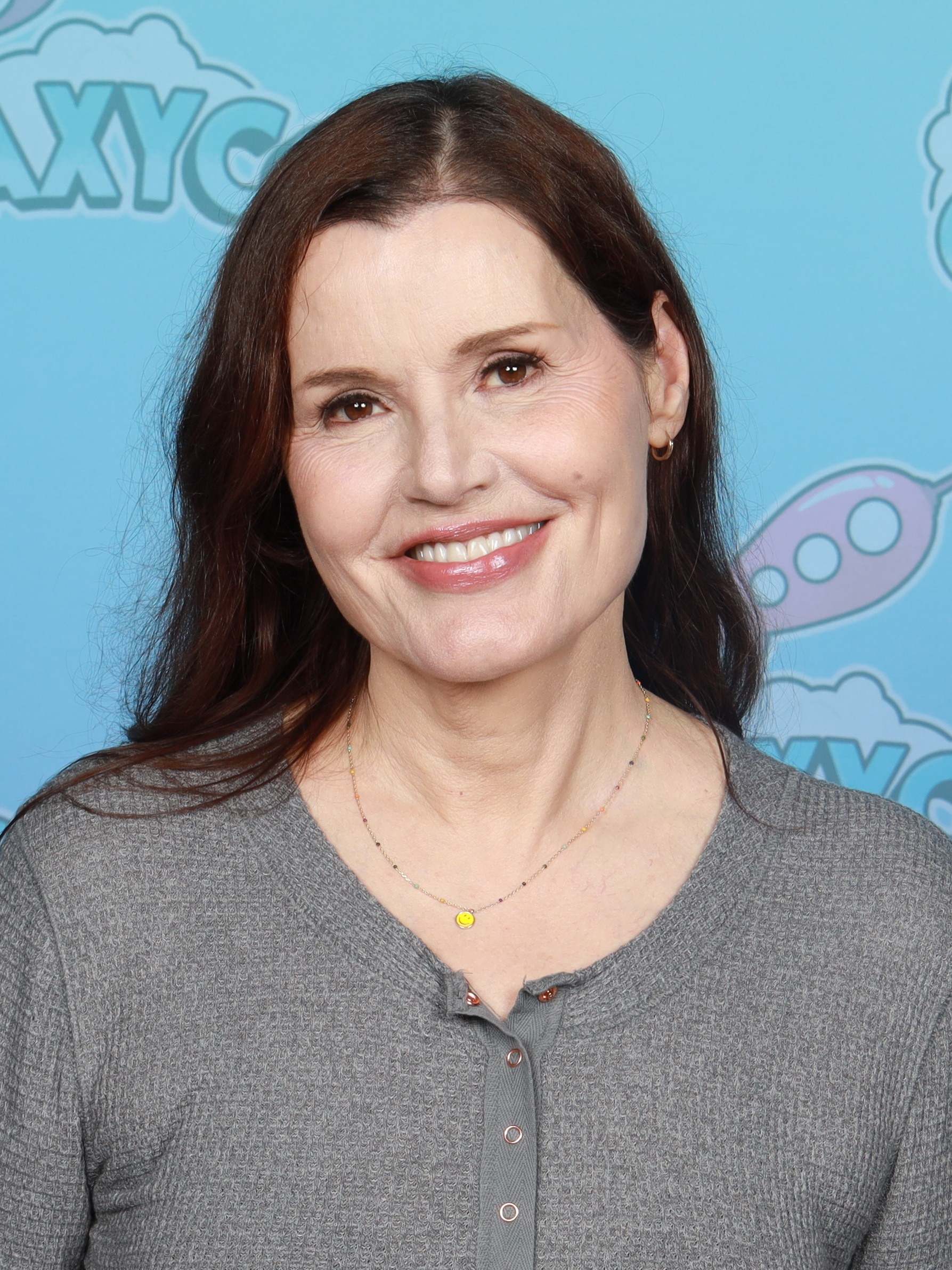
Geena Davis, Best Supporting Actress winner

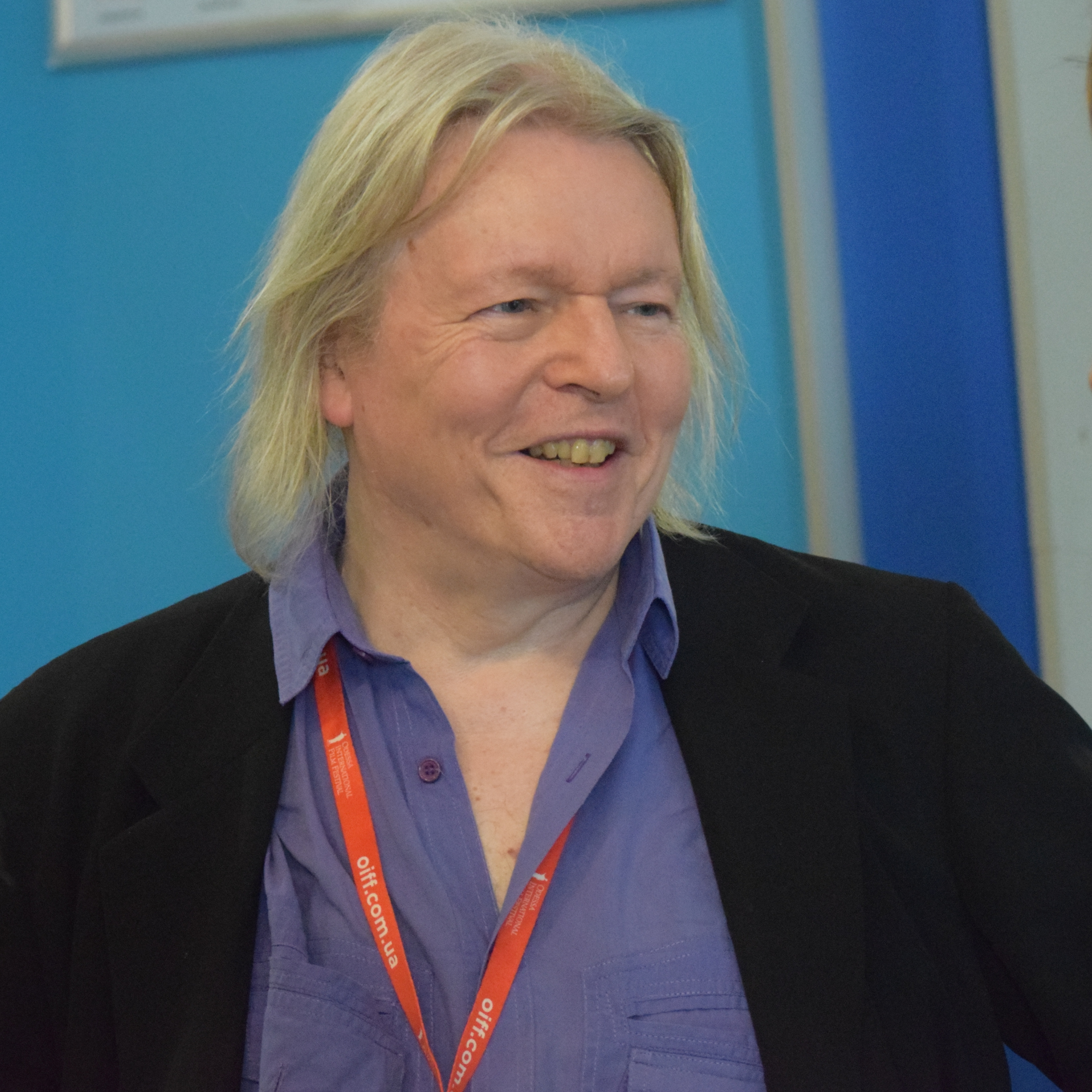
Christopher Hampton, Best Adapted Screenplay winner

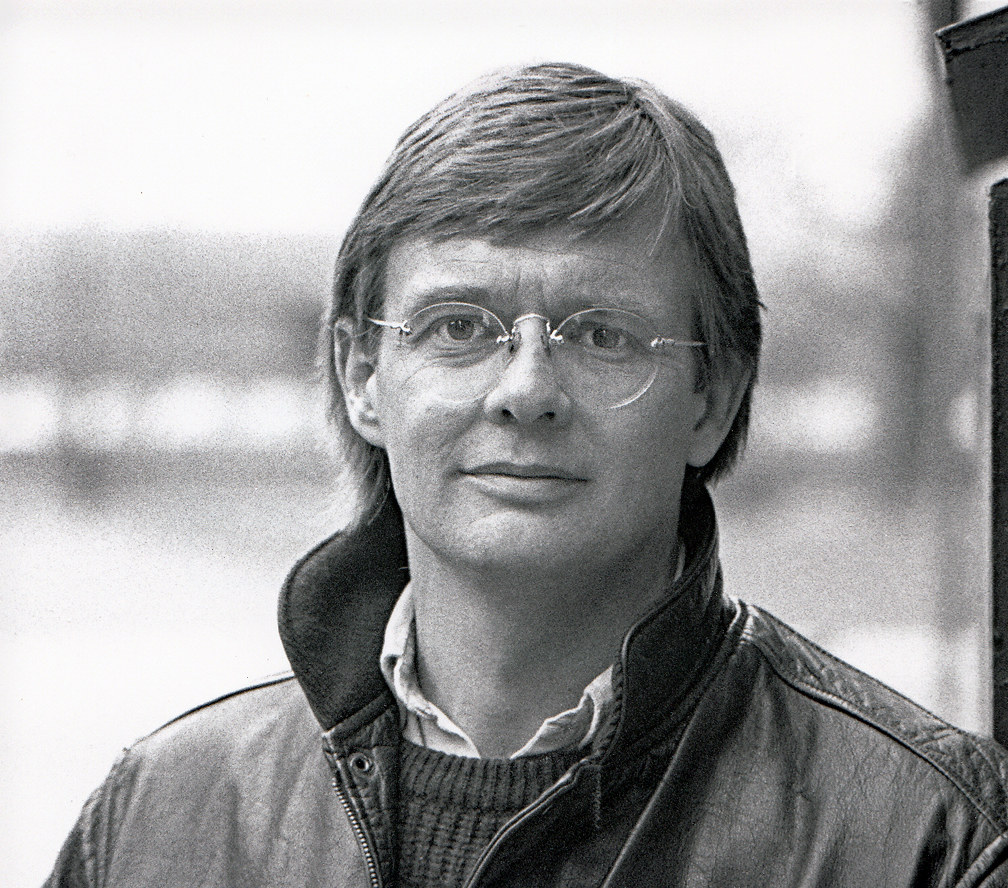
Bille August, Best Foreign Language Film winner

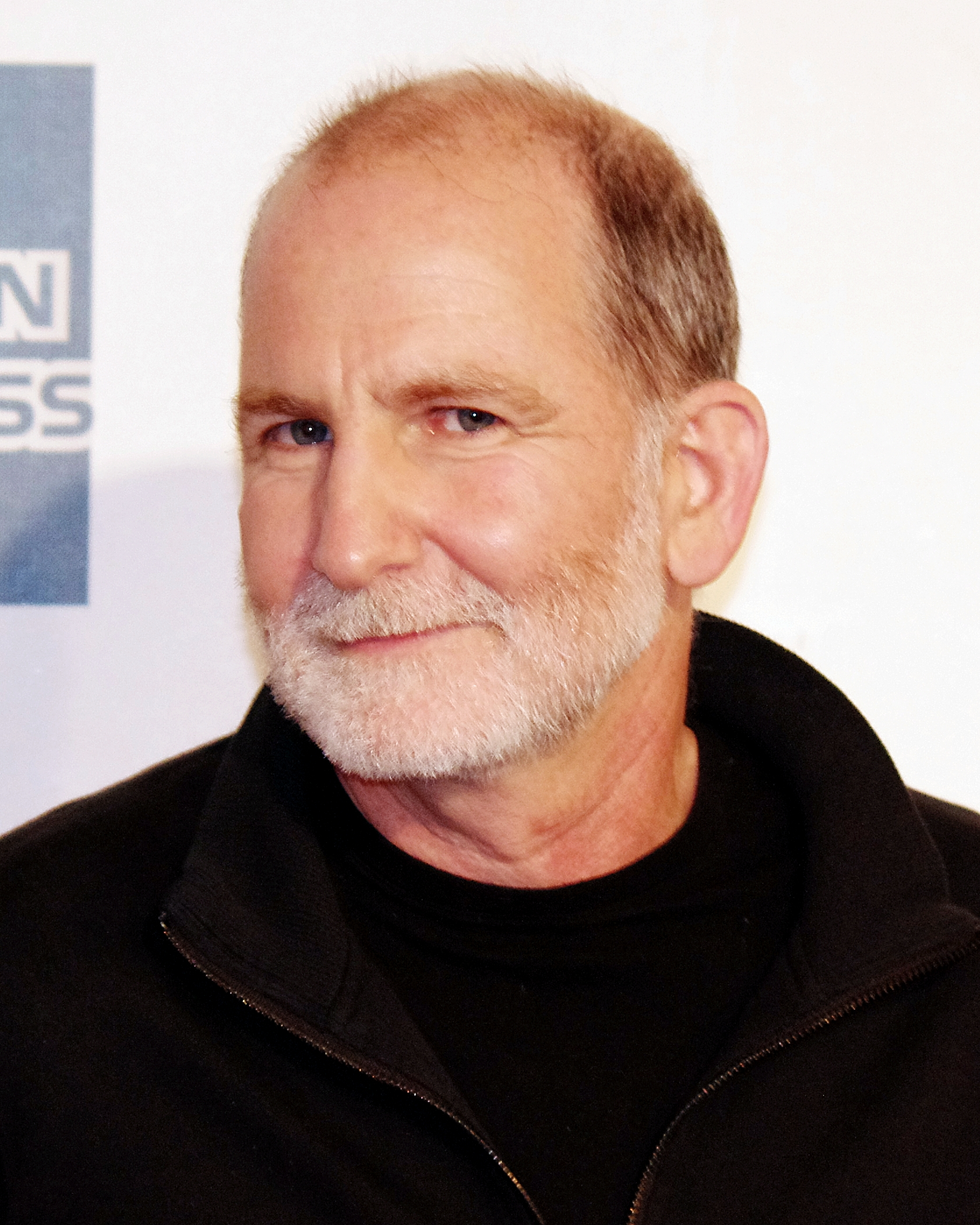
Bill Guttentag, Best Documentary Short Subject co-winner

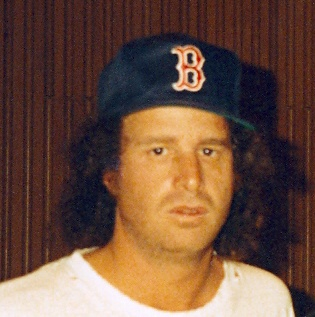
Steven Wright, Best Live Action Short Film co-winner

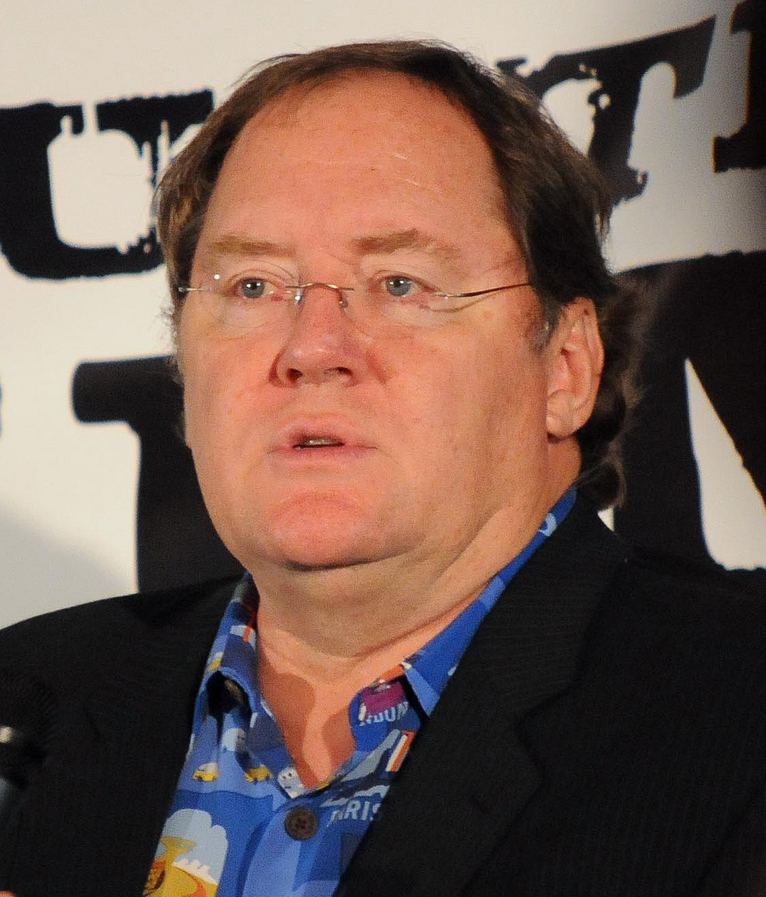
John Lasseter, Best Animated Short Film co-winner

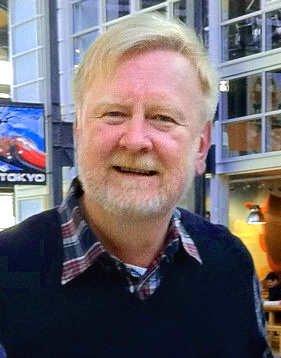
William Reeves, Best Animated Short Film co-winner

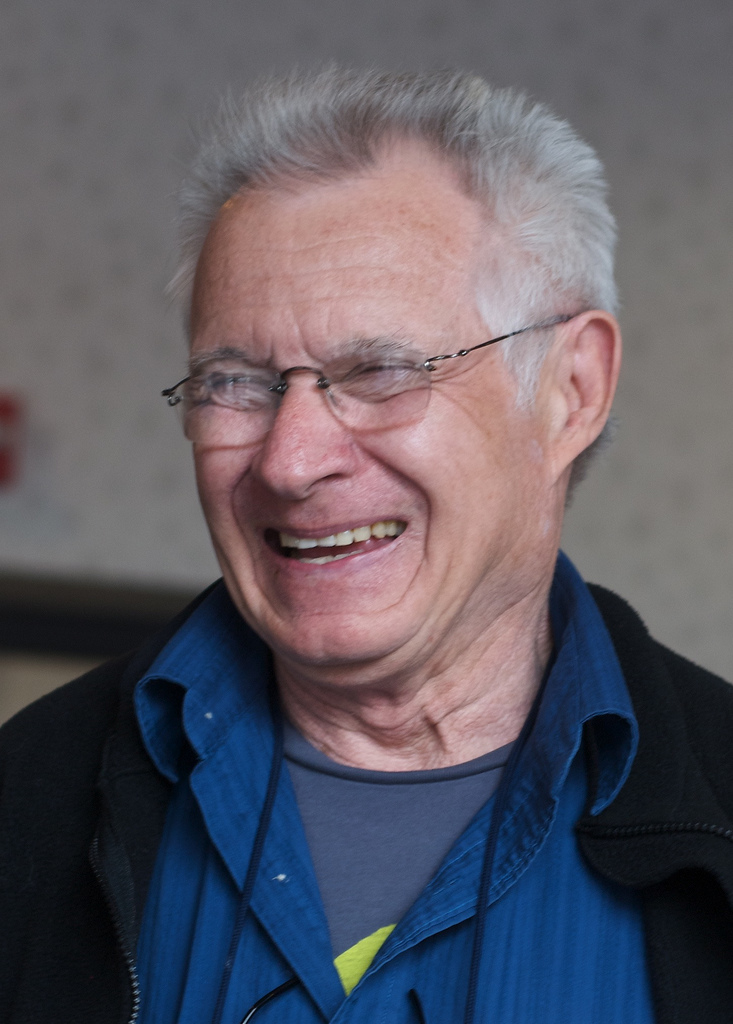
Dave Grusin, Best Original Score winner

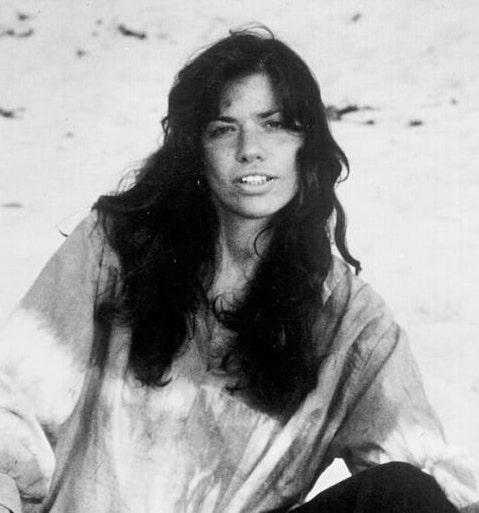
Carly Simon, Best Original Song winner

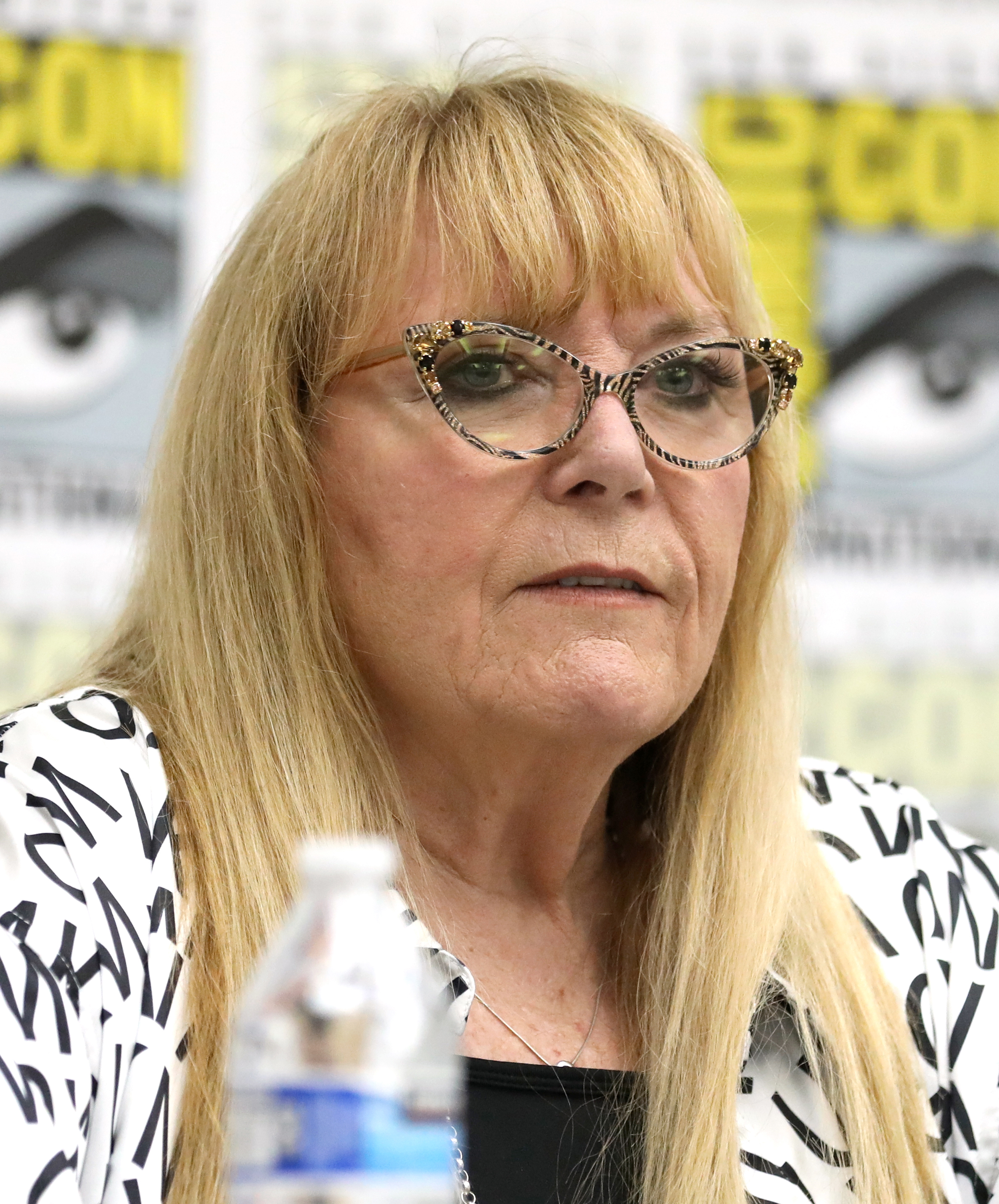
Ve Neill, Best Makeup co-winner

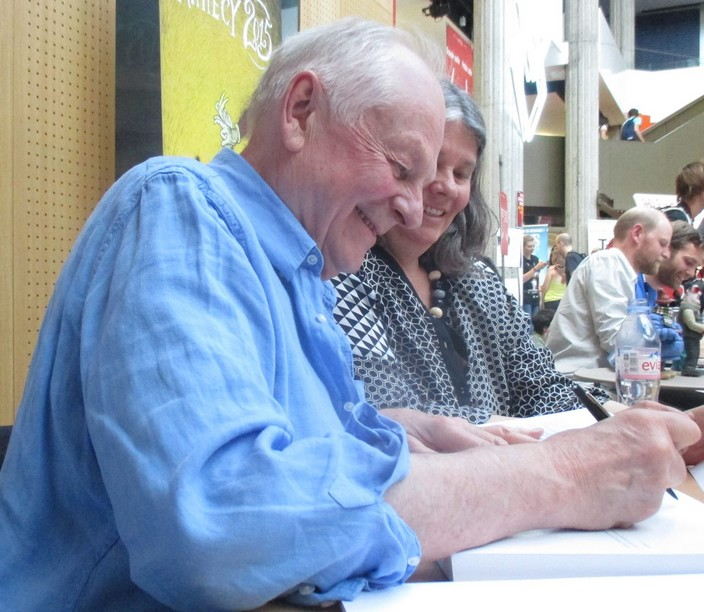
Richard Williams, Best Visual Effects co-winner

Winners are listed first and highlighted in boldface.

| **Best Picture**: **Rain Man – Mark Johnson, producer**; The Accidental Tourist – Lawrence Kasdan, Charles Okun, and Michael Grillo, producers; Dangerous Liaisons – Norma Heyman and Hank Moonjean, producers; Mississippi Burning – Frederick Zollo and Robert F. Colesberry, producers; Working Girl – Douglas Wick, producer | **Best Directing**: **Barry Levinson – Rain Man**; Charles Crichton – A Fish Called Wanda; Martin Scorsese – The Last Temptation of Christ; Alan Parker – Mississippi Burning; Mike Nichols – Working Girl |
| **Best Actor in a Leading Role**: **Dustin Hoffman – Rain Man as Raymond Babbitt**; Gene Hackman – Mississippi Burning as Agent Rupert Anderson; Tom Hanks – Big as Josh Baskin; Edward James Olmos – Stand and Deliver as Jaime Escalante; Max von Sydow – Pelle the Conqueror as Lassefar | **Best Actress in a Leading Role**: **Jodie Foster – The Accused as Sarah Tobias**; Glenn Close – Dangerous Liaisons as Marquise Isabelle de Merteuil; Melanie Griffith – Working Girl as Tess McGill; Meryl Streep – A Cry in the Dark as Lindy Chamberlain; Sigourney Weaver – Gorillas in the Mist as Dian Fossey |
| **Best Actor in a Supporting Role**: **Kevin Kline – A Fish Called Wanda as Otto West**; Alec Guinness – Little Dorrit as William Dorrit; Martin Landau – Tucker: The Man and His Dream as Abe Karatz; River Phoenix – Running on Empty as Danny Pope; Dean Stockwell – Married to the Mob as Tony "The Tiger" Russo | **Best Actress in a Supporting Role**: **Geena Davis – The Accidental Tourist as Muriel Pritchett**; Joan Cusack – Working Girl as Cynthia; Frances McDormand – Mississippi Burning as Mrs. Pell; Michelle Pfeiffer – Dangerous Liaisons as Madame Marie de Tourvel; Sigourney Weaver – Working Girl as Katharine Parker |
| **Best Writing (Screenplay Written Directly for the Screen)**: **Rain Man – Screenplay by Ronald Bass, Barry Morrow; Story by Barry Morrow**; Big – Gary Ross and Anne Spielberg; Bull Durham – Ron Shelton; A Fish Called Wanda – Screenplay by John Cleese; Story by John Cleese and Charles Crichton; Running on Empty – Naomi Foner | **Best Writing (Screenplay Based on Material from Another Medium)**: **Dangerous Liaisons – Christopher Hampton based on the play Les Liaisons Dangereuses by Christopher Hampton and the novel by Pierre Choderlos de Laclos**; The Accidental Tourist – Frank Galati and Lawrence Kasdan based on the novel by Anne Tyler; Gorillas in the Mist – Screenplay by Anna Hamilton Phelan; Story by Anna Hamilton Phelan and Tab Murphy based on articles by Harold T.P. Hayes and Alex Shoumatoff; Little Dorrit – Christine Edzard based on the novel by Charles Dickens; The Unbearable Lightness of Being – Jean-Claude Carrière and Philip Kaufman based on the novel by Milan Kundera |
| **Best Foreign Language Film**: **Pelle the Conqueror (Denmark) in Danish – Bille August**; Hanussen (Hungary) in Hungarian – István Szabó; The Music Teacher (Belgium) in French – Gérard Corbiau; Salaam Bombay! (India) in Hindi – Mira Nair; Women on the Verge of a Nervous Breakdown (Spain) in Spanish – Pedro Almodóvar | **Best Documentary (Feature)**: **Hôtel Terminus: The Life and Times of Klaus Barbie – Marcel Ophuls**; The Cry of Reason: Beyers Naude - An Afrikaner Speaks Out – Robert Bilheimer and Ronald Mix; Let's Get Lost – Bruce Weber and Nan Bush; Promises to Keep – Ginny Durrin; Who Killed Vincent Chin? – Renee Tajima and Christine Choy |
| **Best Documentary (Short Subject)**: **You Don't Have to Die – William Guttentag and Malcolm Clarke**; The Children's Storefront – Karen Goodman; Family Gathering – Lise Yasui and Ann Tegnell; Gang Cops – Thomas B. Fleming and Daniel J. Marks; Portrait of Imogen – Nancy Hale and Meg Partridge | **Best Short Film (Live Action)**: **The Appointments of Dennis Jennings – Dean Parisot and Steven Wright**; Cadillac Dreams – Matia Karrell and Abbee Goldstein; Gullah Tales – George deGolian and Gary Moss |
| **Best Short Film (Animated)**: **Tin Toy – John Lasseter and William Reeves**; The Cat Came Back – Cordell Barker; Technological Threat – Bill Kroyer and Brian Jennings | **Best Music (Original Score)**: **The Milagro Beanfield War – Dave Grusin**; The Accidental Tourist – John Williams; Dangerous Liaisons – George Fenton; Gorillas in the Mist – Maurice Jarre; Rain Man – Hans Zimmer |
| **Best Music (Original Song)**: **"Let the River Run" from Working Girl – Music and Lyrics by Carly Simon**; "Calling You" from Bagdad Cafe – Music and Lyrics by Bob Telson; "Two Hearts" from Buster – Music by Lamont Dozier; Lyrics by Phil Collins | **Best Sound**: **Bird – Les Fresholtz, Dick Alexander, Vern Poore, and Willie D. Burton**; Die Hard – Don Bassman, Kevin F. Cleary, Richard Overton, and Al Overton Jr.; Gorillas in the Mist – Andy Nelson, Brian Saunders, and Peter Handford; Mississippi Burning – Robert J. Litt, Elliot Tyson, Rick Kline, and Danny Michael; Who Framed Roger Rabbit – Robert Knudson, John Boyd, Don Digirolamo, and Tony Dawe |
| **Best Sound Effects Editing**: **Who Framed Roger Rabbit – Charles L. Campbell and Louis Edemann**; Die Hard – Stephen Hunter Flick and Richard Shorr; Willow – Ben Burtt and Richard Hymns | **Best Art Direction**: **Dangerous Liaisons – Art Direction: Stuart Craig; Set Decoration: Gérard James**; Beaches – Art Direction: Albert Brenner; Set Decoration: Garrett Lewis; Rain Man – Art Direction: Ida Random; Set Decoration: Linda DeScenna; Tucker: The Man and His Dream – Art Direction: Dean Tavoularis; Set Decoration: Armin Ganz; Who Framed Roger Rabbit – Art Direction: Elliot Scott; Set Decoration: Peter Howitt |
| **Best Cinematography**: **Mississippi Burning – Peter Biziou**; Rain Man – John Seale; Tequila Sunrise – Conrad Hall; The Unbearable Lightness of Being – Sven Nykvist; Who Framed Roger Rabbit – Dean Cundey | **Best Makeup**: **Beetlejuice – Ve Neill, Steve La Porte, and Robert Short**; Coming to America – Rick Baker; Scrooged – Thomas R. Burman and Bari Dreiband-Burman |
| **Best Costume Design**: **Dangerous Liaisons – James Acheson**; Coming to America – Deborah Nadoolman Landis; A Handful of Dust – Jane Robinson; Sunset – Patricia Norris; Tucker: The Man and His Dream – Milena Canonero | **Best Film Editing**: **Who Framed Roger Rabbit – Arthur Schmidt**; Die Hard – Frank J. Urioste and John F. Link; Gorillas in the Mist – Stuart Baird; Mississippi Burning – Gerry Hambling; Rain Man – Stu Linder |
**Best Visual Effects**: **Who Framed Roger Rabbit – Ken Ralston, Richard Williams, Edward Jones, and George Gibbs**; Die Hard – Richard Edlund, Al DiSarro, Brent Boates, and Thaine Morris; Willow – Dennis Muren, Michael J. McAlister, Phil Tippett, and Chris Evans

=== Special Achievement Award ===
- To Richard Williams for the animation direction of Who Framed Roger Rabbit.

=== Honorary Awards ===
- To the National Film Board of Canada in recognition of its 50th anniversary and its dedicated commitment to originate artistic, creative and technological activity and excellence in every area of film making.
- To Eastman Kodak Company in recognition of the company's fundamental contributions to the art of motion pictures during the first century of film history.

=== Films with multiple nominations and wins ===
The following 17 films received multiple nominations:

| Nominations | Film |
|---|---|
| 8 | Rain Man |
| 7 | Dangerous Liaisons |
| 7 | Mississippi Burning |
| 6 | Who Framed Roger Rabbit (Note: Not counting the non-competitive Special Achievement Award for Who Framed Roger Rabbit.) |
| 6 | Working Girl |
| 5 | Gorillas in the Mist |
| 4 | The Accidental Tourist |
| 4 | Die Hard |
| 3 | A Fish Called Wanda |
| 3 | Tucker: The Man and His Dream |
| 2 | Big |
| 2 | Coming to America |
| 2 | Little Dorrit |
| 2 | Pelle the Conqueror |
| 2 | Running on Empty |
| 2 | The Unbearable Lightness of Being |
| 2 | Willow |

The following three films received multiple awards:

| Awards | Film |
|---|---|
| 4 | Rain Man |
| 3 | Dangerous Liaisons |
| 3 | Who Framed Roger Rabbit |

== Presenters and performers ==
The following individuals, listed in order of appearance, presented awards or performed musical numbers:

=== Presenters ===
| Name(s) | Role |
|---|---|
| Charlie O'Donnell | Announcer for the 61st annual Academy Awards |
| Richard Kahn (AMPAS president) | Gave opening remarks welcoming guests to the awards ceremony |
| Tom Selleck | Introducers of presenters Melanie Griffith and Don Johnson |
| Melanie Griffith; Don Johnson | Presenters of the award for Best Supporting Actress |
| Jane Fonda | Presenter of the film Rain Man on the Best Picture segment |
| Kim Novak; James Stewart | Presenters of the awards for Best Sound and Best Sound Effects Editing |
| Robert Downey Jr. Cybill Shepherd | Presenters of the award for Best Makeup |
| Patrick Swayze | Presenter of film tribute to 1950s movie musicals and the award for Best Original Score |
| Olivia Newton-John | Introducer of presenters Donald Sutherland and Kiefer Sutherland |
| Donald Sutherland; Kiefer Sutherland | Presenters of the Academy Honorary Award to the National Film Board of Canada |
| Anjelica Huston | Presenter of the film Mississippi Burning on the Best Picture segment |
| Willem Dafoe; Gene Hackman | Presenters of the award for Best Art Direction |
| Bo Derek; Dudley Moore | Presenters of the award for Best Costume Design |
| Billy Crystal | Presenter of the movie tap dancers and Best Original Song performances montage |
| Sammy Davis Jr. Gregory Hines | Presenters of the award for Best Original Song |
| Candice Bergen; Jacqueline Bisset; Jack Valenti | Presenters of the award for Best Foreign Language Film |
| Barbara Hershey | Presenter of the film The Accidental Tourist on the Best Picture segment |
| Michael Caine; Sean Connery; Roger Moore | Presenters of the award for Best Supporting Actor |
| Beau Bridges; Jeff Bridges; Lloyd Bridges | Presenters of the award Best Visual Effects |
| Walter Matthau | Introducer of presenters Lucille Ball and Bob Hope |
| Lucille Ball; Bob Hope | Introducers of the performance of the "I Wanna Be an Oscar Winner" musical number |
| Geena Davis; Jeff Goldblum | Presenters of the award for Best Documentary Short Subject |
| Edward James Olmos; Max von Sydow | Presenters of the award for Best Documentary Feature |
| Anne Archer | Presenter of the film Dangerous Liaisons on the Best Picture segment |
| Charles Fleischer; Robin Williams | Presenters of the Special Achievement Academy Award to Richard Williams |
| Demi Moore; Bruce Willis | Presenter of the award for Best Cinematography |
| Carrie Fisher; Martin Short | Presenters of the awards for Best Live Action Short Film and Best Animated Short Film |
| Michael Douglas | Presenter of the award for Best Actor |
| Ali MacGraw | Presenter of the film Working Girl on the Best Picture segment |
| Farrah Fawcett; Ryan O'Neal | Presenters of the award for Best Film Editing |
| Angie Dickinson | Presenter of the segment of the Academy Awards for Technical Achievement and the Gordon E. Sawyer Award |
| Richard Dreyfuss; Amy Irving | Presenters of the award Best Original Screenplay |
| Michelle Pfeiffer; Dennis Quaid | Presenters of the award for Best Adapted Screenplay |
| Goldie Hawn; Kurt Russell | Presenters of the award for Best Director |
| Tom Cruise; Dustin Hoffman | Presenters of the award for Best Actress |
| Cher | Presenter of the award for Best Picture |

=== Performers ===
| Name(s) | Role | Performed |
|---|---|---|
| Marvin Hamlisch | Musical arranger | Orchestral |
| Army Archerd; Eileen Bowman; Coral Browne; Cyd Charisse; Dale Evans; Alice Faye; Merv Griffin; Dorothy Lamour; Rob Lowe; Tony Martin; Vincent Price; Buddy Rogers; Roy Rogers; Lily Tomlin | Performers | "I Only Have Eyes for You" from Dames "You Are My Lucky Star" from Broadway Melody of 1936 "I've Got a Lovely Bunch of Coconuts" "Proud Mary" "Hooray for Hollywood" from Hollywood Hotel |
| Keith Coogan; Patrick Dempsey; Corey Feldman; Joely Fisher; Tricia Leigh Fisher; Savion Glover; Carrie Hamilton; Melora Hardin; Ricki Lake; Matt Lattanzi; Chad Lowe; Tracy Nelson; Patrick O'Neal; Corey Parker; D. A. Pawley; Tyrone Power Jr. Holly Robinson; Christian Slater; Blair Underwood | Performers | "(I Wanna Be an) Oscar Winner" |

== The ceremony ==
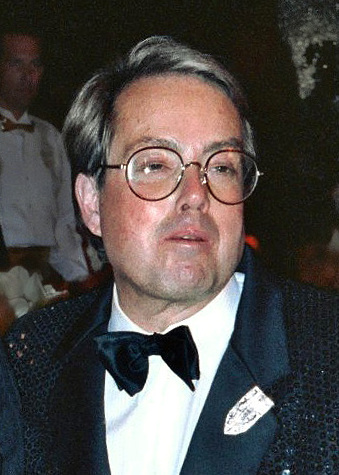
Allan Carr served as producer for the 61st Academy Awards.

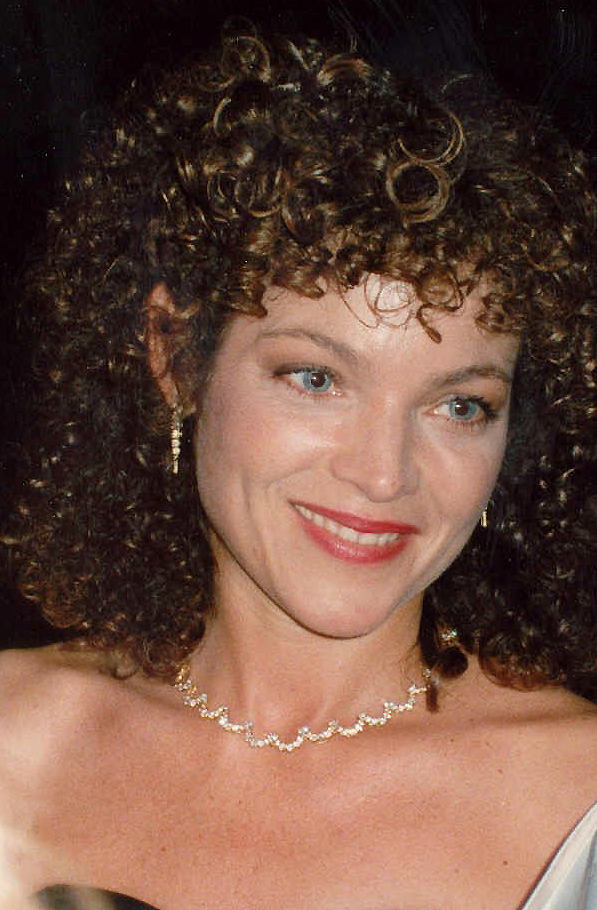
Amy Irving at the Governor's Ball after the Awards.

In an attempt to attract viewers to the telecast and increase interest in the festivities, the Academy hired film producer and veteran Oscar ceremony executive talent coordinator Allan Carr to produce the 1989 ceremony. In interviews with various media outlets, he expressed that it was a dream come true to produce the Oscars.

Notable changes were introduced in the production of the telecast. For the first time, presenters announced each winner with the phrase "And the Oscar goes to..." rather than "And the winner is...". The green room where Oscar presenters, performers, and winners gathered backstage was transformed into a luxurious suite complete with furniture, pictures, refreshments, and other amenities called "Club Oscar". Instead of hiring a host for the proceedings, Carr heavily relied on presenters, often grouped in pairs that had some connection, either through family or the film industry (a theme he billed as "couples, companions, costars, and compadres"); not until 2019 would another ceremony lack a host.

Several other people were involved in the production of the ceremony. Jeff Margolis served as director of the telecast. Lyricist and composer Marvin Hamlisch was hired as musical supervisor of the festivities. Comedian and writer Bruce Vilanch was hired as a writer for the broadcast, a role he filled until 2014. Carr had also rounded up eighteen young stars, including Patrick Dempsey, Corey Feldman, Ricki Lake, and Blair Underwood, to perform in a musical number entitled "I Wanna Be an Oscar Winner". Unlike in most Oscar ceremonies, however, Carr announced that none of the three songs nominated for Best Original Song would be performed live.

The telecast was also remembered for being the final public appearance of actress and comedian Lucille Ball, where she and co-presenter Bob Hope were given a standing ovation. On April 26, almost a month after the ceremony, she died from a dissecting aortic aneurysm at age 77.

=== Opening number ===
In an effort to showcase more glamour and showmanship in the ceremony, producer Carr hired playwright Steve Silver to co-produce an opening number inspired by Silver's long-running musical revue, Beach Blanket Babylon. The segment consisted of an elaborate stage show centered on actress Eileen Bowman, dressed as Snow White from Disney's Snow White and the Seven Dwarfs, who comes to Hollywood and is entranced by its glamour. Like Beach Blanket Babylon, the opening act also featured dancers wearing giant, elaborate hats. In a setting designed to resemble the Cocoanut Grove nightclub, Hollywood dignitaries such as actresses Alice Faye, Dorothy Lamour, Cyd Charisse, her husband Tony Martin, as well as Buddy Rogers and Vincent Price were prominently featured, while singer and television producer Merv Griffin sang a rendition of the song "I've Got a Lovely Bunch of Coconuts" (of which he had had a hit recording in 1949). Bowman and actor Rob Lowe then sang a reworked version of Creedence Clearwater Revival's "Proud Mary", with lyrics rewritten to refer to the film industry.

=== Critical reviews and public reaction ===
The majority of media outlets panned the show. Los Angeles Times television critic Howard Rosenberg lamented, "the Academy Awards telecast on ABC was surprisingly devoid of magic. It was on the musty side, and compared with last month's Grammycast, absolutely moribund." Film critic Janet Maslin chastised the opening number, saying it "deserves a permanent place in the annals of Oscar embarrassments". She also bemoaned that the "I Wanna Be an Oscar Winner" number "was confusingly shot and inspired no confidence in Hollywood's future". Television editor Tony Scott of Variety complained, "The 61st Annual Academy Awards extravaganza—seen in 91 different countries including, for the first time, the Soviet Union—turned out to be a TV nyet" He also observed that the "Break-Out Superstars number" looked like they were "cavorting around a giant Oscar as if it were the golden calf".

The telecast also received a mixed reception from professionals within the show business industry. Talent agent Michael Ovitz praised Carr, saying that he had "brought show business back to the movie business". Actress Jennifer Jones thanked Carr in a written letter to the producer, which read, "You delivered." On the other hand, seventeen people, including actors Paul Newman, Gregory Peck, and Julie Andrews, and directors Billy Wilder and Joseph L. Mankiewicz, signed an open letter deriding the telecast as "an embarrassment to both the Academy and the entire motion picture industry".

Just outside the auditorium, on Jefferson Boulevard, a group of San Francisco drag queens, calling themselves the Sisters of Perpetual Indulgence stood in Mae West wigs and gowns, saying that they had come “to show our support for Allan Carr” for producing the first “gay Oscars.” There has been speculation that some of the blowback against the ceremony, which was the first produced by an openly gay person and which prominently featured a musical number based on a gay nightclub show, was homophobic in nature, although others, such as Bruce Vilanch and David Geffen, have challenged that assessment.

In addition, The Walt Disney Company filed suit against AMPAS for use of the likeness of Snow White. The lawsuit demanded unspecified damages for "copyright infringement, unfair competition, and dilution of business reputation". Academy President Richard Kahn immediately issued an apology to the studio, and the lawsuit was subsequently dropped.

Bowman has claimed that she was made to sign a gag order the next day, prohibiting her from speaking to the press about her performance for the next 13 years. She finally spoke about it publicly in a 2013 interview, in which she described the performance as looking "like a gay bar mitzvah".

=== Ratings and aftermath ===
Despite the criticism regarding the production of the ceremony, the American telecast on ABC drew in an average of 42.68 million people over its length, which was a 1% increase from the previous year's ceremony. The show also drew higher Nielsen ratings compared to the previous ceremony, with 29.81% of households watching over a 50.41 share. It was the highest-rated Oscar broadcast since the 56th ceremony, held in 1984. An estimated 75 million total viewers watched all or part of the awards.

Nevertheless, AMPAS created an Awards Presentation Review Committee to evaluate and determine why the telecast earned such a negative reaction from the media and the entertainment industry. The committee later determined that Carr's biggest mistake was allowing the questionable opening number to run for 12 minutes. Producer and former Directors Guild of America president Gilbert Cates, who headed the committee, said that Carr would not have received such harsh criticism if the number had been much shorter. Cates was subsequently hired as producer of the succeeding year's telecast.

According to various showbiz insiders and reporters, the criticism and backlash from the ceremony resulted in Carr never again producing a film or theatrical show. He died from complications resulting from liver cancer on June 29, 1999, at the age of 62.

==== Box office performance of nominees ====
At the time of the nominations announcement on February 15, the combined gross of the five Best Picture nominees at the US box office was $188 million, with an average of $37.7 million per film. Rain Man was the highest earner among the Best Picture nominees, with $97 million in domestic box office receipts. The film was followed by Working Girl ($42.1 million), The Accidental Tourist ($24.2 million), Mississippi Burning ($18.6 million), and finally Dangerous Liaisons ($6.69 million).

Of the top 50 grossing movies of the year, 52 nominations went to 13 films. Only Big (3rd), Rain Man (5th), Working Girl (21st), The Accused (32nd), The Accidental Tourist (38th), Gorillas in the Mist (40th), Mississippi Burning (45th), and Tucker: The Man and His Dream (50th) were nominated for Best Picture, directing, acting, or screenwriting. The other top 50 box office hits that earned nominations were Who Framed Roger Rabbit (1st), Coming to America (2nd), Die Hard (7th), Beetlejuice (9th), and Willow (12th).

== See also ==
- 9th Golden Raspberry Awards
- 31st Grammy Awards
- 41st Primetime Emmy Awards
- 42nd British Academy Film Awards
- 43rd Tony Awards
- 46th Golden Globe Awards
- List of submissions to the 61st Academy Awards for Best Foreign Language Film

== Bibliography ==
- Hofler, Robert (2010). Party Animals : A Hollywood Tale of Sex, Drugs, and Rock 'n' Roll Starring the Fabulous Allan Carr. Cambridge, Massachusetts, United States: Da Capo Press. ISBN 978-0-306-81655-0. OCLC 779680732.
- Levy, Emanuel (2003). All About Oscar: The History and Politics of the Academy Awards. New York, United States: Continuum International Publishing Group. ISBN 0-8264-1452-4.
- Osborne, Robert (2008). 80 Years of the Oscar: The Complete History of the Academy Awards. New York, United States: Abbeville Publishing Group. ISBN 978-0-7892-0992-4.
- Pond, Steve (2005). The Big Show: High Times and Dirty Dealings Backstage at the Academy Awards. New York, United States: Faber and Faber. ISBN 0-571-21193-3.
- Wiley, Mason; Bona, Damien (1996). Inside Oscar: The Unofficial History of the Academy Awards (5 ed.). New York, United States: Ballantine Books. ISBN 0-345-40053-4. OCLC 779680732.
