= Crack USA: County Under Siege =

1989 film

- Directed by: Vince DiPersio; Bill Guttentag
- Written by: Vince DiPersio; Bill Guttentag
- Produced by: Vince DiPersio; Bill Guttentag
- Narrated by: Joe Mantegna
- Music by: Tangerine Dream
- Distributed by: HBO
- Release date: 1989
- Running time: 42 minutes
- Country: United States
- Language: English

Crack USA: County Under Siege is a 1989 American documentary film directed by Vince DiPersio and Bill Guttentag.

== Summary ==
An examination of the crack epidemic alongside difficulties faced by the community and law enforcement agencies combating it.

== Production ==
Filmed in West Palm Beach, Florida in eight weeks with a cinema verite approach, it was eventually broadcast on HBO as part of America Undercover.

== Accolades ==
It was nominated for an Academy Award for Best Documentary Feature.
