= Michael Ware =

Australian journalist (born 1969)

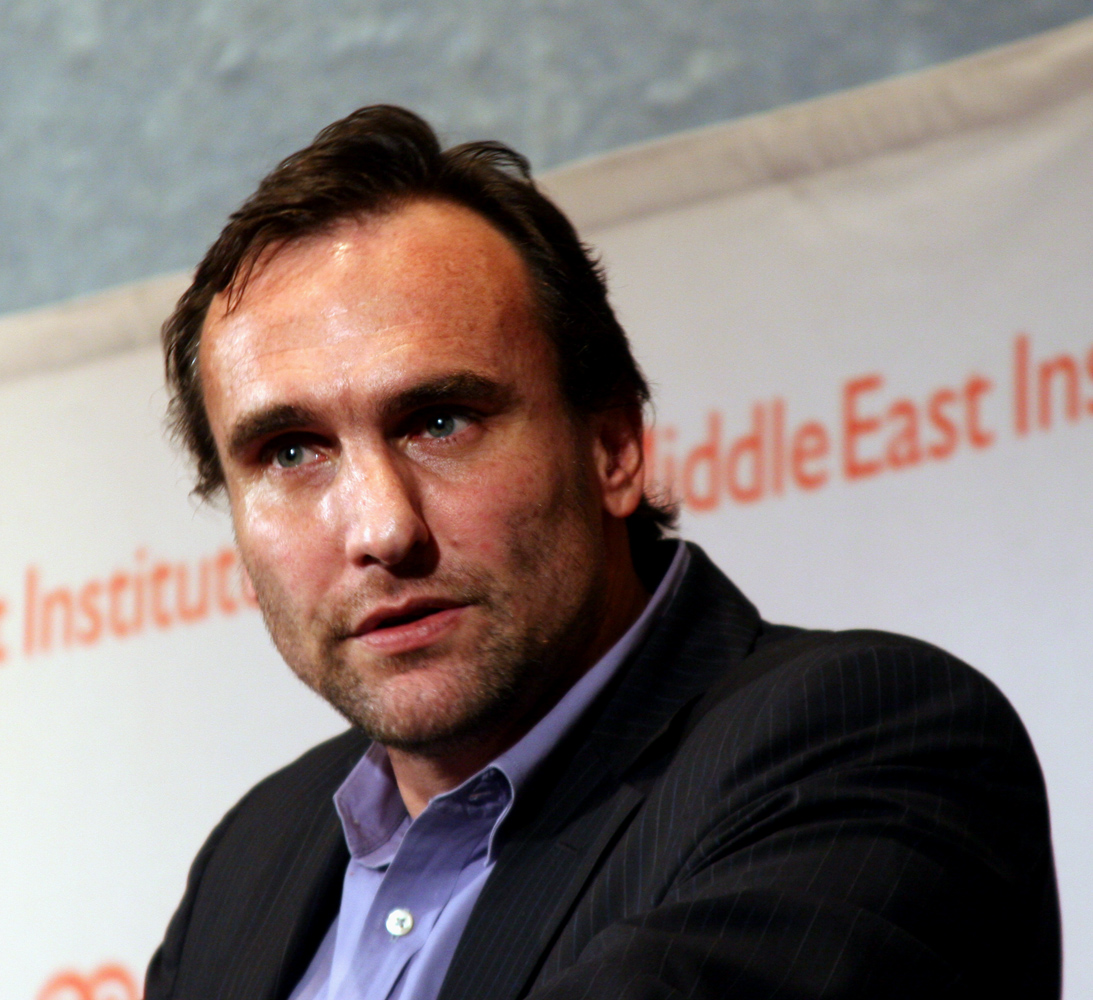
- Ware in 2007
- Born: 25 March 1969 (age 56); Brisbane, Queensland, Australia
- Occupation(s): Film director, journalist
- Website: mickware.info

Michael Ware (born 25 March 1969) is an Australian journalist formerly working in CNN and was for several years based in their Baghdad bureau. He joined CNN in May 2006, after five years with sister publication, Time. His last on-air appearance for the network was in December 2009.

He was one of the few mainstream reporters to live in Iraq near-continuously, since before the American invasion and gained early acclaim due to him establishing contacts with the Kurdish Peshmerga and the Iraqi insurgency. He reported on the severity of the growing opposition Western coalition forces faced in mid-2003, and his contacts provided him with controversial videotapes of attacks on coalition forces, including the murder of four Blackwater contractors. Ware has been embedded with American and British military forces on numerous occasions, and the coalition forces have been the focus of many of his reports describing conditions in Iraq.

As of 2015 he is working on a book about the Iraq War, titled Between Me and the Dead. The title comes from a conversation he had with a friend in the Marines; when asked how he deals with civilians and how many people he's killed, the Marine replied, "That's between me and the dead."

== Life and career ==
Michael Ware, a Brisbane, Australia native, graduated from Brisbane Grammar School. He holds a Bachelor of Laws and a degree in political science from the University of Queensland. Before entering journalism, he served as Associate to then-President of the Supreme Court of Queensland, Tony Fitzgerald. His journalism career began at The Courier-Mail in Brisbane from 1995 to 2000. During this time, Ware's investigative articles prompted an official investigation into the handling of a paedophile ring by the police, where he refrained from disclosing the sources of internal police documents he had received.

His earliest assignments for Time magazine took him to East Timor in 2000; and, in December 2001, he went into Afghanistan to cover the U.S. search for al-Qaeda. As preparations for the invasion of Iraq began in early 2003, Ware relocated to the Kurdistan area. Although he has gone into battles embedded with U.S. forces, he also travelled to insurgent camps and reported on their perspective of the war. His Time bylines include reports from Kabul, Kandahar, Fallujah, Tikrit, Tal Afar, Mosul, Samarra, Ramadi, and Baghdad.

In September 2004, while investigating reports that Abu Mousab al-Zarqawi's nascent "al-Qaeda in Iraq" group was openly claiming control of the Haifa Street area of Baghdad, Ware was briefly held at gunpoint by fighters loyal to Zarqawi who had pulled pins from live grenades and forced his car to stop. The men dragged him from the car and stood him beneath one of the banners, intending to film his execution with his own video camera. By threatening them with immediate and violent retaliation, his local guides, including members of the Ba'ath Party, were able to win his release. Ware has stated that, had this happened only a few months later, when Zarqawi's group had grown stronger, he would have been killed.

In October 2004, he was named Time magazine's Baghdad Bureau Chief. He was embedded for the September 2005 assault on Tal Afar, and his harrowing video of the battle has been included in a Frontline documentary and a 60 Minutes report. When with CNN, he was partnered with Thomas Evans, who produced for Anderson Cooper.

In August 2006, he spent three weeks in Beirut and the Bekaa Valley as part of CNN's team covering the Israeli invasion of Lebanon before returning to Iraq.

In October 2007, he covered the quadrennial Rugby World Cup for CNN Sports, reporting from Marseille and Paris.

In February 2008, he covered the parliamentary elections in Pakistan for CNN and hosted Pakistan's Vital Vote.

In April 2008, he hosted 30-minute special for CNN, Iraq: Inside the Surge.

In August 2008, he covered the South Ossetia War, between the Russian Federation and the Republic of Georgia, reporting at various times from the towns of Tbilisi, Gori, and Poti.

Beginning in early 2009, he began covering the Mexican drug cartels, reporting from Juárez and Mexico City.

In May 2010, he began a one-year leave of absence from CNN to be treated for post-traumatic stress disorder (PTSD).

In September 2010, the program Australian Story on the ABC network in Australia ran a two-part special on Ware's career.

In April 2011, he was added to the list of contributors to The Daily Beast and also wrote a column for Newsweek.

=== Only the Dead (2015) ===
In February 2011, Ware confirmed that he would not be returning to CNN. He later told an Australian newspaper that he has formed a film company, Penance Films, and has recently finished a documentary about his time in Iraq called Only the Dead, released in 2015.

Ware's film was featured at the Sydney Writers' Festival, where it won the Documentary Australia Foundation Award. The film also won the Walkley Documentary Award.

=== Iraq war reporting ===
On 10 November 2004, while Ware was attached to Staff Sergeant David Bellavia's platoon in Fallujah, they were ambushed while clearing a block of houses. Ware was present for, and also partially filmed the heroic actions that earned Bellavia the Medal of Honor. They were first documented in Ware's November 22, 2004 Time magazine cover story, "Into the Hot Zone", and the footage capturing the event is included in Ware's documentary Only the Dead.

On 18 October 2006, CNN aired a small portion of a videotape sent to Ware that showed snipers shooting at, and apparently killing, American troops. The video was a tape sent to CNN with Ware adding narration for the edited broadcast that showed American soldiers being stalked and eventually brought under fire by the shooters. After the news report was shown, White House Press Secretary Tony Snow accused CNN of "propagandizing" the American public. Representative Duncan Hunter, then-chairman of the House Armed Services Committee, asked Donald Rumsfeld to remove CNN embedded reporters following the airing of the news report, claiming that "CNN has now served as the publicist for an enemy propaganda film featuring the killing of an American soldier".

In 2008, he revealed that, while embedded in Diyala Province in 2007, he filmed the shooting of a young Iraqi man, whom he described as "a legitimate target", by U.S. soldiers. The shot did not initially kill the man, but no aid was rendered during the estimated 20 minutes it took him to die. Ware told the story to illustrate how dehumanising war is for military personnel as well as reporters.
