= Rule Breakers (film) =

- Theatrical release poster
- Directed by: Bill Guttentag
- Screenplay by: Elaha Mahboob; Jason Brown; Bill Guttentag
- Produced by: Samudrika Arora; Bill Guttentag; Laura Overdeck; Roya Mahboob; Elizabeth Schaeffer Brown
- Starring: Nikohl Boosheri; Noorin Gulamgaus; Amber Afzali; Nina Hosseinzadeh; Sara Malal Rowe; Mariam Saraj; Nasser Memarzia; Phoebe Waller-Bridge; Ali Fazal
- Cinematography: John Pardue
- Edited by: Hibah Schweitzer
- Music by: Jeff Beal
- Production companies: Slingshot Productions; Shape Pictures; Parallax Productions
- Distributed by: Angel Studios
- Release dates: February 12, 2025 (Los Angeles); March 7, 2025 (United States)
- Running time: 122 minutes
- Country: United States
- Language: English
- Budget: $8-15 million
- Box office: $3 million

Rule Breakers is a 2025 American drama film directed, written, and produced by Bill Guttentag. The film's story follows a visionary woman who sparks hope and opposition, in which their courage ignites a movement that could transform their nation forever.

The film premiered at the Linwood Dunn Theater on February 12, 2025, and was released in the United States on March 7, 2025.

== Synopsis ==
In a nation where educating girls is seen as rebellion, a visionary woman dares to teach young minds to dream. When their innovation draws global attention, their success sparks hope—and opposition. As threats loom and sacrifices are made, their courage and unity ignite a movement that could forever transform the world.

— Angel Studios

== Cast ==
- Nikohl Boosheri as Roya Mahboob
- Noorin Gulamgaus as Ali Mahboob
- Amber Afzali as Esin
- Nina Hosseinzadeh as Taara
- Sara Malal Rowe as Haadiya
- Mariam Saraj as Arezo
- Nasser Memarzia as Abdul
- Phoebe Waller-Bridge as Jessica Curie
- Ali Fazal as Samir Sinha

== Production ==
Rule Breakers was filmed in Marrakesh and Budapest.

== Reception ==
On the review aggregator website Rotten Tomatoes, 83% of 36 critics' reviews are positive, with an average rating of 6.6/10. The website's consensus reads: "Telling an inspiring story with straightforward sincerity, Rule Breakers grounds its uplift in solid performances and an empowering message." Metacritic, which uses a weighted average, assigned the film a score of 55 out of 100, based on 5 critics, indicating "mixed or average" reviews. Audiences polled by CinemaScore gave the film an average grade of "A" on an A+ to F scale.

== Release ==
In October 2024, Angel Studios acquired the film distribution rights. It first had its world premiere at the Linwood Dunn Theater at Los Angeles on February 12, 2025, and was later released to theaters across the United States, Canada, South Africa and Sri Lanka on March 7, 2025. The film made $1.5 million from 2,044 theaters in its opening weekend.
