= Crime & Punishment =

- Created by: Bill Guttentag; David Kanter; Dick Wolf
- Country of origin: United States
- Original language: English
- No. of seasons: 3
- No. of episodes: 26

Production
- Running time: 60 minutes
- Production companies: Wolf Films; Shape Pictures; Anonymous Content; Studios USA Television (2002) (season 1); Universal Television Distribution (2003–2004) (seasons 2–3)

Original release
- Network: NBC
- Release: June 16, 2002 – July 17, 2004

Crime & Punishment is a 2002 reality nontraditional court show spin-off of the Law & Order franchise. It premiered on NBC on June 16, 2002, and ran through the summers of 2002, 2003, and 2004. The show was produced by Bill Guttentag, who won an Academy Award for his documentary You Don't Have to Die.

== Description ==
In the criminal justice system, deputy district attorneys represent the people. The prosecutors you are about to see, and the cases they try, are real. Nothing has been reenacted.

— Opening narration spoken by Steven Zirnkilton

The series goes inside the District Attorney's office of San Diego County, California, as they prepared and tried cases. It involved going behind the scenes with the prosecutors as they prepared for the trial and provided three-camera coverage of the courtroom. Crime & Punishment has been described as a cross between a drama and a documentary or "docudrama". The series was created and executive produced by Wolf, along with Academy Award–winning documentary filmmaker Bill Guttentag. David J. Kanter is co-creator and executive producer, and follows prosecutors from the San Diego County District Attorney’s office as they investigate and try cases, while viewers see the drama unfold from real-life victims, prosecutors, family members and defendants.

The main theme was a remix of the Law & Order theme.

== Episode list ==
=== Season 1: 2002 ===
1. "People v. Dailey" / 2002.06.16
2. "People v. Jones" / 2002.06.23
3. "People v. Vasquez" / 2002.06.30
4. "People v. Sanabria" / 2002.07.07
5. "People v. Curry" / 2002.07.14
6. "People v. Scheirbaum & People v. Villa" / 2002.07.21
7. "People v. Taitano" / 2002.07.28
8. "People v. Garcia" / 2002.08.04
9. "People v. Kayser & People v. Palomino" / 2002.08.11
10. "People v. Wells" / 2002.08.18
11. "People v. Scott & People v. Smith" / 2002.08.25
12. "People v. Mayta" / 2002.09.01
13. "People v. Redondo" / Air date unknown

=== Season 2: 2003 ===
1. "People v. Richard Arnold" / 2003.06.01
2. "People v. Ron Barker/NY Nourn" / 2003.06.08
3. "People v. Clifford Smith" / 2003.06.15
4. "People v. Emile Robershaw" / 2003.06.22
5. "People v. Joseph Villarino" / 2003.06.29
6. "People v. Hugo Alcazar" / 2003.07.06
7. "People v. Delia Contreras" / 2003.07.13

=== Season 3: 2004 ===
1. "People v. George Waller Jr. & Lawrence Calhoun" / 2004.06.12
2. "People v. Brenda Cook & People v. Lawrence Marsh" / 2004.06.19
3. "People v. Bernard Cutts" / 2004.06.26
4. "People v. Terry Hall" / 2004.07.03
5. "People v. McPherson, Bubeck & People v. Chastang" / 2004.07.10
6. "People v. Tianna Thomas & People v. Charles Mambane" / 2004.07.17
