= You Don't Have to Die =

1988 film

- Directed by: Malcolm Clarke; Bill Guttentag
- Written by: Malcolm Clarke; Bill Guttentag
- Produced by: Malcolm Clarke; Bill Guttentag
- Starring: Jason Gaes
- Cinematography: Greg Andracke
- Edited by: Nancy Frazen
- Production company: Tiger Rose Productions
- Distributed by: HBO
- Release date: 1988
- Country: United States
- Language: English

You Don't Have to Die is a 1988 American short documentary film about a young boy (Jason Gaes) and his successful battle against cancer, directed by Malcolm Clarke and Bill Guttentag.

== Production ==
Some scenes were animated by John Canemaker.

== Accolades ==
In 1989, it won an Oscar for Documentary Short Subject at the 61st Academy Awards.

== Cast ==
- Jason Gaes as himself
- Adam Gaes as himself
- Craig Gaes as himself
- Geralyn Gaes as herself
- Melissa Gaes as herself
- Tim Gaes as himself
