= David Bellavia =

United States Army Medal of Honor recipient

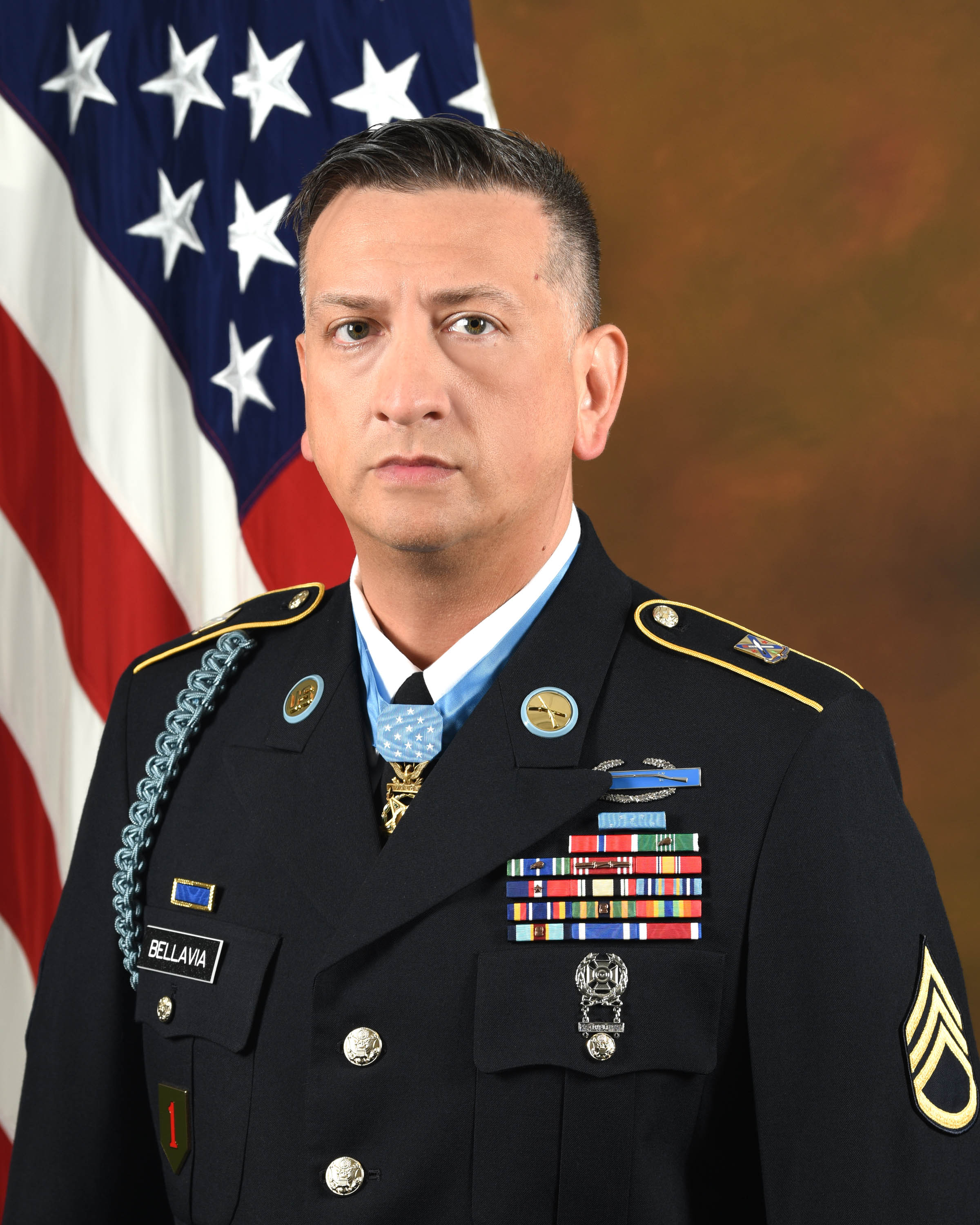
- Official portrait of Staff Sergeant Bellavia in 2019
- Born: November 10, 1975 (age 50); Buffalo, New York, United States
- Military career
- Allegiance: United States
- Branch: United States Army
- Service years: 1999–2005
- Rank: Staff sergeant
- Nickname: "Bell"
- Units: 2nd Battalion, 2nd Infantry Regiment, 1st Infantry Division
- Conflicts: Iraq War; Second Battle of Fallujah
- Awards: Medal of Honor; Bronze Star Medal; Army Commendation Medal (2)

David Gregory Bellavia (born November 10, 1975) is a former United States Army soldier who was awarded the Medal of Honor for his actions during the Second Battle of Fallujah. Bellavia has also received the Bronze Star Medal, two Army Commendation Medals, two Army Achievement Medals, and the New York State Conspicuous Service Cross. In 2005, Bellavia was inducted into the New York Veterans' Hall of Fame. He has subsequently been involved with politics in Western New York State.

== Military service ==
Bellavia enlisted in the United States Army in July 1999 and deployed to Iraq after serving in Kosovo.

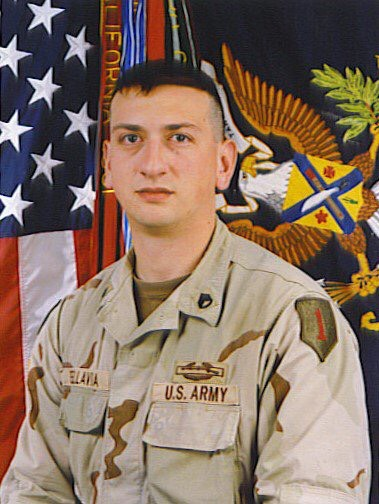
U.S. Army service photo

The actions for which Bellavia earned a Silver Star Medal took place on his 29th birthday. As a member of Company A, Task Force 2-2, 1st Infantry Division, his platoon was assigned during Operation Phantom Fury to clear a block of twelve buildings from which insurgents were firing on American forces. The platoon began searching house-to-house. At the tenth house, Bellavia fatally shot an insurgent preparing to load a rocket-propelled grenade. A second insurgent fired at him, and Bellavia wounded him in the shoulder. When Staff Sergeant Bellavia entered a bedroom, the wounded insurgent followed, forcing Bellavia to kill him. When another insurgent began firing from upstairs, Bellavia returned fire and killed him. A fourth insurgent then jumped out of a closet in the bedroom, yelling and firing his weapon as he leaped over a bed trying to reach Bellavia. The insurgent tripped and Bellavia wounded him. Bellavia chased the insurgent when he ran upstairs. He followed the wounded insurgent's bloody footprints to a room on the left and threw in a fragmentation grenade. Upon entering the room, Bellavia discovered it was filled with propane tanks and plastic explosives. He did not fire his weapon for fear of setting off an explosion and instead then engaged in hand-to-hand combat with the insurgent, which led to Bellavia killing the insurgent by stabbing him in the collarbone.

Bellavia's actions in Fallujah were first documented in the November 22, 2004 Time magazine cover story, "Into the Hot Zone", by journalist Michael Ware, who was attached with Bellavia's unit during the fight. Partial video capturing the event can be seen in Michael Ware's documentary Only the Dead.

After serving for six years, Bellavia left the service with the rank of staff sergeant in 2005.

On June 7, 2019, it was revealed to the media that Bellavia's Silver Star would be upgraded to the Medal of Honor. The Medal of Honor awarding ceremony took place at the White House on June 25, 2019, and was awarded to Bellavia by President Donald Trump. The ceremony was also attended by former members of Bellavia's platoon in Iraq.

== Awards and decorations ==
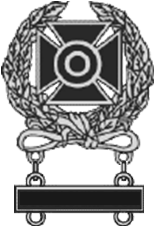
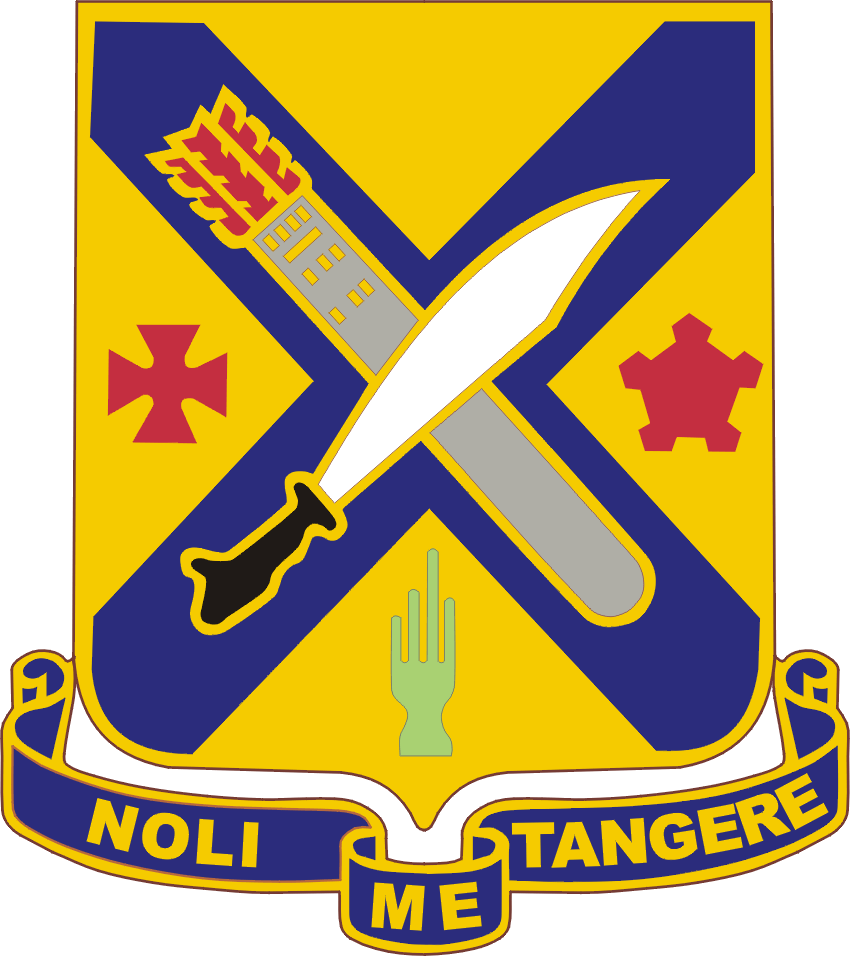
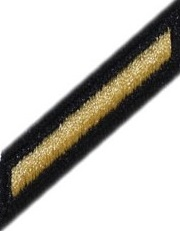
Combat Infantryman Badge
Expert Marksmanship Badge with rifle bar
1st Infantry Division Combat Service Identification Badge
2nd Infantry Regiment Distinctive Unit Insignia
2 Service stripes
2 Overseas Service Bars

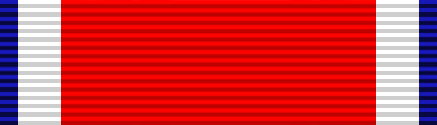
Medal of Honor
Bronze Star
Army Commendation Medal with one bronze oak leaf cluster
Army Achievement Medal with oak leaf cluster
Army Presidential Unit Citation
Army Good Conduct Medal (two awards)
National Defense Service Medal
Kosovo Campaign Medal with one bronze service star
Iraq Campaign Medal
Global War on Terrorism Expeditionary Medal
Global War on Terrorism Service Medal
Army NCO Professional Development Ribbon with bronze award numeral 2
Army Service Ribbon
Army Overseas Service Ribbon with award numeral 2
NATO Medal for Service in ex-Yugoslavia
New York State Conspicuous Service Cross

== Medal of Honor citation ==

President Donald J. Trump will award the Medal of Honor to David G. Bellavia for conspicuous gallantry while serving as a staff sergeant in the United States Army

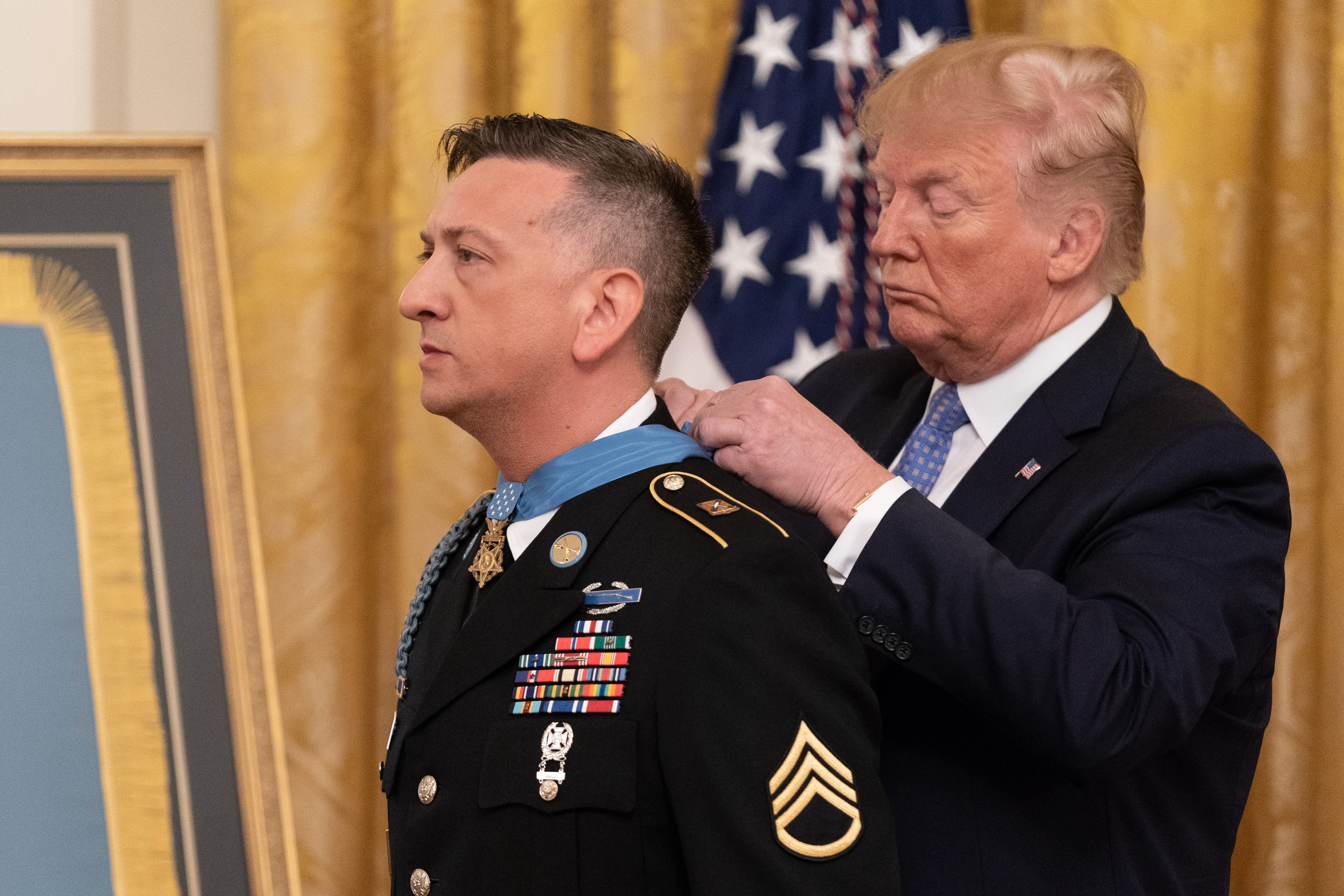
Bellavia receives the Medal of Honor from U.S. President Trump

The President of the United States of America, authorized by Act of Congress, March 3rd, 1863, has awarded in the name of Congress the Medal of Honor to Staff Sergeant David G. Bellavia, United States Army, for conspicuous gallantry and intrepidity at the risk of his life above and beyond the call of duty.

Staff Sergeant David G. Bellavia distinguished himself by acts of gallantry and intrepidity above and beyond the call of duty on November 10, 2004, while serving as squad leader in support of Operation Phantom Fury in Fallujah, Iraq.

While clearing a house, a squad from Staff Sergeant Bellavia's platoon became trapped within a room by intense enemy fire coming from a fortified position under the stairs leading to the second floor. Recognizing the immediate severity of the situation, and with disregard for his own safety, Staff Sergeant Bellavia retrieved an automatic weapon and entered the doorway of the house to engage the insurgents.

With enemy rounds impacting around him, Staff Sergeant Bellavia fired at the enemy position at a cyclic rate, providing covering fire that allowed the squad to break contact and exit the house.

A Bradley Fighting Vehicle was brought forward to suppress the enemy; however, due to high walls surrounding the house, it could not fire directly at the enemy position. Staff Sergeant Bellavia then re-entered the house and again came under intense enemy fire. He observed an enemy insurgent preparing to launch a rocket-propelled grenade at his platoon. Recognizing the grave danger the grenade posed to his fellow soldiers, Staff Sergeant Bellavia assaulted the enemy position, killing one insurgent and wounding another who ran to a different part of the house.

Staff Sergeant Bellavia, realizing he had an un-cleared, darkened room to his back, moved to clear it. As he entered, an insurgent came down the stairs firing at him. Simultaneously, the previously wounded insurgent reemerged and engaged Staff Sergeant Bellavia. Staff Sergeant Bellavia, entering further into the darkened room, returned fire and eliminated both insurgents. Staff Sergeant Bellavia then received enemy fire from another insurgent emerging from a closet in the darkened room.

Exchanging gunfire, Staff Sergeant Bellavia pursued the enemy up the stairs and eliminated him. Now on the second floor, Staff Sergeant Bellavia moved to a door that opened onto the roof. At this point, a fifth insurgent leapt from the third-floor roof onto the second-floor roof. Staff Sergeant Bellavia engaged the insurgent through a window, wounding him in the back and legs, and caused him to fall off the roof.

Acting on instinct to save the members of his platoon from an imminent threat, Staff Sergeant Bellavia ultimately cleared an entire enemy-filled house, destroyed four insurgents, and badly wounded a fifth. Staff Sergeant Bellavia's bravery, complete disregard for his own safety, and unselfish and courageous actions are in keeping with the finest traditions of military service and reflect great credit upon himself and the United States Army.

== Legacy and media ==
When Bellavia's Silver Star was upgraded to the Medal of Honor in 2019, he became the first living recipient to have a recorded Medal of Honor action. He is also only the second recipient to have their Medal of Honor action filmed, with the first being John A. Chapman who was posthumously awarded the Medal of Honor for his actions in Afghanistan in 2002. At the time of the action, Bellavia's Platoon was accompanied by Australian journalist Michael Ware who filmed the action from a downstairs doorway. Ware, who worked for Time and CNN at the time, wrote about the action for the cover story of the November 2004 edition of Time Magazine. It is unclear if the footage aired on CNN at the time, but it is prominently featured in Michael Ware's 2015 documentary Only The Dead.

A re-enactment of Bellavia's action is also depicted in season 2 episode 10 of The History Channel TV show Shootout!. However this aired in 2006, long before he was awarded the MoH so it is not mentioned in the episode.

== Subsequent career ==
Bellavia was Vice Chairman and co-founder of Vets for Freedom. He attended the 2006 State of the Union address as an honored guest. He currently is President of EMPact America, an American energy resiliency organization based in Elma, New York.

In 2007, Bellavia published a memoir, House to House: An Epic Memoir of War, co-written with John R. Bruning. In September 2010, the book was chosen as one of the top five best Iraq War memoirs by journalist Thomas Ricks (author of Fiasco). In 2012, Bellavia signed an agreement with 2012 Oscar-winning producer Rich Middlemas to make his memoir into a major motion picture.

Since leaving the United States Army, Bellavia has twice run for congress in New York's 26th congressional district. In 2008, he ran in the Republican primary to succeed retiring representative Tom Reynolds. Bellavia dropped out of the race before the Republican Party ballot was finalized and endorsed Republican Chris Lee, who went on to win the seat.

When Lee resigned from office in 2011, Bellavia again tried for the seat in the special election. State party officials endorsed State Assemblywoman Jane Corwin, so Bellavia launched an unsuccessful third-party bid, forming the "Federalist Party of New York" with political operatives that had previously been involved in the short-lived Taxpayers Party. The New York State Tea Party announced their displeasure with the Republican party's choice of Corwin, and hinted that they might back Bellavia's run, but the ruling of State Board of Elections that Bellavia's petition to be placed on the ballot was deficient ended his 2011 run. Bellavia, in turn, endorsed perennial candidate Jack Davis, who likewise had been spurned by the Republicans during the endorsement process and was running on a third-party candidacy backed by a competing Tea Party faction.

Bellavia was a candidate in the 2012 Republican primary for the since-renumbered 27th congressional district of New York. Bellavia competed against Chris Collins, the former county executive of Erie County, for the Republican nomination. Buoyed by the endorsements of four of the five GOP county committees that endorsed, Bellavia and Collins faced off in a June 26, 2012 primary. Collins won both the primary and the general election even though Bellavia won six of NY 27th Congressional District's eight counties.

Bellavia joined the staff of WBEN in late 2012 as a fill-in host and became the station's permanent late-night host in October 2013. Bellavia left the show on November 4, 2013. Bellavia co-hosted afternoons with Tom Bauerle from 2016 to 2019. He returned to WBEN in August 2020 as 9-to-noon host, succeeding Sandy Beach, who retired after 23 years with the station. Currently, Bellavia is working on his second book. He resides in western New York.

On August 11, 2018, Bellavia announced his candidacy for New York's 27th congressional district. The incumbent, Christopher Collins, had suspended his reelection campaign just hours earlier amidst federal indictments for insider trading and wire fraud. Bellavia withdrew from the race on August 21 after interviews, stating that he feared the electoral process would be corrupted by a court.

In October 2024, Bellavia joined 15 other Medal of Honor recipients in publicly endorsing Donald Trump for president.

== Personal life ==
He has three children. He is the youngest of four sons born to the late Dr. William Bellavia and Marilyn Brunacini.
