= Groomed (film) =

2021 film directed by Gwen van de Pas

- Official poster
- Directed by: Gwen van de Pas
- Produced by: Gwen van de Pas; Jason Blum; Bill Guttentag; Dylan Nelson
- Starring: Gwen van de Pas
- Cinematography: Mo Scarpelli; Rich Wong
- Edited by: Hibah Schweitzer
- Music by: Sieste van Gorkom
- Production companies: Blumhouse Television; Yellow Dot Films
- Distributed by: Discovery+
- Release date: March 18, 2021 (United States)
- Running time: 84 minutes
- Country: United States
- Language: English

Groomed is a 2021 American documentary film that was directed, produced and starred in by Gwen van de Pas, with Jason Blum serving as a producer under his Blumhouse Television banner. The film follows Van de Pas as she returns to her hometown in search of answers regarding the man who sexually abused her as a child and to understand more about grooming.

The film was released on March 18, 2021, by Discovery+.

== Synopsis ==
Gwen van de Pas returns to her home town in search of answers of the man who sexually abused her as a child, to understand more about grooming.

== Production ==
Gwen van De Pas left her job as a consultant in San Francisco to begin a documentary about sexual assault which occurred in her childhood while she was on a swim team. van de Pas spoke with multiple victims of assault and grooming with some appearing in the film to understand the process better and to feel less alone in the experience. In February 2021, it was announced Discovery+ would distribute the film, with Jason Blum serving as a producer on the film, under his Blumhouse Productions banner.

== Release ==
The film was released on March 18, 2021, by Discovery+.
