= Only the Dead =

2015 documentary film

- Directed by: Michael Ware; Bill Guttentag
- Written by: Michael Ware; Bill Guttentag; Justine A. Rosenthal
- Produced by: Michael Ware; Patrick McDonald
- Starring: Michael Ware
- Edited by: Jane Moran
- Music by: Michael Yezerski
- Release date: 2015
- Running time: 77 minutes
- Country: Australia
- Language: English

Only the Dead is a 2015 Australian documentary film on war correspondent Michael Ware. It explores his time in covering the Iraq War. It was built around footage that he took at the time on a second hand camera.

== Synopsis ==
The documentary begins in February 2003, directly prior to the American invasion of Iraq. War correspondent Michael Ware, working for Time magazine, has been sent to cover the Iraq War from the north. During this period, Ware, embedded with Kurdish fighters, films mortar fire and the aftermath of a suicide bombing that killed a journalist. After American forces capture Baghdad, Ware travels to the city and establishes himself at a Time magazine bureau.

Ware captures the aftermath of an incident involving a car containing a teenage boy and his brother. The boy was allegedly killed by an American soldier, and Ware captures footage of the surviving brother yelling at the camera, vowing to "do something big." Footage of armed resistance activities in Baghdad is shown.

Ware films the graphic aftermath of the Jordanian embassy bombing in Baghdad. Footage of the Canal Hotel bombing is also shown. The documentary follows with footage of American troops detaining a man suspected of planting an IED.

Ware indicates that he needed to make greater efforts to understand the individuals carrying out the frequent suicide bombings. Over time, he successfully builds relationships with insurgents, who begin sharing recordings of their military operations with him. He gains access to clandestine insurgent gatherings, though he admits to feeling apprehensive in their presence. Ware accompanies insurgents on an attack on a US base outside of a Baghdad airport. He expresses guilt watching the attack and fears American forces could see them clearly with night vision equipment. Ware reports that the insurgents claim they are not behind the suicide bombings, but instead attribute those attacks to Abu Musab al-Zarqawi's network.

Footage of American hostage Nick Berg's execution surfaces, and the widespread belief that Abu Musab al-Zarqawi is responsible gives him international notoriety. Zarqawi contacts deliver tapes to Ware at his hotel containing footage of various attacks on American soldiers throughout Iraq. Among this material is footage that documents a complete suicide bombing operation from the pre-attack ceremony to the explosion near an American checkpoint.

Ware travels to Haifa Street in Baghdad and films a child soldier. Other attacks on American forces in the area are shown. Ware returns to investigate the street after hearing that Zarqawi's men took control of it. His car is stopped by Zarqawi's men and Ware is almost executed, but his insurgent escort negotiates his release.

Ware is embedded with a group of American soldiers during the Second Battle of Fallujah. When the soldiers storm a house, they are ambushed and retreat outside. Sergeant David Bellavia enters the house with another soldier and Ware follows. Bellavia kills two insurgents, but without night vision, Ware loses the soldiers and retreats outside. After several minutes pass, Bellavia re-emerges, having killed several insurgents, including one in hand-to-hand combat.

Ware reports that some of his insurgent contacts decide to "resign from the terror network", and they kill a Zarqawi contact that they were working for. They give Ware the contact's hard drive. Recovered footage from the hard drive shows an Iraqi man accused of giving information to Americans being blindfolded and executed by several gunshots to the head, and alleged thieves being hung from a bridge in strappado and then shot.

Ware travels to Ramadi and is embedded with an American unit where he films several engagements. Footage of a suicide bombing involving a dump truck packed with explosives attacking an American outpost is shown.

The documentary then presents the aftermath of the 2006 al-Askari mosque bombing, which Ware attributes to an attempt by Zarqawi to stir sectarian violence. The film then shows footage of the airstrike that killed Zarqawi.

Ware is embedded in an American military unit south of Baqubah in April 2007. While there, Ware films an engagement with an insurgent. The insurgent is shot in the head during the firefight by American forces, and is mortally wounded. He is brought back to an American-controlled court yard. American soldiers find magazines in his pockets and an Iraqi man is heard saying that he works for Al-Qaeda. Ware films as the man slowly dies. He ponders why neither he nor the soldiers attempt to intervene to give the man medical aid, in spite of his mortal injuries. The film ends with Ware saying that at some point, "I became a man I never thought I'd be."

== Background ==
The film includes footage of Staff Sergeant David Bellavia’s actions during the Second Battle of Fallujah, for which he was later awarded a Medal of Honor.

== Reception ==
On review aggregator Rotten Tomatoes, the film has an approval rating of 88% based on 8 critic reviews.

Wendy Ide of The Guardian gave it 4 stars and wrote, "The story of how rookie war correspondent Ware found himself chosen by terrorist leader Abu Musab Al-Zarqawi to convey his message to the west is fascinating."

The Sydney Morning Herald's Philippa Hawker gave it 3 1/2 stars saying, "The film is a mixture of his own material, voice-over reflections and some newsreel footage of the time. Sometimes, his narration feels a little self-consciously rhetorical or vague; at other times, it's frank and raw."

== Awards ==
- 2015 Walkley Awards
  - Walkley documentary award - won
- 5th AACTA Awards
  - Best Direction in a Documentary - Michael Ware and Bill Guttentag - won
  - Best Editing in a Documentary - Jane Moran - won
  - Best Sound in a Documentary - Leah Katz, Andy Wright, Chris Goodes, Steve Burgess - won
  - Best Feature Length Documentary - Patrick McDonald and Michael Ware - nominated
