= Twin Towers (film) =

- Directed by: Bill Guttentag; Robert David Port
- Produced by: Kate Adler; Edward Barbini; Lisa Engel; Bill Guttentag; Peter Jankowski; Dan Sturman; Dick Wolf
- Starring: Tommy Buda
- Cinematography: Scott Hillier; Jefferson Miller
- Edited by: Michael Schweitzer
- Music by: Philip Marshall
- Production companies: MoPo Productions; Wolf Films; Universal Television; Shape Pictures
- Distributed by: Universal Pictures Home Entertainment
- Release date: 2002
- Running time: 34 minutes
- Country: United States
- Language: English

Twin Towers is a 2002 short documentary film directed by Bill Guttentag and Robert David Port, depicting the September 11, 2001 attacks on the World Trade Center.

== Summary ==
It is about two brothers, policeman Joseph Vigiano and fireman John Vigiano Jr., and their actions during the attacks. The footage started out as a reality television pilot from producer Dick Wolf (of Law and Order fame) before the attacks began eventually killing 14 members of the New York squad.

== Accolades ==
The film was awarded an Oscar for Best Documentary Short at the 75th Academy Awards, honoring films released in the year 2002.

== See also ==
- List of American films of 2002
- List of firefighting films
