= That Animal Rescue Show =

- Genre: Documentary
- Country of origin: United States
- Original language: English

Production
- Executive producers: Richard Linklater; Bill Guttentag; Nayeema Raza; Phil McGraw; Jay McGraw; Julia Eisenman
- Production companies: CBS Television Studios; Detour Filmproduction; Stage 29 Productions; 1891 Productions

Original release
- Network: CBS All Access
- Release: October 29, 2020

That Animal Rescue Show is an American documentary television series, which follows the animal rescue community in Austin, Texas. Richard Linklater, Bill Guttentag, and Phil McGraw serve as executive producers under their Detour Filmproduction, 1891 Productions, and Stage 29 Productions banners, respectively. It consisted of 10-episodes and premiered on October 29, 2020, on CBS All Access.

== Production ==
In January 2020, it was announced CBS All Access had ordered a 10-episode animal rescue documentary series to be produced by Richard Linklater, Bill Guttentag and Phil McGraw under their Detour Filmproduction, 1891 Production and Stage 29 Productions banners, respectively.

== Episodes ==
Ep #	Airdate	Title	Director
01	October 29, 2020	"A Discount Service Dog"	Bill Guttentag
02	October 29, 2020	"Pigs are People Too"	Richard Linklater
03	October 29, 2020	"A Body Positive Pig Pageant"	Richard Linklater
04	October 29, 2020	"Paws in Prison"	Bill Guttentag
05	October 29, 2020	"A Coyote Is Not the Same as a Dog""	Bill Guttentag
06	October 29, 2020	"We Don't Tell People Who to Love"	Bill Guttentag
07	October 29, 2020	"The Horse Episode"	Bill Guttentag
08	October 29, 2020	"Battitude"	Bill Guttentag
09	October 29, 2020	"Rescue Chicks"	Bill Guttentag
10	October 29, 2020	"Peppy & Sam"	Bill Guttentag
