= House to House =

2007 Iraq War memoir

House to House: An Epic Memoir of War
- Author: David Bellavia and John R. Bruning
- Published: 2007
- Publisher: Free Press
- Pages: 368, may vary to 347
- ISBN: 978-1416574712

House to House: A Soldier's Memoir is a 2007 memoir by Iraq War veteran and Medal of Honor recipient David Bellavia.

The secondary author is John R. Bruning, who also helped write the war memoir Outlaw Platoon (2012).

== Summary ==
House to House is an autobiography about the actions of Staff Sergeant David Bellavia during the second Battle of Fallujah. The book was released in 2007 and goes in-depth to describe the conditions of battle and the feelings that Bellavia experiences during the battle.

== Reviews ==
- "HOUSE TO HOUSE: An Epic Memoir of War." Kirkus Reviews 75.13 (July 2007): 640–640.
- "House to House: An Epic Memoir of War." Publishers Weekly 254.29 (23 July 2007): 61–61.
- Roberts, James C. "Iraq Veteran Details Horror and Heroism in Fallujah." Human Events 63.32 (24 Sep. 2007): 19–19.
- Douglas, Clint. "A Knife Under the Collarbone." Washington Monthly 39.9 (Sep. 2007): 55–57.
