= Bill Guttentag =

American film director

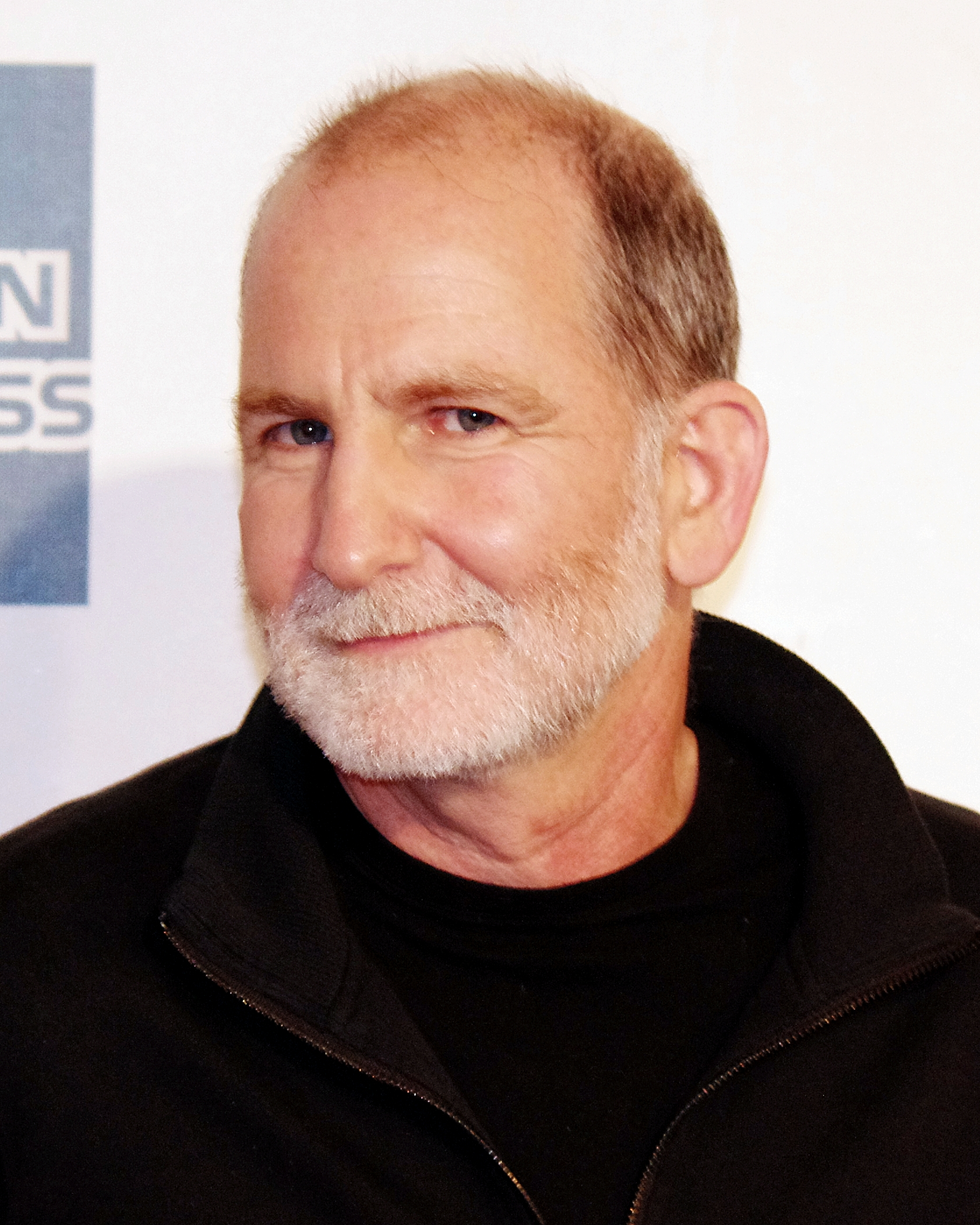
- Guttentag at the 2012 Tribeca Film Festival premiere of Knife Fight
- Born: United States
- Occupations: Film director, screenwriter, film producer

Bill Guttentag is an American dramatic and documentary film writer, producer, and director. His films have premiered at the Sundance, Cannes, Telluride and Tribeca film festivals, and he has won two Academy Awards.

== Career ==
Guttentag won an Oscar for Best Documentary Short Film with his 1988 HBO film You Don't Have to Die, telling the story of a boy's battle against cancer. Guttentag would receive three Oscar nominations before winning another Oscar for his 2002 documentary Twin Towers.

In 2007, Guttentag directed two films. The first was Live!, a mockumentary which premiered at Tribeca Film Festival, starring Eva Mendes, Andre Braugher, and David Krumholtz, among others. The second,Nanking, which premiered at the Sundance Film Festival, is a documentary about the Rape of Nanjing during the Second Sino-Japanese War. Nanking featured Woody Harrelson, Mariel Hemingway, Rosalind Chao, Stephen Dorff, and Jürgen Prochnow. It was shortlisted for an Academy Award, won awards at Sundance Film Festival and other film festivals, earned Guttentag a Writers Guild of America Award nomination for Best Documentary Screenplay. The film went on to become the highest grossing theatrical documentary in Chinese history. Nanking was nominated for 3 Emmy Awards and won one Emmy Award. The film also won a George Foster Peabody Award in 2009.

Guttentag directed, co-wrote and co-produced the dramatic feature Rule Breakers, which was theatrically released by Angel Studios in March 2025. The film stars Nikohl Boosheri, Ali Fazal, and Phoebe Waller-Bridge. The film opened in over 2000 US theatres and was followed by widespread international distribution. Rule Breakers received positive response from critics and audiences. The film had special screenings at Stanford University, Harvard Kennedy School, Yale University, the United Nations, and the UK Parliament.

Live! had its American premiere at the Tribeca Film Festival and its international premiere at the Deauville Film Festival, and was distributed in the US by The Weinstein Company and produced by Charles Roven and Atlas Entertainment. The film had widespread international distribution which included Lions Gate Entertainment (UK) and Pretty Pictures (France).

Guttentag partnered with Richard Linklater on That Animal Rescue Show, on which they were executive producers and directors. The 10-part series, made for CBS All Access, premiered in October 2020 on Paramount+. An episode from the series was part of the official selection of the 2020 Telluride Film Festival.

Guttentag created and executive produced the NBC series Crime & Punishment, which ran for three seasons, 2002–2004. Guttentag was also a director on the series. The show, a non-fiction spin-off of the Law & Order franchise, followed District Attorneys in San Diego County, California. The series was created with Dick Wolf, who was also an executive producer.

His novel Boulevard, was published by Pegasus Books/W. W. Norton in 2011, and the French edition was published by Éditions Gallimard (2013), where it was a finalist for the Grand Prix de Littérature Policière. He also co-wrote Masters of Disaster: The Ten Commandments of Damage Control, with Democratic political consultant Chris Lehane, which was published in December 2012 by Palgrave Macmillan. He has also written op-ed pieces for The Wall Street Journal and the Los Angeles Times.

Guttentag also directed Soundtrack for a Revolution, a film about music and the Civil Rights movement. The film features performances by John Legend, Joss Stone, and The Roots, among others. Soundtrack for a Revolution had its international premiere at the 2009 Cannes Film Festival, and its U.S. premiere at Tribeca. The film was produced and distributed internationally by Wild Bunch and released theatrically in the U.S. by Area 23a, and later aired on PBS. Guttentag was nominated for WGA, Producers Guild, and a Humanitas Award for the film, which also won awards at US and international film festival, and was short-listed for an Academy Award.

Guttentag's film, Knife Fight, which he directed and also wrote (with political consultant Chris Lehane), stars Rob Lowe, Jamie Chung, Julie Bowen, Carrie-Anne Moss, David Harbour, Eric McCormack, Jennifer Morrison, Michelle Krusiec, and Saffron Burrows. The film is about a Democratic political consultant and was released by IFC Films in January 2013. The film premiered at the 2012 Tribeca Film Festival, and also had special screenings at the 2012 Democratic National Convention and the John F. Kennedy School of Government.

Guttentag has directed commercials and other work and been an advisor for a number of Silicon Valley companies, including Google, Yahoo!, Mattermost and MasterClass. He has been an advisor to MasterClass since before the company’s launch and he directed the premiere class with author James Patterson. He also directed the third class with tennis star Serena Williams.

He has directed 8 films for HBO or Cinemax, including Nanking and Only the Dead. He has also directed films for ABC, CBS, National Geographic, and others.

Guttentag produced Groomed (Blumhouse, 2021), which premiered on Discovery+, and directed and produced Sublime (Interscope) and premiered at Tribeca in 2019.

His film Only the Dead premiered at the 2015 Telluride Film Festival and premiered on HBO in March 2016. The film won the Australian Documentary Prize at the Sydney Film Festival. He also won an AACTA Award (Australian Academy Award) for Best Directing for a Documentary, and a Walkley Award (Australian Pulitzer) for the film. The film was nominated for an Emmy Award in 2017.

Guttentag has served on a number of film festival juries, including Shanghai International, Odesa International, and Morelia International. His films have won awards at a number of U.S. and international film festivals including Sundance, Hong Kong, Morelia, Vancouver, Rwanda, Aspen, Washington D.C. Chicago, and others.

Guttentag has shown his films and given lectures at many U.S. and international universities, including: Yale; Harvard Kennedy School; the University of California, Berkeley; Princeton University; Vanderbilt University; University of California, Los Angeles; the University of Pennsylvania; Peking University; Tsinghua University; Fudan University; Kyoto University; the Hong Kong Academy of Performing Arts; HEC Paris; and the Freie Universität Berlin.

== Accolades ==
Guttentag's films have been selected for Sundance three times, Tribeca five times, Telluride twice, and have won awards at numerous American and international film festivals. They have also received a number of special screenings internationally and in the US, including at the Museum of Modern Art in New York; The United Nations; the Stanford Law School; the Harvard Kennedy School; The Academy of Motion Picture Arts and Sciences; The Council on Foreign Relations; the Paley Center for Media; Film at Lincoln Center, and the White House.

Guttentag has received two Academy Awards, three additional Academy Award nominations, a Peabody Award, three Emmy Awards, two additional Emmy nominations, two Writers Guild Award nominations, a Huminatas Prize nomination, a Producers Guild Award nomination, and a Robert F. Kennedy Journalism Award.

== Education and University teaching career ==
Guttentag received a B.A. degree from the University of Pennsylvania and was a fellow at the American Film Institute. He later was a John S. Knight Fellow at Stanford University

He has taught at the Hasso Plattner Institute of Design at Stanford (d.school).

Guttentag has been a lecturer at the Stanford Graduate School of Business since 2001.

== Selected filmography ==
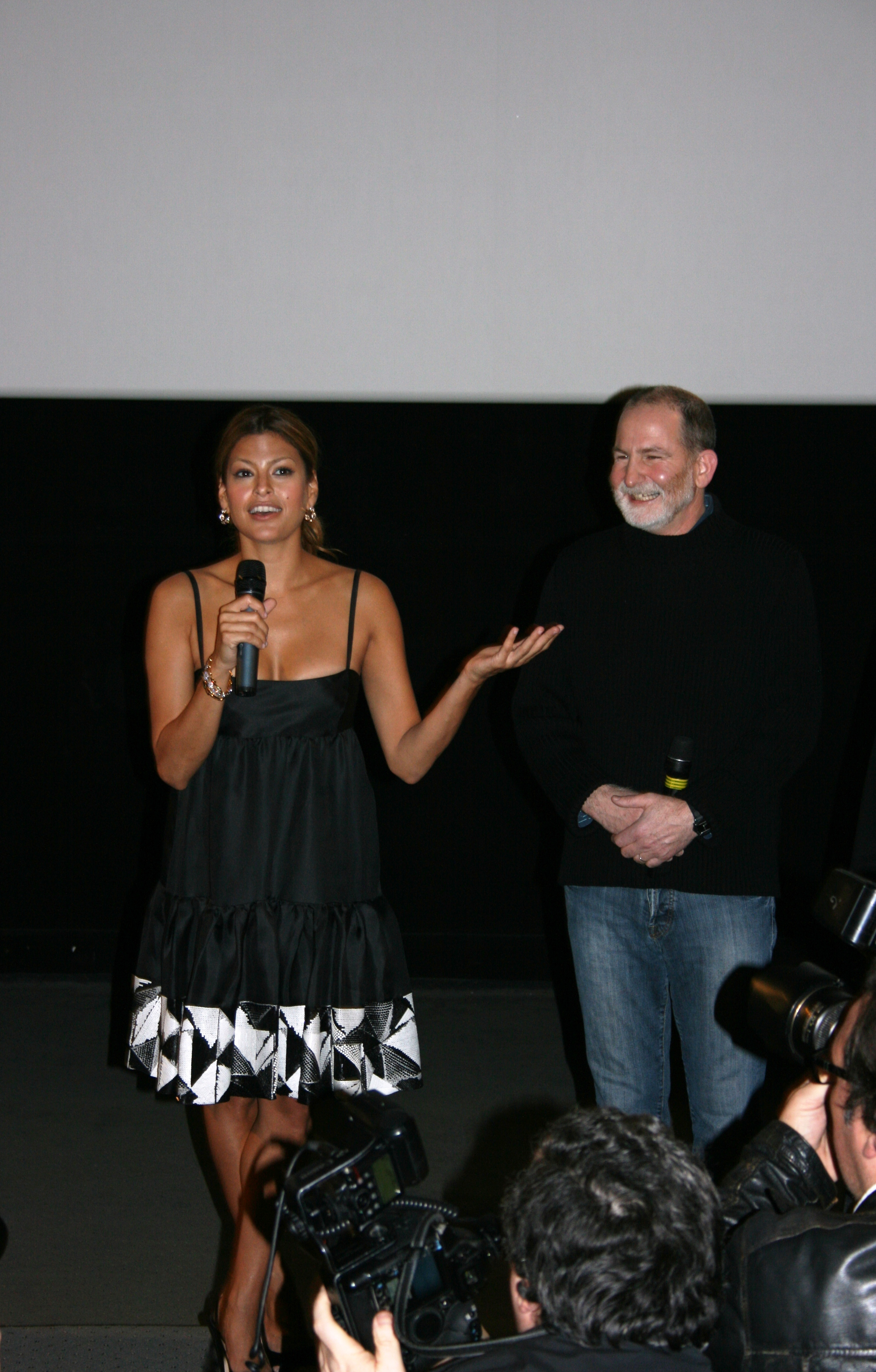
Eva Mendes and Guttentag at the preview showing of Live! in Paris (January 2008)

- You Don't Have to Die (1988)
- Crack USA: County Under Siege (1989)
- The Cocaine War: Lost in Bolivia (1992)
- Assassinated: the Last Days of Kennedy and King (1998)
- Crime & Punishment (2002)
- Twin Towers (2002)
- Live! (2007)
- Nanking (2007)
- Soundtrack for a Revolution (2009)
- Knife Fight (2012)
- Only the Dead (2015)
- Sublime (2019)
- That Animal Rescue Show (2020)
- Groomed (2021)
- Spyral (2024)
- Rule Breakers (2025)
