= Ida Random =

American production designer

- Born: 1945 (age 80–81)
- Occupation: Production designer
- Years active: 1983-present

Ida Random (born 1945) is an American production designer. She was nominated for an Academy Award in the category Best Art Direction for the film Rain Man.

== Selected filmography ==
- The Big Chill (1983)
- Body Double (1984)
- Silverado (1985)
- Who's That Girl (1987)
- Rain Man (1988)
- The War of the Roses (1989)
- Hoffa (1992)
- The Fan (1996)
- The Postman (1997)
- Spanglish (2004)
- The Fast and the Furious: Tokyo Drift (2006)
- Fast & Furious (2009)
- No Strings Attached (2011)
- Chasing Mavericks (2012)
