= List of appearances of Monument Valley in the media =

Monument Valley, located on the Navajo Nation within Arizona and Utah, has been featured in many forms of media since the 1930s. It is perhaps most famous for its use in many John Ford films, such as Stagecoach (1939) and The Searchers (1956). It has also been featured in such films as Easy Rider (1969), directed by and co-starring Dennis Hopper; Forrest Gump (1994), directed by Robert Zemeckis, and The Eiger Sanction (1975), directed by and starring Clint Eastwood; and in two episodes of the popular United Kingdom television show Doctor Who: "The Impossible Astronaut" (23 April 2011) and "Day of the Moon" (30 April 2011).

The twin buttes of Monument Valley ("the Mittens"), the "Totem Pole", and the "Ear of the Wind" arch, among other features, have developed iconic status. They have appeared in many television programs, commercials, and Hollywood movies, especially Westerns.

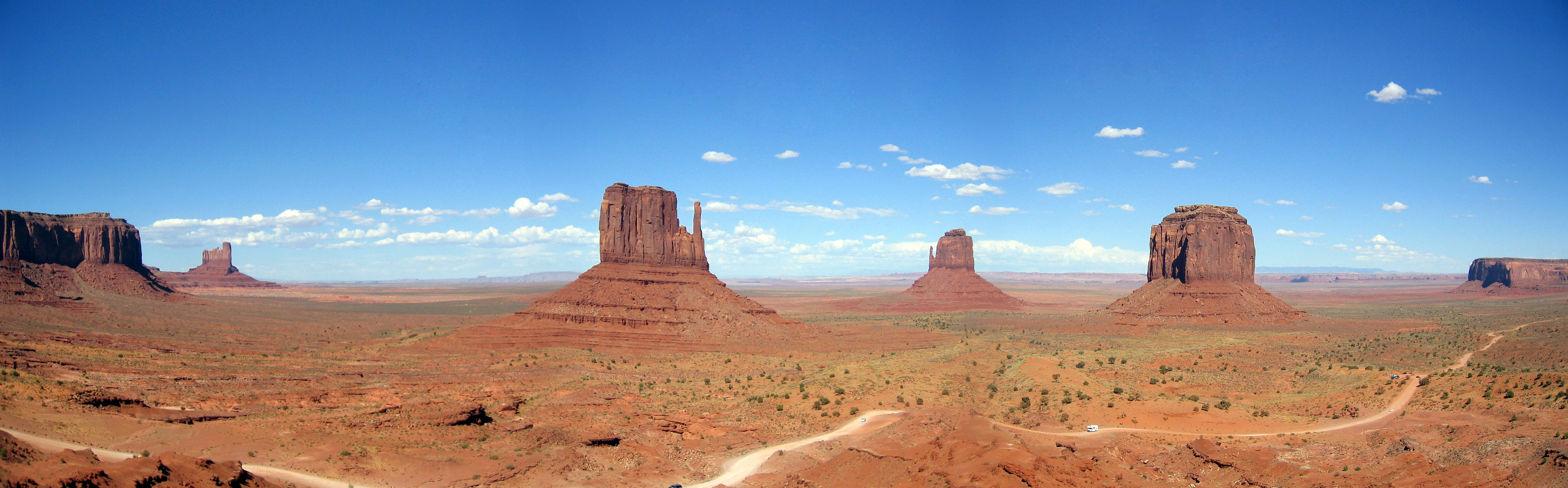
Monument Valley Panorama, taken from the Visitor Center and showing "the Mittens", Merrick Butte and the road which makes a loop-tour through the Park

== Motion pictures ==
=== Films ===
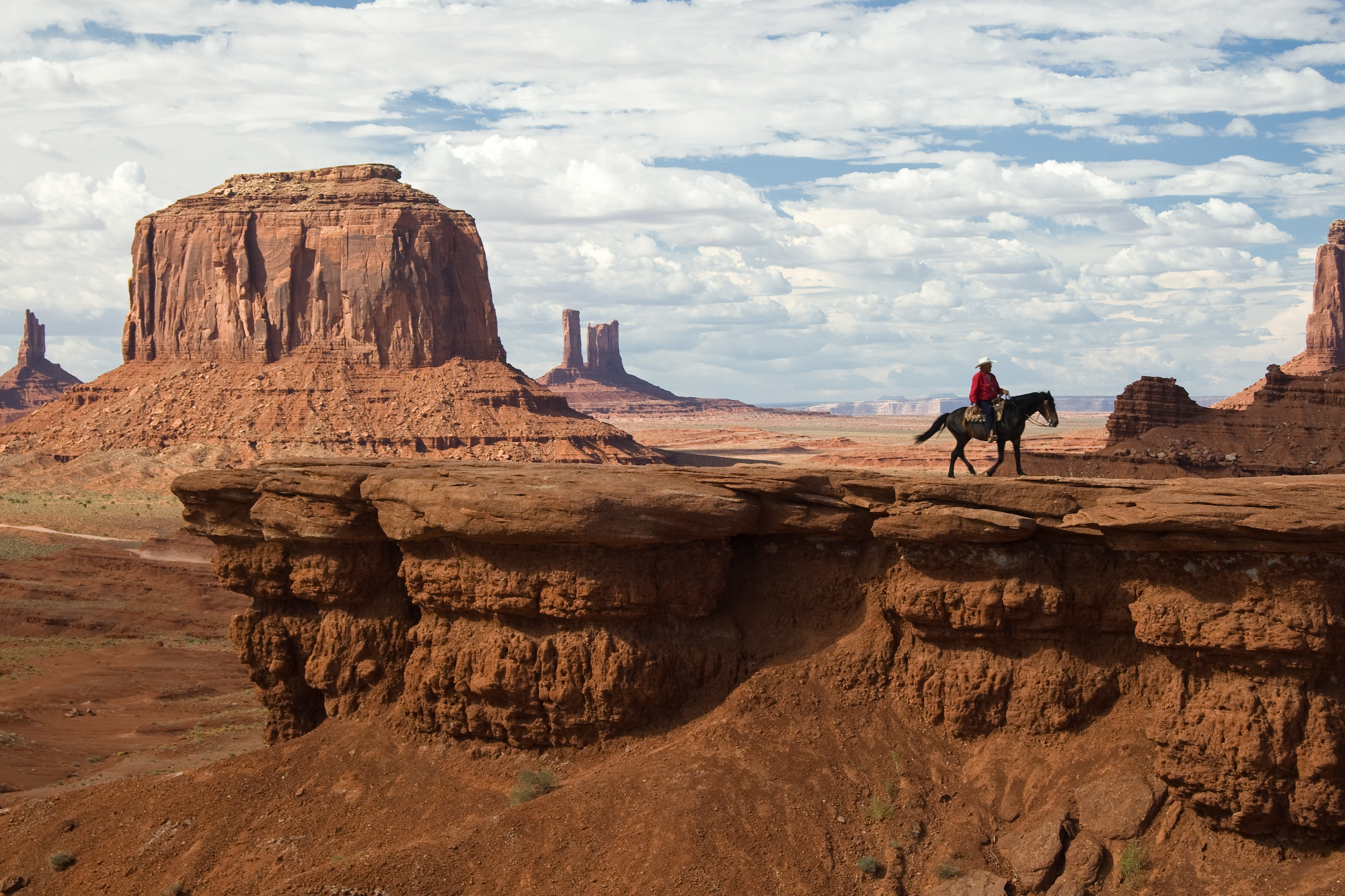
John Ford's Point in Monument Valley Navajo Tribal Park

- The Vanishing American (1925)
- The Lone Star Ranger (1930)
- Stagecoach (1939), directed by John Ford and starring John Wayne, has had an enduring influence in making the Valley famous. After that first experience, Ford returned nine times to shoot Westerns — even when the films were not set in Arizona or Utah (see The Searchers, set in Texas, but filmed here). A popular lookout point is named in his honor as "John Ford's Point". It was used by Ford in a scene from The Searchers where an American Indian village is attacked.
- Kit Carson (1940)
- Billy the Kid (1941)
- King of the Stallions (1942)
- The Harvey Girls (1946)
- My Darling Clementine (1946) by John Ford.
- Angel and the Badman (1947)
- Fort Apache (1948) by John Ford.
- Laramie (1949)
- She Wore a Yellow Ribbon (1949) by John Ford.
- The Living Desert (1953)
- The Searchers (1956) by John Ford.
- Sergeant Rutledge (1960) by John Ford.
- How The West Was Won (1962)
- Cheyenne Autumn (1964) by John Ford.
- The Greatest Story Ever Told (1965)
- 2001: A Space Odyssey (1968), directed by Stanley Kubrick, features scenes in African deserts as well as footage of Monument Valley which is used as the surface of an alien planet to which protagonist Dave Bowman travels through a stargate.
- Once Upon a Time in the West (1968), directed by Sergio Leone, although shot for the most part in Spain and Italy, features two scenes shot on location in Monument Valley. Ruins of the stone arch set in the flashback scene can still be seen.

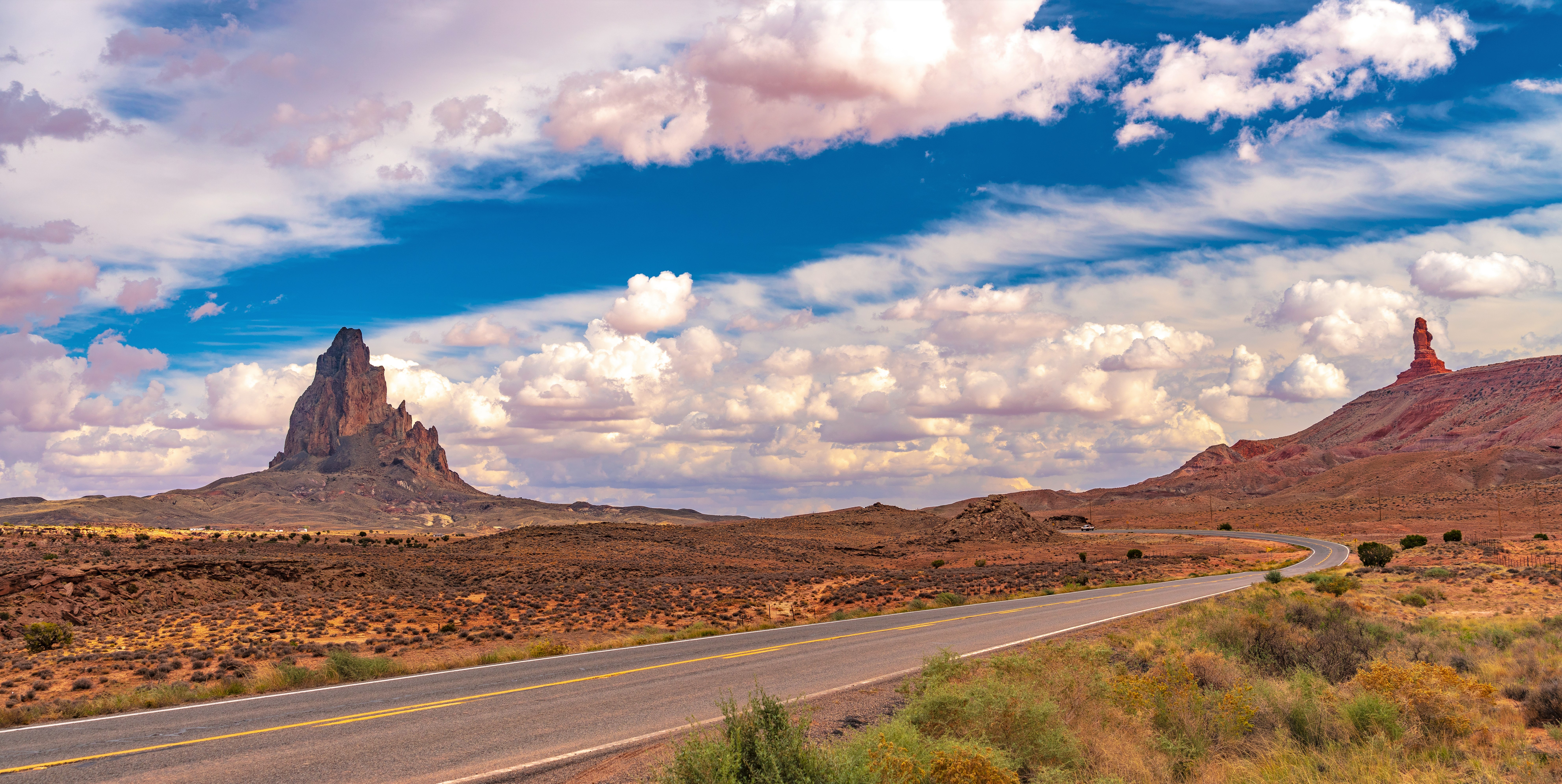
US163 between Agathla Peak and Owl Rock as seen in Easy Rider

- Easy Rider (1969), directed by and co-starring Dennis Hopper as buckskin-clad Billy, is one of the first movies to pay homage to John Ford Country in a contemporary setting, riding motorcycles past Agathla Peak and Owl Rock before showing the Monument Valley buttes at dawn.
- Mackenna's Gold (1969)
- Un homme qui me plaît (1969)
- The American West of John Ford (TV Documentary) (1971)
- Wild Rovers (1971)
- Electra Glide in Blue (1973), starring Robert Blake as a motorcycle cop in Arizona, was filmed in Monument Valley.
- A Genius, Two Partners and a Dupe (1975)
- The Eiger Sanction (1975), directed by Clint Eastwood, was partly filmed in Monument Valley; both Eastwood and George Kennedy were filmed on top of the Totem Pole, which has been off-limits to climbers since the movie was filmed here.
- Joshua (1976)
- The Villain (aka Cactus Jack) (1979)
- Wanda Nevada (1979)
- The Legend of the Lone Ranger (1981)
- Koyaanisqatsi (1982), a documentary film directed by Godfrey Reggio, features footage of Monument Valley.
- The Fabrizio De Angelis action film Thunder Warrior (1983) was shot entirely in Monument Valley and in nearby Page, Arizona.
- Harold Ramis' film National Lampoon's Vacation (1983) features footage of Monument Valley.
- Ron Fricke's IMAX film Chronos (1985) features several scenes of the Monument Valley landscape.
- In Back to the Future Part III (1990), Marty McFly drives from 1955 to 1885 from a drive-in theatre set at the Valley's base.
- Ridley Scott's 1991 film Thelma & Louise features some shots of Monument Valley, as well as Canyonlands National Park, in its latter half.
- An American Tail: Fievel Goes West (1991)

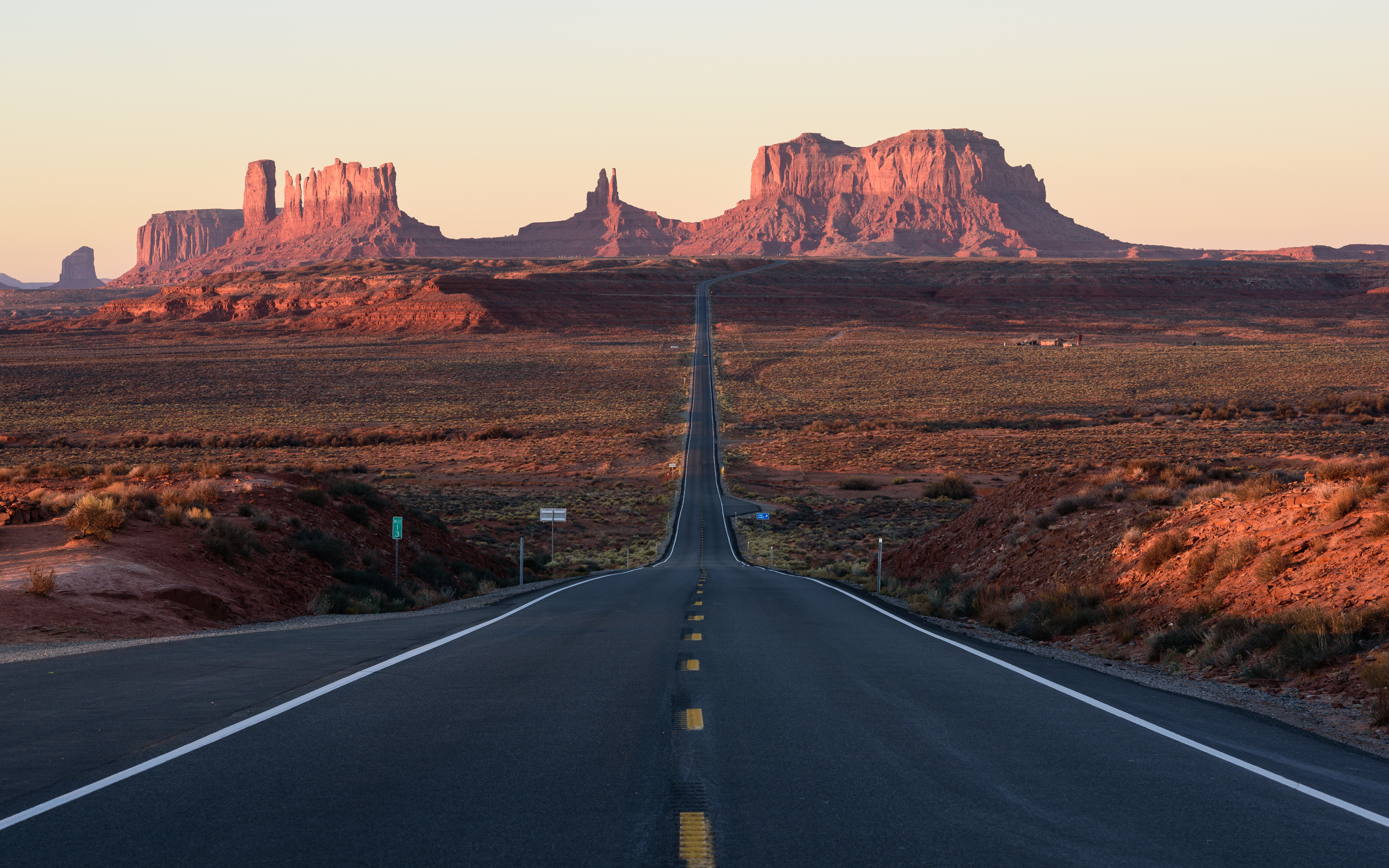
The location along U.S. Route 163 where Forrest Gump ends his run, with Monument Valley in the background

- In Forrest Gump (1994), Forrest ends his cross-country run here. He is running north on U.S. Route 163 before he stops running.
- Lightning Jack (1994)
- Paramount Pictures 1994 film Pontiac Moon featured this location as part of the roadtrip.
- The Sunchaser (1996) features the site
- Wild America (1997) features scenes of Monument Valley.
- The Return of Navajo Boy (2000), a documentary about uranium contamination of Navajo lands, was shot largely in Monument Valley where its central characters live. Additionally, the film deconstructs historical media depictions of Navajos and the land where they live (including Monument Valley).
- The opening scene of Vertical Limit (2000) features several rock climbers in Monument Valley.
- The opening song of the Telugu Film Takkari Donga (2002) features Monument Valley.
- In Windtalkers (2002), the opening and closing scenes are filmed in Monument Valley.
- In Cars (2006), a spoof of Monument Valley called "Ornament Valley" is shown as a once-popular side trip for cars entering Radiator Springs from U.S. Route 66. In keeping with the automotive theme of the film, the peaks are shaped like the hood ornaments of cars. A map shown in a flashback places Radiator Springs in a Peach Springs, Arizona-like position with respect to US66/I-40, but depicts the valley as local instead of 175 miles further north at the edge of the state.
- Alex Cox's film Searchers 2.0 (2007) is about a road trip to Monument Valley. The final scenes feature a rare depiction of the area covered in snow.
- Jacques Mesrine and his mistress were arrested near Monument Valley in the film Mesrine (2008).
- Location sequences for the documentary Reel Injun (2009), on the history of Native Americans in the movies.
- The Lone Ranger (2013) filmed numerous scenes in Monument Valley.
- In The LEGO Movie (2014) it is depicted in the early part of the movie
- A Million Ways to Die in the West (2014) was partially shot on location in Monument Valley.
- In Transformers: Age of Extinction (2014) the scene in which the surviving Autobots reunite was shot in Monument Valley.
- The Monument Valley is featured in the Disney theme park attraction, Soarin Around the World (2016).
- Fantastic Beasts and Where to Find Them (2016)
- Jurassic World: Fallen Kingdom (2018) - One of the ending scenes shows a convoy of trucks, one of which contains an Allosaurus traveling through Monument Valley.
- In the opening scene of The Ballad of Buster Scruggs (2018), a film written and directed by the Coen Brothers.

=== Print ===
- In the manga Bio Booster Armor Guyver, the global headquarters of the Cronos organization is concealed within a hollowed-out butte in Monument Valley.
- Garth Ennis' Preacher series of comic books features a scene in which the Valley is destroyed by a massive nuclear weapon in an attempt to destroy the Saint of Killers.
- George Herriman's Krazy Kat cartoon strip used Monument Valley as a setting.
- The book cover for Ghost Rider: Travels on the Healing Road (2002), by Neil Peart of the band Rush, shows a picture that Neil took of his motorcycle in Monument Valley.
- Monument Valley features prominently as a destination in the 2023 science fiction novel The Road to Roswell, by Connie Willis.

=== Television ===
- The rugged desert scenery for the Coyote and Road Runner (1949-) cartoons takes much of its inspiration from Monument Valley.
- In the 1978 Super Friends episode "The Pied Piper from Space", alien space ships abduct children, including the Wonder Twins, and they board the spaceships at Monument Valley.
- In the 1980s American action/espionage television series Airwolf, a hollowed butte is portrayed as the secret hiding place ("The Lair") of the eponymous high-tech military helicopter. Monument Valley is renamed the "Valley of the Gods" in this series. The actual Valley of the Gods is a few miles north in Utah. The shots of The Lair were actually a mix of matte paintings and shots from three locations within close proximity of each other.
- The MacGyver episode "Eagles" (Season 2, Episode 8) has shots in the Valley. MacGyver is gathering eggs from an eagle's nest on top of a butte.
- In their final television series De Reis vol Verrassingen, the Dutch duo Bassie en Adriaan spend an entire episode in Monument Valley. Among other things, clown Bassie performs a rain dance in front of The Three Sisters.
- In the made-for-TV movie 10.5: Apocalypse, Monument Valley is flooded from seismic activity.
- The 2011 Doctor Who episodes "The Impossible Astronaut" and "Day of the Moon" contain sequences shot in Monument Valley (although not in the exact location given in the episode). This was the first time Doctor Who has filmed principal photography on location in America. Past episodes that take place in America were never shot in the US, including the 1996 TV film which takes place in San Francisco but was shot in Vancouver. Monument Valley was previously used as a CSO background for the planet Metebelis Three in Planet of the Spiders, though this was achieved using a photograph.
- In a 2014 Adult Swim bump Monument Valley was shown with lights going through the trails.
- Numerous scenes from the HBO series Westworld were filmed in Monument Valley.
- Monument Valley appears in the third-season premiere of the television adaptation of The Man in the High Castle, titled "Now More Than Ever, We Care About You." In this alternate history, the Empire of Japan tests an atomic bomb there.

== Advertising ==
- The implied association with John Wayne's tough, macho character made the buttes a natural choice as the background for the Marlboro Man in the marketing of Marlboro-brand cigarettes from the 1950s.
- R.J. Reynolds Tobacco Company used the valley in a print advertisement for Winston cigarettes. Jeffrey K. Stine, a curator at the National Museum of American History, argues that by placing a pack of Winston cigarettes in the midst of a natural landscape in the United States, the company was attempting to portray Winston as an "unquestionable American brand" and imply that their cigarettes were "both liberating and healthy".

== Photography ==
- A Monument Valley photo was used in Windows Vista Beta 2 as wallpaper.
- Fashion magazine Harper's Bazaar used Monument Valley as a backdrop for a fashion editorial shot by Yasuhiro Wakabayashi for the January 1969 issue.

== Games ==
- The video game AeroWings for the Dreamcast console has a stage set in Monument Valley.
- In the video game F29 Retaliator, the American Desert area includes a base set in Monument Valley.
- Bone County featured in GTA: San Andreas is based on Monument Valley.
- The PlayStation 3 video game MotorStorm released in 2007 is an aggressive off-road racing game set in Monument Valley.
- In the video game Need for Speed: Shift and its sequel Shift 2: Unleashed, the fictional track Ambush Canyon is situated in a region strikingly similar to Monument Valley.
- There is a stage that features Monument Valley in the video game Tekken.
- In the video game The King of Fighters '96, the Art of Fighting Team stage is set in Monument Valley.
- In the video game Red Dead Redemption, the region Diez Coronas, Nuevo Paraiso strongly resembles Monument Valley.
- In the video game Counter-Strike, the outside of the map fy_pool_day resembles Monument Valley.
- Monument Valley appears along US Route 160 in the 18 Wheels of Steel series.
- The video game Monument Valley for Windows Phone, Android, and iOS, is a puzzle game with several references to the actual valley.
- Monument Valley appears as a secret base for S.T.E.A.M. in the Nintendo 3DS game Code Name: S.T.E.A.M..
- Horizon Zero Dawn partly takes place in Monument Valley.
- In the game, Beyond Two Souls, the mission titled "Navajo" takes place in Monument Valley.
- In Sonic Mania, the zone "Mirage Saloon" has depictions of Monument Valley in the level's backgrounds as well as in the textures of its second act.

== Music ==
- French band Air's 2001 album, 10 000 Hz Legend, features Monument Valley on its cover and throughout the LP's artwork.
- American band Drive-By Truckers' 2008 CD, Brighter Than Creation's Dark ends with "The Monument Valley", a song with references to film making and movie director John Ford.
- Rock band Eagles used Monument Valley on the cover of their 1985 UK Best of album. It shows the U.S. Route 163 heading south towards the East and West Mittens
- The 2003 Led Zeppelin DVD features the West Mitten of Monument Valley on the cover.
- Lynyrd Skynyrd's Album Twenty is a fictional picture of the mittens
- The video for "I Disappear" by Metallica was partially shot in Monument Valley. The song was featured on the soundtrack to Mission: Impossible 2.
- The cover of American Water by the Silver Jews is a stylised painting of Monument Valley by Chris Kysor.
- Avant-Garde composer Buckethead depicts the valley in the cover and title of his album Monument Valley.
- Rock band Soulfly shot their music video "Prophecy" in Monument Valley.
- Al Stewart's 1978 album Time Passages uses the best-known view of the Valley on its cover.
- The cover of Christian rock group Petra's 1989 album Petra Praise: The Rock Cries Out shows the band posing on top of one of the rock formations in Monument Valley.
- Panoramas of Monument Valley were frequently shown in Kanye West's music video Bound 2 in November 2013.
- Panic! at the Disco's music video for their 2015 single Hallelujah references the game, Monument Valley.
- Post rock band Valley of the Giants uses imagery from Monument Valley on the cover of their 2004 eponymous album.
- The Folk Rock band The Byrds features the valley in the counter cover of their album Untitled.
- Lovers On The Sun by DJ producer David Guetta and singer Sam Martin features on its cover photo and lyric video images from Monument Valley.
- American new age musician Eric Tingstad's 2012 album, Badlands, features Monument Valley on its cover.
