= Crime and Punishment U.S.A. =

1959 American crime drama film

- Directed by: Denis Sanders
- Screenplay by: Walter Newman
- Based on: Crime and Punishment; 1866 novel by Fyodor Dostoyevsky
- Produced by: Terry Sanders
- Starring: Mary Murphy; Frank Silvera; Marian Seldes; John Harding; George Hamilton
- Cinematography: Floyd Crosby
- Edited by: Merrill G. White
- Music by: Herschel Burke Gilbert
- Production company: Sanders Associates Production
- Distributed by: Allied Artists
- Release date: May 1, 1959; (world premiere)
- Running time: 96 minutes
- Country: United States
- Language: English
- Budget: $100,000

Crime and Punishment U.S.A. is a 1959 American crime drama film directed by Denis Sanders, written by Walter Newman and starring George Hamilton in his first screen role. The film was released on November 1, 1959.

The New York Times called the film "a beat generation version" of the novel Crime and Punishment by Fyodor Dostoyevsky. The film differs from the book in some of its plot elements and characterizations, and it takes place in contemporary Santa Monica rather than in 19th-century Russia.

Hamilton's performance led to MGM casting him in Home from the Hill (1959). Filmink noted " It really is kind of amazing that someone who became famous for his suntan and lifestyle made his debut in such an arty production."

== Plot summary ==
In Santa Monica, California, an elderly pawn shop owner called Lizzie Griggs is found beaten to death inside her shop. There is a crowd of onlookers outside, including law student Robert Cole, who collapses on the street. Cole is taken home by his best friend and school mate, Rafe. Cole then goes to the beach and buries a sack holding a crowbar, gloves, and a pot full of money. Cole finds an old man who has collapsed and takes him home to his daughter, Sally.

Cole is told by his mother that his sister, Debbie, is marrying a much older man, Peter Lewis, in order to help their impoverished family. Cole arranges a meeting with Lt Porter, who is investigating the death of Lizzie Griggs, to retrieve items he pawned with Griggs. Porter recognises Cole as the author of an article outlining a philosophy that claims certain individuals are above the law if they are superior to others and their actions ultimately benefit mankind.

Cole meets a man Fred Swanson, Debbie’s former employer, who reveals his wife died recently and left Debbie money in her will because she feels bad that Swanson was sleazy with Debbie. Cole is approached by Sally, who thanks him for looking after her father. She reveals she is a prostitute because her family was poor.

When Cole goes to retrieve his items from the police, Lt Porter interrogates him. However, then a report comes through that a young artist has confessed to the Griggs murder. Cole confesses to Sally he murdered Griggs because he needed the money and because he considered Griggs' life was worthless. Swanson reveals he overheard this conversation.

Lt Porter tells Cole that despite the artist's confession, he believes that Cole is the murderer. Porter urges Bob to give himself up. Swanson confesses to Cole that he murdered his wife. Swanson asks Debbie to leave with him but she refuses, so Swanson commits suicide. Cole confesses to Lt Porter that he murdered Griggs.

== Cast ==
- George Hamilton as Robert Cole
- Mary Murphy as Sally Marmon
- Frank Silvera as Lt. Porter
- Marian Seldes as Debbie Cole
- John Harding as Fred Swanson
- Wayne Heffley as Rafe
- Toni Merrill as Mrs. Cole
- Lew Brown as Sgt. Samuels
- Barry Atwater
- Sid Clute as Doctor
- Ken Drake as Hendricks
- Magda Harout
- Jim Hyland as Man in Coffee Shop
- Len Lesser as Desk Officer
- George Saris

== Production ==
It was the first feature from the Sanders brothers, who had received attention with an Oscar-winning short, A Time Out of War and had been signed to write the script version of The Naked and the Dead. The film was one of at least seven deals Allied Artists' president Steve Broidy signed with independent producers around this time. Allied Artists provided 60% of the budget with the rest coming from private sources. One of the investors was Roger Corman who had money in a number of low budget films made by other filmmakers around this time such as Stakeout on Dope Street.

According to George Hamilton, director Denis Sanders "saw his project as a tragedy for the Beat Generation" and cast Hamilton in the lead because of his similarity to Tony Perkins. As part of his deal to make the film, Hamilton signed a five year contract with Denis and Terry Sanders' TD Productions; in 1961 he bought himself out of this contract.

Filming started 16 June 1958 but the film was not released until May 1959.

== Reception ==
=== Critical ===
Variety said "while it does not succeed completely is an exciting and interesting film... Hamilton, a good looking young man, makes one of the most impressive film bows of any juvenile in several years."

In a contemporary review for The New Republic, Stanley Kauffmann commented that "modern versions of classics are generally more clever than convincing because the very term 'classic' means a timeless work ... that need not be transplanted. ... [B]y reason of its attendant skills and an innocent, unpretentious earnestness of address, [the film] is a moderately interesting attempt to state the material of a vast symphony with a small jazz combination."

Filmink called it "one of those films you describe as “interesting” rather than good, but it’s always watchable; Hamilton’s performance is indeed a little Tony Perkins-esque; to be honest, it’s all over the shop, sometimes effective, other times less so."

=== Box office ===
Roger Corman later said that the film "lost me a lot of money."

== See also ==
- List of American films of 1959
