= Robert Fresco =

Robert Fresco may refer to:

- Robert M. Fresco (1930–2014), American screenwriter and film producer
- Robert Fresco (cinematographer) (born 1943), Canadian cinematographer and documentary filmmaker
