= Czechoslovakia 1968 =

1969 film by Denis Sanders

- Directed by: Denis Sanders and Robert M. Fresco
- Produced by: Denis Sanders and Robert M. Fresco
- Edited by: Marvin Wallowitz
- Music by: Charles Bernstein
- Production company: Sanders/Fresco Film Makers for U.S. Information Agency
- Distributed by: Ocean Releasing
- Release date: 1969
- Running time: 14:36
- Country: United States
- Language: English

Czechoslovakia 1968 (also known as Czechoslovakia 1918-1968) is a 1969 short documentary film about the "Prague Spring", the Warsaw Pact invasion of Czechoslovakia. The film was produced by the United States Information Agency (USIA) under the direction of Robert M. Fresco and Denis Sanders and features the graphic design of Norman Gollin.

It won the Academy Award for Best Documentary Short Subject and in 1997, was selected for preservation in the United States National Film Registry by the Library of Congress having been identified as "culturally, historically, or aesthetically significant".

== Controversy ==
In 1972, Senator James L. Buckley obtained a copy of Czechoslovakia 1968 to show on New York television stations. The chairman of the Senate Foreign Relations Committee, J. William Fulbright, objected to the broadcast based on an interpretation of the Smith–Mundt Act, which would prohibit the domestic dissemination of material produced by the USIA. Fulbright complained to the Attorney General, but the Justice Department refused to intervene based on the interpretation of existing US law. In 1972, Congress amended the Smith-Mundt Act, based on this event, to explicitly prohibit the domestic dissemination of materials produced by the USIA. The USIA was abolished in 1999.

== Accolades ==
- 1970 - Academy Award for Best Documentary Short Subject

== See also ==
- List of American films of 1969
- Cinema of Czechoslovakia
