= A Time Out of War =

1954 film

- Directed by: Denis Sanders
- Based on: Pickets by Robert W. Chambers
- Produced by: Denis Sanders; Terry Sanders
- Starring: Corey Allen; Barry Atwater
- Production company: Carnival Productions
- Distributed by: Universal-International
- Release date: 1954
- Running time: 20 minutes
- Country: United States
- Language: English

A Time Out of War is a 1954 American short war film directed by Denis Sanders and starring Corey Allen and Barry Atwater. In 1955, it won an Academy Award for Best Short Subject (Two-Reel) at the 27th Academy Awards, first prize at the Venice Film Festival Live Action Short Film category, and a BAFTA Special Award, among others.

== Summary ==
The film depicts a one-hour truce agreed to by Union and Confederate soldiers who are on opposite sides of a river.

== Production ==
Denis Sanders was in UCLA film school whilst his brother was a UCLA undergraduate. For Denis's thesis, he searched for an American Civil War short story that was in the public domain to adapt into a film. He chose Pickets, an 1897 story by Robert W. Chambers. Folksinger and songwriter Frank Hamilton composed the original music for the film.

== Reception and legacy ==
Critic Bosley Crowther called it "a keen and eloquent little picture".

The prestige of the film led Terry to be hired by Charles Laughton as the second unit director of The Night of the Hunter (1955). Both brothers were then hired to write the screenplay for The Naked and the Dead, which led to film careers for both men.

In 2006, the film was selected for preservation in the National Film Registry by Library of Congress.

The Academy Film Archive also preserved A Time Out of War in 2007

== Cast ==
- Corey Allen as Connor
- Barry Atwater as Craig
