= Tarantula (film) =

1955 US science-fiction monster film by Jack Arnold

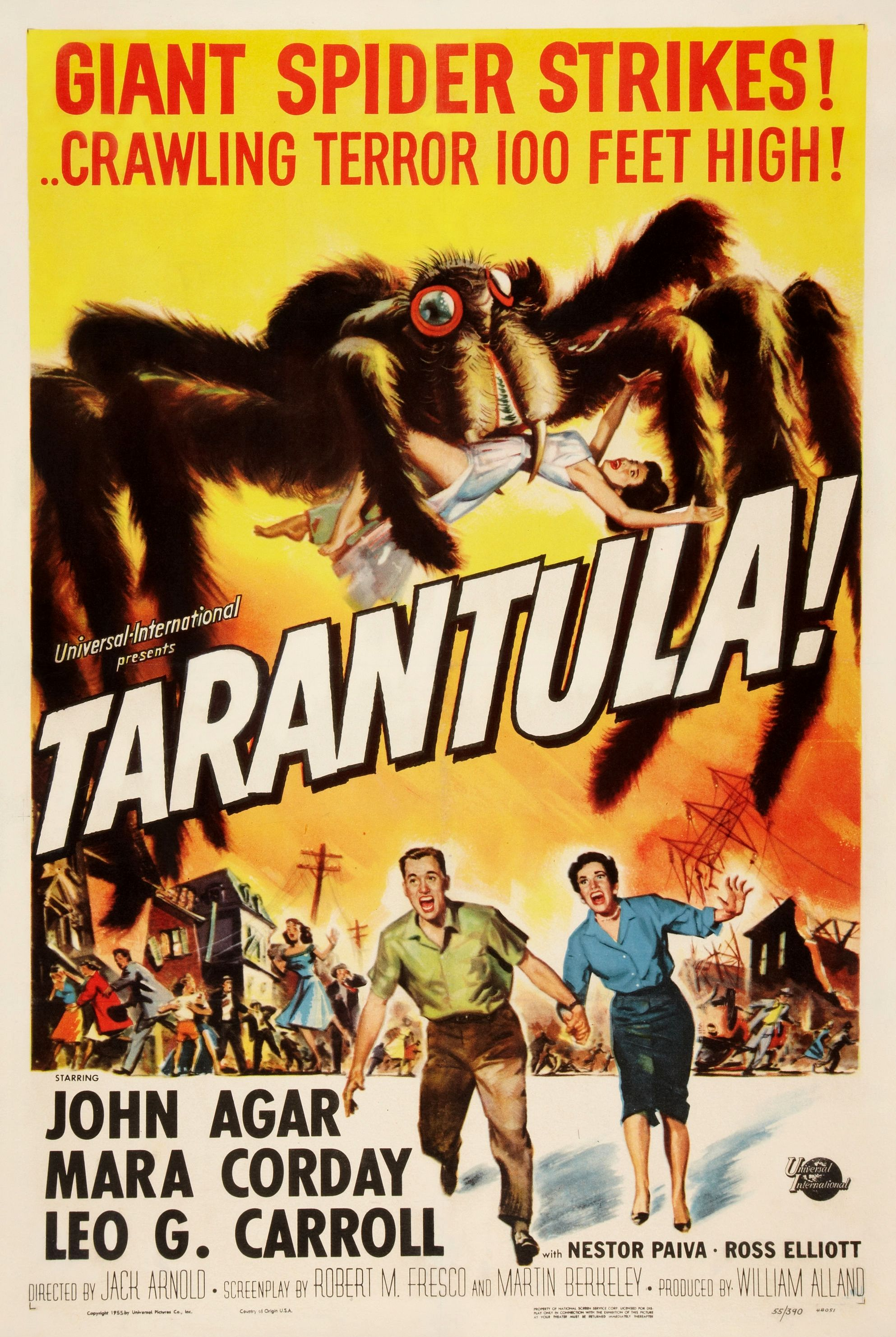
- Theatrical release poster by Reynold Brown
- Directed by: Jack Arnold
- Screenplay by: Robert M. Fresco; Martin Berkeley
- Story by: Jack Arnold; Robert M. Fresco
- Based on: "No Food for Thought" (teleplay, Science Fiction Theatre, May 17, 1955) by Robert M. Fresco
- Produced by: William Alland
- Starring: John Agar; Mara Corday; Leo G. Carroll; Nestor Paiva
- Cinematography: George Robinson
- Edited by: William Morgan
- Music by: Henry Mancini; Herman Stein
- Color process: Black and white
- Production company: Universal Pictures
- Distributed by: Universal-International
- Release date: October 29, 1955
- Running time: 80 minutes
- Country: United States
- Language: English
- Box office: $1.1 million (US and Canadian rentals)

Tarantula is a 1955 American science-fiction monster film produced by William Alland and directed by Jack Arnold. It stars John Agar, Mara Corday, and Leo G. Carroll. The film is about a scientist developing a miracle nutrient to feed a rapidly growing human population. In its unperfected state, the nutrient causes extraordinarily rapid growth, creating a deadly problem when a tarantula test subject escapes and continues to grow larger and larger. The screenplay by Robert M. Fresco and Martin Berkeley was based on a story by Arnold, which was in turn inspired by Fresco's teleplay for the 1955 Science Fiction Theatre episode "No Food for Thought", also directed by Arnold. The film was distributed by Universal Pictures as a Universal-International release, and reissued in 1962 through Sherman S. Krellberg's Ultra Pictures.

== Plot ==
A severely deformed man is found dead in the Arizona desert. Dr. Matt Hastings, a physician from the nearby town of Desert Rock, Arizona, is called in by the sheriff to examine the body, which appears to be that of biological research scientist Eric Jacobs, an acquaintance of Hastings'. Jacobs' colleague, Dr. Gerald Deemer, says Jacobs died of acromegaly, but Hastings is unconvinced, since acromegaly takes years to reach the level where Jacobs was. Deemer acknowledges that Jacobs's development of acromegaly was rapid, over just four days, but insists that such anomalies are to be expected on occasion.

In his home and research laboratory in an isolated desert mansion, Deemer keeps rabbits, white rats, hamsters, and a tarantula, all of enormous size, some as large as Golden Retrievers. Deemer's assistant, doctoral student Paul Lund, is now deformed like Jacobs, and attacks Deemer, smashing the glass covering a tarantula's cage and setting the lab aflame in his rampage. Lund grabs the hypodermic needle that Deemer was using on the lab specimens and injects him with the contents. As flames engulf the lab, the tarantula leaves and Lund collapses and dies. Deemer regains consciousness, grabs a fire extinguisher, and puts out the fire. That night, Deemer buries Lund in the desert.

A newcomer to town, Stephanie Clayton, nicknamed "Steve", has signed on to assist in Deemer's lab. Told by the hotel clerk that she will have to wait until the only taxi returns, she accepts a ride from Hastings, who is also going to Deemer's lab. At the mansion, they encounter local journalist Joe Burch, who is asking questions about Jacobs's death, but getting the runaround from Deemer. Deemer tells Hastings and Clayton that the fire was caused by an equipment malfunction, all the test animals were killed, and Lund has left his employment. Deemer explains his work - the use of a radioactive element to produce an artificial supernutrient, which once perfected, could provide an unlimited food supply for humanity.

Days later, the sheriff asks Hastings to accompany him to Andy Anderson's ranch as he investigates picked-clean cattle skeletons and large pools of a thick, white liquid. The tarantula, now grown to the size of a tank, is the cause. That night, Anderson and two men inside a pickup truck are killed by the tarantula.

The next day, at the scene of the wrecked truck, Hastings looks around at the request of the sheriff, and once again finds pools of the white liquid, of which he takes samples. He calls Deemer to ask him to analyze the liquid, and Clayton answers. Deemer ambushes her, and the phone call is cut. Hastings drives back to the mansion, where he finds Deemer near death, suffering from severe acromegalic deformities. Deemer divulges all that he knows about the nutrient and says that Lund and Jacobs tested it on themselves against his advice. Hastings flies the samples of white liquid to the Arizona Agricultural Institute in Phoenix. The substance is determined to be tarantula venom.

Hastings flies back to Desert Rock. As night falls, the tarantula, now larger than a house, attacks the mansion. Deemer is killed, but Clayton escapes. Hastings returns for her in his car. The tarantula pursues them down the highway toward the town. The sheriff's men intercept, but their guns have no effect. Dynamite is gathered from town, but a blast large enough to blow up the highway does not faze the tarantula. As they evacuate the town, an Air Force fighter jet squadron, summoned by the sheriff, launches a napalm attack, incinerating the tarantula at the town's edge.

== Cast ==
- John Agar as Dr. Matt Hastings
- Mara Corday as Stephanie Clayton
- Leo G. Carroll as Prof. Gerald Deemer
- Nestor Paiva as Sheriff Jack Andrews
- Eddie Parker as Jacobs, Lund, and the Airport Workman
- Ross Elliott as Joe Burch
- Hank Patterson as Josh
- Edwin Rand as Lt. John Nolan
- Raymond Bailey as Dr. Townsend
- Bert Holland as Barney Russell
- Steve Darrell as Andy Andersen

Clint Eastwood appears uncredited in a minor role as the jet squadron leader.

== Production ==
Tarantula takes place in the fictional town of Desert Rock, Arizona.

The film's special effects, which depict giant animals and insects, were advanced for the mid-1950s. Real animals, including a rabbit and a guinea pig in Professor Deemer's lab, were used to represent their giant on-screen counterparts. A live tarantula was used whenever the gigantic spider is seen moving. Shooting of miniatures was reserved for close-ups of its face and fangs and for the final scenes of the giant spider being set ablaze by the jet squadron's napalm attack. The resulting scenes proved more convincing in some ways, than the giant prop ants used in the earlier Warner Bros. film Them! (1954). Of this and the entire film, Jack Arnold said about Tarantula: "We decided to do this film because, generally, people are very afraid of spiders".

Although set in Arizona, Tarantula was filmed entirely in California, with the desert scenes being shot in Apple Valley. Additional footage was shot in and around the rock formations of Dead Man's Point in Lucerne Valley, California, a frequently used location for many early Western films.

Like Them!, Tarantula makes atmospheric use of its desert locations. While a radioactive isotope does make an appearance, it differs from most other 1950s big-bug features in having the mutation caused by the peaceful research of a well-intentioned scientist, rather than by nuclear weapons and/or a mad genius. Director Jack Arnold used matte effects once again two years later to show miniaturization, rather than gigantism, in The Incredible Shrinking Man (1957), which also featured an encounter with a spider.

The film's theatrical release poster, featuring a spider with two eyes instead of the normal eight, and carrying a woman in its fangs, does not represent any scene in the final film.

== Reception ==
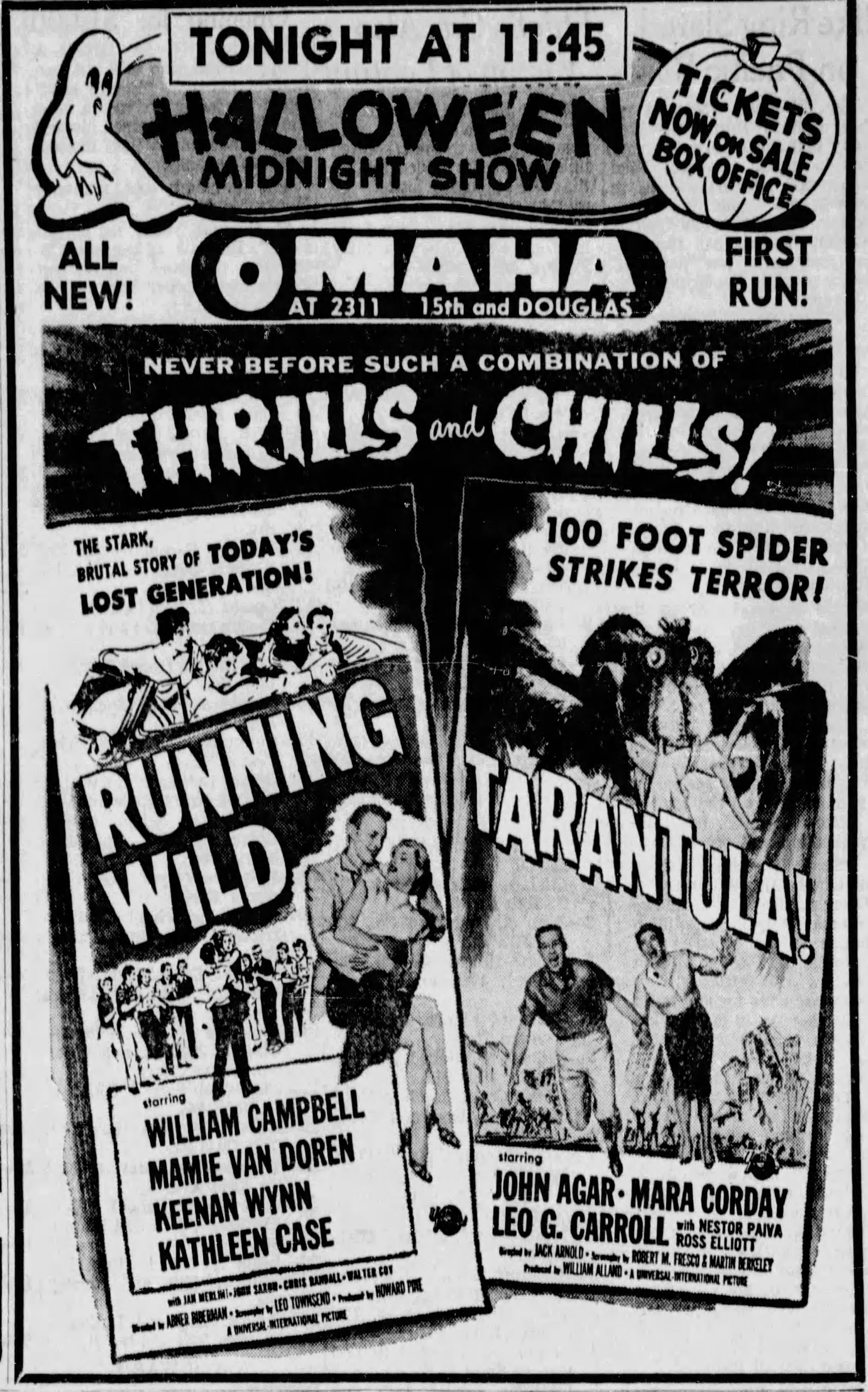
Advertisement from 1955 for Tarantula and co-feature, Running Wild

The film was often paired with Running Wild as part of a double feature. It was the fourth-biggest film at the U.S. box office in December 1955 and earned rentals of $1.1 million.

Film critic Leonard Maltin awarded the film 3 out of 4 stars, praising the film's fast pacing, special effects, and intriguing subplot. He called it, "One of the best giant-insect films". The contemporary review in Variety indicated "A tarantula as big as a barn puts the horror into this well-made program science-fictioner, and it is quite credibly staged and played, bringing off the far-fetched premise with a maximum of believability". In Video Movie Guide 2002, authors Mick Martin and Marsh Potter characterized Tarantula as "(a) pretty good entry in the giant bug subgenre of 1950s horror and science fiction movies". On Rotten Tomatoes it has an approval rating of 92% based on 13 reviews, with an average score of 6.3/10.

== Home media ==
The film was first released on DVD by Universal Studios on April 3, 2006. Universal later re-released the film as a part of its boxed set The Classic Sci-Fi Collection, along with four other classics: The Incredible Shrinking Man, Monster on the Campus, The Monolith Monsters, and The Mole People. It was last released on September 27, 2013. The German region B Blu-ray from Koch Media features both a 1.33:1 (Academy ratio) and a 1.78:1 widescreen version of the film. Shout! Factory released a region A Blu-ray April 30, 2019. It features audio commentary by Tom Weaver, Dr. Robert J. Kiss, and David Schecter.

== In popular culture ==
Tarantula and lead actor Leo G. Carroll are referenced in the lyrics of "Science Fiction/Double Feature", the opening song of the musical stage production The Rocky Horror Show and its 1975 film adaptation.

== See also ==
- List of natural horror films § Arachnids
- Monster movie
- List of American films of 1955
- Earth vs. the Spider
