= Denis Sanders =

American film director (1929–1987)

- Born: January 21, 1929; New York City
- Died: December 10, 1987 (aged 58); San Diego, California
- Occupations: Film director Screenwriter; Film producer
- Years active: 1954–1987
- Relatives: Terry Sanders (brother); Freida Lee Mock (sister-in-law); Peter Sanders (son)

Denis Sanders (January 21, 1929 – December 10, 1987) was an American film director, screenwriter and producer. He was the brother of Terry Sanders.

== Biography ==
He was born in New York City, the son of sculptor and designer Altina Schinasi. He died from a heart attack in San Diego, California, where he was professor and film maker in residence at San Diego State University. His daughter, Victoria Sanders, is a literary agent and film producer.

== Career ==
He acted as a dialogue director of Night of the Hunter, where his brother filmed the night scenes.

In 1959, he was going to direct The Subterraneans.

He directed the debut performances of Robert Redford and Tom Skerritt in the 1962 film War Hunt. He won two Academy Awards, the first for Best Short Subject in 1955 for A Time Out of War that had served as his master's degree thesis at UCLA and which he co-scripted with his brother Terry Sanders; and the second for Best Documentary in 1970 for Czechoslovakia 1968. In 1958, he teamed up again with Terry Sanders to adapt Norman Mailer's World War II novel The Naked and the Dead.

== Selected filmography ==
- A Time Out of War (1954) (with Terry Sanders)
- The Naked and the Dead (1958, screen adaptation, with Terry Sanders)
- Crime and Punishment U.S.A. (1959)
- War Hunt (1962)
- One Man's Way (1963)
- Shock Treatment (1964)
- Czechoslovakia 1968 (1969) (with Robert M. Fresco)
- Elvis: That's the Way It Is (1970)
- The American West of John Ford (1971) TV documentary
- Trial – The City and County of Denver vs. Lauren S. Watson (1971)
- Soul to Soul (1971)
- Invasion of the Bee Girls (1973)
