= Merrick Butte =

Butte in Navajo County, Arizona

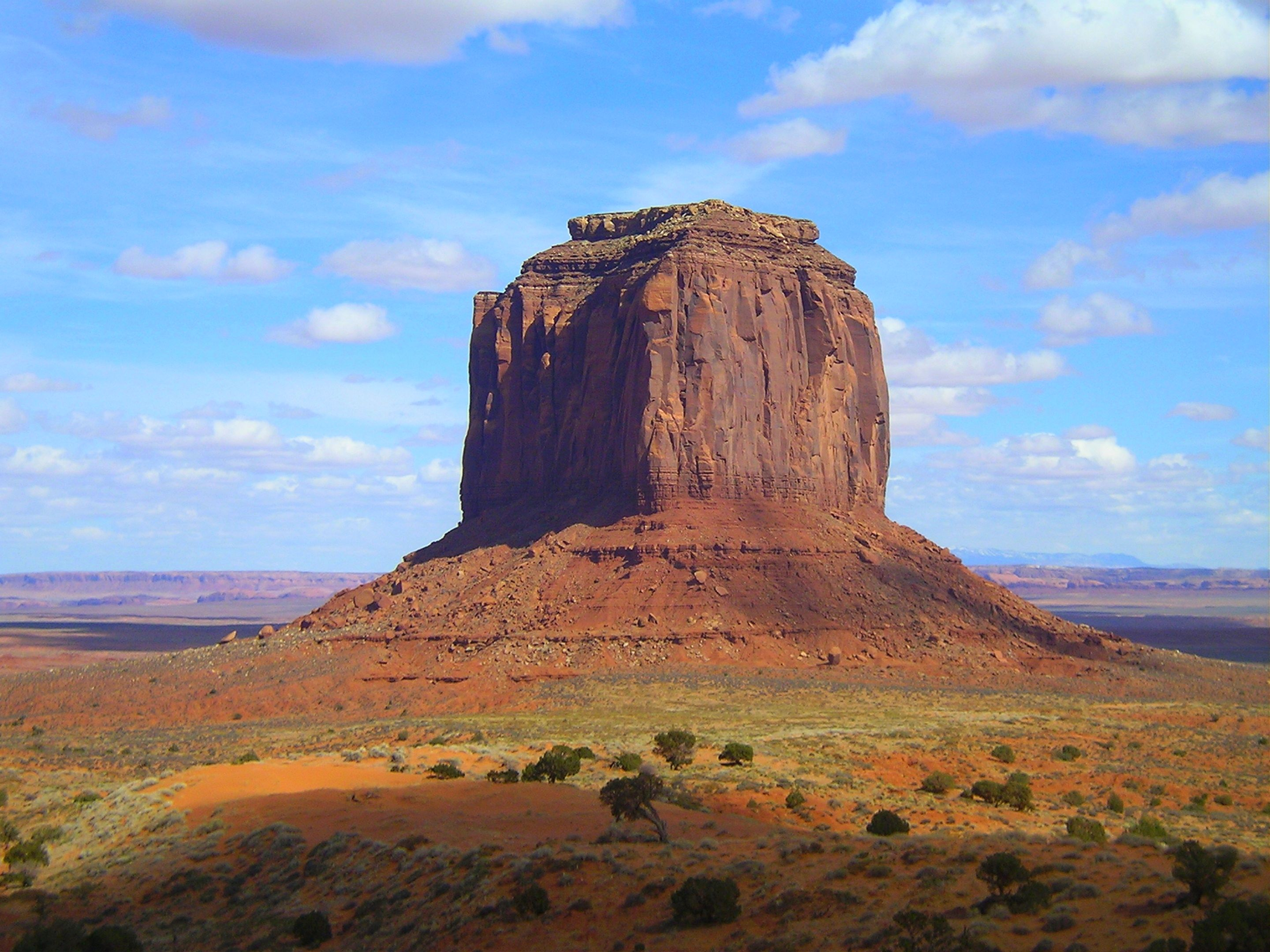

Highest point
- Elevation: 6,206 ft (1,892 m) NAVD 88
- Prominence: 966 ft (294 m)
- Coordinates: 36°58′50″N 110°05′09″W

Geography
- Location within Arizona Location within the United States
- Location: Navajo County, Arizona. U.S.
- Topo map: USGS Mitten Buttes

Merrick Butte is a butte located in Monument Valley and is part of the Monument Valley Navajo Tribal Park, similar to its neighbors West and East Mitten Buttes just to the north. It was named after silver miner Jack Merrick, killed by Native Americans in 1880.
