= Butte =

Isolated hill with steep, often vertical sides and a small, relatively flat top

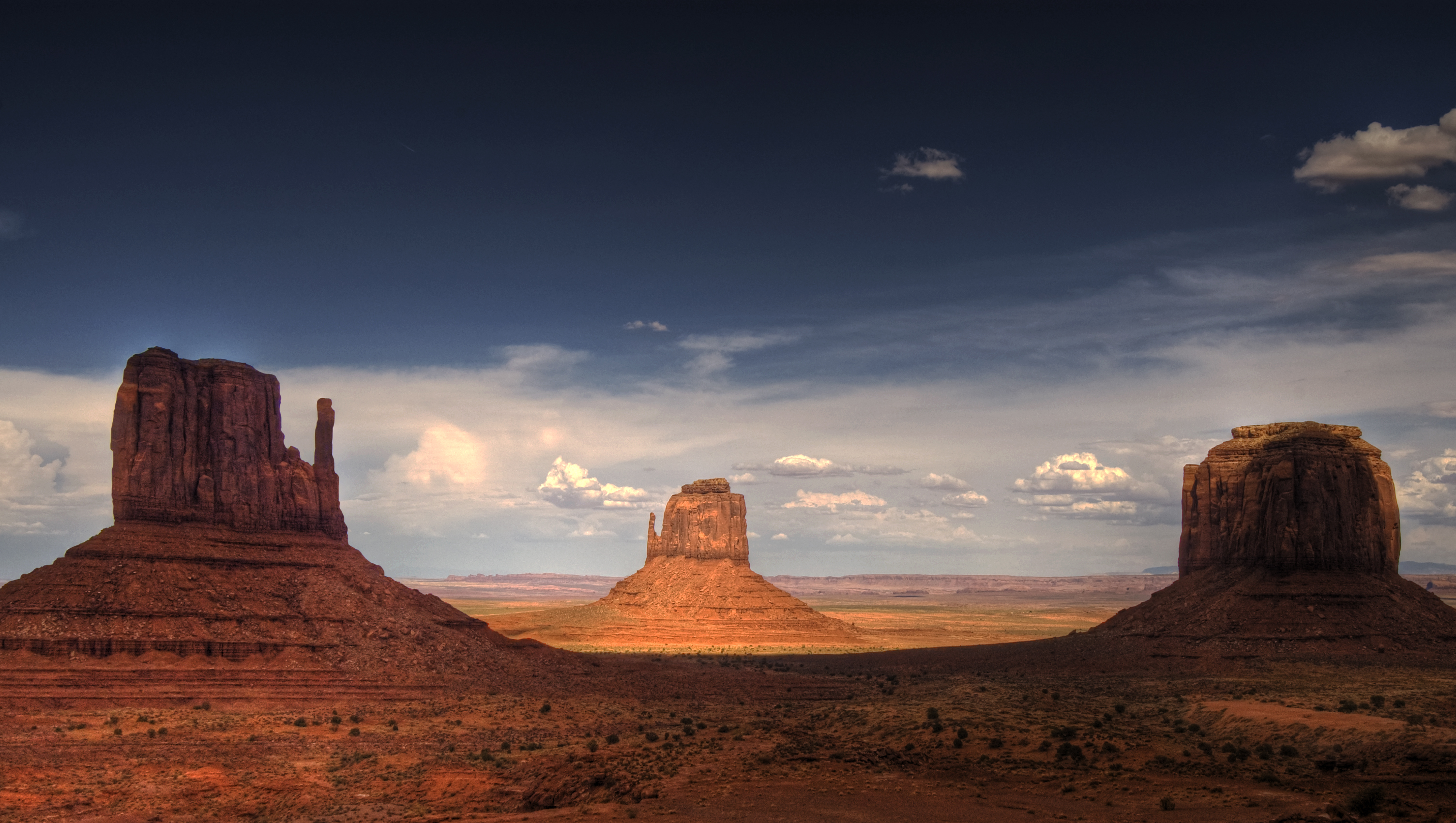
The Mittens and Merrick Butte in Monument Valley, Utah–Arizona

In geomorphology, a butte (/bjuːt/ BEWT) is an isolated hill with steep, often vertical sides and a small, relatively flat top; buttes are smaller landforms than mesas, plateaus, and tablelands. The word butte comes from the French word butte (French: [byt]), meaning 'knoll' (of any size); its use is prevalent in the Western United States, including the Southwest, where mesa (Spanish for 'table') is used for the larger landform.

To differentiate the two landforms, geographers use the rule of thumb that a mesa has a top that is wider than its height, while a butte has a top that is narrower than its height. Due to their distinctive shapes, buttes are frequently landmarks in plains and mountainous areas.

== Formation ==
Diagram of the formation of a butte from a previously existing mesa

Buttes form by weathering and erosion when hard caprock overlies a layer of less resistant rock that is eventually worn away. The harder rock on top of the butte resists erosion. The caprock provides protection for the less resistant rock below from wind abrasion, which leaves it standing isolated. As the top is further eroded by abrasion and weathering, the excess material that falls off adds to the scree or talus slope around the base. On a much smaller scale, the same process forms hoodoos.

Buttes are not permanent features. The same manner that forms a butte in the first place also contributes to its end. As a butte continues to undergo weather, it will eventually weather into a spire, finally collapsing at the end. Because of this, all famous buttes existing today will eventually be worn down and collapse. This is a slow process, however, with total collapse only finally occurring after millions of years.

== Notable buttes ==
The Mitten Buttes of Monument Valley in the Utah–Arizona state line are two of the most distinctive and widely recognized buttes. Monument Valley and the Mittens provided backgrounds in the scenes of many western-themed films, including seven movies directed by John Ford. (Note: The John Ford westerns with location work shot in Monument Valley were Stagecoach (1939), My Darling Clementine (1946), Fort Apache (1948), She Wore a Yellow Ribbon (1949), The Searchers (1956), Sergeant Rutledge (1960), and Cheyenne Autumn (1964).) Another very well-known and frequently photographed butte in northern Arizona is Thumb Butte, which overlooks the city of Prescott and is the most prominent and distinctive geologic landmark in the vicinity. The Devils Tower in northeastern Wyoming is a laccolithic butte composed of igneous rock rather than sandstone, limestone or other sedimentary rocks.

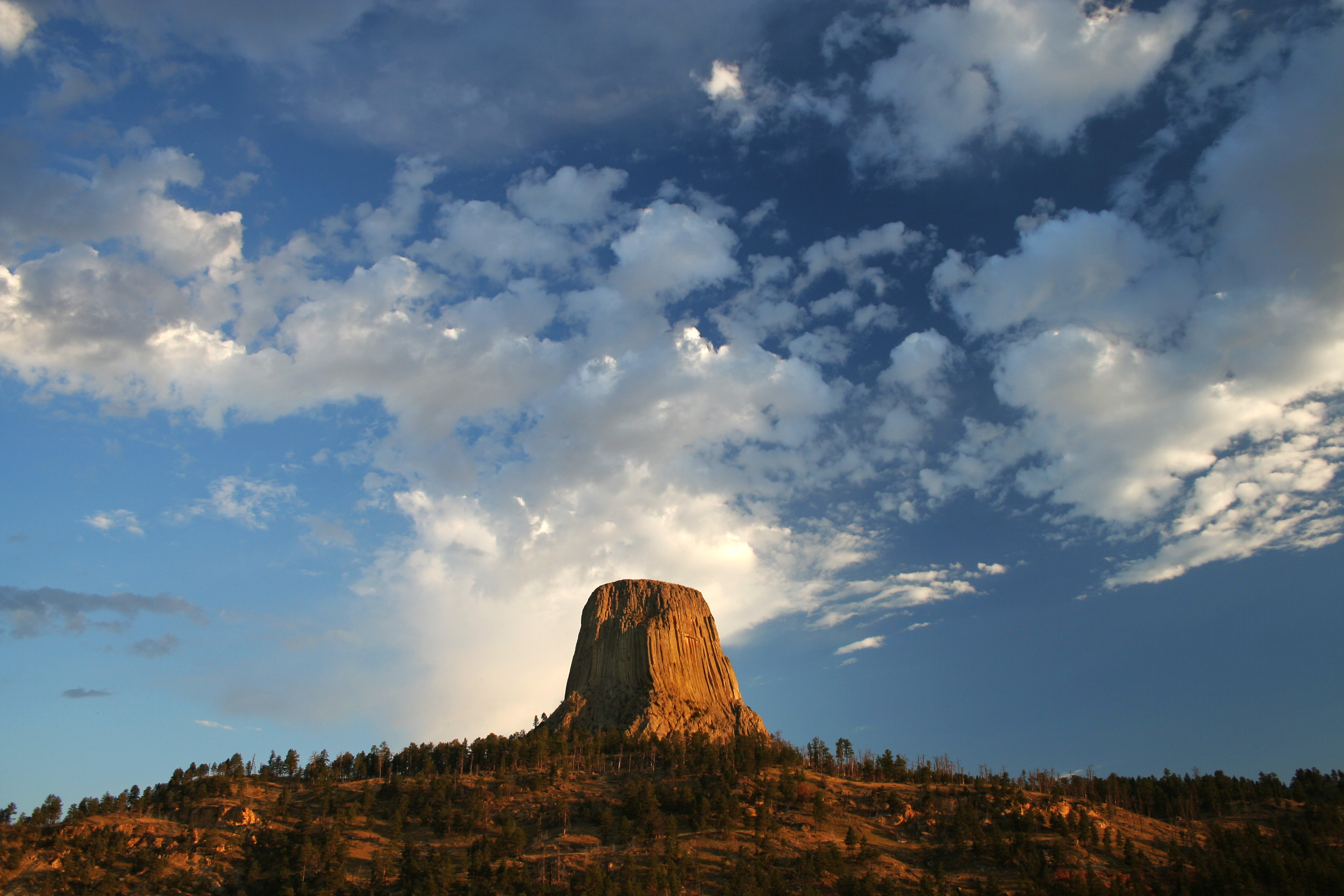
Devils Tower in Wyoming

The term butte is sometimes applied more broadly to isolated, steep-sided hills with pointed or craggy, rather than flat, tops. Three notable formations that are either named butte or may be considered buttes even though they do not conform to the formal geographer's rule are Scotts Bluff in Nebraska which is a collection of five bluffs, Crested Butte, which is a 12,168 ft (3,709 m) mountain in Colorado, and Elephant Butte, which is now an island in Elephant Butte Reservoir in New Mexico.

Among the well-known non-flat-topped buttes in the United States are Bear Butte, South Dakota, Black Butte, Oregon, and the Sutter Buttes in California. In many cases, buttes have been given other names that do not use the word butte, for example, Courthouse Rock, Nebraska. Also, some large hills that are technically not buttes have names that use the word, including Kamiak Butte, Chelan Butte, and Steptoe Butte in Washington state.

== Gallery ==
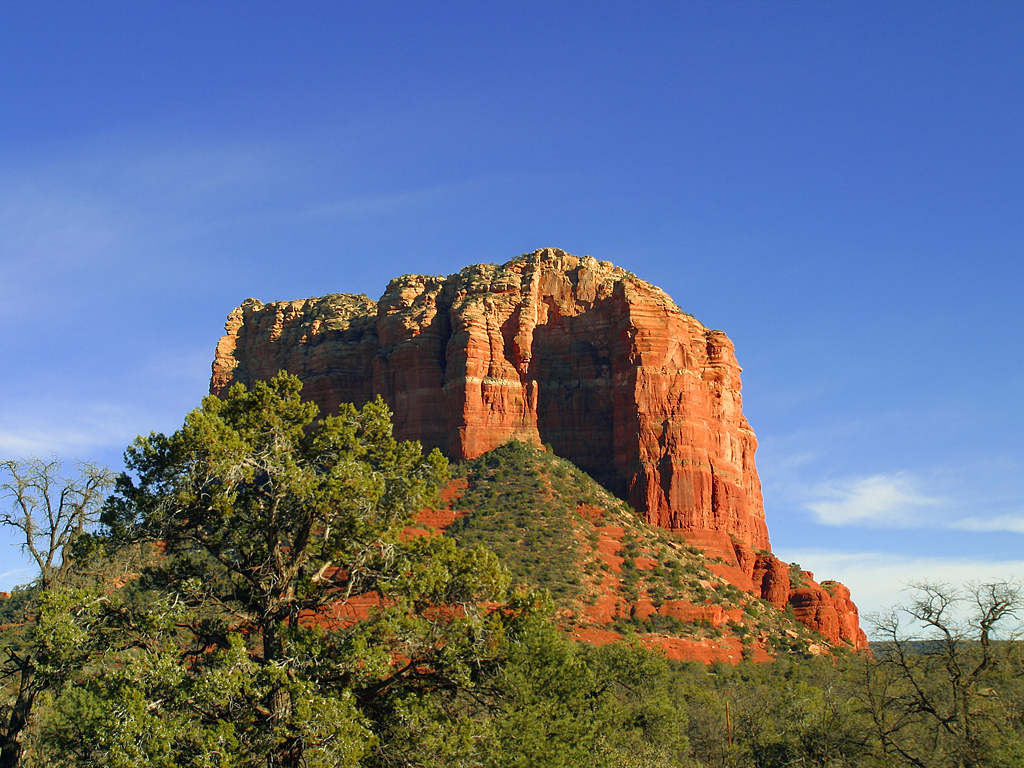
Courthouse Butte near Sedona, Arizona

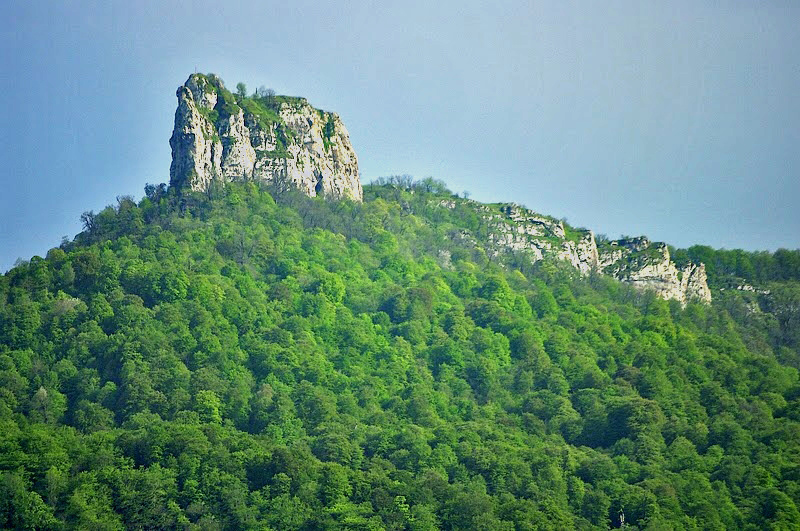
Qaxaç Qalası or Kachaghakaberd fortress, Khojali District, Azerbaijan

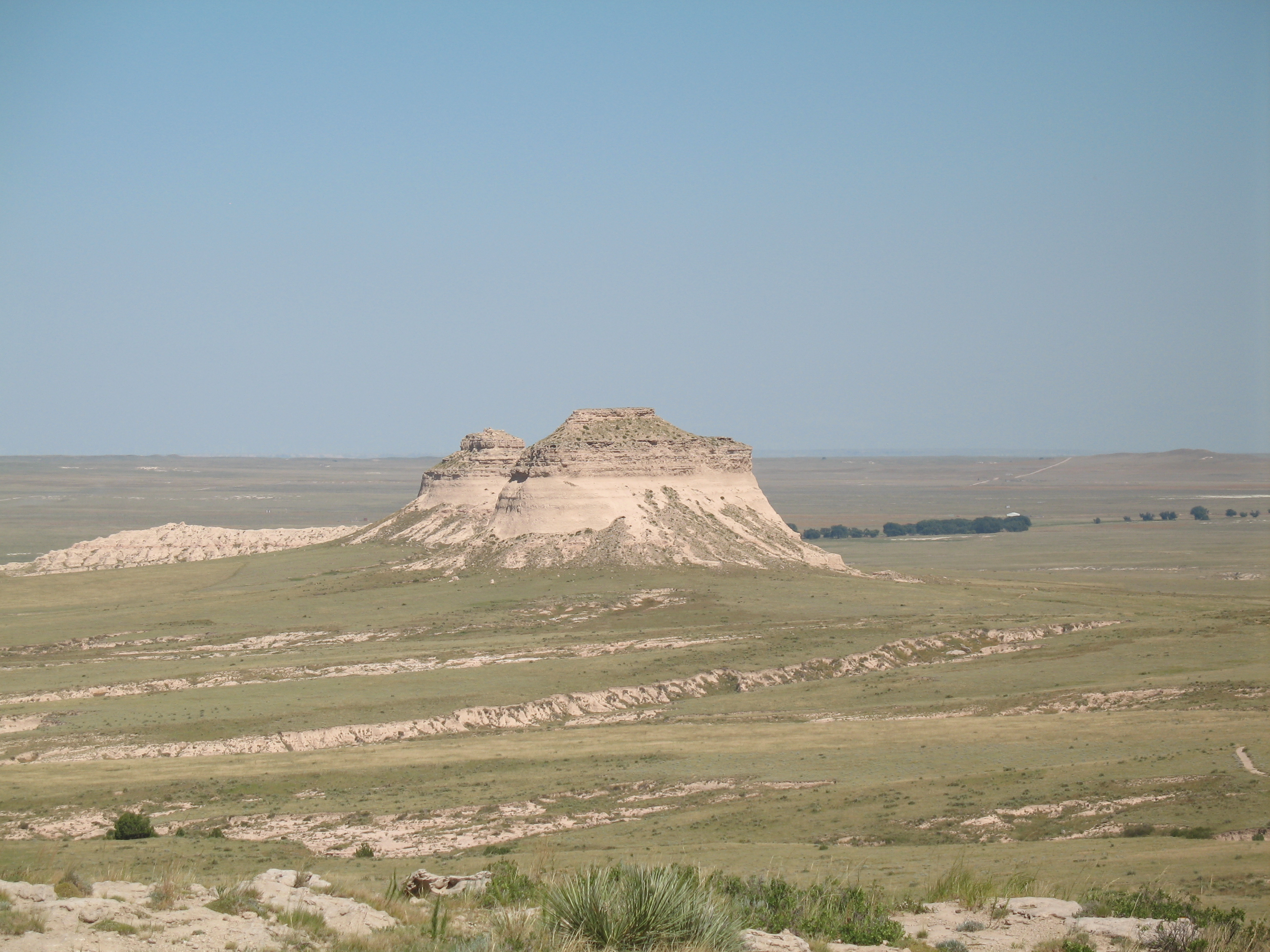
Pawnee Buttes, Pawnee National Grassland, Colorado

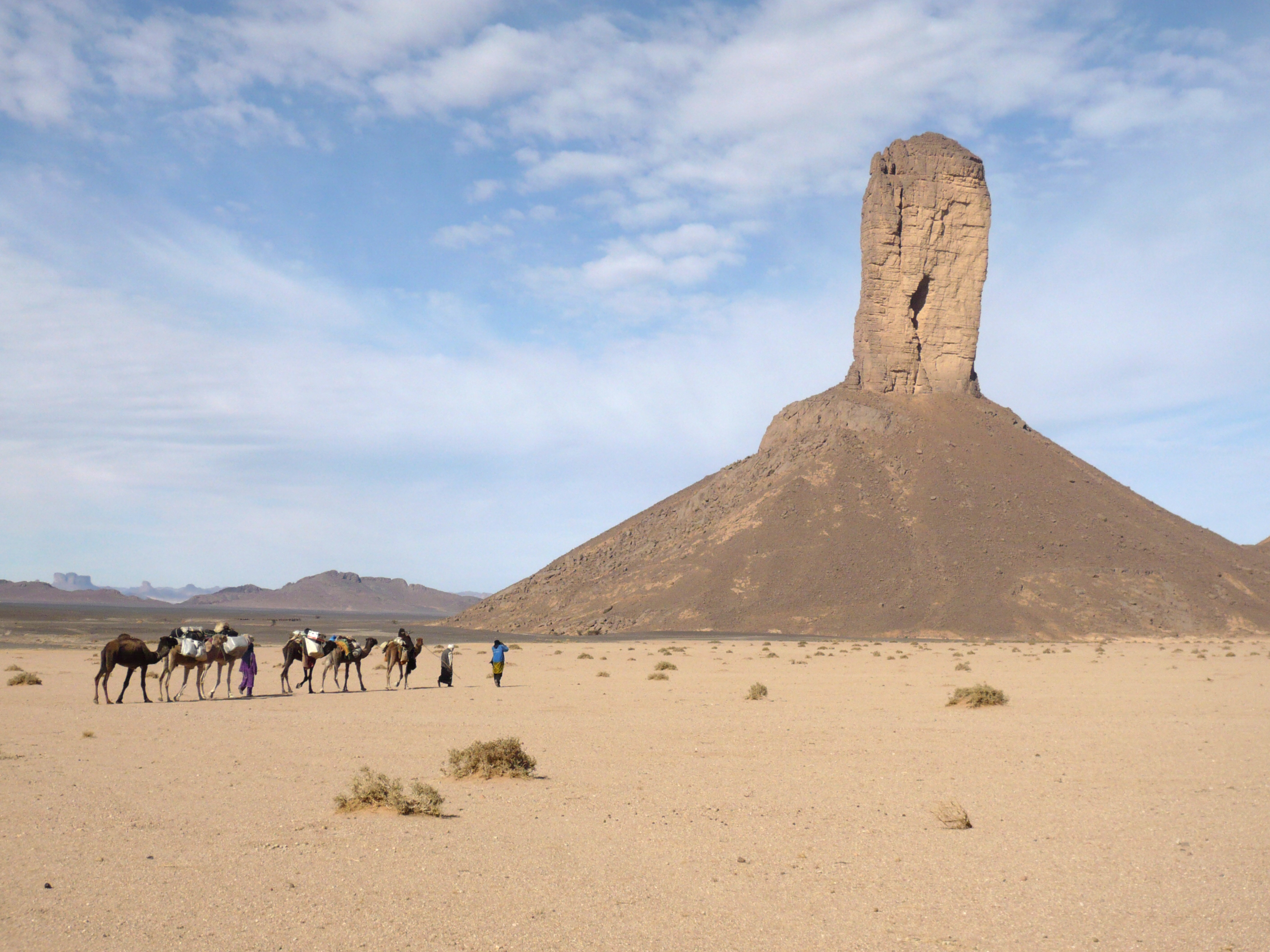
Tamanrasset Province, Algeria

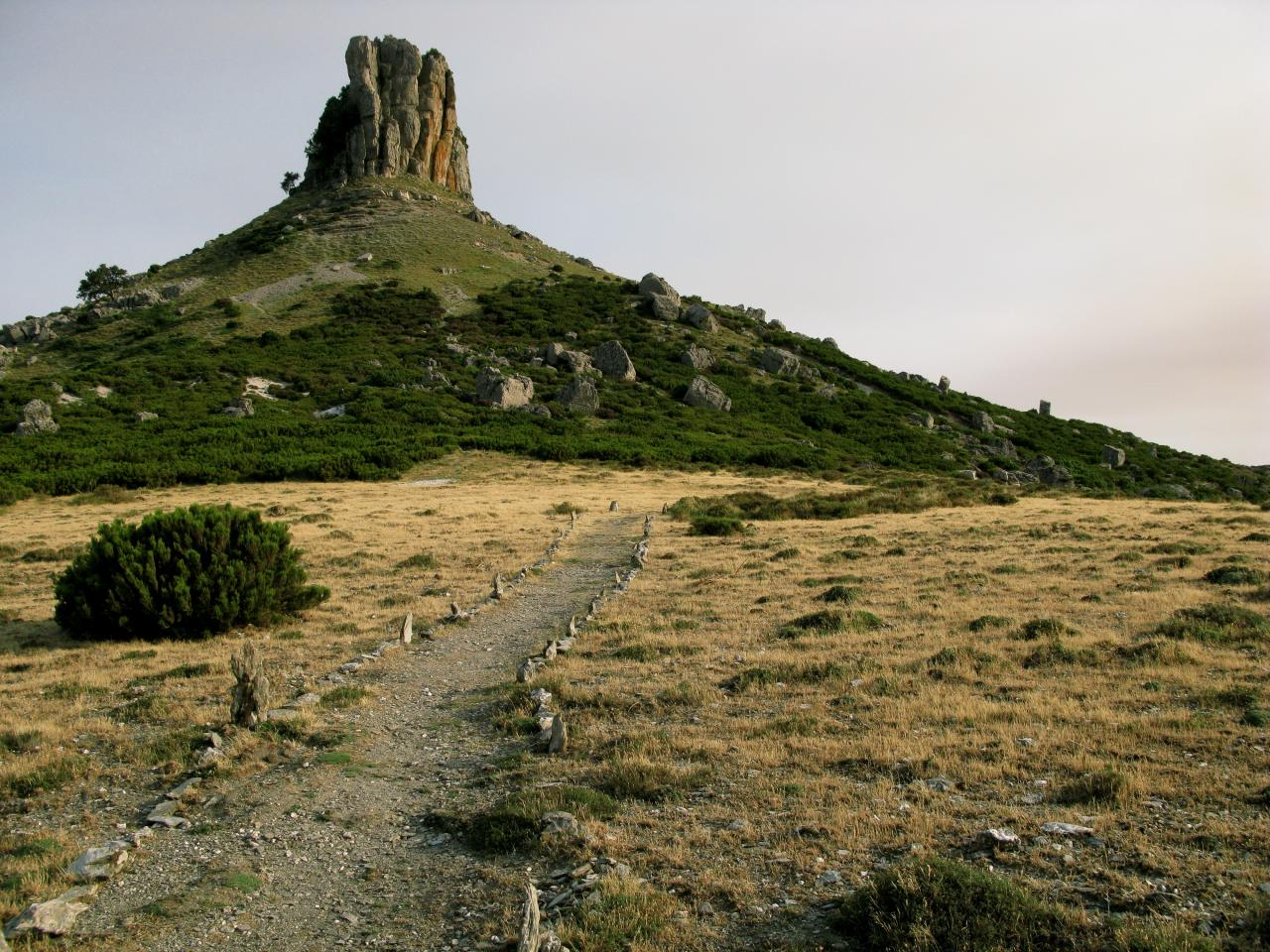
Monte Perda Liana in Sardinia, Italy.

== See also ==
- Caprock Escarpment – Geographical transition in Texas and New Mexico
- Inliers and outliers (geology) – Area of older rock surrounded by younger rock
- Megalith – Large stone used to build a structure or monument
- Monadnock – Isolated, steep rock hill on relatively flat terrain
- Monolith – Stone block made of one single piece; object made of one single rock piece
- Potrero – Long mesa that at one end slopes upward to higher terrain
- Table mountain (disambiguation)
- Tepui – Table-top mountain or mesa in the Guiana Highlands of South America
- Tuya – Flat-topped, steep-sided volcano
- Volcanic plug – Volcanic object created when magma hardens within a vent on an active volcano
