= Robert M. Fresco =

American film producer (1930–2014)

Robert Maurice Fresco
- Born: October 18, 1930; Culver City, California, United States
- Died: February 14, 2014 (aged 83); Manhattan, New York, United States
- Occupations: Film producer Screenwriter
- Years active: 1954-1972

Robert Maurice Fresco (October 18, 1930 – February 14, 2014) was an American film producer and screenwriter. Along with Denis Sanders, he won the Academy Award for Documentary Short Subject for Czechoslovakia 1968.

== Selected filmography ==
- Tarantula (1955)
- The Monolith Monsters (1957)
- The Alligator People (1959)
- Space Invasion of Lapland (1959)
- The Private Navy of Sgt. O'Farrell (1968)
- Czechoslovakia 1968 (1969)
