= West and East Mitten Buttes =

Buttes in Arizona, United States

West Mitten Butte
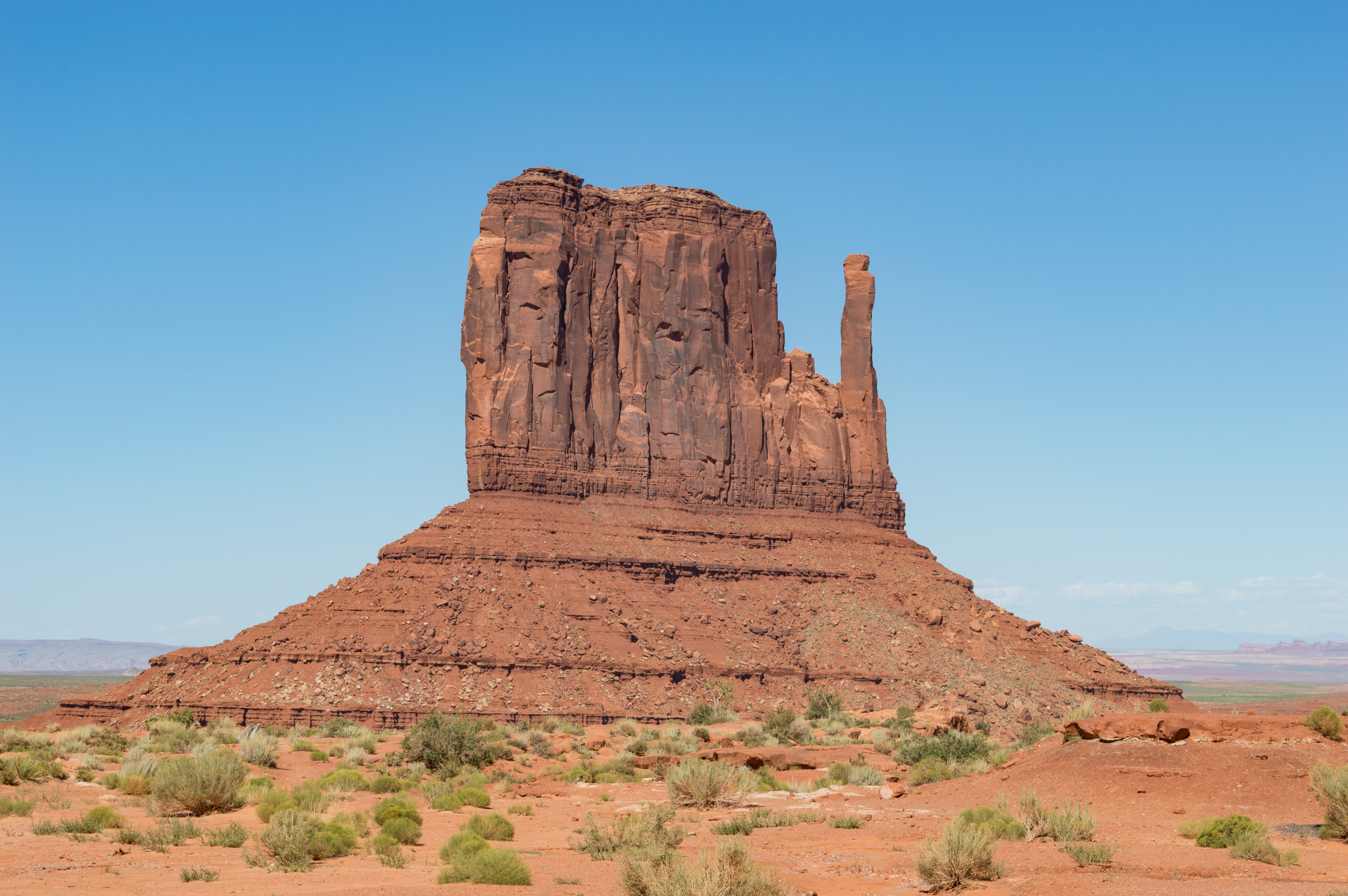

Highest point
- Elevation: 6,176 ft (1,882 m) NGVD 29
- Prominence: 856 ft (261 m)
- Coordinates: 36°59′27″N 110°05′46″W

Geography
- Location: Monument Valley, Arizona, U.S.
- Topo map: USGS Mitten Buttes

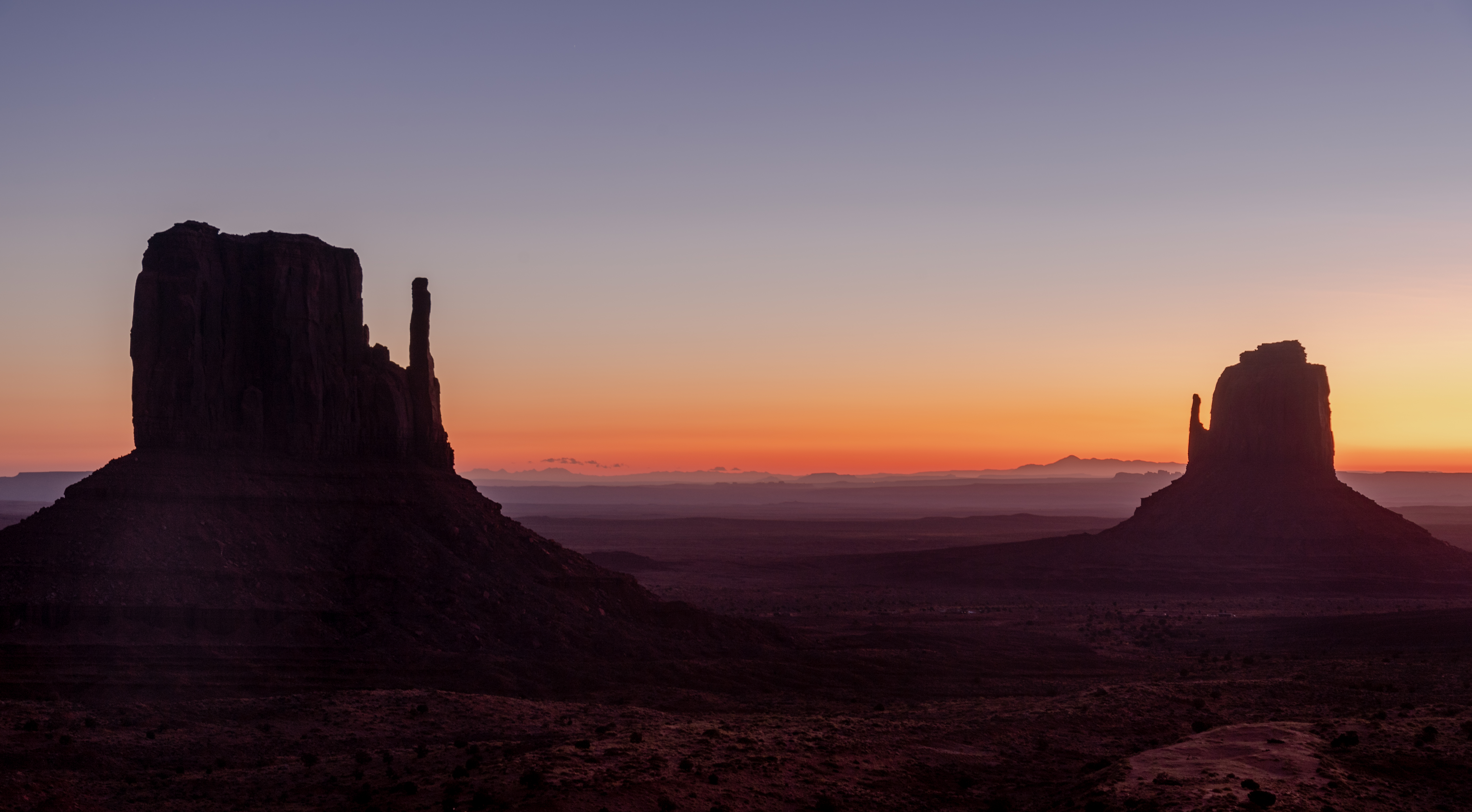
West Mitten Butte (left) and East Mitten Butte (right)

East Mitten Butte
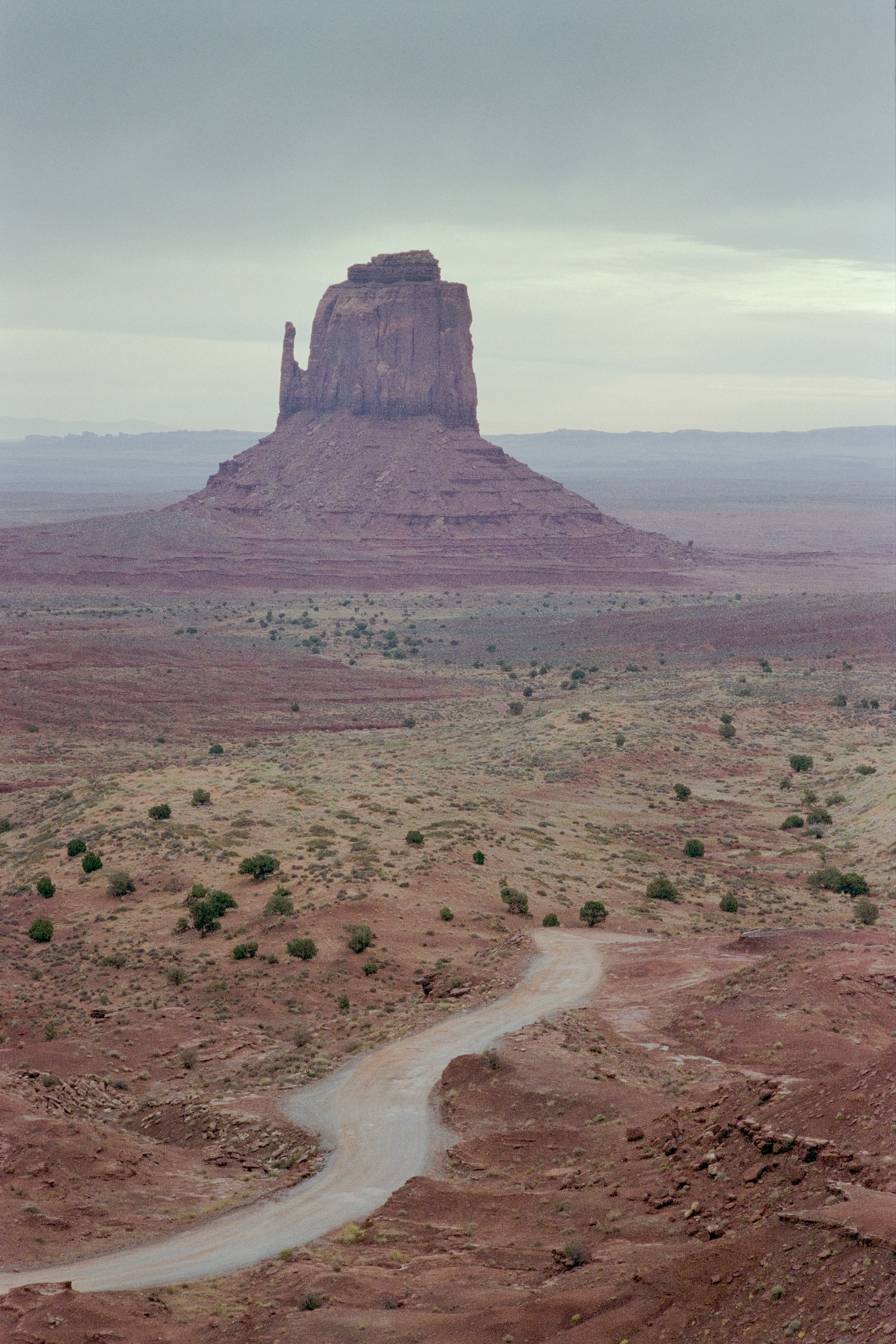

Highest point
- Elevation: 6,226 ft (1,898 m) NGVD 29
- Prominence: 1,026 ft (313 m)
- Coordinates: 36°59′18″N 110°04′11″W

Geography
- Location: Monument Valley, Arizona, U.S.
- Topo map: USGS Mitten Buttes

The West and East Mitten Buttes (also known as the Mittens) are two buttes in the Monument Valley Navajo Tribal Park in northeast Navajo County, Arizona. When viewed from the south, the buttes appear to be two giant mittens with their thumbs facing inwards.

The Mittens are about 0.6 mi (0.97 km) from the Arizona–Utah state line and West Mitten Butte is 1.1 mi (1.8 km) northeast of the park headquarters. The summit of West Mitten Butte is 6,176 ft (1,882 m) and East Mitten Butte is 6,226 ft (1,898 m) in elevation. The Mittens form a triangle with Merrick Butte about 2/3 mi (1.1 km) to the south and, with Sentinel Mesa, a more extensive plateau, towards the northwest. At the end of March and mid-September, for a few days only at sunset, the Mitten Shadow occurs, when the West Mitten shadow appears on the East Mitten.

The buttes are made of three principal rock layers. The lowest layer is Organ Rock Shale, the middle is de Chelly Sandstone, and the top layer is the Moenkopi Formation, capped by Shinarump Conglomerate.

== Gallery ==
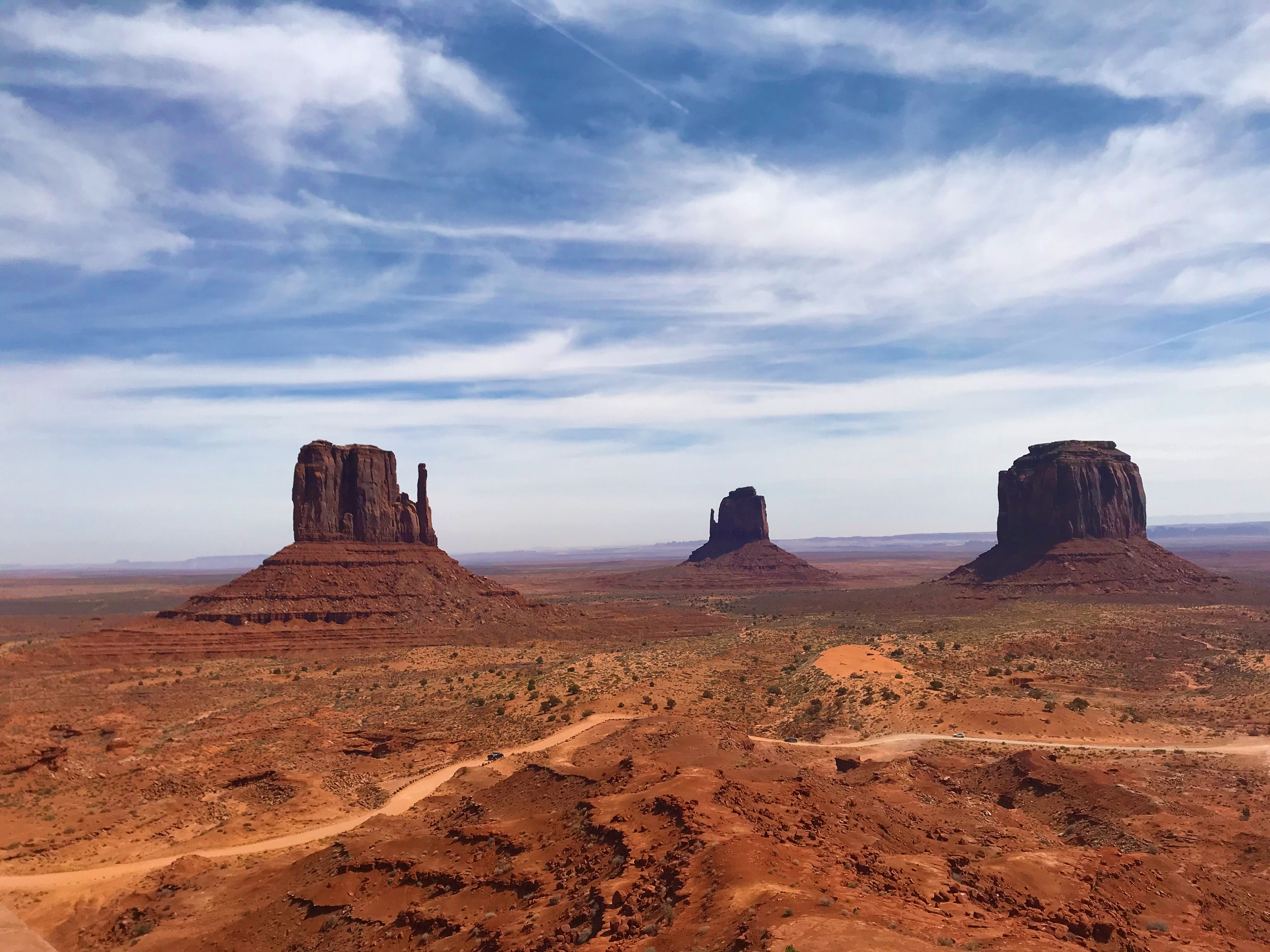
West Mitten Butte, East Mitten Butte and Merrick Butte

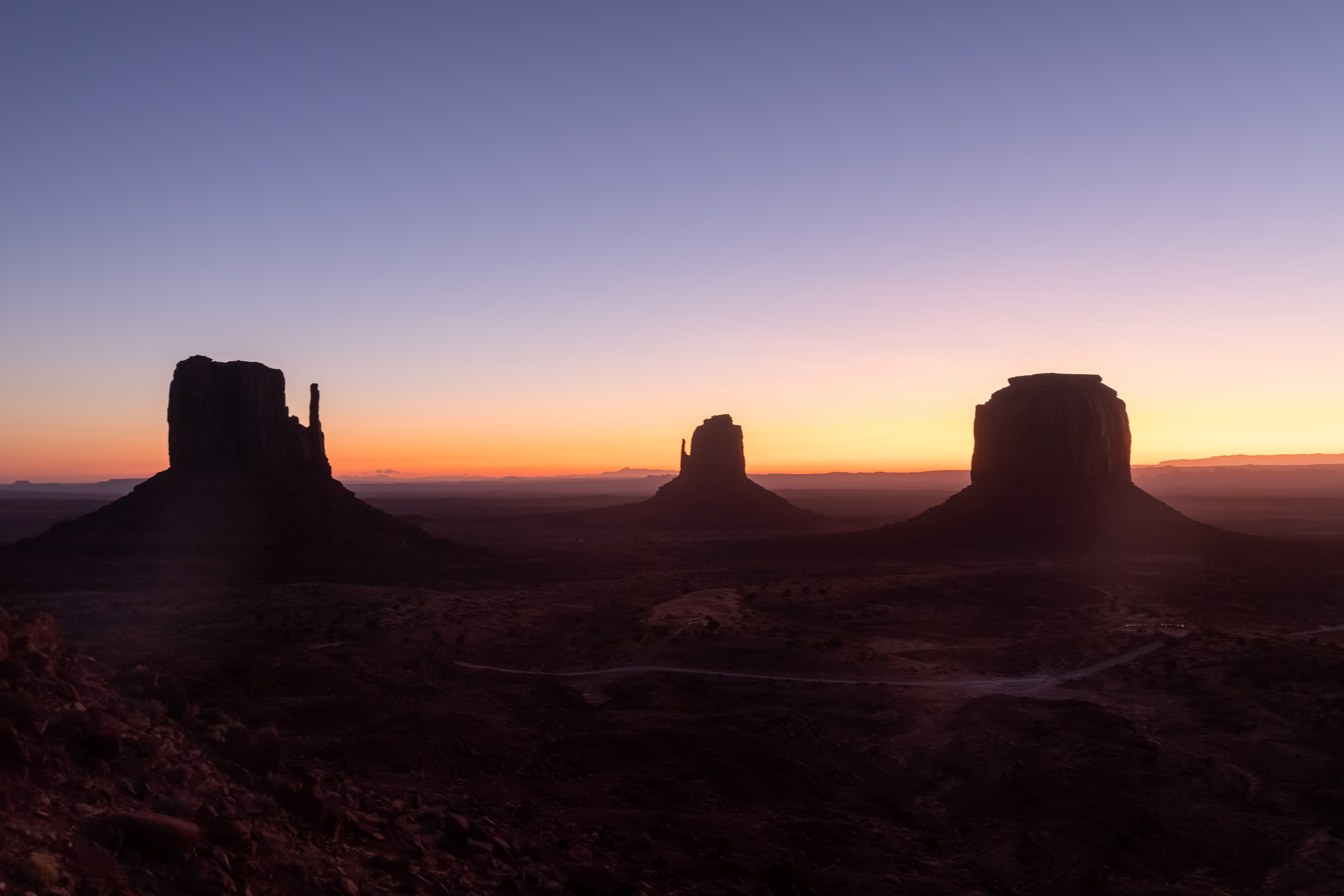
West Mitten Butte, East Mitten Butte and Merrick Butte before sunrise

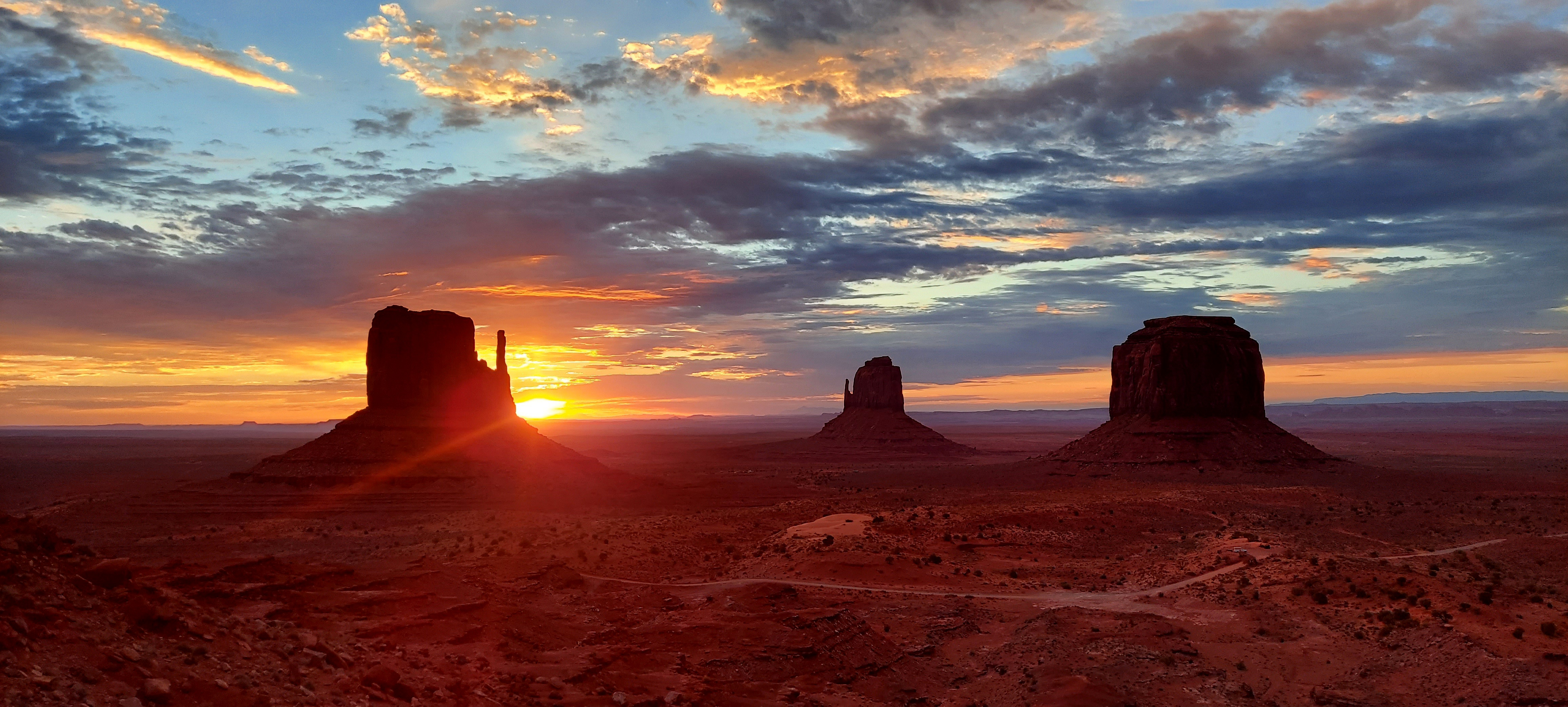
Sunrise by the Mitten Buttes

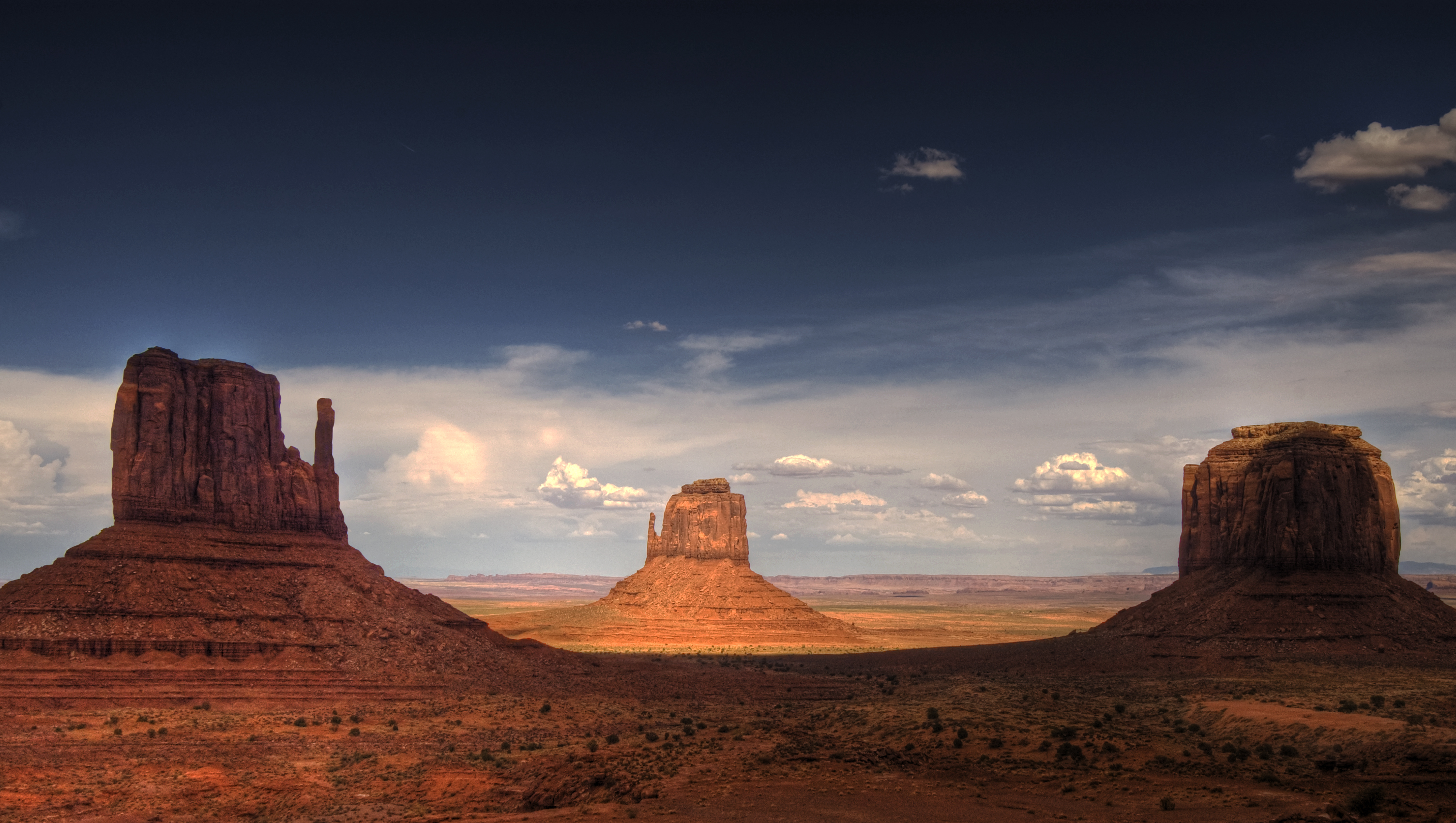
The Mittens and Merrick Butte (right foreground) form a triangle in Monument Valley.
