= The American West of John Ford =

The American West of John Ford is a 1971 television special documentary, directed by Denis Sanders, about movie director John Ford's career narrated by John Wayne, James Stewart, and Henry Fonda. Footage of Wayne, Stewart, and Fonda talking with the aging Ford are interspersed with an array of clips from Ford's films spanning more than five decades, including The Man Who Shot Liberty Valance, The Searchers, and Stagecoach, each of which is dealt with at some length.

== Claim about the influence of Wyatt Earp on Ford's Western films ==
The section on My Darling Clementine features Fonda and Stewart, both of whom played Wyatt Earp in Ford films, interviewing Ford about the director's claim that Earp himself had explained the strategy and chronology of the gunfight at the O.K. Corral to Ford and Harry Carey, complete with a sketched diagram, decades before Ford filmed a version of the melee with Fonda as Earp. Stewart's memorable poker scene as Earp in Cheyenne Autumn, which had nothing to do with the rest of the movie and has frequently been cut by exhibitors and television stations, is also discussed and illustrated with a clip.

== Broadcast history ==
The hour long special was telecast on December 5, 1971 over the CBS television network. The show sometimes appears on Hulu under the title The Great American West of John Ford. The documentary also briefly features a whip-cracking Andy Devine during a comedic sequence with Wayne and Ford filmed in Monument Valley.

== Production ==
Parts of the special were filmed in Monument Valley in Utah.
