= The Naked and the Dead (film) =

1958 film by Raoul Walsh

- Theatrical release poster
- Directed by: Raoul Walsh
- Screenplay by: Denis Sanders; Terry Sanders
- Based on: The Naked and the Dead by Norman Mailer
- Produced by: Paul Gregory
- Starring: Aldo Ray; Cliff Robertson; Raymond Massey; Lili St. Cyr; Barbara Nichols
- Cinematography: Joseph LaShelle
- Edited by: Arthur P. Schmidt
- Music by: Bernard Herrmann
- Production company: RKO Radio Pictures
- Distributed by: Warner Bros.
- Release date: August 6, 1958
- Running time: 131 minutes
- Country: United States
- Language: English
- Box office: $2.5 million

The Naked and the Dead is a 1958 American war film produced by RKO Radio Pictures and released by Warner Bros. Starring Aldo Ray, Cliff Robertson, and Raymond Massey, it was directed by Raoul Walsh and based on the 1948 novel of the same name by Norman Mailer. The screenplay was written by brothers Denis and Terry Sanders, and the film was shot in Panama on Technicolor film. It is one of the last films made by RKO before the studio's closure, and the last film that Walsh directed for Warner Bros. Lili St. Cyr and Barbara Nichols appear in support.

== Plot ==
During World War II, Lieutenant Hearn is an aide to General Cummings, who treats Hearn as a son and a friend. The general believes that commanding officers should induce fear in their subordinates in order to enforce discipline. Hearn expresses distaste for these views, preferring instead that soldiers should have mutual respect for one another, regardless of rank.

Hearn is transferred to lead an intelligence and reconnaissance platoon on a dangerous mission. The platoon had originally been led by Sergeant Croft, who now must serve under Hearn. Croft is a professional soldier with a reputation for cruelty. Hearn's idealistic approach is contrasted with Croft's desire to win at all costs. When Hearn considers abandoning the mission in the face of formidable Japanese opposition, Croft tricks him into underestimating the enemy. This eventually leads to several deaths in the platoon, and Hearn himself is wounded. Some of the men retreat, carrying Hearn on a stretcher. Croft presses onward with the remaining men. He is killed in action, but his men accomplish their mission, relaying vital intelligence to headquarters. Hearn's men consider leaving him to die, as they can escape faster on their own, but continue carrying him despite the risk.

Upon receiving the platoon's report, a subordinate of Cummings orders an immediate large-scale assault on the Japanese position, scoring a major victory despite Cummings' harsh skepticism. The survivors of the platoon, including Hearn, are able to reach headquarters. Once there, Hearn tells the chastized Cummings that the men who carried him on a stretcher did so out of love, and that the human spirit will always be too strong to be cowed by any terror imposed by other men.

== Cast ==
- Aldo Ray as Staff Sergeant Sam Croft
- Cliff Robertson as First Lieutenant Robert Hearn
- Raymond Massey as Brigadier General Cummings
- Lili St. Cyr as Willa Mae / Lily
- Barbara Nichols as Mildred Croft
- William Campbell as Brown
- Richard Jaeckel as Gallagher
- James Best as Rhidges
- Joey Bishop as Roth
- Jerry Paris as Goldstein
- Robert Gist as "Red"
- L. Q. Jones as Woodrow "Woody" Wilson
- Max Showalter as Lieutenant Colonel Dalleson (credited as Casey Adams)
- John Beradino as Captain Mantelli (credited as John Berardino)
- Edward McNally as Cohn
- Greg Roman as Minetta
- Jann Darlyn as Betty

== Production ==
The film was originally to be produced by Paul Gregory and directed by Charles Laughton, and was to be made after The Night of the Hunter. Terry and Dennis Sanders were hired as writers. Stanley Cortez, who had photographed The Night of the Hunter, was intended to be the cinematographer. Press releases announced that Robert Mitchum was to star and that Walter Schumann would compose the score. Following the box-office failure of The Night of the Hunter, Raoul Walsh replaced Laughton and recruited an uncredited writer to rewrite the Sanders Brothers screenplay. Cortez was replaced by Joseph LaShelle.

Producer Paul Gregory later recalled Laughton's involvement: "Laughton admired parts of the book. I thought it was wonderful and still do. Mailer was so young, yet he had this ability to put into words a vision. It's a war story, but it's more about people in war than war itself. There are no major battles, but the characters and the jungle episodes were quite wonderful. I particularly loved the changes that the little Jewish boy [Roth] went through. His character was essential to the story. If we could have done Laughton's script, it would have been magnificent."

The Naked and the Dead was filmed on location in Panama with 250 American soldiers as extras. Hawaiian-born soldiers of Japanese descent were cast as Japanese soldiers and local actors from the Canal Zone Theatre Guild appeared in the film.

The film was produced in RKO-Scope, but when it was acquired by Warner Bros. Pictures, it was billed as a WarnerScope film on release.

== Reception ==
In August 1958, A.H. Weiler of The New York Times found the picture disappointing: "Credit director [Raoul Walsh], producer Paul Gregory and especially the writing team of Denis and Terry Sanders with laundering the billingsgate of the original and in extracting the derring-do of the author's impassioned work. But in so doing they have simply come up with a surface recounting of a platoon doomed to decimation in securing a small island in the Pacific in 1943. They have quickly limned a general who is a black-and-white militarist, nothing more, and of officers who only appear as quickly passing figures in a kaleidoscope of briefings and small talk."

Rotten Tomatoes gives the film a rating of 83% on its Tomatometer, based on six reviews.
