= Academy Award for Best Director =

Category of film award

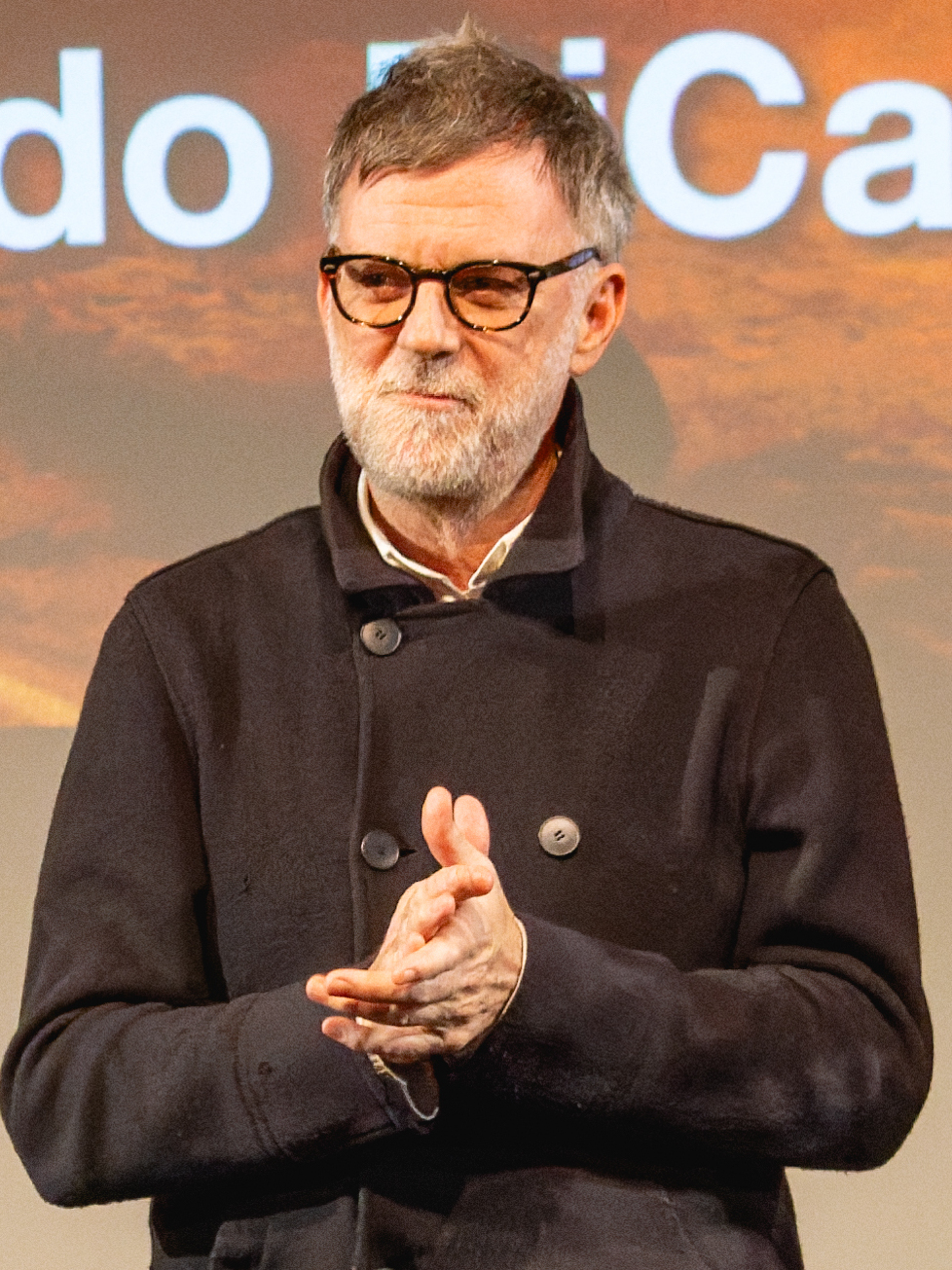
- The 2026 recipient: Paul Thomas Anderson
- Awarded for: Excellence in Cinematic Direction Achievement
- Country: United States
- Presented by: Academy of Motion Picture Arts and Sciences (AMPAS)
- First award: May 16, 1929; 97 years ago (for films released during the 1927/1928 film season)
- Most recent winner: Paul Thomas Anderson, One Battle After Another (2025)

Highlights
- Most awards: John Ford (4)
- Most nominations: William Wyler (12)
- Website: oscars.org

The Academy Award for Best Director (officially known as the Academy Award of Merit for Directing) is an award presented annually by the Academy of Motion Picture Arts and Sciences (AMPAS). It is given in honor of a film director who has exhibited outstanding directing while working in the film industry.

The 1st Academy Awards ceremony was held in 1929 with the award being split into "Dramatic" and "Comedy" categories; Frank Borzage and Lewis Milestone won for 7th Heaven and Two Arabian Knights, respectively. However, these categories were merged for all subsequent ceremonies. Nominees are determined by single transferable vote within the directors branch of AMPAS; winners are selected by a plurality vote from the entire eligible voting members of the academy.

For the first eleven years of the Academy Awards, directors were allowed to be nominated for multiple films in the same year. However, after the nomination of Michael Curtiz for two films, Angels with Dirty Faces and Four Daughters, at the 11th Academy Awards, the rules were revised so that an individual could only be nominated for one film at each ceremony. That rule has since been amended, although the only director who has received multiple nominations in the same year was Steven Soderbergh for Erin Brockovich and Traffic in 2000, winning the award for the latter.

The Academy Awards for Best Director and Best Picture have been very closely linked throughout their history. Of the 92 films that won Best Picture and were also nominated for Best Director, 71 won the award. The award has been criticised in recent years for failing to recognise female directors. Of the 260 individual directors nominated in the history of the award, only 9 have been women, with only 2 women having been nominated more than once (compared to 101 men), and only 3 of the 77 individual winners have been women.

Since its inception, the award has been given to 75 different directors or directing teams. As of the 98th Academy Awards ceremony, American filmmaker Paul Thomas Anderson is the most recent winner in this category for his work on One Battle After Another.

== Winners and nominees ==
In the following table, the years are listed as per Academy convention, and generally correspond to the year of film release in Los Angeles County, California; the ceremonies are always held the following year. For the first five ceremonies, the eligibility period spanned twelve months from August 1 to July 31. For the 6th ceremony held in 1934, the eligibility period lasted from August 1, 1932, to December 31, 1933. Since the 7th ceremony held in 1935, the period of eligibility became the full previous calendar year from January 1 to December 31.

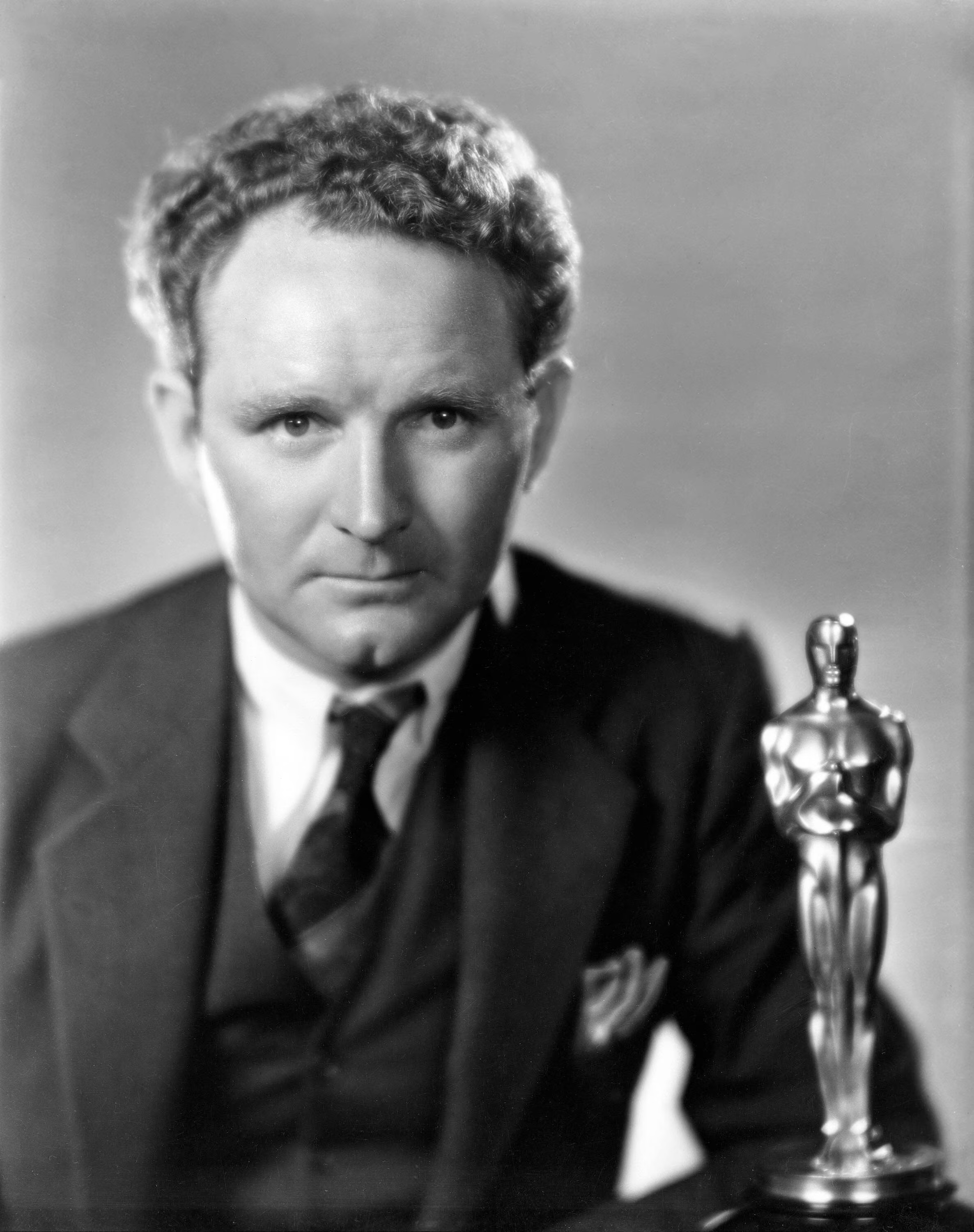
Frank Borzage won twice: "Dramatic director" at the first ceremony, for 7th Heaven (1927); & later, Bad Girl (1931).

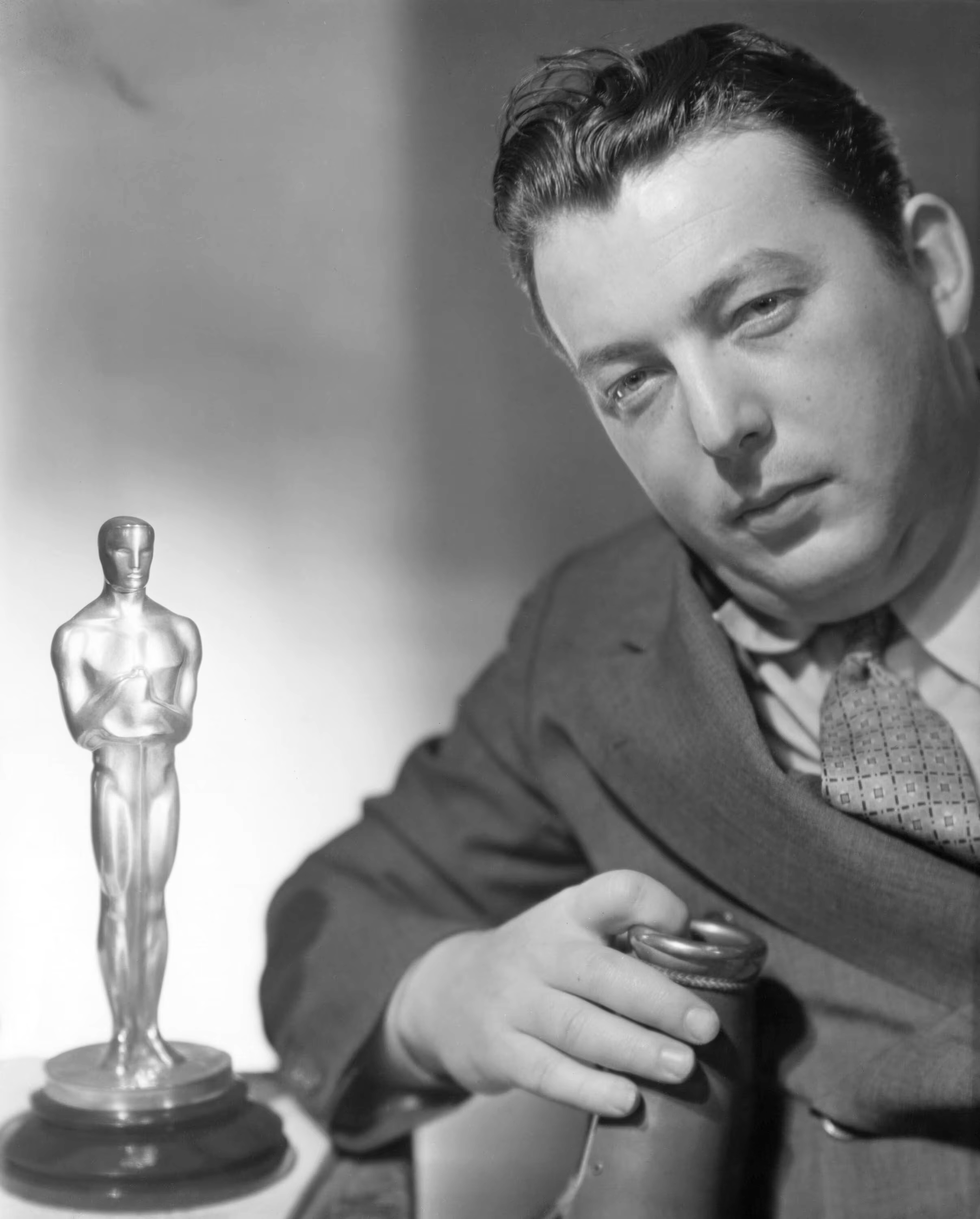
Lewis Milestone won twice: "Comedy director" at the first ceremony, for Two Arabian Knights (1927); & later, All Quiet on the Western Front (1930).

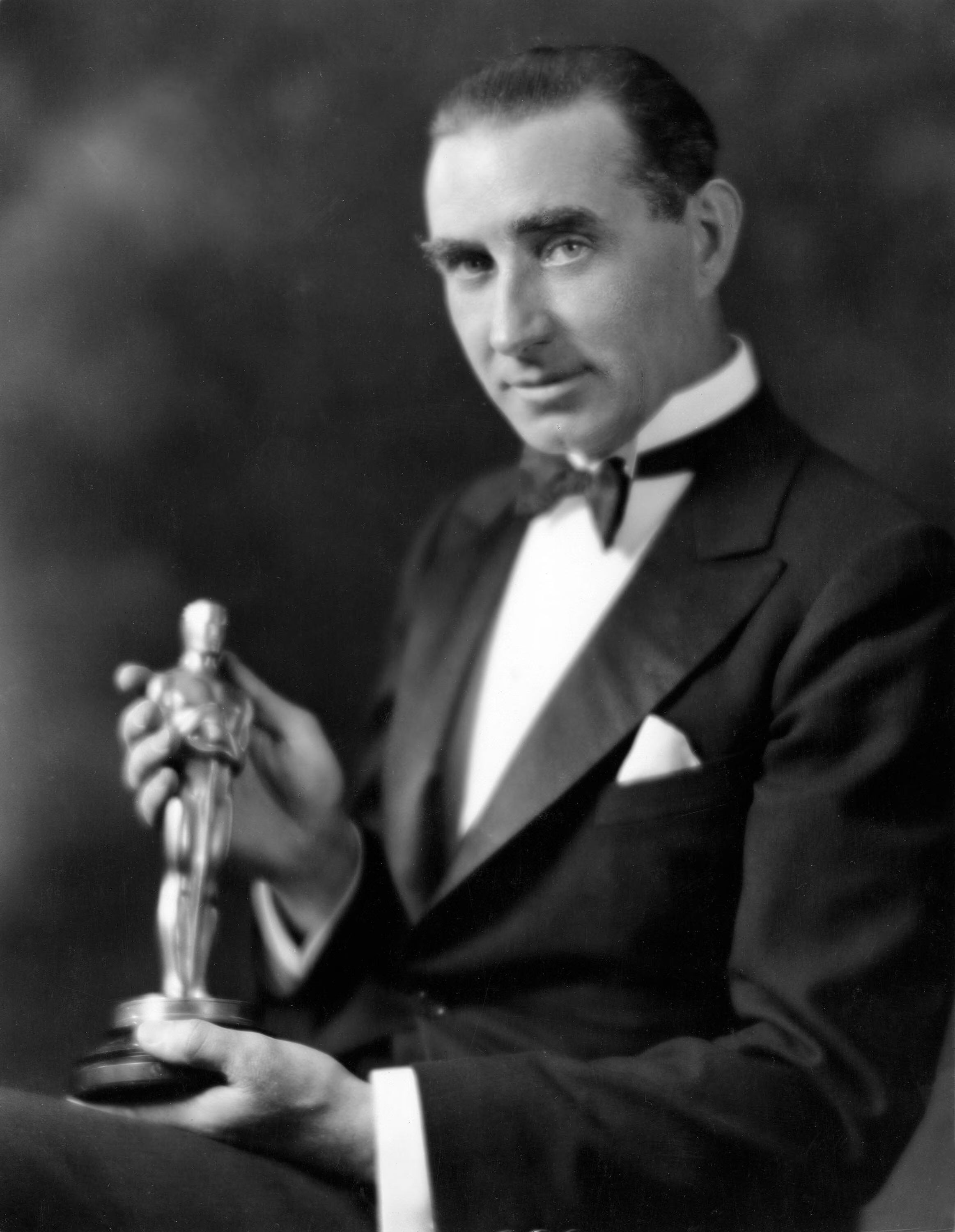
Frank Lloyd won twice, for The Divine Lady (1929) & Cavalcade (1933).

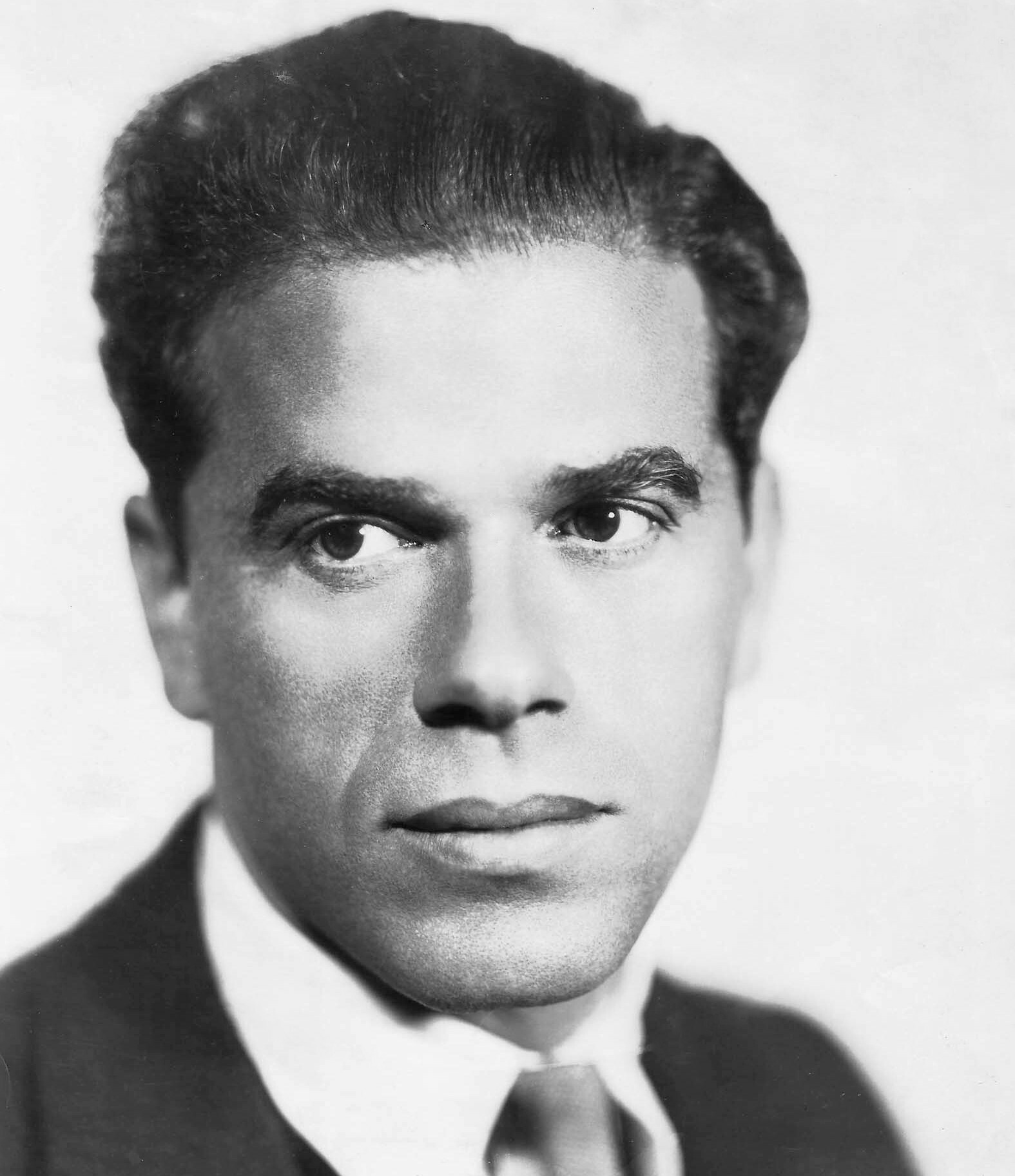
Frank Capra won thrice, for It Happened One Night (1934), Mr. Deeds Goes to Town (1936), & You Can't Take It with You (1938).

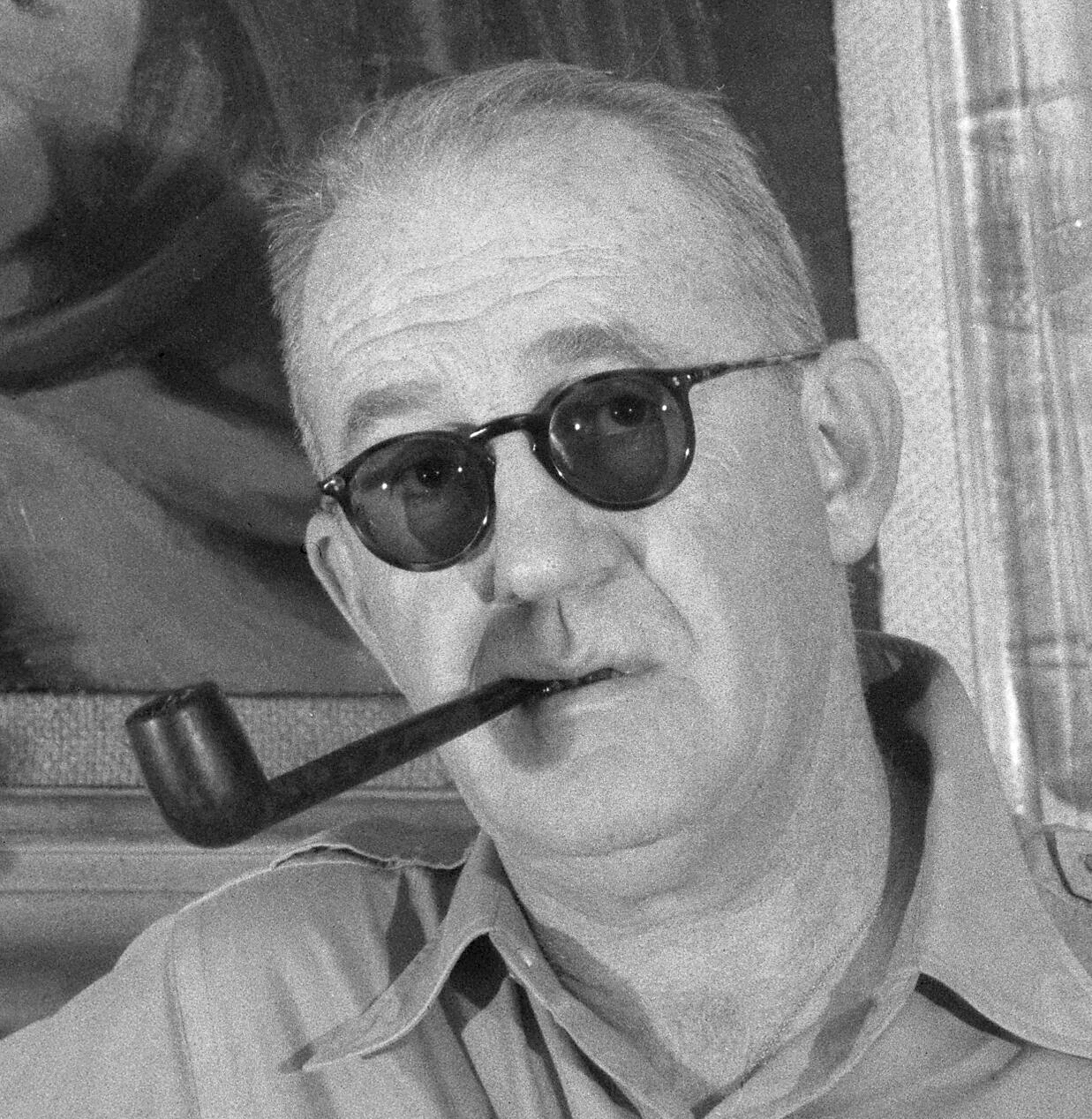
John Ford won a record four times, for: The Informer (1935), The Grapes of Wrath (1940), How Green Was My Valley (1941), & The Quiet Man (1952).

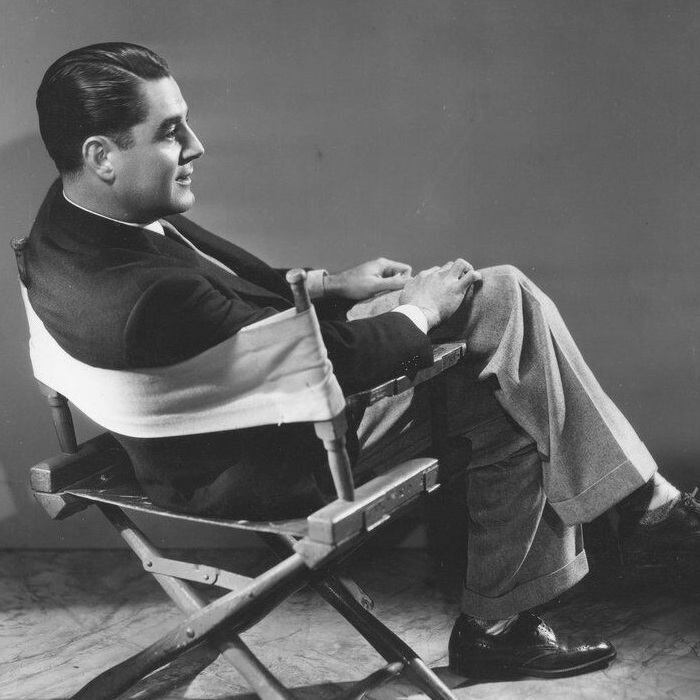
Leo McCarey won twice, for The Awful Truth (1937) & Going My Way (1944).

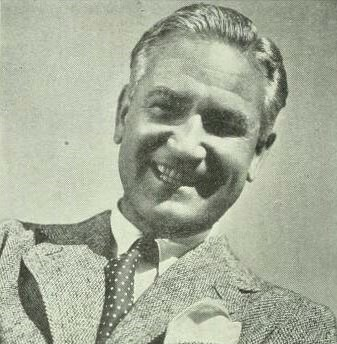
Victor Fleming won for Gone with the Wind (1939).

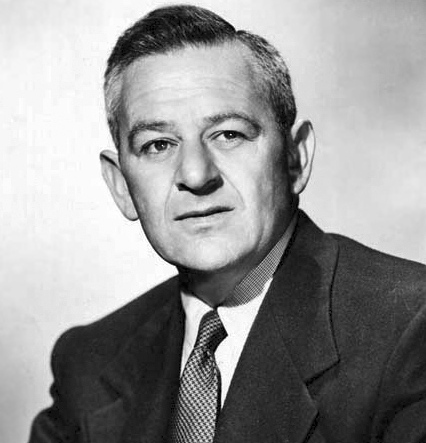
William Wyler, with a record twelve nominations, won thrice, for: Mrs. Miniver (1942), The Best Years of Our Lives (1946), & Ben-Hur (1959).

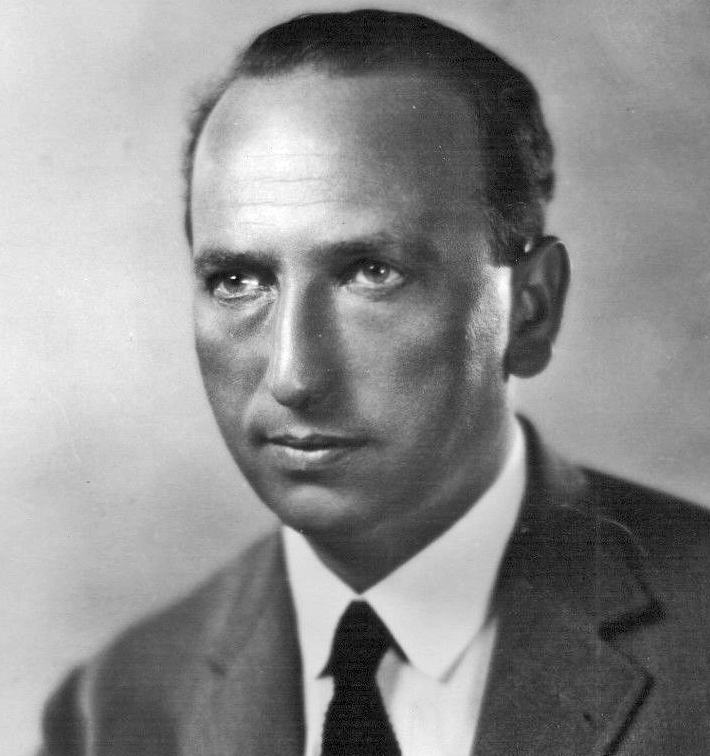
Michael Curtiz won for Casablanca (1942).

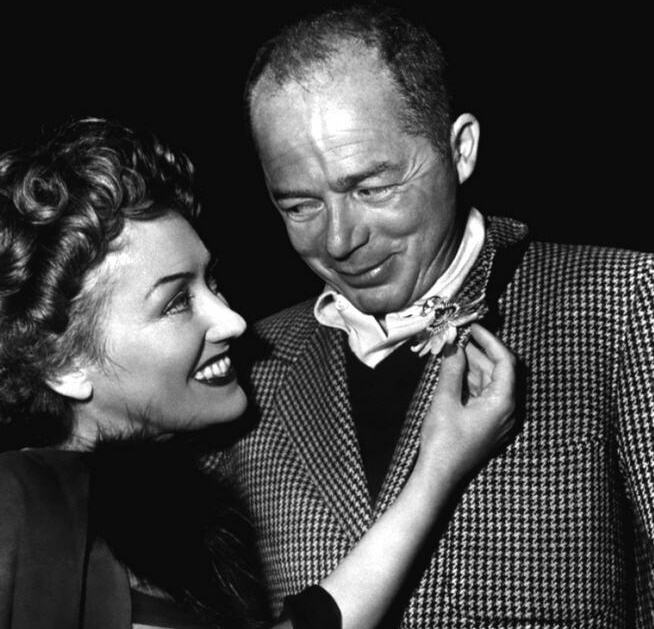
Billy Wilder (right, with Gloria Swanson) won twice, for The Lost Weekend (1945) & The Apartment (1960).

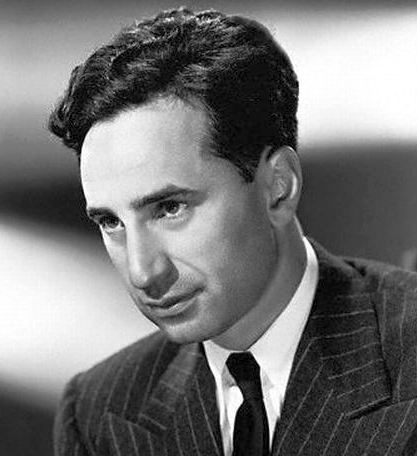
Elia Kazan won twice, for Gentleman's Agreement (1947) & On the Waterfront (1954).

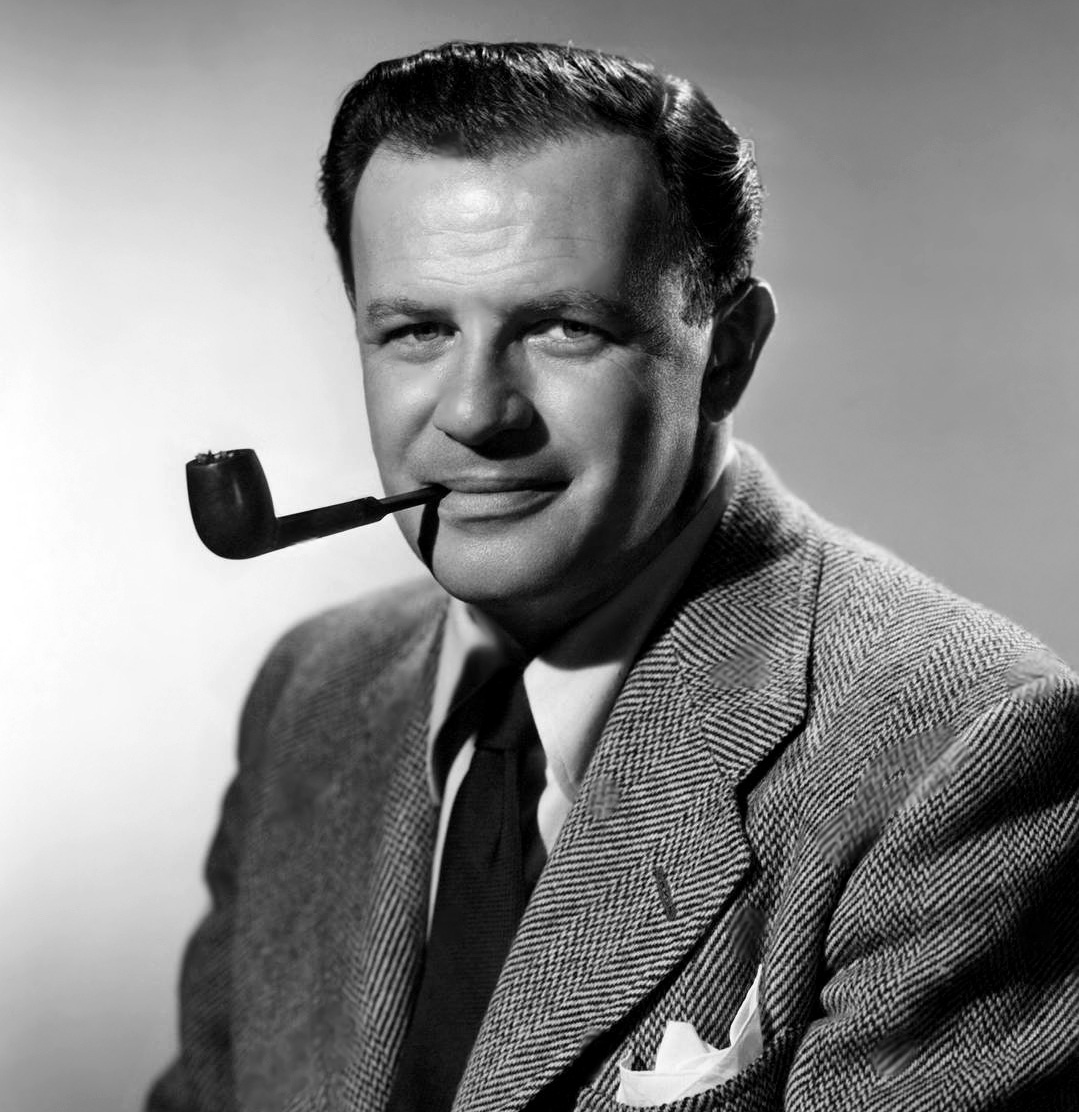
Joseph L. Mankiewicz won twice consecutively, for A Letter to Three Wives (1949) & All About Eve (1950).

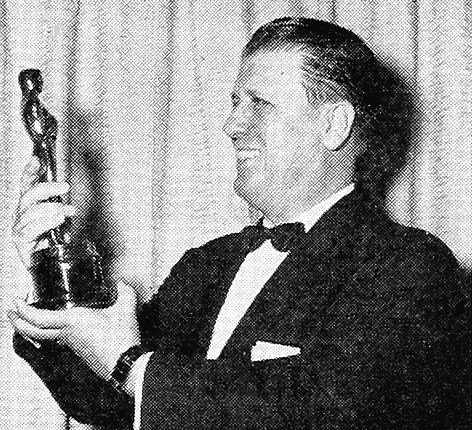
George Stevens won twice, for A Place in the Sun (1951) & Giant (1956).

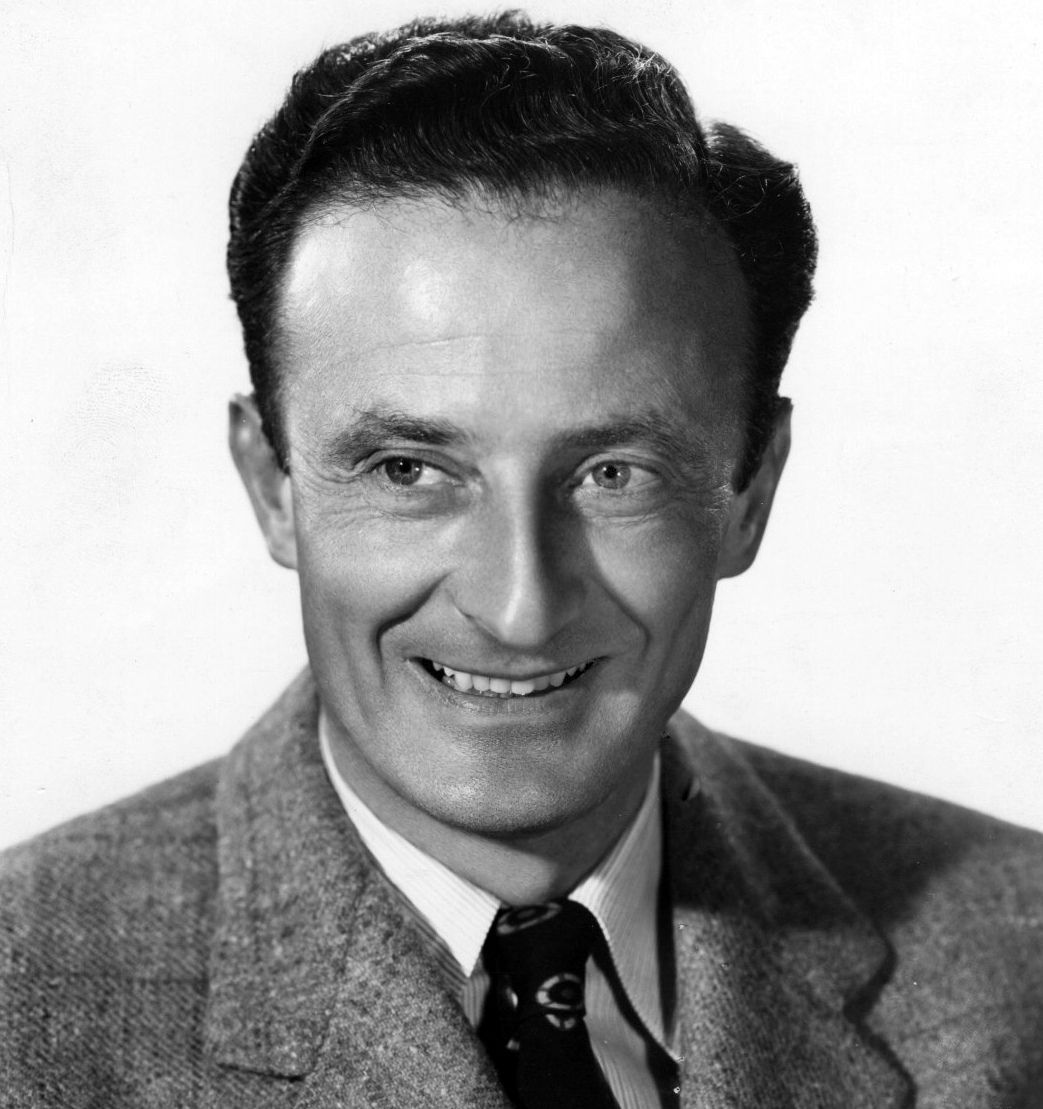
Fred Zinnemann won twice, for From Here to Eternity (1953) & A Man for All Seasons (1966).

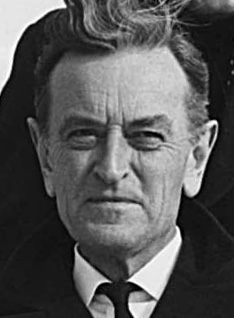
David Lean won twice, for The Bridge on the River Kwai (1957) & Lawrence of Arabia (1962).

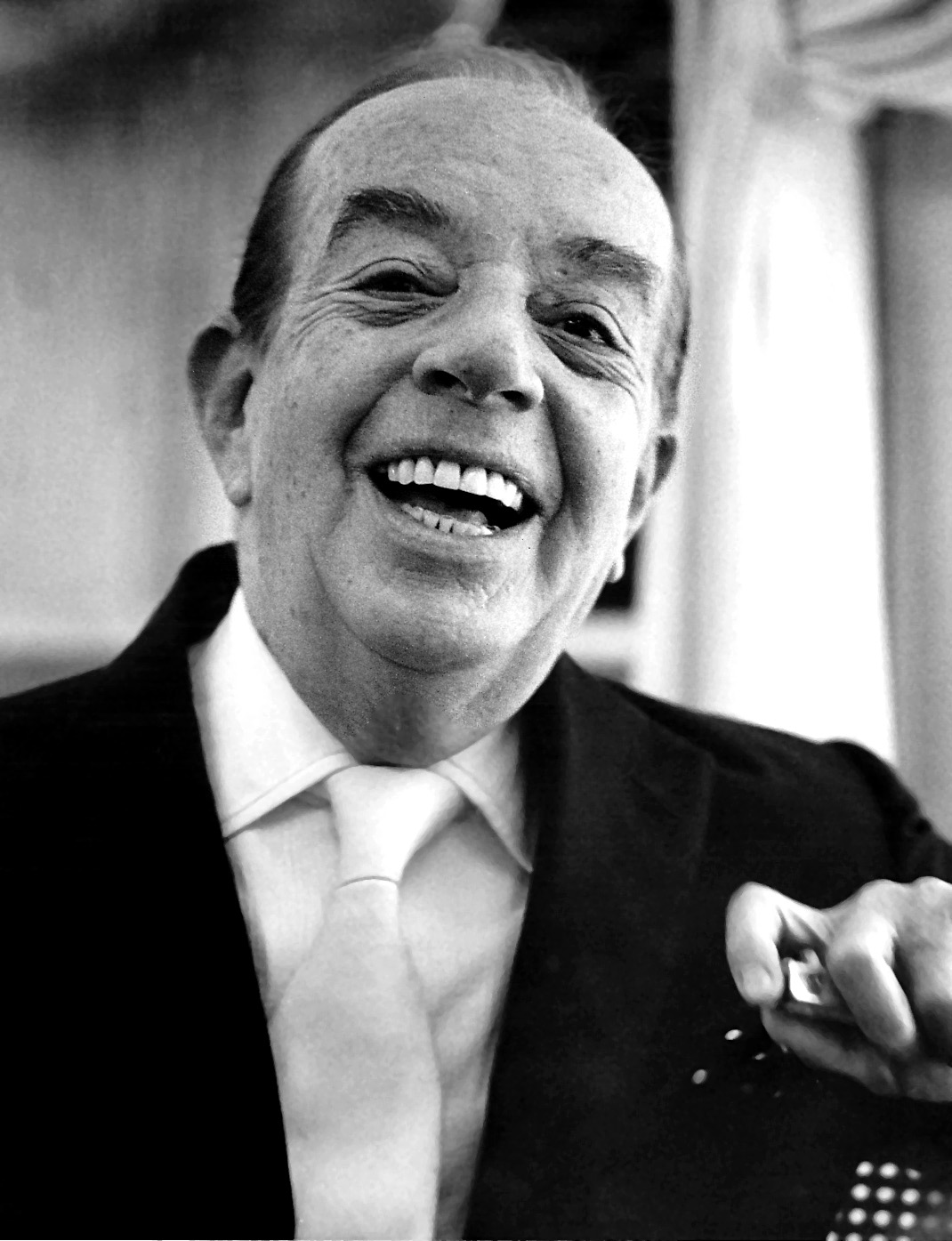
Vincente Minnelli won for Gigi (1958).

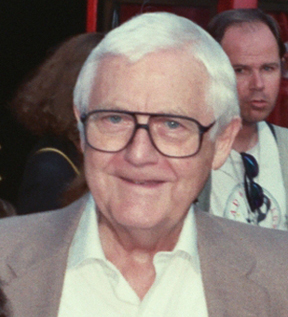
Robert Wise won twice: jointly with Jerome Robbins (an Oscars first) for West Side Story (1961) & solo for The Sound of Music (1965).

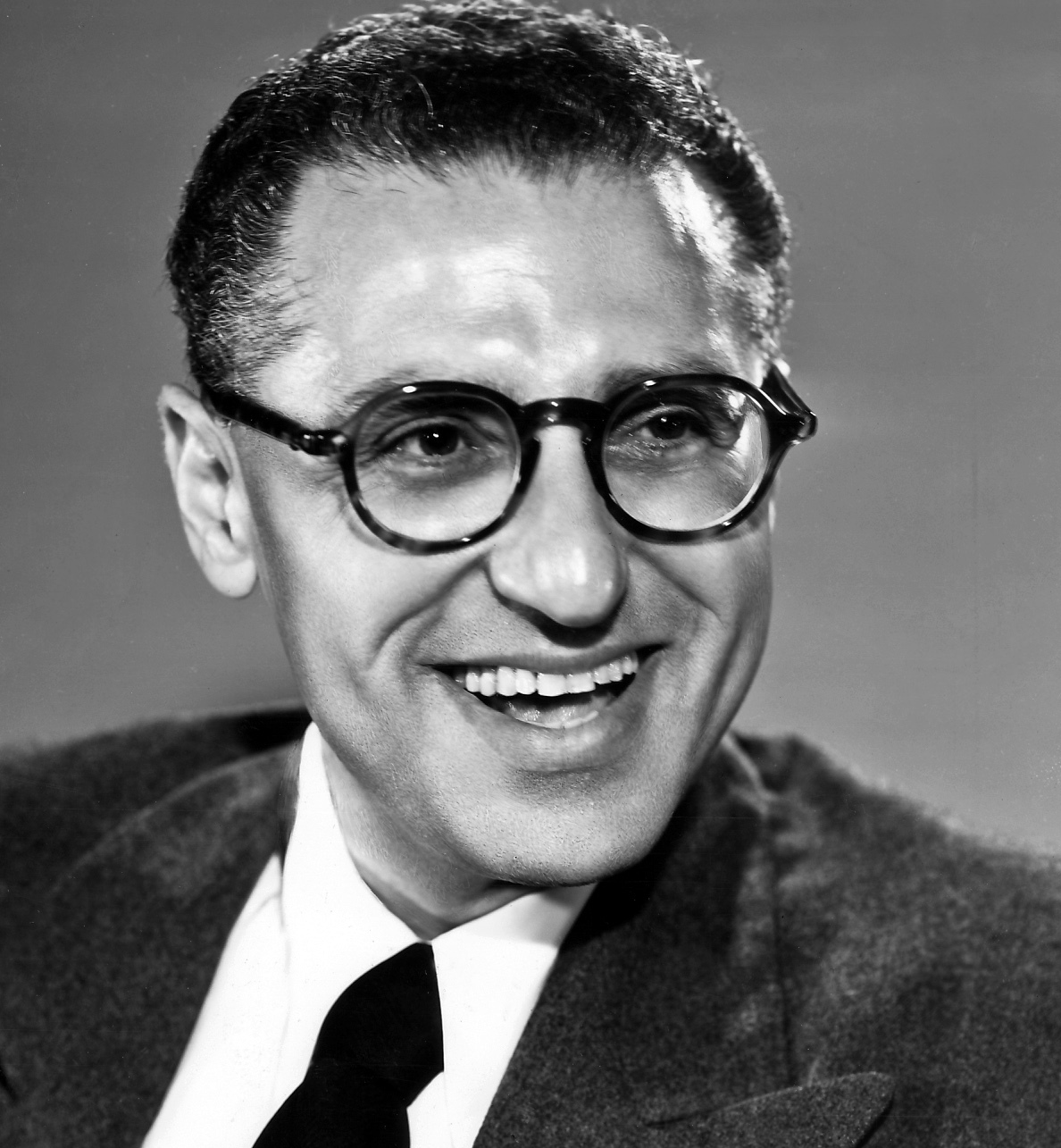
George Cukor won for My Fair Lady (1964).

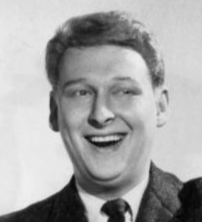
Mike Nichols won for The Graduate (1967).

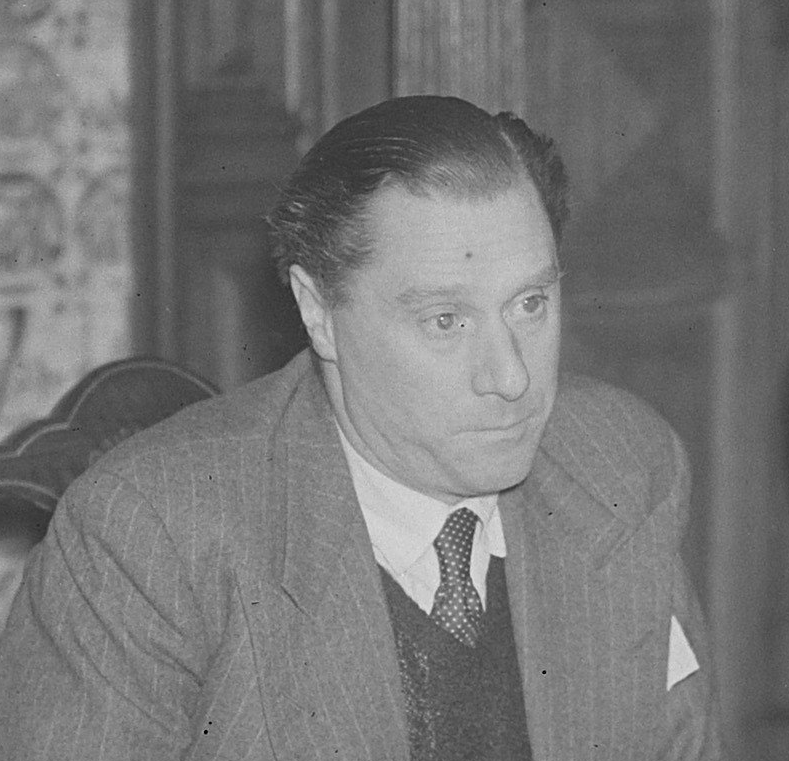
Carol Reed won for Oliver! (1968).

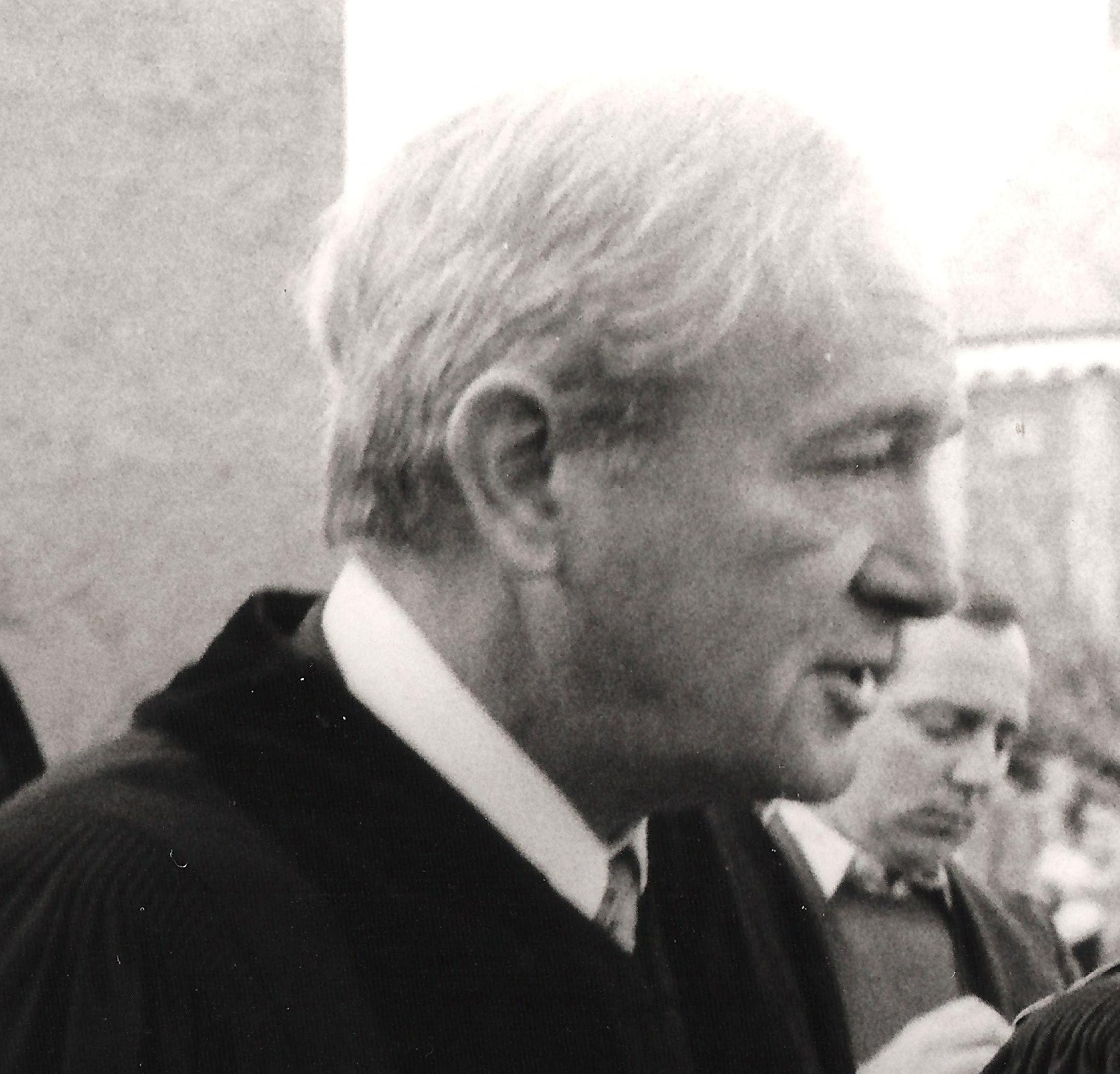
Franklin J. Schaffner won for Patton (1970).

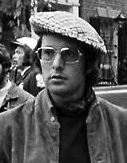
William Friedkin won for The French Connection (1971).

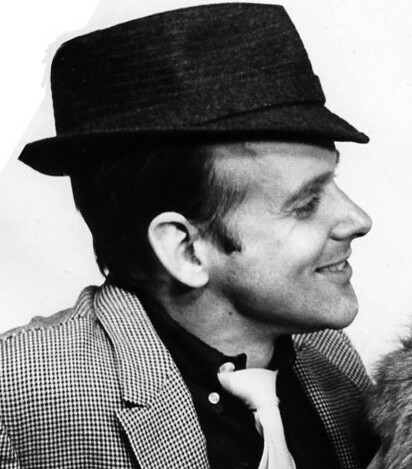
Bob Fosse won for Cabaret (1972).

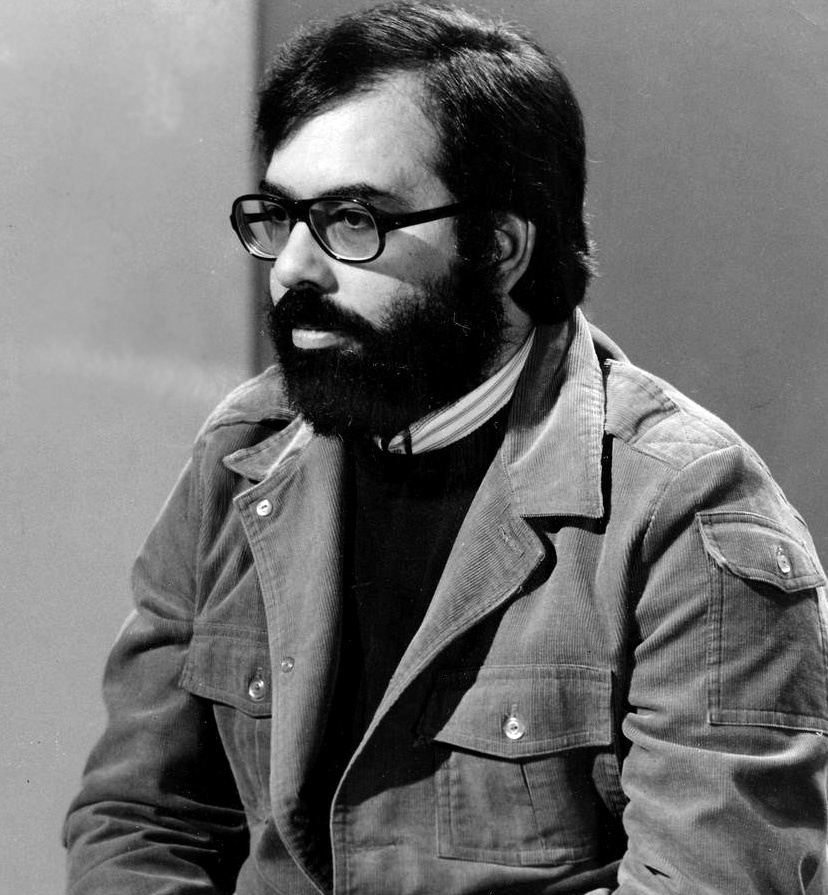
Francis Ford Coppola won for The Godfather Part II (1974).

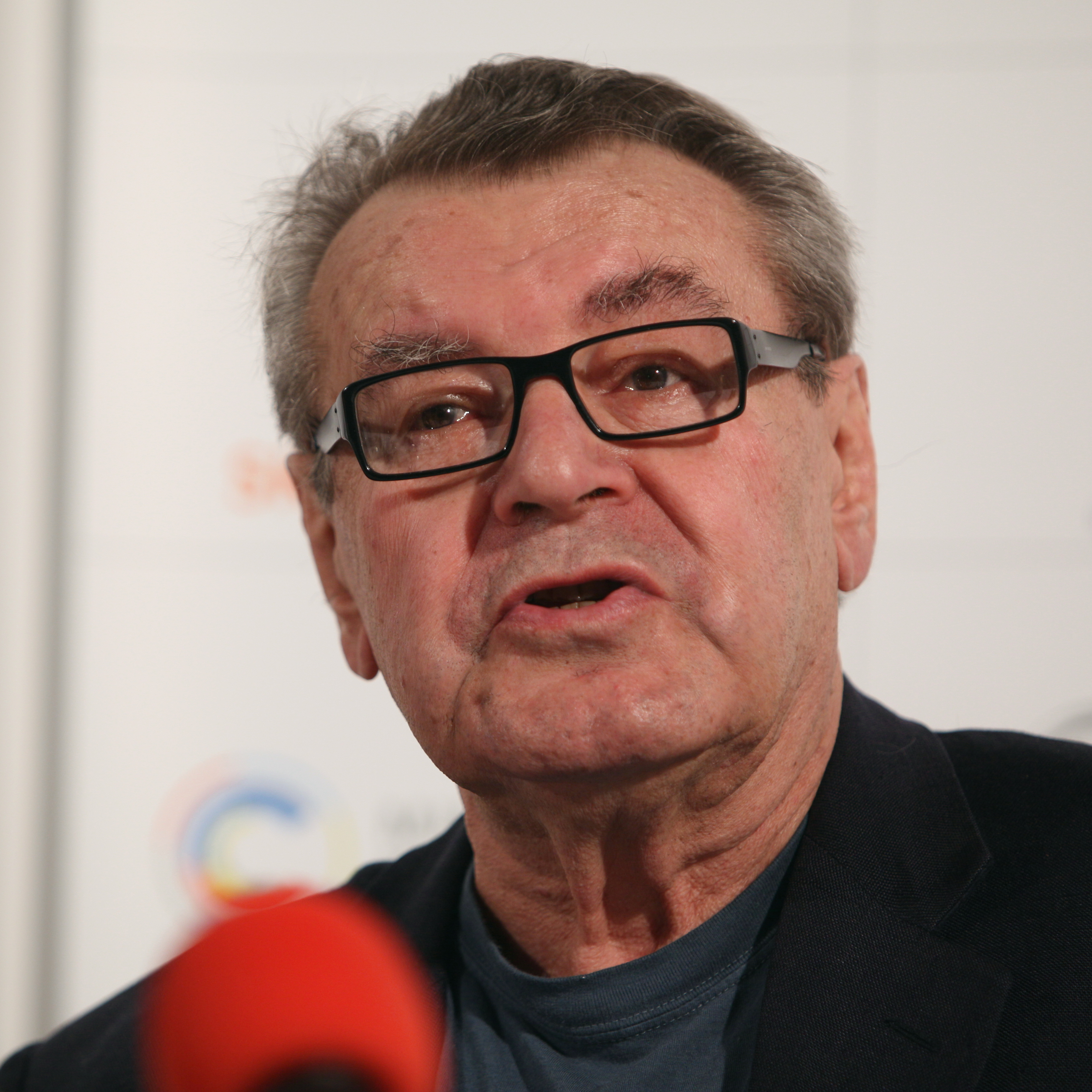
Miloš Forman won twice, for One Flew Over the Cuckoo's Nest (1975) & Amadeus (1984).

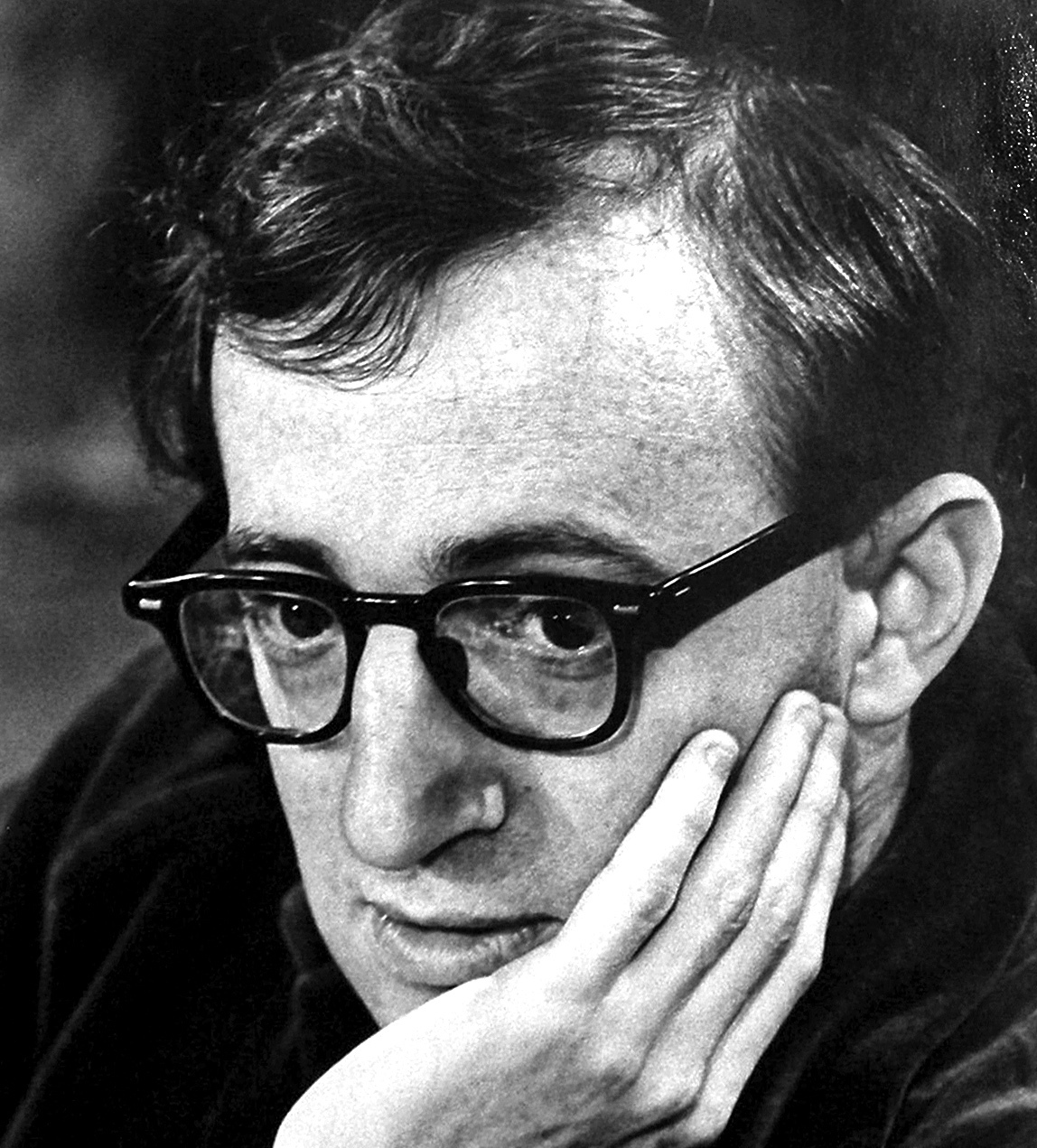
Woody Allen won for Annie Hall (1977).

Michael Cimino won for The Deer Hunter (1978).

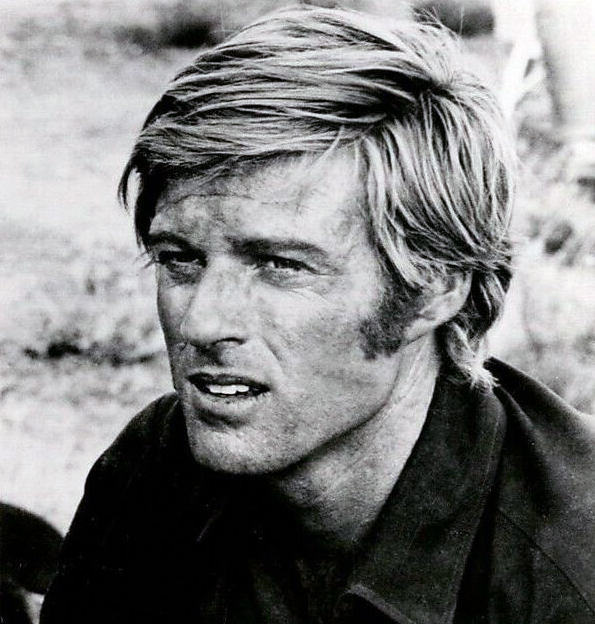
Robert Redford won for Ordinary People (1980).

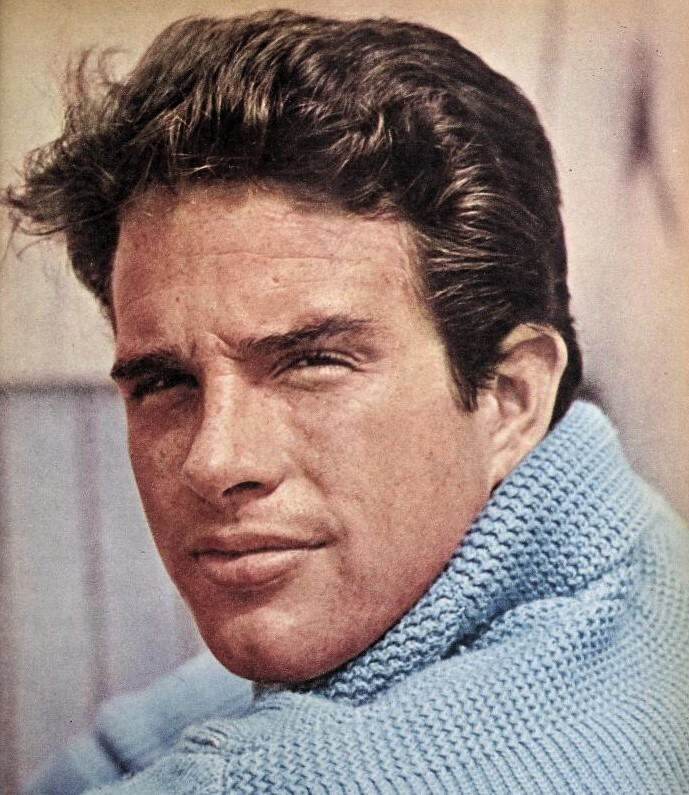
Warren Beatty won for Reds (1981).

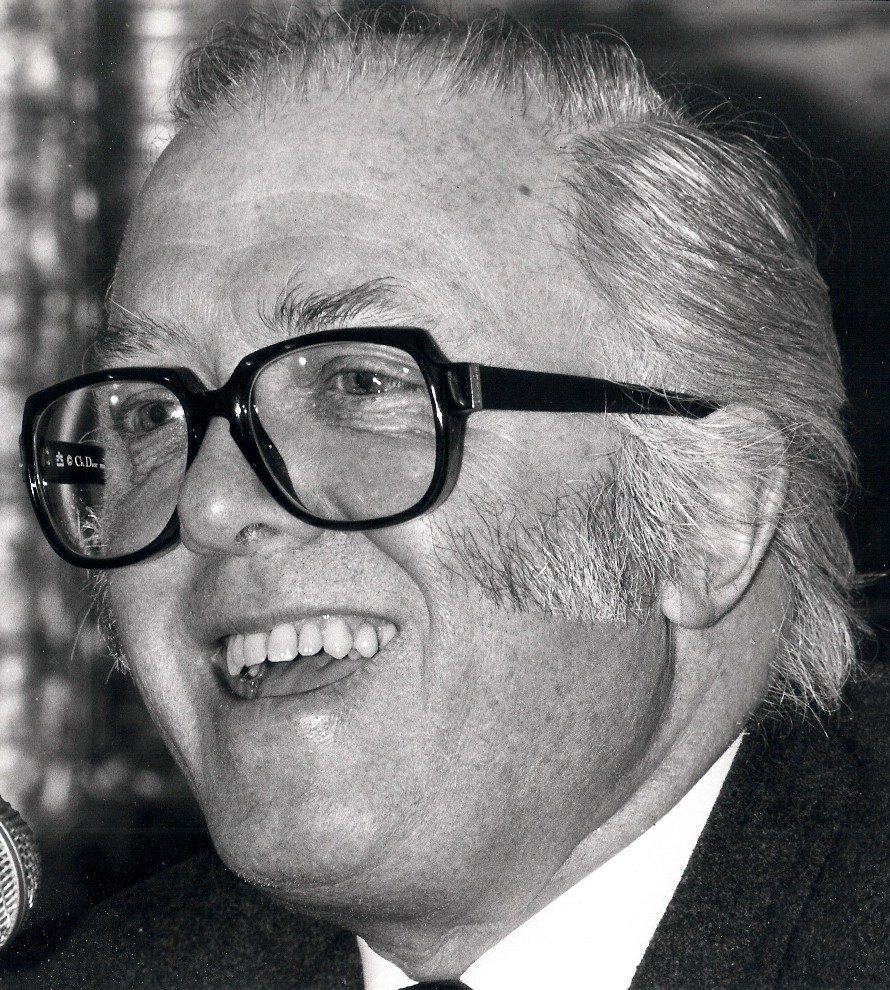
Richard Attenborough won for Gandhi (1982).

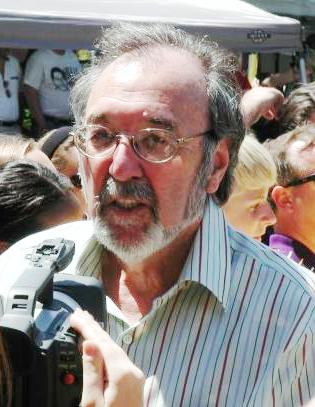
James L. Brooks won for Terms of Endearment (1983).

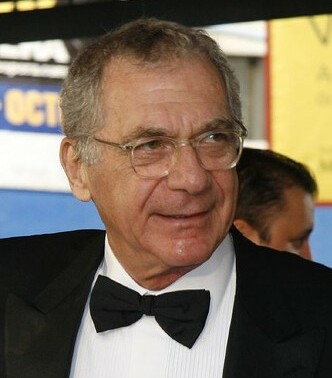
Sydney Pollack won for Out of Africa (1985).

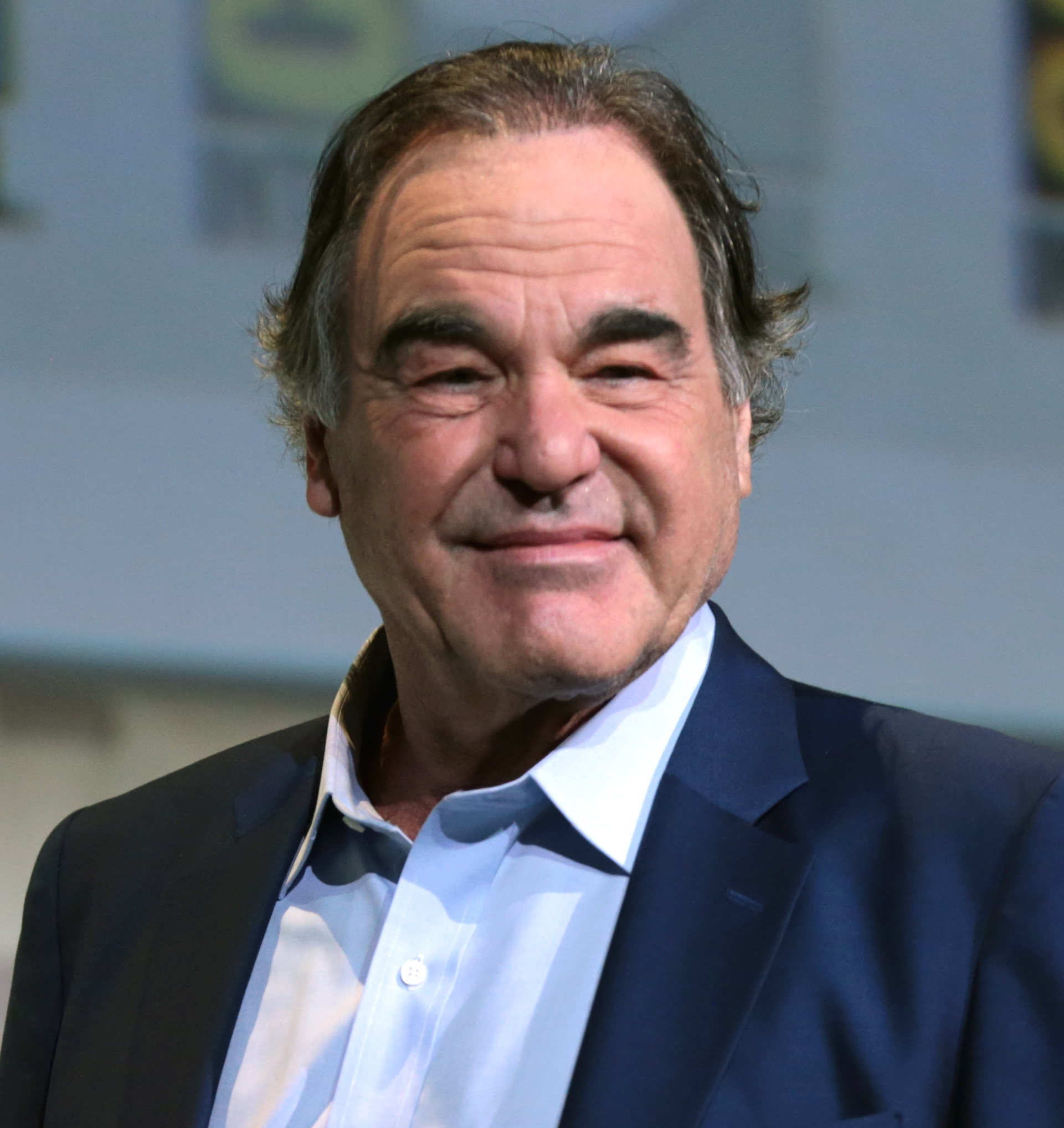
Oliver Stone won twice, for Platoon (1986) & Born on the Fourth of July (1989).

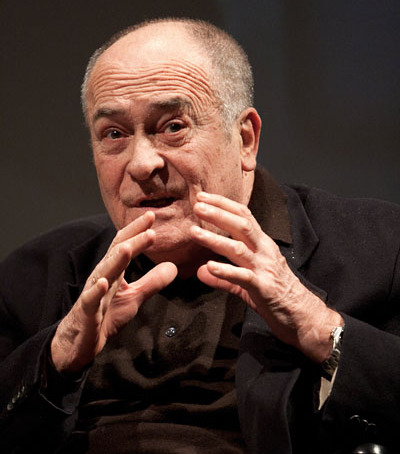
Bernardo Bertolucci won for The Last Emperor (1987).

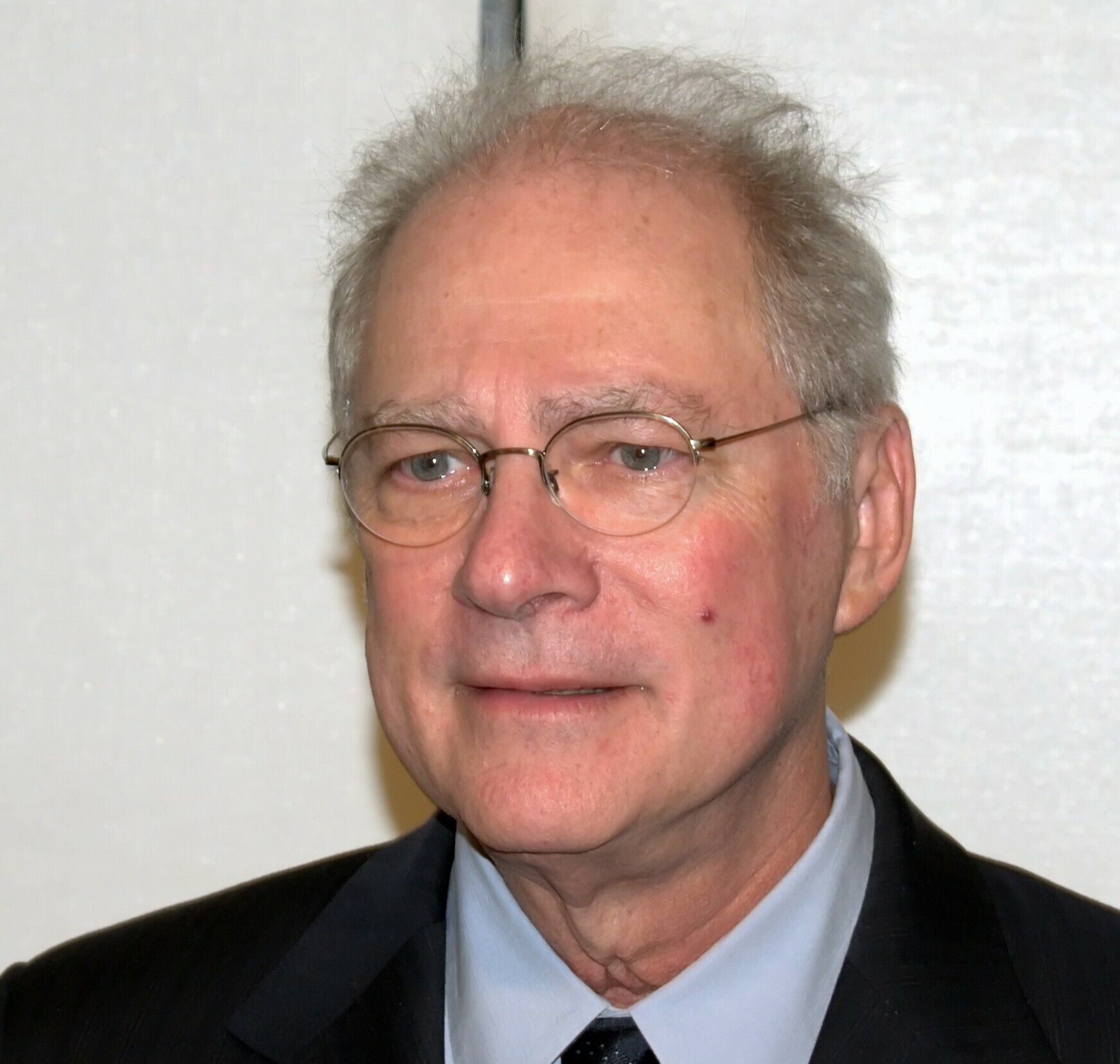
Barry Levinson won for Rain Man (1988).

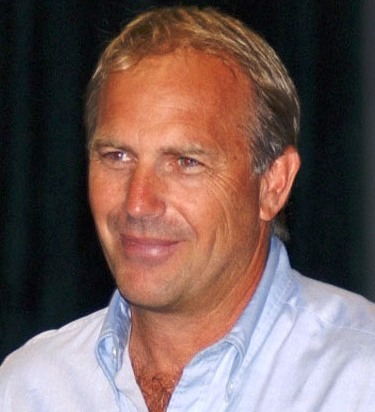
Kevin Costner won for Dances With Wolves (1990).

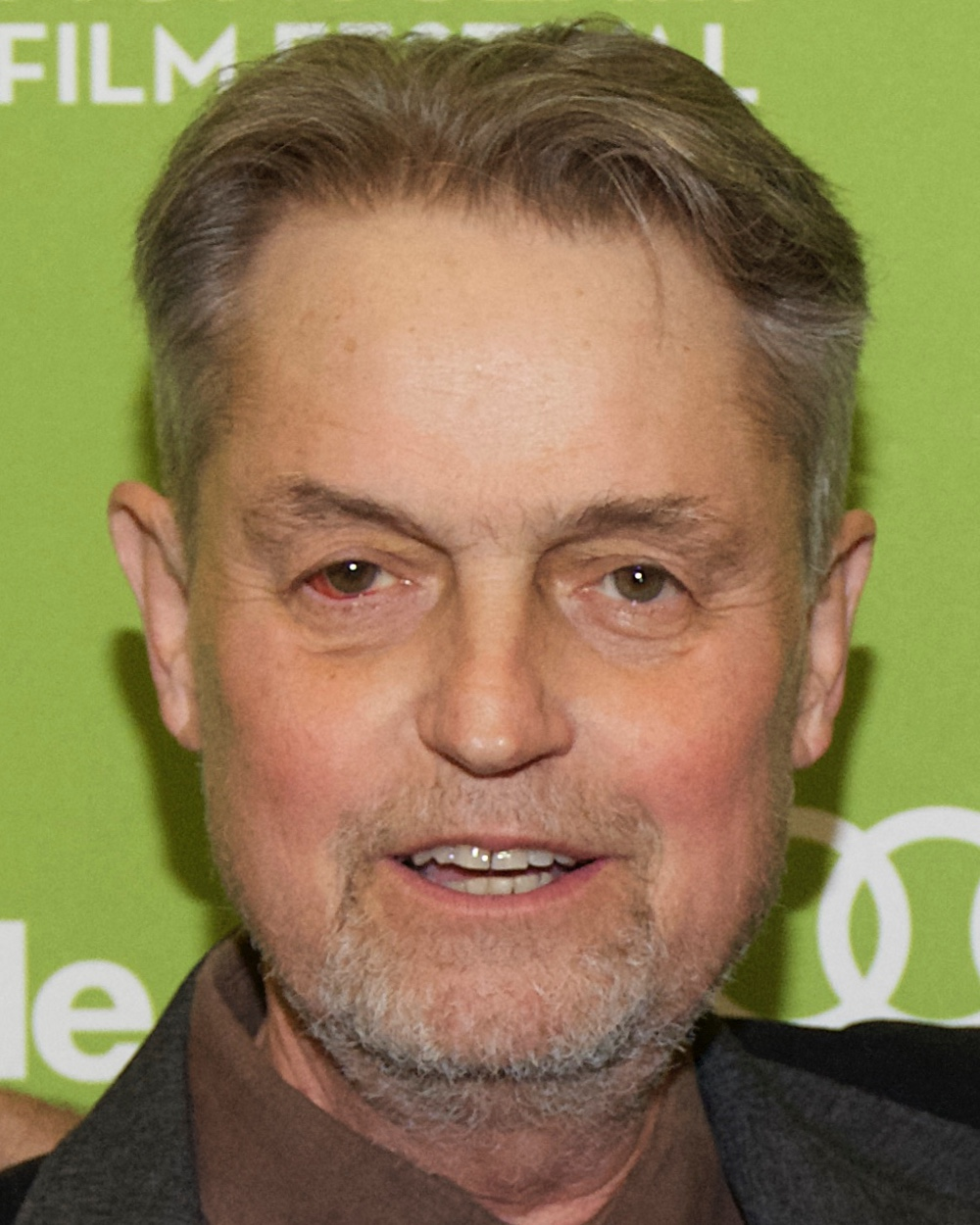
Jonathan Demme won for The Silence of the Lambs (1991).

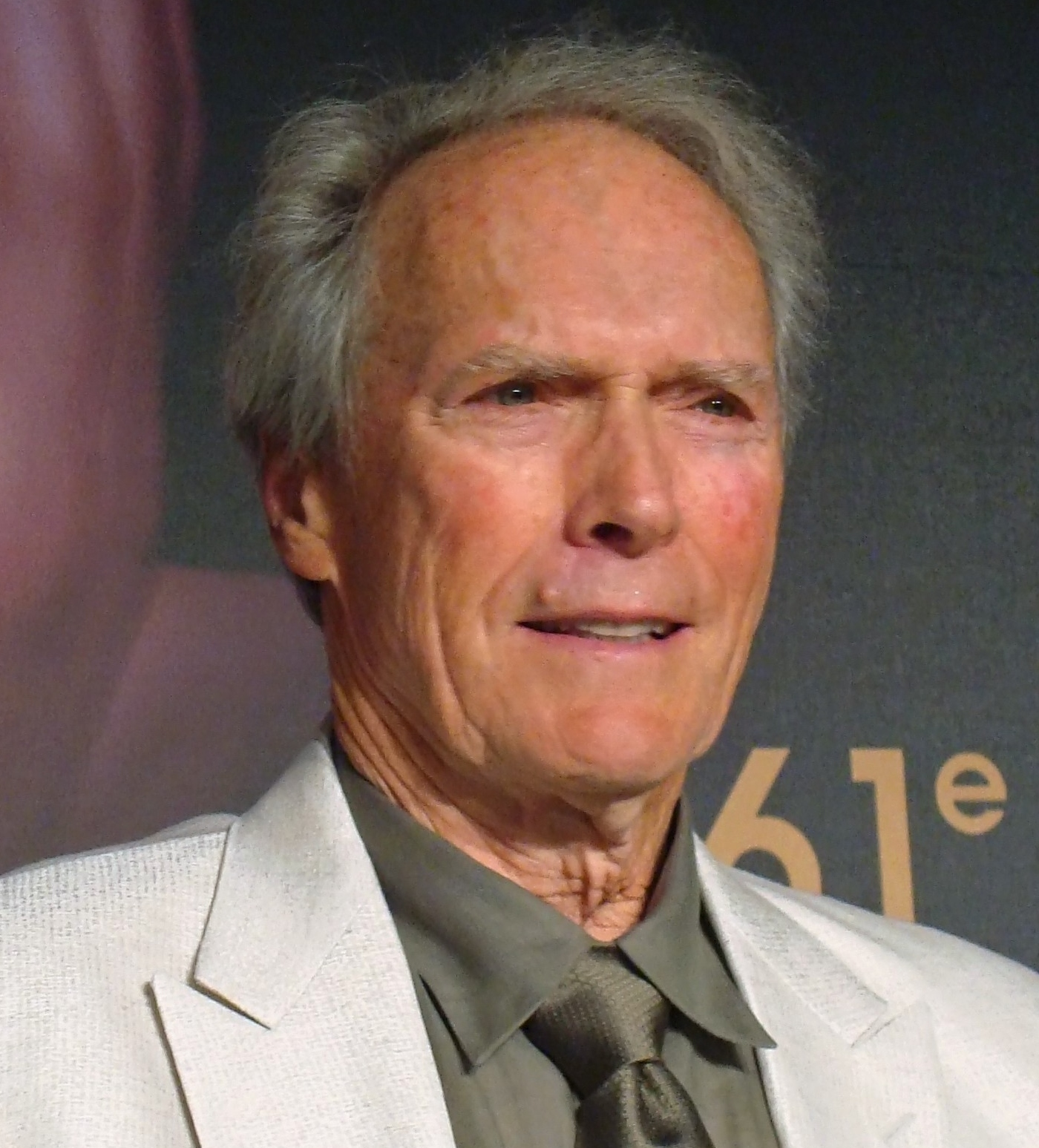
Clint Eastwood won twice, for Unforgiven (1992) & Million Dollar Baby (2004)—latter, at 74, rendered him the oldest winner.

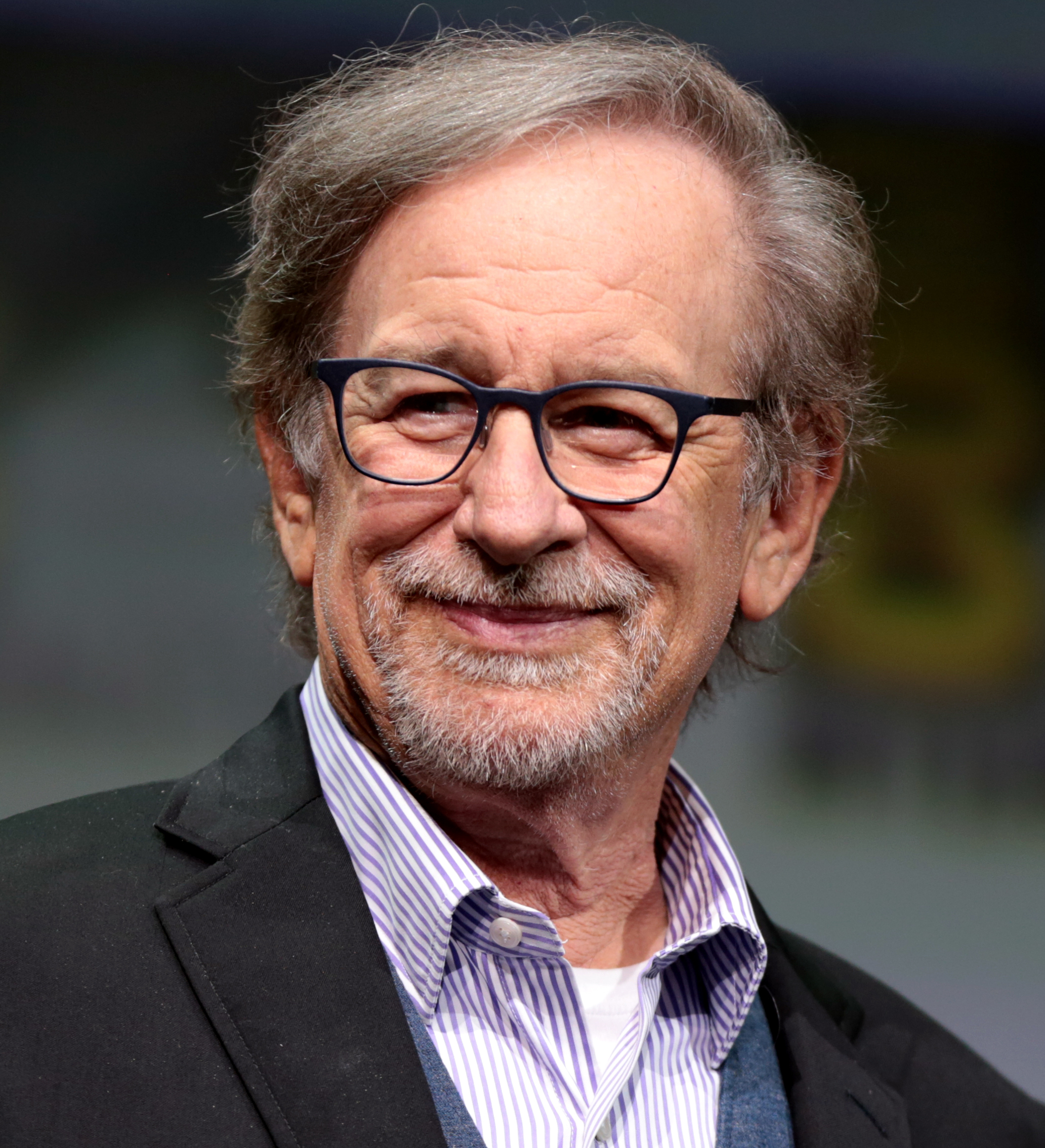
Steven Spielberg won twice, for Schindler's List (1993) & Saving Private Ryan (1998).

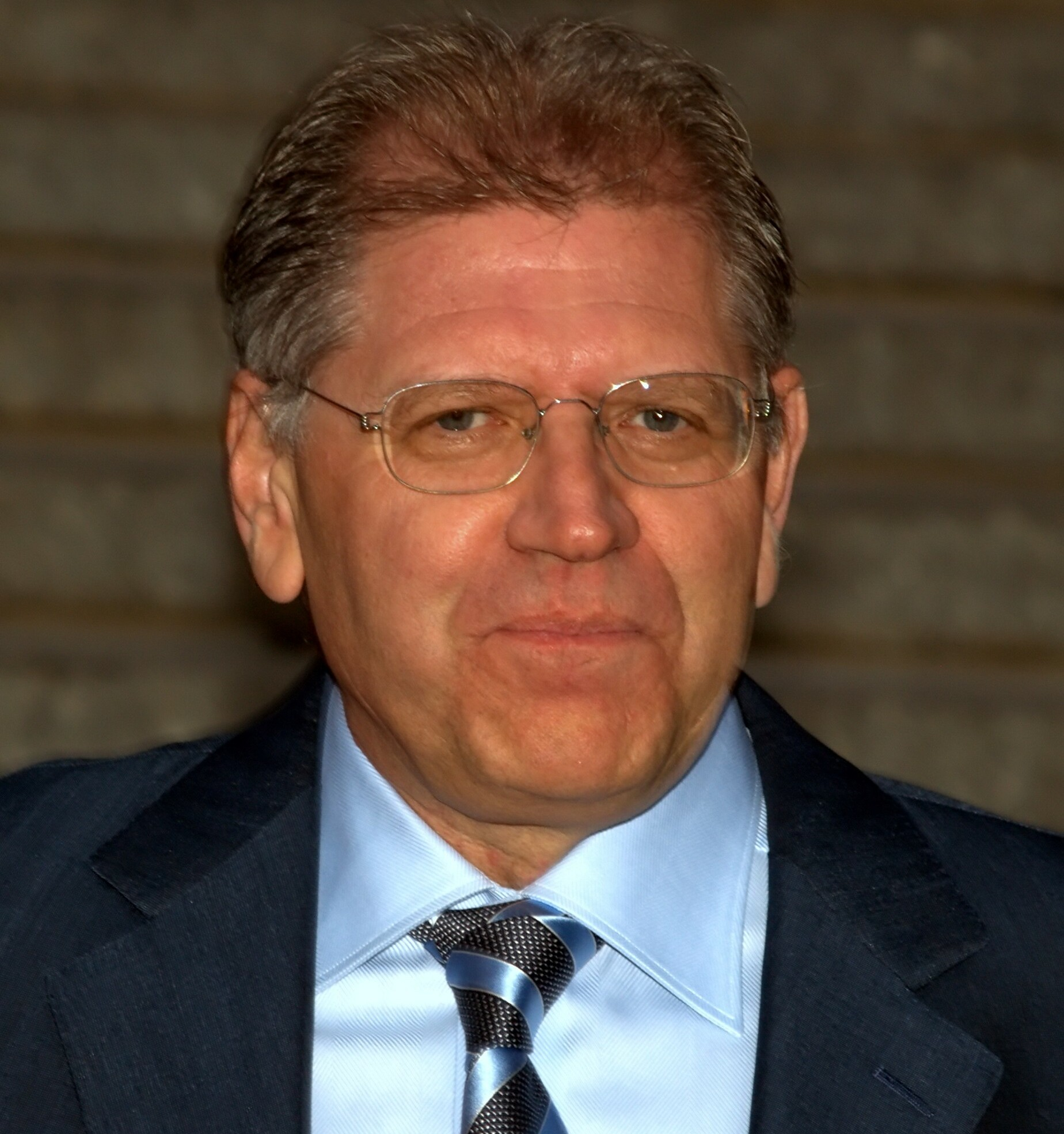
Robert Zemeckis won for Forrest Gump (1994).

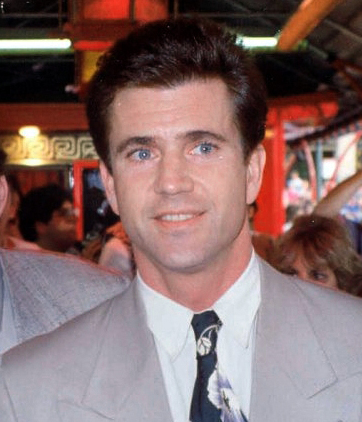
Mel Gibson won for Braveheart (1995).

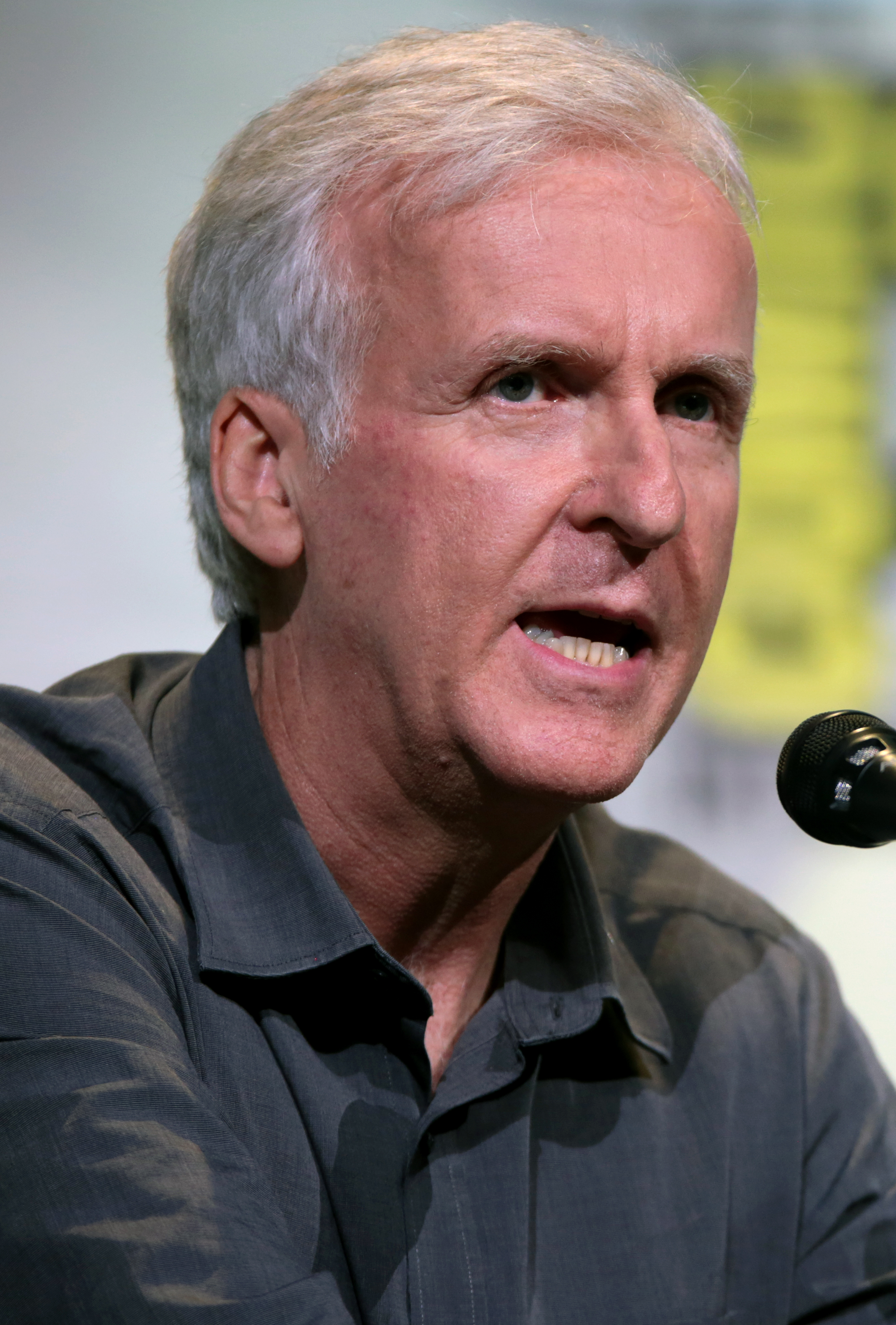
James Cameron won for Titanic (1997).

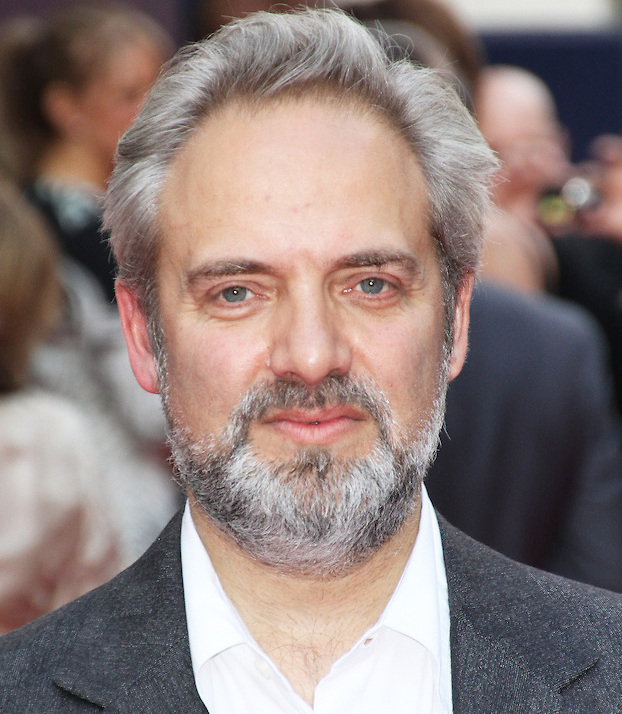
Sam Mendes won for American Beauty (1999).

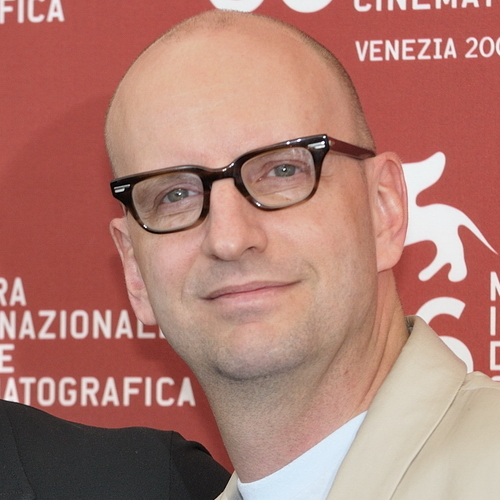
Steven Soderbergh won for Traffic (2000).

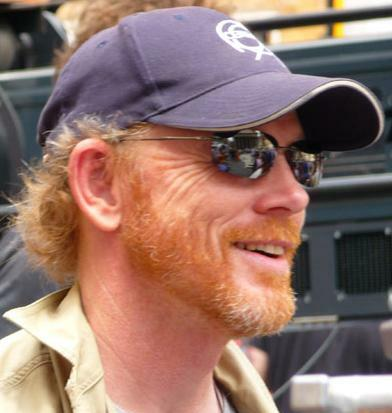
Ron Howard won for A Beautiful Mind (2001).

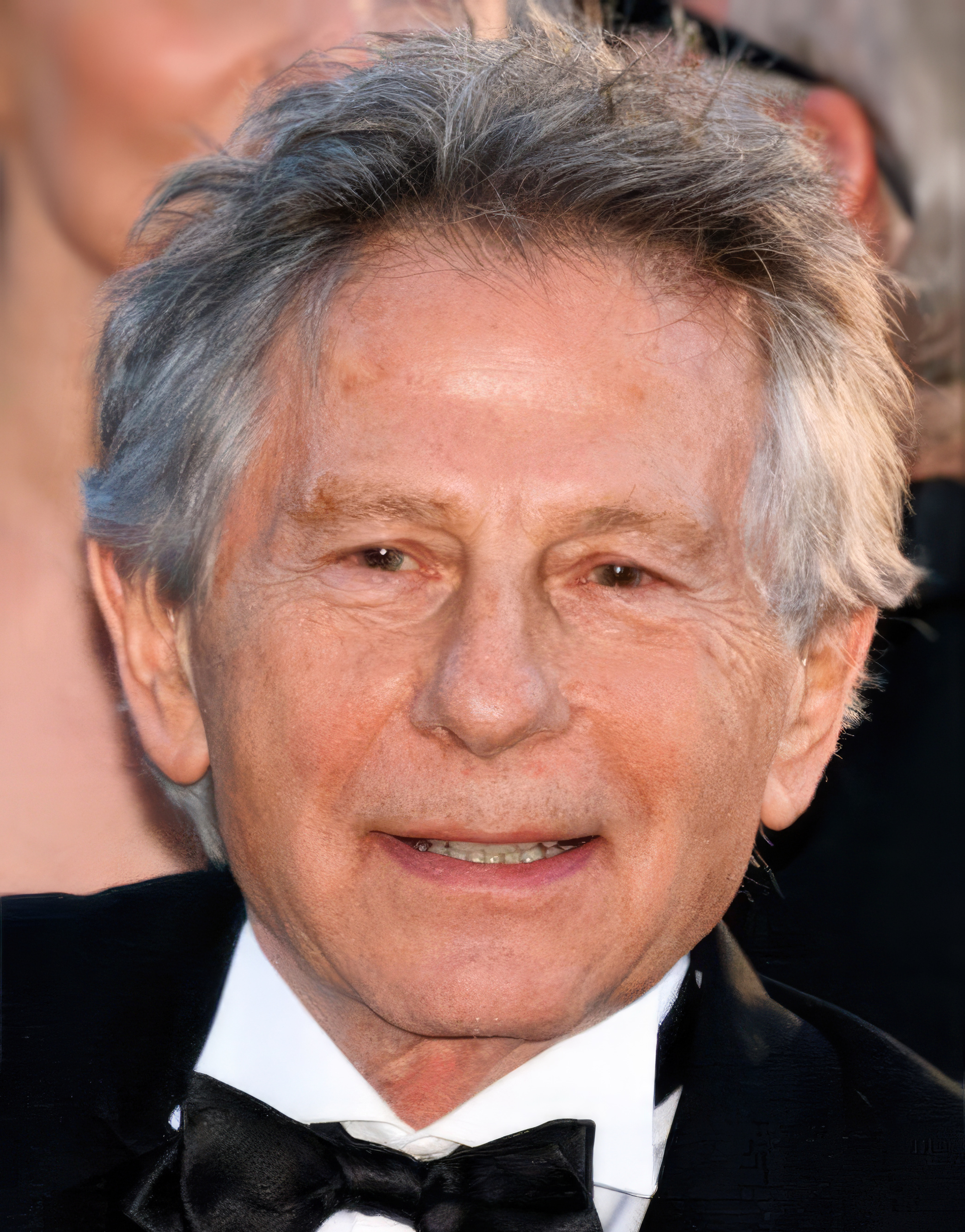
Roman Polanski won for The Pianist (2002).

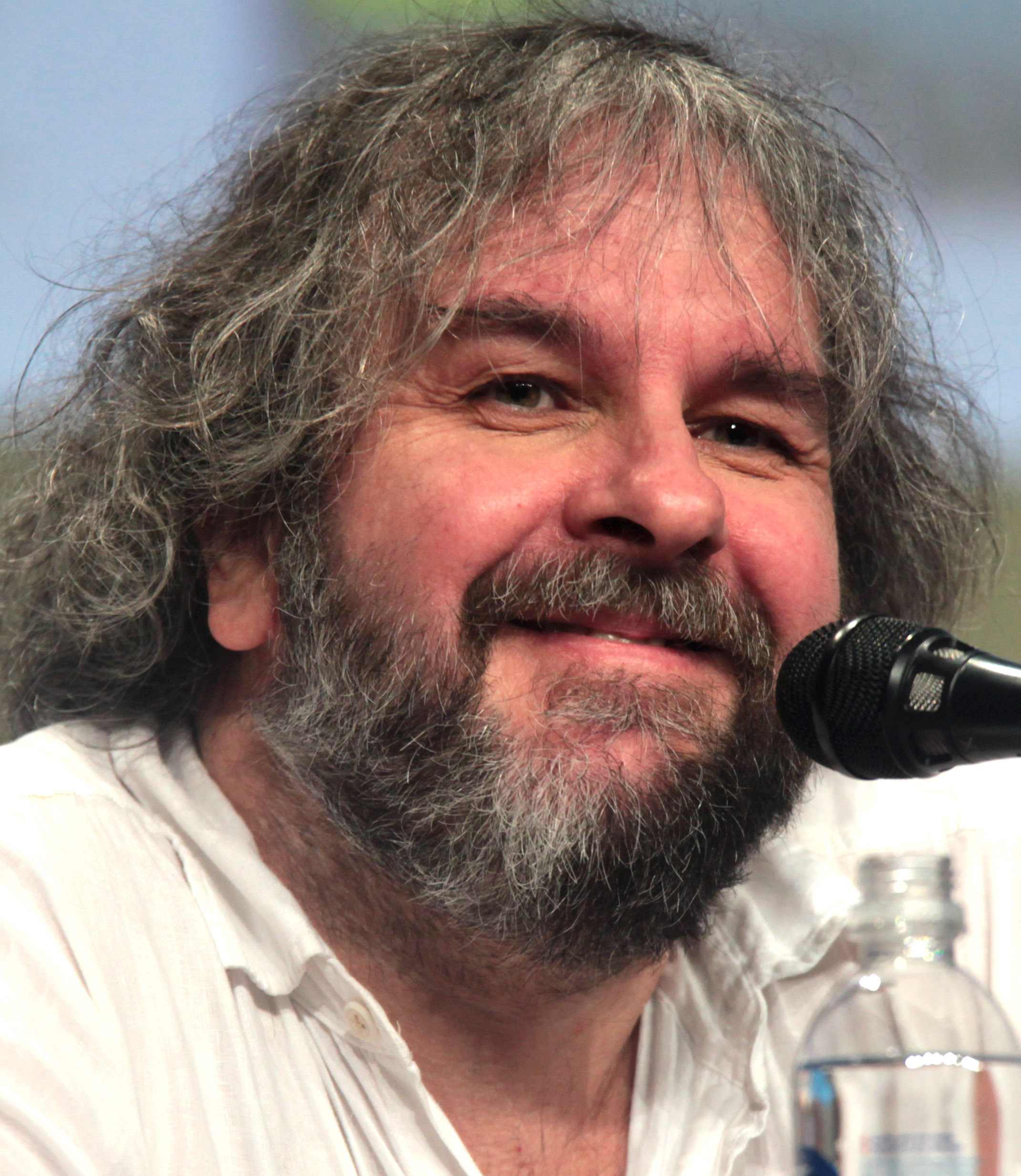
Peter Jackson won for The Lord of the Rings: The Return of the King (2003).

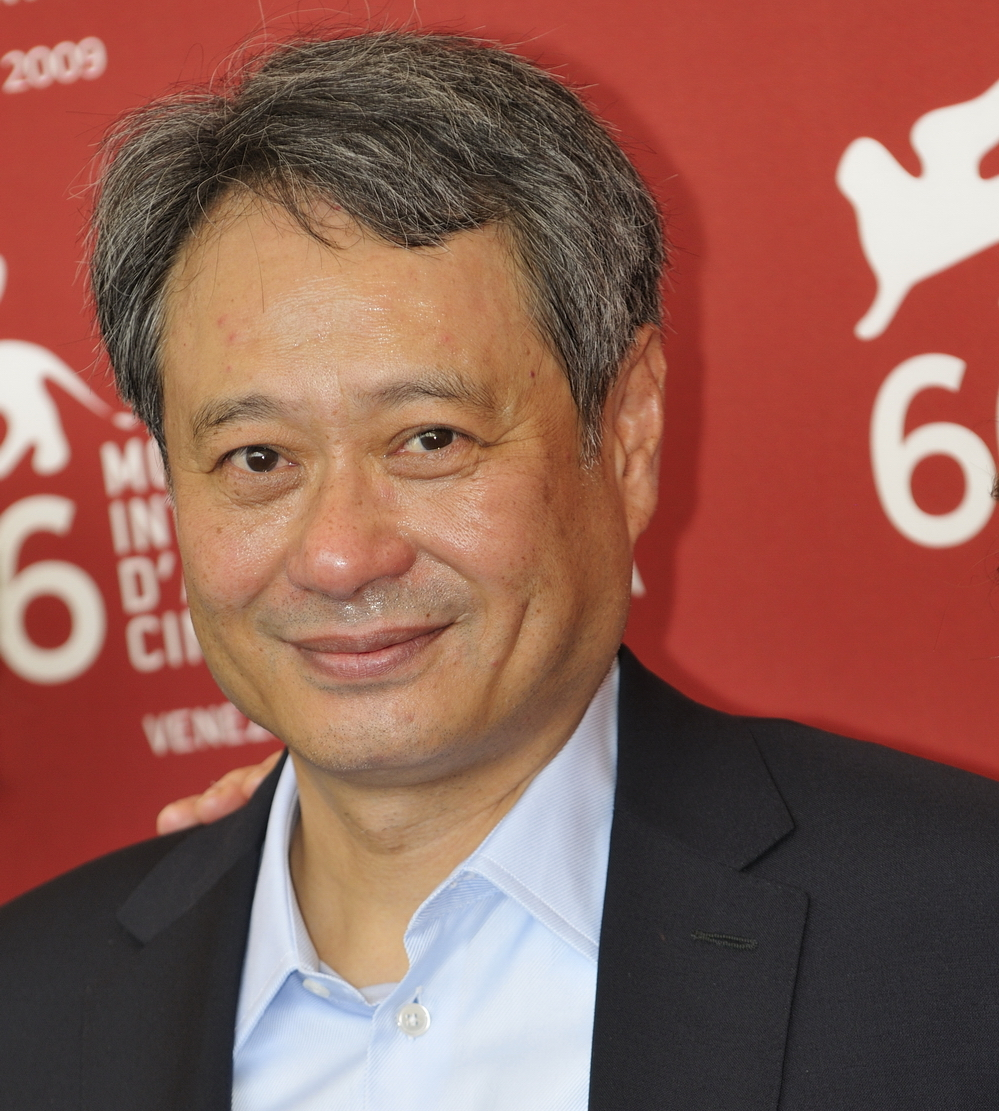
Ang Lee won twice, for Brokeback Mountain (2005) & Life of Pi (2012); first Asian winner.

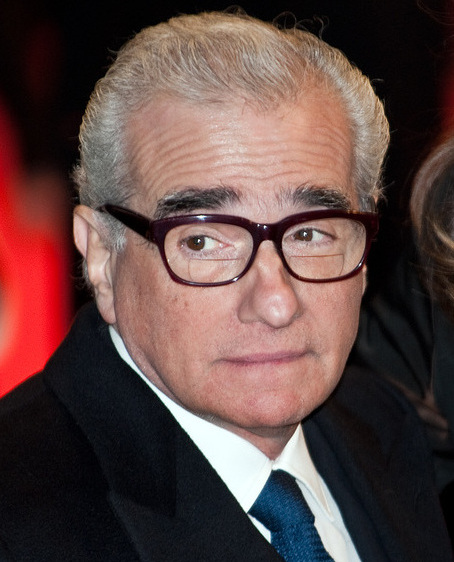
Martin Scorsese won for The Departed (2006).

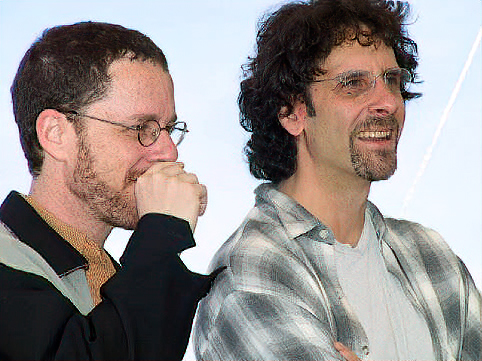
The Coen brothers won for No Country for Old Men (2007).

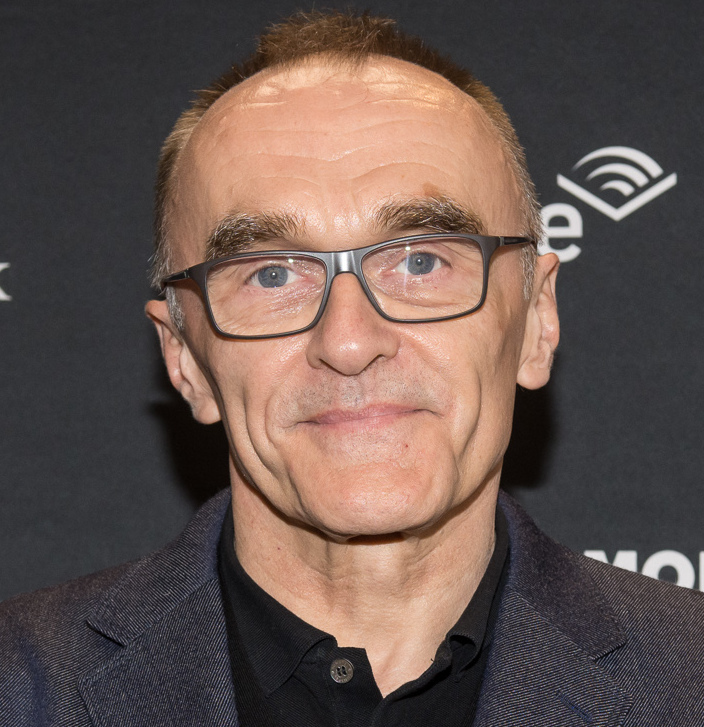
Danny Boyle won for Slumdog Millionaire (2008).

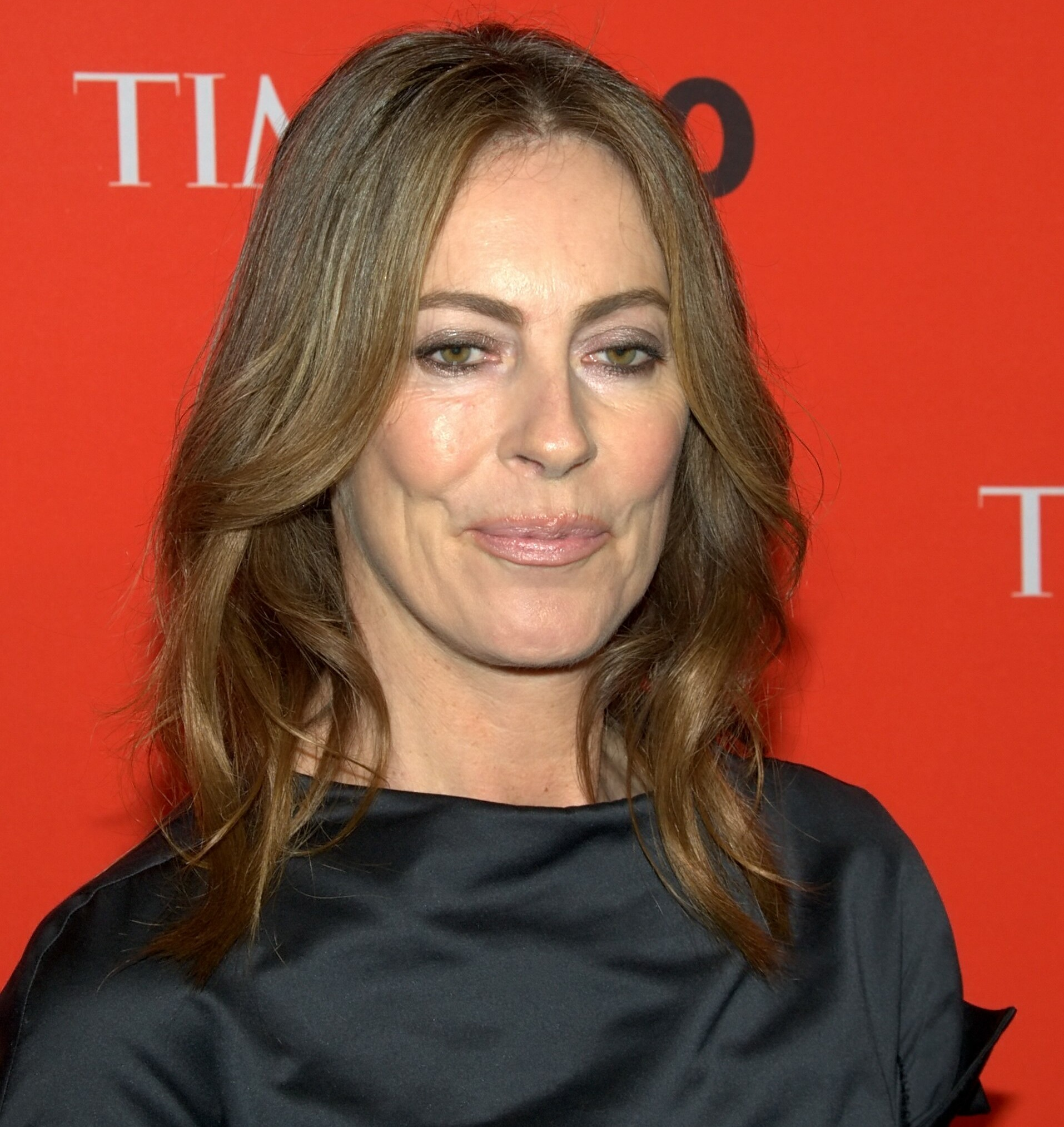
Kathryn Bigelow won for The Hurt Locker (2009); first woman to win.

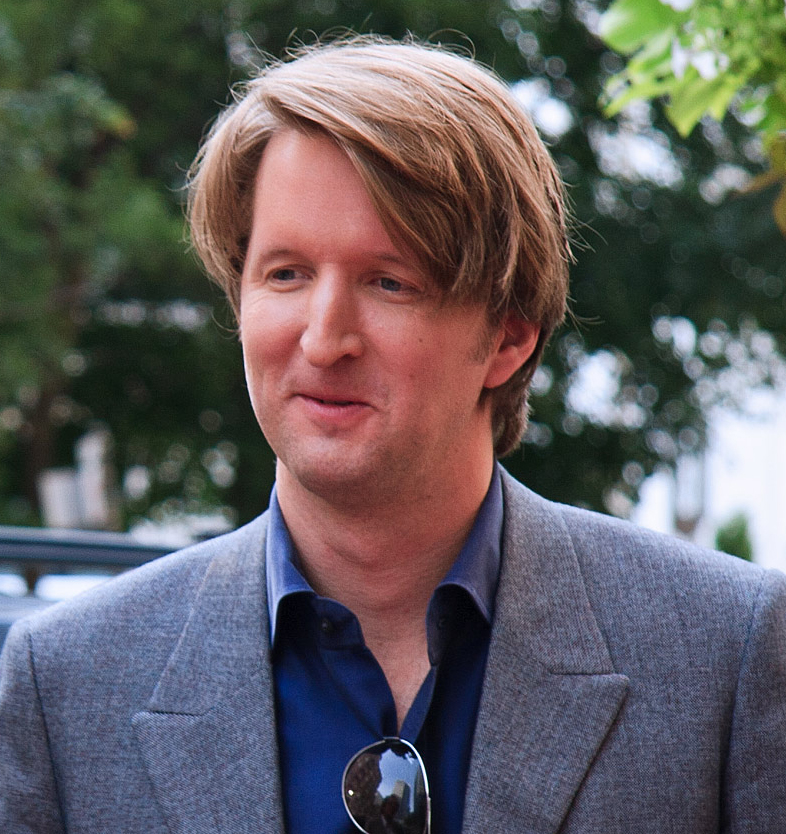
Tom Hooper won for The King's Speech (2010).

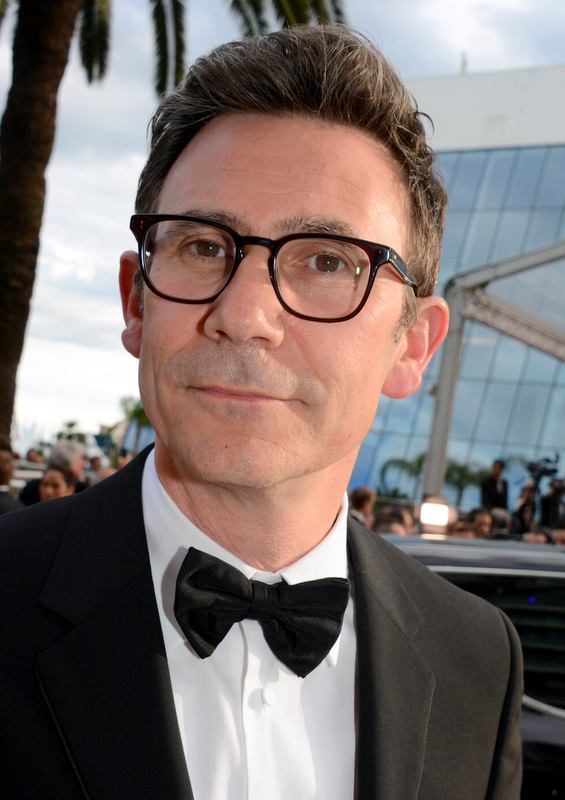
Michel Hazanavicius won for The Artist (2011).

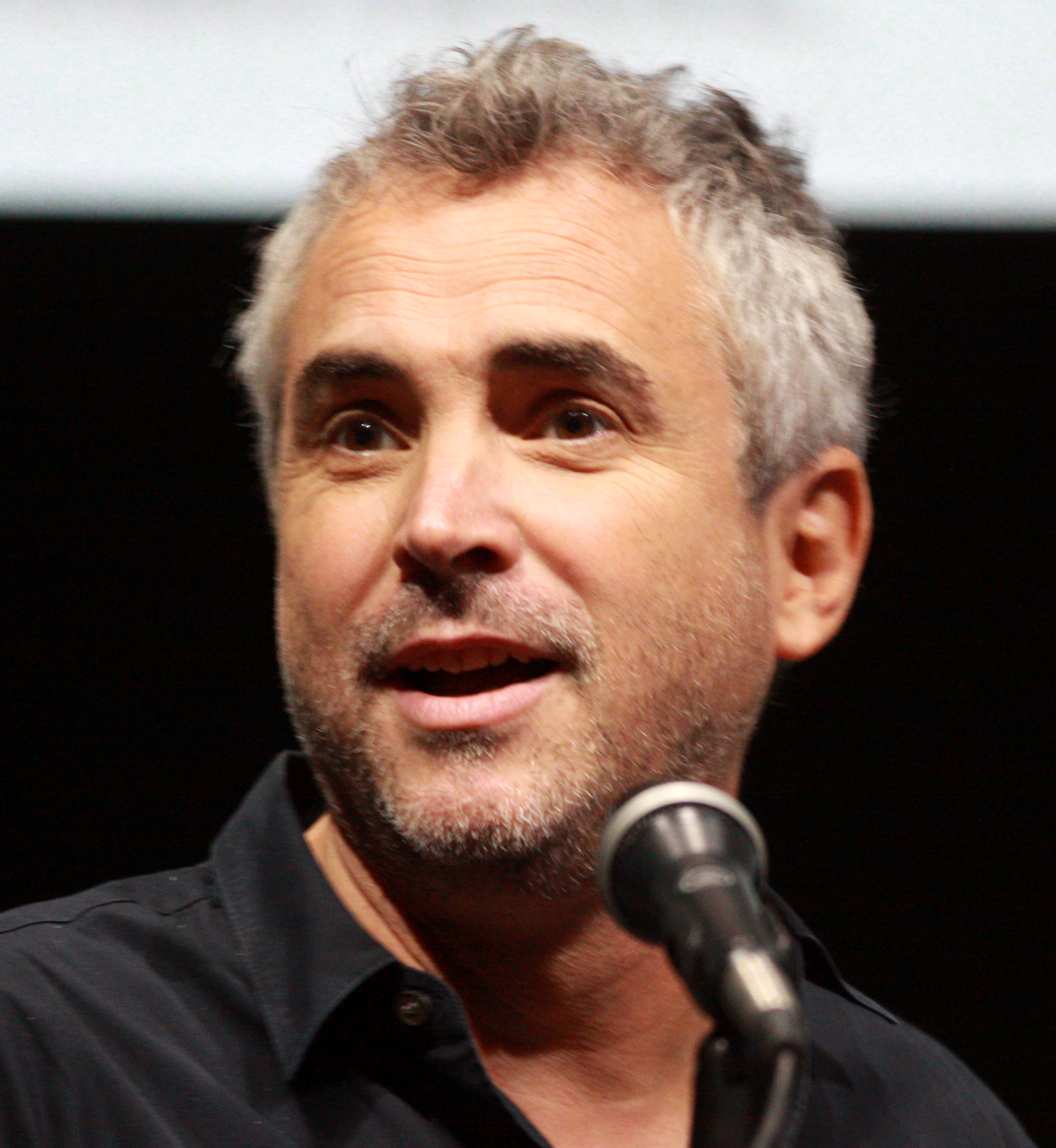
Alfonso Cuarón won twice, for Gravity (2013) & Roma (2018); first Mexican winner.

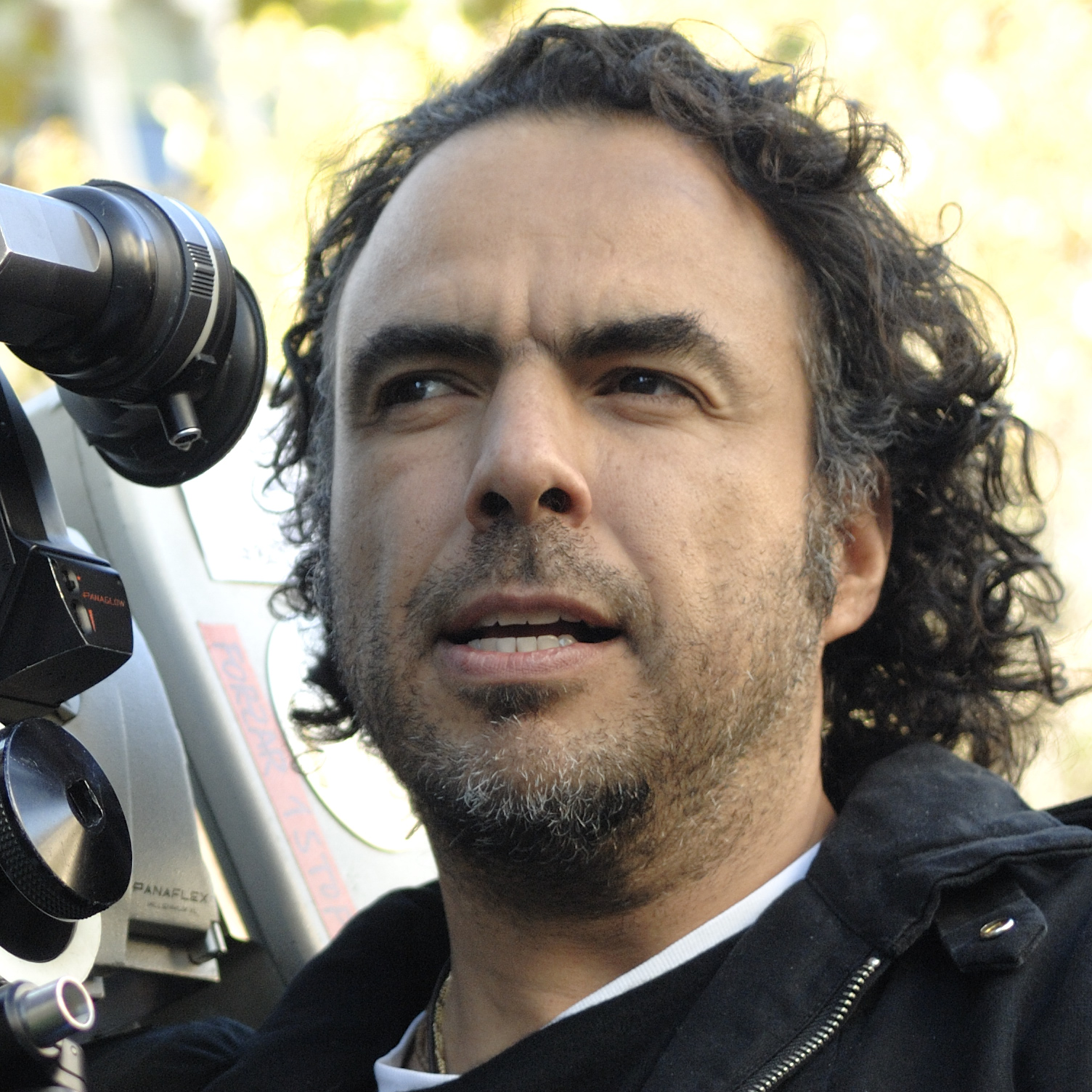
Alejandro G. Iñárritu won twice consecutively, for Birdman (2014) & The Revenant (2015).

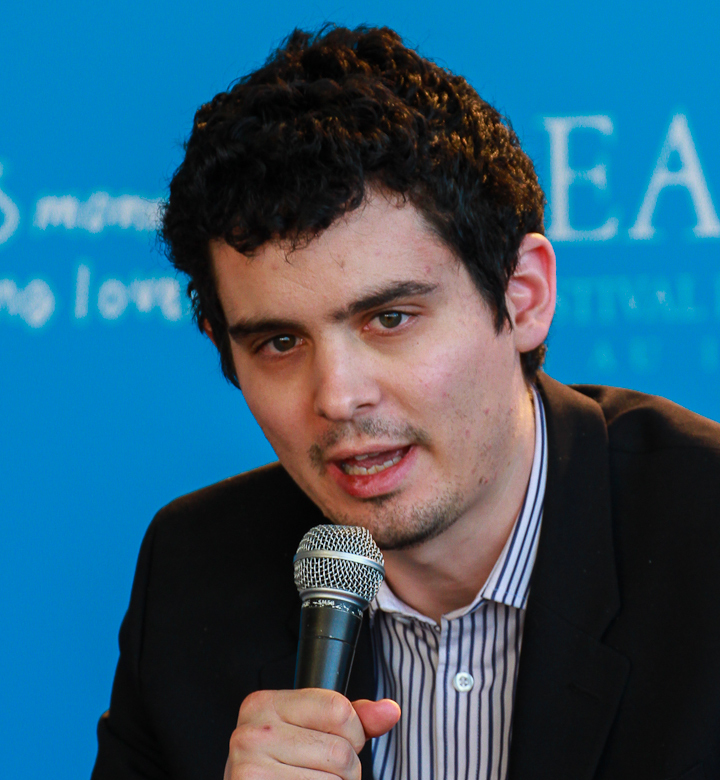
Damien Chazelle won for La La Land (2016); youngest winner, at age 32.

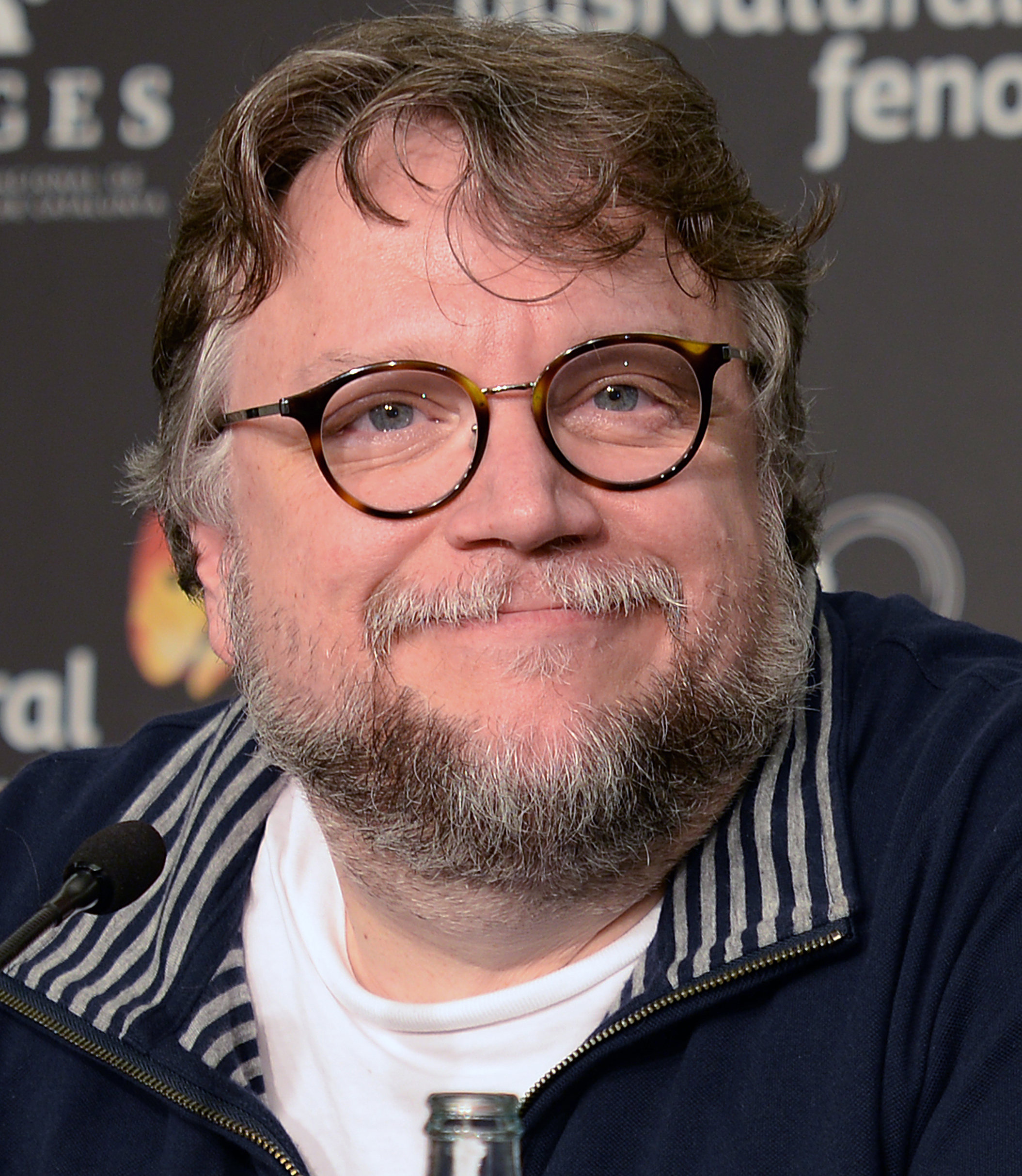
Guillermo del Toro won for The Shape of Water (2017).

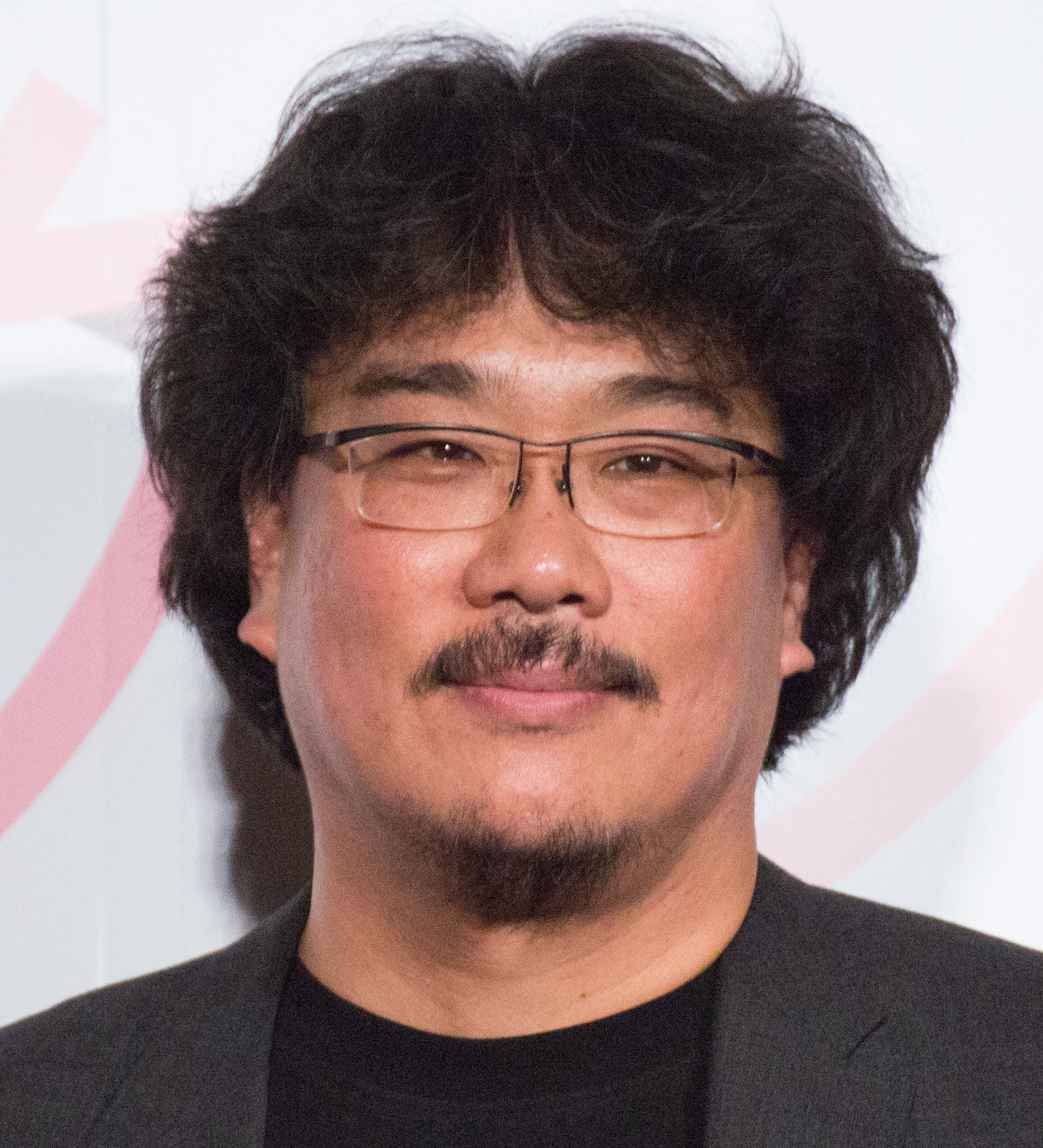
Bong Joon-ho won for Parasite (2019); first to direct a foreign-language (Korean) winner for Best Picture.

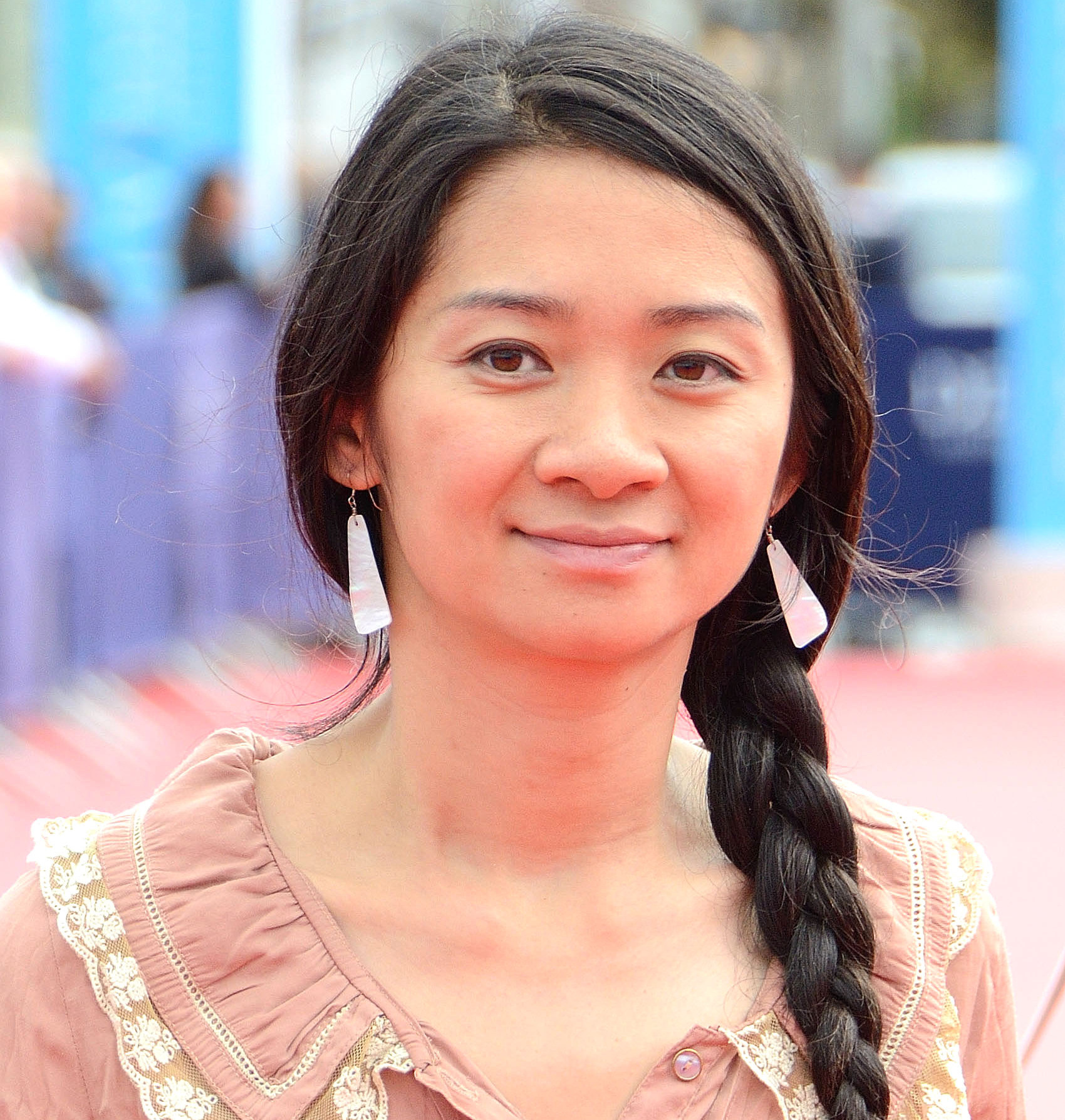
Chloé Zhao won for Nomadland (2020); first woman of color to win.

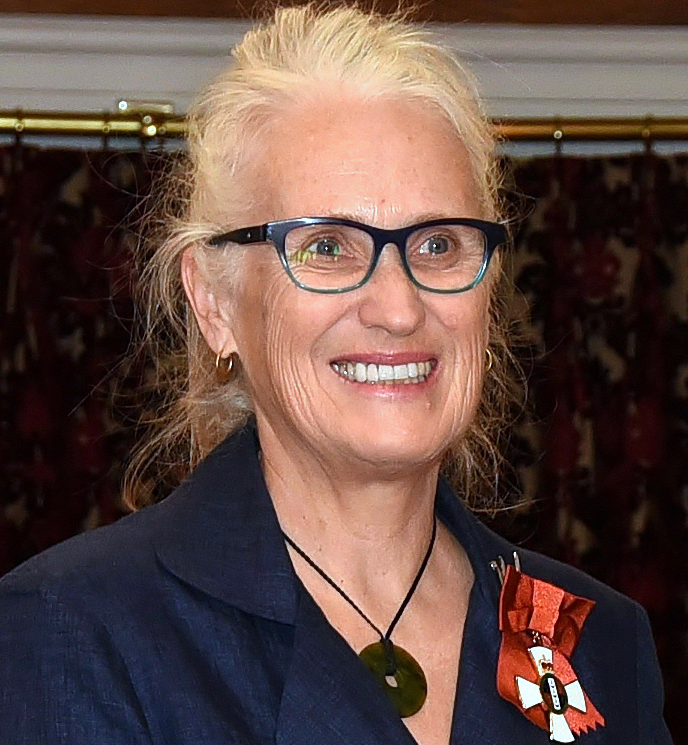
Jane Campion won for The Power of the Dog (2021); first woman to be nominated twice.

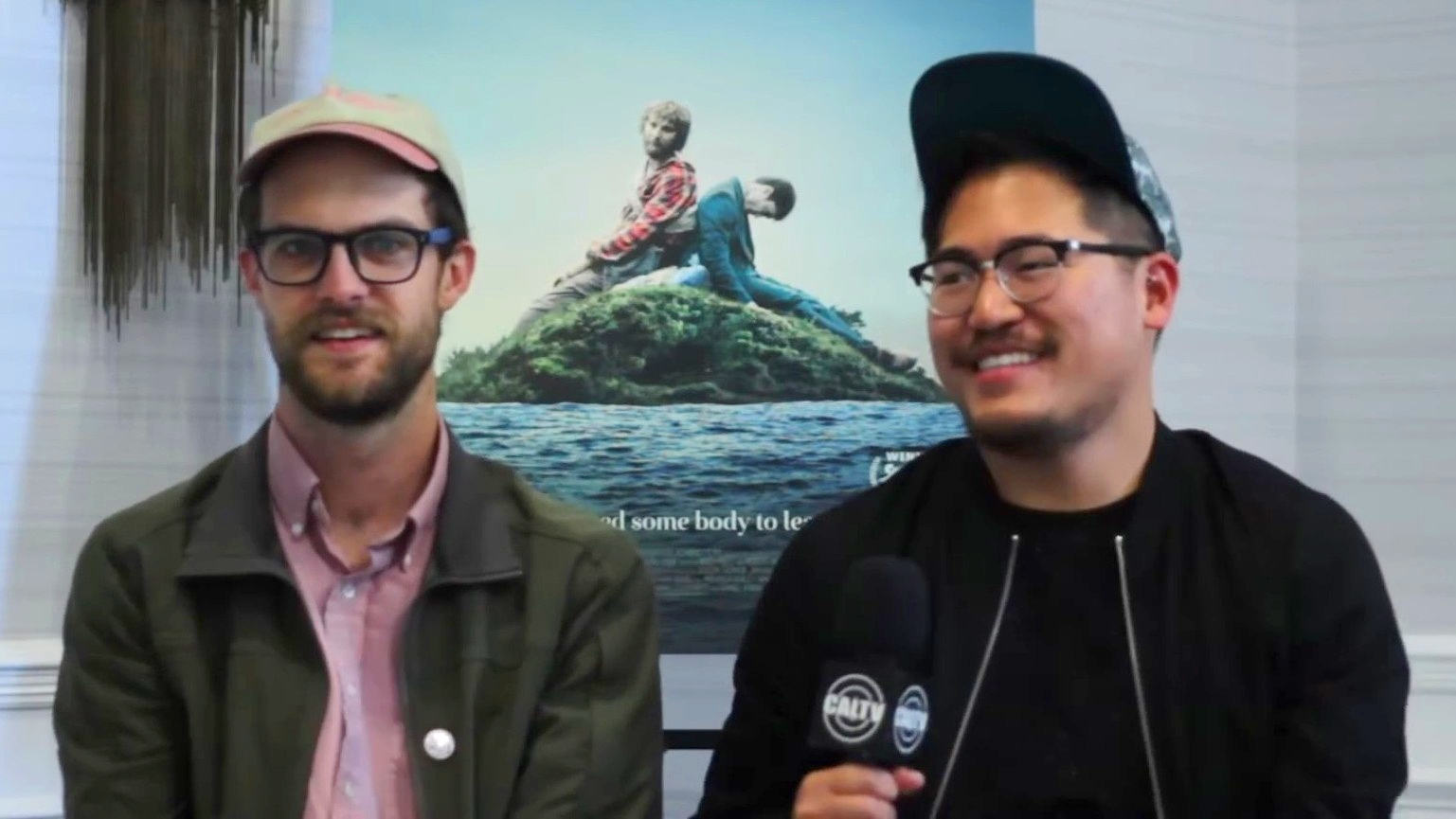
Daniels won for Everything Everywhere All at Once (2022).

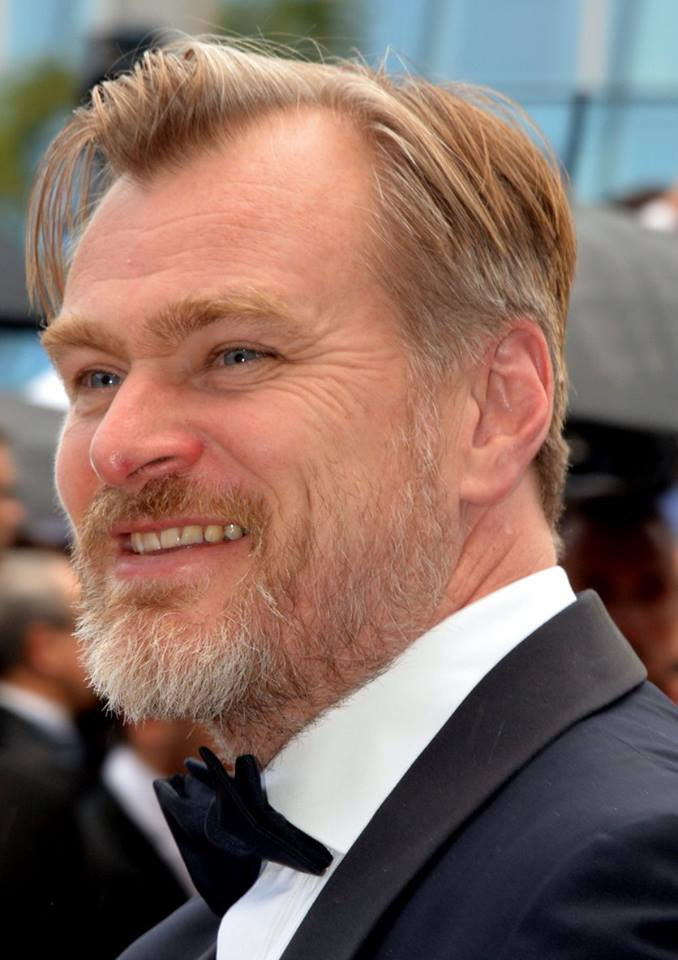
Christopher Nolan won for Oppenheimer (2023).

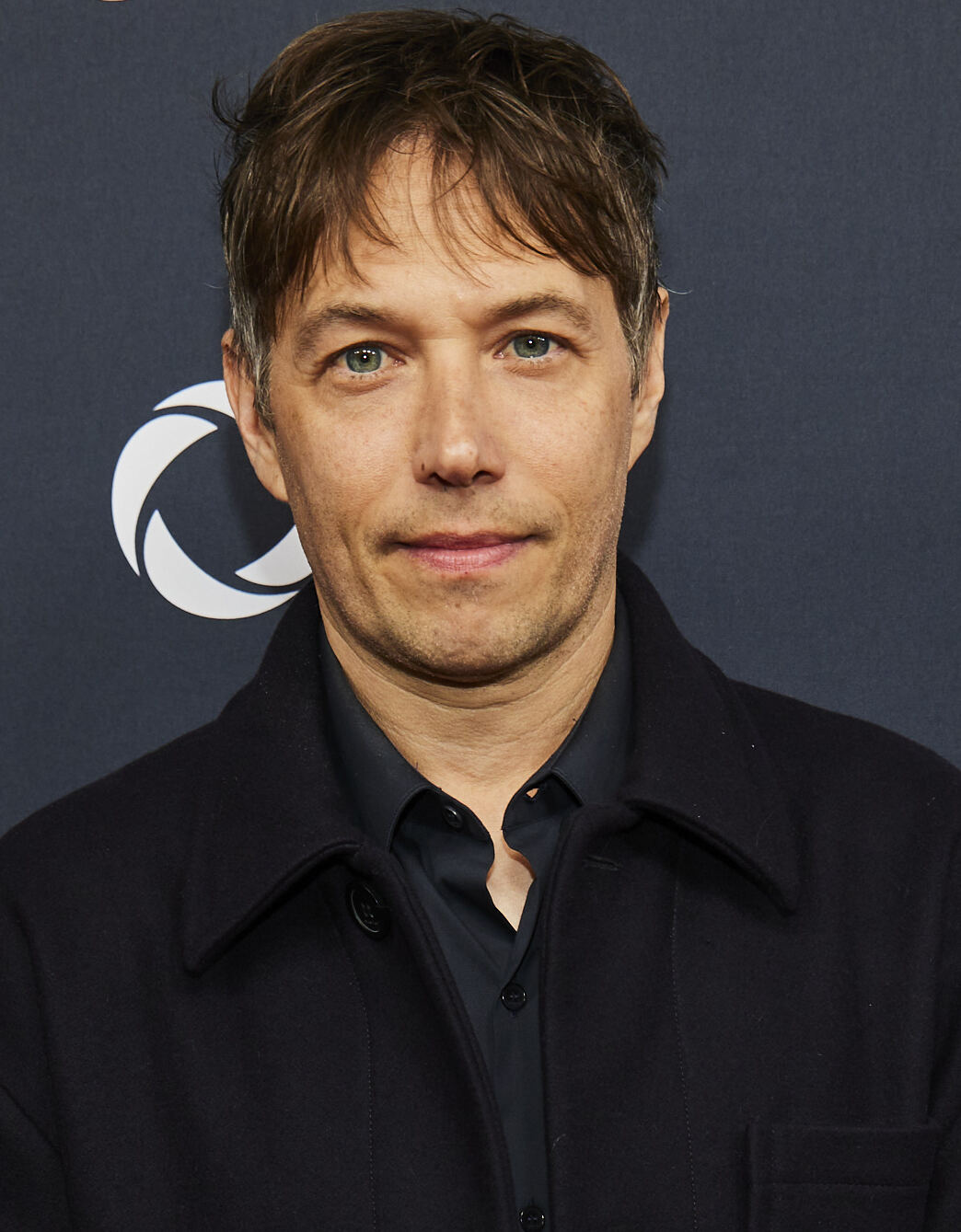
Sean Baker won for Anora (2024).

Table key
Indicates the winner

=== 1920s ===
Year	Director(s)	Film	Ref.
1927/28 (1st)	Frank Borzage (Dramatic Picture)	7th Heaven	
1927/28 (1st)	Herbert Brenon (Dramatic Picture)	Sorrell and Son	
1927/28 (1st)	King Vidor (Dramatic Picture)	The Crowd	
1927/28 (1st)	Lewis Milestone (Comedy Picture)	Two Arabian Knights	
1927/28 (1st)	Ted Wilde (Comedy Picture)	Speedy	
1927/28 (1st)	Charlie Chaplin (Comedy Picture)	The Circus (Note: The Circus originally received a nomination for Best Director (Comedy Picture), as well as nominations for Best Actor and Best Writing (Original Story), all for Charlie Chaplin. However, the Academy subsequently decided to remove Chaplin's name from the competitive award categories and instead to confer upon him a Special Award "for acting, writing, directing and producing The Circus".)	
1928/29 (2nd) (Note: The 2nd Academy Awards is the only ceremony for which there were no official nominees. Subsequent research by AMPAS has resulted in a list of unofficial or de facto nominees, based on records of which films were evaluated by the judges. While Frank Lloyd won for The Divine Lady, his other two nominated films are considered to be a single combined nomination.)	Frank Lloyd	The Divine Lady	
1928/29 (2nd)	Lionel Barrymore	Madame X	
1928/29 (2nd)	Harry Beaumont	The Broadway Melody	
1928/29 (2nd)	Irving Cummings	In Old Arizona	
1928/29 (2nd)	Frank Lloyd	Drag	
1928/29 (2nd)	Frank Lloyd	Weary River	
1928/29 (2nd)	Ernst Lubitsch	The Patriot	

=== 1930s ===
Year	Director(s)	Film	Ref.
1929/30 (3rd)	Lewis Milestone	All Quiet on the Western Front	
1929/30 (3rd)	Clarence Brown (Note: According to the Oscars.org database, Brown's directing nomination counts as one singular, joint, cumulative nomination for two films. This same recognition was applicable to all nominees, such as to Greta Garbo's acting nominations from the same respective films; as well as acting winners, Norma Shearer and George Arliss. No explanation was given for why the latter two were nominated with two films, yet only awarded for one each.)	Anna Christie	
1929/30 (3rd)	Clarence Brown	Romance	
1929/30 (3rd)	Robert Z. Leonard	The Divorcee	
1929/30 (3rd)	Ernst Lubitsch	The Love Parade	
1929/30 (3rd)	King Vidor	Hallelujah!	
1930/31 (4th)	Norman Taurog	Skippy	
1930/31 (4th)	Clarence Brown	A Free Soul	
1930/31 (4th)	Lewis Milestone	The Front Page	
1930/31 (4th)	Wesley Ruggles	Cimarron	
1930/31 (4th)	Josef von Sternberg	Morocco	
1931/32 (5th)	Frank Borzage	Bad Girl	
1931/32 (5th)	King Vidor	The Champ	
1931/32 (5th)	Josef von Sternberg	Shanghai Express	
1932/33 (6th)	Frank Lloyd	Cavalcade	
1932/33 (6th)	Frank Capra	Lady for a Day	
1932/33 (6th)	George Cukor	Little Women	
1934 (7th)	Frank Capra	It Happened One Night	
1934 (7th)	Victor Schertzinger	One Night of Love	
1934 (7th)	W. S. Van Dyke	The Thin Man	
1935 (8th)	John Ford	The Informer	
1935 (8th)	Henry Hathaway	The Lives of a Bengal Lancer	
1935 (8th)	Frank Lloyd	Mutiny on the Bounty	
1935 (8th)	Michael Curtiz (Write-in) (Note: Michael Curtiz was not on the original ballot of nominees. However, after the year prior with Bette Davis's omission for Of Human Bondage, the resulting furor led to a write-in campaign determined to secure her a nomination. Thus, the Academy relaxed their rules and allowed her performance to be amongst the competition. They permitted this once more, prompting further submissions: Curtiz; Paul Muni for Black Fury; and several other categories, including Hal Mohr for A Midsummer Night's Dream. Ultimately, Mohr became the only person to win an Oscar as a result of this process. The Academy discontinued this option from the next ceremony forward to prevent any recurrence.)	Captain Blood	
1936 (9th)	Frank Capra	Mr. Deeds Goes to Town	
1936 (9th)	Gregory La Cava	My Man Godfrey	
1936 (9th)	Robert Z. Leonard	The Great Ziegfeld	
1936 (9th)	W. S. Van Dyke	San Francisco	
1936 (9th)	William Wyler	Dodsworth	
1937 (10th)	Leo McCarey	The Awful Truth	
1937 (10th)	William Dieterle	The Life of Emile Zola	
1937 (10th)	Sidney Franklin	The Good Earth	
1937 (10th)	Gregory La Cava	Stage Door	
1937 (10th)	William A. Wellman	A Star Is Born	
1938 (11th)	Frank Capra	You Can't Take It with You	
1938 (11th)	Michael Curtiz	Angels with Dirty Faces	
1938 (11th)	Michael Curtiz	Four Daughters	
1938 (11th)	Norman Taurog	Boys Town	
1938 (11th)	King Vidor	The Citadel	
1939 (12th)	Victor Fleming	Gone with the Wind	
1939 (12th)	Frank Capra	Mr. Smith Goes to Washington	
1939 (12th)	John Ford	Stagecoach	
1939 (12th)	Sam Wood	Goodbye, Mr. Chips	
1939 (12th)	William Wyler	Wuthering Heights	

=== 1940s ===
Year	Director(s)	Film	Ref.
1940 (13th)	John Ford	The Grapes of Wrath	
1940 (13th)	George Cukor	The Philadelphia Story	
1940 (13th)	Alfred Hitchcock	Rebecca	
1940 (13th)	Sam Wood	Kitty Foyle	
1940 (13th)	William Wyler	The Letter	
1941 (14th)	John Ford	How Green Was My Valley	
1941 (14th)	Alexander Hall	Here Comes Mr. Jordan	
1941 (14th)	Howard Hawks	Sergeant York	
1941 (14th)	Orson Welles	Citizen Kane	
1941 (14th)	William Wyler	The Little Foxes	
1942 (15th)	William Wyler	Mrs. Miniver	
1942 (15th)	Michael Curtiz	Yankee Doodle Dandy	
1942 (15th)	John Farrow	Wake Island	
1942 (15th)	Mervyn LeRoy	Random Harvest	
1942 (15th)	Sam Wood	Kings Row	
1943 (16th)	Michael Curtiz	Casablanca	
1943 (16th)	Clarence Brown	The Human Comedy	
1943 (16th)	Henry King	The Song of Bernadette	
1943 (16th)	Ernst Lubitsch	Heaven Can Wait	
1943 (16th)	George Stevens	The More the Merrier	
1944 (17th)	Leo McCarey	Going My Way	
1944 (17th)	Alfred Hitchcock	Lifeboat	
1944 (17th)	Henry King	Wilson	
1944 (17th)	Otto Preminger	Laura	
1944 (17th)	Billy Wilder	Double Indemnity	
1945 (18th)	Billy Wilder	The Lost Weekend	
1945 (18th)	Clarence Brown	National Velvet	
1945 (18th)	Alfred Hitchcock	Spellbound	
1945 (18th)	Leo McCarey	The Bells of St. Mary's	
1945 (18th)	Jean Renoir	The Southerner	
1946 (19th)	William Wyler	The Best Years of Our Lives	
1946 (19th)	Clarence Brown	The Yearling	
1946 (19th)	Frank Capra	It's a Wonderful Life	
1946 (19th)	David Lean	Brief Encounter	
1946 (19th)	Robert Siodmak	The Killers	
1947 (20th)	Elia Kazan	Gentleman's Agreement	
1947 (20th)	George Cukor	A Double Life	
1947 (20th)	Edward Dmytryk	Crossfire	
1947 (20th)	Henry Koster	The Bishop's Wife	
1947 (20th)	David Lean	Great Expectations	
1948 (21st)	John Huston	The Treasure of the Sierra Madre	
1948 (21st)	Anatole Litvak	The Snake Pit	
1948 (21st)	Jean Negulesco	Johnny Belinda	
1948 (21st)	Laurence Olivier	Hamlet	
1948 (21st)	Fred Zinnemann	The Search	
1949 (22nd)	Joseph L. Mankiewicz	A Letter to Three Wives	
1949 (22nd)	Carol Reed	The Fallen Idol	
1949 (22nd)	Robert Rossen	All the King's Men	
1949 (22nd)	William A. Wellman	Battleground	
1949 (22nd)	William Wyler	The Heiress	

=== 1950s ===
Year	Director(s)	Film	Ref.
1950 (23rd)	Joseph L. Mankiewicz	All About Eve	
1950 (23rd)	George Cukor	Born Yesterday	
1950 (23rd)	John Huston	The Asphalt Jungle	
1950 (23rd)	Carol Reed	The Third Man	
1950 (23rd)	Billy Wilder	Sunset Boulevard	
1951 (24th)	George Stevens	A Place in the Sun	
1951 (24th)	John Huston	The African Queen	
1951 (24th)	Elia Kazan	A Streetcar Named Desire	
1951 (24th)	Vincente Minnelli	An American in Paris	
1951 (24th)	William Wyler	Detective Story	
1952 (25th)	John Ford	The Quiet Man	
1952 (25th)	Cecil B. DeMille	The Greatest Show on Earth	
1952 (25th)	John Huston	Moulin Rouge	
1952 (25th)	Joseph L. Mankiewicz	5 Fingers	
1952 (25th)	Fred Zinnemann	High Noon	
1953 (26th)	Fred Zinnemann	From Here to Eternity	
1953 (26th)	George Stevens	Shane	
1953 (26th)	Charles Walters	Lili	
1953 (26th)	Billy Wilder	Stalag 17	
1953 (26th)	William Wyler	Roman Holiday	
1954 (27th)	Elia Kazan	On the Waterfront	
1954 (27th)	Alfred Hitchcock	Rear Window	
1954 (27th)	George Seaton	The Country Girl	
1954 (27th)	William A. Wellman	The High and the Mighty	
1954 (27th)	Billy Wilder	Sabrina	
1955 (28th)	Delbert Mann	Marty	
1955 (28th)	Elia Kazan	East of Eden	
1955 (28th)	David Lean	Summertime	
1955 (28th)	Joshua Logan	Picnic	
1955 (28th)	John Sturges	Bad Day at Black Rock	
1956 (29th)	George Stevens	Giant	
1956 (29th)	Michael Anderson	Around the World in 80 Days	
1956 (29th)	Walter Lang	The King and I	
1956 (29th)	King Vidor	War and Peace	
1956 (29th)	William Wyler	Friendly Persuasion	
1957 (30th)	David Lean	The Bridge on the River Kwai	
1957 (30th)	Joshua Logan	Sayonara	
1957 (30th)	Sidney Lumet	12 Angry Men	
1957 (30th)	Mark Robson	Peyton Place	
1957 (30th)	Billy Wilder	Witness for the Prosecution	
1958 (31st)	Vincente Minnelli	Gigi	
1958 (31st)	Richard Brooks	Cat on a Hot Tin Roof	
1958 (31st)	Stanley Kramer	The Defiant Ones	
1958 (31st)	Mark Robson	The Inn of the Sixth Happiness	
1958 (31st)	Robert Wise	I Want to Live!	
1959 (32nd)	William Wyler	Ben-Hur	
1959 (32nd)	Jack Clayton	Room at the Top	
1959 (32nd)	George Stevens	The Diary of Anne Frank	
1959 (32nd)	Billy Wilder	Some Like It Hot	
1959 (32nd)	Fred Zinnemann	The Nun's Story	

=== 1960s ===
Year	Director(s)	Film	Ref.
1960 (33rd)	Billy Wilder	The Apartment	
1960 (33rd)	Jack Cardiff	Sons and Lovers	
1960 (33rd)	Jules Dassin	Never on Sunday	
1960 (33rd)	Alfred Hitchcock	Psycho	
1960 (33rd)	Fred Zinnemann	The Sundowners	
1961 (34th)	Robert Wise & Jerome Robbins	West Side Story	
1961 (34th)	Federico Fellini	La Dolce Vita	
1961 (34th)	Stanley Kramer	Judgment at Nuremberg	
1961 (34th)	Robert Rossen	The Hustler	
1961 (34th)	J. Lee Thompson	The Guns of Navarone	
1962 (35th)	David Lean	Lawrence of Arabia	
1962 (35th)	Pietro Germi	Divorce Italian Style	
1962 (35th)	Robert Mulligan	To Kill a Mockingbird	
1962 (35th)	Arthur Penn	The Miracle Worker	
1962 (35th)	Frank Perry	David and Lisa	
1963 (36th)	Tony Richardson	Tom Jones	
1963 (36th)	Federico Fellini	8½	
1963 (36th)	Elia Kazan	America America	
1963 (36th)	Otto Preminger	The Cardinal	
1963 (36th)	Martin Ritt	Hud	
1964 (37th)	George Cukor	My Fair Lady	
1964 (37th)	Michael Cacoyannis	Zorba the Greek	
1964 (37th)	Peter Glenville	Becket	
1964 (37th)	Stanley Kubrick	Dr. Strangelove	
1964 (37th)	Robert Stevenson	Mary Poppins	
1965 (38th)	Robert Wise	The Sound of Music	
1965 (38th)	David Lean	Doctor Zhivago	
1965 (38th)	John Schlesinger	Darling	
1965 (38th)	Hiroshi Teshigahara	Woman in the Dunes	
1965 (38th)	William Wyler	The Collector	
1966 (39th)	Fred Zinnemann	A Man for All Seasons	
1966 (39th)	Michelangelo Antonioni	Blowup	
1966 (39th)	Richard Brooks	The Professionals	
1966 (39th)	Claude Lelouch	A Man and a Woman	
1966 (39th)	Mike Nichols	Who's Afraid of Virginia Woolf?	
1967 (40th)	Mike Nichols	The Graduate	
1967 (40th)	Richard Brooks	In Cold Blood	
1967 (40th)	Norman Jewison	In the Heat of the Night	
1967 (40th)	Stanley Kramer	Guess Who's Coming to Dinner	
1967 (40th)	Arthur Penn	Bonnie and Clyde	
1968 (41st)	Carol Reed	Oliver!	
1968 (41st)	Anthony Harvey	The Lion in Winter	
1968 (41st)	Stanley Kubrick	2001: A Space Odyssey	
1968 (41st)	Gillo Pontecorvo	The Battle of Algiers	
1968 (41st)	Franco Zeffirelli	Romeo and Juliet	
1969 (42nd)	John Schlesinger	Midnight Cowboy	
1969 (42nd)	Costa-Gavras	Z	
1969 (42nd)	George Roy Hill	Butch Cassidy and the Sundance Kid	
1969 (42nd)	Arthur Penn	Alice's Restaurant	
1969 (42nd)	Sydney Pollack	They Shoot Horses, Don't They?	

=== 1970s ===
Year	Director(s)	Film	Ref.
1970 (43rd)	Franklin J. Schaffner	Patton	
1970 (43rd)	Robert Altman	M*A*S*H	
1970 (43rd)	Federico Fellini	Fellini Satyricon	
1970 (43rd)	Arthur Hiller	Love Story	
1970 (43rd)	Ken Russell	Women in Love	
1971 (44th)	William Friedkin	The French Connection	
1971 (44th)	Peter Bogdanovich	The Last Picture Show	
1971 (44th)	Norman Jewison	Fiddler on the Roof	
1971 (44th)	Stanley Kubrick	A Clockwork Orange	
1971 (44th)	John Schlesinger	Sunday Bloody Sunday	
1972 (45th)	Bob Fosse	Cabaret	
1972 (45th)	John Boorman	Deliverance	
1972 (45th)	Francis Ford Coppola	The Godfather	
1972 (45th)	Joseph L. Mankiewicz	Sleuth	
1972 (45th)	Jan Troell	The Emigrants	
1973 (46th)	George Roy Hill	The Sting	
1973 (46th)	Ingmar Bergman	Cries and Whispers	
1973 (46th)	Bernardo Bertolucci	Last Tango in Paris	
1973 (46th)	William Friedkin	The Exorcist	
1973 (46th)	George Lucas	American Graffiti	
1974 (47th)	Francis Ford Coppola	The Godfather Part II	
1974 (47th)	John Cassavetes	A Woman Under the Influence	
1974 (47th)	Bob Fosse	Lenny	
1974 (47th)	Roman Polanski	Chinatown	
1974 (47th)	François Truffaut	Day for Night	
1975 (48th)	Miloš Forman	One Flew Over the Cuckoo's Nest	
1975 (48th)	Robert Altman	Nashville	
1975 (48th)	Federico Fellini	Amarcord	
1975 (48th)	Stanley Kubrick	Barry Lyndon	
1975 (48th)	Sidney Lumet	Dog Day Afternoon	
1976 (49th)	John G. Avildsen	Rocky	
1976 (49th)	Ingmar Bergman	Face to Face	
1976 (49th)	Sidney Lumet	Network	
1976 (49th)	Alan J. Pakula	All the President's Men	
1976 (49th)	Lina Wertmüller	Seven Beauties	
1977 (50th)	Woody Allen	Annie Hall	
1977 (50th)	George Lucas	Star Wars	
1977 (50th)	Herbert Ross	The Turning Point	
1977 (50th)	Steven Spielberg	Close Encounters of the Third Kind	
1977 (50th)	Fred Zinnemann	Julia	
1978 (51st)	Michael Cimino	The Deer Hunter	
1978 (51st)	Woody Allen	Interiors	
1978 (51st)	Hal Ashby	Coming Home	
1978 (51st)	Warren Beatty & Buck Henry	Heaven Can Wait	
1978 (51st)	Alan Parker	Midnight Express	
1979 (52nd)	Robert Benton	Kramer vs. Kramer	
1979 (52nd)	Francis Ford Coppola	Apocalypse Now	
1979 (52nd)	Bob Fosse	All That Jazz	
1979 (52nd)	Édouard Molinaro	La Cage aux Folles	
1979 (52nd)	Peter Yates	Breaking Away	

=== 1980s ===
Year	Director(s)	Film	Ref.
1980 (53rd)	Robert Redford	Ordinary People	
1980 (53rd)	David Lynch	The Elephant Man	
1980 (53rd)	Roman Polanski	Tess	
1980 (53rd)	Richard Rush	The Stunt Man	
1980 (53rd)	Martin Scorsese	Raging Bull	
1981 (54th)	Warren Beatty	Reds	
1981 (54th)	Hugh Hudson	Chariots of Fire	
1981 (54th)	Louis Malle	Atlantic City	
1981 (54th)	Mark Rydell	On Golden Pond	
1981 (54th)	Steven Spielberg	Raiders of the Lost Ark	
1982 (55th)	Richard Attenborough	Gandhi	
1982 (55th)	Sidney Lumet	The Verdict	
1982 (55th)	Wolfgang Petersen	Das Boot	
1982 (55th)	Sydney Pollack	Tootsie	
1982 (55th)	Steven Spielberg	E.T. the Extra-Terrestrial	
1983 (56th)	James L. Brooks	Terms of Endearment	
1983 (56th)	Bruce Beresford	Tender Mercies	
1983 (56th)	Ingmar Bergman	Fanny and Alexander	
1983 (56th)	Mike Nichols	Silkwood	
1983 (56th)	Peter Yates	The Dresser	
1984 (57th)	Miloš Forman	Amadeus	
1984 (57th)	Woody Allen	Broadway Danny Rose	
1984 (57th)	Robert Benton	Places in the Heart	
1984 (57th)	Roland Joffé	The Killing Fields	
1984 (57th)	David Lean	A Passage to India	
1985 (58th)	Sydney Pollack	Out of Africa	
1985 (58th)	Héctor Babenco	Kiss of the Spider Woman	
1985 (58th)	John Huston	Prizzi's Honor	
1985 (58th)	Akira Kurosawa	Ran	
1985 (58th)	Peter Weir	Witness	
1986 (59th)	Oliver Stone	Platoon	
1986 (59th)	Woody Allen	Hannah and Her Sisters	
1986 (59th)	James Ivory	A Room with a View	
1986 (59th)	Roland Joffé	The Mission	
1986 (59th)	David Lynch	Blue Velvet	
1987 (60th)	Bernardo Bertolucci	The Last Emperor	
1987 (60th)	John Boorman	Hope and Glory	
1987 (60th)	Lasse Hallström	My Life as a Dog	
1987 (60th)	Norman Jewison	Moonstruck	
1987 (60th)	Adrian Lyne	Fatal Attraction	
1988 (61st)	Barry Levinson	Rain Man	
1988 (61st)	Charles Crichton	A Fish Called Wanda	
1988 (61st)	Mike Nichols	Working Girl	
1988 (61st)	Alan Parker	Mississippi Burning	
1988 (61st)	Martin Scorsese	The Last Temptation of Christ	
1989 (62nd)	Oliver Stone	Born on the Fourth of July	
1989 (62nd)	Woody Allen	Crimes and Misdemeanors	
1989 (62nd)	Kenneth Branagh	Henry V	
1989 (62nd)	Jim Sheridan	My Left Foot	
1989 (62nd)	Peter Weir	Dead Poets Society	

=== 1990s ===
Year	Director(s)	Film	Ref.
1990 (63rd)	Kevin Costner	Dances With Wolves	
1990 (63rd)	Francis Ford Coppola	The Godfather Part III	
1990 (63rd)	Stephen Frears	The Grifters	
1990 (63rd)	Barbet Schroeder	Reversal of Fortune	
1990 (63rd)	Martin Scorsese	Goodfellas	
1991 (64th)	Jonathan Demme	The Silence of the Lambs	
1991 (64th)	Barry Levinson	Bugsy	
1991 (64th)	Ridley Scott	Thelma & Louise	
1991 (64th)	John Singleton	Boyz n the Hood	
1991 (64th)	Oliver Stone	JFK	
1992 (65th)	Clint Eastwood	Unforgiven	
1992 (65th)	Robert Altman	The Player	
1992 (65th)	Martin Brest	Scent of a Woman	
1992 (65th)	James Ivory	Howards End	
1992 (65th)	Neil Jordan	The Crying Game	
1993 (66th)	Steven Spielberg	Schindler's List	
1993 (66th)	Robert Altman	Short Cuts	
1993 (66th)	Jane Campion	The Piano	
1993 (66th)	James Ivory	The Remains of the Day	
1993 (66th)	Jim Sheridan	In the Name of the Father	
1994 (67th)	Robert Zemeckis	Forrest Gump	
1994 (67th)	Woody Allen	Bullets Over Broadway	
1994 (67th)	Krzysztof Kieślowski	Three Colours: Red	
1994 (67th)	Robert Redford	Quiz Show	
1994 (67th)	Quentin Tarantino	Pulp Fiction	
1995 (68th)	Mel Gibson	Braveheart	
1995 (68th)	Mike Figgis	Leaving Las Vegas	
1995 (68th)	Chris Noonan	Babe	
1995 (68th)	Michael Radford	Il Postino: The Postman	
1995 (68th)	Tim Robbins	Dead Man Walking	
1996 (69th)	Anthony Minghella	The English Patient	
1996 (69th)	Joel Coen	Fargo	
1996 (69th)	Miloš Forman	The People vs. Larry Flynt	
1996 (69th)	Scott Hicks	Shine	
1996 (69th)	Mike Leigh	Secrets & Lies	
1997 (70th)	James Cameron	Titanic	
1997 (70th)	Peter Cattaneo	The Full Monty	
1997 (70th)	Atom Egoyan	The Sweet Hereafter	
1997 (70th)	Curtis Hanson	L.A. Confidential	
1997 (70th)	Gus Van Sant	Good Will Hunting	
1998 (71st)	Steven Spielberg	Saving Private Ryan	
1998 (71st)	Roberto Benigni	Life Is Beautiful	
1998 (71st)	John Madden	Shakespeare in Love	
1998 (71st)	Terrence Malick	The Thin Red Line	
1998 (71st)	Peter Weir	The Truman Show	
1999 (72nd)	Sam Mendes	American Beauty	
1999 (72nd)	Lasse Hallström	The Cider House Rules	
1999 (72nd)	Spike Jonze	Being John Malkovich	
1999 (72nd)	Michael Mann	The Insider	
1999 (72nd)	M. Night Shyamalan	The Sixth Sense	

=== 2000s ===
Year	Director(s)	Film	Ref.
2000 (73rd)	Steven Soderbergh	Traffic	
2000 (73rd)	Stephen Daldry	Billy Elliot	
2000 (73rd)	Ang Lee	Crouching Tiger, Hidden Dragon	
2000 (73rd)	Ridley Scott	Gladiator	
2000 (73rd)	Steven Soderbergh	Erin Brockovich	
2001 (74th)	Ron Howard	A Beautiful Mind	
2001 (74th)	Robert Altman	Gosford Park	
2001 (74th)	Peter Jackson	The Lord of the Rings: The Fellowship of the Ring	
2001 (74th)	David Lynch	Mulholland Drive	
2001 (74th)	Ridley Scott	Black Hawk Down	
2002 (75th)	Roman Polanski	The Pianist	
2002 (75th)	Pedro Almodóvar	Talk to Her	
2002 (75th)	Stephen Daldry	The Hours	
2002 (75th)	Rob Marshall	Chicago	
2002 (75th)	Martin Scorsese	Gangs of New York	
2003 (76th)	Peter Jackson	The Lord of the Rings: The Return of the King	
2003 (76th)	Sofia Coppola	Lost in Translation	
2003 (76th)	Clint Eastwood	Mystic River	
2003 (76th)	Fernando Meirelles	City of God	
2003 (76th)	Peter Weir	Master and Commander: The Far Side of the World	
2004 (77th)	Clint Eastwood	Million Dollar Baby	
2004 (77th)	Taylor Hackford	Ray	
2004 (77th)	Mike Leigh	Vera Drake	
2004 (77th)	Alexander Payne	Sideways	
2004 (77th)	Martin Scorsese	The Aviator	
2005 (78th)	Ang Lee	Brokeback Mountain	
2005 (78th)	George Clooney	Good Night, and Good Luck	
2005 (78th)	Paul Haggis	Crash	
2005 (78th)	Bennett Miller	Capote	
2005 (78th)	Steven Spielberg	Munich	
2006 (79th)	Martin Scorsese	The Departed	
2006 (79th)	Clint Eastwood	Letters from Iwo Jima	
2006 (79th)	Stephen Frears	The Queen	
2006 (79th)	Paul Greengrass	United 93	
2006 (79th)	Alejandro González Iñárritu	Babel	
2007 (80th)	Joel Coen and Ethan Coen	No Country for Old Men	
2007 (80th)	Paul Thomas Anderson	There Will Be Blood	
2007 (80th)	Tony Gilroy	Michael Clayton	
2007 (80th)	Jason Reitman	Juno	
2007 (80th)	Julian Schnabel	The Diving Bell and the Butterfly	
2008 (81st)	Danny Boyle	Slumdog Millionaire	
2008 (81st)	Stephen Daldry	The Reader	
2008 (81st)	David Fincher	The Curious Case of Benjamin Button	
2008 (81st)	Ron Howard	Frost/Nixon	
2008 (81st)	Gus Van Sant	Milk	
2009 (82nd)	Kathryn Bigelow	The Hurt Locker	
2009 (82nd)	James Cameron	Avatar	
2009 (82nd)	Lee Daniels	Precious	
2009 (82nd)	Jason Reitman	Up in the Air	
2009 (82nd)	Quentin Tarantino	Inglourious Basterds	

=== 2010s ===
Year	Director(s)	Film	Ref.
2010 (83rd)	Tom Hooper	The King's Speech	
2010 (83rd)	Darren Aronofsky	Black Swan	
2010 (83rd)	Joel Coen and Ethan Coen	True Grit	
2010 (83rd)	David Fincher	The Social Network	
2010 (83rd)	David O. Russell	The Fighter	
2011 (84th)	Michel Hazanavicius	The Artist	
2011 (84th)	Woody Allen	Midnight in Paris	
2011 (84th)	Terrence Malick	The Tree of Life	
2011 (84th)	Alexander Payne	The Descendants	
2011 (84th)	Martin Scorsese	Hugo	
2012 (85th)	Ang Lee	Life of Pi	
2012 (85th)	Michael Haneke	Amour	
2012 (85th)	David O. Russell	Silver Linings Playbook	
2012 (85th)	Steven Spielberg	Lincoln	
2012 (85th)	Benh Zeitlin	Beasts of the Southern Wild	
2013 (86th)	Alfonso Cuarón	Gravity	
2013 (86th)	Steve McQueen	12 Years a Slave	
2013 (86th)	Alexander Payne	Nebraska	
2013 (86th)	David O. Russell	American Hustle	
2013 (86th)	Martin Scorsese	The Wolf of Wall Street	
2014 (87th)	Alejandro G. Iñárritu	Birdman	
2014 (87th)	Wes Anderson	The Grand Budapest Hotel	
2014 (87th)	Richard Linklater	Boyhood	
2014 (87th)	Bennett Miller	Foxcatcher	
2014 (87th)	Morten Tyldum	The Imitation Game	
2015 (88th)	Alejandro G. Iñárritu	The Revenant	
2015 (88th)	Lenny Abrahamson	Room	
2015 (88th)	Tom McCarthy	Spotlight	
2015 (88th)	Adam McKay	The Big Short	
2015 (88th)	George Miller	Mad Max: Fury Road	
2016 (89th)	Damien Chazelle	La La Land	
2016 (89th)	Mel Gibson	Hacksaw Ridge	
2016 (89th)	Barry Jenkins	Moonlight	
2016 (89th)	Kenneth Lonergan	Manchester by the Sea	
2016 (89th)	Denis Villeneuve	Arrival	
2017 (90th)	Guillermo del Toro	The Shape of Water	
2017 (90th)	Paul Thomas Anderson	Phantom Thread	
2017 (90th)	Greta Gerwig	Lady Bird	
2017 (90th)	Christopher Nolan	Dunkirk	
2017 (90th)	Jordan Peele	Get Out	
2018 (91st)	Alfonso Cuarón	Roma	
2018 (91st)	Yorgos Lanthimos	The Favourite	
2018 (91st)	Spike Lee	BlacKkKlansman	
2018 (91st)	Adam McKay	Vice	
2018 (91st)	Paweł Pawlikowski	Cold War	
2019 (92nd)	Bong Joon-ho	Parasite	
2019 (92nd)	Sam Mendes	1917	
2019 (92nd)	Todd Phillips	Joker	
2019 (92nd)	Martin Scorsese	The Irishman	
2019 (92nd)	Quentin Tarantino	Once Upon a Time in Hollywood	

=== 2020s ===
Year	Director(s)	Film	Ref.
2020/21 (Note: The eligibility period for the 93rd ceremony was extended through to February 28, 2021, due to the impact of the COVID-19 pandemic.) (93rd)	Chloé Zhao	Nomadland	
2020/21 (93rd)	Lee Isaac Chung	Minari	
2020/21 (93rd)	Emerald Fennell	Promising Young Woman	
2020/21 (93rd)	David Fincher	Mank	
2020/21 (93rd)	Thomas Vinterberg	Another Round	
2021 (Note: As a consequence of the eligibility period for the 93rd ceremony being extended through to February 28, 2021, the eligibility period for the 94th ceremony was truncated to ten months, running from March 1 to December 31, 2021.) (94th)	Jane Campion	The Power of the Dog	
2021 (94th)	Paul Thomas Anderson	Licorice Pizza	
2021 (94th)	Kenneth Branagh	Belfast	
2021 (94th)	Ryusuke Hamaguchi	Drive My Car	
2021 (94th)	Steven Spielberg	West Side Story	
2022 (95th)	Daniel Kwan and Daniel Scheinert	Everything Everywhere All at Once	
2022 (95th)	Todd Field	Tár	
2022 (95th)	Martin McDonagh	The Banshees of Inisherin	
2022 (95th)	Ruben Östlund	Triangle of Sadness	
2022 (95th)	Steven Spielberg	The Fabelmans	
2023 (96th)	Christopher Nolan	Oppenheimer	
2023 (96th)	Jonathan Glazer	The Zone of Interest	
2023 (96th)	Yorgos Lanthimos	Poor Things	
2023 (96th)	Martin Scorsese	Killers of the Flower Moon	
2023 (96th)	Justine Triet	Anatomy of a Fall	
2024 (97th)	Sean Baker	Anora	
2024 (97th)	Jacques Audiard	Emilia Pérez	
2024 (97th)	Brady Corbet	The Brutalist	
2024 (97th)	Coralie Fargeat	The Substance	
2024 (97th)	James Mangold	A Complete Unknown	
2025 (98th)	Paul Thomas Anderson	One Battle After Another	
2025 (98th)	Ryan Coogler	Sinners	
2025 (98th)	Josh Safdie	Marty Supreme	
2025 (98th)	Joachim Trier	Sentimental Value	
2025 (98th)	Chloé Zhao	Hamnet	

== Multiple wins and nominations ==
=== Multiple wins ===
Wins	Director
4	John Ford
3	Frank Capra
3	William Wyler
2	Frank Borzage
2	Alfonso Cuarón
2	Clint Eastwood
2	Miloš Forman
2	Alejandro G. Iñárritu
2	Elia Kazan
2	David Lean
2	Ang Lee
2	Frank Lloyd
2	Joseph L. Mankiewicz
2	Leo McCarey
2	Lewis Milestone
2	Steven Spielberg
2	George Stevens
2	Oliver Stone
2	Billy Wilder
2	Robert Wise (Note: Wise earned two individual nominations (resulting in one win); and one joint nomination with Jerome Robbins, which also resulted in the pair of them winning.)
2	Fred Zinnemann

=== Three or more nominations ===
Nominations	Director
12	William Wyler
10	Martin Scorsese
9	Steven Spielberg
8	Billy Wilder
7	Woody Allen
7	David Lean
7	Fred Zinnemann
6	Frank Capra
5	Robert Altman
5	Clarence Brown
5	George Cukor
5	John Ford
5	Alfred Hitchcock
5	John Huston
5	Elia Kazan
5	George Stevens
5	King Vidor
4	Paul Thomas Anderson
4	Francis Ford Coppola
4	Michael Curtiz
4	Clint Eastwood
4	Federico Fellini
4	Stanley Kubrick
4	Frank Lloyd
4	Sidney Lumet
4	Joseph L. Mankiewicz
4	Mike Nichols
4	Peter Weir
3
3	Ingmar Bergman
3	Richard Brooks
3	Joel Coen (Note: While the Coen Brothers, as a directing duo, earned two nominations, their work on Fargo was credited as being split apart: Ethan was given sole producer credit, while Joel was listed as the sole director. Joel thus has one additional directing nomination combined with his work as part of their dual efforts.)
3	Stephen Daldry
3	David Fincher
3	Miloš Forman
3	Bob Fosse
3	Alejandro González Iñárritu
3	James Ivory
3	Norman Jewison
3	Stanley Kramer
3	Ang Lee
3	Ernst Lubitsch
3	David Lynch
3	Leo McCarey
3	Lewis Milestone
3	Alexander Payne
3	Arthur Penn
3	Roman Polanski
3	Sydney Pollack
3	Carol Reed
3	David O. Russell
3	John Schlesinger
3	Ridley Scott
3	Oliver Stone
3	Quentin Tarantino
3	William A. Wellman
3	Robert Wise
3	Sam Wood

== Age superlatives ==
Record	Director	Film	Age	Ref.
Oldest winner	Clint Eastwood	Million Dollar Baby	74 years, 272 days	
Oldest nominee	Martin Scorsese	Killers of the Flower Moon	81 years, 67 days	
Youngest winner	Damien Chazelle	La La Land	32 years, 38 days	
Youngest nominee	John Singleton	Boyz n the Hood	24 years, 44 days	

== Records ==
- John Ford has received the most awards in this category, with four. Frank Capra and William Wyler won three each.
  - Wyler has the most nominations, with 12—including a record four years in a row. Martin Scorsese is currently second, with 10 nominations.
  - Clarence Brown has the most nominations without a win (6). Alfred Hitchcock, King Vidor, and Robert Altman each received 5 nominations without a win.
- Four directors have won twice for films that did not win Best Picture: Frank Borzage, George Stevens, Ang Lee, and Alfonso Cuarón.
  - Of John Ford's four wins, the only film which also won Best Picture was How Green Was My Valley (1941).
  - Ford (1940–1941), Joseph L. Mankiewicz (1949–1950), and Alejandro González Iñárritu (2014–2015) are the only directors to have won the award in two consecutive years.
  - Francis Ford Coppola is the only director to be nominated for each film of a trilogy, The Godfather trilogy, winning for the second film.
- Four directing teams have been nominated together (a total of five times, winning on three occasions): Robert Wise and Jerome Robbins for West Side Story (1961, winners); Warren Beatty and Buck Henry for Heaven Can Wait (1978); Joel and Ethan Coen for No Country for Old Men (2007, winners) and True Grit (2010); and Daniel Kwan and Daniel Scheinert for Everything Everywhere All at Once (2022, winners).
  - The Coen Brothers are the only siblings to have won the award.
- Six directors won the award for their feature film debut: Delbert Mann for Marty (1955), Jerome Robbins for West Side Story (1961), Robert Redford for Ordinary People (1980), James L. Brooks for Terms of Endearment (1983), Kevin Costner for Dances With Wolves (1990), and Sam Mendes for American Beauty (1999).
  - Robbins is the only director to have won for his only career directing credit.
- Lina Wertmüller was the first woman nominated in the category, for Seven Beauties (1976).
  - Kathryn Bigelow became the first woman to win the award, for The Hurt Locker (2009).
  - Chloé Zhao is the first woman of color to win the award, for Nomadland (2020). She became the second woman nominated twice for the award for Hamnet (2025).
  - Jane Campion is the first woman to be nominated twice for the award: The Piano (1993) and The Power of the Dog (2021)—winning for the latter.
- John Singleton is the first Black (and youngest) nominee for Boyz n the Hood (1991).
  - Steve McQueen is the first Black nominee to direct a Best Picture winner, for 12 Years a Slave. Barry Jenkins subsequently did the same three years later, with Moonlight (2016).
- David Lean was the first non-American to win—and twice, for The Bridge on the River Kwai (1957) and Lawrence of Arabia (1962). This did not recur for five decades with any other non-American directors, until Ang Lee, Alfonso Cuarón, and Alejandro González Iñárritu each won twice themselves.
  - Lee was the first Asian director to win the award, for Brokeback Mountain (2005). He won again for Life of Pi (2012).
  - Cuarón was the first Mexican (and Latin American) director to win the award, for Gravity (2013). He won again for Roma (2018).
- No married or ex-married couple have won the award for the same film, though James Cameron (1997's Titanic) and Kathryn Bigelow (2008's The Hurt Locker) were the first (and so far, only) ex-married couple to both win the award.
  - It was also the first time in Oscar history that ex-married couple were nominated against each other in competition for an award in the same year.

== See also ==
- BAFTA Award for Best Direction
- Critics' Choice Movie Award for Best Director
- Directors Guild of America Award for Outstanding Directing – Feature Film
- Golden Globe Award for Best Director
- Independent Spirit Award for Best Director
- List of Academy Award–nominated films

== Bibliography ==
- Crouse, Richard (2005). Reel Winners: Movie Award Trivia. Toronto, Ontario, Canada: University of Toronto Press. ISBN 978-1-55002-574-3.
- Levy, Emanuel (2003). All About Oscar: The History and Politics of the Academy Awards. New York, United States: Continuum International Publishing Group. ISBN 978-0-8264-1452-6.
