= List of female Academy Award winners and nominees for non-gendered categories =

This article lists and details women who have won or been nominated for Academy Awards in non-gender-specific categories. The nominees are arranged, in alphabetical order, by film title, with the winners listed first. This list is current as of the 98th Academy Awards ceremony held on March 15, 2026.

== Best Animated Feature ==
Academy Award for Best Animated Feature
Year	Name	Film	Status	Notes
2007	Marjane Satrapi	Persepolis	Nominated	First woman to be nominated for Best Animated Feature. Shared with Vincent Paronnaud.
2011	Jennifer Yuh Nelson	Kung Fu Panda 2	Nominated	First woman of color to be nominated for Best Animated Feature.
2012	Brenda Chapman	Brave	Won	First woman to win for Best Animated Feature. Shared with Mark Andrews.
2013 (Note: The first year to have multiple female nominees competing against each other in this category.)	Jennifer Lee	Frozen	Won	Shared with Chris Buck and Peter Del Vecho.
2013	Kristine Belson	The Croods	Nominated	Shared with Kirk DeMicco and Chris Sanders.
2014	Bonnie Arnold	How to Train Your Dragon 2	Nominated	Shared with Dean DeBlois.
2015	Rosa Tran	Anomalisa	Nominated	Shared with Charlie Kaufman and Duke Johnson.
2016	Arianne Sutner	Kubo and the Two Strings	Nominated	Shared with Travis Knight.
2016	Osnat Shurer	Moana	Nominated	Shared with John Musker and Ron Clements.
2017 (Note: All five films nominated for Best Animated Feature this year were produced by both female and male producers.)	Darla K. Anderson	Coco	Won	Shared with Lee Unkrich.
2017	Ramsey Ann Naito	The Boss Baby	Nominated	Shared with Tom McGrath.
2017	Nora Twomey	The Breadwinner	Nominated	Shared with Anthony Leo.
2017	Lori Forte	Ferdinand	Nominated	Shared with Carlos Saldanha.
2017	Dorota Kobiela	Loving Vincent	Nominated	Shared with Hugh Welchman and Ivan Mactaggart.
2018	Nicole Paradis Grindle	Incredibles 2	Nominated	Shared with Brad Bird and John Walker.
2019	Bonnie Arnold	How to Train Your Dragon: The Hidden World	Nominated	Among the first women with multiple nominations in this category. Shared with Dean DeBlois and Brad Lewis.
2019	Jinko Gotoh; Marisa Román	Klaus	Nominated	Shared with Sergio Pablos.
2019	Arianne Sutner	Missing Link	Nominated	Among the first women with multiple nominations in this category. Shared with Chris Butler and Travis Knight.
2020	Dana Murray	Soul	Won	Shared with Pete Docter.
2020	Kori Rae	Onward	Nominated	Shared with Dan Scanlon.
2020	Gennie Rim; Peilin Chou	Over the Moon	Nominated	Shared with Glen Keane.
2021	Yvett Merino	Encanto	Won	First Latina to win and be nominated for Best Animated Feature. Shared with Jared Bush, Byron Howard, and Clark Spencer.
2021	Monica Hellström; Signe Byrge Sørensen; Charlotte de la Gournerie	Flee	Nominated	Shared with Jonas Poher Rasmussen. First animated documentary to be nominated in this category.
2021	Andrea Warren	Luca	Nominated	Shared with Enrico Casarosa.
2021	Osnat Shurer	Raya and the Last Dragon	Nominated	Shared with Don Hall, Carlos López Estrada, and Peter Del Vecho.
2022	Elisabeth Holm; Caroline Kaplan	Marcel the Shell with Shoes On	Nominated	Shared with Dean Fleischer Camp, Andrew Goldman, and Paul Mezey.
2022	Domee Shi; Lindsey Collins	Turning Red	Nominated	
2023	Denise Ream	Elemental	Nominated	Shared with Peter Sohn.
2023	Karen Ryan; Julie Zackary	Nimona	Nominated	Shared with Nick Bruno and Troy Quane.
2023	Sandra Tapia Díaz	Robot Dreams	Nominated	Shared with Pablo Berger, Ibon Cormenzana, and Ignasi Estapé.
2023	Amy Pascal	Spider-Man: Across the Spider-Verse	Nominated	Shared with Kemp Powers, Justin K. Thompson, Phil Lord, and Christopher Miller.
2024	Liz Kearney	Memoir of a Snail	Nominated	Shared with Adam Elliot.
2025	Maggie Kang; Michelle L.M. Wong	KPop Demon Hunters	Won	Shared with Chris Appelhans.
2025	Sophie Mas; Natalie Portman	Arco	Nominated	Shared with Ugo Bienvenu and Félix de Givry.
2025	Madeline Sharafian; Domee Shi; Mary Alice Drumm	Elio	Nominated	Shared with Adrian Molina.
2025	Maïlys Vallade; Nidia Santiago	Little Amélie or the Character of Rain	Nominated	Shared with Liane-Cho Han and Henri Magalon.
2025	Yvett Merino	Zootopia 2	Nominated	Shared with Jared Bush and Byron Howard.

== Best Casting ==
At least one woman has been nominated for Best Casting at every ceremony since the category's inception.

Academy Award for Best Casting
Year	Name	Film	Status	Notes
2025	Cassandra Kulukundis	One Battle After Another	Won	First person to win for Best Casting. Among the inaugural nominees in this category.
2025	Nina Gold	Hamnet	Nominated	Among the inaugural nominees in this category.
2025	Jennifer Venditti	Marty Supreme	Nominated	Among the inaugural nominees in this category.
2025	Francine Maisler	Sinners	Nominated	Among the inaugural nominees in this category.

== Best Cinematography ==
Academy Award for Best Cinematography
Year	Name	Film	Status	Notes
2017	Rachel Morrison	Mudbound	Nominated	First woman to be nominated for Best Cinematography.
2021	Ari Wegner	The Power of the Dog	Nominated	
2022	Mandy Walker	Elvis	Nominated	
2025	Autumn Durald Arkapaw	Sinners	Won	First woman and woman of color to win for Best Cinematography. First woman of color to be nominated for Best Cinematography.

== Best Costume Design ==
At least one woman has been nominated for Best Costume Design at every ceremony since the category's inception.

Academy Award for Best Costume Design (Note: This category was re-introduced at the 40th Academy Awards by merging two previously separate categories for Best Costume Design (Black-and-White) and Best Costume Design (Color) into a single Best Costume Design category.)
Year	Name	Film	Status	Notes
1948	Black-and-White			
1948	Irene	B.F.'s Daughter	Nominated	Among the inaugural nominees in costume categories.
1948	Color			
1948	Dorothy Jeakins; Karinska	Joan of Arc	Won	First women to win in costume categories. Among the inaugural nominees in costume categories.
1948	Edith Head	The Emperor Waltz	Nominated	Among the inaugural nominees in costume categories. Shared with Gile Steele.
1949	Black-and-White			
1949	Edith Head	The Heiress	Won	First woman to win for Best Costume Design (B&W). First woman with multiple nominations in costume categories. First woman to be nominated in both costume categories. Shared with Gile Steele.
1949	Color			
1949	Marjorie Best; Leah Rhodes	The Adventures of Don Juan	Won	Shared with Travilla.
1949	Kay Nelson	Mother Is a Freshman	Nominated	
1950	Black-and-White			
1950	Edith Head	All About Eve	Won	First woman with multiple wins for Best Costume Design (B&W). Shared with Charles LeMaire.
1950	Color			
1950	Edith Head; Dorothy Jeakins; Elois Jenssen; Gwen Wakeling	Samson and Delilah	Won	Jeakins was the first woman with multiple wins for Best Costume Design (Color). Head was the first woman to win in both costume categories. Shared with Gile Steele.
1951	Black-and-White			
1951	Edith Head	A Place in the Sun	Won	
1951	Renié	The Model and the Marriage Broker	Nominated	Shared with Charles LeMaire.
1951	Margaret Furse	The Mudlark	Nominated	Shared with Edward Stevenson.
1951	Lucinda Ballard	A Streetcar Named Desire	Nominated	
1951	Color			
1951	Irene Sharaff	An American in Paris	Won	First LGBT woman to be nominated in a non-acting category and first to win in any category. Shared with Orry-Kelly and Walter Plunkett.
1951	Helen Rose	The Great Caruso	Nominated	Shared with Gile Steele.
1952	Black-and-White			
1952	Helen Rose	The Bad and the Beautiful	Won	
1952	Edith Head	Carrie	Nominated	
1952	Dorothy Jeakins	My Cousin Rachel	Nominated	Shared with Charles LeMaire.
1952	Sheila O'Brien	Sudden Fear	Nominated	
1952	Color			
1952	Edith Head; Dorothy Jeakins	The Greatest Show on Earth	Nominated	Shared with Miles White.
1952	Karinska; Mary Wills	Hans Christian Andersen	Nominated	Shared with Clavé.
1952	Helen Rose	The Merry Widow	Nominated	Shared with Gile Steele.
1953	Black-and-White			
1953	Edith Head	Roman Holiday	Won	
1953	Helen Rose	Dream Wife	Nominated	Shared with Herschel McCoy.
1953	Renié	The President's Lady	Nominated	Shared with Charles LeMaire.
1953	Color			
1953	Mary Ann Nyberg	The Band Wagon	Nominated	
1953	Irene Sharaff	Call Me Madam	Nominated	
1954	Black-and-White			
1954	Edith Head	Sabrina	Won	
1954	Rosine Delamare	The Earrings of Madame de...	Nominated	Shared with Georges Annenkov. Among the first foreign language films to be nominated in costume categories.
1954	Helen Rose	Executive Suite	Nominated	
1954	Color			
1954	Irene Sharaff	Brigadoon	Nominated	
1954	Mary Ann Nyberg; Irene Sharaff	A Star Is Born	Nominated	Shared with Jean Louis.
1955	Black-and-White			
1955	Helen Rose	I'll Cry Tomorrow	Won	
1955	Beatrice Dawson	The Pickwick Papers	Nominated	
1955	Edith Head	The Rose Tattoo	Nominated	
1955	Color			
1955	Irene Sharaff	Guys and Dolls	Nominated	
1955	Helen Rose	Interrupted Melody	Nominated	
1955	Edith Head	To Catch a Thief	Nominated	
1955	Mary Wills	The Virgin Queen	Nominated	Shared with Charles LeMaire.
1956	Black-and-White			
1956	Helen Rose	The Power and the Prize	Nominated	
1956	Edith Head	The Proud and Profane	Nominated	
1956	Mary Wills	Teenage Rebel	Nominated	Shared with Charles LeMaire.
1956	Color			
1956	Irene Sharaff	The King and I	Won	
1956	Marjorie Best	Giant	Nominated	Shared with Moss Mabry.
1956	Edith Head; Dorothy Jeakins	The Ten Commandments	Nominated	Shared with Ralph Jester, John Jensen, and Arnold Friberg.
1956	Maria De Matteis	War and Peace	Nominated	
Costume Design
1957	Edith Head	Funny Face	Nominated	Shared with Hubert de Givenchy.
1958	Edith Head	The Buccaneer	Nominated	Shared with Ralph Jester and John Jensen.
1958	Mary Wills	A Certain Smile	Nominated	Shared with Charles LeMaire.
1959 (Note: All five films nominated for Best Costume Design (Color) this year featured exclusively female nominees.)	Black-and-White			
1959	Edith Head	Career	Nominated	
1959	Mary Wills	The Diary of Anne Frank	Nominated	Shared with Charles LeMaire.
1959	Helen Rose	The Gazebo	Nominated	
1959	Color			
1959	Elizabeth Haffenden	Ben-Hur	Won	
1959	Adele Palmer	The Best of Everything	Nominated	
1959	Renié	The Big Fisherman	Nominated	
1959	Edith Head	The Five Pennies	Nominated	
1959	Irene Sharaff	Porgy and Bess	Nominated	
1960	Black-and-White			
1960	Edith Head	The Facts of Life	Won	Shared with Edward Stevenson.
1960	Deni Vachlioti	Never on Sunday	Nominated	
1960	Marik Vos	The Virgin Spring	Nominated	
1960	Color			
1960	Irene Sharaff	Can-Can	Nominated	
1960	Irene	Midnight Lace	Nominated	
1960	Edith Head	Pepe	Nominated	
1960	Marjorie Best	Sunrise at Campobello	Nominated	
1961	Black-and-White			
1961	Dorothy Jeakins	The Children's Hour	Nominated	
1961	Color			
1961	Irene Sharaff	West Side Story	Won	
1961	Irene Sharaff	Flower Drum Song	Nominated	
1961	Edith Head	Pocketful of Miracles	Nominated	Shared with Walter Plunkett.
1962	Black-and-White			
1962	Norma Koch	What Ever Happened to Baby Jane?	Won	
1962	Edith Head	The Man Who Shot Liberty Valance	Nominated	
1962	Ruth Morley	The Miracle Worker	Nominated	
1962	Denny Vachlioti	Phaedra	Nominated	
1962	Color			
1962	Mary Wills	The Wonderful World of the Brothers Grimm	Won	
1962	Dorothy Jeakins	The Music Man	Nominated	
1962	Edith Head	My Geisha	Nominated	
1963	Black-and-White			
1963	Edith Head	Love with the Proper Stranger	Nominated	
1963	Edith Head	Wives and Lovers	Nominated	
1963	Color			
1963	Renié; Irene Sharaff	Cleopatra	Won	Shared with Vittorio Nino Novarese.
1963	Edith Head	A New Kind of Love	Nominated	
1964	Black-and-White			
1964	Dorothy Jeakins	The Night of the Iguana	Won	
1964	Edith Head	A House Is Not a Home	Nominated	
1964	Norma Koch	Hush… Hush, Sweet Charlotte	Nominated	
1964	Color			
1964	Margaret Furse	Becket	Nominated	
1964	Edith Head	What a Way to Go!	Nominated	Shared with Moss Mabry.
1965	Black-and-White			
1965	Julie Harris	Darling	Won	
1965	Edith Head	The Slender Thread	Nominated	
1965	Color			
1965	Phyllis Dalton	Doctor Zhivago	Won	
1965	Marjorie Best	The Greatest Story Ever Told	Nominated	Shared with Vittorio Nino Novarese.
1965	Edith Head	Inside Daisy Clover	Nominated	Shared with Bill Thomas.
1965	Dorothy Jeakins	The Sound of Music	Nominated	
1966	Black-and-White			
1966	Irene Sharaff	Who's Afraid of Virginia Woolf?	Won	
1966	Helen Rose	Mister Buddwing	Nominated	
1966	Jocelyn Rickards	Morgan!	Nominated	
1966	Color			
1966	Joan Bridge; Elizabeth Haffenden	A Man for All Seasons	Won	
1966	Dorothy Jeakins	Hawaii	Nominated	
1966	Edith Head	The Oscar	Nominated	
Costume Design
1967	Theadora Van Runkle	Bonnie and Clyde	Nominated	
1967	Irene Sharaff	The Taming of the Shrew	Nominated	Shared with Danilo Donati.
1968	Margaret Furse	The Lion in Winter	Nominated	
1968	Phyllis Dalton	Oliver!	Nominated	
1969	Margaret Furse	Anne of the Thousand Days	Won	
1969	Irene Sharaff	Hello, Dolly!	Nominated	
1969	Edith Head	Sweet Charity	Nominated	
1970	Edith Head	Airport	Nominated	
1970	Margaret Furse	Scrooge	Nominated	
1971	Yvonne Blake	Nicholas and Alexandra	Won	Shared with Antonio Castillo.
1971	Margaret Furse	Mary, Queen of Scots	Nominated	
1972	Anna Hill Johnstone	The Godfather	Nominated	
1972	Norma Koch	Lady Sings the Blues	Nominated	Shared with Ray Aghayan and Bob Mackie.
1973	Edith Head	The Sting	Won	Holds the record for most wins in this category, with eight. Holds the record for most wins by a woman in any category, with eight.
1973	Marik Vos	Cries and Whispers	Nominated	
1973	Dorothy Jeakins	The Way We Were	Nominated	Shared with Moss Mabry.
1974	Theoni V. Aldredge	The Great Gatsby	Won	
1974	Anthea Sylbert	Chinatown	Nominated	
1974	Theadora Van Runkle	The Godfather Part II	Nominated	
1975	Milena Canonero; Ulla-Britt Söderlund	Barry Lyndon	Won	
1975	Yvonne Blake	The Four Musketeers	Nominated	Shared with Ron Talsky.
1975	Karin Erskine; Henny Noremark	The Magic Flute	Nominated	
1975	Edith Head	The Man Who Would Be King	Nominated	
1976	Mary Wills	The Passover Plot	Nominated	
1977	Edith Head	Airport '77	Nominated	Holds the record for most nominations in this category, with 35. Holds the record for most nominations by a woman in any category, with 35. Shared with Burton Miller.
1977	Anthea Sylbert	Julia	Nominated	
1977	Florence Klotz	A Little Night Music	Nominated	
1977	Irene Sharaff	The Other Side of Midnight	Nominated	
1978	Renié	Caravans	Nominated	
1978	Patricia Norris	Days of Heaven	Nominated	
1979	Shirley Ann Russell	Agatha	Nominated	
1979	Ambra Danon	La Cage aux Folles	Nominated	Shared with Piero Tosi.
1979	Judy Moorcroft	The Europeans	Nominated	
1980	Patricia Norris	The Elephant Man	Nominated	
1980	Anna Senior	My Brilliant Career	Nominated	
1981	Milena Canonero	Chariots of Fire	Won	
1981	Anna Hill Johnstone	Ragtime	Nominated	
1981	Shirley Ann Russell	Reds	Nominated	
1982	Bhanu Athaiya	Gandhi	Won	First woman of color to win and be nominated for Best Costume Design. Shared with John Mollo.
1982	Elois Jenssen; Rosanna Norton	Tron	Nominated	
1982	Patricia Norris	Victor/Victoria	Nominated	
1983	Marik Vos	Fanny and Alexander	Won	
1983	Anne-Marie Marchand	The Return of Martin Guerre	Nominated	
1984	Patricia Norris	2010	Nominated	
1984	Jenny Beavan	The Bostonians	Nominated	Shared with John Bright.
1984	Judy Moorcroft	A Passage to India	Nominated	
1984	Ann Roth	Places in the Heart	Nominated	
1985	Emi Wada	Ran	Won	
1985	Aggie Guerard Rodgers	The Color Purple	Nominated	
1985	Milena Canonero	Out of Africa	Nominated	
1986	Jenny Beavan	A Room with a View	Won	Shared with John Bright.
1986	Anna Anni	Otello	Nominated	Shared with Maurizio Millenotti.
1986	Theadora Van Runkle	Peggy Sue Got Married	Nominated	
1987	Dorothy Jeakins	The Dead	Nominated	
1987	Jenny Beavan	Maurice	Nominated	Shared with John Bright.
1987	Marilyn Vance-Straker	The Untouchables	Nominated	
1988	Deborah Nadoolman	Coming to America	Nominated	
1988	Jane Robinson	A Handful of Dust	Nominated	
1988	Patricia Norris	Sunset	Nominated	
1988	Milena Canonero	Tucker: The Man and His Dream	Nominated	
1989	Phyllis Dalton	Henry V	Won	
1989	Gabriella Pescucci	The Adventures of Baron Munchausen	Nominated	
1989	Elizabeth McBride	Driving Miss Daisy	Nominated	
1990	Franca Squarciapino	Cyrano de Bergerac	Won	
1990	Gloria Gresham	Avalon	Nominated	
1990	Elsa Zamparelli	Dances with Wolves	Nominated	
1990	Milena Canonero	Dick Tracy	Nominated	
1991	Ruth Myers	The Addams Family	Nominated	
1991	Corinne Jorry	Madame Bovary	Nominated	
1992	Eiko Ishioka	Bram Stoker's Dracula	Won	
1992	Sheena Napier	Enchanted April	Nominated	
1992	Jenny Beavan	Howards End	Nominated	Shared with John Bright.
1992	Ruth E. Carter	Malcolm X	Nominated	First African-American and black woman to be nominated for Best Costume Design.
1993 (Note: All five films nominated for Best Costume Design this year featured female costume designers.)	Gabriella Pescucci	The Age of Innocence	Won	
1993	Sandy Powell	Orlando	Nominated	
1993	Janet Patterson	The Piano	Nominated	
1993	Jenny Beavan	The Remains of the Day	Nominated	Shared with John Bright.
1993	Anna B. Sheppard	Schindler's List	Nominated	
1994	Lizzy Gardiner	The Adventures of Priscilla, Queen of the Desert	Won	Shared with Tim Chappel.
1994	Colleen Atwood	Little Women	Nominated	
1994	April Ferry	Maverick	Nominated	
1994	Moidele Bickel	Queen Margot	Nominated	
1995	Julie Weiss	12 Monkeys	Nominated	
1995	Shuna Harwood	Richard III	Nominated	
1995	Jenny Beavan	Sense and Sensibility	Nominated	Shared with John Bright.
1996	Ann Roth	The English Patient	Won	
1996	Ruth Myers	Emma	Nominated	
1996	Alexandra Byrne	Hamlet	Nominated	
1996	Janet Patterson	The Portrait of a Lady	Nominated	
1997	Deborah Lynn Scott	Titanic	Won	
1997	Ruth E. Carter	Amistad	Nominated	First African-American and woman of color with multiple nominations in this category.
1997	Janet Patterson	Oscar and Lucinda	Nominated	
1997	Sandy Powell	The Wings of the Dove	Nominated	
1998	Sandy Powell	Shakespeare in Love	Won	
1998	Colleen Atwood	Beloved	Nominated	
1998	Alexandra Byrne	Elizabeth	Nominated	
1998	Judianna Makovsky	Pleasantville	Nominated	
1998	Sandy Powell	Velvet Goldmine	Nominated	
1999	Lindy Hemming	Topsy-Turvy	Won	
1999	Jenny Beavan	Anna and the King	Nominated	
1999	Colleen Atwood	Sleepy Hollow	Nominated	
1999	Ann Roth	The Talented Mr. Ripley	Nominated	Shared with Gary Jones.
1999	Milena Canonero	Titus	Nominated	
2000	Janty Yates	Gladiator	Won	
2000	Rita Ryack	How the Grinch Stole Christmas	Nominated	
2000	Jacqueline West	Quills	Nominated	
2001	Catherine Martin	Moulin Rouge!	Won	Shared with Angus Strathie.
2001	Milena Canonero	The Affair of the Necklace	Nominated	
2001	Jenny Beavan	Gosford Park	Nominated	
2001	Judianna Makovsky	Harry Potter and the Sorcerer's Stone	Nominated	
2001	Ngila Dickson	The Lord of the Rings: The Fellowship of the Ring	Nominated	Shared with Richard Taylor.
2002	Colleen Atwood	Chicago	Won	
2002	Julie Weiss	Frida	Nominated	
2002	Sandy Powell	Gangs of New York	Nominated	
2002	Ann Roth	The Hours	Nominated	
2002	Anna B. Sheppard	The Pianist	Nominated	
2003	Ngila Dickson	The Lord of the Rings: The Return of the King	Won	Shared with Richard Taylor.
2003	Dien van Straalen	Girl with a Pearl Earring	Nominated	
2003	Ngila Dickson	The Last Samurai	Nominated	
2003	Wendy Stites	Master and Commander: The Far Side of the World	Nominated	
2003	Judianna Makovsky	Seabiscuit	Nominated	
2004	Sandy Powell	The Aviator	Won	
2004	Alexandra Byrne	Finding Neverland	Nominated	
2004	Colleen Atwood	Lemony Snicket's A Series of Unfortunate Events	Nominated	
2004	Sharen Davis	Ray	Nominated	
2005	Colleen Atwood	Memoirs of a Geisha	Won	
2005	Gabriella Pescucci	Charlie and the Chocolate Factory	Nominated	
2005	Sandy Powell	Mrs Henderson Presents	Nominated	
2005	Jacqueline Durran	Pride & Prejudice	Nominated	
2005	Arianne Phillips	Walk the Line	Nominated	
2006	Milena Canonero	Marie Antoinette	Won	
2006	Patricia Field	The Devil Wears Prada	Nominated	
2006	Sharen Davis	Dreamgirls	Nominated	
2006	Consolata Boyle	The Queen	Nominated	
2007	Alexandra Byrne	Elizabeth: The Golden Age	Won	Twelfth consecutive woman to win in this category.
2007	Jacqueline Durran	Atonement	Nominated	
2007	Marit Allen	La Vie en Rose	Nominated	Posthumous nomination.
2007	Colleen Atwood	Sweeney Todd: The Demon Barber of Fleet Street	Nominated	
2008	Catherine Martin	Australia	Nominated	
2008	Jacqueline West	The Curious Case of Benjamin Button	Nominated	
2009	Sandy Powell	The Young Victoria	Won	
2009	Janet Patterson	Bright Star	Nominated	
2009	Catherine Leterrier	Coco Before Chanel	Nominated	
2009	Monique Prudhomme	The Imaginarium of Doctor Parnassus	Nominated	
2009	Colleen Atwood	Nine	Nominated	
2010	Colleen Atwood	Alice in Wonderland	Won	
2010	Antonella Cannarozzi	I Am Love	Nominated	
2010	Jenny Beavan	The King's Speech	Nominated	
2010	Sandy Powell	The Tempest	Nominated	
2010	Mary Zophres	True Grit	Nominated	
2011	Lisy Christl	Anonymous	Nominated	
2011	Sandy Powell	Hugo	Nominated	
2011	Arianne Phillips	W.E.	Nominated	
2012	Jacqueline Durran	Anna Karenina	Won	
2012	Joanna Johnston	Lincoln	Nominated	
2012	Eiko Ishioka	Mirror Mirror	Nominated	Posthumous nomination.
2012	Colleen Atwood	Snow White and the Huntsman	Nominated	
2013	Catherine Martin	The Great Gatsby	Won	
2013	Patricia Norris	12 Years a Slave	Nominated	Holds the record for most nominations without a win in this category, with six.
2014	Milena Canonero	The Grand Budapest Hotel	Won	
2014	Colleen Atwood	Into the Woods	Nominated	
2014	Anna B. Sheppard	Maleficent	Nominated	
2014	Jacqueline Durran	Mr. Turner	Nominated	
2015	Jenny Beavan	Mad Max: Fury Road	Won	
2015	Sandy Powell	Carol	Nominated	
2015	Sandy Powell	Cinderella	Nominated	
2015	Jacqueline West	The Revenant	Nominated	
2016	Colleen Atwood	Fantastic Beasts and Where to Find Them	Won	
2016	Joanna Johnston	Allied	Nominated	
2016	Consolata Boyle	Florence Foster Jenkins	Nominated	
2016	Madeline Fontaine	Jackie	Nominated	
2016	Mary Zophres	La La Land	Nominated	
2017	Jacqueline Durran	Beauty and the Beast	Nominated	
2017	Jacqueline Durran	Darkest Hour	Nominated	
2017	Consolata Boyle	Victoria & Abdul	Nominated	
2018	Ruth E. Carter	Black Panther	Won	First African-American and black woman to win for Best Costume Design.
2018	Mary Zophres	The Ballad of Buster Scruggs	Nominated	
2018	Sandy Powell	The Favourite	Nominated	
2018	Sandy Powell	Mary Poppins Returns	Nominated	
2018	Alexandra Byrne	Mary Queen of Scots	Nominated	
2019	Jacqueline Durran	Little Women	Won	
2019	Sandy Powell	The Irishman	Nominated	Shared with Christopher Peterson.
2019	Mayes C. Rubeo	Jojo Rabbit	Nominated	First Latina to be nominated for Best Costume Design.
2019	Arianne Phillips	Once Upon a Time in Hollywood	Nominated	
2020	Ann Roth	Ma Rainey’s Black Bottom	Won	Oldest woman to win in any category, at age 89.
2020	Alexandra Byrne	Emma	Nominated	
2020	Trish Summerville	Mank	Nominated	
2020	Bina Daigeler	Mulan	Nominated	
2021	Jenny Beavan	Cruella	Won	
2021	Jacqueline Durran	Cyrano	Nominated	Shared with Massimo Cantini Parrini.
2021	Jacqueline West	Dune	Nominated	Shared with Robert Morgan.
2022	Ruth E. Carter	Black Panther: Wakanda Forever	Won	First African-American and woman of color with multiple wins in this category. First Black woman to win multiple Oscars.
2022	Mary Zophres	Babylon	Nominated	
2022	Catherine Martin	Elvis	Nominated	
2022	Shirley Kurata	Everything Everywhere All at Once	Nominated	
2022	Jenny Beavan	Mrs. Harris Goes to Paris	Nominated	
2023	Holly Waddington	Poor Things	Won	
2023	Jacqueline Durran	Barbie	Nominated	
2023	Jacqueline West	Killers of the Flower Moon	Nominated	
2023	Janty Yates	Napoleon	Nominated	Shared with Dave Crossman.
2023	Ellen Mirojnick	Oppenheimer	Nominated	
2024	Arianne Phillips	A Complete Unknown	Nominated	
2024	Lisy Christl	Conclave	Nominated	
2024	Janty Yates	Gladiator II	Nominated	Shared with Dave Crossman.
2024	Linda Muir	Nosferatu	Nominated	
2025	Kate Hawley	Frankenstein	Won	
2025	Deborah Lynn Scott	Avatar: Fire and Ash	Nominated	
2025	Malgosia Turzanska	Hamnet	Nominated	
2025	Miyako Bellizzi	Marty Supreme	Nominated	
2025	Ruth E. Carter	Sinners	Nominated	Holds the record for most nominations by a Black woman in any category, with 5

== Best Director ==
Academy Award for Best Director
Year	Name	Film	Status	Notes
1976	Lina Wertmüller	Seven Beauties	Nominated	First woman to be nominated for Best Director.
1993	Jane Campion	The Piano	Nominated	
2003	Sofia Coppola	Lost in Translation	Nominated	
2009	Kathryn Bigelow	The Hurt Locker	Won	First woman to win for Best Director.
2017	Greta Gerwig	Lady Bird	Nominated	
2020	Chloé Zhao	Nomadland	Won	First woman of color to win and be nominated for Best Director.
2020	Emerald Fennell	Promising Young Woman	Nominated	
2021	Jane Campion	The Power of the Dog	Won	First woman with multiple nominations in this category.
2023	Justine Triet	Anatomy of a Fall	Nominated	
2024	Coralie Fargeat	The Substance	Nominated	
2025	Chloé Zhao	Hamnet	Nominated	First woman of color with multiple nominations in this category.

== Best Documentary Film (Feature) ==
Academy Award for Best Documentary Feature Film
Year	Name	Film	Status	Notes
1948	Janice Loeb	The Quiet One	Nominated	First woman to be nominated for Best Documentary Feature Film.
1955	Nancy Hamilton	Helen Keller in Her Story	Won	First woman to win for Best Documentary Feature Film.
1972	Sarah Kernochan	Marjoe	Won	Shared with Howard Smith.
1973	Gertrude Ross Marks	Walls of Fire	Nominated	Shared with Edmund F. Penney.
1974	Judy Collins; Jill Godmilow	Antonia: A Portrait of the Woman	Nominated	
1974	Natalie R. Jones	The Wild and the Brave	Nominated	Shared with Eugene S. Jones.
1975	Shirley MacLaine	The Other Half of the Sky: A China Memoir	Nominated	
1976	Barbara Kopple	Harlan County, U.S.A.	Won	
1977	Julia Reichert	Union Maids	Nominated	Shared with Jim Klein and Miles Mogulescu.
1978	Joan Root	Mysterious Castles of Clay	Nominated	Shared with Alan Root.
1978	Anne Bohlen; Lyn Goldfarb; Lorraine Gray	With Babies and Banners: Story of the Women's Emergency Brigade	Nominated	
1981	Suzanne Bauman	Against Wind and Tide: A Cuban Odyssey	Nominated	Shared with Paul Neshamkin and Jim Burroughs.
1981	Mary Benjamin; Susanne Simpson	Eight Minutes to Midnight: A Portrait of Dr. Helen Caldicott	Nominated	Shared with Boyd Estus.
1981	Tete Vasconcellos	El Salvador: Another Vietnam	Nominated	First Latina to be nominated for Best Documentary Feature Film. Shared with Glenn Silber.
1982	Meg Switzgable	In Our Water	Nominated	
1983	Robin Anderson	First Contact	Nominated	Shared with Bob Connolly.
1983	Tina Viljoen	The Profession of Arms	Nominated	Shared with Michael Bryans.
1983	Julia Reichert	Seeing Red	Nominated	First woman with multiple nominations in this category. Shared with James Klein.
1984	Nancy Sloss	High Schools	Nominated	Shared with Charles Guggenheim.
1984	Cheryl McCall	Streetwise	Nominated	
1985	Maria Florio; Victoria Mudd	Broken Rainbow	Won	
1985	Susana Blaustein Muñoz; Lourdes Portillo	The Mothers of Plaza de Mayo	Nominated	
1986 (Note: A tie in voting this year resulted in multiple winners.)	Brigitte Berman	Artie Shaw: Time Is All You've Got	Won	Tied with Joseph Feury and Milton Justice for Down and Out in America, which was also directed by a woman, Lee Grant. Despite that, Grant didn't share the award personally because, under the Academy rules at the time, only credited producers were accepted for nomination in this category. Nevertheless, according to the revised rules, the credited director must be named as a nominee alongside the producers.
1986	Sharon I. Sopher	Witness to Apartheid	Nominated	
1987	Aviva Slesin	The Ten-Year Lunch: The Wit and Legend of the Algonquin Round Table	Won	
1987	Callie Crossley	Eyes on the Prize: America's Civil Rights Years	Nominated	First African-American and woman of color to be nominated for Best Documentary Feature Film. Shared with James A. DeVinney.
1987	Barbara Herbich	A Stitch for Time	Nominated	Shared with Cyril Christo.
1988	Nan Bush	Let's Get Lost	Nominated	Shared with Bruce Weber.
1988	Ginny Durrin	Promises to Keep	Nominated	
1988	Renee Tajima-Peña; Christine Choy	Who Killed Vincent Chin?	Nominated	
1989	Yvonne Smith	Adam Clayton Powell	Nominated	Shared with Richard Kilberg.
1989	Betsy Broyles Breier	For All Mankind	Nominated	Shared with Al Reinert.
1989	Judith Leonard	Super Chief: The Life and Legacy of Earl Warren	Nominated	Shared with Bill Jersey.
1990	Barbara Kopple	American Dream	Won	First woman with multiple wins in this category. Shared with Arthur Cohn.
1990	Susan Robinson	Building Bombs	Nominated	Shared with Mark Mori.
1990	Judith Montell	Forever Activists: Stories from the Veterans of the Abraham Lincoln Brigade	Nominated	
1991	Allie Light	In the Shadow of the Stars	Won	Shared with Irving Saraf.
1991	Susan Raymond	Doing Time: Life Inside the Big House	Nominated	Shared with Alan Raymond.
1991	Hava Kohav Beller	The Restless Conscience: Resistance to Hitler Within Germany 1933-1945	Nominated	
1991	Diane Garey	Wild by Law	Nominated	Shared with Lawrence Hott.
1992	Barbara Trent	The Panama Deception	Won	Shared with David Kasper.
1992	Sally Dundas	Fires of Kuwait	Nominated	
1992	Nina Rosenblum	Liberators: Fighting on Two Fronts in World War II	Nominated	Shared with Bill Miles.
1992	Margaret Smilow; Roma Baran	Music for the Movies: Bernard Herrmann	Nominated	
1993	Susan Raymond	I Am a Promise: The Children of Stanton Elementary School	Won	Shared with Alan Raymond.
1993	Susan Todd	Children of Fate	Nominated	Shared with Andrew Young.
1993	Betsy Thompson	For Better or For Worse	Nominated	Shared with David Collier.
1993	Chris Hegedus	The War Room	Nominated	Shared with D. A. Pennebaker.
1994	Freida Lee Mock	Maya Lin: A Strong Clear Vision	Won	First woman of color to win for Best Documentary Feature Film. First woman and woman of color to be nominated in both documentary categories (For the further information, see Best Documentary Short Film).
1994	Deborah Hoffmann	Complaints of a Dutiful Daughter	Nominated	
1994	Connie Field; Marilyn Mulford	Freedom on My Mind	Nominated	
1994	Jean Bach	A Great Day in Harlem	Nominated	
1995	Jeanne Jordan	Troublesome Creek: A Midwestern	Nominated	Shared with Steven Ascher.
1996	Susan W. Dryfoos	The Line King: The Al Hirschfeld Story	Nominated	
1996	Anne Belle; Deborah Dickson	Suzanne Farrell: Elusive Muse	Nominated	
1997	Michèle Ohayon; Julia Schachter	Colors Straight Up	Nominated	
1998	Liz Garbus	The Farm: Angola, U.S.A.	Nominated	Shared with Jonathan Stack.
1998	Barbara Sonneborn; Janet Cole	Regret to Inform	Nominated	
1999	Nanette Burstein	On the Ropes	Nominated	Shared with Brett Morgen.
1999	Paola di Florio; Lilibet Foster	Speaking in Strings	Nominated	
2000	Deborah Oppenheimer	Into the Arms of Strangers: Stories of the Kindertransport	Won	Shared with Mark Jonathan Harris.
2000	Deborah Hoffmann; Frances Reid	Long Night's Journey into Day	Nominated	
2001	Edet Belzberg	Children Underground	Nominated	
2001	Deborah Dickson; Susan Froemke	LaLee's Kin: The Legacy of Cotton	Nominated	
2001	Justine Shapiro	Promises	Nominated	Shared with B.Z. Goldberg.
2002	Gail Dolgin	Daughter from Danang	Nominated	Shared with Vicente Franco.
2003	Susan R. Behr	My Architect	Nominated	Shared with Nathaniel Kahn.
2004	Zana Briski	Born into Brothels	Won	Shared with Ross Kauffman.
2004	Byambasuren Davaa	The Story of the Weeping Camel	Nominated	Shared with Luigi Falorni.
2004	Karolyn Ali; Lauren Lazin	Tupac: Resurrection	Nominated	
2006	Amy Berg	Deliver Us from Evil	Nominated	Shared with Frank Donner.
2006	Heidi Ewing; Rachel Grady	Jesus Camp	Nominated	
2006	Jocelyn Glatzer; Laura Poitras	My Country, My Country	Nominated}	
2007	Eva Orner	Taxi to the Dark Side	Won	Shared with Alex Gibney.
2007	Audrey Marrs	No End in Sight	Nominated	Shared with Charles Ferguson.
2007	Meghan O'Hara	Sicko	Nominated	Shared with Michael Moore.
2007	Andrea Nix Fine	War/Dance	Nominated	Shared with Sean Fine.
2008	Ellen Kuras	The Betrayal (Nerakhoon)	Nominated	Shared with Thavisouk Phrasavath.
2008	Tia Lessin	Trouble the Water	Nominated	Shared with Carl Deal.
2009	Lise Lense-Møller	Burma VJ	Nominated	Shared with Anders Østergaard.
2009	Elise Pearlstein	Food, Inc.	Nominated	Shared with Robert Kenner.
2009	Judith Ehrlich	The Most Dangerous Man in America: Daniel Ellsberg and the Pentagon Papers	Nominated	Shared with Rick Goldsmith.
2009	Rebecca Cammisa	Which Way Home	Nominated	
2010	Audrey Marrs	Inside Job	Won	Shared with Charles Ferguson.
2010	Trish Adlesic	Gasland	Nominated	Shared with Josh Fox.
2010	Lucy Walker	Waste Land	Nominated	Shared with Angus Aynsley.
2012	Philippa Kowarsky; Estelle Fialon	The Gatekeepers	Nominated	Shared with Dror Moreh.
2012	Amy Ziering	The Invisible War	Nominated	Shared with Kirby Dick.
2013	Caitrin Rogers	20 Feet from Stardom	Won	Shared with Morgan Neville and Gil Friesen.
2013	Signe Byrge Sorensen	The Act of Killing	Nominated	Shared with Joshua Oppenheimer.
2013	Lydia Dean Pilcher	Cutie and the Boxer	Nominated	Shared with Zachary Heinzerling.
2013	Jehane Noujaim	The Square	Nominated	Shared with Karim Amer.
2014	Laura Poitras; Mathilde Bonnefoy	Citizenfour	Won	Shared with Dirk Wilutzky.
2014	Rory Kennedy	Last Days in Vietnam	Nominated	Shared with Kevin McAlester.
2014	Joanna Natasegara	Virunga	Nominated	Shared with Orlando von Einsiedel.
2015	Signe Byrge Sorensen	The Look of Silence	Nominated	Shared with Joshua Oppenheimer.
2015	Liz Garbus; Amy Hobby	What Happened, Miss Simone?	Nominated	Shared with Justin Wilkes.
2016	Caroline Waterlow	O.J.: Made in America	Won	Shared with Ezra Edelman.
2016	Donatella Palermo	Fire at Sea	Nominated	Shared with Gianfranco Rosi.
2016	Julie Goldman	Life, Animated	Nominated	Shared with Roger Ross Williams.
2016	Ava DuVernay	13th	Nominated	Shared with Spencer Averick and Howard Barish.
2017	Julie Goldman	Abacus: Small Enough to Jail	Nominated	Shared with Steve James and Mark Mitten.
2017	Agnès Varda; Rosalie Varda	Faces Places	Nominated	Shared with JR.
2017	Joslyn Barnes	Strong Island	Nominated	Shared with Yance Ford.
2018 (Note: All five films nominated for Best Documentary Feature Film this year featured female nominees.)	Elizabeth Chai Vasarhelyi; Shannon Dill	Free Solo	Won	Shared with Jimmy Chin and Evan Hayes.
2018	Joslyn Barnes; Su Kim	Hale County This Morning, This Evening	Nominated	Shared with RaMell Ross.
2018	Diane Quon	Minding the Gap	Nominated	Shared with Bing Liu.
2018	Eva Kemme	Of Fathers and Sons	Nominated	Shared with Talal Derki, Ansgar Frerich, and Tobias N. Siebert.
2018	Betsy West; Julie Cohen	RBG	Nominated	
2019	Julia Reichert	American Factory	Won	Shared with Steven Bognar and Jeff Reichert.
2019	Kirstine Barfod; Sigrid Dyekjær	The Cave	Nominated	Shared with Feras Fayyad.
2019	Petra Costa; Joanna Natasegara	The Edge of Democracy	Nominated	Shared with Shane Boris and Tiago Pavan.
2019	Waad Al-Kateab	For Sama	Nominated	Shared with Edward Watts.
2019	Tamara Kotevska	Honeyland	Nominated	Shared with Ljubomir Stefanov and Atanas Georgiev.
2020	Pippa Ehrlich	My Octopus Teacher	Won	Shared with James Reed and Craig Foster.
2020	Bianca Oana	Collective	Nominated	Shared with Alexander Nanau.
2020	Nicole Newnham; Sara Bolder	Crip Camp	Nominated	Shared with Jim LeBrecht.
2020	Maite Alberdi; Marcela Santibáñez	The Mole Agent	Nominated	
2020	Garrett Bradley; Lauren Domino	Time	Nominated	Shared with Kellen Quinn.
2021	Jessica Kingdon; Kira Simon-Kennedy	Ascension	Nominated	Shared with Nathan Truesdell.
2021	Traci A. Curry	Attica	Nominated	Shared with Stanley Nelson.
2021	Monica Hellström; Signe Byrge Sørensen; Charlotte de la Gournerie	Flee	Nominated	Shared with Jonas Poher Rasmussen. First animated documentary to be nominated in this category.
2021	Rintu Thomas	Writing with Fire	Nominated	Shared with Sushmit Ghosh.
2022	Odessa Rae; Diane Becker; Melanie Miller	Navalny	Won	Shared with Daniel Roher and Shane Boris.
2022	Laura Poitras; Nan Goldin	All the Beauty and the Bloodshed	Nominated	Shared with Howard Gertler, John Lyons, and Yoni Golijov.
2022	Sara Dosa; Ina Fichman	Fire of Love	Nominated	Shared with Shane Boris.
2022	Monica Hellström	A House Made of Splinters	Nominated	Shared with Simon Lereng Wilmont.
2023	Michelle Mizner; Raney Aronson-Rath	20 Days in Mariupol	Won	Shared with Mstyslav Chernov.
2023	Maite Alberdi	The Eternal Memory	Nominated	
2023	Kaouther Ben Hania	Four Daughters	Nominated	Shared with Nadim Cheikhrouha.
2023	Nisha Pahuja; Cornelia Principe	To Kill a Tiger	Nominated	Shared with David Oppenheim.
2024	Rachel Szor	No Other Land	Won	Shared with Basel Adra, Hamdan Ballal and Yuval Abraham.
2024	Shiori Itō; Hanna Aqvilin	Black Box Diaries	Nominated	Shared with Eric Nyari.
2024	Aniela Sidorska; Paula DuPré Pesmen	Porcelain War	Nominated	Shared with Brendan Bellomo and Slava Leontyev.
2024	Emily Kassie	Sugarcane	Nominated	Shared with Julian Brave NoiseCat and Kellen Quinn.
2025	Helle Faber; Alžběta Karásková	Mr Nobody Against Putin	Won	Shared with David Borenstein and Pavel Talankin.
2025	Charlotte Kaufman	The Alabama Solution	Nominated	Shared with Andrew Jarecki.
2025	Jessica Hargrave; Tig Notaro; Stef Willen	Come See Me in the Good Light	Nominated	Shared with Ryan White.
2025	Sara Khaki	Cutting Through Rocks	Nominated	Shared with Mohammadreza Eyni.
2025	Geeta Gandbhir; Alisa Payne	The Perfect Neighbor	Nominated	Shared with Nikon Kwantu and Sam Bisbee. Gandbhir is the first woman to be nominated in both documentary categories in the same year (For the further information, see Best Documentary Short Film).

== Best Documentary Film (Short) ==
Academy Award for Best Documentary Short Film
Year	Name	Film	Status	Notes
1960	Altina Schinasi	George Grosz' Interregnum	Nominated	First woman to be nominated for Best Documentary Short Film. Shared with Charles Carey.
1966	Helen Kristt Radin	The Odds Against	Nominated	Shared with Lee R. Bobker.
1969	Joan Horvath	Jenny Is a Good Thing	Nominated	
1969	Joan Keller Stern	The Magic Machines	Nominated	
1970	Vivien Carey	Oisin	Nominated	Shared with Patrick Carey.
1972	Martina Huguenot van der Linden	This Tiny World	Won	First woman to win for Best Documentary Short Film. Shared with Charles Huguenot van der Linden.
1973	June Wayne	Four Stones for Kanemitsu	Nominated	Shared with Terry Sanders.
1974	Lesley Foster	John Muir's High Sierra	Nominated	Shared with Dewitt Jones.
1975	Claire Wilbur	The End of the Game	Won	Shared with Robin Lehman.
1975	Kristine Samuelson	Arthur and Lillie	Nominated	Shared with Jon Else and Steven Kovacs.
1976	Lynne Littman; Barbara Myerhoff	Number Our Days	Won	
1977	Helen Whitney	First Edition	Nominated	Shared with DeWitt L. Sage Jr.
1978	Jacqueline Phillips Shedd	The Flight of the Gossamer Condor	Won	Shared with Ben Shedd.
1981	Linda Chapman; Pam LeBlanc; Freddi Stevens	See What I Say	Nominated	
1982	Terre Nash	If You Love This Planet	Won	Shared with Edward Le Lorrain.
1982	Freida Lee Mock	To Live or Let Die	Nominated	First woman of color to be nominated for Best Documentary Short Film. First woman and woman of color to be nominated in both documentary categories (For further information, see Best Documentary Feature Film).
1983	Cynthia Scott	Flamenco at 5:15	Won	Shared with Adam Symansky.
1983	Vivienne Verdon-Roe	In the Nuclear Shadow: What Can the Children Tell Us?	Nominated	Shared with Eric Thiermann.
1983	Dea Brokman; Ilene Landis	You Are Free (Ihr Zent Frei)	Nominated	
1984	Marjorie Hunt	The Stone Carvers	Won	Shared with Paul Wagner.
1984	Joan Sawyer	Code Gray: Ethical Dilemmas in Nursing	Nominated	Shared with Ben Achtenberg.
1984	Irina Kalinina	Recollections of Pavlovsk	Nominated	
1985	Barbara Willis Sweete	Making Overtures: The Story of a Community Orchestra	Nominated	
1986	Vivienne Verdon-Roe	Women – for America, for the World	Won	First woman with multiple nominations in this category.
1986	Alison Nigh-Strelich	Debonair Dancers	Nominated	
1986	Sonya Friedman	The Masters of Disaster	Nominated	
1986	Madeline Bell	Red Grooms: Sunflower in a Hothouse	Nominated	Shared with Thomas L. Neff.
1987	Sue Marx; Pamela Conn	Young at Heart	Won	
1987	Deborah Dickson	Frances Steloff: Memoirs of a Bookseller	Nominated	
1987	Megan Williams	Language Says It All	Nominated	
1987	Lynn Mueller	Silver into Gold	Nominated	
1988	Karen Goodman	The Children's Storefront	Nominated	
1988	Lise Yasui; Ann Tegnell	Family Gathering	Nominated	
1988	Nancy Hale; Meg Partridge	Portrait of Imogen	Nominated	
1990	Karen Goodman	Chimps: So Like Us	Nominated	Shared with Kirk Simon.
1990	Freida Lee Mock	Rose Kennedy: A Life to Remember	Nominated	First woman of color with multiple nominations in this category. Shared with Terry Sanders.
1991	Debra Chasnoff	Deadly Deception: General Electric, Nuclear Weapons and Our Environment	Won	
1991	Immy Humes	A Little Vicious	Nominated	
1992	Gerardine Wurzburg	Educating Peter	Won	Shared with Thomas C. Goodwin (p. a.)
1992	Wendy L. Weinberg	Beyond Imagining: Margaret Anderson and the 'Little Review'	Nominated	
1992	Sally Bochner	The Colours of My Father: A Portrait of Sam Borenstein	Nominated	Shared with Richard Elson.
1992	Dorothy Fadiman	When Abortion Was Illegal: Untold Stories	Nominated	
1993	Margaret Lazarus	Defending Our Lives	Won	Shared with Renner Wunderlich.
1993	Elaine Holliman	Chicks in White Satin	Nominated	Shared with Jason Schneider.
1994	Dee Mosbacher; Frances Reid	Straight from the Heart	Nominated	
1995	Nancy Dine	Jim Dine: A Self-Portrait on the Walls	Nominated	Shared with Richard Stilwell.
1995	Freida Lee Mock	Never Give Up: The 20th Century Odyssey of Herbert Zipper	Nominated	Shared with Terry Sanders.
1996	Jessica Yu	Breathing Lessons: The Life and Work of Mark O'Brien	Won	First woman of color to win for Best Documentary Short Film.
1996	Susanne Simpson	Special Effects: Anything Can Happen	Nominated	Shared with Ben Burtt.
1997	Donna Dewey; Carol Pasternak	A Story of Healing	Won	
1997	Terri Randall	Family Video Diaries: Daughter of the Bride	Nominated	
1997	Andrea Blaugrund	Still Kicking: The Fabulous Palm Springs Follies	Nominated	Shared with Mel Damski.
1998	Keiko Ibi	The Personals: Improvisations on Romance in the Golden Years	Won	
1999	Susan Hannah Hadary	King Gimp	Won	Shared with William A. Whiteford.
2000	Tracy Seretean	Big Mama	Won	
2001 (Note: All films nominated for Best Documentary Short Film this year featured female nominees (on each occasion in a year with less than five films nominated).)	Sarah Kernochan; Lynn Appelle	Thoth	Won	
2001	Lianne Klapper McNally	Artists and Orphans: A True Drama	Nominated	
2001	Freida Lee Mock; Jessica Sanders	Sing!	Nominated	Mock holds the record for most nominations without a win in this category, with four.
2002	Alice Elliott	The Collector of Bedford Street	Nominated	
2003	Maryann DeLeo	Chernobyl Heart	Won	
2003	Sandy McLeod; Gini Reticker	Asylum	Nominated	
2003	Katja Esson	Ferry Tales	Nominated	
2004	Gerardine Wurzburg	Autism Is a World	Nominated	
2004	Hanna Polak	The Children of Leningradsky	Nominated	Shared with Andrzej Celinski.
2004	Erin Faith Young	Hardwood	Nominated	Shared with Hubert Davis.
2005	Corinne Marrinan	A Note of Triumph: The Golden Age of Norman Corwin	Won	Shared with Eric Simonson.
2005	Kimberlee Acquaro; Stacy Sherman	God Sleeps in Rwanda	Nominated	
2006	Ruby Yang	The Blood of Yingzhou District	Won	Shared with Thomas Lennon.
2006	Leslie Iwerks	Recycled Life	Nominated	Shared with Mike Glad.
2006	Karen Goodman	Rehearsing a Dream	Nominated	Shared with Kirk Simon.
2006	Susan Rose Behr	Two Hands	Nominated	Shared with Nathaniel Kahn.
2007	Cynthia Wade; Vanessa Roth	Freeheld	Won	
2007	Amanda Micheli; Isabel Vega	La Corona	Nominated	
2008	Megan Mylan	Smile Pinki	Won	
2008	Irene Taylor Brodsky	The Final Inch	Nominated	Shared with Tom Grant.
2008	Margaret Hyde	The Witness: From the Balcony of Room 306	Nominated	Shared with Adam Pertofsky.
2009	Elinor Burkett	Music by Prudence	Won	Shared with Roger Ross Williams.
2009	Julia Reichert	The Last Truck: Closing of a GM Plant	Nominated	Shared with Steven Bognar.
2009	Anna Wydra	Rabbit à la Berlin	Nominated	Shared with Bartek Konopka.
2010	Karen Goodman	Strangers No More	Won	Shared with Kirk Simon.
2010	Sara Nesson	Poster Girl	Nominated	Shared with Mitchell Block.
2010	Jennifer Redfearn	Sun Come Up	Nominated	Shared with Tim Metzger.
2010	Ruby Yang	The Warriors of Qiugang	Nominated	Shared with Thomas Lennon.
2011	Sharmeen Obaid-Chinoy	Saving Face	Won	Shared with Daniel Junge.
2011	Robin Fryday; Gail Dolgin	The Barber of Birmingham: Foot Soldier of the Civil Rights Movement	Nominated	Posthumous nomination for Dolgin.
2011	Rebecca Cammisa; Julie Anderson	God Is the Bigger Elvis	Nominated	
2011	Lucy Walker; Kira Carstensen	The Tsunami and the Cherry Blossom	Nominated	
2012	Andrea Nix Fine	Inocente	Won	Shared with Sean Fine.
2012	Sari Gilman	Kings Point	Nominated	Shared with Jedd Wider.
2012	Cynthia Wade; Robin Honan	Mondays at Racine	Nominated	
2012	Cori Shepherd Stern	Open Heart	Nominated	Shared with Kief Davidson.
2013	Sara Ishaq	Karama Has No Walls	Nominated	
2014	Ellen Goosenberg Kent; Dana Perry	Crisis Hotline: Veterans Press 1	Won	
2014	Aneta Kopacz	Joanna	Nominated	
2015	Sharmeen Obaid-Chinoy	A Girl in the River: The Price of Forgiveness	Won	First woman and woman of color with multiple wins in this category.
2015	Courtney Marsh	Chau, Beyond the Lines	Nominated	Shared with Jerry Franck.
2015	Dee Hibbert-Jones; Nomi Talisman	Last Day of Freedom	Nominated	
2016	Joanna Natasegara	The White Helmets	Won	Shared with Orlando von Einsiedel.
2016	Daphne Matziaraki	4.1 Miles	Nominated	
2016	Kahane Cooperman; Raphaela Neihausen	Joe's Violin	Nominated	
2017	Laura Checkoway	Edith+Eddie	Nominated	Shared with Thomas Lee Wright.
2017	Elaine McMillion Sheldon	Heroin(e)	Nominated	Shared with Kerrin Sheldon.
2017	Kate Davis	Traffic Stop	Nominated	Shared with David Heilbroner.
2018	Rayka Zehtabchi; Melissa Berton	Period. End of Sentence.	Won	
2019	Carol Dysinger; Elena Andreicheva	Learning to Skateboard in a Warzone (If You're a Girl)	Won	
2019	Kristine Samuelson	Life Overtakes Me	Nominated	Shared with John Haptas.
2019	Smriti Mundhra	St. Louis Superman	Nominated	Shared with Sami Khan.
2019	Laura Nix; Colette Sandstedt	Walk Run Cha-Cha	Nominated	
2020	Alice Doyard	Colette	Won	Shared with Anthony Giacchino.
2020	Charlotte Cook	Do Not Split	Nominated	Shared with Anders Hammer.
2020	Sophia Nahli Allison; Janice Duncan	A Love Song for Latasha	Nominated	First Black women to be nominated for Best Documentary Short Film.
2021	Elizabeth Mirzaei	Three Songs for Benazir	Nominated	Shared with Gulistan Mirzaei
2022	Kartiki Gonsalves; Guneet Monga	The Elephant Whisperers	Won	
2022	Evgenia Arbugaeva	Haulout	Nominated	Shared with Maxim Arbugaev.
2022	Anne Alvergue; Beth Levison	The Martha Mitchell Effect	Nominated	
2023	Sheila Nevins; Trish Adlesic	The ABCs of Book Banning	Nominated	
2023	Christine Turner	The Barber of Little Rock	Nominated	Shared with John Hoffman.
2023	Jean Tsien	Island in Between	Nominated	Shared with S. Leo Chiang.
2024	Molly O’Brien; Lisa Remington	The Only Girl in the Orchestra	Won	
2024	Kim A. Snyder; Janique L. Robillard	Death by Numbers	Nominated	
2024	Smriti Mundhra; Maya Gnyp	I Am Ready, Warden	Nominated	
2024	Ema Ryan Yamazaki	Instruments of a Beating Heart	Nominated	Shared with Eric Nyari.
2025	Hilla Medalia; Sheila Nevins	Children No More: "Were and Are Gone"	Nominated	
2025	Christalyn Hampton; Geeta Gandbhir	The Devil Is Busy	Nominated	Gandbhir is the first woman to be nominated in both documentary categories in the same year (For the further information, see Best Documentary Feature Film).
2025	Alison McAlpine	Perfectly a Strangeness	Nominated	

== Best Film Editing ==
Academy Award for Best Film Editing
Year	Name	Film	Status	Notes
1934	Anne Bauchens	Cleopatra	Nominated	First woman to be nominated for Best Film Editing. Among the inaugural nominees in this category.
1935	Barbara McLean	Les Misérables	Nominated	
1935	Margaret Booth	Mutiny on the Bounty	Nominated	
1936	Barbara McLean	Lloyd's of London	Nominated	First woman with multiple nominations in this category.
1938	Barbara McLean	Alexander's Ragtime Band	Nominated	
1939	Barbara McLean	The Rains Came	Nominated	
1939	Dorothy Spencer	Stagecoach	Nominated	Shared with Otho Lovering.
1940	Anne Bauchens	North West Mounted Police	Won	First woman to win for Best Film Editing.
1943	Barbara McLean	The Song of Bernadette	Nominated	
1944	Barbara McLean	Wilson	Won	
1947	Monica Collingwood	The Bishop's Wife	Nominated	
1950	Barbara McLean	All About Eve	Nominated	
1951	Adrienne Fazan	An American in Paris	Nominated	
1951	Dorothy Spencer	Decision Before Dawn	Nominated	
1952	Anne Bauchens	The Greatest Show on Earth	Nominated	
1955	Alma Macrorie	The Bridges at Toko-Ri	Nominated	
1956	Anne Bauchens	The Ten Commandments	Nominated	
1957	Viola Lawrence	Pal Joey	Nominated	Shared with Jerome Thoms.
1958	Adrienne Fazan	Gigi	Won	
1960	Viola Lawrence	Pepe	Nominated	Shared with Al Clark.
1962	Anne V. Coates	Lawrence of Arabia	Won	
1963	Dorothy Spencer	Cleopatra	Nominated	
1964	Anne V. Coates	Becket	Nominated	
1967	Marjorie Fowler	Doctor Dolittle	Nominated	Shared with Samuel E. Beetley.
1968	Eve Newman	Wild in the Streets	Nominated	Shared with Fred R. Feitshans Jr.
1969	Françoise Bonnot	Z	Won	First foreign language film to win and be nominated in this category.
1970	Thelma Schoonmaker	Woodstock	Nominated	First documentary to be nominated in this category.
1973	Verna Fields; Marcia Lucas	American Graffiti	Nominated	
1974	Dorothy Spencer	Earthquake	Nominated	
1975	Verna Fields	Jaws	Won	
1975	Dede Allen	Dog Day Afternoon	Nominated	
1975	Lynzee Klingman	One Flew Over the Cuckoo's Nest	Nominated	Shared with Richard Chew and Sheldon Kahn.
1976	Eve Newman	Two-Minute Warning	Nominated	Shared with Walter Hannemann.
1977	Marcia Lucas	Star Wars	Won	Shared with Paul Hirsch and Richard Chew.
1979	Lisa Fruchtman	Apocalypse Now	Nominated	Shared with Richard Marks, Walter Murch, and Gerald B. Greenberg.
1980	Thelma Schoonmaker	Raging Bull	Won	
1980	Anne V. Coates	The Elephant Man	Nominated	
1981	Dede Allen	Reds	Nominated	Shared with Craig McKay.
1982	Carol Littleton	E.T. the Extra-Terrestrial	Nominated	
1983	Lisa Fruchtman	The Right Stuff	Won	Shared with Glenn Farr, Stephen A. Rotter, Douglas Stewart, and Tom Rolf.
1984	Nena Danevic	Amadeus	Nominated	Shared with Michael Chandler.
1985	Kaja Fehr	Prizzi's Honor	Nominated	Shared with Rudi Fehr.
1986	Claire Simpson	Platoon	Won	
1986	Susan E. Morse	Hannah and Her Sisters	Nominated	
1987	Gabriella Cristiani	The Last Emperor	Won	
1989	Noëlle Boisson	The Bear	Nominated	
1990	Lisa Fruchtman	The Godfather Part III	Nominated	Shared with Barry Malkin and Walter Murch.
1990	Thelma Schoonmaker	Goodfellas	Nominated	
1992	Geraldine Peroni	The Player	Nominated	
1993	Anne V. Coates	In the Line of Fire	Nominated	
1993	Veronika Jenet	The Piano	Nominated	
1994	Sally Menke	Pulp Fiction	Nominated	
1996	Pip Karmel	Shine	Nominated	
1998	Simona Paggi	Life is Beautiful	Nominated	
1998	Anne V. Coates	Out of Sight	Nominated	
1998	Leslie Jones	The Thin Red Line	Nominated	Shared with Billy Weber and Saar Klein.
1999	Lisa Zeno Churgin	The Cider House Rules	Nominated	
2000	Dede Allen	Wonder Boys	Nominated	
2001	Dody Dorn	Memento	Nominated	
2001	Jill Bilcock	Moulin Rouge!	Nominated	
2002	Thelma Schoonmaker	Gangs of New York	Nominated	
2004	Thelma Schoonmaker	The Aviator	Won	First woman with multiple wins in this category.
2005	Claire Simpson	The Constant Gardener	Nominated	
2006	Thelma Schoonmaker	The Departed	Won	Tied the record for most wins in this category, with three.
2006	Clare Douglas	United 93	Nominated	Shared with Richard Pearson and Christopher Rouse.
2007	Juliette Welfling	The Diving Bell and the Butterfly	Nominated	
2009	Chris Innis	The Hurt Locker	Won	Shared with Bob Murawski.
2009	Sally Menke	Inglourious Basterds	Nominated	
2010	Pamela Martin	The Fighter	Nominated	
2011	Anne-Sophie Bion	The Artist	Nominated	Shared with Michel Hazanavicius.
2011	Thelma Schoonmaker	Hugo	Nominated	
2014	Sandra Adair	Boyhood	Nominated	
2015	Margaret Sixel	Mad Max: Fury Road	Won	
2015	Maryann Brandon; Mary Jo Markey	Star Wars: The Force Awakens	Nominated	
2016	Joi McMillon	Moonlight	Nominated	First Black woman and woman of color to be nominated for Best Film Editing. Shared with Nat Sanders.
2017	Tatiana S. Riegel	I, Tonya	Nominated	
2019	Thelma Schoonmaker	The Irishman	Nominated	
2020	Chloé Zhao	Nomadland	Nominated	
2021	Pamela Martin	King Richard	Nominated	
2022	Monika Willi	Tár	Nominated	
2023	Jennifer Lame	Oppenheimer	Won	
2023	Thelma Schoonmaker	Killers of the Flower Moon	Nominated	Holds the record for most nominations in this category, with nine.
2024	Juliette Welfling	Emilia Pérez	Nominated	

== Best International Feature Film ==
The Academy Award for Best International Feature Film is awarded to countries rather than filmmakers. This list contains female directors of nominated films who typically accept the award on behalf of their country.

Academy Award for Best International Feature Film
Year	Name	Film	Country	Status	Notes
1959	Astrid Henning-Jensen	Paw	(Denmark)	Nominated	First woman to direct a film to be nominated for Best International Feature Film.
1976	Lina Wertmüller	Seven Beauties	(Italy)	Nominated	
1983	Diane Kurys	Entre Nous	(France)	Nominated	
1984	María Luisa Bemberg	Camila	(Argentina)	Nominated	First Latina to direct a film to be nominated for Best International Feature Film.
1985 (Note: The first year to have multiple female-directed films compete in this category.)	Agnieszka Holland	Angry Harvest	(West Germany)	Nominated	
1985	Coline Serreau	Three Men and a Cradle	(France)	Nominated	
1988	Mira Nair	Salaam Bombay!	(India)	Nominated	First woman of color to direct a film to be nominated for Best International Feature Film.
1995	Marleen Gorris	Antonia's Line	(Netherlands)	Won	First woman to direct a film to win for Best International Feature Film.
1996	Nana Jorjadze	A Chef in Love	(Georgia (country))	Nominated	
1996	Berit Nesheim	The Other Side of Sunday	(Norway)	Nominated	
1997	Caroline Link	Beyond Silence	(Germany)	Nominated	
2000	Agnès Jaoui	The Taste of Others	(France)	Nominated	
2002	Caroline Link	Nowhere in Africa	(Germany)	Won	First woman to direct multiple films nominated in this category.
2002	Paula van der Oest	Zus & Zo	(Netherlands)	Nominated	
2005	Cristina Comencini	The Beast in the Heart	(Italy)	Nominated	
2006	Susanne Bier	After the Wedding	(Denmark)	Nominated	
2006	Deepa Mehta	Water	(Canada)	Nominated	
2009	Claudia Llosa	The Milk of Sorrow	(Peru)	Nominated	
2010	Susanne Bier	In a Better World	(Denmark)	Won	
2011	Agnieszka Holland	In Darkness	(Poland)	Nominated	First woman to direct multiple films nominated in this category, each representing a different country.
2015	Deniz Gamze Ergüven	Mustang	(France)	Nominated	
2016	Maren Ade	Toni Erdmann	(Germany)	Nominated	
2017	Ildikó Enyedi	On Body and Soul	(Hungary)	Nominated	
2018	Nadine Labaki	Capernaum	(Lebanon)	Nominated	
2019	Tamara Kotevska	Honeyland	(North Macedonia)	Nominated	Shared with Ljubomir Stefanov.
2020	Jasmila Žbanić	Quo Vadis, Aida?	(Bosnia and Herzegovina)	Nominated	
2020	Kaouther Ben Hania	The Man Who Sold His Skin	(Tunisia)	Nominated	
2025	Kaouther Ben Hania	The Voice of Hind Rajab	(Tunisia)	Nominated	

== Best Makeup and Hairstyling ==
Academy Award for Best Makeup and Hairstyling
Year	Name	Film	Status	Notes
1982	Sarah Monzani; Michèle Burke	Quest for Fire	Won	First women to win and be nominated for Best Makeup and Hairstyling. First foreign language film to win and be nominated in this category.
1986	Michèle Burke	The Clan of the Cave Bear	Nominated	First woman with multiple nominations in this category. Shared with Michael Westmore.
1988	Ve Neill	Beetlejuice	Won	Shared with Steve La Porte and Robert Short.
1988	Bari Dreiband-Burman	Scrooged	Nominated	Shared with Thomas R. Burman.
1989	Lynn Barber	Driving Miss Daisy	Won	Shared with Manlio Rocchetti and Kevin Haney.
1989	Maggie Weston	The Adventures of Baron Munchausen	Nominated	Shared with Fabrizio Sforza.
1990	Michèle Burke	Cyrano de Bergerac	Nominated	Shared with Jean-Pierre Eychenne.
1990	Ve Neill	Edward Scissorhands	Nominated	Shared with Stan Winston.
1991	Christina Smith	Hook	Nominated	Shared with Monty Westmore and Greg Cannom.
1992	Michèle Burke	Bram Stoker's Dracula	Won	First woman with multiple wins in this category. Shared with Greg Cannom and Matthew W. Mungle.
1992	Ve Neill; Ronnie Specter	Batman Returns	Nominated	Shared with Stan Winston.
1992	Ve Neill	Hoffa	Nominated	Shared with Greg Cannom and John Blake.
1993	Ve Neill; Yolanda Toussieng	Mrs. Doubtfire	Won	Shared with Greg Cannom.
1993	Christina Smith; Judith A. Cory	Schindler's List	Nominated	Shared with Matthew W. Mungle.
1994 (Note: All films nominated for Best Makeup and Hairstyling this year featured female make-up artists and/or hairstylists.)	Ve Neill; Yolanda Toussieng	Ed Wood	Won	Shared with Rick Baker.
1994	Hallie D'Amore; Judith A. Cory	Forrest Gump	Nominated	Shared with Daniel C. Striepeke.
1994	Carol Hemming	Mary Shelley's Frankenstein	Nominated	Shared with Daniel Parker and Paul Engelen.
1995	Lois Burwell	Braveheart	Won	Shared with Peter Frampton and Paul Pattison.
1995	Colleen Callaghan	Roommates	Nominated	Shared with Greg Cannom and Bob Laden.
1996	Deborah La Mia Denaver	Ghosts of Mississippi	Nominated	Shared with Matthew W. Mungle.
1997	Lisa Westcott; Veronica Brebner; Beverley Binda	Mrs Brown	Nominated	
1997	Tina Earnshaw	Titanic	Nominated	Shared with Greg Cannom and Simon Thompson.
1998	Jenny Shircore	Elizabeth	Won	
1998	Lois Burwell	Saving Private Ryan	Nominated	Shared with Conor O'Sullivan and Daniel C. Striepeke.
1998	Lisa Westcott; Veronica Brebner	Shakespeare in Love	Nominated	
1999	Christine Blundell	Topsy-Turvy	Won	Shared with Trefor Proud.
1999	Michèle Burke	Austin Powers: The Spy Who Shagged Me	Nominated	Shared with Mike Smithson.
2000	Gail Ryan	How the Grinch Stole Christmas	Won	Shared with Rick Baker.
2000	Michèle Burke	The Cell	Nominated	Shared with Edouard F. Henriques.
2000	Ann Buchanan; Amber Sibley	Shadow of the Vampire	Nominated	
2001	Colleen Callaghan	A Beautiful Mind	Nominated	Shared with Greg Cannom.
2002	Beatrice De Alba	Frida	Won	First Latina to win and be nominated for Best Makeup and Hairstyling. Shared with John E. Jackson.
2002	Barbara Lorenz	The Time Machine	Nominated	Shared with John M. Elliott Jr.
2003	Yolanda Toussieng	Master and Commander: The Far Side of the World	Nominated	Shared with Edouard F. Henriques.
2003	Ve Neill	Pirates of the Caribbean: The Curse of the Black Pearl	Nominated	Shared with Martin Samuel.
2004	Valli O'Reilly	Lemony Snicket's A Series of Unfortunate Events	Won	Shared with Bill Corso.
2004	Jo Allen	The Sea Inside	Nominated	Shared with Manolo García.
2005	Tami Lane	The Chronicles of Narnia: The Lion, the Witch and the Wardrobe	Won	Shared with Howard Berger.
2005	Nikki Gooley	Star Wars: Episode III – Revenge of the Sith	Nominated	Shared with Dave Elsey.
2006	Montse Ribé	Pan's Labyrinth	Won	Shared with David Martí.
2007	Jan Archibald	La Vie en Rose	Won	Shared with Didier Lavergne.
2007	Ve Neill	Pirates of the Caribbean: At World's End	Nominated	Shared with Martin Samuel.
2009	Mindy Hall	Star Trek	Won	Shared with Barney Burman and Joel Harlow.
2009	Jenny Shircore	The Young Victoria	Nominated	Shared with Jon Henry Gordon.
2010	Yolanda Toussieng	The Way Back	Nominated	Shared with Gregory Funk and Edouard F. Henriques.
2011	Lynn Johnson	Albert Nobbs	Nominated	Shared with Martial Corneville and Matthew W. Mungle.
2011	Amanda Knight; Lisa Tomblin	Harry Potter and the Deathly Hallows – Part 2	Nominated	Shared with Nick Dudman.
2012	Lisa Westcott; Julie Dartnell	Les Misérables	Won	
2012	Tami Lane	The Hobbit: An Unexpected Journey	Nominated	Shared with Peter Swords King and Rick Findlater.
2013	Adruitha Lee; Robin Mathews	Dallas Buyers Club	Won	
2013	Gloria Pasqua-Casny	The Lone Ranger	Nominated	Shared with Joel Harlow.
2014	Frances Hannon	The Grand Budapest Hotel	Won	Shared with Mark Coulier.
2014	Elizabeth Yianni-Georgiou	Guardians of the Galaxy	Nominated	Shared with David White.
2015	Lesley Vanderwalt; Elka Wardega	Mad Max: Fury Road	Won	Shared with Damian Martin.
2015	Eva von Bahr	The 100-Year-Old Man Who Climbed Out of the Window and Disappeared	Nominated	Shared with Love Larson.
2015	Siân Grigg	The Revenant	Nominated	Shared with Duncan Jarman and Robert Pandini.
2016	Eva von Bahr	A Man Called Ove	Nominated	Shared with Love Larson.
2017	Lucy Sibbick	Darkest Hour	Won	Shared with Kazuhiro Tsuji and David Malinowski.
2017	Lou Sheppard	Victoria & Abdul	Nominated	Shared with Daniel Phillips.
2018	Kate Biscoe; Patricia Dehaney	Vice	Won	Shared with Greg Cannom.
2018	Pamela Goldammer	Border	Nominated	Shared with Göran Lundström.
2018	Jenny Shircore; Jessica Brooks	Mary Queen of Scots	Nominated	Shared with Marc Pilcher.
2019	Anne Morgan; Vivian Baker	Bombshell	Won	Shared with Kazu Hiro.
2019	Naomi Donne; Rebecca Cole	1917	Nominated	Shared with Tristan Versluis.
2019	Nicki Ledermann; Kay Georgiou	Joker	Nominated	
2020	Mia Neal; Jamika Wilson	Ma Rainey's Black Bottom	Won	First African-American and black women to win and be nominated for Best Makeup and Hairstyling. Shared with Sergio López-Rivera.
2020	Marese Langan; Laura Allen; Claudia Stolze	Emma	Nominated	
2020	Eryn Krueger Mekash; Patricia Dehaney	Hillbilly Elegy	Nominated	Shared with Matthew W. Mungle.
2020	Gigi Williams; Kimberley Spiteri; Colleen LaBaff	Mank	Nominated	
2020	Dalia Colli	Pinocchio	Nominated	Shared with Mark Coulier and Francesco Pegoretti.
2021	Linda Dowds; Stephanie Ingram	The Eyes of Tammy Faye	Won	Shared with Justin Raleigh.
2021	Stacey Morris; Carla Farmer	Coming 2 America	Nominated	Shared with Mike Marino.
2021	Nadia Stacey; Naomi Donne; Julia Vernon	Cruella	Nominated	
2021	Eva von Bahr	Dune	Nominated	Holds the record for most nominations without a win in this category, with three. Shared with Donald Mowat and Love Larson.
2021	Anna Carin Lock	House of Gucci	Nominated	Shared with Göran Lundström and Frederic Aspiras.
2022	Judy Chin; Annemarie Bradley	The Whale	Won	Shared with Adrien Morot.
2022	Heike Merker; Linda Eisenhamerová	All Quiet on the Western Front	Nominated	
2022	Naomi Donne	The Batman	Nominated	Tied the record for most nominations without a win in this category, with three. Shared with Mike Marino and Mike Fontaine.
2022	Camille Friend	Black Panther: Wakanda Forever	Nominated	Shared with Joel Harlow.
2023	Nadia Stacey	Poor Things	Won	Shared with Mark Coulier and Josh Weston.
2023	Karen Hartley Thomas; Suzi Battersby; Ashra Kelly-Blue	Golda	Nominated	
2023	Kay Georgiou; Lori McCoy-Bell	Maestro	Nominated	Shared with Kazu Hiro.
2023	Luisa Abel	Oppenheimer	Nominated	
2023	Ana López-Puigcerver; Montse Ribé	Society of the Snow	Nominated	Shared with David Martí.
2024	Stéphanie Guillon; Marilyne Scarselli	The Substance	Won	Shared with Pierre-Olivier Persin.
2024	Crystal Jurado	A Different Man	Nominated	Shared with Mike Marino and David Presto.
2024	Julia Floch Carbonel	Emilia Pérez	Nominated	Shared with Emmanuel Janvier and Jean-Christophe Spadaccini.
2024	Traci Loader; Suzanne Stokes-Munton	Nosferatu	Nominated	Shared with David White.
2024	Frances Hannon; Laura Blount; Sarah Nuth	Wicked	Nominated	
2025	Cliona Furey	Frankenstein	Won	Shared with Mike Hill and Jordan Samuel.
2025	Kyoko Toyokawa; Naomi Hibino	Kokuho	Nominated	Shared with Tadashi Nishimatsu.
2025	Shunika Terry	Sinners	Nominated	Shared with Ken Diaz and Mike Fontaine.
2025	Anne Cathrine Sauerberg	The Ugly Stepsister	Nominated	Shared with Thomas Foldberg.

== Best Music (Original Score) ==
Academy Award for Best Original Score (Note: This category has had numerous name changes and demarcations throughout its history, as detailed on the award's page.)
Music Score of a Dramatic or Comedy Picture
Year	Name	Film	Status	Notes
1945	Ann Ronell	G.I. Joe	Nominated	First woman to be nominated for Best Original Score. First woman to be nominated in both music categories (For the further information, see Best Original Song). Shared with Louis Applebaum.
Original Song Score
1970	Tylwyth Kymry (lyrics)	The Baby Maker	Nominated	Shared with Fred Karlin (music).
Original Song Score and Its Adaptation or Adaptation Score
1974	Angela Morley (adaptation score)	The Little Prince	Nominated	First transgender woman to be nominated in any category. Shared with Alan Jay Lerner & Frederick Loewe (song score); Douglas Gamley (adaptation score).
1977	Angela Morley (adaptation score)	The Slipper and the Rose	Nominated	First transgender woman with multiple nominations in any category. Shared with Sherman Brothers (song score).
1983	Marilyn Bergman (song score)	Yentl	Won	First woman to win for Best Original Score. First woman to win in both music categories (For the further information, see Best Original Song). Shared with Michel Legrand (song & adaptation score); Alan Bergman (song score).
Original Musical or Comedy Score
1996	Rachel Portman	Emma	Won	
1997	Anne Dudley	The Full Monty	Won	
1997	Lynn Ahrens	Anastasia	Nominated	Shared with Stephen Flaherty & David Newman.
Original Score
1999	Rachel Portman	The Cider House Rules	Nominated	
2000	Rachel Portman	Chocolat	Nominated	
2016	Mica Levi	Jackie	Nominated	Subsequently, came out as non-binary.
2019	Hildur Guðnadóttir	Joker	Won	
2021	Germaine Franco	Encanto	Nominated	First Latina to be nominated for Best Original Score.
2023	Laura Karpman	American Fiction	Nominated	
2024	Camille	Emilia Pérez	Nominated	Shared with Clément Ducol.

== Best Music (Original Song) ==
Academy Award for Best Original Song
Year	Name	Film	Song	Status	Notes
1935	Dorothy Fields (lyrics)	Roberta	"Lovely to Look At"	Nominated	First woman to be nominated for Best Original Song; Shared with Jerome Kern (music); Jimmy McHugh (lyrics).
1936	Dorothy Fields (lyrics)	Swing Time	"The Way You Look Tonight"	Won	First woman to win for Best Original Song. First woman with multiple nominations in this category. Shared with Jerome Kern (music).
1945	Ann Ronell (music & lyrics)	G.I. Joe	"Linda"	Nominated	First woman to be nominated in both music categories (For the further information, see Best Original Score).
1953	Sylvia Fine (lyrics)	The Moon Is Blue	"The Moon Is Blue"	Nominated	Shared with Herschel Burke Gilbert (music).
1959	Sylvia Fine (music & lyrics)	The Five Pennies	"The Five Pennies"	Nominated	
1960	Dory Langdon (lyrics)	Pepe	"Faraway Part of Town"	Nominated	Shared with André Previn (music).
1962	Dory Langdon (lyrics)	Two for the Seesaw	"Song from Two for the Seesaw (Second Chance)"	Nominated	Shared with André Previn (music).
1968	Marilyn Bergman (lyrics)	The Thomas Crown Affair	"The Windmills of Your Mind"	Won	First woman to win in both music categories (For the further information, see Best Original Score). Shared with Michel Legrand (music); Alan Bergman (lyrics).
1969	Marilyn Bergman (lyrics)	The Happy Ending	"What Are You Doing the Rest of Your Life?"	Nominated	First woman to win in both music categories (For the further information, see Best Original Score). Shared with Michel Legrand (music); Alan Bergman (lyrics).
1969	Dory Langdon (lyrics)	The Sterile Cuckoo	"Come Saturday Morning"	Nominated	Shared with Fred Karlin (music).
1970	Marilyn Bergman (lyrics)	Pieces of Dreams	"Pieces of Dreams"	Nominated	Shared with Michel Legrand (music); Alan Bergman (lyrics).
1971	Marilyn Bergman (lyrics)	Sometimes a Great Notion	"All His Children"	Nominated	Shared with Henry Mancini (music); Alan Bergman (lyrics).
1972	Marilyn Bergman (lyrics)	The Life and Times of Judge Roy Bean	"Marmalade, Molasses & Honey"	Nominated	Shared with Maurice Jarre (music); Alan Bergman (lyrics).
1972	Marsha Karlin (lyrics)	The Little Ark	"Come Follow, Follow Me"	Nominated	Shared with Fred Karlin (music).
1973	Marilyn Bergman (lyrics)	The Way We Were	"The Way We Were"	Won	First woman with multiple wins in this category. Shared with Marvin Hamlisch (music); Alan Bergman (lyrics).
1973	Linda McCartney (music & lyrics)	Live and Let Die	"Live and Let Die"	Nominated	Shared with Paul McCartney (music & lyrics).
1974	Betty Box (lyrics)	Benji	"I Feel Love"	Nominated	Shared with Euel Box (music).
1976	Barbra Streisand (music)	A Star Is Born	"Evergreen"	Won	First and only person to win for acting (Best Actress for Funny Girl) and songwriting. Shared with Paul Williams (lyrics).
1976	Carol Connors & Ayn Robbins (lyrics)	Rocky	"Gonna Fly Now"	Nominated	Shared with Bill Conti (music).
1977	Carol Connors & Ayn Robbins (lyrics)	The Rescuers	"Someone's Waiting for You"	Nominated	Shared with Sammy Fain (music).
1977	Carole Bayer Sager (lyrics)	The Spy Who Loved Me	"Nobody Does It Better"	Nominated	Shared with Marvin Hamlisch (music).
1978	Marilyn Bergman (lyrics)	Same Time, Next Year	"The Last Time I Felt Like This"	Nominated	Shared with Marvin Hamlisch (music); Alan Bergman (lyrics).
1979	Carole Bayer Sager (lyrics)	Ice Castles	"Through the Eyes of Love"	Nominated	Shared with Marvin Hamlisch (music).
1979	Marilyn Bergman (lyrics)	The Promise	"I'll Never Say Goodbye"	Nominated	Shared with David Shire (music); Alan Bergman (lyrics).
1980	Lesley Gore (lyrics)	Fame	"Out Here on My Own"	Nominated	Shared with Michael Gore (music).
1980	Dolly Parton (music & lyrics)	Nine to Five	"9 to 5"	Nominated	
1981	Carole Bayer Sager (music & lyrics)	Arthur	"Arthur's Theme (Best That You Can Do)"	Won	Shared with Burt Bacharach, Christopher Cross & Peter Allen (music & lyrics).
1982	Buffy Sainte-Marie (music)	An Officer and a Gentleman	"Up Where We Belong"	Won	Shared with Jack Nitzche (music); Will Jennings (lyrics).
1982	Marilyn Bergman (lyrics)	Best Friends	"How Do You Keep the Music Playing?"	Nominated	Shared with Michel Legrand (music); Alan Bergman (lyrics).
1982	Marilyn Bergman (lyrics)	Tootsie	"It Might Be You"	Nominated	Shared with Dave Grusin (music); Alan Bergman (lyrics).
1982	Marilyn Bergman (lyrics)	Yes, Giorgio	"If We Were in Love"	Nominated	Shared with John Williams (music); Alan Bergman (lyrics).
1983	Irene Cara (lyrics)	Flashdance	"Flashdance... What a Feeling"	Won	First Black woman to win in a non-acting category. Shared with Giorgio Moroder (music); Keith Forsey (lyrics).
1983	Marilyn Bergman (lyrics)	Yentl	"Papa, Can You Hear Me?"	Nominated	First woman to be nominated multiple times in the same category for the same film. Shared with Michel Legrand (music); Alan Bergman (lyrics).
1983	Marilyn Bergman (lyrics)	Yentl	"The Way He Makes Me Feel"	Nominated	First woman to be nominated multiple times in the same category for the same film. Shared with Michel Legrand (music); Alan Bergman (lyrics).
1986	Cynthia Weil (lyrics)	An American Tail	"Somewhere Out There"	Nominated	Shared with James Horner & Barry Mann (music).
1986	Diane Nini (lyrics)	The Karate Kid Part II	"Glory of Love"	Nominated	Shared with David Foster (music); Peter Cetera (music & lyrics).
1987	Diane Warren (music & lyrics)	Mannequin	"Nothing's Gonna Stop Us Now"	Nominated	Shared with Albert Hammond (music & lyrics).
1988	Carly Simon (music & lyrics)	Working Girl	"Let the River Run"	Won	
1989	Marilyn Bergman (lyrics)	Shirley Valentine	"The Girl Who Used to Be Me"	Nominated	Shared with Marvin Hamlisch (music); Alan Bergman (lyrics).
1992	Linda Thompson (lyrics)	The Bodyguard	"I Have Nothing"	Nominated	Shared with David Foster (music).
1993	Carole Bayer Sager (music & lyrics)	Beethoven's 2nd	"The Day I Fall in Love"	Nominated	Shared with James Ingram & Clif Magness (music & lyrics).
1993	Janet Jackson (music & lyrics)	Poetic Justice	"Again"	Nominated	Shared with James Harris III & Terry Lewis (music & lyrics).
1994	Carole Bayer Sager & Patty Smyth (music & lyrics)	Junior	"Look What Love Has Done"	Nominated	Shared with James Ingram & James Newton Howard (music & lyrics).
1995	Marilyn Bergman (lyrics)	Sabrina	"Moonlight"	Nominated	Shared with John Williams (music); Alan Bergman (lyrics).
1996	Barbra Streisand (music & lyrics)	The Mirror Has Two Faces	"I Finally Found Someone"	Nominated	Shared with Bryan Adams, Marvin Hamlisch & Mutt Lange (music & lyrics).
1996	Diane Warren (music & lyrics)	Up Close and Personal	"Because You Loved Me"	Nominated	
1997	Lynn Ahrens (lyrics)	Anastasia	"Journey to the Past"	Nominated	Shared with Stephen Flaherty (music).
1997	Diane Warren (music & lyrics)	Con Air	"How Do I Live?"	Nominated	
1998	Diane Warren (music & lyrics)	Armageddon	"I Don't Wanna Miss a Thing"	Nominated	
1998	Allison Moorer (music & lyrics)	The Horse Whisperer	"A Soft Place to Fall"	Nominated	Shared with Gwil Owen (music & lyrics).
1998	Carole Bayer Sager (music & lyrics)	Quest for Camelot	"The Prayer"	Nominated	Shared with David Foster (music & lyrics); Tony Renis & Alberto Testa (lyrics).
1999	Aimee Mann (music & lyrics)	Magnolia	"Save Me"	Nominated	
1999	Diane Warren (music & lyrics)	Music of the Heart	"Music of My Heart"	Nominated	
2000	Björk (music)	Dancer in the Dark	"I've Seen It All"	Nominated	Shared with Lars von Trier & Sjón Sigurdsson (lyrics).
2001	Enya & Roma Ryan (music & lyrics)	The Lord of the Rings: The Fellowship of the Ring	"May It Be"	Nominated	Shared with Nicky Ryan (music & lyrics).
2001	Diane Warren (music & lyrics)	Pearl Harbor	"There You'll Be"	Nominated	
2002	Julie Taymor (lyrics)	Frida	"Burn It Blue"	Nominated	Shared with Elliot Goldenthal (music).
2003	Annie Lennox & Fran Walsh (music & lyrics)	The Lord of the Rings: The Return of the King	"Into the West"	Won	Shared with Howard Shore (music & lyrics).
2003	Annette O'Toole (music & lyrics)	A Mighty Wind	"A Kiss at the End of the Rainbow"	Nominated	Shared with Michael McKean (music & lyrics).
2005	Kathleen "Bird" York (music & lyrics)	Crash	"In the Deep"	Nominated	Shared with Michael Becker (music).
2005	Dolly Parton (music & lyrics)	Transamerica	"Travellin' Thru"	Nominated	
2006	Melissa Etheridge (music & lyrics)	An Inconvenient Truth	"I Need to Wake Up	Won	First song from a documentary to win in this category.
2006	Anne Preven (lyrics)	Dreamgirls	"Listen"	Nominated	Shared with Scott Cutler & Henry Krieger (music).
2006	Siedah Garrett (lyrics)	Dreamgirls	"Love You I Do"	Nominated	Shared with Henry Krieger (music).
2007	Markéta Irglová (music & lyrics)	Once	"Falling Slowly"	Won	Shared with Glen Hansard (music & lyrics).
2008	M.I.A. (music & lyrics)	Slumdog Millionaire	"O... Saya"	Nominated	Shared with A. R. Rahman (music & lyrics).
2010	Dido (lyrics)	127 Hours	"If I Rise"	Nominated	Shared with A. R. Rahman (music); Rollo Armstrong (lyrics).
2010	Hillary Lindsey (music & lyrics)	Country Strong	"Coming Home"	Nominated	Shared with Troy Verges & Tom Douglas (music & lyrics).
2011	Siedah Garrett (lyrics)	Rio	"Real In Rio"	Nominated	Shared with Sérgio Mendes & Carlinhos Brown (music).
2012	Adele (music & lyrics)	Skyfall	"Skyfall"	Won	Shared with Paul Epworth (music & lyrics).
2012	Bombay Jayashri (lyrics)	Life of Pi	"Pi's Lullaby"	Nominated	Shared with Mychael Danna (music).
2013	Kristen Anderson-Lopez (music & lyrics)	Frozen	"Let It Go"	Won	Shared with Robert Lopez (music & lyrics).
2013	Karen O (music & lyrics)	Her	"The Moon Song"	Nominated	Shared with Spike Jonze (lyrics).
2014	Danielle Brisebois (music & lyrics)	Begin Again	"Lost Stars"	Nominated	Shared with Gregg Alexander (music & lyrics).
2014	Diane Warren (music & lyrics)	Beyond the Lights	"Grateful"	Nominated	
2015	Diane Warren & Lady Gaga (music & lyrics)	The Hunting Ground	"Till It Happens to You"	Nominated	
2015	Anohni (lyrics)	Racing Extinction	"Manta Ray"	Nominated	First transgender woman to be nominated for Best Original Song. Shared with J. Ralph (music).
2017	Kristen Anderson-Lopez (music & lyrics)	Coco	"Remember Me"	Won	Shared with Robert Lopez (music & lyrics).
2017	Diane Warren (music & lyrics)	Marshall	"Stand Up for Something"	Nominated	Shared with Lonnie Lynn (lyrics).
2017	Mary J. Blige & Taura Stinson (music & lyrics)	Mudbound	"Mighty River"	Nominated	Blige was the first person to be nominated for acting (Best Supporting Actress for Mudbound) and songwriting in the same year. Shared with Raphael Saadiq (music & lyrics).
2018	Lady Gaga (music & lyrics)	A Star is Born	"Shallow"	Won	Shared with Mark Ronson, Anthony Rossomando & Andrew Wyatt (music & lyrics).
2018	Gillian Welch (music & lyrics)	The Ballad of Buster Scruggs	"When a Cowboy Trades His Spurs for Wings"	Nominated	Shared with David Rawlings (music & lyrics).
2018	SZA (lyrics)	Black Panther	"All the Stars"	Nominated	Shared with Sounwave (music); Kendrick Lamar & Anthony Tiffith (music & lyrics).
2018	Diane Warren (music & lyrics)	RBG	"I'll Fight"	Nominated	
2019	Diane Warren (music & lyrics)	Breakthrough	"I'm Standing with You"	Nominated	
2019	Kristen Anderson-Lopez (music & lyrics)	Frozen II	"Into the Unknown"	Nominated	Shared with Robert Lopez (music & lyrics).
2019	Cynthia Erivo (music & lyrics)	Harriet	"Stand Up"	Nominated	Shared with Joshuah Brian Campbell (music & lyrics).
2020	H.E.R. (music & lyrics); Tiara Thomas (lyrics)	Judas and the Black Messiah	"Fight for You"	Won	Shared with Dernst Emile II (music).
2020	Diane Warren (music & lyrics); Laura Pausini (lyrics)	The Life Ahead	"Io Sì (Seen)"	Nominated	
2020	Celeste Waite (lyrics)	The Trial of the Chicago 7	"Hear My Voice"	Nominated	Shared with Daniel Pemberton (music & lyrics).
2021	Billie Eilish (music & lyrics)	No Time to Die	"No Time to Die"	Won	First person born in the 21st century to win in any category. Shared with Finneas O'Connell (music & lyrics).
2021	Diane Warren (music & lyrics)	Four Good Days	"Somehow You Do"	Nominated	
2021	Beyoncé (music & lyrics)	King Richard	"Be Alive"	Nominated	Shared with DIXSON (music & lyrics).
2022	Rihanna (music); Tems (music & lyrics)	Black Panther: Wakanda Forever	"Lift Me Up"	Nominated	Shared with Ludwig Göransson (music); Ryan Coogler (music & lyrics).
2022	Mitski (music)	Everything Everywhere All at Once	"This Is a Life"	Nominated	Shared with David Byrne & Ryan Lott (music & lyrics).
2022	Diane Warren (music & lyrics)	Tell It Like a Woman	"Applause"	Nominated	
2022	Lady Gaga (music & lyrics)	Top Gun: Maverick	"Hold My Hand"	Nominated	Shared with BloodPop (music & lyrics).
2023	Billie Eilish (music & lyrics)	Barbie	"What Was I Made For?"	Won	Youngest person to win multiple Oscars, at age 22. Shared with Finneas O'Connell (music & lyrics).
2023	Diane Warren (music & lyrics)	Flamin' Hot	"The Fire Inside"	Nominated	
2024	Camille (music & lyrics)	Emilia Pérez	"El Mal"	Won	Shared with Clément Ducol (music & lyrics); Jacques Audiard (lyrics).
2024	Brandi Carlile (music & lyrics)	Elton John: Never Too Late	"Never Too Late"	Nominated	Shared with Elton John, Andrew Watt & Bernie Taupin (music & lyrics).
2024	Camille (music & lyrics)	Emilia Pérez	"Mi Camino"	Nominated	Shared with Clément Ducol (music & lyrics).
2024	Diane Warren (music & lyrics)	The Six Triple Eight	"The Journey"	Nominated	
2025	Ejae (music & lyrics)	KPop Demon Hunters	"Golden"	Won	Shared with Mark Sonnenblick, Joong Gyu Kwak, Yu Han Lee, Hee Dong Nam, Jeong Hoon Seon and Teddy Park (music & lyrics).
2025	Diane Warren (music & lyrics)	Diane Warren: Relentless	"Dear Me"	Nominated	Holds the record for most nominations without a win in this category, with 17. Holds the record for most nominations without a win in any category, with 17.

== Best Picture ==
Academy Award for Best Picture
Year	Name	Film	Status	Notes
1973	Julia Phillips	The Sting	Won	First woman to win and be nominated for Best Picture. Shared with Tony Bill and Michael Phillips.
1976	Julia Phillips	Taxi Driver	Nominated	First woman with multiple nominations in this category. Shared with Michael Phillips.
1979	Tamara Asseyev; Alex Rose	Norma Rae	Nominated	
1982	Kathleen Kennedy	E.T. the Extra-Terrestrial	Nominated	Shared with Steven Spielberg.
1984	Arlene Donovan	Places in the Heart	Nominated	
1985	Kathleen Kennedy	The Color Purple	Nominated	Shared with Steven Spielberg, Frank Marshall, and Quincy Jones.
1987	Sherry Lansing	Fatal Attraction	Nominated	Shared with Stanley R. Jaffe.
1988	Norma Heyman	Dangerous Liaisons	Nominated	Shared with Hank Moonjean.
1989	Lili Fini Zanuck	Driving Miss Daisy	Won	Shared with Richard D. Zanuck.
1990	Lisa Weinstein	Ghost	Nominated	
1991	Barbra Streisand	The Prince of Tides	Nominated	Shared with Andrew Karsch.
1993	Jan Chapman	The Piano	Nominated	
1994	Wendy Finerman	Forrest Gump	Won	Shared with Steve Tisch and Steve Starkey.
1994	Niki Marvin	The Shawshank Redemption	Nominated	
1995	Lindsay Doran	Sense and Sensibility	Nominated	
1996	Jane Scott	Shine	Nominated	
1997	Bridget Johnson; Kristi Zea	As Good as It Gets	Nominated	Shared with James L. Brooks.
1998	Donna Gigliotti	Shakespeare in Love	Won	Shared with David Parfitt, Harvey Weinstein, Edward Zwick, and Marc Norman.
1998	Alison Owen	Elizabeth	Nominated	Shared with Eric Fellner and Tim Bevan.
1998	Elda Ferri	Life Is Beautiful	Nominated	Shared with Gianluigi Braschi.
1999	Kathleen Kennedy	The Sixth Sense	Nominated	Shared with Frank Marshall and Barry Mendel.
2000	Kit Golden; Leslie Holleran	Chocolat	Nominated	Shared with David Brown.
2000	Stacey Sher	Erin Brockovich	Nominated	Shared with Danny DeVito and Michael Shamberg.
2000	Laura Bickford	Traffic	Nominated	Shared with Edward Zwick and Marshall Herskovitz.
2001	Fran Walsh	The Lord of the Rings: The Fellowship of the Ring	Nominated	Shared with Peter Jackson and Barrie M. Osborne.
2002	Fran Walsh	The Lord of the Rings: The Two Towers	Nominated	Shared with Peter Jackson and Barrie M. Osborne.
2003	Fran Walsh	The Lord of the Rings: The Return of the King	Won	Shared with Peter Jackson and Barrie M. Osborne.
2003	Sofia Coppola	Lost in Translation	Nominated	Shared with Ross Katz.
2003	Judie G. Hoyt	Mystic River	Nominated	Shared with Robert Lorenz and Clint Eastwood.
2003	Kathleen Kennedy	Seabiscuit	Nominated	Shared with Frank Marshall and Gary Ross.
2004	Nellie Bellflower	Finding Neverland	Nominated	Shared with Richard N. Gladstein.
2005	Cathy Schulman	Crash	Won	Shared with Paul Haggis.
2005	Diana Ossana	Brokeback Mountain	Nominated	Shared with James Schamus.
2005	Caroline Baron	Capote	Nominated	Shared with William Vince and Michael Ohoven.
2005	Kathleen Kennedy	Munich	Nominated	Shared with Steven Spielberg and Barry Mendel.
2006	Christine Langan; Tracey Seaward	The Queen	Nominated	Shared with Andy Harries.
2007	Lianne Halfon	Juno	Nominated	Shared with Mason Novick and Russell Smith.
2007	Jennifer Fox	Michael Clayton	Nominated	Shared with Kerry Orent and Sydney Pollack.
2007	JoAnne Sellar	There Will Be Blood	Nominated	Shared with Paul Thomas Anderson and Daniel Lupi.
2008	Kathleen Kennedy; Ceán Chaffin	The Curious Case of Benjamin Button	Nominated	Shared with Frank Marshall.
2008	Donna Gigliotti	The Reader	Nominated	Shared with Anthony Minghella (p. n.), Sydney Pollack (p. n.), and Redmond Morris.
2009 (Note: In 2009, the Academy expanded the number of nominees for Best Picture from five nominees to (potentially) ten nominees. In every subsequent year, there has been at least four films with female producers nominated for the award.)	Kathryn Bigelow	The Hurt Locker	Won	Shared with Mark Boal, Greg Shapiro, and Nicolas Chartier.
2009	Carolynne Cunningham	District 9	Nominated	Shared with Peter Jackson.
2009	Finola Dwyer; Amanda Posey	An Education	Nominated	
2009	Sarah Siegel-Magness	Precious: Based on the Novel 'Push' by Sapphire	Nominated	Shared with Lee Daniels and Gary Magness.
2010	Emma Thomas	Inception	Nominated	Shared with Christopher Nolan.
2010	Celine Rattray	The Kids Are All Right	Nominated	Shared with Gary Gilbert and Jeffrey Levy-Hinte.
2010	Ceán Chaffin	The Social Network	Nominated	Shared with Dana Brunetti, Michael De Luca, and Scott Rudin.
2010	Darla K. Anderson	Toy Story 3	Nominated	
2010	Alix Madigan; Anne Rosellini	Winter's Bone	Nominated	
2011	Letty Aronson	Midnight in Paris	Nominated	Shared with Stephen Tenenbaum.
2011	Rachael Horovitz	Moneyball	Nominated	Shared with Michael De Luca and Brad Pitt.
2011	Sarah Green; Dede Gardner	The Tree of Life	Nominated	Shared with Bill Pohlad and Grant Hill.
2011	Kathleen Kennedy	War Horse	Nominated	Shared with Steven Spielberg.
2012	Margaret Menegoz	Amour	Nominated	Shared with Stefan Arndt, Veit Heiduschka, and Michael Katz.
2012	Stacey Sher; Pilar Savone	Django Unchained	Nominated	Shared with Reginald Hudlin.
2012	Debra Hayward	Les Misérables	Nominated	Shared with Tim Bevan, Eric Fellner, and Cameron Mackintosh.
2012	Kathleen Kennedy	Lincoln	Nominated	Holds the record for most nominations without a win in this category, with eight. Shared with Steven Spielberg.
2012	Donna Gigliotti	Silver Linings Playbook	Nominated	Shared with Bruce Cohen and Jonathan Gordon.
2012	Kathryn Bigelow; Megan Ellison	Zero Dark Thirty	Nominated	Shared with Mark Boal.
2013	Dede Gardner	12 Years a Slave	Won	Shared with Brad Pitt, Jeremy Kleiner, Steven McQueen, and Anthony Katagas.
2013	Megan Ellison	American Hustle	Nominated	Shared with Charles Roven, Richard Suckle, and Jonathan Gordon.
2013	Robbie Brenner; Rachel Winter	Dallas Buyers Club	Nominated	
2013	Megan Ellison	Her	Nominated	Shared with Vincent Landay and Spike Jones.
2013	Gabrielle Tana; Tracey Seaward	Philomena	Nominated	Shared with Steve Coogan.
2013	Emma Tillinger Koskoff	The Wolf of Wall Street	Nominated	Shared with Martin Scorsese, Leonardo DiCaprio, and Joey McFarland.
2014	Cathleen Sutherland	Boyhood	Nominated	Shared with Richard Linklater.
2014	Nora Grossman	The Imitation Game	Nominated	Shared with Ido Ostrowsky and Teddy Schwarzman.
2014	Oprah Winfrey; Dede Gardner	Selma	Nominated	Winfrey was the first woman of color to be nominated for Best Picture. Shared with Christian Colson and Jeremy Kleiner.
2014	Lisa Bruce	The Theory of Everything	Nominated	Shared with Tim Bevan, Eric Fellner, and Anthony McCarten.
2014	Helen Estabrook	Whiplash	Nominated	Shared with Jason Blum and David Lancaster.
2015	Blye Pagon Faust; Nicole Rocklin	Spotlight	Won	Shared with Steve Golin and Michael Sugar.
2015	Dede Gardner	The Big Short	Nominated	Shared with Jeremy Kleiner and Brad Pitt.
2015	Kristie Macosko Krieger	Bridge of Spies	Nominated	Shared with Marc Platt and Steven Spielberg.
2015	Finola Dwyer; Amanda Posey	Brooklyn	Nominated	
2015	Mary Parent	The Revenant	Nominated	Shared with Alejandro G. Iñárritu, Steve Golin, Arnon Milchan, and Keith Redmon.
2016	Adele Romanski; Dede Gardner	Moonlight	Won	Gardner was the first woman with multiple wins in this category. Shared with Jeremy Kleiner.
2016	Carla Hacken; Julie Yorn	Hell or High Water	Nominated	
2016	Donna Gigliotti; Jenno Topping	Hidden Figures	Nominated	Shared with Peter Chernin, Pharrell Williams, and Theodore Melfi.
2016	Angie Fielder	Lion	Nominated	Shared with Emile Sherman and Iain Canning.
2016	Kimberly Steward; Lauren Beck	Manchester by the Sea	Nominated	Shared with Matt Damon, Chris Moore, and Kevin J. Walsh.
2017	Émilie Georges	Call Me by Your Name	Nominated	Shared with Luca Guadagnino, Peter Spears, and Marco Morabito.
2017	Lisa Bruce	Darkest Hour	Nominated	Shared with Tim Bevan, Eric Fellner, Anthony McCarten, and Douglas Urbanski.
2017	Emma Thomas	Dunkirk	Nominated	Shared with Christopher Nolan.
2017	Evelyn O'Neill	Lady Bird	Nominated	Shared with Eli Bush and Scott Rudin.
2017	Megan Ellison; JoAnne Sellar	Phantom Thread	Nominated	Shared with Paul Thomas Anderson and Daniel Lupi.
2017	Kristie Macosko Krieger; Amy Pascal	The Post	Nominated	Shared with Steven Spielberg.
2018	Ceci Dempsey; Lee Magiday	The Favourite	Nominated	Shared with Ed Guiney and Yorgos Lanthimos.
2018	Gabriela Rodríguez	Roma	Nominated	First Latina to be nominated for Best Picture. Shared with Alfonso Cuarón.
2018	Lynette Howell Taylor	A Star is Born	Nominated	Shared with Bill Gerber and Bradley Cooper.
2018	Dede Gardner	Vice	Nominated	Shared with Jeremy Kleiner, Adam McKay, and Kevin Messick.
2019	Kwak Sin-ae	Parasite	Won	First woman of color to win for Best Picture. Shared with Bong Joon-ho. First foreign language film to win in this category.
2019	Pippa Harris; Jayne-Ann Tenggren	1917	Nominated	Shared with Sam Mendes and Callum McDougal.
2019	Jenno Topping	Ford v Ferrari	Nominated	Shared with Peter Chernin and James Mangold.
2019	Jane Rosenthal; Emma Tillinger Koskoff	The Irishman	Nominated	Shared with Martin Scorsese and Robert De Niro.
2019	Chelsea Winstanley	Jojo Rabbit	Nominated	First Indigenous woman to be nominated for Best Picture. Shared with Carthew Neal and Taika Waititi.
2019	Emma Tillinger Koskoff	Joker	Nominated	Shared with Todd Phillips and Bradley Cooper.
2019	Amy Pascal	Little Women	Nominated	
2019	Shannon McIntosh	Once Upon a Time in Hollywood	Nominated	Shared with David Heyman and Quentin Tarantino.
2020	Frances McDormand; Mollye Asher; Chloé Zhao	Nomadland	Won	McDormand is the first woman to win for acting (Best Actress for Fargo) and producing. McDormand is the first person to win for acting (Best Actress for Nomadland) and producing in the same year. Shared with Peter Spears and Dan Janvey.
2020	Ceán Chaffin	Mank	Nominated	Shared with Eric Roth and Douglas Urbanski.
2020	Christina Oh	Minari	Nominated	
2020	Ashley Fox; Emerald Fennell	Promising Young Woman	Nominated	Shared with Josey McNamara and Ben Browning.
2021	Laura Berwick; Becca Kovacik; Tamar Thomas	Belfast	Nominated	Shared with Kenneth Branagh.
2021	Mary Parent	Dune	Nominated	Shared with Denis Villeneuve and Cale Boyter.
2021	Sara Murphy	Licorice Pizza	Nominated	Shared with Adam Somner and Paul Thomas Anderson.
2021	Jane Campion; Tanya Seghatchian	The Power of the Dog	Nominated	Shared with Emile Sherman, Iain Canning, and Roger Frappier.
2021	Kristie Macosko Krieger	West Side Story	Nominated	Shared with Steven Spielberg.
2022	Catherine Martin; Gail Berman	Elvis	Nominated	Shared with Baz Luhrmann, Patrick McCormick, and Schuyler Weiss.
2022	Kristie Macosko Krieger	The Fabelmans	Nominated	Shared with Steven Spielberg and Tony Kushner.
2022	Alexandra Milchan	Tár	Nominated	Shared with Todd Field and Scott Lambert.
2022	Dede Gardner; Frances McDormand	Women Talking	Nominated	Shared with Jeremy Kleiner.
2023	Emma Thomas	Oppenheimer	Won	Shared with Charles Roven and Christopher Nolan.
2023	Marie-Ange Luciani	Anatomy of a Fall	Nominated	Shared with David Thion.
2023	Margot Robbie; Robbie Brenner	Barbie	Nominated	Shared with David Heyman and Tom Ackerley.
2023	Amy Derning; Kristie Macosko Krieger	Maestro	Nominated	Shared with Bradley Cooper, Steven Spielberg, and Fred Berner.
2023	Christine Vachon; Pamela Koffler	Past Lives	Nominated	Shared with David Hinojosa.
2023	Emma Stone	Poor Things	Nominated	Shared with Ed Guiney, Andrew Lowe and Yorgos Lanthimos.
2024	Samantha Quan	Anora	Won	Shared with Alex Coco and Sean Baker.
2024	Tessa Ross; Juliette Howell	Conclave	Nominated	Shared with Michael A. Jackman.
2024	Mary Parent; Tanya Lapointe	Dune: Part Two	Nominated	Shared with Cale Boyter and Denis Villeneuve.
2024	Maria Carlota Bruno	I'm Still Here	Nominated	Shared with Rodrigo Teixeira
2024	Dede Gardner; Joslyn Barnes	Nickel Boys	Nominated	Shared with Jeremy Kleiner.
2024	Coralie Fargeat	The Substance	Nominated	Shared with Tim Bevan and Eric Fellner.
2025	Sara Murphy	One Battle After Another	Won	Shared with Adam Somner (p. a.) and Paul Thomas Anderson.
2025	Emma Stone	Bugonia	Nominated	Shared with Ed Guiney, Andrew Lowe, Yorgos Lanthimos and Lars Knudsen.
2025	Dede Gardner	F1	Nominated	Holds the record for most nomination for a woman in this category, with nine. Shared with Chad Oman, Brad Pitt, Jeremy Kleiner, Joseph Kosinski, and Jerry Bruckheimer.
2025	Liza Marshall; Pippa Harris	Hamnet	Nominated	Shared with Nicolas Gonda, Steven Spielberg, and Sam Mendes.
2025	Emilie Lesclaux	The Secret Agent	Nominated	
2025	Maria Ekerhovd; Andrea Berentsen Ottmar	Sentimental Value	Nominated	
2025	Zinzi Coogler	Sinners	Nominated	Shared with Sev Ohanian and Ryan Coogler.
2025	Marissa McMahon; Ashley Schlaifer	Train Dreams	Nominated	Shared with Teddy Schwarzman, Will Janowitz and Michael Heimler.

== Best Production Design ==
Academy Award for Best Production Design (Note: This category was re-introduced at the 40th Academy Awards by merging two previously separate categories for Best Production Design (Black-and-White) and Best Production Design (Color) into a single Best Production Design category.)
Year	Name	Film	Status	Notes
Black-and-White
1941	Julia Heron (set decoration)	That Hamilton Woman	Nominated	First woman to be nominated in production categories. Shared with Vincent Korda (production design).
1942	Black-and-White			
1942	Fay Babcock (set decoration)	The Talk of the Town	Nominated	Shared with Lionel Banks and Rudolph Sternad (production design).
1942	Color			
1942	Julia Heron (set decoration)	Jungle Book	Nominated	First woman to be nominated for Best Production Design (Color). First woman with multiple nominations in production categories. First woman to be nominated in both production categories. Shared with Vincent Korda (production design).
Black-and-White
1943	Julia Heron (set decoration)	Casanova Brown	Nominated	Shared with Perry Ferguson (production design).
Color
1944	Fay Babcock (set decoration)	Cover Girl	Nominated	Shared with Lionel Banks and Cary Odell (production design).
1945	Mildred Griffiths (set decoration)	National Velvet	Nominated	Shared with Cedric Gibbons and Urie McCleary (production design); Edwin B. Willis (set decoration).
Black-and-White
1946	Carmen Dillon (production design)	Henry V	Nominated	Shared with Paul Sheriff (production design).
1948	Carmen Dillon (set decoration)	Hamlet	Won	First woman to win in production categories. Shared with Roger K. Furse (production design).
1954	Black-and-White			
1954	Grace Gregory (set decoration)	This Country Girl	Nominated	Shared with Hal Pereira and Roland Anderson (production design); Samuel M. Comer (set decoration).
1954	Color			
1954	Irene Sharaff (production design)	A Star Is Born	Nominated	Shared with Malcolm C. Bert and Gene Allen (production design); George James Hopkins (set decoration).
Color
1959	Julia Heron (set decoration)	The Big Fisherman	Nominated	Shared with John DeCuir (production design).
1959	Ruby R. Levitt (set decoration)	Pillow Talk	Nominated	Shared with Richard H. Riedel (p. n.) (production design); Russell A. Gausman (set decoration).
1960	Julia Heron (set decoration)	Spartacus	Won	First woman to win for Best Production Design (Color). Shared with Harry Horner and Eric Orbom (production design); Russell A. Gausman (set decoration).
1963	Black-and-White			
1963	Grace Gregory (set decoration)	Love with the Proper Stranger	Nominated	Shared with Hal Pereira and Roland Anderson (production design); Samuel M. Comer (set decoration).
1963	Color			
1963	Jocelyn Herbert (production design); Josie MacAvin (set decoration)	Tom Jones	Nominated	Shared with Ralph W. Brinton and Ted Marshall (production design).
1965	Black-and-White			
1965	Josie MacAvin (set decoration)	The Spy Who Came in from the Cold	Nominated	Shared with Hal Pereira and Tambi Larsen (production design); Ted Marshall (set decoration).
1965	Color			
1965	Ruby R. Levitt (set decoration)	The Sound of Music	Nominated	Shared with Boris Leven (production design); Walter M. Scott (set decoration).
Production Design
1970	Pamela Cornell (set decoration)	Scrooge	Nominated	Shared with Terence Marsh and Robert Cartwright (production design).
1971	Ruby R. Levitt (set decoration)	The Andromeda Strain	Nominated	Shared with Boris Leven and William H. Tuntke (production design).
1974	Ruby R. Levitt (set decoration)	Chinatown	Nominated	Shared with Richard Sylbert and W. Stewart Campbell (production design).
1979	Linda DeScenna (set decoration)	Star Trek: The Motion Picture	Nominated	Shared with Harold Michelson, Joseph R. Jennings, Leon Harris, and John Vallone (production design).
1981	Ann Mollo (set decoration)	The French Lieutenant's Woman	Nominated	Shared with Assheton Gorton (production design).
1981	Patrizia von Brandenstein (production design)	Ragtime	Nominated	Shared with John Graysmark and Tony Reading (production design); George DeTitta Sr., George DeTitta Jr. and Peter Howitt (set decoration).
1982	Linda DeScenna (set decoration)	Blade Runner	Nominated	Shared with Lawrence G. Paull and David Snyder (production design).
1983	Anna Asp (production design)	Fanny and Alexander	Won	First foreign language film to win in this category.
1983	Polly Platt (production design)	Terms of Endearment	Nominated	Shared with Harold Michelson (production design); Tom Pedigo and Anthony Mondell (set decoration).
1983	Tessa Davies (set decoration)	Yentl	Nominated	Shared with Roy Walker and Leslie Tomkins (production design).
1984	Patrizia von Brandenstein (production design)	Amadeus	Won	Shared with Karel Černý (production design).
1985	Josie MacAvin (set decoration)	Out of Africa	Won	Shared with Stephen B. Grimes (production design).
1985	Maggie Gray (set decoration)	Brazil	Nominated	Shared with Norman Garwood (production design).
1985	Linda DeScenna (set decoration)	The Color Purple	Nominated	Shared with J. Michael Riva and Bo Welch (production design).
1985	Shinobu Muraki (production design)	Ran	Nominated	First woman of color to be nominated for Best Production Design. Shared with Yoshiro Muraki (production design).
1986	Karen O'Hara (set decoration)	The Color of Money	Nominated	Shared with Boris Leven (production design).
1986	Carol Joffe (set decoration)	Hannah and Her Sisters	Nominated	Shared with Stuart Wurtzel (production design).
1987	Joanne Woollard (set decoration)	Hope and Glory	Nominated	Shared with Anthony D. G. Pratt (production design).
1987	Carol Joffe (set decoration)	Radio Days	Nominated	Shared with Santo Loquasto (production design); Leslie Bloom and George DeTitta Jr. (set decoration).
1987	Patrizia von Brandenstein (production design)	The Untouchables	Nominated	Shared with William A. Elliott (production design); Hal Gausman (set decoration).
1988	Ida Random (production design); Linda DeScenna (set decoration)	Rain Man	Nominated	
1989	Anne Kuljian (set decoration)	The Abyss	Nominated	Shared with Leslie Dilley (production design).
1989	Francesca Lo Schiavo (set decoration)	The Adventures of Baron Munchausen	Nominated	Shared with Dante Ferretti (production design).
1990	Lisa Dean (set decoration)	Dances with Wolves	Nominated	Shared with Jeffrey Beecroft (production design).
1990	Francesca Lo Schiavo (set decoration)	Hamlet	Nominated	Shared with Dante Ferretti (production design).
1991	Nancy Haigh (set decoration)	Bugsy	Won	Shared with Dennis Gassner (production design).
1991	Nancy Haigh (set decoration)	Barton Fink	Nominated	Shared with Dennis Gassner (production design).
1991	Cindy Carr (set decoration)	The Fisher King	Nominated	Shared with Mel Bourne (production design).
1991	Caryl Heller (set decoration)	The Prince of Tides	Nominated	Shared with Paul Sylbert (production design).
1992	Luciana Arrighi (production design)	Howards End	Won	Shared with Ian Whittaker (set decoration).
1992	Linda DeScenna (set decoration)	Toys	Nominated	Shared with Ferdinando Scarfiotti (production design).
1992	Janice Blackie-Goodine (set decoration)	Unforgiven	Nominated	Shared with Henry Bumstead (production design).
1993	Ewa Braun (set decoration)	Schindler's List	Won	Shared with Allan Starski (production design).
1993	Luciana Arrighi (production design)	The Remains of the Day	Nominated	Shared with Ian Whittaker (set decoration).
1994 (Note: All five films nominated for Best Production Design this year featured female production designers and/or set decorators.)	Carolyn Scott (set decoration)	The Madness of King George	Won	Shared with Ken Adam (production design).
1994	Susan Bode (set decoration)	Bullets over Broadway	Nominated	Shared Santo Loquasto (production design).
1994	Nancy Haigh (set decoration)	Forrest Gump	Nominated	Shared with Rick Carter (production design).
1994	Francesca Lo Schiavo (set decoration)	Interview with the Vampire	Nominated	Shared with Dante Ferretti (production design).
1994	Lilly Kilvert (production design); Dorree Cooper (set decoration)	Legends of the Fall	Nominated	
1995	Merideth Boswell (set decoration)	Apollo 13	Nominated	Shared with Michael Corenblith (production design).
1995	Kerrie Brown (set decoration)	Babe	Nominated	Shared with Roger Ford (production design).
1995	Cheryl Carasik (set decoration)	A Little Princess	Nominated	Shared with Bo Welch (production design).
1996	Stephenie McMillan (set decoration)	The English Patient	Won	Shared with Stuart Craig (production design).
1996	Cheryl Carasik (set decoration)	The Birdcage	Nominated	Shared with Bo Welch (production design).
1996	Catherine Martin (production design); Brigitte Broch (set decoration)	Romeo + Juliet	Nominated	
1997	Nancy Nye (set decoration)	Gattaca	Nominated	Shared with Jan Roelfs (production design).
1997	Francesca Lo Schiavo (set decoration)	Kundun	Nominated	Shared with Dante Ferretti (production design).
1997	Jeannine Oppewall (production design)	L.A. Confidential	Nominated	Shared with Jay Hart (set decoration).
1997	Cheryl Carasik (set decoration)	Men in Black	Nominated	Shared with Bo Welch (production design).
1998	Jill Quertier (set decoration)	Shakespeare in Love	Won	Shared with Martin Childs (production design).
1998	Jeannine Oppewall (production design)	Pleasantville	Nominated	Shared with Jay Hart (set decoration).
1998	Lisa Dean Kavanaugh (set decoration)	Saving Private Ryan	Nominated	Shared with Thomas E. Sanders (production design).
1998	Cindy Carr (set decoration)	What Dreams May Come	Nominated	Shared with Eugenio Zanetti (production design).
1999	Luciana Arrighi (production design)	Anna and the King	Nominated	Shared with Ian Whittaker (set decoration).
1999	Beth Rubino (set decoration)	The Cider House Rules	Nominated	Shared with David Gropman (production design).
1999	Eve Stewart (production design)	Topsy-Turvy	Nominated	Shared with John Bush (set decoration).
2000	Merideth Boswell (set decoration)	How the Grinch Stole Christmas	Nominated	Shared with Michael Corenblith (production design).
2000	Jill Quertier (set decoration)	Quills	Nominated	Shared with Martin Childs (production design).
2000	Françoise Benoît-Fresco (set decoration)	Vatel	Nominated	Shared with Jean Rabasse (production design).
2001	Catherine Martin (production design); Brigitte Broch (set decoration)	Moulin Rouge!	Won	
2001	Aline Bonetto (production design); Marie-Laure Valla (set decoration)	Amélie	Nominated	
2001	Anna Pinnock (set decoration)	Gosford Park	Nominated	Shared with Stephen Altman (production design).
2001	Stephenie McMillan (set decoration)	Harry Potter and the Philosopher's Stone	Nominated	Shared with Stuart Craig (production design).
2002	Hania Robledo (set decoration)	Frida	Nominated	Shared with Felipe Fernández del Paso (production design).
2002	Francesca Lo Schiavo (set decoration)	Gangs of New York	Nominated	Shared with Dante Ferretti (production design).
2002	Nancy Haigh (set decoration)	Road to Perdition	Nominated	Shared with Dennis Gassner (production design).
2003	Cecile Heideman (set decoration)	Girl with a Pearl Earring	Nominated	Shared with Ben Van Os (production design).
2003	Lilly Kilvert (production design); Gretchen Rau (set decoration)	The Last Samurai	Nominated	
2003	Jeannine Oppewall (production design); Leslie Pope (set decoration)	Seabiscuit	Nominated	
2004	Francesca Lo Schiavo (set decoration)	The Aviator	Won	Shared with Dante Ferretti (production design).
2004	Gemma Jackson (production design); Trisha Edwards (set decoration)	Finding Neverland	Nominated	
2004	Cheryl Carasik (set decoration)	Lemony Snicket's A Series of Unfortunate Events	Nominated	Shared with Rick Heinrichs (production design).
2004	Celia Bobak (set decoration)	The Phantom of the Opera	Nominated	Shared with Anthony D. G. Pratt (production design).
2004	Aline Bonetto (production design)	A Very Long Engagement	Nominated	
2005	Gretchen Rau (set decoration)	Memoirs of a Geisha	Won	Shared with John Myhre (production design).
2005	Jan Pascale (set decoration)	Good Night, and Good Luck.	Nominated	Shared with James D. Bissell (production design).
2005	Stephenie McMillan (set decoration)	Harry Potter and the Goblet of Fire	Nominated	Shared with Stuart Craig (production design).
2005	Sarah Greenwood (production design); Katie Spencer (set decoration)	Pride & Prejudice	Nominated	
2006	Pilar Revuelta (set decoration)	Pan's Labyrinth	Won	Shared with Eugenio Caballero (production design).
2006	Nancy Haigh (set decoration)	Dreamgirls	Nominated	Shared with John Myhre (production design).
2006	Jeannine Oppewall (production design); Gretchen Rau (set decoration)	The Good Shepherd	Nominated	Posthumous nomination for Rau. Shared with Leslie E. Rollins (set decoration).
2006	Cheryl Carasik (set decoration)	Pirates of the Caribbean: Dead Man's Chest	Nominated	Shared with Rick Heinrichs (production design).
2006	Julie Ochipinti (set decoration)	The Prestige	Nominated	Shared with Nathan Crowley (production design).
2007	Francesca Lo Schiavo (set decoration)	Sweeney Todd: The Demon Barber of Fleet Street	Won	First woman with multiple wins in this category. Shared with Dante Ferretti (production design).
2007	Beth Rubino (set decoration)	American Gangster	Nominated	Shared with Arthur Max (production design).
2007	Sarah Greenwood (production design); Katie Spencer (set decoration)	Atonement	Nominated	
2007	Anna Pinnock (set decoration)	The Golden Compass	Nominated	Shared with Dennis Gassner (production design).
2008	Rebecca Alleway (set decoration)	The Duchess	Nominated	Shared with Michael Carlin (production design).
2008	Kristi Zea (production design); Debra Schutt (set decoration)	Revolutionary Road	Nominated	
2009	Anastasia Masaro (production design); Caroline Smith (set decoration)	The Imaginarium of Doctor Parnassus	Nominated	Shared with Dave Warren (production design).
2009	Sarah Greenwood (production design); Katie Spencer (set decoration)	Sherlock Holmes	Nominated	
2009	Maggie Gray (set decoration)	The Young Victoria	Nominated	Shared with Patrice Vermette (production design).
2010	Karen O'Hara (set decoration)	Alice in Wonderland	Won	Shared with Robert Stromberg (production design).
2010	Stephenie McMillan (set decoration)	Harry Potter and the Deathly Hallows – Part 1	Nominated	Shared with Stuart Craig (production design).
2010	Eve Stewart (production design); Judy Farr (set decoration)	The King's Speech	Nominated	
2010	Nancy Haigh (set decoration)	True Grit	Nominated	Shared with Jess Gonchor (production design).
2011	Francesca Lo Schiavo (set decoration)	Hugo	Won	Shared with Dante Ferretti (production design).
2011	Stephenie McMillan (set decoration)	Harry Potter and the Deathly Hallows – Part 2	Nominated	Shared with Stuart Craig (production design).
2011	Anne Seibel (production design); Hélène Dubreuil (set decoration)	Midnight in Paris	Nominated	
2012	Sarah Greenwood (production design); Katie Spencer (set decoration)	Anna Karenina	Nominated	
2012	Eve Stewart (production design); Anna Lynch-Robinson (set decoration)	Les Misérables	Nominated	
2012	Anna Pinnock (set decoration)	Life of Pi	Nominated	Shared with David Gropman (production design).
2013	Catherine Martin (production design); Beverley Dunn (set decoration)	The Great Gatsby	Won	
2013	Alice Baker (set decoration)	12 Years a Slave	Nominated	Shared with Adam Stockhausen (production design).
2013	Judy Becker (production design); Heather Loeffler (set decoration)	American Hustle	Nominated	
2013	Rosie Goodwin and Joanne Woollard (set decoration)	Gravity	Nominated	Shared with Andy Nicholson (production design).
2014	Anna Pinnock (set decoration)	The Grand Budapest Hotel	Won	Shared with Adam Stockhausen (production design).
2014	Maria Djurkovic (production design); Tatiana Macdonald (set decoration)	The Imitation Game	Nominated	
2014	Anna Pinnock (set decoration)	Into the Woods	Nominated	Shared with Dennis Gassner (production design).
2014	Suzie Davies (production design); Charlotte Watts (set decoration)	Mr. Turner	Nominated	
2015	Lisa Thompson (set decoration)	Mad Max: Fury Road	Won	Shared with Colin Gibson (production design).
2015	Rena DeAngelo (set decoration)	Bridge of Spies	Nominated	Shared with Adam Stockhausen (production design); Bernhard Henrich (set decoration).
2015	Eve Stewart (production design)	The Danish Girl	Nominated	Shared with Michael Standish (set decoration).
2015	Celia Bobak (set decoration)	The Martian	Nominated	Shared with Arthur Max (production design).
2016	Sandy Reynolds-Wasco (set decoration)	La La Land	Won	Shared with David Wasco (production design).
2016	Anna Pinnock (set decoration)	Fantastic Beasts and Where to Find Them	Nominated	Shared with Stuart Craig (production design).
2016	Nancy Haigh (set decoration)	Hail, Caesar!	Nominated	Shared with Jess Gonchor (production design).
2017	Sarah Greenwood (production design); Katie Spencer (set decoration)	Beauty and the Beast	Nominated	
2017	Alessandra Querzola (set decoration)	Blade Runner 2049	Nominated	Shared with Dennis Gassner (production design).
2017	Sarah Greenwood (production design); Katie Spencer (set decoration)	Darkest Hour	Nominated	
2018	Hannah Beachler (production design)	Black Panther	Won	First African-American and black woman to win and be nominated for Best Production Design. Shared with Jay Hart (set decoration).
2018	Fiona Crombie (production design); Alice Felton (set decoration)	The Favourite	Nominated	
2018	Kathy Lucas (set decoration)	First Man	Nominated	Shared with Nathan Crowley (production design).
2018	Bárbara Enríquez (set decoration)	Roma	Nominated	Shared with Eugenio Caballero (production design).
2019	Barbara Ling (production design); Nancy Haigh (set decoration)	Once Upon a Time in Hollywood	Won	
2019	Regina Graves (set decoration)	The Irishman	Nominated	Shared with Bob Shaw (production design).
2019	Nora Sopková (set decoration)	Jojo Rabbit	Nominated	Shared with Ra Vincent (production design).
2020	Jan Pascale (set decoration)	Mank	Won	Shared with Donald Graham Burt (production design).
2020	Cathy Featherstone (set decoration)	The Father	Nominated	Shared with Peter Francis (production design).
2020	Karen O'Hara and Diana Stoughton (set decoration)	Ma Rainey's Black Bottom	Nominated	Shared with Mark Ricker (production design).
2020	Elizabeth Keenan (set decoration)	News of the World	Nominated	Shared with David Crank (production design).
2020	Kathy Lucas (set decoration)	Tenet	Nominated	Shared with Nathan Crowley (production design).
2021	Zsuzsanna Sipos (set decoration)	Dune	Won	Shared with Patrice Vermette (production design).
2021	Tamara Deverell (production design)	Nightmare Alley	Nominated	Shared with Shane Vieau (set decoration).
2021	Amber Richards (set decoration)	The Power of the Dog	Nominated	Shared with Grant Major (production design).
2021	Nancy Haigh (set decoration)	The Tragedy of Macbeth	Nominated	Shared with Stefan Dechant (production design).
2021	Rena DeAngelo (set decoration)	West Side Story	Nominated	Shared with Adam Stockhausen (production design).
2022	Ernestine Hipper (set decoration)	All Quiet on the Western Front	Won	Shared with Christian M. Goldbeck (production design).
2022	Vanessa Cole (set decoration)	Avatar: The Way of Water	Nominated	Shared with Dylan Cole and Ben Procter (production design).
2022	Florencia Martin (production design)	Babylon	Nominated	Shared with Anthony Carlino (set decoration).
2022	Catherine Martin and Karen Murphy (production design); Bev Dunn (set decoration)	Elvis	Nominated	
2022	Karen O'Hara (set decoration)	The Fabelmans	Nominated	Shared with Rick Carter (production design).
2023	Shona Heath (production design); Zsuzsa Mihalek (set decoration)	Poor Things	Won	Shared with James Price (production design).
2023	Sarah Greenwood (production design); Katie Spencer (set decoration)	Barbie	Nominated	
2023	Elli Griff (set decoration)	Napoleon	Nominated	Shared with Arthur Max (production design).
2023	Ruth De Jong (production design); Claire Kaufman (set decoration)	Oppenheimer	Nominated	
2024	Judy Becker (production design); Patricia Cuccia (set decoration)	The Brutalist	Nominated	
2024	Suzie Davies (production design); Cynthia Sleiter (set decoration)	Conclave	Nominated	
2024	Beatrice Brentnerová (set decoration)	Nosferatu	Nominated	Shared with Craig Lathrop (production design).
2025	Tamara Deverell (production design)	Frankenstein	Won	Shared with Shane Vieau (set decoration).
2025	Fiona Crombie (production design); Alice Felton (set decoration)	Hamnet	Nominated	
2025	Florencia Martin (production design)	One Battle After Another	Nominated	Shared with Anthony Carlino (set decoration).
2025	Hannah Beachler (production design); Monique Champagne (set decoration)	Sinners	Nominated	Beachler was the first African-American and woman of color with multiple nominations in this category.

== Best Short Film (Animated) ==
Academy Award for Best Animated Short Film
Year	Name	Film	Status	Notes
1962	Faith Hubley	The Hole	Won	First woman to win and be nominated for Best Animated Short Film. First woman with multiple wins and nominations in this category. Shared with John Hubley.
1966	Faith Hubley	Herb Alpert and the Tijuana Brass Double Feature	Won	First woman to win and be nominated for Best Animated Short Film. First woman with multiple wins and nominations in this category. Shared with John Hubley.
1968	Faith Hubley	Windy Day	Nominated	First woman to win and be nominated for Best Animated Short Film. First woman with multiple wins and nominations in this category. Shared with John Hubley.
1969	Faith Hubley	Of Men and Demons	Nominated	First woman to win and be nominated for Best Animated Short Film. First woman with multiple wins and nominations in this category. Shared with John Hubley.
1974	Faith Hubley	Voyage to Next	Nominated	First woman to win and be nominated for Best Animated Short Film. First woman with multiple wins and nominations in this category. Shared with John Hubley.
1976	Suzanne Baker	Leisure	Won	
1976	Caroline Leaf	The Street	Nominated	Shared with Guy Glover.
1977	Faith Hubley	The Doonesbury Special	Nominated	Shared with John Hubley and Garry Trudeau.
1978	Eunice Macaulay	Special Delivery	Won	Shared with John Weldon.
1981	Janet Perlman	The Tender Tale of Cinderella Penguin	Nominated	
1982	Dianne Jackson	The Snowman	Nominated	
1983	Eda Godel Hallinan	Sound of Sunshine - Sound of Rain	Nominated	
1985	Cilia van Dijk	Anna & Bella	Won	
1985	Alison Snowden	Second Class Mail	Nominated	
1986	Linda Van Tulden	A Greek Tragedy	Won	Shared with Willem Thijsen.
1987	Eunice Macaulay	George and Rosemary	Nominated	
1991	Wendy Tilby	Strings	Nominated	
1992	Joan C. Gratz	Mona Lisa Descending a Staircase	Won	
1992	Michaela Pavlátová	Reci, Reci, Reci...	Nominated	
1994	Alison Snowden	Bob's Birthday	Won	Shared with David Fine.
1994	Vanessa Schwartz	The Janitor	Nominated	First Latina to be nominated for Best Animated Short Film.
1994	Erica Russell	Triangle	Nominated	
1997	Joanna Quinn	Famous Fred	Nominated	
1999	Torill Kove	My Grandmother Ironed the King's Shirts	Nominated	
1999	Wendy Tilby; Amanda Forbis	When the Day Breaks	Nominated	
2000	Annette Schäffler	Periwig Maker	Nominated	Shared with Steffen Schäffler.
2002	Heidi Wittlinger	Das Rad	Nominated	Shared with Chris Stenner.
2005	Peggy Stern	The Moon and the Son: An Imagined Conversation	Won	Shared with John Canemaker.
2005	Sharon Colman	Badgered	Nominated	
2006	Torill Kove	The Danish Poet	Won	
2007	Suzie Templeton	Peter & the Wolf	Won	Shared with Hugh Welchman.
2011	Sue Goffe	A Morning Stroll	Nominated	
2011	Wendy Tilby; Amanda Forbis	Wild Life	Nominated	
2012	Fodhla Cronin O'Reilly	Head Over Heels	Nominated	Shared with Timothy Reckart.
2013	Lauren MacMullan; Dorothy McKim	Get a Horse!	Nominated	
2014	Kristina Reed	Feast	Won	Shared with Patrick Osborne.
2014	Daisy Jacobs	The Bigger Picture	Nominated	Shared with Christopher Hees.
2014	Torill Kove	Me and My Moulton	Nominated	
2015	Imogen Sutton	Prologue	Nominated	Shared with Richard Williams.
2015	Nicole Paradis Grindle	Sanjay's Super Team	Nominated	Shared with Sanjay Patel.
2016	Cara Speller	Pear Cider and Cigarettes	Nominated	Shared with Robert Valley.
2017	Dana Murray	Lou	Nominated	Shared with Dave Mullins.
2017	Ru Kuwahata	Negative Space	Nominated	Shared with Max Porter.
2018	Domee Shi; Becky Neiman-Cobb	Bao	Won	
2018	Alison Snowden	Animal Behaviour	Nominated	Shared with David Fine.
2018	Louise Bagnall; Nuria González-Blanco	Late Afternoon	Nominated	
2019	Karen Rupert Toliver	Hair Love	Won	Shared with Matthew A. Cherry.
2019	Daria Kashcheeva	Daughter	Nominated	
2019	Rosana Sullivan; Kathryn Hendrickson	Kitbull	Nominated	
2019	Siqi Song	Sister	Nominated	
2020	Madeline Sharafian	Burrow	Nominated	Shared with Michael Capbarat.
2021	Joanna Quinn	Affairs of the Art	Nominated	Shared with Les Mills.
2022	Amanda Forbis; Wendy Tilby	The Flying Sailor	Nominated	
2022	Sara Gunnarsdóttir; Pamela Ribon	My Year of Dicks	Nominated	
2023	Tal Kantor	Letter to a Pig	Nominated	Shared with Amit R. Gicelter.
2023	Jerusha Hess	Ninety-Five Senses	Nominated	Shared with Jared Hess.
2023	Yegane Moghaddam	Our Uniform	Nominated	
2023	Stéphanie Clément	Pachyderme	Nominated	Shared with Marc Rius.
2024	Shirin Sohani	In the Shadow of the Cypress	Won	Shared with Hossein Molayemi.
2024	Nina Gantz; Stienette Bosklopper	Wander to Wonder	Nominated	
2024	Juliette Marquet	Yuck!	Nominated	Shared with Loïc Espuche.
2025	Florence Miailhe	Butterfly	Nominated	Shared with Ron Dyens.

== Best Short Film (Live Action) ==
Academy Award for Best Live Action Short Film
Year	Name	Film	Status	Notes
1959	Shirley Clarke	Skyscraper	Nominated	First woman to be nominated for Best Live Action Short Film. Shared with Willard Van Dyke and Irving Jacoby.
1962	Martina Huguenot van der Linden	Big City Blues	Nominated	Shared with Charles Huguenot van der Linden.
1969	Joan Keller Stern	The Magic Machines	Won	First woman to win for Best Live Action Short Film.
1976	Marjorie Anne Short	Kudzu	Nominated	
1976	Claire Wilbur	Nightlife	Nominated	Shared with Robin Lehman.
1976	Dyan Cannon	Number One	Nominated	Shared with Vince Cannon.
1977	Beverly Shaffer; Yuki Yoshida	I'll Find a Way	Won	Yoshida was the first woman of color to win and be nominated in any non-acting category.
1978	Fern Field	A Different Approach	Nominated	Shared with Jim Belcher.
1979	Sarah Pillsbury	Board and Care	Won	Shared with Ron Ellis.
1979	Carol Lowell	Oh Brother, My Brother	Nominated	Shared with Ross Lowell.
1980	Sally Heckel	A Jury of Her Peers	Nominated	
1981	Shelley Levinson	Violet	Won	Shared with Paul Kemp.
1981	Christine Oestreicher	Couples and Robbers	Nominated	
1982	Christine Oestreicher	A Shocking Accident	Won	First woman with multiple nominations in this category.
1983	Janice L. Platt	Boys and Girls	Won	
1984	Janice L. Platt	The Painted Door	Nominated	Shared with Michael MacMillan.
1984	Sharon Oreck; Lesli Linka Glatter	Tales of Meeting and Parting	Nominated	
1985	Dianna Costello	Graffiti	Nominated	
1986	Fredda Weiss	Love Struck	Nominated	
1987	Jana Sue Memel	Ray's Male Heterosexual Dance Hall	Won	Shared with Jonathan Sanger.
1987	Ann Wingate	Making Waves	Nominated	
1988	Matia Karrell; Abbee Goldstein	Cadillac Dreams	Nominated	
1990	Hillary Ripps	12:01 PM	Nominated	Shared with Jonathan Heap.
1992	Jana Sue Memel	Contact	Nominated	Shared with Jonathan Darby.
1993	Stacy Title	Down on the Waterfront	Nominated	Shared with Jonathan Penner.
1993	Susan Seidelman	The Dutch Master	Nominated	Shared with Jonathan Brett.
1993	Jana Sue Memel	Partners	Nominated	Shared with Peter Weller.
1994	Ruth Kenley-Letts	Franz Kafka's It's a Wonderful Life	Won	Shared with Peter Capaldi. Tied with Trevor.
1994	Peggy Rajski	Trevor	Won	Shared with Randy Stone. Tied with Franz Kafka's It's a Wonderful Life.
1994	Christine Astin	Kangaroo Court	Nominated	Shared with Sean Astin.
1994	JoBeth Williams; Michele McGuire	On Hope	Nominated	
1995	Christine Lahti; Jana Sue Memel	Lieberman in Love	Won	Memel was the first woman with multiple wins in this category.
1995	Tikki Goldberg	Little Surprises	Nominated	Shared with Jeff Goldblum.
1995	Dianne Houston; Joy Ryan	Tuesday Morning Ride	Nominated	Houston was the first Black woman to be nominated for Best Live Action Short Film.
1996	Bernadette Carranza	Wordless	Nominated	Shared with Antonello De Leo.
1998	Vivian Goffette	La Carte Postale (The Postcard)	Nominated	
1999	Barbara Schock; Tamara Tiehel	My Mother Dreams the Satan's Disciples in New York	Won	
1999	Gabriele Lins	Kleingeld	Nominated	Shared with Marc-Andreas Bochert.
2000	Ericka Frederick	By Courier	Nominated	Shared with Peter Riegert.
2000	Joan Stein; Christina Lazaridi	One Day Crossing	Nominated	
2000	Gail Lerner	Seraglio	Nominated	Shared with Colin Campbell.
2001	Lisa Blount	The Accountant	Won	Shared with Ray McKinnon.
2001	Shameela Bakhsh	Speed for Thespians	Nominated	Shared with Kalman Apple.
2002	Mie Andreasen	Der Er En Yndig Man (This Charming Man)	Won	Shared with Martin Strange-Hansen.
2002	Anja Daelemans	Fait D'Hiver	Nominated	Shared with Dirk Beliën.
2002	Lexi Alexander	Johnny Flynton	Nominated	Shared with Alexander Buono.
2004	Andrea Arnold	Wasp	Won	
2004	Ainsley Gardiner	Two Cars, One Night	Nominated	Shared with Taika Waititi.
2005	Ulrike Grote	Ausreisser (The Runaway)	Nominated	
2005	Lene Bausager	Cashback	Nominated	Shared with Sean Ellis.
2005	Pia Clemente	Our Time Is Up	Nominated	Shared with Rob Pearlstein.
2007	Louise Vesth	At Night	Nominated	Shared with Christian E. Christiansen.
2007	Anja Daelemans	Tanghi Argentini	Nominated	Shared with Guido Thys.
2008	Elizabeth Marre	Manon on the Asphalt	Nominated	Shared with Olivier Pont.
2008	Steph Green; Tamara Anghie	New Boy	Nominated	
2008	Dorte Høgh	The Pig	Nominated	Shared with Tivi Magnusson.
2009	Juanita Wilson	The Door	Nominated	Shared with James Flynn.
2010	Samantha Waite	Wish 143	Nominated	Shared with Ian Barnes.
2011	Oorlagh George	The Shore	Won	Shared with Terry George.
2011	Eimear O'Kane	Pentecost	Nominated	Shared with Peter McDonald.
2011	Gigi Causey	Time Freak	Nominated	Shared with Andrew Bowler.
2012	Ellen De Waele	Dood van een Schaduw (Death of a Shadow)	Nominated	Shared with Tom Van Avermaet.
2013	Selma Vilhunen; Kirsikka Saari	Pitääkö Mun Kaikki Hoitaa? (Do I Have to Take Care of Everything?)	Nominated	
2014	Mihal Brezis	Aya	Nominated	Shared with Oded Binnun.
2014	Talkhon Hamzavi	Parvaneh	Nominated	Shared with Stefan Eichenberger.
2015	Serena Armitage	Stutterer	Won	Shared with Benjamin Cleary.
2016	Anna Udvardy	Sing	Won	Shared with Kristóf Deák.
2017	Rachel Shenton	The Silent Child	Won	Shared with Chris Overton.
2017	Katja Benrath	Watu Wore: All of Us	Nominated	Shared with Tobias Rosen.
2018	Jaime Ray Newman	Skin	Won	Shared with Guy Nattiv.
2018	Maria Gracia Turgeon	Fauve	Nominated	Shared with Jeremy Comte.
2018	Marianne Farley; Marie-Hélène Panisset	Marguerite	Nominated	Shared with Tobias Rosen.
2018	María del Puy Alvarado	Mother	Nominated	Shared with Rodrigo Sorogoyen.
2019	Meryam Joobeur; Maria Gracia Turgeon	Brotherhood	Nominated	
2019	Delphine Girard	A Sister	Nominated	
2020	Susan Ruzenski	Feeling Through	Nominated	Shared with Doug Roland.
2020	Elvira Lind; Sofia Sondervan	The Letter Room	Nominated	
2020	Farah Nabulsi	The Present	Nominated	
2020	Shira Hochman	White Eye	Nominated	Shared with Tomer Shushan.
2021	Maria Brendle; Nadine Lüchinger	Ala Kachuu – Take and Run	Nominated	
2021	K.D. Dávila	Please Hold	Nominated	First Latina to be nominated for Best Live Action Short Film. Shared with Levin Menekse.
2022	Rebecca Pruzan	Ivalu	Nominated	Shared with Anders Walter.
2022	Alice Rohrwacher	Le pupille	Nominated	Shared with Alfonso Cuarón.
2023	Nicky Bentham	The After	Nominated	Shared with Misan Harriman.
2023	Nazrin Choudhury; Sara McFarlane	Red, White and Blue	Nominated	
2024	Victoria Warmerdam	I'm Not a Robot	Won	Shared with Trent.
2024	Suchitra Mattai	Anuja	Nominated	Shared with Adam J. Graves.
2024	Cindy Lee	The Last Ranger	Nominated	Shared with Darwin Shaw.
2025	Natalie Musteata	Two People Exchanging Saliva	Won	Shared with Alexandre Singh. Tied with Sam A. Davis and Jack Piatt for The Singers
2025	Julia Aks	Jane Austen's Period Drama	Nominated	Shared with Steve Pinder.

== Best Sound ==
Academy Award for Best Sound (Note: This category was re-introduced at the 93rd Academy Awards by merging two previously separate categories for Best Sound Mixing and Best Sound Editing into a single Best Sound category.)
Sound Editing
Year	Name	Film	Status	Notes
1984	Kay Rose	The River	Won	First and only woman to receive the non-competitive Special Achievement Academy Award (Sound Effects Editing).
1986	Cecelia Hall	Top Gun	Nominated	First woman to be nominated for the competitive Best Sound Effects Editing. Shared with George Watters II.
1990	Cecelia Hall	The Hunt for Red October	Won	First woman to win the competitive Best Sound Effects Editing. First woman with multiple nominations in sound categories. Shared with George Watters II.
1991	Gloria Borders	Terminator 2: Judgment Day	Won	Shared with Gary Rydstrom.
1994	Gloria Borders	Forrest Gump	Nominated	Shared with Randy Thom.
Sound Mixing
1995	Anna Behlmer	Braveheart	Nominated	First woman to be nominated for Best Sound Mixing. Shared with Andy Nelson, Scott Millan, and Brian Simmons.
1996	Anna Behlmer	Evita	Nominated	First woman with multiple nominations for Best Sound Mixing. Shared with Andy Nelson and Ken Weston.
1997	Anna Behlmer	L.A. Confidential	Nominated	Shared with Andy Nelson and Kirk Francis.
1998	Pud Cusack	The Mask of Zorro	Nominated	Shared with Kevin O'Connell and Greg P. Russell.
1998	Anna Behlmer	The Thin Red Line	Nominated	Shared with Andy Nelson and Paul Brincat.
2001	Anna Behlmer	Moulin Rouge!	Nominated	Shared with Andy Nelson, Roger Savage, and Guntis Sics.
2003	Anna Behlmer	The Last Samurai	Nominated	Shared with Andy Nelson and Jeff Wexler.
2003	Anna Behlmer	Seabiscuit	Nominated	Shared with Andy Nelson and Tod A. Maitland.
2005	Anna Behlmer	War of the Worlds	Nominated	Shared with Andy Nelson and Ron Judkins.
2006	Anna Behlmer	Blood Diamond	Nominated	Shared with Andy Nelson and Ivan Sharrock.
Sound Editing
2007	Karen Baker Landers	The Bourne Ultimatum	Won	Shared with Per Hallberg.
Sound Mixing
2008	Lora Hirschberg	The Dark Knight	Nominated	Shared with Gary Rizzo and Ed Novick.
2009	Sound Mixing			
2009	Anna Behlmer	Star Trek	Nominated	Shared with Andy Nelson and Peter J. Devlin.
2009	Sound Editing			
2009	Gwendolyn Yates Whittle	Avatar	Nominated	Shared with Christopher Boyes.
2010	Sound Mixing			
2010	Lora Hirschberg	Inception	Won	First woman to win for Best Sound Mixing. Shared with Gary Rizzo and Ed Novick.
2010	Sound Editing			
2010	Gwendolyn Yates Whittle	Tron: Legacy	Nominated	Shared with Addison Teague.
Sound Mixing
2011	Deb Adair	Moneyball	Nominated	Shared with Ron Bochar, Dave Giammarco, and Ed Novick.
Sound Editing
2012	Karen Baker Landers	Skyfall	Won	First woman with multiple wins in sound categories. Shared with Per Hallberg. Tied with Paul N. J. Ottosson for Zero Dark Thirty
2014	Becky Sullivan	Unbroken	Nominated	Shared with Andrew DeCristofaro.
2016	Sound Mixing			
2016	Renée Tondelli	Deepwater Horizon	Nominated	Shared with Wylie Stateman.
2016	Ai-Ling Lee	La La Land	Nominated	First woman of color to be nominated in sound categories. First woman to be nominated in both sound categories and in the same year. Shared with Andy Nelson and Steven A. Morrow.
2016	Sound Editing			
2016	Ai-Ling Lee; Mildred Iatrou Morgan	La La Land	Nominated	Lee was the first woman of color to be nominated in sound categories. Lee was the first woman to be nominated in both sound categories and in the same year.
Sound Mixing
2017	Mary H. Ellis	Baby Driver	Nominated	Shared with Julian Slater and Tim Cavagin.
2018	Sound Mixing			
2018	Ai-Ling Lee; Mary H. Ellis	First Man	Nominated	Shared with Jon Taylor and Frank A. Montaño.
2018	Sound Editing			
2018	Nina Hartstone	Bohemian Rhapsody	Won	Shared with John Warhurst.
2018	Ai-Ling Lee; Mildred Iatrou Morgan	First Man	Nominated	
Sound Editing
2019	Rachael Tate	1917	Nominated	Shared with Oliver Tarney.
Sound
2020	Michelle Couttolenc	Sound of Metal	Won	Shared with Nicolas Becker, Jaime Baksht, Carlos Cortés Navarrete, and Phillip Bladh.
2020	Coya Elliott	Soul	Nominated	Shared with Ren Klyce and David Parker.
2021	Denise Yarde	Belfast	Nominated	First Black woman to be nominated for Best Sound. Shared with Simon Chase, James Mather and Niv Adiri.
2021	Tara Webb	The Power of the Dog	Nominated	Shared with Richard Flynn and Robert Mackenzie.
2022	Gwendolyn Yates Whittle	Avatar: The Way of Water	Nominated	Shared with Julian Howarth, Dick Bernstein, Christopher Boyes, Gary Summers, and Michael Hedges.
2024	Nancy Nugent Title	Wicked	Nominated	Shared with Simon Hayes, Jack Dolman, Andy Nelson, and John Marquis.
2025	Gwendolyn Yates Whittle	F1	Won	Shared with Gareth John, Al Nelson, Gary A. Rizzo and Juan Peralta.
2025	Amanda Villavieja; Laia Casanovas; Yasmina Praderas	Sirāt	Nominated	

== Best Visual Effects ==
Academy Award for Best Visual Effects
Year	Name	Film	Status	Notes
1986	Suzanne M. Benson	Aliens	Won	First woman to win and be nominated for Best Visual Effects. Shared with Robert Skotak, Stan Winston, and John Richardson.
1993	Pamela Easley	Cliffhanger	Nominated	Shared with Neil Krepela, John Richardson, and John Bruno.
2015	Sara Bennett	Ex Machina	Won	Shared with Mark Ardington, Paul Norris, and Andrew Whitehurst.
2020	Genevieve Camilleri	Love and Monsters	Nominated	Shared with Matt Sloan, Brian Cox, and Matt Everitt.
2023	Kiyoko Shibuya	Godzilla Minus One	Won	First woman of color to win and be nominated for Best Visual Effects. Shared with Takashi Yamazaki, Masaki Takahashi, and Tatsuji Nojima. First foreign language film to win in this category.
2025	Charmaine Chan	Jurassic World Rebirth	Nominated	Shared with David Vickery, Stephen Aplin, and Neil Corbould.

== Best Writing (Adapted Screenplay) ==
Academy Award for Best Adapted Screenplay
Year	Name	Film	Source Material	Status	Notes
1928-29 (Note: The only occasion where there were no official nominees. Subsequent research by AMPAS has resulted in a list of unofficial or de facto nominees.) (Note: During this year, the award was bestowed as Best Writing and included both original and adapted screenplays.)	Josephine Lovett	Our Dancing Daughters	– (original)	Nominated	Among the first women to be nominated in writing categories.
1928-29	Bess Meredyth	A Woman of Affairs	The novel The Green Hat by Michael Arlen	Nominated	First woman with multiple nominations in any category. Among the first women to be nominated in writing categories. One of only three women among 36 founding members of the Academy of Motion Picture Arts and Sciences.
1928-29	Bess Meredyth	Wonder of Women	The novel Die Frau des Steffen Tromholt by Hermann Sudermann	Nominated	First woman with multiple nominations in any category. Among the first women to be nominated in writing categories. One of only three women among 36 founding members of the Academy of Motion Picture Arts and Sciences.
1929-30	Frances Marion	The Big House	– (original)	Won	First woman to win in writing categories. First person with multiple wins in writing categories (for further information, see Best Original Story).
1932-33	Sarah Y. Mason	Little Women	The novel by Louisa May Alcott	Won	First woman to win for adaptation from previously established material. Shared with Victor Heerman.
1932-33	Sonya Levien	State Fair	The novel by Phil Stong	Nominated	Shared with Paul Green.
1934	Frances Goodrich	The Thin Man	The novel by Dashiell Hammett	Nominated	Shared with Albert Hackett.
1936	Frances Goodrich	After the Thin Man	The novel The Thin Man by Dashiell Hammett	Nominated	Shared with Albert Hackett.
1937	Viña Delmar	The Awful Truth	The play by Arthur Richman	Nominated	
1937	Dorothy Parker	A Star Is Born	A story by William A. Wellman & Robert Carson	Nominated	Shared with Alan Campbell and Carson.
1938	Elizabeth Hill	The Citadel	The novel by A. J. Cronin	Nominated	Shared with Ian Dalrymple and Frank Wead.
1938	Lenore Coffee	Four Daughters	The short story Sister Act by Fannie Hurst	Nominated	Shared with Julius J. Epstein.
1939	Claudine West	Goodbye, Mr. Chips	The novella by James Hilton	Nominated	Shared with R.C. Sherriff and Eric Maschwitz.
1940	Joan Harrison	Rebecca	The novel by Daphne du Maurier	Nominated	First woman to be nominated in the same year in two separate writing categories (For the further information, see Best Original Screenplay). Shared with Robert E. Sherwood.
1941	Lillian Hellman	The Little Foxes	The play by Hellman	Nominated	First woman to be nominated for adapting her own work.
1942	Claudine West	Mrs. Miniver	The character Mrs. Miniver from the newspaper columns by Jan Struther	Won	Shared with George Froeschel, James Hilton, and Arthur Wimperis.
1942	Claudine West	Random Harvest	The novel by James Hilton	Nominated	Shared with George Froeschel and Arthur Wimperis.
1944	Elizabeth Reinhardt	Laura	The novel by Vera Caspary	Nominated	Shared with Jay Dratler and Samuel Hoffenstein.
1945	Tess Slesinger	A Tree Grows in Brooklyn	The novel by Betty Smith	Nominated	First woman to be posthumously nominated in a non-acting category. Shared with Frank Davis.
1946	Sally Benson	Anna and the King of Siam	The novel by Margaret Landon	Nominated	Shared with Talbot Jennings.
1948	Irma von Cube	Johnny Belinda	The play by Elmer Blaney Harris	Nominated	Shared with Allen Vincent.
1950	Frances Goodrich	Father of the Bride	The novel by Edward Streeter	Nominated	Shared with Albert Hackett.
1953	Helen Deutsch	Lili	The short story Love of Seven Dolls by Paul Gallico	Nominated	
1954	Frances Goodrich; Dorothy Kingsley	Seven Brides for Seven Brothers	The short story The Sobbin' Women by Stephen Vincent Benét	Nominated	Goodrich tied the record for most nominations without a win in this category, with four. Shared with Albert Hackett.
1955	Isobel Lennart	Love Me or Leave Me	A story by Daniel Fuchs	Nominated	Shared with Fuchs.
1960	Isobel Lennart	The Sundowners	The novel by Jon Cleary	Nominated	
1962	Eleanor Perry	David and Lisa	The novella Lisa and David by Theodore Isaac Rubin	Nominated	
1963	Phoebe Ephron	Captain Newman, M.D.	The novel by Leo Rosten	Nominated	Shared with Richard L. Breen and Henry Ephron.
1963	Harriet Frank Jr.	Hud	The novel Horseman, Pass By by Larry McMurtry	Nominated	Shared with Irving Ravetch.
1969	Bridget Boland	Anne of the Thousand Days	The play by Maxwell Anderson	Nominated	Shared with John Hale and Richard Sokolove.
1970	Renée Taylor	Lovers and Other Strangers	The play by Joseph Bologna & Taylor	Nominated	Shared with Bologna and David Zelag Goodman.
1972	Jay Presson Allen	Cabaret	The musical by Joe Masteroff	Nominated	
1975	Gladys Hill	The Man Who Would Be King	The short story by Rudyard Kipling	Nominated	Shared with John Huston.
1978	Elaine May	Heaven Can Wait	The play by Harry Segall	Nominated	Shared with Warren Beatty.
1979	Harriet Frank Jr.	Norma Rae	The book Crystal Lee, a Woman of Inheritance by Hank Leiferman	Nominated	Shared with Irving Ravetch.
1981	Jay Presson Allen	Prince of the City	The book Prince of the City: The True Story of a Cop Who Knew Too Much by Robert Daley	Nominated	Shared with Sidney Lumet.
1985	Janet Roach	Prizzi's Honor	The novel by Richard Condon	Nominated	Shared with Condon.
1986	Ruth Prawer Jhabvala	A Room with a View	The novel by E.M. Forster	Won	
1986	Hesper Anderson	Children of a Lesser God	The play by Mark Medoff	Nominated	Shared with Medoff.
1986	Beth Henley	Crimes of the Heart	The play by Henley	Nominated	
1988	Anna Hamilton Phelan	Gorillas in the Mist	The article by Harold Hayes	Nominated	Shared with Tab Murphy.
1988	Christine Edzard	Little Dorrit	The novel by Charles Dickens	Nominated	
1991	Agnieszka Holland	Europa Europa	The memoir I Was Hitler Youth Salomon by Solomon Perel	Nominated	
1991	Fannie Flagg; Carol Sobieski	Fried Green Tomatoes	The novel Fried Green Tomatoes at the Whistle Stop Cafe by Flagg	Nominated	Posthumous nomination for Sobieski.
1991	Pat Conroy; Becky Johnston	The Prince of Tides	The novel by Conroy	Nominated	
1992	Ruth Prawer Jhabvala	Howards End	The novel by E.M. Forster	Won	First woman with multiple wins in this category. Tied the record for most wins in this category, with two.
1993	Ruth Prawer Jhabvala	The Remains of the Day	The novel by Kazuo Ishiguro	Nominated	
1995	Emma Thompson	Sense and Sensibility	The novel by Jane Austen	Won	First and only person to win for acting (Best Actress for Howards End) and screenwriting. First woman to be nominated for acting (Best Actress for Sense and Sensibility) and screenwriting in the same year.
1995	Anna Pavignano	Il Postino	The novel Ardiente paciencia by Antonio Skármeta	Nominated	Shared with Michael Radford, Massimo Troisi, Furio Scarpelli, and Giacomo Scarpelli.
1997	Hilary Henkin	Wag the Dog	The novel American Hero by Larry Beinhart	Nominated	Shared with David Mamet.
1998	Elaine May	Primary Colors	The novel by Joe Klein	Nominated	
2000	Wang Hui-ling	Crouching Tiger, Hidden Dragon	The novel by Wang Dulu	Nominated	Shared with James Schamus and Kuo Jung Tsai.
2001	Fran Walsh; Philippa Boyens	The Lord of the Rings: The Fellowship of the Ring	The novel by J. R. R. Tolkien	Nominated	Shared with Peter Jackson.
2003	Fran Walsh; Philippa Boyens	The Lord of the Rings: The Return of the King	The novel by J. R. R. Tolkien	Won	Shared with Peter Jackson.
2003	Shari Springer Berman	American Splendor	The comic book series by Harvey Pekar & graphic novel Our Cancer Year by Pekar & Joyce Brabner	Nominated	Shared with Robert Pulcini.
2004	Julie Delpy; Kim Krizan	Before Sunset	Characters from the film Before Sunrise created by Richard Linklater & Krizan	Nominated	Shared with Ethan Hawke and Linklater.
2005	Diana Ossana	Brokeback Mountain	The short story by Annie Proulx	Won	Shared with Larry McMurtry.
2007	Sarah Polley	Away from Her	The short story The Bear Went Over the Mountain by Alice Munro	Nominated	
2008	Robin Swicord	The Curious Case of Benjamin Button	The short story by F. Scott Fitzgerald	Nominated	Shared with Eric Roth.
2009	Terri Tatchell	District 9	The short film Alive in Joburg written by Neill Blomkamp	Nominated	Shared with Blomkamp.
2010	Debra Granik; Anne Rosellini	Winter's Bone	The novel by Daniel Woodrell	Nominated	
2011	Bridget O'Connor	Tinker Tailor Soldier Spy	The novel by John le Carré	Nominated	Posthumous nomination. Shared with Peter Straughan.
2012	Lucy Alibar	Beasts of the Southern Wild	The play Juicy and Delicious by Alibar	Nominated	Shared with Benh Zeitlin.
2013	Julie Delpy	Before Midnight	Characters from the film Before Sunrise created by Richard Linklater & Kim Krizan	Nominated	Shared with Ethan Hawke and Linklater.
2015	Phyllis Nagy	Carol	The novel The Price of Salt by Patricia Highsmith	Nominated	
2015	Emma Donoghue	Room	The novel by Donoghue	Nominated	
2016	Allison Schroeder	Hidden Figures	The book Hidden Figures: The American Dream and the Untold Story of the Black Women Who Helped Win the Space Race by Margot Lee Shetterly	Nominated	Shared with Theodore Melfi.
2017	Dee Rees	Mudbound	The novel by Hillary Jordan	Nominated	First Black woman and woman of color to be nominated for Best Adapted Screenplay. Shared with Virgil Williams.
2018	Nicole Holofcener	Can You Ever Forgive Me?	The memoir by Lee Israel	Nominated	Shared with Jeff Whitty.
2019	Greta Gerwig	Little Women	The novel by Louisa May Alcott	Nominated	
2020	Erica Rivinoja; Jena Friedman; Nina Pedrad	Borat Subsequent Moviefilm	Based on the character Borat Sagdiyev from the television series Da Ali G Show by Sacha Baron Cohen	Nominated	Shared with Baron Cohen, Anthony Hines, Dan Swimer, Peter Baynham, Dan Mazer, and Lee Kern.
2020	Chloé Zhao	Nomadland	The book Nomadland: Surviving America in the Twenty-First Century by Jessica Bruder	Nominated	
2021	Sian Heder	CODA	Based on the screenplay La Famille Bélier by Victoria Bedos, Thomas Bidegain, Stanislas Carré de Malberg, and Éric Lartigau	Won	
2021	Maggie Gyllenhaal	The Lost Daughter	The novel by Elena Ferrante	Nominated	
2021	Jane Campion	The Power of the Dog	The novel by Thomas Savage	Nominated	
2022	Sarah Polley	Women Talking	The novel by Miriam Toews	Won	
2022	Lesley Paterson	All Quiet on the Western Front	The novel by Erich Maria Remarque	Nominated	Shared with Edward Berger and Ian Stokell.
2023	Greta Gerwig	Barbie	The characters created by Ruth Handler	Nominated	Shared with Noah Baumbach.
2024	Léa Mysius	Emilia Pérez	The opera libretto by Jacques Audiard & the novel Écoute by Boris Razon	Nominated	Shared with Audiard, Thomas Bidegain and Nicolas Livecchi.
2024	Joslyn Barnes	Nickel Boys	The novel The Nickel Boys by Colson Whitehead	Nominated	Shared with RaMell Ross.
2025	Chloé Zhao; Maggie O'Farrell	Hamnet	The novel by O'Farrell	Nominated	Zhao was the first woman of color with multiple nominations in this category.

== Best Writing (Original Screenplay) ==
Academy Award for Best Original Screenplay
Year	Name	Film	Status	Notes
1940	Joan Harrison	Foreign Correspondent	Nominated	First woman to be nominated for Best Original Screenplay. Among the inaugural nominees in this category. First woman to be nominated in the same year in two separate writing categories (for further information, see Best Adapted Screenplay). Shared with Charles Bennett.
1943	Lillian Hellman	The North Star	Nominated	
1944	Gladys Lehman	Two Girls and a Sailor	Nominated	Shared with Richard Connell.
1946	Muriel Box	The Seventh Veil	Won	Shared with Sydney Box.
1947	Ruth Gordon	A Double Life	Nominated	Shared with Garson Kanin.
1949	Helen Levitt; Janice Loeb	The Quiet One	Nominated	First documentary to be nominated in this category. Shared with Sidney Meyers.
1950	Ruth Gordon	Adam's Rib	Nominated	First woman with multiple nominations in this category. Shared with Garson Kanin.
1950	Virginia Kellogg	Caged	Nominated	Shared with Bernard C. Schoenfeld.
1952	Ruth Gordon	Pat and Mike	Nominated	Shared with Garson Kanin.
1953	Betty Comden	The Band Wagon	Nominated	Shared with Adolph Green.
1955	Sonya Levien	Interrupted Melody	Won	Shared with William Ludwig.
1955	Betty Comden	It's Always Fair Weather	Nominated	Shared with Adolph Green.
1955	Isobel Lennart	Love Me or Leave Me	Nominated	Shared with Daniel Fuchs.
1958	Fay Kanin	Teacher's Pet	Nominated	Shared with Michael Kanin.
1960	Marguerite Duras	Hiroshima, Mon Amour	Nominated	
1964	Ariane Mnouchkine	That Man from Rio	Nominated	Shared with Jean-Paul Rappeneau, Daniel Boulanger, and Philippe de Broca.
1965	Suso Cecchi d'Amico	Casanova 70	Nominated	Shared with Agenore Incrocci, Furio Scarpelli, Mario Monicelli, Tonino Guerra, and Giorgio Salvioni.
1970	Adrien Joyce	Five Easy Pieces	Nominated	Shared with Bob Rafelson.
1971	Penelope Gilliatt	Sunday Bloody Sunday	Nominated	
1972	Chris Clark; Suzanne de Passe	Lady Sings the Blues	Nominated	De Passe was the first African-American and black woman to be nominated for Best Original Screenplay. Shared with Terrence McCloy.
1973	Gloria Katz	American Graffiti	Nominated	Shared with George Lucas and Willard Huyck.
1974	Suzanne Schiffman	Day for Night	Nominated	Shared with François Truffaut and Jean-Louis Richard.
1976	Daniele Thompson	Cousin, Cousine	Nominated	Shared with Jean-Charles Tacchella.
1976	Lina Wertmüller	Seven Beauties	Nominated	
1978	Nancy Dowd	Coming Home	Won	Shared with Robert C. Jones and Waldo Salt.
1979	Valerie Curtin	...And Justice for All	Nominated	Shared with Barry Levinson.
1980	Nancy Meyers	Private Benjamin	Nominated	Shared with Charles Shyer and Harvey Miller.
1982	Melissa Mathison	E.T. the Extra-Terrestrial	Nominated	
1983	Barbara Benedek	The Big Chill	Nominated	Shared with Lawrence Kasdan.
1983	Nora Ephron; Alice Arlen	Silkwood	Nominated	
1984	Anna Thomas	El Norte	Nominated	Shared with Gregory Nava.
1985	Pamela Wallace	Witness	Won	Shared with Earl W. Wallace and William Kelley.
1985	Aida Bortnik	The Official Story	Nominated	First Latina to be nominated for Best Original Screenplay. Shared with Luis Puenzo.
1988	Anne Spielberg	Big	Nominated	Shared with Gary Ross.
1988	Naomi Foner	Running on Empty	Nominated	
1989	Nora Ephron	When Harry Met Sally...	Nominated	
1991	Callie Khouri	Thelma & Louise	Won	
1991	Meg Kasdan	Grand Canyon	Nominated	Shared with Lawrence Kasdan.
1993	Jane Campion	The Piano	Won	
1993	Nora Ephron	Sleepless in Seattle	Nominated	Shared with Jeff Arch and David S. Ward.
1994	Fran Walsh	Heavenly Creatures	Nominated	Shared with Peter Jackson.
2000	Susannah Grant	Erin Brockovich	Nominated	
2002	Nia Vardalos	My Big Fat Greek Wedding	Nominated	
2003	Sofia Coppola	Lost in Translation	Won	
2003	Kirsten Sheridan; Naomi Sheridan	In America	Nominated	Shared with Jim Sheridan.
2006	Iris Yamashita	Letters from Iwo Jima	Nominated	Shared with Paul Haggis.
2007	Diablo Cody	Juno	Won	
2007	Nancy Oliver	Lars and the Real Girl	Nominated	
2007	Tamara Jenkins	The Savages	Nominated	
2008	Courtney Hunt	Frozen River	Nominated	
2010	Lisa Cholodenko	The Kids Are All Right	Nominated	Shared with Stuart Blumberg.
2011	Annie Mumolo; Kristen Wiig	Bridesmaids	Nominated	
2013	Melisa Wallack	Dallas Buyers Club	Nominated	Shared with Craig Borten.
2015	Meg LeFauve	Inside Out	Nominated	Shared with Pete Docter, Josh Cooley, and Ronnie del Carmen.
2015	Andrea Berloff	Straight Outta Compton	Nominated	Shared with Jonathan Herman, S. Leigh Savidge, and Alan Wenkus.
2017	Emily V. Gordon	The Big Sick	Nominated	Shared with Kumail Nanjiani.
2017	Greta Gerwig	Lady Bird	Nominated	
2017	Vanessa Taylor	The Shape of Water	Nominated	Shared with Guillermo del Toro.
2018	Deborah Davis	The Favourite	Nominated	Shared with Tony McNamara.
2019	Krysty Wilson-Cairns	1917	Nominated	Shared with Sam Mendes.
2020	Emerald Fennell	Promising Young Woman	Won	
2023	Justine Triet	Anatomy of a Fall	Won	Shared with Arthur Harari.
2023	Samy Burch	May December	Nominated	Shared with Alex Mechanik.
2023	Celine Song	Past Lives	Nominated	
2024	Mona Fastvold	The Brutalist	Nominated	Shared with Brady Corbet.
2024	Coralie Fargeat	The Substance	Nominated	

== Best Writing (Original Story) ==
Academy Award for Best Story
Year	Name	Film	Status	Notes
1931-32	Frances Marion	The Champ	Won	Among the first women to be nominated and the first woman to win for Best Original Story. First person with multiple wins in writing categories (for further information, see Best Adapted Screenplay)
1931-32	Adela Rogers St. Johns; Jane Murfin	What Price Hollywood?	Nominated	Among the first women to be nominated for Best Original Story.
1932-33	Frances Marion	The Prizefighter and the Lady	Nominated	First woman with multiple nominations in this category.
1936	Adele Comandini	Three Smart Girls	Nominated	
1938	Eleanore Griffin	Boys Town	Won	Shared with Dore Schary.
1938	Marcella Burke	Mad About Music	Nominated	Shared with Frederick Kohner.
1939	Mildred Cram	Love Affair	Nominated	Shared with Leo McCarey.
1940	Bella Spewack	My Favorite Wife	Nominated	Shared with Leo McCarey and Samuel Spewack.
1946	Clemence Dane	Vacation from Marriage	Won	
1947	Dorothy Parker	Smash-Up, the Story of a Woman	Nominated	Shared with Frank Cavett.
1948	Frances H. Flaherty	Louisiana Story	Nominated	Shared with Robert J. Flaherty.
1949	Clare Boothe Luce	Come to the Stable	Nominated	
1949	Virginia Kellogg	White Heat	Nominated	
1950	Edna Anhalt	Panic in the Streets	Won	Shared with Edward Anhalt.
1952	Edna Anhalt	The Sniper	Nominated	Shared with Edward Anhalt.
1953	Ruth Orkin	Little Fugitive	Nominated	Shared with Ray Ashley and Morris Engel.

== Special awards ==
Academy Honorary Award
Year	Name	Notes
1954	Greta Garbo	"for her unforgettable screen performances."
1968	Onna White	"for her outstanding choreography achievement for Oliver!"
1970	Lillian Gish	"for superlative artistry and for distinguished contribution to the progress of motion pictures."
1975	Mary Pickford	"in recognition of her unique contributions to the film industry and the development of film as an artistic medium."
1977	Margaret Booth	"for her exceptional contribution to the art of film editing in the motion picture industry."
1981	Barbara Stanwyck	"for superlative creativity and unique contribution to the art of screen acting."
1990 (Note: The first year to have multiple women honored with the Academy Honorary Award.)	Sophia Loren	"one of the genuine treasures of world cinema who, in a career rich with memorable performances, has added permanent luster to our art form."
1990	Myrna Loy	"in recognition of her extraordinary qualities both on screen and off, with appreciation for a lifetime's worth of indelible performances."
1993	Deborah Kerr	"in appreciation for a full career's worth of elegant and beautifully crafted performances."
2009	Lauren Bacall	"in recognition of her central place in the Golden Age of motion pictures."
2013	Angela Lansbury	"an entertainment icon who has created some of cinema's most memorable characters, inspiring generations of actors."
2014	Maureen O'Hara	"One of Hollywood's brightest stars, whose inspiring performances glowed with passion, warmth and strength."
2015	Gena Rowlands	"an original talent whose devotion to her craft has earned her worldwide recognition as an independent film icon"
2016	Anne V. Coates	"In her more than 60 years as a film editor, she has worked side by side with many leading directors on an impressive range of films"
2017	Agnès Varda	"her compassion and curiosity inform a uniquely personal cinema"
2018	Cicely Tyson	"whose unforgettable performances and personal integrity have inspired generations of filmmakers, actors and audiences"
2019	Lina Wertmüller	"for her provocative disruption of political and social norms delivered with bravery through her weapon of choice: the camera lens."
2021	Elaine May	"for her bold, uncompromising approach to filmmaking, as a writer, director and actress"
2021	Liv Ullmann	"Ullman's bravery and emotional transparency has gifted audiences with deeply affecting screen portrayals"
2022	Euzhan Palcy	"a masterful filmmaker who broke ground for Black women directors and inspired storytellers of all kinds across the globe"
2022	Diane Warren	"for her genius, generosity and passionate commitment to the power of song in film"
2023	Angela Bassett	"Across her decades-long career, Angela Bassett has continued to deliver transcendent performances that set new standards in acting"
2023	Carol Littleton	"Littleton's career in film editing serves as a model for those who come after her"
2024	Juliet Taylor	"Juliet Taylor has cast iconic and beloved films and paved a new path for the field."
2025	Debbie Allen	"a trailblazing choreographer and actor, whose work has captivated generations and crossed genres"

Jean Hersholt Humanitarian Award
Year	Name	Notes
1968	Martha Raye	
1972	Rosalind Russell	
1992 (Note: The first year to have multiple individuals honored with the Jean Hersholt Humanitarian Award.)	Audrey Hepburn	The award, which was voted to confer eight days prior to Hepburn's death, was presented posthumously. Her son, Sean, accepted the award at the ceremony.
1992	Elizabeth Taylor	
2006	Sherry Lansing	
2011	Oprah Winfrey	
2013	Angelina Jolie	
2015	Debbie Reynolds	
2019	Geena Davis	
2023	Michelle Satter	
2025	Dolly Parton	

Irving G. Thalberg Memorial Award
Year	Name	Notes
2018	Kathleen Kennedy	Shared with Frank Marshall.
2024	Barbara Broccoli	Shared with Michael G. Wilson.

Academy Juvenile Award (Note: The Juvenile Oscar was intermittently awarded between 1934 and 1960, recognizing performers under the age of eighteen. It was not gender-specific.)
Year	Name	Notes
1934	Shirley Temple	"in grateful recognition of her outstanding contribution to screen entertainment during the year 1934."
1938 (Note: The first year to have multiple individuals honored with the Academy Juvenile Award.)	Deanna Durbin	"for [their] significant contribution in bringing to the screen the spirit and personification of youth, and as juvenile players setting a high standard of ability and achievement." Shared with Mickey Rooney.
1939	Judy Garland	"for her outstanding performance as a screen juvenile during the past year."
1944	Margaret O'Brien	"outstanding child actress of 1944."
1945	Peggy Ann Garner	"outstanding child actress of 1945."
1960	Hayley Mills	"for Pollyanna, the most outstanding juvenile performance during 1960."
