= Rosamund Felsen Gallery =

Art gallery in Los Angeles, California

Coordinates: 34.022351°N 118.230495°W

The Rosamund Felsen Gallery was one of the longest-running art galleries in Los Angeles, California. Since its establishment in 1978, it had actively participated in and influenced the broader American art community. The gallery had operated four locations in Southern California since its inception: first on La Cienega Boulevard in Los Angeles, then on Santa Monica Boulevard in West Hollywood, later at Bergamot Station in Santa Monica, and finally in the Downtown Los Angeles Arts District. The gallery closed in 2016 after 38 years in operation.

== History ==
=== 1970s ===
Rosamund Felsen established her influential Los Angeles gallery in 1978 on La Cienega Boulevard. Representing under-recognized artists who were instrumental in the development of Southern California's emerging contemporary art scene. By so doing, Felsen challenged the prevailing New York-centric views of art and broadened its scope. Drawing on her experience co-founding Gemini G.E.L. and working at the Pasadena Art Museum, Felsen established a premier venue for California contemporary art. In the first year, Rosamund Felsen Gallery presented exhibitions featuring the work of Guy Dill, Richard Jackson, Keith Sonnier, Peter Lodato, Alexis Smith, Maria Nordman, and William Wegman. The following year, the gallery expanded its program to include Karen Carson and Grant Mudford, and Chris Burden’s Big Wheel was exhibited for the first time—now part of the Museum of Contemporary Art, Los Angeles' Permanent Collection. The La Cienega space had been formerly occupied by gallerist, Riko Mizuno and later by Gagosian Gallery.

=== 1980s ===
In 1980, Richard Jackson exhibited his first installation of stacked paintings, Big Ideas, at Rosamund Felsen Gallery. Later versions of stacked paintings, would be exhibited at his 2013 retrospective at Orange County Museum of Art.

In 1981, the four out of sixteen artists who were in Los Angeles County Museum (LACMA)’s exhibition, The Museum as Site – Sixteen Projects, an exhibition devoted to the significance of site-specific art in the 1970s, included Richard Jackson, Chris Burden and the only women artists in the exhibition, Karen Carson and Alexis Smith, were represented by Rosamund Felsen Gallery. On New Year’s Eve, 1981, a black tie opening was held at the gallery for the exhibition of Robert Rauschenberg’s photographic series, In + Out City Limits: Los Angeles, one of several series the artist has made of specific cities.

That same year, in 1981, Jeffrey Vallance began showing in the gallery. Two years later, in 1983, Mike Kelley and Lari Pittman had their first exhibitions with the gallery.

In, 1983, Mike Kelly showed "one of his breakthrough works", Monkey Island, "a performance/installation" which had been shown at Metro Pictures Gallery in New York the year prior. Later, in 1987, Mike Kelly had another notable exhibition, where he "splayed blankets across" Rosamund Felsen Gallery's "floor and arranged tattered animals around them in formal groupings, like they were attending a picnic without people." The largest piece in this show, More Love Hours Than Can Ever Be Repaid, composed of animals and afghans and stretched 10 feet wide" hung next to The Wages of Sin, "a pedestal table dripping with candles in rainbow hues, as though audiences were standing before a holy shrine at mass, a nod to his Catholic upbringing." Both those pieces were in included in the Whitney Biennial that year and they were purchased by the Whitney Museum of American Art.

The 1980s and the 1990s also saw the additions of prominent women artists such Renée Petropoulos, Erika Rothenberg, Meg Cranston, Ann Preston, Joan Jonas, Marnie Weber, and Laura Owens, as well as male artists Tim Ebner and Jason Rhoades.

=== 1990s ===
In 1990, after 12 years at the La Cienega site, Rosamund Felsen Gallery moved to West Hollywood on Santa Monica Boulevard to a space that had previously been the studio of entertainment photographer, Tom Kelley, and where Jason Rhoades had his first gallery exhibition, Swedish Erotica and Fiero Parts.

In January 1993, Tom Knechtel exhibits his paintings and pastel drawings that combined playful fantasy, classical traditions, and explicit yet tender eroticism.

In 1992, for Helter Skelter: L.A. Art in the 1990s, the historically significant exhibition curated by Paul Schimmel at the Museum of Contemporary Art, Los Angeles, four of the seventeen artist chosen to be in the show were Rosamund Felsen Gallery artists Richard Jackson, Mike Kelley, Paul McCarthy, and Lari Pittman.

In 1994, Rosamund Felsen Gallery moved to Bergamot Station in Santa Monica, and the important New York video artists Judith Barry and Joan Jonas were added to its list of exhibiting artists, as well as M. A. Peers, Mindy Alper, Jacci Den Hartog, Andrew Falkowski, Steven Hull, Steve Hurd, Nancy Jackson, Gegam Kacherian, Mary Kelly, Jean Lowe, Kim MacConnel, Patrick Nickell and Pauline Stella Sanchez.

=== 2010s ===
In 2011, Rosamund Felsen Gallery saw the addition of Charles Arnoldi to its roster of exhibiting artists, and for the gallery's November–December show, Charles Arnoldi would show influential artworks from the 1970s as part of the Getty Center's Pacific Standard Time: Art in L.A. art program throughout Los Angeles.

In 2012, for the gallery's end of the year show, Mary Kelly had a gallery exhibition which framed "an epoch — the period from World War II through the Cold War — in a few shrewd conceptual strokes, employing as she often has in her work, the voice of the individual bystander as a mirror to the broader forces of history." From this exhibition, the piece Mimus, Act I (Posner) - which was "made of sheets of compressed lint from domestic dryers affixed to variously colored cardboard" using language which had been "sourced from the court transcripts of the red-baiting House Committee on Un-American Activities and centers on the depositions of activists in the 1950s movement Women Strike for Peace." - was acquired by the Hammer Museum and would later be shown in the museum exhibition, Take It or Leave It: Institution, Image, Ideology, two years later.

In 2013, Rosamund Felsen Gallery was featured in Los Angeles Magazine as one of the top galleries in Los Angeles.

In 2014, two of the gallery artists, Mary Kelly and Judith Barry, had works that were included in the exhibition, Take It or Leave It: Institution, Image, Ideology at the Hammer Museum in Los Angeles. Take It or Leave It would be "the first large-scale exhibition to focus on the intersection of two vitally important genres of contemporary art: appropriation (taking and recasting existing images, forms, and styles from mass-media and fine art sources) and institutional critique (scrutinizing and confronting the structures and practices of our social, cultural, and political institutions)."

In 2015, Tanya Haden was added to the roster of exhibiting artists and had her first one-artist exhibition while gallery artist Joan Jonas was selected to represent the United States in at Venice Biennale 56th International Art Exhibition. In April 2015, the gallery moved from its Bergamot Station location to a new space in the Arts District, Los Angeles in Downtown Los Angeles. The inaugural exhibition, which ran from April 18 through May 16, 2015, consisted of paintings by Pattern and Decoration pioneer Kim MacConnel. In April 2016, the gallerist Rosamund Felsen received a four-page profile in the culture section of the Los Angeles Times by writer Caroline A. Miranda, documenting Rosamund Felsen Gallery's move along with the cultural migration eastward in Los Angeles & the transitioning cultural landscape of Los Angeles during this time.

In June 2016, Rosamund Felsen Gallery announced that it would be closing its Downtown Los Angeles location with the show Celebration, slating it as a “tribute not only to all the extraordinary artists who have filled both the gallery space and the gallery’s identity over the years, but also as a marking point for the current gallery artists' ongoing careers.” Celebration would include pieces by each of the Rosamund Felsen Gallery artists at the time. Rosamund Felsen Gallery continues to represent its artist and maintains a presence online.

In April 2017, the film Heaven Is a Traffic Jam on the 405 by director Frank Stiefel, which profiled & documented the story and works of gallery artist Mindy Alper, won the 20th Anniversary Full Frame Jury Award For Best Short and the following year won the Oscar for Best Documentary Short Subject at the 90th Academy Awards.

== Represented artists ==
- Mindy Alper
- Judith Barry
- Morton Bartlett
- Jenn Berger
- Jacci Den Hartog
- Andrew Falkowski
- Tanya Haden
- Kathleen Henderson
- Nancy Jackson
- Joan Jonas
- Karen Liebowitz
- Jean Lowe
- Kim MacConnel
- John Mills
- Grant Mudford
- Patrick Nickell
- Marc Pally
- M. A. Peers
- Jon Peterson
- Renée Petropoulos
- Ann Preston
- Marcia Roberts
- C. K. Wilde
