= 90th Academy Awards =

- Official poster
- Date: March 4, 2018
- Site: Dolby Theatre; Hollywood, Los Angeles, California, U.S.
- Hosted by: Jimmy Kimmel
- Preshow hosts: Sara Haines; Dave Karger; Wendi McLendon-Covey; Michael Strahan; Krista Smith
- Produced by: Michael De Luca; Jennifer Todd
- Directed by: Glenn Weiss

Highlights
- Best Picture: The Shape of Water
- Most awards: The Shape of Water (4)
- Most nominations: The Shape of Water (13)

TV in the United States
- Network: ABC
- Duration: 3 hours, 53 minutes
- Ratings: 26.54 million 18.9% (Nielsen ratings)

The 90th Academy Awards ceremony, presented by the Academy of Motion Picture Arts and Sciences (AMPAS), honored the best films of 2017, and took place at the Dolby Theatre in Hollywood, Los Angeles, California. The ceremony was held on March 4, 2018, rather than its usual late-February date to avoid conflicting with the 2018 Winter Olympics. During the ceremony, AMPAS presented Academy Awards (commonly referred to as Oscars) in 24 categories. The ceremony, which was televised in the United States by ABC, was produced by Michael De Luca and Jennifer Todd and directed by Glenn Weiss. Comedian Jimmy Kimmel hosted for the second consecutive year.

In related events, the Academy held its 9th Annual Governors Awards ceremony at the Grand Ballroom of the Hollywood and Highland Center on November 11, 2017. On February 10, 2018, in a ceremony at the Beverly Wilshire Hotel in Beverly Hills, California, the Academy Scientific and Technical Awards were presented by host Patrick Stewart.

The Shape of Water won four awards, including Best Picture. Other winners included Dunkirk with three awards, Blade Runner 2049, Coco, Darkest Hour, and Three Billboards Outside Ebbing, Missouri with two awards, and Call Me by Your Name, Dear Basketball, A Fantastic Woman, Get Out, Heaven Is a Traffic Jam on the 405, I, Tonya, Icarus, Phantom Thread, and The Silent Child with one. The telecast garnered 26.54 million viewers in the United States.

== Winners and nominees ==
The nominees for the 90th Academy Awards were announced on January 23, 2018, at 5:22 a.m. PST (13:22 UTC), at the Samuel Goldwyn Theater in Beverly Hills, California, by actors Tiffany Haddish and Andy Serkis. The Shape of Water led all nominees with thirteen nominations; Dunkirk came in second with eight.

The winners were announced during the awards ceremony on March 4, 2018. Greta Gerwig became the fifth woman to be nominated for Best Director. At age 22, Best Actor nominee Timothée Chalamet was the third-youngest person nominated in that category and the youngest since 19-year-old Mickey Rooney for his role in Babes in Arms in 1939. At age 88, Best Supporting Actor nominee Christopher Plummer became the oldest ever performer nominated for a competitive Oscar. By virtue of her nominations for Best Supporting Actress and Best Original Song for Mudbound, Mary J. Blige was the first person to be nominated for both acting and songwriting in the same year. At age 89, Best Adapted Screenplay winner James Ivory became the oldest winner of a competitive Oscar. Jordan Peele was the first African American winner for Best Original Screenplay. Rachel Morrison became the first woman nominated for Best Cinematography.

=== Awards ===
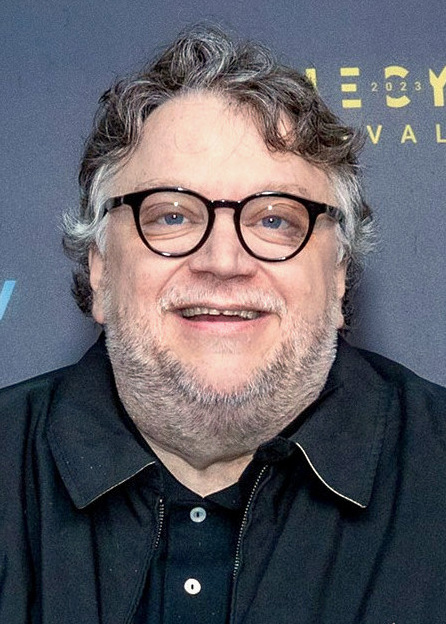
Guillermo del Toro, Best Picture co-winner and Best Director winner

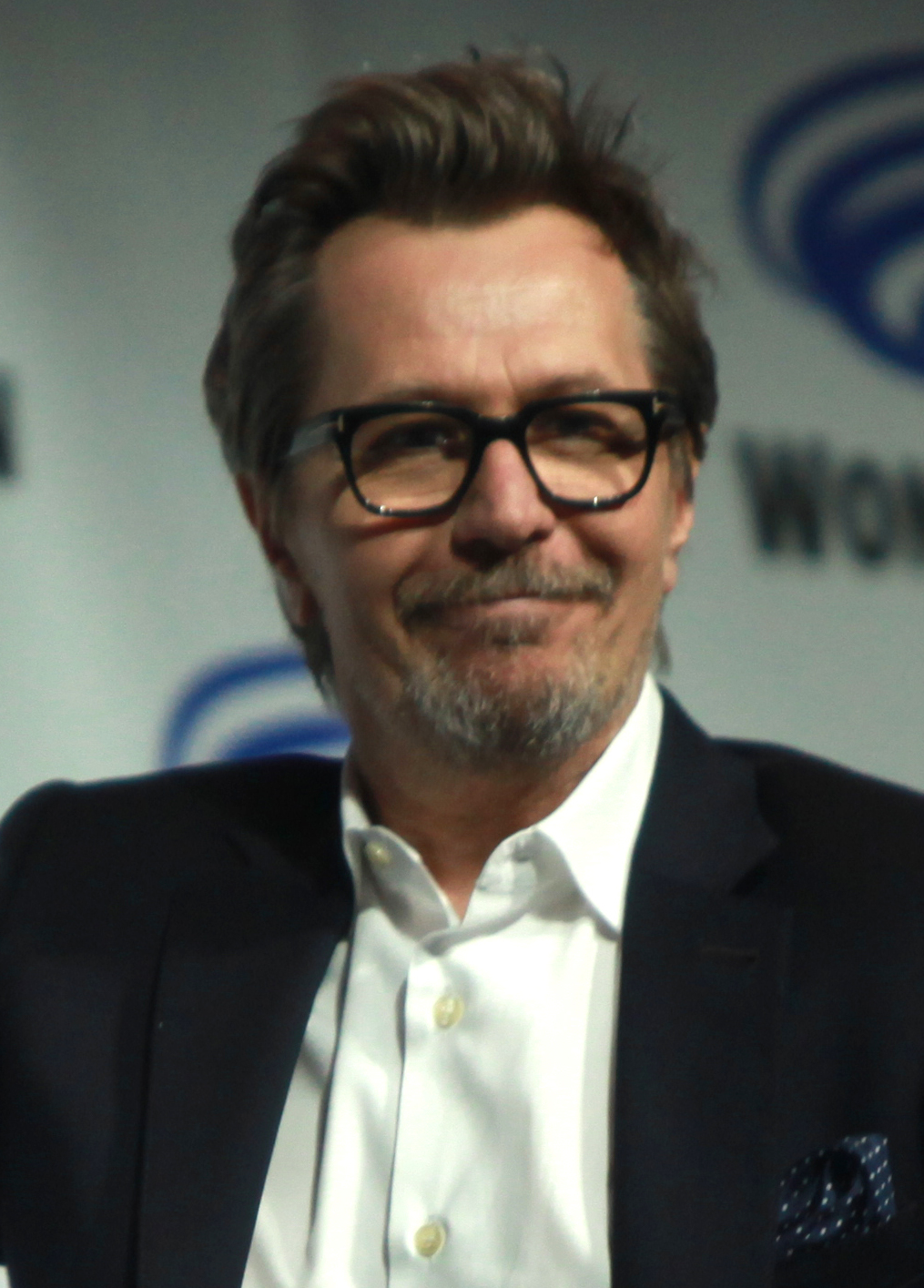
Gary Oldman, Best Actor winner

Frances McDormand, Best Actress winner

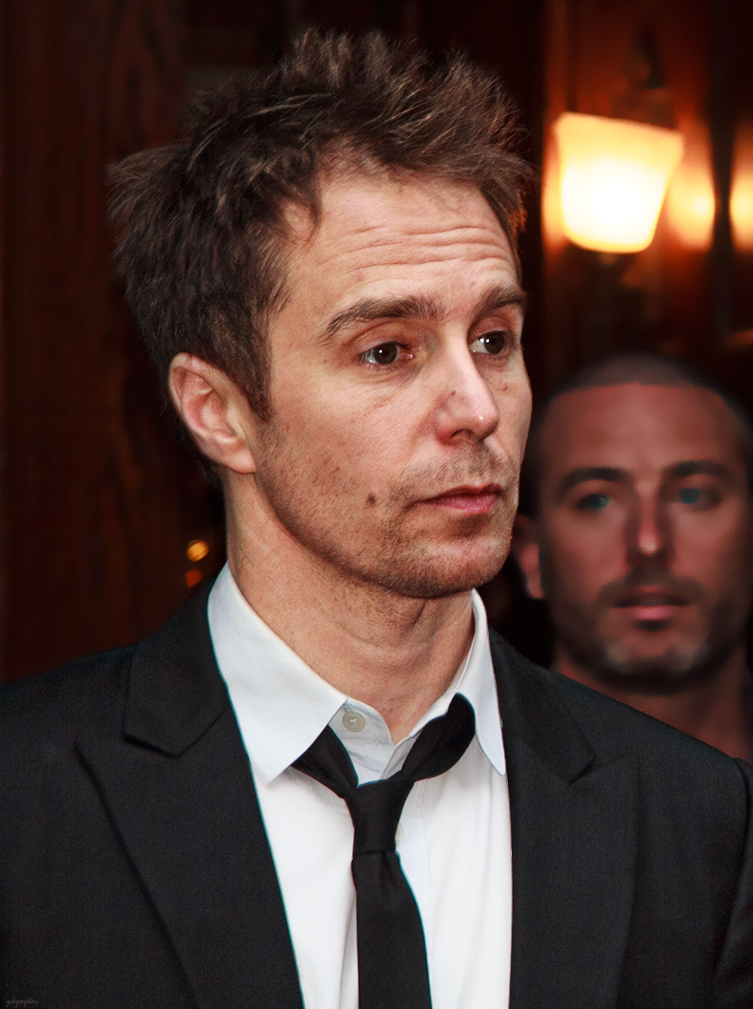
Sam Rockwell, Best Supporting Actor winner

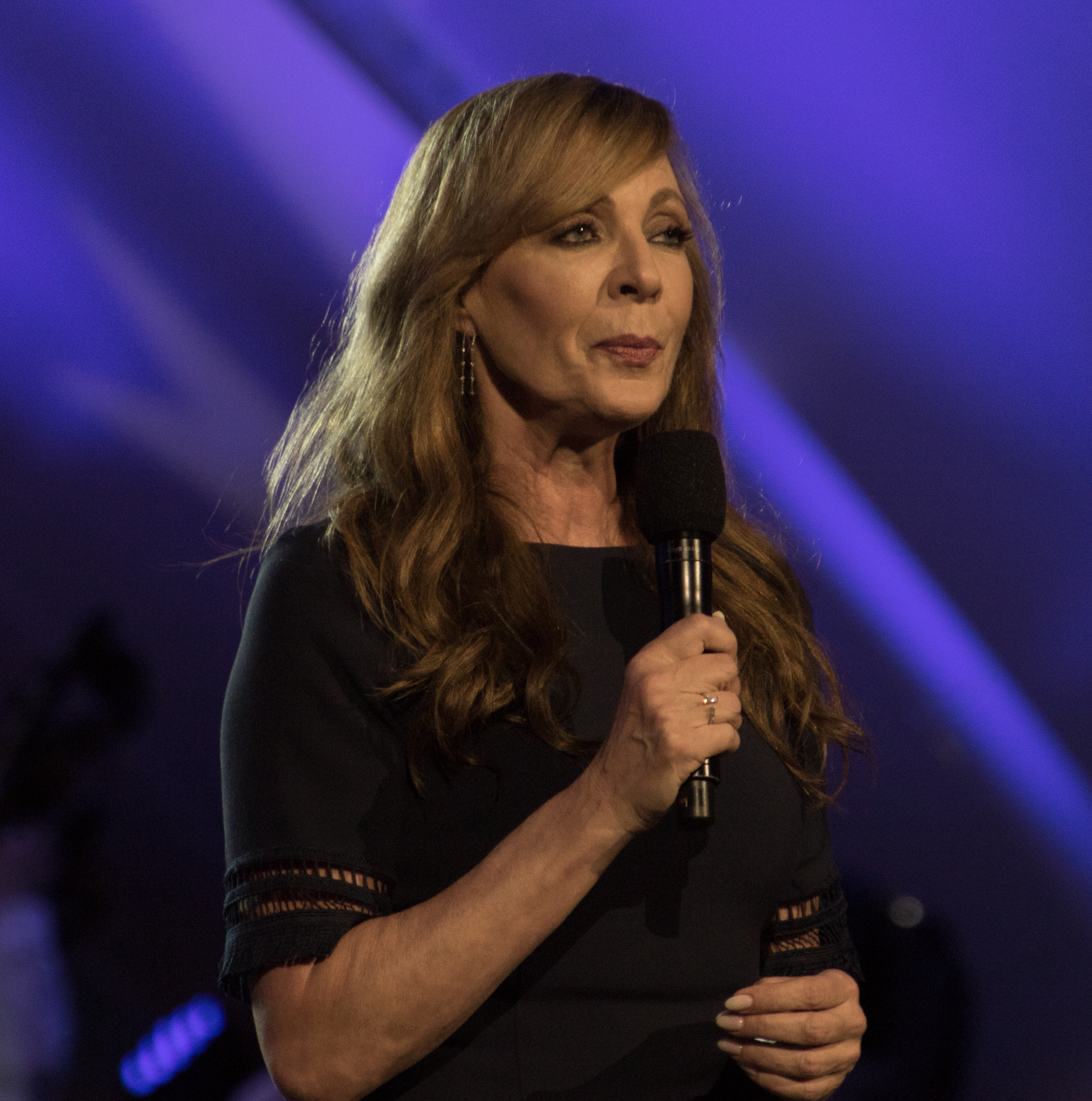
Allison Janney, Best Supporting Actress winner

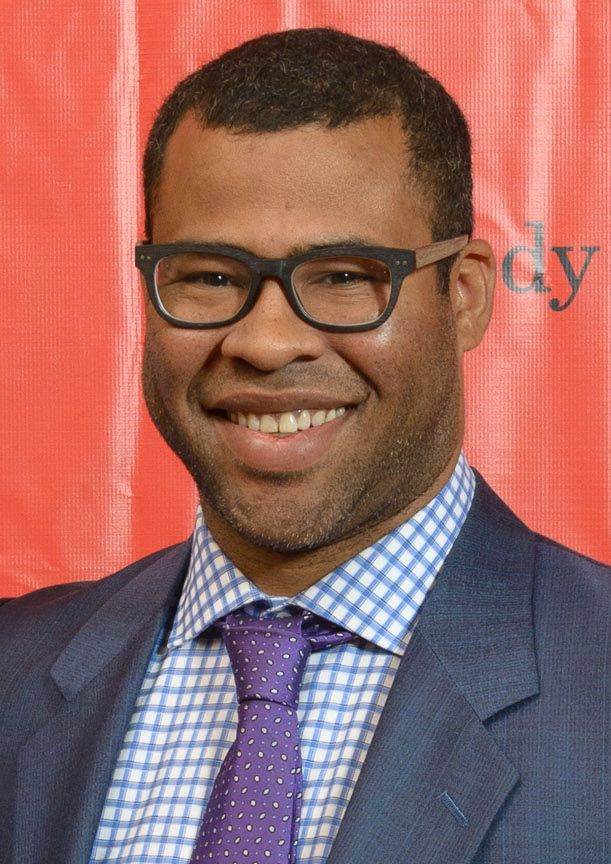
Jordan Peele, Best Original Screenplay winner

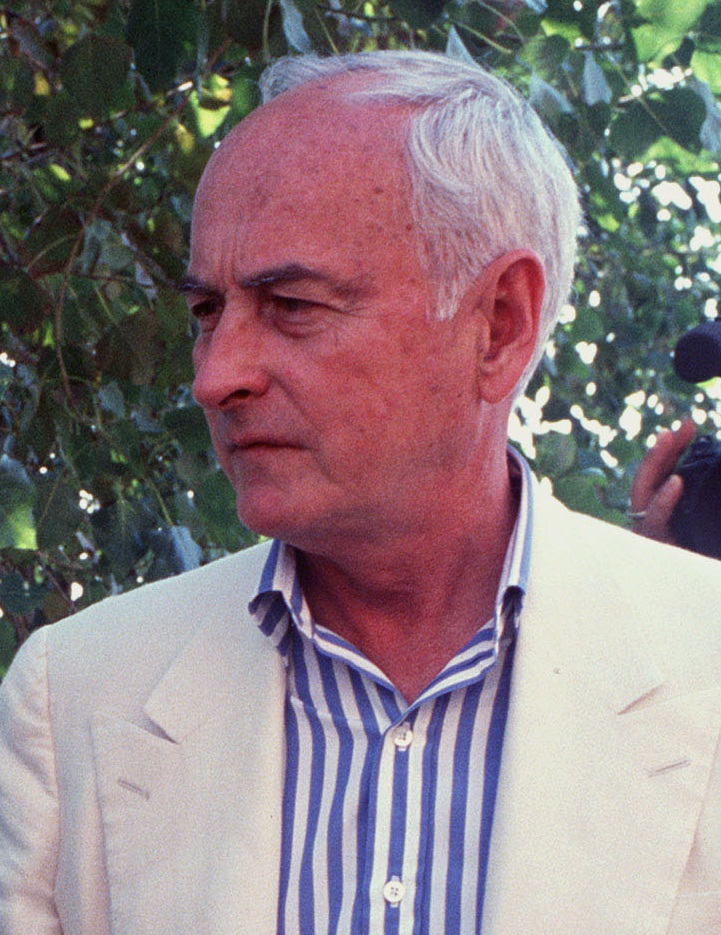
James Ivory, Best Adapted Screenplay winner

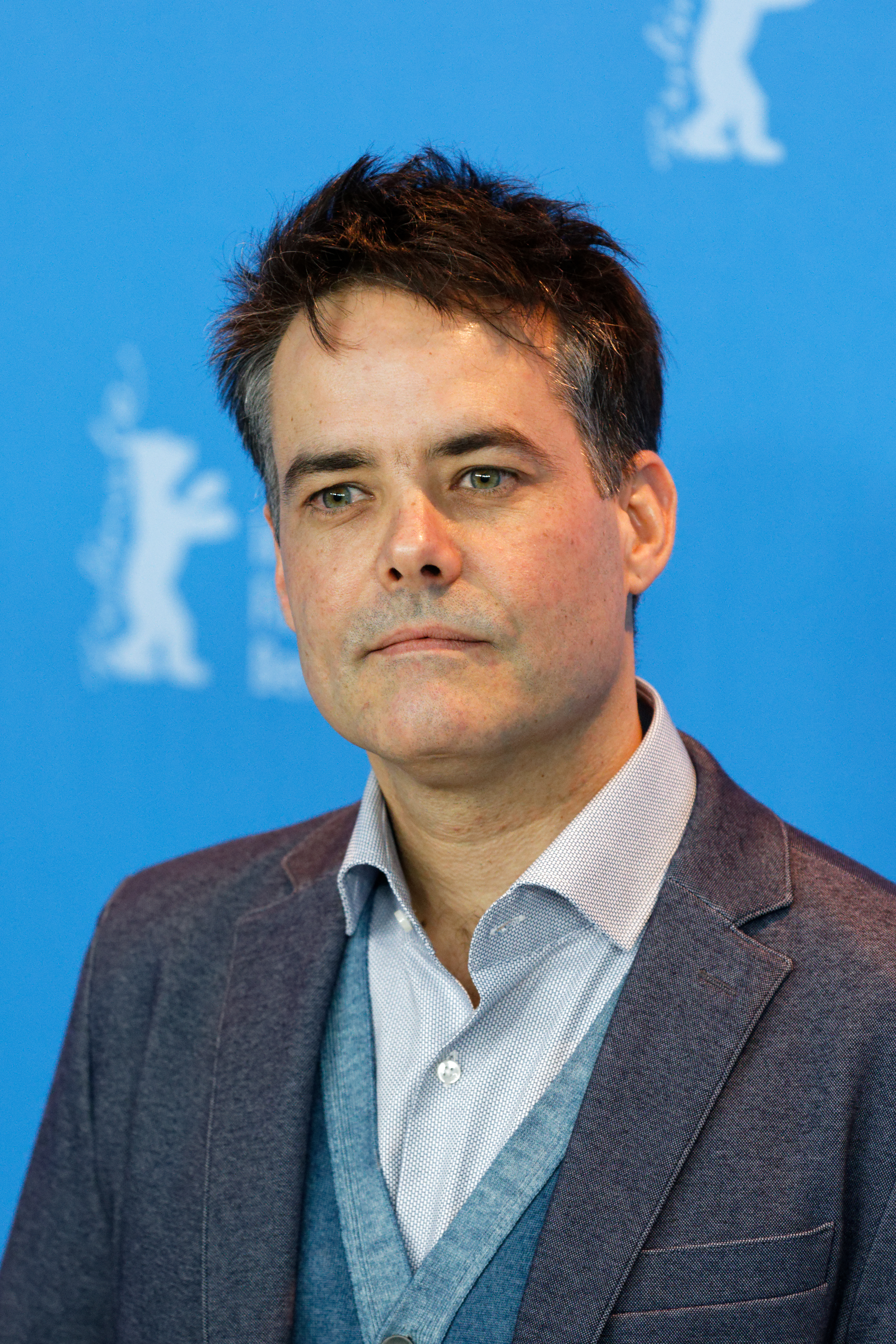
Sebastián Lelio, Best Foreign Language Film winner

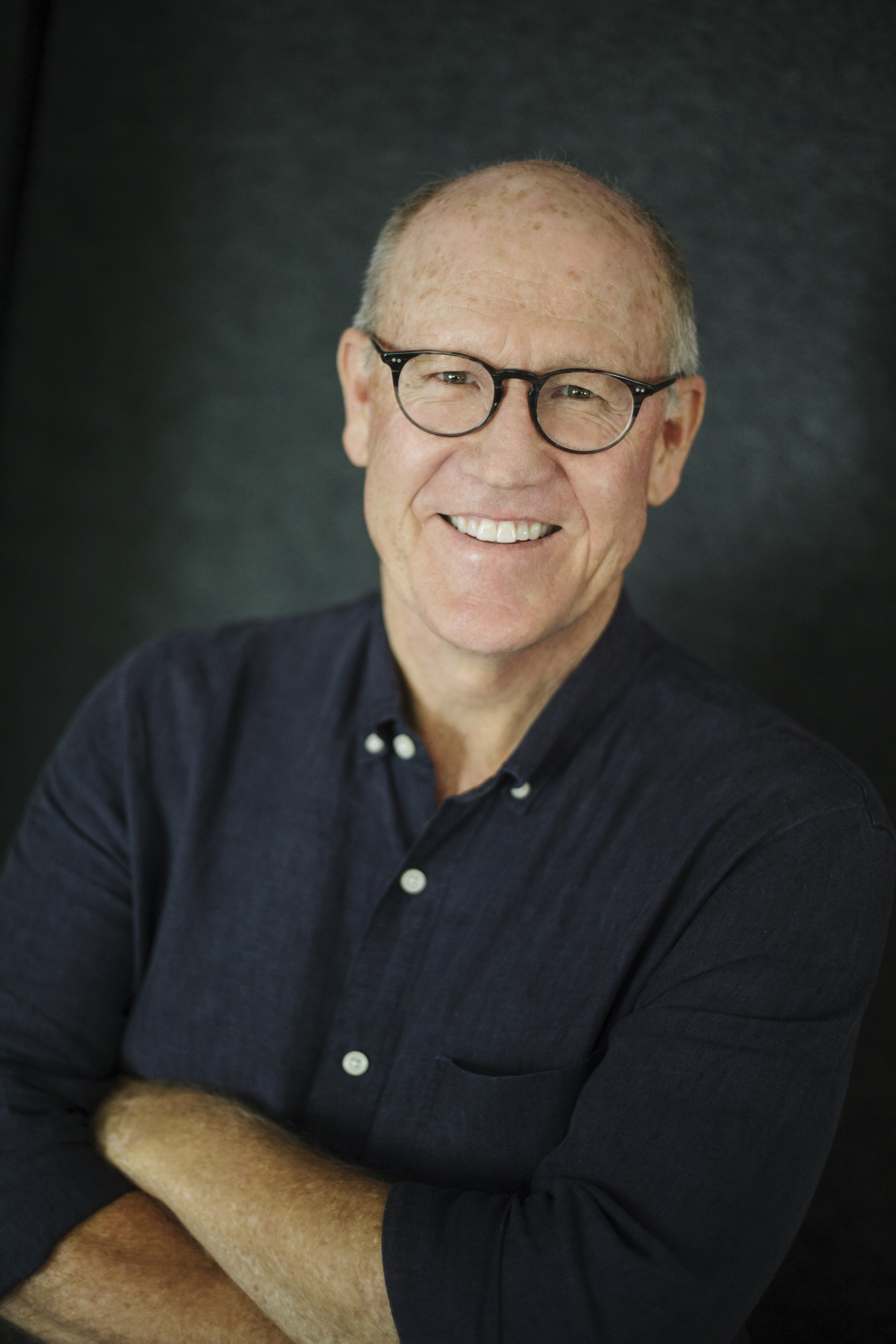
Glen Keane, Best Animated Short Film co-winner

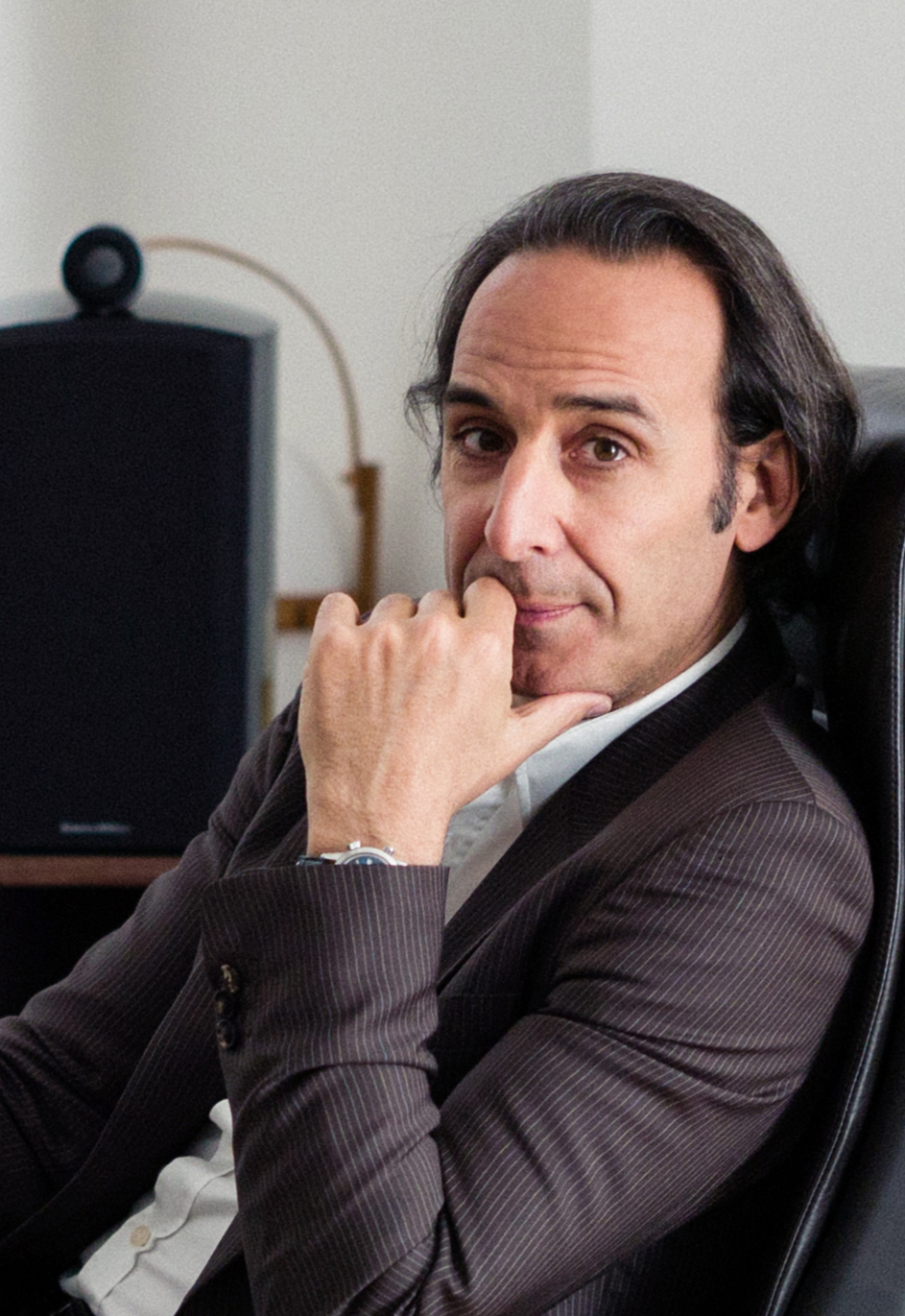
Alexandre Desplat, Best Original Score winner

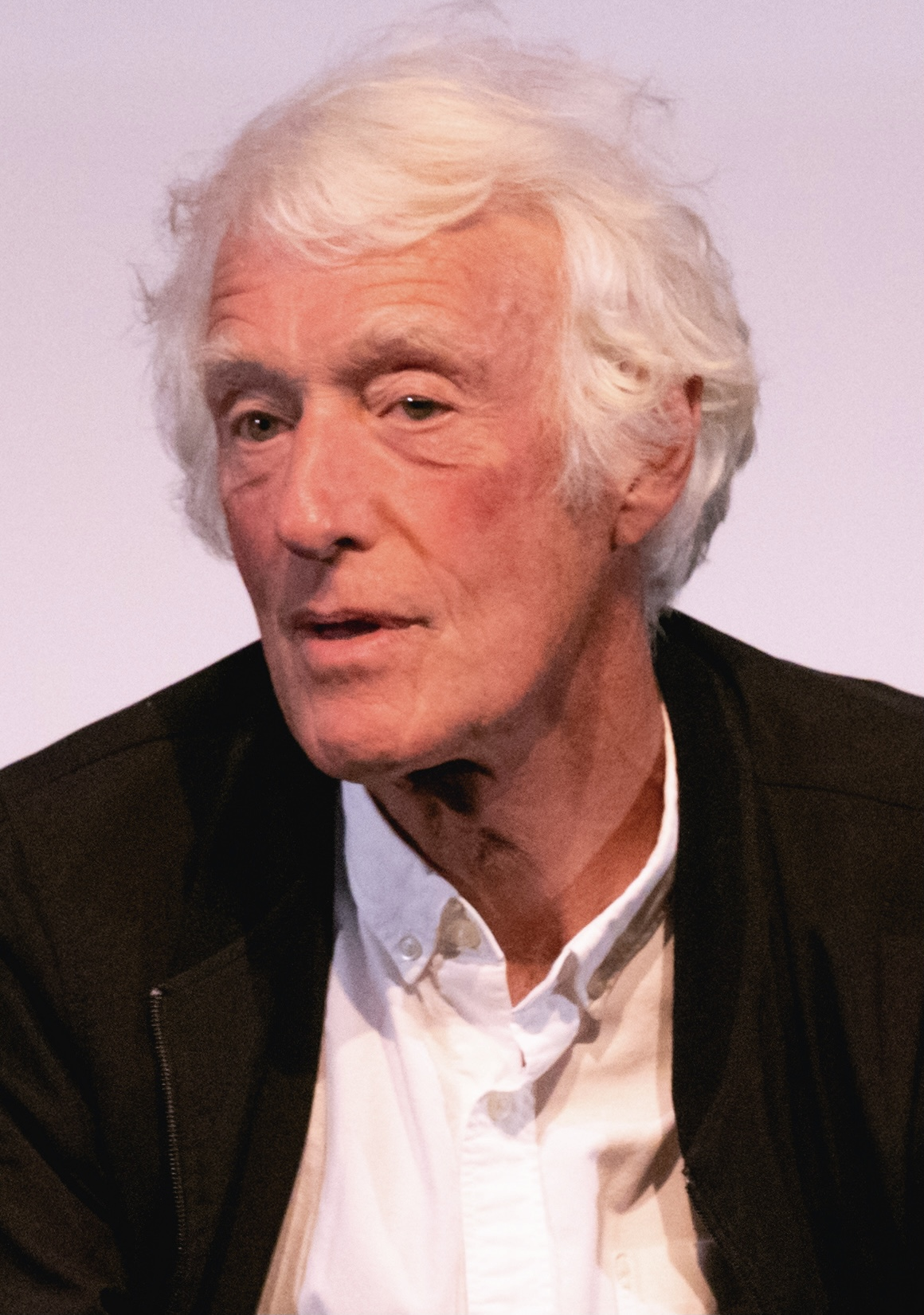
Roger Deakins, Best Cinematography winner

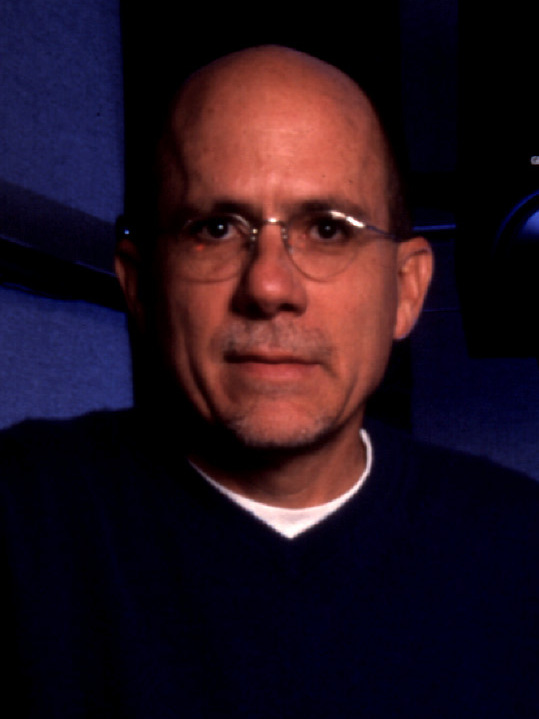
Richard King, Best Sound Editing co-winner

Winners are listed first, highlighted in boldface, and indicated with a double dagger (‡).

**Best Picture**: **The Shape of Water – Guillermo del Toro and J. Miles Dale**‡; Call Me by Your Name – Peter Spears, Luca Guadagnino, Émilie Georges and Marco Morabito; Darkest Hour – Tim Bevan, Eric Fellner, Lisa Bruce, Anthony McCarten and Douglas Urbanski; Dunkirk – Emma Thomas and Christopher Nolan; Get Out – Sean McKittrick, Jason Blum, Edward H. Hamm Jr. and Jordan Peele; Lady Bird – Scott Rudin, Eli Bush and Evelyn O'Neill; Phantom Thread – JoAnne Sellar, Paul Thomas Anderson, Megan Ellison and Daniel Lupi; The Post – Amy Pascal, Steven Spielberg and Kristie Macosko Krieger; Three Billboards Outside Ebbing, Missouri – Graham Broadbent, Pete Czernin and Martin McDonagh	**Best Directing**: **Guillermo del Toro – The Shape of Water**‡; Christopher Nolan – Dunkirk; Jordan Peele – Get Out; Greta Gerwig – Lady Bird; Paul Thomas Anderson – Phantom Thread
**Best Actor in a Leading Role**: **Gary Oldman – Darkest Hour as Winston Churchill**‡; Timothée Chalamet – Call Me by Your Name as Elio Perlman; Daniel Day-Lewis – Phantom Thread as Reynolds Woodcock; Daniel Kaluuya – Get Out as Chris Washington; Denzel Washington – Roman J. Israel, Esq. as Roman J. Israel	**Best Actress in a Leading Role**: **Frances McDormand – Three Billboards Outside Ebbing, Missouri as Mildred Hayes**‡; Sally Hawkins – The Shape of Water as Elisa Esposito; Margot Robbie – I, Tonya as Tonya Harding; Saoirse Ronan – Lady Bird as Christine "Lady Bird" McPherson; Meryl Streep – The Post as Katharine Graham
**Best Actor in a Supporting Role**: **Sam Rockwell – Three Billboards Outside Ebbing, Missouri as Officer Jason Dixon**‡; Willem Dafoe – The Florida Project as Bobby Hicks; Woody Harrelson – Three Billboards Outside Ebbing, Missouri as Chief William "Bill" Willoughby; Richard Jenkins – The Shape of Water as Giles; Christopher Plummer – All the Money in the World as J. Paul Getty	**Best Actress in a Supporting Role**: **Allison Janney – I, Tonya as LaVona Golden**‡; Mary J. Blige – Mudbound as Florence Jackson; Lesley Manville – Phantom Thread as Cyril Woodcock; Laurie Metcalf – Lady Bird as Marion McPherson; Octavia Spencer – The Shape of Water as Zelda Delilah Fuller
**Best Writing (Original Screenplay)**: **Get Out – Jordan Peele**‡; The Big Sick – Emily V. Gordon and Kumail Nanjiani; Lady Bird – Greta Gerwig; The Shape of Water – Guillermo del Toro and Vanessa Taylor; Story by Guillermo del Toro; Three Billboards Outside Ebbing, Missouri – Martin McDonagh	**Best Writing (Adapted Screenplay)**: **Call Me by Your Name – James Ivory; based on the novel by André Aciman**‡; The Disaster Artist – Scott Neustadter and Michael H. Weber; based on the book The Disaster Artist: My Life Inside The Room, the Greatest Bad Movie Ever Made by Greg Sestero and Tom Bissell; Logan – Scott Frank, James Mangold and Michael Green; Story by James Mangold; based on the character Wolverine created by Len Wein and John Romita Sr.; Molly's Game – Aaron Sorkin; based on the book by Molly Bloom; Mudbound – Virgil Williams and Dee Rees; based on the novel by Hillary Jordan
**Best Animated Feature Film**: **Coco – Lee Unkrich and Darla K. Anderson**‡; The Boss Baby – Tom McGrath and Ramsey Naito; The Breadwinner – Nora Twomey and Anthony Leo; Ferdinand – Carlos Saldanha and Lori Forte; Loving Vincent – Dorota Kobiela, Hugh Welchman and Ivan Mactaggart	**Best Foreign Language Film**: **A Fantastic Woman (Chile) in Spanish – Directed by Sebastián Lelio**‡; The Insult (Lebanon) in Arabic – Directed by Ziad Doueiri; Loveless (Russia) in Russian – Directed by Andrey Zvyagintsev; On Body and Soul (Hungary) in Hungarian – Directed by Ildikó Enyedi; The Square (Sweden) in Swedish – Directed by Ruben Östlund
**Best Documentary (Feature)**: **Icarus – Bryan Fogel and Dan Cogan**‡; Abacus: Small Enough to Jail – Steve James, Mark Mitten and Julie Goldman; Faces Places – Agnès Varda, JR and Rosalie Varda; Last Men in Aleppo – Feras Fayyad, Kareem Abeed and Søren Steen Jespersen; Strong Island – Yance Ford and Joslyn Barnes	**Best Documentary (Short Subject)**: **Heaven Is a Traffic Jam on the 405 – Frank Stiefel**‡; Edith+Eddie – Laura Checkoway and Thomas Lee Wright; Heroin(e) – Elaine McMillion Sheldon and Kerrin Sheldon; Knife Skills – Thomas Lennon; Traffic Stop – Kate Davis and David Heilbroner
**Best Short Film (Live Action)**: **The Silent Child – Chris Overton and Rachel Shenton**‡; DeKalb Elementary – Reed Van Dyk; The Eleven O'Clock – Derin Seale and Josh Lawson; My Nephew Emmett – Kevin Wilson Jr.; Watu Wote/All of Us – Katja Benrath and Tobias Rosen	**Best Short Film (Animated)**: **Dear Basketball – Glen Keane and Kobe Bryant**‡; Garden Party – Victor Caire and Gabriel Grapperon; Lou – Dave Mullins and Dana Murray; Negative Space – Max Porter and Ru Kuwahata; Revolting Rhymes – Jakob Schuh and Jan Lachauer
**Best Music (Original Score)**: **The Shape of Water – Alexandre Desplat**‡; Dunkirk – Hans Zimmer; Phantom Thread – Jonny Greenwood; Star Wars: The Last Jedi – John Williams; Three Billboards Outside Ebbing, Missouri – Carter Burwell	**Best Music (Original Song)**: **"Remember Me" from Coco – Music and Lyrics by Kristen Anderson-Lopez and Robert Lopez**‡; "Mighty River" from Mudbound – Music and Lyrics by Mary J. Blige, Raphael Saadiq and Taura Stinson; "Mystery of Love" from Call Me by Your Name – Music and Lyrics by Sufjan Stevens; "Stand Up for Something" from Marshall – Music by Diane Warren; Lyrics by Common and Diane Warren; "This Is Me" from The Greatest Showman – Music and Lyrics by Benj Pasek and Justin Paul
**Best Sound Editing**: **Dunkirk – Richard King and Alex Gibson**‡; Baby Driver – Julian Slater; Blade Runner 2049 – Mark Mangini and Theo Green; The Shape of Water – Nathan Robitaille and Nelson Ferreira; Star Wars: The Last Jedi – Matthew Wood and Ren Klyce	**Best Sound Mixing**: **Dunkirk – Gregg Landaker, Gary A. Rizzo and Mark Weingarten**‡; Baby Driver – Julian Slater, Tim Cavagin and Mary H. Ellis; Blade Runner 2049 – Ron Bartlett, Doug Hemphill and Mac Ruth; The Shape of Water – Christian Cooke, Brad Zoern and Glen Gauthier; Star Wars: The Last Jedi – David Parker, Michael Semanick, Ren Klyce and Stuart Wilson
**Best Production Design**: **The Shape of Water – Production Design: Paul Denham Austerberry; Set Decoration: Shane Vieau and Jeffrey A. Melvin**‡; Beauty and the Beast – Production Design: Sarah Greenwood; Set Decoration: Katie Spencer; Blade Runner 2049 – Production Design: Dennis Gassner; Set Decoration: Alessandra Querzola; Darkest Hour – Production Design: Sarah Greenwood; Set Decoration: Katie Spencer; Dunkirk – Production Design: Nathan Crowley; Set Decoration: Gary Fettis	**Best Cinematography**: **Blade Runner 2049 – Roger A. Deakins**‡; Darkest Hour – Bruno Delbonnel; Dunkirk – Hoyte van Hoytema; Mudbound – Rachel Morrison; The Shape of Water – Dan Laustsen
**Best Makeup and Hairstyling**: **Darkest Hour – Kazuhiro Tsuji, David Malinowski and Lucy Sibbick**‡; Victoria & Abdul – Daniel Phillips and Lou Sheppard; Wonder – Arjen Tuiten	**Best Costume Design**: **Phantom Thread – Mark Bridges**‡; Beauty and the Beast – Jacqueline Durran; Darkest Hour – Jacqueline Durran; The Shape of Water – Luis Sequeira; Victoria & Abdul – Consolata Boyle
**Best Film Editing**: **Dunkirk – Lee Smith**‡; Baby Driver – Paul Machliss and Jonathan Amos; I, Tonya – Tatiana S. Riegel; The Shape of Water – Sidney Wolinsky; Three Billboards Outside Ebbing, Missouri – Jon Gregory	**Best Visual Effects**: **Blade Runner 2049 – John Nelson, Gerd Nefzer, Paul Lambert and Richard R. Hoover**‡; Guardians of the Galaxy Vol. 2 – Christopher Townsend, Guy Williams, Jonathan Fawkner and Dan Sudick; Kong: Skull Island – Stephen Rosenbaum, Jeff White, Scott Benza and Mike Meinardus; Star Wars: The Last Jedi – Ben Morris, Mike Mulholland, Neal Scanlan and Chris Corbould; War for the Planet of the Apes – Joe Letteri, Daniel Barrett, Dan Lemmon and Joel Whist

=== Governors Awards ===
The Academy held its 9th annual Governors Awards ceremony on November 11, 2017, during which the following awards were presented:

==== Special Award ====
- To Alejandro G. Iñárritu's Carne y Arena virtual reality installation, in recognition of a visionary and powerful experience in storytelling

==== Honorary Awards ====
- To Charles Burnett, a resolutely independent and influential film pioneer who has chronicled the lives of black Americans with eloquence and insight
- To Owen Roizman, whose expansive visual style and technical innovation have advanced the art of cinematography
- To Donald Sutherland for a lifetime of indelible characters, rendered with unwavering truthfulness
- To Agnès Varda, whose compassion and curiosity inform a uniquely personal cinema

=== Films with multiple nominations and awards ===
Films that received multiple nominations
Nominations	Film
13	The Shape of Water
8	Dunkirk
7	Three Billboards Outside Ebbing, Missouri
6	Darkest Hour
6	Phantom Thread
5	Blade Runner 2049
5	Lady Bird
4	Call Me by Your Name
4	Get Out
4	Mudbound
4	Star Wars: The Last Jedi
3	Baby Driver
3	I, Tonya
2	Beauty and the Beast
2	Coco
2	The Post
2	Victoria & Abdul

Films that received multiple awards
Awards	Film
4	The Shape of Water
3	Dunkirk
2	Blade Runner 2049
2	Coco
2	Darkest Hour
2	Three Billboards Outside Ebbing, Missouri

== Presenters and performers ==
The following individuals, listed in order of appearance, presented awards or performed musical numbers.

=== Presenters ===
Name(s)	Role
Randy Thomas	Served as announcer for the 90th annual Academy Awards
Viola Davis	Presented the award for Best Supporting Actor
Gal Gadot; Armie Hammer	Presented the award for Best Makeup and Hairstyling
Eva Marie Saint	Presented the award for Best Costume Design
Laura Dern; Greta Gerwig	Presented the award for Best Documentary Feature
Taraji P. Henson	Introduced the performance of Best Original Song nominee "Mighty River"
Ansel Elgort; Eiza González	Presented the awards for Best Sound Editing and Best Sound Mixing
Kumail Nanjiani; Lupita Nyong'o	Presented the award for Best Production Design
Eugenio Derbez	Introduced the performance of Best Original Song nominee "Remember Me"
Rita Moreno	Presented the award for Best Foreign Language Film
Mahershala Ali	Presented the award for Best Supporting Actress
BB-8; Mark Hamill; Oscar Isaac; Kelly Marie Tran	Presented the awards for Best Animated Short Film and Best Animated Feature Film
Daniela Vega	Introduced the performance of Best Original Song nominee "Mystery of Love"
Tom Holland; Gina Rodriguez	Presented the award for Best Visual Effects
Matthew McConaughey	Presented the award for Best Film Editing
Tiffany Haddish; Maya Rudolph	Presented the awards for Best Documentary Short Subject and Best Live Action Short Film
Dave Chappelle	Introduced the performance of Best Original Song nominee "Stand Up for Something"
Ashley Judd; Salma Hayek Pinault; Annabella Sciorra	Presenters of a special presentation highlighting the Time's Up movement and diversity in film
Chadwick Boseman; Margot Robbie	Presented the award for Best Adapted Screenplay
Nicole Kidman	Presented the award for Best Original Screenplay
Wes Studi	Presenter of a special presentation highlighting depictions of the U.S. military in film
Sandra Bullock	Presented the award for Best Cinematography
Zendaya	Introduced the performance of Best Original Song nominee "This Is Me"
Christopher Walken	Presented the award for Best Original Score
Emily Blunt; Lin-Manuel Miranda	Presented the award for Best Original Song
Jennifer Garner	Presented the "In Memoriam" tribute
Emma Stone	Presented the award for Best Director
Jane Fonda; Helen Mirren	Presented the award for Best Actor
Jodie Foster; Jennifer Lawrence	Presented the award for Best Actress
Warren Beatty; Faye Dunaway	Presented the award for Best Picture

=== Performers ===
Name(s)	Role	Performed
Harold Wheeler	Musical arranger Conductor	Orchestral
Mary J. Blige	Performer	"Mighty River" from Mudbound
Gael García Bernal; Miguel; Natalia Lafourcade	Performers	"Remember Me" from Coco
Sufjan Stevens; St. Vincent; Moses Sumney; Chris Thile	Performers	"Mystery of Love" from Call Me by Your Name
Andra Day; Common	Performers	"Stand Up for Something" from Marshall
Keala Settle	Performer	"This Is Me" from The Greatest Showman
Eddie Vedder	Performer	"Room at the Top" during the annual "In Memoriam" tribute

== Ceremony information ==
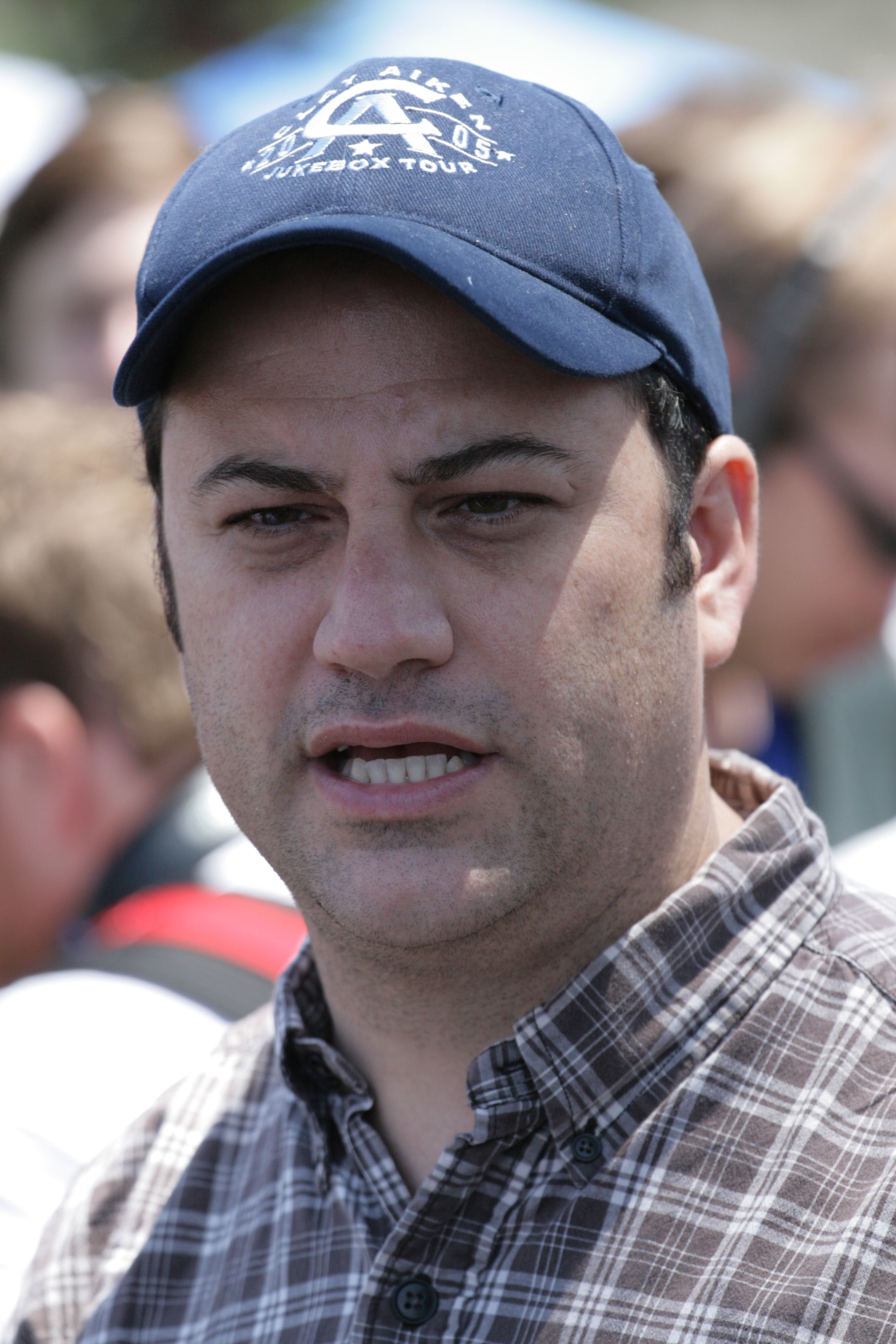
Jimmy Kimmel hosted the 90th Academy Awards

Despite the mixed reception received by the preceding year's ceremony, the Academy rehired Michael De Luca and Jennifer Todd as producers for the second consecutive year. In May 2017, it was announced that Jimmy Kimmel would return as host for a second consecutive year. “Mike and Jennifer produced a beautiful show that was visually stunning. And Jimmy proved, from his opening monologue all the way through a finale we could never have imagined, that he is one our finest hosts in Oscar history,” said AMPAS president Cheryl Boone Isaacs in a press release announcing the return of the show's producers and hosts. Kimmel expressed that he was thrilled to be selected to emcee the gala again, commenting, "Hosting the Oscars was a highlight of my career and I am grateful to Cheryl [Boone Isaacs], Dawn [Hudson], and the Academy for asking me to return to work with two of my favorite people, Mike De Luca and Jennifer Todd. If you think we screwed up the ending this year, wait until you see what we have planned for the 90th anniversary show!" Kimmel became the first person to host consecutive ceremonies since Billy Crystal hosted the 69th and 70th ceremonies held in 1997 and 1998 respectively. In an allusion to the previous year's Best Picture announcement error, the official poster for the event featured the tagline "What could possibly go wrong?"

Several others participated in the production of the ceremony and related events. Harold Wheeler served as musical director for the ceremony. Production designer Derek McLane designed a new stage for the ceremony which prominently featured a curtain made of forty-five million Swarovski crystals. During the nominations announcement, several vignettes featuring Priyanka Chopra, Rosario Dawson, Gal Gadot, Salma Hayek, Michelle Rodriguez, Zoe Saldaña, Molly Shannon, Rebel Wilson and Michelle Yeoh were shown before several categories highlighting the importance of below-the-line crafts in the film production. Four days prior to the ceremony, the Academy in conjunction with the Los Angeles Philharmonic hosted a special concert at the Walt Disney Concert Hall highlighting the Best Original Score nominees and the involvement of music in the film making process. During the performance of Best Original Song nominee "Stand Up for Something", ten individuals such as activist Dolores Huerta, Me Too movement founder Tarana Burke, chef and humanitarian José Andrés, and author Janet Mock appeared onstage to represent people who epitomized the message of the song. In view of the previous year's Best Picture announcement error, actors Warren Beatty and Faye Dunaway returned to present the award again.

Traditionally, the previous year's Best Actor winner usually presented the Best Actress award. However, Best Actor winner Casey Affleck reportedly decided not to attend the ceremony due to his sexual harassment accusations. Jodie Foster and Jennifer Lawrence presented the award together in his place. The Best Actor award was presented by actresses Jane Fonda and Helen Mirren.

=== Box office performance of Best Picture nominated films ===
North American box office gross for Best Picture nominees
Film	Pre-nomination (before Jan. 23)	Post-nomination (Jan. 23 – Mar. 4)	Post-awards (after Mar. 5)	Total
Dunkirk	$188 million	–	–	$188 million
Get Out	$175.7 million	$353,795	–	$176 million
The Post	$45.8 million	$34.8 million	$1.4 million	$81.9 million
The Shape of Water	$30.4 million	$27.2 million	$6.3 million	$63.9 million
Darkest Hour	$41.1 million	$14.5 million	$918,003	$56.5 million
Three Billboards Outside Ebbing, Missouri	$32.3 million	$19.9 million	$2.3 million	$54.5 million
Lady Bird	$39.2 million	$9.2 million	$636,405	$49 million
Phantom Thread	$6.4 million	$13.9 million	$911,496	$21.2 million
Call Me by Your Name	$9.4 million	$7.5 million	$1.2 million	$18.1 million
Total	$568.2 million	$127.3 million	$13.6 million	$708.5 million
Average	$63.1 million	$14.1 million	$1.5 million	$78.8 million

At the time of the nominations announcement on January 23, 2018, the combined gross of the nine Best Picture nominees at the North American box offices was $568.2 million, with an average of $63.1 million per film. When the nominations were announced, Dunkirk was the highest-grossing film among the Best Picture nominees with $188 million in domestic box office receipts. Get Out was the second-highest-grossing film with $175.6 million, followed by The Post ($45.7 million), Darkest Hour ($41 million), Lady Bird ($39.1 million), Three Billboards Outside Ebbing, Missouri ($32.2 million), The Shape of Water ($30.4 million), Call Me by Your Name ($9.1 million), and Phantom Thread ($6.3 million).

=== Critical reviews ===
The show received a mixed reception from media publications. Some media outlets received the broadcast positively. Hank Stuever of The Washington Post remarked, "In his second year, Kimmel has shown that the telecast needn't be anything but sharp and sure, with a funny host whose bits are manageable, shareable and – best of all – forgotten. We're not making showbiz history here; we're just trying to get through another Oscar night." CNN's Brian Lowry quipped, "The Oscars are a big, unwieldy beast, which invariably try to serve too many masters. Yet if the intent was ultimately to maintain a celebratory tone without ignoring either the outside world or the elephant in the room throughout this year's awards, host Jimmy Kimmel and the show itself largely succeeded." Television critic Daniel Fienberg of The Hollywood Reporter wrote, "How did Kimmel do overall? With the exception of the theater stunt and two unnecessary toss-off Matt Damon jokes — Kimmel really can't resist — I thought he was good, probably even better than last year."

Others were more critical of the show. Television critic Maureen Ryan of Variety said, "All things considered, the show had a more or less low-key vibe. Normally it takes about two hours for the numbing effect to set in, but despite host Jimmy Kimmel's best efforts, Sunday's telecast started to feel a bit languid and low-energy far earlier." She also added, "The ceremony probably felt so ambiguous and conflicted in part because everyone in that room — and many at home — know how much more work needs to be done before true inclusion is the norm and all the offenders are driven from the industry." Time television columnist Daniel D'Addario commented, "Kimmel, a talk show host who has been inspiring and catalyzing in the past year while discussing issues personally connected to him, seemed flat and uninspired in his monologue when dealing with topics that demanded laceration." David Wiegand of the San Francisco Chronicle wrote, "Even the hope that the noise of clapping might keep the audience at home and in the theater awake, there was little of that for anything except the entrance of actors of advance age."

=== Ratings and reception ===
The American telecast on ABC drew in an average of 26.54 million people over its length, which was a 19% decrease from the previous year's ceremony. The show also earned lower Nielsen ratings compared to the previous ceremony with 18.9% of households watching the ceremony over a 32 share. In addition, it garnered a lower 18–49 demo rating with a 6.8 rating among viewers in that demographic. At the time, it earned the lowest viewership for an Academy Award telecast since figures were compiled beginning with the 46th ceremony in 1974. It was the seventh most watched television broadcast in the United States in 2018 among all viewers and the eleventh most watched among the 18–49 demo; in both groups it ranked behind only sport events and the "Super Bowl Sunday" episode of This Is Us.

In July 2018, the ceremony presentation received eight nominations for the 70th Primetime Emmy Awards. Two months later, the ceremony won one of those nominations for Glenn Weiss's direction of the telecast.

== "In Memoriam" ==
The annual "In Memoriam" segment was introduced by Jennifer Garner. Singer Eddie Vedder performed the Tom Petty song "Room at the Top" during the tribute.

- John G. Avildsen – Director
- Toni Ann Walker – Hairstylist
- June Foray – Actress, animator
- Walter Lassally – Cinematographer
- Chuck Berry – Singer-songwriter
- Robert Osborne – Columnist, television host, writer
- Jill Messick – Producer
- Harry Dean Stanton – Actor
- Terence Marsh – Production designer
- Rita Riggs – Costume designer
- Mary Goldberg – Casting director
- Anthony Harvey – Director, film editor
- Thérèse DePrez – Production designer
- Debra Chasnoff – Documentarian
- Jóhann Jóhannsson – Composer
- Jonathan Demme – Director
- Michael Ballhaus – Cinematographer
- Les Lazarowitz – Sound mixer
- Idrissa Ouédraogo – Director, writer
- Joe Hyams – Public Relations
- John Heard – Actor
- Martin Landau – Actor
- Glenne Headly – Actress
- Eric Zumbrunnen – Film editor
- Roger Moore – Actor
- Sam Shepard – Actor, writer
- Allison Shearmur – Executive, producer
- John Mollo – Costume designer
- Jeanne Moreau – Actress, director
- Loren Janes – Stuntman
- George A. Romero – Director, producer
- Rance Howard – Actor
- Sridevi – Actress
- Haruo Nakajima – Actor
- Martin Ransohoff – Producer
- Hiep Thi Le – Actress
- Ron Berkeley – Makeup artist
- Joseph Bologna – Actor, writer
- Fred J. Koenekamp – Cinematographer
- Murray Lerner – Documentarian
- Don Rickles – Actor, comedian
- Seijun Suzuki – Director
- Bernie Casey – Actor
- Shashi Kapoor – Actor, producer
- Tom Sanders – Production designer
- Danielle Darrieux – Actress
- Jerry Greenberg – Film editor
- Brad Grey – Executive producer, manager
- Míriam Colón – Actress
- Luis Bacalov – Composer
- Jerry Lewis – Actor, comedian, director, writer

== See also ==
- 75th Golden Globe Awards
- 24th Screen Actors Guild Awards
- 71st British Academy Film Awards
- 38th Brit Awards
- 60th Annual Grammy Awards
- 42nd Laurence Olivier Awards
- 72nd Tony Awards
- List of oldest and youngest Academy Award winners and nominees – Youngest nominees for Best Actor in a Leading Role
- List of submissions to the 90th Academy Awards for Best Foreign Language Film
