= Mindy Alper =

American artist

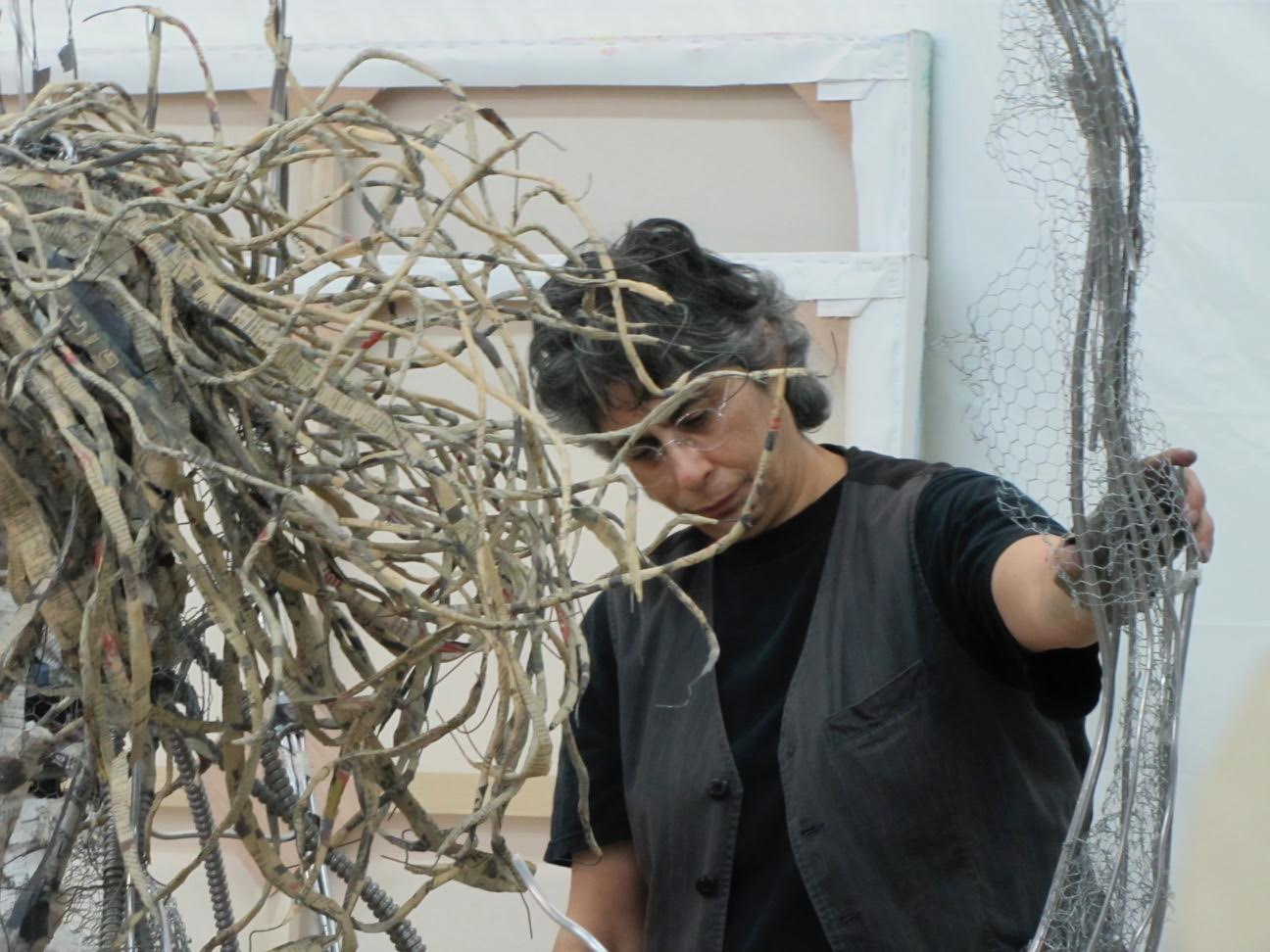
- Born: 1959 (age 66–67); Brooklyn, New York, United States
- Education: Los Angeles City College
- Known for: Drawing, sculpture

Mindy Alper (born 1959) is an American artist who lives in Greater Los Angeles. Her drawings, paintings, and sculptures focus on the representation of people, either in portraiture or as figures who embody aspects of her inner experience. She has been praised for her ability to articulate complex and profound emotions in her work. Among her art media are paint (oil and acrylic), ink, marker pen, papier-mâché, clay, and wood. She was a performance artist in the 1980s, and she plays guitar and violin. Alper is represented by Rosamund Felsen Gallery.

Alper is the subject of the documentary film Heaven Is a Traffic Jam on the 405 (2016), which won the Academy Award for Best Documentary (Short Subject) in 2018.

== Early life and education ==
Alper was born into a Jewish family in Brooklyn, New York in 1959; she was the second of four children, and the only girl. When she was age two, her family moved to Los Angeles, where she has lived ever since. As a child, Alper had a phobia of touching others and of being touched, for fear that her touch was poisonous. By age four or five, she was drawing prolifically, and she found that drawing relieved her anxiety.

Alper's parents hired visual artist Dorothy Cannon to tutor her in art. The lessons were in Cannon's home: a creatively decorated and inspiring place filled with music. For her students, Cannon read aloud nonsense verse by Lewis Carroll and Edward Lear. She worked with a variety of media, and introduced Alper to papier-mâché (a medium Alper was still using 50 years later). They made a mask together, and Alper continued making masks until she shifted her subject to people and the human form.

Alper later attended an alternative school in Highland Park. In 1974, she began to learn puppet-making from marionettist Harry Burnett. Burnett, who was then in his mid-seventies, was spending his winter years teaching such skills to children, the elderly, and the disabled. "I made really intricate marionettes that took me months to finish," Alper recalls. "I wanted to have control over something and I had control of my marionettes—but, oddly enough, I never played with them. I always gave them away shortly after I finished them."

In 1976, Alper enrolled at Immaculate Heart College, a Catholic private college in Los Angeles, but she was distressed by the way the nuns treated her. In 1978 she transferred to Los Angeles City College, where she continued her education in art until 1983. In the mid-1980s, when Alper was 27, she had a mental breakdown and lost the ability to speak, write, or think in words. Eventually she was able to communicate by rearranging pre-printed words. In 1994, faced with severe depression, Alper opted for electroconvulsive therapy, which left her with some parts of her brain permanently damaged.

Through all the changes in her life, Alper remained close to her first art teacher, Dorothy Cannon, until Cannon's death in 1999. When Cannon died, Alper was at her bedside holding her hand. Some years later, she studied with painter and professor Susanna Maing of Occidental College. She also approached Bolivian-American painter Tom Wudl. Alper had an upcoming show, and was feeling very anxious about it. She was also afraid that she had lost her creativity. "Tom promised me that we are creativity itself, and that he could help me find that in myself again," Alper said. Wudl invited her to study under him at no charge. Since then, she has worked with Wudl for several years.

Among Alper's art media are oil and acrylic paint, papier-mâché, clay, ink, and marker pen. When she eventually tired of papier-mâché, she began to study wood carving. She plays guitar and violin, and reports that all of her family members were musical. Her mother, she says, also aspired to be a painter, but hid her paintings from her children.

== Career ==
=== Teaching ===
Alper taught alongside her mentor, Cannon, off and on from 1976 to 1995. In the late 1970s she was a teaching assistant at Area H Alternative School, one of the first alternative schools in Los Angeles. In 1986 she taught art on a voluntary basis to terminally ill teenagers at Children's Hospital Los Angeles.

It was around this time that she met Marc Sirinsky, who was directing a theatre group called Imagination Workshop. His wife, Catherine Coulson (the "Log Lady" of Twin Peaks), became one of her students, and also a good friend. "I got to know Mindy… when I came to have her help me draw a log, and we really connected," Coulson explains. During a period in 1992 when Alper lost the power of speech, Coulson acted as an intermediary to help her answer questions for an interview with Kristine McKenna. At the time of the interview, Sirinsky was working on a play intended to adapt Alper's drawings for the stage.

Susan Arnold, a film producer and casting director, also met Alper through the Workshop. When she was producing Benny & Joon (1993), she arranged for Alper to help Mary Stuart Masterson prepare for her role as a mentally ill young woman who falls in love with a mime artist.

Alper ceased giving private instruction in 2001. In 2006, she was a visiting artist at the California Institute of the Arts, for the benefit of an experimental drawing class there.

=== Exhibitions ===
From 1982 to 1989, Alper was active in the theatre: first as a member of a performance art and comedy group called the Love Machine, and then with the Buttersticks, a performance art troupe that she co-founded. In 1984, her papier-mâché work was featured in the journal Fiberarts. She has exhibited her paintings and sculpture in several community venues around Los Angeles. After an exhibition at Random Gallery of Highland Park in 1988, she returned for a solo show in 1994, called "Drawing on the Wrong Side of the Brain", followed by a few group shows in the late 1990s. Among her other solo shows are Raddack Gallery in 1987, and Sincere Technologies Gallery of Oakland in 1989. Rosamund Felsen Gallery of Los Angeles, which has represented her since 2006, hosted shows for her in 2006, 2007, and 2013.

The 2006 and 2007 shows demonstrated Alper's drawings in ink and marker pen. In 2013, she exhibited alongside abstractionist painter Marcia Roberts. Alper's exhibit featured more than 20 pieces, including papier-mâché sculpture and ink drawing. In 2016 the gallery closed its space on Santa Fe Avenue in Downtown Los Angeles, and has operated as a website since then. The gallery's final group show, Celebration (2016), included three untitled Alper drawings in ink and marker pen.

=== Illustration ===
Chamber musician Jay Hosler is the nephew of Dorothy Cannon, Alper's mentor, and has known Alper since she was about five years old. When he and fellow musician Peggy Harrison began writing children's literature together, Alper agreed to illustrate their first story: a chapter book called Norm and Burny: The Black Square. The Black Square was published in 2013, and it includes 23 drawings. Its sequel, The Girl with the Gold Coin (2014), is also illustrated by Alper. In the books, Norm is a 12-year-old boy who goes on adventures with his (somewhat wiser) canine companion, Burny.

== Content ==
Alper's work is representational. While she sometimes paints or sculpts portraits, much of her output comprises line drawings and paintings that are expressive of her emotional state, or which evidence the workings of the unconscious. Her figures are human (or humanoid), and sometimes anthropomorphic. Cannon recalled that, as a child, Alper had "an unusual capacity for dipping into her subconscious and doing drawings from that point of view"; she described Alper's memory as "photographic". Journalist and art curator Kristine McKenna esteemed Alper's work from early childhood as "remarkably sophisticated in their technical polish and psychological complexity". Writing in 2018, film critic Richard Brody was impressed by Alper's ability to capture powerful emotion and potent memories with such precision and sincerity. He found her portraits to be "brilliant [and] moving".

During a ten-year period when she lost the power of speech for long stretches, her work changed: "I was very prolific with my drawing," Alper says, "and I think that I was telling more complete stories—maybe because I so desperately was trying to communicate."

== Documentary ==
While studying at Tom Wudl Studio in the 2010s, Alper caught the attention of B. J. Dockweiler, a fellow painter and classmate. Dockweiler was fascinated by Alper's work and disposition. Dockweiler's husband, Frank Stiefel, was equally intrigued when he met Alper at a group show and saw some of her pieces. He talked with Alper occasionally, as they attended some of the same art openings. He asked if he could film her as she worked on one of her newest pieces: a monumental bust of her therapist, Shoshana Gerson. After a few months of filming, Stiefel interviewed Alper on camera; five more interviews followed, and Alper's story emerged. The film, Heaven Is a Traffic Jam on the 405, premiered at the Austin Film Festival in 2016, where it won the Jury Award and the Audience Award in the "Documentary Short" category. The Jury Award qualified the film for an Academy Award nomination. At the 90th Academy Awards in 2018, it won the Academy Award for Best Documentary (Short Subject).
