= Watu =

Watu may refer to:

- Western Approaches Tactical Unit, a unit of the British Royal Navy created in January 1942.
- Watu Wote, 2017 German film.
