= Salah Farah =

Kenyan teacher

Salah Farah in the hospital after being shot by al-Shabab for refusing to be separated from Christian travellers

Salah Abdow Farah was a Kenyan teacher who lost his life after defending his fellow passengers on a bus. He survived the December 2015 attack but died on January 18, 2016, from complications after a surgery to remove a bullet lodged in his hip. His story of courage inspired the short film Watu Wote by Katja Benrath. At the time of his death, Farah was the Deputy Headteacher of Mandera Township Primary School.

== Background ==
On 20 December 2015, Farah was in a bus bound for the town of Mandera in northern Kenya. The bus was attacked by suspected Al-Shabaab militants. In a similar attack the year before, the attackers had separated passengers according to faith. Those who could prove they were Muslim, by reciting passages from the Quran, were spared. Those who couldn't were lined up and shot. 28 people were killed, with the only person, Douglas Ochwodho, surviving by a stroke of luck.

Farah's bus was stopped near the town of El-Wak on the Kenya–Somali border. Knowing what would happen, female Muslim passengers gave their head scarves to the non-Muslims on the bus. Then Farah and other passengers refused to be separated, telling the attackers to "...kill all of us or leave us alone."

== Death ==
For his act of defiance, he was shot in the hand and hip. Two other male passengers were fatally shot, as well as an off-duty policeman who happened to be in a different car. The militants then escaped, leaving Farah critically injured. He was airlifted to Nairobi for specialised treatment where he died one month later during surgery. His body was airlifted by a police helicopter to his home, where he was buried in a quiet ceremony.

== Personal life ==
Farah was married to Dunia Mohammed Ahmed. They had four children, and his wife was pregnant with a fifth, at the time of his death. Kenyans launched an online fundraising activity, christened #HeroSalah, to raise money to support his young family.

== Legacy and Film ==
In an interview before his death, Farah said "It's only the religion that is the difference, so I ask my brother Muslims to take care of the Christians so that the Christians also take care of us... and let us help one another and let us live together peacefully."

He was posthumously awarded the Order of the Grand Warrior, a Kenyan civilian honour for risking your own life to save another, during the subsequent State of the Nation address. The Kenyan President, Uhuru Kenyatta, said Farah "...is a costly reminder that we all have a role to protecting our freedoms."

Farah's story received international coverage, attracting the attention of German actress and filmmaker Katja Benrath. Benrath chose the story for her graduation project, which became the film Watu Wote: All of Us. The critically acclaimed film won an award at the Student Academy Award, and was nominated for Academy Award for Best Live Action Short Film.
