= Petropoulos (surname) =

Petropoulos is a Greek surname. Notable people with the name include:

- Andreas Petropoulos (born 1996), Greek basketball player
- Antonis Petropoulos (born in 1986), Greek footballer
- Elias Petropoulos (1928–2003), Greek author and urban historian
- Georgios Petropoulos (1872–1937), Greek fencer
- Jonathan Petropoulos (born 1961), American historian
- Kostas Petropoulos (born 1956), Greek basketball player and coach
- Lakis Petropoulos (1932–1996), Greek footballer and manager
- Renee Petropoulos (born 1954), American contemporary artist and educator
