= Max Porter =

Max Porter may refer to:

- Max Porter (footballer)
- Max Porter (animator)
- Max Porter (writer)
