= Tom Knechtel =

American visual artist (born 1952)

Tom Knechtel (born 1952) is an American visual artist and educator who makes figurative and allegorical artworks that explore, through a variety of mediums including painting, drawing, collage, and printmaking, themes of human vulnerability, animal nature, and personal grief using a dreamlike vocabulary.

== Early life and education ==
Tom Knechtel was born in Palo Alto, California, in 1952 and raised in the San Francisco Bay Area. His father worked as an aeronautics engineer, while his mother had studied anthropology. Although he did not initially show interest in the visual arts, his parents fostered his appreciation for culture. His mother introduced him to the works of William Blake, and his father to those of Jean Cocteau. During his childhood, he developed an interest in creating stuffed animals inspired by characters from his favorite books, including The Wind in the Willows, which he dressed in various costumes. He also constructed a small-scale theater, demonstrating a preference for designing plays rather than having his creations perform them. After graduating from high school, Knechtel attempted to start a toy-making business. However, after a few months, the business proved unsuccessful, so he enrolled in community college, which led him to move to Southern California, where he enrolled in the California Institute of the Arts (CalArts), where he first received his Bachelor of Fine Arts (BFA) in 1974 and later his Master of Fine Arts (MFA) in 1976.

While at CalArts, Knechtel wanted to express himself through pictures and felt alienated by the dominant conceptual art scene. He found camaraderie and support within the school's feminist program, particularly in a class with Mira Schor which focused on gender, the human body, and personal identity, which resonated deeply with him. He noted that the feminist movement granted a generation of young gay male artists "incredible permission" to explore their own identity and sexuality without having to carry the same political weight as their female peers.

In 1995, Tom Knechtel began teaching in the Fine Art and Illustration programs at ArtCenter College of Design and was made full-time in 2002. Later he served as chair of the undergraduate Fine Art Department.

== Artistic practice ==
Tom Knechtel’s intricate and allegorical art practice is grounded in the synthesis of drawing from a globally diverse range of art-historical periods, such as Indian miniatures for their non-Western perspective and use of space, as well as Italian Renaissance, Mannerist, and Baroque painting, European religious art, Victorian illustrations, and medieval illuminations. Instead of conforming to a single style, Knechtel’s work blends surreal theatricality and historical eclecticism through a careful process of various mediums such as painting, drawing, and printmaking, creating an intimate stage for the intersection of human psychology, animals, and art history. Through these depictions of animals, including hares, dogs, horses, and apes, Knechtel creates a visual vocabulary central to his work and employs his characters as a metaphor for human emotion and behavior, treating them as psychological stand-ins or alter egos to examine the nuance and occasionally humorous relationships between the primal animal instincts and the constructs of human civilization. Knechtel’s work often examines themes of personal identity and loss. In his series Drawn After Life, he confronted the grief associated with the death of a loved one, his husband. Rejecting the conventional association of grief with darkness or silence, Knechtel employs vivid hues and vibrant studio imagery to convey how the potency of life and memory persist even amid intense sorrow.

== Selected exhibitions ==
In 1993, Knechtel exhibited at the Rosamund Felsen Gallery. The show featured his detailed, jewel-like paintings and pastel animal portraits that combined playful fantasy, classical traditions, and explicit yet tender eroticism.

In 1997, Knechtel had his first solo exhibition in New York at P.P.O.W. Gallery, titled Two Tales: A Ghost Story and Scheherazade, inspired by a "soul-stirring" trip the artist took to India. The exhibition was characterized by surreal, fantastical, and theatrical imagery that blended human and animal characters to explore the precarious balance between goodness and corruption.

In 2002, Tom Knechtel was the subject of a major 25-year retrospective exhibition titled On Wanting to Grow Horns: The Little Theatre of Tom Knechtel. It opened at the Weatherspoon Art Gallery in North Carolina. It later traveled to the Ben Maltz Gallery at Otis College of Art and Design in Los Angeles, the Contemporary Art Museum in Honolulu, and the Henry Art Gallery in Seattle. In these presentations, Knechtel structured his paintings like small, elaborate stage plays, aka “the little theater,” that were populated with a recurring cast of eclectic characters, wrestlers, and anthropomorphic beasts as implicated in the title, “wanting to grow horns." Knechtel’s characters often morph into hybrid animal-human forms or mythical creatures, and address themes of queer identity, desire, and the existential challenges of contemporary life.

The Walled City, 2006, Oil on Linen, 54" x 48"

In 2007, Marc Selwyn Fine Art hosted an exhibition featuring paintings and drawings by Knechtel. The exhibition's title and central work, The Walled City, inspired by Tibetan thangka paintings and Indian miniature painting, present an intricate surreal construct of densely narrative-driven visual worlds inhabited by animal-human characters.

In 2023, Knechtel presented his Drawn After Life at P.P.O.W. Gallery in New York, a body of work created over the five years since his husband, Rabbi Robert Baruch, died. The work visually explores the emotions of grief, memory, and survival, using vibrant imagery to show that the world remains jarringly alive even during periods of mourning.

== Collections ==
Tom Knechtel's work is in the collections of the Berardo Collection, Sintra Museum of Modern Art, Portugal; Museum of Modern Art, New York; Museum of Contemporary Art, Los Angeles; Hammer Museum, Los Angeles; Los Angeles County Museum of Art; Fine Arts Museums of San Francisco; San Francisco Museum of Modern Art; Orange County Museum of Art; and Long Beach Museum of Art.

== Awards ==
Tom Knechtel is the recipient of awards and fellowships from the MacDowell Colony fellowship, the Joan Mitchell Foundation Painters and Sculptors Grant, COLA 2016, City of Los Angeles Individual Artist Fellowship and the California Community Foundation Fellowship for Visual Artists.
