= Steve Hurd =

American contemporary artist (born 1956)

- Born: 1956 (age 69–70); Washington, D.C., U.S.
- Education: San Francisco Art Institute (BFA) University of California, Los Angeles (MFA)
- Known for: Painting, Site-specific art
- Awards: City of Los Angeles (COLA) Artist Fellowship, Louis Comfort Tiffany Foundation

Steve Hurd (born 1956) is an American contemporary artist who uses found materials to examine consumer culture, mass media, and sociopolitical issues through painting and installation. He lives in Los Angeles.

== Early life and education ==
Born at the Walter Reed Army Medical Center in Washington, D.C., in 1956, Hurd's early life was marked by frequent moves due to his father's career as a U.S. Army military officer and physician. In the 1960s, his family relocated to San Francisco when his father was stationed at Letterman Army Hospital on the Presidio military base during the Vietnam War. This period significantly impacted Hurd, as he observed the wounded returning from the war and the San Francisco counterculture and protest movement's resistance, leading him to grapple with conflicting emotions. He struggled to reconcile the political aspects of the war with his admiration for his father's military service. These complex feelings later influenced his approach to art, culminating in his R.I.P. painting series, which both criticized the Iraq War and honored the fallen soldiers.

Hurd earned a Bachelor of Fine Arts (BFA) from the San Francisco Art Institute (SFAI) in 1979. Subsequently, he pursued graduate studies at the University of California, Los Angeles (UCLA), where he studied with Chris Burden, Paul McCarthy, and Mike Kelley. He was awarded a Master of Fine Arts (MFA) in the New Genres Department (UCLA) in 1988.

== Artistic practice ==
Upon graduating from UCLA, Hurd began exploring the idea that location can be the subject of an artwork and created site-specific works that used visual elements, often with paint, to discuss aspects of the specific place. This contextual approach led him to shift toward paintings derived from found source materials, transforming cultural detritus into socially and politically charged works.

Hurd's paintings employ a loosely naturalistic, drippy oil paint or adopt a blocky, painterly pixelation reminiscent of early computer graphics to reinterpret found source materials such as advertising flyers, magazine covers, art reviews, product logos, news photos, and his own agitated scribblings. This approach to painting plays a key role in Hurd's investigation into the nature of images and representation, offering a critique of contemporary society and serving as a methodical exploration of painting itself, reminding viewers that they are looking at a painted object.

=== Artworks and projects ===
Easy Icy Watermelon Dessert, 1997

Women's Day & Family Circle magazine covers, a series of drippy paintings from 1996 to 2022, were fertile ground for Hurd's critical commentary on mass media and domestic life. These covers, with their visual overload and overt commercialization of guilty pleasures and cultural anxieties, employed bold text to further manipulate readers into buying back their own hopes, fears, and dreams. Examples include phrases like "Could your pet be making you sick?", "How your dreams can solve your problems", and "How real women find the time to exercise!" all while prominently featuring images of extravagant cakes and cookies alongside splashy written phrases such as "Desserts your family will love!" With their runny washes and drips, Hurd's women's magazine paintings produce a fluid denigration of their subject matter. Transforming the content into a visceral experience that invites a second look at what these magazines are promoting.

Should Never Be Exhibited, 2006

Frequently, Hurd adopts a critical and sarcastic stance towards figures of authority. In 1996, after receiving a negative review of his exhibition in the LA Times, he created a wall-sized painting entitled Safe Passage, depicting the entire newspaper section featuring everything on the page, including his review. Utilizing his drippy paint technique, he blurred and dissolved the text, then incorporated trompe l'oeil renderings of malt liquor bottles along the periphery of the newspaper's layout. The Times critic had stated Hurd’s paintings “are as empty as its throwaway subject matter,” giving Hurd the idea to paint what he considered an empty review. As literary and media theorist Laurence A. Rickels put it, "Hurd remakes the LA Times journalist’s judgment upon the show before-that his work is empty just like its throwaway subject matter-into a performative self-sentence, thereby raising the newspaper phrase as it destroys itself towards the power of writing”. In these works Hurd turns the tables on those in charge by using the power of paint, displaying artistic independence, and exposing the weaknesses of their arguments, all while refusing to submit to authority. In a separate piece titled, Should Never Be Exhibited 2006, serving as an introduction to Hurd’s exhibition at Rosamund Felsen Gallery, he transcribed a supervisor's letter of reprimand in paint, concerning his communication skills—deemed offensive and disrespectful—into what curator/critic Christopher Bedford called a "dripping, sardonic script."

Snuggled Snuggle, 1999, 30' x 12' multi-paneled, free-standing, acrylic emulsion on shaped canvas.

Untitled (R.I. P. series), oil on canvas, 2008

While some of Hurd's paintings may initially seem familiar or humorous, such as Snuggled Snuggle—a 30-by-12-foot, multi-paneled, free-standing cutout of a well-known fabric softener's logo that incorporates its name, which he arranged to snuggle itself, his work can challenge how images are perceived by encouraging viewers to re-examine previously "understood" imagery. Hurd's painterly alterations introduce additional visual layers of meaning, thereby increasing the impact of disturbing or sensitive images, as seen in his R.I.P. series of 2008, which features chunky pixelated paintings based on photographs of flag-draped coffins returning to the United States from the Iraq War. By hand-painting the mechanical reproduction of the digitized image, Hurd imbues the picture with a human quality, serving as a metaphor for how individual soldiers retain their inherent humanity despite being part of an automated system. The R.I.P. series is not only meant to honor the Fallen Soldiers, but point out the mistakes of war, as Hurd puts it, “You’re seeing the flag on the coffin. It’s about the country going down, besides the individual. The flag is on the coffin, and the coffin’s going in the ground. And that’s America. They’re not just burying the soldiers. The pallbearers are burying America.”

=== Site-specific works ===
In 1988, Hurd stacked trash in the front windows of the alternative art space, Artist Television Access (ATA), located in San Francisco. Where he spray-painted the iconic city's landscape, including the Golden Gate Bridge and Coit Tower, onto the pile of debris in a work he called Trash This Town. Meant to highlight how an attractive, iconic tourist town, known for its cleanliness like San Francisco, generates waste and environmental issues, the same as any other urban area. Trash This Town was included in the LA Rules, a show curated by Marshall Weber at ATA.

In another work in 1991, Hurd painted a copy of Édouard Manet's controversial masterpiece Le Déjeuner sur l'herbe (The Luncheon on the Grass) on the underside of a picnic table in Los Angeles's MacArthur Park, and called it No Picnic. In the original, Manet shocked the critics of the time with his depiction of a nude woman and another scantily dressed woman bathing, while two fully clothed men relax in privacy at their countryside picnic. The Foundation Art Resources (FAR) had awarded Hurd funding to create a public artwork in the park. As a protest against Jesse Helms's efforts to defund the National Endowment for the Arts (NEA) for what Helms called obscene art, Hurd chose to conceal his artwork from the public and placed the commissioned piece under one of the park's many picnic benches.

Steve Hurd Fine Art, Santa Monica 1993

In a 1993 commentary on the Art Market, Hurd founded his own art gallery in a dumpster within a Santa Monica art mall's parking lot, which the established galleries used as their waste bin. Cleaning out anything other than dry trash, he branded the dumpster space Steve Hurd Fine Art, and filled it with artworks of artists he admired, such as Jason Rhoades, Paul McCarthy, Martin Kersels, Toba Khedoori, Manuel O’Campo, and Skip Arnold, and others. Steve Hurd Fine Art was part of a one-night art event called Mondo-Lot, organized by Dianna Cohen. Visitors to Steve Hurd Fine Art received flashlights and an exhibition checklist tasked with sifting through the trash of the other art venues to discover the desired works of the artists represented by Hurd’s Gallery. This temporary foray into art sales, conducted in the refuse space of the art marketplace, invites reflection on art's transient nature and the intertwined relationships between artist, gallerist, and collector.

== Exhibitions, honors, and collections ==
Hurd has shown individually at Galerie Vedovi, Brussels; Jack Tilton Gallery, New York; Dan Bernier Gallery, Los Angeles, and Rosamund Felsen Gallery, Santa Monica.

Hurd is the recipient of the 2012 City of Los Angeles (COLA) Individual Artist Fellowship, and the 2005 Louis Comfort Tiffany Foundation Fellowship.

Hurd's work is in the public collections of The Margulies Collection in Miami, FL,, The Frederick R Weisman Art Foundation Collection, and The Art, Design & Architecture Museum at the University of California, Santa Barbara.
