= Victor Caire =

French animator and filmmaker

- Born: 1993 (age 32–33); Aix-en-Provence, Bouches-du-Rhône, France
- Education: Supinfocom
- Occupations: director, producer, sound editor
- Years active: 2011 - present

Victor Caire is a French animator and filmmaker, best known for his animated short film, Garden Party (2017), for which he received critical acclaim and was co-nominated for Academy Award for Best Animated Short Film at 90th Academy Awards.

Victor Caire is co-founder of Illogic Studios.

== Filmography ==
- 2017: Garden Party (Short) (director, sound editor)

Year	Presenter/Festival	Award/Category	Status
2017	Academy Awards	Best Animated Short Film	Nominated
2017	Nashville Film Festival	"Grand Jury Price"	Won
2017	Clermont-Ferrand Film Festival	"Special Jury Mention"	Won
2017	SIGGRAPH	"Best Student Project"	Won
2017	Annecy International Animated Film Festival	"Best Student Film"	Nominated
