= Karen Carson =

American contemporary artist (born 1943)

Carson with her untitled Zipper work in 1972, black canvas, white duct tape, zippers, 120 x 72 inches.

Karen Carson (born 1943, Karen Hansen) is an American contemporary artist and a significant figure in the Los Angeles feminist art movement, primarily a painter, she employs a variety of media and styles that represent the emotional "turbulence of contemporary life" by finding visual parallels in both nature and culture. She lives and works in Los Angeles and Big Timber, Montana.

== Early life and education ==
Karen Carson was born in 1943 and grew up in the small college town of Corvallis, Oregon. Her father, a botanist, was a dean at Oregon State University; her mother, an artist who had also taught grade school, encouraged her four children to be creative and provided them with crayons, paper, and art supplies. As a shy child, Carson struggled with communicating in elementary school, found drawing to be a way to compensate for her inability to speak, and began thinking of herself as an artist.

In 1966, she received her Bachelor of Fine Arts (BFA) degree in painting and drawing from the University of Oregon. She relocated to California in 1969, where she briefly attended Scripps College in Claremont for a year before transferring to the University of California, Los Angeles (UCLA), where she earned her Master of Fine Arts (MFA) degree in 1971. While at UCLA, she studied with Richard Diebenkorn and William Brice. Becoming less dependent on her instructor's influence, Carson began to look outward, saw Minimalist art in New York City and L.A., and became interested in creating a response.

== Artistic practice ==
Untitled, Zipper, 1977, cotton duck and industrial zippers 95 1/2 × 72 in. Collection of Los Angeles County Museum of Art.

Upon graduating from UCLA in 1971, Carson debuted her feminist-inspired response to the predominance of hard-edge geometric forms in the male-dominated minimalist art movement by creating a fabric installation composed of soft, fluctuating geometric shapes pinned to the gallery wall. Not quite a painting and not quite a sculpture, they were sewn together with zippers that could zip up or unzip, allowing the viewer to interact with the work and alter its form. Carson was more interested in commenting and contrasting the hard, impenetrable materials like steel and wood, found in the extreme masculinity of minimalism, by creating her soft Zipper pieces, than in making the familiar feminist art of representational imagery, such as symbols, goddesses, and kitchen themes. Concerning the work, critic Dave Hickey writes, "They were investigating the parochial unctuousness of minimalism with a cosmopolitan irony. They were smart, funny, good-looking, and secretly serious, just like Karen."

The Zipper pieces signaled Carson's arrival as a new artistic voice in the L.A. community and how her work, like the Zipper series, would be defined by constant change. That was crucial because it allowed her to represent the "flux of visual reality" in both nature and culture and to subvert the male-dominated art movements that have defined art history. She is not an artist committed to a single style, but rather one who adapts her medium to the ideas she is exploring at the time.

== Selected works ==
Flowers of Fate, 1990–1991, acrylic, plexiglass, electronic candles, and clocks on wood, 196 x 144.25 x 4.5 inches (497.84 x 366.395 x 11.43 cm), part of the Timepieces series.

After the Zipper series (mentioned above), Carson found that painterly expressionism, with its turbulent style, could capture her perspective on the chaos of contemporary life in a series titled Abstractions, 1982–87.

By the close of the 1980s, Carson had successfully manipulated formal and structural elements in painting, particularly in the construction of spatial illusion through the use of color and geometry. She then shifted her approach, using wooden picture frame molding, fragments of mirrored plexiglass, colored plexiglass, and such unlikely collage elements as giant metal butterflies and elaborate Googie-era clocks. In doing so, she created a decorative yet ambivalent project, which she called Timepieces 1990–91, a conceptualization of historical movements, including Rococo, Cubism, Abstract Expressionism, Feminism, and Geometric Minimalism. This body of work is a collection of three-dimensional wall pieces that extend from the picture plane into the viewer's personal space.

Extending the picture plane further in It's A Small World at Rosamund Felsen Gallery in 1992, Carson installs nineteen painted found world globes of various sizes, suspending them in the gallery space to form a planetary system. Each world features a distinct theme she has painted on it. "Weaponry", which is a large sphere, covered with brightly painted missiles, guns, and explosives; Pollution is a tiny sphere with a tattooed style death's heads; "The Scream" replicates Munch's well-known painting in various sizes and hues. Surrounding the miniature solar system painted on the walls are angels engaged in sexual play, flying and twirling.

Breathe, 1994, silkscreen on paper, edition of 15, 33" x 26"

Pushing the conceptual boundaries of image/text juxtaposition, Carson's Life, Posters 1994, composed of large banner-like paintings on vinyl, combines a dramatic application of paint with the bold, exaggerated style of circus banner typography and the verbal acuity of advertising slogans. The 26 unstretched works on canvas are push-pinned to the gallery walls. Each work boldly asserts a two-word pairing that equates to a final thought. Spiritually inclined, they ultimately reflect the existential questions concerning life, its meaning, and the purpose of the human condition.

Putting Out Fires 2004 and Western Fires 2003 are series that explore the emotional, transcendental, and terrifying aspects of fire as a natural force. They include large-scale paintings on transparent silk with fabric dyes, acrylic, and metallic washes, as well as on layered, transparent Plexiglas light boxes. Focusing on conceptual issues in painting, psychological content, and outside forces that affect our community. These works allude to Victorian theatrics and 19th-century European Romantic landscape painting with a contemporary twist. Referencing popular culture and the canon of art history, Carson extends the discourse of postmodernism, energizing it with profound and playful content.

Rural Big Boys (2012–2016) is a series of large-scale, colorful, and highly expressive paintings that focus on agricultural equipment, including combines, tractors, and swathers. The unlikely subject comes from Carson's travels between her two homes, one in the urban setting (Los Angeles) and the other in the rural setting (Montana), where she experiences the activities of big farm equipment and its predominantly male (macho) culture. She presents these works in actual size, sensually painted as a humorous form of tool-porn (fetishism) for the guys.

== Collections ==
- The National Gallery of Art
- Museum of Contemporary Art, Los Angeles
- Los Angeles County Museum of Art
- Nora Eccles Harrison Museum of Art

== Awards ==
- 1981 Guggenheim Fellowship, Painting
- 1996 Research Grant, University of California, Santa Barbara.
- 1994 The J. Paul Getty Trust Fellowship administered by the California Community Foundation.
- 1985 National Endowment for the Arts Grant
- 1972 Mitchell Gallery, Southern Illinois University at Carbondale, and Mt. San Antonio College, Walnut, CA, Purchase Awards
- 1970 Western Washington College, and Long Beach Museum of Art, Purchase Awards
- 1969 Los Angeles Municipal Art Gallery, Young Talent Award
