= Garden Party (2017 film) =

2017 French animated short film

- Poster for the short film.
- Directed by: Théophile Dufresne; Florian Babikian; Gabriel Grapperon; Lucas Navarro; Vincent Bayoux; Victor Caire
- Produced by: Julien Deparis
- Music by: Romain Montiel; Steve Sidewell
- Production company: MoPA
- Distributed by: Miyu Distribution
- Release date: 28 January 2017 (Angers European First Film Festival)
- Running time: 7 minutes
- Country: France

Garden Party is a 2017 French animated short film directed by Illogic Collective, six French 3D artists during their studies at MoPA, animation school in France. This short film is their graduation film. The short has been presented and won awards in a number of festivals including the Clermont-Ferrand Film Festival, the SIGGRAPH, and the Nashville Film Festival where it won the Oscar Qualifying prize of Grand Jury Prize for best animation.

The short was nominated for the Academy Award for Best Animated Short Film at the 90th Academy Awards.

== Plot ==
In a deserted rich house, a couple of amphibians explore their surroundings. A emerald green frog swims through a murky swimming pool while being followed by a bigger toad. They eventually end up in a bedroom that has all its sheets scattered about. A small yellow frog tries and fails to catch a butterfly to eat, and a larger, fatter toad awakens in a kitchen full of rancid food. This does not stop it from dining on caviar and macarons. The yellow frog makes its way into the house through one of the numerous bullet holes in the glass windows. An open safe and a gun can be seen, implying that a violent gun fight occurred there.

As the night falls, the yellow frog finds the house's security room and begins accidentally turning on numerous switches, lighting up a painting that reveals the house's owner. Lights, music, and water effects turn on outside as more amphibians show up to enjoy their new paradise. As they do so, the body of the house's owner, clad solely in a bathrobe, floats to the top of the pool, having been pickled and swollen from resting at the bottom for so long. The amphibians pay no mind to him.

== Reception ==
=== Critical response ===
Garden Party has an approval rating of 100% on review aggregator website Rotten Tomatoes, based on 11 reviews, and an average rating of 9.00/10.

=== Awards ===
Since its launch, the film has received numerous awards, and selected in more than 180 festivals around the world.

Year	Presenter/Festival	Award/Category	Status
2017	Academy Awards	Best Animated Short Film	Nominated
2017	Nashville Film Festival	"Grand Jury Price"	Won
2017	Clermont-Ferrand Film Festival	"Special Jury Mention"	Won
2017	SIGGRAPH	"Best Student Project"	Won
2017	Annecy International Animated Film Festival	"Best Student Film"	Nominated

The short was part of the world touring screening The Animation Showcase 2017.
