= Jacci Den Hartog =

American sculptor (born 1962)

Jacci Den Hartog (born 1962) is an American sculptor and educator. She lives in Los Angeles.

== Early life and education ==
Jacci Den Hartog was born in 1962, in Pella, Iowa. Den Hartog received her BA in Fine Art at Linfeld College in 1984, and her MFA in sculpture at Claremont Graduate School in 1986. She then studied in San Jose, Costa Rica, at the Centro Cultural Costarricense Norteamericano.

== Career ==
Den Hartog has actively been exhibiting her sculptures since 1991. Her work has been included in exhibitions at Corcoran Gallery, Washington, D.C. in the “Painting Outside Painting: 44th Biennial Exhibition of Contemporary American Painting”; Nantes Museum, Nantes, France; San Francisco Art Institute; Kansas City Art Institute; Rosamund Felsen Gallery, Santa Monica; Christopher Grimes Gallery, Santa Monica; Contemporary Arts Center, Cincinnati; and The Suburban, Chicago as well as various European galleries in The Netherlands, Denmark and the Czech Republic.

Den Hartog received a Guggenheim Fellowship in the field of fine arts in 2012. She has received numerous other grants and awards, including the Pollock-Krasner Foundation Artists Grant, the Art Matters, Inc. Artists Grant; the City of Los Angeles Individual Artist Fellowship Award; California Community Foundation, Mid-Career Artist Grant; and the Purchase Award, Alberta DuPont Bonsal Foundation for the San Diego Museum of Contemporary Art.

In 2029, her work, Blood and Bones, was shown at Pasadena City College in Boone Family Art Gallery.

She is a professor at Otis College of Art and Design, and the program director of sculpture/new genres.

== Personal life ==
Den Hartog is married to artist Patrick Nickell, and they have a son together. The couple lives in the Eagle Rock area in Los Angeles, California.
