= Steven Hull =

American artist and curator

- Born: 1967 (age 58–59); Lakewood, California, United States
- Education: California Institute of the Arts
- Known for: Painting, drawing, sculpture, installation art, performance, public art
- Spouse: Tami Demaree
- Awards: Joan Mitchell Foundation, Louis Comfort Tiffany Foundation
- Website: Nothing Moments Press

Steven Hull, "Balcony," installation view, 2013.

Steven Hull (born 1967) is an American artist based in Los Angeles. His projects cross boundaries typically drawn between personal and collaborative work, disciplines like painting, sculpture and installation art, and artistic fields including writing, music, art, illustration, design and performance. In his personal work, he frequently creates immersive, multimedia tableaux and exhibitions that Los Angeles Times critic Christopher Knight described as "carnivalesque hybrids of painting and sculpture whose chief aim is to turn visions of the conventional world upside down." He often mixes opposing artistic styles (e.g., expressionist figurative drawing and geometric abstraction), irreverent conceptual strategies, and tones that range from playful to alienated or politically pointed. His collaborations include several artist-writer publications, including I’m Still In Love With You (1998–9), Song Poems (2000–1, which featured original music), and AB OVO (2005); he also co-founded the artist-run space La Cienegas Projects and established Nothing Moments Press, which produced and published "Nothing Moments" (2007), a set of 24 limited-edition book collaborations between writers, artists and designers. These projects have been presented at MOCA at the Pacific Design Center, Rosamund Felsen Gallery, and Festival Supreme, among other venues. Hull has received a Joan Mitchell Foundation award for painting (2009) and a Louis Comfort Tiffany Foundation award (2001). He is married to artist Tami Demaree.

== Early life and career ==
Hull was born in Lakewood, California in 1967. He became interested in art in his late teens after being involved in theater and before committing to college, took classes and worked as an assistant at University of Texas for artists Robert Colescott, Mary Lovelace O'Neill and Michael Tracy. After enrolling at California Institute of the Arts at age 24, he earned a BFA (1995) and MFA (1997), studying with Michael Asher and Thomas Lawson, respectively. The following year, he began exhibiting at Rosamund Felsen Gallery in Santa Monica, a relationship that continued until 2016; he was also featured in early solo shows at Galerie Rolf Ricke (Germany, 2002) and Angstrom Gallery curated by David Quadrini (Dallas, 2002–6) and group shows at Los Angeles Contemporary Exhibitions (LACE), Los Angeles Municipal Gallery, Neues Museum Nürnberg (Germany), and San Diego Museum of Art.

Steven Hull, Stack Painting (not titled), acrylic on canvas with artificial flowers, 1999. Neues Museum, Nuremberg, Germany.

== Personal work ==
Hull's work often explores the ways that disciplines interact, overlap and create meaning through hybrid projects—mixed-media installations that collapse disparate styles and disciplines into experiential wholes and challenge preconceived ideas about art and its functioning. His paintings and drawings oscillate between edgy, expressionist figurative works (involving carnival, erotic, sea or political themes) and geometric or lyrical abstraction; he often juxtaposes them with found objects and handmade, theatrical assemblage sculptures in exhibitions that may also include sound and motion.

=== Early painting and drawing ===
Hull gained early recognition for his paintings and drawings, with publications such as Artforum and LA Weekly placing him among a younger generation of Los Angeles painters whose work nonchalantly and self-consciously disrupted modernist paradigms such as intentionality, the expressive "truth" of gesture, and rigid distinctions between abstraction and figuration. In personal and curatorial work (e.g., the exhibitions "Landscape Memories", 1999; "Are 'Friends' Electric?" 2001; and "Painful Giggles", 2004, which included works made with his children), Hull pursued irreverent conceptual and presentation strategies (e.g., multiple panels, stacked canvasses) that complicated or subverted traditional genres and gallery practices.

Critics characterize his painting of this time as challenging and sometimes confrontational in its mix of visual acumen, dissonant styles, and aggressive gesture and color. He coupled chaotic, fluorescent stripe paintings that were likened to the work of Ed Moses with others in which he applied wads of artificial flowers; the results left reviewers to debate the intentions of work that sometimes convincingly riffed on art-historical abstraction and other times consciously pushed the limits of such precedents. Christopher Knight described this work as "big, jarring field-painting" in which plastic flowers emerged from "the synthetic clash between loosely painted plaids and oozing puddles of toxic-looking color."

Steven Hull, Is the Moon Bright Enough?, acrylic on canvas (framed), 95.5" x 10' 10.75", 2015.

=== Recent exhibitions and installations ===
Hull's later art has focused on immersive mixed-media tableaux and installations in solo exhibitions at Rosamund Felsen (2011–6) and Meliketsian Briggs (2017–9) that critics described as "phantasmagorical," "carnivalesque" and "burlesque-like." His 2011 show combined black-and-white, patterned figurative sculpture, pulsating geometric canvases, small figurative paintings (some placed unexpectedly in the center of the geometric works), and tiny trains running across the floor; KCRW's Edward Goldman likened the experience to stepping onto a crowded stage of "eye-popping props" with "fascinating chaos" unraveling behind the curtain.

In the show "Balcony" (2013), Hull brought vintage marionettes and masks into his mix in ten theatrical installations that included sculpture, figurative and diverse abstract paintings, sound and motion. Its centerpiece was Engine Room, a sprawling assemblage of roughly twenty Day-Glo colored paintings stacked and leaning against the wall with flat-black, furniture-like props suggesting Louise Nevelson or Tony Smith sculptures in the foreground. In a review, Christopher Knight wrote, "The cacophony of opposing artistic styles, from Expressionist vitality to Constructivist logic and Dada subversion, gives Hull’s revelry its punch. Part savvy satire, part innocent playroom, his tableaux perform an irreverent burlesque."

Hull's exhibition "Never Again Sharpen Your Teeth On the Rope That Holds You So Safely to Shore" (2016) combined carnival and nautical motifs, contrasting a sense of adventure and whimsy with themes of melancholy, decadence, alienation and militarism. He offered the former with Wow! Wow! Wow! Wow! Wow! Wow! Unbelievable! (2015–6), a glass vitrine with a childlike orange sailboat perched on rough-cut black and white waves and beckoned by two incongruous globular pink breasts. In paintings and oil-and-ink transfer works, however, the whimsical (including strands of nautical lights and calliope music) gave way to darker erotic or ominous subjects: masked and obscured figures rendered with graphic, Picasso-like cubist angles and lurid colors, which recalled the work of German expressionists Max Beckmann and Otto Dix (e.g., the moody, blue-dominated Is the Moon Bright Enough?, which features three abject, naked figures in a small dinghy).

Steven Hull, If Jesus Gives Us Everything We Want, We’ll Love Him (detail), mixed media assemblage with sound, 8' x 4.5' x 12', 2017.

In subsequent work, Hull extended his socio-political references to explore race, financial inequality and oppression. Christopher Knight described the centerpiece of his 2017 show, If Jesus Gives Us Everything We Want, We’ll Love Him, as a "sad, sinister, pitch-perfect lament for our troubled time" that "puts white nationalism and its perversion of authentic Christian values on sordid display." It featured a dilapidated 1951 Electric Shopper motorized scooter that towed an assemblage model battleship and was capped with an electric megaphone blaring a slowed-down fire-and-brimstone sermon; driven by a white-robed Klansman and a blond passenger, the piece was likened to Edward Kienholz sculptures, Philip Guston paintings, and Thomas Nast editorial cartoons. Hull paired it with large, brushy paintings emblematic of 1950s Greenbergian abstraction in the show. His three-part exhibition, "Our Little Chapel by the Lake: The Transformation of Jesus Christ" (2019), featured abstract and figurative paintings, a kinetic sculpture, and a record release and performance exploring characteristic nautical, carnivalesque and political themes.

== Collaborative projects ==
In addition to curating exhibitions, Hull has undertaken large-scale, relay-style collaborative projects involving the production and exchange of text, images and music among artists from different disciplines, beginning in graduate school. In his first, Blind Date (1997), he invited 31 visual artists to each create an artwork, then randomly assigned those works to writers to each produce a piece of writing in response. I’m Still In Love With You (1998–9) featured 46 visual artists and 29 writers responding to the 1972, same-titled album by soul musician Al Green.

For Song Poems (2000–01), Hull commissioned poems from 40 writers (among them, Rick Moody, Darcey Steinke and Lynne Tillman), which he turned over to musicians to use as lyrics for original songs that were given to artists, who created videos and album covers for them. The project yielded a 3-CD catalogue of 43 lyrics and songs, album art and posters, as well as performances and exhibitions at Cohan Leslie and Browne (New York), Angstrom Gallery and Rosamund Felsen; critic Martha Schwendener wrote that "the results have a quirkiness that functions marvelously in a gallery," pushing boundaries by bringing music into the art world and showing "the crucial role of art and design in marketing music."

=== Nothing Moments Press ===
In 2005, Hull established Nothing Moments Press as an outlet to produce and publish collaborative projects. Its first major project was AB OVO (2005), for which Hull solicited 19 artists (among them, Mike Kelley, Martha Rosler and Bruce Yonemoto) to take the Minnesota Multiphasic Personality Inventory-2TM, a personality test used in the U.S. legal system to identify and evaluate psychological disorders. Each test, customized for child custody cases, produced a personality profile, which Hull anonymously and randomly assigned to writers to base a children’s story on; the stories were then given to figurative artists, who developed illustrations for the stories. Artforum critic Glen Helfand called the resulting exhibition and catalogue "high-concept, multiple-phase curating at its best … a memorable Freudian brew of nightmares and curdled milk."

In 2008, the press came out with "Nothing Moments Projects": 24 limited edition books and over 400 original drawings by nearly one hundred artists, writers and designers, which were produced by Hull, Tami Demaree, Annie Buckley and Jon Sueda. They began by requesting submissions of original novels, novellas and short stories. After narrowing to 24 works (by writers such as Aimee Bender, Ben Ehrenreich, Rachel Kushner, and Tom McCarthy), they turned them over to artists (e.g., Derek Boshier, Andrea Bowers, Glenn Ligon) for illustrations, and then to designers (e.g., Gail Swanlund) to create the finished books. The project was featured in exhibitions in Los Angeles, San Francisco, Dallas and Chicago.

=== Additional public collaborations ===
In 2009, Hull and Amy Thoner co-founded Las Cienegas Projects, an artist-run curatorial project and gallery space in Los Angeles, which presented over sixty collaborative and project-based artworks by local and international emerging and established artists. Its projects from 2009 to 2011 are documented in a catalog, Las Cienegas Projects: Time Runs Out (2015).

In 2014, Hull was invited to develop the visual environment for the second Festival Supreme, a music and comedy event in Los Angeles organized by Tenacious D (Jack Black and Kyle Gass). He produced an enormous art theme park called Circus of Death, which featured two prop-festooned trains, a haunted church/bouncy house by Jim Shaw, monster costumes by Marnie Weber, puppets and figurative sculptures with sound, videos, and performances by himself and others. Hull organized a multimedia environment for "Glow," a one-night interactive art festival in Santa Monica in 2013; it featured a puppet show, sculpture by Hull and Demaree, and sounds by Gibby Haynes and music by Petra Haden, Tanya Haden and Anna Huff, which were captured on the album A Puppet Show.

In 2017, he participated in the "Murals of La Jolla" public art project with Man, Myths and Magic, a vibrant, billboard-sized reproduction of a five-by-seven-inch drawing of his, which combined abstract, referential and fantastical qualities in its depiction of a humanoid figures emerging from a surreal landscape.
