= Negative Space (film) =

- Directed by: Ru Kuwahata; Max Porter
- Produced by: Edwina Liard; Nidia Santiago
- Cinematography: Nadine Buss; Simon Gesrel
- Edited by: Max Porter
- Music by: Bram Meindersma
- Production company: Tiny Inventions
- Release date: June 13, 2017 (France)
- Running time: 5 minutes
- Country: France

Negative Space is a 2017 French stop motion animated short film by Max Porter and Ru Kuwahata. It was nominated for the Academy Award for Best Animated Short Film at the 90th Academy Awards. It is based on a poem by Ron Koertge.

The animated short film is available to watch on the directors' official Vimeo channel.

== Plot ==
A man narrates of his relationship with his father, a traveling salesman.

The narrator explains that he and his father bond over packing luggage, unique ways of arranging clothes, shoes, and accessories, and filling up all the space in the suitcase; the narrator's mother attempts to pack her husband's things but lacks the skills. By the time the narrator turns 12, he packs his father's suitcase just the way the salesman wants it; every time the narrator's father sees how everything is in place, he texts his son with a single word, "Perfect."

Now an adult, the narrator continues packing his things the same way his father does. The narrator's father dies and when he looks into the casket, he thinks his father would have complained of the "wasted space" around his corpse.

== Reception ==
On review aggregator website Rotten Tomatoes, the film has an approval rating of 100% based on 15 reviews, and an average rating of 8.40/10.

== Accolades ==
- Academy Award for Best Animated Short Film nomination (2017)
- Best Animated Short: Richmond International Film & Music Festival (2018)
