= Ru Kuwahata =

Japanese animator and filmmaker

- Education: Parsons The New School for Design (BFA); Netherlands Institute for Animated Film
- Occupations: Director, producer, writer, editor, visual effects supervisor
- Years active: 2003–present
- Website: www.tinyinventions.com

Ru Kuwahata is a Japanese animator and filmmaker, best known for her stop-motion film, Negative Space for which she received critical acclaim and was co-nominated for an Academy Award nomination for Academy Award for Best Animated Short Film with co-director and husband Max Porter.

== Filmography ==
- 2017: Negative Space (Short)
- 2016: Perfect Houseguest (Short)
- 2014: Between Times (Short)
- 2010: Something Left, Something Taken (Short)

== Awards and nominations ==
- Nominated: Academy Award for Best Animated Short Film
