= Heaven Is a Traffic Jam on the 405 =

2016 documentary film by Frank Stiefel

- Film poster
- Directed by: Frank Stiefel
- Starring: Mindy Alper
- Distributed by: IndieWire (online); Grasshopper Film (US)
- Release date: October 2016 (Austin Film Festival)
- Running time: 40 minutes
- Country: United States
- Language: English

Heaven Is a Traffic Jam on the 405 is a 2016 American documentary film directed by Frank Stiefel. Its subject is the artist Mindy Alper. The film earned a nomination for Best Short from the IDA Awards, and won both audience and jury awards at both the Full Frame Film Festival and the Austin Film Festival. It won the Oscar for Best Documentary Short Subject at the 90th Academy Awards.

== Overview ==
Heaven Is a Traffic Jam on the 405 is a film created from more than 20 hours of interviews between the film's subject, Mindy Alper, and director Frank Stiefel. Alper is a visual artist who channels her inner anxiety, depression, trauma and other demons into vivid drawings and papier-mâché sculptures.

The title comes from Alper, who says that one of the only situations in which she feels at home besides art is sitting in bumper-to-bumper traffic.
