= Watu Wote =

- Directed by: Katja Benrath
- Written by: Julia Drache
- Produced by: Tobias Rosen
- Cinematography: Felix Striegel
- Edited by: Julia Drache
- Music by: Florian Hirschmann; Elisabeth Kaplan
- Production company: Hamburg Media School
- Release date: 2017
- Running time: 22 minutes
- Countries: Germany; Kenya
- Languages: Swahili; Somali

Watu Wote: All of Us, or simply Watu Wote is a 2017 Kenyan-German, live-action short film directed by Katja Benrath, as her graduation project at Hamburg Media School. The film is based on a December 2015 bus attack by Al-Shabaab in Mandera, Kenya. The film received critical acclaim, winning a Student Academy Award for Narrative, and received an Academy Award nomination for Academy Award for Best Live Action Short Film at the 90th Academy Awards. Production faced difficulties when the crew's camera was stolen before filming had begun.

== Plot ==
Jua, a Christian living in Kenya, boards a chartered bus to visit a relative and is uncomfortable being surrounded by Muslim passengers. The bus is stopped by the violent terrorist group Al-Shabaab, whose members demand that the Muslims identify the Christian passengers.

== Cast ==
- Barkhad Abdirahman as Abdirashid Adan
- Faysal Ahmed as Hassan Yaqub Ali (Al-Shabaab Leader)
- Mahad Ahmed as Passenger
- Abdiwali Farrah as Salah Farah
- Charles Karumi as Issa Osman
- Alex Khayo as GSU officer
- Gerald Langiri as GSU officer
- Justin Mirichii as James Ouma
- Saada Mohammed as Astuhr
- Douglas Muigai as GSU officer
- Adelyne Wairimu as Jua

== Reception ==
=== Critical reception ===
On review aggregator website Rotten Tomatoes, the film holds an approval rating of 100% based on 9 reviews, with an average rating of 8.2/10.

=== Awards and nominations ===
- Winner: (Gold Plaque) Student Academy Award for Best International Film School - Narrative
- Nominated for Best Live Action Short Film at the 90th Academy Awards.
