= Tobias Rosen =

German film producer

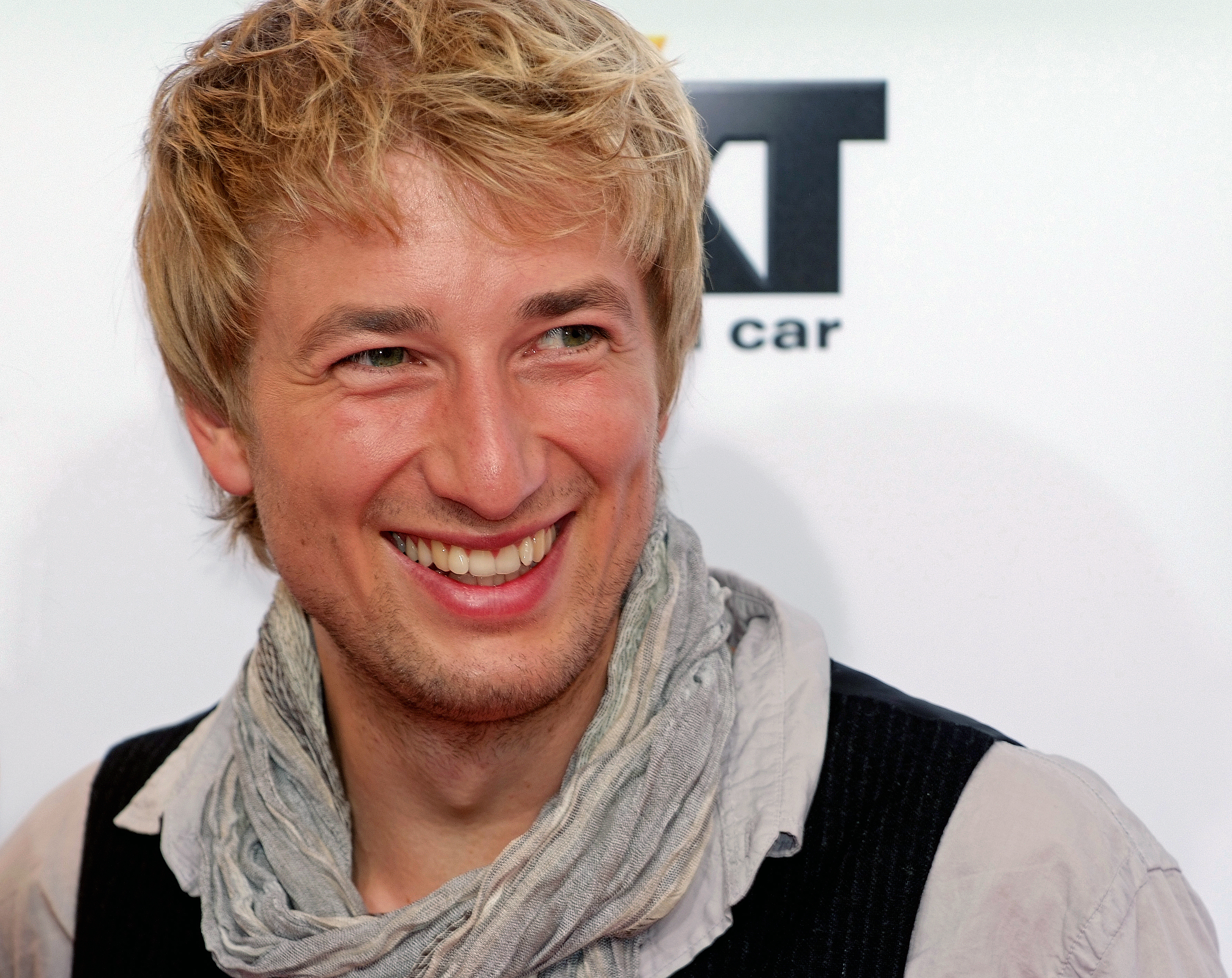
- Rosen in 2012
- Born: September 28, 1983 (age 41); Nuremberg, Germany
- Occupation: Producer
- Years active: 2013–present

Tobias Rosen is a German film producer, best known for his film, Watu Wote/All of Us for which he received critical acclaim and received an Academy Award nomination for Academy Award for Best Live Action Short Film.

== Awards and nominations ==
- Nominated: Academy Award for Best Live Action Short Film
