= Charles Arnoldi =

American painter (born 1946)

- Born: April 10, 1946 (age 80); Dayton, Ohio, U.S.
- Known for: Painting, sculpture, printmaking
- Website: charlesarnoldistudio.com

Charles Arthur Arnoldi (born April 10, 1946) is an American painter, sculptor and printmaker.

== Life and work ==
Arnoldi was awarded a Guggenheim Fellowship in 1977. for Fine Arts. That same year, he had his first stick sculpture cast in bronze.

In the 1990s, Arnoldi's output changed radically. He began producing abstract paintings on canvas, first black and white, and later brightly colored.

== Collections ==
In 2024, collections holding examples of his work included:

- Art Institute of Chicago, Chicago: 2 paintings
- Metropolitan Museum of Art, New York: 1 work
- Museum of Modern Art, New York: 1 painting
- Whitney Museum, New York: 1 work
