= Patrick Nickell =

American sculptor and visual artist

- Born: 1960 (age 65–66); Van Nuys
- Education: Linfield College (BA); Claremont Graduate University (MFA)
- Occupations: Visual artist; sculptor
- Years active: 1988–present
- Spouse: Jacci Den Hartog

Patrick Nickell (born 1960) is an American sculptor and visual artist. He has had exhibitions at various universities and galleries, including the one-artist show "Built For Speed, A Sculpture Survey," and currently teaches at Woodbury University as a professor. He has been described as "making messy, minimal sculptures from found and discarded materials such as cardboard, twine, plywood and scrap metal."

== Career ==
=== Art and Exhibits ===
His first group exhibition was at the Los Angeles Contemporary Exhibitions in 1988. Nickell's first solo exhibition, Built for Speed, was at the Sue Spaid Gallery in 1990, with a one-artist show, “Patrick Nickell: Built For Speed, A Sculpture Survey,” being at Luckman Fine Arts Gallery, California State University, Los Angeles. This show then traveled to the Harrison Museum, Utah State University, Logan and the University of Texas, San Antonio. In a 1994 review of a major solo exhibition at Kohn Turner Gallery, Carmine Lannaconne wrote in Art Issues, "Other artists have made the funky and the junky into the chic and elegant, but what distinguishes Nickell is the quixotic sincerity he brings to the endeavor."

With the exhibitions, he, alongside several other artists, were noticed for the use of sculpting to make "[t]hree-dimensional drawings in [...] space". In 2014, Nickell was awarded a John Simon Guggenheim Memorial Foundation Fellowship.

His work is displayed in several different permanent collections which are displayed at the Museum of Contemporary Art, Los Angeles, Luckman Fine Arts Gallery at California State University, Los Angeles, Laguna Beach Museum of Art, Nora Eccles Harrison Museum of Art at Utah State University, Santa Barbara Museum of Art, Los Angeles County Museum of Art, and the Berkeley Art Museum at the University of California.

=== Teaching ===
Nickell has also taught in various colleges and universities, including the Otis College of Art and Design, California State University, Los Angeles, and Woodbury University, the latter of which he directs the University's Nan Rae Gallery.

== Personal life ==
Nickell received his Bachelor of Arts from Linfield College in 1983, and his Master of Fine Arts from Claremont Graduate University in 1985.

Nickell is married to artist Jacci Den Hartog, and they have a son together. They had first moved in together after graduate school and created a studio in Downtown Los Angeles. The couple currently lives in the Eagle Rock area in Los Angeles, California.
