= Mark Mitten =

American film producer

- Born: Akron, Ohio
- Occupation(s): Producer, director and writer

Mark Mitten is an Academy Award-nominated and Emmy Award-winning film producer. He is best known for Abacus: Small Enough to Jail nominated for the Academy Award for Best Documentary Feature and Best Business Documentary at the News and Documentary Emmy Awards.

His films have appeared in every major film festival including Sundance, the Cannes Film Festival, the Venice International Film Festival, the Berlin International Film Festival, the Toronto International Film Festival and Telluride Film Festival among others.

Mark is also the founder and managing partner of Mitten a firm that creates content that inspires while generating social impact.

Before producing films, he was the Chief Brand Officer for the Chicago bid for the 2016 Summer Olympics. He began his career working at J. Walter Thompson advertising before founding Envision, a brand strategy company. He and his partners sold it to McKinsey & Company, their first acquisition in 10 years, where he became a direct elect partner and helped lead their brand strategy and marketing practices.

== Filmography ==
- 2004-2005: The Apprentice (TV Series) (task producer - 33 episodes)
- 2010: Making Big Plans: The Story of Chicago's Olympic Dream (TV Movie documentary) (producer)
- 2012: The Most American City (Video short) (producer)
- 2014: Life Itself (Documentary) (executive producer)
- 2016: Abacus: Small Enough to Jail (Documentary) (producer)
- 2017: Frontline (TV Series documentary) (producer - 1 episode)
- 2019: Ringside (Documentary) ( executive producer)
- 2019: White Eye (Feature short) (executive producer)
- 2020: Finding Yingying (Documentary) (executive producer)
- 2021: Miracle on 19th Street (Documentary Short) (director/producer)
- 2021: The Lost Leonardo (Documentary) (executive producer)
- 2022: Surf Nation (Documentary) (executive producer)
- 2023 A Compassionate Spy (Documentary) (producer)

== Externals ==
- Mark Mitten at IMDb
- Mitten Media (external site)
