= Frank Stiefel =

American filmmaker and photographer

- Education: City College of New York
- Occupations: Director, screenwriter, editor, actor, producer, photographer
- Years active: 1970–present
- Website: www.frankstiefel.com

Frank Stiefel is an American filmmaker and photographer. His film Heaven Is a Traffic Jam on the 405 won the Oscar for Best Documentary Short Subject at the 90th Academy Awards.

== Career ==
Stiefel was born to a Jewish family in New York City and attended The City College of New York. Stieifel spent most of his career as an executive in the commercial production industry. As an executive producer at Stiefel & Company (and later at RadicalMedia), Stiefel oversaw the production of thousands of TV commercials.

He made his directorial debut in 2009 with the movie Ingelore, a short film about his mother, Ingelore Herz Honigstein, a deaf Holocaust survivor. The documentary, which he dedicated to his mother, tells the story of how she survived being raped by two Nazis and eventually managed to flee to the United States. The film premiered at the Berlin Film Festival in 2010 and aired on HBO in 2011. At that point, Stiefel retired to concentrate on non-fiction filmmaking full-time.

Heaven is a Traffic Jam on the 405, his second film, won both the 2017 Full Frame Audience Award & Full Frame Jury Award for Best Short. It was nominated for an Academy Award for Best Documentary Short Subject soon after Stiefel's 70th birthday. The film won the Oscar for Best Documentary Short Subject at the 90th Academy Awards.

== Personal life ==
Frank Stiefel is married to artist BJ Dockweiler.

== Filmography ==
Producer

- 2017: Bose Angelo' (Short) (executive producer) (completed)
- 2016: Heaven is a Traffic Jam on the 405' (Documentary short) (producer)
- 2009: Ingelore' (Documentary short) (producer)
- 2008: Two Roads to the Taupo 1000' (TV Movie documentary) (executive producer)
- 2007: Two Roads to Baja' (TV Movie documentary) (executive producer)
- 2002: A Stoner's Life' (Short) (producer)
- 1999: Two Weddings' (Documentary short) (executive producer)

Director

- 2016: Heaven is a Traffic Jam on the 405' (Documentary short)
- 2009: Ingelore' (Documentary short)

Cinematographer

- 2016: Heaven is a Traffic Jam on the 405' (Documentary short)

Other

- 2009: Ingelore' (Documentary short) (camera operator)
- 1980: Mr. & Mrs. Dracula' (TV Series) (assistant to the producer - 1 episode)
- 2011: Stage 5' (TV Series, himself)
