= Renee Petropoulos =

American contemporary artist and educator (born 1954)

Renée Petropoulos (born 1954), is an American contemporary artist, and educator. She lives in the Venice neighborhood of Los Angeles, California.

== Early life and education ==
Petropoulos was born in 1954, in Los Angeles, California; to immigrant parents from Greece and Germany. Her parents divorced when she was age 3, and she was raised by her mother and her maternal grandparents.

She received a Bachelors of Art (BA) degree in art history in 1974, and then a Masters of Art (MA) degree in photography and video in 1977, from the University of California, Los Angeles (UCLA).

Petropoulos is a professor at Otis College of Art and Design in the graduate fine arts, graduate public practice, and graduate graphic design departments.

== Artistic practice ==
The art of Los Angeles-based artist Renée Petropoulos often explores the complex relationship between public and private space, geography, and language, frequently integrating cultural symbols and sound. Her work includes painting, sculpture, public art, and performance. Often, Petropoulos examines who constitutes the "public" and how public spaces are utilized. She has incorporated fragments of private conversations into very public places, like a transit station, creating an intimate layer within a civic area. Using contrasting symbolic elements to create tension. Petropoulos may place a mandala, a symbol of spiritual significance, within a chaotic arrangement of varying logos to question the nature of order and its relationship to violence.

== Public art ==
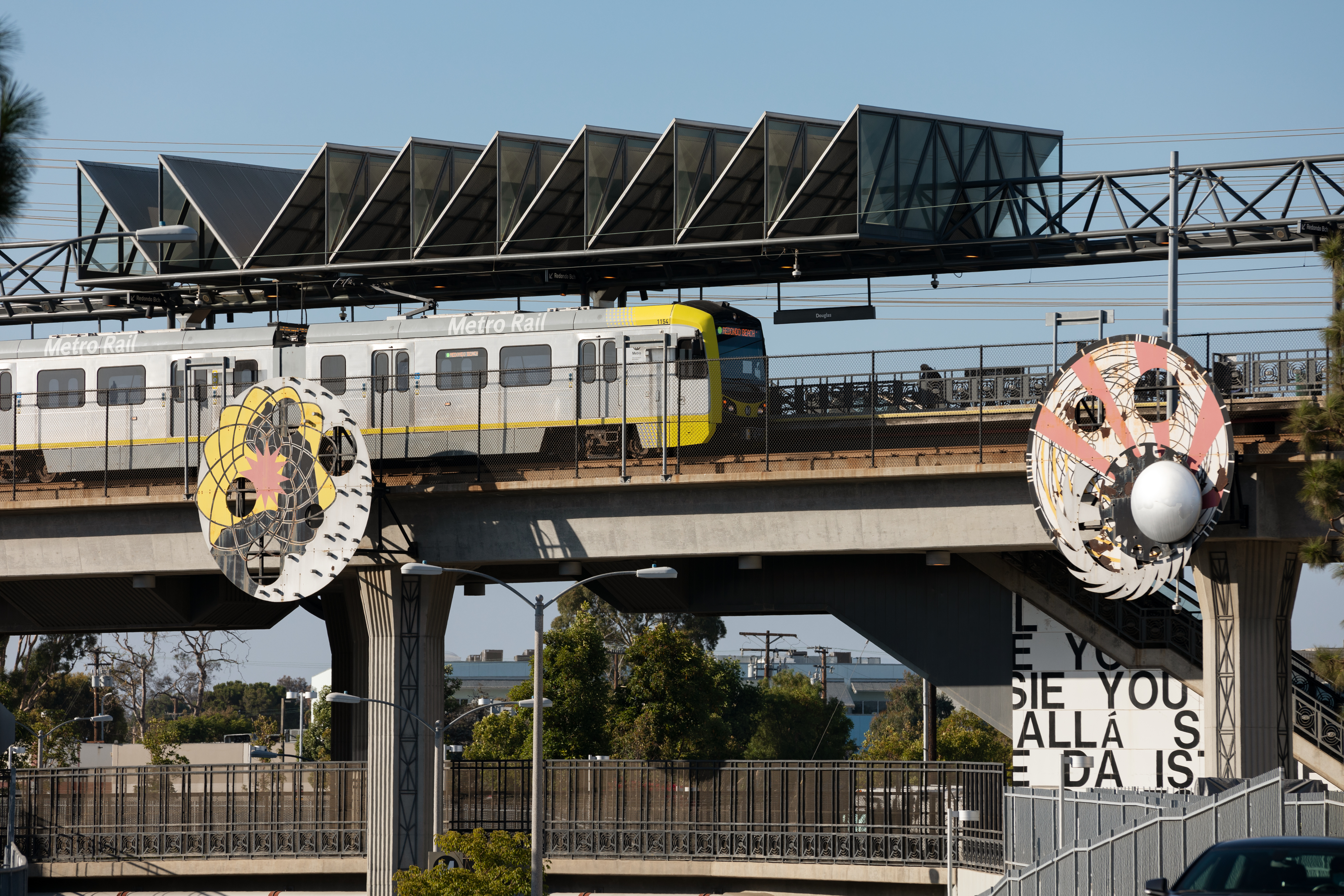
K Line train at Douglas station

Petropoulos has made public artwork in Los Angeles and elsewhere. Among her public art commissions are a large painted ceiling at the downtown Los Angeles Public Library, a series of sculptures in Culver City, a collaborative project with Roger White and Daniel Joseph Martinez for the Municipal Services Building in downtown Philadelphia, and medallions for the guideway Douglas St Rosecrans Ave. Station of the Metro Green Line in El Segundo, California.

== List of exhibitions ==
- "Proposal for a Pavilion", 2014. Los Angeles Museum of Art, Los Angeles, California
- "Freeway Studies #1: This Side of the 405," 2013, Ben Maltz Gallery at Otis College of Art and Design, Los Angeles, California
- "Figures and Grounds: Approaches to Abstraction," 2012, Arts Club of Chicago, Chicago, Illinois
- "Telephone," 2011, Torrance Art Museum, Torrance, California
- "Homage", 2009, solo exhibition at Rosamund Felsen Gallery, Santa Monica, California
- "(dis)concert", 2008, Steve Turner Contemporary, Los Angeles, California
- "LA - A Select Survey of Art from Los Angeles," 2008, Center for Contemporary Art Sacramento, Sacramento, California
- "LACE Annual Benefit", 2007, Los Angeles Contemporary Exhibitions, Los Angeles, California
- "Social Arrangements" 2007, solo exhibition at Rosamund Felsen Gallery, Santa Monica, California
- "Sugartown," 2005, Elizabeth Dee Gallery, New York City, New York
- "100 Artists See God," 2005, Virginia Museum of Contemporary Art (MOCA), Virginia Beach, Virginia
- "100 Artists See God", 2004, Institute of Contemporary Arts, London, England
- "100 Artists See God", 2004, Contemporary Jewish Museum, San Francisco, California
- "Trespassing: Houses X Artists", 2004, Palm Springs Art Museum, Palm Springs, California
- "Trespassing: Houses X Artists", 2004, the Art Museum of the University of Houston, Houston, Texas
- "Trespassing: Houses X Artists", 2003, University of South Florida Contemporary Art Museum, Tampa, Florida
- "Structures of Knowledge," 2001, RAID Projects, Los Angeles, California,
- "Urban Hymns," 2000, the Luckman Fine Arts Complex, Los Angeles, California,
