= Max Porter (animator) =

American animator and filmmaker (born 1981)

- Born: 1981 (age 44–45); New York
- Education: Rhode Island School of Design (BFA); Netherlands Institute for Animated Film
- Occupations: Director, producer, writer, editor, visual effects supervisor
- Years active: 2003–present
- Website: www.tinyinventions.com

Max Porter (born 1981) is an American animator and filmmaker, best known for his stop-motion film, Negative Space for which he received critical acclaim and was co-nominated for an Academy Award nomination for Academy Award for Best Animated Short Film with co-director and wife Ru Kuwahata. He is a faculty member at the Rhode Island School of Design.

== Filmography ==
- 2017: Negative Space (Short)
- 2016: Perfect Houseguest (Short)
- 2014: Between Times (Short)
- 2010: Something Left, Something Taken (Short)

== Awards and nominations ==
- Nominated: Academy Award for Best Animated Short Film
