= Katja Benrath =

German actress (born 1979)

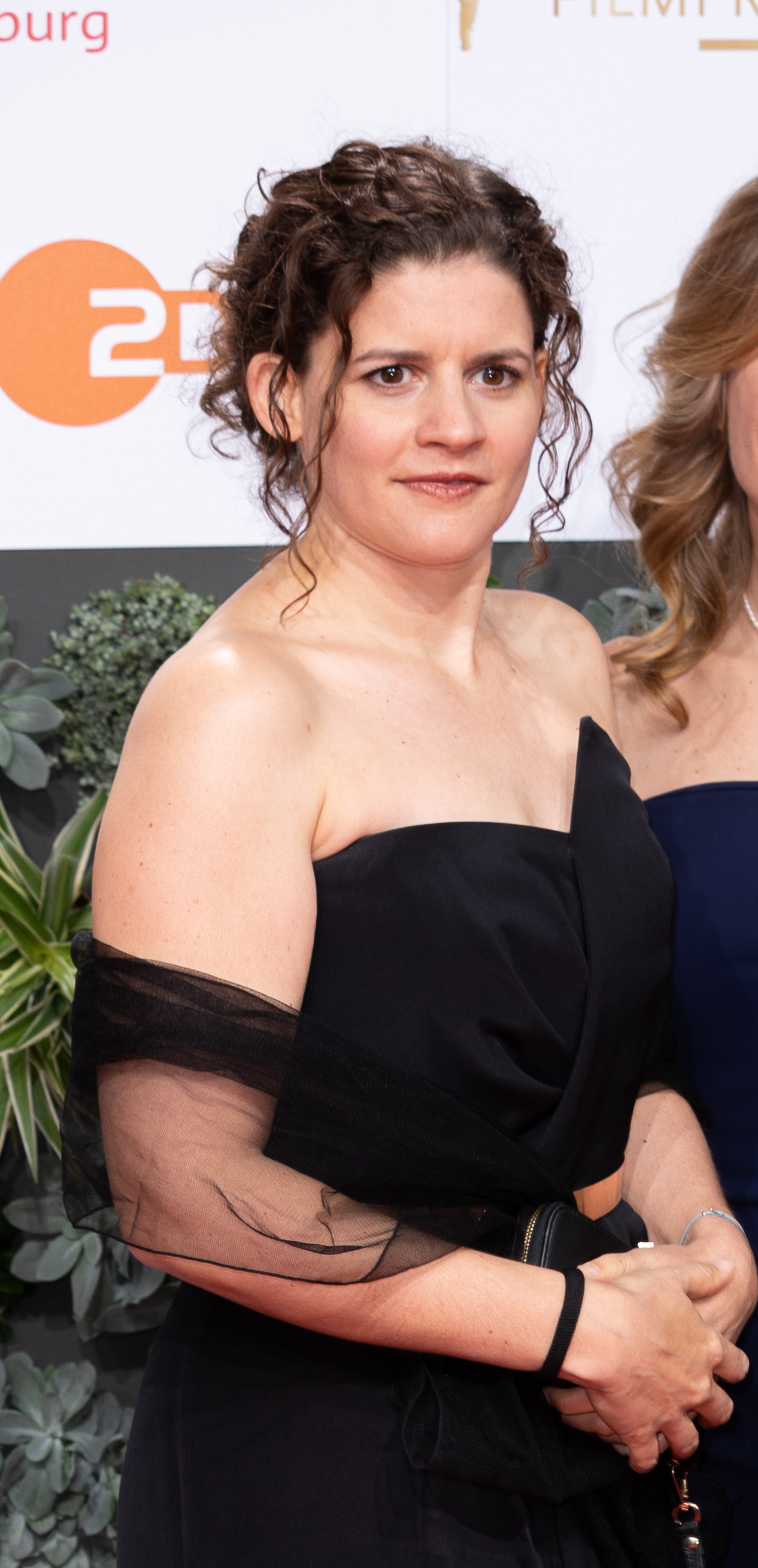
- Katja Benrath in 2019.
- Born: 1 September 1979 (age 45); Erbach im Odenwald, Germany
- Occupation(s): Actress, director, producer and writer
- Years active: 2000–present
- Website: www.katjabenrath.com

Katja Benrath (born September 1, 1979 in Erbach im Odenwald, Germany) is a German actress and filmmaker, best known for her film, Watu Wote/All of Us for which she received critical acclaim and was winner at Student Academy Award, and received an Academy Award nomination for Academy Award for Best Live Action Short Film. She also won on 2019 the Giffoni film festival in the 6+ session.

== Filmography ==
Actress

- 2005–2006: Tom Turbo (TV series), as Zara Zisch
- 2006: Karo und der liebe Gott, as Polizistin
- 2009: Puppenspiel (Short), as Emma
- 2012: Where the Wild Roses Grow (Short), as Yasmina
- 2013: Im Himmel kotzt man nicht (Short), as Karin
- 2013: Ortis in Wonderland (Short), as Bad Queen

Director

- 2009: Puppenspiel (Short)
- 2013: Im Himmel kotzt man nicht (Short)
- 2016: Wo warst du (Short)
- 2016: Tilda (Short)
- 2016: Schwimmstunde (Short)
- 2017: Watu Wote (Short)
- 2019: Rocca verändert die Welt
- 2020: Life is not a kindergarten

== Awards and nominations ==
- Nominated: Academy Award for Best Live Action Short Film
- Winner: (Gold Plaque) Student Academy Award for Best International Film School - Narrative
