= Power 100 =

The Hollywood Reporter's Power 100 (also known as Women in Entertainment Power 100) list, published annually since 1992, is a ranking of the 100 most powerful women in entertainment—film and television executives, agents, producers and occasionally performers. The list is made public in December during the magazine's yearly Women in Entertainment Breakfast. The factors on which the ranking is based have varied in the past. For example, the 2009 Power 100 took into account: achievements (box office, television ratings or dollars generated); overall authority within her company and Hollywood; greenlight power (ability to get a project made); and her standing within the industry.

Despite the existence of similar rankings, such as Forbes's Celebrity 100 and Vanity Fair's New Establishment issue, the competition surrounding the Power 100 has remained substantial, particularly since Janice Min became chief creative officer at The Hollywood Reporter in 2010. In 2014, The New York Times called the Power 100 "one of the most fearsome competitions in show business," akin to the campaigns preceding the Academy Awards, adding that "for certain executives, agents and producers, this has become a blood sport."

Anne Sweeney, then co-chairman of Disney Media Networks, was named the most powerful woman in entertainment eight times between 2004 and 2013. Oprah Winfrey, chairman of Harpo Inc., and Amy Pascal, co-chairman of Sony Pictures Entertainment, were ranked in first place in 2008 and 2009 respectively. In 2014, NBCUniversal chairman Bonnie Hammer superseded Sweeney as the entertainment industry's most powerful woman.

== Top Tens of the Power 100 ==
| Year | No. | Recipient | Career |
|---|---|---|---|
| 2010 | 1 | Anne Sweeney | Co-chairman of Disney Media Networks; president of Disney-ABC Television Group |
| 2010 | 2 | Amy Pascal | Co-chairman of Sony Pictures Entertainment |
| 2010 | 3 | Bonnie Hammer | President of NBCUniversal Cable |
| 2010 | 4 | Oprah Winfrey | Chairman of Harpo Inc. |
| 2010 | 5 | Abbe Raven | President and CEO of A&E Television Networks |
| 2010 | 6 | Stacey Snider | Co-chairman and CEO of DreamWorks |
| 2010 | 7 | Donna Langley | Co-chairman of Universal Pictures |
| 2010 | 8 | Nina Tassler | President of CBS |
| 2010 | 9 | Dana Walden | Chairman of 20th Century Fox Television |
| 2010 | 10 | Judy McGrath | Chairman of MTV Networks |

| Year | No. | Recipient | Career |
|---|---|---|---|
| 2011 | 1 | Anne Sweeney | Co-chairman of Disney Media Networks; president of Disney-ABC Television Group |
| 2011 | 2 | Amy Pascal | Co-chairman of Sony Pictures Entertainment |
| 2011 | 3 | Bonnie Hammer | Chairman of NBCUniversal Cable |
| 2011 | 4 | Abbe Raven | President and CEO of A&E Television Networks |
| 2011 | 5 | Dana Walden | Chairman of 20th Century Fox Television |
| 2011 | 6 | Stacey Snider | Co-chairman and CEO of DreamWorks |
| 2011 | 7 | Nina Tassler | President of CBS |
| 2011 | 8 | Donna Langley | Co-chairman of Universal Pictures |
| 2011 | 9 | Nancy Dubuc | President of Lifetime Network and History Network |
| 2011 | 10 | Sue Kroll | President of worldwide marketing at Warner Bros. Pictures |

| Year | No. | Recipient | Career |
|---|---|---|---|
| 2012 | 1 | Anne Sweeney | Co-chairman of Disney Media Networks; president of Disney-ABC Television Group |
| 2012 | 2 | Bonnie Hammer | President of NBCUniversal Cable |
| 2012 | 3 | Amy Pascal | Co-chairman of Sony Pictures Entertainment |
| 2012 | 4 | Abbe Raven | President and CEO of A&E Television Networks |
| 2012 | 5 | Dana Walden | Co-chairman of 20th Century Fox Television |
| 2012 | 6 | Nina Tassler | President of CBS |
| 2012 | 7 | Nancy Dubuc | President of entertainment and media at A&E Networks |
| 2012 | 8 | Donna Langley | Co-chairman of Universal Pictures |
| 2012 | 9 | Kathleen Kennedy | President of Lucasfilm |
| 2012 | 10 | Sue Kroll | President of worldwide marketing at Warner Bros. Pictures |

| Year | No. | Recipient | Career |
|---|---|---|---|
| 2013 | 1 | Anne Sweeney | Co-chairman of Disney Media Networks; president of Disney-ABC Television Group |
| 2013 | 2 | Bonnie Hammer | Chairman of NBCUniversal Cable |
| 2013 | 3 | Nancy Dubuc | President and CEO of A&E Networks |
| 2013 | 4 | Amy Pascal | Co-chairman of Sony Pictures Entertainment |
| 2013 | 5 | Dana Walden | Chairman and CEO of 20th Century Fox Television |
| 2013 | 6 | Donna Langley | Chairman of Universal Pictures |
| 2013 | 7 | Nina Tassler | President of CBS |
| 2013 | 8 | Oprah Winfrey | Chairman, CEO and chief creative officer of OWN: Oprah Winfrey Network |
| 2013 | 9 | Sue Kroll | President of worldwide marketing and international distribution at Warner Bros. Pictures |
| 2013 | 10 | Kathleen Kennedy | President of Lucasfilm |

| Year | No. | Recipient | Career |
|---|---|---|---|
| 2014 | 1 | Bonnie Hammer | Chairman of NBCUniversal Cable |
| 2014 | 2 | Dana Walden | Chairman and CEO of Fox Television Group |
| 2014 | 3 | Nancy Dubuc | President and CEO of A&E Networks |
| 2014 | 4 | Amy Pascal | Co-chairman of Sony Pictures Entertainment; chairman of SPE Motion Picture Group |
| 2014 | 5 | Donna Langley | Chairman of Universal Pictures |
| 2014 | 6 | Nina Tassler | Chairman of CBS |
| 2014 | 7 | Stacey Snider | Co-chairman of 20th Century Fox Television |
| 2014 | 8 | Oprah Winfrey | Chairman, CEO and chief creative officer of OWN: Oprah Winfrey Network |
| 2014 | 9 | Angelina Jolie | Director and actress |
| 2014 | 10 | Sue Kroll | President of worldwide marketing and international distribution at Warner Bros. Pictures |
