= Norma Zarky =

American lawyer

- Born: Norma Gertrude Goldstein; April 29, 1917; Brooklyn, New York, United States
- Died: October 24, 1977 (aged 60); United States
- Occupation: Lawyer
- Parent(s): Maxwell Goldstein, Fannie Senfeld Goldstein

Norma Goldstein Zarky (April 29, 1917 – October 24, 1977) was a prominent lawyer in Los Angeles, active in the fight for abortion rights and other civil rights.

== Biography ==
Zarky was born in Brooklyn, New York to Maxwell Goldstein and Fannie Senfeld Goldstein. She attended James Madison High School (where the editors of her graduating high school yearbook wrote a poem joking about her aspiration of becoming a lawyer). She attended Barnard College for one year. She then transferred to the University of Wisconsin, where she received her law degree in 1939 through a combined six-year arts and law program. She graduated with membership in Phi Beta Kappa and Order of the Coif. She married Hilbert Philip Zarky on July 29, 1939.

Zarky and her husband moved to Washington, D.C. She worked as a lawyer in the Children's Bureau of the Department of Labor, dealing with violations of the Child Labor laws. She also served as a lawyer for the Railroad Retirement Board, and during World War II she was employed by the Office of Price Administration, enforcing price regulations in the clothing industry. She worked for a number of lawyers, including Joseph L. Rauh, Jr., a prominent civil rights lawyer, and for Arthur Goldberg. She co-authored a number of briefs with Rauh on civil rights cases during the 1950s.

In 1954, during the McCarthy Era, the Department of Justice sought to fire Hilbert Zarky from his position with the Department, based primarily on Norma's very brief involvement with Communism when she was an undergraduate in the mid-1930s, along with such "crimes" as their belonging to a liberal book club and being at meetings attended by "suspect" individuals. After she and her husband filed numerous declarations from friends and prominent individuals regarding their loyalty to the United States, he was reinstated to his position.

After Zarky and her family moved to Los Angeles, she worked briefly for attorney Leonard Horwin (later a mayor of Beverly Hills) and then in 1961 joined the law firm of Mitchell, Silberberg and Knupp, where her husband worked, becoming the firm's first woman partner in 1968. At Mitchell, Silberberg and Knupp, she practiced primarily in the field of entertainment law.

== Death ==
Zarky died of breast cancer on October 24, 1977.

== Pro bono activities ==
Zarky was the first woman to serve as president of the Beverly Hills Bar Association and was a founding member of Women in Film. She was influential in establishing Public Counsel, which is now "the largest pro bono public interest law firm in the world." She also was active in the Constitutional Rights Foundation. In response to the condition of her daughter, who was born profoundly retarded, Zarky served on the board of trustees of the Exceptional Children's Foundation. She was a founder of California Women Lawyers.

Zarky was particularly active in the fight for legalized abortion. She was "one of the two leading California attorneys" strategizing the legal battles. She authored the ACLU's amicus brief in People v. Belous, in which the California Supreme Court, in an opinion by Justice Raymond E. Peters, upheld a woman's right to abortion. She wrote an amicus brief on behalf of the American Association of University Women in Roe v. Wade, the case that established the right to abortion on a nationwide basis.

Zarky was a recipient of the Ernestine Stahlhut Award from the Women Lawyers Association of Los Angeles, given annually to someone who has "attained the respect, admiration and affection of the Bench and Bar by her outstanding character, her dedication to service and her significant contributions to the cause of justice; a person who has challenged women in [the] profession to excel, and who has been an encouragement to young women in our society to seek the law as a profession." She was also a recipient of Women in Film's first Crystal Award, "given to honor outstanding women who, through their endurance and the excellence of their work in film, have helped to expand the role of women within the entertainment industry."

== Legacy ==
In 1979, Women in Film established The Norma Zarky Humanitarian Award, which "is presented to individuals who, like Ms. Zarky herself, have demonstrated enlightened support for the advancement of equal opportunity for all and devotion to the improvement of the human condition."

The University of Southern California awards the Norma Zarky Memorial Award, which was established by the law firm of Mitchell, Silberberg & Knupp and is awarded to the student who has excelled in the field of entertainment law. At UCLA, the Mitchell Silberberg & Knupp, Edward Rubin & Norma Zarky Endowed Scholarship Fund was established to financially assist socio-economically disadvantaged students attending the School of Law in celebration of Mitchell Silberberg & Knupp's Centennial and to honor the memories of Zarky and Edward Rubin, described as "two seminal figures in the history of the firm:"

In 2018, Zarky was added to the James Madison High School Alumni Association Wall of Distinction, joining such other alumni as Ruth Bader Ginsburg, William Gaines (publisher of Mad Magazine), and environmentalist Barry Commoner.
