= Bonnie Hammer =

American businesswoman and network executive

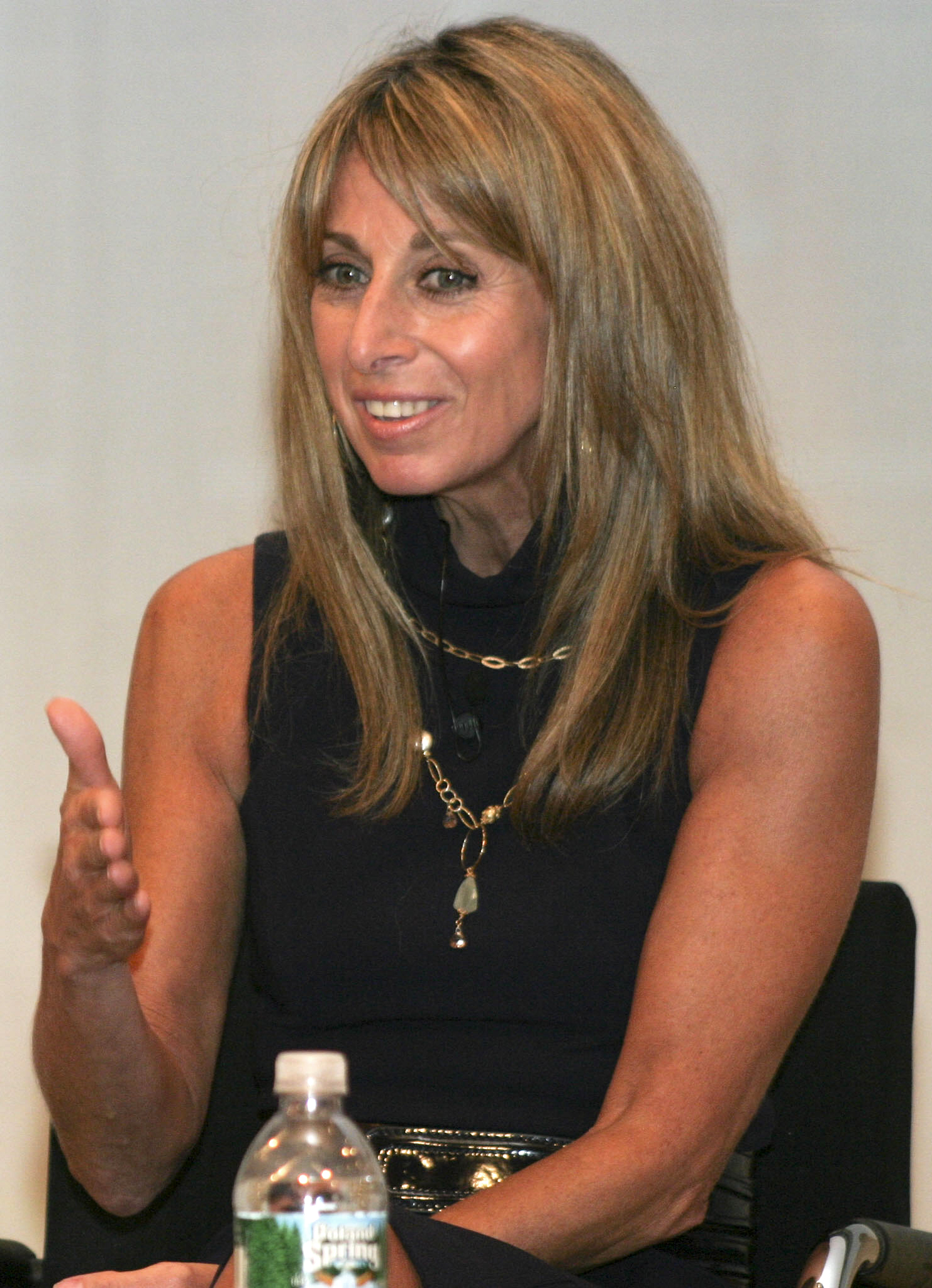
- Hammer in 2009
- Born: 1950 (age 75–76)
- Education: Boston University College of Communication (BA); Boston University School of Education (MA)
- Occupations: Chairman, NBCUniversal Content Studios
- Spouse: Dale Heussner
- Children: 1

Bonnie Hammer (born 1950) is an American network and studio executive. As of 2020, her title is vice-chairman, NBCUniversal.

== Early life ==
Born to a Jewish family in 1950, Bonnie Hammer was raised in Queens, New York, the youngest of three children. Hammer's mother was a full-time mom; her dad, a Russian immigrant, started his own pen company. Intending to become a photojournalist, Hammer enrolled at Boston University College of Communication, earning a bachelor's degree in communications in 1971 and later a master's degree in Media Technology from the Boston University School of Education in 1975.

== Career ==
Hammer began her career in television at WGBH-TV, the public television station in Boston, where she produced This Old House, Infinity Factory and ZOOM for PBS. She later executive-produced Good Day! for Boston's ABC affiliate, WCVB-TV.

Hammer first established herself professionally in New York as an original programming executive at Lifetime Television Network, where she executive produced several award-winning documentaries for the network's acclaimed Signature Series; she was honored with the Lillian Gish Award, several Cine Golden Eagles and the National Association for Youth's Mentor Award.

In 1989 Hammer joined Universal Television as a programming executive. Here, Hammer partnered with Vince McMahon to transform the WWF (wrestling) franchise into a cultural phenomenon. During the Monday Night War WWF ratings slump, Hammer was influential in stalling plans to cancel WWF Raw, and a cancellation was ultimately prevented after Barry Diller, a mentor to Hammer, acquired the USA Network before Raw's contract with the network could expire in May 1998. In 2014, former WWF writer Vince Russo acknowledged "working directly" with Hammer during his time with the company. In 2022, Russo stated that the USA Network "directly oversaw the WWE product" during he and his creative partner Ed Ferrera's time with the WWF, with Ferrera actually serving as a USA Network consultant and working with Hammer.

Hammer also spearheaded the launch of the successful “Sci Fi Prime,” the channel's first full night of original programming, as well as the “I am Sci-Fi” messaging effort which redefined how viewers related to the channel and its programming.

When Hammer took on the role of Sci-Fi president, she brought to network a mini-series in partnership with Steven Spielberg called, Steven Spielberg Presents: Taken. The project, a twenty-hour miniseries about alien abductions, garnered the best ratings Sci-Fi had seen to date and earned the channel its first major Emmy. During the six years Hammer presided over Sci-Fi, the channel's audience doubled and Sci-Fi ranked in cable's top 10 among adults 25 to 54 and 18 to 49.

In 2004 Universal Television merged with NBC and Hammer became president of USA in addition to Sci-Fi. As she had done at Sci-Fi, Hammer rebranded USA with “Characters Welcome,” – conveying the message that people, and “wacky but memorable characters” were at the heart of the channel's programming. USA has ranked #1 among cable networks for a record-setting eight years. After her success at Sci-Fi and USA, Hammer was named the most influential woman in cable by CableWorld magazine.

In March 2008, Hammer took leadership at the new studio Universal Cable Productions. At the same time she became head of the digital networks Cloo, Chiller and Universal HD. Adding to the list in 2011, she assumed responsibility for E!, G4 and Wilshire Studios. In July 2012, under the leadership of Hammer, E! unveiled a major brand evolution of the network and relaunch of its market-leading E! Online website, both of which allowed E! to become the global destination for pop culture. In September 2013, she oversaw the launch of Esquire Network, a lifestyle and entertainment network that replaced Style Network (Variety).

In 2019, Hammer lead the creation of the management team of Peacock, a streaming service to be launched in July 2020.

Outside of NBCUniversal, Bonnie Hammer serves on the Board of Directors of eBay and IAC/InteractiveCorp.

== Social activism ==
While at USA Network, Hammer spearheaded the “Erase the Hate” pro-social campaign, which earned a National Emmy Governor's Award. She later extended it to create “Characters Unite,” a public service program to combat hate and discrimination and promoting tolerance and acceptance. Under Hammer's leadership, Characters Unite has grown into an award-winning, multi-platform initiative that includes on-air programming such as documentaries and themed episodes of USA series, public service announcements, digital content through the website and social media outlets, and community outreach and high school education programs, featuring a partnership with storytelling group The Moth. In 2018, Erase The Hate was relaunched in partnership with Civic Nation, a non-partisan non-profit organization, to support and celebrate those taking action in the fight against hate across America.

Hammer also created the “Visions for Tomorrow” campaign, which is an effort to spark America's leading thinkers, organizations, and policymakers into searching for ways to solve society's most pressing issues.

== Accolades ==
Hammer has received several awards for her work in the span of her career. She has consistently been named to The Hollywood Reporter's Power 100, an annual list of the most influential women in Hollywood. She was given the National Association of Television Programming Executives’ 2007 Brandon Tartikoff Legacy Award and inducted into Broadcasting & Cable's Hall of Fame the same year. Hammer has also received a MUSE award for outstanding vision and achievement from New York Women in Film & Television. She has been repeatedly featured on lists such as the "50 Most Powerful Women" in Fortune, "The World’s 100 Most Powerful Women" in Forbes, as well as the "Powers that Be" in Vanity Fair. In 2012, Hammers was given the Crystal + Lucy Award for Excellence in Television by Women in Film.

Praise for her social activism includes her 2012 honor by B’nai B’rith for “her commitment to initiatives confronting racism and bigotry’; and she was cited by storytelling organization The Moth for “philanthropic leadership in programs to end prejudice, discrimination and bullying.” Hammer was given the 2010 Vanguard Award for Distinguished Leadership from the National Cable Television Association, and the Anti-Defamation League's Entertainment Industry Award.

Listed on Vanity Fair's 2016 New Establishment List, described as 100 “Silicon Valley hotshots, Hollywood moguls, Wall Street titans, and cultural icons.”.

In June 2021, in recognition of her track record as an innovator, leader and mentor, Variety announced that Hammer will be saluted with Variety's TV Legacy Award.

== Personal life ==
Hammer is an accomplished photographer, and her work has been displayed in galleries and published in Time, the Boston Globe, the Boston Herald, the Los Angeles Times, and various Houghton-Mifflin and Little Brown books. She resides in Westport, Connecticut, with her husband, Dale Heussner. Her husband has one child from a previous marriage and they have one child together. Hammer serves on the Motion Picture & Television Fund (MPTF) Board of Governors. She has considered IAC owner Barry Diller, who acquired the USA Network in 1997, to be a mentor.
