= Telemundo Deportes =

Sports programming division of Telemundo

- Launched: 1987 (as Deportes Telemundo); May 12, 2015 (as NBC Deportes); July 25, 2016 (as Telemundo Deportes)
- Division of: Telemundo
- Country of origin: United States
- Owner: NBC Sports Group
- Key people: Ray Warren (President, Telemundo Deportes); Eli Velazquez (executive vice president, Telemundo Deportes); Robert Pardo (Vice President of Production Operations, Telemundo Deportes); Claudio Prizont (Editorial Director, Telemundo Deportes); Christopher Suarez-Meyers (Director of Operations, Telemundo Deportes); Gary Zenkel (President, NBC Olympics and Operations, Strategy, NBC Sports Group; Mark Lazarus (chairman, NBC Sports Group)
- Headquarters: Miami, Florida; Stamford, Connecticut
- Major broadcasting contracts: FIFA World Cup; FIFA Women's World Cup; Olympics; Premier League; Bundesliga (including Super Cup); NBA; WNBA; NASCAR; NFL; US Soccer
- Sister network: Telemundo; TeleXitos; Universo; Peacock
- Original language: Spanish
- Official website: telemundo.com/deportes

Telemundo Deportes is Telemundo's sports programming division. It is owned by the NBC Sports Group, a unit of NBCUniversal, a division of Comcast. It is responsible for the production of sports events and magazine programs that air on Telemundo, NBCUniversal's other Spanish language television networks TeleXitos and Universo, and the streaming service Peacock. Originating as the former's sports division Deportes Telemundo from 1999 to 2015, it broadcast an array of sports events, including the soccer matches from various international soccer leagues including the FIFA World Cup and the Olympic Games, among others.

== History ==
=== Origins as Deportes Telemundo ===
Former logo as Deportes Telemundo, used from 2002 to 2015.

The division was originally formed in 1987 as Deportes Telemundo, which at first exclusively served as the sports division of Telemundo, with the acquisition of rights to soccer matches to select teams from the Mexican Primera División (now Liga MX). Following NBC's $2.7 billion purchase of Telemundo Communications Group on October 11, 2001, Deportes Telemundo began to gradually be integrated into NBC Sports, although it would maintain sports programming rights separate from the main NBC broadcast network and its sister cable channels. Under NBC (which ironically lost the rights to the league that year to ABC), on August 20, 2002, Telemundo signed a three-year agreement with the National Basketball Association (NBA) for the Spanish language broadcast rights to 15 NBA and up to ten WNBA regular season games; Telemundo and the NBA did not renew the deal upon its expiration following the 2004–05 season.

On August 12, 2009, the division's production responsibilities were extended to sister cable network mun2 (now NBC Universo), when it carried an English language broadcast of a World Cup qualifier between the United States and Mexico national teams, which was broadcast as part of a one-day free preview available to most cable and satellite providers though was presented by NBC Sports; and furthermore in January 2010, when mun2 began airing Liga MX games under the brand Fútbol Mexicano (most of which aired as English language simulcasts of Telemundo's Fútbol Estelar soccer telecasts).

On October 28, 2012, NBC Sports also announced a three-year, $250 million deal to televise Premier League matches, giving Telemundo and mun2 the Spanish language rights (with the latter simulcasting games broadcast in English on NBCSN) beginning with the 2013–14 season, replacing ESPN and Fox Soccer as the league's U.S. broadcasters; prior to the arrangement, NBC had proposed Telemundo for use as a Spanish-language simulcast partner for select sporting events for years after the 2001 purchase.

On July 23, 2013, NBC re-acquired rights to NASCAR beginning in the 2015 season, and announced that it would include the option to air Spanish-language broadcasts on Telemundo and mun2. As a prelude to the contract, mun2 carried the 2014 Toyota 120—the season opener of Mexico's NASCAR Toyota Series at Phoenix Raceway—on February 28, 2014.

On October 22, 2011, Deportes Telemundo acquired the Spanish language rights to broadcast FIFA tournaments beginning 2015 for around $600 million, replacing Univision as the Spanish language broadcaster of events such as the FIFA World Cup for the first time since 1970 (Fox acquired the English language U.S. broadcast rights through a separate agreement). The deal was extended on February 12, 2015, to include rights to the 2018, 2022 and the 2026 FIFA World Cup.

Through NBC's rights agreement with the National Football League (NFL), mun2 carried a Spanish simulcast of a Thanksgiving matchup between the Seattle Seahawks and San Francisco 49ers on November 27, 2014; on February 1, 2015, the rebranded NBC Universo served as the Spanish-language broadcaster of Super Bowl XLIX (which NBC held rights to broadcast that year). On January 13, 2015, NBCUniversal promoted Deportes Telemundo senior vice president of sports Eli Velázquez to the newly created position of Executive Vice President, Sports within the company's Hispanic Enterprises and Content unit, following the departure of the sports division's executive vice president Jorge Hidalgo (whose position was eliminated as part of restructuring of the division).

=== Reorganization with NBC Sports ===
On May 16, 2015, during Telemundo's 2015–16 upfront presentation in New York City, it was announced that Deportes Telemundo would be replaced by a new division initially known as NBC Deportes; the new division was formed as a branch of the English-language NBC Sports division, and became responsible for sports content for Telemundo, NBC Universo and related digital platforms. While it retained all existing sports telecast rights and programs aired by both Telemundo and NBC Universo, the latter network also began to expand its sports coverage, primarily in preparation for the 2016 Summer Olympics and the start of the division's contract with FIFA—whose first events included the 2015 U-20 World Cup and Women's World Cup.

It was announced in August 2015 that the division would migrate its operations from Telemundo's headquarters in Hialeah, Florida, to NBC Sports Group's facility in Stamford, Connecticut, in a phased process that was expected to be completed by the second quarter of 2016. Around 70 employees, including production staff and on-air talent, were given a month to decide if they want to remain with NBC Deportes and relocate to Stamford, providing relocation packages to employees who opt to move and severance packages to employees who chose not to move and are unable to find other jobs within NBCUniversal Hispanic Enterprises and Content; most positions within NBC Deportes that were based in the Hialeah offices – with the exception of NBCDeportes.com digital staff, some tech operators employed with the sports unit and production and on-air staff for the late-night magazine program Titulares y Más, which will remain at the Telemundo headquarters – were eliminated in the move, necessitating the employee offers. Around 30 additional staffing positions were expected to be added alongside the existing employees upon the move to Stamford, while the division will invest heavily in the division's infrastructure and sets for its news and analysis programs.

The announced move to Stamford, Connecticut was cancelled in November 2015. The division would change its name from NBC Deportes to Telemundo Deportes in 2016.

Telemundo Deportes moved into Telemundo Center in Miami when it opened in April 2018.

== Programs throughout the years ==
Telemundo Deportes holds the sports broadcast rights to several sporting events (with much of its programming available through agreements with soccer leagues and organizations) for broadcast on Telemundo and Universo, and also produces sports news, magazine and analysis programs that mostly air on Telemundo. Telemundo used to produce Rumbo al Mundial with the Conmebol Qualifying Soccer games for the World Cup, this was huge with Spanish speaking audiences but was not repeated for the 2020 World Cup Qualifier in Qatar.

It also produces several specials in conjunction with organizations to which NBC Sports maintains programming agreement such as the National Football League (NFL).

=== Current broadcast rights ===
Events which are held by NBC Sports for their English language channels are designated in Italics.

American football

- NBC Sunday Night Football: (2014–present).
  - Super Bowls: All years where NBC holds rights since 2014 (XLIX, LII, LVI, LX)
    - Co-agreement with Fox for a separate feeds (LIX).

Baseball

- Major League Baseball on NBC (2026–present; airing all NBC's broadcast on Universo).

Basketball

- NBA en Telemundo (2003–2005, 2025–present).
- WNBA en Telemundo (2003–2005, 2026–present).

Soccer

- Premier League (2013–present)
- Bundesliga (2026–present; including Franz Beckenbauer Supercup).
- Serie A (2026–present; including Coppa Italia and Supercoppa Italiana).
- Fútbol Estelar: Liga MX and Liga MX Femenil; used in years where Telemundo has broadcast rights to home matches of specific Liga MX and Liga MX Femenil teams (2020–present for Chivas Guadalajara, Tigres UANL and FC Juárez home matches and selected Chivas Femenil, Tigres Femenil and FC Juárez Femenil home matches).
- FIFA U-17 World Cup (2015, 2017, 2019, and 2023)
- FIFA U-20 World Cup (2015, 2017, 2019, 2023, and 2025)
- FIFA World Cup (2018, 2022, and 2026).
- FIFA World Cup qualifiers (Rumbo Al Mundial)
  - CONCACAF qualifiers (2018, 2022, and 2026; except U.S. and Mexico home matches)
  - CONMEBOL qualifiers (2026; only Brazil and Argentina home matches)
- SheBelieves Cup
- U.S. men's national soccer team (2023–present; except for select CONCACAF Nations League and all Mexico home matches)
- U.S. women's national soccer team (2023–present; except for select CONCACAF Nations League and all Mexico home matches)

Futsal

- FIFA Futsal World Cup (2016, 2020, 2024, and 2028)

Olympic Games

- Juegos Olimpicos por Telemundo
  - Summer Olympic Games (2004, 2008, 2012, 2016, 2020, 2024, 2028, 2032)

Other programming

- Boxeo Telemundo (1987–present)
- Rumbo Al Mundial (1987–present)
- Titulares Telemundo (1999–present)
- El pelotazo (2025–present)

=== Upcoming broadcast rights ===
Soccer

- UEFA club competitions (2027–future, includes Champions League, Europa League, Conference League and Super Cup).

=== Former programs ===
American football

- Thursday Night Football: (2016–2017)

Soccer

- FIFA Women's World Cup (2015, 2019, and 2023)
- FIFA Club World Cup (2014–2018)
- Copa América (2019)
- Copa Libertadores (2018 Final 2nd Leg ONLY via sublicense from Fox Deportes).

Other programming

- Ritmo Deportivo (2002–2015)
- Titulares Y Mas (2005–2025)

== Notable personalities ==
=== Current ===
==== Play-by-play ====
- Luis Omar Tapia (lead) (Soccer)
- José Luis López Salido (Soccer/Baseball)
- Copán Álvarez (Soccer)
- Edgar Lopez (Football)
- Jose Hernandez (Soccer)
- José Bauz (Soccer)
- Luis Gerardo Bucci
- José Francisco Rivera (Baseball)
- Alfre Alvarez (Baseball)

==== Color commentators/Analysts ====
- Diego Balado (Soccer)
- Jorge D. Calvo (Soccer)
- Omar Zerón (Soccer)
- Jaime Fernando Macías (Soccer)
- Greivis Vásquez
- Rolando Cantú (Football)
- René Giraldo (Football)
- Pablo Mariño (Soccer)
- Isabella Echeverri (Soccer)
- Diana Rincón (on loan from ESPN South America)
- Jaime Herrera Garduño (soccer rules analyst)

==== Reporters ====
- Diego Arrioja
- Manuel Sánchez
- Carlos Yustis
- Alonso González
- Arantza Fernández
- Pablo Aguabella

==== Studio hosts ====
- Miguel Gurwitz
- Verónica Rodríguez
- Carlota Vizmanos
- Adriana Monsalve
- Carmen Boquín
- Alejandro Berry
- Frederik Oldenburg

=== Former ===
==== Play-by-play ====
- Félix de Jesús
- Erasmo Provenza
- Sammy Sadovnik
- Juan Guillermo Arango
- José Francisco Rivera
- Diego Pessolano
- Álvaro Martín
- Andrés Cantor

==== Color commentators/analysts ====
- Norberto Longo
- Viviana Vila
- Jorge Andres
- Carlos Hermosillo
- Manuel Sol
- Eduardo Biscayart
- Walter Reinaldo Roque
- Natalia Astrain
- Amelia Valverde

==== Reporters ====
- Kaziro Aoyama
- Rodrigo Camacho

==== Studio hosts ====
- Karim Mendiburu
- Ana Jurka
- Rosina Grosso
- Leti Coo
- Ariana Figuera
