= Anne Sweeney =

American business woman (born 1957)

- Born: November 4, 1957 (age 68); Hudson, New York
- Education: College of New Rochelle Harvard University
- Occupations: Board of Directors: Netflix, LEGO A/S; Board of Trustees: Mayo Clinic; J. Paul Getty Trust
- Known for: Disney president and co-chair, 1996–2014

Anne Marie Sweeney (born November 4, 1957) is an American businesswoman. From 2015 to 2026, she served as a member of the board of directors at Netflix. She was formerly the co-chair of Disney Media Networks and President of the Disney–ABC Television Group, and the President of Disney Channel from 1996 to 2014.

In March 2014, she announced that she would be leaving her position at the Walt Disney Company to become a television director. She was a member of the George Foster Peabody Awards board of jurors.

== Early life and education ==
Sweeney was born in Hudson, New York. She graduated with a B.A. degree from the College of New Rochelle and earned an Ed.M. degree from Harvard University.

== Nickelodeon and Fox ==
Prior to her work at Disney/ABC she was chairman and CEO of FX Networks, Inc., from 1993 to 1996. During her tenure, she presided over the launch of two basic cable networks, FX, an entertainment network and FXM: Movies from Fox, Hollywood's first studio-based movie network.

Before joining Fox, Sweeney spent 12 years at Nickelodeon/Nick at Nite in various executive positions, most recently as senior vice president of Program Enterprises. She oversaw Nickelodeon's international expansion, including launching the channel in the United Kingdom, resulting in a joint venture with British Sky Broadcasting.

== The Walt Disney Company ==
Sweeney joined The Walt Disney Company in February 1996 as president of Disney Channel and executive vice president of Disney/ABC Cable Networks.

From October 2000 to April 2004, Sweeney served as president of ABC Cable Networks Group and The Disney Channel Worldwide. Continuing with the distribution strategy that was begun by her predecessor, The Disney Channel, more than quintupled its subscriber base with its mix of original series and movies and acquired programming. It is now available on basic cable in more than 87 million homes in the United States. Disney Channel executives hoped to become more "boy friendly" in 2010; especially when Good Luck Charlie premiered and when Aaron Stone and Zeke and Luther joined the main program line-up.

In April 2004, she was named Co-chair Disney Media Networks and president of the Disney/ABC Television Group. In this role, Sweeney was responsible for Disney's entertainment and news television properties globally. These include the ABC Television Network, which encompasses ABC Entertainment, ABC Kids, ABC Daytime, ABC Sports and ABC News; ABC Studios, which is the television production division of the Disney-ABC Television Group; and Disney ABC Cable Networks Group, comprising The Disney Channel Worldwide—which has grown to 24 wholly owned international channels—Toon Disney, SOAPnet, ABC Family and Jetix.

She oversaw Walt Disney Television Animation, Buena Vista Worldwide Television and Walt Disney Television International, and managed Disney's equity interests in Lifetime Entertainment Services, and A&E Television Networks.

Sweeney also oversaw the launch of the 24-hour animation channel Toon Disney in April 1998, and built it to its current reach of more than 52 million homes in the USA. Less than two years later, in January 2000, she oversaw the launch of SOAPnet, the 24-hour soap opera network now seen in more than 61.4 million homes.

== Awards and honors ==
- Women in Cable & Telecommunications Executive of the Year (1994),* Woman of the Year (1997).
- STAR Award from American Women in Radio and Television in 1995. Advocate Leader Award from the Southern California chapter of Women in Cable & Telecommunications (1998).
- Inducted into the American Advertising Federation's Advertising Hall of Achievement in 1996.
- Lucy Award from Women in Film Los Angeles in 2002.
- Muse Award from New York Women in Film & Television in 2004.
- Inducted into the Broadcasting & Cable "Hall of Fame" in 2005.
- Inducted into the Cable Hall of Fame in 2007
- Ranked #1 "Most Powerful Woman in Entertainment" by The Hollywood Reporter, eight out of 10 years, 2004–2014
- Named among the "50 Most Powerful Women in Business" by Fortune, 2003 – 2014
- Cable Television Public Affairs Association's President's Award
- Named one of "The World's 100 Most Powerful Women" by Forbes, 2004–2013.

== Personal life ==
Active in organizations both inside and outside of the cable industry, Sweeney is a board member of A&E Television Group, the Museum of Television & Radio, Special Olympics and an honorary chair of Cable Positive.

Sweeney is married to Philip Miller and they have two children, Christopher and Rosemary. Christopher is on the autism spectrum.

Sweeney is a Roman Catholic and attends St. Monica Church in California.
