= People v. Belous =

1969 California Supreme Court decision concerning abortion

- Supreme Court of California

Decided Sept. 5, 1969
- Full case name: The People, Plaintiff and Respondent, v. Leon Phillip Belous, Defendant and Appellant.

Holding
- A California law restricting abortions was unconstitutionally vague

People v. Belous, 71 Cal.2d 954 (1969) was a case decided by the Supreme Court of California which found a statute restricting abortion services to be unconstitutionally vague.

== Background ==
Dr Leon Belous was convicted in January 1967 by a Los Angeles Superior Court jury of abortion and conspiracy to commit an abortion after referring a client to an abortion provider.

The criminal abortion statute provided that:

Every person who provides, supplies, or administers to any woman, or procures any woman to take any medicine, drug, or substance, or uses or employs any instrument or other means whatever, with intent thereby to procure the miscarriage of such woman, unless the same is necessary to preserve her life, is punishable by imprisonment in the State prison not less than two years nor more than five years

— California Penal Code pre-1967,

Amidst threats from anti-abortion activists, Belous unsuccessfully appealed to the Court of Appeals. With the help of American Civil Liberties Union attorneys, including Norma Zarky, Belous then appealed to the California Supreme Court.

== Decision ==
In a 4-3 decision, the California Supreme Court, in an opinion authored by Justice Raymond Peters, found the 19th Century abortion law, which made exception only when “necessary to preserve [a woman's] life”, to be unconstitutionally vague.

The court concluded that the statute was not "susceptible of a construction that does not violate legislative intent and that is sufficiently certain to satisfy due process requirements without improperly infringing on fundamental constitutional rights".

Although the statute had already been repealed shortly after Belous was convicted in 1967, the court's decision indirectly challenged the legality of abortion restrictions in 41 other states.

== Legacy ==
The Supreme Court of the United States declined to hear the appeal of state attorney general Thomas Lynch.

The Supreme Court's decision in Roe v. Wade (1973) cited People v. Belous. Linda Coffee, who argued in the case, later referred to the Belous decision as "the most pertinent case I reviewed".
