= Hilbert Philip Zarky =

American lawyer

Hilbert Phillip Zarky (September 19, 1912 – April 9, 1989) was a prominent tax attorney, first for the United States Department of Justice and then in the private sector; he also was a significant contributor to civil liberties litigation.

Zarky was born in Madison, Wisconsin on September 19, 1912, to Max and Gertrude Zarky (born Gertrude Sure). He attended Central High School. He then attended the University of Wisconsin, where he obtained a law degree in 1937, graduating Order of the Coif. In 1939, he married Norma Gertrude Goldstein.

After graduation, Zarky moved to Washington, D.C., and worked for the Treasury Department. In 1943 he joined the Department of Justice, where he became a Special Assistant to the Attorney General, preparing and arguing tax cases on appeal in the Circuit Courts and the U.S. Supreme Court. He appeared on behalf of the Department of Justice in over 300 cases in the Courts of Appeals and dozens of cases in the United States Supreme Court.

In 1947, Zarky co-authored the Solicitor General's amicus brief in Shelley v. Kraemer, urging the Supreme Court to strike down racially restrictive covenants. However, his name and that of the other Jewish co-authors were stricken out of concern that it would appear that "a bunch of Jewish lawyers in the Department of Justice put this out."

In 1954, during the McCarthy Era, the Department of Justice sought to fire Zarky from his position with the Department, based primarily on his wife's brief flirtation with Communism when she was an undergraduate in the mid-1930s, along with such "crimes" as their belonging to a particular book club and knowing certain "suspect" individuals. After they filed numerous declarations from friends and prominent individuals regarding their loyalty to the United States, he was reinstated to his position.

In 1957, Zarky moved to Los Angeles and joined the firm of Mitchell, Silberberg & Knupp, where he focused on corporate tax issues.

Zarky co-authored an amicus brief in Furman v. Georgia, in which the Supreme Court (temporarily) struck down the death penalty. He also wrote other amicus briefs attacking the death penalty, including its imposition on juveniles or those who were juveniles at the time of their offense.

Zarky died in Los Angeles on April 9, 1989, of complications from throat cancer.
