= Abbe Raven =

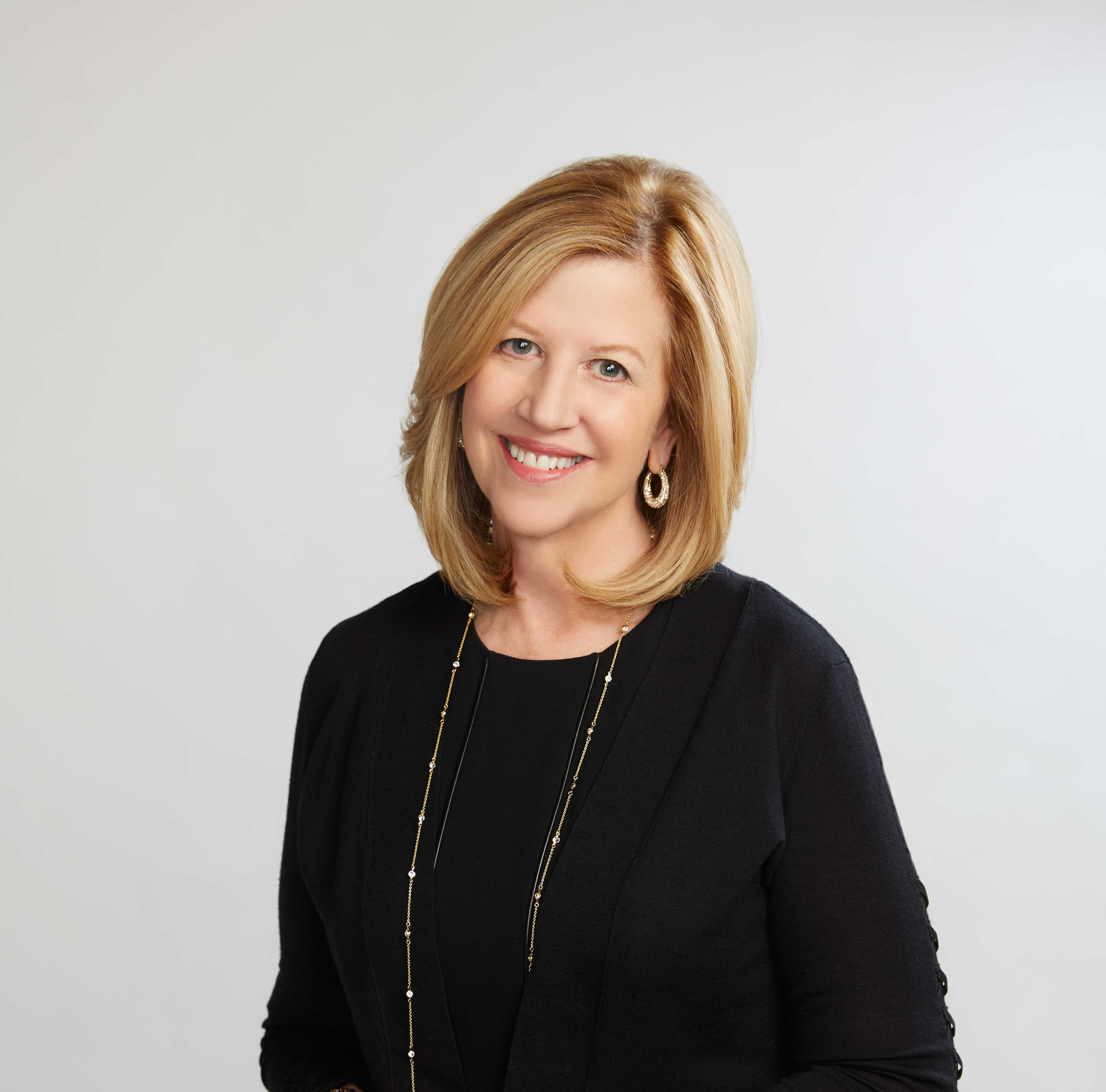
- Born: Laurelton, New York, US
- Occupations: Chairman Emeritus, A+E Networks
- Spouse: Martin S. Tackel (lawyer)

Abbe Raven is the chairman emeritus of A+E Networks. Raven previously retired from her role as chairman on February 2, 2015. She was asked to return in March 2018 upon the departure of the CEO, Nancy Dubuc. Raven is also the former president and CEO of A+E Networks. Raven is one of the original founders of the HISTORY brand and was one of the longest running employees at A+E Networks. She began her career in 1982 as a production assistant and rose through the ranks to become the second CEO and first chairman in A+E Networks' history.

== Background and education ==
Raven was born and raised in Laurelton, Queens. In 1974, she received her B.A. in Theatre from the State University of New York at Buffalo. Raven received her M.A. in Theatre & Film from Hunter College. She was awarded Honorary Doctorates of Humane Letters from Hunter College, Florida Southern College and State University of New York at Buffalo.

Raven met her husband, Martin Tackel, while at the State University of New York at Buffalo. Tackel is an attorney and a commercial arbitrator.

== Career ==
After graduating from the State University of New York at Buffalo, Raven was a stage manager for off-Broadway and regional theater. She took an opportunity to work for a company called DAYTIME that was just starting out. It later became the Arts & Entertainment Network. She was promoted to senior vice president and put in charge of all production, post-production and studio facilities. Raven then transferred to the HISTORY brand as the executive vice president and general manager and was in charge of all programming. She was then promoted to President of A&E Network and The Biography Channel. In March 2005, Raven became the president and CEO of A+E Networks. In June 2013, she became Chairman of A+E Networks. Raven retired and became Chairman Emeritus of A+E Networks in February 2015. Upon the departure of CEO Nancy Dubuc in March 2018, Raven returned to A+E as Acting Chairman.

In October 2009, she was inducted into the Broadcasting & Cable Hall of Fame.

In 2010, she was named in The Hollywood Reporter's Women in Entertainment Power 100 list and named one of the top 5 most powerful women in entertainment.

She was chairman of the board and now alumni board member of the Smithsonian National Museum of American History.

Raven was elected as vice chair of the inaugural Smithsonian American Women's History Museum Advisory Council

Raven is on the board of directors of the Breast Cancer Research Foundation.

She previously served on the board of directors of Pencil, a non-profit group that brings corporate know how to New York City public schools.

She is a director of the International Academy of Television Arts and Sciences and is on their executive committee.

In 2018, Raven was awarded an Honorary Doctorate in Humane Letters from the State University of New York at Buffalo. Hunter College, and Florida Southern College.

Raven was a co-producer of the Tony-nominated Broadway musical The Prom, which opened on November 15, 2018. As a co-producer, she received a Tony Award for best musical revival of Stephen Sondheim's Company in 2021. She is also co-producer of the current Broadway revival of Death of a Salesman, which opened Oct 9,2022.
