= Pearlena Igbokwe =

Nigerian journalist

- Born: 1960s Lagos, Nigeria
- Education: Yale University (B.A. in English); Columbia University (MBA)
- Occupation: Television executive
- Employer: NBCUniversal

Pearlena Igbokwe is the chairwoman of Universal Studio Group, a division of NBCUniversal. She is responsible for all aspects of creative affairs and production for four studios: Universal Television, Universal Content Productions (UCP), Universal International Studios and Universal Television Alternative Studio.

She is the first woman of African descent to head a major U.S. television studio, as she comes from the Igbo tribe of Nigeria.

== Early life and education ==
Igbokwe was born in Lagos, Nigeria in the 1960s. She lived with her family in a village which was affected by bomber planes while they depended on airlifted food during the Nigerian Civil War. She moved to the United States at the age of six. She earned a Bachelor of Arts in English from Yale University and an MBA from Columbia University.

== Career ==
While an undergrad, Igbokwe completed two summer internships at NBC, first in the sales department and then at NBC News. After graduating, Igbokwe worked in the financial services industry before going to business school. After earning her MBA, Igbokwe worked briefly at HBO before accepting an entry-level job at Showtime.

Igbokwe worked at Showtime for 20 years. At Showtime, Igbokwe was involved in the production of Dexter and Nurse Jackie, and developed the pilot for Masters of Sex, starring Michael Sheen. In addition, she shepherded Tracey Ullman's State of the Union, Damon Wayans' The Underground, Kirstie Alley's Fat Actress and the television adaptation of the hit feature film Barbershop. She was also instrumental in the five-season run of the hit Showtime series Soul Food, a two-time NAACP Image Award winner for best drama series.

In 2012, Igbokwe was recruited to lead the development of drama programming for NBC Entertainment. In that role, she developed successful series, including The Blacklist and This Is Us.

From June 2016 to September 2020, Igbokwe was president of Universal Television where she oversaw creative development, casting and production for one of the country's largest and most successful studios. During her tenure, the studio had more than 40 shows in active production for both NBC and outside networks, including Russian Doll, The Good Place, The Bold Type, FBI, and The Gilded Age.

In 2020, Igbokwe was promoted to Chairman, Universal Studio Group.

In 2025, Igbokwe was promoted Chairman, Television Studios, NBC Entertainment & Peacock Scripted, as part of a restructuring of NBCUniversal's entertainment division. Igbokwe would continue to lead Universal Studio Group, but add NBC Entertainment as part of a more vertically integrated model for NBCUniversal.
