= NBC Sports Group =

Division of NBCUniversal

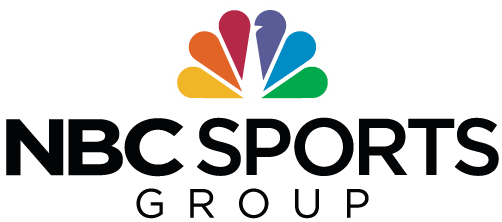
- Type: Division
- Industry: Television
- Founded: 2011; 15 years ago
- Headquarters: Stamford, Connecticut, United States
- Key people: Rick Cordella (President)
- Parent: NBCUniversal Media Group
- Divisions: Telemundo Deportes; NBC Sports; NBC Sports Digital; NBC Sports Films; NBC Sports Radio; NBC Sports Regional Networks; NBCSN
- Subsidiaries: NBC Olympics LLC; NBC Sports Ventures LLC
- Website: nbcsportsgrouppressbox.com

NBC Sports Group is a division of NBCUniversal Media Group. Founded in 2011, it is responsible for NBC Sports' media properties, encompassing the NBC television network's sports division as well as day-to-day operation of the company's sports-oriented cable networks and other properties such as NBC Sports Radio.

== Group history ==
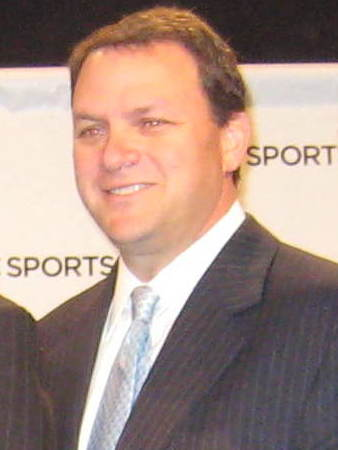
Mark Lazarus

The unit has its origins in Comcast Sports Group, a division which oversaw Comcast's Golf Channel and Versus cable networks, as well as the regional sports network chain Comcast SportsNet. In February 2011, Comcast completed its acquisition of a majority stake in NBC Universal. Following the acquisition, plans were unveiled for the three networks to be subsumed by the NBC network's existing division NBC Sports, under the title NBC Sports Group, with Dick Ebersol as chairman. Mark Lazarus, formerly the head of Turner Entertainment Group, was named president of NBC Sports Cable Group. Comcast Sports Group president Jon Litner assumed the role of president of Comcast SportsNet and Versus, while former NBC Sports executive vice president Mike McCarley was named president of Golf Channel. John Miller was named executive vice president of NBC Sports and Versus.

In May 2011, Lazarus took over for Ebersol as chairman of the group. In June 2011, NBC Sports Group purchased back the Alli Sports share held by MTV Networks Music Group in June 2011 and previously sold by NBC Sports to them in 2008. On January 1, 2012, Versus was renamed NBC Sports Network.

On December 9, 2012, Yahoo and the NBC Sports Group announced a content and promotional deal combining Yahoo Sports’ original reporting expertise, coverage of big events, Rivals’ college content and popular fantasy sports products with NBC Sports Group's growing digital assets, and significant television promotion and integration.

On March 18, 2013, nearly all of the operations for NBC Sports and NBCSN began to be based out of a purpose-built facility in Stamford, Connecticut. The move was made mainly to take advantage of tax credits given by the state of Connecticut, which NBC has taken advantage of previously with the daytime talk shows of its sister broadcast syndication division.

Telemundo Deportes, a dedicated Hispanic sports production unit, was also announced by Joe Uva, Chairman of NBCUniversal Hispanic Group, and chairman Mark Lazarus at May 2015 Upfronts. Telemundo Deportes was also in process of moving to the NBC Sports Group facility in Stamford.

NBC Sports Group formed NBC Sports Films in 2015 for long form sports documentaries for the sports group's platforms. The first film was Center of Attention: The Unreal Life of Derek Sanderson which was broadcast on NBC Sports Network June 8 after Game 3 of the 2015 Stanley Cup Finals.

On October 22, 2015, it was announced that Universal Sports Network would close down on November 16, 2015, and that NBC Sports would inherit the network's portfolio of sports rights for its own networks and channels. The Group launched two channels just for the 2016 Olympic games, NBC Olympic Basketball and NBC Olympic Soccer.

In May 2016, NBC Sports Group broke out its streaming technology unit into an entity known as Playmaker Media, to serve other NBCUniversal properties as well as third-party clients (thus competing with BAMTech). In June 2016, NBC Sports Group launched NBC Sports Gold, an over-the-top streaming service containing subscription-based packages focused on different sports.

In July 2016, NBC Sports Group acquired Sport Ngin, a Minneapolis-based provider of digital services for youth and amateur sports organizations. The unit was renamed SportsEngine. The group purchased the All-American Bowl high school all star game in February 2019.

In February 2020, it was reported that Golf Channel would re-locate its operations from Orlando to Stamford over the next 12 to 18 months.

In January 2021, it was announced that NBCSN will cease operations by the end of the year, and that its programming was slated to be moved to USA Network and Peacock.

In August 2021, it was announced that NBC Sports' technology and digital operations would be re-aligned under the new division NBC Sports Next.

In November 2024, Comcast announced that it would spin off most of its cable networks and select digital properties into a new publicly traded company (later named Versant), including CNBC, Golf Channel and USA Network. The divestment was approved by Comcast's board of directors in December 2025, and completed in January 2026. After the spin-off, NBC Sports and Versant have continued sharing select programming.

NBC Sports relaunched NBCSN relaunched in November 2025 to continue having a secondary linear television outlet. Its programming draws from content that was previously exclusive to Peacock, though some programming remains exclusive to the streaming service.

== Units ==
=== Broadcasting ===
- NBC Sports
  - NBC Sports on USA Network
  - NBC Sports on CNBC
- NBC Sports Regional Networks
- Telemundo Deportes
- NBCSN

=== Digital ===
- Playmaker Media
- NBC Sports Next
  - Betting, Gaming & Emerging Media
    - NBC Sports Audio
    - NBC Sports Edge
  - Golf
    - GolfNow
    - GolfPass
    - EZLinks
  - Youth and Recreation
    - SportsEngine
    - GoMotion
    - TeamUnify
    - TourneyMachine

==== NBC Sports Ventures ====
- NBC Sports Radio
- Alli Sports (Alli, Alliance of Action Sports, LLC): Reebok Spartan Race, Lucas Oil Pro Motocross, Red Bull Signature Series

=== Minor holdings ===
- MLB Network^{(5.44%)}
- NHL Network^{(15.6%)}

=== Former properties ===
- Golf Channel
- Olympic Channel
