= NBCUniversal Media Group =

American television group owned by Comcast through NBCUniversal

- Formerly: NBC Broadcasting (1992–2016); NBC Broadcasting and Sports (2016–19); NBCUniversal Broadcast, Cable, Sports and News (2019–20); NBCUniversal Television and Streaming (2020–23)
- Type: Division
- Industry: Television
- Founded: 1992; 34 years ago
- Headquarters: 30 Rockefeller Plaza, New York City, New York, United States
- Area served: United States
- Parent: General Electric (1992–2004); NBCUniversal (2004–present)
- Divisions: NBC Entertainment; NBCUniversal Local; NBCUniversal Cable Entertainment; NBCUniversal Syndication Studios; NBCUniversal Direct-to-Consumer and Digital Enterprises; NBC Sports Group; NBCUniversal Telemundo Enterprises
- Subsidiaries: NBCUniversal International Networks; International Media Distribution

NBCUniversal Media Group is the television and streaming arm of NBCUniversal, and the direct descendant and successor of the former division NBCUniversal Television Group, which existed from 2004–19.

== History ==
=== NBC Broadcasting ===
In 2006, NBCUniversal sold four stations from its smallest markets. In November 2007, the NBC Owned Television Stations changed its name to NBC Local Media. In March 2008, Local Media decided to focus on growing websites and the top ten market stations, placing WTVJ in Miami and WVIT in Hartford up for sale.

LXTV was acquired in January 2008 by NBC Local Media followed in March by the purchased of Skycastle Entertainment, Local Media's former outside sales and marketing firm. After NBC Weather Plus was shut down in late 2008, WNBC launched a replacement programming of local information, news and lifestyle as NBC New York Nonstop in March 2009 using LXTV programs.

In May 2009, NBC rolled out a tiered affiliation plan. The plan has three levels: Bronze, Silver and Gold. Bronze is the standard existing short term affiliation, programming with ad inventory splits. With the silver plan, the affiliate and network would add working in other media: internet, wireless and video on demand areas with inventory splits, a different financial arrangement and promotion commitments. Gold affiliation agreement is a longer broader partnership in local online media and mobile digital TV with the network representing the gold affiliates in cable and satellite retransmission consent negotiations with the network sharing in the carriage revenue. A NBClocal.com livestyle website would be a part of the silver package. By July 2009, GE has been registering NBCmarket.com domains (like NBCIndianapolis.com) in markets where NBC stations are not NBC owned. NBC Affiliates Board chair Mike Fiorile indicated a preference on behalf of local stations that the local station should own its own brand in the market. Local Newser indicated that this might be attempt by NBC to compete with their local affiliates despite pointing out the NBC local program as a part of its top tier affiliation plans.

On October 24, 2012, NBC Owned Television Stations announced it will relaunch the NBC Nonstop network as Cozi TV, which will feature classic television shows, films and original programming. In July 2013, NBCU placed NBC TV Stations and Telemundo's O&Os stations into a new division, NBCUniversal Owned Television Stations, with New England Cable News being transferred into NBC TV Stations.

=== Broadcast, Cable, Sports and News ===
With Ted Harbert departing as head of NBC Broadcasting in September 2016, Mark Lazarus (as chairman of NBC Broadcasting and Sports) added this group to his responsibility over NBC Sports Group. In January 2019, NBCUniversal was reorganized to make way for their streaming service. Lazarus added NBCUniversal Cable Entertainment Group and NBCUniversal News Group to his portfolio, now as chairman of NBCUniversal Broadcast, Cable, Sports and News (except for NBC Entertainment).

In an April 2020 reorganization, Lazarus was named chairman of NBCUniversal Television and Streaming with the addition of responsibility over NBC Entertainment, Direct-to-Consumer and Digital Enterprises and Telemundo Enterprises. Andrew Lack also exited as chairman of NBCUniversal News Group as he was succeeded by Cesar Conde.

== Units ==
=== NBC Entertainment ===
NBC Entertainment
- Type: Division
- Industry: Television production
- Founded: 1985; 41 years ago
- Headquarters: 30 Rockefeller Plaza, New York City, New York, United States
- Area served: United States
- Parent: RCA (1985–1986); General Electric (1986–1992); NBCUniversal Media Group (1992–present)
- Divisions: NBC

NBC Entertainment is NBCUniversal's development & scheduling arm for the NBC television network. The division includes prime time programming, business affairs, West Coast research, marketing, public relations and network scheduling departments.

==== History ====
In July 2008, Universal Cable Productions was split off from Universal Media Studios and placed into NBCUniversal's NBCU Cable Entertainment division. On Monday, September 12, 2011, Universal Media Studios was renamed to Universal Television.

NBC Entertainment named Paul Telegdy as president of both its alternative and reality TV group and NBC Entertainment, along the formation of Universal Television Alternative Studios by president Meredith Ahr in June 2016. These promotions are part of a push for NBC to create and distribute future reality TV shows. However, late night programming was removed from Teledgy's portfolio, which also included annual specials. On September 24, 2018, Bob Greenblatt left NBC Entertainment's chairman position and was replaced by George Cheeks and Paul Telegdy.

With the reorganization of NBCUniversal in January 2019, Jeff Shell (currently chairman of Universal Filmed Entertainment Group) added NBC Entertainment, Telemundo Enterprises and many international channels to his portfolio, now as chairman of NBCUniversal Film and Entertainment. In October 2019, NBCUniversal Content Studios was formed to house Universal Television and NBC's late night programming, with Cheeks joining from NBC Entertainment.

In an April 2020 reorganization, NBCUniversal Television and Streaming was formed with NBCUniversal Broadcast, Cable, Sports and News with the addition of NBC Entertainment, Direct-to-Consumer and Digital Enterprises and Telemundo Enterprises.

==== Productions ====
- World of Dance (NBC) co-produced with Jennifer Lopez's Nuyorican Productions
- The Wall (NBC) with Glassman Media, SpringHill Entertainment, LeBron James and Chris Hardwick; French version on C8
- The Titan Games (2019) NBC, competition series with Dwayne Johnson
- In Search Of... (History) with exec producer and host Zachary Quinto
- Songland (2019) NBC, songwriting competition format
- Hollywood Game Night
- Making It with Amy Poehler and Nick Offerman
- Menudo: an hour-long “making the band” show

===== Units =====
- NBC

=== NBCUniversal Local ===
NBCUniversal Local
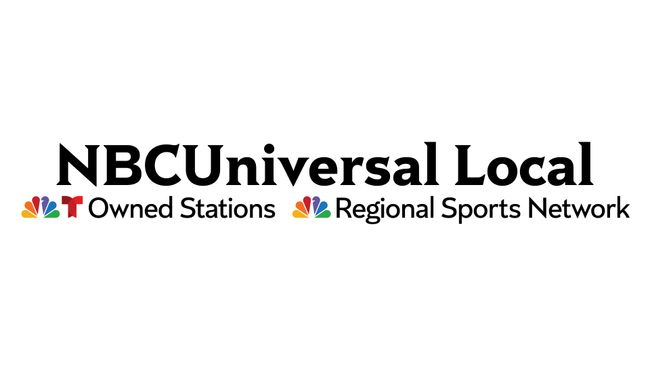
- Type: Division
- Industry: Broadcast television
- Founded: April 29, 2021; 5 years ago
- Headquarters: 30 Rockefeller Plaza, New York City, New York, United States
- Key people: Valari Staab (Chairman)
- Parent: NBCUniversal Media Group
- Divisions: NBC Owned Television Stations; NBC Arthouse; Telemundo Station Group

NBCUniversal Local is a station holding division with two groups, NBC Owned Television Stations and Telemundo Station Group.

==== History ====
In April 2021, NBC Owned Television Stations and Telemundo's O&Os stations merged to form a new division, NBCUniversal Local under NBC TV Station president Valari Staab. NBC Responds/Telemundo Responde units were launched by NBCU Stations in 2014 with a central Consumer Investigative Center based in Dallas. Center and the units investigate consumer rip off with the intent of getting money back for the complainant. By 2019, 18 stations were operating a Responds team with two more started up in 2019 (WTMO Orlando and KTDO El Paso) and 2 more planned in 2020.

With the January 7, 2016, announcement of the new owned and operated NBC Boston station was that the new station would be cluster with the other Boston outlets, New England Cable News and WNEU (Telemundo Boston) under their president Mike St. Peter. In March 2016, NBCU announced the NBCUniversal Boston Media Center, a regional headquarters in Needham Crossing office park, bringing together the cluster from Newton and the NBC Sports Boston cable channel from Burlington together. Opened in January 2020, the center also came equip with a podcast production studio as mainstream media starts pushing into the podcast industry.

In 2017, NBC announced that it was hiring people for KNSD with the intention of launching a new Telemundo O&O station in San Diego, replacing Tijuana, Mexico-licensed station XHAS-TDT (whose affiliation expired at the end of June 2017). The new Telemundo affiliate, branded as "Telemundo 20", launched on July 1 on KNSD's digital 39.20 subchannel. Additionally, KNSD launched TeleXitos, a Spanish equivalent to Cozi TV, on channel 39.21 the same day. On September 12, 2017, NBCUniversal acquired KUAN-LD from NRJ TV, LLC, the owner of KSCI, for $650,000; the sale was completed on December 21, 2017. Concurrently, KUAN entered into a channel-sharing agreement with KNSD. This was done with the separate KUAN-LD transmitter ending service, and 39.20 and 39.21 becoming identified with KUAN-LD instead and re-numbered to KUAN's channel 48.

On September 23, 2019, the station group launched its LX digital news brand for original content. LX was to expand with live-streaming channel and multicast over-the-air network in May 2020.

=== NBCUniversal Syndication Studios ===
NBCUniversal Syndication Studios (formerly NBC Enterprises, Universal Domestic Television, Studios USA Television Distribution LLC, MCA TV and NBCUniversal Television Distribution among other distributor incarnations) is the television distribution arm of NBCUniversal that distributes programs across the nation.

DVD releases for most programs owned by the group are handled by Universal Pictures Home Entertainment through Studio Distribution Services, while certain titles are licensed to other companies such as Shout! Studios, Kino Lorber, and Mill Creek Entertainment.

=== NBCUniversal Global Distribution ===
NBCUniversal Global Distribution, also known as NBCUniversal International Television or NBCUniversal International Television Distribution (formerly Universal Worldwide Television and MCA TV International) is the worldwide television production/distribution arm of NBCUniversal, syndicating NBCUni's programs across the globe. Universal Worldwide Television was formed in 1997 as a result of the break-up of UIP Pay TV. Prior to NUIT's formation, for several years MGM International Television Distribution handled worldwide distribution of shows from NBCUniversal.

MCA TV International handled syndication of MCA TV's programs outside of the United States, but throughout 1987, MCA TV International, alongside Paramount International Television had inked an agreement with Chinese Central Television to offer 100 drama hours, which represented, was the largest license to date, and making it the two Hollywood studios to provide suppliers for Chinese TV, supplanting the previous CBS pact in 1984.

In April 2019, it was announced that Sky Vision would be folded into NBCUniversal Global Distribution, as a result of Comcast's takeover of Sky. On October 1, Sky Vision officially merged with NBCUniversal Global Distribution.

=== NBCUniversal Cable Entertainment ===
NBCUniversal Cable Entertainment
- Formerly: NBCUniversal Cable Entertainment & Cable Studios
- Type: Division
- Industry: Cable
- Founded: August 2, 2004; 22 years ago
- Defunct: October 6, 2025; 13 months ago
- Fate: Spin-off into Versant
- Successor: Versant
- Headquarters: 30 Rockefeller Plaza, New York City, New York, United States
- Key people: Mark Lazarus (chairman, NBCU Media Group); Frances Berwick (chairman, Entertainment Networks); Donna Langley (chairman, NBCUniversal Studio Group)
- Parent: NBCUniversal Media Group
- Divisions: Bravo

NBCUniversal Cable Entertainment, formerly NBCUniversal Cable Entertainment & Cable Studios, is the division of NBCUniversal that oversees all of the conglomerate's non-sports & non-news cable television channels.

==== History ====
===== NBCUniversal Cable Entertainment & Cable Studios =====
In July 2008, Universal Cable Productions was split from Universal Media Studios (UMS) and placed into NBCUniversal's NBCU Cable Entertainment Group division. The unit was placed under the direction of a management team consisting of 5 executives.

===== NBCUniversal Cable Entertainment =====
In February 2013, following the acquisition of the company by Comcast, NBCUniversal merged its two cable divisions, NBCUniversal Cable Entertainment & Cable Studios and NBCUniversal Entertainment & Digital Networks and Integrated Media, into one unit. By April 2013, Comcast Entertainment Studios, or E! Studios, was renamed Wilshire Studios. Jeff Wachtel was transferred from his position as co-president of USA to head of content at Universal Cable Productions.

With the resignation of E! President Suzanne Kolb in September 2014, NBCU Cable announced the formation of Lifestyle Network Group consisting of Bravo, Oxygen, E! Entertainment and Esquire Network. The Group was to be led by Frances Berwick, president of Bravo and Oxygen Media with Esquire Network president Adam Stotsky to take over as general manager of E!

On April 14, 2014, Comcast purchased Lions Gate Entertainment and Sony Pictures Entertainment's stakes in Fearnet, acquiring full ownership of the channel. Comcast plans to fold Fearnet into its existing horror- and thriller-focused network Chiller (owned by the company's NBCUniversal Cable unit), although some of Fearnet's programming may be moved to Syfy.

Hammer ordered a reorganization that creates the Entertainment Networks group with Chiller, Cloo, Syfy, and USA Network by transferring two Syfy executives out and placing USA Network president Chris McCumber in charge of the group as president. Transferred Syfy executives include the executive vice president of original content, who moved to the post of executive vice president of scripted content under the chief content officer of NBCU Cable, and the president of Syfy and Chiller, who moved to president of strategy and commercial growth at NBCU Cable. Sprout was also added to Lifestyle Network. On September 9, 2017, Sprout relaunched as Universal Kids, targeting a wider family audience; the Sprout brand was retained for the network's preschool programming block until January 26, 2018.

The group agreed to purchase a majority stake in Craftsy digital network from equity firms in May 2017. Craftsy was renamed Bluprint with Craftsy.com become its a la carte classes and Craftsy Unlimited service becoming Bluprint, while adding additional lifestyle categories.

In January 2019, NBCUniversal reorganized to make way for their streaming service. Bonnie Hammer was transferred to the new post of chairman at Direct-to-Consumer and Digital Enterprises for NBCUniversal, while the cable group was placed under the NBCUniversal Broadcast, Cable, Sports and News group.

In early 2019, Universal Cable Productions changed its name to Universal Content Productions in order to reflect the move into digital productions. In October 2019, Universal Content Productions was transferred from NBCUniversal Cable Entertainment Group to NBCUniversal Content Studios. Further restructuring placed the two cable networks in April 2020 under NBCU Television and Streaming.

On September 30, 2025, most of the networks in the division, excepting Bravo, were transferred to Versant in advance of the planned spin-off of the company from Comcast.

==== NBCUniversal Cable units ====
- Bravo
- Wilshire Studios, reality studios, formerly E! Studio

===== Former units =====
- Universal Content Productions (2008–2019) formerly Universal Cable Productions (until early 2019), moved to NBCUniversal Content Studios
- Bluprint (May 2017–January 2019), moved to NBCUniversal Direct-to-Consumer and Digital Enterprises, then sold to TN Marketing in July 2020
- G4 (2002–2014; 2021–2022), second G4 network operated by Comcast Spectacor, later closed down on November 18, 2022
- Cloo (2006–2017), closed down with most programming moved to Oxygen
- Universal Kids (2005–2025)

====== Transferred to Versant in 2026 ======
- Oxygen
- Syfy
- USA Network
- E!

=== NBCUniversal Direct-to-Consumer and Digital Enterprises ===
NBCUniversal Direct-to-Consumer and Digital Enterprises
- Formerly: NBCUniversal Entertainment & Digital Networks and Integrated Media
- Type: Division
- Industry: TV, internet
- Founded: January 31, 2006; 20 years ago
- Headquarters: 30 Rockefeller Plaza, New York City, New York, United States
- Key people: Matt Strauss; (chairman); Maggie McLean Suniewick (president, Digital Enterprises)
- Parent: NBCUniversal Media Group

NBCUniversal Direct-to-Consumer and Digital Enterprises, also called Peacock and Digital Enterprises, is a division of NBCUniversal that holds the streaming service and their digital networks and previously held a part of NBCUniversal's cable portfolio as well as Telemundo.

==== History ====
===== Entertainment & Digital Networks and Integrated Media =====
NBCUniversal Entertainment & Digital Networks and Integrated Media was organized in 2006 in the wake of Comcast's NBCUniversal takeover and was headed by Lauren Zalaznick. Their cable channels were transferred to NBCUniversal Cable Entertainment & Cable Studios in 2013 while Telemundo and Mun2 were moved to a new division called NBCUniversal Hispanic Enterprises and Content. The move also created the corporate-level position of executive vice president in charge of digital ventures for Zalaznick, taking the digital networks with her.

===== Digital Enterprises =====
Lauren Zalaznick was appointed to head this division as executive vice president after her previous division was split into two, with most units being merged into NBCUniversal Cable Entertainment & Cable Studios and becoming NBCUniversal Cable Entertainment Group and the rest becoming NBCUniversal Hispanic Enterprises and Content and taking the digital networks and the Integrated Media group with her, including Women At NBCU, Hispanics At NBCU and the NBCU Digital Council. In September 2014, Zalaznick left NBCUniversal and executive VP Cesar Conde took over most of the division. NBCUniversal Consumer Products, headed by Russell Hampton, and Fandango, headed by Paul Yanover, was transferred to Universal Studios under its vice chairman Jeff Shell, while the Integrated Media group, headed by John Shea, was transferred to Linda Yaccarino, chairman of advertising sales and client partnerships.

Evan Shapiro, the group's former pivot president, took over the unit in the new position of executive vice president at Digital Enterprises under Conde, the executive VP of NBCUniversal International Enterprises. NBCUniversal Digital Enterprises hired additional executives in preparation for the roles outside of its first direct-to-consumer services: Patricia Parra Hadden as senior vice president for marketing and Ben McLean for business affairs/development, content licensing, operations and strategy.

In October 2015, Digital Enterprises announced Seeso, a comedy-oriented over-the-top subscription VOD channel, which became a private beta in December and launched in January launch. However, Digital Enterprises closed down Seeso in late 2017.

Maggie McLean Suniewick was named president of NBCUniversal Digital Enterprises in September 2016 when she was hired from her position as executive in charge of NBCUniversal's Symphony initiative. On June 19, 2017, Laura Lee began as executive VP of content, strategy and operations of the enterprise to oversee their recently purchased stake in Snap, Buzz and Vox Media.

===== Direct-to-Consumer and Digital Enterprises =====
In a January 2019 NBCUniversal reorganization, Digital Enterprises was placed under Bonnie Hammer as chairman of NBCU Direct-to-Consumer and Digital Enterprises. The Digital Enterprises group was the initial core of this group, The reorganization announcement indicated that a new streaming service would be formed in the new group. The streaming service was announced on September 17, 2019, as Peacock, which is to be launched in April 2020. In a May 2020 reorganization, the division was placed under NBCUniversal Television and Streaming.

==== Units ====
- Peacock streaming service
- Integrated Media
- Snap (ownership stake)
- Buzz (ownership stake)
- Vox Media (ownership stake)

===== Former units =====
- Television Without Pity
- Seeso (2015–2017) shut down
- Hulu (33% equity; silent partner; sold to The Walt Disney Company)

Transferred to NBCUniversal Hispanic Enterprises and Content

- Telemundo (2011–2013)
- Mun2 (2011–2013)

Transferred to NBCUniversal Cable Entertainment Group:

- Bravo (2011–2013)
- Oxygen (2011–2013)
- Sprout (2011–2013)
- TV One (2011–2013) joint venture

Transferred to Versant in 2026:

- Fandango (75% with Warner Bros. Discovery)
  - Fandango
  - Fandango at Home
  - INDY Cinema Group
  - MovieTickets.com
  - Rotten Tomatoes
    - Rotten Tomatoes Movieclips

=== NBCUniversal Telemundo Enterprises ===
NBCUniversal Telemundo Enterprises
- Formerly: NBCUniversal Hispanic Enterprises and Content; NBCUniversal Hispanic Group
- Type: Division
- Industry: Cable
- Predecessor: NBCUniversal Entertainment & Digital Networks and Integrated Media; Telemundo Communications Group
- Founded: February 4, 2013; 13 years ago
- Headquarters: 30 Rockefeller Plaza, New York City, United States
- Key people: Luis Fernández (chairman)
- Parent: NBCUniversal Media Group
- Divisions: Telemundo; Universo; Telemundo of Puerto Rico Studios; Telemundo Studios; Telemundo Internacional; TeleXitos; Telemundo Films

NBCUniversal Telemundo Enterprises, formerly NBCUniversal Hispanic Enterprises and Content & NBCUniversal Hispanic Group, is the Hispanic culture outlet company and division of NBCUniversal.

NBCUniversal Hispanic Enterprises and Content was spun off from NBCUniversal Entertainment & Digital Networks and Integrated Media, taking Telemundo and Mun2 while most of the said unit was merged into NBCUniversal Cable Entertainment Group. Joe Uva was appointed as chairman of the unit starting April 3, 2013.

On December 24, 2014, NBCUniversal announced that it would rebrand mun2 as NBC Universo on February 1, 2015, to coincide with the network's Spanish-language broadcast of Super Bowl XLIX.

NBCUniversal Hispanic Group rolled out 1,000 hours of new programming for its two channels at Upfronts in May 2015. They also launched CultureFirst, an advertising initiative that helps advertisers create a full plan to reach out to Latinos, and co-programming opportunities that allows advertisers to promote content across NBC channels. NBC Deportes, a dedicated Hispanic sports production unit, was also announced by Chairman Joe Uva and Chairman Mark Lazarus of NBC Sports Group.

On October 12, 2015, NBCUniversal Hispanic Group was renamed NBCUniversal Telemundo Enterprises with Cesar Conde taking over as chairman from Joe Uva. Conde was already chairman of NBCUniversal International Enterprises. Uva would continue to oversee the move of NBC Deportes to the NBC Sports Group facility in Stamford, Connecticut. In a January 2019 NBCUniversal reorganization, Telemundo Enterprises was placed under Jeff Shell, the chairman of NBCUniversal Film and Entertainment.

In a May 2020 reorganization, the division was placed under NBCUniversal Television and Streaming. At that time it was announced Conde would move over to head up NBCUniversal News Group as chairman.

==== Units ====
- Telemundo
- Universo
- TeleXitos

== Related units ==
=== Universal Studio Group ===
Universal Studio Group
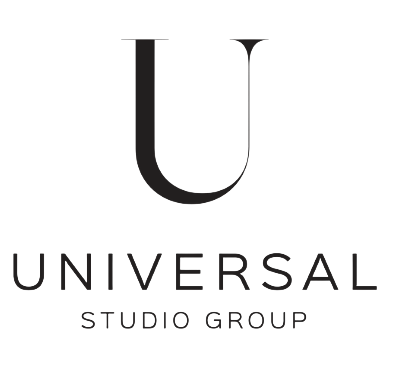
- Formerly: NBCUniversal Content Studios
- Type: Division
- Industry: Television
- Founded: October 2019; 7 years ago
- Headquarters: 10 Universal City Plaza, Universal City, California, United States
- Area served: United States
- Key people: Pearlena Igbokwe (chairman)
- Parent: NBCUniversal
- Divisions: Universal Television; Universal Global Television; Universal Television Alternative Studio; USG Audio; Universal Content Productions (2019-2026); Universal International Studios (2019-2026)

Universal Studio Group, formerly NBCUniversal Content Studios, was formed in October 2019, with Bonnie Hammer (formerly a chairman of NBCU Direct-to-Consumer and Digital Enterprises) as chairwoman and George Cheeks (co-chairman of NBC Entertainment) as vice chairman. This unit consists of Universal Television and Universal Global Television. They also formerly owned Universal Content Productions and Universal International Studios until they merged into Universal Global Television. Cheeks would also retain NBC's late night programming.

The Content Studios made its first overall deal worth nine-figure with Seth MacFarlane's Fuzzy Door production company in January 2020. Universal Content Productions was assigned the lead with Fuzzy Door for television with NBCU outlets including the Peacock streaming service and outside outlet. Vice-chairman Cheeks in mid-January 2020 leaves the studio. It is announced that Pearlena Igbowke unveiled the group. A new overall deal with Jordan Peele and his Monkeypaw Productions company has been signed more recently.

Universal Content Productions launched UCP Audio, a podcast studio, in 2019. The studio was renamed USG Audio in 2021. You Didn't See Nothin, a co-production with the Invisible Institute, won a Peabody Award in 2023.

=== NBCUniversal News Group ===
NBCUniversal News Group
- Type: Division
- Industry: Television
- Genre: News
- Founded: July 19, 2012; 14 years ago
- Area served: Worldwide
- Key people: Cesar Conde (chairman, News Group); Rebecca Blumenstein (president, NBC News)
- Production output: News TV shows
- Parent: NBCUniversal (Comcast)
- Divisions: NBC News; NBC News NOW; Noticias Telemundo; NBC Owned Television Stations; NBCUniversal Telemundo Enterprises; NBC Sports Regional Networks

NBCUniversal News Group is the news division of NBCUniversal, composed of the NBC News, NBC News NOW, CNBC-e, & Noticias Telemundo units, that was created on July 19, 2012, under chairwoman Pat Fili-Krushel. In April 2015, Andrew Lack took over as CEO of the group, with CNBC being moved to a direct unit reporting to NBCUniversal CEO. Lack was appointed to fix the division after flagging ratings and the Brian Williams embellishment scandal.

In February 2017, the group purchased a 25% stake in Euronews for $30 million to increase its international reach. NBC News president Deborah Turness was appointed to lead international operations, with Noah Oppenheim, who oversaw Today, replacing her at NBC News. Euronews, integrated with NBC News, would be renamed Euronews NBC and be headed up by Turness.

In January 2017, Megyn Kelly agreed to leave Fox News for a "triple role" at NBC News in which she would anchor and host her own daytime program and in-depth Sunday night news show, along with taking part in the network's political and major news event coverage. However, the division was not able to make Kelly's show a success.

Lack moved the division more into the digital space with new content for Snapchat, Quibi and an in-house streaming-video outlet The division's streaming service, NBC News Signal, was up and running by October 24, 2018, with a mid-2019 launch.

In April 2019, Comcast CEO Brian Roberts stated that the company was exploring the establishment of a "global" news channel as a joint venture between Sky News and NBC News. NBC Sky World News, an English language worldwide news service in conjunction with Sky News, was announced to be launched in mid-2020 only to be postponed on April 2, 2020, due to the COVID-19 pandemic in the United States. On April 20, 2020, it was reported that NBCUniversal had sold its stake in Euronews to Media Globe Networks in order to prioritize the proposed international news channel. However, the proposed new service was scrapped in August 2020, resulting in layoffs of 60 employees.

On May 4, 2020, NBCUniversal announced that Andrew Lack stepped down and would be leaving the company at the end of May 2020. CNBC is rejoining the News Group under the new chairman of Cesar Conde, previously NBCUniversal International Group & Telemundo Enterprises Chairman.

On October 6, 2025, Versant began operating MSNBC and CNBC separately from the NBCUniversal News Group in advance of that company being spun off from Comcast; this process included changing the name of MSNBC to MS NOW.
