= Universal Television =

American television production company

Universal Television LLC
- Logo used since 2011
- Formerly: NBC Universal Television Studio (2004–2007); Universal Media Studios (2007–2011)
- Type: Division
- Industry: Television
- Predecessors: Revue Studios; Universal Television (first incarnation); NBC Studios; Studios USA Television; PolyGram Television; USA Cable Entertainment; MCA Television Entertainment
- Founded: 2004; 22 years ago
- Headquarters: 10 Universal City Plaza, Universal City, California, United States
- Key people: Erin Underhill (president)
- Services: Television production
- Parent: NBCUniversal Media Group (2004–2019); Universal Studio Group (2019–present)
- Divisions: SNL Studios; EMKA, Ltd.; Open 4 Business Productions
- Website: Official website

Universal Television LLC, abbreviated as UTV, is an American television production company and the television studio arm of NBC, established in 2004 under the name NBC Universal Television Studio, as a renaming of Universal Network Television. The flagship television division of the Universal Studio Group division of NBCUniversal, a subsidiary of Comcast, it serves as the network television production arm of NBC; a predecessor of the company, NBC Studios, previously assumed such functions, and a substantial portion of the company's shows air on the network.

It is also known as Open 4 Business Productions, founded in 2000, in copyright in certain television series produced by them since 2009. The NBC Universal Television Studio was succeeded by Universal Media Studios in 2007 and renamed to its current name on September 12, 2011.

== History ==
Evolution of Comcast
- 1909: Independent Moving Pictures was founded by Carl Laemmle as the predecessor to Universal
- 1912: Universal Studios Hollywood was founded after Independent Moving merged with several smaller film studios
- 1915: Universal City, California, was established as the entertainment district for the Universal Studios Lot.
- 1924: MCA Inc. was founded by Jules Stein as a talent agency to book musicians
- 1926: RCA Corporation launched the NBC Radio Network, and by 1939, NBC began broadcasting on television.
- 1934: Decca Records America was established and would later grow to become Universal Music Group
- 1946: William Goetz and Leo Spitz began managing Universal Pictures, after merging International Pictures
- 1952: Decca Records America acquired a controlling stake in Universal Pictures
- 1958: MCA acquired the Universal Studios film lot and later purchased Decca Records America, and Universal Pictures in 1962
- 1963: Comcast was founded as American Cable Systems by Ralph J. Roberts
- 1973: Decca Records America is retired as a brand and renamed to MCA Records
- 1986: General Electric acquired RCA Corp and dissolved the company while retaining ownership of NBC
- 1990: Panasonic acquired a Controlling interest in MCA, but sold it to Seagram within five years after growing costs
- 1998: MCA Records acquired Polygram N.V. from Philips and was renamed to Universal Music Group
- 2000: Seagram Entertainment was sold to Vivendi and merged with StudioCanal to become Vivendi Universal
- 2002: NBC acquired Telemundo while Comcast acquired AT&T Broadband
- 2004: Vivendi Universal was consolidated with General Electric's wholly owned NBC to form NBCUniversal, while Universal Music Group was separated
- 2013: Comcast closed its acquisition of NBCUniversal from General Electric
- 2018: Sky Group was acquired from 21st Century Fox after a bidding war
- 2020: Peacock was launched
- 2026: Majority of NBCU's cable networks were spun off into another company named Versant, while Comcast later announced it would spin-off NBCUniversal and Sky into a separate company

=== Revue Studios ===
Revue Studios
- Formerly: Revue Productions Inc. (1943–1959)
- Type: Subsidiary
- Founded: 1943; 83 years ago (Original) 2025; 1 year ago (Revival)
- Founder: Music Corporation of America
- Defunct: 1963; 63 years ago (Original)
- Fate: Renamed Universal Television
- Successor: Universal Television; Revue Studios (revival)
- Parent: MCA
- Divisions: EMKA, Ltd.

Revue Studios (first known as Revue Productions Inc.) was founded in 1943 by MCA to produce live radio shows; it also produced "Stage Door Canteen" live events for the United Service Organizations (USO) during World War II until it ended in 1945. Revue was re-launched as MCA's television production subsidiary in 1950. The partnership of NBC and Revue extends as far back as September 6, 1950, with the television broadcast of the anthology series Stars Over Hollywood (also known as Armour Theatre), based on radio's Stars over Hollywood.

During the early years of television, Revue was responsible for producing and distributing many television programs. These included Leave It to Beaver, which ran for only one season on CBS before going to ABC from 1958 until 1963. In addition, Revue also made Alan Hale Jr.'s Biff Baker, U.S.A. (1952–1953) and all three of Rod Cameron's syndicated series, City Detective (1953–1955), State Trooper (1956–1959), and Coronado 9 (1960–1961) and the Bill Williams Western series, The Adventures of Kit Carson (1951–1955). It produced Bachelor Father (1957–1962), for "Bachelor Productions", Edmond O'Brien's syndicated crime film Johnny Midnight, based on a fictitious New York City actor-turned-private investigator.

Revue also produced the 52-episode Crusader, the first Brian Keith series, which aired on CBS from 1955 to 1956. Another western produced by Revue and starring Audie Murphy was Whispering Smith, which aired on NBC in 1961 and was based on the 1948 Alan Ladd movie of the same name. Leave It to Beaver was produced first by George Gobel's Gomalco Productions, then by Kayro Productions on a back lot at Revue Studios from 1958 to 1963. The ABC sitcom McHale's Navy was also produced by Revue from 1962 to 1966.

In December 1958, MCA/Revue purchased Universal Studios' 367-acre backlot to produce television series, then leased it back to Universal for a million dollars a year for a decade. The backlot was renamed Revue Studios, which became the name of the company in 1959. In 1960, a jingle composed by Juan García Esquivel and Stanley Wilson was introduced at the end of its productions, which was used in some form until the 1980s.

Revue produced later seasons of The Jack Benny Program for CBS and NBC and in co-operation with Jack Benny's J and M Productions (later known as JaM Productions and JaMco Productions), Checkmate (also co-produced by Jack Benny), General Electric Theater and Alfred Hitchcock Presents for CBS, Studio 57 for DuMont Television Network, and westerns such as Tales of Wells Fargo, The Tall Man, The Restless Gun and Laramie for NBC, as well as Wagon Train for NBC and ABC. The first two seasons of NBC's The Virginian, based on a film released originally by Paramount Pictures, whose pre-1950 theatrical sound feature film library was sold to MCA in 1958. Wagon Train was the only Revue-produced TV show to finish an American television season in first place.

In 1962, following its merger with Decca Records, the then-parent of Universal Pictures, the studio backlot name was changed back to Universal. In 1963, MCA formed Universal City Studios to merge the motion picture and television arms of Universal Pictures and Revue Studios, and Revue was officially renamed Universal Television.

On July 17, 2025, Revue Studios was brought back as an independent content studio. Andrew Singer founded the revived company, which was backed by Casey Wasserman, Lew's grandson.

=== Universal Television (original) ===
Universal Television
- Formerly: Universal Studios (1964–1973)
- Type: Division
- Predecessor: Revue Studios
- Founded: 1963; 63 years ago
- Defunct: 1998; 28 years ago
- Fate: Sold to Barry Diller and renamed to Studios USA Television
- Successor: Studios USA Television
- Parent: MCA (1963–1996); Universal Studios, Inc. (1996–1998)
- Divisions: EMKA, Ltd.

In 1962, MCA acquired Decca Records, including the film studio Universal-International Pictures (later integrated into Universal Pictures). The following year, in 1963, Revue Studios was reincorporated as the original iteration of Universal Television. Since then, they have made many contributions to television programming, including the production of the first television film (See How They Run from 1964), the first wheel series (The Name of the Game from 1968), the first rotating series with an umbrella title (1969's The Bold Ones) and the first two-part television movie (Vanished from 1971). Universal Television (also commonly known as MCA/Universal) also co-produced many shows with Jack Webb's Mark VII Limited, such as Emergency!, Adam-12 and a revival of the 1951 series Dragnet.

In 1967, Grant Tinker, formerly employee of NBC was hired to join the studio. He held the position for two years, until he left in 1969 to join 20th Century-Fox Television, and later that year, had to start MTM Enterprises. He subsequently left Fox in 1971 due to conflicts with running MTM.

During the 1970s and 1980s, Universal Television produced shows such as Baretta, The Rockford Files, Murder, She Wrote, Miami Vice, The Equalizer, The Incredible Hulk, Battlestar Galactica, Buck Rogers in the 25th Century, Knight Rider, The A-Team, Simon & Simon and Magnum, P.I., many of which received critical acclaim and several TV movie spin-offs after their cancellations.

The company hit major setbacks in the late 1970s and early 1980s when large-profile producer Stephen J. Cannell left Universal to form his independent production company, and another large-profile producer Glen A. Larson had also left Universal to join 20th Century Fox Television. Around the same time, in 1981, supervising producer Jo Swerling Jr. and writer Frank Lupo had left Universal to join Stephen J. Cannell's production company. Both of its 1980s massive hit series for NBC, Knight Rider and The A-Team were both conceived to fulfill his contractual obligations with respective creators Glen A. Larson and Stephen J. Cannell as his last shows working for Universal before he left the company.

In 1980, Bud Austin has received a production contract with Universal Television to produce television series. One of the more notable contracts was writer/producer Dick Wolf, whose Universal association began in 1986 with Miami Vice, then writing for several more shows before creating the hit Law & Order franchise. In 1987, Universal Television, which by then, was the leading producers in prime time television programming, decided to have six pilots committed for network production value, plus three series for the 1987–88 season, which included development deals with people who already contracted with Universal.

In 1990, MCA/Universal Television began the Law & Order franchise. In 1991, Tom Thayer was named president of the Universal Television arm. In 1993, former Warner Bros. Television senior vice president of production employee Steven J. Papazian joined Universal Television as vice president of production. In 1992, Universal Television signed a deal with several newer talent, plus some returning and existing talent that were offered at the studio, including Ivan Reitman, David Burke, John Leekley and R.J. Stewart. In 1993, St. Clare Entertainment, a company owned by John Landis had reupped its contract at both MCA TV, MTE and Universal Television, three of the encompassing TV units of MCA via the MCA TV Group. In 1994, Universal Television made a financing partnership with ABC to help them fund the show Blue Skies.

In 1996, MCA was reincorporated as Universal Studios. Around the same time, Universal was acquired by Joseph A. Seagram and Sons and later acquired the Multimedia Entertainment and USA Network. Also that year, Universal Television collaborated with Warner Bros. Television to develop the series Spy Game for ABC, with Universal alumnus Sam Raimi and Robert Tapert of Renaissance Pictures, and Warner alumnus John McNamara producing the series, but it didn't last long, as it only lasted one season on the air.

Universal purchased a 50% stake of Brillstein-Grey Entertainment in 1996 for $75 to $100 million, and included distribution rights to then-new BGE programming such as Alright Already, and did not include older BGE programs that was grandfathered by the Columbia TriStar distribution agreement, such as The Larry Sanders Show for HBO, NewsRadio and Just Shoot Me! for NBC, and The Steve Harvey Show for The WB. They considered buying the other 50% after selling its own television unit to Barry Diller in 1998. Universal sold its stake in BGE in 1999 and BGE was renamed as Brad Grey Television, though Universal continued to co-produce Just Shoot Me! and The Steve Harvey Show until their cancellations.

EMKA, Ltd. is the holding company responsible for a majority of the pre-1950 Paramount Pictures sound library. As an official part of the Universal Pictures library, they are part of the company's television unit, Universal Television.

=== MCA Television Entertainment ===
Studios USA Pictures
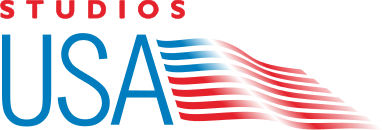
- Formerly: MCA Television Entertainment (1988–1996); Universal Television Entertainment (1996–1998)
- Type: Division
- Founded: 1988; 38 years ago
- Defunct: 1999; 27 years ago
- Fate: Merged with and folded into USA Cable Entertainment
- Successor: USA Cable Entertainment
- Parent: Universal Television (1989–1998); Studios USA Television (1998–1999)

During the 1970s and 1980s, MCA TV, the syndication company, had a production shop that produced shows like Probe, which aired on ABC.

MCA Television Entertainment (or MTE for short) was founded in 1988 as the telemovie and cable division of Universal Television. The company's intent was primarily to produce television movies for USA Network, and one of the network's primary suppliers, along with Paramount-owned Wilshire Court Productions.

It primarily dealt with made-for-TV movies, and television shows like Dream On that were made for cable networks like HBO. It was also a producer of first-run syndication programming for the Hollywood Premiere Network, which was distributed by MCA's own syndication arm MCA TV, as well as KCOP-TV in Los Angeles and WWOR-TV in New York, such as They Came from Outer Space, Shades of L.A. and She-Wolf of London, but it only lasted one season from 1990 to 1991, but it didn't last long.

In 1990, Michael Landsbury was named vice president of series programs, Angela Mancuso as vice president of production, and Michael Houbrick was named assistant director of publicity, at the studio.

One of the most notable clients of MTE was Papazian-Hirsch Entertainment, who produced a bulk of these television movies and series for the studio.

In 1996, it was renamed as Universal Television Entertainment (or UTE for short) to align with MCA's rebranding as Universal Studios. It was eventually renamed Studios USA Pictures in 1998, and merged into USA Cable Entertainment in 1999. MCA Television Entertainment was also a collective branding for their units owned and operated by MCA, and it absorbed Universal Family Entertainment and Universal Cartoon Studios in 1996.

=== Studios USA Television ===
Studios USA Television
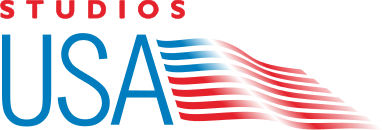
- Formerly: USA Networks Studios (1998)
- Type: Division
- Predecessor: The first incarnation of Universal Television
- Founded: 1998; 28 years ago
- Defunct: 2002; 24 years ago
- Fate: Acquired by Vivendi Universal and merged with Universal Studios Network Programming to form Universal Network Television
- Successor: Universal Network Television
- Parent: USA Networks Inc.
- Divisions: Studios USA Network Television; Studios USA Television Distribution; USA Cable Entertainment

USA Networks Inc. was founded by Barry Diller when he bought Universal's major television assets in February 1998, as a renaming of the original incarnation of the Universal Television studio. Among its assets were the USA Network and Sci-Fi Network cable channels along with series such as Law & Order. Additionally, the company would own the HSN, the Ticketmaster Group and several television stations. Universal Television's production and distribution unit was renamed Studios USA. Universal held on to its 50% share of Brillstein-Grey Entertainment, PolyGram's international channels and the rights to its television library while signing a long-term domestic sales deal with Studios USA for the library. Universal got a 45% share in USA Networks Inc. Greg Meidel initially resigned and was rehired as chairman and CEO of Studios USA, only to leave in June 1998.

In 1999, USA Networks formed its own film and home media divisions when they acquired October Films and several production and distribution assets of PolyGram Filmed Entertainment for $200 million. Most of the new shows produced under the Studios USA name bombed after only one or two seasons; only Law & Order: Special Victims Unit, Law & Order: Criminal Intent and The District were deemed to be big hits. Although the latter two were cancelled, in 2011 and 2004 respectively, the former is still an ongoing show.

In 2000, Clyde Phillips has signed an overall deal with the studio to develop scripts made for the studio.

On December 17, 2001, Vivendi Universal agreed to acquire USA's entertainment assets for an estimated $10.3 billion; the transaction closed on May 8, 2002. Under the deal, Barry Diller became chairman of Vivendi Universal Entertainment. USA Networks is currently known as IAC. Shortly afterwards, Studios USA Television was merged with Universal Studios Network Television, producers of NBC's sitcom Just Shoot Me! to form Universal Network Television.

=== PolyGram Television/Universal Network Television ===
Universal Network Television
- Formerly: PolyGram Television (1997–1999); Universal Studios Network Programming (1999–2002)
- Type: Division
- Predecessor: ITC Entertainment; Studios USA Television
- Founded: March 5, 1997; 29 years ago (as PolyGram Television)
- Defunct: 2004; 22 years ago
- Fate: Merged with NBC Studios to form NBC Universal Television Studio
- Successor: NBC Universal Television Studio
- Parent: PolyGram Filmed Entertainment (1997–1999); Vivendi Universal (1999–2004)

In 1997, PolyGram created not only its syndication unit, but a network unit for long-form television movies and drama series, which was a rebranding from the former UK-based ITC Entertainment television division of PolyGram. It was headed up by Bob Sanitsky, who headed the combined syndication and network divisions. In 1998, it signed a deal with Meg Ryan and her Prufock Pictures to set up her projects at the studio.

In early 1999, shortly after Seagram and Universal completed their deal to acquire PolyGram, PolyGram Television was absorbed into Universal's TV and Networks division (which consisted of Universal's international television operations). Universal would sell the ITC film and television library to Carlton Communications, and the pre-1996 film library to Metro-Goldwyn-Mayer (MGM). Shortly afterwards, PolyGram Television was then retained by Universal, opting Bob Sanitsky out of the unit. Universal however then launched Universal Studios Network Programming to inherit the Brillstein-Grey productions, such as the upcoming Work with Me, and the existing Brillstein-Grey shows Just Shoot Me! and The Steve Harvey Show. In 2001, NBC had an option agreement with Universal Network Television to keep Just Shoot Me! on the air to 2003.

In June 2002, Universal Studios Network Television was relaunched, replacing Studios USA Network Television after its acquisition by Universal. In 2003, writer John Ridley signed a deal with the studio. Also that year, longtime Universal executives Sarah Timberman and Carl Beverly left the studio to start out 25C Productions, a production company affiliated with Warner Bros. Television. After Vivendi Universal was acquired by GE and merged with NBC in 2004, NBC Universal absorbed NBC Studios and USA Cable Entertainment into the studio and renamed the latter as NBC Universal Television Studio and its syndication and distribution arm as NBC Universal Television Distribution.

=== USA Cable Entertainment ===
USA Cable Entertainment
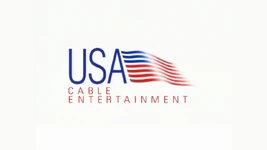
- Formerly: USA Network Productions (1980–1996, 1999); USA Studios (1996–1999)
- Type: Division
- Predecessor: Studios USA Pictures
- Founded: 1980; 46 years ago
- Defunct: 2004; 22 years ago
- Fate: Folded into Universal Network Television
- Successor: Universal Television; Universal Content Productions
- Parent: USA Network (1980–1999); Studios USA Television (1999–2002); Universal Studios, Inc. (2002–2004)

The origins of USA Cable Entertainment are traced back to the 1980s when it was founded as USA Network Productions to produce content for the USA Networks. In 1996, it was rebranded to USA Studios, and in 1999 to USA Networks Productions, and later on reincorporated as USA Cable Entertainment on December 24, 1999. Stephen Chao was named as the company's president in 2000.

The company was best known for producing Monk and the 2003 miniseries Battlestar Galactica, which spawned a reboot in 2004. The same year, The Hollywood Reporter revealed that NBC Universal, acquired by Comcast in 2011, folded USA Cable Entertainment into Universal Network Television with the latter being renamed to NBC Universal Television Studio. In 2008, the studio, then renamed Universal Media Studios, spun off its cable production division, including shows previously produced under the USA Cable Entertainment name, to Universal Cable Productions (now Universal Content Productions).

=== NBC Studios ===
NBC Studios, Inc.
- Formerly: NBC Television Network (1947–1963); NBC Productions (1963–1996)
- Type: Division
- Founded: 1947; 79 years ago
- Founder: RCA
- Defunct: 2004; 22 years ago
- Fate: Folded into Universal Network Television
- Successor: Universal Television
- Parent: National Broadcasting Company, Inc.

NBC's in-house production division, commonly referred to as "NBC Television Network", was founded in 1947 by RCA (NBC's former parent company). One of its first productions was the children's television program Howdy Doody.

In 1955, NBC acquired production company Kagran Corporation, and by 1956, changed its company name to California National Productions (CNP) and became its syndication and merchandising division. The company also brought several NBC-aired programs, like The Adventures of Hiram Holliday and The Lawless Years, as well as non-NBC programs like The Silent Service and Philip Marlowe, but none of them were successful. The company's first hit was the television show Bonanza, which aired from 1959 to 1973 on the NBC television network. Its follow-up project that was produced independently was Outlaws, a western from 1960 to 1962. The third independently produced NBC show, The Americans, which aired only in 1961, lasted a few episodes, and bombed after only one season.

In 1961, NBC replaced CNP as its syndication division with NBC Films. Two years later, in 1963, NBC launched its production arm, NBC Productions, which succeeded NBC Television Network, to continue producing its existing show Bonanza, and develop newer projects for the network. NBC developed and produced several shows internally like Kentucky Jones, Captain Nice and T.H.E. Cat. By 1966, the company had output talent deals with Sheldon Leonard, Bob Finkel, Norman Felton and David Dortort. The next big project was The High Chaparral, which was a hit among viewers throughout its four-season run, only to be axed in 1971 due to the rural purge. Throughout its partnership with Sheldon Leonard, they produced three shows Accidental Family, My Friend Tony and My World and Welcome to It, but none of them were successful.

In 1971, NBC spun off NBC Films and sold it to National Telefilm Associates (which was itself later sold to Worldvision Enterprises) due to the 1970 fin-syn rules initiated by the Nixon administration, while programs from NBC News continued to be distributed internationally by NBC Enterprises for $7.5 million. In 1974, NBC produced its next big hit Little House on the Prairie.

In the 1980s, NBC produced Punky Brewster, which was popular among viewers. NBC's production output was primarily on television movies and miniseries. NBC's other television series output were Sara and Roomies; both of them were unsuccessful. In 1985, Michael Filerman through his Michael Filerman Productions company signed a deal with NBC Productions to develop long-form telemovies and miniseries, as well as television series. In the late 1980s, NBC Productions attempted to enter the film business, but it was proven unsuccessful, after the failure of the film Codename: Emerald. In 1987, NBC Productions provided funding for a feature film that starred Cassandra Peterson as her Elvira character, which raised $5–6 million by NBC to fund the film. In 1988, NBC started a deal with Peter Engel that resulted in the creation of Good Morning, Miss Bliss and eventually producing a number of teen shows.

In early 1990, NBC had struck a development deal with musician/producer Quincy Jones and his Quincy Jones Entertainment company. Also the same year, NBC signed a deal with Jay Tarses for his production company. By 1990, NBC returned to producing hit programs with the sitcom The Fresh Prince of Bel-Air, which starred Will Smith, in one of his first television roles. Also that same year, NBC Productions partnered with Group W Productions to develop a syndicated program House Party. In 1991, NBC produced another syndicated show, this time, out of the WMAQ-TV studios, Johnny B...On the Loose, in partnership with Viacom Enterprises.

In 1993, Perry Simon left NBC to start his own production company with a non-exclusive production agreement. In 1995, NBC launched a partnership with television director James Burrows to create 3 Sisters Entertainment, who produced series for the network. Out of these five, the most successful out of the venture were Will & Grace and Caroline in the City (co-produced and owned by CBS Productions). Later that year, NBC Productions was however folded into NBC's entertainment division.

In 1996, the company was renamed NBC Studios. The company had returned to producing hit programs like The Pretender, Profiler, Providence, Ed, Las Vegas and Crossing Jordan. In 1997, NBC Studios, Paramount Pictures, and Saturday Night Live creator and producer Lorne Michaels launched a joint venture named SNL Studios, which would produce future episodes of Saturday Night Live in association with Broadway Video (also owned by Michaels), as well as movies featuring Saturday Night Live sketch characters.

In 2004, NBC Studios was merged with Universal Network Television and USA Cable Entertainment to form NBC Universal Television Studio.

The current CBS broadcast syndication arm, CBS Media Ventures, through Spelling Television, currently distributes most of NBC's pre-1973 series, with the exception of non-public domain episodes of Howdy Doody and several episodes of the game show You Bet Your Life by Buddy Hackett and non-public domain episodes by Groucho Marx, which are owned by NBCUniversal; many other NBC-produced programs from before 1973 are in the public domain. Most NBC programs post-1973 are distributed by NBCUniversal Syndication Studios in the United States and MGM Worldwide Television Distribution outside of the United States.

=== 2004–present ===
Shortly after NBC and Universal merged in 2004, the company absorbed the television production and distribution arms of Universal Television (Universal Network Television, Universal Domestic Television and USA Cable Entertainment), NBC's television production arm, NBC Studios, and its distributor, NBC Enterprises and renamed the American studio as NBC Universal Television Studio and its syndication division as NBC Universal Television Distribution. On June 14, 2007, NBC Universal Television Studio was renamed Universal Media Studios (UMS) as the unit would be also developing entertainment for the web. After ending entertainment development for the web, it was changed back to simply Universal Television on September 12, 2011 and a new logo was introduced. On August 10, 2026, Universal Television Entertainment, the same name that was used by what was once MCA Television Entertainment from 1996 to 1998 prior to the USA Networks sale, was revealed via Instagram, and despite the corporate brand, Universal Television continued to be used as of 2026.

On July 21, 2009, Universal Cable Productions was split off from UMS and placed into NBCUniversal Cable Entertainment Group division. In October 2019, Universal Television was transferred from NBC Entertainment to NBCUniversal Content Studios.

== Universal Television Alternative Studio ==
Universal Television Alternative Studio
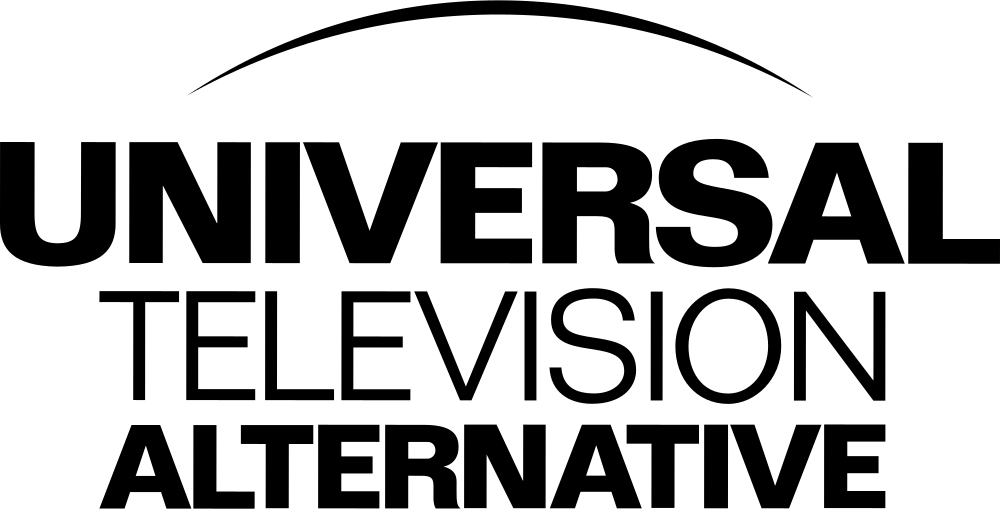
- Type: Division
- Founded: June 2016; 10 years ago
- Parent: Universal Television (2016–2020); Universal Studio Group (2020–present)
- Divisions: Universal Television Alternative Studio UK

Universal Television Alternative Studio or Universal Television Alternative (according to the company's logo) is an American television production company launched in June 2016, formerly part of Universal Television, and since 2020 a unit of Universal Studio Group. The unit reports to Universal Studio Group chairman Pearlena Igbokwe.

The studio was founded in June 2016 under president Meredith Ahr. In July 2016, the studio's first program, World of Dance, was announced by NBC. The studio sold its first show to another channel (In Search Of... to History).

The studio, as did Universal TV, signed a first-look agreement with Chelsea Handler in March 2018. Both production units signed that same year in August an overall agreement with Eddie Schmidt.

In November 2018, Ahr became president of alternative and reality group, NBC Entertainment. Ahr was replaced as the studio's president in August 2019 by Toby Gorman, last the interim CEO of Magical Elves. From Endemol Shine North America, Georgie Hurford-Jones was hired in December 2019 as executive vice president of current programming.

Mario Lopez moved from hosting Extra to NBCUniversal's Access Hollywood in July 2019 with production deal with Universal TV and Universal TV Alternative Studio. His first project, Menudo, an hour-long competition show, under the deal was announced to be in development in April 2020.

== Filmography ==
Notable programs produced or distributed by UTV include The Office, Friday Night Lights, Law & Order, House, 30 Rock, Will & Grace, Parks and Recreation, Community, Brooklyn Nine-Nine, The Blacklist, Chicago, Parenthood, Unbreakable Kimmy Schmidt, Superstore, The Good Place, Never Have I Ever, Ted Lasso, Hacks, The Gilded Age, and many others.
