= Raymond E. Peters =

American judge (1903-1973)

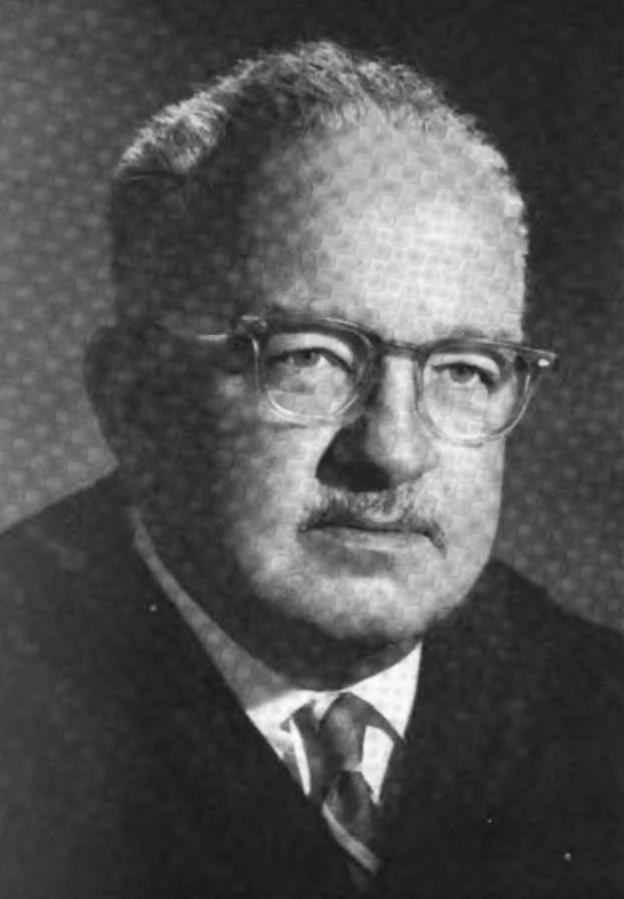
- Peters c. 1963

Associate Justice of the Supreme Court of California
- In office March 26, 1959 – January 2, 1973
- Appointed by: Pat Brown
- Preceded by: Jesse W. Carter
- Succeeded by: William P. Clark Jr.

Presiding Justice of the California Court of Appeal, First District, Division One
- In office June 5, 1939 – March 25, 1959
- Appointed by: Culbert Olson
- Preceded by: John F. Tyler
- Succeeded by: Absalom Francis Brown

Personal details
- Born: April 17, 1903 Oakland, California, U.S.
- Died: January 2, 1973 (aged 69) Berkeley, California, U.S.
- Spouse: Marion Estabrook
- Education: University of California, Berkeley, School of Law (LLB)

Raymond Elmer Peters (April 17, 1903 – January 2, 1973) was an Associate Justice of the Supreme Court of California from March 26, 1959 to January 2, 1973.

== Biography ==
Peters was born in Oakland on April 17, 1903, and educated in the public schools. After high school, he continued his education at the University of California, Berkeley School of Law, and graduated with an LL.B. degree.

In 1930, Peters became Chief Law Secretary of the California Supreme Court. In 1939, Governor Culbert Olson appointed Peters the Presiding Justice of the then District Court of Appeal, First District, Division One, replacing John F. Tyler. In December 1940, Peters was retained by the voters in the election. In November 1948, he was president of the conference of California judges, and led a study on a Code of Conduct for judicial proceedings. In February 1949, Chief Justice Phil S. Gibson appointed Peters to a two-year term on the State Judicial Council. His notable cases on the appellate bench include a September 1958 decision holding San Benito County's "right to work" ordinance to be "unconstitutional and contrary to the state's public policy."

In 1959, by appointment of Governor Pat Brown, Peters became an associate justice of the California Supreme Court. At the same time, Governor Brown appointed Absalom Francis Brown as the new Presiding Justice of the appellate court's First District, Division One, and Mathew O. Tobriner to take Peters's seat as an associate justice on that court. A liberal lion on the court led by Roger J. Traynor, Peters's notable cases include People v. Belous (1969), a landmark abortion decision that protected the constitutional right of a woman to control her own body. In December 1967, he wrote the majority opinion striking down the loyalty oath required in the state constitution of public employees. In 1971, he authored an opinion prohibiting discrimination on the basis of sex.

On January 2, 1973, Peters passed while still in office. The governor at the time, Ronald Reagan, appointed William P. Clark Jr. not long after to fill the vacant seat.

== Personal life ==
Peters was married to Marion Estabrook and had one daughter, Janet E. (Peters) Garrison, and one son Douglas who died at the age of 16.

== See also ==
- List of justices of the Supreme Court of California

Political offices
Preceded by Jesse W. Carter	Associate Justice of the Supreme Court of California; 1959–1973	Succeeded by William P. Clark Jr.
Preceded by John F. Tyler	Presiding Justice of the California Court of Appeal, First District, Division One; 1939–1959	Succeeded by Absalom Francis Brown
