= Mark Lazarus (businessman) =

American media executive and businessman

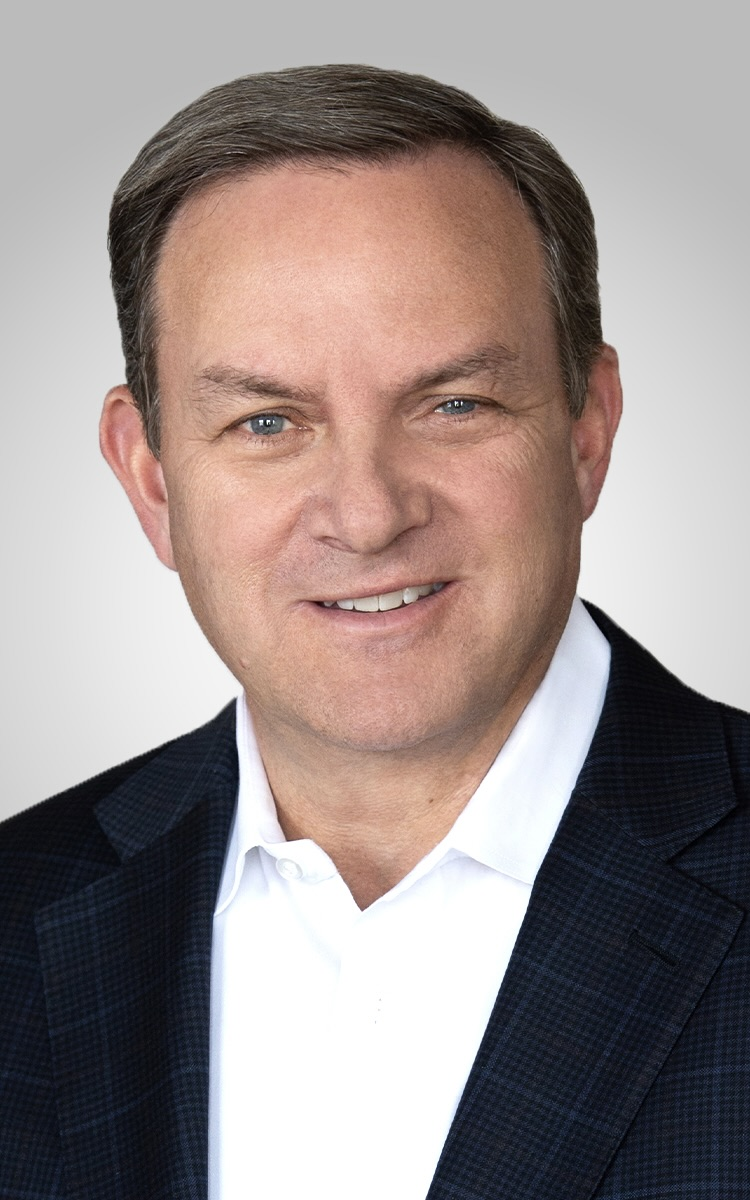
- Born: West Germany
- Education: Vanderbilt University (BA)
- Occupation: Media executive
- Spouse: Liz
- Children: 3

Mark Lazarus is an American media executive. He is the CEO of Versant, a spin-off company of NBCUniversal owned by Comcast shareholders. He previously was the chairman of NBCUniversal Media Group and NBC Sports Group. Prior to his work with NBC, he was the president of Turner Sports, Turner Entertainment Group and president of media and marketing of Career & Sport Entertainment.

== Early life ==
Lazarus was born on a military base in West Germany to John and Barbara Lazarus. His grandfather was Paul Lazarus, who worked for Warner Bros. and United Artists. He grew up in Chappaqua, New York in a media-focused family that includes brothers Peter and Craig, who are executives for NBC Sports Group and ESPN, respectively. Mark graduated from Vanderbilt University with a degree in political science.

== Career ==
Lazarus joined Turner Sports in 1990. He would later become the president of Turner Sports from 1999 to 2003, during which time he was able to recruit Charles Barkley, with whom he later became friends, to Inside the NBA. He was the president of Turner Entertainment Group from 2003 to 2008. During his time with Turner, he secured broadcasting deals with the National Basketball Association, Major League Baseball, NASCAR, Wimbeldon, and The Open Championship.

Lazarus was also the president of Career & Sport Entertainment (C&SE). He joined the company in 2008, where he worked on TV concepts, as well as marketing, PR, and event services for C&SE's clientel. He left the company by 2010.

Lazarus joined Comcast/NBC in 2010. would go on to serve as the chairman of NBCUniversal Broadcast. He later became chairman of NBC Sports Group, starting in May 2011. He replaced Dick Ebersol, who initially recruited Lazarus, as chairman. Prior to becoming chairman, he was the president of NBC Sports Cable Group, beginning in 2016. During his time with NBC Sports Group, he reached broadcast agreements with the Olympics, the NFL, NASCAR, and the Premier League. He was also the chairman of NBCUniversal Television and Streaming. He became the chairman of NBCUniversal Media Group in 2023.

On October 31, 2024, Mike Cavanagh announced on the company's 2024 third-quarter earnings call that it would consider a spin-off of its cable networks. The tax-free spin-off was completed on January 2, 2026, when Versant became an independent, publicly traded company. In January 2025, Lazarus was announced as the new CEO of this company, called "SpinCo", with Kini being announced as both the CFO and COO of the company. On May 6, 2025, it was announced that the company would be referred to as "Versant."

Lazarus was inducted into the Sports Broadcasting Hall of Fame in 2024.

== Personal life ==
Lazarus met his wife Liz while at Vanderbilt; They have 3 children together. Lazarus, in addition to his business ties, is on the Board of Governors of the Boys & Girls Clubs of America. He also serves on the Board of Directors of the East Lake Foundation and Hilton Grand Vacations.
