= Nancy Dubuc =

American businesswoman (born 1968)

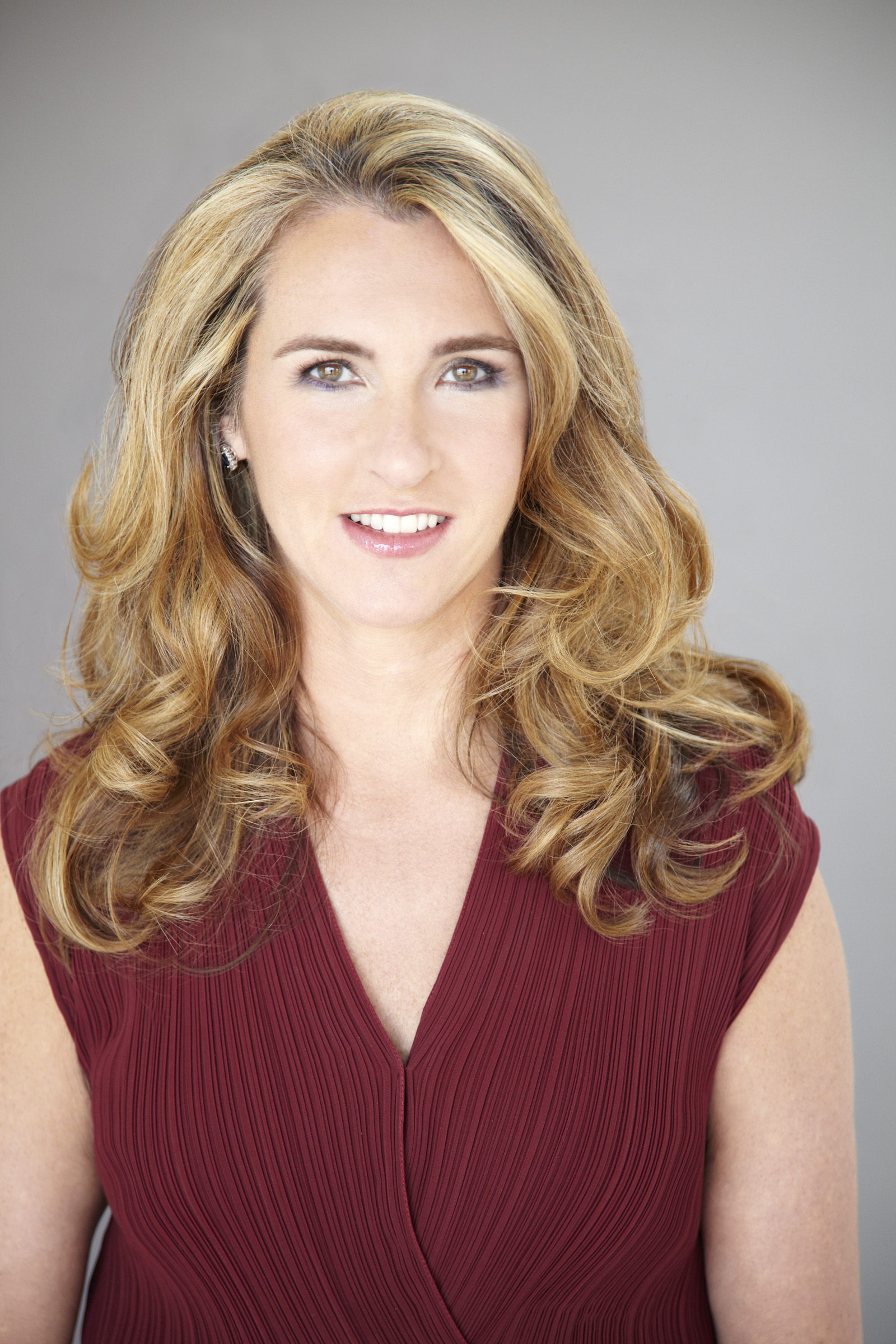
- Nancy Dubuc in 2012
- Born: Nancy Jean Dubuc; December 10, 1968 (age 57)
- Education: Boston University
- Spouse: Michael Rashid Kizilbash (m. 1997)

Nancy Jean Dubuc (born December 10, 1968) is an American businesswoman who was chief executive officer of the American-Canadian media company Vice Media.

== Early life and education ==
Dubuc is the daughter of Carol D. Smith and Robert H. Dubuc Jr. Her parents later separated and remarried, giving Dubuc step-parents. She was raised in Bristol, Rhode Island, graduated from Lincoln School in 1987 and Boston University in 1991 after rowing on the school's Division I crew team. Her mother ran one of Rhode Island's most successful catering companies. Calling her "a hard-driving, entrepreneurial woman", Dubuc credits the "directness" and strong opinions of her mother as inspiring her leadership style.

== Career ==
Dubuc briefly worked in NBC's publicity department before leaving to become a producer at The Christian Science Monitor and the Boston television station WGBH-TV. She later joined the History Channel and became the channel's director of historical programming. There, she convinced the network to adapt an episode of Modern Marvels into an entire series called Ice Road Truckers, which became History's then-highest-rated program.

She was appointed president and chief executive officer of the American media company A&E Networks in June 2013. Part of her role involved overseeing the cable networks History, A&E, and Lifetime. Under her leadership, the company delved into offering reality shows such as Duck Dynasty and other shows garnered large ratings. In 2013, Bloomberg called her "the show picker with the hottest hand in cable television". That year, Fortune included her on its list of 50 Most Powerful Women in Business. She has also been named to The Hollywood Reporter's annual Power 100 list four times, from 2011 to 2014.

In 2016, Dubuc was listed on Vanity Fair's New Establishment List, described as 100 "Silicon Valley hotshots, Hollywood moguls, Wall Street titans, and cultural icons." She is also a member of the Peabody Awards board of directors, which is presented by the University of Georgia's Henry W. Grady College of Journalism and Mass Communication.

In March 2018, Dubuc was named the new CEO of Vice Media one day after officially announcing her departure from A&E Networks. She succeeded Vice co-founder Shane Smith, who transitioned into the role of executive chairman. Dubuc left her position at A&E on April 16, 2018. She stepped down as CEO of Vice in February 2023.

In 2025, she joined Togethxr as executive chair.

== Personal life ==
In 1997, she married Michael Rashid Kizilbash, an Iranian-American copyeditor, in a Roman Catholic ceremony in Rhode Island. She has a son and a daughter.
