= Edward Rubin (attorney) =

American lawyer (1912–1999)

Edward "Eddie" Rubin (April 30, 1912 – September 16, 1999) was a Los Angeles–based entertainment lawyer, who represented such clients as Steve McQueen, Goldie Hawn, Warren Beatty and Howard Hughes. As a partner at Mitchell Silberberg & Knupp, Eddie chaired the firm's entertainment practice, during which time he represented several major film studios.

During his career, he served as president of the California Bar Association, the largest state bar association in the United States, and as a trustee of the Los Angeles County Bar Association.
