= Nina Tassler =

Television executive

- Born: New York City, New York, U.S.
- Education: Boston University (BFA)
- Occupations: Television executive, producer
- Years active: 2008–present
- Spouse: Jerry Levine (m. 1984)
- Children: 2

Nina Tassler is an American film and television executive and producer. She was most recently the chairwoman of CBS Entertainment until 2015.

== Life and career ==
Tassler was born in New York City to a Jewish father and a Puerto Rican mother who converted to Judaism. She was the highest profile Latina in network television and one of the few executives who had the power to greenlight series. Her boss was Nancy Tellem, President, CBS Paramount Network Television Entertainment Group. Tassler oversaw CBS' primetime, late night and daytime programming, as well as program development for all genres.

Tassler grew up in upstate New York and eventually graduated from Boston University (bachelor of fine arts in theater). After college, she moved to New York City and worked for Roundabout Theatre Co. After a few years, she moved to Los Angeles. There, she worked as a talent agent at Triad Artists for about 5 years before moving on to Warner Brothers.

Tassler joined CBS in August 1997 as VP Drama, CBS Productions, before moving to the network as SVP Drama Development in 1998, then becoming President of Entertainment in 2004 and chairman in 2014.

== Filmography ==
- How to Be Successful Without Hurting Men's Feelings
- Ways & Means

== Awards/nominations ==
- 1997 - Distinguished Service to the Profession, a Boston University Distinguished Alumni award
- 2005 - Creative Achievement Award, Imagen Foundation Awards.
- 2007 - Television Showman of the Year, Publicists Guild of America.
- 2013 - Career Achievement Award, Casting Society of America.
- 2018 - Top Latino Leaders, National Diversity Council.
- The Most Powerful and Influential Latinos in Entertainment by The Imagen Foundation in 2011 and 2013 and 2015

== Other positions ==
- Executive Vice President, Drama Series Development, CBS Entertainment (July 2003–September 2004)
- Senior Vice President, Drama Development, CBS Entertainment (1998–July 2003)
- Vice President, Drama, CBS Productions (August 1997–1998)
- Vice President, Drama Development, Warner Bros. Television (199?–1997)
- Director, Movies and Mini-Series, Lorimar/Warner Bros. Television (1990–?)

== Personal life ==
Tassler is married to actor/director Jerry Levine, who is also a graduate of Boston University. They have two children.

== See also ==
- List of Puerto Ricans
- Jewish immigration to Puerto Rico
