= Donna Langley =

American-resident British film executive (born 1968)

Dame Donna Langley DBE
- Born: 1968 (age 57–58); London, England
- Occupation: Film executive
- Title: Chairwoman and Chief Content Officer of Universal Filmed Entertainment Group
- Partner: Ramin Shamshiri
- Children: 2

Dame Donna Langley-Shamshiri DBE (born 1968) is a British film executive who is chairwoman of Universal Pictures and Universal Filmed Entertainment Group and Chief Content Officer.

== Career ==
After moving to Los Angeles and waitressing, Langley became an assistant to a talent manager. Shortly after, Langley met Michael De Luca who gave her a job as a production executive at New Line Cinema. In 2001, she became senior vice president of production at Universal Pictures. She was then promoted to Chair of Universal Pictures in 2013, Chair of Universal Filmed Entertainment Group in 2019, and Chair of NBCUniversal Studio Group and Chief Content Officer in 2023. Langley is one of the longest tenured studio heads in Hollywood history.

In her time at Universal, Langley has overseen the Fast & Furious, Despicable Me, and Bourne film franchises. She is known for cultivating strong relationships with filmmakers and writers. Langley backed Jordan Peele's directorial debut, Get Out, and his follow ups, Us and Nope. Langley was also credited with recruiting director Christopher Nolan to Universal from Warner Bros. His movie Oppenheimer was added to a streak of successes for Langley in 2023, after M3GAN, Cocaine Bear, and The Super Mario Bros. Movie.

Her work includes overseeing the global specialty division, Focus Features, as well as the animation studios Illumination and DreamWorks Animation, the latter being acquired by Universal in 2016. Langley's role was expanded in 2023; as Chief Content Officer, she is not only responsible for overseeing Universal's film slate, but also the company's TV and streaming strategy.

Throughout her career, she has supported mentorship opportunities for women. Langley helped launch The Hollywood Reporter's Women in Film Mentorship program. She also serves as an ambassador and board member for the nonprofit Vital Voices.

Langley was appointed Dame Commander of the Order of the British Empire (DBE) in the 2020 New Year Honours for services to film and entertainment.

== Recognition ==
Forbes ranked her as the 57th most powerful woman in the world in 2023. The Hollywood Reporter consistently ranks Donna among the most powerful women and executives in Hollywood, including labeling as "top female film executive" in 2024. She has also been listed as one of Time Magazine's most powerful people in the world.

On February 11, 2026, BAFTA announced that they are awarding Langley with the BAFTA Fellowship, at this year’s Film Awards.

== Personal life ==
Langley was adopted, and was brought up on the Isle of Wight. She attended Carisbrooke College, and was a pupil at Kent College in Canterbury. She is married with two children, and lives in Los Angeles with her family.
