= Women in film =

Women involved in the film industry

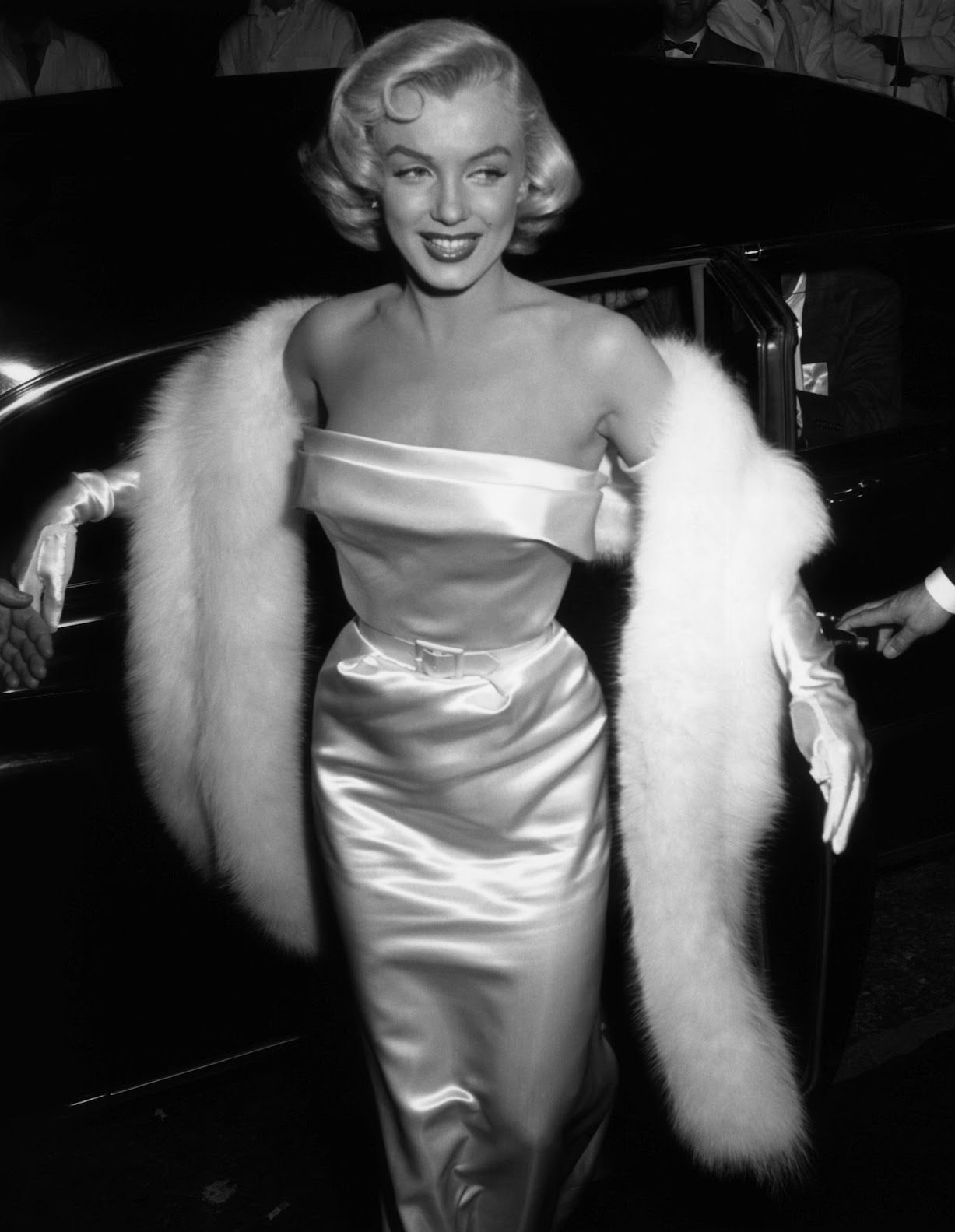
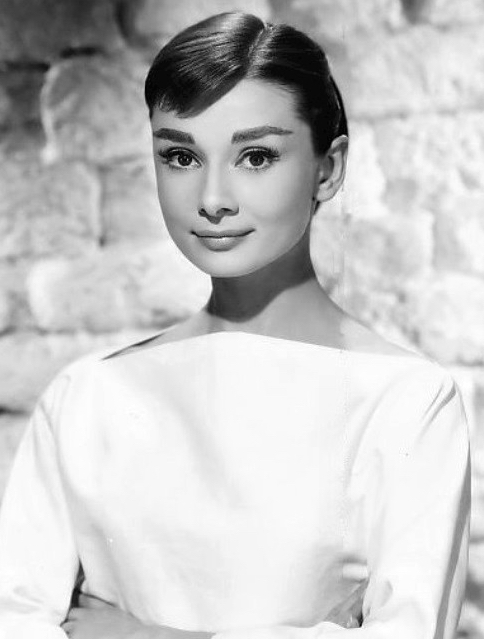
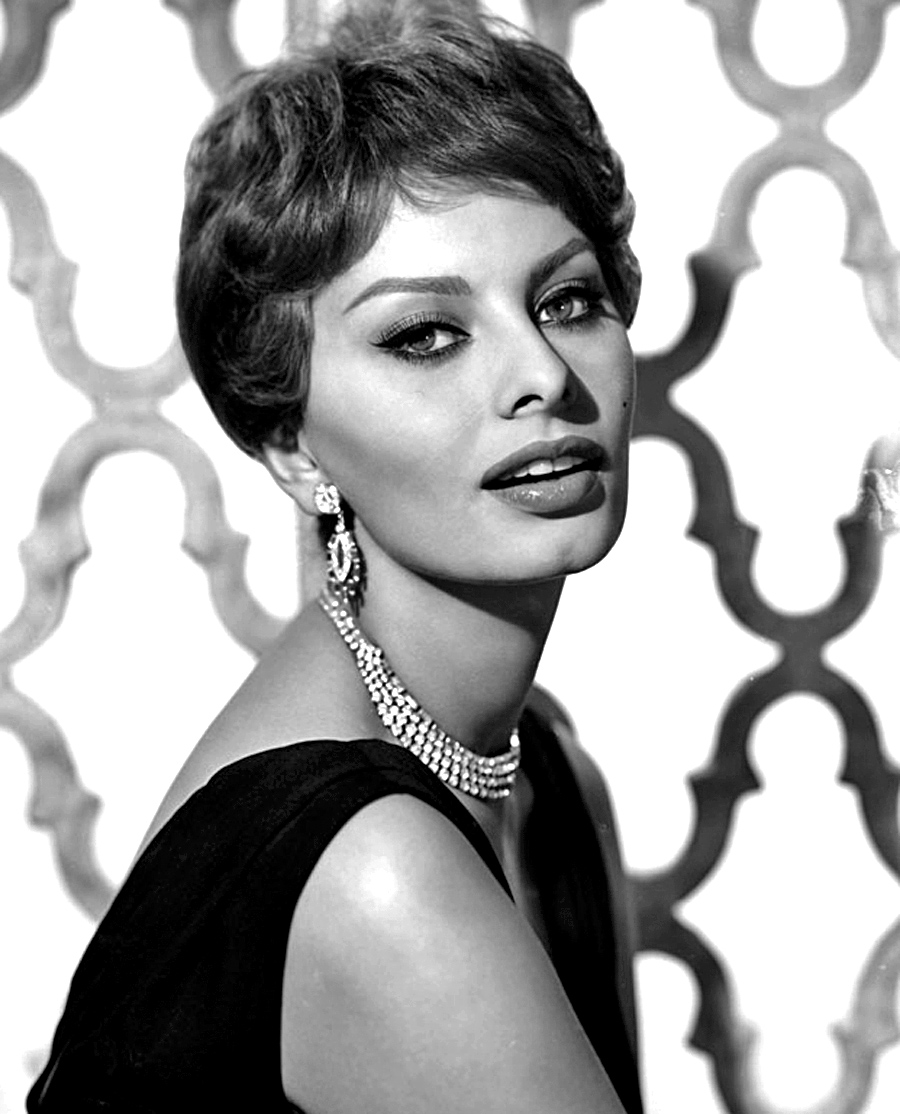
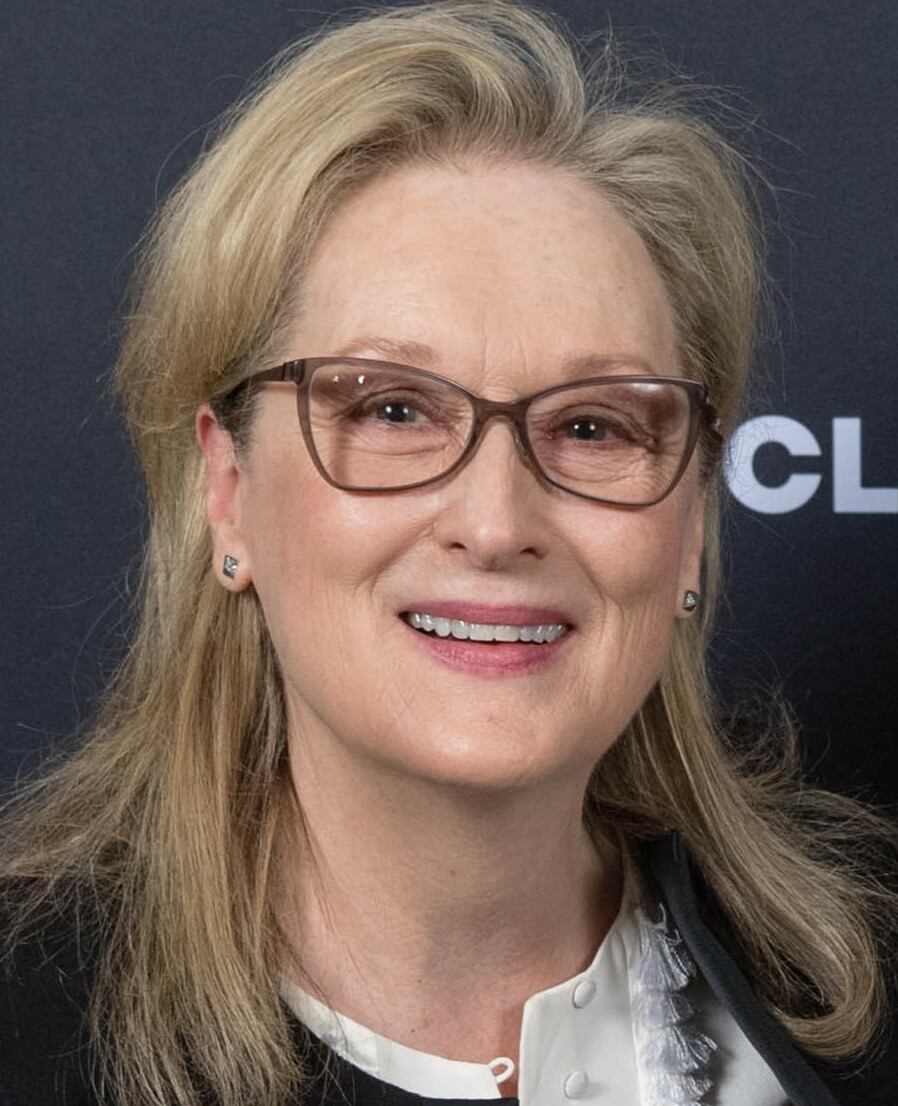
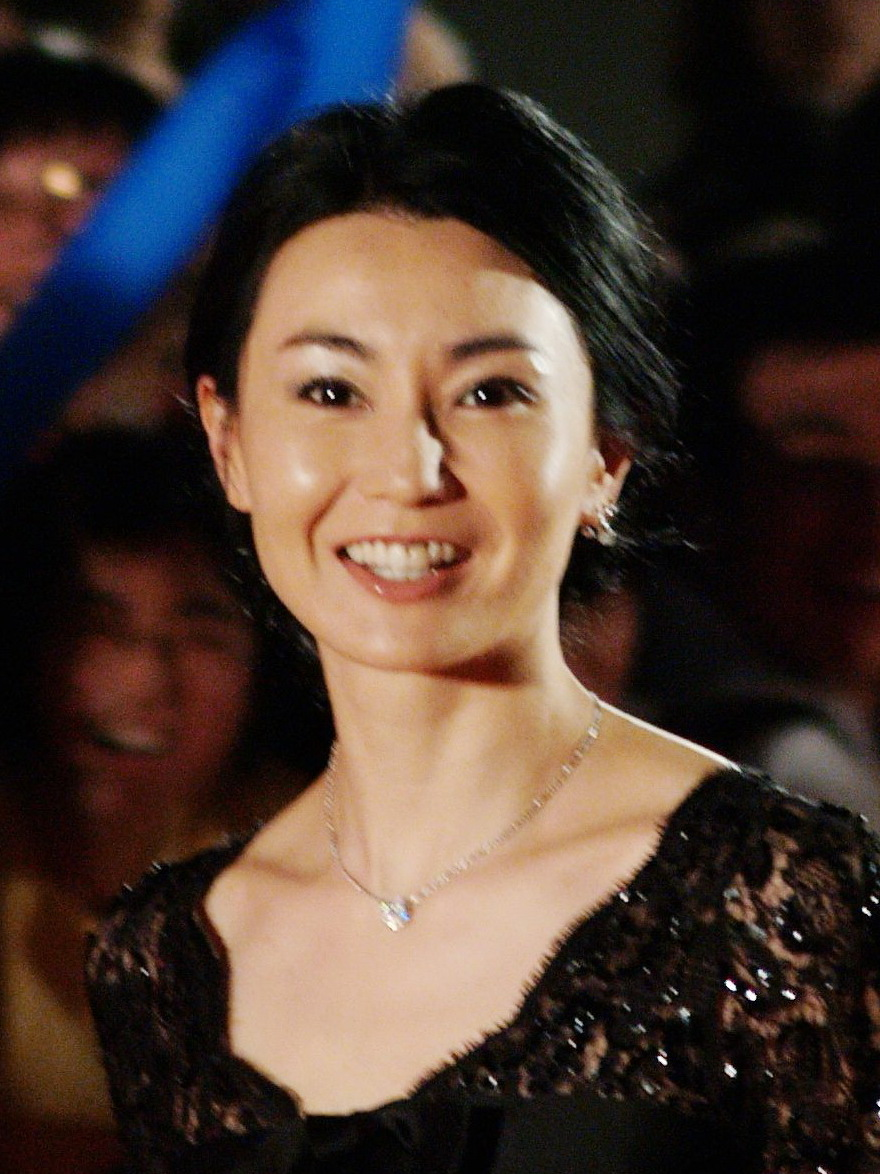
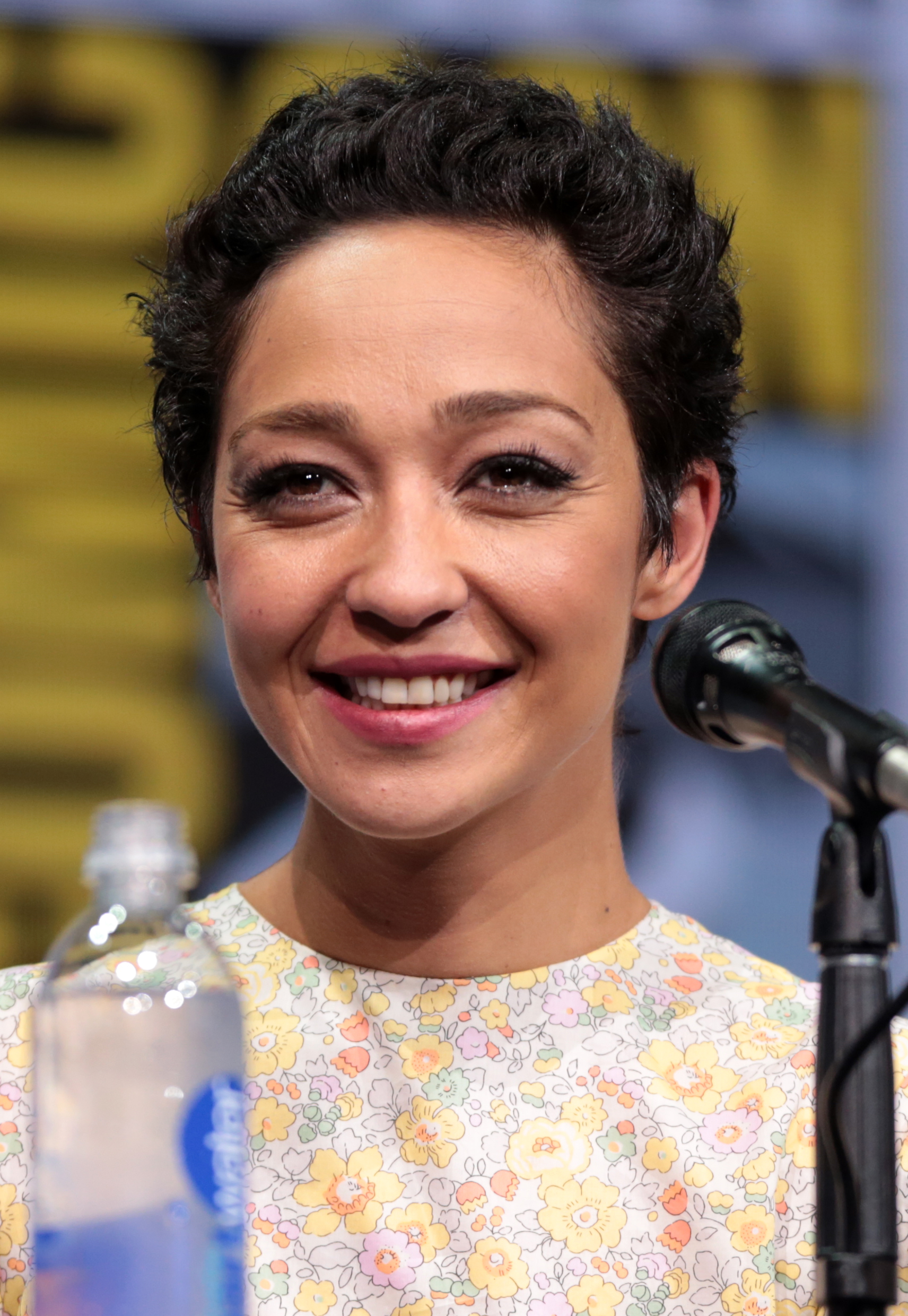
From left to right, top to bottom: Marilyn Monroe, Audrey Hepburn, Sophia Loren, Meryl Streep, Maggie Cheung, Ruth Negga

Women are involved in the film industry in all roles, including as film directors, actresses, cinematographers, film producers, film critics, and other film industry professions, though women have been underrepresented in creative positions.

Most English-language academic study and media coverage focus on the issue in the US film industry (Hollywood), although inequalities also exist in other countries. This underrepresentation has been called the "celluloid ceiling", a variant on the employment discrimination term "glass ceiling".

Women have always had a presence in film acting, but have consistently been underrepresented, and on average significantly less well paid. On the other hand, many key roles in filmmaking were for many decades done almost entirely by men, such as directors and cinematographers. For instance, the title of 'auteur' is typically administered to men, even with women auteurs persevering and growing beside them. In more recent times, women have made inroads and made contributions to many of these fields.

== Pay and representation ==
The 2013 Celluloid Ceiling Report conducted by the Center for the Study of Women in Television and Film at San Diego State University collected statistics from 2,813 individuals employed by the 250 top domestic grossing films of 2012. According to the report, women accounted for:

- 18% of all directors, executive producers, producers, writers, cinematographers, and editors. This reflected no change from 2011 and only a 1% increase from 1998.
- 9% of all directors.
- 15% of writers.
- 25% of all producers.
- 20% of all editors.
- 2% of all cinematographers.
- 38% of films employed 0 or 1 woman in the roles considered, 23% employed 2 women, 28% employed 3 to 5 women, and 10% employed 6 to 9 women.

A New York Times article stated that only 15% of the top films in 2013 had women for a lead acting role. The author of the study noted that, "The percentage of female speaking roles has not increased much since the 1940s, when they hovered around 25 percent to 28 percent." "Since 1998, women's representation in behind-the-scenes roles other than directing has gone up just 1 percent." Women "...directed the same percent of the 250 top-grossing films in 2012 (9 percent) as they did in 1998".

In 2015, Forbes reported that "...just 21 of the 100 top-grossing films of 2014 featured a female lead or co-lead, while only 28.1% of characters in 100 top-grossing films were female... This means it's much rarer for women to get the sort of blockbuster role which would warrant the massive backend deals many male counterparts demand (Tom Cruise in Mission: Impossible or Robert Downey Jr. in Iron Man, for example)". In the U.S., there is an "industry-wide [gap] in salaries of all scales. On average, white women get paid 78 cents to every dollar a white man makes, while Hispanic women earn 56 cents to a white male's dollar, Black women 64 cents and Native American women just 59 cents to that." Forbes' analysis of US acting salaries in 2013 determined that the "...men on Forbes’ list of top-paid actors for that year made 2½ times as much money as the top-paid actresses. That means that Hollywood's best-compensated actresses made just 40 cents for every dollar that the best-compensated men made." Studies have shown that "...age and gender discrimination [together] can yield an even more significant wage gap." Young women actresses tend to make more than young male actors. However, "older [male] actors make more than their female equals" in age, with "female movie stars mak[ing] the most money on average per film at age 34, while male stars earn the most at 51."

According to actress Jennifer Lawrence, "...women negotiating for higher pay worry about seeming 'difficult' or 'spoiled.'"

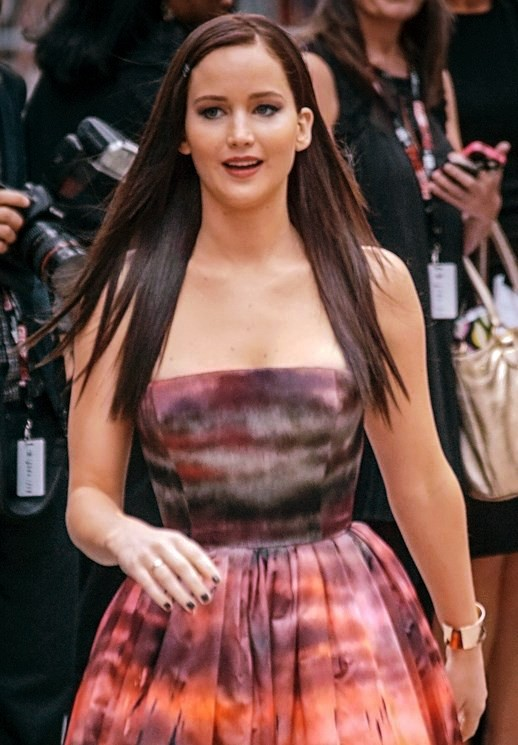
Jennifer Lawrence, was the world's highest-paid actress in 2015 and 2016, and her films have grossed over $6 billion worldwide to date.

In the 2019 update, the center for the Study of Women in Television and Film has been studying women's employment with the top-grossing films and TV for over 20 years. The 2018 study reported women make up (from the top 250 films):

- 8% of directors
- 16% of writers
- 4% of cinematographers
- 26% of producers
- 21% of executive producers
- 21% of editors.

According to the Study of Women in Television and Film at San Diego State University, male characters continued to control the big screen in 2018.

- about 35% of films contained 10 or more female characters in dialogue roles
- about 82% had 10 or more male characters in speaking roles.

It has only increase 1 percentage point from 34% since 2017. The percentage of highest-grossing films featuring female protagonists increased to 31% in 2018 but before it was 37% in 2017. This shows how it has decreases and how women in media are being seen less.

- Black females increased from 16% in 2017 to 21% in 2018
- Latinas decreased from 7% in 2017 to 4% in 2018
- Asian females increased from 7% in 2017 to 10% in 2018.

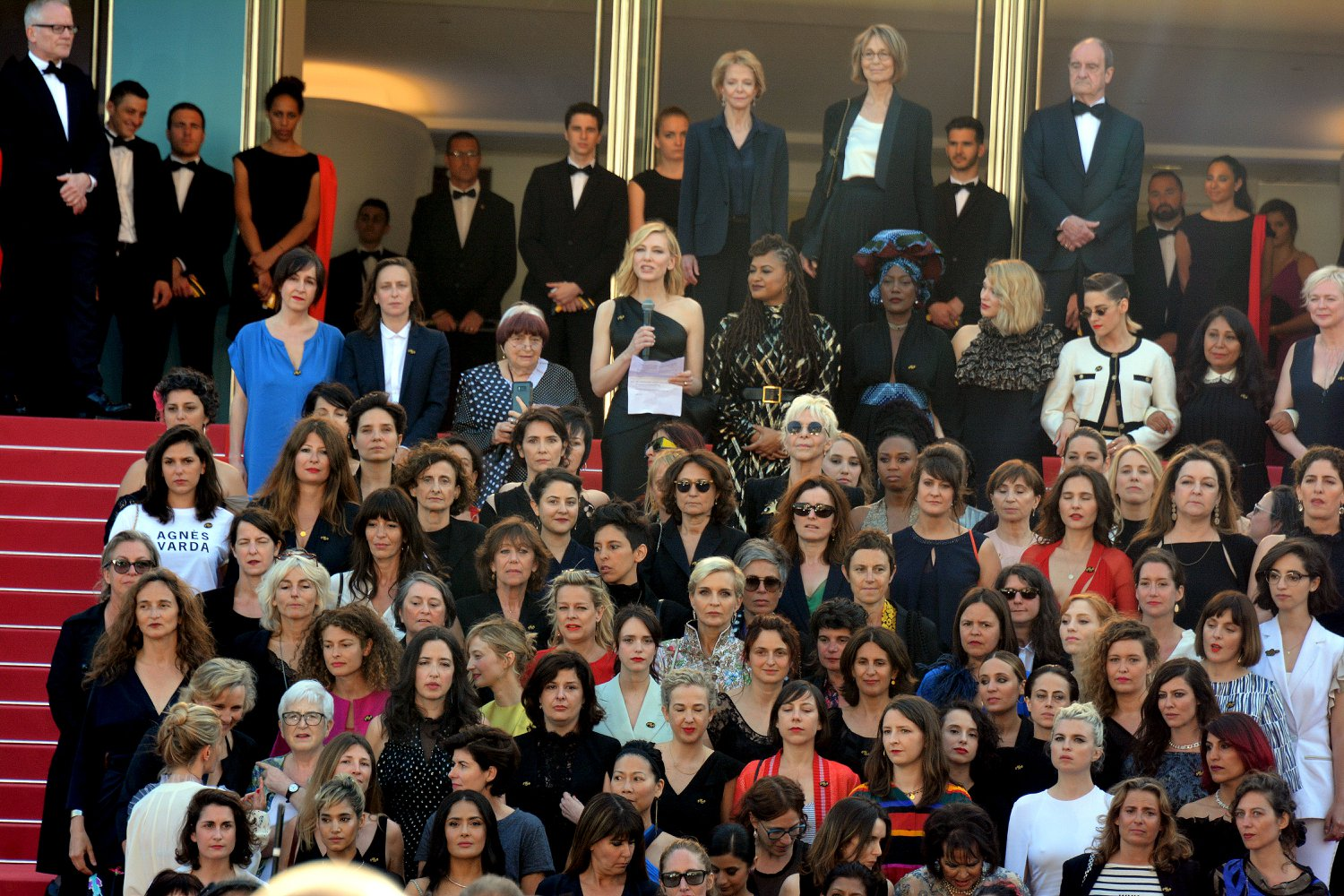
A demonstration for equal pay and parity at the 2018 Cannes Film Festival

At the 2018 Cannes Film Festival, 82 women stood up for gender inequality within the festival. They all gathered on the steps during the premiere of a film called Girls of the Sun, directed by Eva Husson, who was one of the few female directors nominated for "Palme d'Or" award. There were specifically 82 women, because that is the amount of female directors who have been nominated for awards at Cannes over the years, compared to 1,645 male directors nominated films. As of 2020, there are no dedicated gender studies that prove inequality in participation in film between women and men; public knowledge is reliant on the numbers and testimonies provided by those on the inside.

== Female Characters in Early Cinema ==
Female characters in early cinema reflected the gender norms of their era, and the evolution of these roles demonstrated how society expected women to present themselves. Early film companies drew from popular literature and cultural ideals that portrayed women as pure, domestic, and within the traditional "proper bounds" of femininity.

One of the most common early character types was the damsel in distress, whose primary purpose was to be rescued by a heroic man. This archetype is very similar to the ingenue, who is defined by Dictionary.com as a girl who is young, innocent, and inexperienced. This portrayal of women is a direct reflection of contemporary beliefs that women were incapable of helping themselves, and her identity was centered around romance, innocence, and moral virtue. Early films used these archetypes to reinforce sexist expectations of female behavior.

By the 1920s, new societal attitudes regarding women's sexuality brought the rise of the flapper, a modern and fashionable character popularized by actresses such as Colleen Moore. On screen, flappers were carefree, adventurous, and expressive of their sexuality in ways earlier characters were not. Their fashion taste and carefree manner were considered provocative for the time. as the flapper was adventurous, playful, and often seen in attire such as V-necks, and long and loose dresses that cut off above their knees. This character ranged from spirited and humorous to overtly bold, giving audiences an image of a young woman who was independent, socially active, and less tied to domestic expectations.

Silent cinema also developed the vamp, who was known for seduction, manipulation, and deceit. This trope is often associated with actresses like Theda Bara, who used beauty and charm to lure men into dangerous or compromising situations. Britannica describes this character as "a seductive and beautiful woman who brings disaster to anyone with whom she becomes romantically involved". Although the archetype is sometimes viewed as degrading, it also is a complete contrast from earlier portrayals of women, who were helpless and dependent. Instead, the vamp represented a character who exercised control, strategy, and agency, even when framed as villainous.

Another influential figure of the period was the heroine, especially in performances by Mary Pickford, who was arguably the most famous actress of this era. The American Psychology Association describes the heroine as having endurance, courage, perseverance, and the choice to solve societal problems with moral action. These powerful female characters balanced innocence with capability, presenting a character who was admired without being transgressive. This type of role created a middle ground between the ingénue and the vamp and helped shape early Hollywood's lasting image of a strong yet virtuous female lead.

== Women's cinema ==
Women's cinema refers to films by film directors and, to a lesser degree, the work of other women behind the camera such as cinematographers and screenwriters. Although the work of women film editors, costume designers, and production designers is usually not considered to be decisive enough to justify the term "women's cinema", it does have a large influence on the visual impression of any movie. Some of the most distinguished women directors have tried to avoid the association with women's cinema in the fear of marginalization and ideological controversy.

Alice Guy-Blaché made the first narrative film La Fée aux Choux in 1896. In Sweden, Ebba Lindkvist debuted as a film maker in 1910, and the following year Anna Hofman-Uddgren debuted when she produced the silent film Stockholmsfrestelser in 1911. Lois Weber was a successful film director of the silent era. Women screenwriters included Frances Marion, Anita Loos and June Mathis. In the 1920s, large banks assumed control of Hollywood production companies. Dorothy Arzner was the only woman filmmaker in this era. Germaine Dulac was a leading member of the French avant-garde film movement after World War I and Maya Deren did experimental cinema.

Shirley Clarke was an independent American filmmaker in the 1950s. The National Film Board of Canada allowed many women to produce non-commercial films. Joyce Wieland was a Canadian experimental film maker. Early feminist films often focused on personal experiences. Wanda (1970) by Barbara Loden is a portrait of alienation. Resisting the oppression of female sexuality was one of the core goals of second wave feminism. Women's films explored female sexuality, including the films of Birgit Hein, Nelly Kaplan, Catherine Breillat, Celine Sciamma, Barbara Hammer. Women film directors also documented the participation of women in anti-imperialist movements.

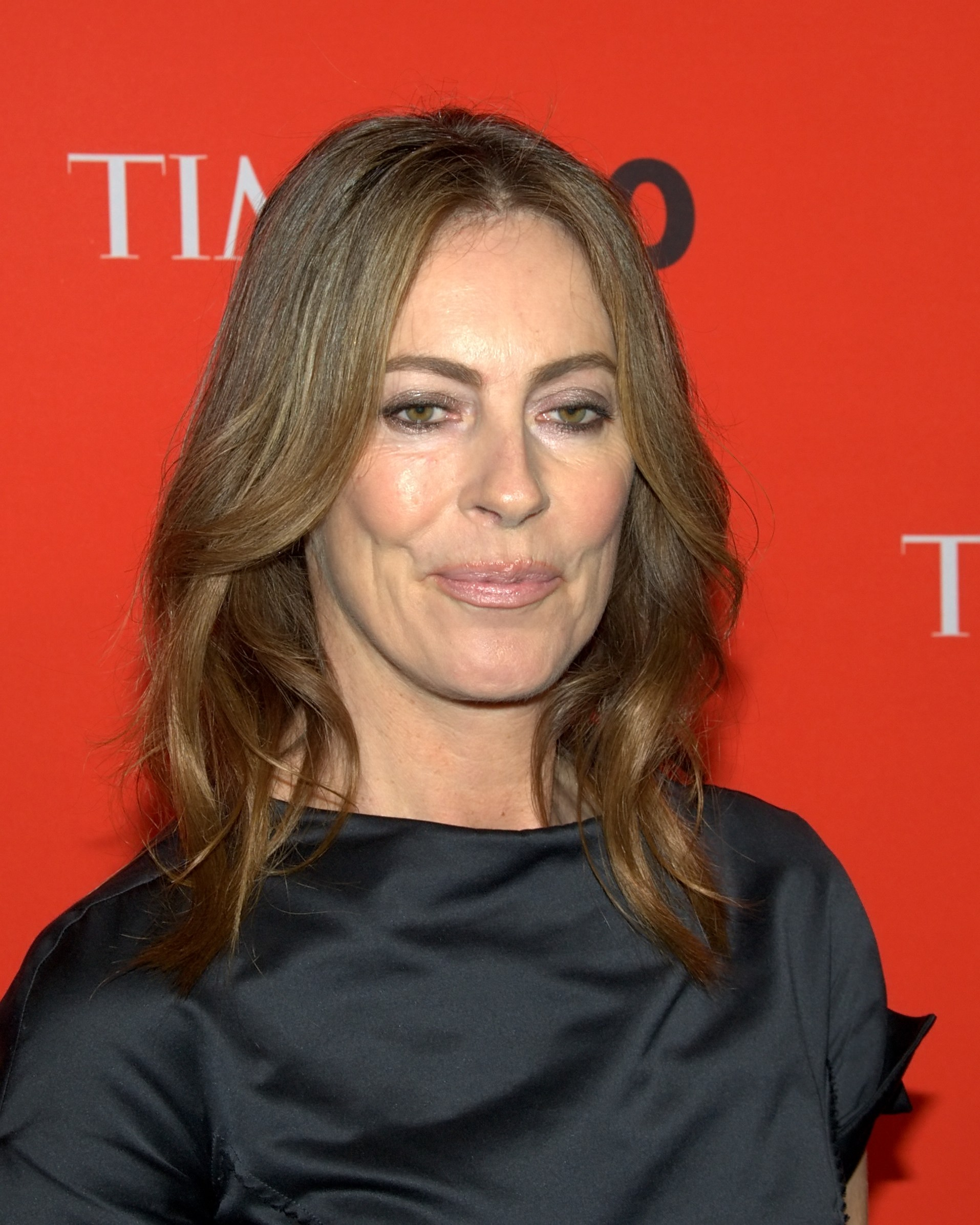
Kathryn Bigelow (born 1951) is an American director, producer, and writer. With The Hurt Locker (2009), Bigelow became the first woman to win the Academy Award for Best Director.

Director Kathryn Bigelow works in male-dominated genres like science fiction, action, and horror. She became the first woman to win both the Academy Award for Best Director and the Directors Guild of America Award in 2010 for The Hurt Locker. Catherine Hardwicke's films have grossed a cumulative total of $551.8 million. Her most successful films are Twilight (2008) and Red Riding Hood (2011).

Nancy Meyers has had success with her five features: The Parent Trap (1998), What Women Want (2000), Something's Gotta Give (2003), The Holiday (2006) and It's Complicated (2009) which have amassed $1,157.2 million worldwide. Before she started her directorial career she wrote some other successful films like Private Benjamin (1980) for which she was nominated for the Academy Award for Best Original Screenplay, Baby Boom (1987) or Father of the Bride (1991).

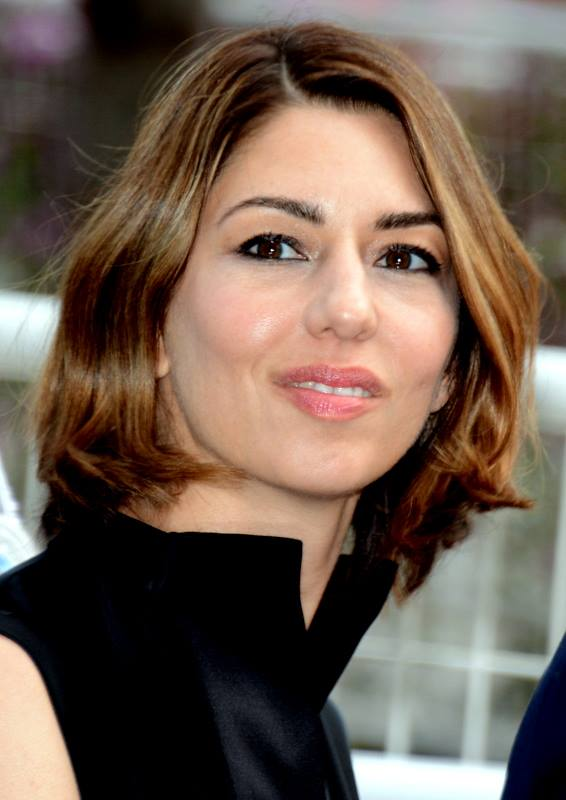
Sofia Coppola is the youngest child and only daughter of filmmakers Eleanor and Francis Ford Coppola.

Sofia Coppola is a critically acclaimed director who has also had financial success. Her award-winning film Lost in Translation (2003) grossed over $119 million.

Julie Taymor's film Frida about revered Mexican artist Frida Kahlo was nominated for six Academy Awards, and her "1960s Beatles jukebox musical" Across the Universe won approval from both Yoko Ono and Paul McCartney. These films developed her reputation for respectful handling of the sensitive legacy of artists amongst their fans.

Julie Dash's Daughters of the Dust (1991) was the first full-length film with general theatrical release written and directed by an African American woman. Since then there have been several African women who have written, produced or directed films with national release. In 1994 Darnell Martin became the first African American woman to write and direct a film produced by a major studio when Columbia Pictures backed I Like It Like That. Nnegest Likké is the first African American woman to write, direct and act in a full-length movie released by a major studio, Phat Girlz (2006) starring Jimmy Jean-Louis and Mo'Nique.

Patricia Cardoso was the first Latina woman to receive a Sundance Audience Award and a Student Academy Award. Cardoso's feature film Real Women Have Curves (2002) was a box office and critical success and has become a landmark of Latinx cinema. In 2019, Real Women Have Curves was selected by the Library of Congress for preservation in the National Film Registry for being "culturally, historically, or aesthetically significant". Linda Mendoza made her feature film directorial debut with the film Chasing Papi in 2003. Mendoza's directorial career began in 1992, directing promotional segments for Fox and MTV. Another film maker Patricia Riggen is best known for directing the 2007 film Under the Same Moon and the 2016 film Miracles from Heaven. The film Miracles from Heaven become the 8th highest-grossing Christian film in the United States and the highest by a female director. Natalia Almada first feature film, "Everything Else (Todo lo demás)" (2016) was funded in part by a MacArthur Fellowship making her the first Latina filmmaker to earn this distinction. Aurora Guerrero has directed award-winning short narrative films, including Pura Lengua (pure tongue) at the 2005 Sundance Film Festival and Viernes Girl (Friday Girl) was the winner of the 2006 HBO/NYLIFF short film competition. From Peru and Academy Award-nominated film director Claudia Llosa has directed Aloft.

Wonder Woman became DC's first female-led superhero film. Directed by Patty Jenkins, the film starred Gal Gadot as Princess Diana, an immortal warrior who sets out to stop World War I, believing the conflict was started by the longtime enemy of the Amazons, Ares, after American pilot and spy Steve Trevor crash-lands on their island Themyscira and informs her about it. The film grossed over $800 million. Not only was the first film a major step forward for women in cinema, Jenkins' sequel film, Wonder Woman 1984, was the first film to enforce the Producers Guild of America anti-sexual harassment guidelines during production.

Captain Marvel became Marvel's first female-led superhero film. Directed by Anna Boden and Ryan Fleck, the film starred Brie Larson as Carol Danvers, a pilot turned Kree superhero who must discover her forgotten past and help save Earth from alien invasion. The film grossed over $1 billion making it the seventh Marvel film to reach that milestone.

== Women's films ==
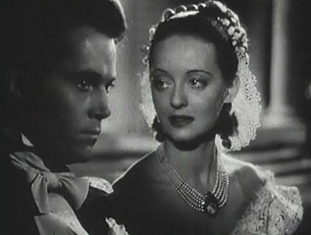
Bette Davis and Henry Fonda in Jezebel (1938), one of the quintessential woman's films. Davis plays a Southern belle who loses her fiancé (Fonda) and her social standing when she defies conventions. She redeems herself by self-sacrifice.

A woman's film is a film genre which includes women-centered narratives, female protagonists and is designed to appeal to a female audience. Woman's films usually portray "women's concerns" such as problems revolving around domestic life, the family, motherhood, self-sacrifice, and romance. Due to the male-dominated film industry, there is an unequal portrayal of women on screen. Woman's films help remove the narrative that women are emotional, powerless, and have the desire to be rescued. These films were produced from the silent era through the 1950s and early 1960s, but were most popular in the 1930s and 1940s, reaching their zenith during World War II. Although Hollywood continued to make films characterized by some of the elements of the traditional woman's film in the second half of the 20th century, the term itself largely disappeared in the 1960s.

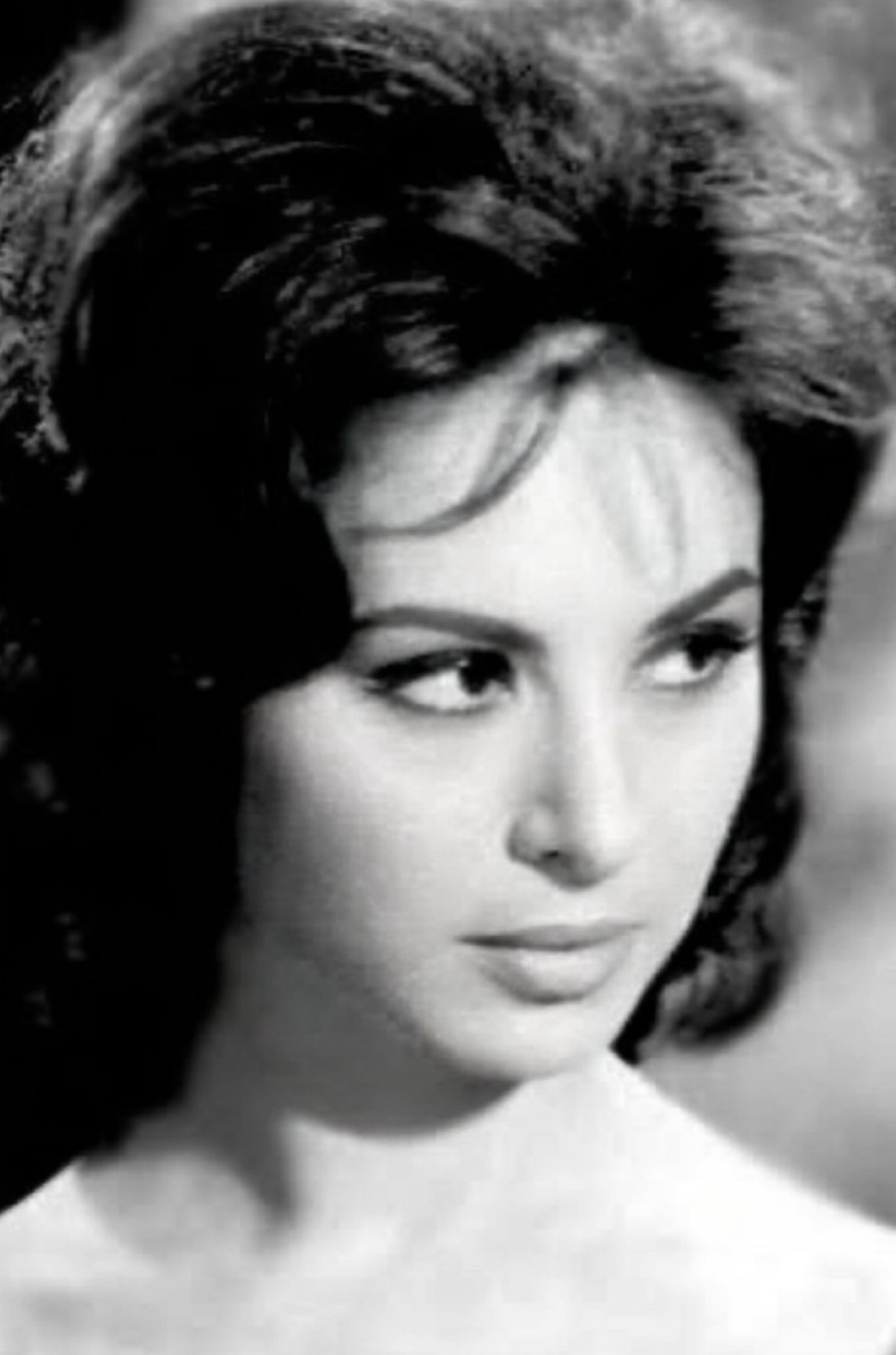
Faten Hamama (1931–2015), Egyptian film legend, inspired women all over the Middle East and Africa.

The work of directors George Cukor, Douglas Sirk, Max Ophüls, and Josef von Sternberg has been associated with the woman's film genre. Joan Crawford, Bette Davis, and Barbara Stanwyck were some of the genre's most prolific stars. The beginnings of the genre can be traced back to D. W. Griffith's silent films. Film historians and critics defined the genre and canon in retrospect. Before the woman's film became an established genre in the 1980s, many of the classic woman's films were referred to as melodramas. Anne Fontaine directed Coco Before Chanel and The Innocents, Fontaine established herself as a very progressive filmmaker of her time when saying this, establishing that ‘women's cinema’ should be based on the filmmaker's perspective rather than their gender. This also suggests that classifying and interpreting films in the category of ‘women's cinema’ is creating bias and exclusivity among the genre in itself, when it should be a network of creation and empowerment, as Fontaine always intended. While knowing that the movement of ‘women's cinema’ worked as a counter to the classical Hollywood system, Fontaine didn't like to identify with this. During an interview in 1998 with Eve-Laure Moros, she stated: "I think that to be a filmmaker, as far as sexuality, it's something that's really de-sexualizing. That is, you become a bizarre thing, when you're directing a film—during the shooting, you're neither a man nor a woman, you're really something strange and very ambivalent."

=== Chick flicks ===
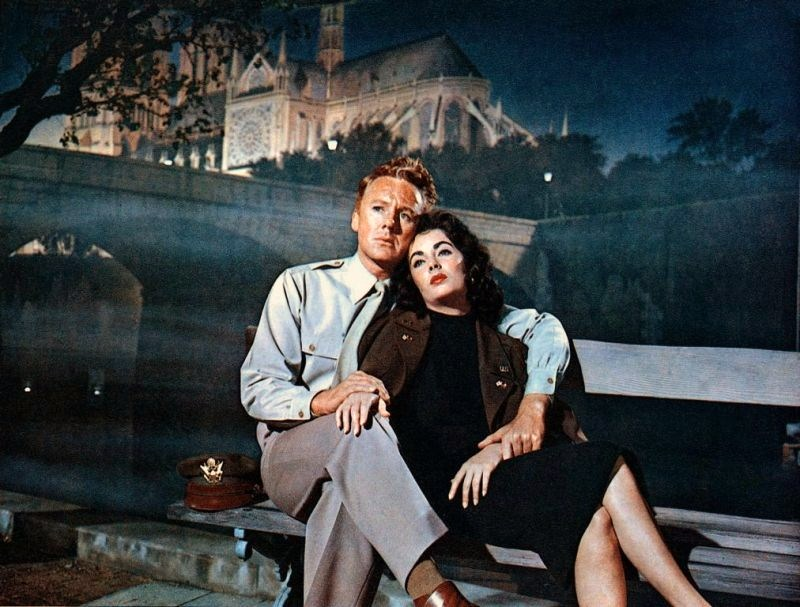
Elizabeth Taylor and Van Johnson in the romantic drama The Last Time I Saw Paris (1954)

Chick flick is a slang term for the film genre dealing mainly with love and romance and is targeted to a female audience. Feminists such as Gloria Steinem have objected to terms such as "chick flick" and the related term "chick lit" and a film critic has called the term "chick flick" derogatory. It can be specifically defined as a genre in which a woman is the protagonist. Although many types of films may be directed toward the female gender, "chick flick" is typically used only in reference to films that emotion or contain themes that are relationship-based (although not necessarily romantic as many other themes may be present). Chick flicks often are released en masse around Valentine's Day. The equivalent for male audiences is the guy-cry film.

Generally, a chick flick is a film designed to have an innate appeal to women, typically young women. Defining a chick flick is, as the New York Times has stated, more of a parlor game than a science. These films are generally held in popular culture as having formulaic, paint-by-numbers plot lines and characters. This makes usage of the term "problematic" for implying "frivolity, artlessness, and utter commercialism", according to ReelzChannel. However, several chick flicks have received high critical acclaim for their stories and performances. For example, the 1983 film Terms of Endearment received Academy Awards for Best Screenplay, Best Picture, Best Director, Best Actress, and Best Actor in a Supporting Role.

Nora Ephron was known for her romantic comedy films and was nominated three times for the Academy Award for Best Original Screenplay: for Silkwood, When Harry Met Sally..., and Sleepless in Seattle. Her last film was Julie & Julia. More recently films such as Return to Me, What a Girl Wants, Bride and Prejudice, Bridget Jones's Diary and its sequel Bridget Jones: The Edge of Reason, 27 Dresses, I Hate Valentine's Day, Post Grad, The Proposal, Friends with Kids, Obvious Child, Everything, Everything, Always Be My Maybe, Little Women and Wild Mountain Thyme have been also been made.

=== Girlfriend flicks ===
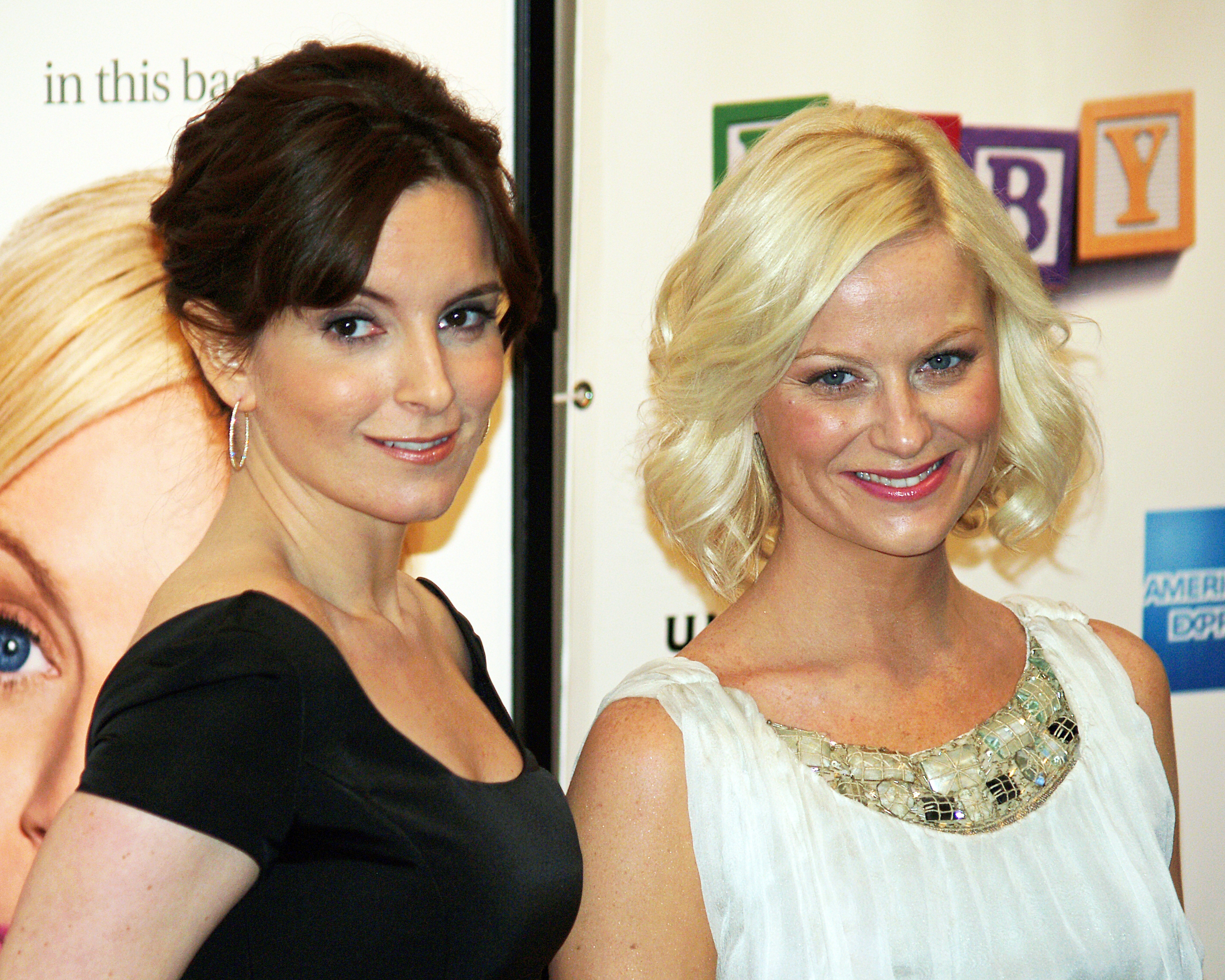
Tina Fey (left) with Amy Poehler (right) at the premiere of Baby Mama in New York, April 23, 2008.

While the plot of a chick flick is typically expected to be centered around a romantic conquest, Alison Winch ("We Can Have It All") writes about films she calls "girlfriend flicks". These movies emphasize the relationships between friends instead of focusing on a love connection, and examples include Sense and Sensibility, Pride and Prejudice, Friends with Money, Bride Wars, Baby Mama, You Again, Laggies, Chasing Papi and The Other Woman.

According to Winch,

Girlfriend flicks often have savvy, "nervous," female voice-overs mirroring typical romantic comedies, but addressing female spectators in their assumption of the mutual minefield of negotiating relationships, body, work, family, depression—issues prevalent in conduct, diet, and self-help books marketed specifically to women.

Winch also states that the girlfriend flicks are meant to criticize "second wave feminism's superficial understanding of female solidarity" by showing "conflict, pain, and betrayal acted out between women". By emphasizing the "complexities of women's relationships", the girlfriend flick breaks the mold for the usual chick flick and allows the genre to gain a bit of depth.

The Sisterhood of the Traveling Pants is an example of a girlfriend flick in which four friends (Blake Lively, America Ferrera, Alexis Bledel, Amber Tamblyan) discover a pair of pants that fits them all despite their different body types.

The Pitch Perfect series is a girlfriend flick focusing on a group of girls in an a cappella group travelling together to compete in singing competitions. The film franchise stars Anna Kendrick and is directed by Elizabeth Banks.

=== Female buddy film ===
A female buddy film is a film where the main characters are female and the plot focuses on their situations. The cast is often mostly female, depending on the plot like the film Thelma & Louise, A League of Their Own, Clueless, Charlie's Angels, The Cheetah Girls, Tinker Bell, Whip It, Bad Moms, Life of the Party, Neighbors 2: Sorority Rising, The Craft: Legacy and I Am Mother.

Ghostbusters (2016) directed by Paul Fieg and starring Melissa McCarthy was a remake of the movie Ghostbusters (1984) where the main cast was changed from all male to all female. Ocean's 8 directed by Gary Ross and starring Sandra Bullock, Cate Blanchett, and Anne Hathaway was another film where the cast was changed from male to female. Jessica Chastain proposed the idea for a female-led spy film in the same spirit as the Mission: Impossible and James Bond series to her Dark Phoenix director Simon Kinberg while in production on that film. The concept was built upon in film The 355, it was announced that Kinberg would direct the film with Chastain producing, in addition to her starring alongside Marion Cotillard, Penélope Cruz, Fan Bingbing and Lupita Nyong'o. Films such as Bachelorette, Bombshell, Like a Boss, and Birds of Prey lands squarely in the space between the familiar and the fresh, between "saw that coming" and "hmm, nice!" Writing partners Sam Pitman and Adam Cole-Kelly cadging more than a little from Bridesmaids, which has become the grail for a certain kind of female-friendship comedy.

== Notable individuals ==
=== Film directors ===
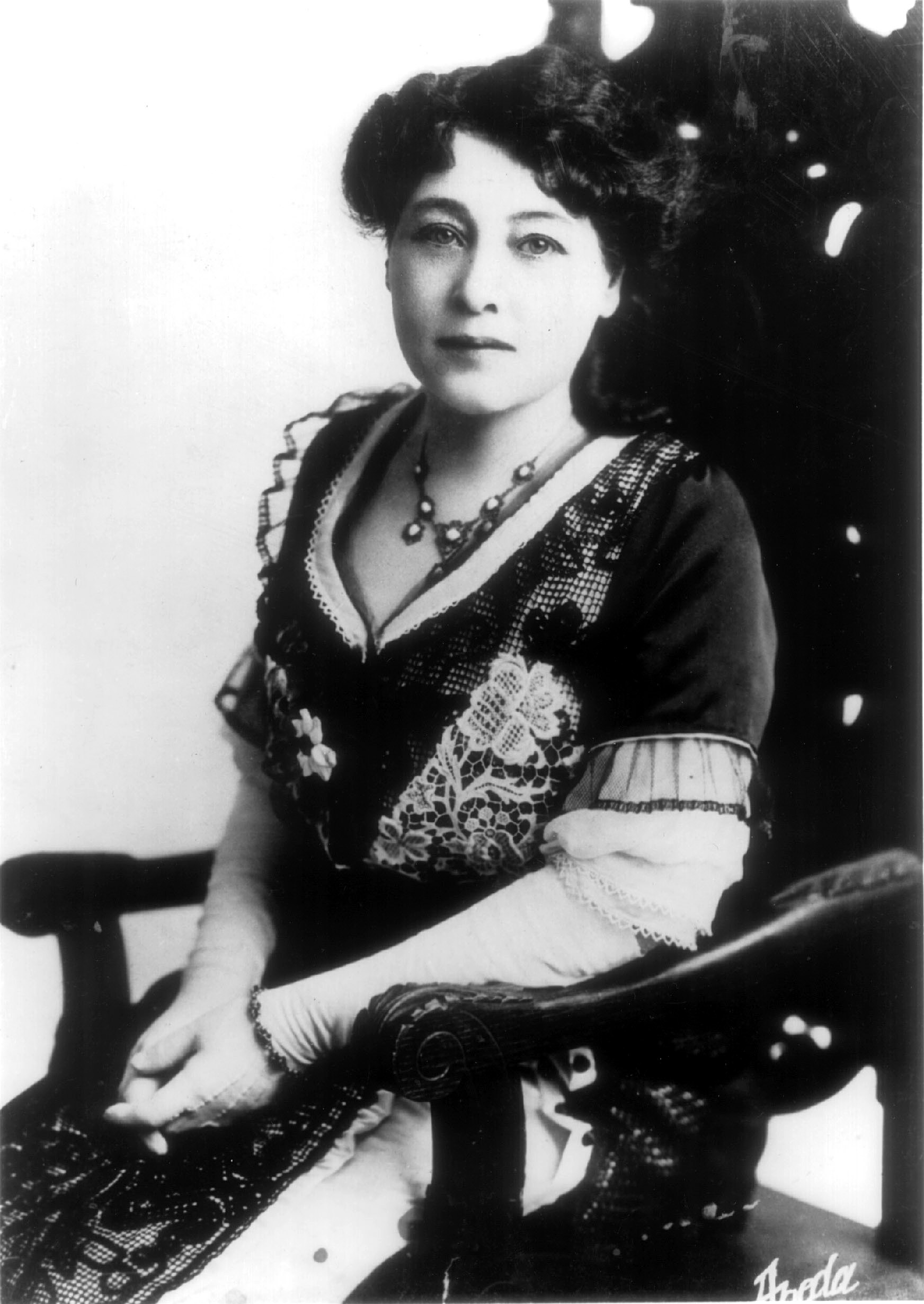
Alice Guy-Blaché was the first woman to direct a film.

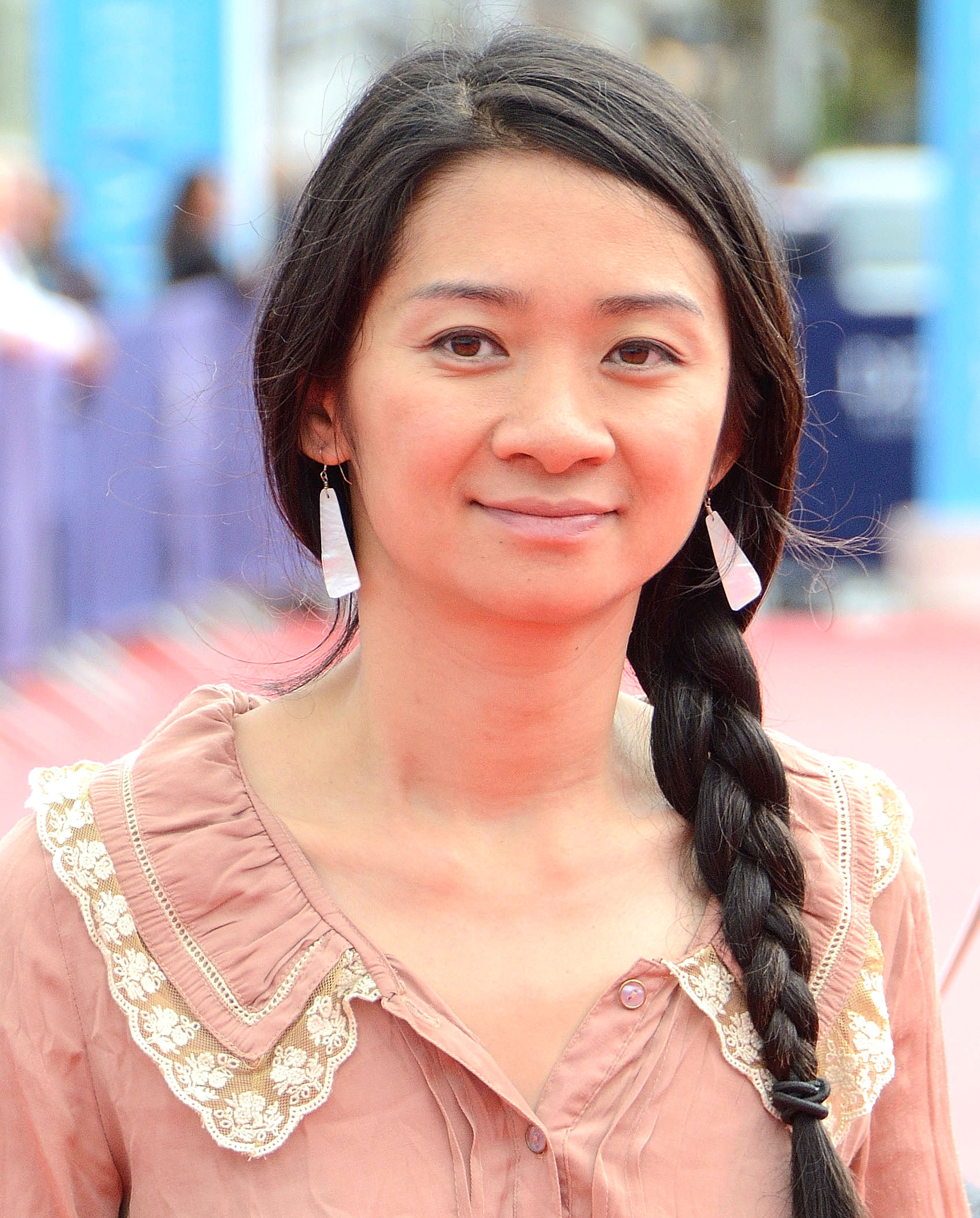
Chloé Zhao won both Best Picture and Best Director, becoming the second woman in history to win the latter after Kathryn Bigelow in 2010, and the first non-white woman to win the category.

According to Dr. Martha Lauzen, the executive director of the Center for the Study of Women in Television and Film, "If men are directing the vast majority of our films, the majority of those films will be about males from a male point of view." The female presence in filmmaking is more significant than just employment, it contributes to a greater cultural issue. Even though there is a huge gender disparity in filmmaking, there are notable exceptions, women who have figuratively broken through the celluloid ceiling and become pioneers in their field. Kathryn Bigelow, Jane Campion, Gina Prince-Bythewood, Claire Denis, Sofia Coppola, Catherine Hardwick, Amy Heckerling, Julie Taymor, and Nora Ephron are some significant female names in filmmaking today and in history.

- Alice Guy-Blaché is considered to be the first ever female film director, as well as the first director of a fiction film. Blaché directed her first film in 1896, La Fée aux Choux and founded Solax Studios in 1910. Over her lifetime, "she directed between 40 to 50 films and supervised nearly 300 other productions".
- Kathryn Bigelow is an American film director, producer, screenwriter, and television director. She became the first woman to win an Academy Award for Best Director for The Hurt Locker, the Directors Guild of America Award for Outstanding Directing, the BAFTA Award for Best Direction, and the Critics' Choice Award for Best Director as well as the Saturn Award for Best Director.
- Jane Campion is a New Zealand film director, screenwriter, and producer. She is the second of five women directors to ever be nominated for an Academy Award for Best Director, and was the first female director to win the Palme d'Or, the most prestigious award at the Cannes Film Festival.
- Catherine Hardwicke is best known as the director of the teen vampire romance film Twilight, with the highest grossing opening weekend of $69.6 million, the highest-ever opening for a female director.
- Amy Heckerling is best known for the films Fast Times at Ridgemont High, European Vacation and Clueless. She has been awarded the Franklin J. Schaffner Medal from the American Film Institute as well as the Crystal Award from Women in Film (WIF).
- Patty Jenkins is best known for the film Wonder Woman (2017). The film grossed $821.9 million worldwide making it the fifth highest grossing DC superhero film.

In 2019, the BBC polled 368 film experts from 84 countries to name the 100 best films by women directors. The top three named were (in ascending order) Jeanne Dielman, 23 quai du Commerce, 1080 Bruxelles, directed by Chantal Akerman; Cléo from 5 to 7, directed by Agnès Varda; and The Piano, directed by Jane Campion. Varda was the most-named director, with six different films on the list.

=== Cinematographers ===
About 2% of cinematographers are women. Notable cinematographers include:

- Anna Foerster (born 1970) is a German-born cinematographer and director. She worked on the Day After Tomorrow, Æon Flux, Independence Day, Godzilla, Outlander TV series and Westworld.
- Sue Gibson (born 1952) is a British cinematographer and director of photography known for the film Mrs. Dalloway (1997). Gibson is also the first female member of the British Society of Cinematographers, and later became the first female president of the society in 2008.
- Nancy Schreiber (born 1949) is an American cinematographer known for her work on Chain of Desire, Dead Beat, The Celluloid Closet, November, and The Nines. During the 1990s, Schreiber was an adjunct professor at the American Film Institute and taught advanced cinematography. In 1995, she became an official member of the American Society of Cinematographers and was the fourth woman to join it. Throughout her career, Schreiber has been on the board of governors of the American Society of Cinematographers, a board member of the Women in Film Foundation, and a member of the Academy of Motion Picture Arts and Sciences. She won the Women in Film's Kodak Vision Award in 1997 and the Sundance Film Festival award for Excellence in Dramatic Cinematography in 2004 for her work on November.
- Rachel Morrison (born 1978) is the first woman to be nominated for an Academy Award for Best Cinematography for her work on the film Mudbound. She has also worked on such commercially and critically successful films such as Fruitvale Station (2013) and Black Panther (2018).

=== Studio executives ===
Amy Pascal is the Sony studio chief and is the only female head of a major studio. In 1988, Pascal joined Columbia Pictures; she left in 1994 and went to work for Turner Pictures as the president of the company. In her first years at Columbia she worked on films such as Groundhog Day, Little Women, and A League of Their Own. When Pascal first started her career she was the Vice President of production at 20th Century Fox in 1986–1987. Before Pascal joined Fox, she was a secretary for Tony Garnett who was an independent producer with Warner Bros.

== Organizations and awards ==
=== Alliance of Women Film Journalists ===
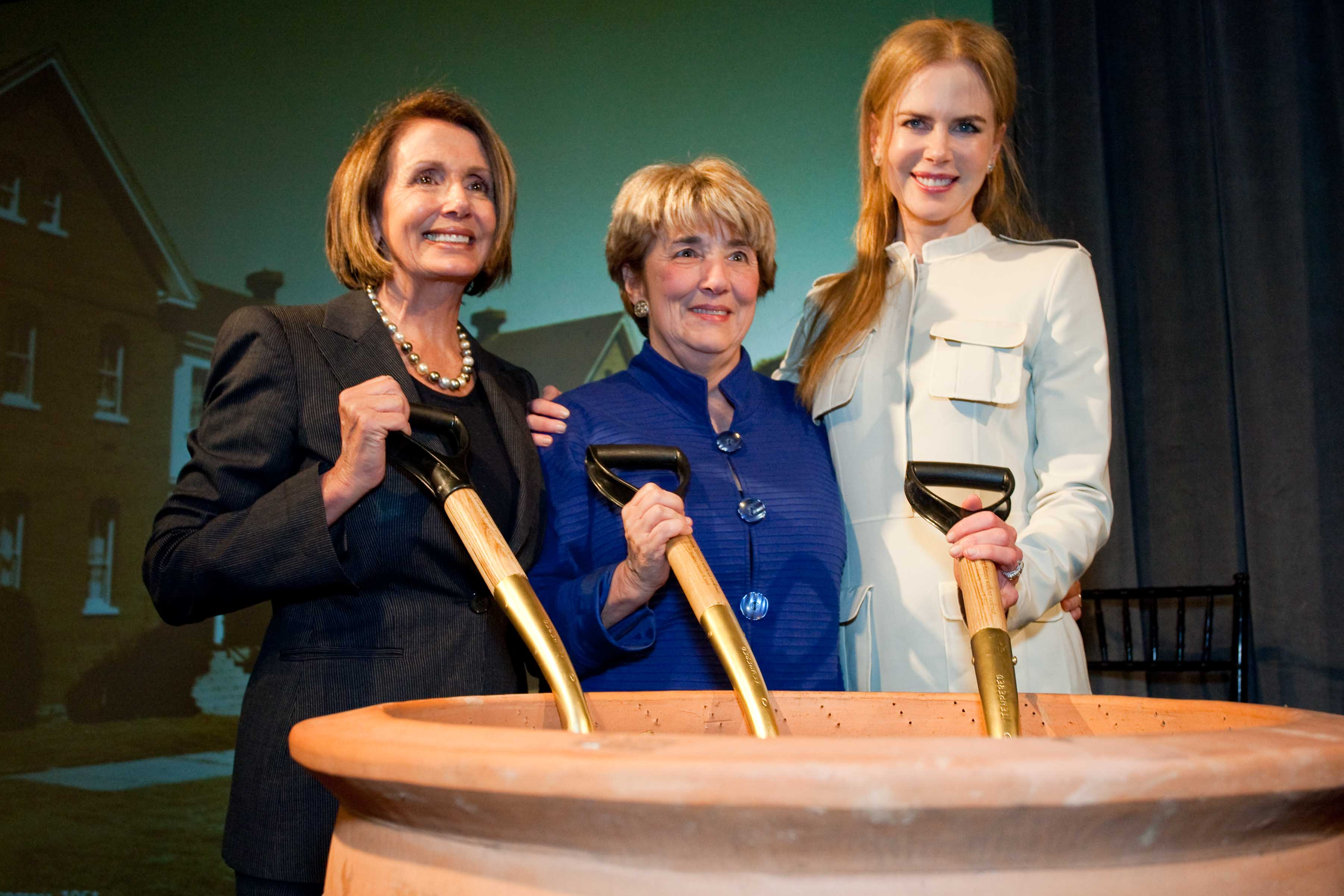
Nicole Kidman (right), with Nancy Pelosi (left) and Esta Soler (center) breaking ground on the International Center to End Violence in San Francisco

The Alliance of Women Film Journalists (AWFJ) is a non-profit founded in 2006 and based out of New York City, United States, dedicated to supporting work by and about women in the film industry. The AWFJ is composed of 76 professional female movie critics, journalist, and feature writers working in print, broadcast and online media. The British Film Institute describes the AWFJ as an organization that collects articles by its (mainly US-based) members, gives annual awards, and "supports films by and about women". Beginning in 2007, the group began giving annual awards to the best (and worst) in film, as voted on by its members. These awards have been reported on in recent years by number of mainstream media sources including TIME, USA Today, and Variety, and are also included in The New York Times' movie reviews awards lists.

In 2007, AWFJ released a Top 100 Films List in response to the American Film Institute revision of their 100 Years, 100 Films list. The AWFJ created their list to see if their members would come up with a substantially different list from AFI. In addition to awards for achievement granted regardless of gender, the AWFJ has "Female Focus Awards" (Best Woman Director, Best Woman Screenwriter, Kick Ass Award For Best Female Action Star, Best Animated Female, Best Breakthrough Performance, Best Newcomer, Women's Image Award, Hanging in There Award for Persistence, Actress Defying Age and Agism, Lifetime Achievement Award, Award for Humanitarian Activism, Female Icon Award, and This Year's Outstanding Achievement by a Woman in the Film Industry) and "EDA Special Mention Awards" (e.g., Most Egregious Age Difference Between Leading Man and Love Interest).

=== Geena Davis Institute on Gender in Media ===
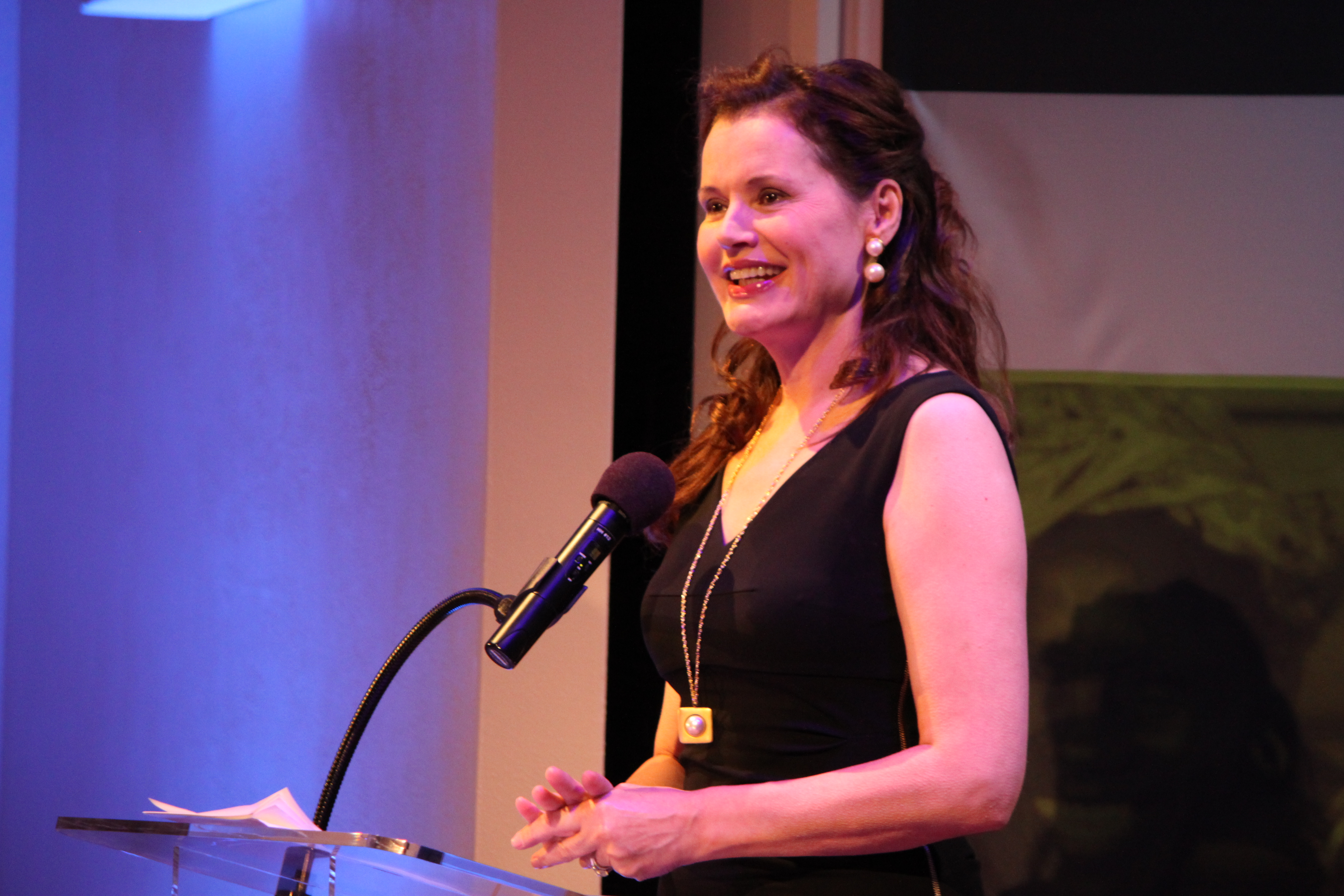
The Hollywood actress Geena Davis in a speech at the Millennium Development Goals Countdown event in the Ford Foundation Building in New York, addressing gender roles and issues in film (24 September 2013)

The Geena Davis Institute on Gender in Media is an organisation that has been lobbying the industry for years to expand the roles of women in film. The organization itself says they have the research spanning over 28+ years, on "gender prevalence in family entertainment". Some of their "key findings", from over the years include; "Gender Bias in Advertising", "Female Characters in Film and TV Motivate Women to Be More Ambitious, More Successful, and Courageous", "Representations of Women in STEM Characters in Media", and so much more.

=== New York Women in Film and Television ===
New York Women in Film & Television is a nonprofit membership organization for professional women in film, television and digital media. It works for women's rights, achievements and points of view in the film and television industry. It also educates media professionals and provides a network for the exchange of information and resources. It was founded in 1977 and brings together more than 2,000 professionals, including Emmy and Academy Award winners, who work in all areas of the entertainment industry. It is part of a network of 40 international Women in Film chapters, representing more than 10,000 members worldwide. It produces over 50 programs and special events annually; advocates for women in the industry; and, recognizes and encourages the contributions of women in the field.

=== Women Film Critics Circle ===
The Women Film Critics Circle is an association of 64 women film critics and scholars nationally and internationally, who are involved in print, radio, online and TV broadcast media. They united to form the first women critics organization in the United States, in the belief that women's perspectives and voices in film criticism would be recognized fully. The organization was founded in 2004. The Circle has made annual awards, the Women Film Critics Circle Awards, since 2004.

=== Women in Film ===
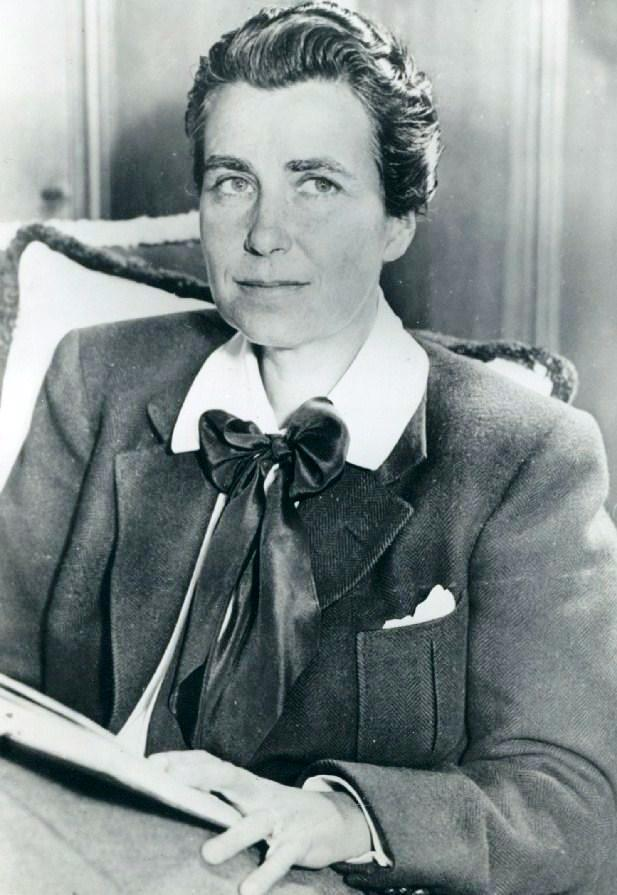
Dorothy Arzner was the first woman to join the Directors Guild of America and the first woman to direct a sound film.

Women in Film (WIF) is "a non-profit organization dedicated to helping women achieve their highest potential within the global entertainment, communications and media industries and to preserving the legacy of women within those industries. Founded in 1973, Women in Film and its Women in Film Foundation provide for members an extensive network of contacts, educational programs, scholarships, film finishing funds and grants, access to employment opportunities, mentorships and numerous practical services in support of this mission." WIF is a huge organization, offering bi-monthly networking breakfasts for women in the industry, internships, classes, competitions, a PSA production program, scholarships, and much more.

In 1977, the Crystal + Lucy Awards were first presented by the Women in Film Organization. The awards include the Crystal Award, the Lucy Award, the Dorothy Arzner Directors Award, the Max Mara Face of the Future Award, and the Kodak Vision Award. The same year, the Crystal Award was established to honor outstanding women who, through their endurance and the excellence of their work, have helped to expand the role of women within the entertainment industry.

Dorothy Arzner was the first woman member of the Directors Guild of America. The Dorothy Arzner Directors Award was established in her honor to recognize women directors. The Max Mara Face of the Future Award was inaugurated at the 2006 Crystal + Lucy Awards. This award is given to an actress who is experiencing a turning point in her career through her work in the entertainment industry and through her contributions to the community at large. The Kodak Vision Award is presented to a female filmmaker with outstanding achievements in cinematography, directing and/or producing, who also collaborates with and assists women in the entertainment industry. The Founder's Award was established at the Lucy Awards and was first presented to Tichi Wilkerson Kassel in 1996. The award is given in recognition of distinguished service to Women in Film. The Nancy Malone Directors Award recognizes emerging women directors who have demonstrated a passionate commitment to filmmaking. In 1992, the Women of Courage Award was established to recognize women who persevere through adverse conditions and circumstances in their quest for the rights of all women in the entertainment industry and society at large.

=== Women in Film and Television International ===
Women in Film and Television International (WIFTI) is a "global network comprised of over forty Women in Film chapters worldwide with over 10,000 members, dedicated to advancing professional development and achievement for women working in all areas of film, video and digital media". The organization was founded in 1973 in Los Angeles by Tichi Wilkerson Kassel and grew quickly worldwide, hosting their first Women in Film and Television International World Summit in New York City in September 1997.

=== Women's International Film and Arts Festival ===
The Women's International Film & Arts Festival (WIFF)is a "unique, cultural event featuring films, visual and performance arts and other artistic expressions by women". "Designed to promote women in the film industry and celebrate women's accomplishments, the festival consists of panel discussions, workshops, and symposia. WIFF's goals include empowering women of all ages to see themselves in a broader context."

=== WITASWAN and International SWAN Day ===
In 2002, Jan Lisa Huttner began an organization known as WITASWAN – Women in the Audience Supporting Women Artists Now, a grassroots movement to eliminate the celluloid ceiling. Combining efforts with the WomenArts Network, WITASWAN hosts and promotes International SWAN (Supporting Women Artists Now) Day annually, beginning in 2008. Over 700 celebrations worldwide take place on the last Saturday of March, bringing people together to celebrate women artists and filmmakers. The event is designed to promote awareness of women in film and the ways that people can support them by being educated film consumers.

=== Women Make Movies ===
Women Make Movies (WMM) is a "non-profit media arts organization which facilitates the production, promotion, distribution and exhibition of independent films and videotapes by and about women" based in New York City. WMM is a feminist media organization that focuses especially on the work of women of color. It is independent, receiving less than $100,000 a year from the government, and with its films all made by independent women artists.

Founded in 1969 by Ariel Dougherty and Sheila Page, WMM's first aimed to teach women about filmmaking. In 1972, it established training workshops in New York to introduce women to filmmaking, especially documentary. According to B. Ruby Rich, director of the film program at the New York State Council on the Arts (NYSCA) in 1981, "Documentary was the preferred mode for its ability to focus attention directly on issues of importance to women." Rich says that the organization emerged to help combat the problem of women's lives being misrepresented in films of the time.

In the late 1970s and early 1980s, WMM's focus shifted more toward the distribution of films made by women rather than just training. This change was led by Debra Zimmerman, the executive director of WMM since 1983. It came in response to the lack of distribution and presentation of films made by women in a male dominated field. Additionally, the organization was losing funding, but they were able to regain it through the help of Rich and the NYSCA with their new distribution program. The program originally focused on screenings in New York and the foundation of women's films festivals. Today, the distribution program is their primary work. WMM distributes its collection of more than 500 films to institutions such as colleges, galleries, museums, etc. The program "has been able to influence university curricula deeply and to advance the careers of women filmmakers whom it has taken under its wing."

As part of the distribution program, WMM is involved with international women's films festivals. It distributes films to countries that wish to exhibit women's films, which has helped start festivals in six to eight countries such as Monaco and Sierra Leone. Along with the distribution program, WMM also has a production program that offers resources and training to independent women filmmakers – they reach more than 400 filmmakers in 30 countries.

WMM's collection of films has grown from around 40 to now more than 500. It includes films and videos of diverse subject matter and often represents women of minorities such as lesbians or women with disabilities.

Overall, the goal of WMM is and has always been to represent independent women filmmakers as a response to the lack of women directors and filmmakers in Hollywood. It aims to combine politics and social problems with film theory to accurately depict the lives of women.

=== Studio D ===
In the early 1970s the National Film Board of Canada established Studio D, which was the first ever publicly funded female film production studio in the world. Studio D became the home, accommodating around six staff directors and home to many other producers and support staff. Approximately half of the studio's films were helmed by independent female directors from around the country. Over the next couple of decades, the filming studio would rise to success, earning three Academy Awards over that period. Historians have stated that despite the studio's success, women were still typically discouraged from making films or told that not thinking like a woman was best for making films. Women were also still paid significantly less than male counterparts. The studio also experienced issues with funding during the 1980s, as there were more women coming to the studio to look for work than the studio could afford to hire.

== Feminist film theory ==
Feminist film theory is theoretical film criticism derived from feminist politics and feminist theory. Feminists have many approaches to cinema analysis, regarding the film elements analyzed and their theoretical underpinnings. The development of feminist film theory was influenced by second wave feminism and the development of women's studies in the 1960s and 1970s. Feminist scholars began taking cues from the new theories arising from these movements to analyzing film. Initial attempts in the United States in the early 1970s were generally based on sociological theory and focused on the function of women characters in particular film narratives or genres and of stereotypes as a reflection of a society's view of women. Studies analyzed how the women portrayed in film related to the broader historical context, the stereotypes depicted, the extent to which the women were shown as active or passive, and the amount of screen time given to women. In contrast, film theoreticians in England began integrating perspectives based on critical theory and drawing inspiration from psychoanalysis, semiotics, and Marxism. Eventually these ideas gained hold within the American scholarly community in the later 1970s and 1980s. Analysis focused on they ways "cinematic production affect the representation of women and reinforce sexism".

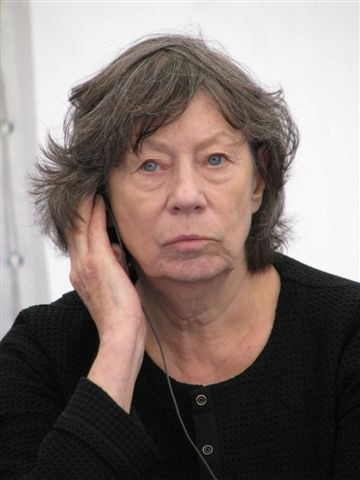
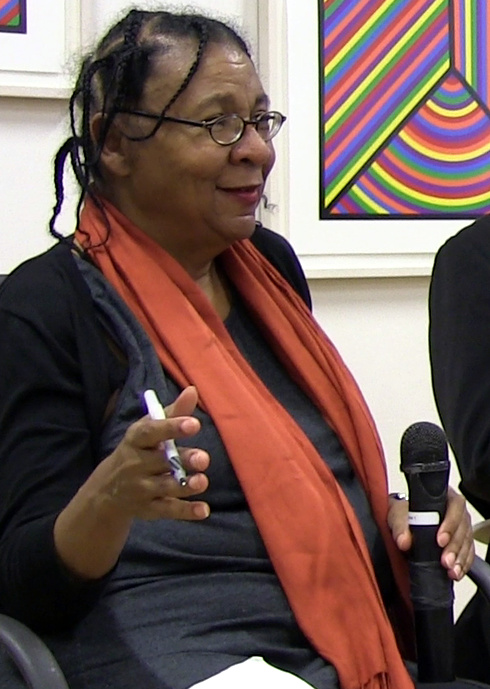
Theorist Laura Mulvey (left) developed the concept of male gaze within cinema. bell hooks (right) later proposed the idea of oppositional gaze.

In considering the way that films are put together, many feminist film critics have pointed to what they argue is the "male gaze" that predominates in classical Hollywood filmmaking. Budd Boetticher summarises the view thus: "What counts is what the heroine provokes, or rather what she represents. She is the one, or rather the love or fear she inspires in the hero, or else the concern he feels for her, who makes him act the way he does. In herself the woman has not the slightest importance." Laura Mulvey's influential essay "Visual Pleasure and Narrative Cinema" (written in 1973 and published in 1975) expands on this conception to argue that in cinema women are typically depicted in a passive role that provides visual pleasure through scopophilia, and identification with the on-screen male actor. She asserts: "In their traditional exhibitionist role women are simultaneously looked at and displayed, with their appearance coded for strong visual and erotic impact so that they can be said to connote to-be-looked-at-ness", and as a result contends that in film a woman is the "bearer of meaning, not maker of meaning". Mulvey argues that the psychoanalytic theory of Jacques Lacan is the key to understanding how film creates such a space for female sexual objectification and exploitation through the combination of the patriarchal order of society, and 'looking' in itself as a pleasurable act of voyeurism, as "the cinema satisfies a primordial wish for pleasurable looking".

Coming from a black feminist perspective, American scholar bell hooks put forth the notion of the "oppositional gaze", encouraging black women not to accept stereotypical representations in film, but rather actively critique them. Janet Bergstrom's article "Enunciation and Sexual Difference" (1979) uses Sigmund Freud's ideas of bisexual responses, arguing that women are capable of identifying with male characters and men with women characters, either successively or simultaneously. Miriam Hanson, in "Pleasure, Ambivalence, Identification: Valentino and Female Spectatorship" (1984) put forth the idea that women are also able to view male characters as erotic objects of desire. In "The Master's Dollhouse: Rear Window", Tania Modleski argues that Hitchcock's film, Rear Window, is an example of the power of male gazer and the position of the female as a prisoner of the "master's dollhouse".

In films, there are power levels between male and female characters, and according to Jean-Anne Sutherland, a Sociology professor at UNCW, there are specific types of power structures in film. The different types are; power-over, power-to, and power-with. Power-over, when referring to a female character having "power-over", a male character, has the female character being portrayed as having more "masculine", in their physical appearance or interactions. This can be shown more in social class and race, and most of the time this is seen in "working class black and white women". Power-to, or "empowerment and resistance", can be seen in films mainly about overcoming obstacles and going against "social norms". Films that display "power-to", mostly have middle and working class white women at the center of the story. Power-with, show an equal balance of power, or male and female characters working with each other rather than against each other.

== Bechdel test ==
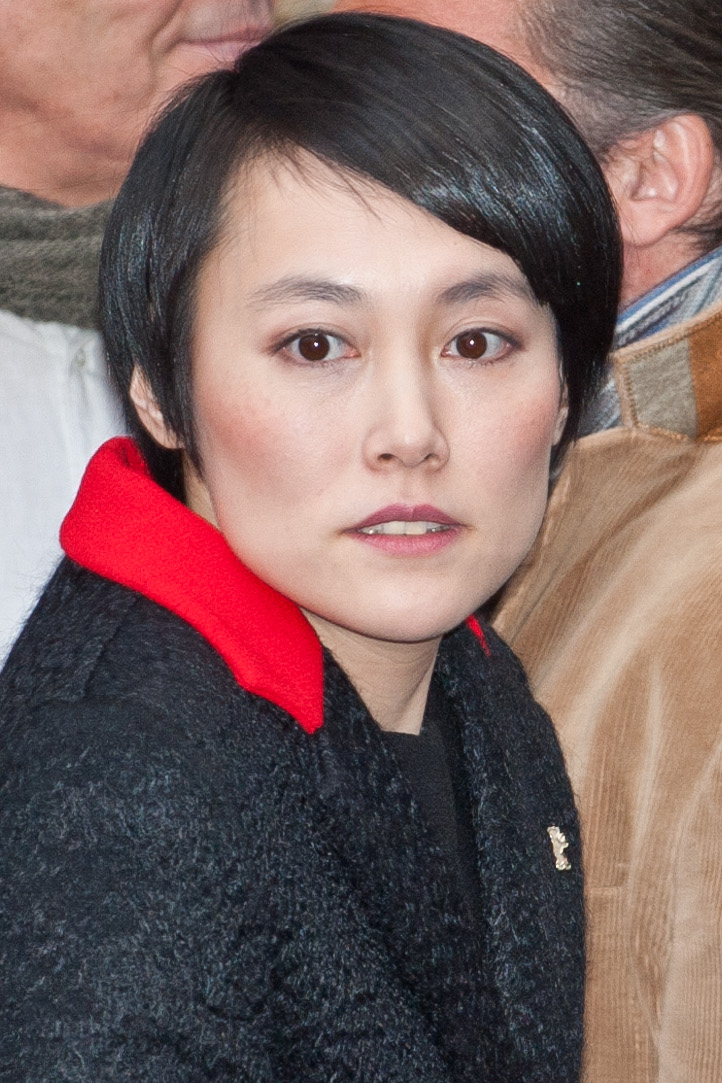
The character Mako Mori from Pacific Rim by Guillermo del Toro (played by Rinko Kikuchi, pictured) inspired an alternative test for measuring female presence in fiction the Mako Mori test.

The Bechdel test, originating in 1985 from the comic strip "Dykes to Watch Out For" by Allison Bechdel, is an approach to observing the representation of women in popular film. Bechdel attributes the idea to Liz Wallace and has said the test should be called the "Bechdel-Wallace test. To pass the test, films must have at least two women who talk to each other, and the women must talk about something other than a man. The requirement that the two women must be named characters, rather than generic stock characters (e.g., "girlfriend", "groupie", etc.) is sometimes added. Only about half of all films meet these requirements, according to user-edited film databases and media industry press. The test is used as an indicator for the active presence of women in films and other fiction, and to call attention to gender inequality in fiction due to sexism. A study of gender portrayals in 855 of the most financially successful U.S. films from 1950 to 2006 showed that there were, on average, two male characters for each female character, a ratio that remained stable over time.

Female characters were portrayed as being involved in sex twice as often as male characters, and their proportion of scenes with explicit sexual content increased over time. Violence increased over time in male and female characters alike. According to a 2014 study by the Geena Davis Institute on Gender in Media, in 120 films made worldwide from 2010 to 2013, only 31% of named characters were female, and 23% of the films had a female protagonist or co-protagonist. 7% of directors are women. Another study looking at the 700 top‐grossing films from 2007 to 2014 found that only 30% of the speaking characters were female.

In 2013, four Swedish cinemas and the Scandinavian cable television channel Viasat Film incorporated the Bechdel test into some of their ratings, a move supported by the Swedish Film Institute. In 2014, the European cinema fund Eurimages incorporated the Bechdel test into its submission mechanism as part of an effort to collect information about gender equality in its projects. It requires "a Bechdel analysis of the script to be supplied by the script readers". A 2016 study by Andrew M. Linder, Melissa Lindquist, and Julie Arnold examined box office performance of movies that pass the Bechdel test. They found that, of the most popular movies from the 2000s, a little less than half passed the Bechdel test, and these films made less than those that failed the test. They attributed this difference to a discrepancy in production budgets between the two groups, with less funding for movies that did pass the Bechdel test.

The website bechdeltest.com is a user-edited database of some 4,500 films classified by whether or not they pass the test, with the added requirement that the women must be named characters. As of January 2023, it listed 57% of these films as passing all three of the test's requirements, 22% as failing one, 10% as failing two, and 11% as failing all three.

== See also ==
- Women Film Pioneers Project
- Créteil International Women's Film Festival

Women

- Women in music
- Women in dance
- Women artists
- Women in documentary film
