= Quest: A Feminist Quarterly =

American feminist journal from 1974 until 1982

Quest
- Front cover of Quest's first issue (Summer 1974). Image retrieved from Internet Archive.
- Format: Journal (Print)
- Publisher: Quest: a feminist quarterly, Inc.
- First issue: Summer 1974
- Final issue: 1982
- Country: United States
- Based in: Washington, D.C.
- Language: English
- ISSN: 0098-955X
- OCLC: 2242837

Quest: A Feminist Quarterly was an American feminist journal published in Washington, D.C. from 1974 until 1982. Founded by Charlotte Bunch, Dolores Bargowski, Mary Helen Mautner, Emily Medvec, Juanita Weaver, and many others, the journal published articles and essays devoted to the feminist movement. The publication was primarily aimed toward feminist academics, theorists, and analysts—but it also pursued to include women who wanted to learn more about the feminist movement.

Each issue dealt with different themes and topics such as "Money, Fame, and Power," "Race, Class, & Culture," and "Body Politic."

Most of the journal's staff were unpaid volunteers. Quest, like other feminist publications such as Sojourner and The Second Wave, ceased publication after years of financial struggle.
