= Women of Faith (film) =

- Directed by: Rebecca M. Alvin
- Distributed by: Women Make Movies
- Release date: 2009

Women of Faith is a 2009 documentary by Rebecca M. Alvin, which examines women's decisions to lead religious lives in the Roman Catholic tradition in the post-feminist era. It asks the question, "why would a woman choose a nun's life today?"

Individual interviews with seven women provide answers - and explore how rebellion can happen within and outside the Church, how women in the Church reconcile conflicting, religious, personal, and political beliefs, and how they view official Church positions on contraception, homosexuality, and women's ordination as priests. The diverse group includes Poor Clares, contemplative nuns who spend most of their days in prayer, Maryknolls who have served in Central America, a lesbian former nun, and a Roman Catholic Womanpriest.

The film is distributed by Women Make Movies.

== Later documentary ==
In 2020, a separate documentary was released by Angela Heath, named Women of Faith: Coping with Trauma.
