= Kathryn Kolbert =

Kathryn Kolbert is the Co-Founder and Producing Director of the Athena Film Festival and served as the Founding Director of the Athena Center for Leadership Studies from 2009 - 2018. She is a former president of People for the American Way and the People for the American Way Foundation.

== Biography ==
Kolbert graduated from the Kingswood School Cranbrook in 1970, received her Bachelor of Arts from Cornell University's School of Arts and Sciences in 1974, and graduated cum laude from Temple University School of Law in 1977.

Before she became a journalist, Kolbert was a public interest attorney specializing in women's reproductive rights. From 1979 to 1988, she was a Staff Attorney with the Women's Law Project and Community Legal Services in Philadelphia. Kolbert served as the State Coordinating Counsel of the American Civil Liberty Union's Reproductive Freedom Project in New York City from 1988 to 1992. Between 1992 and 1997, she directed domestic litigation and public policy programs for the Center for Reproductive Law and Policy, where she was Co-Founder and Vice President.

In 1992, Kolbert argued before the United States Supreme Court in Planned Parenthood v. Casey, a case about a constitutional challenge to a Pennsylvania law regulating abortion, in which the court considered whether to overturn Roe v. Wade. The court upheld most of the law at issue but reaffirmed Roe's "central holding" on abortion rights.

From 1998 to 2008, Kolbert oversaw a program on law and American life at the University of Pennsylvania's Annenberg Public Policy Center. She was the Executive Producer of Justice Talking, a radio program distributed by National Public Radio, and directed an educational website called JusticeLearning.org, which received a Webby Award in 2005.

Prior to working at Barnard, Kolbert spent a year in Washington, D.C. as president and CEO of the People for the American Way and People for the American Way Foundation. She resigned as president and CEO on April 3, 2009.

== Awards and honors ==
Kolbert has been recognized by the National Law Journal as one of the "100 Most Influential Lawyers in America," and by the American Lawyer as one of 45 public-interest lawyers "whose vision and commitment are changing lives." In 2011, Kolbert received the Edith I. Spivack Award from the New York County Lawyers' Association's Women's Rights Committee.
