= Anne Thompson (film journalist) =

American journalist

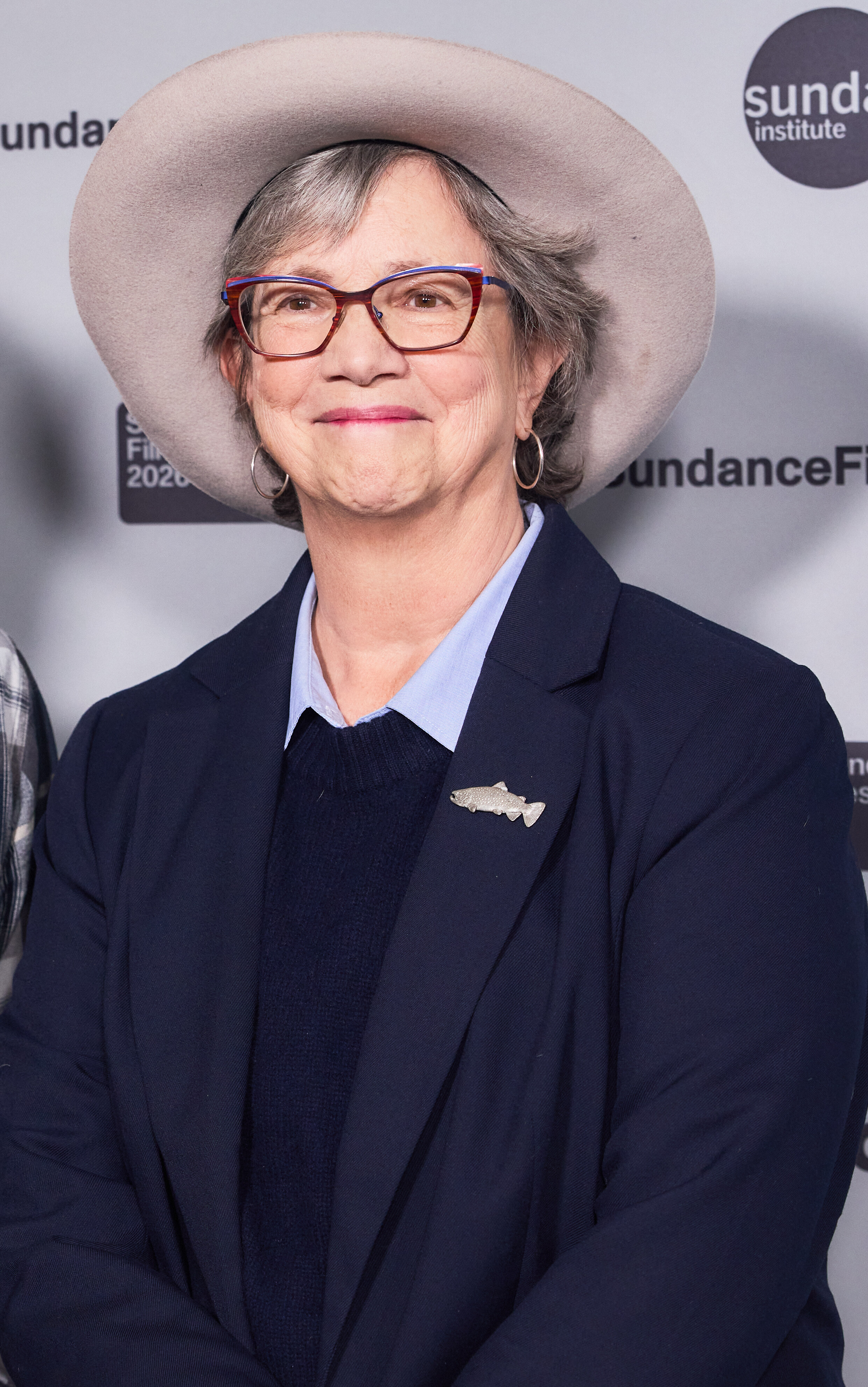
Anne Thompson in 2026

Anne Thompson is an American journalist covering film and television. She is Editor-at-Large at IndieWire and founder of the Thompson on Hollywood blog.

== Career ==
Thompson was born and raised in New York City. She is a graduate of the Department of Cinema Studies at New York University. Her writing has appeared in various publications, such as The New York Times, The Washington Post, The Observer and Wired. Thompson covered behind-the-scenes Hollywood as a senior writer at Entertainment Weekly and as West Coast Editor for Film Comment.

From 1981 to 1984, she was a unit publicist on films such as Terms of Endearment and The Adventures of Buckaroo Banzai Across the 8th Dimension. From 1985 to 1993, she wrote the film industry column "Risky Business" for LA Weekly, a column that was distributed by the Los Angeles Times Syndicate. She was the West Coast Editor of Premiere from 1996 to 2002, and served as the Deputy Film Editor at The Hollywood Reporter from January 2005 to March 2007, where she launched the publication's first blog, RiskyBiz. She then served as a film columnist at Variety and deputy editor of Variety.com, where she started Thompson on Hollywood in March 2007. After leaving Variety in 2009, Thompson relaunched Thompson on Hollywood as part of IndieWire.

In December 2006, Thompson co-hosted Ebert & Roeper, as Roger Ebert was still recovering from illness. In February 2011, she received an Athena Film Festival Award for her distinguished reporting and commentary about women and film.

She taught the fall semester of "Sneak Previews" for UCLA Extension until the series shut down during the pandemic. Her book The $11 Billion Year was published by HarperCollins in 2014.

Thompson participated in the 2012 Sight & Sound critics' poll, where she listed her ten favorite films as follows: The Apartment (1960), Bringing Up Baby (1938), A Clockwork Orange (1971), High and Low (1963), I Know Where I'm Going! (1945), The Lady Eve (1941), Lawrence of Arabia (1962), Meet Me in St. Louis (1944), Rio Grande (1950), The Wild Bunch (1969).
