= Dolores Bargowski =

American feminist and lesbian activist

- Born: 1943; Detroit, Michigan
- Died: 2008 (aged 64–65)
- Education: Monteith College (WSU)
- Occupations: Feminist, lesbian activist
- Years active: 1967-1970s
- Era: Second-wave feminism

Dolores Bargowski (1943–2008) was an American feminist and lesbian activist active in the early years of second-wave feminism.

== Life and career ==
=== Early career ===
Her political involvement began in student government as a student at Monteith College, Wayne State University, where she was the president of the college's student government in 1967. Dissatisfied with sexism leading groups of the civil rights movement era, such as the Students for a Democratic Society, she led one of the first student-led seminars on women's issues in the country, Society in Women. This seminar would lead into the foundation for the first college chapter of the National Organization for Women.

=== Activism ===
In 1969, she moved to New York City, co-founded Women Make Movies with Ariel Dougherty and Sheila Paige. While there, she became involved with The Feminists and Radicalesbians, writing frequently for both organizations. She participated in the first-ever New York City LGBT Pride March in 1970 (then known as the Christopher Street Gay Liberation March) and in the Miss America protest held in Atlantic City, New Jersey.

She moved in 1971 to Washington, D.C., to join a lesbian-feminist collective in the area. She wrote for The Furies Collective's newspaper and was a founder of Quest, a feminist literary journal. There, she also wrote and distributed the pamphlet, Notes Toward a Women's Analysis of Class.

Her papers were acquired by Harvard Library in 2008 from her.
