= Celluloid ceiling =

Underrepresentation of women in Hollywood

The celluloid ceiling is a metaphor for the underrepresentation of women in hiring and employment in Hollywood. The term is a play on the metaphor of the "glass ceiling", which describes an invisible barrier that keeps a given demographic (typically women, although the term can apply to any protected group) from rising beyond a certain level in a hierarchy. Celluloid refers to the material used to make the film stock that was once used to make motion pictures. The term is usually applied to behind the screen workers only.

== The Celluloid Ceiling Report ==
Comparison between the employment of men and women in behind-the-scenes roles in Hollywood over time, according to the comprehensive 25-year edition of the Celluloid Ceiling Report., published in 2023.

The celluloid ceiling is also the title of a series of reports created by Dr. Martha Lauzen at the Center for the Study of Women in Television and Film at San Diego State University. These reports have been compiled since 1998 to track employment statistics for women in Hollywood. The reports focus on behind the screen creative positions, also called above-the-line positions. These include: director, writer, producer, executive producer, editors, and cinematographers. As of 2018 the Center has yet to cultivate statistics on below-the-line (craft) positions. The Celluloid Ceiling reports have been produced since 1998.

The 2017 Celluloid Ceiling report tracked employment statistics for top 100, 250, and 500 grossing non-reissue Hollywood films. The delineation of top 100 films and top 500 films are recent additions to the Center's data collection; the most complete historical data for comparison is from the top 250 category. For the top 250 films the report found that women account for 18% of all directors, writers, producers, executive producers, editors, and cinematographers employed. This breaks down as:

- 25% of producers
- 19% of executive producers
- 16% of editors
- 11% of writers
- 11% of directors
- 4% of cinematographers

Statistically, these numbers show that "only 1% of films employed 10 or more women in the above roles. In contrast, 70% of films employed 10 or more men."

The Media and Social Change Initiative at the University of Southern California’s Annenberg School for Communication and Journalism also reported on the state of women and minorities in the film industry in front of and behind the screen. Their report, however, focuses mainly on gender representation on screen.

== Working Conditions ==
While employment for women working behind the screen in Hollywood is statistically low, reports of hostile and discriminatory working conditions have been widely circulated. In 2016 the media company EPIX produced twelve short documentary films with leading directors and producers, both men and woman, articulating the many prejudices, stereotypes, and myths that face women working in Hollywood. The website Shit People Say to Women Directors (& Other Women in Film) has become a repository of stories describing the regularized harassment women in the film industry face. The intersection of harassment and working conditions was explicitly manifest during Hollywood's #MeToo movement, when multiple women described being harassed or abused by men during job interviews or while working in Hollywood.

== ACLU/EEOC Investigation ==
Based on "A large body of statistical evidence reveals dramatic disparities in the hiring of women directors in film and television," the American Civil Liberties Union (ACLU) of Southern California and the Women's Rights Project of ACLU National sent letters to the California Department of Fair Employment and Housing, the U.S. Equal Employment Opportunity Commission (EEOC), and the Office of Federal Contract Compliance Programs asking that each entity open an investigation to the discrimination in hiring and underemployment of women directors in film and television. The fifteen page letters, sent in May 2015, explicated five foundational roadblocks facing women directors:

- "studios’, networks’, and producers’ intentional and discriminatory failure to recruit, consider, and hire qualified women directors
- use of discriminatory recruiting and screening practices that have the effect of shutting women out, such as word-of-mouth recruiting and use of short lists on which women are under-represented;
- reliance on, and perpetuation of, sex stereotyping in hiring and evaluation of women;
- ineffective programs within the industry to increase hiring of women and people of color that do not lead to women getting directing jobs;
- lack of enforcement of internal industry agreements to increase the hiring of women and people of color."

In October 2015 the EECO began "contacting female directors to investigate gender discrimination in Hollywood. In February 2017 it was reported that the EEOC was in discussions with all major Hollywood studios to resolve systemic discrimination of women directors in hiring and employment. While the EEOC investigation concerned women directors, changes in hiring and employment practices can impact women in Hollywood across positions.

== Advocacy to End the Celluloid Ceiling ==
A number of organizations have taken actions to highlight the contributions of women directors and advocate for their hiring. Vulture released an expansive list of 100 working women directors available for hire. The popular blog Cinema Fanatic chronicled the process of spending a year watching only films directed or co-directed by women, while challenging others to do the same. The campaign took off on Twitter with the #AYearWithWomen and helped to start critical dialogue and increase awareness around a much wider-variety of women directors. A similar campaign is currently promoted by Women in Film Los Angeles. Called #52FilmsByWomen, the group asks the public to pledge to watch a film directed by women every week for one year; they currently have over 13,000 commitment pledges. Women in Film Los Angeles has also partnered with the Sundance Institute "launched Female Filmmakers Initiative to foster gender parity for women behind the camera." The joint effort funds research on women's directorial hiring in Hollywood, resources for funding, and maintains an extensive list of allied organizations.

Film Fatales—a nationwide network of women directors dedicated to collaboration, support, and advocacy—released a highly publicized list of film directed by women. Film Fatales also works with film festivals to help them expand their roster of women-directed entries. The non-profit Alliance of Women Directors, whose mission revolves around education, support and advocacy for women directors in the entertainment industry, provides events, workshops, networking, and in-house shadowing programs for women directors. The organization Directed by Women maintains a publicly accessible archive of over 12,000 women directors on their website.

Other groups working to raise awareness and promote women working in Hollywood include Women in Film and Television International, the Geena Davis Institute on Gender in Media, and Women and Hollywood.

== See also ==
- Glass ceiling
- Miss Representation
- Androcentrism
- Women in film
