= Athena Film Festival =

Annual film festival in New York, New York, U.S.

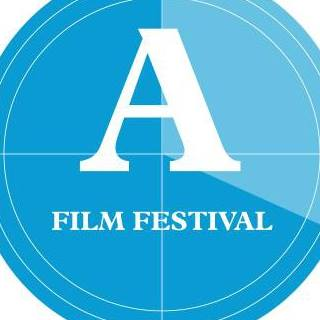
- Location: New York City, New York, U.S.
- Founded: 2011
- Website: http://athenafilmfestival.com/

The Athena Film Festival is an annual film festival held at Barnard College of Columbia University in New York City. The festival takes place in February and focuses on films celebrating women and leadership. In addition to showing films, the festival hosts filmmaker workshops, master classes and panels on a variety of topics relevant to women in the film industry. The Athena Film Festival was co-founded by Kathryn Kolbert, Founding Director of the Athena Center for Leadership Studies at Barnard College and Melissa Silverstein, founder of the Women and Hollywood initiative and the festival's Artistic Director.

The tenth annual Athena Film Festival was held from February 27-March 1, 2020.

== Awards ==
Each year, awards are granted to individuals who have made a significant impact in their industry over the course of their career. In 2012, The Laura Ziskin Lifetime Achievement Award was created in honor of the late Laura Ziskin, a noted producer and breast cancer advocate.

=== Winners ===
==== 2011 ====
- Leslie Bennetts, contributing editor at Vanity Fair
- Debra Martin Chase, producer
- Abigail Disney, documentary filmmaker
- Delia Ephron, screenwriter
- Greta Gerwig, actress
- Debra Granik, director
- Tanya Hamilton, director
- Chris Hegedus, documentary filmmaker
- Gini Reticker, documentary filmmaker
- Anne Rosellini, screenwriter and producer
- Nancy Schreiber, cinematographer
- Anne Thompson, writer
- Debra Zimmerman, executive director of Women Make Movies

==== 2012 ====
- Laura Ziskin, accepted by her daughter Julia Barry (Laura Ziskin Lifetime Achievement Award)
- Nekisa Cooper, producer
- The Fempire: Diablo Cody, Dana Fox, Liz Meriwether, and Lorene Scafaria
- Rachael Horovitz, producer
- Theresa Rebeck, author and playwright
- Dee Rees, director
- Julie Taymor, film and Broadway director

==== 2013 ====
- Gale Anne Hurd, producer (Laura Ziskin Lifetime Achievement Award)
- Ava DuVernay, director and distributor
- Molly Haskell, film critic
- Rose Kuo, (former) executive director of Film Society of Lincoln Center
- Pat Mitchell, president of the Paley Center for Media

==== 2014 ====
- Sherry Lansing, former studio executive and philanthropist (Laura Ziskin Lifetime Achievement Award)
- Callie Khouri, director and screenwriter
- Kasi Lemmons, director
- Keri Putnam, executive director of the Sundance Institute

==== 2015 ====
- Jodie Foster, actress and director (Laura Ziskin Lifetime Achievement Award)
- Sheila Nevins, president of HBO Documentary Films
- Gina Prince-Bythewood, director
- Cathy Schulman, producer

==== 2016 ====
- Mira Nair, Laura Ziskin Lifetime Achievement Award
- Geralyn Dreyfous, Athena Award
- Karyn Kusama, Athena Award
- Jeanine Tesori, Athena Award
- Paul Feig, Leading Man Award
- Suffragette, Ensemble Award
- Kate McKinnon, presenter

==== 2017 ====
- Eve Ensler, playwright, activist, performer and author
- Patricia Riggen, director
- Regina K. Scully, producer
- David Oyelowo, actor, leading man award

== Athena List ==
In 2014, the festival announced the first edition of the Athena List, created to highlight finished, unproduced screenplays featuring roles with female leaders. The list is based on the concept of the popular Hollywood Black List, with a gender-conscious angle.

=== Selected scripts ===
==== 2014 ====
- On the Basis of Sex by Daniel Stiepleman recounts Supreme Court Justice Ruth Bader Ginsburg’s early years.
- The Good Years by Rachel Feldman and Adam Prince, a biopic of Lilly Ledbetter.
- The Sky's the Limit: The Story of the Mercury 13 by Maria Burton, Gabrielle Burton, Ursula Burton and Jennifer Burton, a film about a group of female astronauts who were denied the chance to go into space
- Audrey’s Run by Emily Abt, about an African-American woman running to become Boston's next mayor

==== 2015 ====
- Dickey Chapelle by Margaret Nagle, about a war photographer known as "The Patron Saint of the Marines"
- Highsmith by Eliza Lee, a biopic of Patricia Highsmith focusing on her struggle with alcoholism during the McCarthy era and the anonymous publishing of the iconic lesbian novel The Price of Salt.
- What the World Will Look Like When all the Water Leaves Us by Jenny Halper, based on the prize-winning short story by Laura Van Den Berg about a female scientist and her teenage daughter as she fights to save endangered species

==== 2016 ====
- "A Noble Affair" by Anil Baral and Kathryn Maughan
- "In the Land of Fire and Ice" by David MacGregor
- "Ride the Wind" by Denise Meyers
- "Virginia" by Bess Wohl

==== 2017 ====
- "Claude" by Hannah Patterson
- "Clemency" by Chinonye Chukwu
- "Mrs. Christie" by Jamie Dawson
- "Scott" by Anna Rose Moore

==== 2018 ====
- True North by Katherine Ruppe
- Throw Like A Girl By Lori Bell Leahy
- Saving Esperanza by Betty Sullivan
- WHITE by A. Sayeeda Moreno

==== 2019 ====
- Hedy by Giovanni Porta
- Out of My Mind by Daniel Stiepleman
- Roe v. Wade by Jennifer Majka
- The Defining Moment by Margaret Nagle

==== 2020 ====
- Auto High by Nina Kentsis
- Good Chance [Formerly Mother-Daughter] by Tricia Lee
- Noor By Nijla Mu’min
- Over It by Joy Goodwin
- What the Eyes Don’t See by Cherien Dabis

==== 2022 ====
- Sunflower: The Fannie Lou Hamer Story by Aunjanue Ellis
- The Gatekeeper by Jennifer Vanderbes
- Ray of Life by Kate Sheffield
