= Martha Lauzen =

American academic

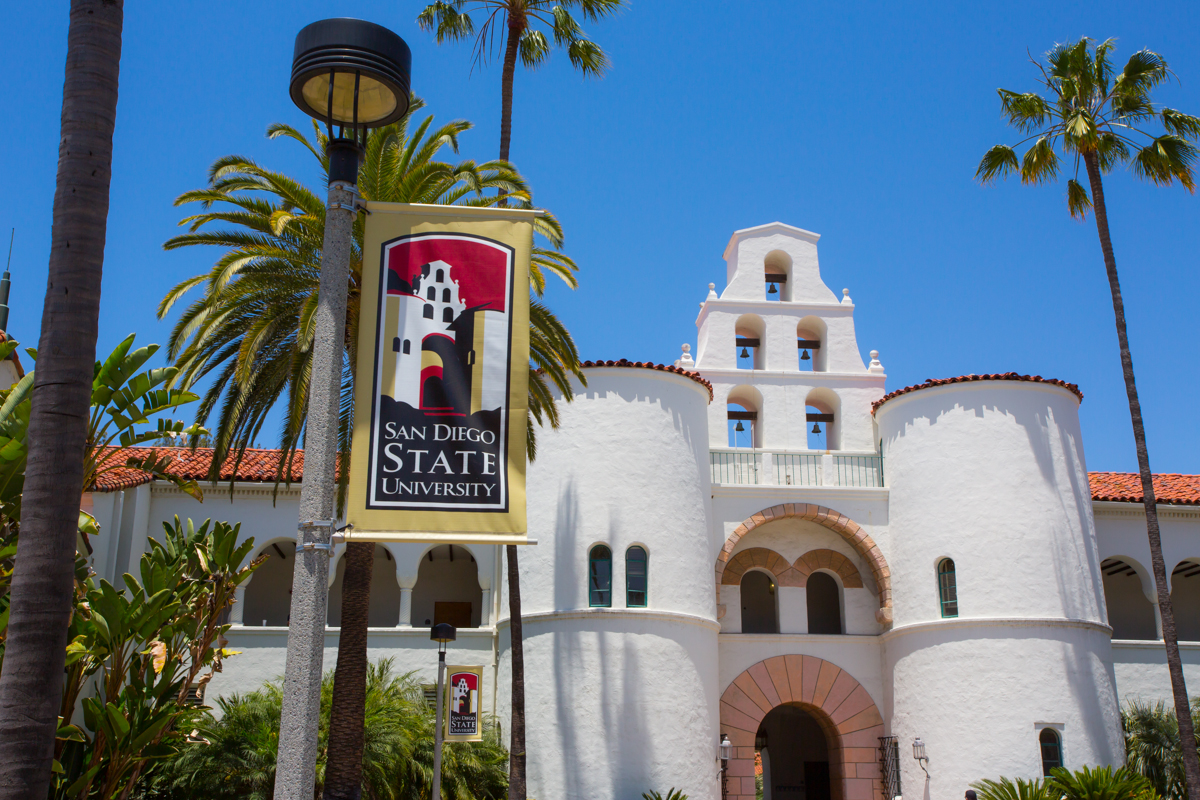
San Diego State University, the location of the Center for the Study of Women in Television and Film.

Martha M. Lauzen is an American academic and researcher in the field of women in film.

== Biography ==
Lauzen holds a doctorate from the University of Maryland and M.A. and B.A. degrees from the University of Iowa. She is the executive director of the Center for the Study of Women in Television and Film and a professor of film and television at San Diego State University. Her Center conducts research on different aspects of women in film, working both on screen and behind the scenes, which has contributed to an emphasis on diversifying Hollywood. Lauzen is the author and creator of these annual studies analyzing information regarding women working in film (The Celluloid Ceiling) and television (Boxed In), as well as articles examining women's employment patterns and representation in the industry. Organizations such as the ACLU and California State Assembly have used the center's findings to make the case for greater employment of women in film and television.
