= Ariel Maria Dougherty =

American filmmaker (born 1947)

- Born: May 21, 1947 (age 79)

Ariel Maria Dougherty (born May 21, 1947) is an American independent film maker, feminist media advocate and activist. She is best known as the co-founder of non-profit media arts organization Women Make Movies. In recent years she has written extensively about the intersections of women's rights and media justice and the need for increased support for both.

== Career ==
=== Women Make Movies ===
Dougherty along with Sheila Paige and Delores Bargowski initiated Women Make Movies out of citywide Women's Liberation weekly meetings in the Fall of 1969. Between then and early 1973 under the banner of WMM they produced four films. Bargowski moved from NYC after shooting the second film.

At the start of 1972 Paige and Dougherty unified their youth film teaching work with their feminist media vision, incorporating Women Make Movies as an education, not-for-profit organization. They established a community-based workshop for women of all ages in the racially and economically mixed Chelsea neighborhood in New York City. Distribution was started as a vital earned income arm. Under Dougherty's leadership WMM's carriage hay-loft became a meeting hub for filmmakers from other parts of the US and the globe traveling through NYC. During this period WMM added the London Women's Film Group's The Amazing Equal Pay Show (1974) and Australian films, A Film for Discussion (1973) made by the Sydney Women's Film Group and The Roof Needs Mowing (1971), to their distribution collection. These, the workshop films and earlier WMM productions screened at women's film festivals, in women's studies and cinema programs, and at community events across the US and at international festivals. Dougherty and women from other women's media groups in New York City organized the February 1975 Conference of Feminist Film and Video Organizations. Coordinated with a sister conference in LA, numerous initiatives emerged: The National Women's Film Circuit; International videoletters; and a womanifesto for feminist filmmaking.

In the late Spring of 1976, the educational film that Dougherty produced, Healthcaring was released by WMM. An award-winning documentary, this fresh community-woman focused film sustained WMM through a number of hard years and remains, to this day, active in WMM's distribution collection. Dougherty and Paige's interests started to diverge. They stepped down as co-directors, bravely as feminist leadership of the period encouraged, handing the reigns of WMM over to the filmmakers they had trained and engaged. Dougherty continued on the Board through 1979.

=== Other projects ===
Dougherty became an associate of the Women's Institute for Freedom of the Press (WIFP) in 1977. Between 1977 and 1979 she served as Executive Director of the Greene County Arts Council. In 1979 she became development director at Women's Studio Workshop in Rosendale, NY. At WSW she curated the series Women's Work in Film and Video and lead the fundraising around WSW's move to its own home, the Binnewater Arts Center on the outskirts of the village in an old cement storefront. In 1987 Dougherty moved to Eastern Long Island where she became development director at Local TV, the public-access television channel of East Hampton, New York. She consulted in this capacity until 1993. During these years Dougherty served a 2nd stretch on Women Make Movies Board of Directors from 1987-1995.

As well she free-lanced with Heresies on grant writing and for Media Network she wrote a 40-page handbook on environmental media. After converting with her partner an old fuel depot into a living working space, with the rise of the internet Dougherty was able to do more long distance work from her home in New Mexico. Through an initiative started in 2006, Media Equity Collaborative, Dougherty worked with scores of women-run media groups and organizations to encourage a broad swath of funders to increased support to feminist-led media. Based on a survey and other findings she wrote several reports and conducted workshops at conferences like the Allied Media Conference and Women's Funding Network. With Shireen Mitchell in 2010 she reactivated the Media and Technology Task Force of the National Council of Women's Organizations. Together they serve as co-chairs.

Over the net, she has been an active mentor and cheerleader of six women's films on some aspect of history of the women's movement. The last, Left on Pearl was completed by end of 2014. On Lynn Hershman's Women Art Revolution (2010) she served as a producer and raised a single, individual contribution of $100,000 for its post-production. For Feminist: Stories from Women's Liberation she mentored filmmaker Jennifer Lee through the post-production stage of her 1-hour documentary. Through crowdfunding platforms Dougherty has been able to support scores of feminist independent productions and to rally others to fund these works: among them are Obvious Child, Equal Means Equal, and Mosquita y Mari.

Dougherty is presently centering her efforts on girl/women/lesbian film teaching organizations and their necessity in changing the real picture of women in social, political and economic environments.

== Filmography ==
=== Camera and co-producer ===
Director & Co-Editor, one segment, Mother America, (1970, 30m, 16mm) A Women Make Movies production.

=== Camera, director, editor and executive producer ===
- The Women's Happy Time Commune (1971, 50m, color, 16mm) directed by Sheila Paige, a Women Make Movies Production – currently not in distribution
- Sweet Bananas (1972, 32m, 16mm) A Women Make Movies production
- The Trials of Alice Crimmins, (1972, 12m, B7W, 16mm) collaboratively made by a group of women filmmakers emerging in the NY film scene of the early 1970s. (archived at the Academy of Motion Pictures, Los Angeles)
- Songs, Skits, Poetry & Prison Life (26 mins, B&W, EIAJ, 1974) segments by women at the Bedford Hills Correctional Facility (New York). Showcased at 1975 Women's Video Festival, NYC

=== Producer ===
- Healthcaring (1976, 16mm, 32 min) by Bostrom and Warrenbrand, A Women Make Movies, Inc. Production.
- Women Art Revolution (2010, 83 mins, DVD) directed by Lynn Hershman Leeson
- Youth - Three in the Park directed by Bernadette Beekman
- The Last Picture Show directed by Valerie Petrak – both in collection of NYPL
- From WMM – Fear Jean Shaw
- Domestic Tranquility Harriet Kreigel (MOMA)
- For Better or Worse Judith Shaw Acuna
- Paranoia Blues Jane Warrenbrand
- Just Looking Suzanne Armstrong
- Katie Kelly Brown, McConnell, etc.
- Women Centering Nancy Peck
- Four Women Mary Harrison
- La Muchacha Solitaria Angela xxxxxx (films archived at the Academy of Motion Pictures, Los Angeles)

=== Producer, director, editor ===
From the Interior, Colonized (1992, VHS/DVD, 26mins) featuring Vandana Shiva at a global women's environment conference held in Miami in advance of the 1992 Earth Summit, follows a superb discussion by global women creating the platform on biodiversity that Wangari Mathai reads in the closing session. Right-on comment by Peggy Antrobus at the wrap-up press conference. (available through Dougherty & Schlesinger Library)

=== Interchanging roles ===
International Videoletters (1975-1977, 30 mins, EAIJ) – estimated 50 separate tapes produced over the two years—a bi-monthly exchange among women's groups from 17 communities in the US and internationally. At present four known tapes have survived.

=== Assistant camera ===
They Are Their Own Gifts (1978, 52 mins, 16mm, color) by Murphy and Rhodes.

=== Camera, editor, co-director and co-producer ===
- Surviva (1980, 32 mins, 16mm, color) with Carol Clement (archived at the Academy of Motion Pictures, Los Angeles) Camera, Director, Editor, Producer
- Dear Sarah: A Report Twenty Years Later (1989, VHS, color, 26m) – a light-hearted look back at the 1969 sit-ins using original Super-8 footage and mimeographed documents of the period. (in Sarah Lawrence College & Schlesinger Library archives)

=== Anchor ===
cable booth video-jockey, producer, Cultural Democracy/Ecology (1987 – 1993, 1 hr TV show) approximately 40 hours of feminist culture, local events, interviews, and happenings from Eastern Long Island. (Available at Local TV and Schlesinger Library (soon).
