= They Are Their Own Gifts =

1978 American documentary film

They Are Their Own Gifts is a 1978 American documentary film. The film depicts three women artists: Alice Neel, Muriel Rukeyser, and Anna Sokolow.

The film was made by Margaret Murphy and Lucille Rhodes.
