= Women in documentary film =

Women in documentary film describes the role of women as directors, writers, performers, producers, and other film industry professions. According to a 2017 study by San Diego University's Center for the Study of Women in Television and Film, women make up around thirty percent of the population of people working in the documentary film industry, worldwide. In a separate study on the employment of women in indie films, the Center found that overall fewer woman directed independent films were screened at film festivals but that a higher percentage of woman directed documentary films were screened, at 8 films versus 13 documentary films directed by men. In an October 2015 Annenberg study, women documentarians in countries other than the U.S. were 40 percent likely to be “helmers” (in the top position) as opposed to 30 percent likely in the U.S. The study counted films with multiple countries involved “as other countries” but if the U.S. was involved it wasn't counted as “other countries.”

The world of documentary film and the Oscars were criticized in 2016 by entertainment attorney Victoria Cook, who commented that there is a “misperception that the (feature) documentary category is more inclusive, less sexist and less racist than the other categories" and noted that only two female documentary filmmakers have won Oscars in the documentary feature category in the last twenty years.

== History ==
Prior to the twentieth century women did work in documentary film and the major documentary movements, but their roles were typically limited to less visible ones such as research. German film director Leni Riefenstahl has been credited as pioneering the modern form of documentary film with her 1935 Nazi propaganda film Triumph of the Will. Other women, such as Ruby Grierson and Frances H. Flaherty, have also been named as pioneers of the genre whose work and influence has been overshadowed by their male counterparts and relatives. The more modern documentary filmmakers Safi Faye and Trinh T. Minh-ha have also been cited as influences in the University of Illinois Press book Women and Experimental Filmmaking, as they "contribute to a tradition of experimental documentary filmmaking that avoids the objectifying, colonialist tendencies of much documentary and ethnography."

=== China ===
In China, the field of documentary filmmaking has been named as an emerging field that "[provides] essential resources for women directors". The creation of courses of study, documentary film festivals and television channels in Taiwan have helped encourage filmmakers and "contributed to a new tide of Taiwan documentary filmmaking", which in turn "helped produce generations of women filmmakers concerned with representing feminist issues and the local cultures, customs, and history of Taiwan."

== List of female documentarians ==
- Agnès Varda
- Trịnh T. Minh-ha
- Andrea Arnold
- Chantal Akerman
- Su Friedrich
- Julia Bachar
- Ruth Beckermann
- Marcie Begleiter
- Zero Chou
- Barbara Cranmer
- Osa Johnson
- Barbara Kopple
- Jodie Mack
- Kay Mander
- Tamara Milosevic
- Megan Mylan
- Laura Poitras
- Leni Riefenstahl
- Gulbara Tolomushova
- Mila Turajlić
- Mye Hoang
- Jacqueline Veuve
- Ruby Yang
- Marina Zenovich
- Lydia Zimmermann
- Maliha Zulfacar
- Clio Barnard
- Mania Akbari
- Rachel Lears
- Rachel Dretzin
- Ava DuVernay
- Nanfu Wang
- Elizabeth Chai Vasarhelyi
- Julia Reichert
- Petra Costa
- Eunice Gutman
- Eliane Caffé
- Helena Solberg
- Lucia Murat
- Maria Augusta Ramos
- Norma Bahia Pontes
- Sandra Kogut
- Sueli Maxakali
- Susanna Lira
- Eliza Capai
- Clara Zappettini
- Carmen Guarini
- Bonni Cohen
- Gabriela Cowperthwaite
- Liz Garbus
- Jennie Livingston
- Amy Berg
- Barbara Kopple
- Stephanie Soechtig
- Samantha Futerman
- Jennifer Siebel Newsom
- Kimberlee Acquaro
- Lotje Sodderland
- Dawn Porter
- Sara Gómez
- Amy Ziering
- Ai Xiaoming
- Nanfu Wang
- Adanech Admassu
- Tamara Kotveska
