= Debra Zimmerman =

American film distributor and lecturer

- Born: New York City, New York, U.S.
- Website: https://www.wmm.com/

Debra Zimmerman is an American film distributor and lecturer. She has been the Executive Director non-profit media arts organization Women Make Movies since 1983.

== Life and career ==
Zimmerman was born in New York City. In the late 1970s she worked as an intern at Women Make Movies and was then hired by the organization as the Associate Producer and Editor of Why Women Stay, which was directed by Jacqueline Shortell-McSweeney.

In 1983 she became the Executive Director of Women Make Movies. She has moderated panels and given master classes at the Sundance Film Festival, the Toronto International Film Festival, and Reel Screen. She lectures regularly on women filmmakers and independent film at various universities, including the New School for Social Research, the University of Texas at Austin, UCLA, Harvard University and Smith College. She has keynoted conferences on women’s cinema at SUNY Stony Brook and the University of Sunderland, England.

Zimmerman served on the juries of various film festivals, including the Abu Dhabi Film Festival, the International Documentary Film Festival Amsterdam, the Cartagena Film Festival and the One World Film Festival. she held the Laurie Chair in Women's Studies at Douglass College and Rutgers University in 2014-15. She was the author of a Chapter, Film as Activism and transformative praxis: Women Make Movies in the book, The Routledge Companion to Cinema & Gender. She is also a member of the Board of Directors of Cinema Tropical.

== Awards and honors ==
- 2018 — Honorary Maverick Award, Female Eye Film Festival
- 2013 — Doc Mogul Award at the Hot Docs Canadian International Documentary Festival
- 2012 — Loreen Arbus Award, New York Women in Film & Television
- 2011 — The Laura Ziskin Lifetime Achievement Award, Athena Film Festival
- 2009 — Elizabeth Cady Stanton Award, High Falls Film Festival
