= Women Make Movies =

American non-profit feminist media arts organization

- Abbreviation: WMM
- Formation: September 1969
- Type: Non-profit organization
- Location: New York City
- Founders: Ariel Dougherty; Sheila Page
- Executive Director: Debra Zimmerman
- Website: wmm.com

Women Make Movies is a non-profit feminist media arts organization based in New York City. Founded by Ariel Dougherty and Sheila Paige with Dolores Bargowski, WMM was first a feminist production collective that emerged from city-wide Women's Liberation meetings in September 1969. They produced four films by 1973. Dougherty and Paige incorporated the organization in March 1972 as a community based workshop to teach film to everyday women. A distribution service was also begun as an earned income program. In the mid-1970s a membership was created that screened and distributed members' work. In the early 1980s focus shifted to concentrate on distribution of independent films by and about women. WMM also provides production assistance to women filmmakers.

== Film catalog ==
The organization distributes more than 500 films created by over 400 women filmmakers from nearly 30 countries. These films address such subjects as reproductive rights, AIDS, body image, economic development, racism, immigration, medical ethics, and global feminism. The collection includes films by key feminist filmmakers including Trinh T. Minh-ha, Julie Dash, Pratibha Parmar, Jane Campion, and Kim Longinotto.

== Recognition and distribution ==
Films distributed by WMM have appeared at film festivals worldwide, including the Sundance Film Festival, Cannes Film Festival, the International Documentary Film Festival Amsterdam (IDFA)., and the Athena Film Festival Its films have received media awards such as the Special Jury Prize at Sundance (The Greatest Silence: Rape in the Congo and Rough Aunties), the Academy Award (Love & Diane), the Emmy (Quick Brown Fox: An Alzheimer's Story), and the Peabody (Sisters in Law). In 2011, WMM received an award from the Athena Film Festival for their outstanding work distributing films by and about women.

WMM films have aired on cable networks and public television stations around the world, including HBO/Cinemax, PBS, Sundance Channel, and Rede Globo. Among the broadcast titles: Kim Longinotto's Hold Me Tight, Let Me Go and Gemma Cubero and Celeste Carrasco's Ella Es El Matador. The organization has worked closely with the Public Broadcasting System, Hunter College, the Museum of Modern Art, and many other NYC-based media arts organizations.

== Executive director ==
In 1983, Debra Zimmerman became the executive director of WMM.

== Archive ==
The Academy Film Archive houses the Women Make Movies Collection, which includes prints, videotape masters, and original film elements of dozens of features, documentaries, shorts, and informational films made by and about women.
