= Matador (disambiguation) =

A matador is the central bullfighter who must kill the bull.

Matador(s), The Matador(s), El Matador, or Los Matadores may also refer to:

== Arts and entertainment ==
=== Comics ===
- Matador (Marvel Comics), a super-villain in the Marvel Comics universe

=== Film, television, and theater ===
- Matador (film) a 1986 film directed by Pedro Almodóvar
- The Matador, a 2005 film starring Pierce Brosnan
- The Matador (2008 film), a documentary
- Matador (American TV series), a 2014 action series
- Matador (Danish TV series), a 1978–1982 drama series
- Matador (Danish musical), a 2007 musical based on the television series
- Matador (English musical), a 1991 musical based on the story of El Cordobés
- The Matadors, film from Eric Roberts filmography

=== Games and toys ===
- Matador (cards), a top trump in some card games
- Matador (domino game)
- Matador (toy), a wooden construction set
- Matador (video game) or Brigador, a 2016 tactical game
- El Matador (video game), a 2006 third-person shooter

=== Literature ===
- Matador, a 1934 novel by Marguerite Steen
- Matador series, a series of science fiction novels by Steve Perry

=== Music ===
==== Bands ====
- The Matadors (band), a 1960s Czech beat band

==== Albums ====
- Matador (Kenny Dorham album) or the title song, 1963
- Matador (Gaz Coombes album) or the title song, 2015
- Matador (Grant Green album) or the title song, 1979
- Matador: The Songs of Leonard Cohen, by Patricia O'Callaghan, 2012
- Matador, by Arms and Sleepers, 2009
- Matador, by Mickey 3D, or the title song, 2005
- Matador, by Zoroaster, 2010

==== Songs ====
- "Matador" (Akinori Nakagawa song), 2004
- "Matador" (Los Fabulosos Cadillacs song), 1994
- "Matador"/"Da Frame 2R", a single by Arctic Monkeys, 2007
- "The Matador" (Johnny Cash song), 1963
- "The Matador" (Sylvia song), 1981
- "Matador", by Acumen Nation from Transmissions from Eville, 1994
- "Matador", by Garland Jeffreys from American Boy & Girl, 1979
- "Matador", by Halford from Halford IV: Made of Metal, 2010
- "Matador", by Xmal Deutschland, 1986
- “Matador”, by Luvcat, 2024

== Businesses and companies ==
- Matador (company), a Slovakia-based global tire producer
- Matador Content, an American television production company
- Matador Cooperative Farm, a defunct agricultural cooperative near Kyle, Saskatchewan, Canada
- Matador Records, an American record label
- The Matador (bar), a defunct bar in Portland, Oregon, US
- The Matador Club, a defunct country music venue in Toronto, Canada
- The Matador (restaurant), an American chain of Mexican restaurants

== Military ==
- Matador (mine protected vehicle), an armoured mine protected vehicle produced by Paramount Group in South Africa
- MATADOR, an anti-armour missile system developed by Singapore and Israel
- AEC Matador, a military vehicle used by the Allies during World War II
- AV-8S Matador, Spanish version of the AV-8A Harrier
- MGM-1 Matador, one of the first cruise missiles ever introduced
- Operation Matador (disambiguation), the name of several military or intelligence plans

== People with the stage name or nickname ==
- Matador (rapper), Senegalese hip hop musician
- Edinson Cavani (born 1987), Uruguayan football player
- Lloyd Daley (1939–2018), Jamaican reggae producer
- Luis Hernández (footballer, born 1968), Mexican football player
- Marcelo Salas (born 1974), Chilean football player
- Tito Santana (born 1953), American professional wrestler
- Luis Tejada (born 1982), Panamanian football player
- Primo & Epico or "Los Matadores", a professional wrestling tag team
- Ilia Topuria or "El Matador" (born 1997), Spanish mixed martial artist

== Places ==
- Matador, Texas, US
- Matador Mountain, Antarctica

== Sports ==
- Cal State Northridge Matadors, the sports teams of California State University, Northridge
- FK Matador Púchov, a Slovak football club, sponsored by the tyre producer

== Transportation ==
- AMC Matador, an automobile manufactured by American Motors Corporation from 1971 to 1978
- Dodge Matador, an automobile model marketed during 1960
- El Matador (custom car), a show car built by Bill Cushenbery 1959–1961
- Tempo Matador, a series of light commercial vehicles originally designed by Tempo and subsequently built by several motor companies between 1949 and 2000.

== Other uses ==
- Matador (cocktail), a tequila-based cocktail
- Avid Matador, a 1990s 2D painting software on Silicon Graphics computers
