= Cecilia Domeyko =

Chilean-American filmmaker

- Born: Cecilia Del Rosario Domeyko Lea-Plaza
- Education: Pontifical Catholic University of Chile, American University
- Occupations: Director; producer; writer; editor; journalist; philanthropist
- Known for: Filmmaking, media production
- Notable work: Cuba Mia: Portrait of an All-Woman Orchestra; Code Name: Butterflies
- Awards: Women in Film & Video's Women of Vision Awards; National Association of Telecommunications Officers and Advisors Award; Gabriel Award; Anna Maria Arias Award

Cecilia Domeyko is a Chilean-American author, journalist, filmmaker, former broadcaster, and philanthropist based in Washington, D.C. She is the president and founder of Accent Media as well as the founder and director of the Mariposa Cultural Foundation. Her filmmaking career has become noted for winning awards and working with high-profile organizations including Univision, AARP, the Catholic Church, and the World Bank. Domeyko's career has been largely focused on raising cultural awareness and educating the international community through her films and authorship.

== Early life and background ==
Cecilia Del Rosario Domeyko Lea-Plaza was born in Santiago, Chile to Juan Domeyko, a Chilean diplomat, and Paz Lea-Plaza Sáenz, a writer. Cecilia was the fourth of their five children. Her father was a Chilean career diplomat for the Chilean government and was the Minister Counselor at the Chilean Embassy in Ottawa, Canada before retiring as an Ambassador. Through her father's lineage, Cecilia is the great-granddaughter of the geologist and scholar Ignacy Domeyko who after participating in the 1830 Polish Uprising against Czarist Russia, was exiled in Paris, where he was subsequently hired by the government of Chile to teach mining to Chilean students. After establishing the family's new base in Chile, he was one of the founders of the University of Chile and its Rector for 15 years.

Due to her father's career, Domeyko's upbringing would include frequent stretches of living abroad in Chilean embassies in Australia, the Dominican Republic, the United States, and Canada. As such, Domeyko was raised bilingual, speaking Spanish and English. She would also assist in ceremonial procedures and official events hosted in the embassy, such as in receptions for Chile's National Day. Her father represented Chile in a pinning ceremony bestowing a congratulatory boutonnière on the Chargé d'Affaires for Uruguay's Embassy in Ottawa to mark the anniversary of Uruguay's independence.

She began her journalism career as a teenager when she wrote a regular column on the customs of Latin American teenagers in the Ottawa Journal's Youth Page. Domeyko then went on to formally study and receive a BA in communications from the Catholic University of Chile as well as a master's degree in Writing and Directing for Film from The American University in Washington, DC., graduating Summa Cum Laude.

== Film career ==
Domeyko is best known for her filmmaking career as a bilingual producer, director, and scriptwriter in English and Spanish. Domeyko has produced film work, such as educational documentaries and short films, for Univision, the Catholic Church, the World Bank, AARP, the American Bar Association, USAID, USIA, and NIH. Her productions have been aired in over 96 countries. In 1988 she founded Accent Media Productions Inc., with her husband Dr. Jack Jorgens and served as president until 2012.

An early notable production was a 1987 television series produced for Univision on Hispanic involvement in the US military. The series, which aired on Memorial Day, prominently focused on "Hero Street" in Silvis, Illinois, which became known for its residents' involvement in several wars including WWII, the Korean War, and the Vietnam War.

Domeyko has participated in multiple international film festivals. In 1998, Domeyko's film Magic Wool premiered at the Kennedy Center in Washington, D.C. as part of Chile's National Day celebration. It was later shown at The Alliance's Cinema of the Americas Festival during its women's focus day. The film, which Domeyko directed, produced, and wrote about a group of peasant women in Chile who embroider tapestries about their lives and dreams, had also aired on the Discovery Channel For Latin America. Her 1999 film El Regalo De Cumpleaños (The Birthday Present) had shown at multiple film festivals and won several film festival awards including Crystal Film Festival Prize of Excellence for 2000 and the Houston International Film Festival 2001 Bronze Prize.

In 2002 Domeyko and Accent Media were hired to produce a series of educational short films for the Catholic Church as part of a campaign called La Familia Unida: Esperanza en la Vida to investigate problems facing Hispanic families and communities and provide them with a message of love and hope. The films covered several themes including poverty, discrimination, gangs, drug abuse, and domestic violence. The films aired for a decade on Univision in the US, and on CNN-en-Español in 18 Latin American countries.

In 2003 Domeyko produced the documentary Nombre Secreto: Mariposas (Code Name: Butterflies). The film focuses on the life of three Dominican-born Mirabal sisters who in the 1950s were significant resistance figures against the Trujillo dictatorship. In an interview with Juventud Rebelde, Domeyko states that her inspiration for the film came from reading the book En el Tiempo de las Mariposas by Julia Alvarez. The documentary film features interviews with 40 survivors of the Rafael Trujillo regime in the Dominican Republic. Key scenes of the documentary were filmed with actors in Cuba, which is noteworthy as this took place at a time when it was difficult for filmmakers and media members to get access to the island under the Castro regime. The documentary also had a later premiere at the Hall of the Americas at the Organization of American States in Washington, DC and was exhibited throughout the Dominican Republic after a Dominican Premiere hosted by the House of Representatives of the Dominican Republic.

Another notable film from 2003 was Film Cuba Mía: Portrait of an All-Woman Orchestra, which was broadcast in the United States through PBS, and internationally in ABC Australia, as well as France, Australia, Finland, Hungary, and Iceland. It documented an all-woman Cuban orchestra and their conductor Zenaida Romeu and would win over 20 international film awards including CINE Golden Eagle (US), the Gabriel Award, and Silver in the Hamburg Film Festival of Germany. The film premiered at the Embassy of Canada in Washington, D.C. and was also included in the VII Festival de Cine Latino to more than 30,000 spectators where it was one of 42 finalists chosen from over 200 intentional entries.

== Writing career ==
Domeyko's first career was in writing and written journalism. Her early journalism career included a column with a regular column on the customs of Latin American teenagers in the Ottawa Journal. She would go on to be the Washington Correspondent for several international media outlets including Chile's Revista Hoy Magazine and Latin American magazine Itsmo, where she covered the election of Jose Miguel Insulza as Secretary General of the Organization of American States. Domeyko was also Washington Correspondent for Diario La Segunda of Chile where she covered US politics.

Alongside her journalistic writing, Domeyko received early recognition as a published author for her book Lily, written in conjunction with Venezuelan film director, Abraham Pulido, which won the City of Caracas ANAC 1982 Script Award and was later adopted into a film by Pulido, winning the 1984 Venezuelan Best Picture award.

In 2017 Domeyko released the novel Sacrificio en la Frontera, a love story taking place on both sides of the US-Mexican border and that deals with the issue child trafficking. The novel is published in both English and Spanish through Akeru Publicaciones. Her ensuing book tour launched with a promotional visit to Altamira Libros bookstore in Coral Gables on October 26, 2018, where the book was formally debuted. As part of her promotional tour for the novel, Domeyko was interviewed by Wall Street International's Patricia Mayorga, which was published on September 26 of 2019.

On November 14, 2019, the Chilean Embassy in Washington D.C. held a promotional event for Sacrificio en la Frontera that included a talk, interview, and question and answer session with Domeyko, as well as selected readings with passages interpreted by actors Dayan Aldana, Melissa Strova-Valencia, Yecid Benavides, and Ricardo Sanchez. Present at the event were dignitaries including Chilean ambassador Alfonso Silva Navarro and U.S. Congressman Franklin Garcia, as well as Dominican filmmaker Nelson Peralta among other invitees. The event was sponsored by the Gabriela Mistral Foundation, DC Latino Leadership Council, Revista Vínculos, Mariposa Cultural Foundation, Cactus Cantina, Café Medrano, Raysa White's Akerú Publicaciones. The Washington D.C. book launch was covered by El Tiempo Latino and El Pregonero.

On July 15, 2021, Domeyko participated in a virtual panel discussion in support of her book hosted by the North American Chilean Chamber of Commerce, the Gabriela Mistral Foundation, and the Mariposa Cultural Foundation.

The English edition of the novel, Sacrifice on the Border, is slated for release in 2022.

== Broadcast journalism ==
Domeyko's broadcast journalism career was centered in covering Washington D.C. news, including the White House, Capitol Hill, and the US Department of State. Domeyko began her on-camera reporting with Univision as reporter and producer of their Washington Bureau's national evening newscast and also produced film and television specials. Her other on-camera roles included breaking coverage and production credits for America Today, an international program broadcast to 44 countries, and the United States Information Agency where she hosted specials on major events such as the Women's Conference in Beijing.

Domeyko was also a bilingual live anchor for Eternal World Television Network covering Pope John Paul II 1998 visit to Cuba, coverage of which garnered a worldwide audience of 350 million viewers. She was also an on-camera reporter and producer for Chile's Channel 13 news where she covered major international breaking stories including US elections, the Gulf War, and the September 11 attacks from Washington D.C.

In 2008 Domeyko wrote, directed, and produced the half hour Spanish-language magazine show "Celebremos Lo Latino," for Channel 25 of Baltimore, which would win National Association of Telecommunications Officers and Advisors Award (NATOA) for concept design, directing, writing, and producing.

Domeyko currently serves as director of USA-Canada chapter of the World Association of Women Journalists and Writers.

== Nonprofit career ==
Domeyko founded the Mariposa Cultural Foundation, a nonprofit headquartered in Washington D.C., in 2002. Its founding mission is dedicated to the promotion of human rights, the rights of women and children, indigenous people, the environment, arts, and culture.

As per Domeyko's background, the Foundation primarily involves itself in non-commercial cultural and educational projects in film, television, books, cultural and artistic events, tours, internet and other media. Notable examples include the production and release of the films Cuba Mia: Portrait of an All-Woman Orchestra, Code Name: Butterflies, and Havana City of Soul: Walking the Streets of History. The Foundation has established affiliates in Mexico City as well as Santiago, Chile.

== Awards and recognition ==
Throughout her film and journalism career, Domeyko has won over sixty awards for writing, directing, and producing. Her career recognition awards include the Women in Film and Television's Women of Vision Award (2011) and the Anna Maria Arias Fund Award (2007), for which Domeyko was featured on the cover of Latina Style Magazine (Vol. 13, No. 5, 2007).

Early in her writing career, Domeyko's 1982 screenplay Lily won the City of Caracas Script Award for that year.

Domeyko's Public Service Announcement Ojo Con Su Visión, filmed for the NIH's National Eye Institute and hosted by Cuban singer Celia Cruz and her husband Pedro Knight, won the 1995 The Charleston International Film Festival Bronze Award. The following year, her film Magic Wool won the 1996 International Cinema Industry Competition (CINDY awards) Bronze Award, the 1996 National Educational Media Network Silver Apple, and the 1996 Rochester Movies on a Shoestring Festival Silver Award.

Education in Uganda, her documentary filmed for the World Bank and United States Agency for Development, won the 1998 and 1999 Crystal Award of Excellence for Communication and Videography (respectively), Third Place prize at the 1999 International Film and Video Festival, the Bronze 1999 Telly Award, and the 1999 Silver International Cinema In Industry Competition (CINDY awards). Chilean Education won the 1999 Silver Telly Award, Third Place Prize at the 1999 International Film and Video Festival, the 1999 Crystal Award of Excellence for Videography, the 1998 Crystal Award of Distinction for Communication, the 2000 GOLD Mercury Award, the 2000 Crystal Award of Distinction, the 2000 CINE Golden Eagle Award, and the 2000 Bronze World Medal New York Festival Award. Another 1999 film, El Regalo De Cumpleaños, won the Golden Eagle Film Festival Golden Prize (2000), Crystal Film Festival Prize of Excellence (2000), and Houston International Film Festival Bronze Prize (2001).

Domeyko's Public Service Announcement The Birthday Present won the 2001 Bronze Remi at the WorldFest Houston Festival, the 2001 Summit Award, 2000 Crystal Award of Excellence Communicator's 2000 Gold award, and CINE Golden Eagle Award.

Her 2003 film Cuba Mía: Portrait of an All-Woman Orchestra, would win over 20 international film awards including CINE Golden Eagle (US), the Gabriel Award, and Silver in the Hamburg Film Festival of Germany, the 2004 New York International Independent Film and Video Festival award for Best Cinematography, the 2003 Gold Telly Award, the 2003 Chicago Film Festival Silver Award, the 2003 Silver Screen Award at the U.S. International Film and Video Festival, and the 2007 National Award at the In-Edit Musical Film Festival in Santiago, Chile.

Domeyko won the 2008 National Association of Telecommunications Officers and Advisors Award (NATOA) for concept design, directing, writing, and producing of "Celebremos Lo Latino," a Spanish magazine show for Channel 25 of Baltimore.

Domeyko's Code Name: Butterflies won the 2009 Cine Latino Award at the Washington, DC Independent Film Festival as well as the 2009 Silver Telly Awards for Directing and Cinematography and Bronze for Historical Theme. In 2020 the film was also included among La Silla Rota's top 15 feminist films list.
