= Antosca =

Antosca is a surname. Notable people with the surname include:

- Nick Antosca (born 1983), American writer, producer, and novelist
- Stephanie Antosca, American television producer

== See also ==
- Antosia
