= Exodus (custom car) =

Overview
- Manufacturer: Bill Cushenbery
- Production: 1961

Body and chassis
- Body style: 1959 Chevrolet Impala

Exodus is a customized 1959 Chevrolet Impala built by Bill Cushenbery in 1961.

Built for Tony Cardoza, Exodus debuted at the 1961 Monterey Kar Kapades. It had twin vertical headlights. It also had chromed Dagmar bumpers.

Every body panel was altered in some way, setting a new trend in customizing.

Exodus and El Matador, which appeared the same year, drew a lot of attention to Cushenbery and a lot of custom work for his shop.

== Sources ==
- Mauldin, Calvin. "Bill Cushenbery: Custom Creations for the Future", in Rod & [sic] Custom, December 1998, p. 83-85.
