= New York Women in Film & Television =

New York Women in Film & Television (NYWIFT) is a non-profit membership organization for women in film, television, and digital media. The organization is an educational forum for media professionals and a network for the exchange of information and resources.

== History ==
NYWIFT was founded in 1977 by New York producer/director Lenore DeKoven and Hollywood Reporter bureau chief Morna Murphy Martell. The first meeting consisted of 25 women. In 1978, New York Women in Film, Inc. received a certificate of incorporation from New York State, and they published their first roster of 52 members.

Today, NYWIFT has a membership of more than 10,000 people.^{(5)} Members work in different areas of the entertainment industry. It is a component of the Women in Film network, which consists of 40 international chapters and has more than 10,000 members.

== Presidents ==
- Marilyn Casselman (1977–1980)
- Gail Frank (1980–1981)
- Jeanne Betancourt (1981–1982)
- Victoria Hamburg (1982–1983)
- Celeste Gainey (1983–1985)
- Mary Feldbauer Jansen (1985–1986)
- Nancy Leff (1986–1987)
- Pat Fili (1987–1988)
- Pat Herold (1988–1989)
- Mirra Bank Brockman (1989–1990)
- Marjorie Kalins (1990–1991)
- Grace Blake (1991–1992)
- Beth Dembitzer (1992–1994)
- Harlene Freezer (1994–1996)
- Joy Pereths (1996–1998)
- Ellen Geiger (1998–2000)
- Marcie Setlow (2000–2003)
- Linda Kahn (2003–2005)
- Carey Graeber (2005–2007)
- Laverne Berry (2007–2010)
- Alexandra Levi (2010–2012)
- Alexis Alexanian (2012–2017)
- Simone Pero (2017–2019)
- Jamie Zelermyer (2019–2022)
- Leslie Fields-Cruz (2022-2024)
- Kim Jackson (2024-present)

== Programs ==
NYWIFT produces over 50 programs and special events annually, which are meant to recognize and encourage the contributions of women in the field of entertainment.

The annual New York Women in Film & Television Muse Awards is a luncheon to honor prominent film and television personalities. Designing Women, an annual gala co-presented by Variety, was created by NYWIFT to acknowledge and celebrate the influence and impact of costume designers, makeup artists, and hair stylists on film and television.

In 2016, NYWIFT partnered with The Art of Brooklyn Film Festival to produce a panel titled “Women in Entertainment: Power Players Changing the Parity Game” that discussed women's representation in front of and behind the camera.

New York Women in Film & Television is involved in several special funds that support future and current filmmakers and preserve the past work of women filmmakers. They include: The Archive Project, Loreen Arbus Scholarship, Women in Film Finishing Fund, Scholarship Fund, and Women's Film Preservation Fund.

In 2015, it was announced that Meryl Streep had funded a screenwriters' lab for female screenwriters over forty years old called "The Writers Lab", which was to be run by "New York Women in Film & Television" and the collective IRIS. As of the announcement, "The Writers Lab" is the only initiative in the world for female screenwriters over forty years old.

== See also ==
- Women in Film and Television International
- Women in Film Crystal + Lucy Awards
- Women in Film and Television (South Africa)
