= Women in Film & Video-DC Women of Vision Awards =

Filmographic awards for actresses

External videos
- Women of Vision Awards 2012: Christine Weber Tribute, December 9, 2012

Women in Film & Video Women of Vision Award is an annual award by the Women in Film and Television International District of Columbia.

== Recipients ==
- 2020 Melissa Houghton
- 2017 Julie Dash
- 2016 Christine Vachon
- 2015 Joan Darling, Dawn Porter
- 2013 Penny Marshall
- 2012 Shirin Ghareeb, Agnieszka Holland, Margaret Parsons, Christine Weber
- 2011 Maryanne Culpepper, Cecilia Domeyko, Mickey Green, Laura Possessky
- 2010 Patricia Aufderheide, Grace Guggenheim, Connie Day-McClinton
- 2009 Constance Chatfield-Taylor, Sharon Sloane, Sheila Smith
- 2008 Patty Duke, Heidi Ewing and Rachel Grady, Susan Lacy, Linda Maslow
- 2007 Susie Coelho, Patricia Finneran, Barbara Kopple, Deborah Redmond, Andrea Sims,
- 2006 Diana Ingraham, Beth Mendelson, Laureen Ong, Nina Gilden Seavey, Daphne Maxwell Reid
- 2005 Stephanie Antosca, Jennifer Cortner, Carrie Fisher, Carol Flaisher, Brooke Bailey Johnson,
- 2004 Lynda Carter, Phylis Geller, Jennifer Lawson, Penny Lee, Louise Slaughter
- 2003 Ruby Dee, Amy DeLouise, Ricki Green, Sharon Percy Rockefeller, Carole Simpson
- 2002 Debra L. Lee, Rosemary Reed, Catherine Wyler
- 2001 Jean Picker-Firstenberg, Aviva Kempner, Sharon Stone, Aida Takla-O'Reilly
- 2000 Tipper Gore, Gwen Ifill, Wendie Malick, Judith McHale, Roseanne, Bonnie Nelson Schwartz
- 1999 Sheila Brooks, Tyne Daly, J.C. Hayward, Tippi Hedren, Linda Ross
- 1998 Sandy Cannon-Brown, Linda Ellerbee, Robin Smith, Susan Smith, Mary Steenburgen
- 1997 Ruth Pollak, Renee Poussaint, Cicely Tyson, Marilyn Weiner, Nancy Woodhull
- 1996 Maureen Bunyan, Michal Carr, Lee Grant, Sherry Jones
- 1995 Kathy Bates, Elizabeth Campbell, Judith Dwan Hallet, Ruth Roland, Lesley Stahl
- 1994 Ginny Durrin, Elise Reeder, Nina Rosenblum

== See also ==
- List of American television awards
- List of media awards honoring women
