= Lynette Spano =

- Born: Brooklyn, New York City, U.S.

Lynette Spano is the American founder, president and chief executive officer of SCI World Consulting Services, Inc., an American information technology services corporation, according to the Washington Business Journal. SCI World manages critical federal infrastructure projects and operates two of the most powerful supercomputers in the world, according to Inc. magazine.

== Early life and education ==
Spano was born Lynette Rodriguez Vives, typical of Spanish culture using both fathers and mothers name. She grew up in a large family, the oldest of seven siblings in Brooklyn with her Puerto Rican mother and her Cuban father, according to WJLA-TV. She never went to college, instead working her way up from receptionist to sales, before founding SCI World in her mother's basement in 1983, according to the Washington Business Journal.

On September 5, 2019, while sitting in a fencing academy with her grandson she sat next to the wife of one of the fencing coaches - both from Cuba - they learned very quickly that they were relatives- Lynette's father named Alfredo Vives was also her grandfather - it was then, as life has come to full circle Lynette assumes her birth name as Lynette Rodriguez Vives.

In 1975, she changed her name for business purpose to Lynette Spano.

== Career ==
Following high school, Spano began working as a receptionist at Lifeboat Associates, an early microcomputer software publisher company, where she was promoted and became the top salesperson within one year, according to NBC Latino.

In 1983, Spano founded SCI World in her mother's basement and, in the first year, the company boasted $1.7 million in revenue, according to Fairfax County, Virginia's Chamber of Commerce. Now, the company provides information technology services to many federal government agencies, including Department of Homeland Security, the Department of Energy and the Environmental Protection Agency, according to Inc Magazine. and HispanicBusiness.com.

In 2010, Spano founded Stars, Stripes, and Hearts, a non-profit dedicated to supporting military members and their families, according to the Toonari Post. In this capacity, she was recognized by the Anna Maria Arias Foundation as a 2011 Distinguished Honoree.
