= Stephanie Antosca =

Stephanie Antosca is a veteran television producer known for her work on the White House–based drama, The West Wing, and the reality series, I Survived. She was given the Women of Vision Award from Women in Film & Video - DC in 2005.

== Life ==
Antosca graduated from Clark University in Worcester, Massachusetts, in 1989. She moved to Washington, D.C., in 1991 when her mother made her pick and state and get out. Antosca says it was the greatest gift her mother ever gave her.

=== Family ===
She married Barry Boright, a U.S. marshall. They have one daughter, Sydney. They currently live in Delaware.
