= Brooke Bailey Johnson =

American television executive

Brooke Bailey Johnson is an accomplished television executive. She served as the program director for "Live with Regis and Kathie Lee" from when it was a local broadcast and into its national syndication. She is the president of the food category for Scripps Network Interactive. She oversees the Food Network, Cooking Channel, FoodNetwork.com, CookingChannelTV.com, Food2.com, Recipezaar.com, and Enterprises, the business and licensing and merchandising arm of the company.

== Awards ==
1999 - Cable Marketer of the Year by Ad Week

2005 - Women of Vision

2010 - WICT Woman of the Year

2013 - Named one of the most influential women in cable by CableFAX: the Magazine

== Life ==
Johnson earned a bachelor's degree in English literature from Northwestern University in Evanston, a suburb of Chicago north of the city in addition to a master's degree from the university's Medill School of Journalism. She also completed the Kellogg School of Business Advanced Executive Program.
