= Tichi Wilkerson Kassel =

American film personality and publisher

- Tichi Wilkerson Kassel (L) with Sharon Stone (R) (2002)
- Born: Beatrice Ruby Noble; May 10, 1926; Los Angeles, California, U.S.
- Died: March 8, 2004 (aged 77); Los Angeles, California, U.S.
- Occupation: Journalist
- Years active: 1962–1988
- Spouse(s): William Wilkerson (1951–1962); William Miles (1964–1982); Arthur Kassel (1983–2004)

Tichi Wilkerson Kassel (May 10, 1926 – March 8, 2004) was an American film personality and the publisher of The Hollywood Reporter. She established the Women in Film organization, the Key Art and Marketing Concepts awards, and several scholarships for film students.

== Biography ==
Kassel was born Beatrice Ruby Noble in Los Angeles on May 10, 1926. She was raised in Mexico City and returned to Los Angeles as a teenager. Tichi's mother was a maid for William "Billy" Wilkerson, founder, publisher and editor of The Hollywood Reporter newspaper. Wilkerson courted Tichi and they were married on February 23, 1951, in Phoenix, Arizona; He was in his 60s and she was 25. Soon after their marriage, she started to work at the trade paper. When Wilkerson died in 1962, she took over as the paper's second editor and publisher.

After Wilkerson's death, she married realtor William Miles. The couple divorced in 1982, and in 1983 she married Arthur Kassel.

In 1971, Wilkerson Kassel started the Key Art Awards, which annually honor outstanding achievement in motion picture and TV advertising and promotion; and the Marketing Concepts Awards, which offer recognition and cash rewards to motion picture exhibitors who develop and originate innovative and effective marketing campaigns.

In 1973, Tichi founded Women in Film ("WIF") in Los Angeles after learning that only 2% of TV scripts were made by women. The non-profit foundation helps women in the film business by mentoring and opening up opportunities. Today there are more than 40 WIF chapters in 18 countries and the organization has 10,000 members. The organization has expanded to include television as well, for example The Central Florida Chapter of Women in Film and Television, established in 1989.

Wilkerson Kassel started the Wilkerson Foundation, which provides scholarships to film and journalism students at Southern California universities; it merged with the World Film Institute in 1995. She also created scholarships at the Hollywood Women's Press Club and the Los Angeles Police Department, and established a community center and educational program for Olvera Street in Los Angeles.

In the 1980s, Wilkerson Kassel created the "Special Issue", an entire section of The Hollywood Reporter set aside to tribute an individual or entertainment industry phenomenon. Other publications followed her lead, and such issues today are common.

In the mid-1980s, she helped make Beverly Hills and Cannes sister cities, recognizing their entertainment and commercial commonalties. For that accomplishment, she was feted at the 1985 Cannes Film Festival.

In 1988, Tichi published her memoir, Hollywood Legends: The golden years of the Hollywood Reporter. That same year, she was diagnosed with Parkinson's disease and left her post as The Hollywood Reporter's publisher. She sold the paper on April 11, 1988, to trade publishers BPI for $26.7 million.

In 1993 Women's Image Network Awards presented Tichi with its inaugural Lifetime Achievement tribute.

In 2002, Tichi and her husband Arthur Kassel founded the Tichi Wilkerson Kassel Parkinson's Foundation to raise money for research.

== Hollywood Walk of Fame ==
For her achievement in motion pictures, she has a star on the Hollywood Walk of Fame at 7000 Hollywood Boulevard.

== Death ==
On March 8, 2004, aged 77, Tichi Wilkerson Kassel died at Cedars-Sinai Medical Center in Los Angeles after complications from intestinal surgery. Her memorial service at Hillside Memorial Park and Mortuary in West Los Angeles was attended by more than 500 people. According to her wishes, Wilkerson Kassel was cremated and her ashes were scattered into the Pacific Ocean off the coast of California. Six months after her death, her husband was presented the American Spirit Award for Tichi's contribution in assisting men and women pursue a career in the Arts, Music and Education.

== Personal life ==
Following William Wilkerson's death, Beatrice Wilkerson married William Miles, a realtor. The couple divorced in the 1980s. She later married Arthur Kassel, a gun enthusiast and co-founder of the Beverly Hills Gun Club.

== See also ==
- The Hollywood Reporter
- List of stars on the Hollywood Walk of Fame
- William Wilkerson
