= El Matador (custom car) =

Overview
- Manufacturer: Bill Cushenbery
- Production: 1959-1961

Body and chassis
- Class: Custom car

El Matador is a custom car built by Bill Cushenbery during 1959–1961. It was his first show car.

Cushenbery began work on El Matador in late 1959 as a showcase for his talents and a rolling advertisement. It started as a 1939 Ford, chopped 4 1/2 in (110 mm) and sectioned 5 in (130 mm). '57 Olds parking lights were used as taillights. The nerf bar bumpers were adapted from upper bumper rails off a 1950 Pontiac.

He scrounged parts from Seaside Auto Wreckers, operated by Vick Irvan (father of Ernie Irvan). The rear window was a windshield from a 1951 Chevrolet fastback, mounted upside-down.

The car featured vertically-stacked, inward-canted headlights (a common customizing idea at the time), with hand-formed steel front end and chrome mesh grille.

El Matador debuted in February 1961 at the Oakland Roadster Show.

Cushenbery sold the car to Bob Larivee, Sr.

El Matador and Exodus, which appeared the same year, drew a lot of attention to Cushenbery and a lot of custom work for his shop.

== Featured appearances ==
- Twenty Top Customs. Spotlite Book 526
- Rod & Custom, November 1961
- Customs Illustrated, March 1963
- Popular Customs, January 1966
- 1001 Custom Car Ideas, Argus Book 207
- Custom Rodder, Summer 1993
- Custom Rooder, January 1994
- Custom Rodder, July 1994
- Kustoms Illustrated #13

== Sources ==
- Mauldin, Calvin (December 1998). "Bill Cushenbery: Custom Creations for the Future". Rod & Custom. pp. 83–85.
