= Silhouette (show rod) =

Overview
- Manufacturer: Bill Cushenbery
- Production: 1962
- Designer: Don Varner

Body and chassis
- Class: Show car
- Body style: 2-seat Bubble top
- Layout: FR layout
- Platform: 1956 Buick
- Doors: 1 (hinged canopy)

Powertrain
- Engine: Buick Nailhead V8 (early); Ford FE engine (late)

Silhouette was a show car built by Bill Cushenbery in 1962. It debuted at the 1963 Oakland Roadster Show.

== History ==
Silhouette was designed in collaboration with artist Don Varner. Its all-original body made it Cushenbery's first full show car, rather than custom car.

Silhouette debuted at the 1963 Oakland Roadster Show and earned Cushenbery his first Master Builder Award. It won first class in the "Tournament of Frame" at the show, which prize included a trip to Paris, France for Cushenbery and his wife. Later the car toured as part of Ford's Custom Car Caravan.

Silhouette was mistakenly sold to a bodyshop in North Hollywood, then later bought by a friend of Cushenbery's who planned to restore it. The partially disassembled car was on a trailer when the car and trailer together were stolen.

In 2013 it was reported that the bubble top and some mechanical parts had been found, but the engine and the rest of the body remained missing.

== Features ==
Silhouette was built on a shortened 1956 Buick chassis. Cushenbery hand-hammered the body out of 20-gauge steel. In the style of some other show rods of the time, Cushenbery added a bubble canopy roof — front-hinged and supplied by Acry Plastics in this case. The body was candy-painted with a mixture of black, red, and gold.

Silhouette made extensive use of electric controls on the dash or hidden in the car's trim for things like raising and lowering the bubble top, opening the hood and trunk, starting the engine, turning on and off the lights, and running the blower fans.

The tires were mounted on reversed Cadillac wheels.

The car was originally powered by a Buick Nailhead V8 that was later fitted with Hilborn fuel injection.

By the time the car appeared in Ford's Custom Car Caravan, the Buick engine had been swapped out for a 427 cu in (7.0 L) Ford FE engine.

== Models and media ==
Silhouette appeared in the 1965 movie "Beach Ball".

It was also in the opening and closing sequences of the 1968 television special "Wonderful World of Wheels", driven by narrator Lloyd Bridges.

A 1/25 scale model of the car was issued, then revised and reissued twice more, by AMT.

A 1/64 scale model of Silhouette was one of the original "Sweet 16" Hot Wheels cars released in 1968. A model of the car was also manufactured in 1/43 scale by Mebetoys, and sold in the US as part of their "Gran Toros" line, and in Italy as part of their "Serie Sputafuoco", or "Spitfire series". Mebetoys was bought by Mattel in 1969.

Silhouette was mentioned in a magazine article written by Tom Wolfe titled "The Kandy-Kolored Tangerine-Flake Streamline Baby".

== Featured appearances ==
- Rod & Custom, January 1963
- Hot Rod magazine, May 1963
- Car Craft, August 1963 — ROD SPECIAL, A Profile of Bill Cushenbery
- Popular Customs, January 1966
- Hot Rod Deluxe, May 2009 — 15th Annual Oakland Roadster Show, 1963
