= The Hollywood Reporter =

American magazine and website

- May 19, 2021, cover of The Hollywood Reporter print magazine, featuring Billy Porter
- Editorial Director: Nekesa Mumbi Moody
- Categories: Entertainment
- Frequency: Weekly
- Publisher: Elisabeth D. Rabishaw; Victoria Gold
- Founder: William R. Wilkerson
- First issue: September 3, 1930; 96 years ago
- Company: Eldridge Industries
- Country: United States
- Based in: Los Angeles, California, U.S.
- Language: English
- Website: hollywoodreporter.com
- ISSN: 0018-3660
- OCLC: 44653726

The Hollywood Reporter (THR) is an American digital and print magazine which focuses on the film, television, theatre, and entertainment industries. It was founded in 1930 as a daily trade paper, and in 2010 switched to a weekly large-format print magazine with a revamped website. As of 2020, the day-to-day operations of the company are handled by Penske Media Corporation through a joint venture with Eldridge Industries.

The Hollywood Reporter has international editions in several countries. The magazine also sponsors and hosts major industry events.

== History ==
=== Foundation and early years ===
The Hollywood Reporter was founded in 1930 by William R. "Billy" Wilkerson (1890–1962) as Hollywood's first daily entertainment trade newspaper. The first edition appeared on September 3, 1930, and featured Wilkerson's front-page "Tradeviews" column, which became influential. The newspaper appeared Monday-to-Saturday for the first 10 years, except for a brief period, then Monday-to-Friday from 1940. Wilkerson used caustic articles and gossip to generate publicity and was noticed by the studio bosses in New York and some studio lots tried to ban the paper.

In 1932, Variety sued The Hollywood Reporter, alleging that THR was plagiarizing information from Variety following its publication in New York on Tuesdays, by way of phoning or wiring the information back to Hollywood, so that THR could publish the information before Variety reached Hollywood three days later on Friday. Then, in 1933, Variety started its own daily Hollywood edition, Daily Variety, to cover the film industry.

Screenwriter and ardent anti-Communist Jack Moffitt, who had written the scripts for dozens of films during Hollywood's Golden Age and was the father of model and actress Peggy Moffitt, wrote many reviews for THR after being hired by Wilkerson in 1955.

Wilkerson became friends with Howard Hughes and the paper wrote many favorable stories about him and his film plans. In return, Hughes, in addition to advertising revenue, also provided financial assistance to the paper when necessary.

Wilkerson ran The Hollywood Reporter until his death in September 1962, although his final column appeared 18 months prior. Wilkerson's wife, Tichi Wilkerson Kassel, took over as publisher and editor-in-chief when her husband died.

==== Hollywood blacklist ====
From the late 1930s, Wilkerson used The Hollywood Reporter to push the view that the industry was a communist stronghold. In particular, he opposed the screenplay writers' trade union, the Screen Writers Guild, which he called the "Red Beachhead." In 1946 the Guild considered creating an American Authors' Authority to hold copyright for writers, instead of ownership passing to the studios. Wilkerson devoted his "Tradeviews" column to the issue on July 29, 1946, headlined "A Vote for Joe Stalin." He went to confession before publishing it, knowing the damage it would cause, but was apparently encouraged by the priest to go ahead with it.

The column contained the first industry names, including Dalton Trumbo and Howard Koch, on what became the Hollywood blacklist, known as "Billy's list." Eight of the 11 people Wilkerson named were among the "Hollywood Ten" who were blacklisted after hearings in 1947 by the House Un-American Activities Committee. When Wilkerson died in 1962, his THR obituary said that he had "named names, pseudonyms and card numbers and was widely credited with being chiefly responsible for preventing communists from becoming entrenched in Hollywood production."

In 1997 THR reporter David Robb wrote a story about the newspaper's involvement, but the editor, Robert J. Dowling, declined to run it. For the blacklist's 65th anniversary in 2012, the THR published a lengthy investigative piece about Wilkerson's role, by reporters Gary Baum and Daniel Miller. The same edition carried an apology from Wilkerson's son W. R. Wilkerson III. He wrote that his father had been motivated by revenge for his thwarted ambition to own a studio.

=== 1988–2008; BPI Communications ===
Tichi Wilkerson Kassel (left) with Sharon Stone in 2002

On April 11, 1988, Tichi Wilkerson Kassel sold the paper to BPI Communications, owned by Affiliated Publications, for $26.7 million. Robert J. Dowling became THR president in 1988, and editor-in-chief and publisher in 1991. Dowling hired Alex Ben Block as editor in 1990. Block and Teri Ritzer damped much of the sensationalism and cronyism that was prominent in the paper under the Wilkersons. In 1994, BPI Communications was sold to Verenigde Nederlandse Uitgeverijen (VNU) for $220 million.

In March 2006 a private equity consortium led by Blackstone and KKR, both with ties to the conservative movement in the United States, acquired THR along with the other assets of VNU. It joined those publications with AdWeek and A.C. Nielsen to form The Nielsen Company.

Matthew King, vice president for content and audience, editorial director Howard Burns, and executive editor Peter Pryor left the paper in a wave of layoffs in December 2006; editor Cynthia Littleton, widely respected throughout the industry, reported directly to Kilcullen. The Reporter absorbed another blow when Littleton left her position for an editorial job at Variety in March 2007. Web editor Glenn Abel also left after 16 years with the paper.

From 1988 to 2014, Daily Variety and The Hollywood Reporter were both located on Wilshire Boulevard, along Miracle Mile. In March 2007, The Hollywood Reporter surpassed Daily Variety to achieve the largest total distribution of any entertainment daily.

=== 2009–2010: Prometheus Global ownership ===
In December 2009, Prometheus Global Media, a newly formed company formed by Pluribus Capital Management and Guggenheim Partners, and chaired by Jimmy Finkelstein, CEO of News Communications, parent of political journal The Hill, acquired THR from Nielsen Business Media. It pledged to invest in the brand and grow the company. Richard Beckman, formerly of Condé Nast, was appointed as CEO.

In 2010, Beckman recruited Janice Min, the former editor-in-chief of Us Weekly, as editorial director to "eviscerate" the existing daily trade paper and reinvent it as a glossy, large-format weekly magazine. The Hollywood Reporter relaunched with a weekly print edition and a revamped website that enabled it to break news. Eight months after its initial report, The New York Times took note of the many scoops THR had generated, adding that the new glossy format seemed to be succeeding with its "rarefied demographic", stating: "They managed to change the subject by going weekly... The large photos, lush paper stock and great design are a kind of narcotic here."

In 2011, Deadline Hollywood, a property of Penske Media Corporation, sued The Hollywood Reporter for more than $5 million, alleging copyright infringement. In 2013, THR's parent company settled the suit. According to The Wall Street Journal, "The lawsuit [was] widely viewed in Hollywood as a proxy for the bitter war for readers and advertising dollars... The two sides agreed on a statement reading in part: 'Prometheus admits that The Hollywood Reporter copied source code from Penske Media Corporation's Web site www.tvline.com; Prometheus and The Hollywood Reporter have apologized to Penske Media.'"

By February 2013 the Times returned to THR, filing a report on a party for Academy Award nominees the magazine had hosted at the Los Angeles restaurant Spago. Noting the crowd of top celebrities in attendance, the Times alluded to the fact that many Hollywood insiders were now referring to THR as "the new Vanity Fair." Ad sales since Min's hiring were up more than 50%, while traffic to the magazine's website had grown by 800%.

In January 2014, Janice Min was promoted to President/Chief Creative Officer of the Entertainment Group of Guggenheim Media, giving her oversight of THR and its sister brand Billboard. Min is joined by co-president John Amato, who is responsible for business initiatives.

Guggenheim Partners announced on December 17, 2015, that it would sell the Prometheus media properties to its executive Todd Boehly. The company was sold to Eldridge Industries in February 2017. On February 1, 2018, Eldridge Industries announced the merger of its media properties with Media Rights Capital to form Valence Media (later rebranded in 2020 as simply MRC).

In February 2017, Min announced she was stepping down from her role as President/Chief Creative Officer overseeing The Hollywood Reporter and Billboard to take on a new role at its parent company. Simultaneously, it was announced that longtime executive editor Matthew Belloni would take over as editorial director.

=== 2020–present: PMC joint venture (PMRC) ===
In April 2020, Belloni announced he was stepping down after 14 years at the publication in the wake of recent clashes with the company's leadership over editorial issues. At the end of April 2020, The Hollywood Reporter (THR) named Nekesa Mumbi Moody as the editorial director who was expected to begin on June 15, 2020.

In September 2020, Penske Media assumed the day-to-day operations of Billboard and The Hollywood Reporter through a joint venture with MRC known as PMRC. The agreement also included opportunities for MRC to develop content based on PMC's publications.

Established in 2020, PMRC is the parent company of THR, Variety, Rolling Stone, Billboard, Vibe, Music Business Worldwide, the annual Life is Beautiful music festival and an investment in the SXSW festival franchise that is expanding beyond its US roots next year with an edition in Sydney, Australia.

In April 2020, at least 20 staffers were laid off, including executive vice president and group publisher Lynne Segall.

On August 5, 2022, Boehly pulled out of the MRC joint venture, and bought back the assets he had contributed to it, including The Hollywood Reporter.

In June 2023, at least three staffers were laid off. A year later The Hollywood Reporter laid off a small number of editorial workers.

== Publishers ==
Founder Billy Wilkerson served as the publisher of THR until his death in September 1962. Wilkerson's wife, Tichi Wilkerson Kassel, took over as publisher and editor-in-chief when her husband died.

Robert J. Dowling, who was named president of THR when Kassel sold the company, became editor-in-chief and publisher in 1991.

Tony Uphoff assumed the publisher position in November 2005.

John Kilcullen replaced Uphoff in October 2006, as publisher of Billboard. Kilcullen was a defendant in Billboard's infamous "dildo" lawsuit, in which he was accused of race discrimination and sexual harassment. VNU settled the suit on the courthouse steps. Kilcullen "exited" Nielsen in February 2008 "to pursue his passion as an entrepreneur."

In April 2010, Lori Burgess was named as publisher. Burgess had been publisher of OK! magazine since October 2008. Michaela Apruzzese was named associate publisher, entertainment in May 2010. Apruzzese previously served as the director of movie advertising for Los Angeles Times Media Group.

Lynne Segall, former vice president and associate publisher, was named publisher and senior vice president in June 2011.

== Editions ==
=== Print ===
The weekly print edition of The Hollywood Reporter includes profiles, original photography and interviews with entertainment figures; articles about major upcoming releases and product launches; film reviews and film festival previews; coverage of the latest industry deals, TV ratings, box-office figures and analysis of global entertainment business trends and indicators; photos essays and reports from premieres and other red-carpet events; and the latest on Hollywood fashion and lifestyle.

=== Website ===
The Reporter published a primitive "satellite" digital edition in the late 1980s. It became the first daily entertainment trade paper to start a website in 1995. Initially, the site offered free news briefs with complete coverage firewalled as a premium paid service. In later years, the website became mostly free as it became more reliant on ad sales and less on subscribers. The website had already gone through a redesign by the time competitor Variety took to the web in 1998. In 2002 the Reporter's website won the Jesse H. Neal Award for business journalism. In November 2013, The Hollywood Reporter launched the style site Pret-a-Reporter.

THR.com, The Hollywood Reporter's website, re-launched in 2010, offers breaking entertainment news, reviews and blogs; original video content (and film and TV clips) and photo galleries; plus in-depth movie, television, music, awards, style, technology and business coverage. The website includes a blog called Heat Vision, which covers comic books, science fiction, and horror content. As of August 2013, Comscore measured 12 million unique visitors per month to the site.

== Editors and reporters ==
THR's editors have included Janice Min (2010–2017), Elizabeth Guider (2007–2010), Cynthia Littleton (2005–2007), Howard Burns (2001–2006), Anita Busch (1999–2001), and Alex Ben Block (1990–1999).

Alex Ben Block was hired as editor for special issues in 1990, and was promoted to editor of the daily edition in 1992. After Block left, former Variety film editor, Anita Busch, became editor between 1999 and 2001. Busch was credited with making the paper competitive with Variety.

In March 2006, Cynthia Littleton, former broadcast television editor and deputy editor, was named editor, but left the role a year later for an editorial job at Variety. In July 2007 THR named Elizabeth Guider as its new editor. An 18-year veteran of Variety, where she served as Executive Editor, Guider assumed responsibility for the editorial vision and strategic direction of The Hollywood Reporter's daily and weekly editions, digital content offerings and executive conferences. Guider left The Hollywood Reporter in early 2010.

In addition to hiring Eric Mika, Rose Eintstein and Elizabeth Guider, the Reporter hired the following staff in 2007:

- Todd Cunningham, former assistant managing editor of the LA Business Journal, as National Editor for The Hollywood Reporter: Premier Edition
- Steven Zeitchik as Senior Writer, based in New York, where he provide news analysis and features for the Premiere Edition
- Melissa Grego, former managing editor of TV Week, as Editor of HollywoodReporter.com
- Jonathan Landreth as the new Asian bureau chief, in addition to 13 new writers across Asia

However, staffing levels began to drop again in 2008. In April, Nielsen Business Media eliminated between 40 and 50 editorial staff positions at The Hollywood Reporter and its sister publications: Adweek, Brandweek, Editor & Publisher and Mediaweek. In December, another 12 editorial positions were cut at the trade paper. In addition, 2008 saw substantial turnover in the online department: THR.com Editor Melissa Grego left her position in July to become executive editor of Broadcasting & Cable, and Managing Editor Scott McKim left to become a new media manager at Knox College. With the entertainment industry as a whole shrinking, "Hollywood studios have cut more than $20 million from the Motion Picture Association of America budget this year. The resulting staff and program reductions are expected to permanently shrink the scope and size of the six-studio trade and advocacy group."

Staffing at THR in 2008 saw even further cutbacks with "names from today's tragic bloodletting of The Hollywood Reporter's staff" adding up quickly in the hard economic times at the end of 2008. "The trade has not only been thin, but only publishing digital version 19 days this holiday season. Film writers Leslie Simmons, Carolyn Giardina, Gregg Goldstein, plus lead TV critic Barry Garron and TV reporter Kimberly Nordyke, also special issues editor Randee Dawn Cohen out of New York and managing editor Harley Lond and international department editor Hy Hollinger, plus Dan Evans, Lesley Goldberg, Michelle Belaski, James Gonzalez were among those chopped from the masthead."

Gossip blogger Roger Friedman joined The Hollywood Reporter as a senior correspondent in May 2009, a year after being fired by Fox News for writing an article reviewing an illegally bootlegged copy of the movie X-Men Origins: Wolverine. Business Insider described it as a surprising and risky move. In March 2010, Friedman's employment agreement was not renewed by The Hollywood Reporter.

When Janice Min and Lori Burgess came on board in 2010, the editorial and sales staff increased nearly 50%, respectively. Min hired various recognized journalists in the entertainment industry, most notably Variety film critic Todd McCarthy after his firing from Variety in March 2010, as well as Kim Masters of NPR, Tim Goodman of the San Francisco Chronicle, Lacey Rose of Forbes, Pamela McClintock of Variety and Eriq Gardner of American Lawyer.

== Sponsorship, events, and shows ==
The Hollywood Reporter sponsors and hosts a number of major industry events and awards ceremonies. It hosted 13 such events in 2012, including the Women in Entertainment Breakfast, where it announced its annual Power 100 list of the industry's most powerful women; the Key Art Awards (for achievement in entertainment advertising and communications); Power Lawyers Breakfast; Next Gen (honoring the industry's 50 fastest-rising stars and executives age 35 and under); Nominees Night; and the 25 Most Powerful Stylists Luncheon.

The Hollywood Reporter has produced the group interview shows Close Up with The Hollywood Reporter and Off Script with The Hollywood Reporter.

== Brutally Honest Oscar Ballot ==
Since 2013, The Hollywood Reporter has published an annual feature called "Brutally Honest Oscar Ballot" where anonymous members of the Academy of Motion Picture Arts and Sciences explain their voting choices for the Academy Awards (Oscars). The feature was first published in February 2013 as a single interview with an anonymous director titled "An Oscar Voter's Brutally Honest Ballot." The magazine typically publishes three to four interviews each year. The Washington Post called the feature "the best part of Oscar season."

In April 2023, the Academy introduced a rule change aimed at curtailing the feature, saying that Academy voters "may not discuss [their] voting preferences and other members' voting preferences in a public forum. This includes comparing or ranking motion pictures, performances, or achievements in relation to voting. This also includes speaking with press anonymously." However, The Hollywood Reporter continues to publish the feature annually.

== International editions ==
The Hollywood Reporter Japan was launched in February 2023 in Japan as the first international edition of The Hollywood Reporter. The Hollywood Reporter Japan is published by Hersey Shiga Global under license from The Hollywood Reporter, LLC. It covers film, TV and entertainment news with a special focus on the Japanese Film and TV market, which includes Japan's vast anime industry and talent agencies. Its chairman is Tsukasa Shiga.

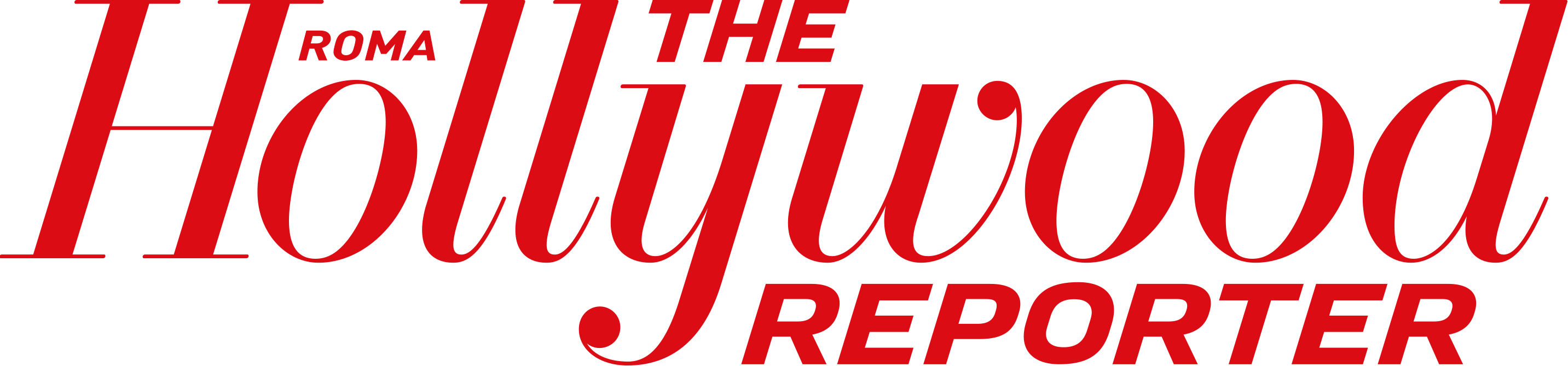
The official logo of The Hollywood Reporter Roma

The Hollywood Reporter Roma was launched in April 2023 in Italy as the first European edition of The Hollywood Reporter. The Hollywood Reporter Roma is published by Brainstore Media under license from The Hollywood Reporter, LLC. It is a multimedia platform covering local, national and European events aimed at the global market, with a focus on the Italian film, TV industry and culture. Concita De Gregorio was appointed as the magazine's first chairman, and served in the role until February 2024, being subsequently replaced by Boris Sollazzo. Since March of the same year, the writing staff of The Hollywood Reporter Roma publicly denounced the state of financial crisis affecting the magazine, with journalists, translators and external contributors reportedly not getting paid for months; an Il Post inquiry revealed a significant discrepancy between Brainstore Media's declared budget and the original financial plan presented by the company to PMRC in the due diligence phase. On 1 July, Sollazzo and the rest of the writing staff officially resigned from their jobs at the magazine. Since July 2024, the management has been assigned to Alessio De Giorgi.

In October 2024, an application for a composition agreement was filed with the Civil Court of Rome against Brainstore Media; given the inadmissibility of the application due to the company's failure to submit an agreement, on 3 April 2025, the company was ordered into judicial liquidation in relation to its creditors Unigrafica, Concita De Gregorio, and the representative of the public prosecutor's office. The newspaper ceased publishing news in June 2025, while maintaining its activities on social networks. Online operations ceased in July 2025.

The official logo of The Hollywood Reporter India

The Hollywood Reporter India was launched in 2024 in India. The Indian edition of The Hollywood Reporter has been launched under a licensing agreement between Penske Media Corporation and RPSG Lifestyle Media. Anupama Chopra has been appointed as the Editor of The Hollywood Reporter India.

The Hollywood Reporter En Español was launched in 2025 for Latin America and Spain.

The Hollywood Reporter Germany was launched in October 2025, the magazine is edited by Grace Maier who previously served as the editor-in-chief of L'Officiel Liechenstein from 2021 to 2025.

== See also ==
- Nielsen Business Media
- Variety
- List of film periodicals
