= William R. Wilkerson =

American film personality and publisher

- Born: William Richard Wilkerson; September 29, 1890; Nashville, Tennessee
- Died: September 2, 1962 (aged 71); Los Angeles, California
- Resting place: Holy Cross Cemetery, Culver City, California
- Occupations: Publisher, businessman
- Spouses: Helen Durkin; Edith Gwynn Goldenhorn; Rita Ann Seward; Estelle Jackson Brown; Vivian DuBois; Beatrice Ruby Noble

William Richard "Billy" Wilkerson (September 29, 1890 – September 2, 1962) was an American businessman who founded The Hollywood Reporter. He was real estate developer in Las Vegas and owner of such nightclubs as Ciro's. His series of columns known as "Billy's List" helped to initiate the red scare that led to the Hollywood blacklist. Wilkerson "discovered" Lana Turner.

== Personal life ==
Wilkerson was born on September 29, 1890, in Nashville, Tennessee. He began to study medicine in Philadelphia, Pennsylvania, but when his father died leaving extensive gambling debts, Wilkerson quit school to support himself and his mother. He became a compulsive gambler himself, but quit when his son was born in October 1951.

Wilkerson was in relatively poor health throughout the latter half of the 1950s due to decades of excessive smoking. He continued to head The Hollywood Reporter and write his daily "Tradeviews" column until shortly before his death. Wilkerson died of a heart attack on September 2, 1962, at his Bel-Air home, one day before The Hollywood Reporter's 32nd anniversary. He is interred at Holy Cross Cemetery in Culver City.

Wilkerson was married six times. His wives were:

- Helen Durkin - probably around 1913 or 1914 - probably New York or Fort Lee, New Jersey - Durkin died in the Spanish Influenza Epidemic of 1918.
- Edith Gwynn Goldenhorn - June 22, 1927 - Los Angeles, CA - August 7, 1935 - Cd. Juárez, Mexico
- Rita Ann Seward - September 30, 1935 - Las Vegas - May 9, 1938 - Los Angeles, California
- Estelle Jackson Brown - December 12, 1939 - Las Vegas, NV - August 13, 1942 - Reno, Nevada
- Vivian DuBois - May 9, 1946 - Las Vegas, Nevada - March 14, 1950 - Los Angeles, California
- Beatrice Ruby Noble - February 23, 1951 - Phoenix, AZ - His death

== Career ==
When a friend won a Fort Lee, New Jersey movie theater in a bet, Wilkerson agreed to manage it in exchange for half the profits. Expanding his work in the movie industry, he became district manager at Universal Pictures under Carl Laemmle.

=== The Hollywood Reporter ===
Wilkerson published the first issue of The Hollywood Reporter on September 3, 1930. Each issue began with a self-written editorial column titled "Tradeviews," which became highly influential in the entertainment industry.

In 1946, Wilkerson launched a series of columns identifying individuals he believed to be Communist sympathizers. Known informally as "Billy's List," these columns contributed to the rising anti-Communist sentiment in Hollywood and helped lay the groundwork for the Hollywood blacklist during the early years of the Red Scare.

=== Business ventures ===
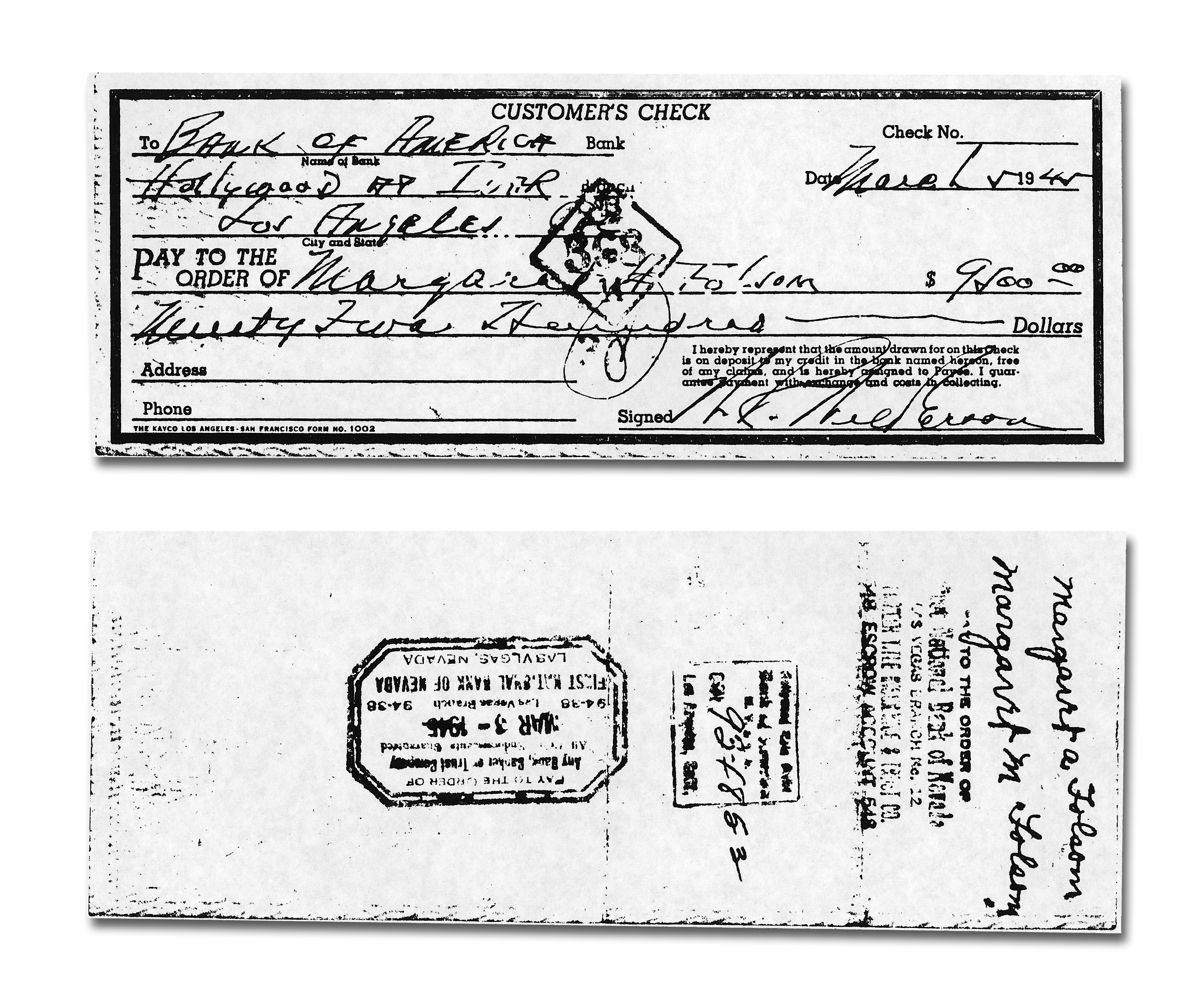
Partial payment to Margaret M. Folsom for the Flamingo land signed by William R. Wilkerson, March 5, 1945

Wilkerson opened a series of social nightspots on Los Angeles' Sunset Strip. Seeing opportunities in Las Vegas, he made key investments there as well.

Restaurants, nightclubs, and hotels that Wilkerson started:

- Vendome Wine & Spirits Co. (1933)
- Cafe Trocadero (1934)
- Sunset House (1936) (haberdashery & barbershop)
- The Arrowhead Springs Hotel (1939)
- Ciro's (1940)
- Restaurant La Rue (Sunset Strip) (1944)
- The Flamingo Hotel (1945) Wilkerson named the hotel, then began development and building of the property, but ran low of money. Bugsy Siegel soon moved in to help finish the hotel casino with mob financing, and Wilkerson eventually sold out his share to Siegel.
- L'Aiglon (1947)
- Club LaRue (of Las Vegas) (December 1950)
