= Ginny Durrin =

American filmmaker

Ginny Durrin is an American filmmaker. Her most well-known film is Promises to Keep, which was nominated for the Academy Award for Best Documentary Feature in 1988. She has also worked on documentary episodes for PBS series, including Hard Work (1978), Worker to Worker (1980), Can't Take No More (1980), Gulliver's Travels (1996), Walden (1997), Silent Killers: Poisons and Plagues (2003), and Homegrown: Islam in Prison (2007).

Durrin created Women in Film & Video DC in 1979. She has owned Durrin Productions, Inc. with her husband Kip Durrin since the early 1970s.

== Filmography ==
- Nan's Class (1978)
- Hard Work (1978)
- Worker to Worker (1980)
- Can't Take No More (1980)
- Promises to Keep (1988)
- Gulliver's Travels (1996)
- Walden (1997)
- Silent Killers: Poisons and Plagues (2003)
- Homegrown: Islam in Prison (2007)
