= El Fandi =

Spanish bullfighter (born 1981)

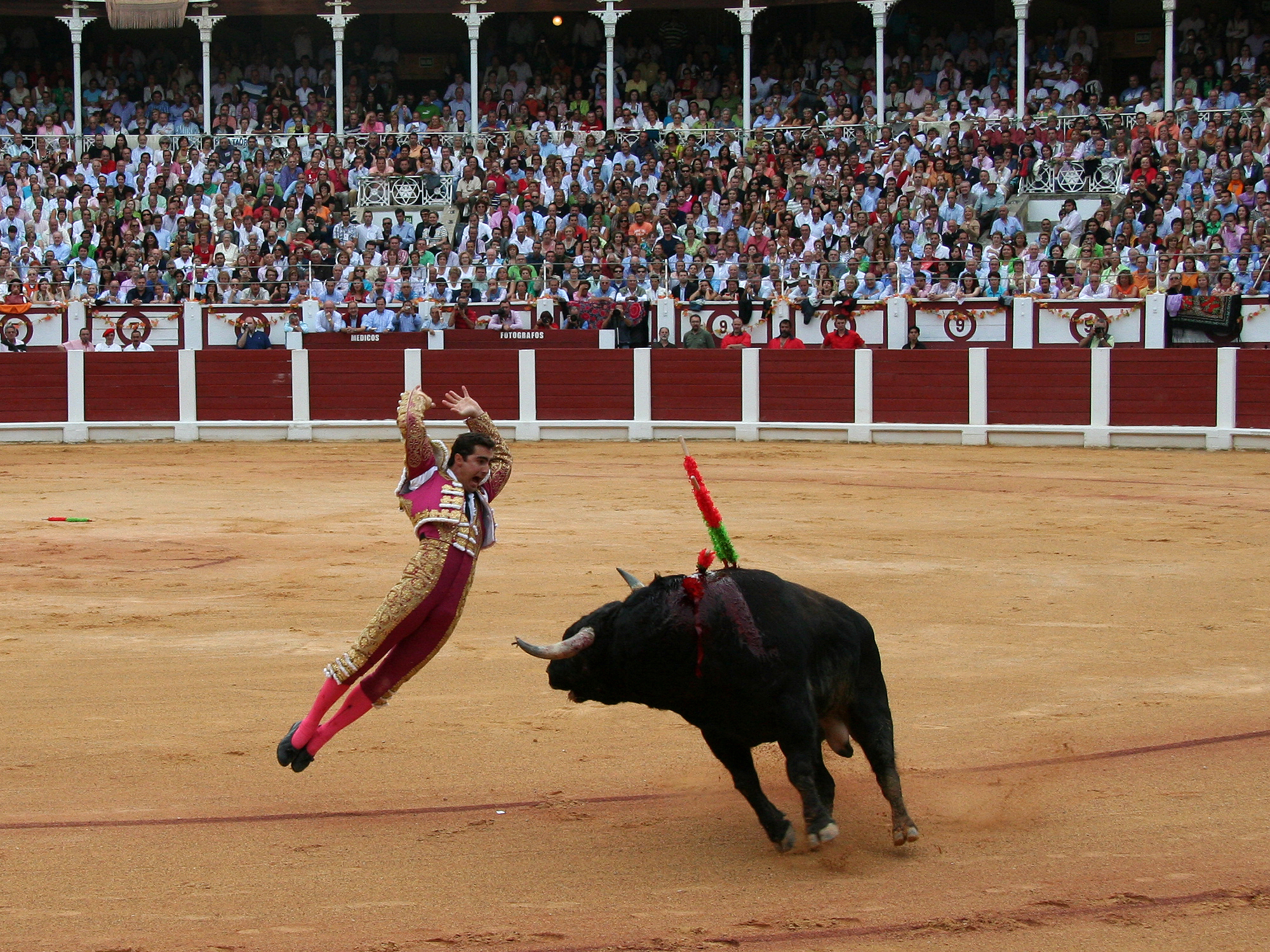
- El Fandi
- Born: David Fandila Marín; June 13, 1981 (age 44); Granada, Spain
- Known for: Bullfighting
- Website: www.el-fandi.com

David Fandila Marín (born June 13, 1981), commonly known by his nickname El Fandi, is a Spanish bullfighter.

El Fandi was a member of Spain's national skiing team in his teenage years. He attended the José Antonio Martín Municipal School for Bullfighting in Almería. He started his career as a picador in Santa Fe, near Granada, and debuted as a matador in 2000.

== Childhood ==
David Fandila Marín was born in Granada, Spain, the son of Trinidad Marín and Juan Fandila, a banderillero. His mother experienced a high-risk pregnancy and was advised to terminate it; she declined and carried the pregnancy to term. “It was a battle between David and Goliath,” Trinidad later recalled, “that’s the reason I named him David.”

David spent his early childhood in the Abazin, the Moorish quarter of Granada, before his parents moved to the Sierra Nevada, where they worked as guards. David and his brother, Juan Álvaro, took up skiing in the mountains, specializing in Alpine Skiing and acrobatic skiing. The brothers joined the Federacion Española de Esquí, where they competed; David won a national title.

== Early bullfighting ==
When he was four years old, David began to practice bullfighting using papers and rags in Pradollano Square. When he wanted to practice with the banderillas, he stuck forks in the sofa, pretending it was a bull.

‘El Fandi’ appeared for the first time in a Becerra (a bullfight with young bulls), in Armilla (Granada) on September 30, 1995. After a couple of these small bullfights, he made his first appearance as a novillero (bullfighting apprentice) on April 19, 1998, in Santa Fe (Granada).

El Fandi faced many hardships early in his career, having to fight in many difficult bullrings, many of which were close to Madrid. However, thanks to his agents, Antonio Rodriguez and Manolo Martín, he started to become a better bullfighter. In 1999, he was classified as one of the top banderilleros with 60 successful bullfights. Later in that year, he made his introduction to the world of bullfighting in the Monumental de Las Ventas in Madrid, where he cut one ear from his second bull, thus earning his first prize.

El Fandi finished his bullfights successfully in 1999. On October 31, he killed six bulls and cut five ears. Around this time, Emilio Miranda Casas and Santiago López began to represent El Fandi in his career. Emilio Miranda was the well-known and prestigious manager of the bullring in Granada. López was a retired matador, or bullfighter, and an agent to bullfighters with a lot of experience and a good reputation. Both men believed David could be the great bullfighter Granada was waiting for; however, it would be a long road. David needed to improve his fundamentals, and Santiago López worked hard with him.

The year 2000 began with one goal in mind: El Fandi was going to become a matador in la Feria del Corpus (a week-long fair in Granada honouring its city-saint, Corpus Christi). However, just before his alternative (a bullfight in which the junior bullfighter is presented to the crowd as a matador), he suffered a fracture in his right elbow in a bullfighting accident in Murcia. However, despite the fracture, El Fandi decided to fight and become a matador on June 18, 2000, in Granada. Standing as his "godfather" was José Mari Manzanares, while El July stood as the witness. The bull that fought in the ceremony was Elegance, supplied by the García Jiménez Brothers' ranch. That afternoon, while wearing protection on his right arm and fighting mainly with his left, El Fandi cut two ears and became a hero in Granada.

== Professional life ==
2001
In 2001, El Fandi had to compete in more bullfights and in bigger bullrings. He ended 2001 competing in a total of 39 bullfights.

2002
The biggest test of this year for El Fandi was fighting in Las Ventas in Madrid, where he had two bullfights. He triumphed in important bullrings like Valencia, San Sebastián, Pamplona, Bilbao, Málaga, Murcia, Algeciras, Alicante, Badajoz, and La Linea de la Concepción. Later that year, in Granada, he pardoned the life of a bull named Cortesano because the bull had shown exceptional bravery. By the end of the year, he had competed in 74 bullfights. He also competed in the United States, Mexico, and parts of South America for the first time.

2003
In 2003, El Fandi cut one tail in a bullfight in Granada, and earned trophies in Castellón, Huelva, Santander, Zaragoza and Jaén. He could not fight for a month due to a twisted ankle. However, at the end of 2003, El Fandi had competed in 73 fights, cutting 9 tails and 120 ears.

2004
The challenge of 2004 was to compete in 100 bullfights, but in October, El Fandi decided to end with 97 bullfights. It was one of the most important years in his career, in which he fought in bullrings in Madrid, Sevilla, Valencia, Córdoba, Zaragoza, San Sebastian, and Barcelona. He again pardoned the life of a bull, this one named Sevillano. He ended the year with 97 fights, 195 ears, 7 tails, and 59 puertas grandes.

2005
In 2005, El Fandi reached the top of his classification, participating in 104 bullfights and earning 205 ears, 10 tails, and 63 puertas grandes. On May 28, he fought 6 bulls during la Feria del Corpus in Granada. El Fandi was seriously injured by the third bull, and had to have his leg operated on for 45 minutes. However, he returned to the bullring to kill the remaining bulls with 2 severe injuries in his leg. He ended the day cutting 7 ears, 1 tail, and leaving through the puerta grande.

2006
El Fandi topped his classification again in 2006 after 108 bullfights, 221 ears, 15 tails, and 72 puertas grandes.

2007
On June 24, 2007, El Fandi suffered an injury to his right index finger. As a result, he lost 25 bullfights within a month and a half. Despite this, he came back and triumphed in Barcelona, Zaragoza, and various other bullrings throughout Spain and South America.

2008
El Fandi competed in 8 bullfights in 2008, cutting 19 ears and 1 tail.

Date	Location
March 15	Valencia
March 16	Jaén
March 21	Benidorm (Alicante)
March 22	Lucena (Córdoba)
March 30	Vejer de la Frontera (Cádiz)
April 5	Vistalegre (Madrid)
April 6	Cercedilla (Madrid)
April 12	Sevilla
April 19	Barcelona
May 2	Jerez de la Frontera (Cádiz)
May 11	Palencia
June 21	La Muela (Zaragoza)
July 18	Roquetas de Mar (Almería)
September 27	Abarán (Murcia)

El Fandi was the subject of a documentary film entitled "The Matador," which received critical acclaim for its cinematography, editing, and musical score. The New York Times stated it features "more drama than most blockbusters".

He also ran in the 2008 New York City Marathon.

== His Cuadrilla ==
A cuadrilla is a bullfighter’s entourage. It is made up of the men who help him while in the ring and those who help with his public relations. Currently, these men make up El Fandi’s cuadrilla:

- Toño Matilla (Agent)
- Juan Carlos Pérez Roldán. Carlos “Chicote” (Banderillero)
- Óscar Padilla Bernal (Banderillero)
- Basilio Martín López (Banderillero)
  - The banderilleros help a fighter in the ring during the second stage of the fight. They are responsible for putting three sets of banderillas (sticks adorned with sashes) into the bull’s back.
- José Manuel González Cruz (Picador, or Lancer)
- Juan de Dios Quinta Caballero (Picador)
  - The picadors are the men who help the matador in the first stage of the bullfight. While the matador fights the bull with a cloak, the picadors use a lance while on horseback to test the bull and prepare him for the final performance.
- Rodrigo Rufo del Castillo Monje (mozo de espadas, or sword page)
  - The mozo de espadas is the matador’s assistant who helps him get dressed and hands him the cape and sword during the fight.
- Juan Álvaro Fandila Marín (Public Relations)
- Pedro Fernández Martínez (Chauffeur)

== In the media ==
A biographical movie titled The Matador premiered at the South by Southwest Film Festival in March 2008. The movie is directed by Stephen Higgins and Nina Gilden Seavey.
