= Camerata Romeu =

Camerata Romeu is an all-female instrumentalist chamber music group founded and led by Zenaida Castro Romeu, orchestral director and composer from a family of Cuban performers and composers spanning several generations. The orchestra's musical focus is playing European style classical music while drawing on the popular rhythms of Cuba taken from Spanish, African and Latin American Indians.

== History ==
Camerata Romeu toured Florida in 1998, and performed at the Repertorio Español.

The group was nominated at the Latin Grammy Awards of 2003 for the Best Flamenco Album and at the Latin Grammy Award for Best Classical Contemporary Composition in 2008.

Cinematic journalist, filmmaker and co-founder of Accent Media, Cecilia Domeyko, created a documentary of Camerata Romeu, entitled Cuba Mia: Portrait of an All-Woman Orchestra, which in 2003 won the Silver Screen awards at the US International Film & Video Festival."

The ensemble performs regularly at the Festival de Música Contemporánea in Havana. Coverage of the 2009 Festival.

In 2015, Camerata Romeu performed at the Festival Mozart Habana.

== Discography ==
- La Bella Cubana: New Classical Cuban Music, Released 1996
- Cervantes, Released 1999
- Cuba Mía, Released 2001
- Danza De Las Brujas, Released 2005
- Raigal, Released 2006
- Tampa Habana Oslo – En Vivo, Released 2007
- La Bella Cubana, Released 2007
- Non Divisi – Roberto Valera Y Camerata Romeu, Released 2008
- Saudações, with Egberto Gismonti, Released 2009

== Filmography ==
- Cuba Mia: Portrait Of An All-Woman Orchestra – DVD, Released 2005
- Concierto Del Norte – DVD, Released 2010
