= ReFrame =

American non-profit organisation

- Formation: February 22, 2017; 9 years ago
- Founder: Women in Film and Television International; Sundance Institute
- Type: Non-profit
- Purpose: To celebrate and promote gender parity with greater inclusion of women in the media industry
- Headquarters: 4221 Wilshire Boulevard; Los Angeles, California, U.S.
- Website: www.reframeproject.org
- Formerly called: The Systemic Change Project

ReFrame (also known as ReFrame Project; formerly known as the Systemic Change Project) is an American non-profit organization founded by Women in Film LA and the Sundance Institute together with over 50 leaders and influencers in Hollywood, with the goal of providing research, support, and a practical framework to its partner companies to give them a way to "mitigate bias during the creative decision-making and hiring process, celebrate successes, and measure progress toward a more gender-representative industry on all levels". Alison Emilio serves as the director.

== History ==
The Systemic Change Project, a joint venture between Women in Film and the Sundance Institute, originated from a secret meeting of 44 Hollywood leaders to address the gender parity issue in the industry. From the Systemic Change Project, ReFrame was founded by a group of ReFrame Ambassabors, active male and female leaders across the entertainment industry ranging from studio heads to guild representatives, ReFrame seeks to use a developed research-based action plan to promote gender parity, inclusivity, diversity, and increase the presence of women in the media industry.

== Programs ==
=== 14-Point Culture Change and Production Roadmap ===
Building on existing diversity programs, the roadmap provides tools, training, and practices tailored to entertainment executives and creative teams to address the systemic barriers in the creative and financial aspects of the business.

=== ReFrame Rise Directors Program ===
On June 12, 2019, the ReFrame Rise Directors Program was announced as a mentorship program. It was an industry-wide two-year sponsorship that identified promising female directors poised to lead studio features and TV projects, and provided them with endorsement and support. Those selected for ReFrame Rise received complimentary IMDbPro memberships.

=== ReFrame Stamp ===
The ReFrame Stamp is a distinction awarded to film and TV productions that satisfy predetermined criteria with a large number of women in key roles in front and behind the camera as actresses, members of the production, and department heads. Criteria for the award includes having a female protagonist with top billing, female characters with a lot of screen time, female directors and screenwriters with additional recognition towards women of color in main roles. The stamp is awarded based on the number of points fulfilled by the aforementioned criteria. After a film or television program is awarded the stamp, a logo is added to the end credits.

== See also ==
- Geena Davis Institute on Gender in Media
