= Operation Matador =

Operation Matador may refer to:

- Operation Matador (1941), a proposed plan to counter any Imperial Japanese perceived threat to British Malaya
- Operation Matador (1945), a Burma campaign operation during World War II
- Operation Matador (1966), a United States Army campaign of the Vietnam War
- Operation Matador (1975), a plan by the Central Intelligence Agency
- Operation Matador (Iraq) or Battle of Al Qaim, a 2005 Iraq operation
- Operation Matador (2011), a judicialized wiretap program which the United States currently operates in conjunction with Panama's police and security services
