= National Association of Telecommunications Officers and Advisors =

The National Association of Telecommunications Officers and Advisors (NATOA) is a US-based professional membership association that provides support to members on the many local, state, and federal communications laws, administrative rulings, judicial decisions, and technology issues impacting the interests of local governments. Founded in 1980, NATOA offers a wide range of advocacy services to individual and agency members representing cities, towns, counties and commissions across the country. NATOA has a headquarters office in Alexandria, VA, and is served by a twelve-member volunteer board of directors composed of members from across the country.

== Leadership ==
The National Association of Telecommunication Officers and Advisors is overseen by a board of directors that consists of eleven voting Directors (one President, one President-Elect and nine Directors) and one non-voting Director (the Immediate Past President) all of whom must maintain status as a voting member of the association throughout the duration of their terms. The Board of Directors shall have the authority to appoint, at its option, an Executive Committee which is composed of the President, President-elect, and Secretary-Treasurer.

The current President of NATOA is Chris Seidt, City of Louisville, KY

Past Presidents of NATOA:
2023 - 2025 - Rick Assmus, Arvada, CO
2021 - 2023 - Michael Russo, Calabasas, CA
2019 - 2021 - Brian Roberts, San Francisco, CA
2017 - 2019 - Mike Lynch, Boston MA
2015 - 2017 - Jodie Miller, Inver Grove Heights, MN
2013 - 2015 - Tony Perez, Seattle, WA
2011 - 2013 - Joanne Hovis
2009 - 2011 - Ken Fellman, Arvada, CO
2007 - 2009 - Mary Beth Henry, Portland, OR
2006 - 2007 - Paul Berra, St. Louis, MO
2005 - 2006 - Doris Boris, Charlotte, NC
2004 - 2005 - Lori Panzino-Tillery, San Bernardino County, CA
2003 - 2004 - Coralie Wilson - Roseville, MN
2001 - 2003 - Denise Brady - San Francisco, CA
2000 - 2001 - Ron Mallard - Fairfax County, VA
1999 - 2000 - Darryl Anderson - Washington DC
1998 - 1999 - Jane Lawton - Montgomery County, MD
1997 - 1998 - Tom Weisner - Aurora, IL
1996 - 1997 - Byron West - Denver, CO
1995 - 1996 - Mike Reardon - St. Paul, MN
1994 - 1995 - Susan Littlefield - St. Louis, MO
1993 - 1994 - Bill Squadron - New York City, NY
1992 - 1993 - David Olson - Portland, OR
1990 - 1992 - Susan Herman - Santa Monica, CA
1988 - 1990 - Paul Berra - St. Louis, MO
1987 - 1988 - Donna Mason - Vancouver, WA
1985 - 1987 - Bill Bradley - Denver, CO
1983 - 1985 - John Hansman - Rockville, MD
1980 - 1983 - Frank Greif - Seattle, WA

== History ==
Originally named the Association of Cable Regulators, NATOA formed in 1980 as an affiliated association with the National League of Cities (NLC), before eventually became an independent association shortly thereafter.

== Membership & Chapters ==
NATOA represents local governments across the country. Members include cities, counties, towns, villages and commissions. NATOA also has regional chapters that are affiliated with the national NATOA organization. Chapters include:

CAPATOA – National Capital Association of Telecommunications Officers & Advisors
CCUA – Colorado Communications and Utility Alliance
HITOA - Hawaii
ILNATOA - Illinois
JAG - Jersey Access Group
KATOA - Kentucky
MICMA - Michigan
MACTA - Minnesota
OATOA - Oregon
TATOA - Texas
VATOA - Virginia
WATOA - Washington

== Activities ==
NATOA hosts an Annual Conference each year, providing members the opportunity to gather and learn from the best in the field. The conference features an exhibit tradeshow, educational workshops, networking opportunities, roundtable discussions, and presentation of the winners of the Government Programming Awards (GPAs) and the Community Broadband & Digital Equity Awards.

The Government Programming Awards (GPAs) are annual awards that recognize broadcast, cable, multimedia and electronic programming produced by local government agencies. Categories cover a variety of programming including, among others, community events, documentary, public affairs and public service, interview/talk show, performing arts, sports, election coverage and children’ s issues.

NATOA offers additional educational opportunities through its eNATOA series, low-cost monthly webinars on various topics of interest to members.

NATOA also publishes an electronic newsletter eN-Light, and hosts list serve forums.

== See also ==
- Cable television in the United States
- Public-access television
- Educational-access television
- Government-access television
- List of public-access TV stations in the United States
