= Nina Gilden Seavey =

Nina Gilden Seavey is a documentary filmmaker, podcaster, author, and educator. She holds the academic rank of Research Professor Emerita of History of and Media and Public Affairs at George Washington University (GWU). She was the founding director of the Documentary Center at GW, which she launched in October 1990, before stepping down in 2020. In 2017, Seavey was named a visiting research scholar at the Schuster Institute for Investigative Journalism at Brandeis University.

Seavey also served as founding director and executive producer for SILVERDOCS: AFI-Discovery Channel Documentary Film Festival (now known as AFI Docs) between 2002 and 2008.

Beginning in 2020, Seavey formed Seavey Media, LLC a firm focusing on developing content across multiple platforms. The range of her work can be seen at seaveymedia.com. Publicly available video can be seen on Seavey's Youtube Channel.

In addition to her various media projects, Seavey joined the faculty of the Maine Media Workshops and College where she frequently offers short courses on various aspects of documentary production.

== Early life ==
Nina Beth Gilden, grew up in St. Louis, Missouri the daughter of civil rights attorney, Louis Gilden, and clinical psychologist Joanne Bamberger Gilden. She has three brothers, Carey Wayne Gilden (deceased), David Loren Gilden, and Daniel Joseph Gilden. She attended school K-12 in University City, Missouri. In 1974–1975 she was a foreign exchange student via the American Field Service (AFS) to Tournai, Belgium where she attended the Institut Ste. Andre. Upon returning to the US, she briefly studied at Mount Holyoke College and received her B.A. in History and French Literature from Washington University in St. Louis (1978). She holds a master's degree in history from George Washington University (1991).

== Personal life ==
In 1985, Gilden married Ormond Seavey Jr. a professor of English at George Washington University and they moved to Takoma Park, MD, where they still reside. Upon her marriage, she officially changed her name to Nina Gilden Seavey. They have three children.

== Political career ==
Gilden's political career began very early when she became the youngest paid member of the McGovern for President Campaign in 1972 serving on the Missouri State staff at the age of 15. After the campaign, she joined the secondary boycott committee for the striking United Farm Workers Union in St. Louis. Soon after she served as the Eastern Missouri volunteer coordinator for presidential candidate Morris Udall in 1976.

In 1978 Gilden moved to Washington, D.C., where she ran the political action committee for the Coalition for a New Foreign and Military Policy during the mid-term elections. Immediately after the election, she was hired by Congresswoman Patricia Schroeder (D-CO) to serve as her legislative staff to the House Armed Services Committee. In 1980, Gilden was hired by the Office of the Secretary of Defense to serve as a special advisor in the Office of the Assistant Secretary for Manpower, Reserve Affairs, and Logistics working on issues relating to the integration of women into the military academies and aboard combatant naval vessels and aircraft. In the wake of the Republican landslide during the 1980 elections, Gilden left politics.

== Career in film ==
Seavey began her career in media initially working for media entrepreneur Alexander Sheftell developing radio programming for Mutual Broadcasting Corporation. In 1983, she and Sheftel became producers, along with Dan Enright, on the nationally syndicated Jack Anderson Confidential. In 1984, Seavey produced for a number of broadcasters including WMAR-TV in Baltimore and the WETA nationally distributed weekly, The Lawmakers. In 1990, she developed a partnership with Academy Award-winning filmmaker, Paul Wagner, and they produced several films for the Smithsonian's National Postal Museum, the Discovery Channel, and for PBS. In 1998, Seavey began producing and directing films independently.

Seavey is a frequent panelist for film funding and prizes for organizations such as the National Endowment for the Humanities, The Southern Humanities Media Fund, the International Documentary Association, The Jack Kent Cooke Family Foundation, The Heinz Family Foundation, and the News and Documentary Emmy Awards, among many others.

In addition to her film, television, and podcast projects, Seavey is a prolific author. Her written works can be found in books, industry trade publications, as well in scholarly, popular and literary journals.

== Honors and legacy ==
Seavey was named the “Woman of Vision” by Women in Film and Video in 2006.

== Films, television, and podcasts - major credits ==
- The Battle of the Alamo (1996) – producer and co-director (Discovery Channel)
- . . . . And There We Wandered Sometimes West, co-producer (1997), (Signature Communications and the National Park Service)
- A Paralyzing Fear: The Story of Polio in America (1998) – producer, director, and writer (PBS and PBS Video)
- The Ballad of Bering Strait (2002) – director and producer (Emerging Pictures, VIACOM for CMT, VH1, and MTV, Rainbow Media, and Koch Lorber Video)
- The Open Road: America Looks at Aging (2005) – director and producer (PBS through APT and First Run Features)
- A Short History of Sweet Potato Pie and How it Became a Flying Saucer (2006) – director and co-producer (Snag Films)
- The Matador (2008) – producer and co-director (City Lights Pictures, Sundance Channel, Warner Brothers Home Entertainment)
- 4Th and Goal (2011) – director and co-producer (Gravitas Ventures and Warner Brothers Home Entertainment)
- The War At Home (2012) – director and co-writer (Signature Communications and the National Park Service)
- Parables of War (2015) – director and producer (Gravitas Ventures, 2016)
- "My Fugitive" (2021) – host and co-writer (Pineapple Street Studios, 2021)

== Selected awards ==
- Emmy Award for Best Research in a Documentary Film, 1998 for A Paralyzing Fear: The Story of Polio in America, 1998
- Emmy nominations for Best Editing (Cathy Shields) and Best Original Score (Paul Christianson) for A Paralyzing Fear: The Story of Polio in America, 1998
- Erik Barnouw Prize for Best Historical Film of the Year, 1998 for A Paralyzing Fear: The Story of Polio in America
- Gold Medal for Best International Broadcast, International Cindy Competition, for A Paralyzing Fear: The Story of Polio in America, 2000
- International Documentary Association, ABC Video News Source Nominee for A Paralyzing Fear: The Story of Polio in America, 1999
- Benjamin Franklin Award for Best Outreach for a Documentary Film for A Paralyzing Fear: The Story of Polio in America, 2000
- Emmy Award nomination for Best Director for The Ballad of Bering Strait, 2003
- International Documentary Association, Distinguished Achievement in a Documentary Short nominee, for A Short History of Sweet Potato Pie and How it Became a Flying Saucer, 2006
- Emmy Award nomination for Best Original Score (John Califra) for The Matador, 2008
- Special Cine Jury Award for Best Independent Documentary for The Matador, 2010
- Italian National Olympic Committee Cup, 29th Annual FICTS "Sport Movies & TV - Milano International FICTS Fest", Italy for 4th & GOAL, 2011
- Best Film, National Association for Interpretation Media for The War at Home, 2013.
- Peter C Rollins Prize for Best Film in American Culture for Parables of War, 2016
