= Women in Film and Television (South Africa) =

Network of women in the film and TV industry

- Abbreviation: WIFTSA
- Formation: 2005
- Founder: Fiona Tudor Price
- Type: Not-for-profit network
- Purpose: Advancing the professional development and empowerment of women working in the film and television industry in South Africa.
- Headquarters: South Africa
- Services: Networking events, summits, development programmes, lecture series, annual film festival (Women's Month Celebration)
- Parent organization: Women in Film and Television International (WIFTI)
- Affiliations: Cape Film Commission, Atomic Productions, South African Broadcasting Corporation (SABC), Sithenghi Film Festival

Women in Film and Television (South Africa) (WIFTSA) is the South Africa chapter of Women in Film and Television International WIFTI, a not-for-profit network of women dedicated to advancing the professional development and empowerment of women working in the film and television industry. WIFTI has more than 10,000 members across a network of 37 member organizations.

WIFTSA is an inclusive organization for women of all backgrounds whose members work at all levels of the industry - from the owners of production companies to directors, entertainment lawyers, actresses, camerawomen, make-up artists and students.

WIFTSA organizes networking events, summits, development programmes and lecture series for its members. WIFTSA additionally runs an annual film festival: Women's Month Celebration which screens films and documentaries by South African women.

== History ==
WIFTSA was founded in 2005 by Fiona Tudor Price with support from the Cape Film Commission, Atomic Productions, the South African Broadcasting Corporation (SABC) and the Sithenghi Film Festival.
