= Matador (cocktail) =

Tequila-based cocktail

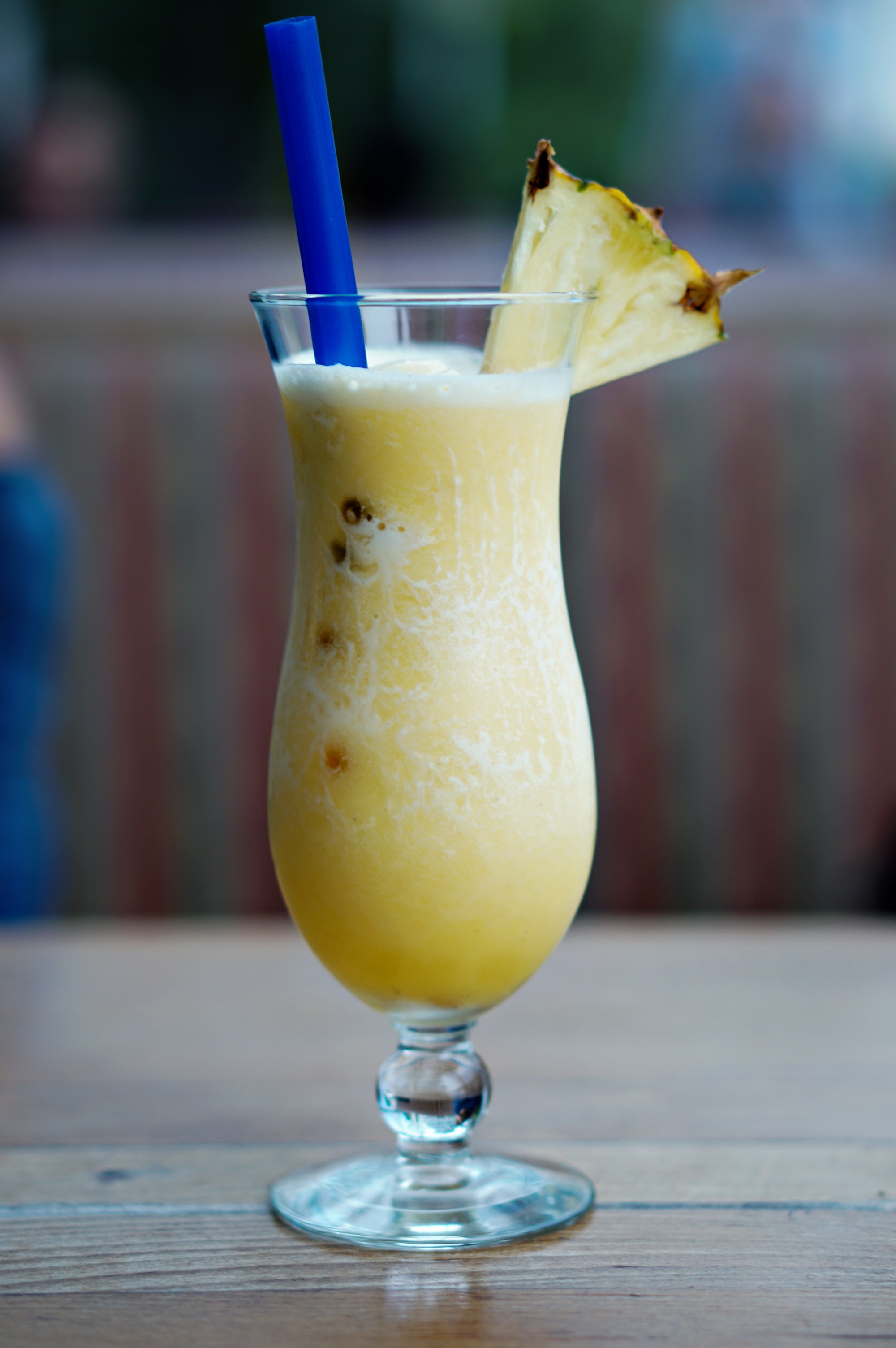
- Type: Cocktail
- Ingredients: 1 to 1.5 parts silver or blanco tequila; 2 to 3 parts pineapple juice; Juice of half a lime
- Base spirit: Tequila
- Standard drinkware: Cocktail glass
- Standard garnish: lime slice or twist
- Served: shaken
- Preparation: Mix the ingredients in a shaker half full of ice. Strain and serve in a chilled cocktail glass or champagne flute.

The Matador is a tequila-based cocktail. Less widely known than the margarita, its structure is similarly simple, with three primary ingredients: silver or blanco tequila, pineapple juice, and lime juice. Its chief coupling of pineapple and a single spirit resembles a Jackhammer, a variant of the Screwdriver which substitutes pineapple juice for orange juice to mix with vodka. Matadors are often presented differently, either in a martini glass or a champagne flute.

== Background ==
The cocktail combines three Mexican exports: tequila, pineapple and lime. Due to typically high natural sugar content in many pineapple varieties, or use of sweetened commercially produced pineapple juice, additional sweeteners are not usually added.

The Tequila Matador was first printed in 1972 in Trader Vic's Bartender's Guide.

In addition to these details, Matador is a commercial brand of tequila, though usage of a specifically branded spirit here is variable, similar to ingredient usage in other cocktails.

== See also ==
- List of cocktails
