= Women in Film & Video Film Festival D.C. =

WIFV annual film festival is an annual film festival sponsored by Women in Film and Video, Washington, D.C. chapter. They were co-sponsored by the American Film Institute, with grants by the National Endowment for the Arts.

== Films screened ==
- 1985 The Return of the Soldier Julie Christie, Summerspell Lina Shanklin, A Woman Like Eve Nouchka van Brakel, Far from Poland Jill Godmilow, Ornette: Portrait of A Jazz Pioneer Shirley Clarke, La Quarantine Anne Claire Poirier
- 1987 Square Dance Jane Alexander, Dad End Kids JoAnne Akalaitis, Working Girls Lizzie Borden, The Passion of Remembrance
- 1989 Gingerale Afternoon, God's Will Julia Cameron, Misplaced Lisa Zwerling, Shag Julie Brown
- 1996 Your Name in Cellulite Gail Noonan, Lipstick Harriet McKern, Naked Acts Brigett M. Davis
