= The Matador (2008 film) =

- Directed by: Stephen Higgins; Nina Gilden Seavey
- Produced by: Nina Gilden Seavey; Scott Dunklee; Stephen Higgins; Kristie Nova
- Starring: David Fandila; Julio Vázquez (el conta)
- Cinematography: Christopher Jenkins; James Morton-Haworth
- Edited by: Ian Rummer
- Music by: John Califra
- Distributed by: City Lights Pictures
- Release dates: March 10, 2008 (premiere); October 31, 2008 (United States)
- Running time: 74 minutes
- Countries: United States; Peru; Spain
- Languages: English; Spanish

The Matador is a 2008 documentary film about David Fandila's quest to become the world's top-ranked bullfighter. It first premiered at the South by Southwest Film Festival and had since met with mostly positive reviews.

The film follows Fandila's three-year journey into bullfighting history as the violent cultural tradition is questioned.
