= Operation Matador (1975) =

Operation Matador was a Central Intelligence Agency plan in 1975 to utilize the recovery vessel Glomar Explorer to recover the remainder of the Soviet submarine K-129 left on the sea floor by the earlier Project Azorian. The operation was never conducted.

A discussion about the operation was recorded on March 19, 1975 in the Cabinet Room of the White House. President Gerald Ford, Secretary of Defense James R. Schlesinger, Philip Buchen (Counsel to the President), John O. Marsh, Jr. (Counselor to the President), Ambassador Donald Rumsfeld, Lt. General Brent Scowcroft (Deputy Assistant to the President for National Security Affairs), and William Colby (Director of Central Intelligence) discussed the operation and the leak to the press about "Project Jennifer" (as it was then known). During the meeting, the director of CIA, William Colby proposed to keep the operation secret, saying:

I go back to the U-2. I think we should not put the Soviet Union under such pressure to respond.

The result of the meeting was to stonewall, after which the Los Angeles Times published a four-page story the next day by Jack Nelson with the headline, "Administration Won't Talk About Sub Raised by CIA." The document that identified "Operation Matador" as the subject of the cabinet meeting was made public by the National Security Archive (George Washington University) on June 15, 2012.

== See also ==
- Project Azorian
