= Women in Film and Television International =

Global networking organization

- Abbreviation: WIFTI
- Formation: 1997; 29 years ago
- Headquarters: Sandy, Utah, U.S.
- Website: wifti.net

Women in Film & Television International (WIFTI) is a global network of non-profit membership chapters. Established in 1997, it is dedicated to advancing professional development and achievement for women working in all areas of film, video, and other screen-based media.

== Aims ==
- Enhance the international visibility of women in the entertainment industry.
- Facilitate and encourage communication and cooperation internationally.
- Develop bold international projects and initiatives.
- Stimulate professional development and global networking opportunities for women.
- Promote and support chapter development.
- Celebrate the achievements of women in all areas of the industry.
- Encourage diverse and positive representation of women in screen-based media worldwide.

== History ==
Women in Film Los Angeles was founded in 1973 by Tichi Wilkerson Kassel. After several Women in Film organizations were established in a variety of cities around the globe, Women in Film and Television International WIFTI was organized in the mid-1990s.

=== 1973–1997 ===
Women in Film and Television International (WIFTI) is a "global network comprised of over forty Women in Film chapters worldwide with over 10,000 members, dedicated to advancing professional development and achievement for women working in all areas of film, video and digital media." The organization was founded in 1973 in Los Angeles by Tichi Wilkerson Kassel and grew quickly worldwide, hosting their first Women in Film and Television International World Summit in New York City in September 1997.

== WIFTI chapters ==
Main sources:

Region		Chapter	Yr.fo.	Yr.ch	President	Web
Africa		WIFT South Africa		2005		
Asia		WIFTAI India				
Australia^{[4]}		WIFT NSW	1982			
Australia^{[4]}	Australia	WIFT Victoria	1988		Lauren Simpson	^{[5]}
Australia^{[4]}	Australia	WIFT WA	2016			
Australia^{[4]}		WIFT Australia	2018		Liz Tomkins (chair of national board)	
Australia^{[4]}		WIFT South Australia	2018			
Australia^{[4]}	Australia	WIFT Tasmania	2018			
Australia^{[4]}	Australia	WIFT Queensland	2020			
Pacific Islands	New Zealand	WIFT NZ	1993		Vicki Jackways	^{[3a]}
Europe		WIFT Finland		2014	Elina Knihtilä	
Europe		WFTV United Kingdom	1989	1990	Liz Tucker	^{[2a]}
Europe		WIFT Ireland				—
Europe	Ireland	WIFTM Italy	2018			
Europe		WIFT Germany				
Europe		WIF France				
Europe		WIF Sweden	2003	2005		
Europe		WIFT Greece	1973		Olympia Mytilinaiou	
WIF Czech Republic						
South America		WIFT Brazil				
Latin American & Caribbean		Dominican Republic				
Latin American & Caribbean		WIFT (Mexico)		2002	Concepción Tabaoada	
Canada		WIFT Alberta			Kathy Fedori	
Canada	Canada	WIFT Atlantic	-	2009	Kimberlee McTaggart	
Canada	Canada	WIFT Montreal	1991		Brigitte Monneau	
Canada	Canada	WIFT Toronto	1984		Karen Bruce	
Canada	Canada	WIFTV Vancouver	1989		Sarah Kalil (2017-19)	
United States		WIFT Atlanta			LaRonda Sutton	
United States	United States	WIFT San Francisco	2001	2003	Soumyaa Kapil Behrens	
United States	United States	WIF Chicago			Carrie Hunter	
United States	United States	WIF Dallas		1984	Alicia Pascual	
United States	United States	WIFM Kansas City			Laurie Crawford (2017 19)	
United States	United States	WIF Los Angeles	1977	1997		^{[1a]}
United States	United States	WIF Las Vegas	2002	2004	Phyllis Cesare-Taie (Founder)	
United States	United States	MNWIFT (Minnesota)		2012?	Joanne Liebeler (2016-17)	
United States	United States	WIFT Nashville			Lynda Evjen	
United States	United States	WIFV New England	1981	2005?		
United States	United States	NMWIF Santa Fe			Christine McHugh	
United States	United States	NYWIFT New York	1977		Simone Pero (2017-18)	
United States	United States	WIF & Media Pittsburgh		2007	Roxana Gilani	
United States	United States	WIF-PDX Portland			Lisa Miyamoto	
United States	United States	WIF Seattle			Lisa B. Hammond	
United States	United States	WIFV Washington D.C.	1979		Carletta S Hurt	^{[1b]}
United States	United States	Women in Film Utah		2010	Susan McEvoy (2017- )	
United States	United States	WIFM Tennessee			Roxanna 'Roxie" Green	
United States	United States	WIFT Palm Springs	2001	2010		
United States	United States	WIFT Florida			Nancy McBride	
United States	United States	WIFT Louisiana			Carol Bidault de l'Isle	
United States	United States	WIFT Maryland				—
United States	United States	WIFT Houston				

Notes

1. ^{1a} WIF Los Angeles — Official Website: WomenInFilm.org

— see also, Women in Film Crystal + Lucy Awards

... ^{1b} WIFV Washington D.C. — Women in Film & Video-DC Women of Vision Awards

— The founders include Ginny Durrin, Judy Herbert, Sharon Ferguson, Christine Brim, Jan Hatcher, Norma Davidoff, Pat McMurray, Catherine Anderson, Lauren Versel, Michal Carr, Elise Reeder, and Polly Krieger.

2. ^{2a} WFTV United Kingdom — Official Website: WFTV UK

— The founders include Lynda La Plante, Norma Heyman, Jenne Casarroto, Dawn French, Joan Collins and Janet Street-Porter.

3. ^{3a} WIFT NZ — Official Website: WIFT NZ

History of WIFT in NZ, researched and written by Helen Martin, traces the history of Women in Film and Television, from the establishment of WIF in Los Angeles in 1973, through the founding of WIFT Wellington in 1994, to the 10th anniversary of WIFT Auckland in 2005.

4. ^{4} As of May 2022, WIFT VIC and WIFT WA were operating as individual organisations, while WIFT NSW was in the process of transitioning up into WIFT Australia.

5. ^{5} See also Women Applying to Film School, an initiative run from 1989 and co-sponsored by WIFT Victoria in 1990.

== Programs ==
- Women in Film-LA presents annual awards at their Women in Film Crystal + Lucy Awards ceremonies. In 1988, they presented the Lillian Gish Award for excellence in episodic directing.
- Women in Film Foundation's Film Finishing Fund supports films by, for or about women. — since 2004
- There are 22 affiliate organizations of WIFTI in the United States. The Washington D.C. affiliate, Women in Film & Video, has presented Women of Vision awards annually since 1994 to honor creative and technical achievements of women in media. Women in Film & Video has held a WIFV annual film festival.
- Women In Film & Television Short Film Showcase, or WIFTI Short-Case, is a demonstration of WIFTI members' creativity, vision, and artistry. — since 2004
- WIFTI Summits have been held bi-annually. — since 1997

== See also ==
- Women in Film Crystal + Lucy Awards
- Women in Film & Video-DC Women of Vision Awards
- New York Women in Film & Television
- Women in Film and Television (South Africa)
- UK Women in Film and Television Awards
- Women in Film and Television New Zealand Awards

Related organizations

- Women in film
- International Association of Women in Radio and Television
- ReFrame
