= Bill Cushenbery =

American car designer and builder (1933–1998)

- Born: March 22, 1933; Wichita, Kansas
- Died: December 12, 1998 (aged 65); Kern City, California
- Occupations: Car builder and customizer, model kit designer
- Notable work: Silhouette (1962); Car Craft Dream Rod (1963); Batmobile (1966)

Bill Cushenbery (March 22, 1933 – December 12, 1998) was an American car customizer, show car builder, and model kit designer. Cushenbery was a major influence on the look of custom cars and the customizing industry in general. In addition to building his own designs, he is noted for having helped George Barris create the Batmobile car featured in the 1966–1968 Batman television series.

== History ==
Cushenbery worked in autobody repair shops to learn to do bodywork. Several members of his family were already in the trade and helped train him, but Cushenbery wanted to build new instead of repair damage.

Cushenbery started customizing cars in 1947, in a small shop set up in the back of his parents' house behind a service station in Wichita, Kansas. His first custom was a 1948 Frazer coupe.

Cushenbery soon established his own business called the Kansas Kustom Shop. At first, his body shop did work paid for by insurance companies, as well as some mild custom work. At the same time Darryl Starbird's Star Kustom Shop was also in Wichita.

After visiting California, Cushenbery returned to Wichita just long enough to get married, and then relocated to Monterey, California in 1954. He worked at a Cadillac dealership for about one year, while also picking up work from a local car club.

In the early 1960s, model car maker AMT created the Custom Car Caravan. AMT Vice President George Toteff and AMT Representative Budd Anderson worked with George Barris to create the Caravan as a way to promote car culture and AMT products in particular. Shortly after that first Caravan, Jacques Passino, the director of Ford’s Special Products Division, became involved and rebranded the show as the Ford Custom Car Caravan for 1963. While the first Ford Caravan focused mainly on cars developed by the company in house, in subsequent years many independent customizers were included, with Cushenbery being among the first invited to develop a car for the show.

Cushenbery's ties to AMT extended to developing model kits of his designs for sale.

In 1965, Cushenbery relocated his shop to Burbank, California, just blocks from Barris' North Hollywood location. During his time there, he incorporated his business to raise money to finish some projects, but wound up losing control of the shop to his other partners and walking away from Burbank. He opened a new shop in Bakersfield in 1974.

By 1966, the public had lost its taste for radical customs, so Cushenbery turned his attention to restoration work and to repairs for high-end imports. He customized a number of Porsches, and a De Tomaso Pantera. He worked on Frank Sinatra's Dual-Ghia and worked with Steve McQueen on the cars for the Le Mans film, developing camera mounts and specialized body panels. He became well known as a restorer of Mercedes-Benz 300 SLs.

== Show cars and noteworthy customs ==
=== El Matador ===
In late 1959, Cushenbery began work on his first show car, El Matador, as a rolling advertisement. Although often mistaken for a 1940 Ford, El Matador started life as a 1939 model and debuted in February 1961 at the Oakland Roadster Show.

During the period when Cushenbery was tied to Ford, the original 303 cu in (5.0 L) Oldsmobile Rocket V8 was replaced with a Ford engine.

=== Les Popo ===
Cushenbery was just one of the customizers involved in building this 1940 Ford Coupe for Bob Crespo. Completed in the late 1950s, the coupe's body was sectioned by Hal Hutchins, with some additional restyling done by Cushenbery. Barris built the hood, frenched in the grille, and installed the canted quad headlamps.

=== Exodus ===
Exodus was a 1959 Chevrolet Impala that Cushenbery built for Tony Cardoza. Every body panel on this car was altered in some way, setting a new trend in customizing.

Exodus was completed in 1961 and shown at the 1961 Monterey Kar Kapades.

=== Limelighter ===
Limelighter was a 1958 Impala built by Cushenbery in 1964 for Frank Gould of Hollister, California. The car's front and rear were extensively reshaped, and the pan was rolled. Inside, the stock dashboard was replaced by a section of wing strut and two instrument pods from a 1950s era Nash, and a custom console was added.

Bud Millard acquired the car in 1998 and made plans for the original builder to restore the car himself, but Cushenbery died before he could start. Limelighter was then sent to OZ Kustoms, who restored the car and made other changes, including chopping an additional 2 in (51 mm) out of the roof height and replacing the engine and transmission with a 1996 vintage 350 cu in (5.7 L) Chevrolet small-block engine and a 700R automatic transmission.

=== Silhouette ===
In 1962, Cushenbery collaborated with artist Don Varner to create Silhouette, his first show car not based on a production body. Starting with a shortened 1956 Buick chassis, he hand-hammered the body from 20 gauge steel and topped it with a front-hinged bubble canopy supplied by Acry Plastics. Originally, power came from a Buick Nailhead V8 that was later fitted with Hilborn fuel injection. By the time the car appeared in Ford's Custom Car Caravan, the Buick engine had been swapped out for a 427 cu in (7.0 L) Ford FE engine.

Silhouette made extensive use of electric controls on the dash or hidden in the car's trim for things like raising and lowering the bubble top, opening the hood and trunk, starting the engine, the lights, and running the blower fans.

Silhouette debuted at the 1963 Oakland Roadster Show and won the Tournament of Frame, earning Cushenbery his first Master Builder Award and a trip to Paris, France.

Silhouette was mistakenly sold to a bodyshop in North Hollywood, then later bought by a friend of Cushenbery's who had plans to restore it. The partially disassembled car was on a trailer when the car and trailer together were stolen.

=== Car Craft Dream Rod ===
By the early 1960s, the supply of original Model T, Model A, and '32 Fords that Hot Rodders had traditionally based their street rods on was dwindling. In their October 1961 issue, Car Craft magazine published an article that suggested how the hobby and the cars could adapt to the changing times. In 1963, Rob Larivee, of Promotions Inc., contracted Cushenbery to build a car based on the suggestions in that article. Larivee retained ownership of the car, but allowed Car Craft to use their name on it.

The car was built on a Jowett Jupiter chassis. Front suspension was a transverse torsion leaf and trailing arm system from a Volkswagen Beetle. Powering the car was a 289 cu in (4.7 L) Ford Windsor V8. Body panels came from a variety of sources, using doors and front fenders from a 1960 Pontiac, upper rear quarter panels from a 1960 Chevrolet Corvair, a windshield and roof from a 1953 Studebaker, and a rear window from a 1957 Borgward Isabella sedan. The car's body style was strikingly asymmetric. Like Silhouette, the Dream Rod made extensive use of electric assists, but went one step further by adding a remote radio control panel to operate the accessories.

The Car Craft Dream Rod was completed in 1963.

AMT issued a 1/25 scale model of the Dream Rod.

In 1966, the Dream Rod was sold to the International Show Car Association (ISCA), who commissioned a restyling of the car and renamed the result the Tiger Shark. Among the changes made were the addition of a hood scoop, closing of the roof scoops, lengthening the rear by 6 in (152 mm), and elimination of the trunk lid. Tiger Shark was itself the basis for a 1/25 scale model, this time issued by MPC. A 1/64 scale Hot Wheels version was issued that was named the Cheetah during development, but this was changed to Python after the first few were produced.

In 2005 Mark Moriarity bought the car from its owner in Milwaukee and began to methodically undo the changes that had been made to convert it into Tiger Shark, restoring the car to its original Car Craft Dream Rod configuration.

=== Silhouette II Space Coupe ===
Cushenbery started work on another bubble car, originally called the Scorpion, in 1963. He later changed the name to Silhouette II Space Coupe.

Major components for the car were sourced from a 1961 or 1962 Corvair, including the air-cooled Chevrolet Turbo-Air 6 engine, transmission, and front and rear suspension. The engine was later upgraded to a 1965 model displacing 164 cu in (2.7 L) and producing 140 hp (104.4 kW). Cushenbery built a custom chassis with a dropped center section. The body was formed in 0.050 in (1 mm) half-hard aluminum.

Work had started on the car in Cushenbery's Monterey shop, and the unfinished car had moved with him to Burbank. When Cushenbery lost control of that shop, he took some critical parts of the car with him but lost track of the rest, and the car essentially vanished.

Silhouette II Space Coupe was rediscovered on 30 April, 1999, by Carl Green. It was put on temporary display at Darryl Starbird's Rod and Custom Hall of Fame Museum prior to the start of its full restoration. Original blueprints for the car were found at the home of Cushenbery's daughter. Work on the car did not start in earnest until 2007, when in December of that year a new bubble top was blown for the car. Bodywork for the car was to be handled by Willie Newman from New Zealand and interior work by "Little John" Englehardt, while a period-correct powertrain was built by Jeff Williams of California Corvairs.

=== Marquis ===
In 1963, Cushenbery began work on Marquis for Gene Boucher, a project which took two and a half years to complete. The car incorporated an asymmetric body line in the raised peak down the hood. Paint was done by Don Mathews and the Naugahyde interior by Bill Manger.

=== The Astro ===
The Astro was a customized 1963 Ford Galaxie that Cushenbery designed and built for the Ford Custom Car Caravan. Cushenbery started with a convertible body, and added a landau half-roof covered in white vinyl and a removable center panel. He also replicated the Ford's jet-inspired round taillamp treatment on the front of the car, stacking dual Lucas headlamps in circular surrounds with a horizontal dividing bar on each side. The grille was blacked out except for a single horizontal bar with the Ford emblem in the middle.

=== The Batmobile ===
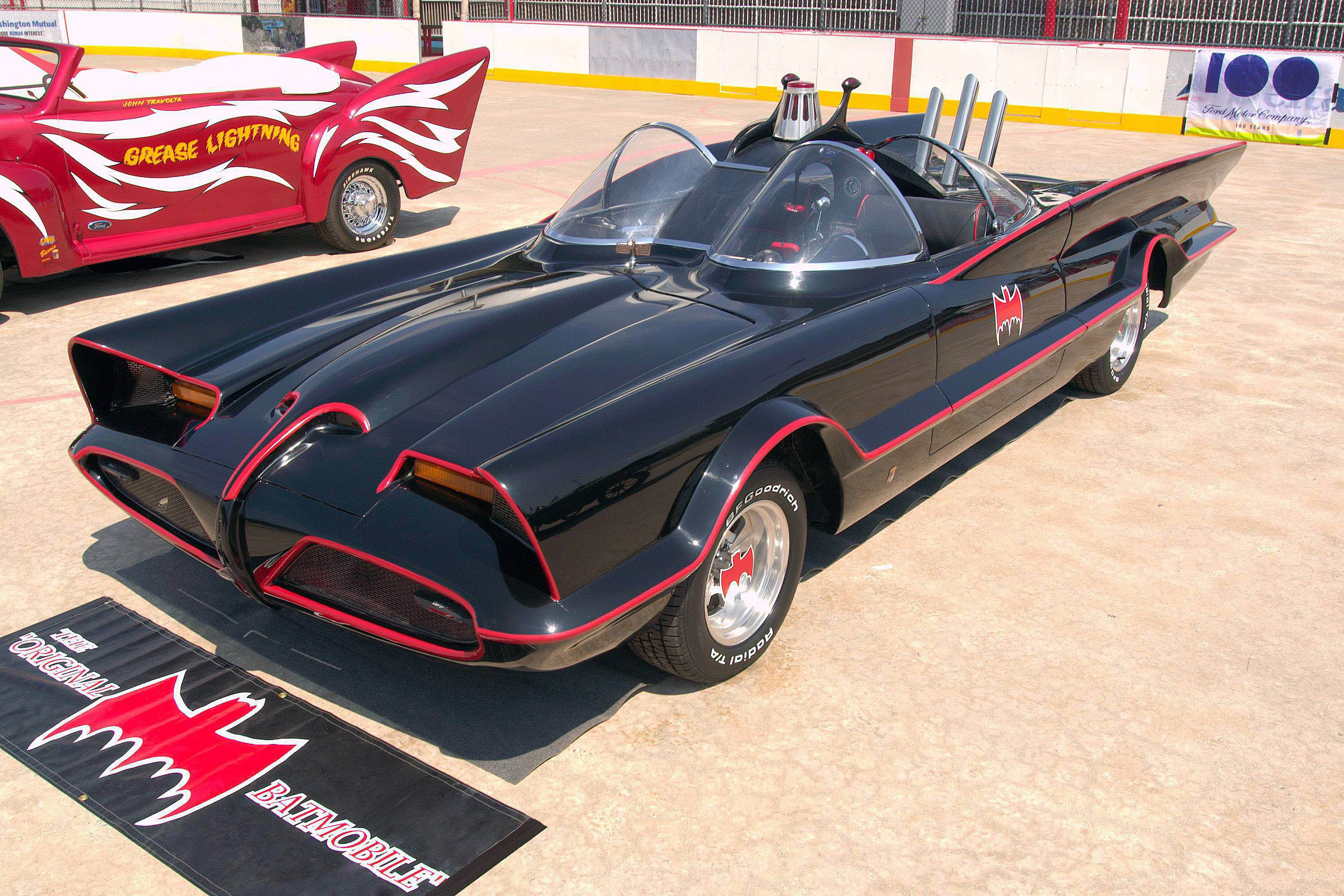
The Batmobile in 2003

In October 1965, Barris hired Cushenbery to do the metalwork that would turn the Lincoln Futura concept car into the Batmobile car featured in the 1960s Batman television series. The original contract specified a list of modifications required by the studio. The conversion was completed in three weeks at a cost of US$30,000. The Batmobile appeared in a network presentation reel, then was leased to 20th Century Fox Television and Greenway Productions for the series.

=== The Gypsy ===
Cushenbery designed a dune buggy called The Gypsy. Departing from traditional dune buggy styling, The Gypsy was a sportier, more street-oriented design with an all-aluminum body and an engine from a Porsche 912. It did not appear on the show car circuit, but was the basis for a model kit from Revell. Cushenbery kept The Gypsy himself, intending to put fiberglass replicas into production, but never did.

=== Surfin' Bird ===
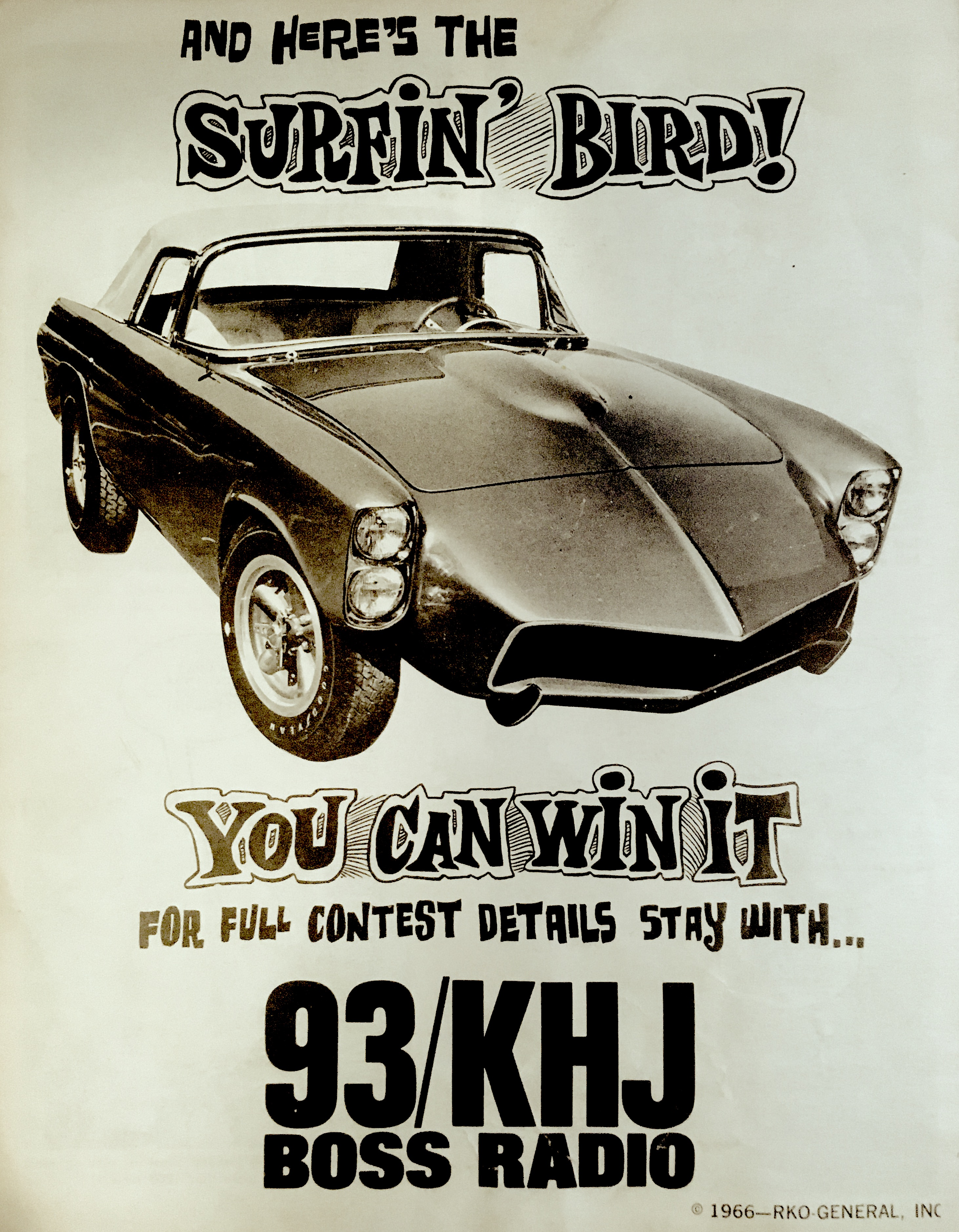

One of the last custom cars done by Cushenbery was Surfin' Bird; a modified 1956 Ford Thunderbird given away by 93/KHJ Boss Radio as part of the station's 'Summer of the Big Kahuna' promotion.

Cushenbery was contracted to build Surfin' Bird with a budget of $5,000 and a tight completion deadline. Boss radio ran multiple promotional spots for the contest, several of which include background grinder noise to simulate being in a working body shop while the "Big Kahuna", as portrayed by Chris Varez, asks Cushenbery to add features to the car. These may be the only known audio recordings of Bill Cushenbery's voice.

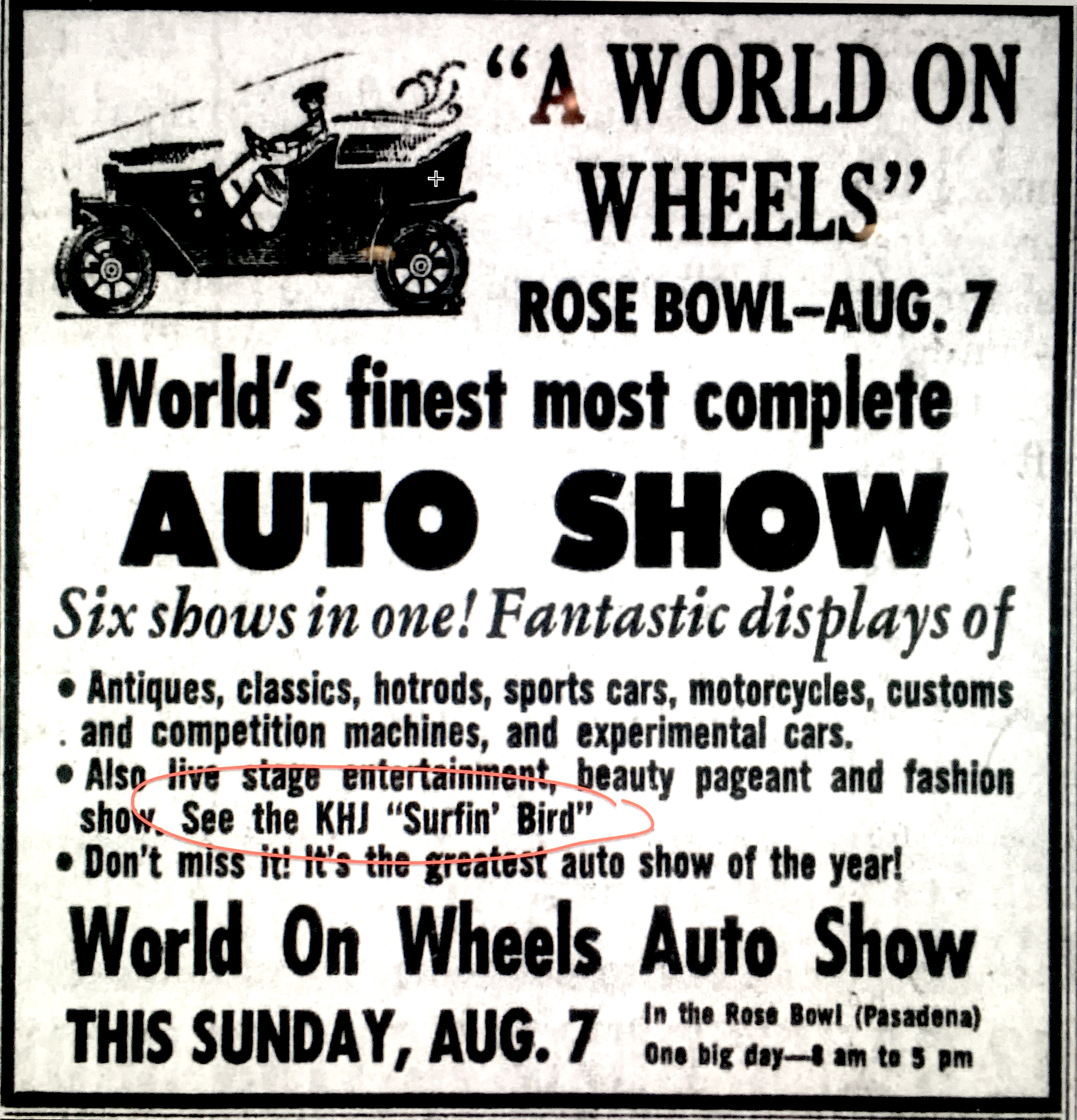

Surfin' Bird was displayed at "A World On Wheels", an auto show held at the Rose Bowl in Pasadena, on 7 August 1966, and was given away one day later on 8 August on KHJ-TV.

== Personal life ==
Bill married Anna Loretta Head in 1953, and had one daughter in 1954.

Bill was later married to Tanis Cushenbery (nee McAllister). They had two children.

Away from cars and customizing, he built and flew F1B rubber-powered free flight model aircraft.
