= Anna María Arías =

American journalist and entrepreneur

Anna María Arías (July 12, 1960 – October 1, 2001) was an American journalist and entrepreneur of Hispanic descent. She founded Latina Style magazine also serving as the magazine's editor.

== Career ==
The daughter of Jesse Arias and Rita Arias, she was born in San Bernardino and studied at San Diego State University, going on to earn a BA in communications from Hawaii Pacific University. She received a Congressional Hispanic Caucus fellowship and joined the production team for CNN's Crossfire series. Arias was managing editor for Hispanic magazine for five years. She started Latina Style magazine in 1994. Five years later, the magazine was named Outstanding English or Bilingual Magazine by the National Association of Hispanic Publications. In the same year, Arias was named Entrepreneur of the Year by the Greater Washington Hispanic Chamber of Commerce.

She was founder and president of Arias Communications. Arias also worked for the Democratic National Committee as a media and campaign organizer for presidential and local candidates.

She died at the University of Texas MD Anderson Cancer Center from complications related to a bone marrow transplant to treat aplastic anemia.

The Anna Maria Arias Foundation was created in 2002 to recognize Latina entrepreneurs. The Mexican-American Women's National Association (MANA) offers the Ana Maria Arias Scholarship to Hispanic women attending colleges in the United States.
