= Ann Mikolowski =

American 20th-century contemporary artist

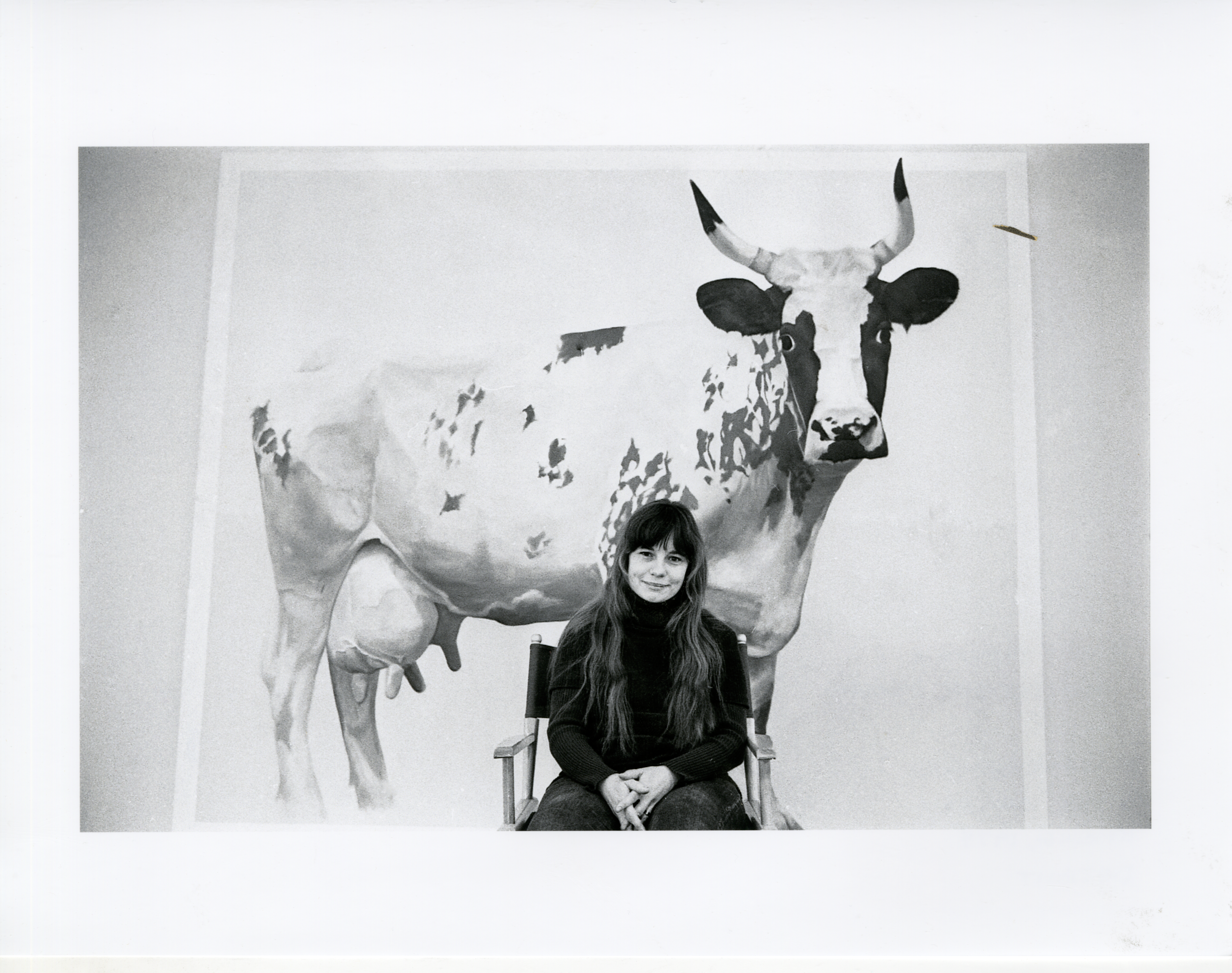
- Mikolowski with her painting, Stella
- Born: Ann Stroman; May 16, 1940; Detroit, Michigan
- Died: August 6, 1999 (aged 59); Ann Arbor, Michigan
- Resting place: Forest Hill Cemetery
- Education: Wayne State University; College of Creative Studies
- Known for: Painting, printmaking, portraits, marine art, book illustration, illustration
- Notable work: Stella, Robert Creeley, Aris Koutroulis, Bei Dao, Horizon, Ghost Rider
- Movement: Cass Corridor; Contemporary realism
- Spouse: Ken Mikolowski
- Patrons: Gilbert and Lila Silverman, James Duffy

Ann Margaret (Stroman) Mikolowski (May 16, 1940 – August 6, 1999) was a twentieth-century American contemporary artist. She was a painter of portrait miniatures and waterscapes, as well as a printmaker and illustrator of printed matter (small press, commercial). Mikolowski was part of Detroit's Cass Corridor artist movement and co-founder of The Alternative Press.

== Early life and education ==
Ann Mikolowski was born in Detroit, Michigan. The child of Addison and Frances Stroman, Ann lived on Detroit's East Side, near Gratiot Avenue, with brother Mark. Ann's father was a draftsman who became the head of Chrysler Missile's drafting department. After high school (Cass Technical High School, Marine City High School), Ann worked for a short time at Chrysler as a layout artist, taking night classes in art at Wayne State University and the College of Creative Studies. Her teachers included painter Robert Wilbert as well as Detroit Lithography Workshop printmakers Theo Wujick and Aris Koutroulis.

Ann and Ken Mikolowski had met as high-school students in Marine City (class of 1958); they married in 1961. The couple became residents of the Jeffries Housing Projects while both attended Wayne State, Ann studying art and Ken literature. In 1966, the Mikolowskis relocated to the Woodbridge neighborhood, renting on Commonwealth St. before purchasing a home in 1967, just after the 1967 Detroit Uprising.

"I didn't have a big background in art history," Ann Mikolowski said in 1998, "in fact, a great deal of my inspiration came from poets." Formative influences include Georgia O'Keeffe and Jan van Eyck's St. Jerome in his Study (Mikolowski's favorite painting at the Detroit Institute of Arts). In a diary, Mikolowski wrote: “Everything I feel about Detroit goes into my big water paintings."

Detroit’s Cass Corridor artists found a first, informal salon around Ken and Ann's kitchen table in their Avery St. home. In 1969, the Mikolowski basement became a pressroom, which afterwards moved with the family (children Michael and Molly, dog Inky) from Detroit to Grindstone City in 1974, then from Grindstone City to Ann Arbor in 1993–94.

== The Alternative Press, 1969–99 ==
Both Ann and Ken Mikolowski were influenced by mixed-media and multimedia art practices, like their contemporaries (many close friends and contributors to The Alternative Press) in the Cass Corridor, Beats, New York School, Black Mountain College, and Bolinas creative communities." Ann's art developed with, and contributed to, the creative philosophy of The Alternative Press. Publication criteria for poetry and art was, according to Ken, about instant engagement: “We’re not interested in obscure poetry. We want a sense of immediacy, a transference of energy from writer to reader. Painting and music and poetry, they all produce a spark. And people are surprised when it does hit them." About printing poems on a jobbing press, Ken said, "I like the idea of poetry being functional, as postcards or billboards."

Ann and Ken began printing in 1969, with a Chandler & Price platen press (8" x 12") purchased from the Detroit Artist's Workshop. They built up and maintained the studio together — at its largest in Grindstone City, the studio included two Chandler & Price presses and a lithographic press. Both Ken and Ann composed and imposed type; both printed proofs. Both chose literary content, paper, and ink. Ann, as artist, created woodcut, linoleum, wood-engraved, and etched ornaments to accompany poems selected for publication. Ken printed issue runs and editions, because of the C&P's high-speed motor.

Most of Ann's tools and dies for her printmaking are archived as part of The Alternative Press letterpress studio (now the University of Michigan Library book-arts studio). Type is also preserved at Naropa University's Harry Smith Print Shop. Ann's illustration work for The Alternative Press make her its most-often published contributor. At present, 115 items listed in WorldCat document Ann's contributions to Alternative Press material, along with illustrations and cover art for other publications. Illustrations also appeared in the Detroit Free Press and The Detroit News.

== Subjects, technique, style, media ==
A 1974 Willis Gallery group show included "Ann Mikolowski's life-size, photoreal rendering of a cow [Stella] flanked by, of all things, miniature paintings." John Yau notes: "Scale plays a crucial role in Mikolowski’s landscapes and portraits. The land- and waterscapes can be as large as six by seven and a half feet, while the portraits are seldom taller or wider than three inches, and fit easily in the palm of one’s hand. They are literal mementoes that one can carry anywhere."

Mikolowski's work explores postwar art, superrealism, and contemporary realism. In Mikolowski's work, paint and ink challenge photography's claims on representing experience. Yau on the portraits: "Despite working from color snapshots, she has avoided the quality of detachment that we usually associate with Photo-Realism. Her paintings quietly assert what they are — oil on canvas, on homemade stretchers, framed with thin wood slats." Observations are hers: "'I always work from my own photos, 'cause there it's like a sketchbook. If I try to work from photos that people give me, I don't have any connection with a live person.'" Her process included "combining the background from one photo with a figure from another."

Mikolowski draws attention to scale not only as a play of small against large, but as studies of how objects impact consciousness in ordinary life: the outdoors, animals, Adirondack chairs, electrical poles, food, technology. Mikolowski's repurposing of representational technique aligns with Marsha Miro's observation about Cass Corridor artists generally: "The Detroit artists did it in a totally new way because they came out of abstraction...they didn't come out of it like Picasso, through Impressionism."

Mikolowski worked in oils on linen, watercolor, pen and ink, pastel, pencil sketches, and printmaking (silkscreen, lithography, linocut, wood engraving, drypoint, intaglio and relief printing). For text illustration and printmaking, Mikolowski's techniques included intensive repetitive use of stipple and line, with attention to the impact of layers of impression and paper texture. Art critic Natalie Haddad, on the portraits: "Mikolowski’s process was rigorous. To achieve an almost photorealist accuracy on the tiny canvases, she worked with modified brushes, pared down sometimes to a few bristles."

== Later life ==
In 1974, the Mikolowskis relocated to Grindstone City Michigan, which was in walking distance to Lake Huron. Ken: "We came specifically because of the building." They made an 1884 grindstone-wall structure (built by town founder Captain Aaron Peer) into a home with a 28' x 50' studio for painting and printing. Ann painted, illustrated, printed, tended an extensive garden which fed the family, and taught as a high-school artist in residence. The waterscapes developed from "small watercolors and drawings" of Lake Huron: "we moved there in '74 and it took me until about '85 before I started painting big paintings of the lake." The miniature portraits were also begun around 1974: "just before we left Detroit...I started doing portraits of people I really cared about. I wanted them to be intimate because I could carry them with me in my pocket, supposedly, that was the idea. I did them for my own pleasure, really."

Ann began showing work at the Detroit Institute of Arts in 1980. In 1983, Mikolowski's miniature portraits were exhibited at solo shows, a collaboration with Detroit's Feigenson Gallery and New York City's Gotham Book Mart. Her waterscapes were exhibited as part of a solo show by the Feigenson Gallery in 1986, the same year her work was included in an Allan Stone Gallery group show in New York. In 1988, "Portraits of Poets" was shown at San Francisco's Intersection for the Arts experimental gallery space. Also, Ann and Ken moved to Ann Arbor. Ken had accepted a full-time poetry lecturer position at the University of Michigan's Residential College. Ann needed nine-months' treatment for just-diagnosed breast cancer (surgery and chemotherapy), which was by all indications successful. The Ann Arbor home and studio were on Henry Street (Lower Burns Park). Through the 1990s, Ann's work was being shown almost yearly (solo and group exhibitions).

In 1997, complications from breast cancer reemerged. Ann Mikolowski continued painting and illustrating until her death, choosing anthroposophic treatment over other medical options to maintain quality of life: "Love and compassion...those issues are what begin to be really clear and to stick...that that's the most important thing about life — a lot of other things can fall away — and art is important too."

== Selected institutional collections ==
- National Portrait Gallery, Smithsonian
- Detroit Institute of Arts
- State of Michigan
- University of Michigan Library
- University of Michigan Museum of Art
- Wayne State University
- Wayne State University Library

== Selected accomplishments ==
- Michigan Absolut Vodka artist, "Absolut Statehood" series, painting commission, 1992.
- Michigan Council for the Arts Individual Artist Grant, 1990, 1983.
- Michigan Arts Award, Arts Foundation of Michigan, 1982.
- Alumni Arts Achievement Award/Wayne State University Michigan Arts Award, Arts Foundation of Michigan, 1982.
- Silver Medal, Scarab Club, 1977.
- National Endowment for the Arts Small Press Grant, 1975.
- Artist-in-residence: Jack Kerouac School of Disembodied Poetics (Naropa Institute, 1995), Big Sky Project (Port Austin MI, 1987).
- Michigan artist-in-the-schools programs: Whitmore Lake Schools 1993–94, Michigan Council for the Arts (Howe School 1992–93, Phoenix High School 1992, Pinckney Schools 1990, North Huron School 1985–88).
