= History of Chinese Americans in Metro Detroit =

Ethnic Chinese and Chinese American people comprise one of the major Asian-origin ethnic groups in the Wayne–Macomb–Oakland tri-county area in Metro Detroit. Troy, Rochester Hills, Madison Heights and Canton Township are hubs of Chinese residents in the metropolitan area.

As of 2022, there are 21,000 ethnic Chinese in Oakland County, 5,200 in Wayne County, 2,500 in Macomb County. Chinese make up nearly two percent of Oakland County's population. The other counties' Chinese populations make up only 0.3-0.5% of their populations.

In the Greater Metro Detroit area, college town Ann Arbor also hosts an abundant Chinese community.

Within the city of Detroit, the area north of Downtown Detroit, including the region around the Henry Ford Hospital, the Detroit Medical Center, and Wayne State University, has transient Asian national origin residents who are university students or hospital workers; most of these Asians are Chinese and Indians. Few of them have permanent residency after schooling ends.

There are no Chinatowns in the Detroit area; the last one was losing its Chinese population and businesses, and was renovated with complete change by the mid-20th century. The largest still-operating Chinatown in proximity to Metro Detroit is located in the Chinatown of Windsor, Ontario, Canada.

== History ==
Ah Chee, the first known Chinese person in Detroit, arrived in 1872 and established a laundry business. The first Chinese businesses were established in Metro Detroit in 1879, making the Chinese the Asian immigrant group with the longest history in the city. Many Chinese started coming to Detroit after Ah Chee established laundry businesses. At one time Detroit had its own Chinatown. In 1892, several immigrants to Detroit were sentenced to hard labor for illegally entering the country but, in Wong Wing v. United States, the U.S. Supreme Court ruled that a jury trial was needed for such a punishment.

During the period of Chinese Exclusion, many Chinese immigrants chose to enter the United States extra-legally. This was frequently done by taking the Canadian Pacific Railroad from Vancouver, British Columbia to Windsor, Ontario. From there immigrants could attempt to cross the Detroit river into the United States after contracting with smuggling organizations in the area. These crossings were often perilous, with numerous fatalities being reported during the time.

In 1905 the first Chinese restaurant opened in Detroit. In the early 20th century Henry Ford recruited ethnic Chinese living in Hawaii to work at his automobile plants. In the 1920s Detroit had 300 Chinese laundry businesses and 12 Chinese restaurants. Helen Zia, author of Asian American Dreams: The Emergence of an American People, wrote that the Chinese business community in Detroit had its peak in the 1920s.

More Chinese people moved to Detroit in the 1930s, but the Chinese business and the population of Detroit's Chinatown had begun to decline after the 1920s. Much of the Chinatown was demolished in the 1950s so the John C. Lodge Freeway could be built. As a result, Chinatown moved to an area in the southern Cass Corridor focused on the intersection of Cass Avenue and Peterboro Street. In 1951 about 2,000 Chinese lived in the Detroit city limits.

The more highly educated ethnic Chinese who moved to Detroit after the Immigration Act of 1965 moved to Detroit's suburbs, bypassing Detroit itself and its Chinatown. The previous generation of established laundry and restaurant owners had children who, instead of staying in the Chinatown area, tended to move outward to the suburbs of Metro Detroit, or to other cities for work and educational opportunities.

Chinese American architect and engineer Marvin Chin opened the landmark tiki-themed restaurant nightclub Chin Tiki in 1967.

The 1980 United States census counted 1,213 ethnic Chinese in the City of Detroit. Zia wrote that the figure was "surely an undercount" but that the Chinese population in the City of Detroit "was unquestionably small." The presence of family-owned businesses in the Detroit Chinatown area had declined by the 1980s. Zia wrote that by that decade, the "shrinking base" in the Detroit Chinatown "reflected the diminished role of the merchants."

In 1982, in Metro Detroit autoworkers killed Vincent Chin, a Chinese American mistaken for a Japanese American. An October 27, 2009 article by the Detroit Free Press stated that "It took the slaying of[...] Vincent Chin by a disgruntled autoworker in 1982 to awaken Detroit of the ugliness and danger of anti-Asian racism." Cynthia Lee, a Chinese American from Hawaii who worked as a reporter for The Detroit News, interviewed Metro Detroit Chinese Americans who criticized the verdict given to the two men, who pleaded guilty and received probation and fines. The Chinese Americans interviewed by Lee stated that the sentences were too light.

== Cultural institutions ==
The Association of Chinese Americans (ACA, traditional Chinese: 美華協會; simplified Chinese: 美华协会; pinyin: Měihuá Xiéhuì) is the Detroit chapter of the OCA - Asian Pacific American Advocates. In the fall of 1971 Dr. Andrew Yang invited a group of Chinese Americans in Metro Detroit to hear K.L. Wang's presentation that advocated for the establishment of a national Chinese-American association. The members of the ACA held its first meeting in 1971 in order to establish the organization. The organization was founded in 1972.

The Chinese Community Center (CCC, 美華協會華人中心; 美华协会华人中心; Měihuá Xiéhuì Huárén Zhōngxīn) of the ACA is located in Madison Heights. The center opened on August 8, 2005.

Historically, the Chinese Welfare Council and the On Leong Merchants Association served members of Detroit's Chinese community. In Detroit the On Leong had social functions. The Detroit Chinese Welfare Council attended political functions and represented the interests of Chinatown to the city government.

Rising Voices

== Education ==
The American Chinese School at Greater Detroit (ACSGD, 底特律中文学校; 底特律中文學校; Dǐtèlǜ Zhōngwén Xuéxiào), a supplementary Chinese school, is located in Birmingham. The first school year was 1972–1973. Other supplementary Chinese schools in Metro Detroit include the Canton Plymouth Chinese Learning Center (凯通中文学校; 凱通中文學校; Kǎitōng Zhōngwén Xuéxiào) in Canton, founded in September 1996; and the Michigan New Century Chinese School (新世纪中文学校; 新世紀中文學校; Xīnshìjì Zhōngwén Xuéxiào) in Livonia, founded in January 2000.

== Healthcare and elderly services ==
The Association of Chinese Americans operated a Chinatown clinic in the Cass Corridor Chinatown from September 9, 1973 until 1996. The Detroit Drop-In Center, a center providing services to older Chinese Americans in the Cass Chinatown, opened in October 1990. In 2005 its operations in the Canton and Plymouth areas opened. In January 2011 the main center moved to a new location in the Hannan House along Woodward Avenue.

== Notable people ==
- Grace Lee Boggs
- Curtis Chin author, activist, founder of the Asian American Writers Workshop
- Vincent Chin (automotive draftsman, murdered by a racially motivated attack that sparked national civil rights movement by Asian Americans)
- Mei Lin (chef) - Dearborn
- Anita Lo (restaurateur) - Birmingham
- Anna Sui fashion designer
- Frances Kai-Hwa Wang journalist, author

== See also ==
- Demographics of Metro Detroit
- American Revolutionary: The Evolution of Grace Lee Boggs
- History of the Japanese in Metro Detroit
- Wong Wing v. United States
