= Cass Corridor =

Neighborhood of Detroit, Michigan

Cass Corridor, Detroit
- Neighborhood of Detroit
- Cass Corridor
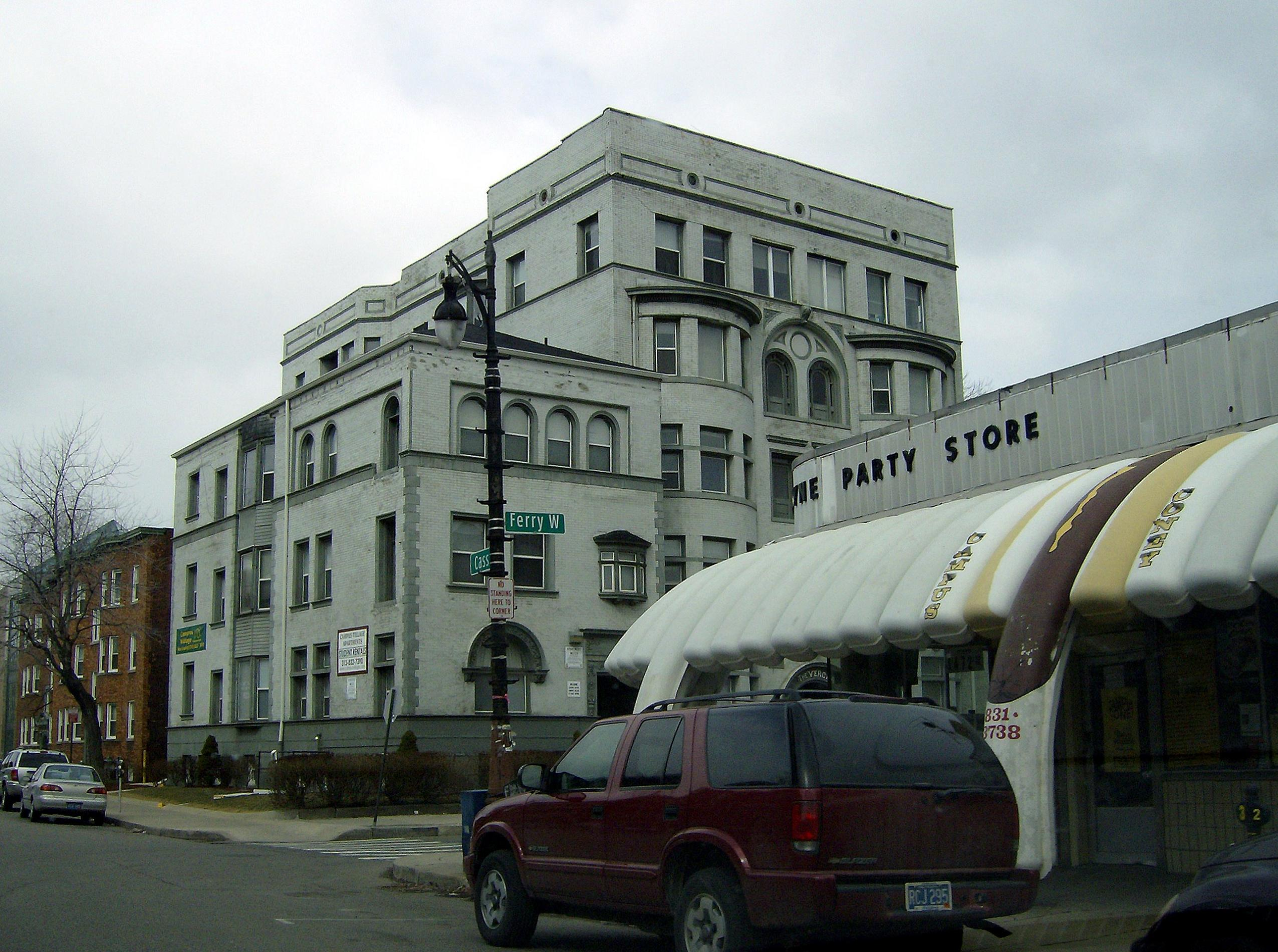
- Corner of Cass and Ferry, showing the Verona Apartments.
- Interactive map of Cass Corridor, Detroit
- Coordinates: 42°21′48″N 83°04′13″W
- Country: United States of America
- State: Michigan
- County: Wayne
- City: Detroit

Area
  - Total: 0.36 sq mi (0.93 km^{2})
  - Land: 0.36 sq mi (0.93 km^{2})
  - Water: 0.0 sq mi (0 km^{2})

Population (2010)
  - Total: 1,707
- Time zone: UTC-5 (Eastern Standard Time (North America))
  - Summer (DST): UTC-4 (Eastern Daylight Time (North America))

The Cass Corridor is a neighborhood on the west end of Midtown Detroit. It includes the Cass Park Historic District, the Cass-Davenport Historic District and Old Chinatown. This neighborhood began in the 1800s as a wealthy residential neighborhood, but declined during the 20th century.

The corridor's main street, Cass Avenue, runs parallel with M-1 (Woodward Avenue), a main Detroit artery running north toward New Center. Though Cass runs from Congress Street, ending a few miles farther north at West Grand Boulevard, the Cass Corridor generally is defined as between Interstate 75 (I-75) at its southern end and Interstate 94 (I-94) to the north, and stretches from Woodward to the east and to the west: John C. Lodge (M-10 service drive) north of Temple, and Grand River Avenue south of Temple.

== Geography ==
=== Significant landmarks ===
Located along Cass Avenue:

- Detroit Masonic Temple, the world's largest masonic temple
- Cass Technical High School, a nationally recognized magnet school and the first school established in the Cass Corridor (then called Cass Union)
- The Metropolitan Center for High Technology
- Detroit School of Arts
- Avalon International Breads, a well-known bakery emphasizing a triple bottom line philosophy

Other:

- Little Caesars Arena, the home of the NHL's Detroit Red Wings and the NBA's Detroit Pistons, is on the west side of Woodward Avenue near Interstate 75.

Former significant places:

- Detroit's Marwil Bookstore, formerly Detroit's oldest independent bookstore before it closed in 2013.

== History ==
=== Early years ===
The Cass Corridor is named after Lewis Cass, who in 1816 bought a French ribbon farm in the place that eventually developed into the Cass Corridor. As Detroit's population grew in the mid-1800s, upper middle class residents looked to expand into less populated, less developed areas. Lewis Cass's daughter, Mary Cass Canfield, inherited the property (at the time called Cass Farm) and subdivided it in 1871, allowing wealthy Detroiters to build their homes there.

As a result, early residents of this area were largely middle- and upper-class Anglo-Saxons. Connected to downtown in the 1860s and 1870s by streetcars built by the Detroit City Railway Company, the area was a peaceful residential neighborhood. Houses were most often single-family and duplexes, and the architectural style favored Queen Anne style architecture or Italianite architecture. The neighborhood built a number of grand churches, so many that they often called the area "Piety Hill." Churches founded during this time included Westminster Presbyterian Church (built in 1876 on Woodward Avenue and Parsons Street) and the Cass Avenue United Methodist Church (dedicated in1883).

=== Changes due to the automobile industry (early–mid 1900s) ===
Over the early to mid 1900s, the character of the neighborhood changed deeply due to the growth of the automobile industry. Cass Corridor's changed into a commercialized urban center with many auto-mobile related businesses as the automobile industry grew. Officials also destroyed many buildings to make room for parking lots and paved over the street cars system.

Cars also allowed development further from downtown, and wealthier residents moved. Migrants from the South moved into the old subdivided mansions and apartment complexes that the wealthier residents had left behind as they moved away. This process continued through the Great Depression, as middle class residents left Cass Corridor. However, the city was racially segregated, so while Cass Corridor became more diverse in terms of class, the population remained largely white in the Cass Corridor, while Black migrants settled on the east side of Woodward.

Cass Corridor also became a hub for entertainment and culture. For example, Detroit's Orchestra Hall, a symphony auditorium, was built in 1919; the Masonic Temple was dedicated in 1926; and Wayne State University (which now strongly characterizes the northern area of Cass Corridor) was established in 1923. Woodward Avenue had many entertainment businesses, such as the Orchestra Hall, Arcadia Ballroom (demolished in the 1970s), and the Roller Palace Rink.

=== History as a Chinatown (1960s) ===
By the 1950s, the neighborhood had become rundown. Skid Row, which had originally been located south of downtown, was totally demolished in 1962 and 1963. As a result, the unhoused people on the former Skid Row moved to the lower Cass Corridor.

At the same time, Chinese immigrants were forced to relocate from their original Chinatown (demolished to build a highway) to a small Chinatown centered around Cass Avenue and Peterboro Street. Popular businesses and community centers included the Chinese School of Detroit, Henry Yee's Forbidden City, and Chung's Cantonese Cuisine. However, many felt that the second Chinatown never achieved the heights of the first Chinatown, and the population dwindled.

Since 2023, there have been some efforts to revitalize Chinatown, including a Chinatown block party in 2025.

=== Cass Corridor Movement (1960s–1970s) ===
In the 1960s through the 1970s, the Cass Corridor became an area of cultural significance. This era is often referred to as the Cass Corridor Movement, or the Cass Corridor Group. Cass Corridor artists' styles were diverse, but they were unified by the apolitical nature of their art and a shared rejection of Modernism, responding to a shift from Modernism to Post-Modernism that was also happening in the New York City art world in the 1970s. The Cass Corridor artists were also part of anti-Establishment counterculture, which influenced where they chose to live (often communally and in run-down areas of town) and their artistic impulses and mediums.

Artists began renting cheap studio space in the Cass Corridor, which was near Detroit's Cultural Center Historic District, primarily in three major studio complexes: the Convention Hall, Common Ground of the Arts, and the Forsythe Building. The Willis Gallery—which was in the same building as Cobb's Corner, a popular hangout for artists—was instrumental in the local artists meeting each other. The curator of contemporary art at the Detroit Institute of Arts from 1968 until 1971, Sam Wagstaff, was influential in the formation of the movement.

By the end of the 1970s, most of the original group of artists had moved away, and the Cass Corridor movement was considered over. In 1980, a keystone exhibition at the Detroit Institute of Arts, Kick Out the Jams: Detroit’s Cass Corridor, 1963–1977, was organized by curators Mary Jane Jacob and Jay Belloli and featured 22 artists.

Artists associated with or influenced by the Cass Corridor artist movement include: Nancy Mitchnick, Al Loving, Robert Sestok, Brenda Goodman, Greggi Murphy, Gary Grimshaw, Tyree Guyton, Charles McGee, Ann Mikolowski, Jim Pallas, Ellen Phelan, Gilda Snowden, Robert Wilbert, Kathy Clifford, and Theo Wujcik.

=== 1970–1980s ===
In the 1970s and 1980s, the Cass Corridor became a poor neighborhood known for drugs, prostitution, and sex crimes against children. Some landlords purposely set fire to their properties, resulting in Lower Cass being nicknamed "Fire Island." The area was of significance in the Oakland County Child Killer case.

Simultaneously, Wayne State University and the City of Detroit looked to purchase properties and develop the area. In 1977, some residents formed the North Cass Community Union (NCCU) to fight for residents' needs and the neighborhood's culture. NCCU organized a fundraiser that would grow to become Dally in the Alley. To this day, Dally in the Alley retains its grassroots ethic, run by a non-hierarchical committee and executed with a low budget and on volunteer labor.

Creem, which billed itself as "America's Only Rock 'n' Roll Magazine," had its headquarters in the area. The student population contributes to the bohemian atmosphere in Cass Corridor. The artistic community has produced a number of significant artists, including Sixto Rodriguez, Negative Approach and The White Stripes, who played their first show at the Gold Dollar.

=== Revitalization ===
Since the 2000s, Joel Landy, president of the Cass Avenue Development construction company, has renovated and remodeled several buildings in the Cass Corridor. Landy was also featured in the television series American Pickers (season 3 episode "Motor City", September 19, 2011). Since 1997, Avalon International Breads has been located in the Cass Corridor. In 2015, Jack White of the band The White Stripes, opened a retail store for his record label, Third Man Records at the corner of Canfield and Cass.

The billionaire Ilitch family, owner of the Detroit Red Wings and Little Caesars, has impacted the character of the neighborhood. Over 15 years starting in the late 1990s, Mike Ilitch purchased around 70 properties but did not develop them, further driving down the cost of properties in the area. Eventually, in 2012, he proposed a plan for redeveloping the area, including an arena that would be subsidized by the city. While some have praised the development and noted decreased violent crime, the Ilitches have also been criticized for pushing out long-time residents and unhoused Detroiters, for failing to deliver on their promises of development, and for destroying historical sites like a building that was characteristic of Cass Corridor's Chinatown.

== See also ==
- Chinatown Detroit
- List of places named for Lewis Cass
