= Robert Orr (executive) =

American businessman (1953–2021)

United States Ambassador to the Asian Development Bank
- In office September 16, 2010 – January 2016
- President: Barack Obama
- Preceded by: Curtis Chin
- Succeeded by: Swati A. Dandekar

Personal details
- Born: 1953
- Died: August 12, 2021 (aged 68) Kamakura, Japan
- Education: Florida Atlantic University; Georgetown University; University of Tokyo

Robert "Skipp" Orr (1953 – August 12, 2021) was the President of Boeing Japan from 2002 to 2007, and the one-time Vice President of Motorola's European Affairs Division. At Motorola he also served as Vice President and Director of Government Relations, and also Government Relations Director for Nippon Motorola in Tokyo. In November 2006, Boeing announced that Orr was retiring as President effective March 2007.

Orr graduated from Florida Atlantic University in 1976 with a bachelor's degree in history. He subsequently earned a master's degree in government from Georgetown University, and his doctorate in political science from Tokyo University. In addition to the corporate world, he spent many years in academia and the United States Government. From 1985 to 1993, he was a professor of Political Science at Temple University Japan. He also ran the Kyoto Center for Japanese Studies and the Stanford Center for Technology and Innovation at the Stanford Japan Center in Kyoto for two years. His book, The Emergence of Japan’s Foreign Aid Power (Columbia University Press) won the 1991 Ohira Prize for best book on the Asia Pacific. Orr’s career began in 1976 when he served for two years as Legislative Assistant to Congressman Paul G. Rogers (D-FL), a 12 term member of the United States House of Representatives. Between 1978 and 1981 he served on the House Foreign Affairs Asia Subcommittee staff seconded from the Select Committee on Narcotics. In 1981, he was appointed Special Assistant to the Assistant Administrator of Asia in the United States Agency for International Development in the Department of State. He lived in Japan for over 16 years. He was fluent in Japanese and German and had intermediate command of French.

Orr was chairman of the Panasonic Foundation in the U.S. and was a major fundraiser for the Obama 2008 presidential campaign. In 2010, he was appointed by President Obama to serve as executive director of the Manila-based Asian Development Bank, with the rank of ambassador.

Orr died due to heart failure on August 12, 2021, at the age of 68 in Kamakura, Japan.

Diplomatic posts
Preceded by Curtis Chin	United States Ambassador to the Asian Development Bank; 2010–2016	Succeeded by Swati A. Dandekar
