= Grindstone =

Round sharpening stone

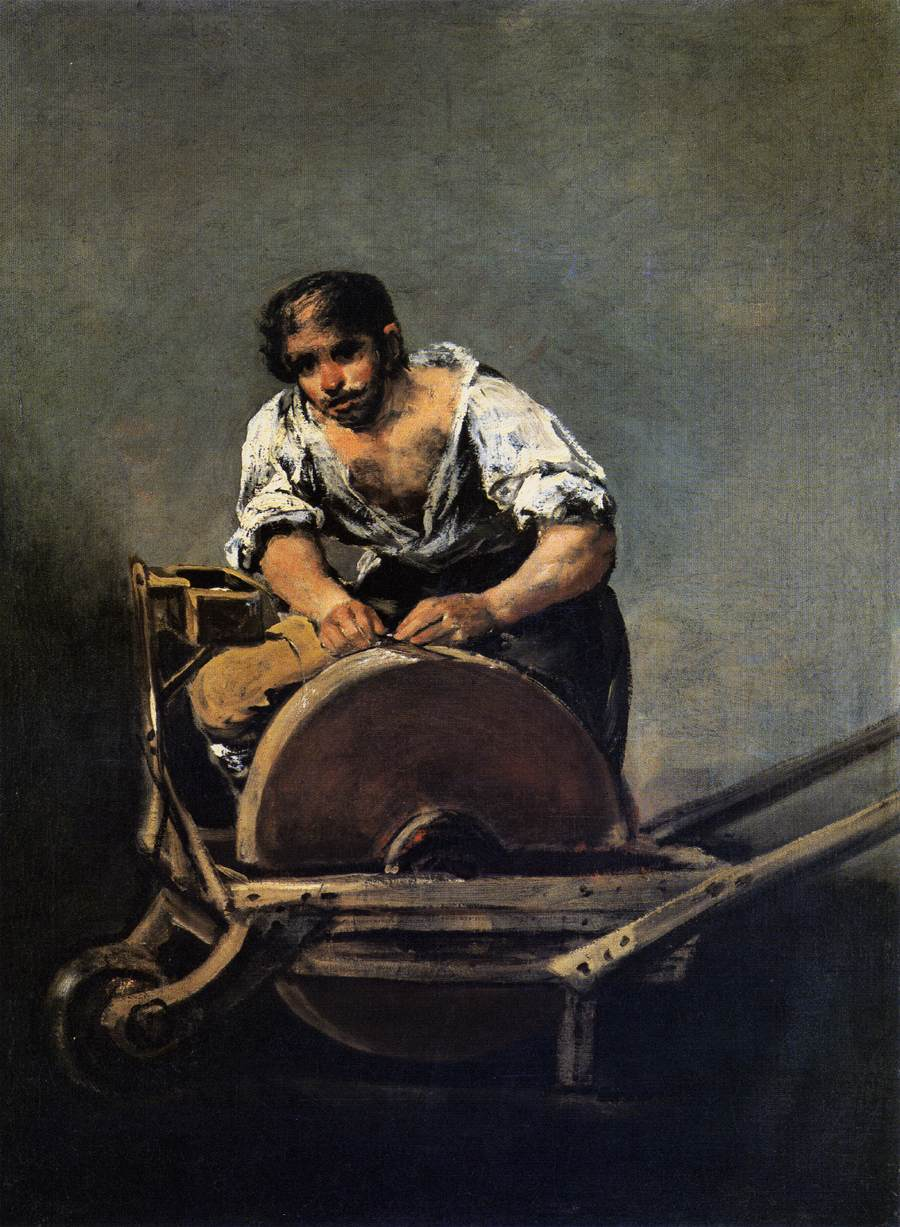
The Knife-grinder by Goya shows a man using a portable grindstone.

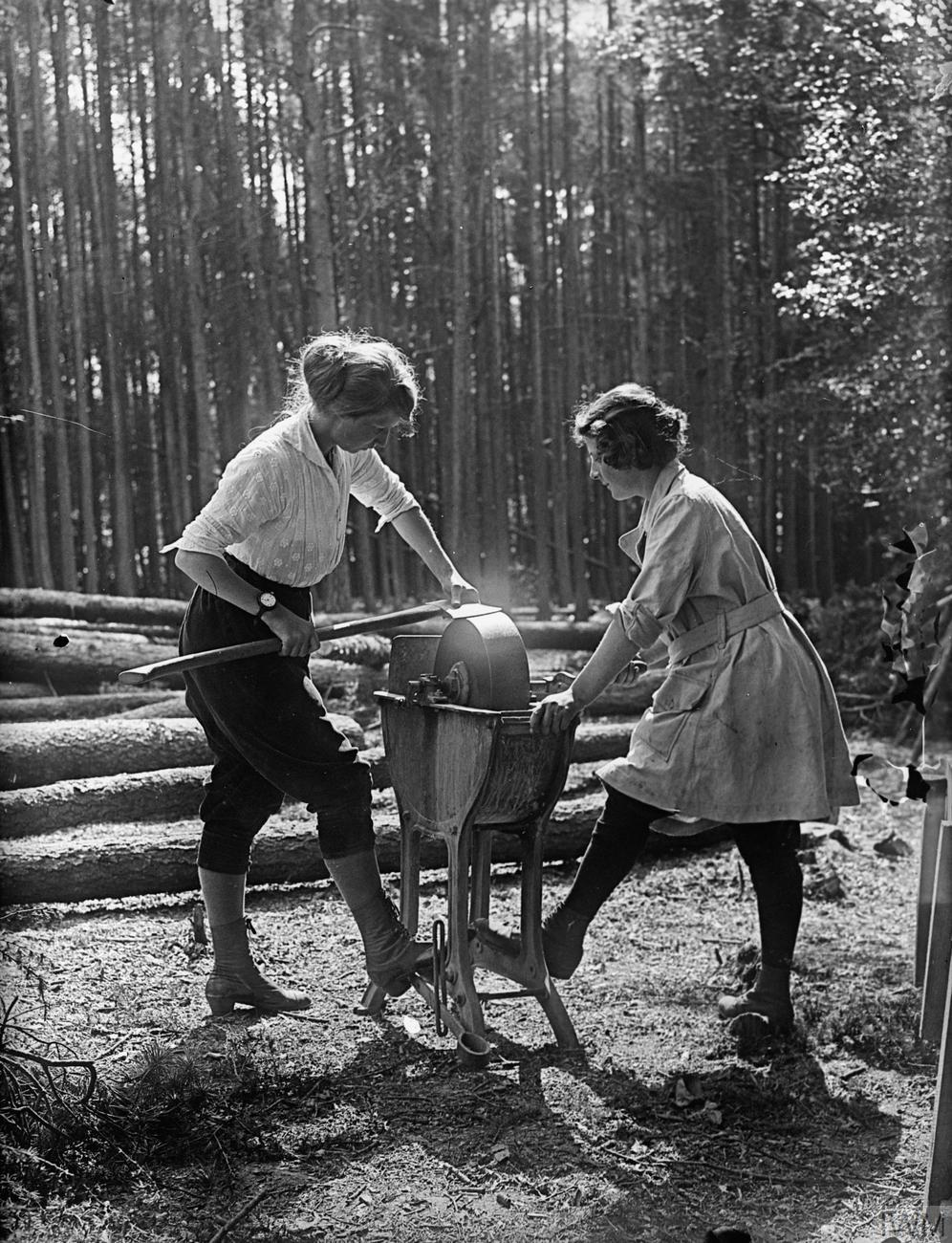
Two lumberjacks using a hand-powered grindstone to sharpen an axe during World War I

A grindstone, also known as grinding stone, is a sharpening stone used for grinding or sharpening ferrous tools, used since ancient times. Tools are sharpened by the stone's abrasive qualities that remove material from the tool through friction in order to create a fine edge. Similar to sandpaper, each stone has a different grit that will result in sharper or duller tools. In Australia, Aboriginal peoples created grinding grooves by repeated shaping of stone axes against outcrops of sandstone.

== History and description ==
Grindstones have been used since ancient times, to sharpen tools made of metal. They are usually made from sandstone.

=== Grinding grooves ===
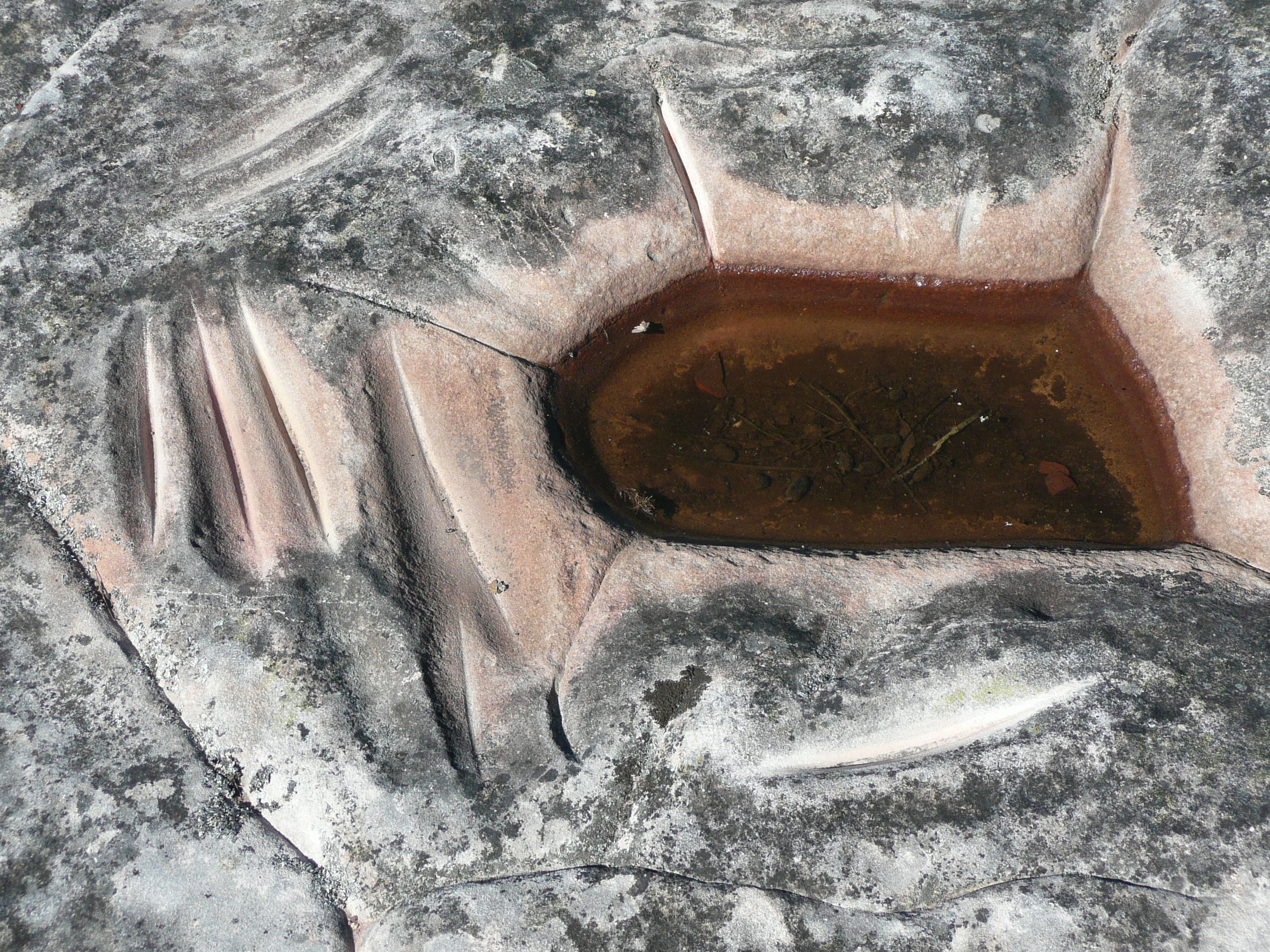
Aboriginal grinding grooves in the Blue Mountains, New South Wales, Australia

Aboriginal grinding grooves, or axe-grinding grooves, have been found across the Australian continent. The working edge of the hatchet or axe was sharpened by rubbing it against an abrasive stone, eventually leading to the creation of a shallow oval-shaped groove over time, The grooves vary in length from 80 mm (3.1 in) up to 500 mm (20 in), and can be up to 200 mm (7.9 in) wide and 100 mm (3.9 in) deep. They are often found near water, which was sprinkled on the stone during grinding to reduce dust.

=== Machines ===
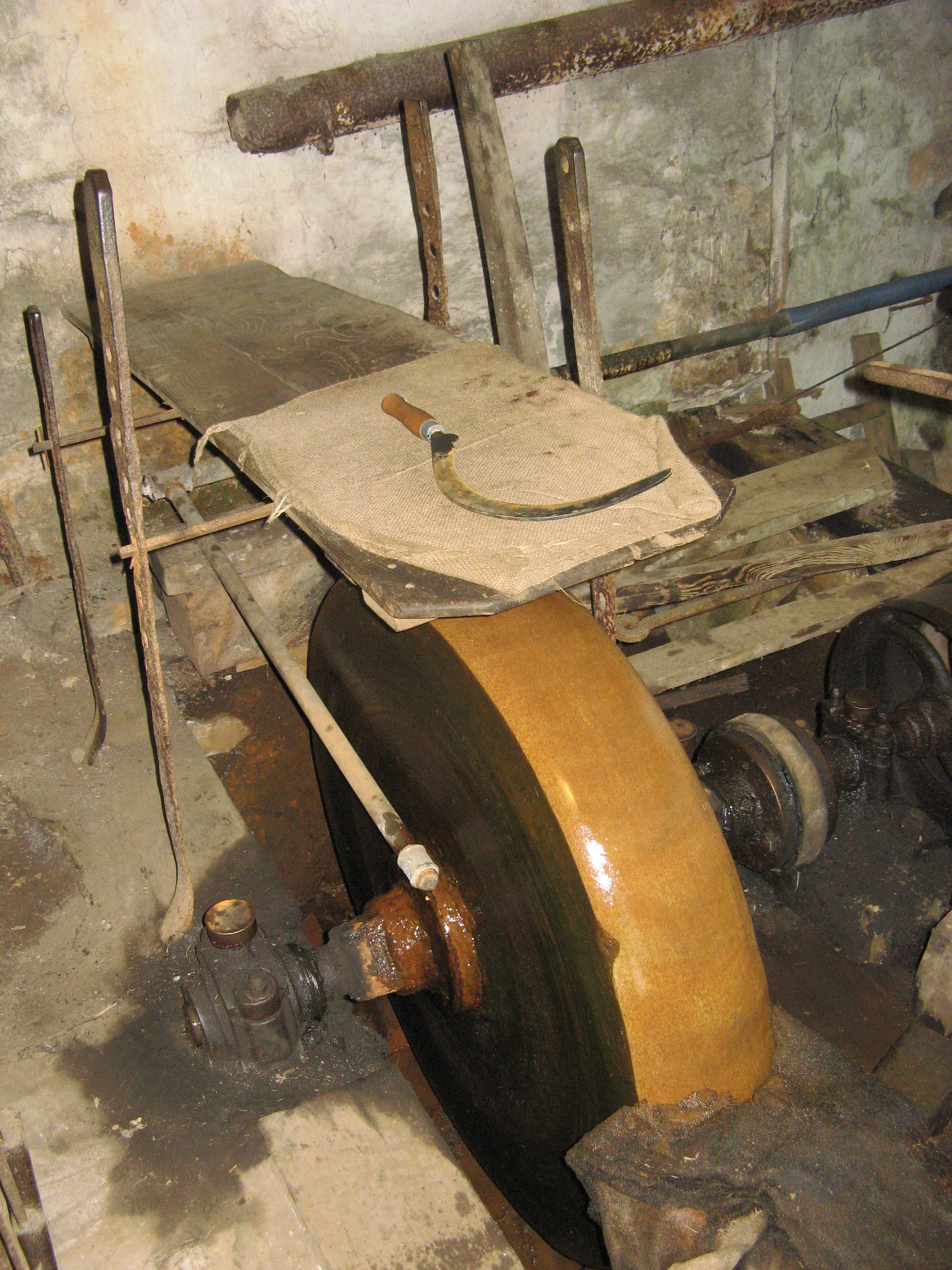
Large waterwheel powered grindstone. The user would lie on the plank above the grindstone while grinding metal items, giving rise to the phrase nose to the grindstone.

Grindstone machines work by spinning a circular piece of stone around its center point. These machines usually have pedals for speeding up and slowing down the stone to control the sharpening process. The earliest known representation of a rotary grindstone, operated by a crank handle, is found in the Carolingian manuscript known as the Utrecht Psalter. This pen drawing from about 830 goes back to a late antique original. The Luttrell Psalter, dating to around 1340, describes a grindstone rotated by two cranks, one at each end of its axle. Around 1480, the early medieval rotary grindstone was improved with a treadle and crank mechanism.

== See also ==
- Lathe
- Millstone
- Punch (tool)
- Grindstone City Historic District

== Sources ==
- Hägermann, Dieter; Schneider, Helmuth (1997), Propyläen Technikgeschichte. Landbau und Handwerk, 750 v. Chr. bis 1000 n. Chr. (2nd ed.), Berlin, ISBN 3-549-05632-X
- White, Lynn Jr. (1962), Medieval Technology and Social Change, Oxford: At the Clarendon Press
