= Chinatown, Windsor =

Windsor Chinatown
- Interactive map of Windsor Chinatown
- Coordinates: 42.301°N 83.00°W
- Country: Canada
- Province: Ontario
- City: Windsor, Ontario

Windsor's West Side neighbourhood is home to a Chinatown. As of 2012 it is the largest Chinatown in proximity to Detroit, Michigan.

The Chinatown started in 1961 with 500 Chinese to over 5,000 by 1981. The difference with Ottawa's Chinatown is that many of the Chinese residents are students studying at the University of Windsor. By 1982, an "official" establishment was made by the Essex County Chinese Canadian Association and the Chinese Benevolent Association of Windsor by establishing a "permanent" community centre on Wyandotte Street. According to another source, "... at first, the Chinese lived on the lower east side of Windsor in proximity to Riverside Drive East. This area became a redevelopment area. A new Chinatown developed around Park Street West and Dougall Road, between University Avenue in the North and Wyandotte in the South." The current commercial Chinatown has businesses scattered around the city.

== See also ==
- West Side, Windsor, Ontario
- History of the Chinese Americans in Metro Detroit
- Chinatown, Detroit
