= Chinatown, Detroit =

Chinatown
- Neighborhood of Detroit
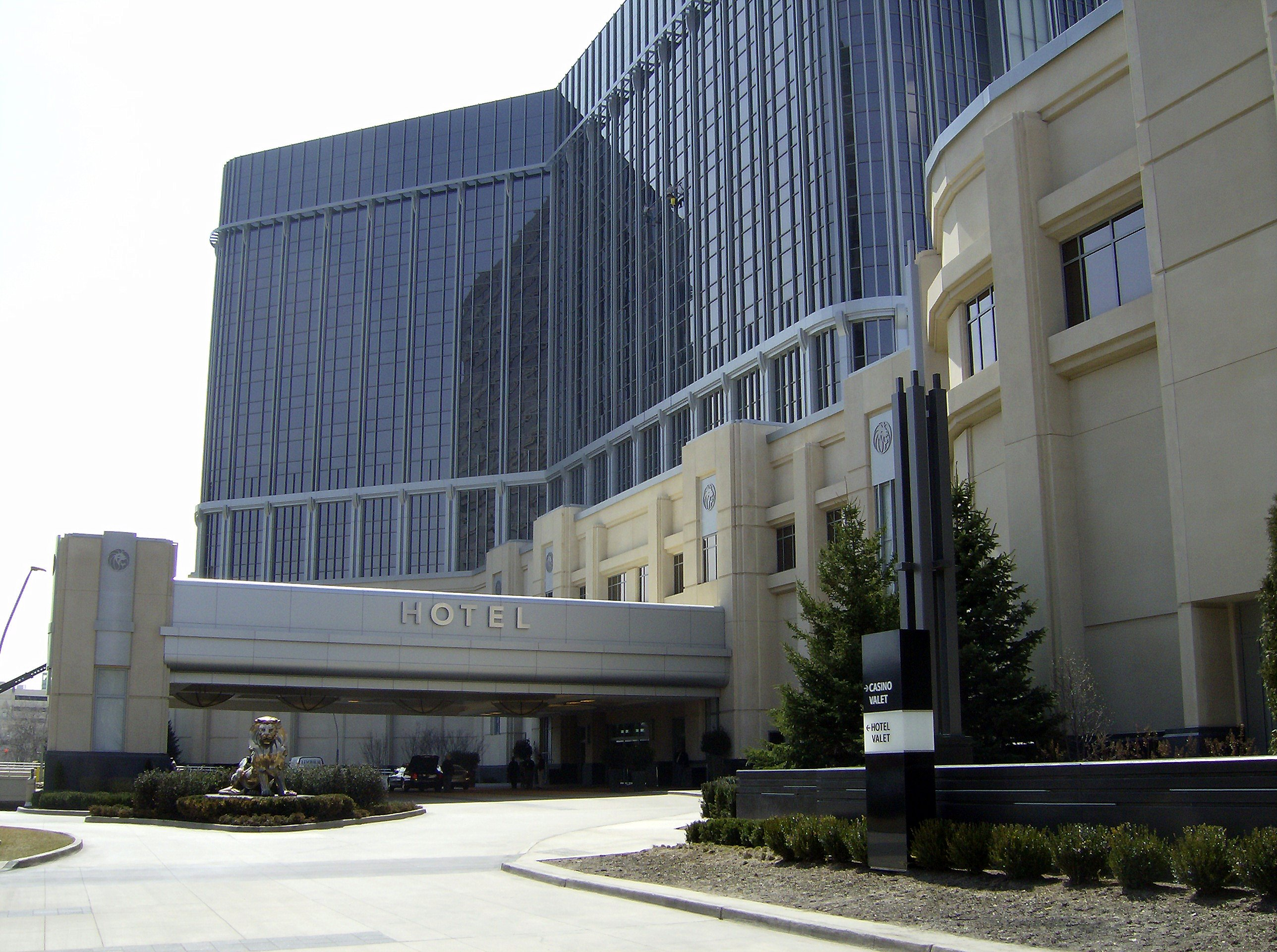
- MGM Grand Detroit in the location of the first Detroit Chinatown
- Interactive map of Chinatown
- Coordinates: 42°19′53″N 83°02′45″W
- Country: United States of America
- State: Michigan
- County: Wayne
- City: Detroit
- ZIP Code: 48202
- Area code: Area code 313

Detroit has had at least two locations that were once called "Chinatown", with the first being in a downtown location at Third Avenue, Porter St and Bagley St, now the permanent site of the MGM Grand Casino and Interstate 75's Fisher Freeway. In the 1960s urban renewal efforts facilitated its move to Cass Avenue and Peterboro, which was also an opportunity for the Chinese business community to finally purchase property.

Much of the Metro Detroit Chinese community live in the Troy area; other Asians such as Koreans also are in great number there. The old Chung’s building (opened in 1940) is being renovated while a Chinese fusion restaurant Peterboro opened in 2016, but closed briefly in the summer of 2023 to refocus. As of 2023, revitalization efforts have been under way for a revival of Detroit's Chinatown.

== History ==
Historical population
Census	Pop.	Note	%±
1910	100		—
1930	500		—
1950	3,000		—
1970	2,000		—
1990	100		—
Chinese-American population

Although it is unclear when Chinese immigrants first arrived in Detroit, as newspapers in the 1800s did not differentiate between the different cultures of East Asia, it is known that in 1874, 14 Chinese washermen lived in the city. In 1905, Detroit's first two Cantonese chop suey restaurants opened near the Detroit River. However, because the city lacked a central ethnic enclave for Chinese residents, many found it difficult to participate in their cultural practices. An article in the Detroit Free Press in 1917 announced a new apartment building was to be the location of a new Chinatown at the intersection of Third and Porter, an intersection that no longer exists today. The population grew to 2,000 by the 1920s. However, Chinatown was relocated to Cass and Peterboro sometime in the 1960s when the Detroit Housing Commission officially condemned Chinatown. Detroit's depopulation, urban decline, and escalating street violence, in particular the killing of restaurateur Tommie Lee, led to the new location's demise. After decades of depopulation and decline, the last Chinese restaurant, "Chung's", was closed in the year 2000 after 40 years of service. Although there is still a road marker indicating "Chinatown" and a mural commemorating the struggle for justice in the Vincent Chin case, few Chinese American establishments still operate within the City of Detroit. The Association of Chinese Americans Detroit Outreach Center, a small community center, serves a handful of new Chinese immigrants who still reside in the Cass Corridor. As of 2023, revitalization efforts have been under way for a revival of Detroit's Chinatown.

== Healthcare and elderly services ==
The Association of Chinese Americans operated a Chinatown clinic in the Cass Corridor Chinatown, which opened on September 9, 1973, in the On-Leong Merchants Association building. At the time of its opening, about 300 older Chinese American adults received services at the clinic. The clinic also serves individuals from other age groups. In 1985, the clinic moved to a renovated building on Peterboro Avenue. It closed in 1996 due to demographic changes.

The Detroit Drop-In Center, a center providing services to older Chinese Americans in the Cass Chinatown district, opened in October 1990. In January 2011 the main center moved to a new location in the Hannan House along Woodward Avenue.

Metro Detroit's Asian and Chinese community is centered around Ann Arbor and Troy, which are about 15% Asian or higher.

== See also ==
- History of the Chinese Americans in Metro Detroit
- Wong Wing v. United States
- Chinatown, Windsor
- Chinatowns in the United States
