= Kathy Clifford =

American painter, poet, mixed media artist

Kathy Kosht Clifford (1948 – 1993) was a painter, poet and mixed media sculptor, known for her expressionist style coming out of the Cass Corridor art movement in Detroit, Michigan.

== Education ==
Clifford attended Michigan State University from 1969 to1970 for an Independent Painting Study. She received a B.A. of arts in printmaking from Olivet College in 1971, and then a M.F.A. in drawing from Wayne State University in 1974.

== Career ==
While attending Wayne State University in the 1970s, Clifford worked and lived in the surrounding area called the Cass Corridor. She moved her studio to the Atlas Building near Detroit's Eastern Market, where she would maintain a studio for twelve years. Writing about her retrospective show in 1995, Free Press critic Marsha Miro described Clifford as part of that group of artists who lived and worked in the Cass Corridor and one of the few women who was accepted. Clifford also worked at the Women's Huron Valley Correctional Facility in Ypsilanti, Michigan for ten years. These experiences along with her academic knowledge and daily life would influence her work.

Unlike her contemporaries, Clifford's found material work was “intensely personal, sometimes romantic or foreboding, but always idiosyncratic one which did not fit in with the group” of Cass Corridor artists. Throughout her career, Clifford executed small constructed works of found wood and objects, including old metal toys and plastic figures, which she then painted, varnished, or left in their found state.

Noted Detroit artist, Ed Fraga, describes much of Clifford's work as “recordings of events, episodes and dreams rooted in her own life experience.” In the show catalog for “Guts-Detroit in the 80s” Carol Adney noted that for Detroit artists at the time, “available materials are cost- effective, (resulting in) extreme combinations juxtaposed with apparent abandon.”

Bonesteel, in his New Art Examiner review of an exhibition at N.A.M.E. gallery in 1979, stated that Clifford and her exhibition partner, Nancy Pletos, displayed extraordinary expertise in realizing their (different) visions in wood construction. Her work might incorporate tiny lights or other kinetic additions that could be plugged in. Miro described Clifford's work as the intersection of reality and fantasy, or holding an intense moment of a real experience, such as an automobile crash while Fraga describes works that depicted accidents at the moment of impact.

In Clifford's exhibition catalog, ‘It’s My Party’, commemorating her life and her works, Dennis Nawrocki stated her favorite subjects were locales rife with danger and places of escape of adventure. Clifford also was a painter, working in different mediums, some that depicted landscapes, locations, or replications from her old textbook or picture postcard collections. Nawrocki compared Clifford's style to works by early post modernists like Georgia O'Keeffe and Milton Avery.

Kathy Clifford died at the age of 44 in 1992. She suffered from a degenerative connective tissue disease her entire life.

== Solo exhibitions ==
- 1995: Kathy Clifford: A Retrospective, Detroit Focus Gallery, Detroit, MI

== Group exhibitions ==
- 1991: Structure/Paint, Detroit Artists Market, Detroit, MI
- 1990: Art for Life, Galleria, Southfield, MI
- 1988: Holland Counsel for the Arts, Juried Exhibition, Holland, MI
- 1987: Atlas to Zemco: Art in the Artist Market Neighborhood, Detroit Artist Market, Detroit, MI
- 1986: Wayne State University in Michigan - An Alumni Exhibition, Wayne State University, Detroit, MI
- 1986: G.A.L. 17th Annual Fine Art Exhibition, Traveling Exhibition
- 1984: Conflicts/Configurations, Willis Gallery, Detroit, MI
- 1984: Four Invited Artist, Detroit Artist Market, Detroit, MI
- 1983: 8th Michigan Biennial, Michigan State University, Lansing, MI
- 1982: Parallel Currents: American Folk and Fine Art, Detroit Artists Market, Detroit, MI
- 1981: GUTS: Detroit in the 80s, Herron School of Art, Indiana University-Perdue
- 1979: Painted Wood Works: Kathy Clifford and Nancy Pletos, N.A.M.E. Gallery, Chicago, IL
- 1978: Two Girls: Kathy Clifford and Vivian Wanless, Feigenson Gallery, Detroit, MI
- 1977: Two Detroit Girls, Willis Gallery, Detroit, MI
- 1977: Three Artists, Willis Gallery, Detroit, MI
- 1977: Michigan Sculpture ’77, Macomb Community College, Sterling Heights, MI
- 1976: Forsythe II, Forsythe Building, Detroit, MI
- 1976: The Michigan Printmakers, Wayne State University, Detroit, MI
- 1975: Alice Caskey, Susan Crane, Kathy Clifford, Willis Gallery, Detroit, MI
- 1974: Anything on Paper, Detroit Artists Market, Detroit, MI
- 1974: MFA Completion Exhibition, Wayne State University, Detroit, MI
- 1973: All Michigan II, Flint Institute of Arts, Flint, MI
- 1973: Art on Paper, Southern Illinois University, Carbondale, IL
- 1973: MFA National Drawing, Wayne State University, Detroit, MI

== Grants ==
- 1988: Michigan Counsel for the Arts, Creative Artist Grant
- 1981: Michigan Counsel for the Arts, Creative Artist Grant
