= Dally in the Alley =

Detroit's largest annual community festival

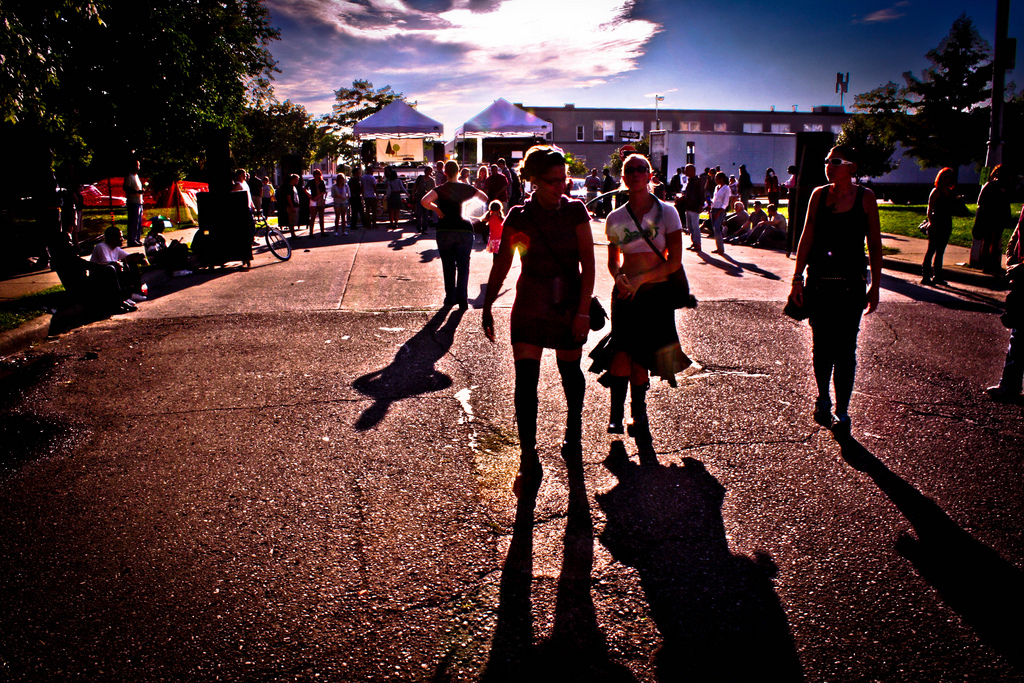
- Dally in the Alley in 2011
- Status: active
- Frequency: Annually on the Saturday after Labor Day
- Venue: On Forest, Third, W. Hancock & Second. In the alley bounded by them.
- Location: Cass Corridor
- Coordinates: 42°21′48″N 83°04′13″W
- Country: United States
- Years active: 48–49
- Inaugurated: 1977
- Area: Cass Corridor
- Organiser: NCCU
- Sponsor: North Cass Community Union
- Website: dallyinthealley.com

Dally in the Alley is Detroit's largest annual community festival, located in the Cass Corridor district (the north end, close to Wayne State University) in Detroit. The event is completely organized and executed by a team of community volunteers. According to organizers, The Dally in the Alley gives an offering of live music, visual arts, performance, food and beer.

== History ==
=== Community Background 1866-1925 ===
In 1866, Michigan Governor Lewis Cass owned a piece of farmland that spread over the current-day Cass Corridor. He sold a portion to William A. Butler that bordered Putnam to Prentis, and was bounded 2nd and 3rd Street. Apartment buildings blossomed as heirs of Butler began dividing and selling up the land. Streets began to be paved as the city expanded north.

The neighborhood started to come together at the turn of the century. Second and Third were then paved with cedar and Forest with brick, west of Woodward Avenue. In 1899 there were only 5 houses in this neighborhood, four of them being on Forest and one on Second. In 1904, Horace Elgin Dodge purchased one of the houses on Forest, and built the now demolished garage in the back (in the alley). Rumor has it that Horace created his own automobile back there, knowing how to from working for Henry Ford. Horace definitely tinkered in the garage, and at the time, he and his brother John Francis Dodge were most well known as being part of Ford Motor Company. From about 1903 to 1914, the Dodge brothers were the largest parts suppliers to Ford. In 1914, they launched a car company in their own name, Dodge Brothers Motor Car Company.

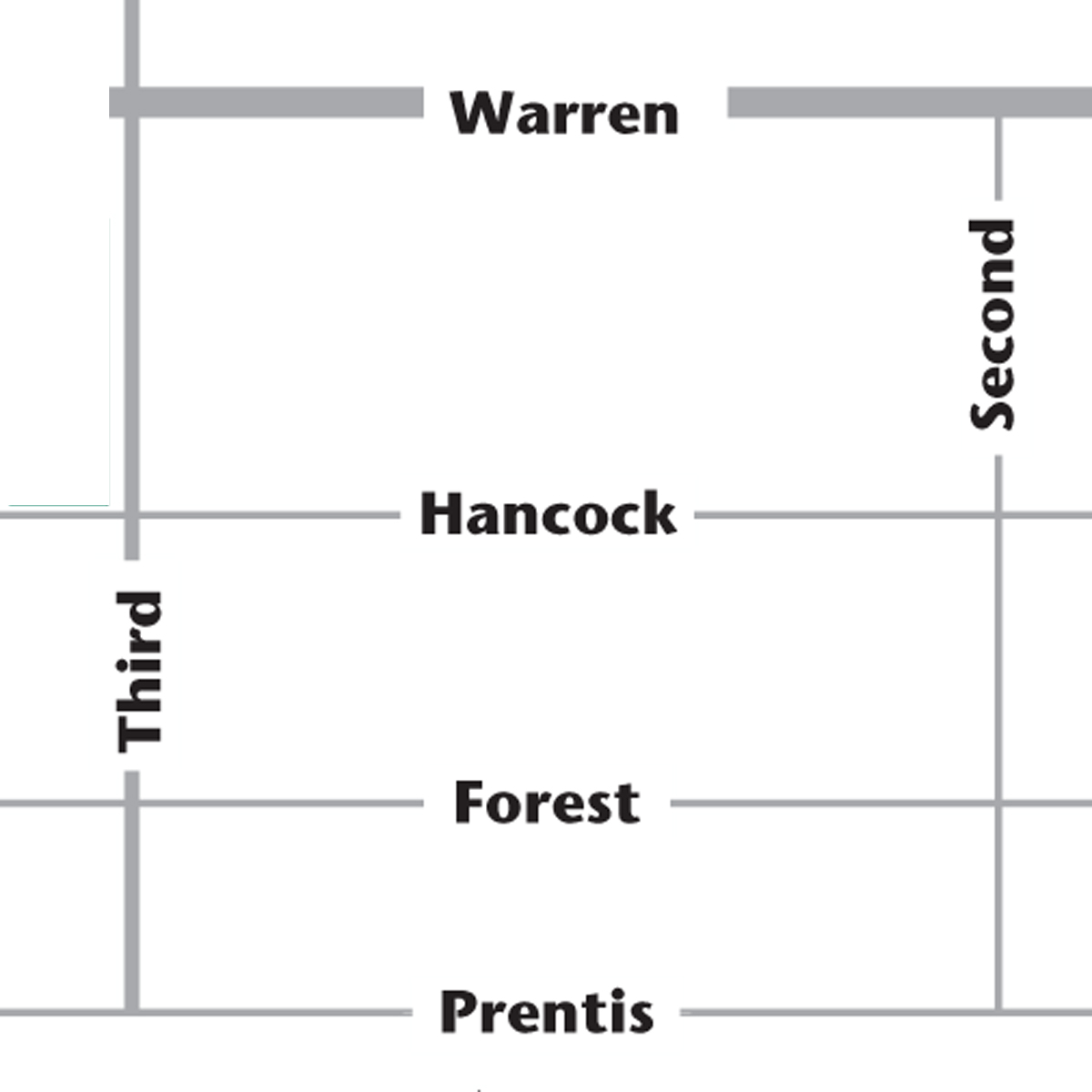
Location of Dally in the Alley

In 1910 The Winthrop, the first apartment building on Second, was built. It was the only one until the Hollender went up on the corner of Second and Forest in 1912. More and more apartment buildings started being constructed, primarily by residents living in the area.

The Wellesley, located on Hancock, was the most extravagant, largest apartment building in 1914. The Sherbrooke, located at Hancock and Third, was built that same year and would eventually be owned by Wayne State Housing in recent years. Due to a boiler problem, the building had to be shut down for financial reasons. Wayne State University has then sold the building to a private owner and is yet to be back in commission.

=== Dally in the Alley History: Since 1977 ===
The very first "Dally" was held in 1977 on the first Saturday after Labor Day. The fair didn't have its official "Dally in the Alley" title until 1982, named by Allen Schaerges, long-time Cass Corridor resident. Since then, the Dally has grown and expanded to what it is today; a popular music arts and music festival bringing in thousands of visitors.

Along with new artists and performers each year, there also comes the year's Dally in the Alley Poster, used to advertise the event. Each year, the community calls upon a local artist to create the specially designed poster and is showcased throughout the neighborhood. Most party stores, notably Marcus Market and University Market (located on Forest and Third), have the posters from each year displayed on their walls. Posters from each year can be found on the Dally's website.

In 2020 and 2021 the NCCU cancelled Dally in the Alley due to the COVID-19 pandemic, but they planned on having one in 2022. The event returned in 2022 for its 43rd year, on September 10.

== Vendors ==
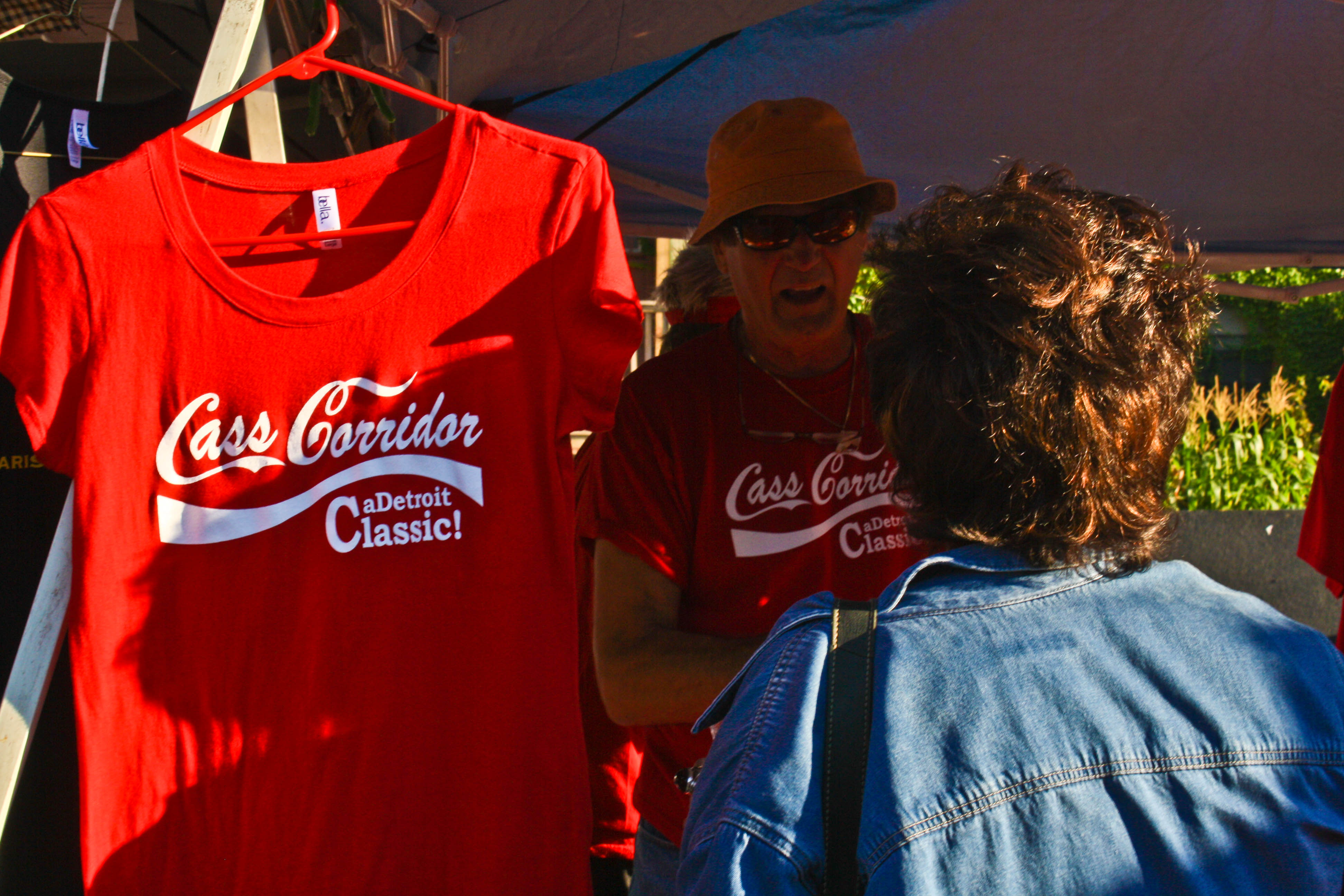
One of the many vendors at Dally in the Alley

Dally in the Alley over the years has featured numerous vendors. The vendors provide shopping and food. The Dally features Detroit's local music talent and beer for 12 hours. Vendors' arrangements are first come, first served. A small fee is also applied to those partaking in the Dally as vendors. Vendors provide a plethora of items for Dally guests.

A few things sold at the vendors are homemade jewelry, unique arts and crafts, music records, t-shirts, etc. Art and poetry workshops are also provided. Dally in the Alley caters to adults and children; they offer family-friendly activities. Some vendors will provide stations for arts and crafts and face painting. Attendees of Dally in the Alley are surrounded by many of Detroit's local restaurants. There is a whole district just for the food offered. Some of the food vendors Dally in the Alley hosts are Amicci's Pizza, Turkey Tom, Taste of Ethiopia, Oslo, Kola's Kitchen, and Mario's. One of the features of the vendors is the beer. Beer is on sale throughout the course of the Dally. Incidentally, Dally in the Alley as the name of the event is a medieval drinking song. Dally in the Alley started in the Cass Corridor which developers recently rebranded as just another section of Midtown.

== Performers ==
In 1977, an inner city art fair evolved into a performing arts festival in the vicinity of W Hancock Street, 2nd Avenue and West Forest. Today it is known as Dally in the Alley. The North Cass Community Union Is the sponsor of Detroit's Dally in the Alley. Proceeds from the Dally events are used to support North Cass projects which are said to improve the quality of life for people who live and work in the North Cass Community. The North Cass Community Union has used Dally proceeds to fund an environmental lawsuit against the City of Detroit trash incinerator, provide roaming security during nighttime hours and grant scholarships to enable neighborhood children to attend the Art Center Music School.

== Posters ==
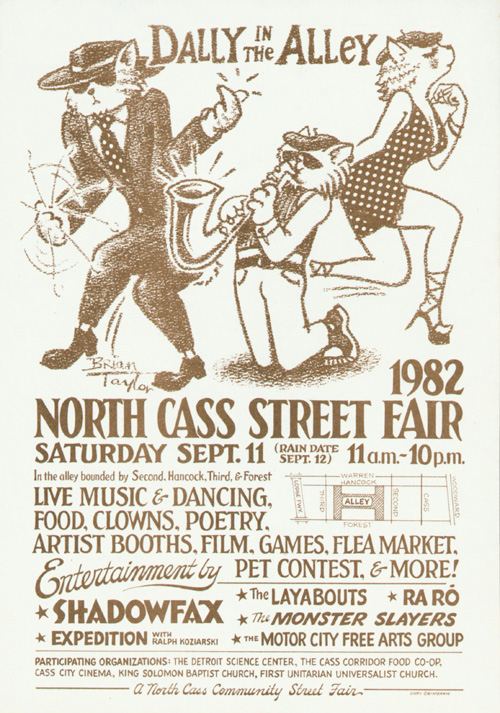
Dally's first poster in 1982.

Gary Grimshaw designed the first Dally in the alley poster in 1982, which featured dancing cats created by artist Brian Taylor. Gary was born 1946 in Detroit, Michigan and graduated from Lincoln Park high school. Gary started his artwork at the age of twenty and has continued prospering ever since. Gary went on to create two other posters in 1986 and 1987. Brian was born in 1952 in Inkster, Michigan and earned his B.A. in art at Wayne State University. He also painted the Dancing Cats in the alley where the festival is held in Detroit. Brian also designed the artwork for the 1983 and 1984 posters. As part of the Detroit mural team, Brian painted over twenty murals in Detroit. He has exhibited his fine paintings at The Traffic Jam and Snug. He currently lives in Cleveland, Ohio. Jerome Ferreti designed the Dally in the Alley poster of 2001. He took classes at a few universities, including Wayne State University. Jerome is also a part of a society of artists called Slippery Weasel, which is centered in Detroit. The Slippery Weasel's first exhibit was in Rochester, Michigan in 2005.
