= Brenda Goodman =

American artist and painter

Brenda Goodman (born in Detroit, Michigan in 1943) is an American artist and painter currently living and working in Pine Hill, New York. Her artistic practice includes paintings, works on paper, and sculptures.

== Background and education ==
Goodman received her Bachelor of Fine Arts in 1965 from the College for Creative Studies in Detroit, Michigan. She received an honorary Doctorate of Fine Arts from the College for Creative Studies in 2017. From 1965 to 1975, when she moved to New York City, Goodman was a member of the Cass Corridor Movement, the group of artists from Detroit's Cass Corridor neighborhood whose work responded to the post-industrial decline sweeping the country. It has been noted that "as one of the few women associated with the movement, Goodman’s work is especially notable."

== Work ==
Goodman has described her intuitive approach to painting as "akin to the improvisations of jazz". She has been recognized for her unorthodox use of painting materials and her exploration of both abstraction and representation in her work, which often combines elements of both. Her self-portraits have been called "one of the most powerful and disturbing achievements of portraiture in modern art".

John Yau writes "...Goodman had absorbed lessons from Surrealism, Expressionism, and Symbolism, as well as from Hieronymus Bosch, James Ensor, Alfred Kubin, and Goya."

== Exhibitions ==
Goodman's work has been exhibited at numerous galleries and museums including one-person exhibitions at Sikkema Jenkins Gallery, Pamela Salisbury Gallery, Jeff Bailey Gallery, the College for Creative Studies Center Galleries, Paul Kotula Projects, and Life on Mars Gallery. Her work has been included in group exhibitions at The Whitney Museum of American Art in New York City, the Museum of Contemporary Art in Chicago, the Baltimore Museum of Art, and the Aldrich Museum of Contemporary Art in Ridgefield, Connecticut.

== Collections ==
Collections of Goodman's work can currently be found within: The Museum of Modern Art, The Birmingham Museum of Art, The Carnegie Museum of Art, The California Center for the Arts Museum, The John D. and Catherine T. MacArthur Foundation, The Agnes Gund Foundation, Cranbrook Art Museum, The Santa Barbara Museum of Art, The Detroit Institute of Arts, The Museum of Contemporary Arts in Chicago, The First National Bank of Chicago, The American Medical Association Headquarters, and The Rutgers-Camden Collection of Art.

== Recognition ==
Goodman has been the recipient of numerous awards and grants. She received a Visual Arts Fellowship from the National Endowment for the Arts, two New York Foundation for the Arts Fellowships in Painting, and an award from the Academy of Arts and Letters. Goodman has been a visiting artist at many esteemed colleges and universities across the United States and Canada including: The University of the Arts, The Parsons School of Design, Bard College, Hunter College, The University of Michigan, The University of Tennessee, and The University of Windsor.
