= Donald Saff =

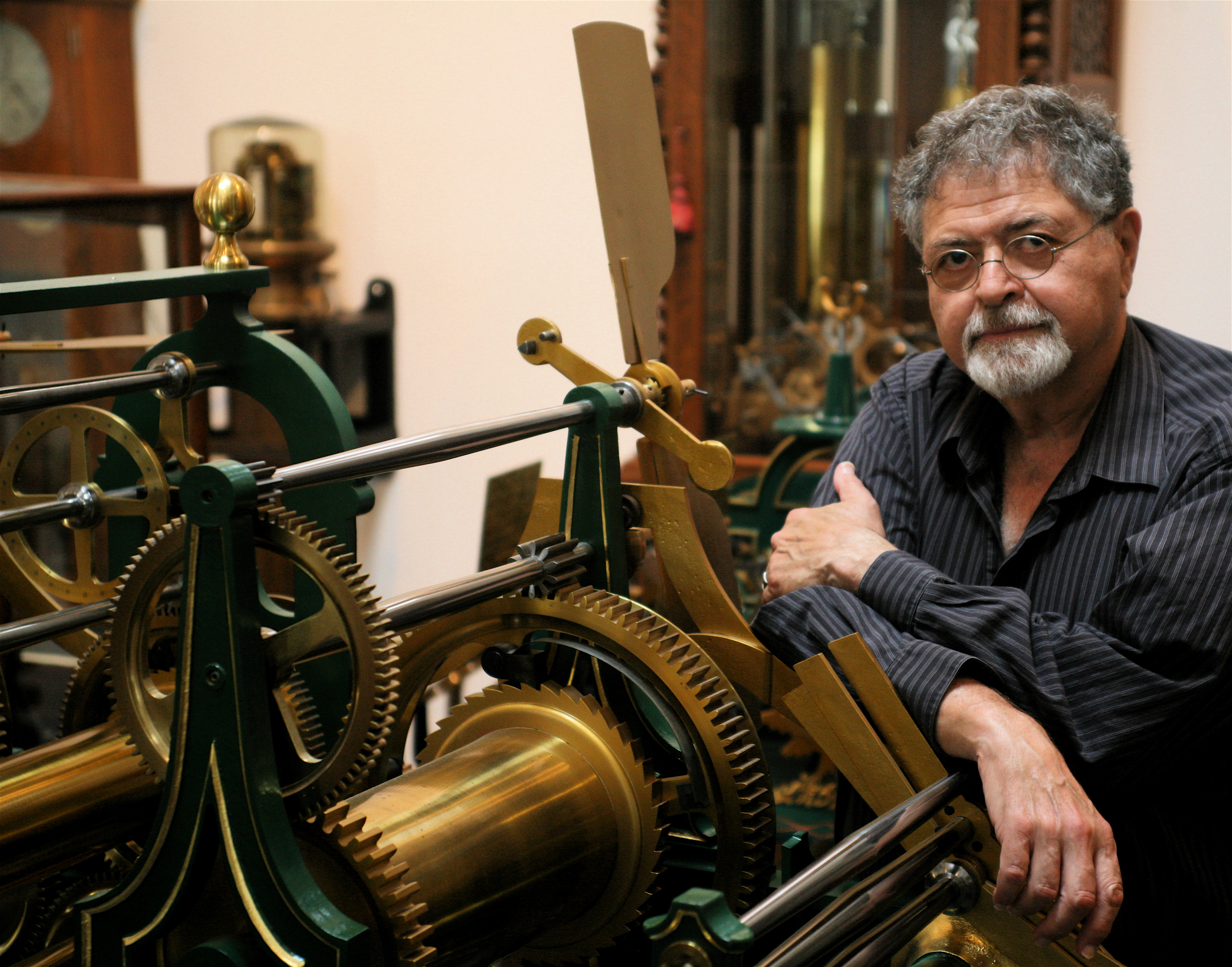
Donald Saff pictured with a nineteenth-century French tower clock.

Donald Jay Saff (born 12 December 1937) is an artist, art historian, educator, and lecturer, specializing in the fields of contemporary art in addition to American and English horology.

== Early life ==
Saff was born in Brooklyn, New York to Irving and Rose Saff and is the second of three sons. His brothers are Dr. Harvey Saff and mathematician Dr. Edward Saff.

Donald Saff began his undergraduate degree at Queens College, City University of New York, in 1955, initially envisioning a career as an electrical engineer. However, the following year Saff changed his major to art and learned printmaking, to graduate with a B.A. in 1959 and a M.A. in art history from Columbia University in 1960. In the years following, Saff was awarded a M.F.A. from Pratt Institute in 1962 and an Ed.D. in studio art and art history from Columbia University in 1964. In his early career, Saff studied with Robert Goldwater, Robert Branner, Louis Hechenbleikner, and Meyer Schapiro.

Donald Saff married Ruth Saff (née Simon) in 1960; they have two sons, Stephen Saff, A.I.A. and Jeffery Saff, J.D. and L.L.M.

== Career ==
Saff is primarily known for his work and collaboration with the leading artists of the late-twentieth century, including Robert Rauschenberg, Jim Dine, Roy Lichtenstein, James Rosenquist, Nancy Graves, Philip Pearlstein, and James Turrell. Saff's prolific career is the subject of Marilyn S. Kushner's book, Donald Saff: Art in Collaboration (2010).

=== Teaching ===
Saff began his teaching career at Queens College as a lecturer in Art History, Design, and Drawing, from 1961 to 1964. In 1965, Saff was appointed as an associate professor in the visual arts department of the University of South Florida in Tampa, Florida, and became professor and chairman of the visual arts department two years later. In 1971, Saff became the founding dean of the College of Fine Arts at U.S.F., and was awarded the rank of distinguished professor at the university in 1982. Saff was later named Dean emeritus by U.S.F. in 1989, and distinguished professor emeritus in 1996. In 1999, Saff was awarded the honorary degree of Doctor of Fine Arts at U.S.F. He was appointed the Director of Capital Projects of the Solomon R. Guggenheim Foundation, New York, in 2001, followed by the appointment of Senior Curator of Prints and Drawings in 2002.

=== Graphicstudio ===
In 1968, Saff founded Graphicstudio at U.S.F., a printing press and publisher, through funding by a seed grant from the Florida Arts Council and community supporters; the following year, Philip Pearlstein was the first artist invited to Graphicstudio to collaborate with Saff and his team. Saff became Founding Dean of the College of Fine Arts at U.S.F. in 1971. Under Saff's directorship, Graphicstudio collaborated with artists such as James Rosenquist, Robert Rauschenberg, Richard Anuszkiewicz, Shusaku Arakawa, Jim Dine, Lee Friedlander, Nancy Graves, Ed Ruscha, and Roy Lichtenstein. The collection of Graphicstudio is archived in the National Gallery of Art in Washington, D.C. After Saff retired from U.S.F., he continued to collaborate with these artists, as well as James Turrell, at Saff Tech Arts in Oxford, Maryland, which was established in 1991.

While Saff and Rauschenberg were traveling in China, Rauschenberg conceived of the Rauschenberg Overseas Culture Interchange (ROCI) in 1982, which began in 1984 with Saff as the artistic director. Saff travelled to over twenty countries and met with poets and writers in order to decide which were the most appropriate venues for the show and prepare for Rauschenberg's visit and exhibition.

In recent years, Saff has continued to lecture and write on art and the history and mechanics of nineteenth-century clocks; in particular, the work of Charles Fasoldt, in addition to the development of time distribution from the Harvard College Observatory, and the horological innovations of Richard F. Bond. He has lectured on Fasoldt for the Antiquarian Horological Association in Cincinnati, OH (2001), the National Association of Watch and Clock Collectors in Pittsburgh, PA, and Anheim, CA (2003), and at the 26th Annual Ward Francillon Time Symposium in Houston, TX (2004), among other venues. Saff continues to work with the Royal Observatory in Greenwich, collaborating with Jonathan Betts and Rory McEvoy, on the trials of Burgess Clock B. (See "Honors.")

== Exhibitions ==
Saff's individual work spans across his career of collaborative art. As early as 1965, Saff produced Duino Elegies, a print suite that was published and exhibited by Martin Gordon Gallery in New York and at the Galleria Academia in Rome; it was acquired by the Library of Congress, the Brooklyn Museum, and Lessing Rosenwald. Saff also collaborated with printers Galli and Arduini in Urbino to create print suites Breezes (1969), exhibited and published by the Martin Gordon Gallery. Additionally, Saff collaborated with Galli on print suites Paradise Lost (1970) and Numbers (1972), the former printed in Tampa, FL, and exhibited at the Martin Gordon Gallery, the University of South Florida Gallery, the Toronto Art Gallery, and the Loch Haven Art Center, FL. Numbers was exhibited at Multiples Gallery, New York. In 1979, Saff produced print suite Fables that was published and exhibited by the Getler/Pall Gallery in New York, followed by the print suite Constellations (1980), which was also exhibited at the Tom Lutrell Gallery in San Francisco. In 1981, Saff had solo exhibitions of his artwork in the Galleria d'Arte Moderna in Udine, Italy, Youngstown State University, OH, the Leo Castelli Gallery, NY, and in "Recent Acquisitions" at The Museum of Modern Art, NY. Additionally, Saff had solo exhibitions at Dyansen Gallery, NY (1982), at I. Feldman Gallery, Sarasota (1983), and at Edison Community College, FL (1988). In 1989, the retrospective Donald Saff: Mixed Metaphors, 1956–1989 was held at the Tampa Museum of Art and traveled to the Virginia Beach Center for the Arts, followed by his solo exhibition Winged Metaphors: Sculpture and Prints by Donald Saff at the Barbara Gillman Gallery in Miami later that year. In 1997, Brenau University Galleries exhibits Poetics: The Work of Donald Saff in Gainesville, GA. The same year, the Tampa Museum of Art exhibited Donald Saff/Robert Rauschenberg: In Collaboration. Finally, the Academy Art Museum in Easton, MD, exhibited Donald Saff: Gravity and Constellations; Selected Works in 2006.

== Honors ==
Saff was awarded a Teaching Fellowship at Queens College (1960), a Yaddo Fellowship, Saratoga Springs, NY (1963), and Fulbright Fellowship (1964) to Italy where he studied at Istituto Statale di Belle Arti. While in Urbino, Saff met lifelong friend and colleague Deli Sacilotto, with whom he would co-author Printmaking: History and Process (1978) and Screenprinting: History and Process (1979). He received the Governor's Award for the Arts from the State of Florida in 1973, and was awarded the Florida Endowment for the Arts Individual Artist Grant in 1980. In 1997, Saff was awarded the title "Printmaker Emeritus" by the 25th Southern Graphics Council Conference in Tampa, F.L.

In 2002, he was appointed as Visiting Distinguished Professor of Rhode Island School of Design.

In April 2015, Saff was awarded a certificate from the Guinness World Records for his work on completing the world's most accurate pendulum clock, "Clock B", which was started by Martin Burgess in 1975. The official title awarded by Guinness World Records, as "the most accurate mechanical clock with a pendulum swinging in free air is 'Clock B,' owned by Donald Saff (U.S.A.)" was presented on April 16, 2015, following the clock's 100-day trial at the Royal Observatory, Greenwich.

== Bibliography ==
- Adcock, Craig: Poetics: Work by Donald Saff. Gainesville, GA: Brenau University Galleries, 1997.
- Baro, Gene. Graphicstudio U.S.F.: An Experiment in Art and Education. Brooklyn, NY: Brooklyn Museum, 1978. ISBN 978-0872730687
- Brenson, Michael. "Art: Picasso Survey, The Late Paintings." The New York Times 2 March 1984. Accessed 5 May 2015.
- Canaday, John. "Art: A Very Good Month." The New York Times 12 October 1968: 31. NYT Archives. Accessed 5 May 2015.
- Castleman, Riva. Seven Master Printmakers: Innovations in the Eighties. New York: The Museum of Modern Art, 1991. ISBN 978-0870701948
- Dellinger, Jade. Graphicstudio: Uncommon Practice at USF. Tampa, FL: Tampa Museum of Art, 2014. ISBN 978-1-907804-35-9
- Dine, Jim. A Printmaker's Document. Göttingen, Germany: Steidl, 2013. ISBN 978-3-86930-644-5
- Donald Saff/Robert Rauschenberg: In Collaboration. Tampa, FL: Tampa Museum of Art, 1997.
- Fenes, Victor. "Video: How 'Perfect Clock' Redefines Timekeeping History, 300 Years On." Guinness World Records 28 April 2015. Accessed 4 May 2015.
- Fine, Ruth E. Gemini G.E.L.: Art and Collaboration. Washington, D.C.: National Gallery of Art; NY: Abbeville Press, 1984. ISBN 978-0896595187

---. Introduction. Donald Saff: Sculpture. Fort Myers, FL: Edison Community College, 1988.

- Fine, Ruth E., and Mary Lee Corlett. Graphicstudio: Contemporary Art from the Collaborative Workshop at the University of South Florida. Washington, D.C.: National Gallery of Art; Munich, Germany: Prestel, 1991. ISBN 978-0894681646
- Fine, Ruth E., David Joselit, and Genevieve A. Linnehan. Donald Saff: Mixed Metaphors, 1956–1989. Tampa, FL: Tampa Museum of Art, 1989.
- Gilmour, Pat. "Graphicstudio." Print Quarterly 10 (1993): 82-4.
- Kelder, Diane. "Made in Graphicstudio." Art in America 61 (1973): 84-5.

---. "Collaborative Experiments." Art News 73 (1974): 79-80.

- Kotz, Mary Lynn. "Art; Rauchenberg's Tour De Force." The New York Times 3 May 1987. Accessed 4 May 2015.
- Knigin, Michael, and Murray Zimilies. The Contemporary Lithographic Workshop Around the World. New York: Van Nostrand Reinhold Co., 1974. ISBN 978-0442244804
- Kushner, Marilyn Satin. Donald Saff: Art in Collaboration. New York: Prestel, 2010. ISBN 978-3791342054
- Milani, Joanne. "Achievements of U.S.F.'s Graphicstudio in Spotlight as Founder Returns for Honor." Tampa Tribune 4 April 1999.
- Moore, Samantha. "Top Pop Artist, Saff Team at Oxford Studio for New Interpretation of Monet." The Sunday Star [Easton, MD] 22 November 1992.
- "The National Gallery of Art Celebrates Its Graphicstudio Archive." The Print Collector's Newsletter 22 (1991): 170-1.
- Ramljak, Suzanne. "Interview: Donald Saff." Sculpture 13 (1994): 10-2.
- Rauschenberg. Essay by Donald Saff. Stockholm, Sweden: Heland Wetterling Gallery, 1989.
- ROCI: Rauschenberg Overseas Culture Interchange. Washington, D.C.: National Gallery of Art; Munich, Germany: Prestel, 1991. ISBN 0-89468-160-5
- Saff, Donald. Introduction. 7 Characters: Rauschenberg. Los Angeles, CA: Gemini G.E.L., 1983.

---. "Bond Time: The Electric Method of Time Recording." In The Science of Time 2016, Astrophysics and Space Science Proceedings, vol. 50, edited by Elisa Felicitas Arias, et al., 45. Springer, 2017. ISBN 978-3-319-59909-0

---. "Conservation of Matter: Robert Rauschenberg's Art of Acceptance." Aperture 125 (1991): 24-31.

---. From Celestial to Terrestrial Timekeeping: Clockmaking in the Bond Family. London: Antiquarian Horological Society, 2019.

---. "Graphicstudio, U.S.F." Art Journal 34 (1974): 10-8.

---. "James Rosenquist (1933-2017)." American Art 32, no. 1 (Spring 2018): 88-93. https://doi.org/10.1086/697718.

---. "Rescuing Martin Burgess's Clock B." In Harrison Decoded, edited by Rory McEvoy and Jonathan Betts, 48-56. Oxford: Oxford University Press, 2020. ISBN 9780198816812

---. "Robert Rauschenberg: The Art of Collaboration and the ART of Collaboration." Contemporary Master Prints from the Lilja Collection. Torsten Lilja. Vaduz, Liechtenstein: The Lilja Art Fund Foundation, 1995. ISBN 978-3777468303

---. "Rosenquist at Graphicstudio: A Personal View". James Rosequent at U.S.F./University of South Florida, Tampa, Florida. Tampa, FL: University of South Florida, 1988.

---. Rosenquist U.S.A./Moscow, 1961–1991. Moscow: Tretyakov Gallery, Central House of Artists, 1991.

---. "Roy Lichtenstein, Waxtype, and Other Media in Brushstroke Figures." Roy Lichtenstein: New Prints and Sculptures from Graphicstudio. Roy Lichtenstein. Gothenburg, Sweden: Wetterling Gallery, 1989.

---. Youth and the Maiden: A Morphology of Complex Boundaries in the Art of Jim Dine. Jim Dine: Youth and the Maiden. Jim Dine. London: Waddington Graphics, 1989.

- Saff, Donald, and Deli Sacilotto. Printmaking: History and Process. New York: Holt, Rinehart, and Winston, 1978. ISBN 978-0030856631

---. Screenprinting: History and Technique. New York: Holt, Rinehart, and Winston, 1979. ISBN 0-03-045491-3

- Simon, Joan, and Nancy Princenthal. Timepieces: A Collaboration of Nancy Graves with Saff Tech Arts. Gainesville, GA: Brenau University Galleries, 1995.
- Stavitsky, Gail. Waxing Poetic: Encaustic Art in America. Montclair, NJ: Montclair Art Museum, 1999. ISBN 978-0813527642
- Tuten, Frederic. Roy Licthenstein's "Last Still Life". Oxford, MD: Saff & Company, 1998.
- Yakush, Mary, ed. Rauschenberg Overseas Culture Interchange. Washington, D.C.: National Gallery of Art, 1991.
