= Nancy Mitchnick =

American painter and educator (born 1947)

Nancy Mitchnick (born 1947) is an American painter and educator. She most notably started as part of Detroit's Cass Corridor Group.

== Life and education ==
Mitchnick was born in 1947 in Detroit, Michigan. She received a BFA from Wayne State University; after working as curatorial assistant at the Detroit Institute of Arts, she did graduate studies at Wayne State.

In 1973, Mitchnick moved to New York City. She worked at an after-hours club and as a taxi driver while attending graduate school at Hunter College. She also assisted artist Brice Marden and later taught at Bard College while raising her daughter.

== Career ==
=== Painting ===
In discussing how she became a painter, Mitchnick said, "Michael Luchs gave me the best advice I’ve ever gotten. He said, 'You draw like a painter. You should paint and learn to draw as you go along.' I thought he was nuts," . Initially Mitchnick's plan was to be a performative artist involving modern dance and writing her own music, only using paint to create her backdrops. She jokes, "But I never finished learning to paint, so I'm still painting."

A group show in 1980 at the Detroit Institute of Arts called "Kick Out the Jams" gave Michnick national attention with a write-up in Artforum. Critic and curator Ruth Rattner wrote of the emerging "Detroit style" coming from this group show: "an energetic handling of materials that emphasizes their physical qualities. We recognize it in the thick stripes of pigment in Nancy Mitchnick’s portraits..." In New York, Mitchnick had her first major solo show with the Herschel and Adler Modern Gallery in 1983. Her second solo show with the gallery in 1986 garnered her a review by New York Times art critic Vivien Raynor. Raynor stated, "Mitchnick obviously cares greatly about colors, but for their own sakes more than for the effect they have on one another." Most recently, Mitchnick relocated to Detroit. In 2016, she had a solo show at the Museum of Contemporary Art Detroit called "Uncalibrated."

=== Teaching ===
Michnick has taught at Wayne State, Bard, the California Institute of the Arts, the School of Visual Arts, Summit Art Center, the New York Studio School of Drawing, Painting and Sculpture, the Vermont Studio Center, and the Visual and Environmental Studies program at Harvard University. When Mitchnick left Harvard, the Harvard Crimson newspaper reported an overall hesitation with the VES department because she was so cherished by students and professors alike.

== Awards ==
=== Art ===
- American Academy of Arts and Letters
- Kresege Artist Fellowship
- Pollock-Krasner Foundation Fellowship (in 2011 and 1990)
- Arts Achievement Award, Wayne State University, Detroit, MI
- Guggenheim Fellowship
- National Endowment for the Arts, Creative Artist Grant
- CAPS Grant, New York State Council on the Arts
- Painting Award, Michigan Artists Exhibition, Detroit Institute of Art

=== Teaching ===
- Bok Center of Learning, Harvard University
- Phi Beta Kappa, Harvard University
