= World Education Services =

Nonprofit organization

- Abbreviation: WES
- Founded: 1974
- Type: Nonprofit
- Headquarters: New York City, Toronto
- Services: Credential Evaluations
- Fields: Education
- Employees: 350–400
- Website: wes.org

World Education Services (WES) is a nonprofit organization that provides credential evaluations for international students and immigrants planning to study or work in the U.S. and Canada. Founded in 1974, it is based in New York, United States. It also has operations in Toronto, Canada, where WES Canada opened its doors in 2000.

Mariam Assefa served as WES's Executive Director and CEO, retiring in 2019 after 38 years with the organization. In 2019, WES established the WES Mariam Assefa Fund with US$30 million in funding.

WES reports that its credential evaluations are nonbinding advisory opinions.

In 1987, WES began publishing World Education News & Reviews (WENR), a publication covering international education.

WES's proprietary database collects and stores information of academic certificates of more than 200 countries, 45,000 foreign institutions, and 20,000 academic credentials. However, WES does not have formal agreements with educational systems of any country, and the kept certificates are voluntarily provided by the candidates, and they operate with third-party motives.

WES is accredited by and is a charter member of the National Association of Credential Evaluation Services (NACES) and the Alliance of Credential Evaluation Services of Canada (ACESC). The U.S. Department of Education's website lists NACES and AICE with a disclaimer that the listing of these organizations is not an endorsement.
