= Graphicstudio =

Art studio, printing press workshop

Graphicstudio is an art studio and print workshop at the University of South Florida in Tampa, Florida, established in 1968 by Donald Saff.

The studio was closed from 1976 through 1981 for financial reasons.

With the Contemporary Art Museum and the Public Art Program form the Institute for Research in Art in the College of The Arts at the University of South Florida and the support of then president Cecil Mackey, Saff modeled Graphicstudio after the Pratt Graphics Center, Tamarind Press, and Gemini G.E.L. The studio produced its earliest work in 1969.

The National Gallery of Art houses the Graphicstudio archive.

== Artists ==
Philip Pearlstein was the first artist to participate at Graphicstudio. James Rosenquist started with Graphicstudio in 1971. Richard Anuszkiewicz, Adja Yunkers, Robert Rauschenberg, and Jim Dine were also involved with Graphicstudio in the 1970s. Other artists associated with Graphicstudio over the years include Edward Ruscha, Chuck Close, Robert Mapplethorpe, Miriam Schapiro, Roy Lichtenstein, Nancy Graves, Allan McCollum, Christian Marclay, Theo Wujcik, and Vik Muniz.
