= Contemporary realism =

The contemporary realism movement is a worldwide style of painting which came into existence c. 1960s and early 1970s. Featuring a straightforward approach to representation practiced by artists such as Philip Pearlstein, Alex Katz, Jack Beal and Neil Welliver. The movement refers to figurative art works created in a natural yet highly objective style. Today the term Contemporary Realism encompasses all post-1970 sculptors and painters whose discipline is representational art, where the object is to portray the "real" and not the "ideal".

In Canada the realist movement found a strong following on the east coast in the Maritimes. The group of artists that became known as Maritime Realists developed at Mount Allison University which established the first degree granting Fine Arts program in the country. Alex Colville who taught in the Fine Arts program at Mount Allison is considered the leading figure in this movement, along with a number of his students including Christopher Pratt, Mary Pratt, Tom Forrestall, DP Brown and Nancy Stevens. Some Contemporary Realists, like Beal and Rackstraw Downes, began as trained abstract painters. (Abstract Expressionism had been well-established by c. 1960.) Rural artist enclaves (e.g., The Hamptons; areas of Maine) encouraged naturalistic imagery for some. Others shared approaches and methods of Photorealism. Some art schools, notably the Pennsylvania Academy of Fine Arts, have continued to nurture the legacy of 19th-century American Realist painting; Yale has seen a loose, inter-generational network of representational painters over the past few decades. The New York Academy of Art continues to further contemporary figurative art. A number of women artists have been prominently associated with stylistic variants of contemporary realism, including (not limited to) Jane Freilicher, Jane Wilson, Lois Dodd, Janet Fish, Catherine Murphy, Yvonne Jacquette, and Martha Mayer Erlebacher. Another woman contemporary realist is Ann Mikolowski, whose art explores representational technique in the context of photography, abstraction, and superrealism.
