= Detroit's Marwil Bookstore =

Bookstore in Detroit, Michigan

Coordinates: 42.35583°N 83.06631°W

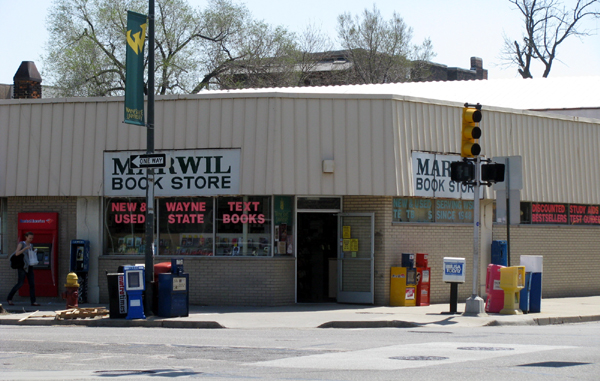
Marwil Bookstore in Detroit, Michigan

Detroit's Marwil Bookstore was a local bookstore in Detroit, Michigan. The store was independently owned by Milton and Lenore Marwil. Located on the Wayne State University campus, it was a cultural attraction for the students, faculty and community of Wayne State University. Marwil Bookstore closed permanently in December 2013.

== Location ==
Marwil Bookstore was last located at 4870 Cass Avenue (corner of Cass and Warren avenues) in the Midtown area of Detroit on Wayne State University’s main campus.

== History ==
Founded by Milton and Lenore Marwil in 1948, Marwil Bookstore was Detroit's oldest independent bookstore. The store was family owned until 1983, when it was sold to Lily Kramer. The original location on Woodward was left behind in the early 1970s in favor of a new space on Cass and Warren housed in a 3,000-square-foot (280 m^{2}) retail storefront.

Milton Marwil was born in Detroit and was a World War II veteran. He graduated from the University of Michigan in Ann Arbor, where he earned a master's degree in history. At age 91, he was the University of Michigan Dearborn's oldest student, taking courses in politics and literature. Marwil died January 17, 2002, from a heart disease.

Considered an institution by the generations of Wayne State students, the Marwil Bookstore witnessed and survived through the golden age of Motown, the civil rights movement and riots and their aftermath while many small businesses disintegrated.

== Closing ==
After operating in Detroit for 65 years, the Marwil Bookstore closed in December 2013. The decision to close was made by Brian Kramer, son of Lily Kramer, who ran the shop for 30 years. Kramer attributed the store's closure to the continuous rise in the cost of textbooks. Students began to seek alternatives to buying textbooks from bookstores, including renting or purchasing them on the internet from online competitors, such as Amazon and eBay.

After Marwil had been in business at WSU for some 59 years, Brian Kramer had seen textbook prices nearly triple over a period of two decades. According to a 2005 survey conducted by the National Association of College Students, about 25 percent of students had begun purchasing textbooks online. Another drastic change was when Wayne State opened a $6 million, 28,000-square-foot Barnes & Noble college bookstore right across the street in 2002. Marwil didn't have the fancy storefront, cafe or music and apparel that was available at the competitor across the street, but Kramer said he and his staff used their location and attraction to their benefit.

Marwil's inventory included new and used trade textbooks, art books, professional and technical books and magazines. The limited inventory prevented Marwil from being able to survive financially in the face of stiffer competition and eventually led to its closing for good.
