= Theo Wujcik =

American artist

Theodore F. Wujcik (January 29, 1936 – March 29, 2014) was an American artist who taught more than 30 years at the University of South Florida.

== Education ==
Wujcik studied at the College for Creative Studies in Detroit, Michigan under the modernist Sarkis Sarkisian. During the summer of 1963, Wujcik became skilled in lithography under Robert Blackburn at his Printmaking Workshop in New York City. He later completed his postgraduate work at the University of New Mexico Albuquerque. Utilizing a Ford Foundation grant he went on to train as a master printer at Tamarind Lithography Workshop in Los Angeles where he printed for artists such as Edward Ruscha, Jasper Johns, and David Hockney.

== Career ==
Wujcik cofounded the Detroit Lithography Workshop with master printer Aris Koutroulis and was commissioned by the Museum of Modern Art to print the suite Earth Works by Robert Morris. Wujcik soon began showing at the Donald Morris Gallery in Detroit and continued teaching printmaking. In 1970, he moved to Tampa, Florida, to become director of Graphicstudio at the University of South Florida where he remained until his retirement in 2003. There, he collaborated with Ed Ruscha, James Rosenquist, Richard Anuszkiewicz, and Larry Bell. Wujcik's paintings have been shown in many galleries and museums and have been acquired by various institutions and private collections including National Gallery of Art, Tampa Museum of Art, Museum of Fine Arts (St. Petersburg, Florida), Carnegie Institute, Pittsburgh, The Fine Arts Museums of San Francisco, Philadelphia Museum of Art, Museum of Modern Art, Whitney Museum of American Art, Museum of Fine Arts, Boston, Art Institute of Chicago, Detroit Institute of Arts, Minneapolis Institute of Art, Lowe Art Museum, University of Miami, National Portrait Gallery, The Current Hotel, and Yale University Art Gallery. Wujcik was also featured a number of times in The New York Times.

== Death ==
Theo Wujcik died in Tampa, Florida, on March 29, 2014.
