= National Association of Credential Evaluation Services =

American non-profit organization

The National Association of Credential Evaluation Services (NACES) is a United States non-profit organization, established in 1987, which is a member-based organization of private companies that provide transcript evaluation services of academic degrees awarded from non-United States educational institutions.

The United States Department of Education does not evaluate foreign academic records for equivalency to degrees issued in the U.S., this responsibility instead falling to individual institutions of higher education. While some institutions undertake such evaluations themselves, others instead refer students to one of 19 private companies which are members of NACES. Universities which accept evaluations conducted by NACES members include the University of Michigan, University of Washington, University of Nevada Las Vegas, and others. The National Institutes of Health requires prospective job applicants with non-United States degrees to have their credentials evaluated by a NACES member.

According to U.S. News & World Report, "NACES members commit to an enforced code of ethics and undergo an in-depth prescreening and yearly recertification". NACES reports its standards for accreditation of evaluation agencies require that they employ evaluation specialists who have five or more years full-time experience in international admissions at a regionally accredited American university, accept periodic on-site inspection from NACES, adhere to a code of ethics, and maintain "extensive reference, resource libraries, and other databases". NACES members are not required to evaluate credentials in a consistent manner and members remain autonomous in terms of adhering to specific credential placement recommendations. Therefore, NACES members may not be uniform in their interpretation of the comparability of the same credentials. The NACES FAQ page answers the question, "Will the evaluations from different members be identical? If not why?" by saying, "NACES does not dictate evaluation conclusions. Determinations are made based on the judgment of the senior evaluators of the NACES member organization that prepares an evaluation report. It is important to know that professional judgments can differ from one NACES member organization to another."
