= Robert Wilbert =

American painter

Robert Wilbert (1929–2016) was a contemporary American figurative painter. He was born in Chicago and later relocated to Detroit, where he taught painting at Wayne State University for 38 years. Wilbert gained recognition as an influential figure within Detroit's Cass Corridor, alongside artists such as Ellen Phelan, Gordon Newton, and Nancy Mitchnick.

While the artist's work has been exhibited nationally, Wilbert's impact is primarily felt within Detroit's creative community. Most notably, his work is part of the permanent collection at the Detroit Institute of Arts. Wilbert also gained statewide attention in 1987 when he was commissioned by the state of Michigan to design the first commemorative state postage stamp, honoring the 150th anniversary of Michigan statehood. In 2010, his work was celebrated in a gallery opening at the Scarab Club in Detroit, where he was invited to sign the famous second floor ceiling beam.

Wilbert's work continues to be represented by the Susanne Hilberry Gallery in Ferndale, MI. He is considered a seminal figure in the Detroit art community whose influence continues to be widely felt.
