= Curtis S. Chin =

American politician (born 1965)

Curtis S. Chin (born 1965) is a public figure, speaker, author and policy specialist. He has served in leadership and operational positions in the private, not-for-profit and public sectors in the Asia-Pacific region and the United States. He served as the 15th United States Ambassador to and member of the board of directors of the Asian Development Bank under both Presidents George W. Bush and Barack Obama. He also served as a trustee of World Education Services and is the inaugural Asia Fellow of the Milken Institute.

== Career ==
=== Early career at Burson-Marsteller ===
In 1986, Chin began his career at Burson-Marsteller, a global public relations and communications firm, in Washington, D.C. Over two decades, Chin counseled a wide range of global businesses and institutions, including multinational food & beverage, consumer goods & services, energy & infrastructure, finance, and telecom & technology companies, among others in often highly regulated sectors. While at college and prior to joining Burson-Marsteller, Chin had served as a White House summer intern under U.S. President Ronald Reagan, working in the Office of Vice President George H. W. Bush.

In 1990–1991, Chin was posted to Tokyo as consultant at Dentsu Burson-Marsteller. After returning to the United States, he served an 11-month stint as Special Assistant to the United States Secretary of Commerce, Barbara H. Franklin. Chin moved to Beijing in 1995, where he was subsequently appointed managing director of Burson-Marsteller's Corporate/Public Affairs practice in China in 1996 as well as head of the firm's Beijing operations. He was based in Hong Kong from 1998 to 2001, taking over leadership of and overseeing operations of Burson-Marsteller's flagship Asia office. He relocated back to Burson-Marsteller's global headquarters in New York in 2001 after September 11, where he worked in part under founder chairman Harold Burson. In New York, Chin oversaw one of the firm's largest clients, served as managing director, Asia-Pacific, and also helped guide the firm's emerging Corporate Social Responsibility consulting work. From 2006 to 2007, he also took on the role of managing director, Global Business and Client Development.

While at Burson-Marsteller, Chin was named by then-U.S. Secretary of State Colin Powell and continued under Secretary of State Condoleezza Rice as a member of the Secretary of State's Advisory Committee on Cultural Diplomacy, where he helped originate the Benjamin Franklin Award for Public Diplomacy.

=== Asian Development Bank ===
In early 2007, Chin was appointed the United States Executive Director, with rank of ambassador, to the Asian Development Bank following his testimony before the U.S. Senate Foreign Relations Committee and subsequent action by the full U.S. Senate.

He served as U.S. ambassador to the Asian Development Bank, based in Manila, Philippines, until late 2010. He was confirmed to the post by unanimous consent of the United States Senate, becoming one of the highest-ranking Asian-Americans in government and the fourth ever U.S. ambassador of Chinese heritage. In this capacity, Chin was a senior member of the United States Department of the Treasury international affairs team, serving under both Presidents George W. Bush and Barack Obama, during one of the world's most challenging economic times.

Chin advocated for human resources, risk management and governance reforms. He played a role in pushing for improved external and internal communications, and the adoption of a whistleblower policy. During his service, he sought to ensure a dialogue on and commitment to sustainable development that is focused on “people, planet and partnership”, particularly in Asia's least-developed nations. This has included seeking to ensure the ADB's commitment to strong environmental safeguards, anti-corruption efforts and diversity in its own workforce, as well as the adoption of best practices in technology, communications and management. While at the ADB, Chin's focus on the most vulnerable and on greater development cooperation and effectiveness helped drive his role in the ADB's establishing the first major partnership agreement between the ADB and UNICEF. His experience at the ADB also led Chin to create the acronym “the little BRIC”, referring to Bureaucracy, Regulation, Interventionism and Corruption. Chin argues that the little BRIC continues as one of the biggest constraints to economic growth and poses a real threat to institutions and commercial progress across all industry sectors.

=== Post-Asian Development Bank ===
Following his service at the ADB, Chin was appointed to the Board of Trustees of Community & Family Services International (CFSI), an international humanitarian organization based in Manila, Philippines. He provided oversight as a trustee of CFSI, until shifting in 2015 to a similar role with the U.S.-based, non-profit organization Friends of CFSI, and continues to advocate for the weakest and most vulnerable in the Philippines and abroad.

From 2012 to 2014, Chin was based at the Asian Institute of Technology (AIT) in Bangkok, Thailand, as a Senior Fellow and inaugural Executive-in-Residence. While housed at AIT's Corporate Social Responsibility (CSR) Asia Center, Chin worked closely with the then-AIT President and Office of the Secretary in supporting advocacy, outreach and engagement efforts to rebuild AIT's campus following 2011's devastating floods in Thailand.

He founded advisory firm RiverPeak Group, LLC in 2012, as a means to build on his prior work in the public, private and not-for-profit sectors. Through RiverPeak Group, Chin focuses on opportunities and economic growth in the United States and Asia & Pacific regions. This has in included providing counsel to Equator Pure Nature, a leading Southeast Asia-based consumer products company.

In 2013, Chin was elected to the board of World Education Services (WES), the United States’ leading authority on credential evaluation and provider of research about student mobility, international enrollment management, and transnational education. He served on the Governance Committee of the Board, and as a trustee from 2013 to 2017.

In 2015, he joined the advisory board of Dolma Impact Fund – the first international private equity fund purely focused on Nepal.
