= James Rosenquist =

American painter (1933–2017)

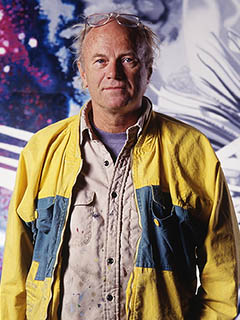
- James Rosenquist (photo by Russ Blaise, 1988)
- Born: November 29, 1933; Grand Forks, North Dakota, U.S.
- Died: March 31, 2017 (aged 83); New York City, U.S.
- Education: Minneapolis College of Art and Design; University of Minnesota; Art Students League of New York
- Known for: Painter, printmaker, graphic artist
- Movement: Pop art
- Spouses: Mary Lou Adams (m. 1960; div. 1975) Mimi Thompson (m. 1987)

James Albert Rosenquist (November 29, 1933 – March 31, 2017) was an American artist and one of the proponents of the pop art movement. Drawing from his background working in sign painting, Rosenquist's pieces often explored the role of advertising and consumer culture in art and society, utilizing techniques he learned making commercial art to depict popular cultural icons and mundane everyday objects. While his works have often been compared to those from other key figures of the pop art movement, such as Andy Warhol and Roy Lichtenstein, Rosenquist's pieces were unique in the way that they often employed elements of surrealism using fragments of advertisements and cultural imagery to emphasize the overwhelming nature of ads. He was a 2001 inductee into the Florida Artists Hall of Fame.

== Early life ==
Rosenquist was born on November 29, 1933, in Grand Forks, North Dakota, the only child of Louis and Ruth Rosenquist. His parents were amateur pilots of Swedish descent who moved from town to town to look for work, finally settling in Minneapolis, Minnesota. His mother, who was also a painter, encouraged her son to have an artistic interest. In junior high school, Rosenquist won a short-term scholarship to study at the Minneapolis School of Art and subsequently studied painting at the University of Minnesota from 1952 to 1954. In 1955, at the age of 21, he moved to New York City on scholarship to study at the Art Students League, studying under painters such as Edwin Dickinson and George Grosz. Talking about his experience at the Art Students League, Rosenquist said "I studied only with the abstract artists. They had commercial artists there teaching commercial work, I didn't bother with that. I was only interested in – see, here's how it started. I was interested in learning how to paint the Sistine Chapel. It sounds ambitious, but I wanted to go to mural school". While studying in New York, Rosenquist took up a job as a chauffeur, before deciding to join the International Brotherhood of Painters and Allied Trades. As a member of the union, Rosenquist would paint billboards around Times Square, ultimately becoming the lead painter for Artkraft‐Strauss and painting displays and windows across Fifth Avenue. By 1960, Rosenquist abandoned painting signs after a friend died by falling from scaffolding on the job. Instead of working on commercial pieces, he chose to focus on personal projects in his own studio, developing his own distinct style of painting that retained the kind of imagery, bold hues, and scale that he utilized while he painted billboards.

== Career ==
Rosenquist's career in commercial art began when he was 18, after his mother encouraged him to pursue a summer job painting. He started by painting Phillips 66 signs, going to gas stations from North Dakota to Wisconsin. After leaving school, Rosenquist took a series of odd jobs and then turned to sign painting. From 1957 to 1960, Rosenquist earned his living as a billboard painter. Rosenquist applied sign-painting techniques to the large-scale paintings he began creating in 1960. Like other pop artists, Rosenquist adapted the visual language of advertising and pop culture to the context of fine art. "I painted billboards above every candy store in Brooklyn. "I got so I could paint a Schenley whiskey bottle in my sleep", he wrote in his 2009 autobiography, Painting Below Zero: Notes on a Life in Art. Time magazine stated that "his powerful graphic style and painted montages helped define the 1960s Pop Art movement."

In 2003, art critic Peter Schjeldahl asked of Rosenquist's application of sign painting techniques to fine art thus: "[W]as importing the method into art a bit of a cheap trick? So were Warhol's photo silk-screening and Lichtenstein's lining of panels from comic strips. The goal in all cases was to fuse painting aesthetics with the semiotics of media-drenched contemporary reality. The naked efficiency of anti-personal artmaking defines classic Pop. It's as if someone were inviting you to inspect the fist with which he simultaneously punches you."

Rosenquist had his first two solo exhibitions at the Green Gallery in 1962 and 1963. He exhibited his painting F-111, a room-scale painting, at the Leo Castelli Gallery in 1965, with which he achieved international acclaim.

But Rosenquist said the following about his involvement in the Pop Art movement: "They [art critics] called me a Pop artist because I used recognizable imagery. The critics like to group people together. I didn't meet Andy Warhol until 1964. I did not really know Andy or Roy Lichtenstein that well. We all emerged separately."

In 1971 Rosenquist came to South Florida after receiving an offer from Donald Saff, dean of the University of South Florida's College of Fine Arts, to participate in the school's Graphicstudio, a collaborative art initiative. In the years following Rosenquist remained a key contributor to the studio, cooperating with students and other artists and producing numerous works of his own, ultimately creating his Aripeka studio in 1976. Rosenquist would continue to travel to Florida throughout his career with the artist developing several commissioned works for the community including two murals for Florida's state capitol building and a sculpture for Johns Hopkins All Children's Hospital, in addition to serving on the Tampa Museum of Art's Board of Trustees.

Rosenquist's paintings have been on display in the lobby of Key Tower in Cleveland, Ohio. His F-111 was displayed there for many years.

After his acclaim, Rosenquist produced large-scale commissions. This includes the three-painting suite The Swimmer in the Econo-mist (1997–1998) for Deutsche Guggenheim, Berlin, Germany, and a painting that was planned for the ceiling of the Palais de Chaillot in Paris, France.

== Works ==
Bowling Ball Eclipse (1966), Kreeger Museum

Zone: A key work in the development of his signature style, Rosenquist cites his 1961 work Zone as a turning point in the development of his own personal aesthetic, with the piece being the first to employ monumental scale, a recurring aspect of Rosenquist's art that is exemplified in his many murals. Zone also served as a stepping stone in Rosenquist's body of work in that it served as a departure from his previous works, which saw him move away from previous experiments in Abstract Expressionism, with the picture being described by Rosenquist as his first pop piece. Done in oil on two separate pieces of canvas, the work exemplifies the beginnings of the pop art movement in the way that Rosenquist takes imagery from mass media, using a picture of a tomato and a clipping from an ad for hand cream. The two images are divided into separate zones, which serve to focus on visual parallels such as the arch of the tomato stem and the woman's eyelashes, as well as illustrating Rosenquist's signature, often surreal, fragmented composition.

President Elect: Released the same year as Zone, James Rosenquist's President Elect is among one his most well-known pieces, with the artist translating a portrait of John F. Kennedy from a campaign poster onto a towering display. The painting also includes a superimposed picture of hand holding cake in greyscale, as well as the back of a Chevrolet. Rosenquist uses icons in pop culture to examine fame and the relationship between advertising and the consumer, exploring the kind of fame and iconography that comes with American politics. With President Elect, Rosenquist seeks to make a statement on the new role that advertising and mass media had during the Kennedy's campaign. "I was very interested at that time in people who advertised themselves," said Rosenquist. "Why did they put up an advertisement of themselves? So that was his face. And his promise was half a Chevrolet and a piece of stale cake." In the painting, Rosenquist contrasts the portrait of Kennedy with the cake and the Chevrolet to show how each element is marketed to American consumers.

F-111: In 1965, James Rosenquist completed F-111, his first solo show at Leo Castelli gallery, and one of the largest and most ambitious works in his collection. Standing at around twenty-six meters wide and three meters across twenty-three canvases, the painting's scale evokes Rosenquist's work on billboards, illustrating a life-sized depiction of the F-111 Aardvark aircraft. The painting was initially intended to cover all four walls of the main room in the Castelli gallery in Manhattan, occupying the entirety of each wall with overstimulating images, creating an imposing, continuous view of the rapid expansion of military forces and escalating violence during the Vietnam war. Painted during the Vietnam war, F-111 contrasts images from the war with bright and highly saturated commercial imagery from advertisements, showing tires, a cake, lightbulbs, a girl in a salon hairdryer, bubbles, and spaghetti. Rosenquist juxtaposes imagery derived from the appropriated advertisements with the aircraft, including broken light bulbs near the plane’s cockpit and the hood of the hairdryer positioned very close to the plane, resembling destructive military weapons. Rosenquist uses the painting to question and prompt conversation about the role of mass consumerism and coverage of the war in the media.

== Honors ==
To be creative is to be accepting, but it's also to be harsh on one's self. You just don't paint colors for the silliness of it all.

— James Rosenquist

Rosenquist received numerous honors, including selection as "Art In America Young Talent USA" in 1963, appointment to a six-year term on the Board of the National Council of the Arts in 1978, and receiving the Golden Plate Award from the American Academy of Achievement in 1988. In 2002, the Fundación Cristóbal Gabarrón conferred upon him its annual international award for art, in recognition of his contributions to universal culture.

Beginning with his first early-career retrospectives in 1972 organized by the Whitney Museum of American Art, New York City, and the Wallraf-Richartz Museum, Cologne, Rosenquist's work was the subject of several gallery and museum exhibitions, both in the United States and abroad. The Solomon R. Guggenheim Museum organized a full-career retrospective in 2003, which travelled internationally, and was organized by curators Walter Hopps and Sarah Bancroft.

His F-111, shown at The Jewish Museum in 1965, was mentioned in a chapter of Polaroids from the Dead by Douglas Coupland.

== Art market ==
The highest price paid for one of his paintings is Be Beautiful (1964), sold at Sotheby's by $3,301,000, in May 2014.

== Personal life ==
Rosenquist married twice and had two children. With his first wife, Mary Lou Adams, whom he married on June 5, 1960, he had one child: John. This marriage ended in divorce. In 1976, a year after his divorce, he moved to Aripeka, Florida. His second wife was Mimi Thompson, whom he married on April 18, 1987, and they had one child: Lily.

In April 2009, a fire swept through Hernando County, Florida, where Rosenquist had lived for 30 years, burning his house, studios, and warehouse. All of his paintings stored on his property were destroyed, including art for an upcoming show.

== Death ==
Rosenquist died at his home in New York City on March 31, 2017, after a long illness; he was 83 years old. His survivors include his wife, Thompson; one daughter, Lily; one son, John; and a grandson, Oscar.
