= Grindstone City Historic District =

- U.S. National Register of Historic Places
- U.S. Historic district
- Michigan State Historic Site
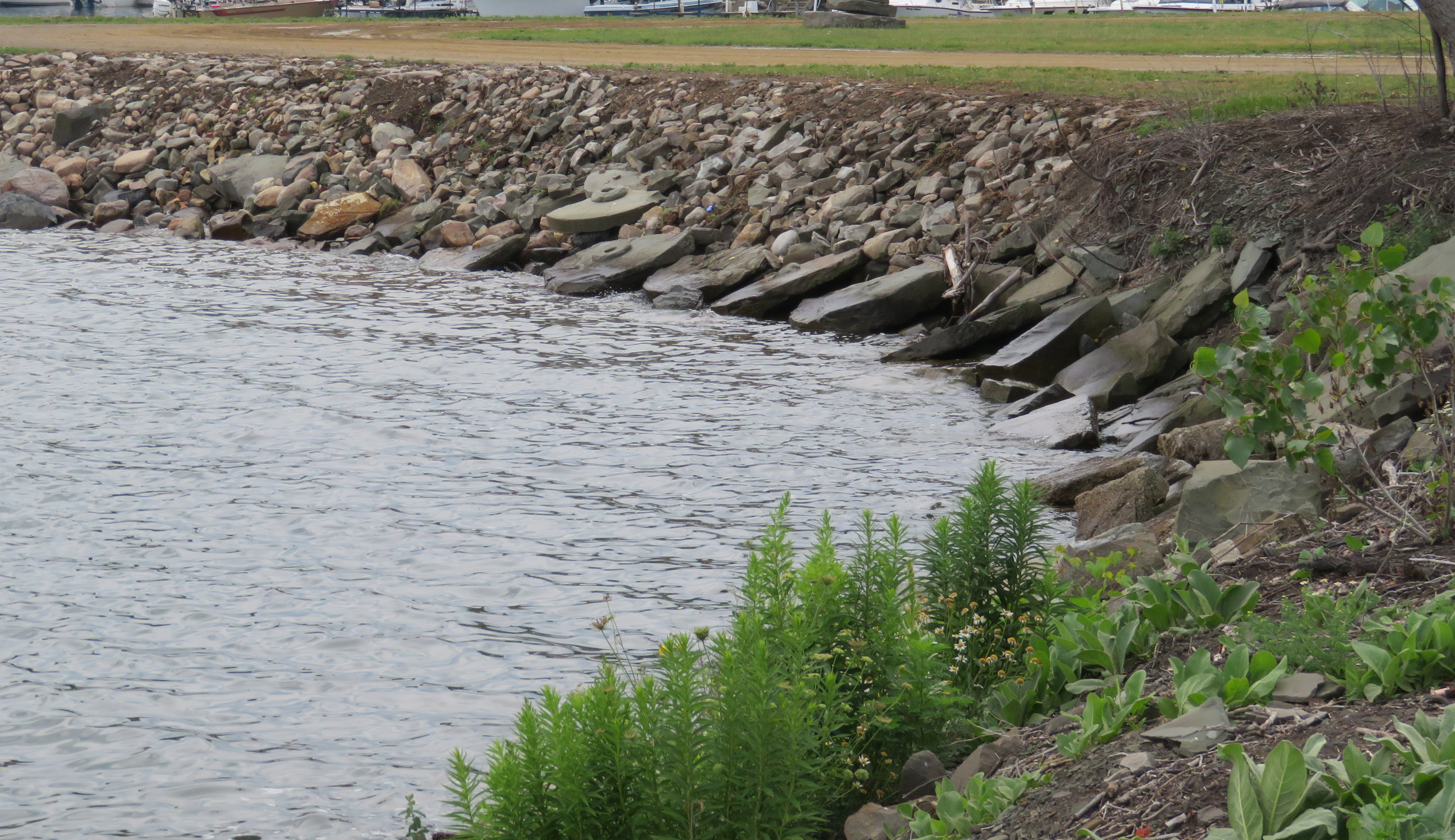
- Beach with grindstones

- Location within Michigan Location within the United States
- Interactive map
- Location: On M-25, Grindstone City, Michigan
- Coordinates: 44°3′16″N 82°53′53″W
- Area: 250 acres (100 ha)
- Built: 1884
- Built by: Capt. A.G. Peer
- NRHP reference No.: 71000393
- Added to NRHP: September 3, 1971

Grindstone City Historic District is an industrial historic district located on M-25 in Grindstone City, Michigan. It was listed on the National Register of Historic Places in 1971.

== History ==
Captain Aaron G. Peer was born in Dundas, Ontario, in 1812, and moved to Algonac, Michigan, in 1821. In 1833, Peer and his brother built a schooner and went in to the lake transport business, locating at the tip of Michigan's thumb. Peer also began a grindstone quarry at this site, and by 1850 was selling $3000 of grindstones a year. A second quarry was opened in the area, and eventually two large companies, the Lake Huron Stone Company and the Cleveland Stone Company, took over all operations in the area.

By 1888, Grindstone City had a population of about 1500, and the two companies employed 200 men. Both companies rented houses to workmen and operated a company store. The grindstones were produced in a range of sizes, ranging from whetstones to three-ton stones. The companies operated until the Great Depression, which brought an end to operations. By the early 1970s, only two buildings remained from the original operation, along with the remains of the quarries.

== Description ==
The Grindstone City Historic District consists of about 250 acres of land, including quarry sites and two original buildings. At the time of nomination, there were no other buildings on the site, although subsequently a portion has been turned into a subdivision. Most of the quarry pits have been filled with rubble, and trees cover the operations. Two jetties extend out into Lake Huron.

The two original buildings remaining are both stone structures. One is a two-story building measuring 28 feet by 50 feet, with a tablet on the facade reading "Built by Capt. A.G. Peer, 1884." The other is a three-story former grain mill, with "Wallace Mills, 1887" along the roofline.

== Gallery ==
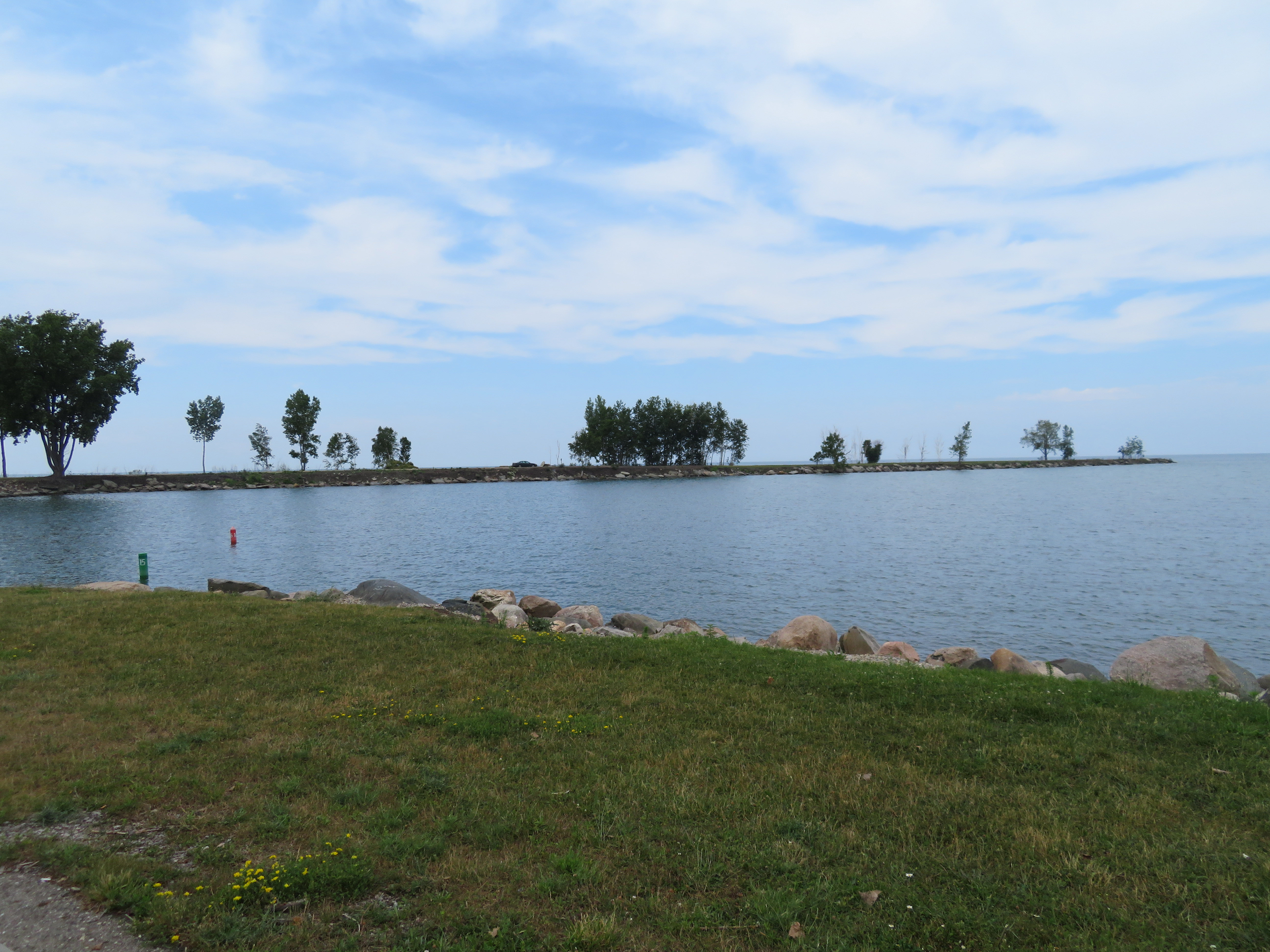
Piers

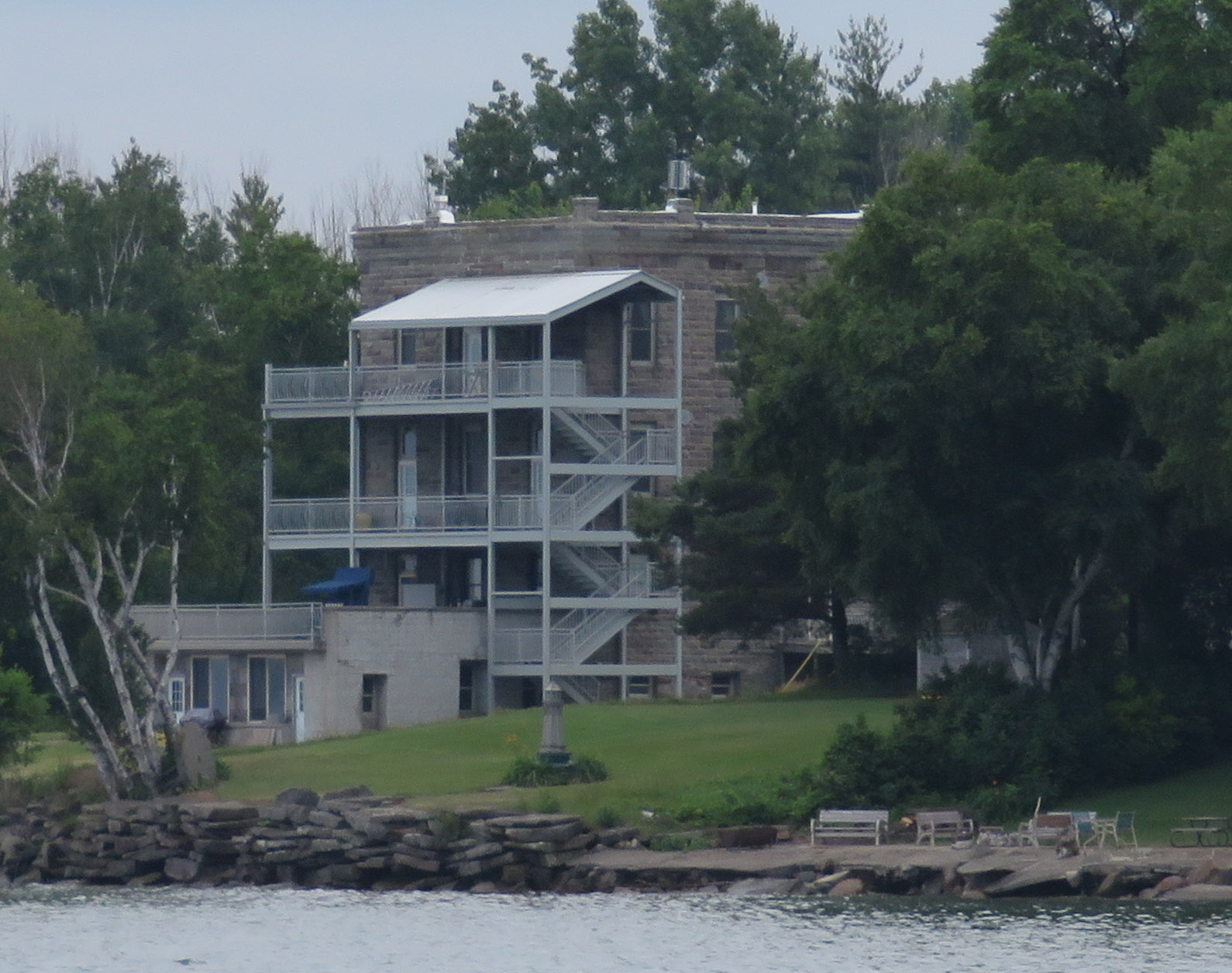
Gristmill
