= Ethnic groups in Metro Detroit =

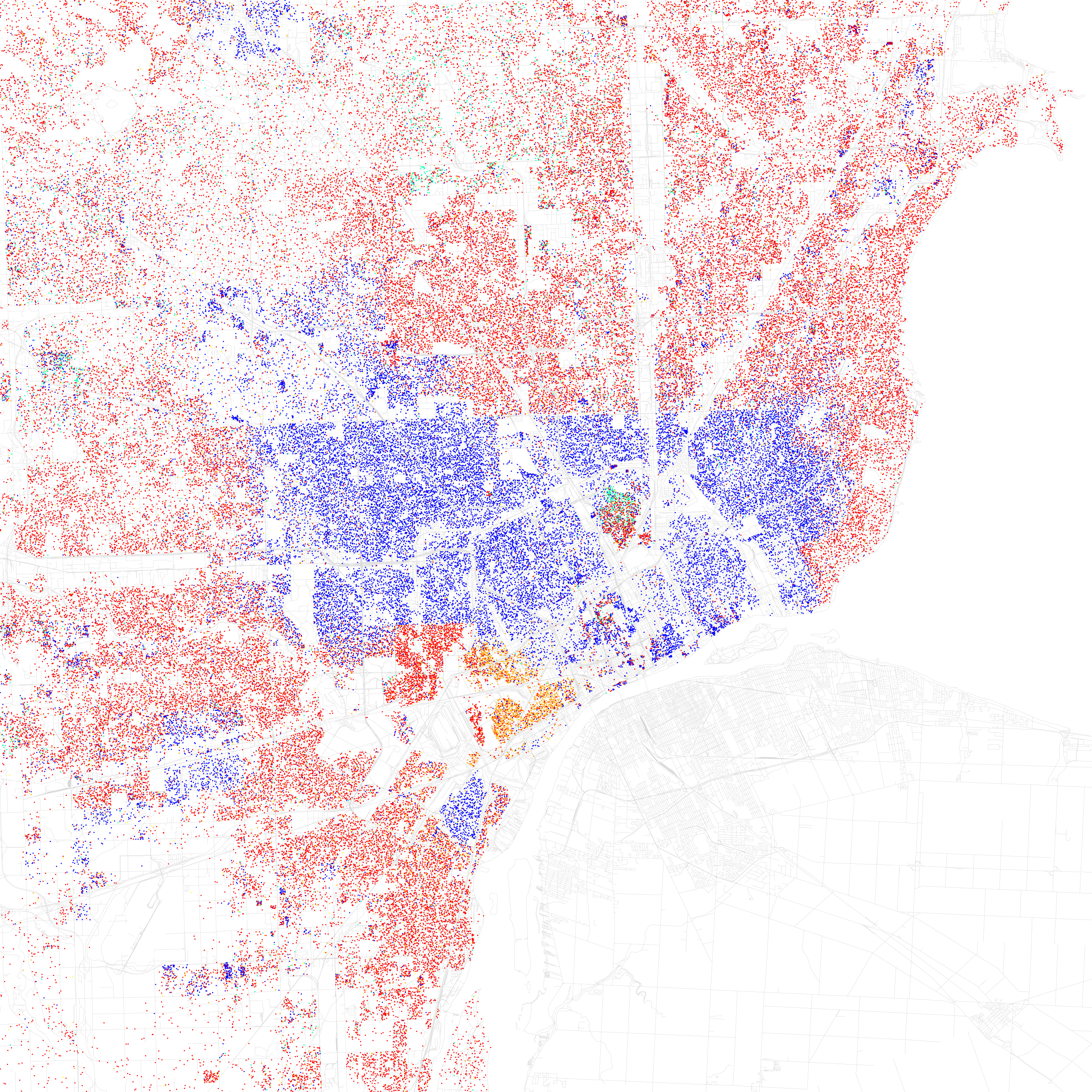
Map of racial distribution in Metro Detroit, 2010 U.S. census. Each dot is 25 people. White African-American Asian Hispanic (of any race) Other

Metro Detroit has the following ethnic groups:

== White/European Americans ==
In the early 20th century, white immigrants from Europe and migrants from the Southern United States moved into the eastside of Detroit and established ethnic groups began moving to more outlying areas. Around World War I ethnic Poles were the largest ethnic group in Detroit. In the early 20th century, "native"-born whites, Scots-Irish Appalachian hill people, former farmhands from Midwestern states, and wealthier descendants of older ethnic groups in Detroit lived in outlying areas of Detroit. Steve Babson, author of Working Detroit: The Making of a Union Town, wrote that "native" whites dominated these outlying areas. Immigrants from English-speaking countries lived throughout the city of Detroit, and Highland Park's concentration of those immigrants was higher than average.

From 1990 to 2000 over half of the white population that remained in Detroit left the city. As of 2000, Livonia was 96% white, making it the city in the United States with over 100,000 people that had the highest percentage of white people. From 2013 to 2014 the white population in the City of Detroit rose by 8,000; this was the first significant increase in the white population there since 1950.

=== Albanian American ===
The organization Global Detroit stated that the largest group of ethnic Albanians not in Europe is in Metro Detroit. As of 2014, 4,800 ethnic Albanians live in Macomb County, making up the fourth-largest ethnic group, and the highest concentration of Albanians in Metro Detroit.

=== Jewish American ===
As of 2001 about 96,000 Jewish Americans live in Metro Detroit. 75% of them live in Oakland County. Many are in walking distances to their synagogues. As of 2006 the Jews living in Windsor, Ontario, live closer to Downtown Detroit than the Jewish communities within Metro Detroit.

=== Macedonian Americans ===
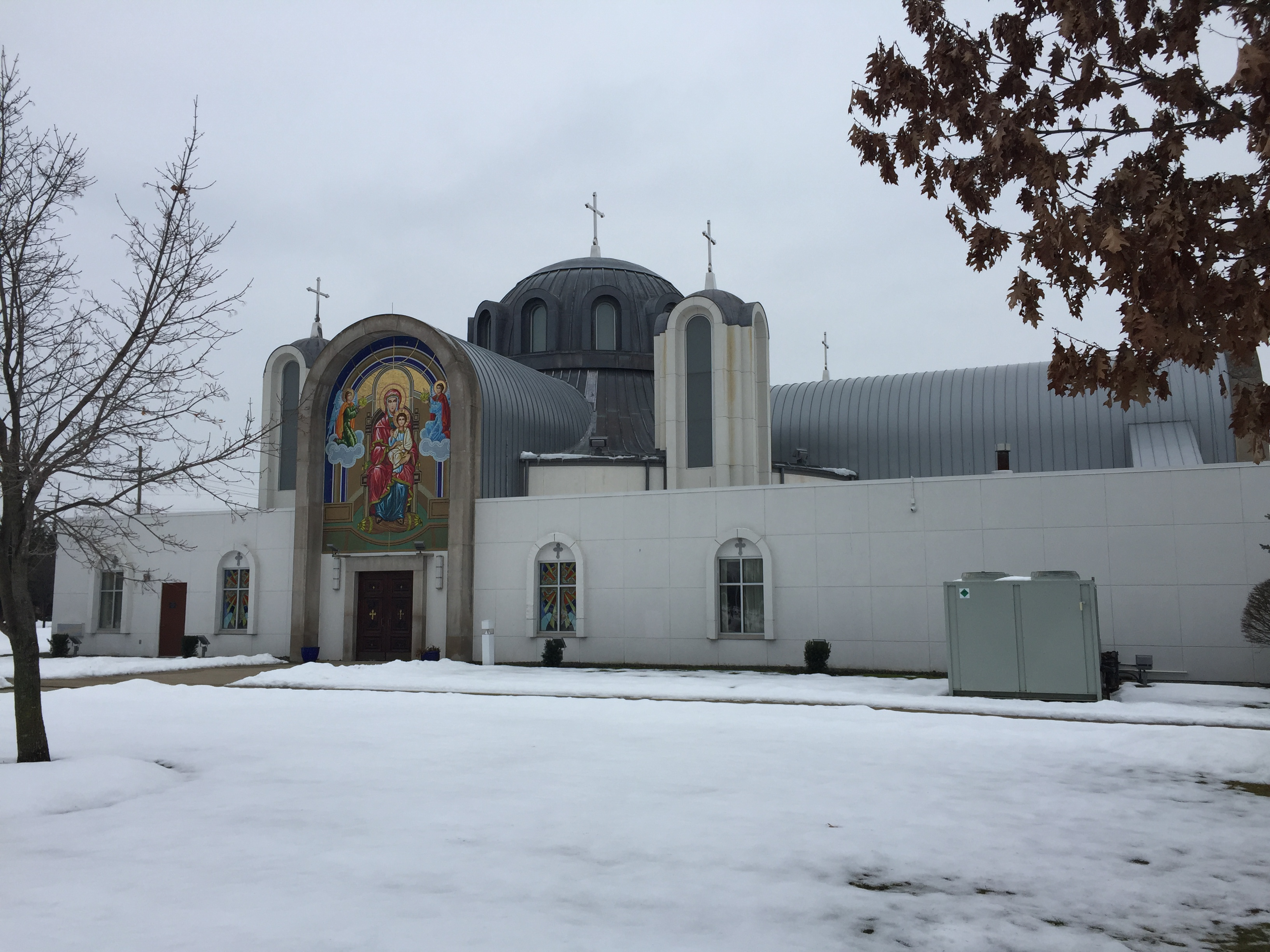
St Mary's Macedonian Orthodox Church in Sterling Heights, Michigan

According to the Harvard Encyclopedia of American Ethnic Groups, almost all of Macedonian Americans in the U.S. until World War II classified themselves as Macedonian Bulgarians or simply as Bulgarians.

Around 50,000 Macedonians immigrated to the United States following the 1903 Ilinden Uprising, including many settling in Detroit, Dearborn, and Dearborn Heights. The Henry Ford $5 per day salary and wages in the auto industry caused Macedonian immigration to increase. After World War I Macedonians in Bouf, Greece were forced to leave, so several went to Michigan. After the 1924 Immigration Act, many Macedonians entered Detroit via Canada to get around the new law. More Macedonians immigrated to Michigan after the Greek Civil War.

As of 1951 there were about 10,000 Macedonian ethnic people in the city. In 1904 the group began arriving to Detroit and the years 1911 to 1919 had the largest amount of immigration. Many Macedonians from Bulgaria, Vardar in the Macedonia of Yugoslavia, and Bouf, Greece settled in Metro Detroit to the Refugee Act of 1953 and the Immigration and Nationality Act of 1965, with Hamtramck as their settlement area.

Historically Macedonians have operated Coney islands. Besides the auto industry, Macedonians also had construction, service industry, and trucking jobs.

Mike Ilitch is an ethnic Macedonian.

According to Cetinich Macedonians operate most of the Polish bakeries in Hamtramck and he stated that many Macedonian immigrants who operated bakeries and restaurants used the Greek ethnicity as their identity "in order to simplify their complicated immigration history".

In 1925 Macedonians in Detroit founded the Selskoto samopomošno društvo Buf ("Buf Village Benevolence Society"). In the 1920s Boof and Tetovo societies were only for men.

According to Babson, during the 1920s men "were the unquestioned authority and usually the sole breadwinner among adult members" of Bulgarian families, especially Macedonian ones, and that wives of first generation immigrants were only able to socialize in the house, marketplace, and church.

In the 1990s, ethnic Macedonians in Sterling Heights, together with ethnic Serbs, had the nickname "Yugos" and they often had conflicts with "Albos", or ethnic Albanians.

=== Greek American ===
As of 1999 120,000 in Metro Detroit indicated they are of Greek descent. Stavros K. Frangos, author of Greeks in Michigan, stated "From the 1890s to the present all available sources agree that" about one third of Michigan's Greek Americans live in Metro Detroit.

=== Hungarian American ===
In the late 1890s the Hungarians began to populate Detroit. They settled Delray in Southwest Detroit. In 1898 the Michigan Malleable Iron Company began operations in Delray. Hungarian immigrants moved to Delray from cities including Cleveland, Ohio; South Bend, Indiana; and Toledo, Ohio to get better working conditions and better wages. In 1905 a Hungarian Catholic church opened in Delray. The Holy Cross Hungarian Catholic Church opened sometime before 1925. The Hungarians became one of the largest groups to settle in Detroit in the early 20th century. The Delray-Springwells area served as the "Little Hungary" of Detroit and Michigan's Hungarian culture was centered in that community.

In the 1950s Hungarians escaped the Hungarian Revolution of 1956, causing more to arrive in Delray. The construction of Interstate 75 in the mid-1960s destroyed large parts of Delray and divided the community into two pieces. Middle and working class Hungarians moved to Allen Park, Lincoln Park, Melvindale, and Riverview. Some Hungarians also moved to Taylor.

=== Italian American ===
The National Italian American Foundation estimated that in 1990, Metro Detroit had 280,000 ethnic Italians. As of 2005 the closest remaining large Little Italy near Detroit was Via Italia in Windsor, Ontario, and there was a group of remaining Italian shops and restaurants along Garfield Road in Clinton Township. In 2005 Armando Delicato, author of Italians in Detroit, wrote that "Unlike some other national groups, like the Poles, who still look to Hamtramck, or the Mexicans, who have Mexicantown, Italian Detroiters no longer have a geographical center".

=== Polish American ===
As of 2001, the Metro Detroit area had the U.S.'s second largest Polish ethnic concentration after Chicago. By the 21st century, the Wayne, Oakland, and Macomb counties formed the center of Michigan's Polish populations. Many Poles had moved from Hamtramck, and Troy became the center of the Polish-American community.

=== Romani American ===
There is a Roma community in Detroit. Many Romani people in the Detroit metro area are of Hungarian and Slovak origin.

=== Romanian American ===
Around 1904 Romanians began arriving in Michigan, with most of them settling in Detroit. By 1920 the city had the largest concentration of Romanians in the Midwestern United States. After an influx of thousands Romanians into Detroit from Cleveland, Ohio, occurring from 1920 to 1926, due to automobile industry jobs, Detroit gained the largest Romanian population in the United States. A Romanian episcopate established for serving the United States was established in Detroit in 1929. By 1930 the state of Michigan had over 11,000 Romanians. As of 2005, 26,857 persons with Romanian ancestry lived in southwest Detroit.

=== Other White/European American ===
As of 2001, Metro Detroit also had the U.S.'s largest concentrations of Belgians and Maltese people that year.

A group of Dutch people arrived in Detroit after Henry Ford's $5 per day wage announcement. Jan Reef, a Dutch immigrant to Detroit, developed a gear process utilized by early automakers. Arthur M. Woodward, author of This is Detroit, 1701-2001, wrote that "the auto industry is indebted to" Reef.

As of 1951, the Estonian newspapers distributed in Detroit were published in other cities. Those newspapers were Estonian Word, Free Estonian Word, Our Road, and Our Voice. As of that year there were no Estonian-language schools in Detroit.

The first Finns to move to Detroit arrived to manufacture automobile bodies for the Ford Motor Company. They were previously skilled metalworkers in Massachusetts. Many Finns located in the copper country in the Upper Peninsula of Michigan moved down to Detroit after Henry Ford announced his $5 per day wage. Steve Babson, author of Working Detroit, stated that in the 1920s, women from Finnish and Hungarian houses had "considerably more freedom" compared to those from Italian and Macedonian houses. Women from Hungarian and Finnish houses opened social groups for both sexes such as political, benevolent, and sports groups; women from the ethnicities often had more encouragement to attend high school and further education compared to Italians and Macedonians.

As of 1999, 25% of people in Metro Detroit stated that they had German heritage. The state of Michigan sent representatives to New York and Germany, including Bavaria, to attract German workers during the middle of the 1800s. Historically in Detroit Germans who were in the trades focused on the brewing industry. Most Germans in Detroit moved to areas along Gratiot in the east side while some moved to areas in Michigan Avenue. In a later period, many Germans resettled in Macomb County.

As of 1951, there was no specific Lithuanian cemetery in Detroit.

In 1904, the City of Detroit had 1,300 Russians. By 1925, the number of Russians increased to 49,000. As of 1951, there were no Russian newspapers in Detroit.

Historically, in Detroit, Scots who were in the trades focused on tool-making and practiced their trade in automobile plants.

As of 1951, about 2,500 Swiss people lived throughout various areas in the City of Detroit. Swiss people began coming to Detroit before 1900 and in 1920 to 1930 the peak Swiss immigration period occurred. The Detroit Swiss Society had Swiss as members. There was no particular church for the Swiss members.

In the early 20th century, the Yugoslav American Independent Club tried to unite the Croatian, Serbian, and Slovenian groups in Detroit. Infighting between Croats and Serbs caused those efforts to fail. In the 1990s, ethnic Serbs in Sterling Heights, together with ethnic Macedonians, had the nickname "Yugos" and they often had conflicts with "Albos", or ethnic Albanians.

Detroit was a cultural hub for Bulgarians.

A large number of Belarusians had migrated to Detroit during the 20th century. Due to America's handling of Belarusian migrants, many integrated themselves into the Polish or Russian communities, instead of forming their own.

== Black/African Americans ==
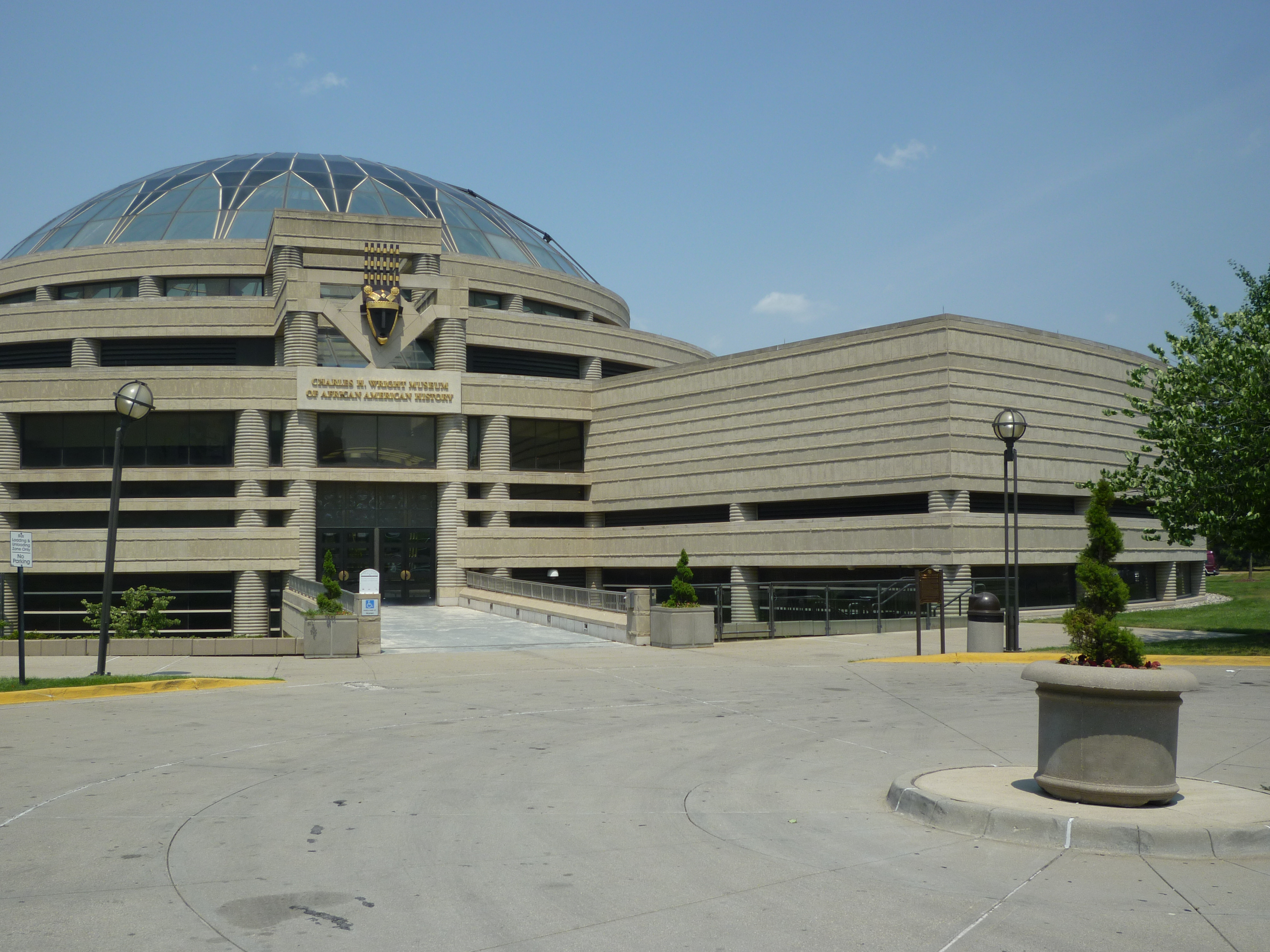
Charles H. Wright Museum of African American History in Detroit

As of 2002 72% of Michigan's metropolitan black population resides in the Detroit PMSA. That year, Wayne County had 864,627 black people, making up 42% of its total residents and 85% of the total number of black people in the PMSA. In 2002 Oakland County had the second highest black population in the state, with 119,708 black people. Aside from Wayne, Oakland, and Genesee counties, there were no counties in Michigan that had over 50,000 black people.

In 2002 Detroit had 771,966 black residents, making up 81.2% of its population and making it the city with the largest African-American population in Michigan. That year it was also, out of all of the U.S. cities with 100,000 or more people, the city with the second highest percentage of black people. Southfield was the city with the third largest African-American population, with 42,259 people. Pontiac had the fifth largest black population, with 31,416 people. In 2002 the Michigan city with the highest percentage of black residents was Highland Park, with 93% of its population being black.

There are approximately 14,000 African immigrants living in the Metro Detroit area.

== Middle Eastern Americans ==
In 2004 Metro Detroit had one of the largest settlements of Middle Eastern people, including Arabs, Armenians and Assyrians, in the United States. As of 2007 about 300,000 people in Southeastern Michigan trace their descent from the Middle East. Dearborn has a sizeable Arab community, with many Assyrian, and Lebanese who immigrated for jobs in the auto industry in the 1920s along with more recent Yemenis and Iraqis. In 2010 four Metro Detroit counties had at least 200,000 people of Middle Eastern origin. Bobby Ghosh of Time said that some estimates give much larger numbers. From 1990 to 2000 the percentage of people speaking Arabic in the home increased by 90% in the Wayne, Oakland, and Macomb counties region, with a 106% increase in Wayne County, a 99.5% increase in Macomb County, and a 41% increase in Oakland County.

=== Arab American ===
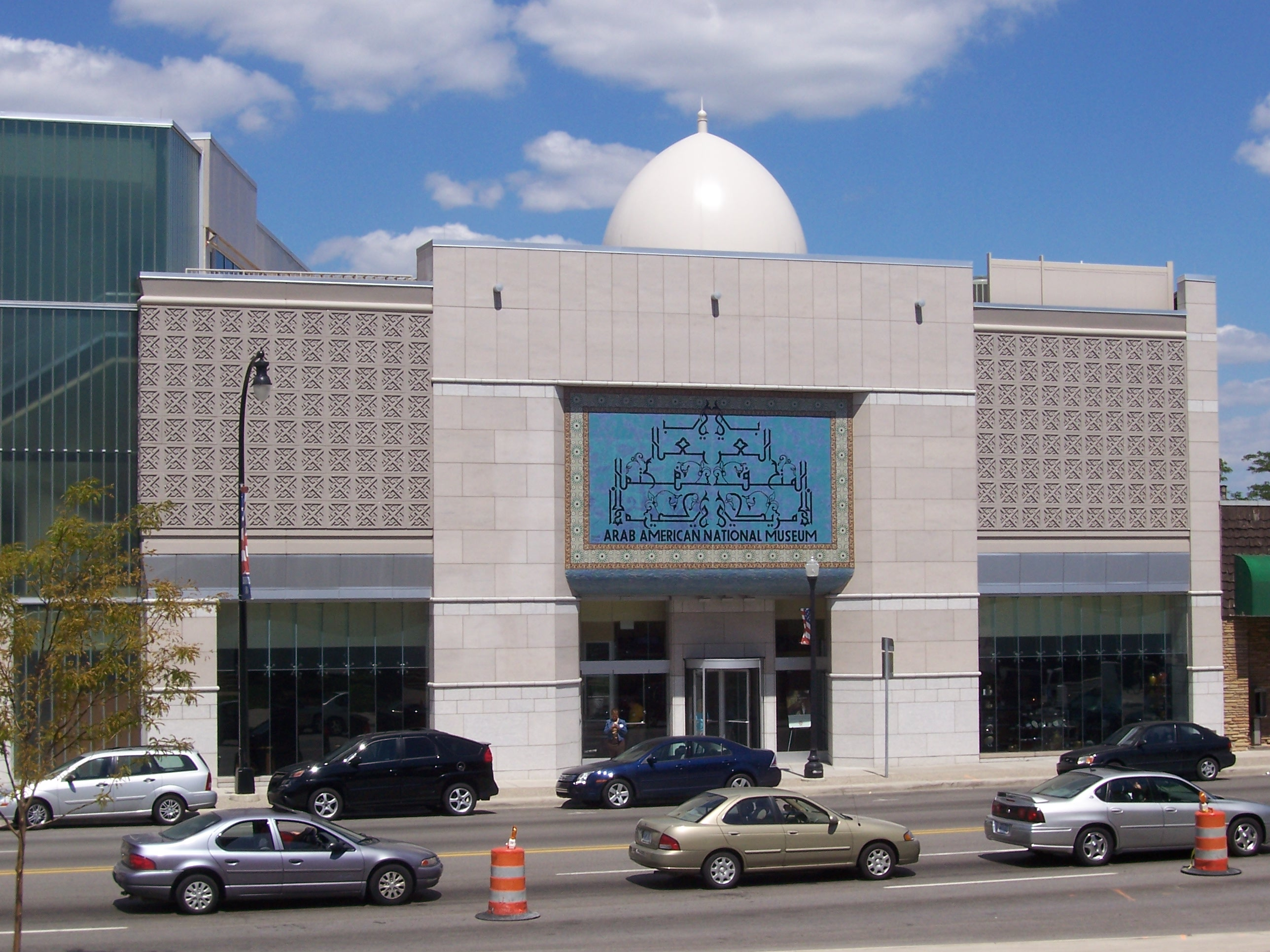
Arab American National Museum in Dearborn

By 2007 Metro Detroit, if defined as Wayne, Oakland, Macomb, and Washtenaw counties, had the United States's largest Arab American population, larger than that of Greater Los Angeles if that region was defined as Los Angeles, Orange, and Ventura counties. As of that year Arab Americans are one of the largest immigrant groups into Southeastern Michigan. The majority of Metro Detroit's Arabs are Lebanese, Palestinian, Iraqis, and Yemeni.

According to Jen'nan Ghazal Read of the U.S. Census Bureau, as of 2000, in the Wayne-Oakland-Macomb-Washtenaw region there were 96,363 persons of Arab ancestry, of whom 92,122 people lived in Wayne, Oakland, or Macomb counties; these made up 79.2% of Michigan residents of Arab ancestry. According to Read, within the Wayne-Oakland-Macomb-Washtenaw region there were 131,650 persons of Arab ancestry in 2004. The largest number of Arab Americans in the Metro Detroit area live in Wayne County. As of 2004 religions among Arab Americans in Detroit include the faiths of Islam and Christianity, with Christian varieties including Maronite, Melkite, Greek Orthodox, and Syriac Orthodox beliefs. The Muslim branches of Sunni and Shia beliefs are present in Metro Detroit. Jordanians and Palestinians in Metro Detroit include believers of Sunni Islam, Catholic, Protestant, and Greek Orthodox Christian beliefs. Yemeni and Iraqi people include believers of the Shafi'i Sunni Muslim school of thought and the Zaidiyyah Shia Muslim school of thought. As of 2004 most recent Arab immigrants to Metro Detroit are Muslim. A 2007 Wayne State University study said that the Metro Detroit Arab American community produced $7.7 billion annually in earnings and salaries. Annually these businesses produced $500 million in taxes to the state.

=== Armenian American ===
Detroit housed an Armenian community. In 1951 there were about 15,000 Armenians in Metro Detroit. In 1900 the first Armenians arrived in Detroit. In 1920 the peak immigration occurred. Initially almost all of the Armenian population consisted of young men. Today, Detroit has an estimated 60,000 Armenians, who are mostly gathered in Dearborn, West Bloomfield, Farmington Hills, Southfield, and Livonia. A statue of Komitas stands on Jefferson Avenue, in Detroit, and there are four Armenian churches in the Detroit area – St. John (Surp Hovaness) Armenian Apostolic Church, St. Sarkis (Surp Sarkis) Armenian Apostolic Church, St. Vartan Armenian Catholic Church, and the Armenian Congregational Church. There is also an Armenian school, AGBU Alex and Marie Manoogian School, in Southfield.

=== Assyrian American ===
By 2004, the Metro Detroit area was home to the largest Assyrian community in the diaspora. Most Chaldo-Assyrians who had emigrated to Metro Detroit originate from northern Iraq, although some originate from northwestern Iran, northeastern Syria, and southeastern Turkey. Often when immigrating, Assyrians in Detroit were employed in business, grocery, and market management. However, in modern times, many in the younger generations are looking to enter more advanced fields such as medicine and engineering. Most of the Assyrians in Detroit often identify as Chaldean, due to being members of the Chaldean Catholic Church, as well as a general lack of knowledge on the larger Assyrian community elsewhere and history.

According to the US census of 2007, there were 32,322 Assyrians in the Wayne, Macomb, Oakland, and Washtenaw four-county region of Michigan. The publication "Arab, Chaldean, and Middle Eastern Children and Families in the Tri-County Area" of the From a Child's Perspective: Detroit Metropolitan Census 2000 Fact Sheets Series states that "Many Chaldeans believe they have a unique ethnic identity other than Arab and wish not to be considered part of the Arab population.” As of 2004, Chaldean Catholic Assyrians in Wayne, Oakland, and Macomb counties make up 94% of the Assyrian population of the State of Michigan.

=== Coptic American ===
As of 2008 about 3,000 Egyptian Copts lived in the state of Michigan, mainly in Metro Detroit. Many Copts do not consider themselves Arab and see themselves as being the descendants of ancient Egyptians, while anthropologists classify them as Arabs due to cultural and linguistic features.

St. Mark Coptic Orthodox Church in Troy is the religious center of the Copts. Pope Shenouda III laid the first cornerstone of the church. Construction began on May 1, 1977 and was completed in May 1979, with the first Holy Communion on May 8 of that year and consecration in 1981, from June 12 through June 14. The Coptic community is scattered across Metro Detroit, with many living far away from the church. Some members of the church live in northern Ohio.

== Asian Americans ==
From 2000 to 2010, the Asian American population combined of Wayne, Oakland, and Macomb counties increased by 37%. As of 2010, almost half of the Asian Americans in the three county area live in Oakland County. According to Sarah Swider, a sociologist from Wayne State University who specializes in gender issues, labor relations, and immigration from Asia, the increase in the Asian population in the Detroit area is due to Asian Americans leaving traditional immigration gateway cities such as Los Angeles, New York City, and Washington DC, and settling in areas with high-tech job opportunities and lower costs of living.

According to the 2000 U.S. census, there were 103,054 people of Asian origin living in the Detroit PMSA. Kurt Metzger and Jason Booza, authors of "Asians in the United States, Michigan and Metropolitan Detroit", that "The distribution of Asians in the tri-county resembles a crescent shape that stretches from western Sterling Heights, on the east, to Canton Township (on the west) with pockets in Detroit, Hamtramck, Warren and Inkster".

As of 2002, 49% of the Asian origin people in the Wayne County-Macomb County-Oakland County tri-county area live in Oakland County. As of that year the cities in Oakland County with high concentrations of Asians included Bloomfield Hills, Bloomfield Township, Farmington Hills, Novi, Rochester Hills, and Troy. Within Wayne County, Detroit and Canton Township have large Asian populations. Within Macomb County, Sterling Heights and Warren have large Asian populations. Between 1990 and 2000 the Asian racial population in the tri-county area increased by 46,016, an 83% increase, making it the fastest-growing racial group in the tri-county area. In that figure, Oakland County had the largest population increase.

As of 2002, most Asians in the tri-county area, particularly ethnic Indians, Japanese, and Chinese, live in newer, wealthier suburbs mostly populated by white people. As of that year, many smaller Asian populations such as Bangladeshi, Vietnamese, and Lao people settle in different areas.

=== History of Asians ===
In 1872, the first Chinese person came to Detroit and further Chinese people established restaurants and businesses. The Immigration Act of 1965 had increased Asian settlement into Metro Detroit, with immigrants from South Asia, China, Korea, and the Philippines. Many of the immigrants who arrived after the act were doctors, engineers, nurses, and scientists because the post-1965 immigration policies favored educated professionals. Many educated professionals from Asia who had obtained PhDs began working for the "Big Three" U.S. carmakers.

Helen Zia, author of Asian American Dreams: The Emergence of an American People wrote that, due to the anti-Japanese sentiment in Metro Detroit in the early 1980s, "it felt dangerous to have an Asian face." In 1982, in Metro Detroit autoworkers killed Vincent Chin, a Chinese American mistaken as a Japanese American. An October 27, 2009, article by the Detroit Free Press stated that "It took the slaying of ... Vincent Chin by a disgruntled autoworker in 1982 to awaken Detroit of the ugliness and danger of anti-Asian racism." Charles Kaufman, the judge, gave probation and fines to the two men who pleaded guilty to Chin's murder. Zia wrote that the sentences given to the killers made Asian Americans believe that the community perceived them as having little worth. Zia wrote that Asians in Metro Detroit reacted by no longer taken disrespect towards their community that they had previously endured.

168 Asian Mart, a 38,000-square-foot (3,500 m^{2}) supermarket, is the largest Asian supermarket in southeast Michigan, and one of the largest in the state. the store, owned by Ricky and Cindy Dong of Troy, opened on June 1, 2015. Ricky Dong originated from Fuzhou, Fujian, China.

=== Bangladeshi American ===
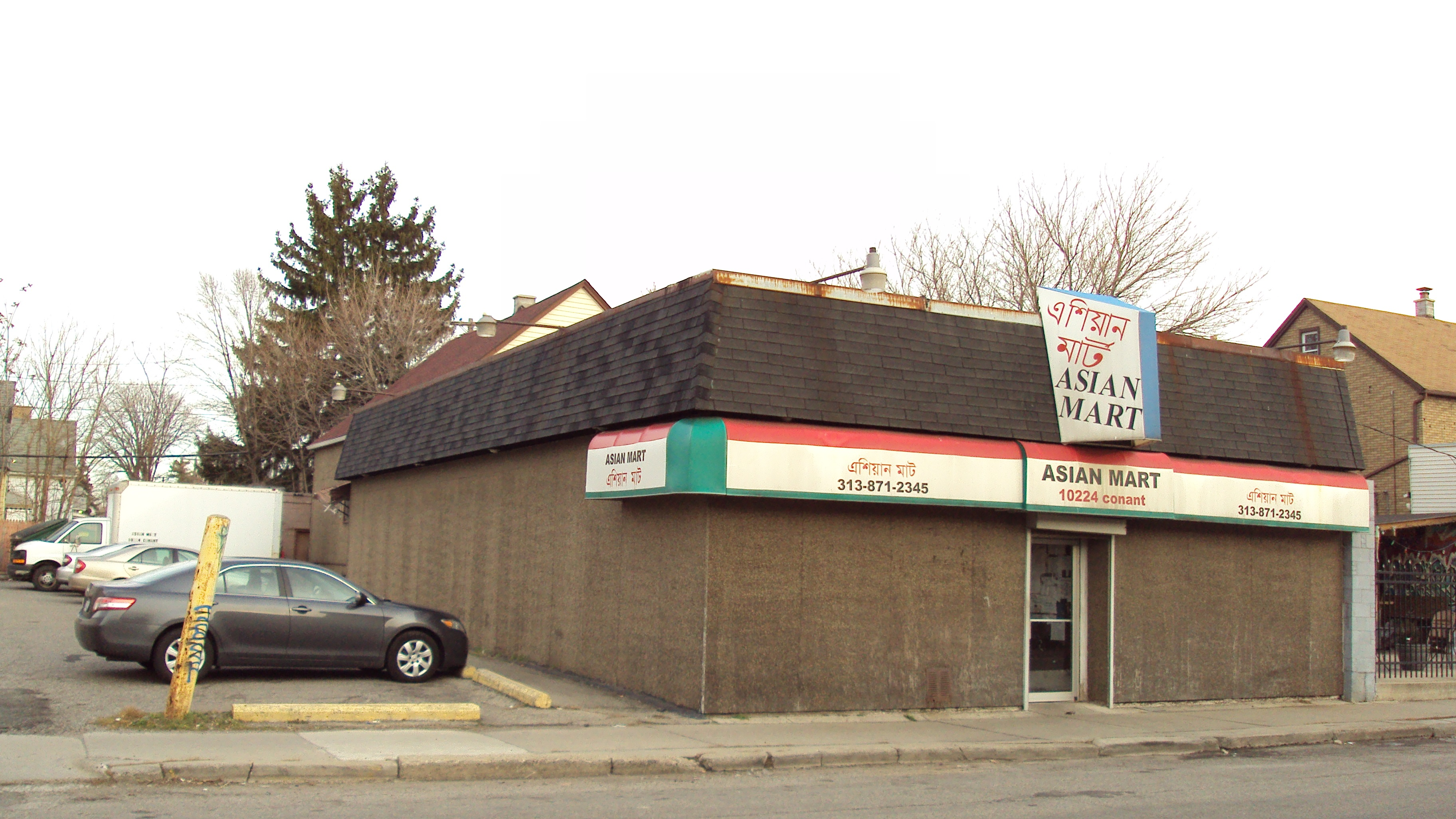
Asian Mart (Bengali: এশিয়ান মার্ট), a Bengali food shop in Hamtramck

By 2001, many Bangladeshi Americans had moved from New York City, particularly Astoria, Queens, to the Hamtramck and the east side of Detroit. As of 2002 there were 1,790 people in the Wayne-Macomb-Oakland tricounty area with origins from Pakistan. In 2002 over 80% of the Bangladeshi population within Wayne, Oakland, and Macomb counties lived in Hamtramck and some surrounding neighborhoods in Detroit. That area overall had almost 1,500 ethnic Bangladeshis, almost 75% of Bangladeshis in the entire State of Michigan. Detroit Public Schools stated that the Detroit International Academy for Young Women has a "strong tie to the Bangladeshi community." DPS's sole Bangladeshi teacher certified in English as a second language teaches at Davison Elementary-Middle School.

=== Chinese American ===
As of 2002, Ethnic Chinese and Chinese American people are second largest Asian-origin ethnic group in the Wayne-Macomb-Oakland tri-county area. As of that year there were 16,829 ethnic Chinese, concentrated mainly in Troy, Rochester Hills, and Canton Township. As of 2012 Madison Heights also hosts a significant Chinese community. As of that year the largest still-operating Chinatown in proximity to Metro Detroit is located in the Chinatown of Windsor, Ontario.

=== Filipino American ===
As of 2002, the third largest group consisted of Filipino people, with 12,085 in the Wayne-Macomb-Oakland tri-county area. Filipinos first came to the area in the 1900s from West Coast and a large number came in the 1960s after a political crisis occurred in the Philippines.

=== Hmong American ===
As of 2007, most Hmong people in the State of Michigan live in northeastern Detroit, but they have been increasingly moving to Pontiac and Warren.

=== Indian American ===
A 2013 report by the Global Detroit and Data Driven Detroit stated that of the immigrant ethnic groups to Metro Detroit, the largest segment is the Indian population. As of 2012, the Indian populations of Farmington Hills and Troy are among the twenty largest Indian communities in the United States.

=== Japanese American ===
In 2002, there were 6,413 people of Japanese origin, including Japanese citizens and Japanese Americans, in the tri-county area, making them the fifth largest Asian ethnic group. As of that year, within an area stretching from Sterling Heights to Canton Township in the shape of a crescent, most of the ethnic Japanese lived in the center. As of 2002 the largest populations of ethnic Japanese people were located in Novi and West Bloomfield Township. As of April 2013, the largest Japanese national population in the State of Michigan is in Novi, with 2,666 Japanese residents. West Bloomfield had the third largest Japanese population and Farmington Hills had the fourth largest Japanese population. Many Japanese companies operate offices in Metro Detroit.

=== Korean American ===
As of 2002, ethnic Korean and Korean Americans made up the fourth largest group, with 8,452 people. In 1910 Detroit received its first Korean person. As of 1951 Koreans as a group did not attend any particular church. Albert Meyer, the author of Ethnic groups in Detroit, 1951, wrote in 1951 that "it has been impossible to identify any peak periods of their immigration" due to the small size of the ethnic group at the time. Mayer reported that there was no specific Korean media and that the group members "assimulated [sic] rapidly" Most of the Koreans arrived in the U.S. after the Korean War, and Metzger and Booza wrote that compared to other ethnic groups, Koreans are "relatively new to the tri-county area". Most Koreans in the area live in Oakland County, particularly Troy.

=== Pakistani American ===
As of 2002, there were 3,416 people in the Wayne-Macomb-Oakland tricounty area with origins from Pakistan. Most of them live in Wayne County. Their main concentrations are in Canton Township, Brownstown Township, Detroit, Dearborn, and Hamtramck.

=== Vietnamese American ===
In 2002, there were 4,500 Vietnamese people in the tri-county area. Sterling Heights and Warren had larger populations and there was a smaller number of Vietnamese in Southwest Detroit. Kurt Metzger and Jason Booza, authors of "Asians in the United States, Michigan and Metropolitan Detroit", wrote in 2002 that "The tri-county's Vietnamese population shares a population pattern similar to that of Filipinos." By 2009, there was a large number of Vietnamese businesses in Madison Heights. The Roman Catholic Archdiocese of Detroit operates the Our Lady of Grace Vietnamese Parish (Vietnamese: Gx Đức Mẹ Ban Ơn Lành) in Warren. Our Lady of Grace was previously in Eastpointe, but moved to Warren in 2012 when it merged with St. Cletus Church.

== Hispanic Americans ==
As of 2004, in the State of Michigan many Latino people were fourth and fifth generation and had moved from the Southwestern United States.

In 2004 58.5% of the Latinos in the Wayne County-Macomb County-Oakland County tri-county area were Mexicans. 9.6% were Puerto Ricans, 4.8% were Central Americans, 3.8% were South Americans, 3.5% were Cubans, and 2.2% were Dominicans. 17.3% checked the Latino box in the census survey without indicating any further detail so they were classified as "all other Latinos".

As of 2004, within the metropolitan area the major concentration of Latinos is in Mexicantown, Detroit. That year, Wayne County had 77,207 Latinos, the largest number of Latinos in any Michigan county, with 61% of them living in Detroit. Of the Latinos, 53,538 were Mexican, 9,036 were Puerto Rican, and 1,595 were Cuban. In Michigan Wayne County has the highest numbers of Mexicans, Puerto Ricans, and Cubans. In 2004, Oakland County had 28,999 Latinos, with 8,463 (29%) of them living in the City of Pontiac. 54.3% of Latinos in Oakland County of age 25 and older completed higher education, the highest such percentage in the tri-county area. In 2004, Macomb County had 12,435, with Warren having the largest number of Latinos in the county. 62.5% of Macomb County's Latinos were of Mexican origin.

=== Mexican American ===
In 1910 the State of Michigan had fewer than 100 Mexicans. In the 20th century the original Mexicans arriving in Detroit came from the central portion of Mexico. Mexicans moved to Detroit to get industrial jobs, including Henry Ford's $5 per day jobs. The community of Mexicantown, originally known as "La Bagley", was established to provide Mexican-oriented goods and services. Historians estimated that in reality Detroit alone had over 4,000 Mexicans even though the U.S. Census of 1920 only counted 1,268 Mexicans in the entire state. In 1951 in Detroit there were about 15,000 to 17,000 U.S.-born ethnic Mexicans and 12,000 Mexican-born residents.

== Native Americans ==
30,000 Native Americans reside in the Detroit area. Anybody Killa and Charlie Hill, rappers and actors respectively, are both Detroit-born Native American entertainers.

== See also ==
- Demographics of Metro Detroit
