= Error of impunity =

Insufficient punishment of criminals

An error of impunity is a lapse in the justice system that results in criminals either remaining at large or receiving sanctions that are below a socially optimal level. The term is used in Brian Forst's book Errors of Justice and in Robert Bohm's introduction to a special edition of The Journal of Criminal Justice on miscarriages of justice. If convicting an innocent person, called a miscarriage of justice, is a Type I error for falsely identifying culpability (a "false positive"), then an error of impunity would be a Type II error of failing to find a culpable person guilty (a "false negative").

== Definition ==
Forst divides errors of impunity into two categories.

The first category consists of those that are like car accidents: the community may be able to do more to prevent them, but generally prefers to consider that doing so is beyond the reach of the criminal justice system. About half of all felony victimizations in the U.S. are not reported to the police, and many of those that are reported are committed by skillful, elusive offenders.

The second category consists of those errors that are real, unambiguous, significant, and avoidable. Examples include failures of the police to follow up leads to capture dangerous offenders and inmate escapees.

== Causes ==
Errors of impunity can be caused in much the same ways as miscarriages of justice can, including, without limitation, the following:

- A skilled defense lawyer might be able to exploit a legal technicality in order to have crucial evidence ruled inadmissible.
- A skilled defense lawyer can make an otherwise credible witness lose his or her credibility by making the witness appear mentally incompetent in other aspects of his or her daily life (e.g. a person with autism might be labeled as mentally insane due to their neurological disorder, therefore questioning if the witness was having hallucinations).
- A type of legal immunity, such as diplomatic immunity or sovereign immunity.
- Corrupt judges, or detectives or other police officers, who can be bribed.

== Effects ==
Forst argues that a variety of social costs are incurred as the number of culpable offenders set free increases: public safety and the quality of life are compromised, the credibility of deterrent effectiveness is lost, and citizens become increasingly inclined to perceive injustices to victims and alienation from the police and courts, if not from government generally. As a result, Forst argues, the integrity of the justice system becomes threatened both by the reality and perception of ineffectualness. These lapses can run through the entire justice system, from ineffective policing and prosecution to weak sentencing and corrections.

== Notable cases ==
- John Bodkin Adams was a British general practitioner working in Eastbourne, UK. He was arrested in 1956 for the murders of Edith Alice Morrell and Gertrude Hullett. He was tried in 1957 and found not guilty of the first charge and the second was dropped via a nolle prosequi, an act which the judge, Mr Justice Devlin, later described as "an abuse of process". Police archives, opened in 2003, suggest that evidence was passed to the defence by the DPP in order to allow Adams to avoid the death sentence, then still in force. Home Office pathologist Francis Camps suspected Adams of killing 163 patients in total. Adams was only ever fined for minor offences and struck off the medical register for four years.
- Karla Homolka was granted immunity in exchange for her testimony against her lover Paul Bernardo for his murders. She portrayed herself as an abused victim, but later evidence proved she was in fact equally culpable, taking part in the murders, but Canadian authorities were unable to prosecute.
- Ronald Ebens, with his stepson Michael Nitz, viciously beat Vincent Chin in the head with a baseball bat, on June 19, 1982. On March 16, 1983, after a plea bargain was reached the previous month to reduce the charge to third-degree manslaughter (which had no minimum sentence and could be dealt with by probation), Judge Charles Kaufman sentenced Ebens and Nitz to three years probation and $3,720 in fines and court costs for the murder of Vincent Chin. Kaufman cited the defendants' clean prior criminal records and that there was no minimum sentence for a manslaughter plea as he said: "These weren't the kind of men you send to jail... You don't make the punishment fit the crime; you make the punishment fit the criminal." Citing the judge's POW record as one of several reasons to invalidate the lenient sentence in favor of a more stringent punishment, advocacy groups unsuccessfully tried to vacate the original sentence. Kaufman's sentence was upheld as valid and final, due to the Fifth Amendment protection against double jeopardy.
- John Wilson, a Scottish football fan, was filmed during a game attacking Celtic manager Neil Lennon. He admitted the charge in court but the jury acquitted him of assault and convicted him of merely of breaching the peace. According to the Guardian, it was "one of the few occasions in Scottish legal history when an individual is acquitted of a crime that he freely admitted carrying out. A joke rapidly emerged that Muammar Gaddafi had offered to surrender to NATO if he could be guaranteed a trial in Edinburgh."

== See also ==
- Crime victim advocacy program
- Miscarriage of justice
- Right to an effective remedy
- Victims' rights
