= Lily Chin =

Chinese-American activist (1920–2002)

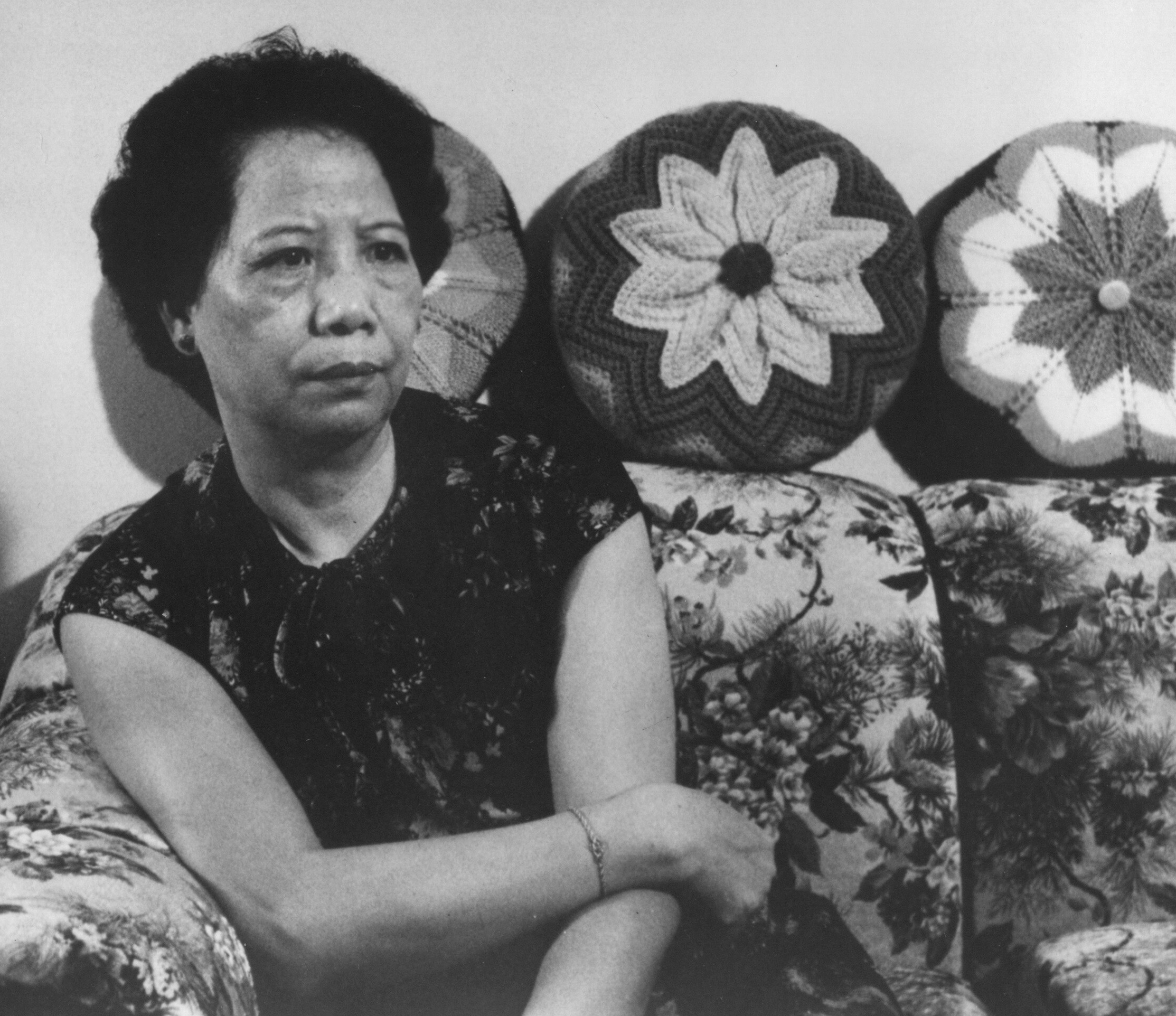
- Chin in 1985
- Born: June 18, 1920; Heping, Guangdong, China
- Died: June 9, 2002 (aged 81); Farmington Hills, Michigan, U.S.
- Known for: Activism for Asian-American rights

Lily Chin (née Yee; Chinese: 陈余琼芳; June 18, 1920 – June 9, 2002) was a Chinese-American activist known for her attempts to seek legal proceedings for the death of her adopted son, Vincent Chin.

== Early life ==
Lily Yee was born in Heping, China, on June 18, 1920, to a prosperous merchant. She emigrated to the United States in 1948 after marrying Bing Hing “David” Chin (a.k.a. C.W. Hing). After Lily suffered a miscarriage in 1949 and was unable to have children, the couple adopted Vincent from a Chinese orphanage in 1961.

== Death of Vincent Chin ==
In the 1980s, the popularity of Japanese automobiles in the United States led to job losses and anti-Japanese sentiments among Americans.

About to be married in a week, Vincent Chin celebrated his bachelor's party at a bar in Detroit with his friends on June 19, 1982. Ronald Ebens and his stepson Michael Nitz, two unemployed Caucasian auto workers in the bar, thought Chin was Japanese and an altercation ensued. They blamed him for the layoffs in the American auto industry and said racial slurs to him.

When Ebens and Nitz left the club, they encountered Chin and his friends who were waiting outside for Siroskey. Chin called Ebens a "chicken shit", at which point Nitz retrieved a baseball bat from his car and Chin and his friends ran down the street. Ebens and Nitz searched the neighborhood for 20 to 30 minutes and even paid another man 20 dollars to help them look for Chin, before finding him at a nearby McDonald's restaurant. Chin attempted to escape, but was held by Nitz while Ebens repeatedly bludgeoned Chin with a baseball bat until Chin's head cracked open. Ebens was arrested and taken into custody at the scene of the crime by two off-duty police officers who had witnessed the beating. One of the officers said that Ebens wielded the bat like he was swinging "for a home run". Michael Gardenhire, one of the police officers, called for an ambulance. Chin was rushed to Henry Ford Hospital and was comatose on arrival. He never regained consciousness and died four days later on June 23, 1982; Chin was only 27 years old.

== Activism ==
Ebens and Nitz were found guilty, but only received probation and a $3,000 fine.

The leniency of the sentence sparked outrage among Asian-Americans. Chin spoke across the United States in rallies and demonstrations. With Chin as their moral conscience, a civil rights movement formed among Asian-Americans to seek a trial against the two killers, which resulted in the federal government pursuing a civil rights trial for an Asian-American for the first time.

The 1984 federal civil rights case against the men found Ebens guilty of the second count and sentenced him to 25 years in prison while Nitz was acquitted of both counts. Ebens' conviction was overturned in 1986.

A civil suit against Ebens and Nitz settled out-of-court. Nitz was ordered to pay $50,000 to Chin's family while Ebens was ordered to pay $1.5 million, but the latter stopped making payments in 1989.

Chin's role in the movement was documented in the movie Who Killed Vincent Chin?, an Academy Award nominee.

Chin established a scholarship in Vincent's memory, to be administered by the Americans for American Citizens for Justice.

== Death ==
After Ebens' acquittal, Chin returned to her hometown in Guangdong, China, in September 1987, reportedly to avoid being reminded of her son's death. She was diagnosed with cancer in 2001 and returned to Michigan for treatment. On June 9, 2002, Chin died in Farmington Hills, Michigan; she was 81 years old. Chin was buried in Detroit with her husband and son.

== Sources ==
Kich, Martin (2019). "The Murder of Vincent Chin, 1982". In Dong, Lan (ed.). 25 Events that Shaped Asian American History: An Encyclopedia of the American Mosaic. Santa Barbara, Calif.: Greenwood Press. p. 374. ISBN 978-1-4408-6089-8.
