= Vincent Who? =

- Poster for Vincent Who?
- Release date: 2009

Vincent Who? is a documentary film that was released in 2009. It details the 1982 murder of Vincent Chin that occurred in Detroit, Michigan.

Chin was a 27-year-old Chinese-American who was beaten to death with a baseball bat by two Detroit autoworkers, who had mistakenly thought that he was Japanese and, in their minds, was responsible for the loss of jobs in the U.S. auto industry.

As part of making the film, producer Curtis Chin (who is not related to Vincent Chin) asked approximately 80 young Asian Americans if they had ever heard of Vincent Chin — they hadn't.

The film begins by explaining that Chin's killers, Ronald Ebens and Michael Nitz, were originally charged with second-degree murder but were allowed to plead guilty to a lesser charge of manslaughter. Judge Charles Kaufman, who sentenced them to three years' probation and a $3,000 fine, explained his leniency by saying, "These weren't the kind of men you send to jail."

The National Association for Multicultural Education gave Vincent Who? its 2009 Multicultural Media Award.

== See also ==
- Who Killed Vincent Chin?, 1987 documentary about the same case.
