= Christine Choy =

Chinese-American filmmaker (1952–2025)

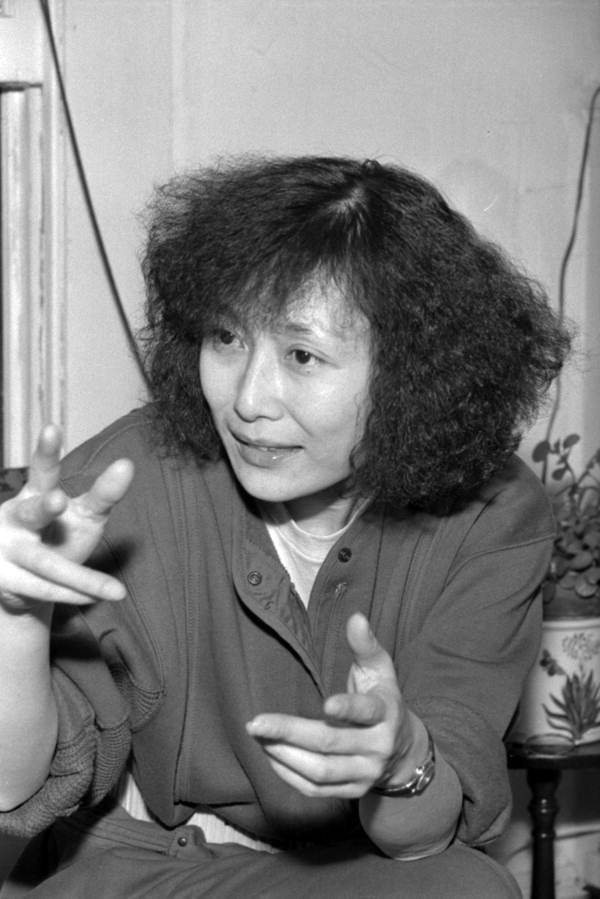
- Choy in 1986
- Born: Chai Ming Huei; September 17, 1949 (Note: When Choy died, some sources gave her age at death as 73, while others said she was 76. The New York Times reported a full date of birth as September 17, 1949. The dates of events occurring after she moved to the United States at age fourteen, such as enrolling at Manhattanville College in 1965, are compatible with the earlier birth year.); Shanghai, China
- Died: December 7, 2025 (aged 76); New York City, U.S.
- Education: Manhattanville College
- Occupations: Filmmaker, director, documentarian, journalist, activist
- Known for: Who Killed Vincent Chin? (1988)
- Political party: Black Panther Party
- Spouse: Allan Siegel (m. 1979, divorced)
- Children: 3
- Awards: Academy Award for Best Documentary - Nominated (1989), "Who Killed Vincent Chin?"

Chinese name
- Chinese: 崔明慧
Transcriptions
Standard Mandarin
- Hanyu Pinyin: Cuī Mínghuì

Korean name
- Hangul: 최명혜
- RR: Choe Myeonghye
- MR: Ch'oe Myŏnghye

Christine Choy (born Chai Ming Huei; September 17, 1949 – December 7, 2025) was a Chinese American filmmaker. She was known for co-directing Who Killed Vincent Chin?, a 1988 documentary film based on the killing of Vincent Chin, for which she was nominated for an Academy Award. She co-founded Third World Newsreel, a film company focusing on people of color and social justice issues, as well as Asian CineVision, a development and exhibition space for Asian/Asian American filmmakers. As a documentary filmmaker, she produced and directed more than eighty films. She was a professor at New York University's Tisch School of the Arts. She was the first Asian American feature-length documentary filmmaker with her first film preceding both “the godmother of Asian American cinema” Loni Ding’s first film by ten years and “godfather” Robert A Nakamura’s 1975 film Wataridori: Birds of Passage.

== Early life ==
=== Life in Asia ===
Choy was born in Shanghai in the People's Republic of China as Chai Ming Huei to a Korean father and a Chinese mother. Shortly after Choy's birth, her father abandoned the family to return to South Korea. As a result, Choy was raised largely by her mother. Growing up, her family struggled greatly financially.

Following the Cultural Revolution, the family fled mainland China via Hong Kong. They moved to South Korea, where Choy was reunited with her father. During this time, Choy developed a strong appreciation for American films released in South Korea. Although she enjoyed the films, Choy became attuned to the prevalence of casual discrimination towards Asian people in American media.

=== Arrival in America and Education ===
Choy moved to New York City at the age of 14. She was a volunteer for WBAI in high school and described "[o]ne of her duties" as covering the Panther Twenty-One trial at the Tombs. During the trial she earned the trust of the Black Panther Party, and soon afterwards began doing errands for the New York City chapter.

Choy referred to herself as a "Panther Youth", and said she "did the running around for the big shots."

In 1965, Choy was given a scholarship to attend Manhattanville College of the Sacred Heart in New York, where she studied architecture. While attending, she made friends with a group of hippies that were a part of Newsreel. At Newsreel, Choy worked as an editor and animation director. Soon thereafter, Choy earned a Directing Certificate at the American Film Institute.

=== Filmmaking ===
Choy has received a Guggenheim Fellowship, a Rockefeller Memorial Fellowship, and an Asian Cultural Council Fellowship. Her documentary film Who Killed Vincent Chin? received a nomination for the Academy Award for Best Documentary Feature in 1989. In 2021, the film was registered in the National Film Registry.

== Career ==
In 1972, Choy co-founded Third World Newsreel together with fellow filmmaker Susan Robeson. During her tenure, Choy directed documentary films on the 1971 Attica prison uprising, the life of women in United States prisons, and the history of social activism in New York City's chinatown, as well as documentaries on the division of the Korean peninsula and Namibia's struggle for independence from South Africa, among others.

In 1974, Choy directed her first feature-length documentary, Teach Our Children. As Choy related to the poverty and the migration issues that people around her faced, she was inspired to make a second documentary, combining the issues she faced in China and South Korea with the struggles she faced in the United States. The finished film, From Spikes to Spindles, was released in 1976, and focused on Chinese migration and Chinese citizens' struggle for equal treatment in America.

In 1975, she co-founded AsianCineVision alongside fellow grassroot media activists Peter Chow, Danny Yung, and Thomas Tam in Tsui Hark’s loft in Manhattan Chinatown. Under the original banner CCTV (Chinese Cable Television), the non-profit focused on training Chinatown locals to tell their own stories through Chinese-language news segments. The shift towards promoting and preserving Asian and Asian American media expressions came in 1978, when they launched the Asian American International Film Festival. AAIFF became the first festival in the country devoted to showcasing works by and about Asian Americans.

Choy was one of the first major female Chinese-American filmmakers. She is frequently painted as a controversial figure. She is considered a political filmmaker and an activist.

One of Choy's most acclaimed films, Who Killed Vincent Chin? (1988), was co-directed with Renee Tajima. The film tells the story of Vincent Jen Chin, a Chinese-American man who was beaten to death with a baseball bat by Ron Ebens and his stepson, Michael Nitz, who held Chin defenseless. They were each sentenced to 3 years probation and a $3,000 fine. Choy struggled in seeking funding for the film due to its high-tension subject matter, shedding light on working-class racism in Detroit at a time when the US auto industry was failing and Japanese cars were gaining popularity. The film was a pioneer in reconfiguring ethnographic filmmaking and won several accolades.

At the 1989 Sundance Film Festival while there to promote her film Who Killed Vincent Chin?, Choy shared lodging with Steven Soderbergh, who was in Park City premiering Sex, Lies, and Videotape. Also at the '89 Festival, she confronted Robert Redford about Sundance's lack of diversity. Who Killed Vincent Chin? was nominated for the Grand Jury documentary award at the Festival; and went on to win a Peabody Award in 1990.

Sa-I-gu (1993), another film that Choy co-directed, was about the effect of the 1992 Los Angeles riots on the Korean American community there, and directly deals with the racial animosity towards Asians in America, but more specifically Asian women.

After decades of directing in the documentary industry, Choy became a professor at Tisch School of Arts in New York City. She has taught a section of the production course "Sight & Sound Documentary" for several years. She also instructed a course called "Directing the Thesis" to third-year students. Choy also has teaching experience at Yale, Cornell, Buffalo State University of New York, and City University in Hong Kong.

In her time teaching she has mentored many filmmakers, with her list of protégés including Todd Phillips, Raoul Peck, and Brett Morgen.

In 2021, Who Killed Vincent Chin? was inducted into the Library of Congress' National Film Registry. It had recently been restored by the Academy Film Archive and The Film Foundation to mark the 40th anniversary of Chin's death. At the time there had been a recent surge in hate crimes against Asian Americans amid the COVID-19 pandemic.

== Personal life and death ==
In 1979, Choy married fellow filmmaker Allan Siegel. They had one child together, a daughter and a step-son from Allan's previous relationship. Choy later had another son from a different relationship. Choy lived in Manhattan.

Choy died from cancer under hospice care at Calvary hospital in the Bronx, New York, on December 7, 2025.

== Awards ==
- 1988, Won: Who Killed Vincent Chin? - Best Documentary, Hawaii International Film Festival
- 1988, Won: Who Killed Vincent Chin? - IDA Award, International Documentary Association
- 1989, Won: Who Killed Vincent Chin? - Asian Media Award
- 1989, Nominated: Who Killed Vincent Chin? - Cinematography Award, Sundance Film Festival
- 1989, Nominated: Who Killed Vincent Chin? - Grand Jury Prize, Documentary Feature, Sundance Film Festival
- 1989, Nominated: Who Killed Vincent Chin? - Academy Award for Best Documentary Feature
- 1997, Won: My America...or Honk If You Love Buddha - Cinematography Award, Sundance Film Festival
- 1998, Won: The Shot Heard 'Round the World, Jury Award, Bangkok Film Festival
- 2008, Won: "Long Story Short" - Audience Award, Documentary Feature, VC FilmFest - Los Angeles Asian Pacific Film Festival
- 2008, Won: "Long Story Short" - Honorable Mention, Documentary Feature, VC FilmFest - Los Angeles Asian Pacific Film Festival
- 2023, Won: Hot Docs' Outstanding Achievement Award

== Filmography ==
Year	Title	Director	Producer	Cinematographer	Writer	Notes	Ref.
1972	"Teach Our Children"	Yes	Yes	Yes		Co-director	
1974	Generation of a Railroad Spiker	Yes					
1975	Fresh Seeds in a Big Apple	Yes					
1976	From Spikes to Spindles	Yes					
1977	History of the Chinese Patriot Movement in the U.S.	Yes					
1977	North Country Tour	Yes					
1978	Inside Women Inside	Yes					
1978	Loose Pages Bound	Yes					
1978	A Dream Is What You Wake Up From	Yes					
1980	To Love, Honor, and Obey	Yes					
1981	White Flower Passing	Yes					
1982	"Bittersweet Survival" (Short film)	Yes	Yes*			*Executive Producer	
1982	Go Between	Yes					
1982–83	Mississippi Triangle	Yes					
1983	Fei Teir, Goddess in Flight	Yes					
1984	Namibia, Independence Now	Yes					
1985	Monkey King Looks West	Yes					
1986	"Permanent Wave" (Short film)	Yes					
1988	Shanhai Lil's	Yes					
1988	Who Killed Vincent Chin?	Yes	Yes			Nominated - Academy Award for Best Documentary, 1989	
1989	Best Hotel on Skid Row	Yes					
1989	Fortune Cookie: The Myth of the Model Minority	Yes					
1991	Homes Apart: Korea	Yes	Yes	Yes			
1993	"Sa-I-Gu" (Short film)	Yes	Yes	Yes			
1995	A Litany for Survival: The Life and Work of Audre Lorde			Yes			
1997	My America... or Honk If You Love Buddha			Yes			
1997	Wrongful Death: Hattori vs. Peairs	Yes					
1997	The Shot Heard Round The World	Yes	Yes	Yes	Yes	Winner - Best Documentary, Bangkok International Film Festival	
1998	In the Name of the Emperor	Yes		Yes			
1998	"Electric Shadow" (Short film)	Yes	Yes				
2001	Ha Ha Shanghai	Yes					
2003	Sparrow Village	Yes					
2007	No Fifth Grade	Yes					
2007	Miao Village Medicine	Yes					
2008	"Long Story Short" (Short film)	Yes	Yes				
2014	Ghina	Yes	Yes		Yes		
2016	"Rodney King: Koreatown Reacts" (Short film)	Yes	Yes				
2016	"ReOrienting Africa" (Short film)	Yes	Yes				
2016	"Legal Smuggling with Christine Choy" (Short film)				Yes		
2019	"The Architects of Camellia" (Short film)	Yes					

=== Acting performances and documentary appearances ===
Year	Title	Role / Self	Notes	Ref.
1993	Sa-I-Gu (Short film)	Self		
1994–2025	Asian America	Self	TV series	
2005	Marc Forster: Von Davos nach Hollywood	Self	TV movie	
2010	Cellar	Haeri	also Executive Producer	
2013	"Ego Death" (Short film)	Teacher		
2016	"Legal Smuggling with Christine Choy" (Short film)	Self (Voiceover)	Directed by Noah & Lewie Kloster; animated film	
2017	"Human Resources" (Short film)	Eileen		
2017	Scars of Nanking	Self	TV movie	
2022	The Exiles	Self	Directed by Violet Columbus & Ben Klein (former students at NYU); Winner - Grand Jury Prize, U.S. Documentary competition, 2022 Sundance Film Festival	
2022	"Who Killed Vincent Chin? Revisited" (Short film)	Self		
