= Emil Guillermo =

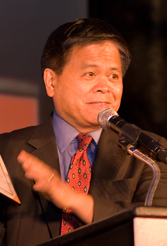
- Born: San Francisco, California, U.S.
- Occupation: journalist
- Notable credit(s): All Things Considered (NPR); "Emil Amok" (column); Amok: Essays from an Asian American Perspective (book)

Emil Guillermo is an American print and broadcast journalist, commentator and humorist. His column, "Emil Amok", appeared for more than 14 years in AsianWeek—at one time, the most widely read and largest circulating Asian American newsweekly in the U.S. The column has now migrated to the Asian American Legal Defense and Education Fund site blog. He is especially known for being the last press reporter to speak with Ronald Ebens about the death of Vincent Chin.

== Early life and education ==
Born in San Francisco, Guillermo is an alumnus of Harvard University, where he studied history and film, and was a member of the Harvard Lampoon. He delivered the Ivy Oration as class humorist in 1977.

== Career ==
From 1989 to 1991, he was host of NPR's All Things Considered. He was the first Asian American male, and first Filipino American, to host a regularly scheduled national news broadcast. He has also worked as a television reporter in San Francisco, Dallas, and Washington, D.C. He has hosted his own radio talk show in Washington D.C., San Francisco and Sacramento. His writing and commentary has been widely published in newspapers around the country, and has earned him national and regional journalism awards.

From 1995 to 2010, He wrote weekly "Emil Amok" columns in Asian Week.

In 2010, Guillermo began writing the blog for the Asian American Legal Defense and Education Fund.

In 2015, Guillermo received the Asian American Journalists Association's Dr. Suzanne Ahn Award for Civil Rights & Social Justice, in recognition of excellence in coverage of Asian American Pacific Islander civil rights and social justice issues,

He began performing a collection of monologues based on his life stories called "Amok Monologues." His first performance was in 2015 at The Marsh in San Francisco. In 2016, he began touring Fringe Festivals with his show, starting in 2016.

Guillermo is the author of Amok: Essays from an Asian American Perspective—a compilation of essays originally published in Asian Week—that won an American Book Award in 2000.

== Personal life ==
Emil Guillermo's cousin, 26-year-old Stephen Guillermo, was fatally shot in the Mission District in San Francisco on May 3, 2014. Stephen, who was drunk and unarmed, got off the elevator on the wrong floor of his apartment building and entered an apartment identical to his own but two floors below. He walked to the door that had the same number of his apartment, struggled with the doorknob, but managed to get inside. The 68-year-old male occupant of that apartment fired one shot that killed Stephen. The shooter claimed that he feared for his life from an intruder. He was initially booked for murder but was released two days later and prosecutors declined to file charges against him. Emil has expressed disapproval over the prosecutors' decision to not file charges.

== Bibliography ==
- Amok: Essays from an Asian American Perspective. San Francisco: AsianWeek Books/Monkey Tales Press, 1999. ISBN 0-9665020-1-9 ISBN 978-0966502015
