= Charles Kaufman =

Charles Kaufman may refer to:

- Charlie Kaufman (born 1958), American screenwriter, producer, and director
- Charles Kaufman (screenwriter) (1904–1991), American screenwriter
- Charles Kaufman (judge) (1920–2004), Michigan circuit court judge
- Charles Kaufman (educator) (1928–2016), American music educator
