= Asian American Dreams =

2000 book by Helen Zia

Asian American Dreams: The Emergence of an American People is a non-fiction book by Helen Zia, published in 2000 by Farrar, Straus and Giroux.

The book chronicles Zia's childhood in New Jersey and her interactions with American racial dynamics of the mid-20th century. Somini Gengupta of The New York Times stated that the book has a "polemical" tone and that it "is part memoir, part social history". It also discusses the murder of Vincent Chin and the 1992 Los Angeles riots.

== Content ==
Zia inserted stories of her life at the initial portions of every chapter.

In the introduction she comments on how Asian Americans were often not perceived as being Americans.

One event she recalled in a book is her black and white friends told her that she was in a racial binary and needed to select which side - white or black - she would identify with.

== Reception ==
Publishers Weekly stated that the work as a "fresh perspective".

Kirkus Reviews stated that overall the work is "Evenhanded, subtle, and engaging" though it argued that Zia's recollections, compared to similar ones of her panethnic category, were "less compelling".
