= Helen Zia =

Chinese-American journalist and activist

- 謝漢蘭
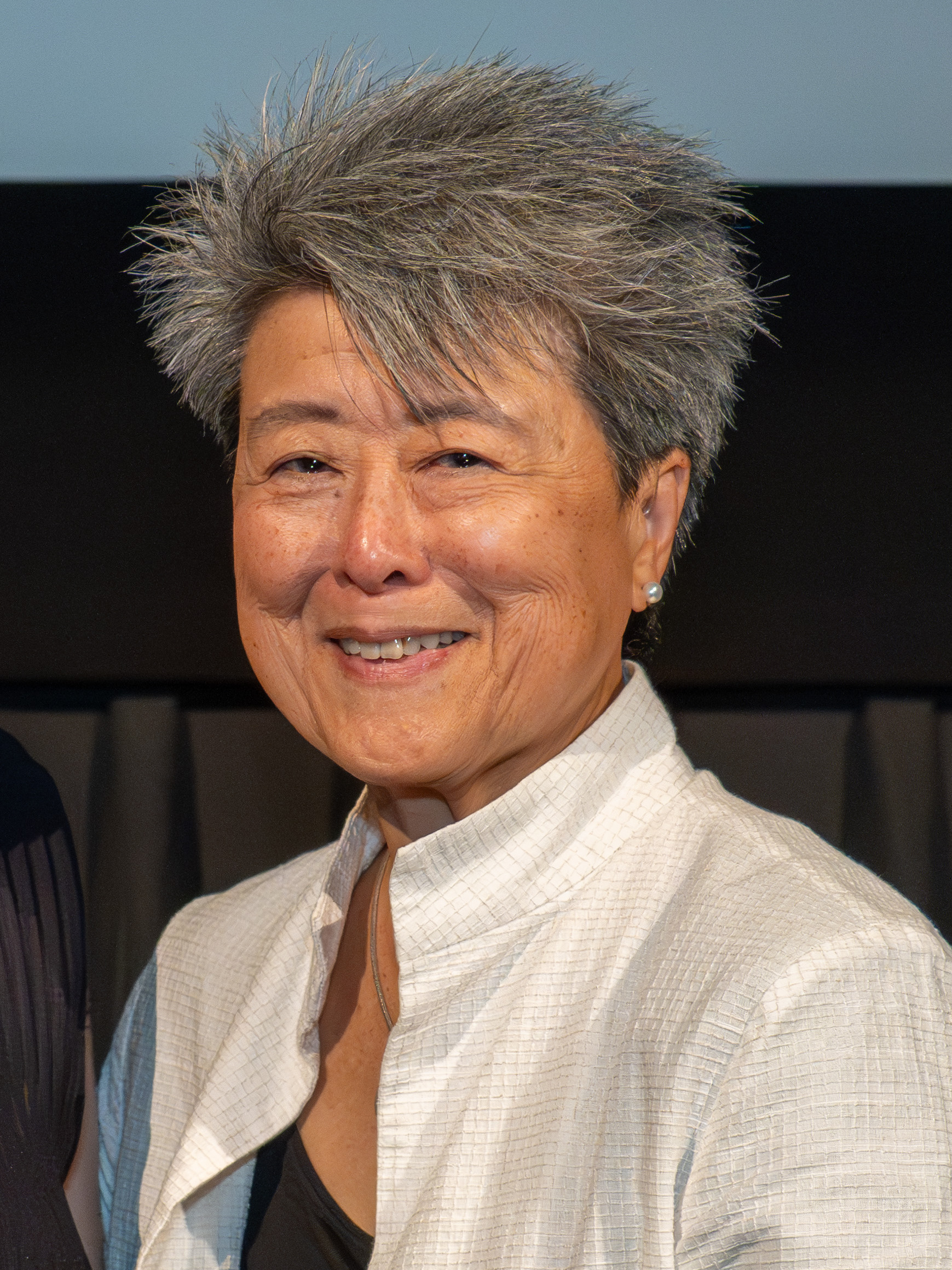
- Zia in 2024
- Born: 1952 (age 73–74); Newark, New Jersey, U.S.
- Education: Princeton University (BA); Tufts University
- Occupations: Journalist, activist
- Spouse: Lia Shigemura
- Website: https://helenzia.com/

Helen Zia
- Traditional Chinese: 謝漢蘭
- Simplified Chinese: 谢汉兰
Transcriptions
Standard Mandarin
- Hanyu Pinyin: Xiè Hànlán
- Wade–Giles: Hsieh4 Han4-lan2
Wu
- Wugniu: ^{6}Zia-Hoe-le

Helen Zia (born 1952) is a Chinese American journalist and activist for Asian American and LGBTQ rights. After Vincent Chin's murder, Zia helped found American Citizens for Justice, which successfully lobbied for a federal trial. She is considered a key figure in the Asian American movement. The political actions of American Citizens for Justice helped coalesce the growing Asian-American activism in the Midwest. After this incident, Zia remained an outspoken advocate and activist for a wide range of causes, from women's rights to gay rights. Furthermore, she testified at the U.S. Commission on Civil Rights on the racial impact of the news media. Zia is also an accomplished author and has published multiple books about Asian American histories and experiences.

== Life and career ==
=== Early childhood and education ===
Zia was born in Newark, New Jersey in 1952 to first generation immigrants from Shanghai. At five years old, she began working in her parents' floral novelty business. She entered Princeton University in the early 1970s as a student in the Princeton School of Public and International Affairs. She was a member of its first graduating class of women. As a student, Zia was among the founders of the Asian American Students Association. She was also a vocal antiwar activist, voicing her opposition to U.S. involvement in the Vietnam War, a firm believer in feminism, and active in movements creating cross racial unity among low income people of color.

Zia entered medical school at Tufts University in 1974, but quit in 1976. She eventually moved to Detroit, Michigan, working as a construction laborer, an autoworker and a community organizer, after which she discovered her life's work as a journalist and writer.

=== Activism ===
Zia's time in Detroit overlapped with the murder of Vincent Chin in 1982. Zia played a crucial role in bringing federal civil rights charges against the perpetrators of Vincent's killing and in igniting an Asian American response to the crime through her journalism and advocacy work. At the time, little existed in terms of a cohesive and organized Asian American movement in Detroit, but Zia's journalism helped to galvanize the Asian American community to demand justice for Vincent Chin. She co-founded the group American Citizens for Justice, a Detroit-based Asian American civil rights group. In 1983, Zia was the president of the American Citizens for Justice.

She has also been outspoken on issues ranging from civil rights and peace to women's rights and countering hate violence and homophobia. In 1997, she testified before the U.S. Commission on Civil Rights on the racial impact of the news media.

She traveled to Beijing in 1995 to the United Nations Fourth World Congress on Women as part of journalists of color delegation.

She has appeared in numerous news programs and films; her work on the 1980s Asian American landmark civil rights case of anti-Asian violence is documented in the Academy Award-nominated film, Who Killed Vincent Chin?, and she was profiled in Bill Moyers' PBS documentary, "Becoming American: The Chinese Experience."

=== Honors and awards ===
Zia was named one of the most influential Asian Americans of the decade by A. Magazine. Zia has received numerous journalism awards for her ground-breaking stories. Her investigation of date rape at the University of Michigan led to campus demonstrations and an overhaul of its policies. Zia received an honorary Doctor of Laws from the Law School of the City University of New York for bringing important matters of law and civil rights into public view.

In August 2020, Zia was one of three recipients of the NAAAP100 Award from the National Association of Asian American Professionals (NAAAP). She received it alongside activist Cecilia Chung, businessman Ryan Patel, and youth advocate Symington W. Smith.

In 2022, Zia was honored by the Museum of the Courageous along with Kym Worthy and Kim Trent to "celebrate historical and contemporary courageous acts that have stood up to hate and shifted our country towards justice."

=== Published work ===
Zia's latest work, Last Boat Out of Shanghai: The Epic Story of the Chinese Who Fled Mao's Revolution, was released in January 2019.

In January 2000, Zia authored Asian American Dreams: The Emergence of an American People, a finalist for the prestigious Kiriyama Pacific Rim Book Prize. Former president of the United States Bill Clinton quoted from Asian American Dreams at two separate speeches in the White House Rose Garden.

In January 2002, she co-authored with Wen Ho Lee My Country Versus Me, which reveals Lee's experiences as a Los Alamos scientist who was falsely accused of being a spy for the People's Republic of China in the "worst case since the Rosenbergs."

She contributed the piece Reclaiming the Past, Redefining the Future: Asian American and Pacific Islander Women to the 2003 anthology Sisterhood Is Forever: The Women's Anthology for a New Millennium, edited by Robin Morgan.

Zia was the executive editor of Ms. Magazine 1989 to 1992 Zia also serves on the board of directors for Women's Media Center. Her articles, essays and reviews have appeared in numerous publications, books and anthologies, including Ms., The New York Times, The Washington Post, The Nation, Essence, The Advocate, and OUT.

=== Personal life ===
In June 2008, Zia married her partner Lia Shigemura in San Francisco, making them one of the first same-sex couples to legally marry in the state of California. She currently resides in Oakland, California and continues to do activism and workshops there.

== External Resources ==
- 2022 Interview with NPR on Vincent Chin's Death
