= A Dream Is What You Wake Up From =

1978 film

- Artwork for the film's digital release
- Directed by: Larry Bullard; Carolyn Johnson
- Produced by: Third World Newsreel
- Cinematography: Larry Bullard
- Edited by: Allan Siegel
- Music by: Charrles Sullivan
- Release date: 1978
- Running time: 50 minutes
- Country: United States
- Language: English

A Dream Is What You Wake Up From is a 1978 American film that combines documentary and narrative techniques to tell the stories of two black families in the United States. The film focuses on the intersection of race, gender, and wealth, comparing and contrasting the lives of a poor Harlem family and a more affluent family in the New Jersey suburbs.

The blending of documentary and narrative filmmaking makes it deliberately "unclear" which scenes involve "professional" versus "non-professional" actors (as they are called in the film's credits). The film merely opens with a title card that reads "Segments of this film are dramatized," and only certain scenes—such as a Reconstruction era dramatization—are obviously fictional. This style is said to be inspired by Cuban director Sara Gómez, whom the film is dedicated to along with Mozambican activist Josina Machel.
