= Who Killed Vincent Chin? =

1987 film

- Directed by: Christine Choy and Renee Tajima-Peña
- Produced by: Christine Choy and Renee Tajima-Peña
- Cinematography: Kyle Kibbe
- Edited by: Holly Fisher
- Production companies: Film News Now Foundation and WTVS
- Distributed by: Filmakers Library
- Release date: 1987
- Running time: 87 minutes
- Country: United States
- Languages: English; Cantonese

Who Killed Vincent Chin? is a 1987 American documentary film produced and directed by Christine Choy and Renee Tajima-Peña that recounts the killing of Vincent Chin. It was nominated for the Academy Award for Best Documentary Feature. It was later broadcast as part of the PBS series POV.

In 2021, the film was selected for preservation in the United States National Film Registry by the Library of Congress as being "culturally, historically, or aesthetically significant".

== Overview ==
On a summer night in Detroit in 1982 (during a time of anti-Asian sentiment due to Japan being blamed for America's decline in the auto industry), two white autoworkers fatally beat Vincent Chin, a 27-year-old Chinese engineer, with a baseball bat. The film tracks the incident from the initial eye-witness accounts through the trial and its repercussions for the families involved, and the American justice system at large. After an outcry from the Asian American community, led by Vincent's mother Lily Chin, the case becomes a civil rights Supreme Court case. The case ends with tried killer Ronald Ebens' being let go with a suspended sentence and a small fine.

== Awards ==
- Alfred I. duPont–Columbia University Award, Silver Baton (1991)
- Hawaii International Film Festival, Best Documentary Award (1988)
- Academy Awards, Best Documentary Feature Nominee (1989)

== See also ==
- Vincent Who?, 2009 documentary about the same case.
