= American Citizens for Justice =

Asian American civil rights group

- Established: 1982 (44 years ago)
- Founders: Helen Zia
- Types: nonprofit organization

American Citizens for Justice is an Asian American civil rights group formed in 1982 in Detroit, Michigan. While the Asian American movement was already developing in the West Coast of the United States, American Citizens for Justice was a significant force for a pan-Asian consciousness as part of the Asian American movement in the Midwest.

== History ==
In 1982, Vincent Chin was gruesomely murdered. His killers encountered Chin in a bar in Highland Park and mistook his Chinese heritage for the Japanese, whom they blamed for a recent downturn in the automobile industry. He was bludgeoned to death with a baseball bat. Despite their conviction and evidence, the killers never saw prison time and were only given light sentences.

Vincent Chin's killers Ronald Ebens and his stepson Michael Nitz were fined $3000 and given 3 years probation, as the judge expressed the defendants' good backgrounds. Detroit's Asian American community were outraged by the judge's lenient sentence, seeing this as official support of anti-Asian violence, and eventually formed the American Citizens for Justice. After the sentencing, the American Citizens for Justice conducted an investigating and found that one of the dancers of the bar overheard Ebens saying "Nip," "Chink," and "because of you mother fuckers, we're out of work." This research enabled new civil rights charges to be pursued against Ebens and Nitz. This went to a federal trial which rendered a 20-year sentence against Ebens, although this was later appealed based on trial errors. A second trial was held, but Ebens was found not guilty violating the civil rights in killing Chin.

While the American Citizens for Justice was predominantly composed of Chinese Americans, they wanted a pan-Asian framework to offer greater solidarity with other Asian groups. Furthermore, they named the group the "American Citizens for Justice" instead of "Asian Americans for Justice" because they saw it as less offensive or intimidating. Furthermore, while Asian Americans in Detroit began to be involved in civil rights, African American groups such as the umbrella Detroit-Area Black Organizations and the Detroit chapter of the NAACP offered solidarity for their events.
