= Renee Tajima-Peña =

American filmmaker (born 1958)

- Born: Chicago, Illinois, U.S.
- Education: Harvard University
- Occupations: Documentary filmmaker, Professor
- Notable work: Who Killed Vincent Chin?; No Más Bebés; My America... or Honk If You Love Buddha

Renee Tajima-Peña is an American filmmaker whose work focuses on immigrant communities, race, gender and social justice. Her directing and producing credits include the documentaries Who Killed Vincent Chin?, No Más Bebés, My America...or Honk if You Love Buddha, Calavera Highway, Skate Manzanar, Labor Women and the 5-part docuseries Asian Americans.

== Biography ==
Tajima-Peña attended John Muir High School in Pasadena, California, and later received her bachelor's degree cum laude from Harvard University's Radcliffe College, where she majored in East Asian Studies and sociology. While at Harvard, she was co-chairperson of the United Front Against Apartheid.

Tajima-Peña has been deeply involved in the Asian American independent film community as an activist, writer, and filmmaker. She was the first paid director at Asian Cine-Vision in New York and a founding member of the Center for Asian American Media (formerly National Asian American Telecommunications Association) and A-Doc the Asian American Documentary Network. She also founded the Asian American International Video Festival. Additionally, she was a film critic for The Village Voice, a cultural commentator for National Public Radio, and the editor of Bridge: Asian American Perspectives.

== Activism ==
Tajima-Peña began filmmaking out of a desire for activism and political expression. Growing up in the 1970s, she was heavily influenced by the Asian American movement, the Civil Rights Movement, and others. Tajima-Peña later turned her interest toward social change filmmaking.

== Teaching career ==
In 2013, Tajima-Peña was appointed Professor of Asian American Studies and the Alumni and Friends of Japanese American Ancestry Endowed Chair at UCLA. She also directs the Center for EthnoCommunications at UCLA, housed in the Asian American Studies Center with a teaching component in the Asian American Studies Department. Prior to UCLA, she was Professor of Film & Digital Media at the University of California, Santa Cruz where she launched the Graduate Program in Social Documentation.

== Awards ==
Tajima-Peña’s film "Who Killed Vincent Chin" (1987), was nominated for an Academy Award for Best Feature Documentary. Her other honors include a Guggenheim Fellowship, a Peabody Award, an Alfred I. duPont-Columbia University Award, the Alpert Award for Film/Video, the James Wong Howe “Jimmie” Award, the Justice in Action Award, and two International Documentary Association Achievement Awards (one shared), the Media Achievement Award from MANAA, the Steve Tatsukawa Memorial Award and the APEX Excellence in the Arts Award. She has twice earned Fellowships in Documentary Film from both the Rockefeller Foundation and the New York Foundation on the Arts.

Her films have screened at the Cannes Film Festival, London Film Festival, Museum of Modern Art, New Directors/New Films Festival, Redcat, San Francisco International Film Festival, Sundance Film Festival, SXSW, Toronto International Film Festival, and the Whitney Museum of American Art Biennial.

Her documentaries have been broadcast around the world, including BBC, CBC Canada, SBS Australia, Fujisankei, Tokyo Broadcasting System, VPRO Netherlands, ZDF Germany, ABC, Home Box Office, Oxygen, Lifetime Television, the Sundance Channel, and PBS. In 2009 she won a Fellow Award from United States Artists.

== Selected filmography ==
- "Asian Americans" PBS docuseries (series producer)
- "No Más Bebés" (director, producer)
- "Whatever It Takes" (executive producer)
- "Calavera Highway" (director, producer, writer)
- "The New Americans: Mexico Story" (PBS)
- "My Journey Home" (executive producer, director)
- "Skate Manzanar" (director, cinematographer)
- "Labor Women" (producer, director, cinematographer)
- "The Last Beat Movie" (director, producer, writer)
- "My America...or Honk if You Love Buddha" (producer, director, writer)
- "The Best Hotel on Skid Row" (producer, director, writer)
- "Jennifer’s in Jail" (Lifetime Television)
- "Declarations: All Men Are Created Equal?" (producer)
- "What Americans Really Think of the Japanese" (Fujisankei)
- "Yellow Tale Blues"
- "Who Killed Vincent Chin?" (director, producer)

== Other work ==
Her recent works include the ground-breaking PBS 5-part docuseries, Asian Americans that traces 170 years of Asian American history through the lens of race, immigration, culture and activism. Her award-winning documentaryNo Mas Bebés uncovers the coercive sterilization of Mexican-origin women at Los Angeles County-USC Medical Center during the 1960s and 70s, and the landmark civil rights lawsuit challenging the practice, Madrigal v. Quilligan. It premiered at the 2015 Los Angeles Film Festival and was broadcast on the PBS documentary series Independent Lens. Tajima-Peña's transmedia curriculum project is Building History 3.0, an interactive exploration of the incarceration of Japanese Americans during World War II using the online video game Minecraft.
