= Killing of Vincent Chin =

1982 homicide in Michigan, U.S.

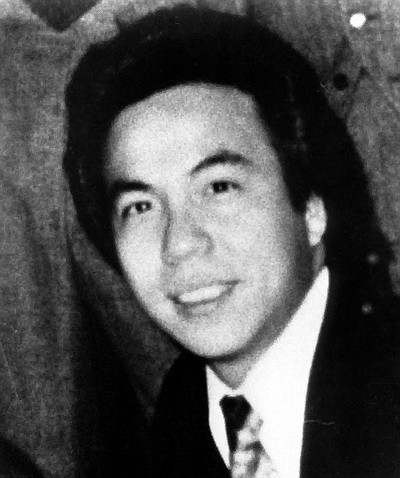
- Vincent Chin
- Location: Highland Park, Michigan, U.S.
- Date: June 19, 1982; 44 years ago
- Attack type: Homicide by bludgeoning, manslaughter, hate crime
- Victim: Vincent Jen Chin
- Perpetrators: Ronald Madis Ebens; Michael Nitz
- Motive: Resentment over unemployment in auto industry, blamed on Japanese imports, Anti-Asian racism
- Charges: State charges: Manslaughter; Second-degree murder (dropped after plea deal); Federal charges: Violation of civil rights (2 counts each)
- Verdict: State charges: Pleaded guilty to manslaughter Federal charges: Ebens guilty of one count of violation of civil rights, but verdict overturned Nitz not guilty of violation of civil rights
- Sentence: State sentences: Both perpetrators sentenced to three years of probation and $3,780 fine Federal sentence: Ebens: 25 years in prison (overturned)
- Litigation: Ebens ordered to pay $1.5 million to Chin's family, Nitz ordered to pay $50,000

Vincent Jen Chin
- Traditional Chinese: 陳果仁
- Simplified Chinese: 陈果仁
Transcriptions
Standard Mandarin
- Hanyu Pinyin: Chén Guǒrén
- Gwoyeu Romatzyh: Chern Guooren
- Wade–Giles: Chʻên^{2} Kuo^{3}-jên^{2}
Yue: Cantonese
- Yale Romanization: Chàhn Gwó-yàhn
- Jyutping: Can4 Gwo2jan4

Vincent Jen Chin (Chinese: 陳果仁; May 18, 1955 – June 23, 1982) was an American draftsman of Chinese descent who was killed in a racially motivated assault by two white men, Chrysler plant supervisor Ronald Ebens and his stepson, laid-off autoworker Michael Nitz. Ebens and Nitz assailed Chin following a brawl that took place at a strip club in Highland Park, Michigan, where Chin had been celebrating his bachelor party with friends in advance of his upcoming wedding. Against the backdrop of high anti-Japanese sentiment in the United States at the time – known as "Japan bashing" – Ebens and Nitz assumed Chin was Japanese, and a witness described them using anti-Asian racial slurs as they attacked him, ultimately beating Chin to death.

Although accounts vary, the men were expelled from the club following a physical altercation. Ebens and Nitz eventually found Chin in front of a nearby McDonald's, where Nitz held Chin down while Ebens repeatedly bashed him with a baseball bat, fracturing Chin's skull. Chin was taken to Henry Ford Hospital in Detroit, where he died of his injuries four days later. In their first trial, Ebens and Nitz accepted a plea bargain to reduce the charges from second-degree murder to manslaughter.

Wayne County Circuit Court Judge Charles Kaufman sentenced Ebens and Nitz to three years' probation and a $3,000 fine, but no jail time. Explaining his rationale, Kaufman said that Ebens and Nitz "weren't the kind of men you send to jail ... You don't make the punishment fit the crime; you make the punishment fit the criminal." Described by the president of the Detroit Chinese Welfare Council as a "$3,000 license to kill", the lenient sentence led to an uproar from Asian Americans and spurred the community into activism. The advocacy group American Citizens for Justice (ACJ) was formed to protest the sentencing. The case has since been viewed as a critical turning point for Asian American civil rights engagement and a rallying cry for stronger federal hate crime legislation.

== Background ==
Vincent Jen Chin was born on May 18, 1955, in Guangdong province, Mainland China. He was the only child of Bing Hing "David" Chin (a.k.a. C.W. Hing) and Lily Chin (née Yee). David earned the right to bring a Chinese bride into the United States through his service in World War II. After Lily suffered a miscarriage in 1949 and was unable to have children, the couple adopted Vincent from a Chinese orphanage in 1961.

Throughout most of the 1960s, Chin grew up in Highland Park. In 1971, after the elderly Hing was mugged, the family moved to Oak Park, Michigan. Vincent Chin graduated from Oak Park High School in 1973, going on to study at Control Data Institute and Lawrence Tech. At the time of his death, Chin was employed as an industrial draftsman at Efficient Engineering, an automotive supplier, and as a waiter at the Golden Star restaurant in Ferndale, Michigan on weekends. He was engaged, and was set to marry Vikki Wong on June 28, 1982.

During an economic recession in the early 1980s, the decline of the auto industry provoked resentment toward imported Japanese cars in Detroit, which was the center of the automotive industry in the United States. "Japan bashing" became popular with politicians, such as U.S. representative from Michigan John Dingell, who blamed "little yellow men" for domestic automakers' misfortune. Nationwide, Anti-Asian racism often accompanied campaigns urging consumers to "Buy American".

== Killing ==
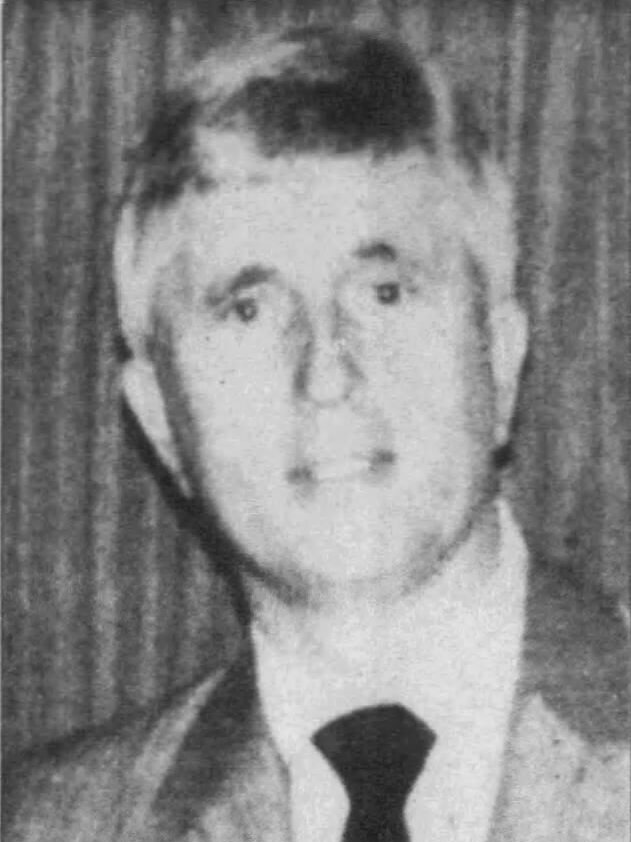
Ronald Ebens

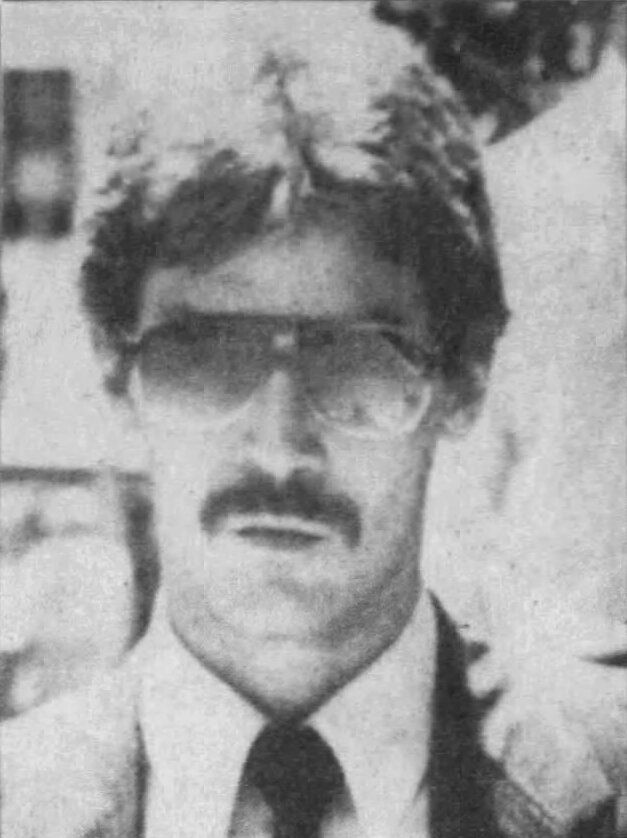
Michael Nitz

On June 19, 1982, Chin was having a bachelor party at the Fancy Pants Club in Highland Park to celebrate his upcoming wedding with three of his friends: Jimmy Choi, Gary Koivu, and Robert Siroskey. Seated across the stage from them were two white men, Chrysler plant supervisor Ronald Ebens and his stepson, laid-off autoworker Michael Nitz. According to an interview by American documentary filmmaker Michael Moore for the Detroit Free Press, after Chin gave a white stripper a generous gratuity, Ebens shouted, "Hey, you little motherfuckers!", and told an African-American dancer, "Don't pay any attention to those little fuckers, they wouldn't know a good dancer if they'd seen one." Racine Colwell, a dancer at the bar, later testified that Ebens said, "It's because of you little motherfuckers that we're out of work." This statement later provided the evidence for civil rights litigation against Ebens. He later claimed that the argument was not about Chin's race but the Black dancer's gratuity. Another witness said that he heard the anti-Chinese racial slur "Chink" being used towards Chin, while another man said Ebens told him, "I'll give you $20 if you help us catch the Chinaman."

Ebens claimed that Chin walked over to him and Nitz and threw a punch at his jaw. The fight escalated as Nitz shoved Chin in defense of his stepfather, and Chin countered. One of the dancers reported that Ebens and Chin picked up chairs and started swinging them at each other. Nitz suffered a cut on his head from a chair that Ebens had intended to use to strike Chin. Chin and his friends left the room, while a bouncer led Ebens and Nitz to the restroom to clean up the wound. According to Ebens and Nitz, one of Chin's friends, Robert Siroskey, came back inside to use the restroom and apologized to the group, stating that Chin had a few drinks due to his bachelor's party. Ebens and Nitz had also been drinking that night, although not at the club, which did not serve alcohol.

When Ebens and Nitz left the club, they encountered Chin and his friends who were waiting outside for Siroskey. Chin called Ebens a "chicken shit", at which point Nitz retrieved a baseball bat from his car and Chin and his friends ran down the street. Ebens and Nitz searched the neighborhood for 20 to 30 minutes and even paid another man 20 dollars to help them look for Chin before finding him at a nearby McDonald's restaurant. Chin attempted to escape, but was held by Nitz while Ebens repeatedly bludgeoned Chin with a baseball bat, fracturing his skull. Ebens was arrested and taken into custody at the scene of the crime by two off-duty police officers who had witnessed the beating. One of the officers said that Ebens wielded the bat like he was swinging "for a home run". Michael Gardenhire, one of the police officers, called for an ambulance. Chin was rushed to Henry Ford Hospital and was comatose on arrival. He never regained consciousness and died four days later on June 23, 1982; Chin was only 27 years old.

== Legal proceedings ==
=== State criminal charges ===
Ebens and Nitz were charged with second-degree murder, but accepted a plea bargain to reduce the charges to manslaughter. They were sentenced by Wayne County Circuit Judge Charles Kaufman to three years' probation and were each ordered to pay a $3,000 fine plus $780 in court costs, but received no jail time.

Kaufman explained his light sentences based on Ebens' and Nitz's lack of previous criminal records, their stability in the community, and his opinion that the two would not go on to harm anyone else. Kaufman said in justifying his decision that Ebens and Nitz "weren't the kind of men you send to jail" and "[y]ou don't make the punishment fit the crime; you make the punishment fit the criminal". Kaufman argued that the assault was "the continuation of a fight that Mr. Chin apparently started", and that had the incident been a case of self-defense, Ebens and Nitz "would not be guilty of anything." Kaufman had been a Japanese-held prisoner of war during World War II, but denied that any anti-Asian sentiment had influenced his ruling.

The Detroit Free Press argued in an editorial that "the overall handling of the Chin case seems disturbingly casual", remarking on the limited evidence presented at sentencing, the reduced charges due to plea bargaining, the lack of a prosecutor at the hearing to argue for a harsher sentence, and Kaufman's disregarding of the pre-sentence report's recommendation of imprisonment. The editorial concluded that the "result was a process that made Vincent Chin's life seem cheap and the criminal justice system either callous or perverse".

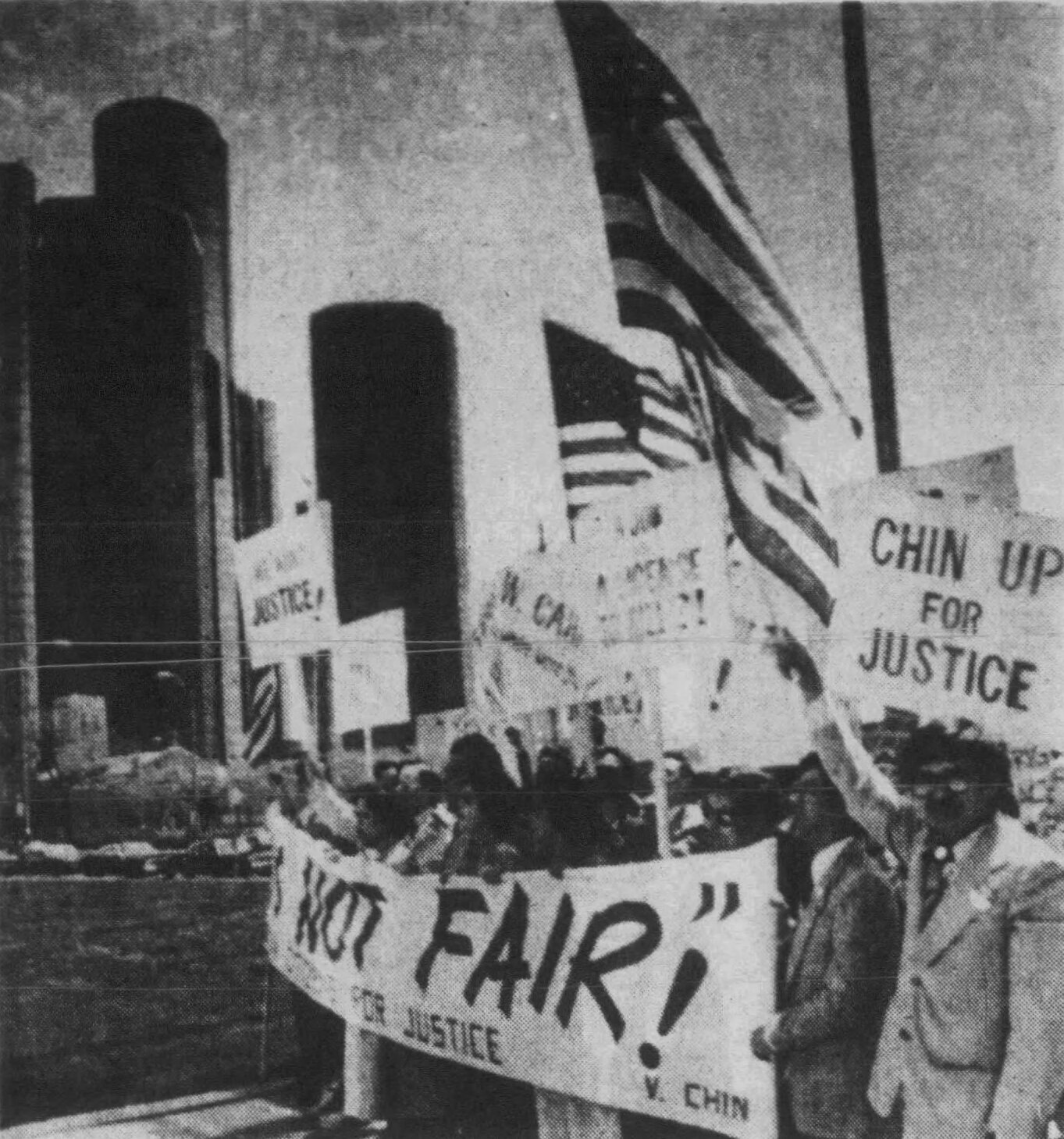
People marching by Detroit's Renaissance Center in protest of the sentence of Chin's killers being too light, May 9, 1983

The lenient sentencing of Ebens and Nitz enraged the Asian-American communities in the Detroit area and across the United States, who saw it as a sign of public indifference toward racism directed at Asian-Americans. The president of the Detroit Chinese Welfare Council said the verdict amounted to a "$3,000 license to kill" Chinese Americans. Others across the country were spurred into activism; the advocacy group American Citizens for Justice (ACJ) was formed to protest the sentencing and began working toward a judicial appeal. The ACJ quickly gained the support of diverse ethnic and religious groups, advocacy organizations, and politicians such as the Detroit City Council president and Congressman John Conyers.

=== Federal civil rights charges ===
Government officials, politicians, and several prominent legal organizations dismissed the theory that civil rights law should be applied to the death of Chin. The Detroit chapters of the American Civil Liberties Union and the National Lawyers Guild did not consider Chin's killing a violation of his civil rights. At first, the ACJ was the only group that supported applying existing civil rights laws to Asian Americans. Eventually, the national body of the National Lawyers Guild endorsed its efforts.

Journalist Helen Zia and lawyer Liza Chan led the fight for federal charges, which resulted in the two killers being accused of two counts of violating Chin's civil rights under title 18 of the United States Code.

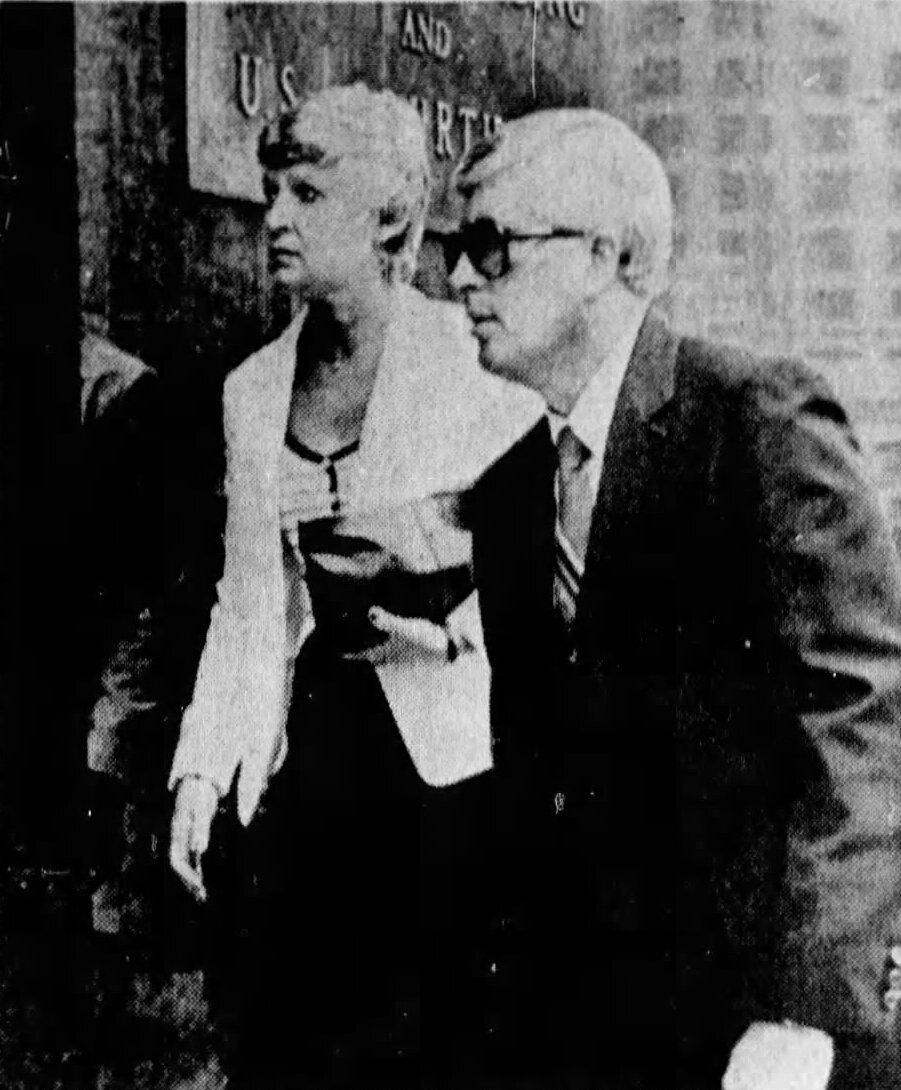
Ebens entering the United States District Court for the Eastern District of Michigan, June 28, 1984

The 1984 federal civil rights case against the men found Ebens guilty of the second count and sentenced him to 25 years in prison while Nitz was acquitted of both counts. Ebens' conviction was overturned in 1986—a federal appeals court found that an attorney for the ACJ had improperly coached witnesses. Chin's friend Jimmy Choi had at first supported Ebens' version of no racial animosity or epithets and that Chin threw a chair that injured Nitz, but he changed his statement after meeting the ACJ attorney.

After the verdict, the ACJ once again mobilized to press the Department of Justice for a retrial, which took place in Cincinnati. U.S. District Judge Anna Diggs Taylor explained that Ebens could not be given a "fair and impartial trial" in Metro Detroit due to the "saturation of publicity" surrounding the case. This trial, before a mostly white and male jury, resulted in Ebens being acquitted on all charges.

=== Civil suits ===
A civil suit for the unlawful death of Chin was settled out-of-court in March 1987. Michael Nitz was ordered to pay $50,000 while Ronald Ebens was ordered to pay $1.5 million, at $200/month for the first two years and 25% of his income or $200/month thereafter, whichever was greater. This represented the projected loss of income from Chin's draftsman position, as well as Lily Chin's loss of Vincent's services as a laborer and driver. Ebens left the state and stopped making payments in 1989.

In November 1989, Ebens reappeared in court for a creditor's hearing, where he detailed his finances and reportedly pledged to make good on his debt to the Chin estate. However, in 1997, the Chin estate was forced to renew the civil suit due to non-payment, as it was allowed to do every 10 years. In November 2015, Ebens sought to have the resulting lien against his house vacated, citing it was placed against him "with malice...to annoy and harass". In January 2016, the judge ruled there was not sufficient legal standing to remove the lien as a result of improper filing of the motion. As of 2015, with interest accrued, fees, and inflation, the amount due is now estimated to be "over $8 million".

== Aftermath and legacy ==
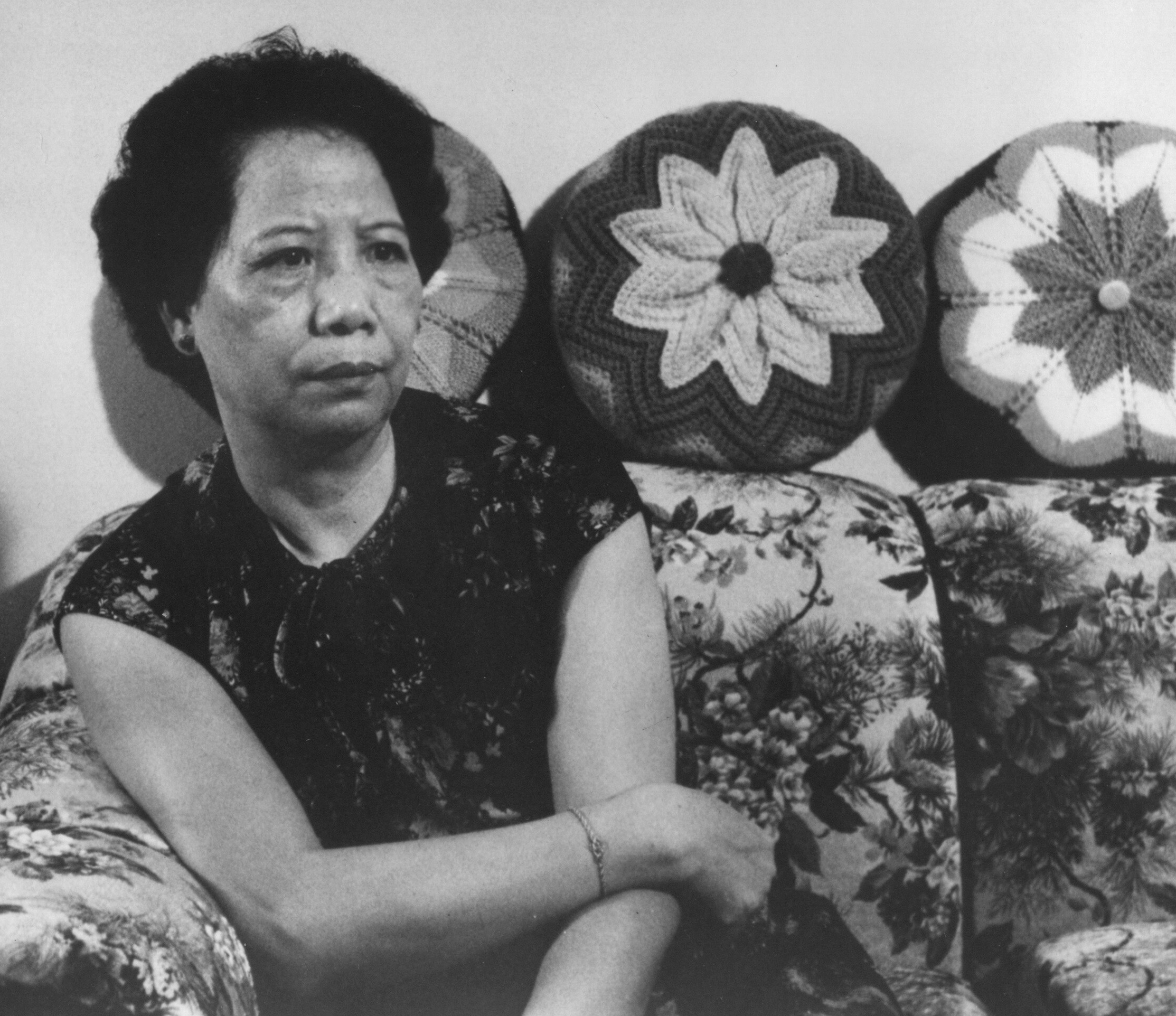
Chin's mother, Lily

Chin was interred at Forest Lawn Cemetery in Detroit.

In September 1987, Chin's mother, Lily, moved back to her hometown of Guangzhou, China, reportedly to avoid being reminded of her son's death. Lily returned to the United States for medical treatment in late 2001 and died of cancer on June 9, 2002; she was 81 years old. Prior to her death, Lily established a scholarship in Vincent's memory, to be administered by the ACJ. In 2010, the city of Ferndale, Michigan, erected a milestone marker at the intersection of Woodward Avenue and 9 Mile Road in memorial of the killing of Chin.

Chin's case has been cited by some Asian Americans in support of the idea that they are considered "perpetual foreigners" in contrast to "real" Americans who are considered full citizens. Lily Chin stated: "My son is beaten like an animal and, and the killer is not in jail. If this happened in China, [Ebens and Nitz] would be put in [an] electric chair. This is freedom and democracy? Why isn't everybody equal?", and, "What kind of law is this? What kind of justice? This happened because my son is Chinese. If two Chinese killed a white person, they must go to jail, maybe for their whole lives [...] Something is wrong with this country."

The attack was considered a hate crime by many, but it predated the passage of hate crime laws in the United States. Sociologist Meghan A. Burke writes that Chin's killing prompted the creation of activist coalitions and a shared sense of pan-Asian identity for the first time in U.S. history. The case has since been viewed as a turning point for Asian American civil rights engagement and a rallying cry for stronger federal hate crime legislation.

In June 2024, the FBI released part of its case file on Vincent Chin's death.

== Documentaries ==
- Who Killed Vincent Chin? (1988), documentary by Renee Tajima and Christine Choy. Nominated for a 1989 Academy Award for Best Documentary.
- Vincent Who? (2009), documentary written and produced by Curtis Chin and directed by Tony Lam.

Paula Yoo wrote the young adult narrative nonfiction book From a Whisper to a Rallying Cry: The Killing of Vincent Chin and the Trial that Galvanized the Asian American Movement (2022), which recounts the events and the impact Chin's killing has had on Asian Americans.

== See also ==
- Anti-Chinese sentiment in the United States
- Anti-Japanese sentiment in the United States
- Detroit: Race Riots, Racial Conflicts, and Efforts to Bridge the Racial Divide
- Hate crime laws in the United States
- Racism in the United States
- Stop Asian Hate
- 2021 Atlanta spa shootings
- List of homicides in Michigan
