= Charles Kaufman (judge) =

American judge

Charles Kaufman (February 13, 1920 – June 30, 2004) was an American judge for the Third Circuit Court of Michigan, with jurisdiction over south-east Michigan and its largest city, Detroit. He is mostly remembered for sentencing Ronald Ebens and Michael Nitz to probation for the 1982 killing of Vincent Chin in Detroit.

== Biography ==
Born on February 13, 1920, Kaufman served as a navigator for the Army Air Force during World War II. He became a POW (prisoner of war) in a Japanese prison camp when his plane was shot down after 27 missions.

After the war, Kaufman graduated from Wayne State University Law School in 1948, and joined his father's firm before winning the election for Common Pleas Court Judge in 1959, and Wayne County Third Circuit Court of Michigan in 1964 where he served for 30 years. He also was a candidate for the First District of the Michigan Court of Appeals in 1968 and 1982, and a Michigan State Supreme Court candidate in 1976. He received the Eleanor Roosevelt Humanitarian Award from the Anti-Defamation League and was the chairman of the civil rights fundraising organization Fund for Equal Justice.

=== Abortion Rights ===
Judge Kaufman ruled it was unconstitutional to ban abortions before the U.S. Supreme Court ruling in Roe v. Wade.

=== Vincent Chin ruling ===
Kaufman is the judge who sentenced former Chrysler plant superintendent Ronald Ebens and his stepson Michael Nitz on March 16, 1983, to three years' probation and $3,780 in fines and court costs after they were convicted of manslaughter for the killing of Vincent Chin. Asian-American advocacy groups were outraged.

Ebens and Nitz went to hunt down Chin after an altercation that had happened at a strip club. Ebens paid a friend $20 to help them find Chin, finding him 30 minutes later at a nearby McDonald’s. Nitz held Chin down while Ebens viciously bludgeoned Chin with a baseball bat until his head cracked open.

The act was a hate crime, as multiple witnesses claimed to hear Ebens say, "It's because of you little motherfuckers that we're out of work," referring to the Japanese auto industry, particularly Chrysler's increased sales of captively-imported Mitsubishi models rebadged and sold under the Dodge and now-defunct Plymouth brands, and Nitz's layoff from Chrysler in 1979, despite the fact that Chin was of Chinese descent, not Japanese.

Citing the judge's POW record in a Japanese prison camp as one of several reasons to invalidate the sentence in favor of a more stringent punishment, advocacy groups unsuccessfully tried to vacate the original sentence. There were no minimum sentencing guidelines at the time for a manslaughter plea. Kaufman also cited the defendants' clean prior criminal records as he responded, "These weren't the kind of men you send to jail... You don't make the punishment fit the crime; you make the punishment fit the criminal." Mandatory minimum sentencing guidelines were later promulgated by the Michigan Supreme Court.

Kaufman's sentence was upheld as valid and final, due to the Fifth Amendment protection against double jeopardy, and the advocacy groups shifted their efforts toward a Federal prosecution for the violation of Vincent Chin's civil rights. This would also prove ultimately unsuccessful after an appeal and retrial of Ebens' original 1984 federal conviction resulted in acquittal.

Kaufman later retired from the Third Circuit Court, and died on June 30, 2004.

== Personal life ==
Kaufman was a member of Temple Israel (West Bloomfield, Michigan).
