= Ronald Ebens =

American murderer (born 1939)

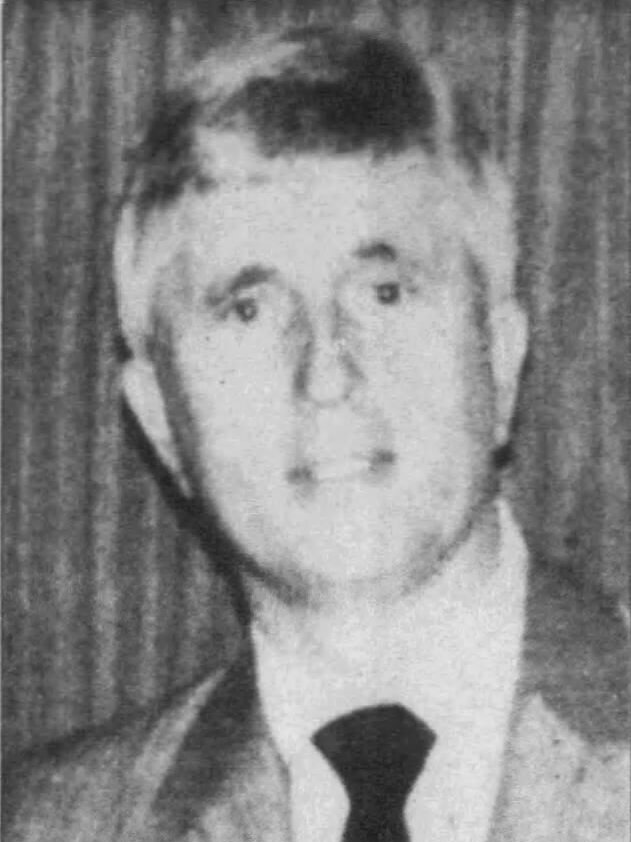
- Ebens c. 1984
- Born: Ronald Madis Ebens; October 30, 1939 (age 86); Dixon, Illinois
- Status: Released
- Occupations: Chrysler plant supervisor, bar owner
- Motive: Resentment over unemployment in auto industry, blamed on Japanese imports, anti-Asian racism
- Convictions: Manslaughter; Violation of civil rights; overturned and not guilty verdict on retrial
- Penalty: Three years probation and $3,780 fine; 25 years in prison (overturned)

Details
- Victims: Vincent Chin (陳果仁) (killed)
- Date: June 19, 1982
- State: Michigan

Ronald Madis Ebens (born October 30, 1939) is an American convicted killer. Ebens, with his stepson Michael Nitz as an accomplice, killed Vincent Chin, a Chinese American draftsman, on June 19, 1982, in a racially motivated assault. This led to a federal indictment for violating Chin's civil rights, but only after public outrage at the probationary sentence and small fine imposed by Michigan Third Circuit Court Judge Charles Kaufman. Ebens was found guilty on one count of violating Chin's civil rights and was sentenced to 25 years in prison, but the conviction was overturned on appeal.

== Early life ==
Ronald Ebens was born on October 30, 1939, in Dixon, Illinois and raised in Oregon, Illinois. He served 2½ years in Army Air Defense School. On August 25, 1965, Ebens started work at Chrysler Corporation's plant in Belvidere, Illinois, and was promoted to salaried trim foreman on November 8. He married Juanita Ebens in 1971, his second marriage, after a brief marriage at the age of 18.

Ebens' work with Chrysler brought him to Detroit, Michigan, where he owned a bar, Ron's Place, located on Van Dyke Avenue during the 1970s. In 1982, Ebens was a superintendent at the Warren Truck Assembly Plant.

== Vincent Chin ==
The fight which would lead to the killing of Vincent Chin started at The Fancy Pants Club, when Chin took umbrage at a remark that Ebens made to a stripper who had just finished dancing at Chin's table (Chin was having a bachelor party, as he was to be married nine days later). According to an interview by Michael Moore for the Detroit Free Press, Ebens told the stripper, "Don't pay any attention to those little fuckers, they wouldn't know a good dancer if they'd seen one."

Ebens claimed that Chin walked over to Ebens and Michael Nitz and threw a punch at Ebens' jaw without provocation. Witnesses at the ensuing trial testified that Ebens also got up and said, "It's because of you little motherfuckers that we're out of work," referring to the Japanese auto industry, particularly Chrysler's increased sales of captively imported Mitsubishi models rebadged and sold under the Dodge and now-defunct Plymouth brands and Nitz's layoff from Chrysler in 1979, despite the fact that Chin was of Chinese descent, not Japanese. It is disputed whether Ebens uttered other racial slurs.

The fight escalated as Nitz shoved Chin in defense of his stepfather, and Chin countered. At the end of the scuffle, both Ebens and Nitz were sprawled on the floor, with Nitz suffering a cut on his head from a thrown chair. Chin and his friends left the room, while a bouncer led Ebens and Nitz to the restroom to clean up the wound. While they were there, Robert Siroskey, one of Chin's friends, came back inside to use the restroom. He is said to have apologized for the group, stating that Chin had a few drinks because of his bachelor's party. However, Siroskey did not actually admit to saying that, for it was Ebens and Nitz who claimed that Siroskey had apologized to both of them on behalf on Vincent. Ebens and Nitz had also been drinking that night, although not at the club, which did not serve alcohol. Jimmy Choi also reentered the club to look for Siroskey. When Ebens and Nitz left the club, Chin and his friends were still waiting outside for Siroskey. Chin challenged Ebens and Nitz to continue the fight in the parking lot, at which point Nitz retrieved a baseball bat from his car and chased Chin and his friends out of the parking lot. Ebens and Nitz searched the neighborhood for 20 to 30 minutes and even paid another man $20 to help them look for Chin, before finding him at a McDonald's restaurant. Chin tried to escape but was held by Nitz while Ebens repeatedly bludgeoned Chin with a baseball bat until Chin's head cracked open. A policeman who witnessed the violent beating said Ebens was swinging the bat like he was swinging "for a home run." Chin was rushed to Henry Ford Hospital and was comatose on arrival; he never regained consciousness and died four days later on June 23, 1982. He was only 27 years old. Ebens was arrested for the initial assault. After Chin's death, Ebens and Nitz were charged with second-degree murder.

== Consequences ==
On July 1, 1982, the Detroit Free Press published a front-page article about Chin's killing. The United Auto Workers told Chrysler of a plan to strike if Ebens remained employed with Chrysler. As management, Ebens was not a member of the union, and the company placed him on vacation, asking him to leave Warren Truck Assembly later that same day. On July 16, Ebens was placed on unpaid status pending resolution of the case.

On March 16, 1983, after a plea bargain was reached the previous month to reduce the charge to third-degree manslaughter (which had no minimum sentence and could be resolved with probation), Judge Charles Kaufman sentenced Ebens and Nitz to three years' probation, a $3,000 fine, and $780 in court costs, explaining that his decision was based on Chin having initiated the physical altercation, on neither defendant having prior convictions, on Chin afterward having survived four days on life support and this fact lending reasonable doubt to the case of intent to murder, and on there being no Wayne County prosecutor present to argue for a more severe punishment. Kaufman later wrote, "These weren't the kind of men you send to jail ... You don't make the punishment fit the crime; you make the punishment fit the criminal."

On March 28, 1983, Chrysler formally discharged Ebens from his position at Chrysler, citing that his plea entered a felony conviction on his criminal record. Meanwhile, protests from the Asian-American community and Detroit media led to a federal investigation, a November 1983 indictment by a grand jury for the violation of Chin's and Choi's civil rights, and a June 1984 trial in which Nitz was acquitted of all charges, and Ebens was acquitted of one charge, and found guilty of the other. He was sentenced to 25 years in prison.

Ebens' lawyers appealed, and the 6th Circuit Court of Appeals found the trial judge to have erred in not allowing the defense to present key pieces of evidence, chiefly an audiotape of Liza Cheuk May Chan of the American Citizens for Justice interviewing Chin's friends together, creating the grounds for an argument that the prosecution tampered with the witness testimony by getting them to "agree on what happened". A retrial was ordered, and Ebens was acquitted of the final charge, with a Cincinnati jury finding no racial motivation in the killing of Vincent Chin.

A civil suit for the unlawful death of Vincent Chin was settled out of court on March 23, 1987. Nitz was ordered to pay $50,000 in $30 weekly installments over the following 10 years. Ebens was ordered to pay $1.5 million, at $200/month for the first two years and 25% income or $200/month thereafter, whichever was greater. This represented the projected loss of income from Chin's engineering position, as well as Lily Chin's loss of Vincent's services as a laborer and driver. However, the estate of Vincent Chin would not be allowed to garnish social security, disability, or Ebens' pension from Chrysler, nor could the estate place a lien on Ebens' house.

In April 1988, Ebens sued Chrysler for $10,000 and reinstatement on the grounds of wrongful termination. Chrysler claimed that such action at that date exceeded the statute of limitations. This suit was still pending when Ebens was forced to return to court to explain his reasons for failing to keep up with the payments in the Chin settlement. On September 6, 1990, a decision of no cause of action against the plaintiff, Ebens, and in favor for the defendant, Chrysler, at which point Chrysler attempted to sue for the $10,921.84 ($9,919 labor and $1,002.84 expenses) in legal fees it spent on the case.

At the November 1989 hearing, the Chin estate, represented by attorney James Brescoll, questioned how Ebens could obtain loans for a Dodge van and Plymouth Sundance requiring payments of $682/month, yet could not meet his $200/month minimum obligation. Ebens explained about the motorcycle accident in Wisconsin that killed his youngest stepson, Matt Nitz (Juanita Ebens lost her job after quitting work to care for her son), and of Ebens' general inability to find work due to his infamy from the Chin case. Ebens testified that he had stopped looking for work, other than the occasional odd job, and was awaiting the outcome of the litigation against Chrysler.

On August 28, 1997, the Chin estate renewed the civil suit, as it was allowed to do every 10 years. The complaint listed Ebens as having only paid $3,000 on the judgment, and adjusted the damages with $3,205,604.37 in accrued interest, $15 for the judgment, $90 in clerk fees, and $65 for service fees and mileage for a new total of $4,683,653.89. The proof of service listed an address in Henderson, Nevada.

Michael Nitz reportedly did make payments pursuant to the original settlement, in spite of filing for Chapter 13 bankruptcy in 1986. Ebens' homeowners' policy paid about $20,000. Ebens has been attributed with conflicting statements as to whether he ever intends to fulfill his debt, but in a 1987 newspaper interview, Ebens told future filmmaker Michael Moore that he would not give his detractors satisfaction by committing suicide.

=== Contrition ===
In June 2012, just before the 30th anniversary of the killing and in the wake of a prominent retrospective opinion piece in The New York Times, Ebens stated on a phone interview from his home in Nevada with writer Emil Guillermo, saying that killing Chin was "the only wrong thing I ever done [sic] in my life," though partially blamed Chin for the killing and denied that the killing was motivated by racism.
